= List of places of worship in Dhaka =

There are various places of worship in Dhaka, the capital of Bangladesh. Dhaka is also called City of Mosques (মসজিদের শহর).

== Mosques ==
- Baitul Mukarram
- Kakrail Mosque
- Lalbagh Fort Mosque
- Khan Mohammad Mridha Mosque
- Star Mosque
- Kartalab Khan Mosque
- Baitur Rauf
- Sat Gambuj Mosque
- Shaista Khan Mosque
- Qassabtuly Mosque
- Musa Khan Mosque
- Shahbaz Khan Mosque
- Chawkbazar Shahi Mosque
- Nakhaklpara Sapra Mosque
- Allakuri Mosque
- Azimpur Mosque
- Katabon Mosque
- Binat Bibi Mosque
- Gulshan Society Mosque
- Sobhanbag Mosque and Madrasa Complex
- Zebun Nessa Mosque

== Churches ==
- Saint Mary Cathedral, Ramna
- Holy Rosary Church Cathedral, Tejgaon
- St Thomas Cathedral, Old Dhaka
- Armenian Church, Old Dhaka

== Hindu temples ==
- Dhakeshwari Temple
- Joy Kali Temple
- Ramna Kali Mandir
- Raksha Kali Mandir
- Shiddeswari Kali Temple
- Ganesh Temple
- Tapoban Temple

== Buddhist temples ==
- Kamalapur Dharmarajika Bauddha Vihara
- Buddhist Monastery, Merul Badda
- Shakyamuni Buddhist Temple
- Bangladesh Buddho Mohabihar

== Gurudwaras ==
- Gurdwara Nanak Shahi
- Gurudwara Sangat Tola

== See also ==
- List of districts and suburbs of Dhaka
