= List of mosques in Bangladesh =

This is a list of mosques and eidgahs in Bangladesh.

== Mosques ==
=== Barisal Division ===
Name	Image	Location	Year (CE)	Tradition	Notes
Majidbaria Shahi Mosque		Majidbaria, Mirzaganj, Patuakhali	1465	Sunni	Built by Khan-i-Azam Uzayr Khan during reign of Ruknuddin Barbak Shah
Bibi Chini Masjid		Bibi Chini, Betagi, Barguna	17th century	Sunni	Built by Shah Neyamat Ullah
Momin Mosque		Akonbari, Burirchar, Mathbaria, Pirojpur	1913	Sunni	

==== Barisal District ====
Name	Image	Location	Year (CE)	Tradition	Notes
Paka Masjid		Sardar Bari, North Asli Santoshpur, Lata Union, Qazirhat, Mehendiganj Upazila	14th century	Sunni	Established by Aferuddin Hawlader
Qasba Mosque		Qasba, Gournadi Upazila	1500s (early)	Sunni	Established by Faujdar Sabi Khan
Masum Khan Masjid		Kamalapur, Gournadi Upazila	16th century	Sunni	Also known as Kamalapur Masjid, named after Masum Khan
Nasrat Gazi Masjid		Sialguni, Bakerganj Upazila	16th century	Sunni	Built by Nasrat Ghazi during the reign of Nasiruddin Nasrat Shah
Miah Bari Mosque		Miah Bari, Karapur, Barisal Sadar	1807	Sunni	Established by former zamindar Hayat Mahmud
Ulania Zamindar Bari Mosque		Ulania, Mehendiganj Upazila	1861	Sunni	Established by Ulania Zamindar family
Guthia Masjid		Wazirpur Upazila	2003	Sunni	Officially "Baitul Aman Jame Masjid Complex"
Al-Karim Jame Mosque		Charmonai, Barisal Sadar Upazila	1924	Sunni	Founded by Maulvi Ahsanullah

==== Bhola District ====
Name	Image	Location	Year (CE)	Tradition	Notes
Purana Masjid		Majhi Bari, South Dighaldi	16th century	Sunni	Rediscovered in 2024
Fatema Khanom Jame Mosque		Banglabazar, South Digholdi Union, Bhola Sadar Upazila	2012	Sunni	
Nizam-Hasina Foundation Mosque		Ukilpara, Bhola	2016	Sunni	Established by Nizamuddin Ahmad and his family
Charfassion Khasmahal Central Jame Mosque		Char Fassion			

==== Jhalokati District ====
Name	Image	Location	Year (CE)	Tradition	Notes
Galua Paka Mosque		Durgapur, Rajapur Upazila	1716	Sunni	Established by Mahmud Jan/Khan Akand
Khanbari Jame Mosque		Khan Bari, Rajapur Upazila		Sunni	
Prachin Jame Mosque		Rajapur Upazila		Sunni	

=== Chittagong Division ===
Name	Image	Location	Year (CE)	Tradition	Notes
Ajgobi Mosque		Cox's Bazar, Cox's Bazar District	17th century	Sunni	
CoxMC Central Mosque		Cox's Bazar Medical College, Cox's Bazar	2008	Sunni	

==== Brahmanbaria District ====
Name	Image	Location	Year (CE)	Tradition	Notes
Arifail Masjid		Arifail, Sarail	1662	Sunni	Also known as Arail Masjid, adjacent to Shah Arif's mazar (mausoleum)
Bhadughar Shahi Mosque		Bhadughar, Brahmanbaria	1663	Sunni	Established by Noor Elahi ibn Majlis Shahbaz, zamindar of Sarail
Ulchapara Mosque		Ulchapara, Brahmanbaria	1727	Sunni	
Jamia Islamia Yunusia		Brahmanbaria	1914	Sunni	Established by Abu Taher Muhammad Yunus
Eidgah Mosque		Shahbazpur, Sarail		Sunni	
Ansar Mukhtar Mosque				Sunni	
Bayt at-Taqwa Jame Mosque		Darikandi, Nabinagar		Sunni	

==== Chandpur District ====
Name	Image	Location	Year (CE)	Tradition	Notes
Alamgiri Mosque		Walipur, Haziganj Upazila	1692	Sunni	Also known as Walipur Shahi Masjid
Bakhtiyar Khan Mosque		Kachua	1706 (1117 AH)	Sunni	Named after the local Faujdar Bakhtiyar ibn Ilyas Khan
Gobindapur Patwari Bari Jame Mosque		Gobindapur, Rahimanagar, Kachua	1840s	Sunni	Established by Muhammad Chhita Ghazi Patwari
Taltoli Masjid		Taltoli, Kachua	1891	Sunni	Formerly Munshibari Masjid named after the Munshibari family of Comilla.
Great Mosque of Hajiganj		Hajiganj Bazar, Hajiganj	1931	Sunni	Oldest mosque in Chandpur, established by Haji Ahmad Ali Patwari
Shahabuddin College Jame Mosque		Shahabuddin School and College, Lakshmipur, Chandpur Sadar		Sunni	
Chhoto Holudiya Mosque		Sarkar Bari, Chhoto Holudiya, Farazikandi Union, North Matlab		Sunni	
Rupsa Zamindar Bari Mosque		Rupsa Zamindar Bari, Faridganj		Sunni	Established by the zamindars of Rupsa

==== Chittagong District ====
Name	Image	Location	Year (CE)	Tradition	Notes
Faqir Mosque		Hathazari	15th century	Sunni	Established during the reign of Shamsuddin Yusuf Shah (1474–1481)
Hammadiyar Mosque		Masjidiya, Kumira Union, Sitakunda	1530s	Sunni	Second oldest mosque in Chittagong District, established by local ruler Hamid Khan originally as Hamidiya Mosque
Chuti Khan Mosque		Jorarganj, Mirsharai Upazila	16th century	Sunni	Established by Chuti khan, the son of Paragal khan, a Bengali general who was the governor of chittagong under Sultan Alauddin Hossain Shah, and he also took part in Bengali conquest of Arakan.
Saheb Bibi Mosque		Lelangara, Binajuri Union, Raozan Upazila	1612	Sunni	Established by Saheb Bibi, wife of Zamindar Amir Muhammad Chowdhury
Anderkilla Shahi Jame Mosque		Andarkilla Road, Chittagong	1669	Sunni	First Mughal building in Chittagong
Qadam Mubarak Mosque		Andarkilla Road, Chittagong	1669	Sunni	First Mughal building in Chittagong
Manu Mia Mosque		Sholkata, Barkhain Union, Anwara Upazila	1676	Sunni	Established by Zamindar Zabardast Khan Manu Mia
Wali Khan Masjid		Chawkbazar, Chittagong	1716	Sunni	
Sheikh Bahar Ullah Jame Masjid		Sholokbahar, Chittagong	1737 (Mughal era)	Sunni	
Abdul Bari Chowdhury Mosque		Barumchara, Anwara Upazila	1756	Sunni	Established by Zamindar Chowdhury Abdul Bari
Washil Chowdhury Para Mosque		Chowdhury Para, Chittagong	1795	Sunni	Built by Asghar Ali Chowdhury
Asgar Ali Chowdhury Jame Mosque		Chowdhury Para Road, Halishahar Thana, Chittagong	1795	Sunni	
Sreepur Bura Mosque		Sreepur-Kharandwip, Boalkhali	1886	Sunni	Established by Wasin Choudhury
Kapasgola Jamtola Shahi Jame Mosque		Chawkbazar, Chittagong	1890	Sunni	
Bakshi Hamid Mosque		Ilsha, Baharchhara, Banshkhali	Mughal era	Sunni	
Masjid-e-Siraj ud-Daulah		Chandanpura, Chittagong	Mughal era	Sunni	It is also known as Chandanpura Masjid. Named after Nawab Siraj ud-Daulah
Sharif Mosque		Nalapara, East Madarbari, Chittagong	1908	Sunni	
Chunti Mosque		Chunti, Lohagara	1977	Sunni	Known popularly as Chunti Boro Miyaji & Chhoto Miyaji Masjid
Masjid E Baitullah Chunti		Chunti, Lohagara	1982	Sunni	Known popularly as Masjid E Baitullah Chunati
Faqira Jame Mosque		South Bhatiari, Sitakunda	2000	Sunni	Located near Faujdarhat Station
Chandgaon Mosque		Chandgaon Thana, Chittagong	2007	Sunni	Shortlisted for Aga Khan Award for Architecture in 2010
Shaikh Ismail Jame Masjid		Dumuria Anwara Upazila	2009	Sunni	Established by Needy Foundation
CVASU Farm Mosque		CVASU Farm campus, Hathazari Upazila	2020	Sunni	
Masjid-e-Dewania		315 Dhaka Trunk Rd, Chittagong	2020	Sunni	
Masjid Eisa		South Sarenga, Anwara Upazila	2020	Sunni	Established by Needy Foundation
Masjid-e-Ebrahim		North Paruapara, Anwara Upazila	2021	Sunni	Established by Needy Foundation
Masjid Osman Bin Kamsi		South Sarenga, Anwara Upazila	2022	Sunni	Established by Needy Foundation
Masjid Mohammed		Khuruskul Anwara Upazila	2023	Sunni	Established by Needy Foundation
Masjid Hajah Ratipah Binte Haji Abdul Majid		Khaskhama Anwara Upazila	2023	Sunni	Established by Needy Foundation
Masjid Haji Abdul Wahab Bin Haji Abu		Juidandi Anwara Upazila	2023	Sunni	Established by Needy Foundation
Mirerkhil Jame Mosque		Mirerkhil, Bhujpur Union, Fatikchhari Upazila		Sunni	On the banks of Mirer Pukur
Balusha Moulvi's Mosque		West Syed Nagar, Boalkhali		Sunni	Also known as Soddar/Sardar Para Mosque
Jami'ah Al-Falah Masjid		Chittagong		Sunni	Also known as Bayt Al-Falah
Mullah Miskin Mosque		Chawkbazar Thana, Chittagong		Sunni	
IIUC Central Mosque		International Islamic University, Chittagong		Sunni	
CVASU Mosque		Chittagong Veterinary and Animal Sciences University, Khulshi		Sunni	
FCC Jame Mosque		Faujdarhat Cadet College, Faujdarhat, Chittagong		Sunni	
WAPDA Colony Jame Mosque		WAPDA Colony, Chittagong		Sunni	
Gazetted Officers Colony Jame Mosque		Gazetted Officers Colony, Chittagong		Sunni	
Chandgaon Residential Area Jame Mosque		Chandgoan residential area, Chandgaon Thana, Chittagong		Sunni	
Chairman Para Jame Mosque		Chairman Para, Madarsha Union, Satkania Upazila		Sunni	
Postal Colony Jame Mosque		Postal Colony, Agrabad, Chittagong		Sunni	
Baytus Salat Jame Mosque		Project Colony, Agrabad, Chittagong		Sunni	
Shahchand Auliya Jame Mosque		Patiya Upazila		Sufi	
Al-Awwal Mosque		Chittagong		Sunni	
Badr Auliya Mosque		Chittagong		Sufi	

==== Comilla District ====
Name	Image	Location	Year (CE)	Tradition	Notes
Noor Manikchar Mosque		Nurmanikchar, Debidwar	16th century	Sunni	Built by Syed Noor Ahmad Qadiri
Shah Shuja Mosque		Comilla	1658	Sunni	Built by Shah Shuja after the victorious Conquest of Tripura
Boro Sharifpur Mosque		Boro Sharifpur, Laksham	1706	Sunni	Established by Muhammad Hayat Abdul Karim near Nateshwar Dighi
Chitodda Mosque		Chitodda, Barura	1774	Sunni	Built by Muhammad Jamal
Arjuntola Mosque		Arjun Tola, Barura Upazila	1788	Sunni	
Nawab Faizunnesa Mosque		Laksam Upazila	Late 19th century	Sunni	Built by Nawab Faizunnesa, the first South Asian female Nawab
Mehar Nazar Mamud Haji Bari Jame Masjid		Haji Bari, Mehar, Chandina Upazila	1925	Sunni	Established by Alhaj Nazar Mahmud
Baitul Aman Jame Mosjid		Baskar Ali Haji Bari, Shidlai, Brahmanpara	2009	Sunni	Established by Ali Ashraf
Alhaj Zamir Khan Jame Masjid		North Khushbas, Barura Upazila		Sunni	
Baitul Jannat		Laksam Road, Kandirpar, Comilla		Sunni	
Victoria Government College Central Mosque		Honors Section, Comilla Victoria Government College		Sunni	
Surikara Jame Masjid		Gunabati Union, Chauddagram		Sunni	

==== Feni District ====
Name	Image	Location	Year (CE)	Tradition	Notes
Muhammad Ali Chowdhury Mosque		Sharshadi, Feni Sadar Upazila	1690s	Sunni	Established by zamindar Muhammad Ali Chowdhury
Chand Ghazi Bhuiyan Mosque		Chandghazi, Chhagalnaiya Upazila	1701 (1112 AH)	Sunni	Also known as Chand Khan Masjid
Sharshadi Shahi Mosque		Sharshadi, Feni Sadar Upazila	Sultanate era	Sunni	
Karim-Box Chowdhury Jame Masjid		Dagunbhuiya, Feni	Early 1800s	Sunni	It was first built in the early 1800s and later rebuilt in 2018

==== Lakshmipur District ====
Name	Image	Location	Year (CE)	Tradition	Notes
Jinn Masjid		Raipur Upazila	18th century	Sunni	Also known as Masjid-e-Jami Abdullah, named after its founder Moulvi Abdullah Saheb
Tita Khan Mosque		Lakshmipur	18th century	Sunni	Built in Azim Shah's garden
Lillah Jame Mosque		Mathir Hat Road, Moju Chowdhury Hat, Charramani Mohan Union, Lakshmipur Sadar Upazila	1960	Sunni	Oldest mosque in Moju Chowdhury Hat
Saifia Darbar Sharif		Moju Chowdhury Hat, Charramani Mohan Union, Lakshmipur Sadar Upazila	1987	Sufi	
Rasel RB Mosque		Raipur Upazila	before 2025	Sunni	
Baitur Rashid Mosque		Moju Chowdhury Hat, Charramani Mohan Union, Lakshmipur Sadar Upazila		Sunni	
Dayra Sharif		Shyampur, Karpara Union, Ramganj Upazila		Sufi	Former residence of Ghulam Sarwar Hussaini
Masjid-i-Nur		Lakshmipur		Sunni	
Motka Mosque		Majupur, Lakshmipur		Sunni	

==== Noakhali District ====
Name	Image	Location	Year (CE)	Tradition	Notes
Bajra Shahi Masjid		Bazra, Sonaimuri	1741	Sunni	
Ramadan Miah Mosque		Bataiya Union, Kabirhat	18th century	Sunni	
Nalua Miah Bari Jame Masjid		Nalua, Domuria Union, Senbagh	1839	Sunni	Established by Shamsuddin Mianji in 1839, rebuilt & relocated by his heiress Noor A Alam Chowdhury on 18 September 2020
Noakhali District Mosque		Bazra, Maijdee	1841	Sunni	Built by Imam Uddin Sawdagar, also known as the Grand Mosque of Maijdee

=== Dhaka Division ===
Name	Image	Location	Year (CE)	Tradition	Notes
Machain Shahi Mosque		Machain, Balla Union, Harirampur Upazila, Manikganj District	16th century	Sunni	Also known as Rustam Shah's mosque
Shafia Sharif		Rajoir Upazila, Madaripur District	1430s	Sufi	Adjacent to the Darbar-e-Awliya shrines
Parulia Shahi Mosque		Narshinghapur, Gazaria, Palash, Narsingdi District	1714	Sunni	Built by Bibi Zaynab bint Nasir Shah
BSMRSTU Central Mosque		Bangabandhu Sheikh Mujibur Rahman Science and Technology University, Gopalganj District	Before 2025	Sunni	
Belabo Central Mosque		Belabo Upazila, Narsingdi District		Sunni	
Sureswar Darbar Sharif		Sureswar, Naria Upazila, Shariatpur District		Sufi	

==== Dhaka District ====
Name	Image	Location	Year (CE)	Tradition	Notes
Binat Bibi Masjid		Narinda, Dhaka	1454	Sunni	
Naswal Masjid		Naswal Road, Dhaka	1459	Sunni	Obsolete
Beraid Bhuiyanpara Mosque		Bhuiyanpara, Beraid, Badda Thana	1505	Sunni	
New Bandura Shahi Mosque		Bandura, Nawabganj Upazila	1615	Sunni	Also known as Shahi Vanga Masjid, founded by Islam Khan Chishti
Islam Khan Masjid		Sayyid Awlad Husayn Lane, Old Dhaka	1632	Sunni	
Churihatta Shahi Masjid		26-27 Sheikh Haydar Bakhsh Lane, Old Dhaka	1649	Sunni	Established by Muhammad Beg during the governorship of Shah Shuja
Shaista Khan Masjid		Mitford, Old Dhaka	1664	Sunni	
Chhota Katra Mosque		Chhota Katra, Dhaka	1660s	Sunni	
Chawkbazar Shahi Masjid		Chawkbazar, Lalbagh, Dhaka	1676	Sunni	
Lalbagh Fort Masjid		Lalbagh, Dhaka	1678	Sunni	Also known as "Lalbagh Kella'r Tin Gombuzwala Shahi Masjid" and previously "Killa-e-Aurangabad-er Tin Gombuzwala Shahi Masjid". It is part of the Lalbagh Fort.
Shahbaz Khan Masjid		Shahbag, Dhaka	1679	Sunni	Also known as Hazrat Haji Khwaja Shahbaz Khan Mosque
Allakuri Masjid		Mohammadpur, Dhaka	1680	Sunni	Earliest known square single-domed Mughal-style mosque in Bengal.
Ambar Shah Masjid		Kawran Bazar, Dhaka	1680	Sunni	Established by Khwaja Ambar Shah
Sat Gambuj Masjid		Mohammadpur, Dhaka	Late 17th century	Sunni	Means "7 dome Masjid"
Kartalab Khan Masjid		Begum Bazar, Old Dhaka	1701	Sunni	Also known as "Begum Bazar Masjid"
Khan Mohammad Mridha Mosque		Lalbagh, Dhaka	1705	Sunni	
Azimpur Masjid		Dhaka	1746	Sunni	Last existing example of a structure with a single dome & a flanking half-domed vault on both sides.
Musa Khan Masjid		University of Dhaka, Dhaka	18th century	Sunni	
Star Mosque		Armanitola, Dhaka	Late 18th Century	Sunni	Locally known as Tara Masjid
Masjid-e-Mufti-e-Azam		60 Tanuganj Lane, Sutrapur Thana, Old Dhaka	1812	Sunni	Also known as Kulutola Mosque
Qassabtuly Masjid		PK Ghosh Road, Koshaituli, Old Dhaka	1919	Sunni	Officially Qassabtuly Jam E Masjid
Kakrail Mosque		Ramna Thana, Dhaka	1952	Sunni	The centre of the country's Tablighi Jamaat
Nakhalpara Sapra Mosque		Nakhalpara, Tejgaon, Dhaka	1961	Sunni	
Baitul Mukarram		Dhaka	1960s	Sunni	National mosque. It is the 10th largest mosque in the world, accommodating more than 40,000 people
Gulshan Central Mosque		Gulshan Thana, Dhaka	1976	Sunni	Gulshan Azad Masjid
Sobhanbag Mosque and Madrasa Complex		Mirpur Road, Dhanmondi Residential Area, Dhanmondi Thana, Dhaka	1991	Sunni	Two-stories and has a library and a clinic.
Baitur Rauf		Fayedabad, Dhaka	2012	Sunni	Designed by Marina Tabassum for her grandmother, Sufia Khatun
Masjid al-Kuwait al-Kabir		PWD Mirpur Division, Darus Salam Road, Paikpara, Mirpur Model Thana, Dhaka	2016	Sunni	Also known as Paikpara Government Staff Quarter Jame Mosque
Gulshan Society Mosque		Gulshan Thana, Dhaka	2017	Sunni	Gulshan Society Jame Masjid
Faqihul Millat Mufti Abdur Rahman Jame Masjid		Bashundhara Residential Area, Dhaka	2020	Deobandi	Named after Abdur Rahman (scholar)
Zebun Nessa Mosque		Ashulia, Dhaka	2023	Sunni	
Dhaka Railway Station Central Jame Mosque		Dhaka railway station, Dhaka		Sunni	
Baitul Aman Jame Mosque		New Market, Dhaka		Sunni	
Katabon Masjid		Shahbag, Dhaka		Sunni	Officially named the "Bangladesh Masjid Mission Complex Central Mosque".
Army Central Mosque		Dhaka		Sunni	Central mosque for the Bangladesh Armed Forces
Chandrima Uddan Mosque		Chandrima Uddan, Sher-e-Bangla Nagar, Dhaka		Sunni	Adjacent to the Mausoleum of Ziaur Rahman Memorial Hall
University of Dhaka Central Mosque		University of Dhaka, Dhaka		Sunni	
Jahangirnagar University Central Mosque		Jahangirnagar University, Savar Upazila		Sunni	
National Martyrs' Memorial Jame Mosque		National Martyrs' Memorial, Savar Upazila		Sunni	
Doleshwar Hanafia Jame Mosque		Doleshwar, Keraniganj Upazila		Sunni	Winner of the UNESCO Asia-Pacific Awards 2021 Cycle for Cultural Heritage Conservation
Social Islami Bank Mosque		Social Islami Bank Limited, Motijheel Thana, Dhaka		Sunni	
Sunnati Jame Mosque		Muhammadia Jamia Shareef Madrasa, 5 Outer Circular Rd, Dhaka		Sunni	

==== Faridpur District ====
Name	Image	Location	Year (CE)	Tradition	Notes
Pathrail Masjid		Bhanga Upazila	15th century	Sunni	
Satoir Mosque		Satair, Boalmari Upazila	16th century	Sunni	
Muslim Mission Jame Mosque		Muslim Mission College, Kumarpur, Faridpur	Before 2025	Sunni	

==== Gazipur District ====
Name	Image	Location	Year (CE)	Tradition	Notes
Sultanpur-Dargapara Shahi Jame Masjid		Sultanpur-Dargahpara, Toke, Kapasia Upazila	17th century	Sunni	
Barjapur-Panchua Riyad Jame Masjid		B/77 Welftion Office Road, Barishaba, Kapasia Upazila	2000	Sunni	Established by Abdullah bin Musa al-Ismail and headquarters of Welftion Human Welfare Association
Haji Abdus Sattar Mosque		Vangnahati, Sreepur Upazila	2016	Sunni	

==== Kishoreganj District ====
Name	Image	Location	Year (CE)	Tradition	Notes
Saheb Bari Mosque		Saheb Bari, Jawar, Tarail Upazila	1534	Sunni	Built by Khan-i-Muazzam Nur ibn Rahat Khan
Pagla Mosque and Islamic Complex		Harua, Kishoreganj Sadar	16th century	Sunni	Either built by Dewan Dhil Qadr Khan Pagla or the Haybatnagar zamindars
Isa Khan's Mosque		Jangalbari Fort, Karimganj Upazila	16th century	Sunni	Established by Isa Khan
Qutub Mosque		Austagram Upazila	16th century	Sunni	
Sadi Mosque		Egarosindur, Pakundia Upazila	1651	Sunni	Established by Shaykh Sadi ibn Shiru
Aurangzeb Mosque		Shalongka, Kastal Union, Pakundia Upazila	1669	Sunni	Built by Shaykh Muhammad Hanif al-Muhaddith
Shah Mahmud Mosque		Egarosindur, Pakundia Upazila	1680	Sunni	Established by merchant Shaykh Mahmud
Gurai Mosque		Gurai, Nikli Upazila	1680	Sunni	
Dewan Bari Mosque		Dewan Bari, Bajitpur Upazila	1693	Sunni	Established by Dewan Ghaus Khan
Shahidi Mosque		Kishoreganj Sadar		Sunni	
Pakundia Model Mosque and Islamic Cultural Centre		Pakundia		Sunni	

==== Munshiganj District ====
Name	Image	Location	Year (CE)	Tradition	Notes
Baba Adam's Mosque		Qadi Qasbah, Rampal Union, Munshiganj Sadar Upazila	1483	Sunni	
Sardar Bari Mosque		Sardar Bari, Balakir Char		Sunni	
Baitul Ma'mur		North Furshail, Malkhanagar Union, Sirajdikhan Upazila		Sunni	

==== Narayanganj District ====
Name	Image	Location	Year (CE)	Tradition	Notes
Muazzampur Shahi Mosque		Mohzumpur (formerly Muazzampur), Sonargaon Upazila	1430s	Sunni	Established by Firuz Khan and Ali Musa under Sultan Shamsuddin Ahmad Shah
Bandar Shahi Mosque		Khandakartola, Bandar Upazila	1482	Sunni	Established by Haji Baba Saleh
Yusufganj Masjid		Yusufganj, Mograpara Union, Sonargaon Upazila	15th century	Sunni	
Haji Baba Saleh Mosque		Salehnagar, Bandar Upazila	1505	Sufi	Established by Haji Baba Saleh
Goaldi Masjid		Goaldi, Sonargaon Upazila	1705	Sunni	
Abdul Hamid Masjid		Goaldi, Sonargaon Upazila	1705	Sunni	
Killarpul Shahi Jami' Masjid		Killarpul, Narayanganj	1875	Sunni	Previously known as Bibi Maryam Masjid
Ashrafiya Jami' Masjid		Amlapara, Narayanganj	1890s	Sunni	Along with one minar, oldest mosque in Narayanganj city

==== Tangail District ====
Name	Image	Location	Year (CE)	Tradition	Notes
Tebaria Mosque		Tebaria, Salimabad Union, Tangail Sadar	1600s	Sunni	Built by Malik Khan Mridha
Rajbari Mosque		Salimabad Union, Kalihati	1600s	Sunni	
Atia Masjid		Delduar Upazila	1609	Sunni	
Dhanbari Mosque		Dhanbari Upazila	18th century	Sunni	Also known as Nawab Syed Ali Mosque
Dhalapara Mosque		Dhalapara Union, Ghatail	1917	Sunni	Built by Zamindar Samir Uddin Chowdhury
201 Dome Mosque		South Pathalia, Nagda Simla, Gopalpur Upazila	2013	Sunni	It is most amount dome mosque in the world, many latest Islamic features available this mosque, local people call 201 gombuj masjid
Boali Kalia Para Mosque		Kaliapara, Boalia, Jadabpur, Sakhipur Upazila		Sunni	
Pakulla Mosque		Pakulla, Delduar Upazila		Sufi	
Qadim Hamzani Mosque		Qadim Hamzani, Durgapur Union, Kalihati Upazila		Sunni	
Tuker Par Mosque		Tuker Par, Habla Union, Basail Upazila		Sunni	

=== Khulna Division ===
Name	Image	Location	Year (CE)	Tradition	Notes
Gholdari Shahi Masjid		Gholdari, Ailhash Union, Alamdanga Upazila, Chuadanga District		Sunni	Established by Hazrat Khairul Bashar Omaj
Ten Dome Mosque		Paygram-Qasbah, Phultala, Khulna District	15th century	Sunni	Established during the office of Khan Jahan Ali
Gholdari Shahi Masjid		Thakurpur, Chuadanga Sadar Upazila	1698	Sunni	Established by Hazrat Afu Shah
BNS Titumir Mosque		BNS Titumir, Khalishpur, Khulna	Before 2025	Sunni	Named after Titumir
Masjid Kur		Koyra, Khulna District		Sunni	
Bhater Bhita Masjid		Tila, Maghi, Magura Sadar Upazila	Ancient	Sunni	

==== Bagerhat District ====
Name	Image	Location	Year (CE)	Tradition	Notes
Sixty Dome Mosque		Mosque City of Bagerhat, Bagerhat	Early 15th century	Sunni	It is one of the three UNESCO World Heritage Sites of Bangladesh
Ronbijoypur Mosque		Mosque City of Bagerhat, Bagerhat	1459	Sunni	Built by Ali's disciple Dariya Khan
Bibi Begni Mosque		Mosque City of Bagerhat, Bagerhat	15th century	Sunni	Supposedly named after Khan Jahan Ali's wife
Chunakhola Mosque		Chunakhola, Mosque City of Bagerhat, Bagerhat	15th century	Sunni	
Khan Jahan Ali Mazar Mosque		Mosque City of Bagerhat, Bagerhat	15th century	Sunni	One domed mosque next to Ali's mausoleum
Nine Dome Mosque		Mosque City of Bagerhat, Bagerhat	15th century	Sunni	
Zinda Pir Mosque		Mosque City of Bagerhat, Bagerhat	15th century	Sunni	Named after Syed Shah Ahmad Zinda Pir
Singar Mosque		Mosque City of Bagerhat, Bagerhat	15th century	Sunni	
Reza Khoda Mosque		Mosque City of Bagerhat, Bagerhat	15th century	Sunni	Also called the Six Dome Mosque.

==== Jessore District ====
Name	Image	Location	Year (CE)	Tradition	Notes
Subhararha Mosque		Abhaynagar Upazila	15th century	Sunni	Also known as Khan Jahan Ali Jame Mosque
Qayem Kona Mosque		Jhikargacha Upazila	17th century	Sunni	Also known as Zamindar Mosque
Sheikhpur Jame Masjid		Sheikhpur, Keshabpur Upazila	Mughal era	Sunni	
Sheikhpura Shahi Masjid		Sheikhpura, Sagordari, Keshabpur Upazila	Mughal era	Sunni	

==== Jhenaidah District ====
Name	Image	Location	Year (CE)	Tradition	Notes
Galakata Mosque		Barobazar-Hakimpur Road, Kaliganj Upazila, Jhenaidah	15th century	Sunni	
Pathagar Mosque		Mithapukur Mauza, Barobazar, Kaliganj Upazila, Jhenaidah	Sultanate era	Sunni	
Noongola Mosque		Mithapukur Mauza, Barobazar, Kaliganj Upazila, Jhenaidah	Sultanate era	Sunni	
Satgachia Mosque		Barobazar, Kaliganj Upazila, Jhenaidah	Sultanate era	Sunni	
Pirpukur Mosque		Barobazar, Kaliganj Upazila, Jhenaidah	Sultanate era	Sunni	
Singdaha Awliya Mosque		Singdaha, Kaliganj Upazila, Jhenaidah	Sultanate era	Sunni	Also called Khana-e-Khoda Masjid
Gorar Mosque		Barobazar-Hakimpur Road, Kaliganj Upazila, Jhenaidah	16th century	Sunni	Named after Gora Pir
Jorbangla Mosque		Barobazar-Hakimpur Road, Kaliganj Upazila, Jhenaidah	16th century	Sunni	
Manohar Dighi Mosque		Barobazar-Hakimpur Road, Kaliganj Upazila, Jhenaidah	16th century	Sunni	
Shukur Mallik Mosque		Barobazar-Hakimpur Road, Kaliganj Upazila, Jhenaidah	16th century	Sunni	

==== Kushtia District ====
Name	Image	Location	Year (CE)	Tradition	Notes
Harinarayanpur Shahi Mosque		Harinarayanpur Union, Kushtia Sadar	1639	Sunni	Founded by Shah Shuja
Swastipur Shahi Mosque		Swastipur, Alampur Union, Kushtia Sadar	1660	Sunni	
Tebaria Three-Dome Jame Mosque		Tebaria, Kumarkhali Upazila	1880	Sunni	Established by Haji Alimuddin
Baniakandi Shahi Mosque		Khandaker Bari, Baniakandi, Kumarkhali Upazila	1880	Sunni	Established by the Khandakers of Baniakandi
Kushtia Central Jame Masjid		Nawab Sirajuddaula Road, Thanapara, Kushtia	1890	Sunni	Founded by Zamindar Ataul Haqq of Sheikhpara
Islamic University Central Mosque		Islamic University, Shantidanga, Harinarayanpur Union, Kushtia Sadar	1994	Sunni	Third largest mosque in Bangladesh by area.
Jhaudia Shahi Mosque		Jhaudia, Kushtia Sadar		Sunni	

==== Satkhira District ====
Name	Image	Location	Year (CE)	Tradition	Notes
Prabajpur Shahi Mosque		Probajpur, Kaliganj Upazila	1693	Sunni	Founded by Nawab Nurullah Khan
Kalia Purbopara Jame Mosque		Kalia Purbopara, Satkhira	2006	Sunni	
Tetulia Jami Masjid		Tetulia, Tala Upazila		Sunni	Also known as Khan Bahadur Salamatullah Masjid
Labsha Zamindar Bari Mosque		Labsa, Satkhira Sadar Upazila		Sunni	

=== Mymensingh Division ===
Name	Image	Location	Year (CE)	Tradition	Notes
Harulia Mosque		Harulia, Kendua, Netrokona District	1200s	Sunni	
Ghaghra Khan Bari Mosque		Khan Bari, Ghaghra Lashkar, Jhenaigati, Sherpur District	1608	Sunni	
Bhuiyan Bari Jame Masjid		Haripur-Deuli, Muktagacha Upazila, Mymensingh District	1728	Sunni	
Great Mosque of Mymensingh		Chawk Bazar, Mymensingh		Sunni	
Ashara-e-Mubashsharah Mosque		Gafargaon Upazila, Mymensingh District		Sunni	
Gafargaon Upazila Model Mosque		Gafargaon Upazila, Mymensingh District		Sunni	
Khanbari jame mosque	Khanbari jame mosque	Fulbaria Upazila, Mymensingh District		Sunni	
Maisaheba Jame Masjid		Sherpur Sadar		Sunni	Named after Mai Saheba
Shah Sultan Jame Mosque		Madanpur, Netrokona Sadar		Sunni	

=== Rajshahi Division ===
Name	Image	Location	Year (CE)	Tradition	Notes
Hinda Qasbah Shahi Masjid		Khetlal, Joypurhat	1365	Sunni	
Shahzadpur Dargah Mosque		Shahzadpur Upazila, Sirajganj District	15th century	Sufi	Near the mausoleum of Makhdum Shah Dawlah
Navagram Shahi Mosque		Naogaon, Tarash Upazila, Sirajganj District	1526	Sunni	Established by Azial Mian Jangdar, son of Mir-e-Bahr Munawwar Anar
Kherua Masjid		Sherpur, Bogra	1582	Sunni	Established by Faujdar Mirza Murad Khan ibn Jawhar Ali Qaqshal
Bhellabari Jame Mosque		Bhellabaria, Durduria, Lalpur, Natore	Late Mughal era	Sufi	Near the Dargah of Shah Baghu Dewan
Al-Aman Bahela Khatun Mosque		Belkuchi Upazila, Sirajganj District	2021	Sunni	Established by Muhammad Ali Sarkar of Mukundagati
Akkelpur Station Jame Mosque		Akkelpur, Joypurhat		Sunni	
Tola Mosque		Tola, Sherpur, Bogra		Sunni	
Mosque of Chandaikona		Chandaikona, Raiganj Upazila, Sirajganj District		Sunni	

==== Naogaon District ====
Name	Image	Location	Year (CE)	Tradition	Notes
Mahisantosh Mosque		Dhamoirhat Upazila	1463	Sufi	
Kusumba Shahi Masjid		Kusumba, Manda Upazila	1558	Sunni	Also known as Kala Rotno (Black Pearl)
Islamgathi Mosque		Islamganthi, Bisha, Atrai Upazila	1600s	Sunni	Also known as Islamgati Bazar Mosque

==== Nawabganj District ====
Name	Image	Location	Year (CE)	Tradition	Notes
Khania Dighi Masjid		Shahabazpur Union, Shibganj Upazila	1480	Sunni	Also known as Chamchika/Chamachika Mosque or Rajbibi Mosque
Chhoto Shona Masjid		Shahabazpur Union, Shibganj Upazila	1493	Sunni	The 15 domes were once gilded in gold, giving the name of Small Golden Mosque
Darasbari Masjid		Shahabazpur Union, Shibganj Upazila	15th century	Sunni	
Dhaniachak Mosque		Shahabazpur Union, Shibganj Upazila	15th century	Sunni	
Shah Syed Niyamatullah Masjid		Mughal Tahakhana, Shahbajpur Union, Shibganj	1619	Sunni	Part of the Tahakhana complex

==== Pabna District ====
Name	Image	Location	Year (CE)	Tradition	Notes
Chatmohar Shahi Masjid		Chatmohar Upazila	1581	Sunni	
Bharara Shahi Masjid		Bharara, Pabna Sadar Upazila	1759	Sunni	Established by Asalat Khan
PZS Mosque		Pabna Zilla School, Pabna	1853	Sunni	
Kachari Para Jame Masjid		Kachari Para, Pabna	1889	Sunni	Established by Harun Chaprashir and Sourav Pramanik with assistance of Zamindar Azim Choudhury
South Raghabpur Mosque		South Raghabpur, Pabna		Sunni	
Nagdemra Madina Jame Mosque		Nagdemra, Santhia		Sunni	

==== Rajshahi District ====
Name	Image	Location	Year (CE)	Tradition	Notes
Qismat Maria Masjid		Maria, Durgapur Upazila	1500	Sunni	
Bagha Mosque		Bagha Upazila	1523	Sunni	It is known for its ornamental terracotta decorations.
RC Central Mosque		Rajshahi College, Rajshahi		Sunni	
RU Central Mosque		University of Rajshahi, Motihar Thana, Rajshahi		Sunni	
Saheb Bazar Grand Mosque		Saheb Bazar, Rajshahi		Sunni	
Hatim Khan Mosque		Rajshahi		Sunni	

=== Rangpur Division ===
Name	Image	Location	Year (CE)	Tradition	Notes
Mirzapur Shahi Mosque		Mirzapur, Atwari, Panchagarh	1656	Sunni	Either established by Malik Uddin or Dost Muhammad
Chini Masjid		Saidpur, Nilphamari	1863	Sunni	Also known as Glass Masjid; and has 27 minars.
Jamalpur Jame Masjid		Pirganj, Thakurgaon	1867	Sunni	Also known as Jamalpur Zamindar Bari Jame Masjid
Balia Mosque		Vulli Bazar, Balia Union, Thakurgaon Sadar	1910	Sunni	Established by Meher Bakhsh Chowdhury
Baitul Falah Jame Mosque		Sarkarpara, Boroshoshi, Boda, Panchagarh	2013	Sunni	Built by Muhammad Safiul Islam ibn Qasim ad-Din, capacity of 1000

==== Dinajpur District ====
Name	Image	Location	Year (CE)	Tradition	Notes
Sura Masjid		Ghoraghat Upazila	1504	Sunni	
Nayabad Masjid		Kaharole Upazila	1793	Sunni	
Shopnopuri Central Mosque		Shopnopuri, Aftabganj, Nawabganj Upazila	before 2025	Sunni	
Dinajpur Police Line Mosque		Dinajpur Police Line		Sunni	

==== Gaibandha District ====
Name	Image	Location	Year (CE)	Tradition	Notes
Masta Masjid		Masta, Karamdaha Union, Gobindaganj Upazila	16th century	Sunni	Established by Badshah Faqir
Mahimaganj Masjid		Gobindaganj Upazila	1945	Sunni	Established by Ahmad Husayn
Qadir Bakhsh Mandal Masjid		Palashbari Upazila		Sunni	
Jamalpur Shahi Mosque		Boro Jamalpur, Sadullapur Upazila		Sunni	

==== Kurigram District ====
Name	Image	Location	Year (CE)	Tradition	Notes
Laldighi Mosque		Badarganj Upazila	Late 17th century	Sunni	
Dariapur Masjid		Dariapur, Pirganj	1718	Sunni	
Mekurtari Shahi Mosque		Mekurtari, Rajarhat	Mughal era	Sunni	
Chandamari Mosque		Chandamari, Rajarhat	Mughal era	Sunni	
Sardarpara Jame Mosque		Sardarpara, Kurigram Sadar		Sunni	
Qazi Mosque		Ulipur Upazila		Sunni	Established by Qazi Qutbuddin

==== Lalmonirhat District ====
Name	Image	Location	Year (CE)	Tradition	Notes
Lost Mosque		Majader Ara, Ramdas Mauza, Panchagram Union, Lalmonirhat	689	Sunni	Considered to be the oldest mosque in South Asia, also called the Lost Mosque
Nidaria Mosque		Qismat Nagarband Mauza, Ward 3, Panchagram Union, Lalmonirhat	1763	Sunni	Built by Subahdar Mansur Khan
One Row Mosque		Goral Union, Kaliganj Upazila, Lalmonirhat	Mughal era	Sunni	It can accommodate a single row for prayers, where 14-15 people can pray together

==== Rangpur District ====
Name	Image	Location	Year (CE)	Tradition	Notes
Begum Rokeya's Masjid		Payraband, Mithapukur	17th century	Sunni	Named after the nearby house of Begum Rokeya
Mithapukur Grand Masjid		Mithapukur	1811	Sunni	
Kali Amin Masjid		Manthana, Barabil Union, Gangachara	1841	Sunni	Established by Kali Amin and Dali Amin
Phulchouki Masjid		Mithapukur	Mughal era	Sunni	
Shah Ismail Ghazi Dargah Mosque		Pirganj Upazila	Mughal era	Sunni	
Pakhi Masjid		Mandrain, Lakkhitari Union, Gangachara	Mughal era	Sunni	
Helano Masjid		Jaidev, Gajghanta Union, Gangachara	Mughal era	Sunni	Established by Mamun Kuthiyal
Keramatia Jame Masjid		Munshipara, Rangpur City	19th century	Sunni	Established by Karamat Ali Jaunpuri
Dhap Ekramia Jame Masjid		PTI Road, Dhap-Katkipara, Ward 17, Rangpur City	2006	Sunni	Established by Mahbuba Begum (former vice-principal of Cantonment College)
CC Central Mosque		Carmichael College, Lalbag, Rangpur City		Sunni	

=== Sylhet Division ===
==== Habiganj District ====
Name	Image	Location	Year (CE)	Tradition	Notes
Shankarpasha Shahi Masjid		Uchail-Shankarpasha, Rajiura, Habiganj Sadar Upazila	1493	Sunni	Also known as Uchail Mosque.
Mirzatula Masjid		Mirjatula, Bahubal Upazila	Sultanate era	Sunni	Very old mosque

==== Moulvibazar District ====
Name	Image	Location	Year (CE)	Tradition	Notes
Goyghor Masjid		Goyghor, Mostafapur Union, Moulvibazar Sadar	1476	Sunni	
Jiladpur Mosque		Jiladpur, Ward 1, Ashidron Union, Sreemangal Upazila	Late 16th century	Sunni	
Rabir Bazar Jame Masjid		Rabir Bazar, Prithimpasha Union, Kulaura Upazila	Late 18th century	Sunni	Established by Begum Talibunnesa Khatun of Chhoto Saheb Bari in Prithimpasha village. Example of Mughal architecture.
Lawachara Jame Masjid		Lawachara National Park, Kamalganj Upazila	1967	Sunni	Includes a female-only prayer area
Mohammad Keramat Ali Jame Masjid		Keramat Nagar, Kamalganj Upazila	1967	Sunni	Founded by MNA Md. Keramat Ali

==== Sunamganj District ====
Name	Image	Location	Year (CE)	Tradition	Notes
Pagla Jame Masjid		Raypur, West Pagla, South Sunamganj	1931	Sunni	Also known as Raypur Boro Masjid
Islampur Mosque		Islampur, Syedpur Shaharpara Union, Jagannathpur Upazila	1977	Sunni	Better known as Islampur Jame Masjid, contains a pond
Lakeshor Central Mosque		Lakeshor, Chhatak Upazila		Sunni	Also known as East and Central Lakeshor Jame Masjid
Cement Factory Mosque		Chhatak Cement Factory		Sunni	
Budhrail Jame Mosque		Budhrail, Syedpur Shaharpara Union, Jagannathpur Upazila		Sunni	
North Budhrail Jame Mosque		North Budhrail, Syedpur Shaharpara Union, Jagannathpur		Sunni	
Bhatipara Mosque		Bhatipara Zamindar Bari, Derai Upazila		Sunni	

==== Sylhet District ====
Name	Image	Location	Year (CE)	Tradition	Notes
Shah Jalal Dargah Masjid		Dargah Mahalla, Ward 1, Sylhet	1500	Sufi	Mosque located next to the Dargah of Shah Jalal.
Ghayebi Dighi Masjid		Barothakuri, Zakiganj, Sylhet District	17th century	Sunni	
Sajid Raja Bari Mosque		Atgram, Zakiganj Upazila, Sylhet District	1740	Sunni	Established by Muqaddam Miah Chowdhury
Delwar Hossain Chowdhury Jame Masjid		Nurpur, Fenchuganj, Sylhet District		Sunni	Established by Mahmud Us Samad Chowdhury, the son of Delwar.
Islampur Jame Masjid		Islampur, Fenchuganj, Sylhet District		Sunni	
Shah Paran Mazar Masjid		Shah Paran Thana, Sylhet		Sufi	Adjacent to the mazar (mausoleum) of Shah Paran

== Eidgahs ==
Name	Image	Location	Year	Denomination	Notes
Dinajpur Gor-e-Shahid Central Eidgah		Dinajpur	2015	Sunni	Largest in Bangladesh and Asia
Dhanmondi Shahi Eidgah		Dhanmondi, Dhaka	1640	Sunni	Oldest surviving Mughal monument in Dhaka city.
Sylhet Shahi Eidgah		Ward 18, Sylhet	17th century	Sunni	
Khan Bari Eidgah		Khan Bari, Ghaghra Lashkar, Hatibandha Union, Jhenaigati, Sherpur District	Mughal era	Sunni	
