= Boali Sakhipur =

Coordinates: 24.2661°N 90.1615°E

Boali বোয়ালী
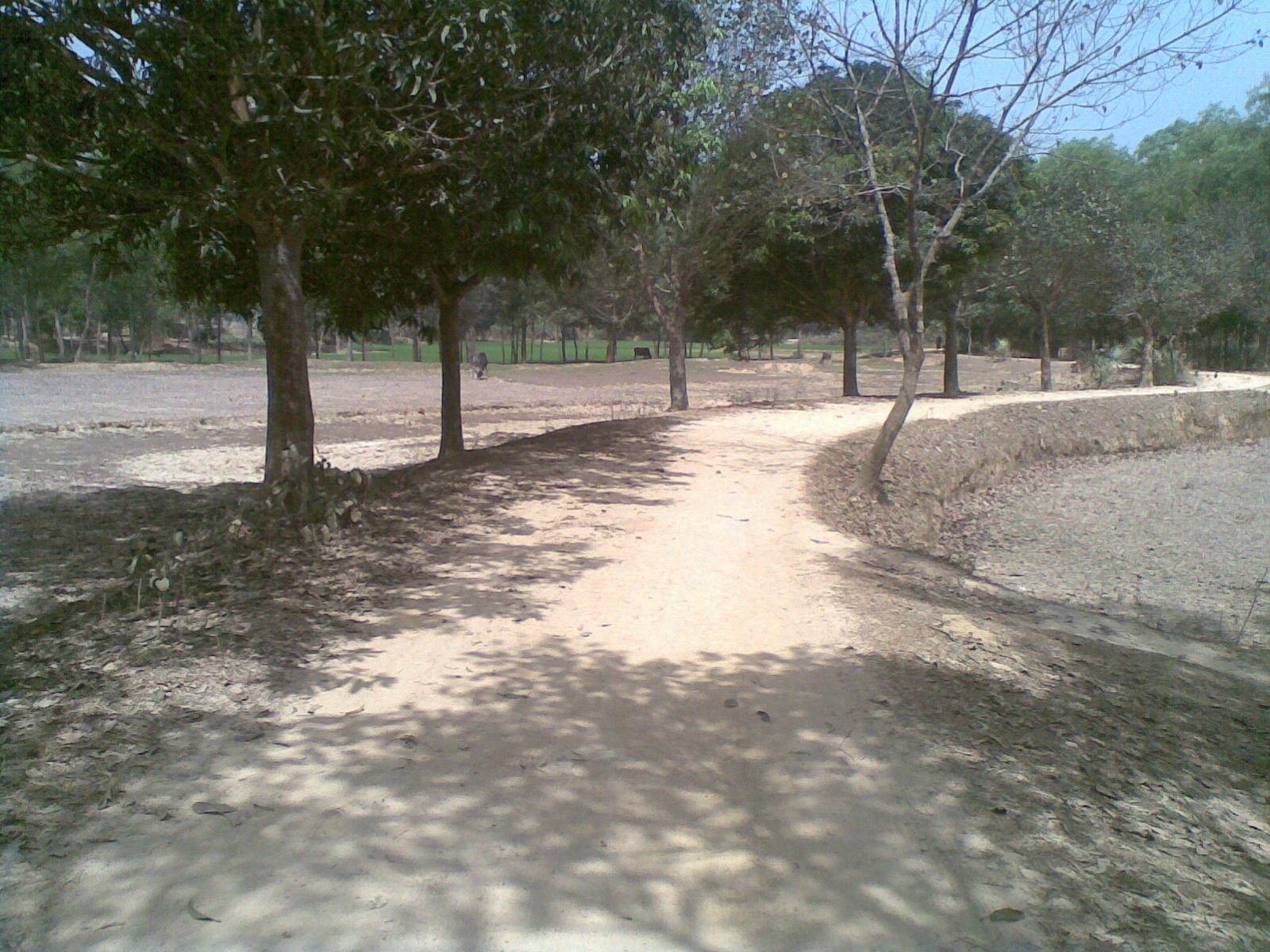
- Boali

- Location in Bangladesh
- Country: Bangladesh
- Division: Dhaka Division
- District: Tangail District
- Upazila: Sakhipur Upazila
- Union: Jadabpur Union

Population
  - Total: 3,320
- Time zone: UTC+6 (BST)
- Postal code: 1950

Boali (Bengali: বোয়ালী) is a village in Sakhipur Upazila under Tangail District of the Division of Dhaka, Bangladesh.

== Demographics ==
According to the 2011 Bangladesh census, Boali had 875 households and a population of 3,320.

== Education ==
There is only one Degree College, one secondary school, one primary school, one Dakhil Madrasa. and a Hafizi Madrasha in the village.

1. Boali Degree College
2. B.L.S. Chashi High School
3. Boali Government Primary School
4. Sabuj Bangla Girls Dakhil Madrasha
5. Boali Hamius Sunnah Hafizia Madrasha
6. West Boali Government Primary School
7. M A Razzak Memorial Foundation-RMF-2020
8. Darul Ulum Halimatus Shadia (RA) Mohila Madrasha

== See alo ==
- List of villages in Bangladesh
