= Wali Khan Mosque =

Mosque in Chittagong, Bangladesh

- ওয়ালী খান মসজিদ
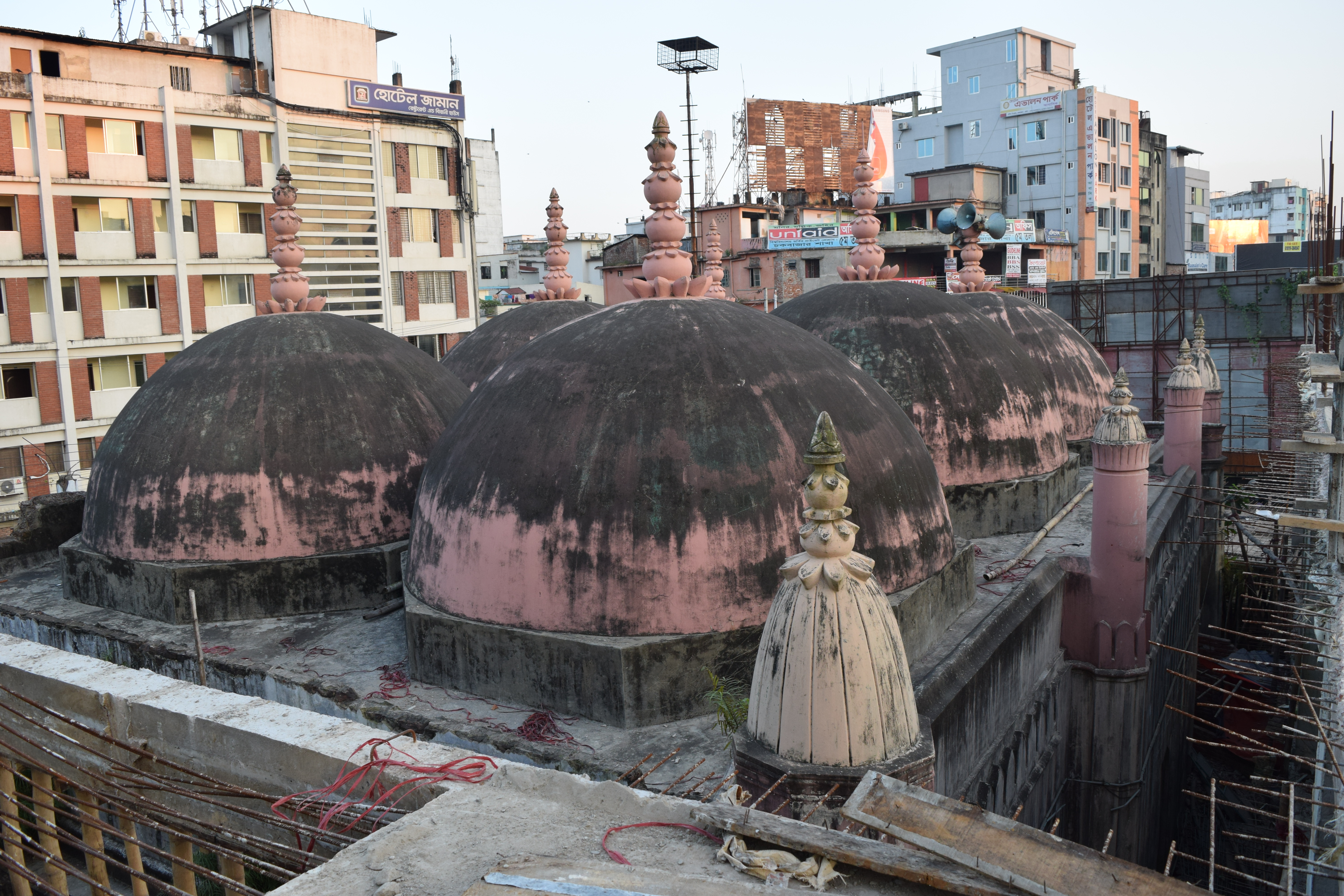
- Central part of the mosque

- Location of the mosque in Bangladesh

Religion
- Affiliation: Sunni Islam
- Ecclesiastical or organizational status: Mosque
- Status: Active

Location
- Location: Chawk Bazar, Chittagong
- Country: Bangladesh
- Interactive map of Wali Khan Mosque
- Coordinates: 22°21′31″N 91°50′15″E

Architecture
- Type: Mosque architecture
- Style: Mughal
- Completed: 1713 - 1716
- Dome: Six

The Wali Khan Mosque (Bengali: ওয়ালী খান মসজিদ) is an 18th-century Sunni mosque, located in Chittagong, Bangladesh. It is situated in the Chawk Bazar area of the city.

== History ==
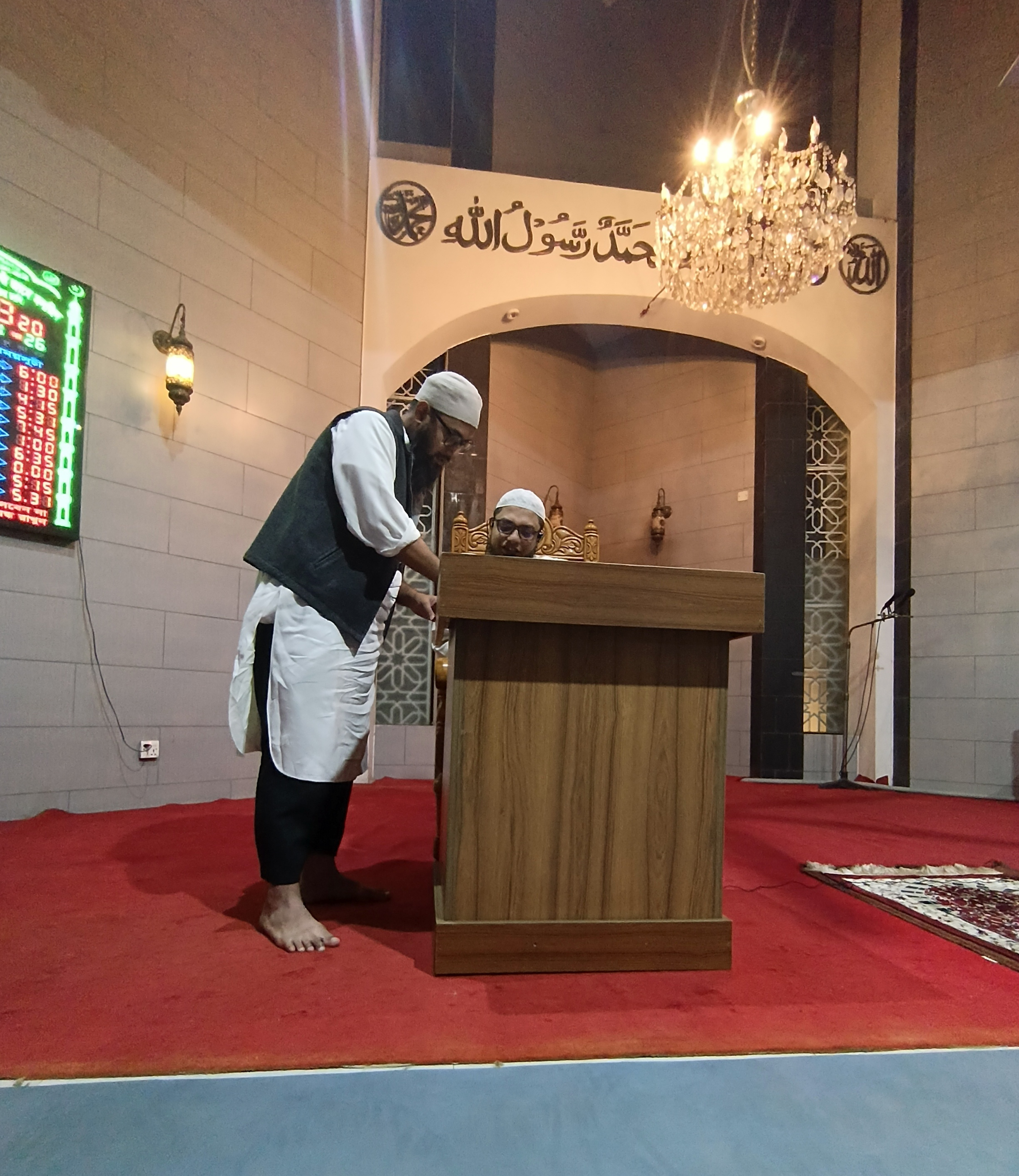
Mufti Sayed Ahmad teaching the Holy Quran at Wali Khan Mosque

The mosque was built between 1713 and 1716 by Wali Beg Khan, who was a Mughal Faujdar or General in Chittagong. Wali Khan, the founder of Chawk Bazar, also donated land for maintenance of the mosque.

== Notable worshippers ==
- Dula Mia Saudagar, merchant

== See also ==
- Islam in Bangladesh
- List of mosques in Bangladesh
