= Galua Paka Mosque =

Mosque in Rajapur, Jhalokathi, Bangladesh

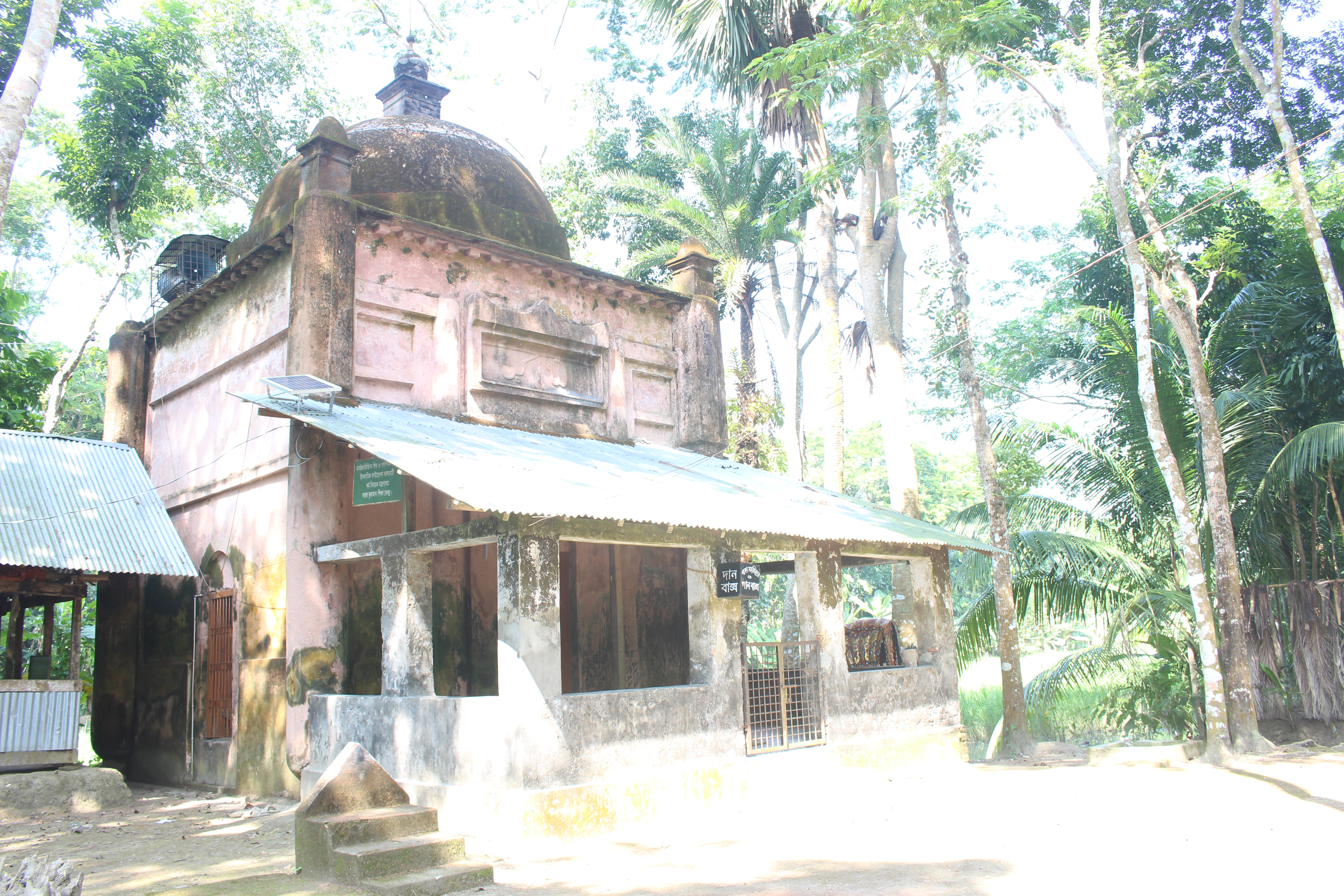

- Location within Bangladesh

Religion
- Affiliation: Islam
- Branch/tradition: Sunni Islam

Location
- Location: Rajapur Upazila, Barisal District
- Interactive map of Galua Paka Mosque

Architecture
- Type: Mosque
- Dome: 1

Galua Paka Mosque is an old mosque located in Rajapur Upazila of Jhalokathi District, Bangladesh. The mosque is situated about one kilometer east of Galua Bazar area on the Bhandaria–Rajapur highway, in Durgapur village.

== History ==
The mosque is located about one kilometer east of Galua Bazar in Jhalokathi District, near Barabari. It was built around 300 years ago by a local influential Muslim named Mahmudjan Akand in 1122 Bengali year. The construction period is assumed from an abandoned inscription found near the mosque.

According to local legend, while clearing the bushes around the mosque for renovation, several large poisonous snakes appeared. Following the advice of a local religious leader, a part of the mosque was opened, and the snakes then left the place. The mosque is made of terracotta bricks and has a relatively wide base. The bricks are no longer visible today as the structure has since been renovated.

During the period before Bangladesh’s independence, when the mosque was about to collapse, a local philanthropist, F.M.A. Kuddus Khan, took the initiative to renovate it. The front veranda of the mosque was later extended. In 1999, the Government of Bangladesh brought the mosque under the Department of Archaeology. Consequently, the government allocated funds for its restoration work.

== See also ==
- List of mosques in Bangladesh
