= Noor Manikchar Jame Mosque =

Mosque in Debidwar, Comilla, Bangladesh

Coordinates: 23°29′57″N 90°58′02″E

- নূর মানিকচর জামে মসজিদ

Religion
- Affiliation: Islam
- Ownership: Department of Archaeology
- Status: Preserved

Location
- Location: Comilla District, Debidwar Upazila
- Country: Bangladesh

The Noor Manikchar Mosque (Bengali: নূর মানিকচর জামে মসজিদ) is an ancient mosque located in Nurmanikchar village of Debidwar Upazila in Comilla District, Bangladesh.

== Location ==
The mosque is located about 18 kilometres west of Comilla and about half a kilometre north of the Nurmanikchar bus station on the Dhaka–Chittagong highway.

== History ==
The Noor Manikchar Mosque is considered the oldest mosque in Debidwar and is estimated to be about five hundred years old. It was built in the fifteenth century by the late Syed Nur Ahmed Qaderi Pir. When the saint Syed Nur Ahmed Qaderi came to Debidwar, the area was known as Balmali’s Char. Later, the village was renamed Nurmanikchar after him, and the mosque was also named after the village.

== Structure ==
The mosque is a seven-domed structure. The mosque measures approximately 10 feet in length and 5 feet in width. Around 20–25 worshippers can offer prayers at the same time. Built with lime and surki, the interior of the mosque contains beautiful ornamental decorations. The roof of the mosque has 11 domes in total, including 7 on the main roof and 4 at the four corners of the mosque. However, due to lack of preservation and renovation, most of the domes have almost disappeared today. The decorative layers on the outer walls of the mosque have also been damaged due to lack of proper care. In many places the plaster is falling off, and moss has grown on the walls due to rainwater, diminishing the beauty of the mosque.

== See also ==
- List of mosques in Bangladesh
