= Mehar Nazar Mamud Haji Bari Jame Masjid =

Mosque in Cumilla,Chandina, Bangladesh

Mehar Nazar Mamud Haji Bari Jame Mosque
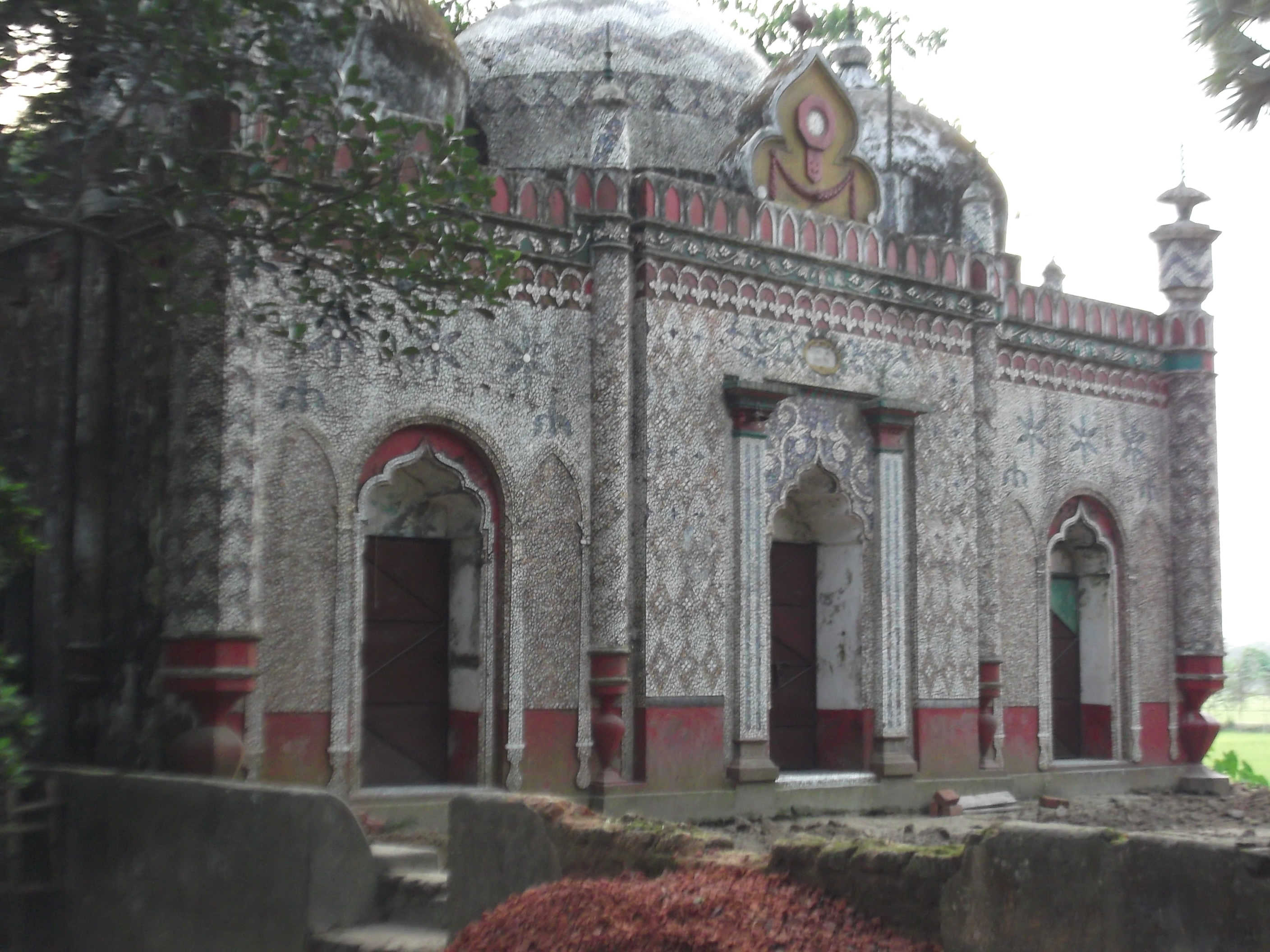

Religion
- District: Cumilla District
- Status: Active

Location
- Location: Cumilla District,Chandina Upazila, Bangladesh
- Country: Bangladesh

Architecture
- Founder: Nazar Mamud
- Materials: Porcelain

Built during the British period, Mehar Nazar Mamud Haji Bari Jame Masjid is a mosque located in Mehar village of 9 No. Maijchar Union, about 10 kilometres south-west of the headquarters of Chandina Upazila in Cumilla District.

== Construction and naming ==
According to the inscription on the mosque, it was built in 1925 CE (1331 Bangla year) by the distinguished philanthropist and religious figure Alhaj Nazar Mamud of Mehar village. The mosque was named Mehar Nazar Mamud Haji Bari Jame Mosque.

== History ==
According to elderly residents of the area and the grandchildren of Haji Sahib, during the British period, under the rule of Bir Bikram Kishore Manikya Bahadur of Tripura, and during the zamindari of Bhairab Chandra Singha of Mahichail village in Chandina, the mosque was built with the permission of the zamindar so that local Muslims could perform prayers. It was constructed on about 10 decimals of land. It is said that the zamindar arrived riding an elephant and inaugurated the construction of the mosque.

== Description ==
The mosque measures about 40 feet in length and 20 feet in width and stands approximately 35 feet high. Three large domes are constructed above the roof. There are three entrances on the eastern side for worshippers to enter the mosque, while there are two windows on the north and south sides. A pond covering about 120 decimals was excavated on the southern side for ablution and bathing, with paved ghats.

For feeding worshippers during the Night of Qadr in Ramadan and for covering the expenses of the mosque’s imam and muezzin, Haji Sahib endowed 264 decimals of land as waqf in the name of the mosque. It is also known that he performed the Hajj by travelling on foot to Mecca. The mosque was constructed using lime and surki, and the walls are about 3–4 feet thick, which keeps the interior warm in winter and cool in summer. There is an open space in front of the mosque for religious discussions. Due to the increasing number of worshippers, the open space in front was later connected to the mosque and expanded by the grandchildren of Haji Sahib.

== Design and decoration ==
Among the four walls of the mosque, the entire front wall is decorated with intricate designs made from broken porcelain plates. The interior pulpit (minbar) also contains beautiful decorative work, which attracts visitors.

== See also ==
- List of mosques in Bangladesh
