= Laldighi Mosque =

Mosque in Rangpur, Bangladesh

- লালদীঘি মসজিদ
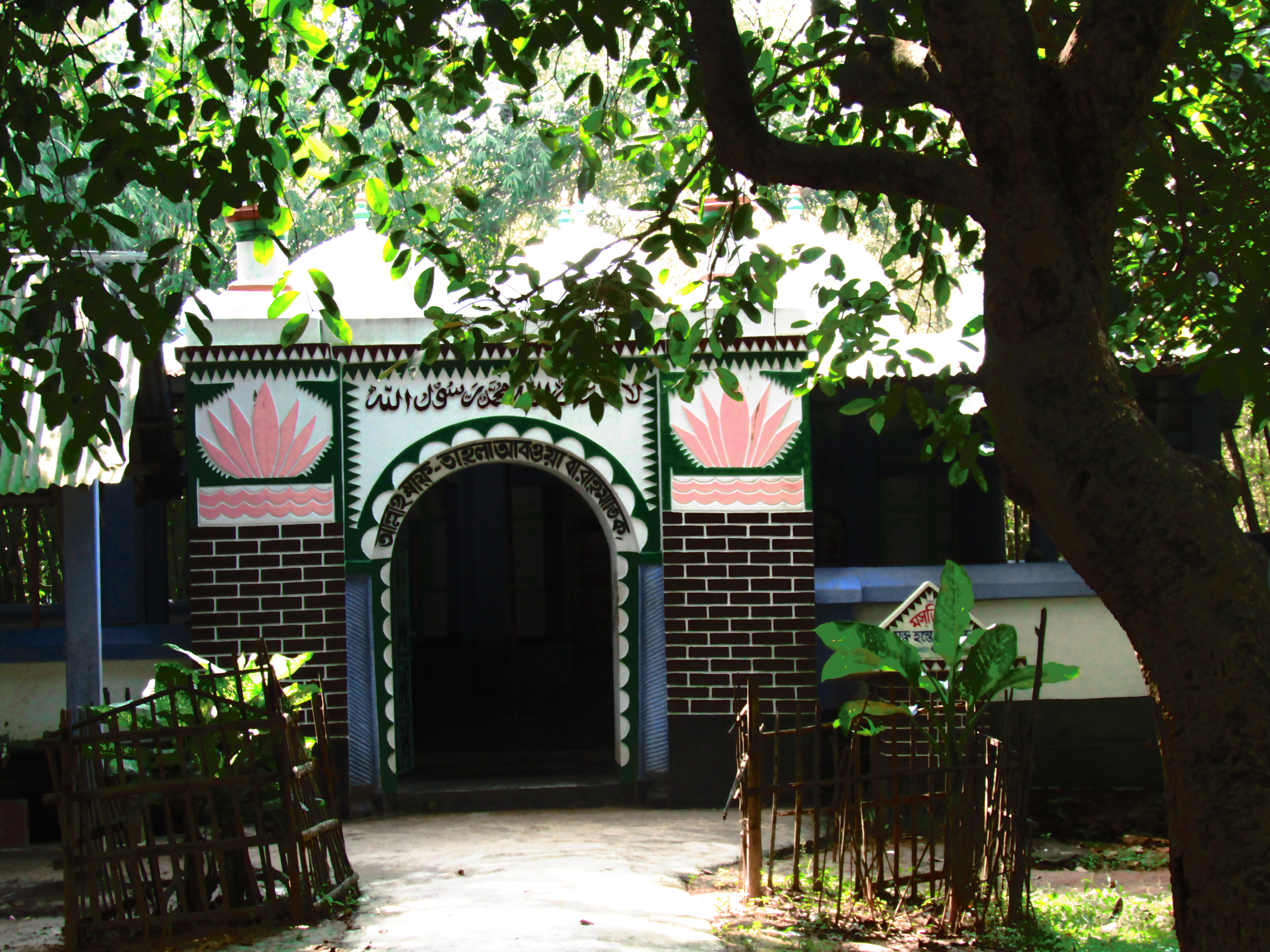

- Location of the mosque in Bangladesh

Religion
- Affiliation: Sunni Islam
- Ecclesiastical or organizational status: Mosque
- Status: Active

Location
- Location: Badarganj Upazila, Rangpur
- Country: Bangladesh
- Interactive map of Laldighi Mosque
- Coordinates: 25°43′36″N 88°58′51″E

Architecture
- Type: Mosque architecture
- Completed: c. 17th century

The Laldighi Mosque (Bengali: লালদীঘি মসজিদ) is an ancient Sunni mosque located at Laldighi, in Badarganj upazila of Rangpur district, Bangladesh.

== History ==
The mosque is believed to be built in the late 17th to early 18th century. The exact date of construction is not known. There was an inscription tablet located near the eastern facade of the mosque, but this has gone missing. According to Banglapedia, the mosque's architectural style is similar to nearby mosques (such as the Gorai Mosque, completed in 1680 CE, of Kishoreganj, and the Chaksri Mosque, completed in c., the late 17th century, of Bagerhat).

The mosque fell into disuse, and was abandoned. During the late British rule in Bengal, this mosque was re-discovered, and cleared of the thick vegetation.

== Architecture ==
This mosques architecture is similar to Mughal sculptures.

== See also ==
- Islam in Bangladesh
- List of mosques in Bangladesh
