= Shah Shuja Mosque =

Mosque situated on Mughaltuli, Cumilla, Bangladesh

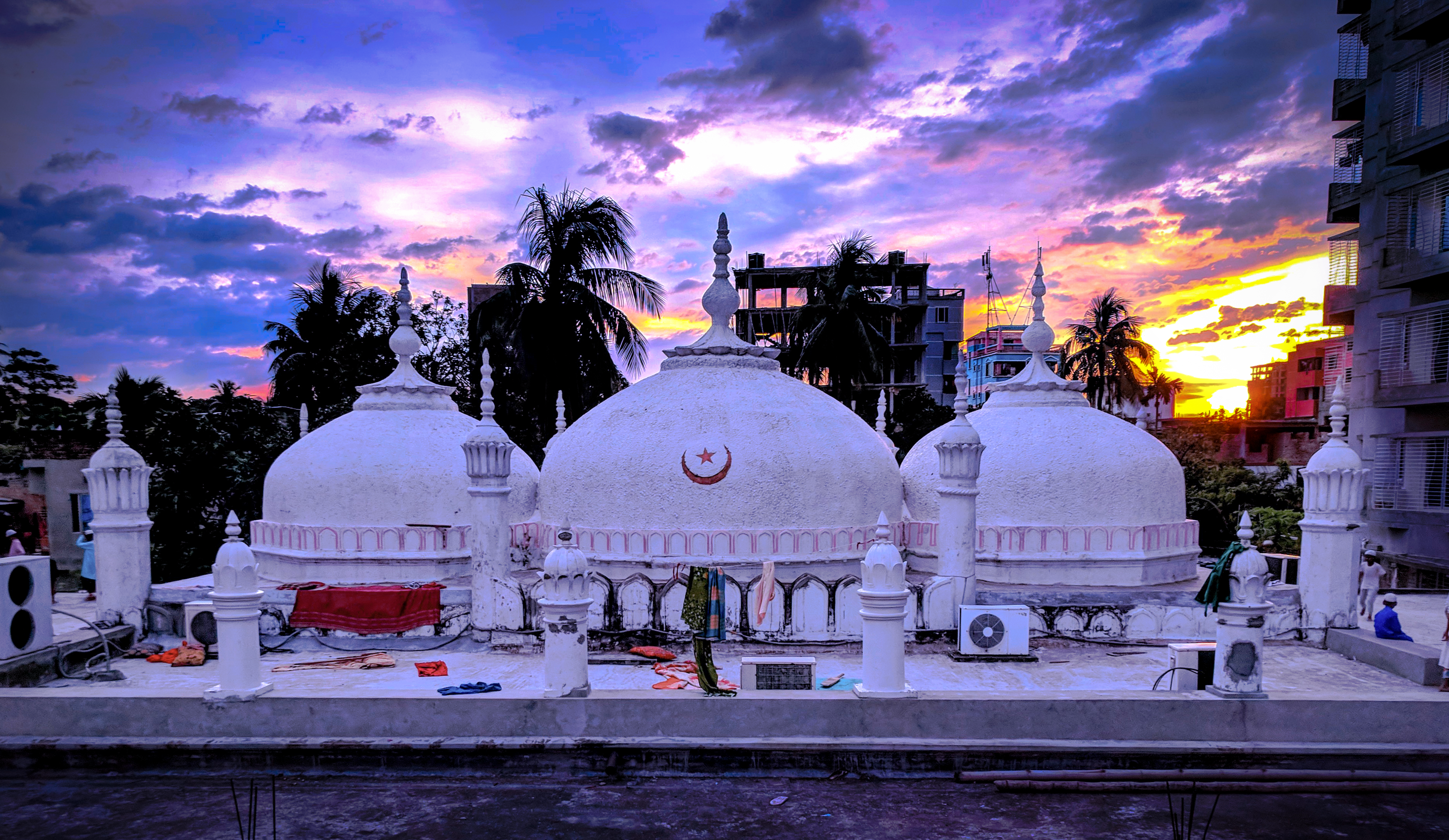
- Three large domes cover the prayer hall

- Location of the mosque in Bangladesh

Religion
- Affiliation: Islam
- Ecclesiastical or organizational status: Mosque
- Status: Active

Location
- Location: Mughaltuli, Cumilla, Chittagong Division
- Country: Bangladesh
- Interactive map of Shah Shuja Mosque
- Coordinates: 23°28′1″N 91°11′6″E

Architecture
- Type: Mosque architecture
- Style: Mughal
- Completed: c. 1658 CE

Specifications
- Dome: Three (maybe more)
- Minaret: Four

The Shah Shuja Mosque (Bengali: শাহ সুজা মসজিদ) is a mosque situated on Mughaltuli in Cumilla, in the Chittagong Division of Bangladesh. The construction period and architect of the mosque are disputed. No construction inscriptions have been found for the mosque.

== Overview ==
According to one opinion, the mosque was built by King Govindmanikya in memory of Shah Shuja. But according to another, it was during the reign of Shah Shuja Subahdar that a Mughal Faujdar built the mosque in the name of Shuja for soldiers to offer prayers.

The mosque is located on the banks of the old Gomti river in Mogaltuli area of Comilla district. Although there is a clear description about the construction period of the mosque, the date 1658 CE is given on the mosque's pylon.

The mosque is surrounded by four minarets, each topped by a small onion dome. Three large domes cover the main prayer hall.

== Gallery ==
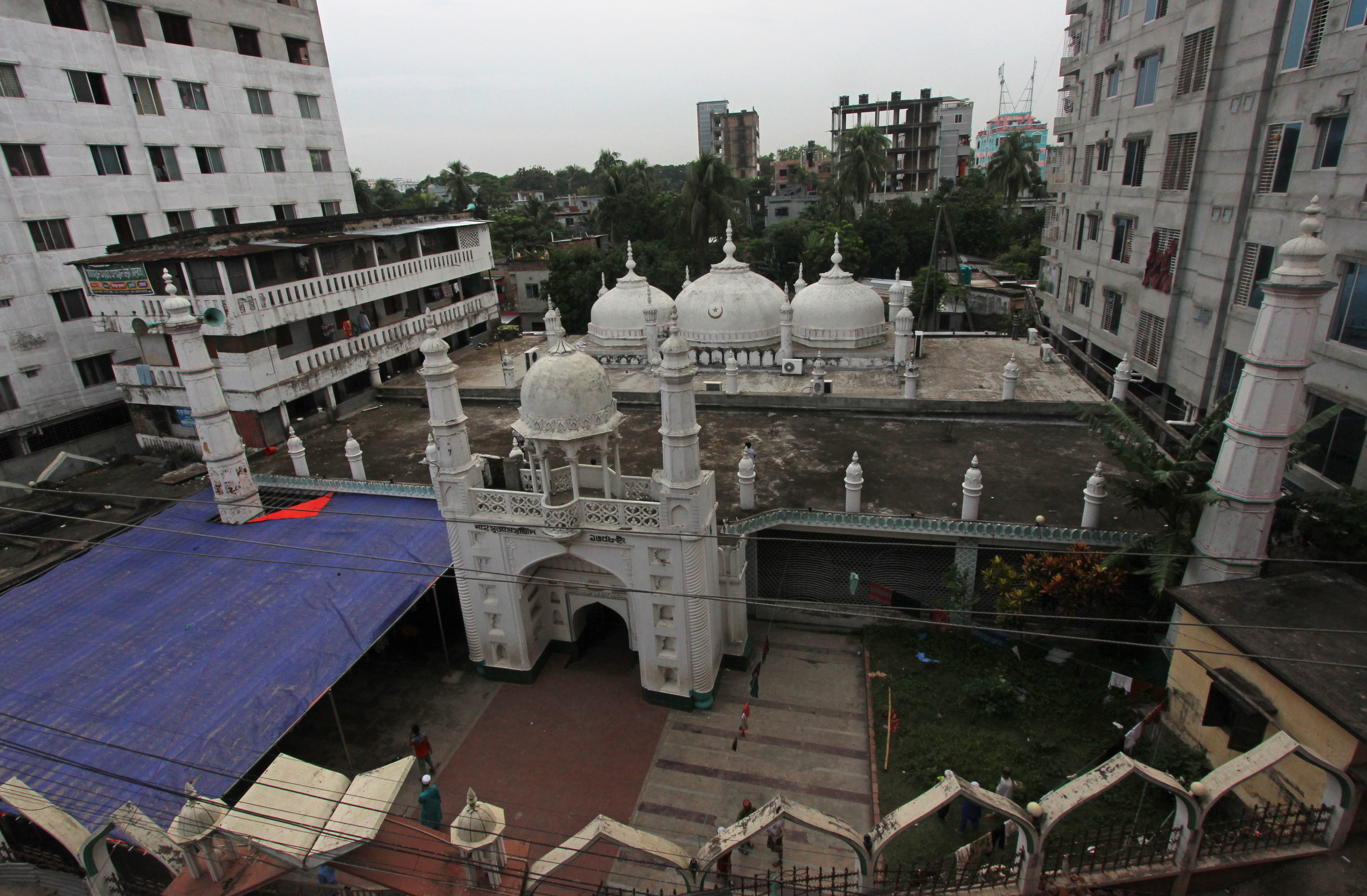
View of the mosque from above

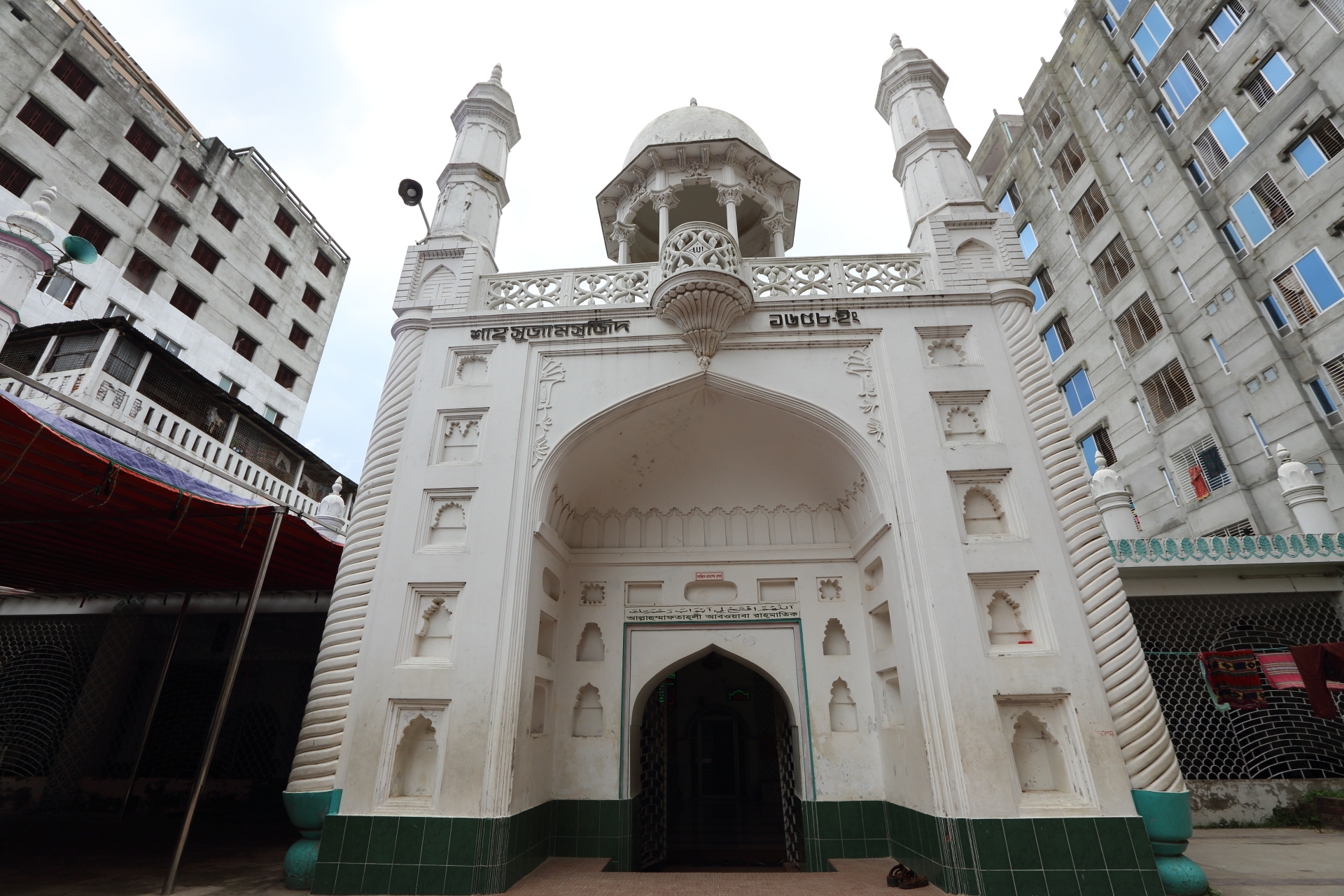
View of the mosque from the front

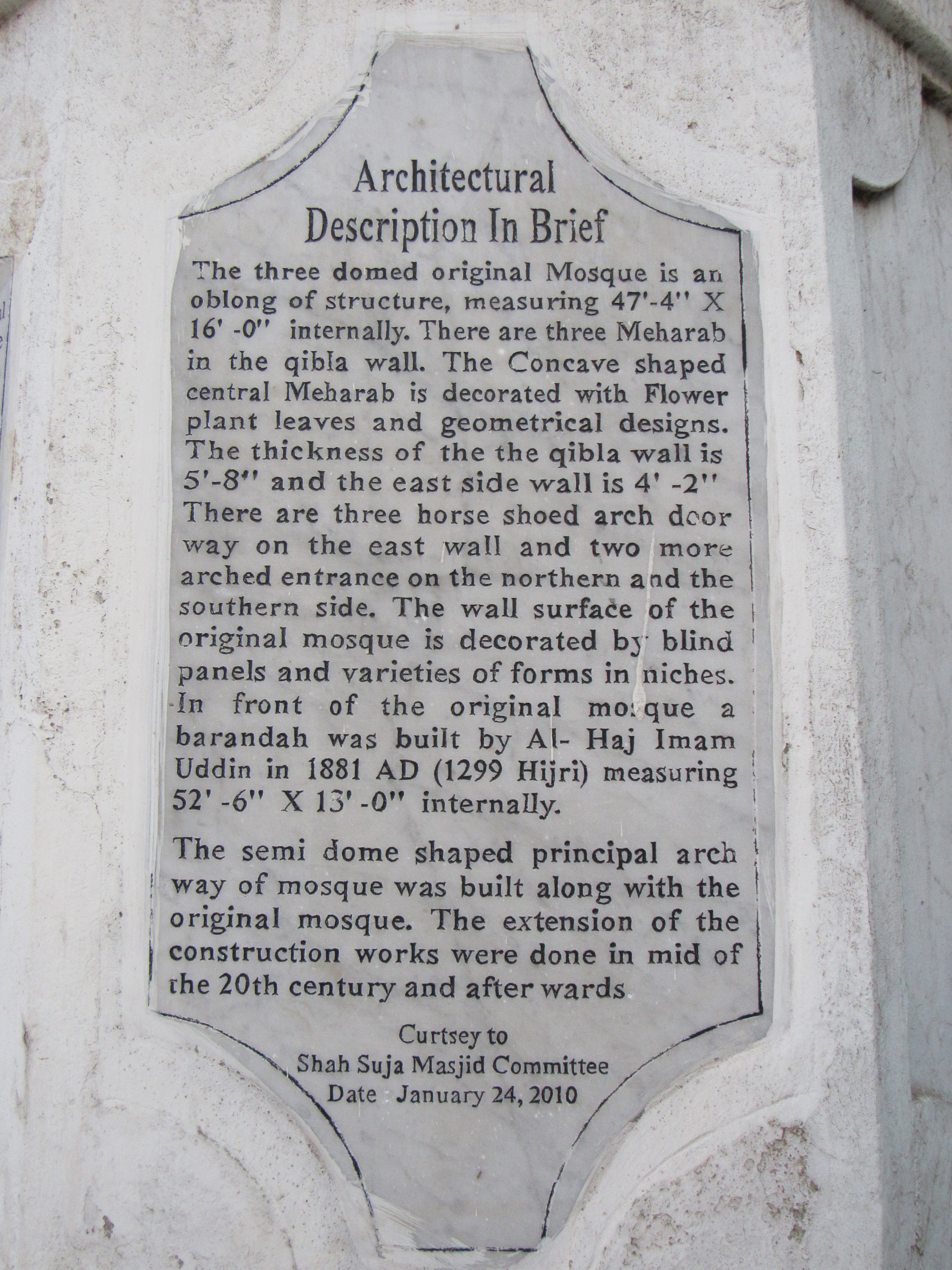
A later inscription on the mosque's portico

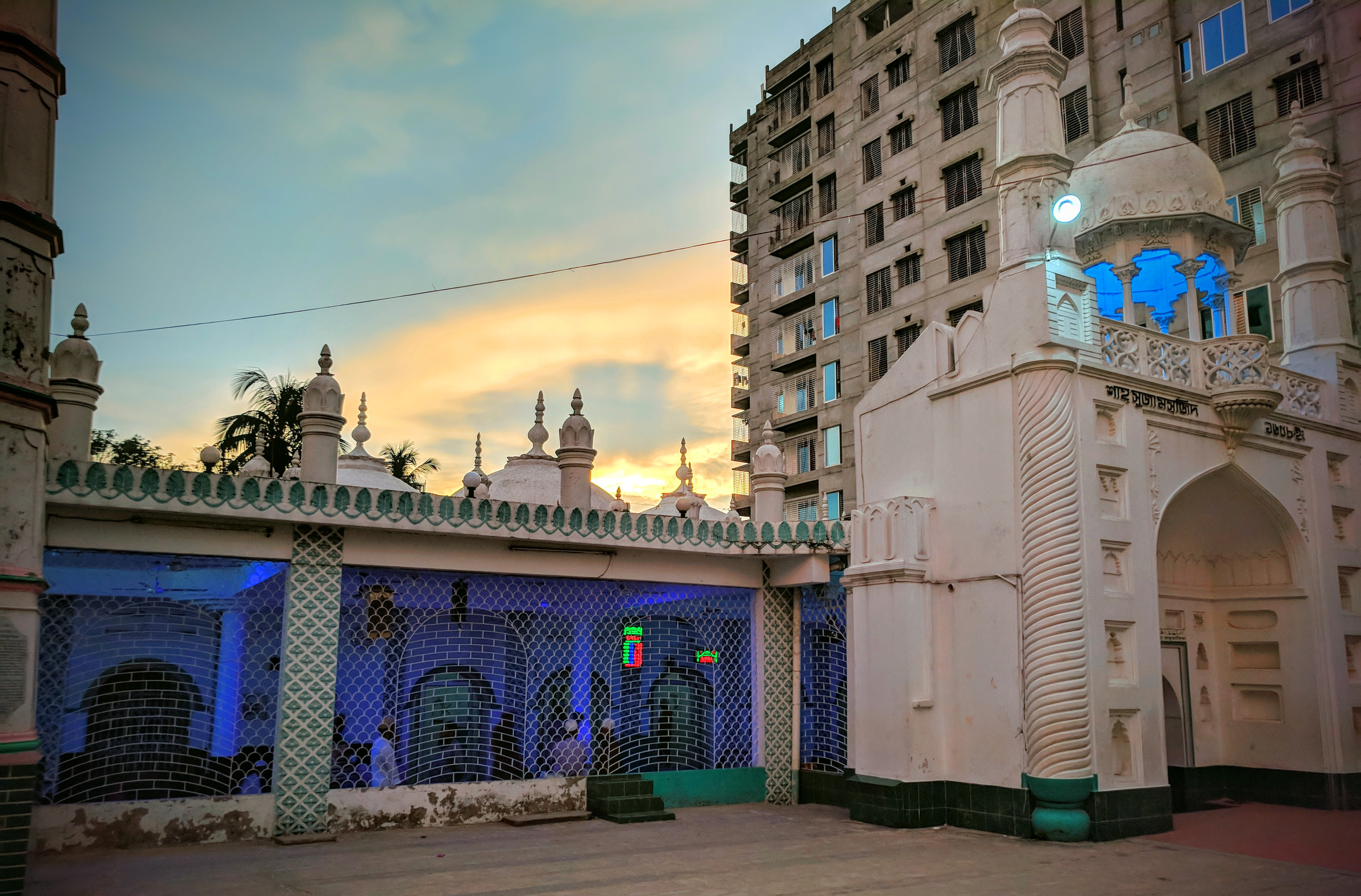
A part of the mosque

== See also ==
- Islam in Bangladesh
- List of mosques in Bangladesh
