= Dhanbari Mosque =

Historic mosque in Dhanbari, Tangail, Bangladesh

- ধনবাড়ী মসজিদ
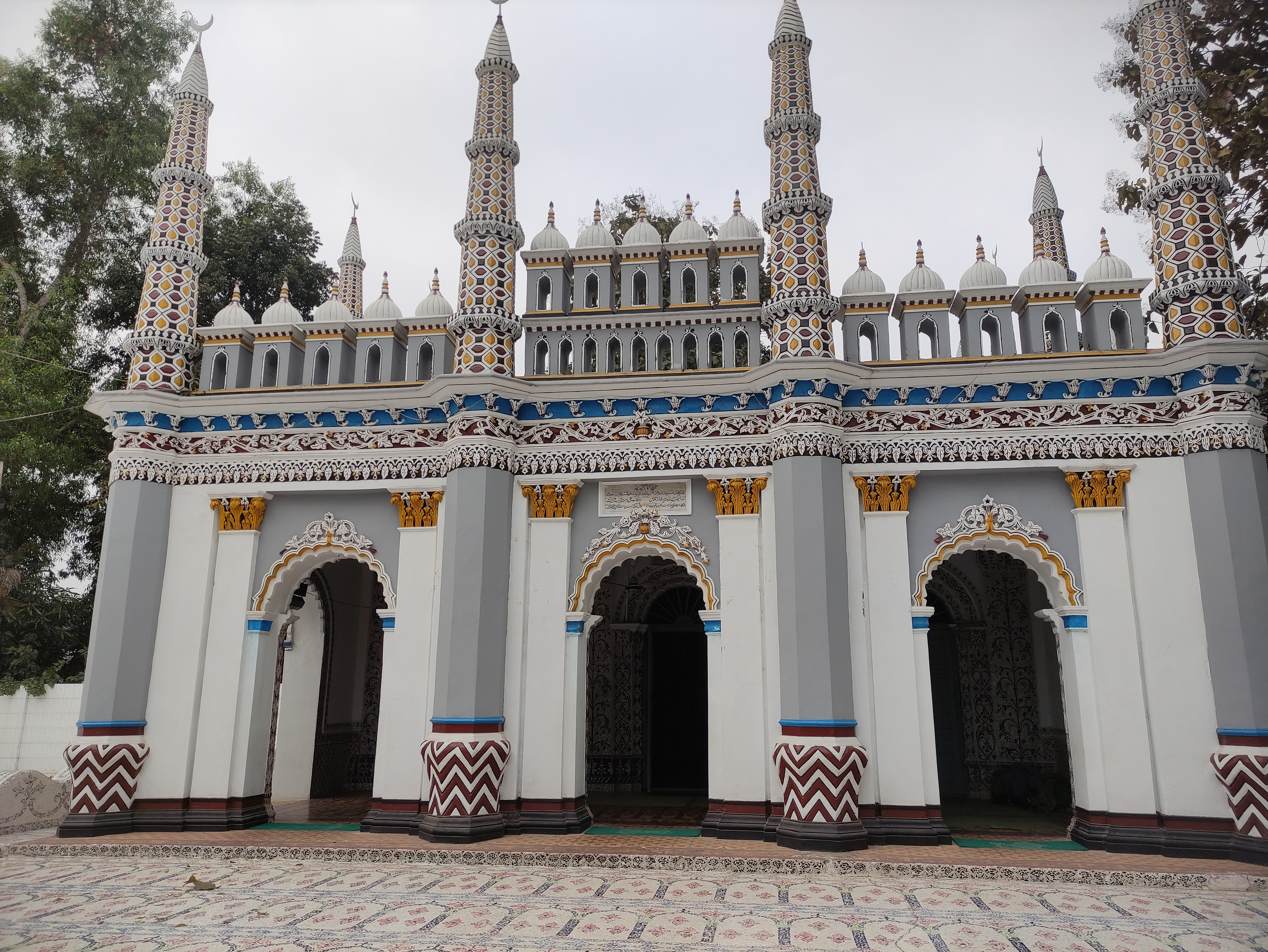

Religion
- Affiliation: Islam
- Ecclesiastical or organisational status: Mosque

Location
- Location: Dhanbari Upazila, Tangail District
- Country: Bangladesh
- Interactive map of Dhanbari Mosque

The Dhanbari Mosque (Bengali: ধনবাড়ী মসজিদ) is a historic mosque located in Dhanbari Upazila of Tangail District, Bangladesh. It is considered one of the notable examples of Mughal-era architecture in central Bangladesh.

== History ==
Local tradition holds that the mosque dates back to the Mughal period. After defeating a local zamindar, Ispinjar Khan and Manawar Khan were granted the Dhanbari estate, where they reportedly established the original mosque.

== See also ==
- Islam in Bangladesh
- List of mosques in Bangladesh
