= One Row Mosque =

Mosque of Lalmonirhat, Bangladesh

- এক কাতার মসজিদ
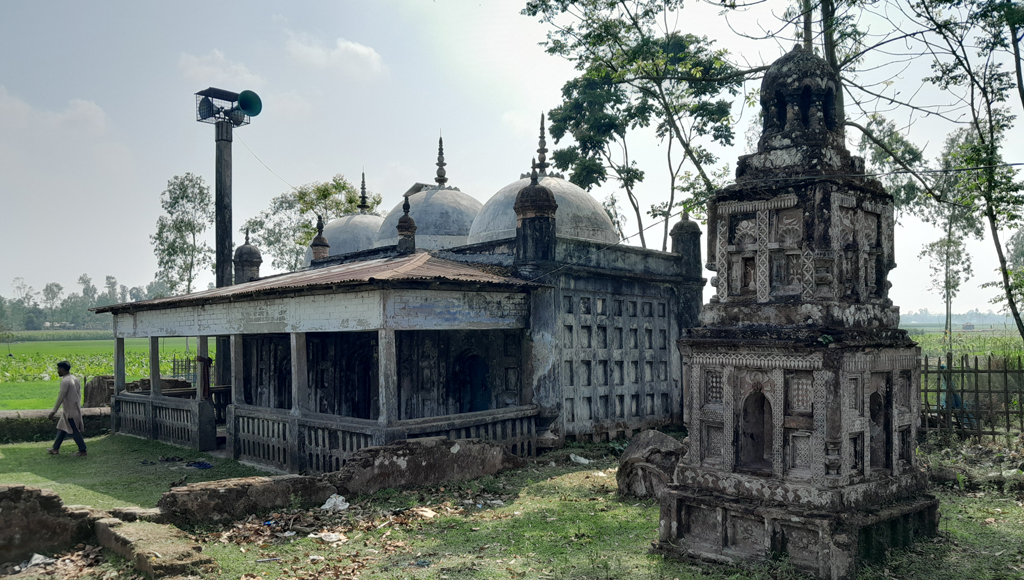

- Location of the mosque in Bangladesh

Religion
- Affiliation: Islam
- Ecclesiastical or organizational status: Mosque
- Status: Active

Location
- Location: Goral Union, Kaliganj Upazila, Lalmonirhat
- Country: Bangladesh
- Interactive map of One Row Mosque
- Coordinates: 25°59′51.256″N 89°18′23.742″E

Architecture
- Type: Mosque architecture
- Style: Mughal
- Established: Mughal era

Specifications
- Capacity: 14–15 worshipers
- Dome: Three
- Materials: Brick; limestone

The One Row Mosque (Bengali: এক কাতার মসজিদ) is a three-domed mosque located in the Lalmonirhat District of Bangladesh. It was built during the Mughal era.

== Architecture ==
The exact date of the construction mosque is unclear. Based on its Mughal style, it is believed to have been constructed during the Mughal era. As of 2024, some locals estimated that the mosque was over 500 years old.

The mosque can accommodate a single row for prayers, of approximately 14–15 worshipers; and hence its name. The mosque has three domes; and bricks and lime-surki were used in its construction.

To the left of the front of the mosque lies the tomb of the person who founded it, and on the right is the burial ground of the Shia community.

== See also ==
- Islam in Bangladesh
- List of mosques in Bangladesh
