= Pathagar Mosque =

Mosque in Jhenaidah, Bangladesh

Pathagar Mound
- পাঠাগার ঢিবি
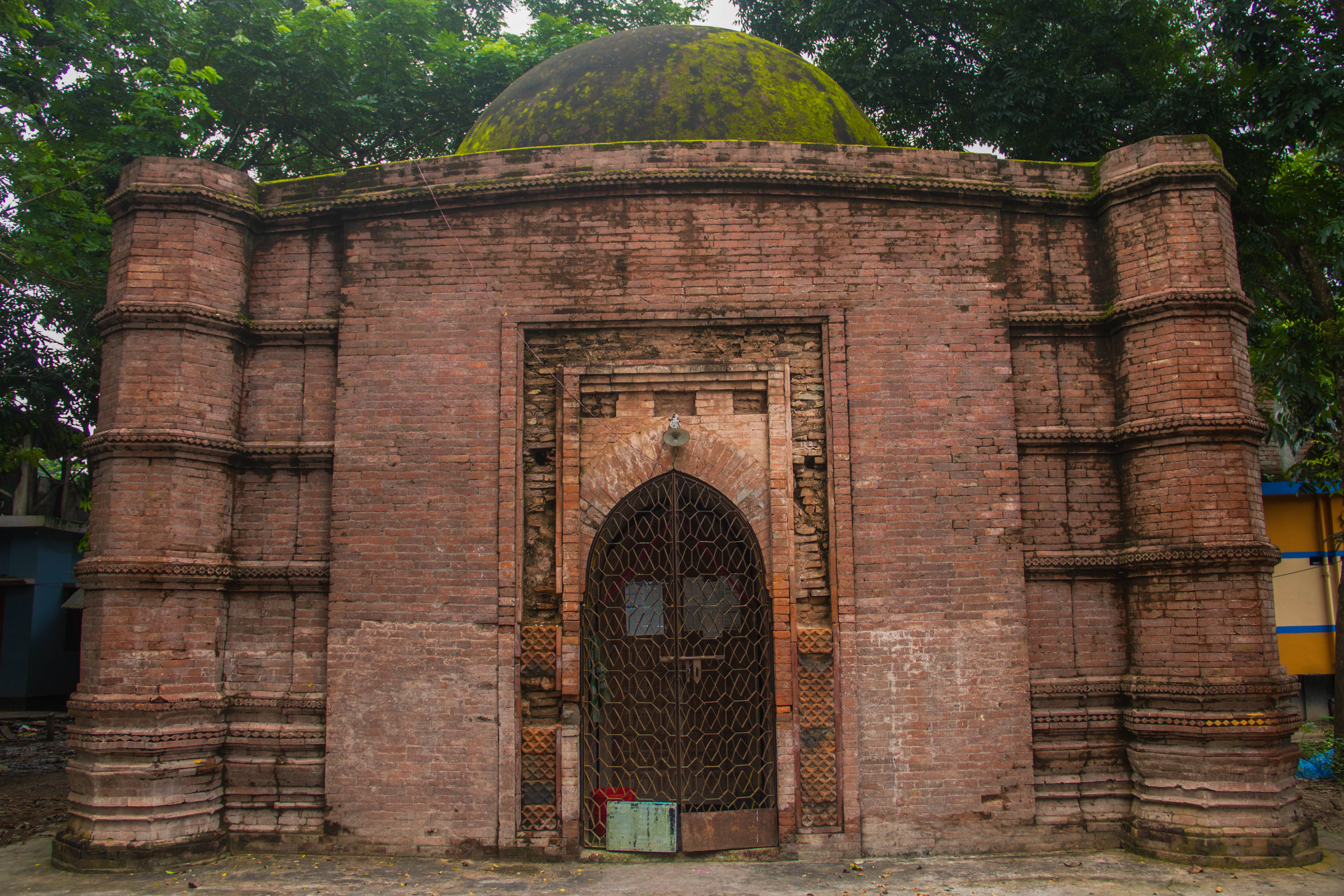

Religion
- Affiliation: Islam
- Status: Ruins

Location
- Location: Mithapukur, Barobazar Union, Kaliganj Upazila, Jhenaidah District, Bangladesh
- Interactive map of Pathagar Mound
- Coordinates: 23°18′15″N 89°08′57″E

Architecture
- Type: Mosque
- Style: Bengal Sultanate
- Groundbreaking: 14th–15th century (estimated)
- Completed: Unknown

Specifications
- Dome: 1
- Minaret: 4 (octagonal towers at corners)
- Materials: Red brick

Pathagar Mosque is an archaeological site located in Jhenaidah District, Bangladesh. It is situated 150 meters north of Taherpur Road in Mithapukur Mouza of Barobazar Union, Kaliganj Upazila.

== History ==
The Department of Archaeology (Bangladesh) conducted excavations in 1993 and discovered an ancient mosque at this mound. The upper part of the mosque was extensively damaged. In 2007, the Department of Archaeology restored the mosque's walls up to a height of 1.70 meters. Archaeologists estimate that the mosque was built during the Sultanate period.

=== Etymology ===
According to local tradition, this mound was a prosperous library during the Sultanate period. At that time, education, Quranic and Hadith teachings were conducted here. Various books were also available for reading. For this reason, the site became known as Pathagar Mound.

== Description ==
The rectangular Pathagar Mound measures 15 meters in length and 12 meters in width. Excavations revealed a comparatively small, square-shaped mosque. Each side of the mosque is 6.9 meters long, and the walls are 1.38 meters thick. Each corner of the mosque has an octagonal tower with a horizontal base. There are three entrances, one on the north, south, and east sides. All entrances are framed with right-angled geometric designs. On the west wall, there is a semi-circular mihrab decorated with terracotta designs on the inner side. The mosque has a single dome and is made of red bricks. Nearby is a large pond named Pithegara Pond.

== See also ==
- List of archaeological sites in Bangladesh
