= Bibi Maryam Mosque =

Mosque In Narayanganj, Bangladesh

Bibi Maryam Masjid
- বিবি মরিয়ম মসজিদ
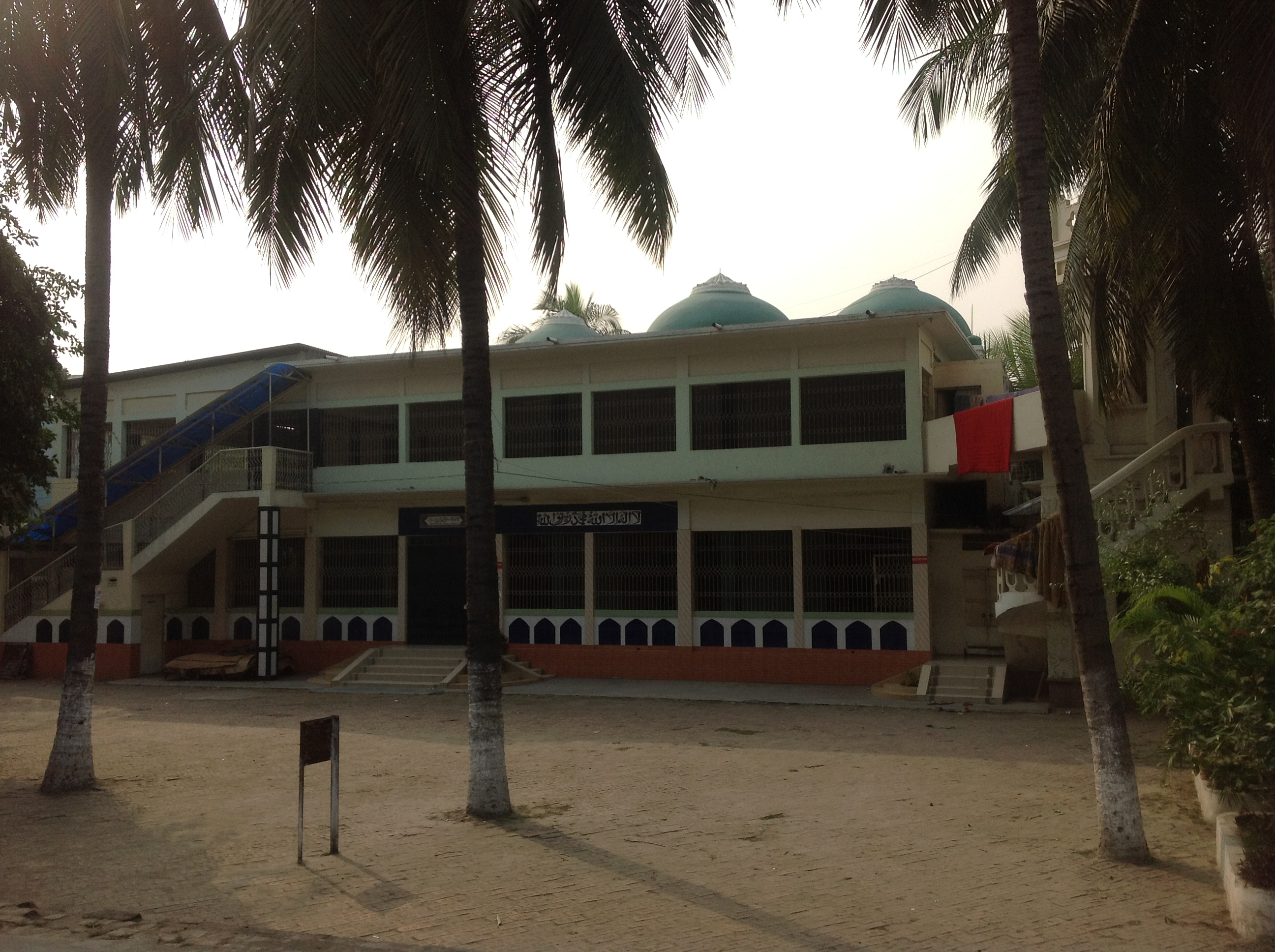

- Location within Bangladesh

Religion
- Affiliation: Sunni Islam

Location
- Location: 114 Mukarba Road, Killarpul, Narayanganj, Bangladesh
- Coordinates: 23.6320°N 90.5107°E

Architecture
- Type: Mosque
- Style: Mughal Architecture
- Established: c. 1664
- Interior area: 9,980 sq ft (927 m^{2})

The Bibi Maryam Mosque, also known as the Hajiganj Mosque, is in Hajiganj, Narayanganj. The mosque is said to have been constructed by Nawab Shaista Khan, Mughal subadar of Bengal. The construction of the mosque began in 1664 and finished in 1688. It took 24 years to complete. Bibi Maryam, apparently his daughter, is said to be buried nearby in a tomb. The mosque is a three-domed type, the central dome being more comprehensive than the side ones. The side domes are reduced by thickening the side walls instead of adding an intermediate half-dome, as seen in some Mughal mosques. The basal leaf decoration of the domes and the battlemented merlons speak of the standard style. The panel leaf decoration on the top of the roof is seen only on the front side. The eastern facade of the mosque has the usual three arched entrances, each opening under a half dome and the central one being more expansive than the side entrances. Two windows, one each on the south and north sides, are of later innovation. The four engaged corner towers, almost merged within the wall, are extended beyond the parapet. The interior hall shows simple lateral arches. The side bays are made square by thickening the side walls. The mosque has been repaired and renovated several times. It has significantly lost many of its original features through repairs since the corner towers are being wholly modernised. A veranda on masonry pillars on the eastern side has completely overshadowed the front view. It is now being used as a Jami mosque.

== History ==
Most historians suggest that Shaista Khan, the Mughal governor of the Bengal Subah from 1664 to 1688, built the mosque within a fortified complex in the early 1680s. Presumed to be Bibi Maryam's father, Khan named the site after his daughter's premature demise and also had her tomb built nearby.[1] Historians who have examined the building materials and applied construction techniques have found that both were exercised contemporaneously with Nawab Shaista Khan. According to the present mosque authority, Shaista Khan's family and administration formed the Muslim population of present-day Killarpul during its construction, which explains the limited accommodation. Even as late as the 1950s, Killarpul's population was almost monopolised by Hindus, with hardly ten Muslims appearing for congregational prayer. This starkly contrasts today, where hundreds of worshipers appear for worship.

== Architectural elements and style ==
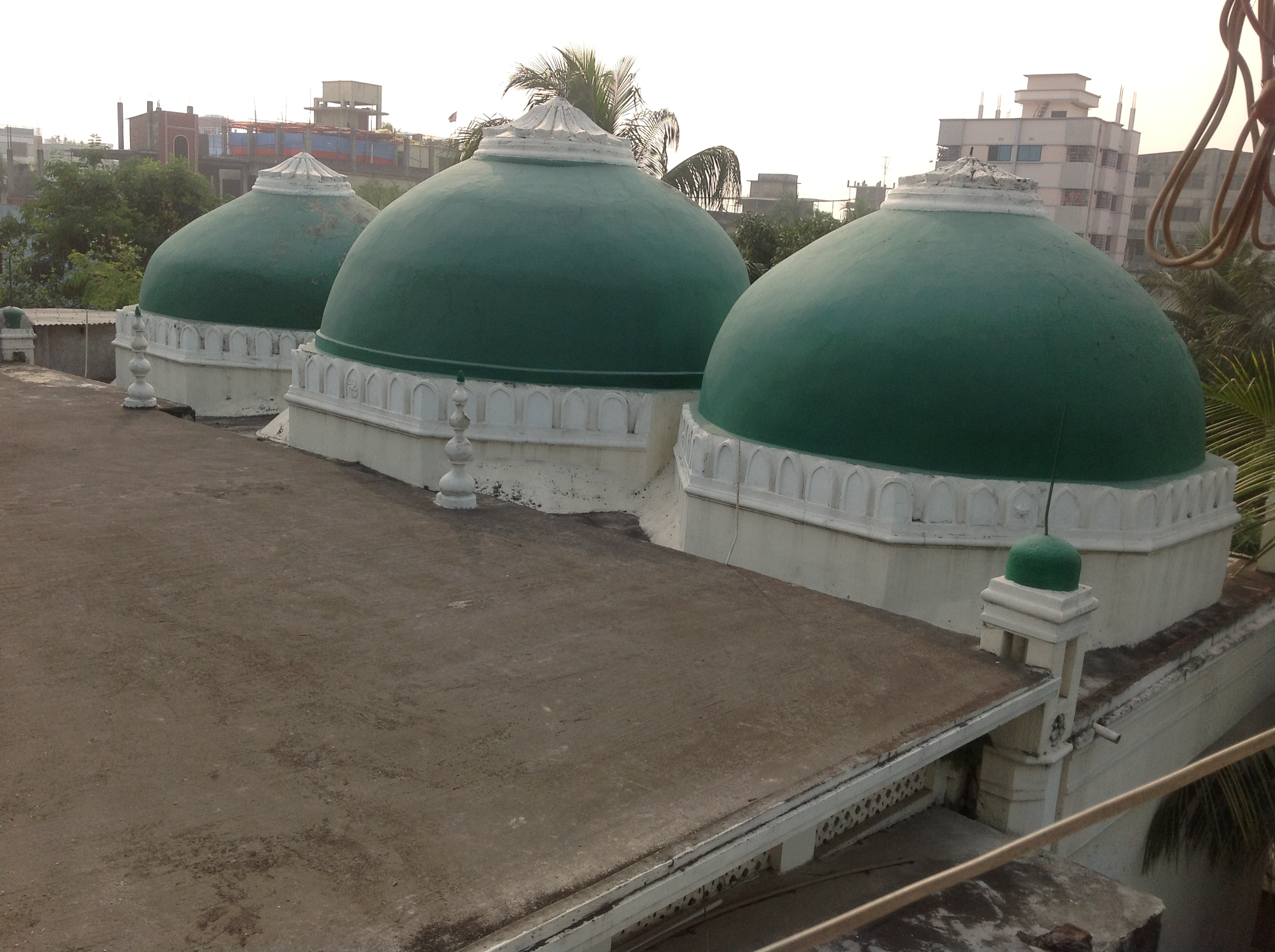
The three domes which were constructed in the 17th century

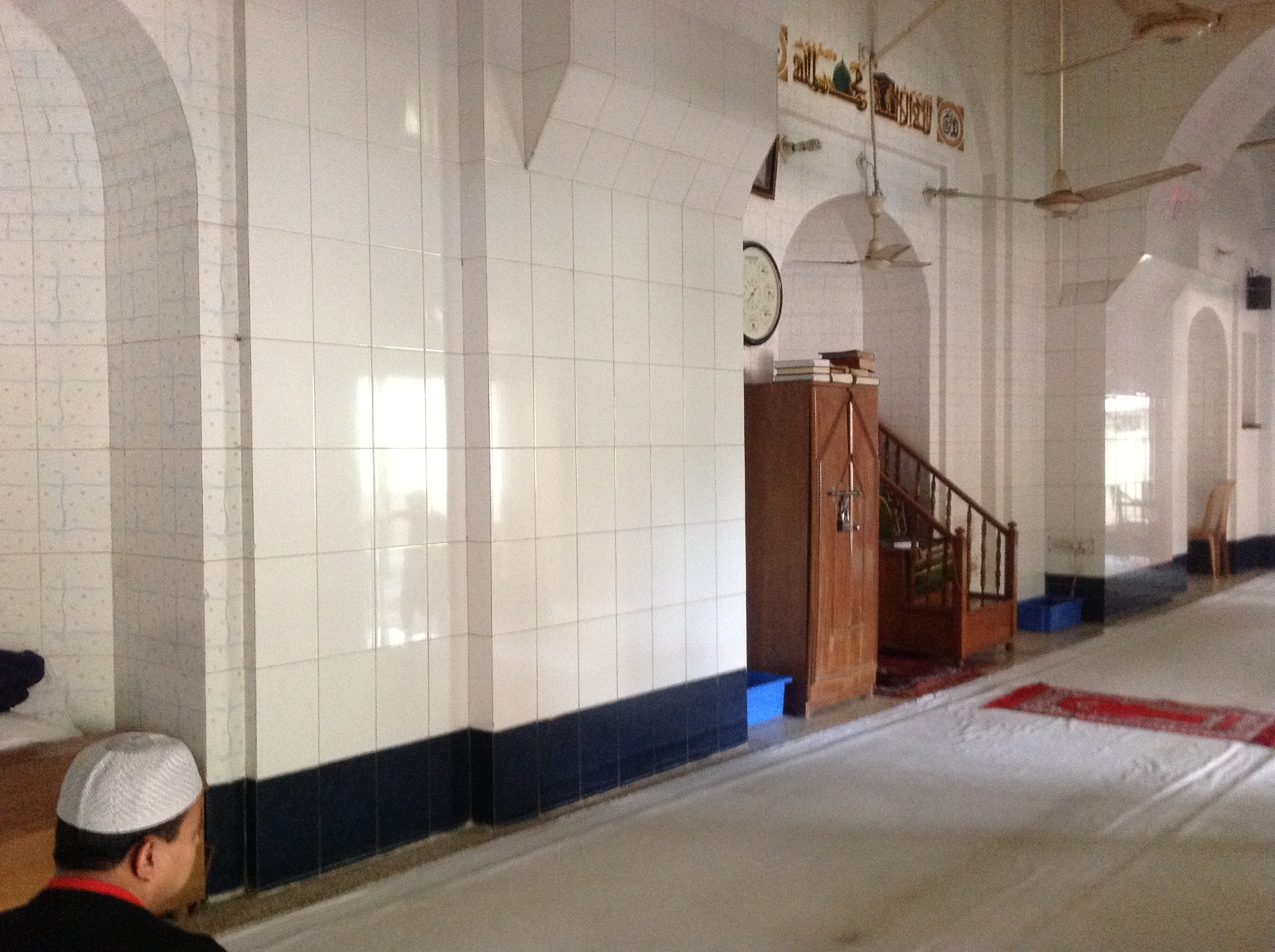
The three mihrabs at the western facade

The mosque was initially built as a highly tall single-storied mosque with a great emphasis on vertical qualities. Three mihrabs are located in the western wall from the base of the ground floor to one-third the height of the first floor. These mihrabs have been compressed in width and shortened in height; otherwise, they would structurally relate to the three domes to portray one of the site's prime architectural essences. The authentic mihrabs' remains are on the first floor and rise as much as one-third of their height in the western wall. In 2001, the first floor was inserted directly into the mosque, jeopardising the structural beauty of the relationship between the domes and the mihrabs. After the construction of the first floor, the beauty of the domes and mihrabs remains undecipherable, where the roof of the first floor completely obstructs the former's view, and the latter's size has been dramatically altered. A combination of embellishments and proportional adjustment among elements such as arches, domes, mihrabs etc., defines the architecture of the Bibi Maryam Mosque.

All of these have been used in a series of three members. In such elements, the middle one is much larger and more emphasised than those flanking it. For instance, the three domes roofed the interior space where the central dome is much larger than the subsidiary ones on either side. Using three domes in such a manner for a mosque is a distinctive feature of the Mughal style. There is a minaret situated at the eastern corner of the main building. It was built during the 1971 Liberation War and has lost its original features due to later repairs, which modernised it. The interior hall has simple lateral arches, but the side domes have been reduced by adjusting the side walls' thickness. The three domes are embellished with basal leaf imitations, and the walls are fortified. The embellishment of the outer surfaces or walls, which in the contemporary typical Mughal mosques were plaques and floral and geometric motifs, is also untraceable. A veranda has been added alongside the first floor due to the eastern facade of the mosque to accommodate more worshipers, which has marred the mosque's beauty. Initially, an open plaza adjoined the east face, adding to its beauty and measuring 50 feet by 20 feet. Even though rectangular, the mosque looks more like a square due to its 50 feet width being marginally more extensive than its 45 feet breadth.

== Relationship with the complex ==
The historical records clarify that the fortified complex existed before the masjid and the shrine it houses. This complex is entirely fortified with 4-foot-wide and 12-foot-high boundary walls. The prime building is the Bibi Maryam Shrine. The masjid faces the shrine opposite it, and its central axis is aligned with the shrines.

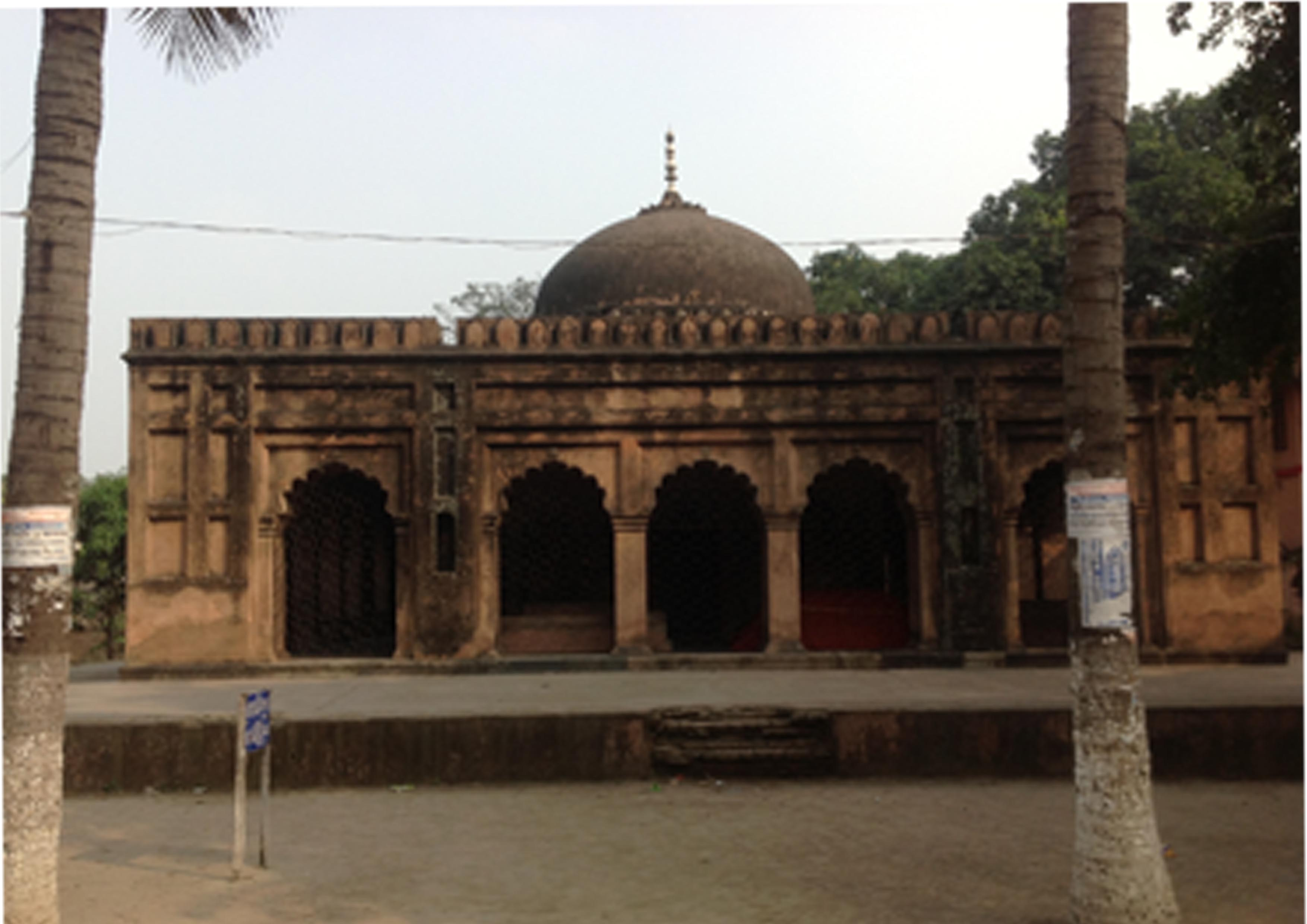
This is the shrine of Bibi Maryam

The Masjid was built simultaneously with the shrine to fulfil the need for congregational prayer and complement the shrine's significance by availing the scope for worshipers to pray for the deceased Bibi Maryam's salvation. This shrine leads to a subsidiary shrine and, located at the western end of the Masjid, is a secret passage by which Nawab Shaista Khan's soldiers could access the Hajiganj Fort. The rectangle-shaped Bibi Maryam shrine is accessible from all directions with five arches on all its facades and is topped by a dome. Unlike the Bibi Maryam Masjid, the shrine has retained all its architectural qualities despite undergoing conservation numerous times.

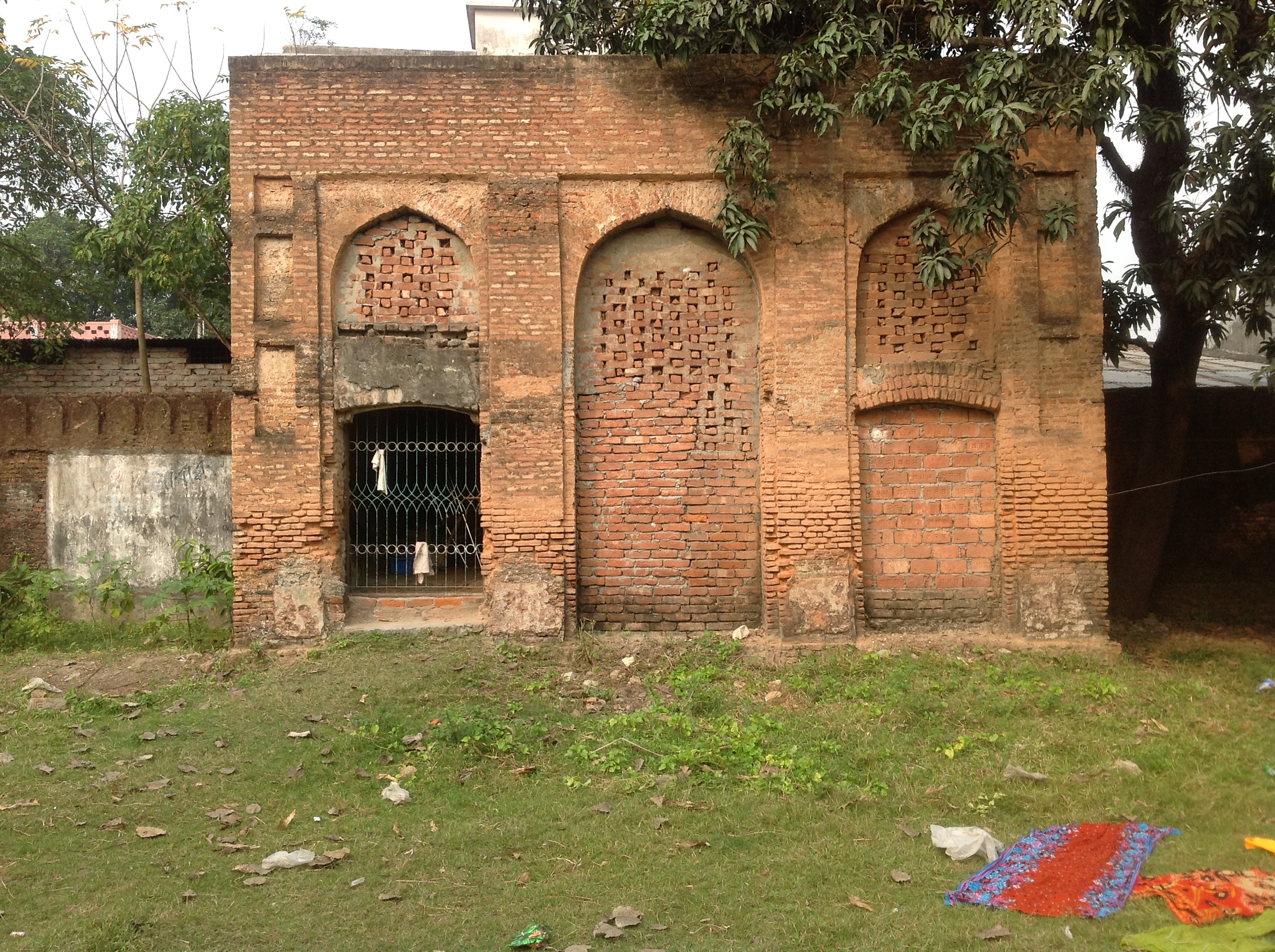
This unit was used as the dwelling of the guards

It reflects the age during which it was built. After the 1971 Liberation War, Bibi Maryam Girls Primary School consumed a substantial area of the Bibi Maryam complex, for which a large part of the eastern and southern fortifications had to be demolished. The shrines and the masjid are located on elevated surfaces. Another building adjoined the fortified walls in the south direction, which was the dwelling of Nawab's soldiers who guarded the complex. The main shrine is a monochromatic structure plastered with light-brown surfaces and adorned with recessed rectangular panels. The parapet of the shrine is decorated in the same style as the top of the fortified boundary walls. It is presented with three arches in the middle flanked at the right and left sides by a single arch of identical size and features. The shrine has been built on an elevated platform which measures three feet high and is accessed by an open staircase whose appearance is ruined.

== Mughal embellishments of the Masjid ==
Although the plaques and motifs which adorned the Bibi Maryam Masjid disappeared long ago, their themes can still be deduced by analysing those still preserved in the shrine and other buildings of the complex. Some embellishments were produced as patterns of voids and minute angular shapes by piercing the walls directly. The other elements are projected or recessed rectangular plaques and floral and geometric motifs. The latter types also enhance the incident natural lighting in buildings for comfort and aesthetics. This strategy has been commonly employed in Islamic architecture and is strongly featured in the shrine and subsidiary shrine.

Unlike the shrine, it has transformed radically under the different conservation and construction phases. The Masjid stands wholly deprived of its true architectural significance. Several books have been written to unravel its wonders, albeit with limited hypothetical conclusions, and are oriented more towards the sensitivity of its values. The scarcity of the information is attributed to its faint documentation in the context of history and the government's irresponsibility in treating it as a national heritage. However, it is not dilapidated since a lot can be traced from the surviving elements, such as domes, arches and load-bearing walls that defined the space in its inception.

== Bibliography ==
- Zakaria, A.K.M (2004). Bangladesher Prachin Kirti. Dhaka: University Press Limited. (pp. 161–162).
- Bangladesh Asiatec Society (2007). Banglapedia. Dhaka: Bangladesh Jatiyo Gyankosh. (pp . 241–242).
- Mamoon. M (2008) Dhaka Sritir Bisritir Nagari. Ananya. (pp. 180).
