= Azimpur Mosque =

Mosque in Dhaka, Bangladesh

- আজিমপুর মসজিদ
- Location within Bangladesh

Religion
- Affiliation: Islam

Location
- Location: Dhaka, Bangladesh
- Interactive map of Azimpur Mosque
- Coordinates: 23°43′37.9″N 90°22′53.5″E

Architecture
- Style: Mughal
- Established: 1746; 280 years ago
- Dome: 1

Azimpur Mosque (Bengali: আজিমপুর মসজিদ) is located beside the Azimpur graveyard in Dhaka. A Persian inscription in the mosque indicates that the mosque was built in 1746 AD by Fayzul Alam. The mosque was built during the reign of Mughal Nawab Alivardi Khan and is the last existing example of a mosque structure with a single dome and a flanking half-domed vault on both sides.

== Architecture ==
Azimpur Mosque has the same architectural plan as the nearby Khan Muhammad Mridha Mosque.

The mosque is single domes and a two-storied structure. Some experts say that the dome bears Ottoman Empire architecture.

Five arched doorways are there and each of the doors has a half domed vault consisting of two arches over them. The mosque is unique in Bangladesh as it is the last structure to exist that has a single dome with half domed sides on the roof.

== Renovation ==
In January 2017, the mosque has been partially demolished to make the structure modern and increase space for prayer. With the intervention of the Department of Archaeology of Bangladesh, the demolition was halted. But a significant portion of the historical mosque was damaged.

== See also ==
- Islam in Bangladesh
- List of mosques in Bangladesh
