= Katabon Mosque =

Mosque in Dhaka, Bangladesh

- কাটাবন মসজিদ
- Location within Bangladesh

Religion
- Affiliation: Sunni Islam

Location
- Location: Shahbag, Dhaka, Bangladesh
- Interactive map of Katabon Mosque
- Coordinates: 23°44′18.2″N 90°23′28.6″E

Architecture
- Type: Mosque

Katabon Mosque (Bengali: কাটাবন মসজিদ) in Shahbag, Dhaka is a center for Muslim missionaries in Bangladesh. It houses the Bangladesh Masjid Mission (Bangladesh Mosque Mission) and is officially named as the "Bangladesh Masjid Mission Complex Central Mosque". It is adjacent to where the stables of the Dhaka Nawab Family used to be.

The mosque houses the Islamic Economics Research Bureau, which works to "synergize the intellectual capabilities of the modern day professionals, academicians, and students of Islamic banking and finance". The Bangladesh Masjid Mission advocate a more orthodox form of Islam in Bangladesh.

== See also ==
- Islam in Bangladesh
- List of mosques in Bangladesh
