= Allakuri Mosque =

Mosque in Dhaka, Bangladesh

Allakuri Mosque আল্লাকুরি মসজিদ

Religion
- Affiliation: Islam

Location
- Location: Dhaka, Bangladesh

Architecture
- Style: Mughal
- Established: 1680; 346 years ago

Specifications
- Dome: 1
- Minaret: 4

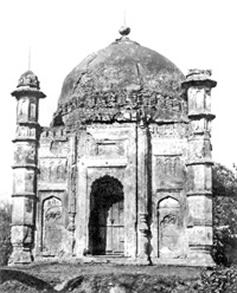

Allakuri Mosque (Bengali: আল্লাকুরি মসজিদ), located in the Mohammadpur Colony area near Sat Masjid Road of Dhaka, is an example of the imperial Mughal architecture in Bangladesh. The mosque was tentatively built in 1680 and is the earliest known square single-domed Mughal style mosque in Bengal.

== Architecture ==
The mosque has a square dimension with an internal measurement of 3.81 meter*3.81 meters.

It has four octagonal corner towers (minarets). The towers have kalasa vases at their base, are divided into sections by raised bands at regular intervals and are crowned by a kiosk and parapet.

The mosque can be entered through three doorways each in the center of each wall except for the west sided wall(Qibla side). The west sided wall has three semi-octagonal arched mihrabs. The walls of the mosque are thick and that keeps the interior cool in summer.

The square prayer hall is roofed over with a single dome. The dome is carried on a squinch or octagonal drum. The dome seems to have a Persian architectural influence. The dome was previously crowned with a lotus and kalasa finial.

There was a stone inscription on top of the east-sided entrance of the mosque. It is told that the inscription was taken away by the king of Bhawal in the last century.

== Renovation and changes ==
The lotus on the top of the dome was removed during a renovation. Also, the three mihrabs on the west-sided wall were constructed.

In recent times, the mosque was extended on the east, north, and south side with tin sheds without breaking the original structures. As a result, the whole structure cannot be seen from the outside now but the top of the mosque can be seen. The inner and outside of the mosque was painted newly during renovation.

== Protection ==
As the mosque has archaeological and architectural significance, the mosque needs to be protected by the archaeological department of the government to save it from decay.

== See also ==
- Islam in Bangladesh
- List of mosques in Bangladesh
