= Qassabtuly Mosque =

Mosque in Dhaka, Bangladesh

Coordinates: 23.716094°N 90.405°E

- কাস্বাবটুলি মসজিদ
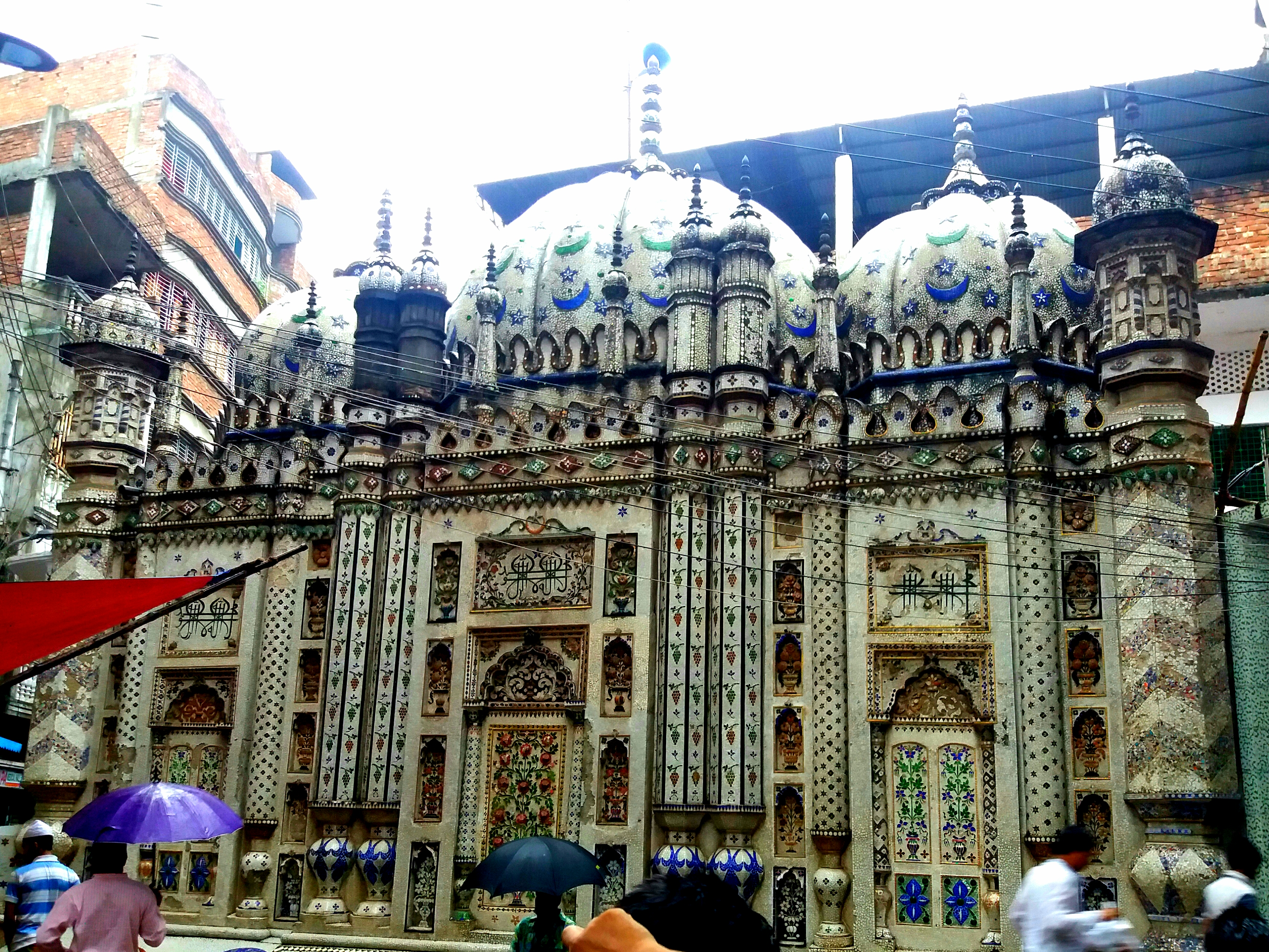

- Location in Bangladesh

Religion
- Affiliation: Islam
- Branch/tradition: Sunni
- Status: Active

Location
- Location: PK Ghosh Road, Koshaituli, Old Dhaka, Bangladesh
- Interactive map of Qassabtuly Mosque

Architecture
- Architects: Abdul Bari, Qamruddin Sardar
- Type: Mosque
- Style: Mughal architecture
- Completed: 1919

The Qassabtuly Mosque is one of the most ornate mosques in Old Dhaka, Bangladesh. Its gloriously inscribed decorations are delicate and one of a kind.

The foundation of the Qassabtuly Jam-e-Masjid (Hijri 1338), laid by Abdul Bari Bepari and others and situated in old town Dhaka in Bangladesh, was built in the year of 1919. It has recently acquired the name "Koshaituly Jam-e-Masjid" referring to "koshais" (butchers) who used to dwell at the old town.

== Preview ==
The mosque was built by Qamruddin Sardar.

The construction of the mosque stretched to the year of 1945 and was renovated in the year of 1971. The building of this mosque had a remarkable impact on the Muslims of Bengal, as it introduced pre-mughal art and architecture when it was established in the year 1919.

== Architectural style ==
This three-flute-domed mosque is studded with pieces of ceramic or chini-tikri. The high-plinth design of the building followed by the design of the three domes, with the bigger dome in the middle and the smaller ones on either sides, was typical Mughal architecture. This exquisitely colorful-mosque has a surrounding balcony on the north-side of the building.

The west facade of the building stands adjacent to two high towers, accompanied by turrets and domes. The west side or the Qibla (The direction Muslims face when they offer prayer) of the mosque is a hollow concave wall, with a spherical onion shaped dome on the top, and decorated with fine floral motifs and floral vases.

Colorful floral decorations are studded on the doors to the main chamber along with multifoiled arches. The main chamber of the mosque accommodates 120 people while the outer hall can offer space to 1,000 people praying at a time. The use of glazed tile wasn't introduced to the local Hindus up until the ornate decoration of this mosque was showcased.

== History ==
The locals in the 1919 (during the foundation of this mosque) were thought to be the followers of Maulana Keramat. The local women were said to be embroidery experts Beautiful floral motifs, star-shaped inscriptions and the geometric designs around the inner halls mask the architecture of the Mughals while avoidance of animals and humans motifs show the strength of the Islamic taste in art.

The interiors of this mosque contains flower vases, floral motifs and Arabic Calligraphy. The artistic designs and fine decorative skills portray the influence of Persian origin and therefore presents evidence to the Dominance of Islam in this region.

== See also ==
- Islam in Bangladesh
- List of mosques in Bangladesh
