= Zebun Nessa Mosque =

Mosque in Dhaka, Bangladesh

- জেবুন নেসা মসজিদ
- Location within Dhaka Location within Dhaka division Location within Bangladesh

Religion
- Affiliation: Islam
- District: Ashulia, Dhaka District
- Ownership: Mohd Idris Shakur
- Year consecrated: 2022
- Status: Active

Location
- Country: Bangladesh
- Administration: Ministry of Religious Affairs
- Coordinates: 23°54′01″N 90°19′38″E

Architecture
- Architect: Saiqa Iqbal Meghna
- Type: Neo-islamic
- Style: Islamic Architecture
- Funded by: Mohd Idris Shakur
- General contractor: Studio Morphogenesis Ltd.
- Groundbreaking: 2019
- Completed: 2023

Specifications
- Capacity: 6500+
- Dome: 01
- Site area: 6060 square feet

The Zebun Nessa Mosque (Bengali: জেবুন নেসা মসজিদ) is an urban mosque which is located in Ashulia on the outskirts of Dhaka, Bangladesh. The mosque is an architectural project designed by Studio Morphogenesis under the direction of Saiqa Iqbal Meghna. Completed in 2023, the mosque which covers an area of 6060 square feet was commissioned by a local textile factory owner Mohd Idris Shakur to honor his late mother.

== History ==
The mosque was commissioned by the land owner Mohd Idris Shakur, managing director of IDS Group, to honor his dead mother, Zebun Nessa, and provide a mosque for the workers of Fashion Forum Limited, a nearby industrial complex under his ownership. Its construction work was formally started in 2022. The mosque was designed by Studio Morphogenesis under the leadership of Saiqa Iqbal Meghna, with the construction ending in 2023.

== Architecture ==
The mosque was designed in a pink concrete in order to soften the harsh industrial surroundings along with reflecting the traditional terracotta tones of Bengal's Mughal architecture. On the exterior, red cement and broken bricks are organized to form mosaic-style flooring and sloping surface. The mosque which is situated at the bank of a lake is elevated on a high plinth, inspired by vernacular structures built on mounds to protect against flooding. It is a square base surrounding a circular prayer hall. Four enclosed gardens serve as light courts that enhance natural illumination and ventilation. There is a huge thin shell dome in the middle of the quadrangular structure of the mosque.

== Features ==
Unlike conventional mosques, the qibla wall features a wide arched opening that frames views of an adjacent waterbody. A translucent glass mihrab refracts light over a shallow waterbody within the mosque. A crescent-shaped mezzanine floor provides a prayer space for women, accessible via a sculptural spiral staircase wrapped around a Chhatim tree. The ablution space features turquoise mosaic flooring and uses recycled water for landscaping, creating a closed-loop system.

== Recognition ==
Zebun Nessa Mosque was listed as one of the World's Greatest Places of 2025 by Time Magazine for its architectural beauty. With this, the mosque became the first Bangladeshi architecture to earn a place in the Time's World's Greatest Places.
