= Jadabpur Union =

Jadabpur Union যাদবপুর ইউনিয়ন
- Location of Jadabpur Union in Bangladesh
- Coordinates: 24.210502°N 90.149240°E
- Country: Bangladesh
- Division: Dhaka Division
- District: Tangail District
- Upazila: Sakhipur Upazila
- Established: 1984

Government
  - Type: Union Council
  - Chairman: AKM Atiqur Rahman (Bangladesh Awami League)

Area
  - Total: 46.16 km^{2} (17.82 sq mi)
- Elevation: 14 m (46 ft)

Population (2011)
  - Total: 59,092
  - Density: 1,280/km^{2} (3,316/sq mi)
- Time zone: UTC+6 (BST)
- Postal code: 1950
- Website: jadabpurup.tangail.gov.bd

Jadabpur Union (Bengali: যাদবপুর ইউনিয়ন) is a union of Sakhipur Upazila, Tangail District, Bangladesh. It is situated 29 kilometres (18 mi) east of Tangail, the district headquarters.

== Demographics ==
According to the 2011 Bangladesh census, Jadabpur Union had 15,002 households and a population of 59,092. The literacy rate (age 7 and over) was 40.4% (male: 44.1%, female: 37%).

== See also ==
- Union Councils of Tangail District
