= Baitur Rauf Mosque =

Mosque in Dhaka, Bangladesh

Bait Ur Rouf Mosque
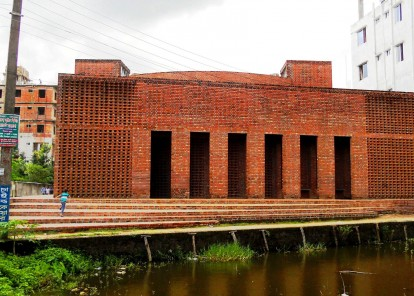

- Location within Bangladesh

Religion
- Affiliation: Islam

Location
- Location: Faidabad, Dhaka, Bangladesh
- Municipality: Dhaka
- Interactive map of Bait Ur Rouf Mosque
- Coordinates: 23.8810°N 90.4146°E

Architecture
- Architect: Marina Tabassum
- Type: Mosque
- Completed: 2012
- Construction cost: USD 150000

Specifications
- Capacity: 400 person
- Dome: no dome

The Bait Ur Rouf Mosque (Bengali: বায়তুর রউফ জামে মসজিদ, Arabic: الجامع بيت الرؤوف) is a distinctive urban mosque located in Dhaka, Bangladesh. Designed by Bangladeshi architect Marina Tabassum and completed in 2012, it has been called a refuge of spirituality in urban Dhaka and received recognition for its beautiful use of natural light and for challenging the status quo of traditional mosque design. Instead of traditional symbolism such as domes and minarets, the mosque relies on open space and the rich interplay of light and shadow to create a prayer space that elevates the spirit.

== History ==
In the wake of the tragic loss of two of her daughters, Bangladeshi widow Sufia Khatun donated part of her land for the construction of a mosque. In 2005, she commissioned her granddaughter, architect Marina Tabassum, to design it. Community members initially used a temporary structure on the site for prayer, but when Khatun died, Tabassum was left as the sole fundraiser, designer, client, and builder of the project. Community donors provided most of the funding for the building.

== Architecture ==
The mosque was designed by Marina Tabassum, a female architect from Bangladesh. Known for designing the Museum of Independence in Dhaka, she is recognized as one of the country's top architects and one of only a few women architects in the country. In Bangladesh, it is unusual for a female to design a mosque – Bangladeshi women rarely even enter a mosque, praying instead at home, since few mosques have dedicated sections for women. Tabassum visited more than 100 mosques before designing Bait Ur Rouf Mosque, despite having hardly ever entered a mosque previously.

Bangladesh's rich mosque-building history dates back to the 13th century's Turkish invasion. The earliest mosques incorporated elements from local building traditions, such as small domes that span the roof and brick walls. The architect combined this unique traditional Sultanate mosque architecture with a modern approach to create a design that challenges the status quo.

The building is located in a flood-prone area, and is designed along an axis angled 13 degrees to the Qibla direction. To compensate for this angle, the building is raised on a plinth with a cylinder inside of a square. This allowed the designer to rotate the prayer hall to the correct direction and created light courts on four sides with room for other functions.

The mosque's prayer hall has no columns inside, instead relying on eight peripheral columns for support. Dozens of random, circular openings in the ceiling and walls allow natural light to enter the building, creating shifting patterns of light and shadow to enhance the spiritual atmosphere.

The small-footprint, one-storey building has no domes, minarets, or decorative panels, and fits in with its surroundings. Handmade terracotta brick walls provide natural ventilation, helping keep the building cool even on hot days. Without using the usual mosque symbolism, the architect created a space of spirituality with simplicity and the use of natural light prompting deep reflection and contemplation in prayer.

The building cost Sh 15 million and took five years to construct. Construction finished in 2012.

== National attention ==
Although locals funded and use the building, visitors from across Bangladesh, including Chittagong and Sylhet, visit the Mosque. This includes devotees and architecture students.

The architect purposely reduced symbolism in her design to encourage the building's use for other social activities beyond prayer. Children are encouraged to play in the building, which is unusual for a mosque. The architect aimed to make the building a place of tranquility in one of the poorest neighbourhoods of one of the most crowded cities in the world, with "Breathing spaces" in and around the building providing a place for worshippers to socialize outside of prayer times. Throughout the day, children play and elderly men chat on the building's plinth.

The Bait Ur Rouf Mosque is unusual not only for being only one of two mosques in Bangladesh built by a woman but also for its environmentally-friendly design. The architecture pays tribute to lost mosque-building traditions and fits into the landscape of a country with a developing economy, which the architect believed was her social responsibility.

== Awards and recognition ==
The Bait Ur Rouf Mosque was one of six winners of the Aga Khan Award for Architecture in 2016, along with the Friendship Centre in Gaibandha. This $1 million award, presented by the Aga Khan Trust for Culture, recognizes architectural excellence in Muslim communities around the world. The award jury chose the mosque for pushing the boundaries of how a religious space should look and creating a design that elevates the spirit.

In 2018, the mosque was awarded the Jameel Prize from the Victoria and Albert Museum.

== Gallery ==
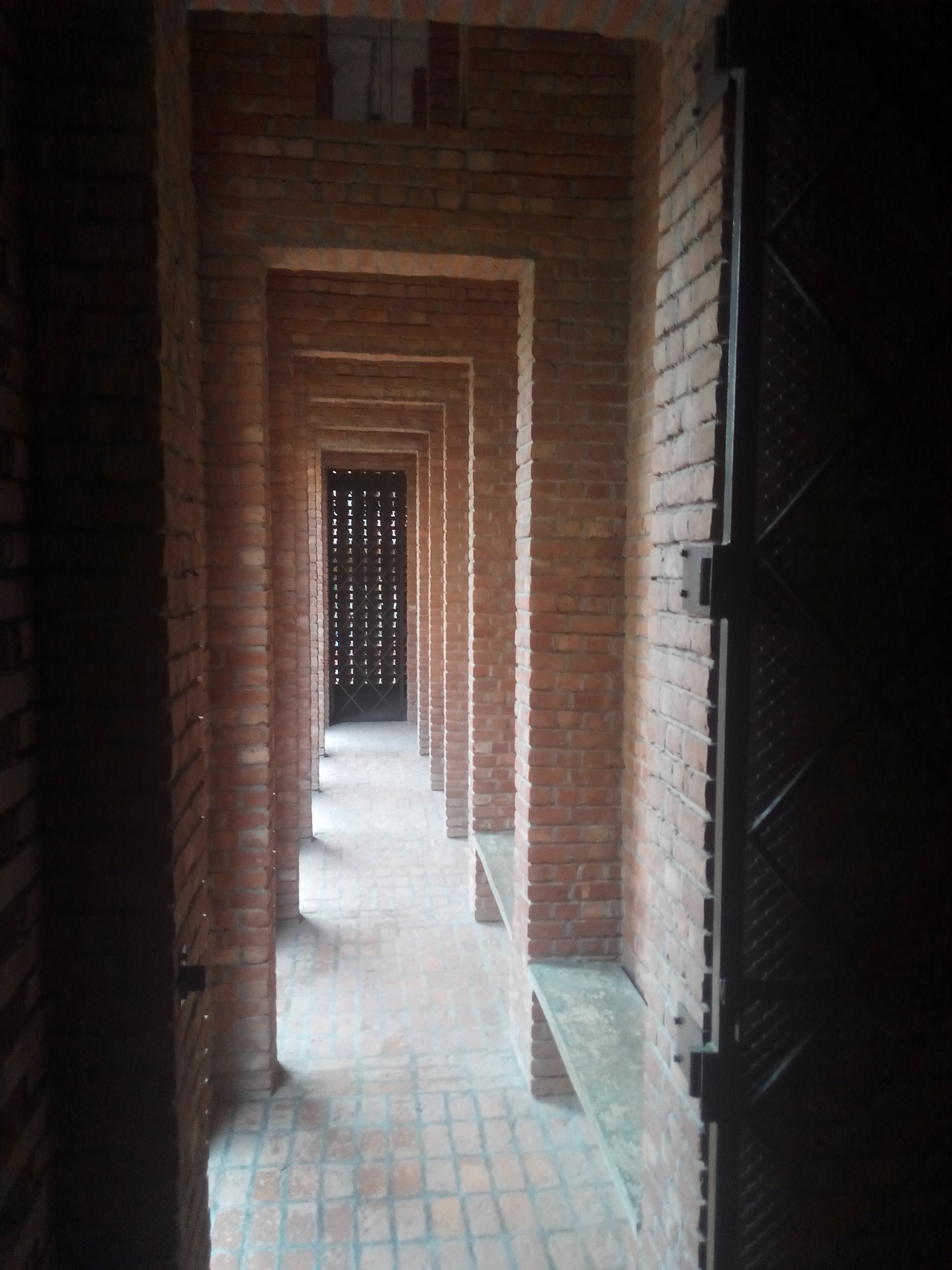

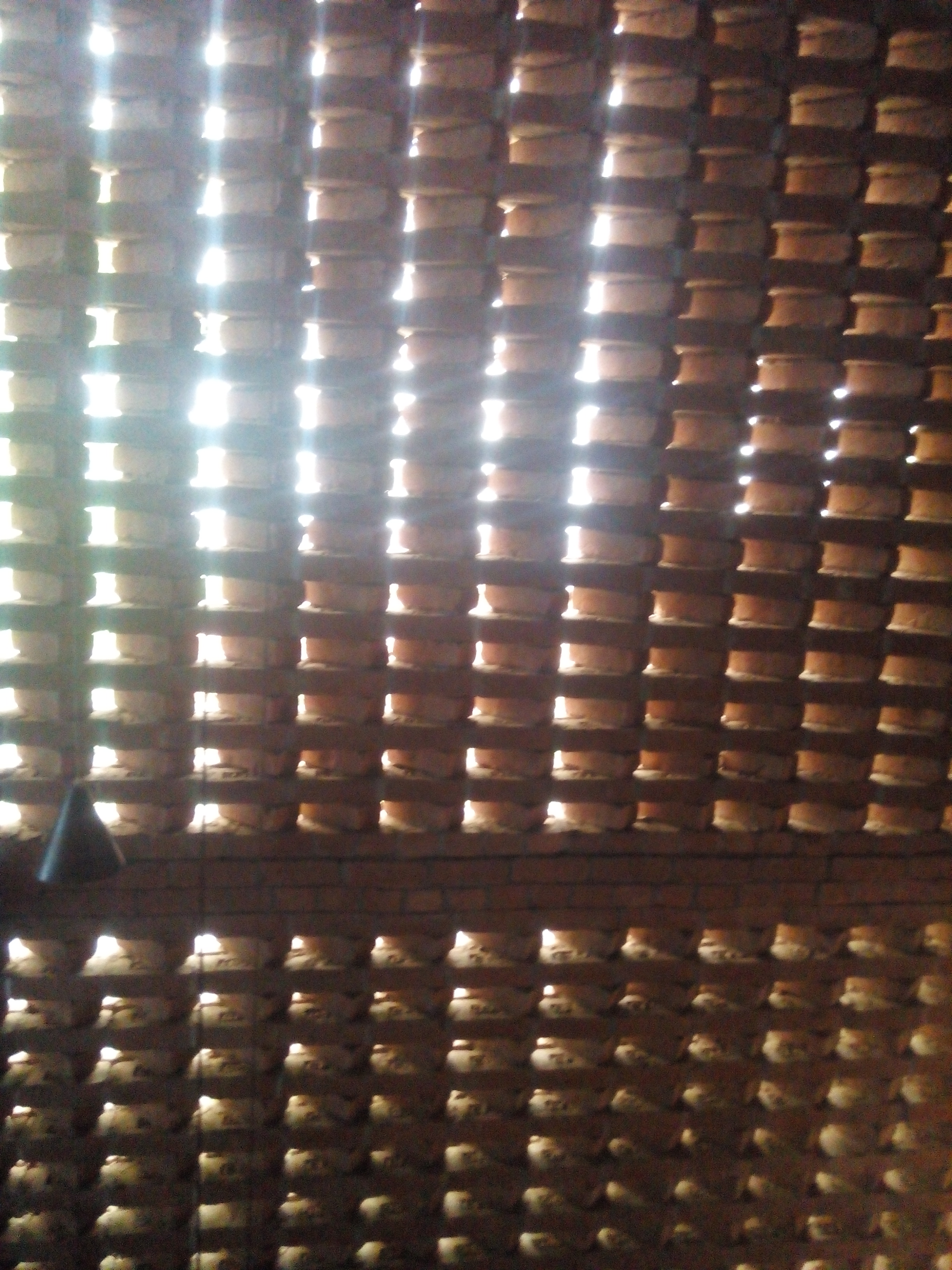

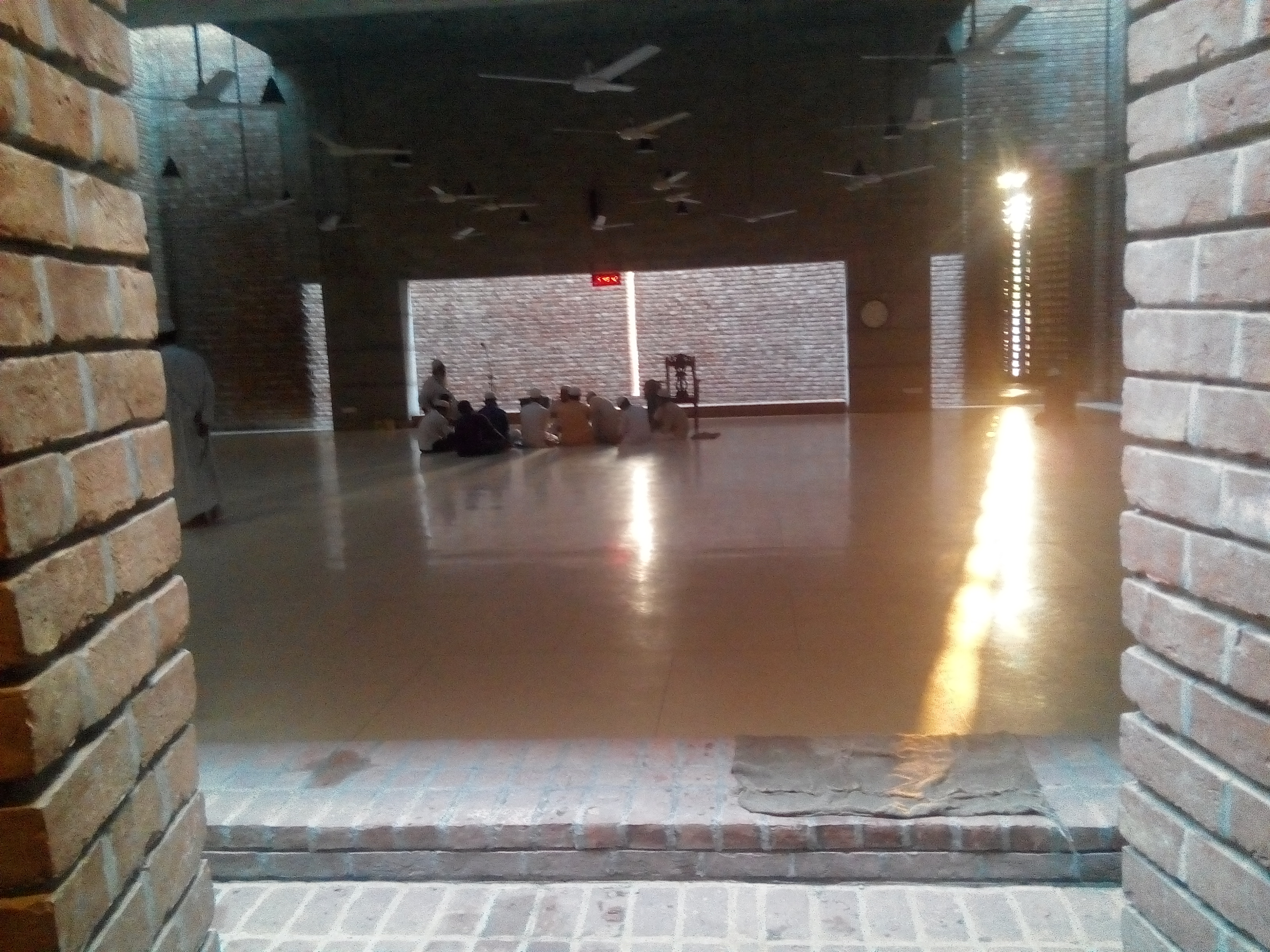

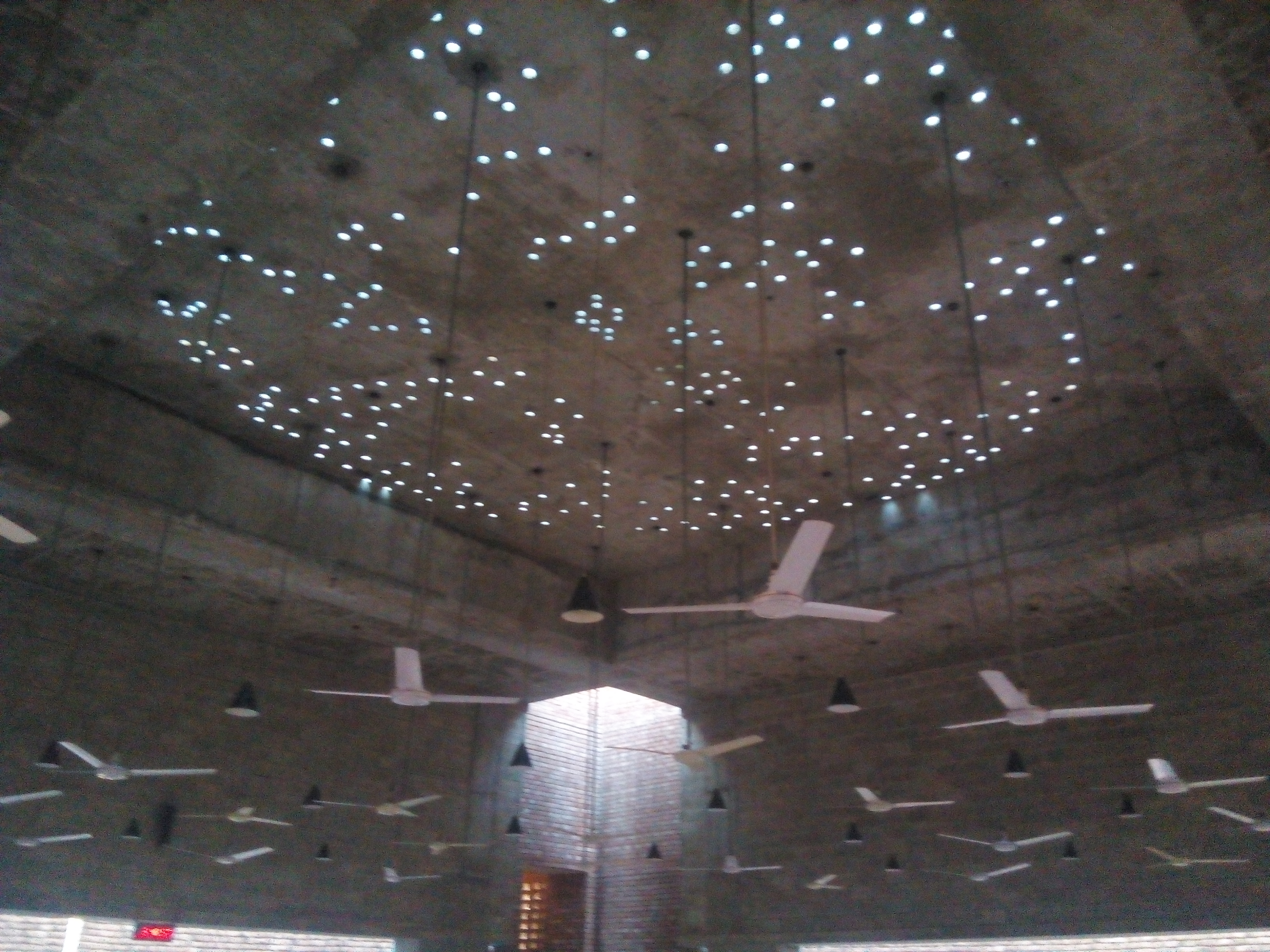

== See also ==
- Islam in Bangladesh
- List of mosques in Bangladesh
