= Suhrawardy Udyan =

National memorial in Dhaka, Bangladesh

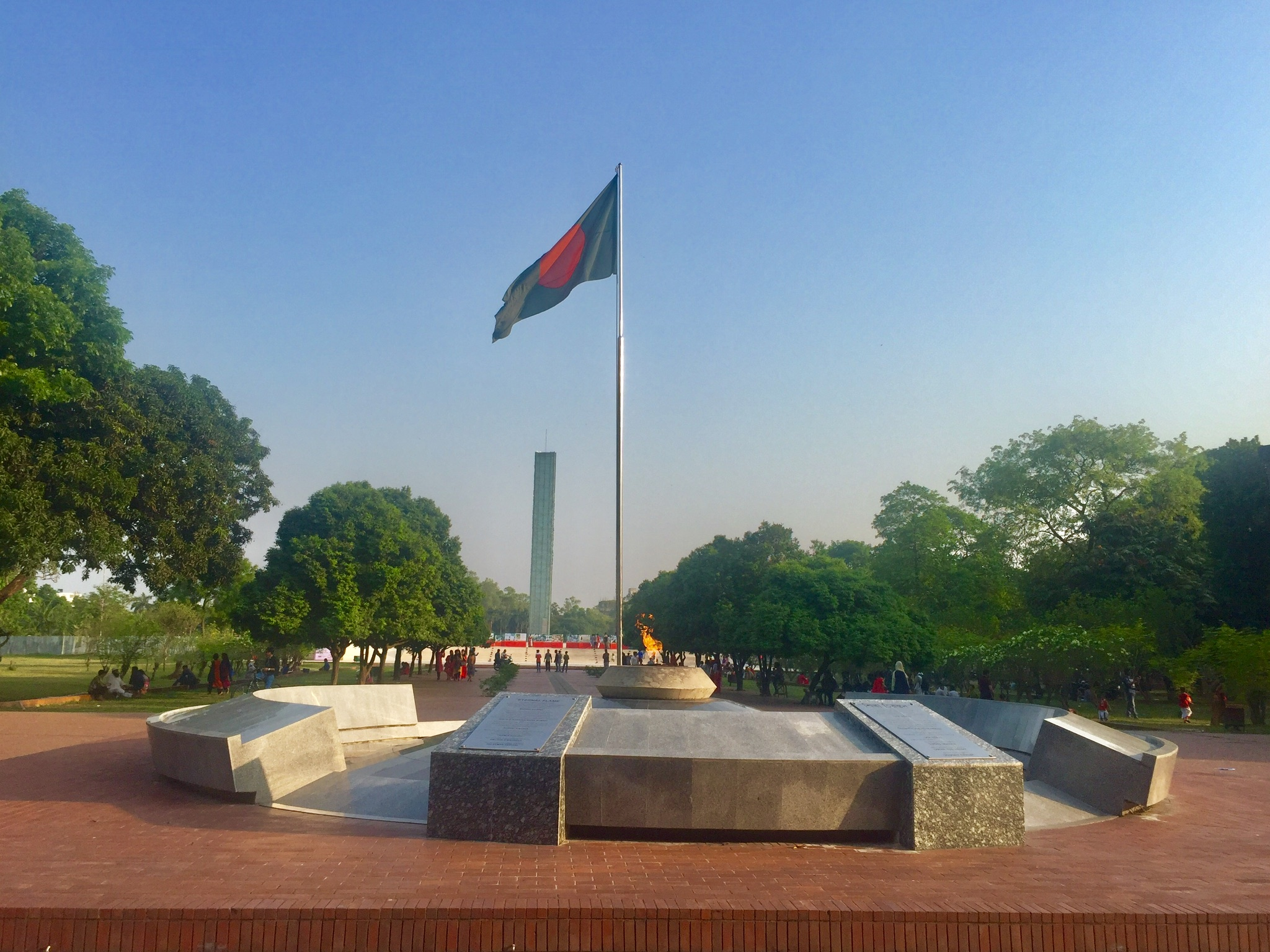
- Eternal Flame: a monument marks the spot in Suhrawardy Udyan, where Sheikh Mujibur Rahman delivered his 7th March Speech in 1971
- Interactive map of Suhrawardy Udyan
- Type: National memorial
- Location: Shahbagh, Dhaka, Bangladesh
- Coordinates: 23.7331°N 90.3984°E
- Area: 68 acres (0.28 km^{2})
- Status: Open all year

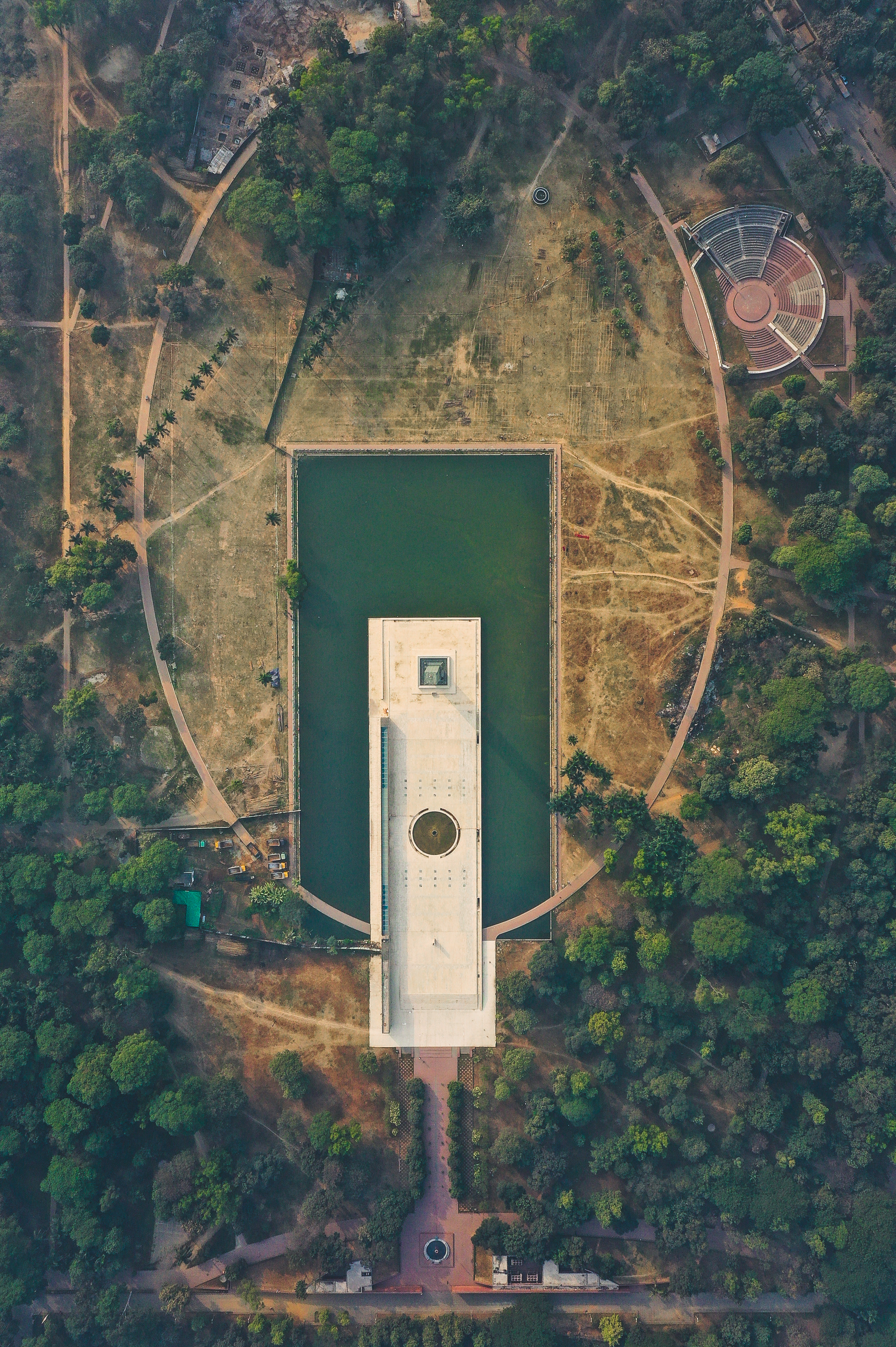
Suhrawardy Udyan

Suhrawardy Udyan (Bengali: সোহরাওয়ার্দী উদ্যান, romanized: Sōhrāōẏārdī Udyān, lit. 'Suhrawardy Park') is a national memorial and public space located in Dhaka, Bangladesh. Originally known as Ramna Race Course, it holds historical importance due to its association with key events in the country's history.

The site, covering an area of 95 acres (0.38 km^{2}), is notably associated with two pivotal moments in Bangladeshi history: the historic speech by Sheikh Mujibur Rahman on 7 March 1971 calling for struggle against the Pakistani establishment and the surrender of the Pakistani forces on 16 December 1971, which marked the end of the Bangladesh War of Independence. In recognition of its historical significance, the area was renamed Suhrawardy Udyan in honour of Huseyn Shaheed Suhrawardy, the 5th Prime Minister of Pakistan and a key figure in the early political history of East Pakistan (later Bangladesh). The space contains monuments and structures dedicated to the events of Bangladesh's liberation. Additionally, Suhrawardy Udyan hosts the annual Ekushey Book Fair, which is the largest book fair in the country, celebrating Bengali literature and culture.

== History ==
=== 1700s to 1950s ===
Suhrawardy Udyan was originally built during the Mughal period in the 18th century as Bagh-e-Badshahi (transl. King's Garden in Persian) in the Ramna area. During British rule, it hosted a military club for English soldiers called Ramna Gymkhana and a horse-racing track known as Ramna Racecourse. On 21 March 1948, the governor-general of Pakistan, Muhammad Ali Jinnah, delivered a speech here to a large crowd.

=== 1960s and 1970s: Liberation War events ===
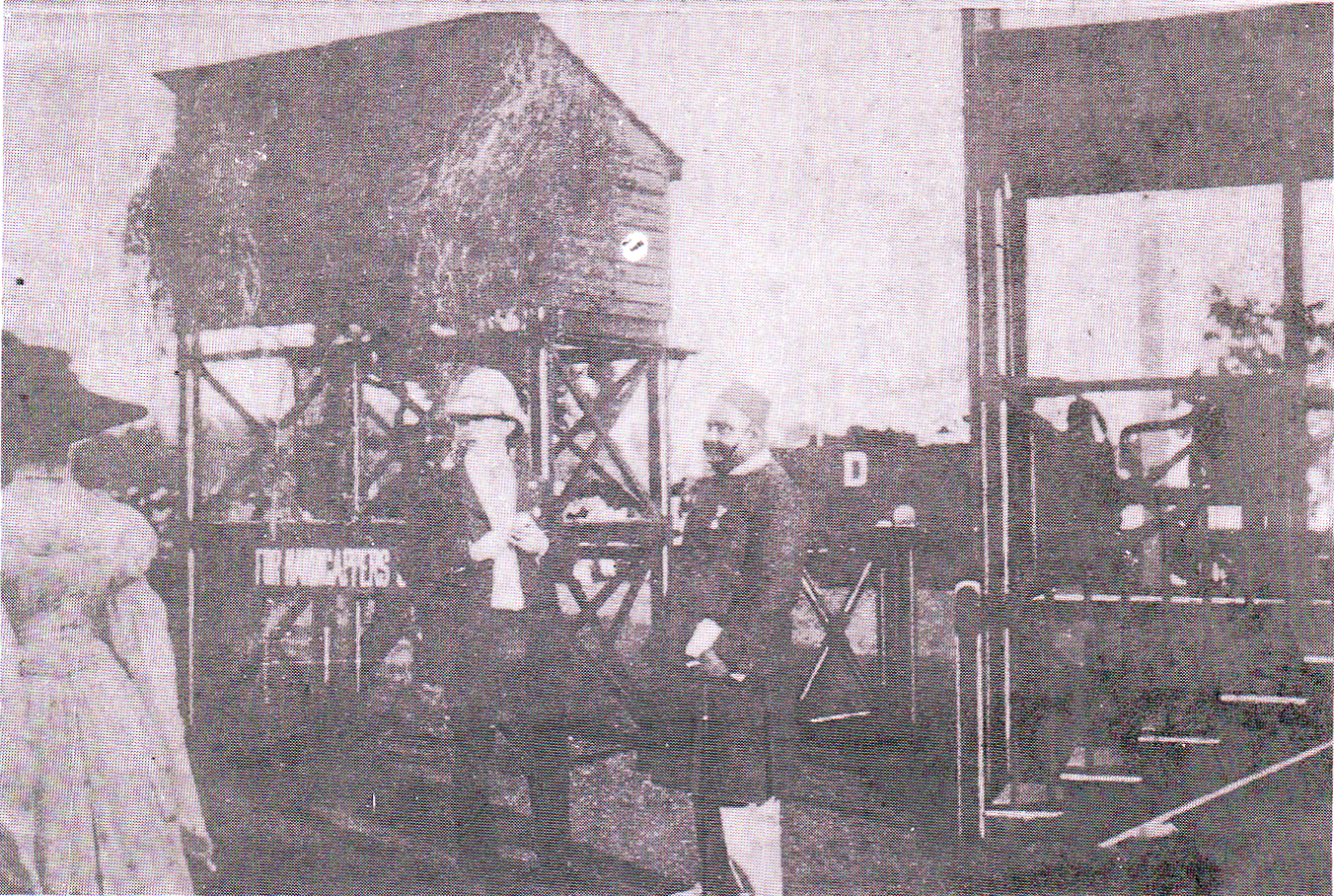
Nawab Bahadur Sir Khwaja Salimullah at Ramna Racecourse (now Suhrawardy Udyan), early 20th century

Suhrawardy Udyan was a significant venue for events related to the liberation of Bangladesh. On 23 February 1969, a civic reception was held here to honour Sheikh Mujibur Rahman upon his release from jail after sedition charges. During this event, he was bestowed with the title "Bangabandhu" (lit. 'Friend of Bengal').

On 3 January 1971, the Awami League politicians organised a massive public meeting, where they vowed not to betray the Bengali people's cause. On 7 March of the same year, Sheikh Mujibur Rahman delivered his historic speech at a large gathering. On the 27th, the Pakistani army demolished the Ramna Kali Temple, located beside the grounds, during the Ramna massacre. Eventually, they formally surrendered at this location on 16 December, now celebrated as Victory Day. After independence, the ground's name was changed to Suhrawardy Udyan in honour of politician Huseyn Shaheed Suhrawardy, a key figure in the early political history of Pakistan and Bangladesh. On 17 March 1972, a massive public meeting was jointly addressed by Indian Prime Minister Indira Gandhi and Mujibur Rahman at this site.

The original flag of Bangladesh was hoisted here for the second time after it was first unfurled at the University of Dhaka and the first time it was flown at such a large public gathering in Bangladesh.

=== 1970s to present ===
In 1975, a children's park was built on one-third of Suhrawardy Udyan's area. On 7 March 1996, an eternal flame (Shikha Chirantan) was inaugurated to commemorate the Liberation War. In July 1998, construction began on the Swadhinata Stambha (Independence Monument), to be completed in three phases.

== Landmarks and structures ==
=== Swadhinata Stambha (Independence Monument) ===
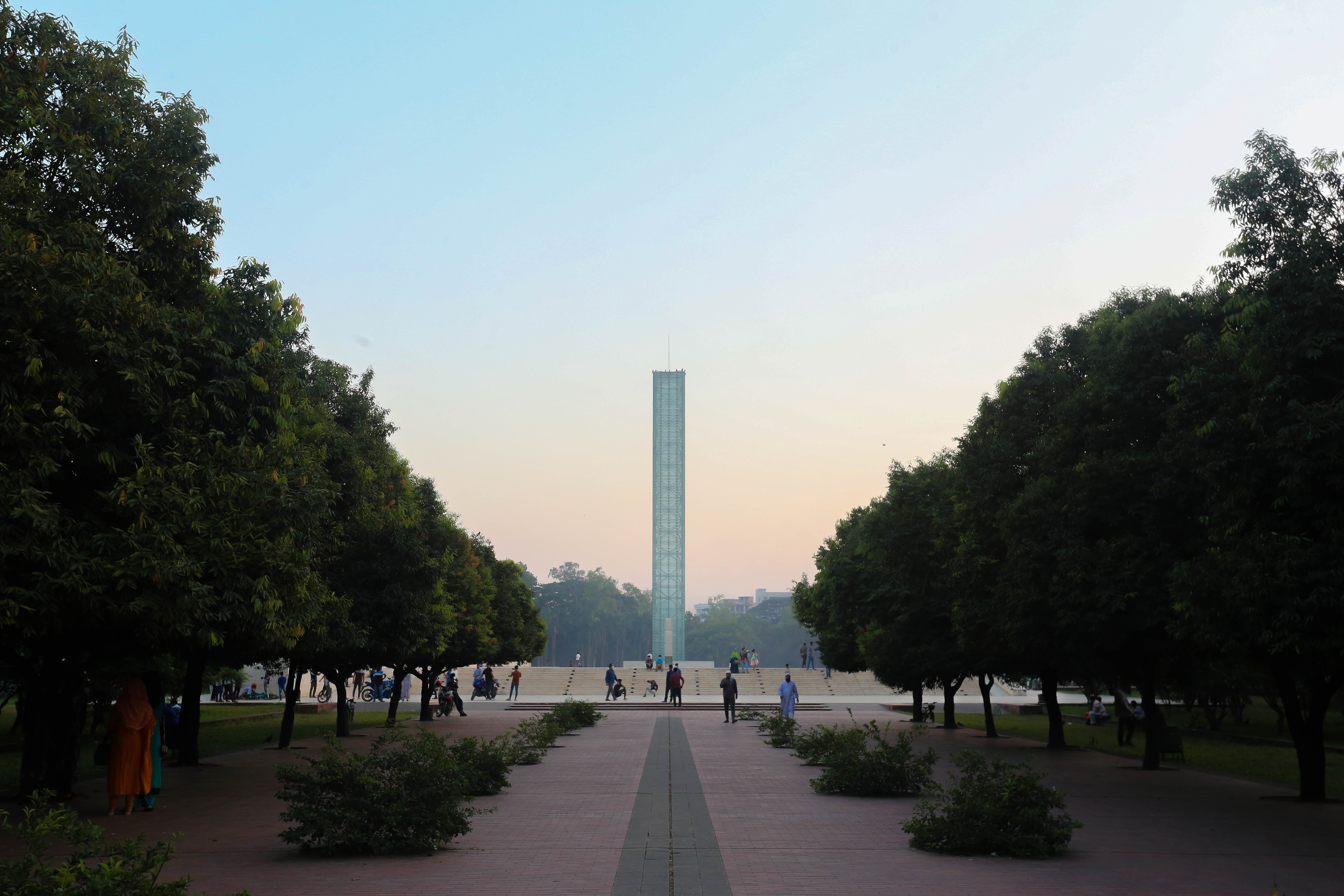
Independence Monument

The Swadhinata Stambha (Independence Monument) memorial is built on an area of 67 acres (0.27 km^{2}), designed to honour the fallen soldiers of the Independence War and includes murals depicting the history of the war and the struggle for freedom from 1948 to 1971. The main attraction is a 150-foot glass tower. Additionally, the site features an underground theatre, the Museum of Independence, an amphitheatre, a display gallery, and a decorative fountain.

=== Shikha Chirantan (Eternal Flame) ===
An eternal flame, officially called Shikha Chirantan (Bengali: শিখা চিরন্তন), was initiated in 1996 to mark the spot where Sheikh Mujibur Rahman delivered his historic 7 March speech. On the same day of 1997, Prime Minister Sheikh Hasina officially lit the flame in the presence of three world leaders: South African leader Nelson Mandela, Turkish politician Süleyman Demirel, and Palestinian leader Yasser Arafat. Annual Independence Day tributes are performed here on 26 March.

== Activities ==
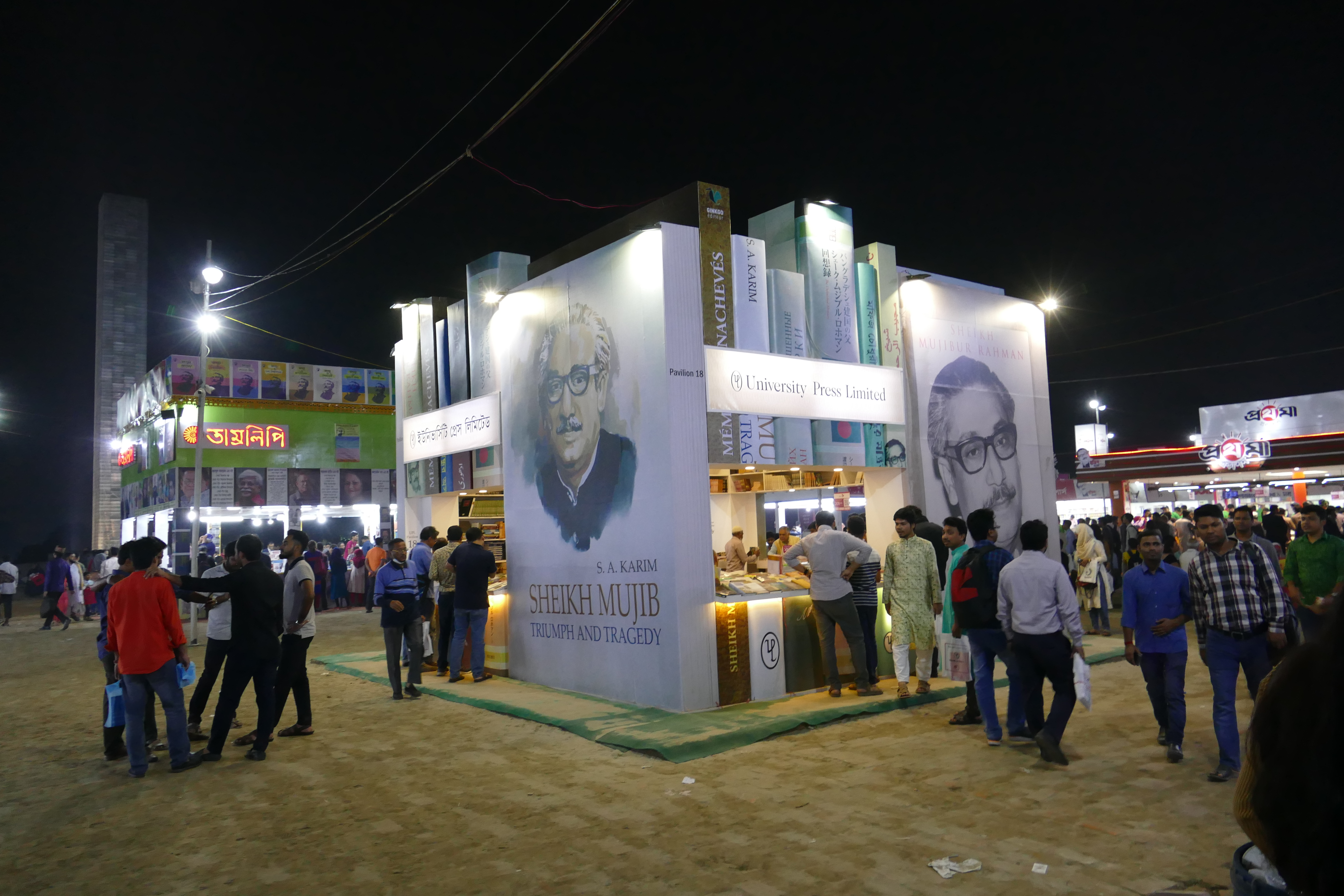
Ekushey Book Fair 2020

Since 2014, an annual month-long book fair, considered "the largest literary-cultural event of the country," has been held in Suhrawardy Udyan alongside the Bangla Academy grounds. Titled the Amor Ekushey Grontho Mela (book fair), the fair is dedicated to the protesters who died during the Bengali language movement. It began as a week-long fair on the premises of Bangla Academy in the early 1970s.

Suhrawardy Udyan hosted a fireworks display for Mujibur Rahman's 100th birth anniversary on 17 March 2020. It has also hosted events organised by Shilpakala Academy and Ganojagoron Mancha, featuring artists like Artcell, Black, Powersurge, and Joy Shahriar.

On 12 April 2025, the venue hosted a large-scale demonstration titled the March for Gaza, organized to express solidarity with the people of the Gaza Strip during the ongoing conflict. It has been described as the largest pro-Palestine protest in the country's history. Subsequently, on 3 May 2025, the Islamist group Hefazat-e-Islam Bangladesh held a grand rally at the same location. The event included demands for accountability concerning the Shapla Square massacre, the withdrawal of legal cases against the organization's leaders filed under the administration of Sheikh Hasina, and the dissolution of the Women's Affairs Reform Commission.

== Management ==
The Ministry of Liberation War Affairs owns the ground, while the Ministry of Housing and Public Works owns the 95-acre (0.38 km^{2}) park. The Public Works Department stated that it only manages the park.

== Issues ==
In 2014 and 2021, Suhrawardy Udyan has been described as an encampment of homeless people. Approximately 200 homeless people, including women and children, spend the night within the park. Reports suggested that individuals were also engaged in the transportation, sale, and consumption of drugs within Suhrawardi Udyan. In 2021, Mehedi Al Amin of The Business Standard found that the open-air theatre at the centre of the grounds, intended for concerts and public amusement programmes, was overrun by drug abusers, even in the presence of policemen, although efforts have been made previously to conduct drives against drug peddlers and addicts.

Unlawful food stalls were discovered operating inside Suhrawardy Udyan, with reports of individuals extorting money for illegal electricity connections. There were also reports of extortion under the guise of begging by transgender individuals, primarily targeting couples.

The grounds were also subjected to widespread tree felling in May 2021 as part of beautification projects, sparking extensive protests from environmentalists and the public. The High Court intervened, issuing an order to halt the activities.

== See also ==
- Ramna Park
