= Marina Tabassum =

Bangladeshi architect

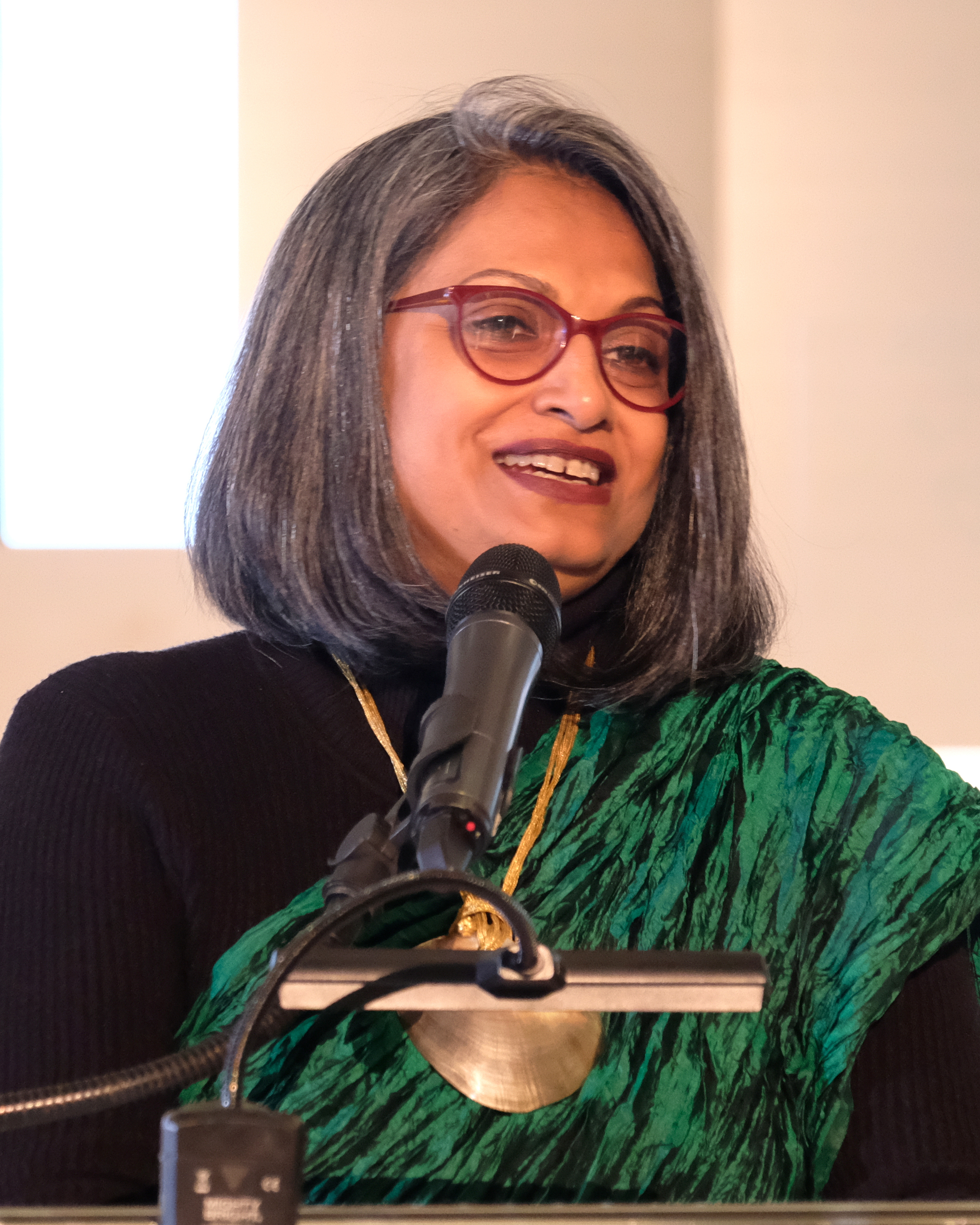
- Tabassum in Pinakothek der Moderne, Munich (2023)
- Born: 1968 or 1969 (age 56–57); Dhaka, Bangladesh
- Education: Bangladesh University of Engineering and Technology
- Occupation: Architect
- Awards: See full list
- Website: mtarchitekts.com

Marina Tabassum (born 1968 or 1969) is a Bangladeshi architect. She is the principal architect of Marina Tabassum Architects.

Tabassum won the Aga Khan Award for Architecture twice—in 2016 for the design of Bait-ur-Rouf Mosque in Dhaka, and again in 2025 for the design of Khudi Bari in various locations in Bangladesh. In 2020, Tabassum was listed by Prospect as the third-greatest thinker for the COVID-19 era, with the magazine writing: "At the forefront of creating buildings in tune with their natural environments, this Bangladeshi architect is also embracing the design challenges posed by what we are collectively doing to the planet." Tabassum was the first South Asian to receive the "Lisbon Triennale Lifetime Achievement Award" (2022). She was named on Time magazine's list of the 100 Most Influential People of 2024. In 2026, she was awarded with the Ekushe Padak, for her special contribution to architecture.

== Early life and education ==
Tabassum was born in Dhaka, Bangladesh, the daughter of an oncologist. Her family migrated to Dhaka, Bangladesh from India during the partition of Bengal in 1947. She attended Holy Cross Girls School and College. She then graduated in architecture from Bangladesh University of Engineering and Technology in 1994.

== Career ==
In 1995, Tabassum founded URBANA, an architecture practice based in Dhaka, Bangladesh with Kashef Chowdhury. The firm designed a number of projects for about ten years.

In 2005, Tabassum established Marina Tabassum Architects, and she serves as its principal architect.

Tabassum designed the Bait Ur Rouf Mosque in Dhaka, completed in 2012. She won her first Aga Khan Award for Architecture for this project in 2016.

As of 2025, Tabassum is a professor of Architectural Design for Climate Adaptation at the Department of Architecture at Delft University of Technology, Netherlands. She held the Gehry Chair at the University of Toronto during 2022–2023. She taught in Harvard Graduate School of Design, University of Texas, Bengal Institute and BRAC University.

Tabassum chairs Foundation for Architecture and Community Equity (F.A.C.E) and Prokritee, a fare trade organization. She is a fellow of the Royal Society of Arts (RSA).

== Notable works ==
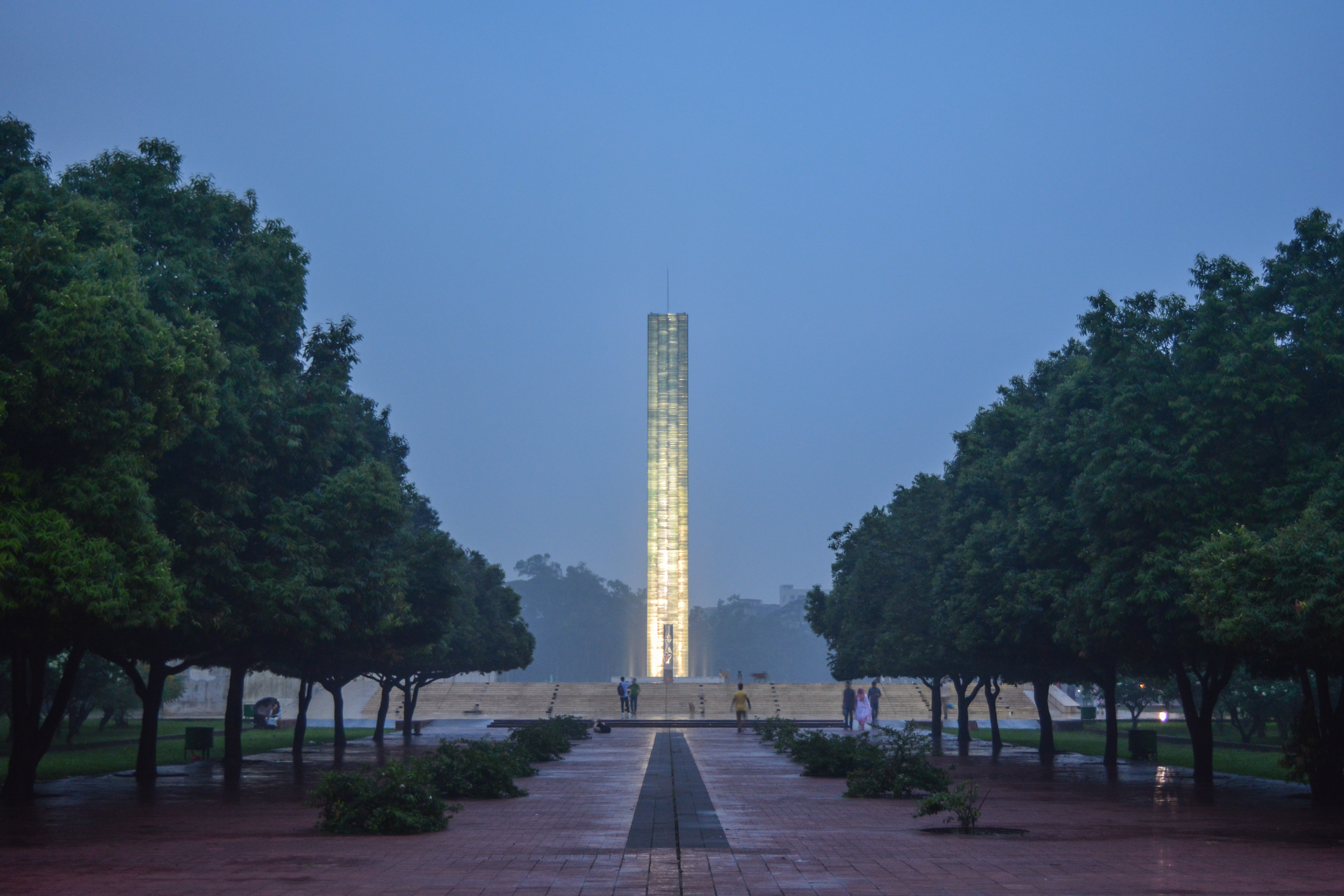
Museum of Independence

- 1997–2006: Museum of Independence, Dhaka, Bangladesh
- 2001: A5 Residence, Dhaka, Bangladesh
- 2006–2011: Comfort Reverie, Dhaka, Bangladesh
- 2009: Vacation House at Faridabad, Dhaka, Bangladesh
- 2012: Baitur Rouf Mosque, Dhaka, Bangladesh
- 2018: Panigram Eco Resort and Spa, Jashore, Bangladesh
- 2020: Khudi Bari, Chars in the coastal areas of Bangladesh
- 2025: 24th Serpentine Pavilion in Kensington Gardens, London.

== Awards and honors ==
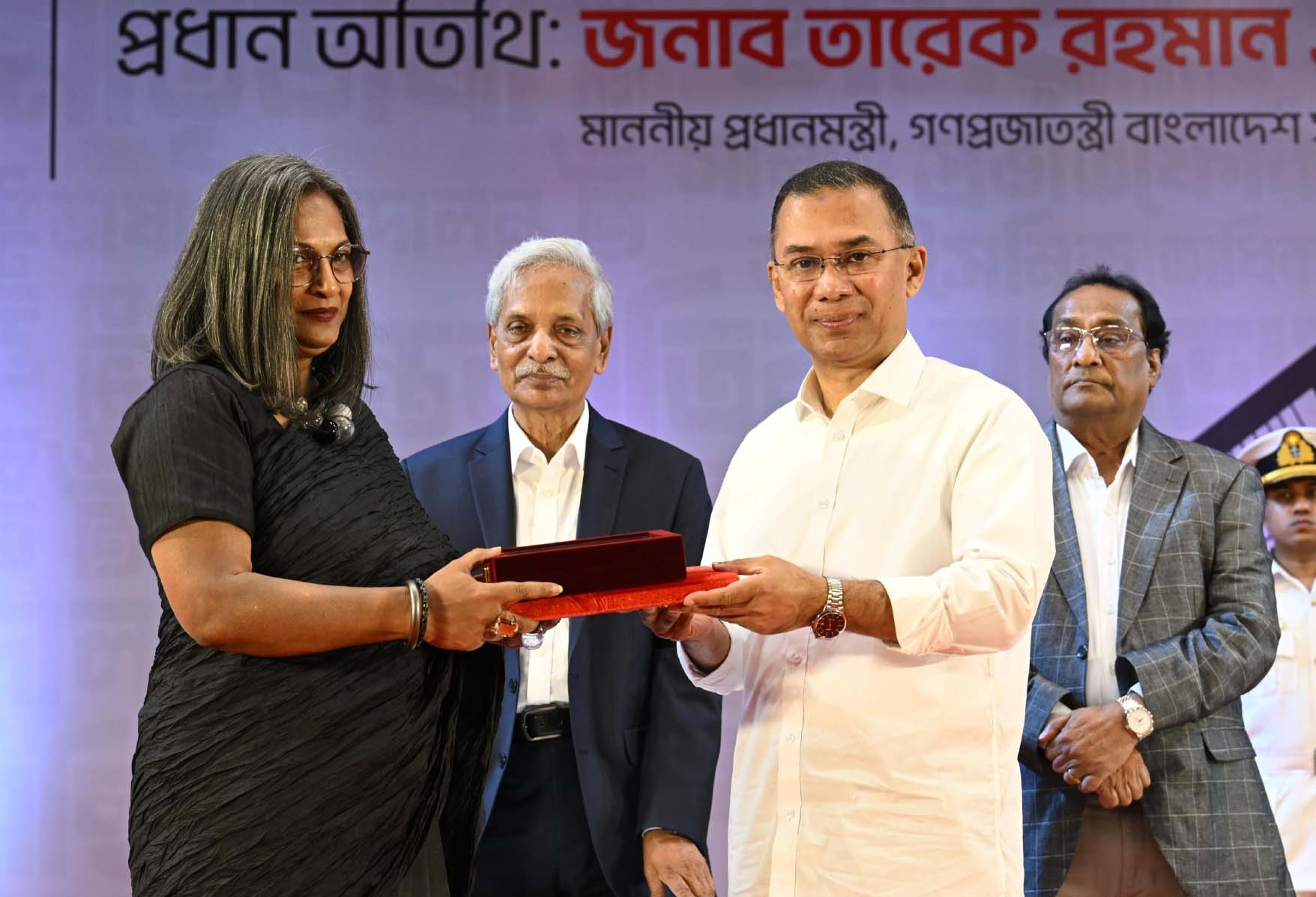
Prime Minister Tarique Rahman presenting the Ekushe Padak to Marina

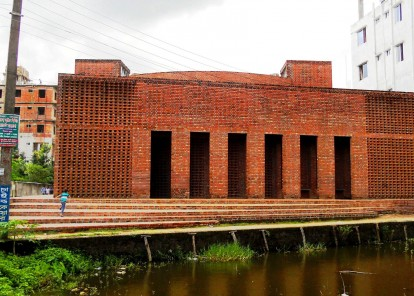
Baitur Rauf Mosque

- 1997: First prize for the Independence Monument and the Liberation War Museum by the Bangladeshi Prime Minister Sheikh Hasina
- 2001: Architect of the Year Award, by the Indian Vice President Bhairon Singh Shekhawat
- 2004: Anannya Top Ten Awards
- 2004: Finalist – Aga Khan Award (for A5, a pavilion apartment)
- 2006: Second runner-up – Nishorgo Architectural Competition
- 2016: Aga Khan Award for Architecture
- 2018: Jameel Prize, Victoria & Albert Museum
- 2021: Arnold W. Brunner Memorial Prize
- 2021: Soane Medal
- 2022: Lifetime Achievement Award
- 2024: Time list of 100 Most Influential People of 2024
- 2025: Aga Khan Award for Architecture
- 2026: Ekushe Padak

== Exhibitions ==
- 2023: Marina Tabassum Architects, Bangladesh
