= Swadhinata Stambha =

- স্বাধীনতা স্তম্ভ
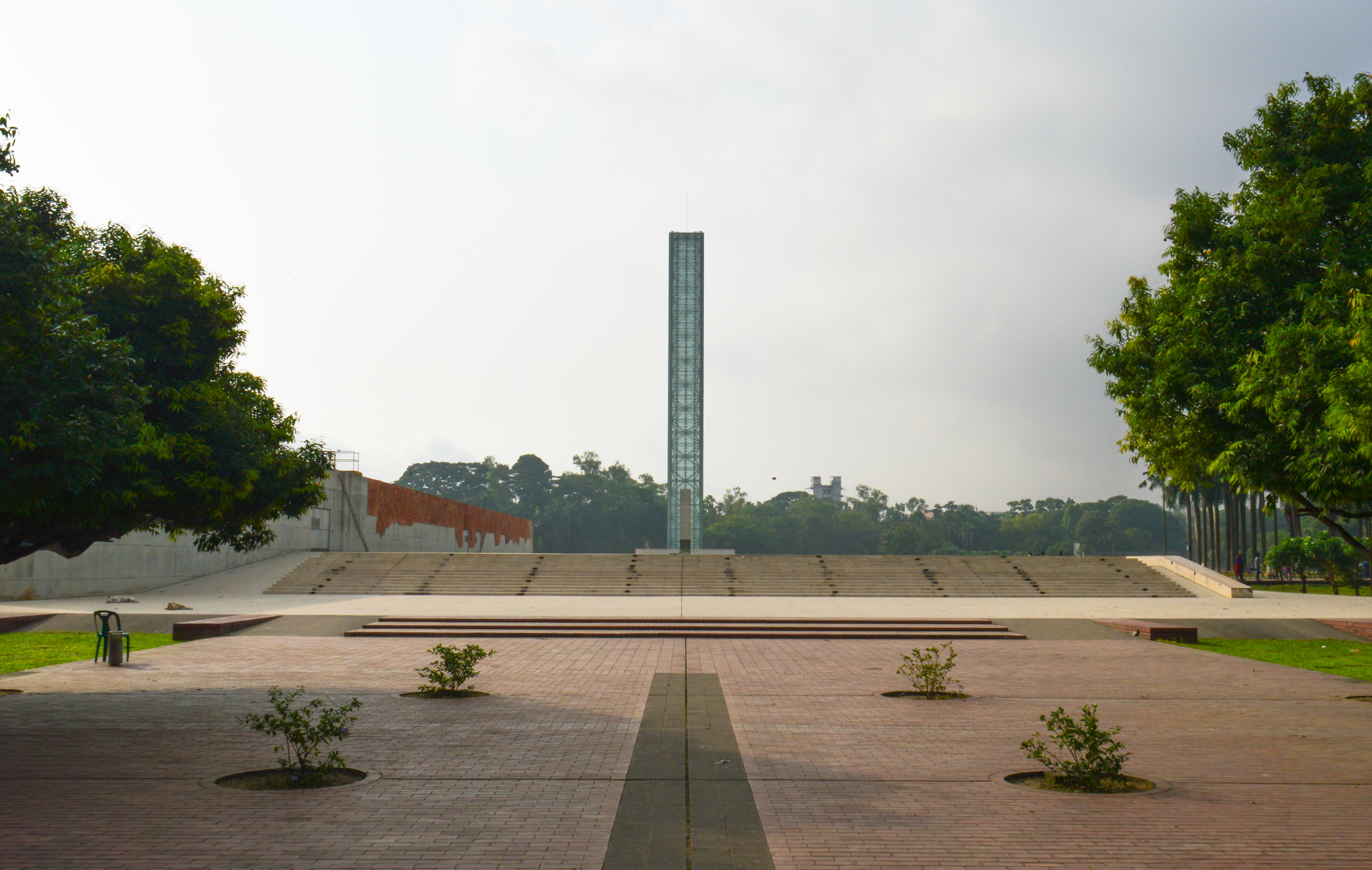
- The monument in 2017
- Interactive map of the Swadhinata Stambha area

General information
- Status: Completed
- Type: Public monument
- Location: New Dhaka, Bangladesh
- Construction started: 1999
- Completed: 2013

Design and construction
- Architects: Marina Tabassum, Kashef Mahboob Chowdhury

Swadhinata Stambha (Bengali: স্বাধীনতা স্তম্ভ, romanized: Sbādhīnôtā Stômbhô, lit. 'Independence Monument') is a national monument in Bangladesh to commemorate the historical events that took place in the Suhrawardy Udyan, previously known as Ramna Race Course ground regarding the Bangladesh Liberation War.

Government of Bangladesh took the initiative to build the monument in 1996. The construction began in 1999. Kashef Mahboob Chowdhury and Marina Tabassum designed the project. The main attraction of the project is a 50-meter high tower composed of stacked glass panels, which stands at the place where the Pakistani Instrument of Surrender was signed at the end of the war.

== Background ==
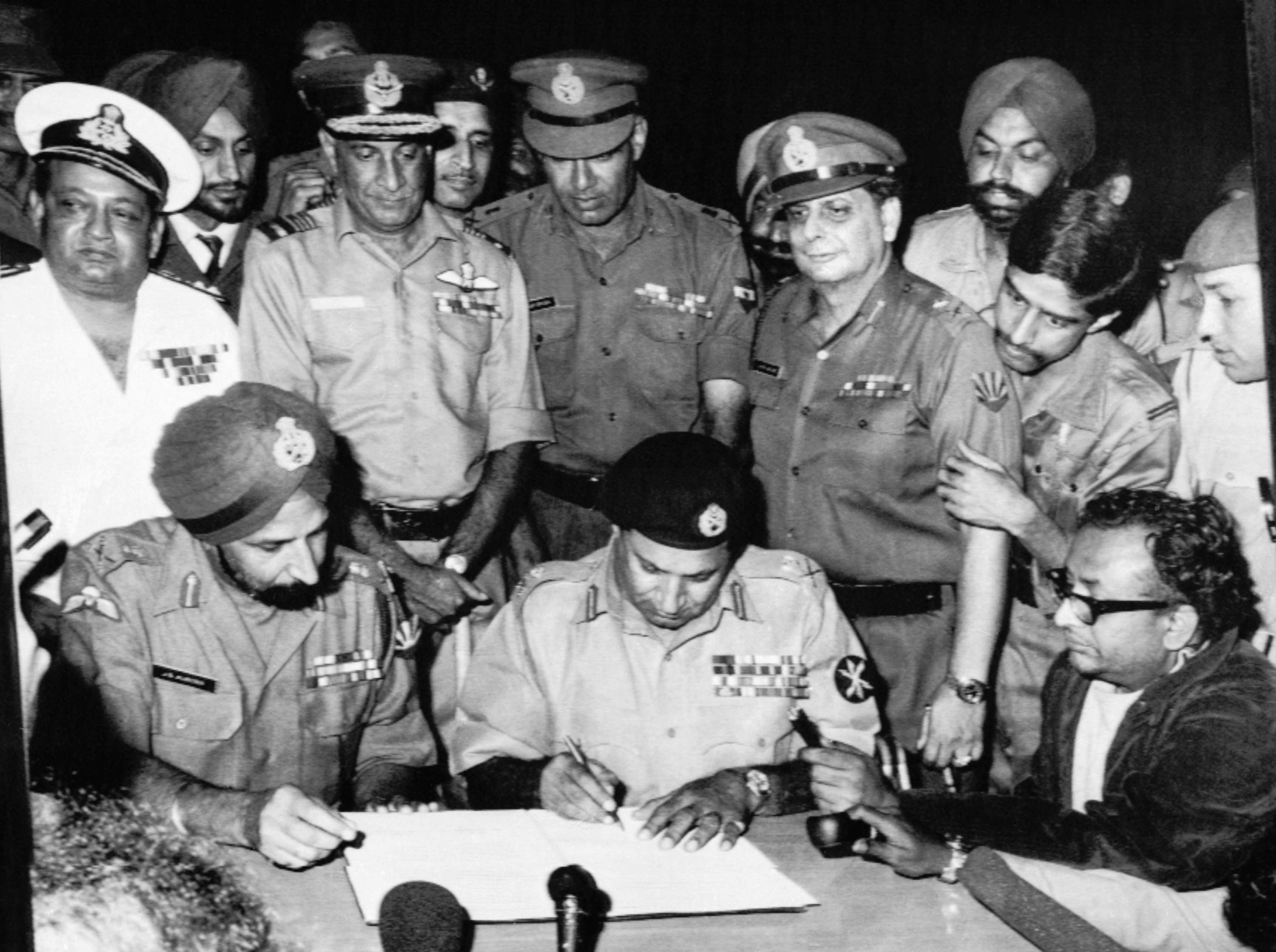
Lt Gen A A K Niazi signing the Pakistani Instrument of Surrender marked the end of the Bangladesh Liberation War of 1971 and the creation of Bangladesh.

The Suhrawardy Udyan of the capital Dhaka of Bangladesh is historical place. Many significant incidents took place in this place. On 7 March 1971, Sheikh Mujibur Rahman delivered his historical speech in this ground after Yahya Khan postponed the national assembly on 1 March of the year. In his speech, Sheikh Mujibur Rahman asked the people of Bangladesh to prepare themselves for a struggle.

The war broke out on 25 March, as the Pakistan Army cracked down on pro-independence Bengalis of the then East Pakistan. And after a nine-month-long independence war, Pakistani troops were defeated.

On 16 December 1971, the commander-in-chief of East Pakistan Army Amir Abdullah Khan Niazi surrendered to the joint force of Mukti Bahini and Indian Army in this ground.

To commemorate the historic events of the Independence War of Bangladesh, the Government of Bangladesh decided to restore the memories of the war and build the Swadhinata Stambha.

== History ==
In 1996, the Government of Bangladesh decided to build a monument to restore the memories of Bangladesh Liberation War in Suhrawardy Udyan of Dhaka.

In 1997 a competition was organised to select the best monument for the proposed project in Suhrawardy Udyan.

Kashef Mahboob Chowdhury and Marina Tabassum, two architects who graduated from Bangladesh University of Engineering and Technology came with a design of a suitable project.

Their proposed project included a museum, multi-media projection theatre, amphitheater and other ancillary facilities in addition to the main focus of the project, the monument itself. The focal point in the experience of the space is the monument: a Tower of Light made of stacked glass sheets.

The design presented by Kashef Mahboob Chowdhury and Marina Tabassum won the competition and their design was selected for the proposed project.

== Construction process ==
The foundation stone of the Swadhinata Stambha was laid in 1999. The construction of the project began in the same year. The construction was completed in two phases.

=== First phase ===
At first the area allocated for the proposed project was 24 acres. Later the area was increased to 67 acres. The project included a 100 meter long glass tower, an underground museum, mural works, amphitheater, a number of walkways, a water body and a very special 'eternal flame'. The construction of the project was supervised by Ministry of Housing and Public Works.

Under the first phase, the then Awami League government built the VIP and Service Blocks and most of the walkways, water body, mural works and development of south plaza and marble works.

Later in 2002, the BNP-Jamaat led coalition government established Ministry of Liberation War Affairs. The responsibility of the supervision of this project was handed over to the newly established ministry. During the BNP-Jamaat administration's rule, a stone holding a list of the pro-independence fighters who were martyred was made. The construction of the water-body was also completed. But the glass-tower was set aside terming it a very costly one.

The then prime minister and head of the BNP-Jamaat government, Khaleda Zia inaugurated the monument on 22 October 2006 without the glass tower.

=== Second phase ===
In 2009 after the government of Awami League came to power. The government increased the cost of the project to 1.8161 Billion BDT and named it as the second phase of construction. The glass-tower of the project that was abandoned by the previous government started again. The design was revised increasing the height to 150 feet.

On 7 March 2011, the government opened it for public amid a large number of its works are yet to be completed.

The glass-tower was completed in 2013 at a cost of 1.47 billion BDT.

== Architecture ==
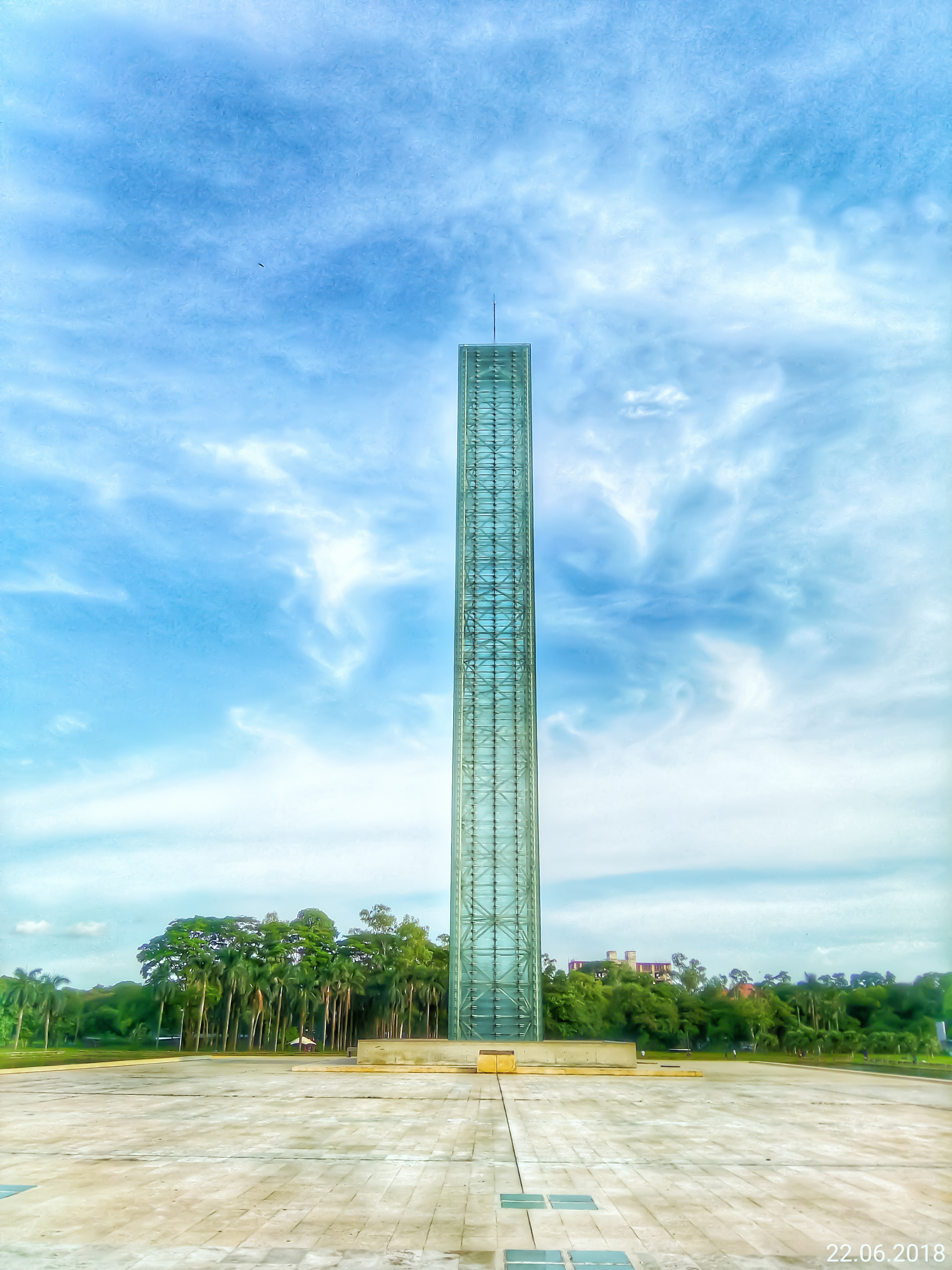
The Monument

The main attraction of the Swadhinata Stambha is the Stambha itself. Stambha means pillar or tower in Bengali. The tower was built on the place where the commander-in-chief of East Pakistan Army Amir Abdullah Khan Niazi signed the papers of his surrender.

During night, the tower looks elegant as the rays of light come out from every single inches of the tower. The whole tower turns into a white pillar. The tower is square according to the plan and is 16 feet wide from every side with an area of 64 inches.

The underground museum of the project comprises several photographs with historical significance. A large photograph of the historical 7th March Speech of Sheikh Mujibur Rahman is the main attraction of the underground museum.

There are a number of terracotta murals on war-heroes and the events of the Independence War, a 2000-seat auditorium, and an open-air theatre. The eternal flame stands beside the tower.

The water body of the project reflects the whole tower all the day and increases the beauty of the project. But the water body is under potential threat as the local slum-dwellers use it for their daily needs.

== Gallery ==
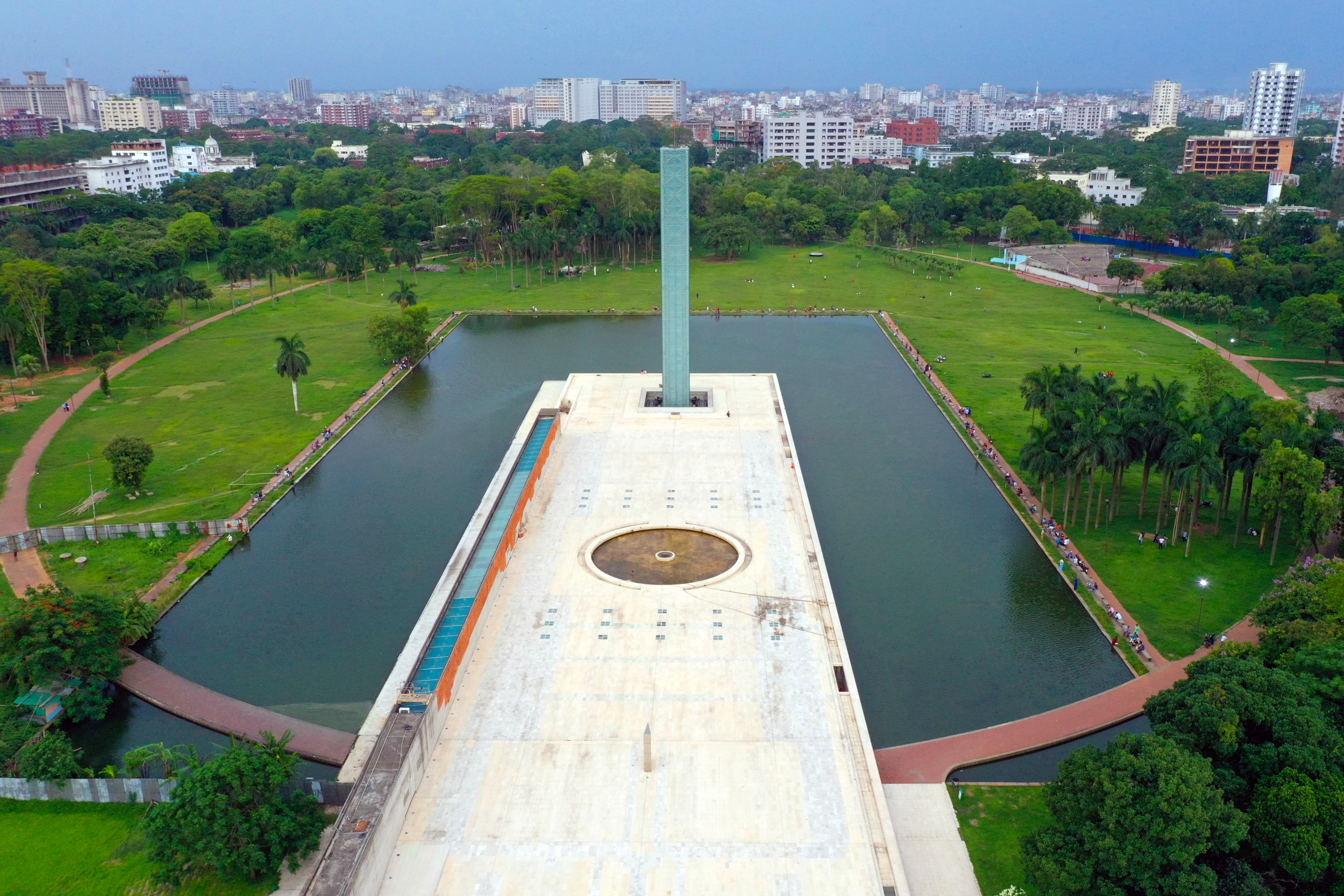

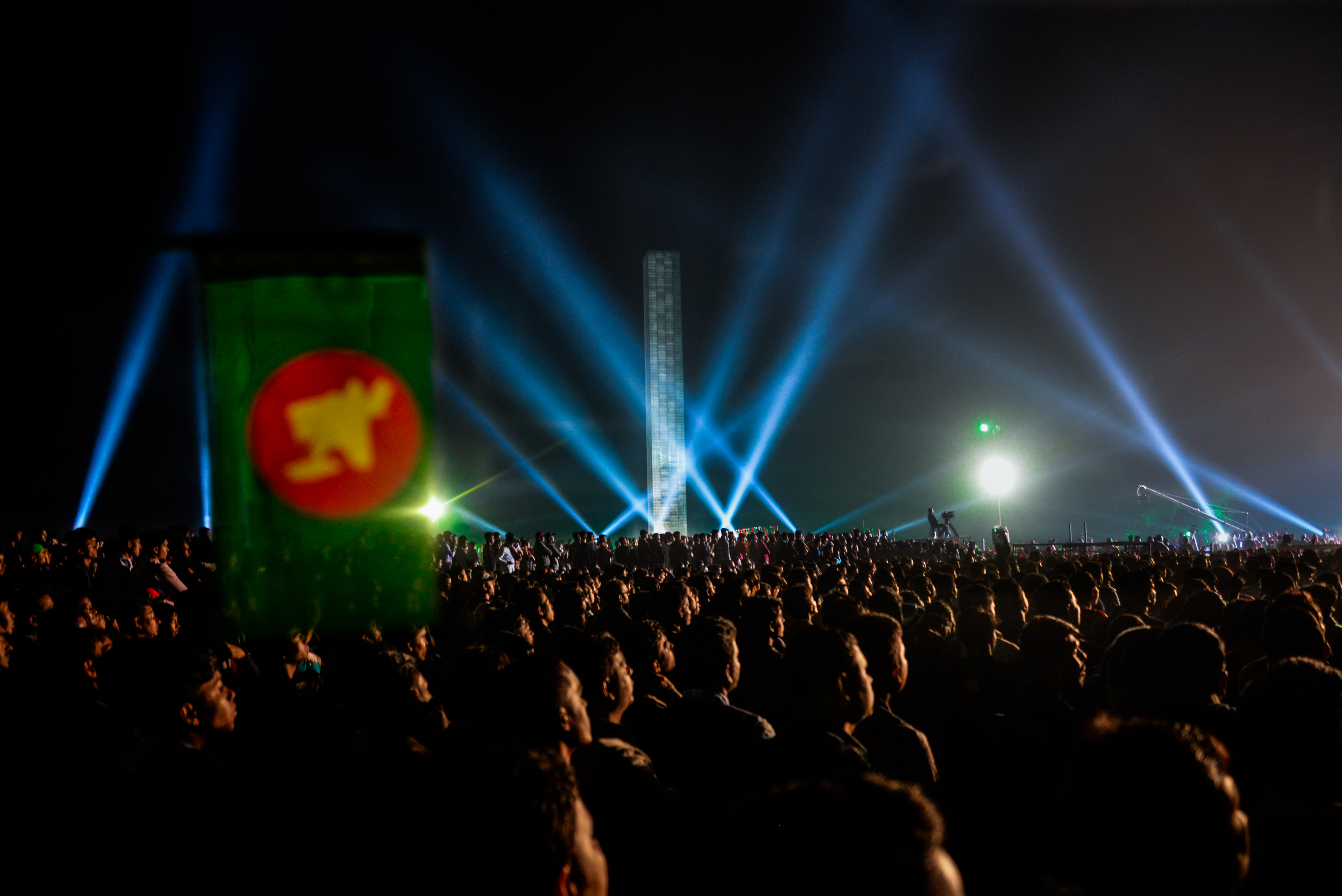

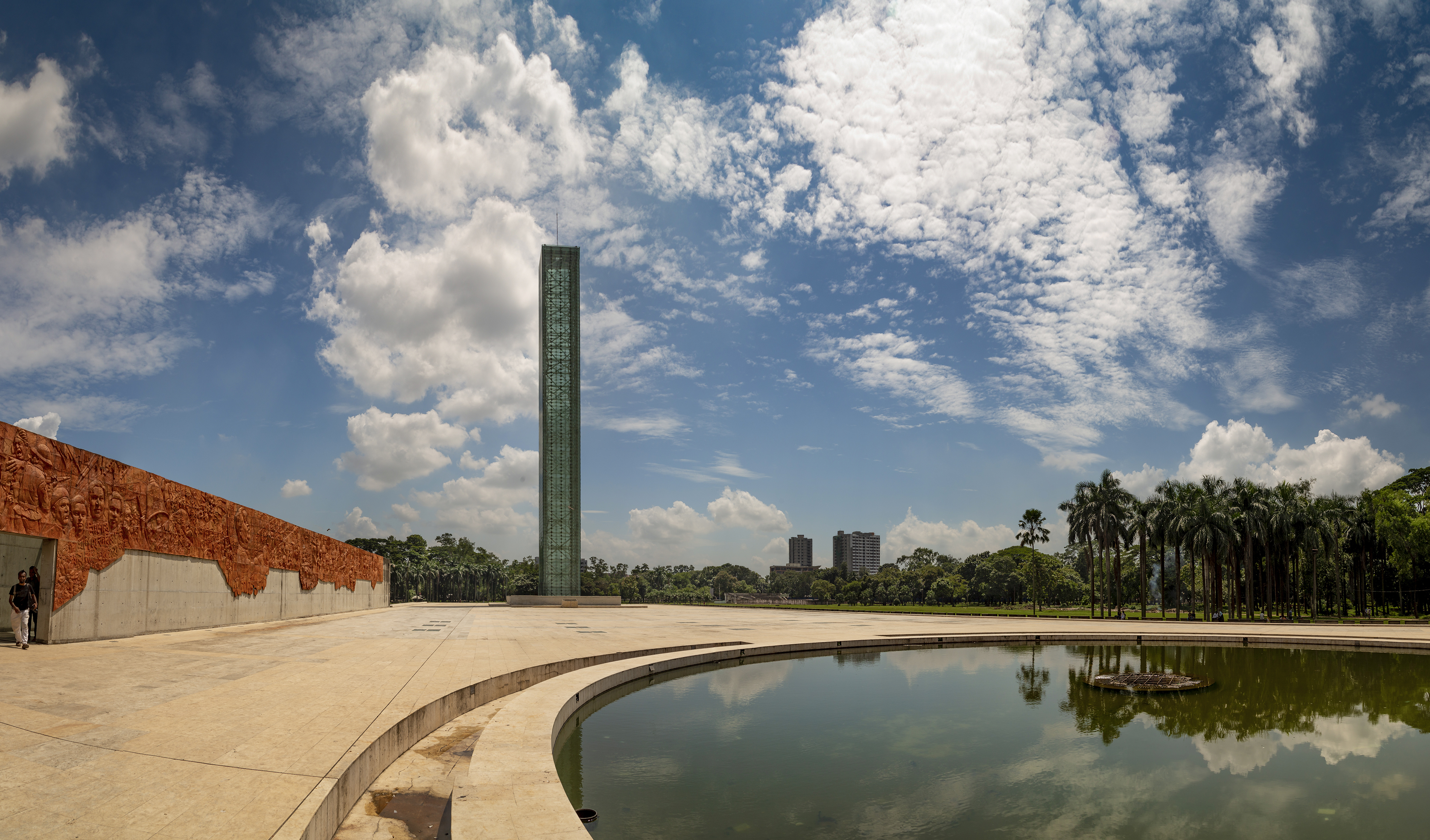

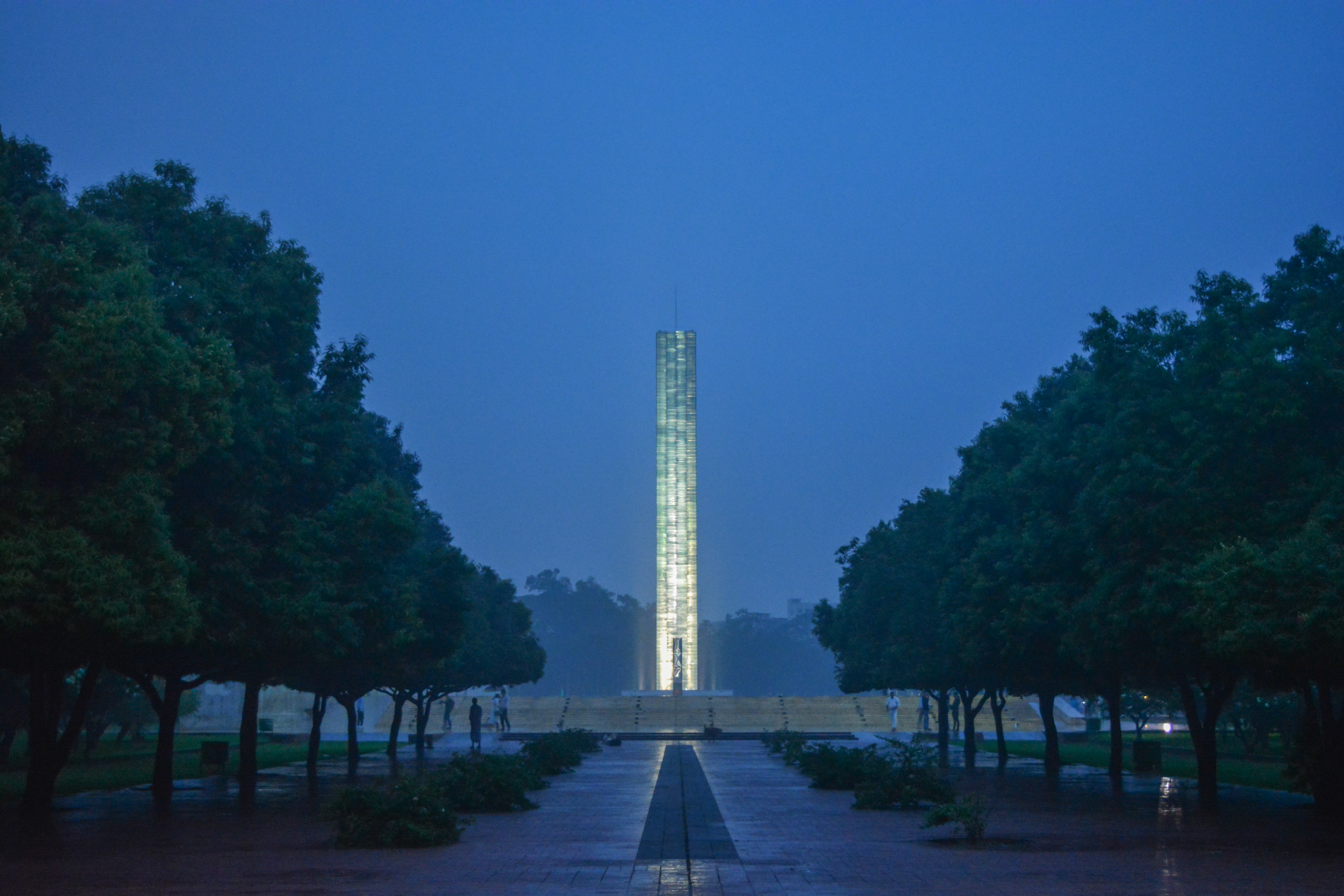

== See also ==
- List of national monuments of Bangladesh
