= Gulshan Society Mosque =

Mosque in Dhaka, Bangladesh

- গুলশান সোসাইটি জামে মসজিদ
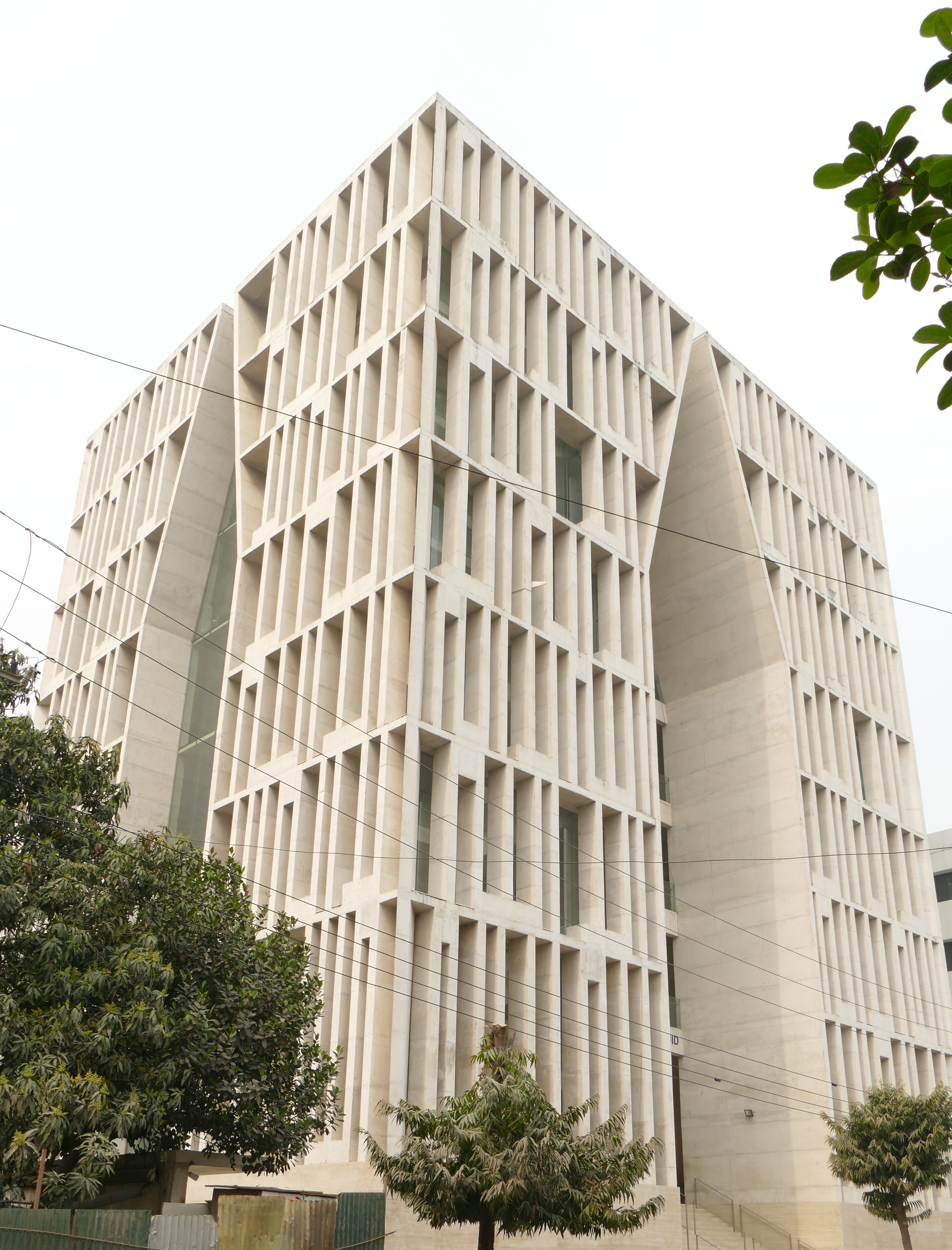

Religion
- Affiliation: Islam
- Ecclesiastical or organisational status: Active

Location
- Location: Dhaka, Bangladesh
- Interactive map of Gulshan Society Mosque
- Coordinates: 23.8008°N 90.4079°E

Architecture
- Type: Mosque
- Established: 2017

Website
- Gulshan Society Jame Masjid

The Gulshan Society Mosque, also called Gulshan Society Jame Masjid (Bengali: গুলশান সোসাইটি জামে মসজিদ), is a mosque in Gulshan, a neighbourhood in Dhaka. It was planned by Kashef Chowdhury and completed in 2017 for Gulshan Society.

== History ==
The Gulshan Society Mosque has seen a number of notable visitors. In February 2018 the head Imam of the Al-Aqsa Mosque, led prayers and delivered sermons in the Gulshan Society Mosque during his week long trip through Bangladesh. In September 2019 Australian High Commissioner to Bangladesh Julia Niblett and New Zealand High Commissioner to Bangladesh Joanna Kempkers visited the Mosque.

In September 2018 the Gulshan Society Mosque was shortlisted for the 11th Beazley Designs of the Year.

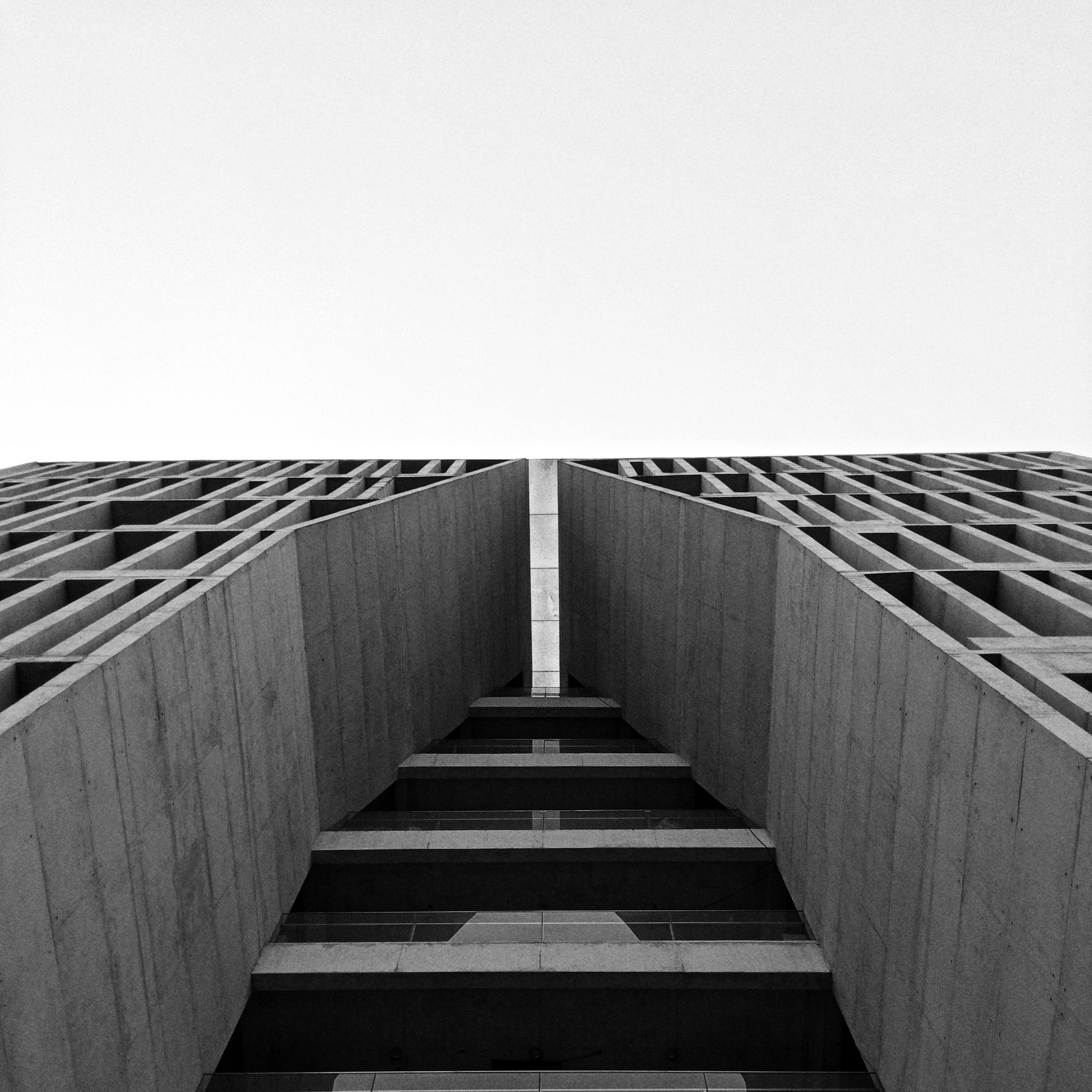
The architectural view of Gulshan Society Mosque

== Architecture ==
The seven-story-high modern building is constructed to give the impression of a monolith. It is made of white cast concrete. A screen structure running around the building provides light and ventilation to the inside. It is an abstract representation of “La-ilaha-illallah” in the Kufic script – the fundamental proclamation that there is only one God in Islam. The building was planned to accommodate a congregation of 2500. As the available plot of land was not large enough to build a mosque with the classic court-prayer hall sequence for that many people, the architect took a pragmatic approach and changed the usual layout of the mosque so that the stairs from the entrance directly lead to the main vestibule and prayer hall. Upper floors are accessible by elevators as well as by stairs.

== See also ==
- Islam in Bangladesh
- List of mosques in Bangladesh
