= Carla Juaçaba =

Brazilian architect

- Born: 1976; Rio de Janeiro
- Alma mater: Universidade Santa Úrsula
- Awards: AR Emerging Awards (2018); arcVision Prize (2013)
- Website: www.carlajuacaba.com

Carla Juaçaba (born 1976) is a Brazilian architect. In 2013, she won the inaugural arcVision Prize for Women in Architecture. In 2018, she became the first Brazilian architect to win the AR Emerging Awards.

== Early life and education ==
Juaçaba was born in Rio de Janeiro. She received a bachelor's degree in architecture and urbanism from Universidade Santa Úrsula and pursued postgraduate studies in structure at the Pontifical Catholic University of Rio de Janeiro, where she later became a lecturer.

== Career ==
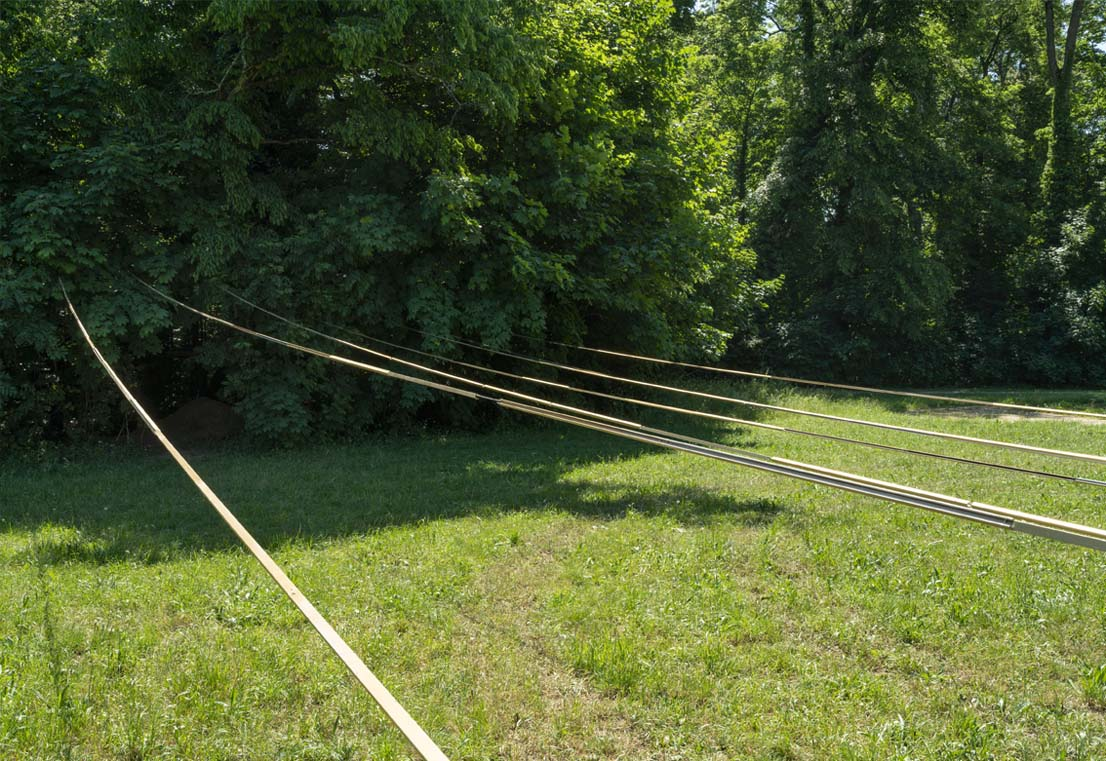
Detail of «Fil d'AIr» (2022), a project by Juacaba for OPEN HOUSE in Geneva

In 2000, Juaçaba established her own architecture practice. Her works spans both the public and private sectors, with a focus on residential and cultural projects. During her undergraduate years, she collaborated with Brazilian architect Gisela Magalhães on various museum-related projects.

She has lectured at the Harvard Graduate School of Design, the University of Toronto, and the Columbia University Graduate School of Architecture, Planning and Preservation.

In 2013, Juaçaba won the inaugural arcVision Prize for Women in Architecture. The jury, impressed by her work on the «Humanidade Pavilion 2012»—created for the United Nations Conference on Sustainable Development— praised her "creativity in seeking unconventional solutions and enormous sensitivity to the context in which her works will reside." The following year, she was nominated for the Schelling Architecture Award.

In 2018, she was selected to design a chapel for the Vatican's pavilion at the Venice Biennale of Architecture. Later that year, she became the first Brazilian architect to win the AR Emerging Awards.

In 2022, Juaçaba completed «Fil d'Air», an in-situ installation for the Open House exhibition on temporary housing, held in Geneva, Switzerland.
