= Kashef Mahboob Chowdhury =

Bangladeshi architect

- Education: Bangladesh University of Engineering and Technology
- Occupation: Architect
- Awards: Aga Khan Award for Architecture, 2014-2016 cycle
- Website: kashefchowdhury-urbana.com

Kashef Mahboob Chowdhury is a Bangladeshi architect.

== Early life and education ==
Chowdhury was born in Dhaka, the son of a civil engineer, growing up in Bangladesh and the Middle East before graduating in architecture from the Bangladesh University of Engineering and Technology (BUET) in 1995. In 2006, he attended the Glenn Murcutt Masterclass in Sydney.

== Career ==
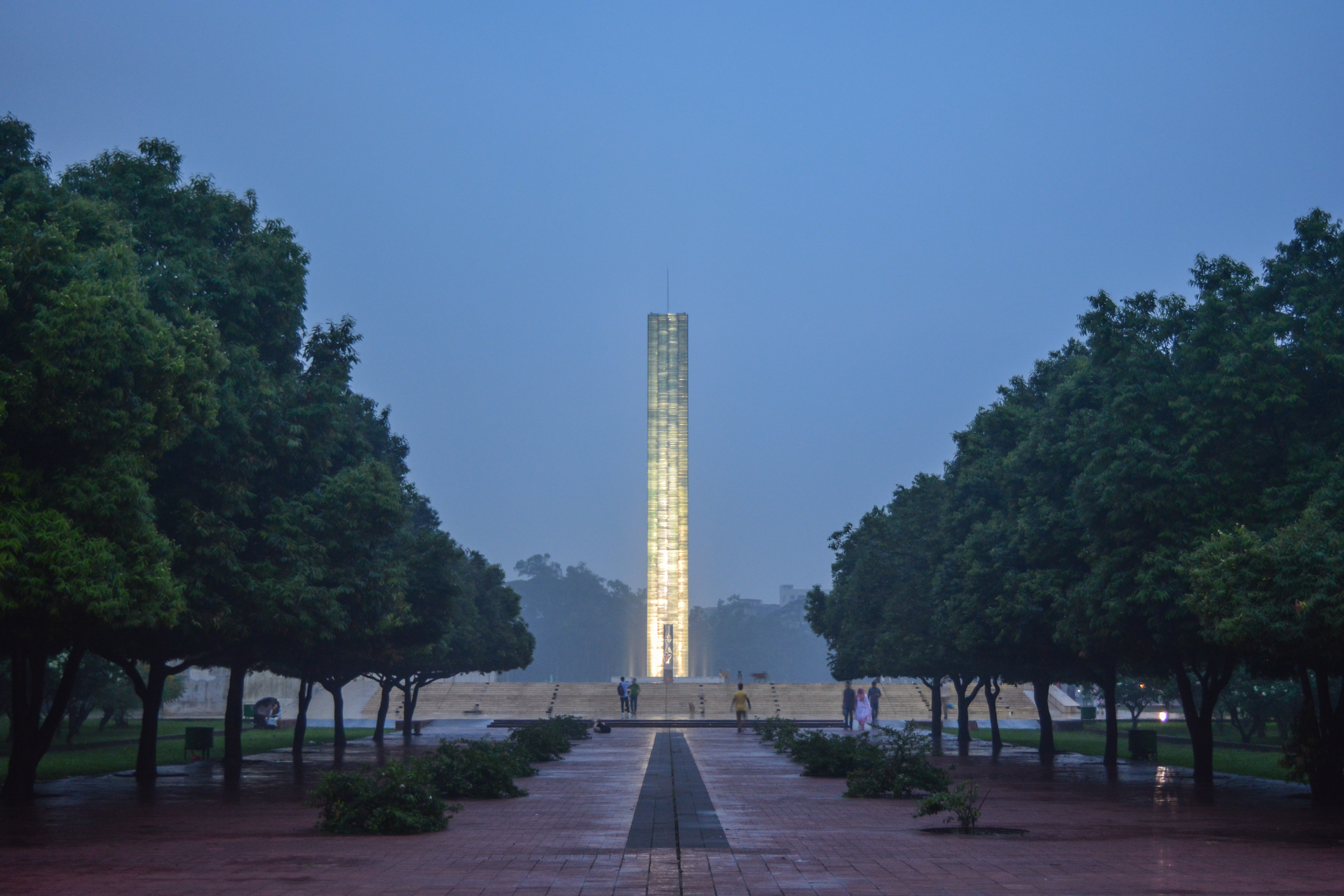
Museum of Independence

After working with architect Uttam Kumar Saha, he established the practice URBANA in partnership with Marina Tabassum in 1995. From 2005 he has continued as the Principal of the firm. Chowdhury is married to Rajrupa Chowdhury, an Indian classical musician of the instrument Sarod. They have a son, Rayan Mahboob Chowdhury.

Chowdhury has a studio based practice whose works find root in history with strong emphasis on climate, materials and context - both natural and human. Projects in the studio are given extended time for research so as to reach a level of innovation and original expression. Works range from conversion of ship and low cost raised settlements in 'chars' to training centre, mosque, art gallery, museum, residences and multi-family housing to corporate head offices.

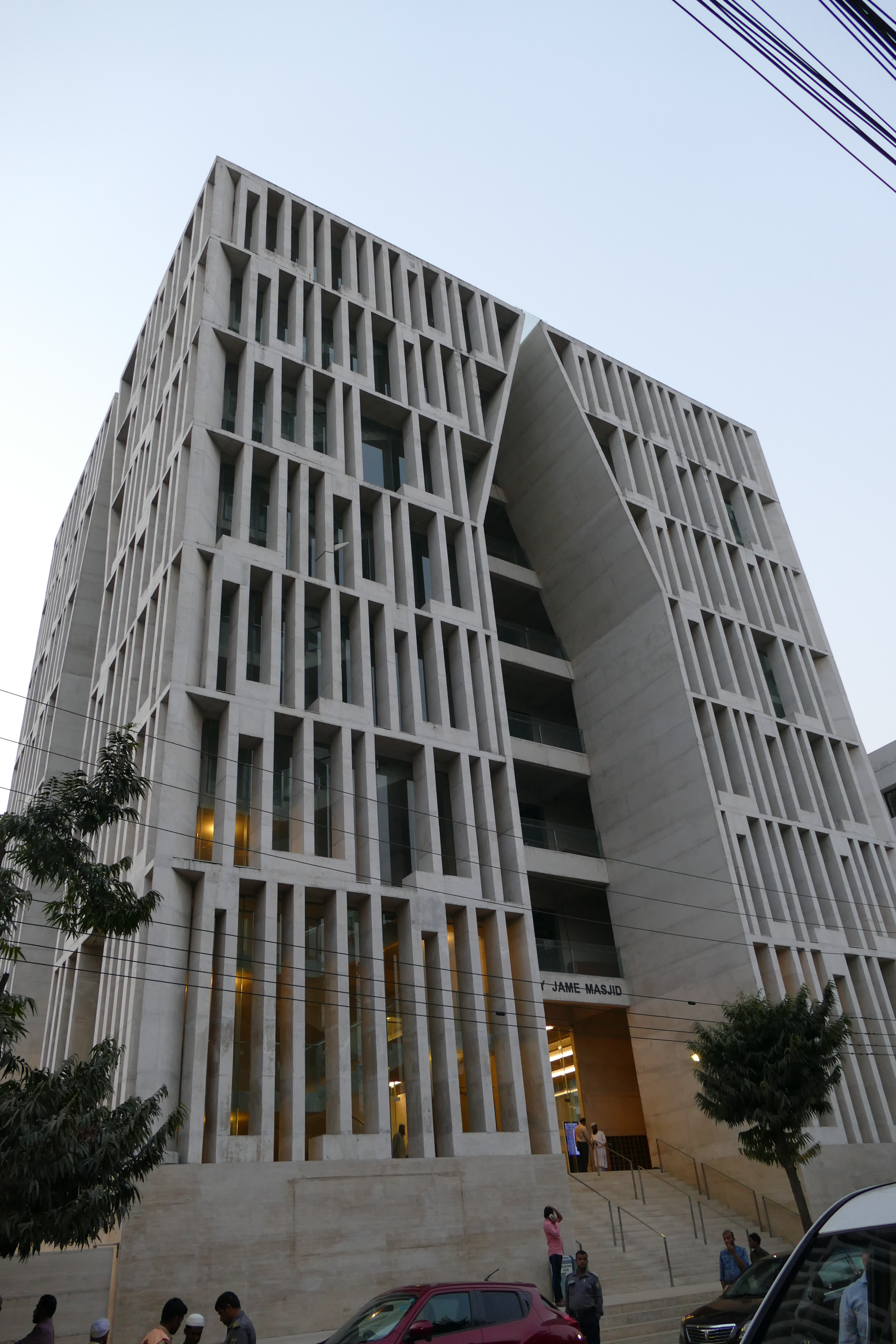
Gulshan Society Jame Mosque

Chowdhury has been a visiting faculty at the North South University and BRAC University, both in Bangladesh and has been a juror in final year crits in universities in Dhaka. He was twice finalist in the Aga Khan Award for Architecture and has won first prize in Architectural Review's AR+D Emerging Architecture Award 2012.

Chowdhury takes an active interest in art and in 2004 presented a lecture series 'Aspects of Contemporary Art in Germany' at the Goethe Institut, Dhaka. He has worked as a professional photographer and has held seven solo exhibitions. He has designed and published three books: Around Dhaka, 2004; Plot Number Fifty Six, 2009 and The Night of Fifteen November, 2011 - a photographic and recorded account of some survivors of the Cyclone Sidr in the coastal areas of Bangladesh.

Catherine Slessor and Rob Gregory, writing in 'Emerging Architecture and Creative Resilience' (Architectural Review, December 2012) notes: "In his studio, time is held in high regard, so much so that until recently he deliberately resisted using any form of artificial light, choosing instead to operate the business during daylight hours. This was done to enforce a natural pattern to the working day, and to encourage people not to work excessively long hours, and while changes to this routine were perhaps inevitable, Chowdhury maintains his respect of time, stating his desire to separate his studio from the influences of ‘the passing world’ to avoid ‘rushing through the design process’, and to always remember that ‘time is of the essence’." and was nominated for the Aga Khan Award for Architecture 2010 for designing the Chandgaon Mosque in Chittagong.

== Notable works ==
- 1997-2006: Museum of Independence, Dhaka, Bangladesh
- 2001: A5 Residence, Dhaka, Bangladesh
- 2007: Chandgaon Mosque, Chittagong, Bangladesh
- 2011: Friendship Centre, Gaibandha, Bangladesh
- 2013: EHL Premium Condominiums, Dhaka, Bangladesh
- 2017: Gulshan Society Mosque, Dhaka, Bangladesh

== Awards ==
- First prize for the Independence Monument and the Museum of Independence by the Bangladeshi Prime Minister Sheikh Hasina (1997)
- Finalist of Aga Khan Award for A5, a pavilion apartment (2004)
- First runner-up of Nishorgo Architectural Competition (2006)
- Institute of Architects Bangladesh (IAB) Design Award, Bangladesh, 2010
- AR+ Emerging Architecture Award, UK, 2012
- Architect of the Year Award (AYA) for Focus Countries, India, 2013
- Aga Khan Award for Architecture, for Friendship Center 2014-16 Cycle
- RIBA International Awards for Excellence 2021
