= Juan Miró =

Spanish-American architect

Juan Miró is a Spanish-American architect. He is Director of the Studio Mexico Program and a professor at the University of Texas at Austin. Professor Miró has directed Studio Mexico since 1998, a program that affords students the opportunity to travel to and explore Mexican culture through the study of architecture, drawing, and design. He teaches at the School of Architecture and his areas of interests are design and construction, Mexican architecture and architectural history, and the role of architects in the shaping of cities in the U.S. and abroad. He is particularly interested in looking at architectural history with the eyes of a designer.

== Biography ==
Miró was born in Barcelona and grew up in Madrid. He obtained his professional degree at the Escuela de Arquitectura of the Universidad Politécnica de Madrid, and studied at Yale University under Michael Sorkin and Charles Gwathmey. Additionally, he is a 1989 Fulbright Scholarship recipient. In 1999 Miró won the Texas Excellence in Teaching Award from the UT Ex-Students Association (also known as Texas Exes). The following year, he was honored with the New Faculty Teaching Award by the Association of Collegiate Schools of Architecture (ACSA). In 2004, he took home an "Austin Under 40" award in recognition of his professional and personal contributions to the Austin community.

Miró and his partner and brother-in-law Miguel Rivera lead Miró Rivera Architects, an Austin, Texas-based architectural firm they founded in 2000. The firm won the 2006 AR Emerging Architecture Award, and works on a variety of projects including institutional, commercial, and residential architecture and urban design. One of their most recent projects was the grandstand and facilities at the Circuit of the Americas (COTA)/Formula 1 (F1) racetrack in Austin. Miró is a licensed architect in Spain, Texas, New York, and Utah. As an active member of the American Institute of Architects (AIA), he has served as a juror for AIA award competitions at national, state, and local levels. In 2011 he was elevated to Fellow of the American Institute of Architects.

Prior to forming Miró Rivera Architects, Miró worked in Spain with his architect father Antonio Miró on a wide range of projects. Both Mirós collaborated with and were influenced by the work of other Spanish architects, including Félix Candela, Emili Donato, and Fernando Higueras. Juan also worked at Gwathmey Siegel and Associates in New York City from 1991 to 1996.

== Sources ==
- Juan Miro Faculty Profile
- Miró Rivera Architects
- AIA Austin Profile
