= Chandgaon Mosque =

Mosque in Chittagong, Bangladesh

- চান্দগাঁও মসজিদ
- Location of the mosque in Bangladesh

Religion
- Affiliation: Sunni Islam
- Ecclesiastical or organizational status: Mosque
- Status: Active

Location
- Location: Chandgaon Thana, Chittagong
- Country: Bangladesh
- Interactive map of Chandgaon Mosque
- Coordinates: 22°23′53″N 91°51′27″E

Architecture
- Architect: Kashef Mahboob Chowdhury
- Type: Mosque architecture
- Style: Islamic
- Funded by: Faisal M. Khan
- Groundbreaking: July 2006
- Completed: 2007
- Construction cost: US$336,760

Specifications
- Dome: One
- Materials: Reinforced concrete; red brick; marble; glass

The Chandgaon Mosque (Bengali: চান্দগাঁও মসজিদ, Arabic: مسجد تشاندغاو) is a Sunni mosque in Chittagong, Bangladesh, completed in 2007. Designed by Kashef Mahboob Chowdhury, it was shortlisted for the Aga Khan Award for Architecture in 2010.

== History ==
Chittagong, an ancient seaport, was under various rulers, beginning with Muslim control in the 13th century, followed by Portuguese dominance in the 16th and 17th centuries. Muslim rule was restored by the Mughals in 1666 and lasted until the early 19th century. With the rise of British power in India, Chittagong became a key area for the British East India Company, known for its tea and jute. During World War II, the British developed Chittagong into a significant military base, which was heavily bombed by the Japanese. After the Bangladesh War of Liberation in 1971, post-independence, Chittagong has become a major hub for import-export activities and has seen substantial industrial growth, particularly in shipping. The northern section, Chandgaon, is part of the 2nd Extended Ward of Chittagong City Corporation. With the largest port on the Bay of Bengal, Chittagong remains a vital center for trade and business to this day.

=== Contextualizing the Chandgaon Mosque ===
Chandgaon, a village with around 4,500 inhabitants, lies on the northern edge of Chittagong. It is rapidly changing due to economic growth driven by the ready-made garments sector, a key part of Bangladesh's economy. Despite this growth, the village still maintains its traditional rural and agricultural lifestyle, with rice paddies dominating the landscape. On the city's periphery, Chandgaon features modern buildings made of reinforced concrete and brick, dating from the 1950s onward. Notably, the organized modernist architecture of the 3- to 4-storey apartment buildings from the 1950s to 1970s stand out. However, rapid urbanization and industrialization since the late 1980s have led to the construction of many poorly designed concrete buildings, contributing to Chittagong's current unappealing urban landscape. In essence, the city of Chittagong needed to revive the original innovative touch that the first modernist buildings brought and, at the same time, reconnect the modernist architecture with traditional Bangladeshi vernacular architecture.

As a result, the Chandgaon Mosque project, initiated by businessman and former Foreign Minister Morshed Khan, aimed to replace an old, deteriorating mosque - which is used currently being used as a school - with a modern, monolithic structure that reflects contemporary universal values. The project, driven by his son Faisal M. Khan, also intended to create a community center that integrates architecture with social purpose. Faisal M. Khan emphasized two main goals: contributing to the community and serving as a model for similar projects inspired by practices in Arabic countries. Another of the project's overarching goals was to emphasize ecological sustainability through the various design elements. The Master Plan for the Chandgaon Mosque eventually expanded to include an orphanage, observatory/minaret, and potentially a library.

=== Rural Bangladeshi vernacular architecture ===
The architectural character of Chandgaon and Chittagong is influenced by their river delta location. Local construction relies on readily available materials like bamboo, brick, and clay-rich mud. In the villages, residential architecture typically features clusters of houses based on extended family ties. The standard mosque architecture in Bangladesh includes a series of open and closed courts with permeable walls; the common layout of an open porch or court and a covered main space remains consistent throughout urban and rural mosque architecture.

=== Construction schedule and project expenses ===
==== Construction timeline ====
The Changdoan Mosque project began with Kashef Chowdhury receiving the commission for the concept design in March 2006, which was completed by June 2006. Construction took place from July 2006 to December 2007, with the main prayer hall and forecourt finished by January 2008, allowing activities to start then. Further construction included the ablution building and plaza in 2009, with the minaret/observatory planned for 2010.

==== Costs ====
The total project cost was US$336,760, or $321 per square meter, excluding the plot of land valued at $895,493. All expenses were covered by Faisal M. Khan on behalf of the Khan family. The mosque's maintenance costs approximately $170 per month, covering electricity, water, cleaning, and security.

== Architecture ==
=== Structure ===
The Changdoan Mosque is constructed from reinforced concrete, featuring thick beams, foundation beams, and wide spans to create large open spaces. The forecourt has columns placed at the four corners, while the main prayer area requires additional interior columns to support the heavy roof and dome while maintaining openness. The structure includes horizontal beams above and below the wide spans, supported by a dense network of sand pilings and concrete footings beneath each column to stabilize the building in the soft delta soil. The dome is a cast-in-place concrete shell with an edge beam, finished with plaster, and lateral steel mullions support the interior cut surface.

=== Plans and facades ===
The plan of the building is made up of two equal rectangular spaces; one rectangle would be the main prayer hall and the other would include the entrance and a courtyard. Between these two spaces is a narrow passage that is shaded by small beams which connect the buildings together. The front court has openings on all sides, and the effect of a courtyard is created by cutting the ceiling in a circle shape; this opening in the ceiling is also maintained in the prayer hall but the difference is that the prayer hall is covered by a split dome. There are no other curvilinear forms in the complex; the mihrab is a minimalistic and it is emphasized by receding the part of the qiblah wall by a meter. There are very small cuts in the qiblah wall in the shape of irregular rectangles for the placement of Qur'ans. Facing the main entrance is the ablutions area, which is located near the entrance of the complex.

=== Unique features ===
The project has a unique dome that is cut in half. This split dome is shaped as if an orange slice was taken from the middle part of half an orange. The two halves are also separated by around 20 centimetres (7.9 in). This allows for the air to circulate vertically achieving the stack effect, that allows hot air to escape from above due to the difference in density between cold air particles and hot air particles.

=== Materials ===
The structures in the complex were constructed using reinforced concrete and the in-fills are red bricks. The structures were then plastered in white. Since there is an emphasis on minimalism, the architects maintained the plain white plastered aesthetic and did not add any ornamentation to any of the structural elements. The dome's interior sides - which are facing each other - are a curtain wall. This ensures the maximization of illumination during the day and it allows for the dome to become a beacon of light from the lights coming from the inside during the night. The ground in the prayer hall is made of up marble and does not include a carpet. The interior wall in the mihrab is made of marble that was imported from Italy; and the entrance side of the prayer hall has a couple of short glass walls and glass doors between them.

== See also ==
- Islam in Bangladesh
- List of mosques in Bangladesh
