= AR Emerging Awards =

International architecture prize

AR Emerging awards
- Awarded for: Early recognition to young designers and celebrate the architectural stars of tomorrow
- Sponsored by: The Architectural Review
- Country: United Kingdom
- First award: 1999; 27 years ago
- Website: emerging.architectural-review.com

The AR Emerging Awards, previously known as the AR Emerging Architecture Awards, is an annual international prize that "grants early recognition to young designers and celebrates the architectural stars of tomorrow."

Founded in 1999 by the British architectural magazine The Architectural Review, the award includes a £5,000 prize and features the winner in the pages of the printed magazine.

== History ==
Launched in 1999, the AR Emerging Architecture awards—as it was originally named—was established "in response to the heavy-hitting Gold Medals, Pritzkers, and other lifetime achievement awards."

Architects and professionals in other design disciplines whose qualifications are recognized by their local accreditation bodies are eligible to apply, provided they are 45 years old or younger in the year of submission.

Originally, completed work such as "buildings, interiors, landscaping, refurbishment, urban projects, temporary installations, furniture and product designs" were all eligible for submission. Since 2020, however, the award has shifted to recognize a trajectory portfolio, emphasizing a body of work rather than a single project.

== Winners ==
Year	Winner	Project or Category	Country
1999	Hans Olav Hesseberg, Sixten Rahlff, and Eli Synnevåg	Orphanage in Nepal	Norway
2000	Rick Joy		United States
2004	Yasuhiro Yamashita	Cell Brick	Japan
2006	Anna Heringer and Eike Roswag	Handmade School in Bangladesh	Germany
2006	Miró Rivera Architects (Juan Miró + Miguel Rivera)	Pedestrian Bridge in Texas	United States
2006	Sou Fujimoto Architects	Children's Treatment Center	Japan
2007	Ecosistema Urbano	EcoBoulevard	Spain
2007	Taketo Shimohigoshi	Vegetation Installation	Japan
2007	Frohn & Rojas	Wall House	Chile
2008	Emiliano López and Mónica Rivera	Hotel	Spain
2008	Anna Heringer	Houses	Germany
2008	Alberto Mozó	Offices and Shops	Chile
2009	Atelier Li Xiaodong	Bridge School at Pinghe	China
2009	ODOS Architects	Knocktopher Friary	Ireland
2009	José María Sánchez García	Sports Development Center in Guijo de Granadilla	Spain
2009	Matharoo Associates	Curtain Door, Dilip Sanghvi Residence	India
2010	Architects Atelier Ryo Abe	Shima Kitchen	Japan
2010	Carmody Groarke	Studio East Dining Stratford	United Kingdom
2010	Neri & Hu Design and Research Office	The Waterhouse South Bund	China
2011	Boonserm Premthada	Film Institute	Thailand
2011	Creus e Carrasco	Harbour Remodelling	Spain
2012	Langarita Navarro	Music Academy	Spain
2012	Hiroshi Nakamura	Optical Glass House	Japan
2012	5468796 Architecture	Bloc10 Housing	Canada
2012	Urbana (Kashef Mahboob Chowdhury + Uttam Kumar Saha)	Friendship Center	Bangladesh
2013	RAAAF		Netherlands
2014	Shingo Masuda + Katsuhisa Otsubo	Boundary Window	Japan
2015	Supermachine Studio	10 Cal Tower	Thailand
2016	Frida Escobedo	La Tallera Siqueiros	Mexico
2017	Avenier and Cornejo Architects	Rue Bonnet Social Housing	France
2018	Carla Juaçaba		Brazil
2019	Comunal Taller de Arquitectura	Social Production of Habitat	Mexico
2020	Carles Enrich Studio		Spain
2022	Instituto Balear de la Vivienda		Spain
2023	TO (José Amozurrutia and Carlos Facio)		Mexico
2024	A Threshold		India
2025	ARB Architects		Vietnam
