= Gulshan Society =

- Formation: 2002
- Type: Nonprofit organization
- Location: Dhaka, Bangladesh
- Secretary General: Syed Ahsan Habib
- President: Omar Sadat
- Vice President: Syed Almas Kabir
- Vice President: Israt Jahan
- Key people: Ali Ashfaq; Mozibur Rahman Mridha; Zeenat Aman; Mohammed Mohsin; Mosud Mannan; Pulak Podder; Tasmin Akther; Srabanti Datta; Zafrul Islam; Masum Majumder; Khaled Shams; Arafat Ashwad Islam; Amirul Islam Chowdhury; Khadem Md. Raiyan Sadid
- Website: gulshansociety.org

== History ==
The Gulshan Society is a non-profit, non-political neighborhood association located in the Gulshan area of Dhaka, Bangladesh. It was established in 2002, the society serves as a representative body for the residents of Gulshan Model Town, a prominent residential area in the capital city. Retired civil servant Abdul Muyeed Chowdhury was the founding president of the Society, serving from 2002 to 2006. Barrister Omar Sadat is the current president of the Gulshan Society (2024-2026).

== Key activities ==
The society is governed by a memorandum of association and a constitution that outlines its objectives and operational procedures.

1. Community Facilitator: Gulshan Society fulfills a facilitatory role by actively collaborating with RAJUK, Dhaka North City Corporation, and other public bodies and stakeholders to propose and participate in infrastructure development initiatives. These initiatives encompass the enhancement of roads, parks, walkways, law and order measures, and providing various civic utility services to meet the requirements of Gulshan residents.
2. Environmental Initiatives: The society strongly emphasizes environmental sustainability. To preserve the area's greenery and water bodies, it organizes tree-planting drives, promotes waste segregation, and campaigns for pollution control.
3. Security and Safety: The organization collaborates with law enforcement agencies to ensure the safety and security of Gulshan residents. It assists various law enforcement agencies with surveillance of security cameras and road safety measures.
4. Cultural and Social Events: Gulshan Society organizes cultural, health, and sporting events to build community and raise awareness of social and environmental issues.
5. Lake, Park, and Mosque: RAJUK has designated the Gulshan Society to oversee the development and upkeep of the Gulshan Lake. In addition, the Fazle Rabbi and Justice Shahabuddin Ahmed parks, are managed and maintained by the Gulshan Society. The Justice Shahabuddin Ahmed Park Management Committee is chaired by Arafat Ashwad Islam.

With contributions from various private individuals, the Gulshan Society has constructed a mosque in North Gulshan—the Gulshan Society Mosque. This contemporary architectural achievement is opposite the Gulshan Society Lake Park, which RAJUK has leased to the Gulshan Society for development and maintenance.

== Membership and functioning ==
=== Membership ===
- Life Members: All residential property owners in the Gulshan Model Town area and their immediate family members are eligible to become life members of the Gulshan Society paying a one-time fee and in accordance to the terms and conditions of membership. All life members have voting rights in elections and general meetings.
- Senior Members: Senior membership is offered to any individual over the age of 65 years. The rights, privileges and conditions of membership are same as life members.
- Honorary Members: Distinguished members of the community and civil society are nominated by the executive committee of Gulshan Society as honorary members. Honorary members do not pay any fee and are not entitled to voting rights in elections and general meetings.

=== Organization ===
- Executive Committee: The society is governed by an elected executive committee, the EC, that oversees all activities and decision-making processes. This committee is responsible for planning and implementing community projects, managing finances, and ensuring compliance with relevant regulations. The tenure of an elected EC is two years, and the 19-member committee is headed by its president. There are two vice presidents, a secretary general, two joint secretary general, a treasurer, a joint treasurer, five EC members, and six zonal chairmans. The members of their respective zones elect each zonal chairman.
- Zonal Committees: The territorial jurisdiction of the Gulshan Society is divided into six zones. Six zonal chairmans are elected in the executive committee by the members of their respective zones.
- Subcommittees: Various subcommittees address specific areas such as security, health, environment, and social welfare. Members of the executive committee are assigned as the chairmans of the subcommittees. Each subcommittee has a specific terms of reference to follow. The following are the subcommittees of the Gulshan Society:
1. Civic Services and Utilities
2. Community Policing and Traffic Management
3. Constitution
4. Climate Change and Environment
5. Cultural
6. Finance
7. Health and Wellness
8. Lake Management
9. Lake Park
10. Membership
11. Women and Children

== Partnerships ==
Gulshan Society often collaborates with Dhaka North City Corporation, RAJUK, Dhaka Metropolitan Police, environmental and health organizations, and private sector companies to implement community programs and initiatives.
