= Museum of Independence, Dhaka =

Museum in Dhaka, Bangladesh

Coordinates: 23.734475°N 90.398270°E

- Fountain inside the Museum of Independence
- Established: 25th March, 2015
- Location: Dhaka, Bangladesh
- Collections: History; Imagery of Bangladesh Liberation War; Struggle
- Founder: Government of Bangladesh
- Owner: Government of Bangladesh

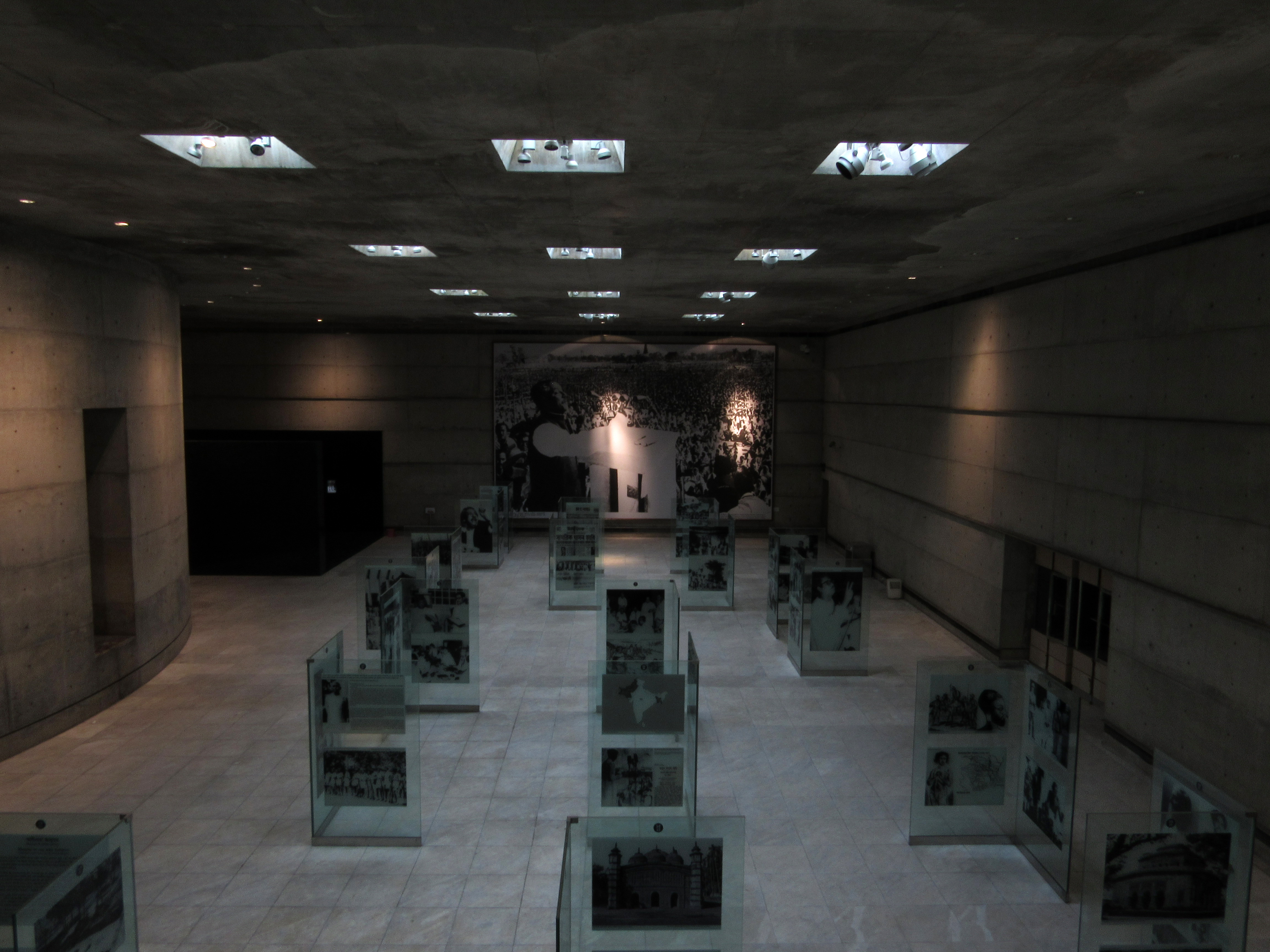
Gallery at the museum

The Museum of Independence in Dhaka, Bangladesh depicts the struggle for independence of Bangladesh. It shows the history of the nation since Mughal tenure to independence in 1971. It is the first and only underground museum in the country. The museum is part of a 67-acre complex at Suhrawardy Udyan, the site from where Sheikh Mujibur Rahman gave his historic speech declaring the struggle for independence, and where the Pakistani forces surrendered after the War of Independence. The museum was opened to public on March 25, 2015, the 45th Independence Day of Bangladesh.

== Architecture ==
The underground museum is part of a master plan that includes a multimedia projection theater, an amphitheater, three water pools, Shikha Chirantony (eternal flame) symbolizing the eternity of Bengali nationalism, a mural based on the struggle for independence and other ancillary facilities. There is also a 155-seat auditorium in the complex. The focal point in the experience of the space is the monument, Tower of Light which is a 50-meter high tower composed of stacked glass panels. The museum is situated beneath the tower of light. The museum's plaza area has a 5669 square meter of tiled floor. Its underground terrace has a fountain at the center where water is falls from over the ceiling. Bangladeshi architects Kashef Mahboob Chowdhury and Marina Tabassum won a national design competition in 1997 and subsequently they were commissioned for the project. The total construction cost of the complex was 1.75 billion tk.

== Exhibition ==
The museum has a collection of over 300 historic photographs in 144 glass panels that depict the history of Bangladesh. Terracotta, pictures and paper clippings of the war of liberation is on display at the museum. Copies of foreign newspapers and reports showing different events of war of liberation are kept in the gallery. The gallery also showcases some of the significant archaeological sites and monuments of Bangladesh. A replica of the table, where the eastern zone commander of Pakistan Army Lieutenant General Amir Abdullah Khan Niazi signed the surrender document, is kept in the gallery.

== Vandalism ==
After the fall of Sheikh Hasina's government in the face of the July Uprising, allegedly comprising supporters of Jamaat e Islami and its student wing Islami Chhatra Shibir, ransacked and vandalised the museum. They destroyed galleries, terracotta mural, office rooms and memorabilia from the museum. Original arms used during the Bangladesh Liberation War was also looted.

== Images ==
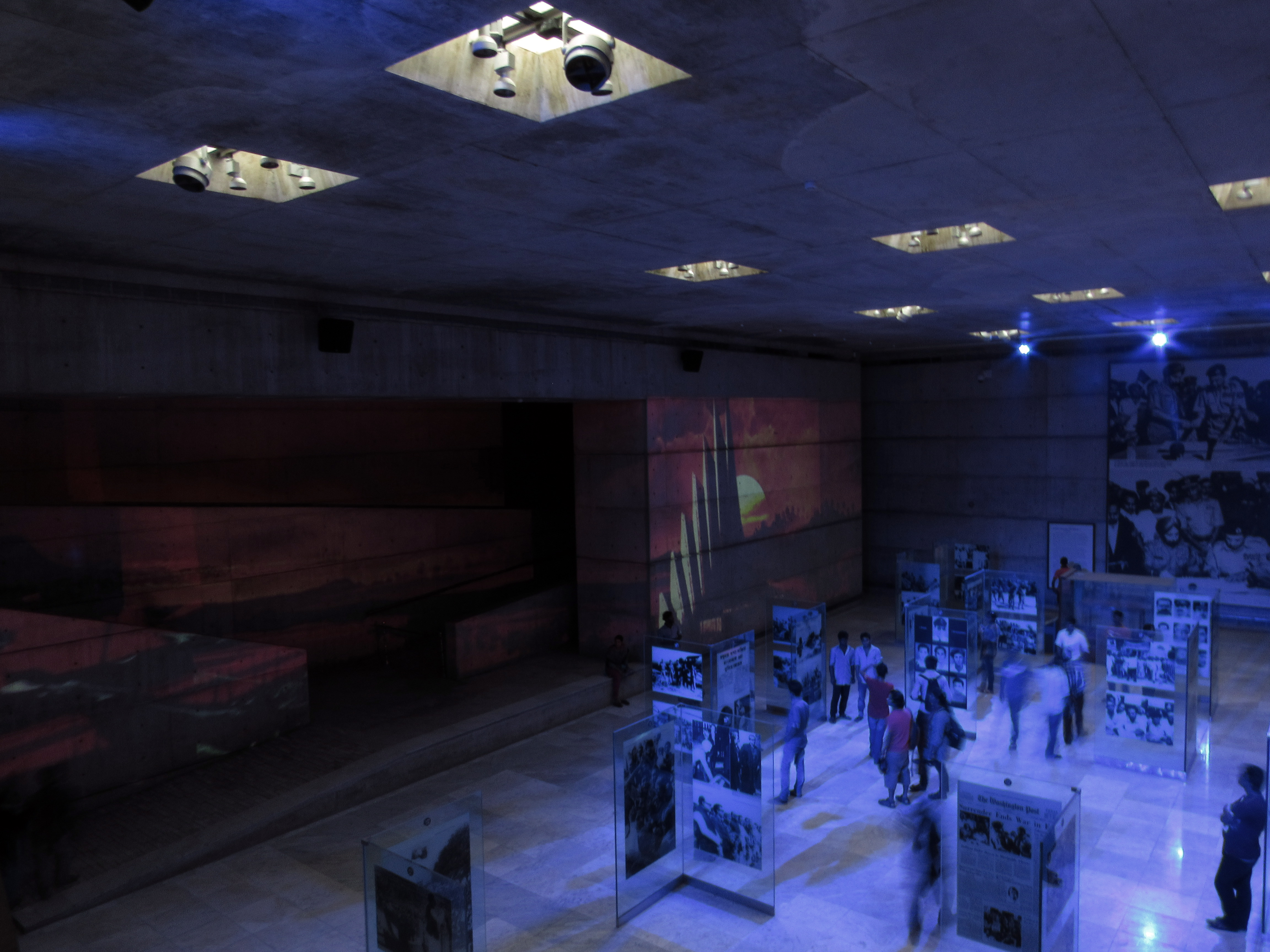
Documentary on independence of Bangladesh is being shown on the gallery wall.

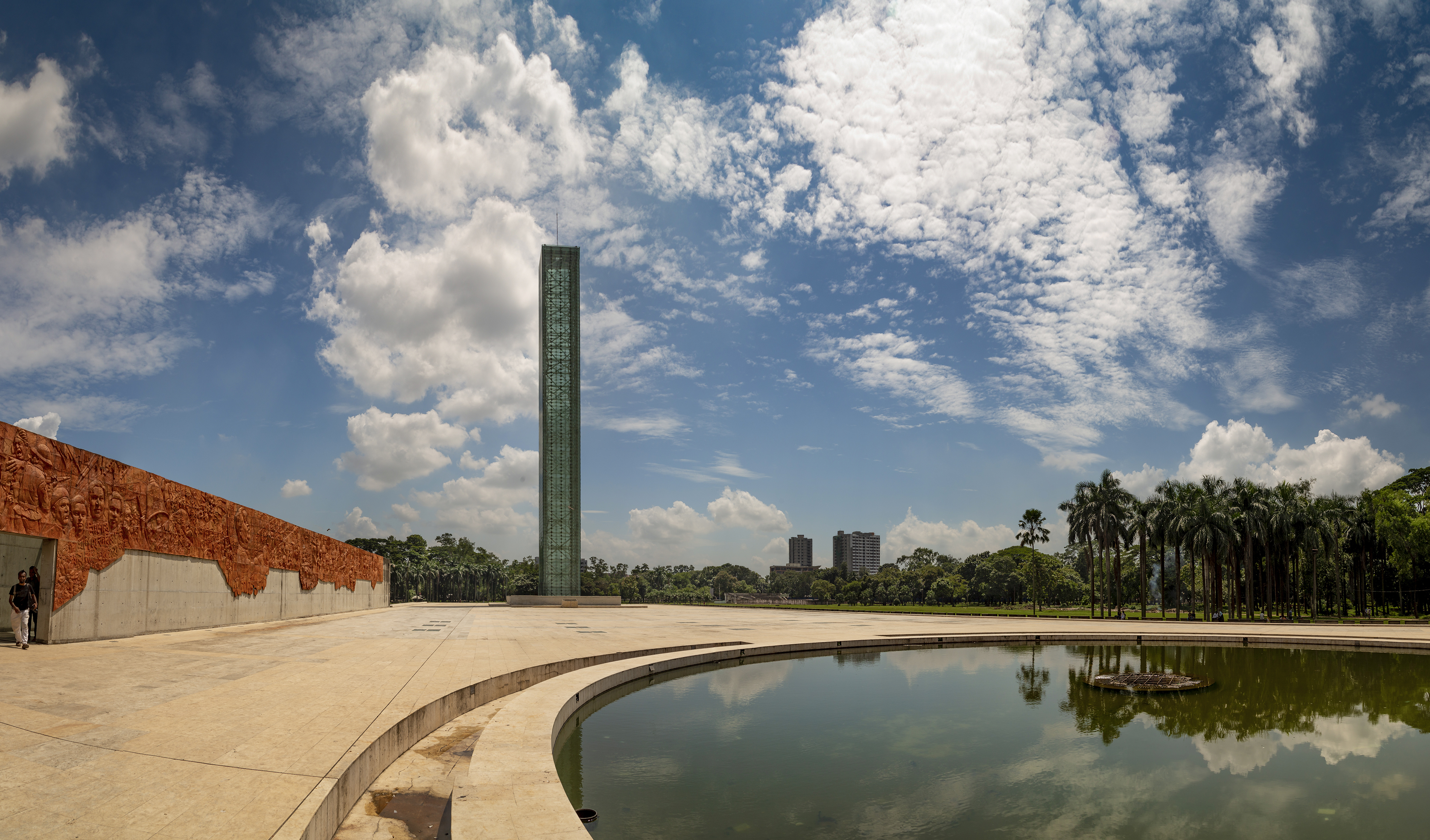
The Tower of Light is seen on the right and the mural stretching from left.

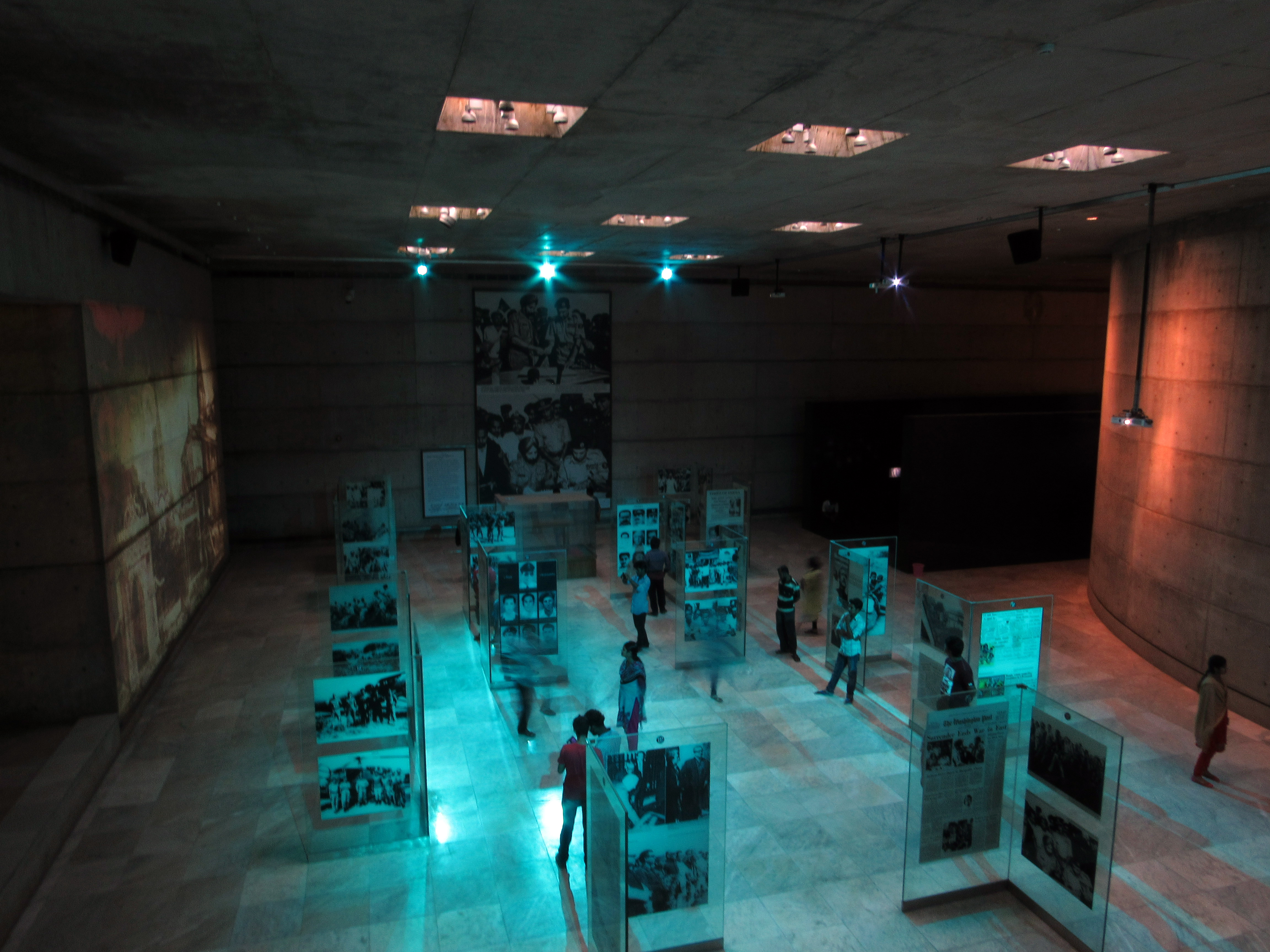
Gallery at the museum.
