= Purquil =

Purquil পুরকুইল
- Village
- Location on the map of Bangladesh
- Coordinates: 23.780757°N 91.083451°E
- Country: Bangladesh
- Division: Chattogram (Chittagong)
- District: Brahmanbaria
- Upazila: Kasba
- Union: 2 No. Mehari
- Ward: 8 No.

Government
  - Type: Local government
  - Body: Union council
  - UP Chairman: Mosharraf Hossain Morshed
  - Ward Member: Juwel Mia

Population
  - Total: 650
- Time zone: UTC+06:00 (Bangladesh Time)
- Postal code: 3460

Purquil is a village in the east-central part of Bangladesh. It is located at Mehari Union of Kasba Upazila in Brahmanbaria District of Chittagong Division.

== Demography ==
According to the 2011 census, the total population of Purquil village is about 650. All the people in the village are followers of Islam.

== Location ==
It is bounded on the east by Kheora village, on the west by Ishan Nagar village, on the north by Jamuna village and on the south by Bahar Aata and Chaubepur villages. All the villages are located in Mehari Union.

A canal called Rajar Khal flows past the village of Purkuil, and a tributary of the Titas River flows not far from the village.

== Education and culture ==
There is a Fazil madrasa in the village called "Purquil Gausia Habibia Fazil Madrasa". There are also two Hafizia madrasas.

The village of Purkuil has three mosques and two Eidgahs for the Muslim community. There are two cemeteries in the village. There is also a small market in the village.
