= Kheora =

Kheore খেওড়া
- Village
- Location on the map of Bangladesh
- Coordinates: 23.780757°N 91.083451°E
- Country: Bangladesh
- Division: Chattogram (Chittagong)
- District: Brahmanbaria
- Upazila: Kasba
- Union: 2 No. Mehari
- Ward: 7th & 8th.

Government
  - Type: Local government
  - Body: Union council
  - UP Chairman: Mosharraf Hossain Morshed
  - Ward Member: Abdur Rahim (7th Ward); Juwel Mia (8th Ward)

Population
  - Total: 3,697
- Time zone: UTC+06:00 (Bangladesh Time)
- Postal code: 3460

Kheore is a village in the east-central part of Bangladesh. It is located at Mehari Union under Kasba Upazila in Brahmanbaria District of Chittagong division. Administratively, the village is divided into Ward No. 7 and 8 of Mehari Union. The village is known as the birthplace of Hindu spiritual saint Anandamayi Ma.

== Demography ==
According to the 2011 census, the total population of Kheora village is about 3697.

== Location ==
It is bounded on the west by Purquil village, on the south-west by Bahar Aata, on the south by Bamutia and Bugir villages, on the east by Sonargaon and Deli villages and on the north-east by Pataisar village. Purquil, Bahar Aata and Bamutia are under the same union, while Bugir, Sonargaon, Deli and Pataisar are under Kharera Union.

== Notable people ==
- Abdur Rahim [bn]— Freedom fighter (Bir Bikrom) of Bangladesh Liberation War.
- Anandamayi Ma — Hindu spiritual saint.

== Education ==
There is an MPO-affiliated high school and two government primary schools in this village:

- Kheora Anandamayi High School
- Kheora Government Primary School
- Kheora East Government Primary School

== Important places ==
- Sri Sri Ma Anandamayi Ashram
- Kalibari temple.

== See also ==
- Purquil
- Anandamayi Ma
- Mehari Union
- Kasba Upazila
