= Anandamayi Ma =

Hindu saint and yoga guru (1896–1982)

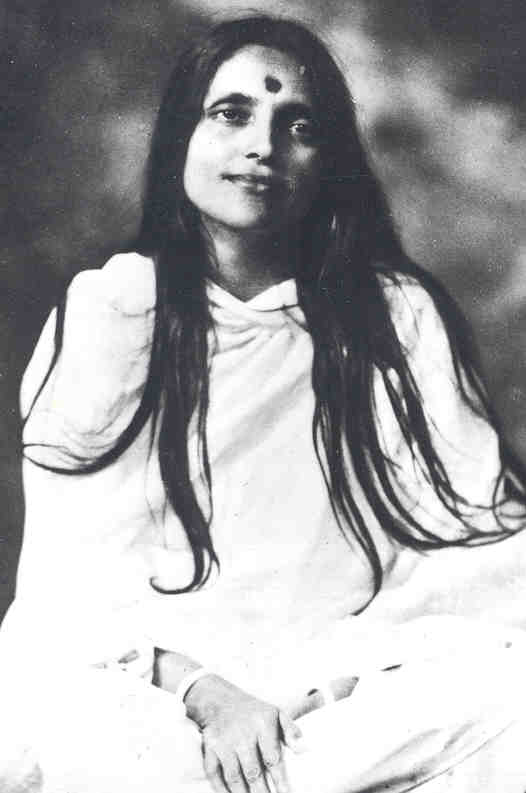
- Studio photo of Anandamayi Ma

Personal life
- Born: Nirmala Sundari; 30 April 1896 Kheora, Brahmanbaria District, Bengal Presidency, British Raj (present-day in Bangladesh)
- Died: 27 August 1982 (aged 86) Kishenpur, Dehradun, Uttarakhand, India
- Spouse: Ramani Mohan Chakrabarti

Religious life
- Religion: Hinduism
- Order: Self-realization
- Philosophy: Bhakti yoga

Anandamayi Ma (born Nirmala Sundari; 30 April 1896 – 27 August 1982) was an Indian saint, teacher, and mystic. She was revered as an incarnation of Hindu goddess Durga.

She was described by Sivananda Saraswati (of the Divine Life Society) as "la fleur la plus parfaite que le sol de l'Inde ait produite" [the most perfect flower the Indian soil has produced]. Her life was suffused in Bhakti Yoga and she was considered an epitome of "divine grace" that inspired the societal cultural milieu to lead the path of service, love and constant remembrance of the divine. Her followers experienced her spiritual attributes including precognition, faith healing and miracles. Paramahansa Yogananda translates the Sanskrit epithet Anandamayi as "Joy-permeated" in English. This name was given to her by her devotees in the 1920s to describe her perpetual state of divine joy.

== Biography ==
=== Early life ===
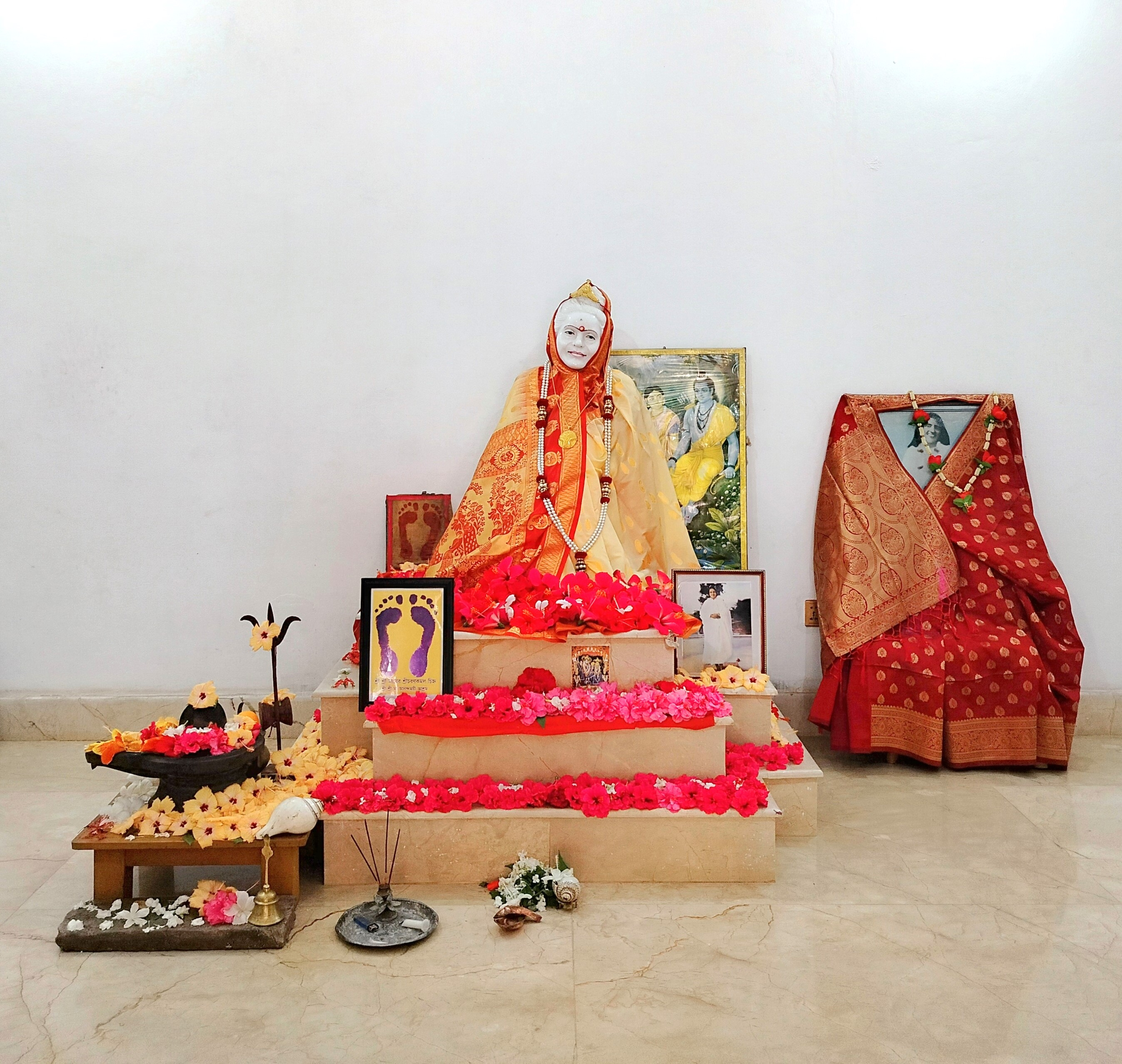
Her idol at Kheora Anandamayi Ashram

Anandamayi was born Nirmala Sundari Devi on 30 April 1896 to the orthodox Bengali Hindu Brahmin couple Bipinbihari Bhattacharya and Mokshada Sundari Devi in the village of Kheora, Tipperah District (later Brahmanbaria District), in Bengal Presidency, India. Her father, originally from Vidyakut in Tripura, was a Vaishnavite singer known for his intense devotion. Both parents were from well-regarded lineages, though the family lived in poverty. According to Nirmala Sundari, her mother gave birth to three sons, all of whom died in infancy or early childhood. Nirmala attended village schools of Sultanpur and Kheora for approximately 2–4 months. According to Anandamayi Ma's autobiographical account in "Mother Reveals Herself", the reason for her short attendance at school was that no one could accompany her on the long journey to school as her brothers had died. Although her teachers were pleased with her ability, her mother worried about her daughter's mental development because of her constantly indifferent and happy demeanour. When her mother once fell seriously ill, relatives too remarked with puzzlement about the child remaining apparently unaffected.

In 1908 at the age of 12 years and 10 months, in keeping with the rural custom at the time, she was joined by arranged marriage to Ramani Mohan Chakrabarti of Bikrampur (Munshiganj District) whom she would later rename Bholanath. She spent five years after her marriage at her brother-in-law's home, attending to housework in a withdrawn meditative state much of the time. It was at Ashtagram that a devout neighbour, Harakumar, recognised and announced her spiritual eminence, developed a habit of addressing her as "Ma", and prostrated before her morning and evening in reverence.

When Nirmala was about 17, she went to live with her husband who was working in the town of Ashtagram. Their relationship was not in accordance with social norms as it was a celibate marriage—whenever thoughts of lust occurred to Ramani, Nirmala's body would apparently take on the qualities of death. In Ashtagram Nirmala manifested symptoms of religious ecstasy for the first time in public, accompanied by extraordinary psycho-energetic and physical phenomena. Her parents were then informed by the villagers that Nirmala Sundari had become "hysterical." Her husband, however, took up her defense and reported to his in-laws that Nirmala was perfectly healthy. In 1918, the couple moved to Bajitpur, where they stayed until 1924. In this period, Nirmala Sundari continued to fall back into spiritual rapture (bhāva) while listening to kirtan. Bholanath was somewhat concerned about that as she would then often fall to the ground and sometimes take hours to return to a normal state of consciousness.

According to her spiritual biographers, from the end of 1918, Nirmala Sundari was completely absorbed in the name of God (harinām) at night, which emanated without effort and in unison with inhalation and exhalation. During this time, yogic postures (āsanas) are said to have manifested spontaneously:

"Sometimes the legs stretched of their own accord and then gradually formed themselves into the lotus position or some other body position without the help of the hands. [...] When the body became completely still and remained seated for a while, I went to sleep. The next morning when I got up early, the body felt light and from the feet to the head a wave of bliss flowed through me. Of this kind was the experience. Day and night, an overflowing light of bliss pervaded me."

On the full moon night of August 3, 1922, at midnight, twenty-six-year-old Nirmala enacted her own spiritual initiation. She explained that the ceremony and its rites were being revealed to her spontaneously as and when they were called for. Although she was uneducated in the matter, the complex rites corresponded to those of traditional, ancient Hinduism, including the offerings of flowers, the mystical diagrams (yantra) and the fire ceremony (yajna). She later stated, "As the master (guru) I revealed the mantra; as the disciple I accepted it and started to recite it."

=== Dhaka ===
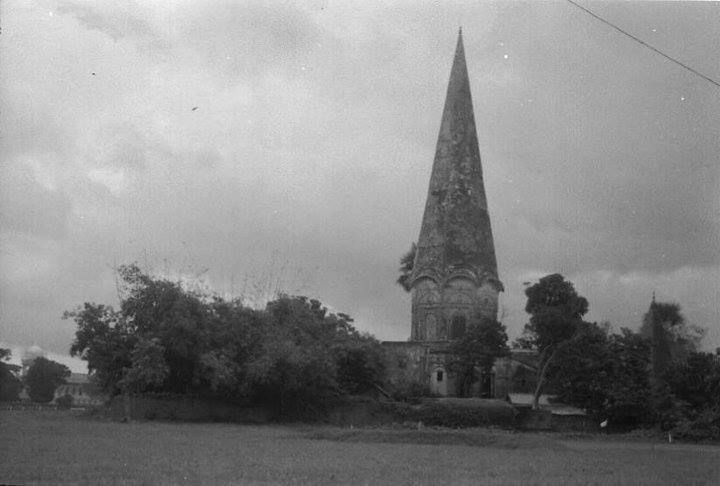
Ramna Kali Mandir in 1967

Nirmala moved to Shahbag with her husband in 1924, where he had been appointed as the caretaker of the gardens of the Nawab of Dhaka. During this period Nirmala went into ecstasies at public kirtans. Jyotiscandra Ray, known as "Bhaiji", was an early and close disciple. He was the first to suggest that Nirmala be called Anandamayi Ma, meaning "Joy Permeated Mother", or "Bliss Permeated Mother". He was chiefly responsible for the first ashram built for Anandamayi Ma in 1929 at Ramna, within the precinct of the Ramna Kali Mandir. In 1926, she reinstated a formerly abandoned ancient Kali temple in the Siddheshwari area. During the time in Shahbag, more and more people began to be drawn to what they saw to be a living embodiment of the divine.

=== Dehradun ===
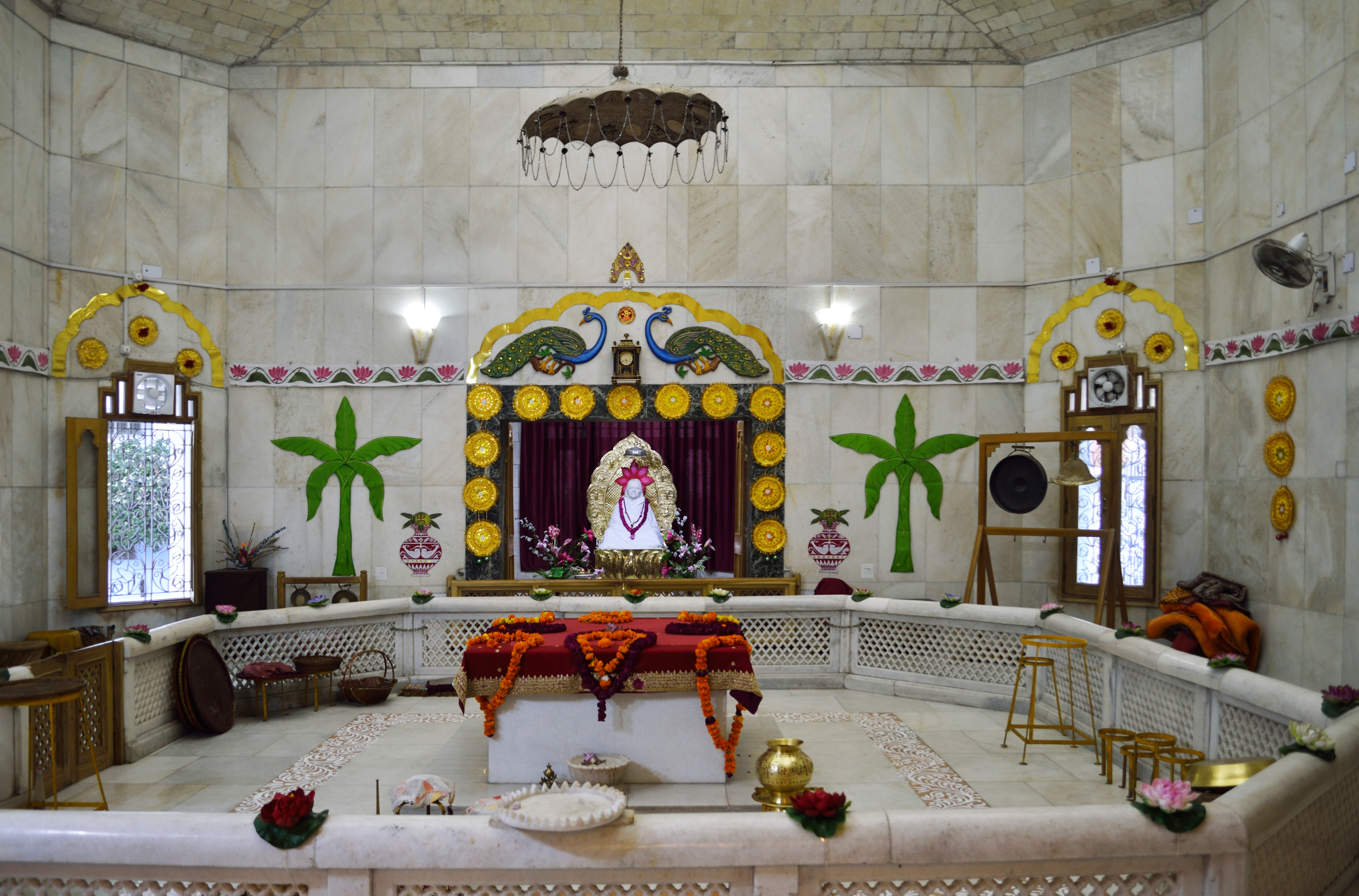
Anandamayi Ma Samadhi (foreground) at Anandamayi Ma Ashram, Haridwar (Kankhal)

After her move to Dehradun, various scholars were drawn to Anandamayi Ma's light, gift, power and message of love, though she continued to describe herself as "a little unlettered child". Prangopal Mukerjee Mahamahopadhyay Gopinath Kaviraj, Sanskrit scholar, philosopher, and principal of Government Sanskrit College in Varanasi and Triguna Sen were among her followers. Uday Shankar, the famous dance artist, was impressed by Anandamayi Ma's analysis of dance, which she used as a metaphor for the relationship between people and God. From the 1950s onwards, the establishment of an official headquarters of the "Sri Sri Ma Anandamayi Sangh" in Varanasi marked the beginning of an institutionalization process. On the foundation day of this community (Sangha), more than five thousand disciples of Anandamayi Ma participated. During this period, Anandamayi Ma also traveled to South India for the second time, where she was received by the great temples such as Sri Rangam. On the occasion of these visits to the great temples, ten thousand people gathered to see Anandamayi Ma. Furthermore, she was a contemporary of the well known Hindu saints like Udiya Baba, Sri Aurobindo, Ramana Maharshi, Swami Ramdas, Neem Karoli Baba, and Paramahansa Yogananda.

=== Death ===
Ma died on 27 August 1982 in Dehradun, and subsequently on 29 August 1982 a samadhi (shrine) was built in the courtyard of her Kankhal ashram, situated near the banks of the Ganges in Haridwar in North India.

== Teachings and public image ==
Quotation

"As you love your own body, so regard everyone as equal to your own body. When the Supreme Experience supervenes, everyone's service is revealed as one's own service. Call it a bird, an insect, an animal or a man, call it by any name you please, one serves one's own Self in every one of them."

— Ananda Varta Quarterly

Anandamayi Ma never prepared discourses, wrote down, or revised what she had said. People had difficulty transcribing her often informal talks because of their conversational speed, and Bengali use of alliterative wordplay was often lost in translation. Before audio recording equipment became widely available in India, her personal attendant Gurupriya Devi and devotee Brahmachari Kamal Bhattacharjee attempted to transcribe her speech.

Quotation

"Who is it that loves and who that suffers? He alone stages a play with Himself; who exists save Him? The individual suffers because he perceives duality. It is duality which causes all sorrow and grief. Find the One everywhere and in everything and there will be an end to pain and suffering."

=== Teachings ===
A central theme of her teaching was that "the supreme calling of every human being is to aspire to self realization. All other obligations are secondary" and "only actions that kindle man's divine nature are worthy of the name of actions". However, she did not advise everyone to become a renunciate. She would dismiss spiritual arguments and controversies by stating that "Everyone is right from his own standpoint,".

She did not give formal initiations and refused to be called a guru, as she maintained that "all paths are my paths" and "I have no particular path". She did not advocate the same spiritual methods for all and emphasized that "each person may advance according to his inborn nature", and welcomed people from many traditions, including Shaivaite, Vaishnavite, Tantric, Islam, Christianity, Judaism, Sikhism, Buddhism, and Zoroastrianism.

She taught how to live a God-centered life in the world and provided the living inspiration to enable thousands to aspire to this most noble ideal. Her style of teaching included jokes, songs and instructions on everyday life along with long discourses, silent meditation and recommended reading of scriptures.

=== Public image ===
Anandamayi Ma was understood by her followers as the embodiment of Bliss, as a healer, and as the incarnation of the goddess Kali. She has active disciples in India today. The Muslim population of Kheora refer to her as "our own Ma". Blanc Schlamm, who was initiated as Atmananda in 1962 by Anandamayi Ma, helped translate Anandamayi Ma's teachings for a wider audience.

She frequently referred to herself in the third person as either "this body" or "this little girl", which is a common spiritual practice in Hinduism in order to detach oneself from Ego.

Paramhansa Yogananda wrote about her in his book Autobiography of a Yogi. His meeting with her is recounted in the chapter titled "The Bengali 'Joy-Permeated Mother'", where she explains her background:

"Father, there is little to tell." She spread her graceful hands in a deprecatory gesture. "My consciousness has never associated itself with this temporary body. Before I came on this earth, Father, I was the same. As a little girl, I was the same. I grew into womanhood, but still I was the same. When the family in which I had been born made arrangements to have this body married, I was the same... And, Father, in front of you now, I am the same. Ever afterward, though the dance of creation change around me in the hall of eternity, I shall be the same."

=== Legacy ===
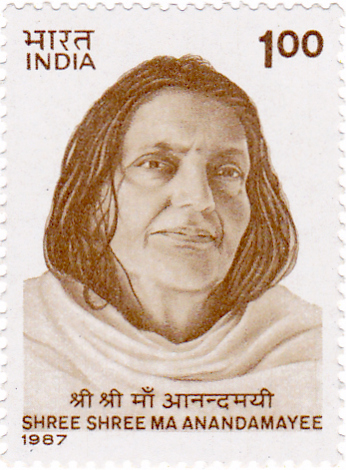
Anandamayi Ma on a 1987 Indian stamp

The Shree Shree Anandamayee Sangha in Varanasi publishes Amrit Varta, a quarterly containing her teaching, in English, Hindi, Gujarati and Bengali. The Sri Sri Anandamayi Sangha in Haridwar organizes the annual Samyam Mahavrata congregation to devote a week to collective meditation, religious discourse and devotional music. A few excerpts are noted below:

- “With earnestness, love and goodwill carry out life’s everyday duties and try to elevate yourself step by step. In all human activities let there be a live contact with the Divine and you will not have to leave off anything. Your work will then be done well and you will be on the right track to find the Master."
- "Whatever work you have to do, do it with a singleness of purpose, with all the simplicity, contentment and joy you are capable of. Thus only will you be able to reap the best fruit of work. In fullness of time, the dry leaves of life will naturally drop off and new ones shoot forth.”
- "“Your earthly pension expires with your life, but the divine pension continues long, long after death."
- "If you cannot do anything else, at least morning and evening at the appointed time, lay down your body, mind and life before Him in salutation and surrender, and think of Him just a little.”

== See also ==
- Bhakti yoga
- Ravi Shankar

== Bibliography ==
- Banerjee, Shyamananda (1973). A Mystic Sage: Ma Anandamayi: Ma Anandamayi. s.n.
- Bhaiji (1975). Sad Vani: A Collection of the Teaching of Sri Anandamayi Ma. translated by Swami Atmananda. Shree Shree Anandamayee Charitable Society.
- Bhaiji. Matri Vani — From the Wisdom of Sri Anandamayi Ma. translated by Swami Atmananda.
- Chaudhuri, Narayan (1986). That Compassionate Touch of Ma Anandamayee. Delhi: Motilal Banarsidass. ISBN 81-208-0204-7.
- Datta, Amulya Kumar. In Association with Sri Ma Anandamayi.
- Fitzgerald, Joseph; Alexander Lipski (2007). The Essential Sri Anandamayi Ma: Life and Teaching of a 20th Century Indian Saint. World Wisdom. ISBN 978-1-933316-41-3.
- Ganguli, Anil. Anandamayi Ma the Mother Bliss-incarnate.
- Ganguly, Adwaita P (1996). Yuga-Avatar Sri Sri Ma Anandamayee and Universal Religion. VRC Publications. ISBN 81-87530-00-6.
- Giri, Gurupriya Ananda. Sri Ma Anandamayi.
- Joshi, Hari Ram (1999). Ma Anandamayi Lila, Memoirs of Hari Ram Joshi. Kolkata: Shree Shree Anandamayee Charitable Society.
- Kaviraj, Gopinath (1967). Mother as Seen by Her Devotees. Varanasi: Shree Shree Anandamayee Sangha.
- Lipski, Alexander (1983). Life and Teachings of Sri Anandamayi ma. Orient Book Distributors.
- Maschmann, Melita (2002). Encountering Bliss: My Journey Through India with Anandamayi Ma. trans. S.B. Shrotri. Delhi: Motilal Banarsidass. ISBN 81-208-1541-6.
- Mukerji, Bithika (1998). A Bird on the Wing — Life and Teachings of Sri Ma Anandamayi. Sri Satguru Publications. ISBN 81-7030-577-2.
- Mukerji, Bithika (2002). My Days with Sri Ma Anandamayi. India: Indica Books. ISBN 81-86569-27-8.
- Mukerji, Bithika (1970). From the Life of Sri Anandamayi Ma. India: Sri Sri Anandamayi Sangha, Varanasi.
- Ramananda, Swami (2002). Bliss Now: My Journey with Sri Anandamayi Ma. India: Select Books. ISBN 978-1-59079-019-9.
- Ray, J. Mother As Revealed To Me, Bhaiji.
- Yogananda, Paramhansa (1946). Autobiography of a Yogi. New York: Philosophical Library.
