= Ramna massacre =

1971 Massacre in East Pakistan

Coordinates: 23.73°N 90.40°E

Ramna massacre রমনা গণহত্যা
- Part of Bangladesh genocide
- Location: Ramna, Dhaka, Bangladesh
- Date: 27 March 1971
- Target: Bengali Hindus
- Attack type: Mass murder, massacre
- Deaths: c. 250
- Perpetrator: Pakistani Army

The Ramna massacre (Bengali: রমনা গণহত্যা) was the slaughter of Bengali Hindus who lived in the area around the Ramna Kali Temple in East Pakistan by the Pakistani army on the night of 27 March 1971. It is estimated that around 250 Hindus were killed in the massacre.

== Background ==
The village around the Ramna Kali temple was an ancient Hindu settlement at the centre of the Dhaka Race Course. It was inhabited by around 250 Hindu men, women and children.

John E. Rohde of USAID, who visited the place on 29 March, witnessed charred corpses of men, women and children who had been killed by machine guns and then set on fire. The Pakistani army doused the temple with petrol and gunpowder and set it on fire, along with around 50 cows. 101 Hindus including the priest of the Ramna Kali temple were killed.

== Memorial ==
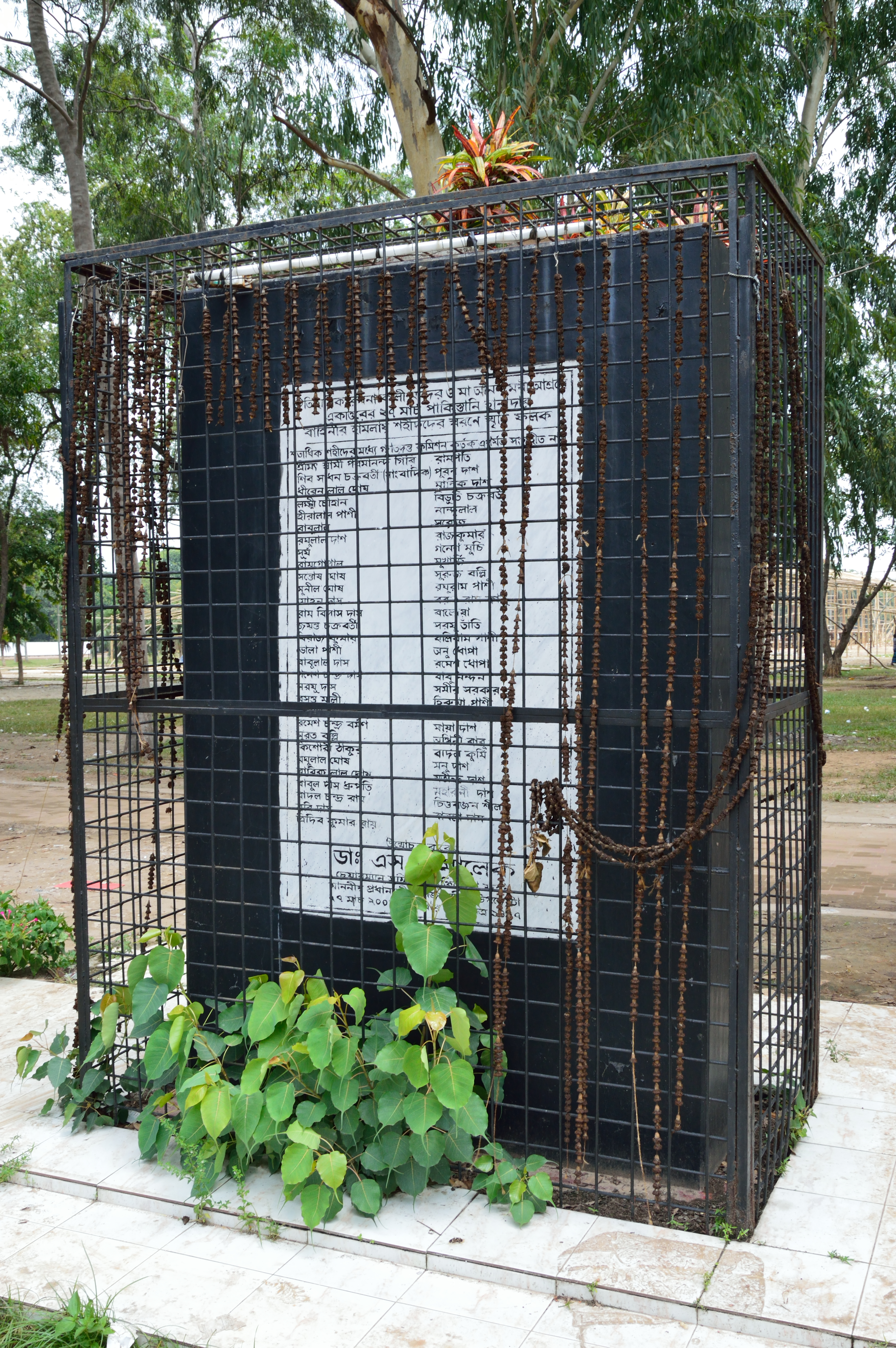
Memorial of the victims

A memorial in front of the makeshift temple lists the names of 69 persons killed in the massacre. On 27 March 2011, a memorial service was held in the compound of the Ramna Kali temple in honour of the victims of the Ramna massacre.
