= Shahid Zia Shishu Park =

Children's amusement park in Dhaka

Shahid Zia Shishu Park, Dhaka; শহীদ জিয়া শিশু পার্ক, ঢাকা
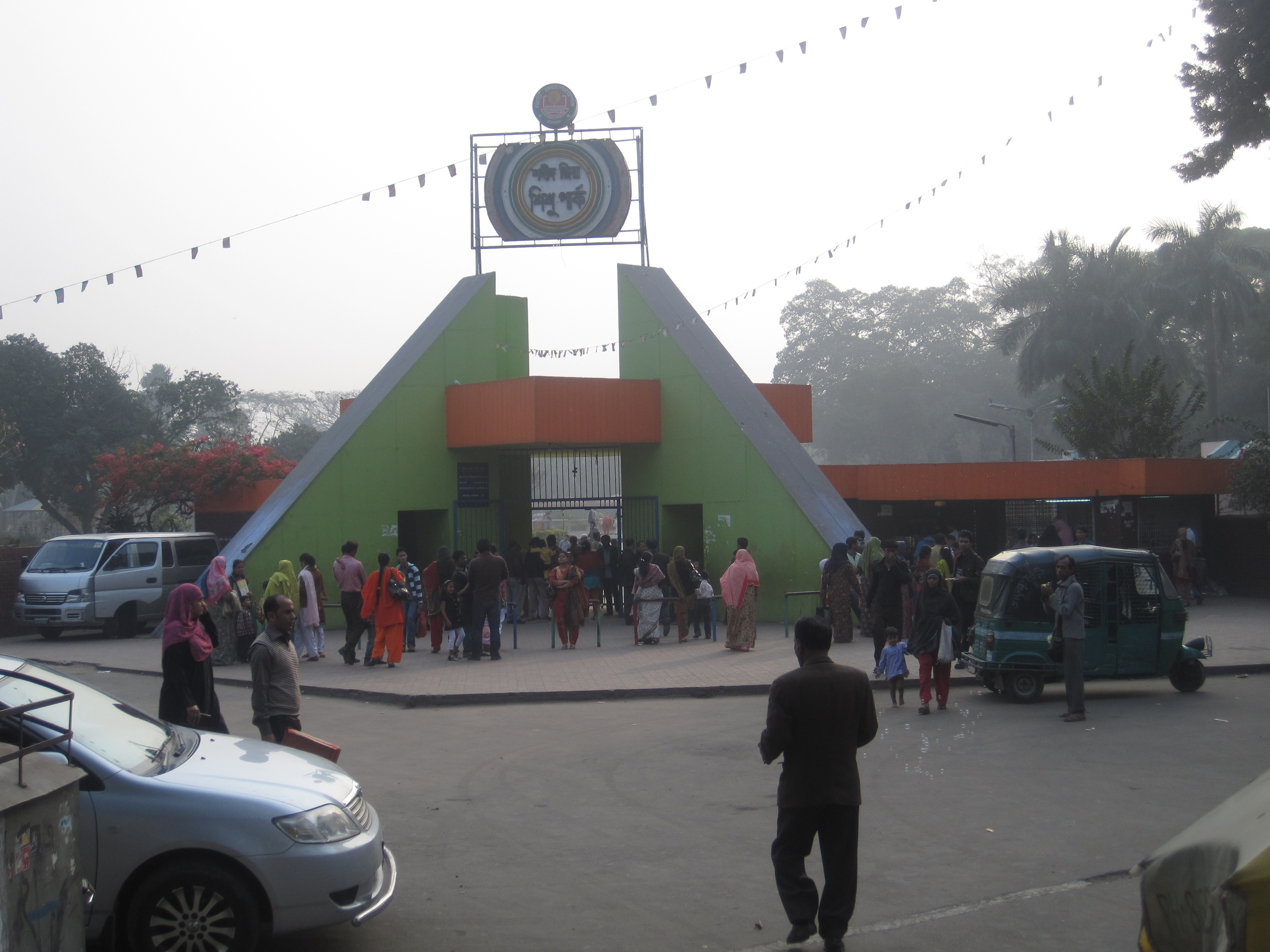
- Main entrance of the Shahid Zia Shishu Park, Dhaka
- Interactive map of: Shahid Zia Shishu Park, Dhaka; শহীদ জিয়া শিশু পার্ক, ঢাকা
- Location: Shahbag, Dhaka
- Coordinates: 23°44′12″N 90°23′52″E
- Opened: 1979
- Operated by: Dhaka South City Corporation
- Area: 15.00 acres (6.07 ha)

The Shahid Zia Shishu Park (Bengali: শহীদ জিয়া শিশু পার্ক) also known as Dhaka Shishu Park is one of the many children's amusement parks in Dhaka City along with many other privately operated entertainment parks and amusement centres in Dhaka. It is located in the Shahbag area of Dhaka City in Bangladesh. The Bengali name 'Shishu Park' translates to 'Children's Park' in English. The Shishu Park is closed to visitors and the public at the moment, due to ongoing expansion, modernisation and renovation work, including a large underground car park, additional rides, etc.

Established in 1979 on 15 acres (6.1 ha) of land, it is the first children's amusement park in independent Bangladesh. It was established under Bangladesh Parjatan Corporation, the Bangladesh government owned tourism promotion agency, by the initiatives of the then President Ziaur Rahman with the aim of creating a "healthy recreational facility for children". It is now maintained by Dhaka South City Corporation as an inexpensive entertainment park for children since 1983.

The many rides of the park include including a wheel train, a merry-go-round and a number of wheel-based rides. Bangladesh Air Force donated a fighter jet in 1992. The cheapest of all entertainment parks in Dhaka, charging a nominal fee of only BDT 10.00 for entry and 10.00 for each ride, it attracts over six thousand visitors a day. During the Eid-ul-Fitr holidays the number of visitors reaches up to three hundred and fifty thousand. The City Corporation earns about BDT 200 million annually from the park. The park is open Monday through Thursday and Saturday from 2:00 pm to 7:00 pm. On Fridays, it is open from 2:30 pm to 7:30 pm.

Renovation works are in schedule for the entire park due to some of the rides deteriorating in condition through time. As of 2007, a City Corporation plan to revamp the park for BDT 9 billion waits for approval of the Ministry for Local Government and Rural Development. The plan includes an expansion of the area to 19 acres (7.7 ha) and adding multiple new rides besides reinstalling the old rides. At present, the Shishu Park is closed to visitors and the public due to ongoing modernisation and renovation work.

After the fall of the Sheikh Hasina-led Awami League government in August 2024, the name of Dhaka Shishu Park was changed to its former name, Shahid Zia Shishu Park.

== Gallery ==
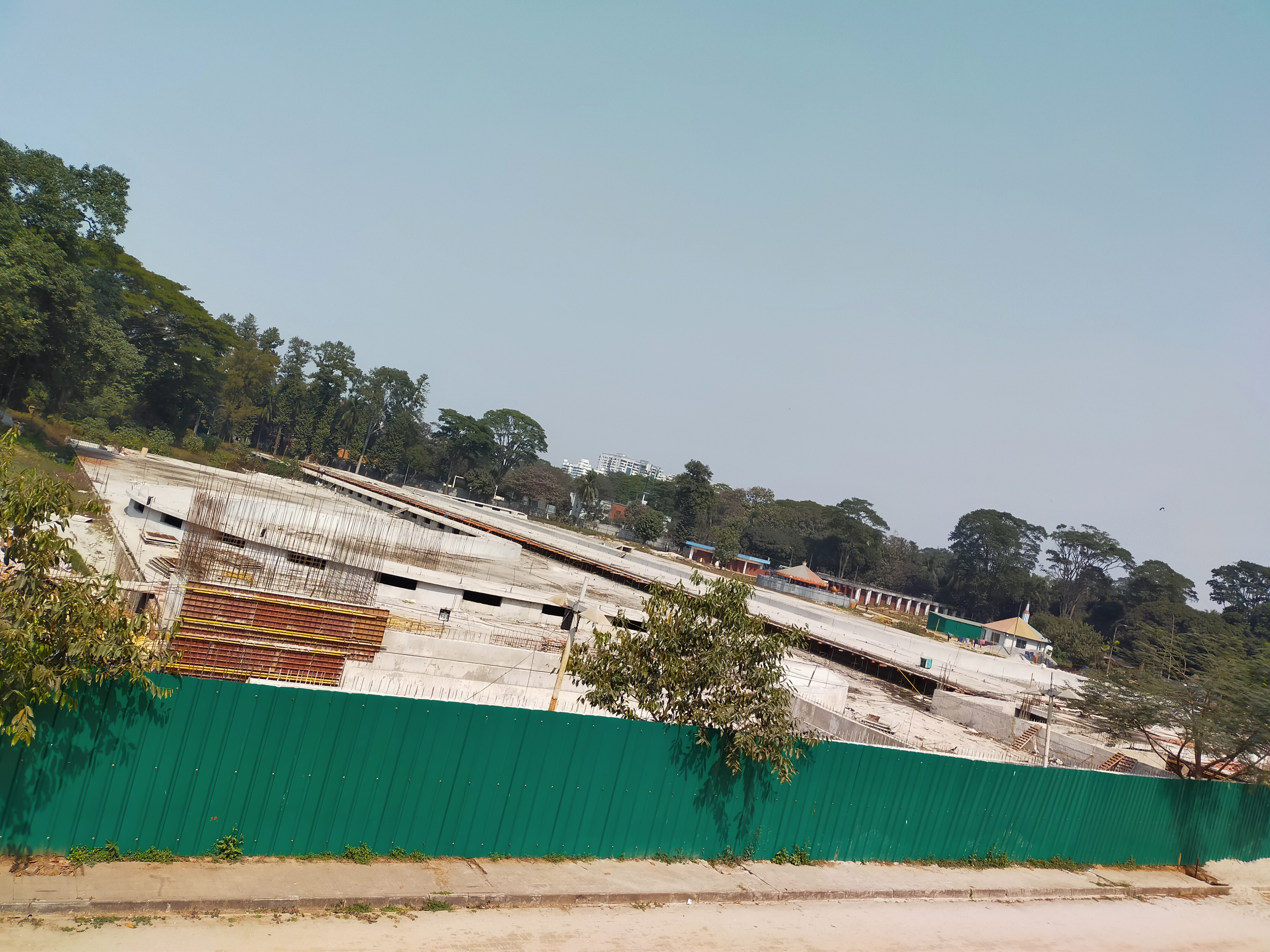
Renovation work is ongoing in Dhaka Shishu Park
