= Institute of Modern Languages, University of Dhaka =

Bangladeshi research institute

Institute of Modern Languages
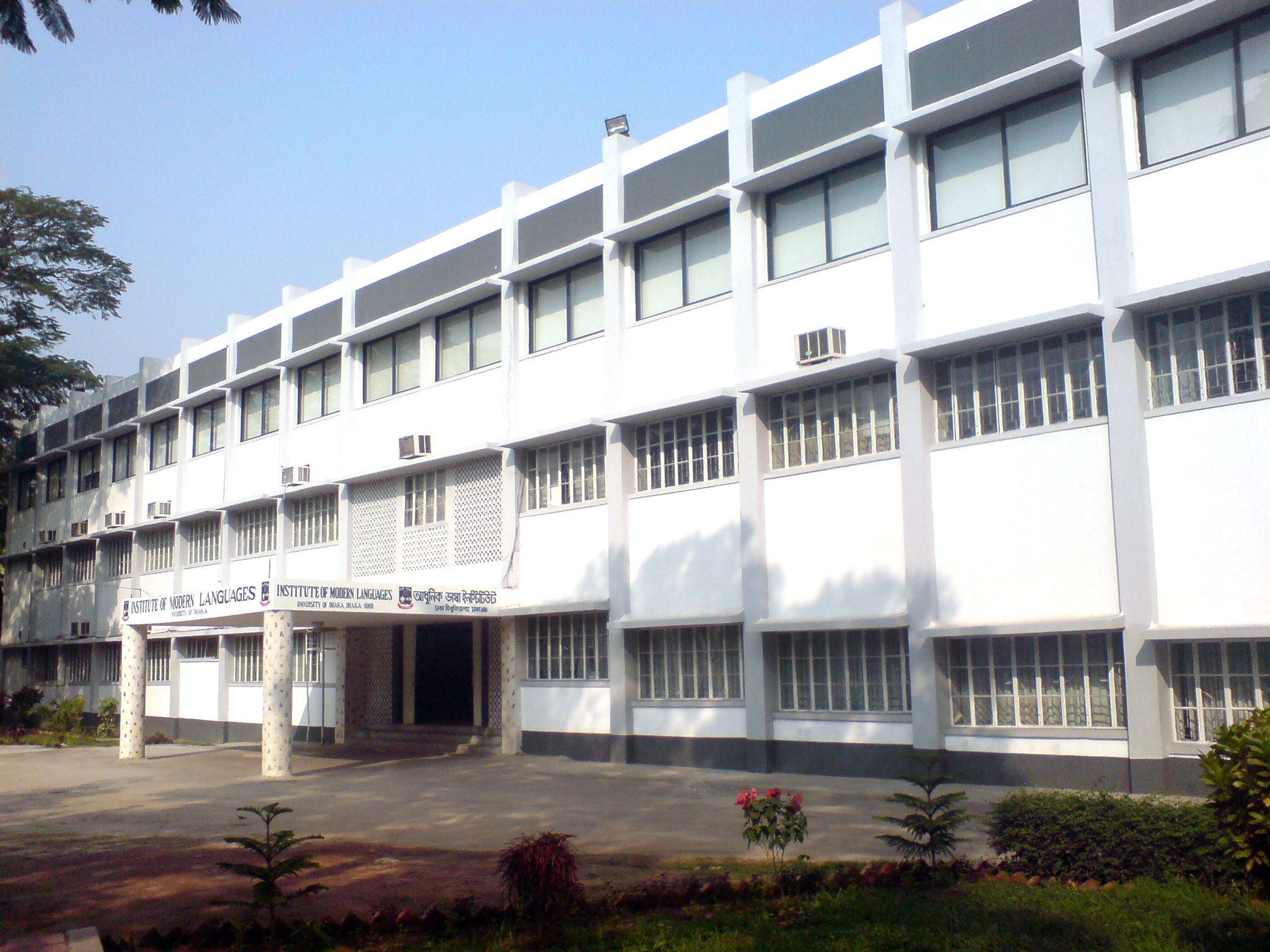
- Institute of Modern Languages, Dhaka University
- Established: 19 July 1974; 52 years ago
- Focus: Modern languages
- Director: Dr. Razaul karim Faquire
- Adjunct faculty: Rokeya Hall
- Formerly called: Department of Foreign Languages (1964)
- Address: Nilkhet Road, University of Dhaka, Dhaka 1000
- Location: Shahbag, Dhaka, Bangladesh
- Coordinates: 23.733589°N 90.394110°E
- Interactive map of Institute of Modern Languages
- Website: Official site

The Institute of Modern Languages (IML) is an institute of the University of Dhaka in Bangladesh dedicated to teaching various modern languages including Bengali, English, French, German, Russian, Spanish, Italian, Arabic, Persian, Turkish, Mandarin Chinese, Japanese, Korean, and Hindi. Four levels of certificate courses are offered for each language, Bengali being the only language exclusively reserved for foreign international students. B.A Honours programs in English, French, Mandarin Chinese and Japanese have been recently added to the curriculum, where an additional Masters program was added to the English curriculum. For junior courses, a student must obtain at least G.P.A. 2.5 in higher secondary exam. For upper certificate courses, he must pass admission test. Anyone passing DU admission test from B unit will be eligible to enroll for honours courses.

== History ==
In July 1947, the Department of International Relations was established at the University of Dhaka.

On the first of July 1974 the Institute of Modern Languages was established as an integral part of University of Dhaka, incorporating the Department of Foreign Languages of 1964 into its constitution.

In recent years the number of students has been declining. However the Korean language department was expanded in 2014.
