= Mehari Union =

Place in Chittagong Division, Bangladesh

Mehari Union মেহারী ইউনিয়ন
- 2 no. Mehari Union Parishad
- Location within Bangladesh
- Coordinates: 23°46.5′N 91°4′E
- Country: Bangladesh
- Division: Chittagong Division
- District: Brahmanbaria District
- Upazila: Kasba Upazila
- Time zone: UTC+6 (Bangladesh Standard Time)
- Postal code: 3460

Mehari (Bengali: মেহারী ইউনিয়ন) is a union of Kasba Upazila in the Brahmanbaria District of Bangladesh.

== Area ==
Mehari Union covers an area of 5,450 acres (22.08 km^{2}).

== Location and boundaries ==
Mehari Union is located in the north-western part of Kasba Upazila. It is bounded on the south by Kuti Union, on the east by Kasba West Union and Kharera Union, on the north-east by Badair Union, on the north by Mulgram Union and Kaitola South Union of Nabinagar Upazila and Andikot Union of Muradnagar Upazila of Comilla District.

== Demographics ==
According to the 2011 Bangladesh census, the total population of Mehari Union is 26,335. Of these, 12,179 are males and 14,158 are females. The total number of households is 5,016. The population density is about 1,194 people per square kilometer. The village-based population of this union is mentioned below:

Ward No.	village	Population (2011)
1st Ward	Ishan Nagar	1,250
1st Ward	Jamuna	1,887 people
2nd Ward	Mehari	3,718
3rd Ward	Vallabhpur	1,390
4th Ward	Shimrail Satpara	3,296
5th Ward	Shimrail Madhyapara	3,944
8th Ward	Shimrail Uttarpara	2,926 people
8th Ward	Kheora East	2,000 people
8th Ward	Bamutia	643 people
8th Ward	Purquil	650 people
8th Ward	Bahar Aata	1,012
8th Ward	Kheora Paschimpara	1,698
9th Ward	Choubepur	2,565

== History ==
Mehari, a village in Brahmanbaria district of Bangladesh is a traditional ancient village of Mehari Union or Kasba Upazila. Even before the partition of the country in 1947, hundreds of years old buildings and archeological monuments were found here, which were lost due to disrespect and neglect.

It is believed that a wealthy merchant named Mihir Chandra lived here during the reign of the Sen dynasty. People from nearby villages used to call his house "Mihir Bari" (Mihir's house). The name "Mihir Bari" later changed the word of mouth (Mihir Bari> Mehar Bari> Mehari) to Mehari.

According to another source, the people of these three villages of Mehari, Barni and Kalsar belonged to the same family at one time. It is known that Mehari Khan, Varun Khan and Kalon Khan were named after three persons of the same family; It is said that Varni was named after Varun Khan and Kalsar was named after Kalon Khan.

There is a traditional Kali temple in the village of Mehari. Every year a grand ceremony is held here at the puja of the traditional religious community and a fair is held at Bat tala. According to the name of this Mehari Kali Temple, the then Chairman Lalu Gonsai named the Parishad as Mehari Union Parishad.

== Administrative structure ==
Mehari Union is No.2 Union Parishad (Union council) under Kasba Upazila. Administrative activities of this union are under Kasba Upazila. This union is a part of Brahmanbaria-4 constituency No. 247 of the Jatiya Sangsad.

The villages of this union are:

1. Purquil
2. Mehari
3. Kheora
4. Jamuna
5. Bahar Aata
6. Ishan Nagar
7. Choubeypur
8. Bamutia
9. Shimrail
10. Vallabhpur

=== Office ===
The office of this union is located in Ishan Nagar village in ward 1. The Union Parishad (council) office is an "L"-shaped two-storey building.

== Education ==
According to the 2011 census, Mehari Union has an average literacy rate of 47.4%.

=== Institutions ===
- Purquil Gausia Habibia Fazil Madrasa
- Meheri Obadia Fazil Madrasa
- Kheora Ma Anandamoyee High School
- Kheora Government Primary School
- Jamuna Government Primary School
- Ishan Nagar Government Primary School
- Chaubepur Government Primary School

== Canals and rivers ==
- Rajar khal. (King's canal)
- Oder khal.
- Boro khal.

== Village markets ==
- Kheora market
- Jamuna Bazar
- Purquil Market
- Mehari Bazar
- Shimrail Bazaar
