= Villages of Bangladesh =

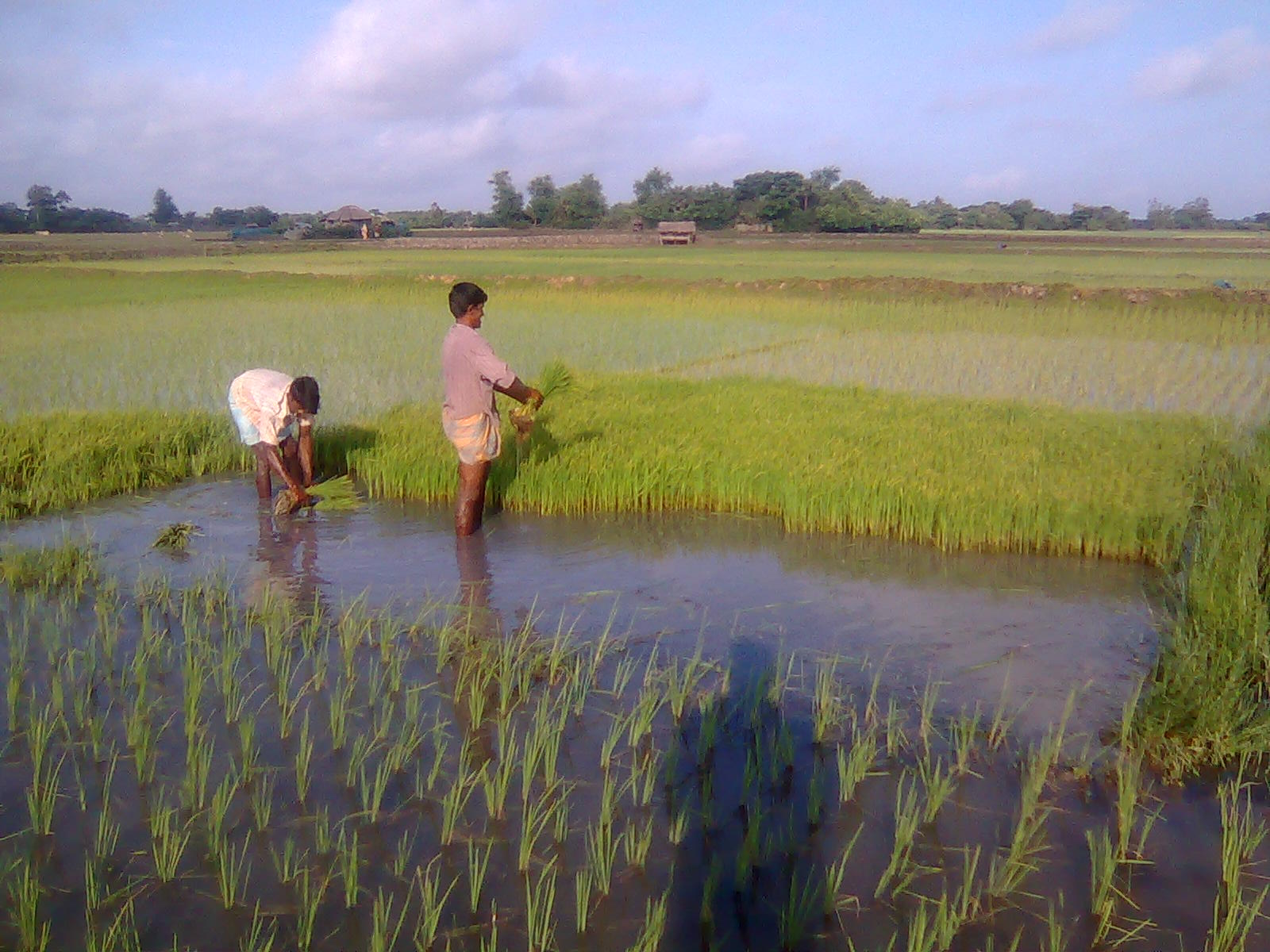
Agricultural activity in Bangladeshi village. This photo is taken from Satkhira District.

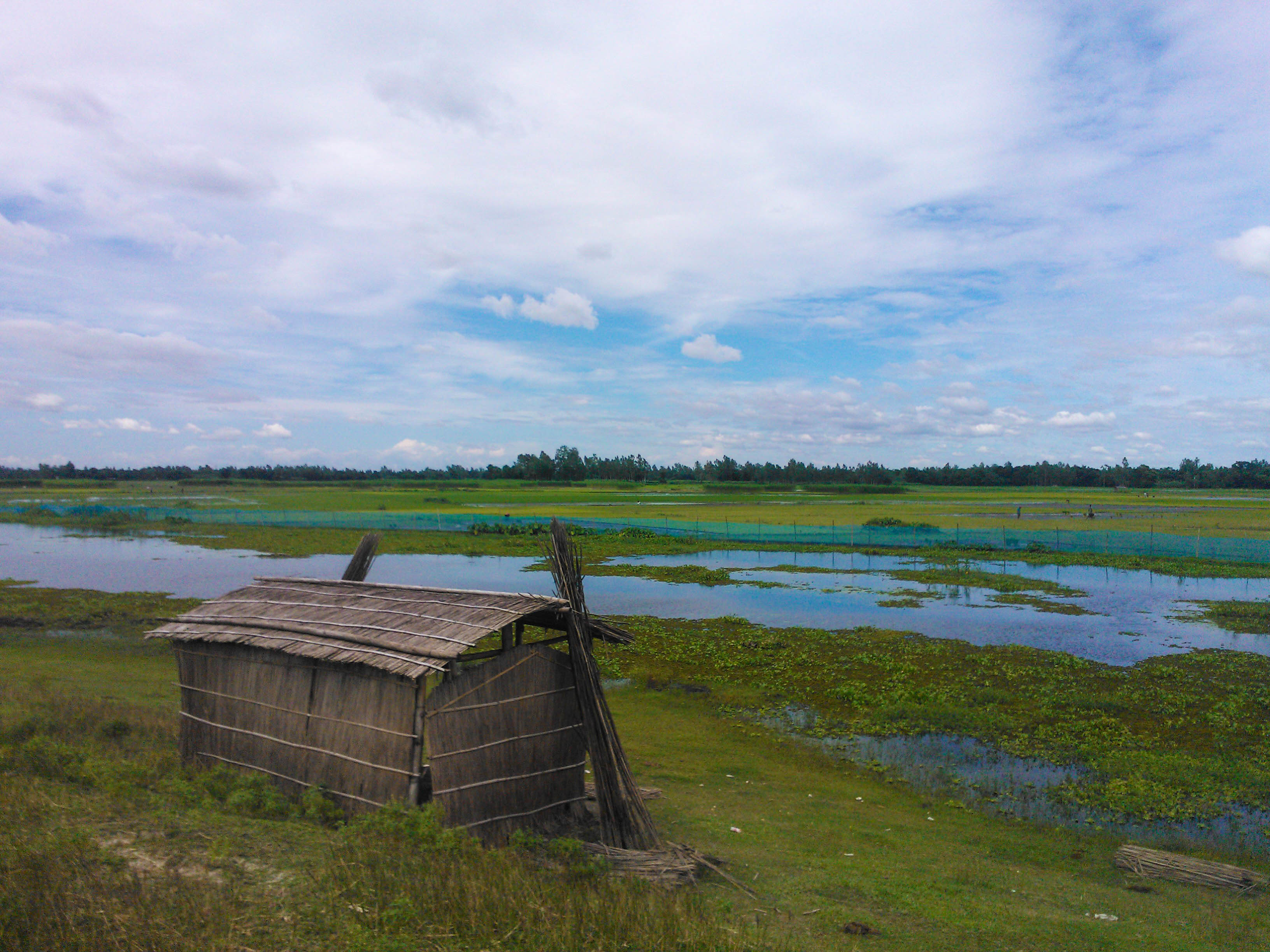
Countryside view of Bangladesh. This photo is taken from Jamalpur District.

In Bangladesh, a village is the smallest territorial and social unit for administrative and representative purposes. It is an elective unit of a Union Council from which a single council member is elected. Usually one village is designated as a ward and each union is made up of nine villages.

At the 1991 census, there were 68,038 villages in Bangladesh with an average of 232 households. The rural areas of Bangladesh (i.e. villages) are characterized by higher growth rate of population and lower literacy rate compared to urban areas - but these gaps are decreasing.

After independence, the villages in Bangladesh were underdeveloped in terms of infrastructure and economic activity. Traditional manual process driven agriculture used to be the predominant economic activity. However, the ingenuity and vitality demonstrated by the people is gradually driving the villages towards economic progress.

== See also ==
- Upazilas of Bangladesh
- List of cities and towns in Bangladesh
- List of villages in Bangladesh
- Mouza
- Wards of Bangladesh
