= Ramna Kali Temple =

Hindu temple in Dhaka, Bangladesh

Coordinates: 23.7307°N 90.3996°E

- রমনা কালী মন্দির
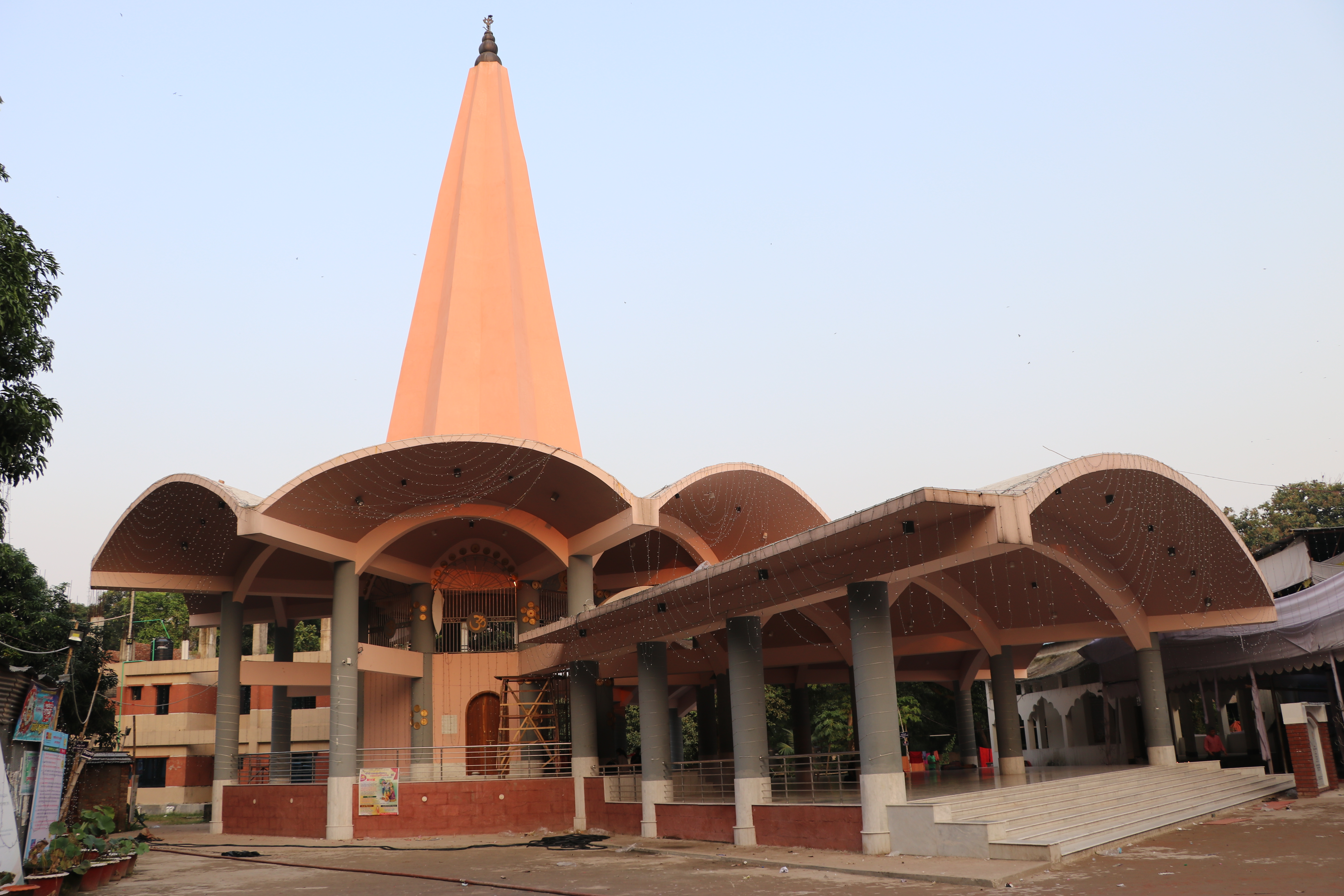

- Location within Bangladesh

Religion
- Affiliation: Hinduism
- District: Dhaka
- Deity: Kali

Location
- Country: Bangladesh

Architecture
- Creator: Rani Vilasmani Devi (last major developer)
- Established: 16th-century

Specifications
- Height (max): 120 ft
- Site area: 2.25 acres (9,100 m2)

The Ramna Kali Temple (Bengali: রমনা কালী মন্দির) is a Hindu temple in Dhaka, Bangladesh, that was originally built during the Mughal Empire. It was also known as the "Ramna Kalibari". The temple is dedicated to the Hindu Goddess Kali.

== Location ==
It is beside the former Dhaka Racecourse, now Suhrawardy Udyan. The entire temple complex occupies almost 2.25 acres (9,100 m^{2}) and is on the south side of Ramna Park, opposite the Bangla Academy.

== History ==
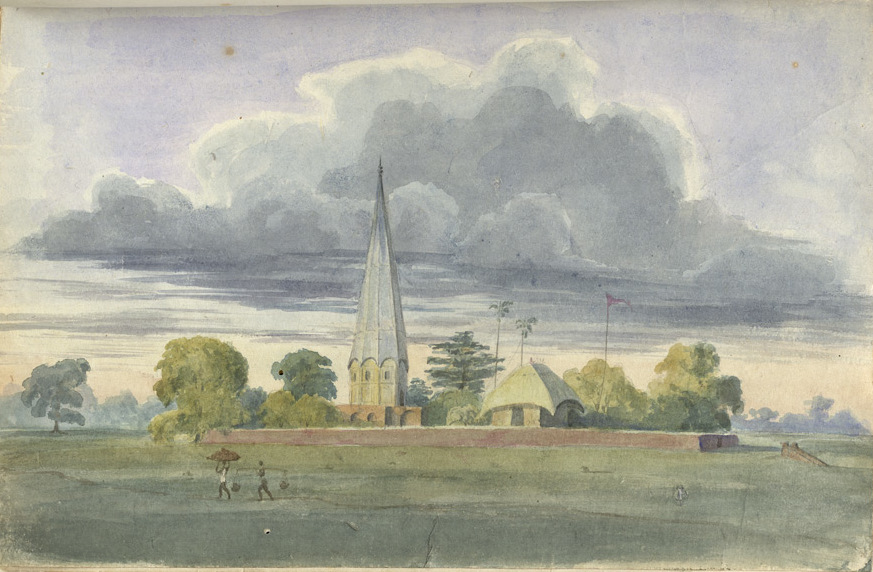
A water-colour drawing of the temple in 1833

The original temple was destroyed on 27 March 1971, by the Pakistani Army during the Bangladesh Liberation War. It was the site of a massacre of mostly Hindu people. In Nepalese folklore, the Ramna Kali Temple was founded by the devotees of the Goddess Kali. It is believed that the devotees had come to Bengal from the Himalayas.

Although the temple had stood for centuries, it was largely developed in the early 20th century. The temple was developed under the patronage of Rani Bilashmoni Debi, wife of Rajendra Narayan (1882–1913). A preliminary report finds that the peak of the temple stood at 120 feet, likely making it one of the tallest buildings in the region during the early 20th century.

== Design ==
The architectural design of the temple changed over the centuries. In front of the temple was a large dighi (pool) which was a popular place for worshipers and visitors to swim. The temple has a tall shikhara (tower). Next to the temple was the Ma Anandamoyee Ashram, a place of worship with a residential complex and facilities for washing.

The design of the temple is documented in pictures taken at Sheikh Mujibur Rahman's address of 7 March 1971. This is likely the last time the temple was photographed by journalists or historians.

== Demolition and genocide by the Pakistani Army ==
On 25 March 1971, in the night, the Pakistan Army launched "Operation Searchlight" in order to suppress a Bengali nationalist movement in what was then East Pakistan. The operation triggered a genocide and the Bangladesh Liberation War. Most of the targets of Operation Searchlight were young Hindu men, intellectuals, students and academics. Operation Searchlight focused on prominent Hindu sites including the Jagannath Hall (a hostel for Hindu students on the Dhaka University campus) and the Ramna Kali Mandir.

On 27 March 1971, the Pakistan Army entered the Ramna Kali Mandir complex and, within one hour, killed more than 100 people. Several Muslims who had sought refuge in the temple complex were also killed.

Until 2000, accounts of the demolition of the temple relied largely on the oral testimony of survivors of and witnesses. In 2000, the Awami League, the governing political party, opened a public enquiry. In September 2000, the chairman Justice KM Sobhan, presented a preliminary report.

Only around 50 victims of the massacre have been identified. Relatives of the other victims are either deceased or have left Bangladesh. A worldwide appeal has been made for any surviving relatives of the Ramna Kali Mandir massacre victims to contribute names of their deceased family members to be listed on a future memorial.

== Rebuilding ==
The Ma Durga Mandir and the Radha Krisna Mandir are present in the area of the Ramna Kali Mandir. Others are planned. The government of India has pledged money for reconstruction efforts. Indian President, Ram Nath Kovind, visited the historic Ramna Kali temple in Dhaka during his visit to Bangladesh for the 50th Victory Day celebrations.

== Completion and inauguration ==
On 17 December 2021, Shri Ram Nath Kovind inaugurated the reconstructed Ramna Kali temple in Ramna, a part of the Bangladeshi capital Dhaka where the landmark Suhrawardy Udyan (the former Ramna Race Course) is located. The First Lady of India, Mrs. Kovind, and their daughter accompanied the President of India in the stated ceremony.

"The historic Ramna Kali temple is a symbol of the spiritual and cultural bonding among the people of India and Bangladesh.", Mr. Kovind said at the ceremony.

After Bangladesh gained independence from Pakistan, a small temple was set up at the site for people to offer prayers. A reconstruction of the complex was announced in 2017, when then External Affairs Minister of India, the late Sushma Swaraj, inaugurated 15 development projects in Baridhara, Dhaka.

== Gallery ==
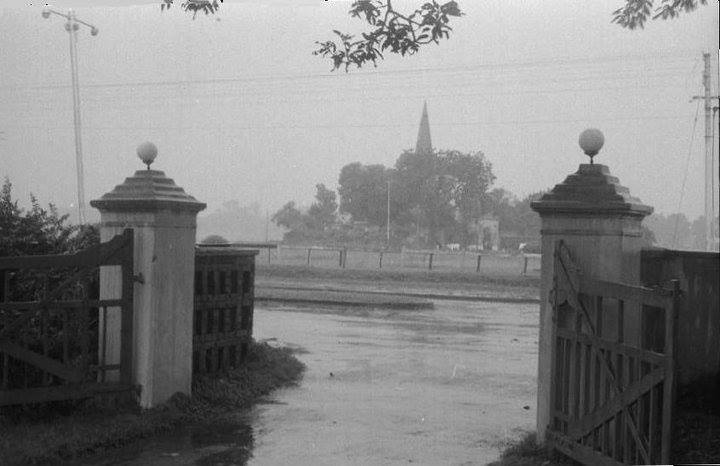
A view of the temple from the gateway of Bangla Academy (1965)

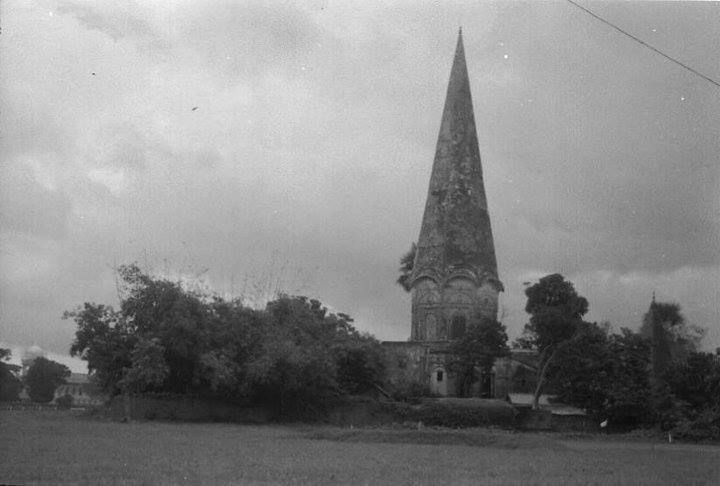
The temple in 1967

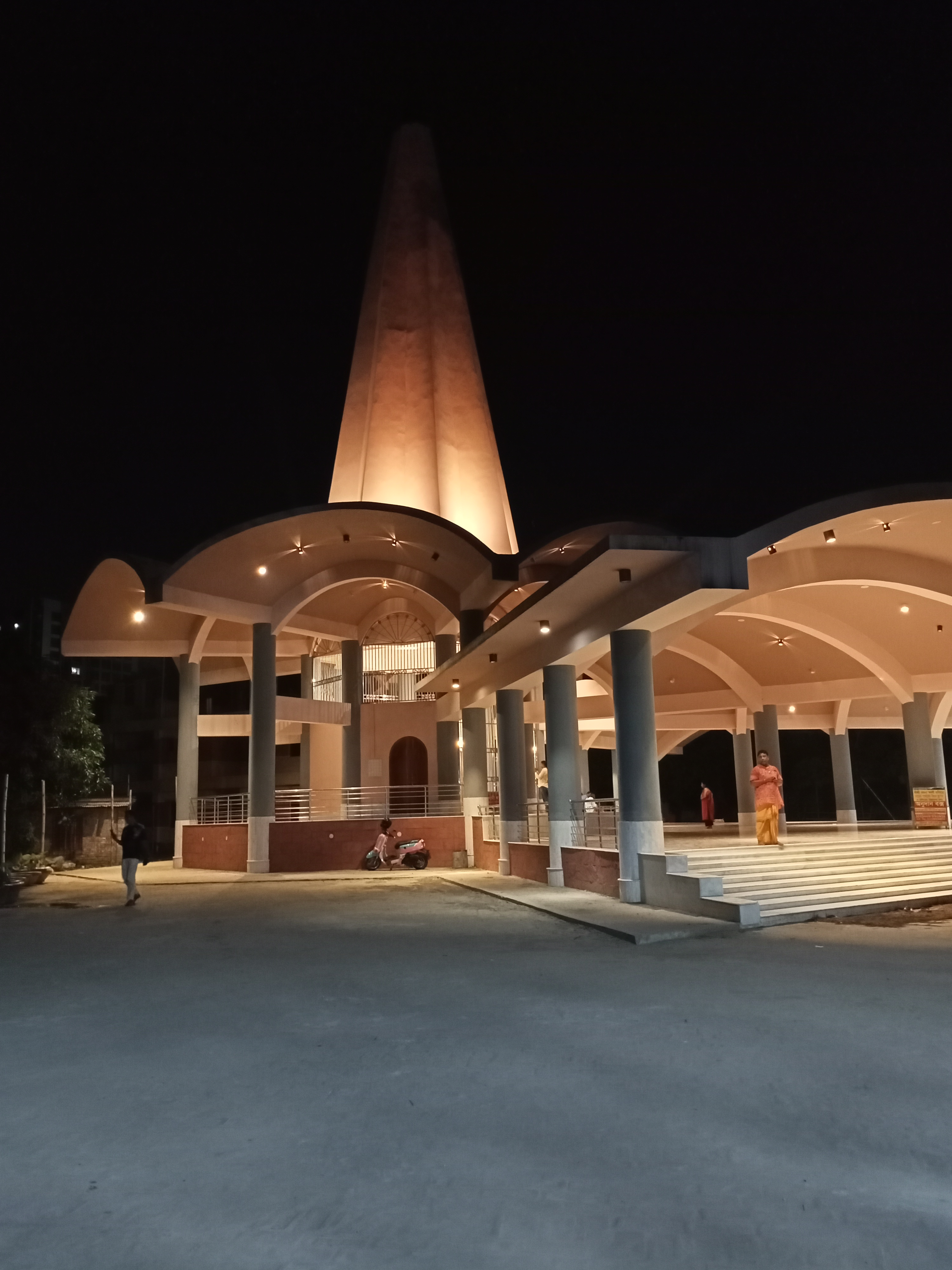
Night view

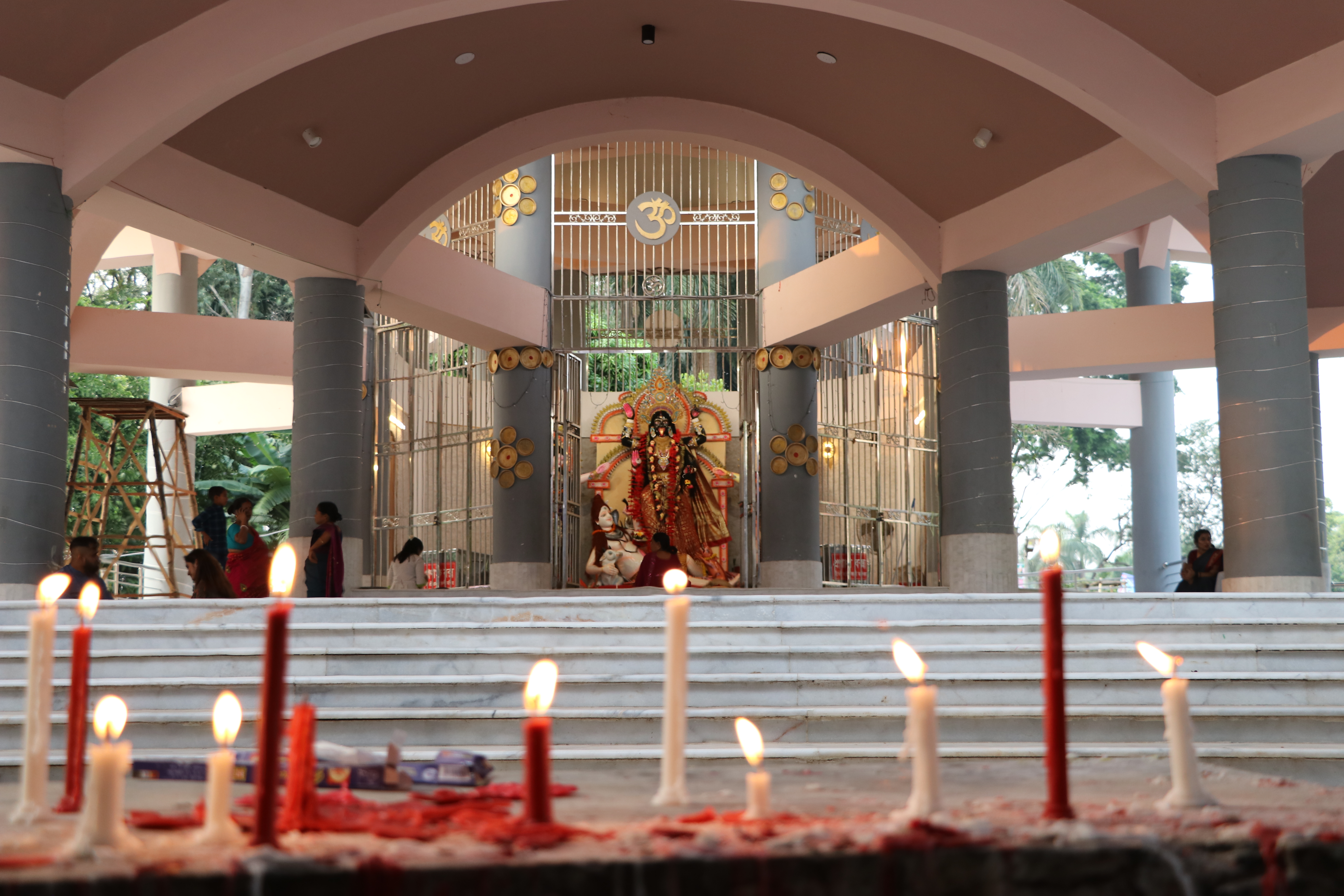
Idol of the goddess Kali in Ramna Kali Temple

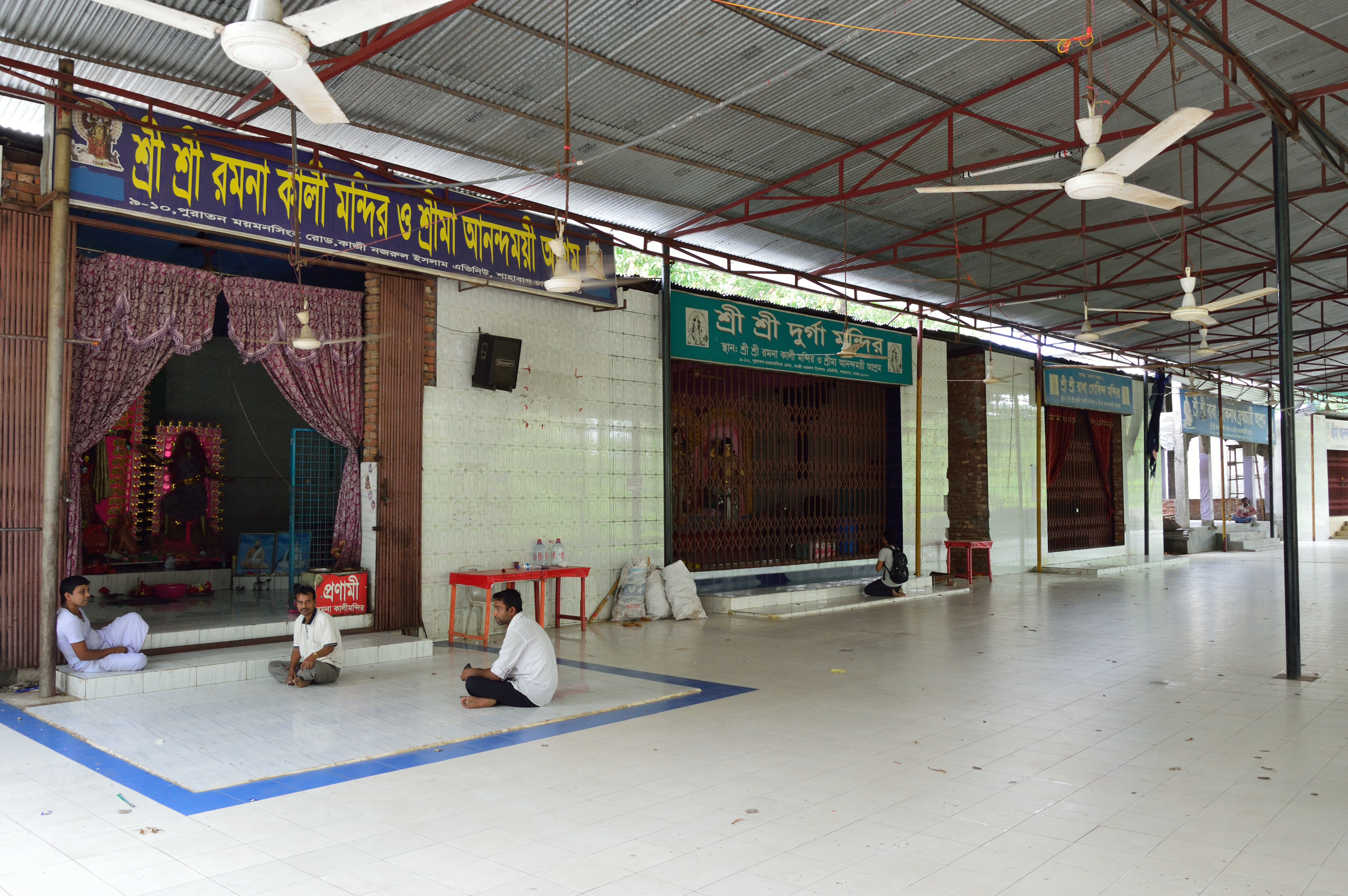
Ma Anandamayi Ashram

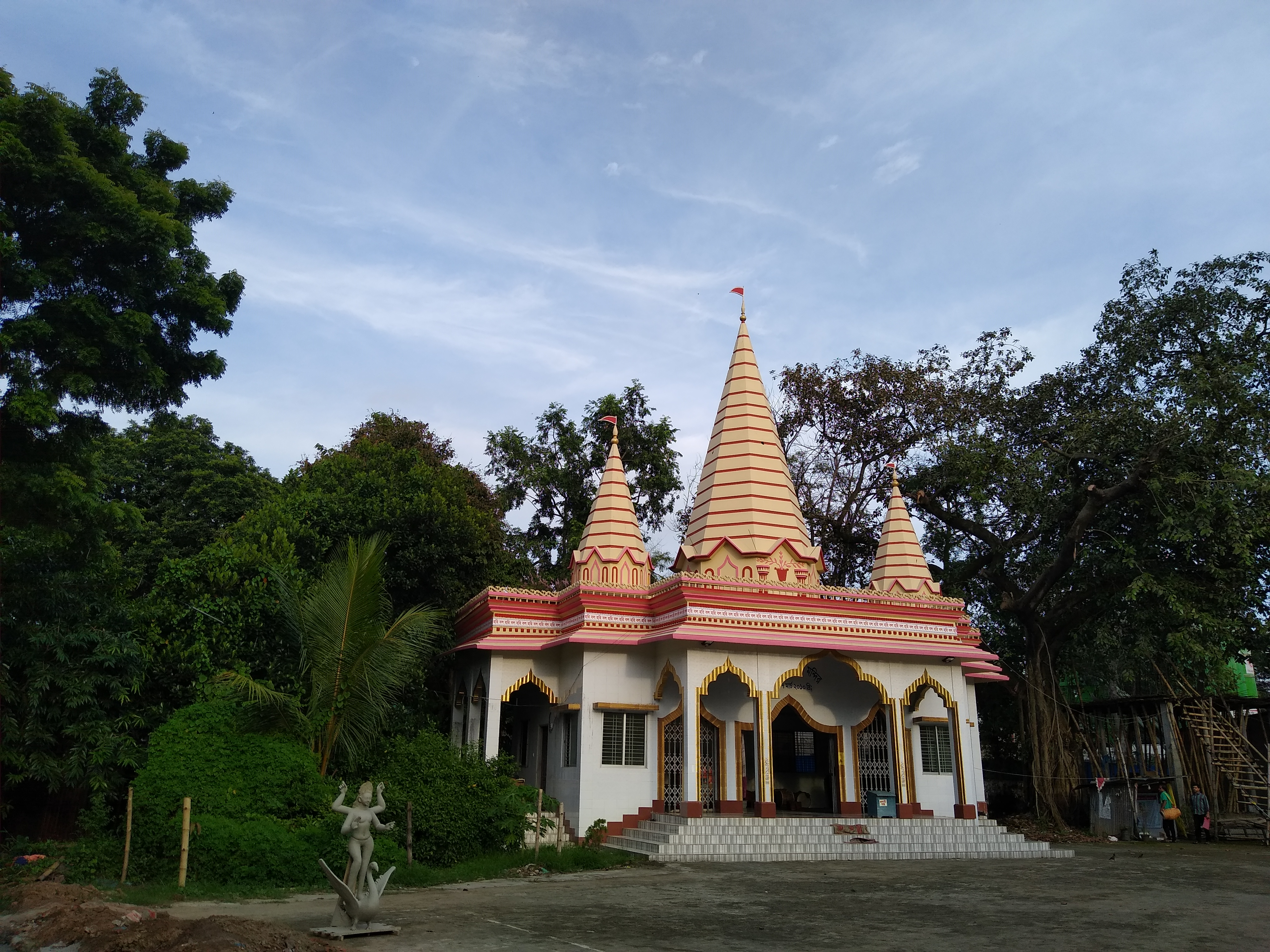
Harichand Temple

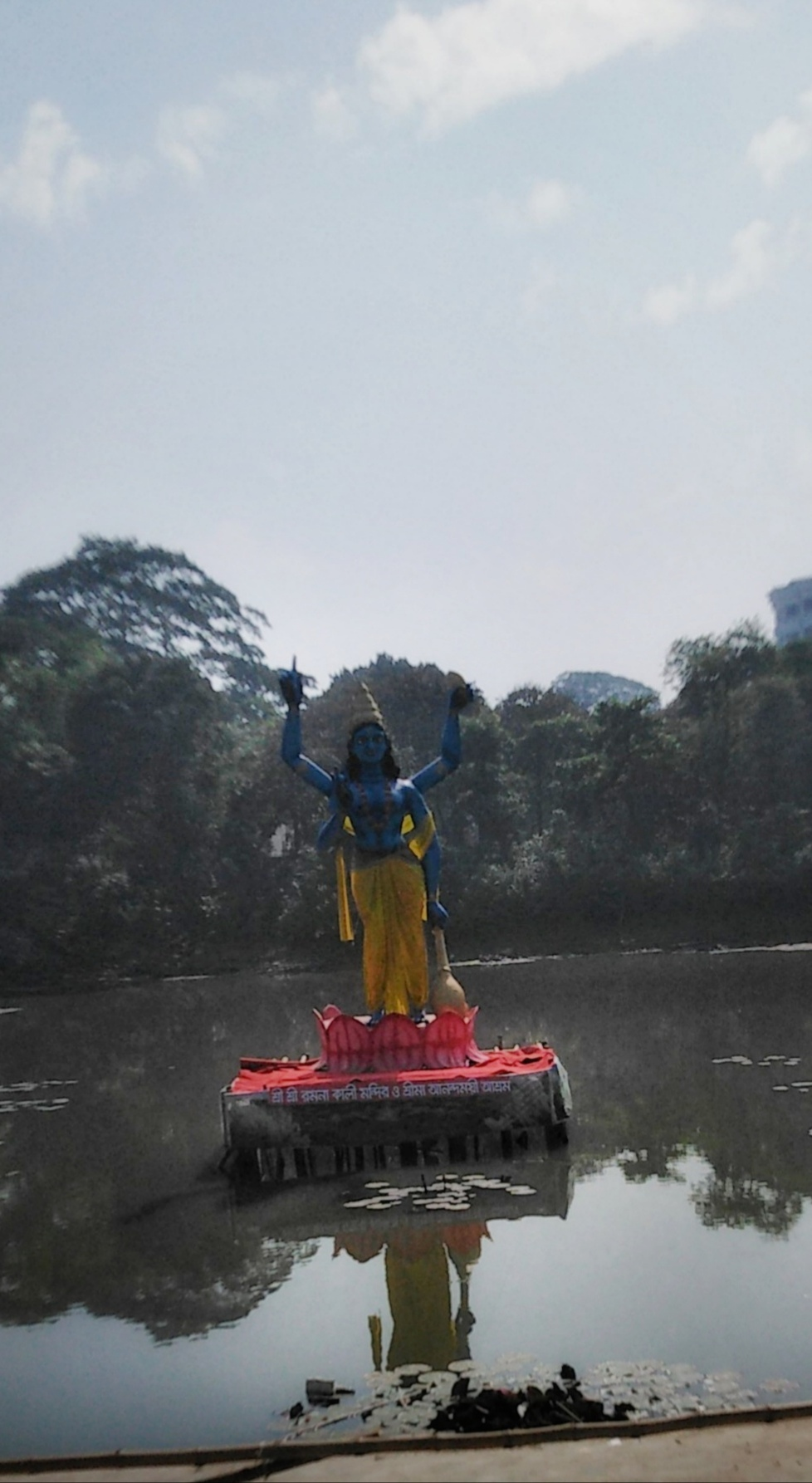
The dighi (pool)
