= Wards of Bangladesh =

Administrative unit of Bangladesh

In Bangladesh, a ward is a subdivision of a city or town, primarily used as an electoral and administrative unit. It serves as the basic representative unit within a City Corporation or Municipality, created to ensure direct local representation. Each ward elects one council member, who represents the residents in the city corporation or municipal council and participates in local governance and decision-making.

== See also ==
- Ward (electoral subdivision)
- Wards of Sylhet City Corporation
