= Mughal Empire =

1526–1857 empire in South Asia

- 1526–1857
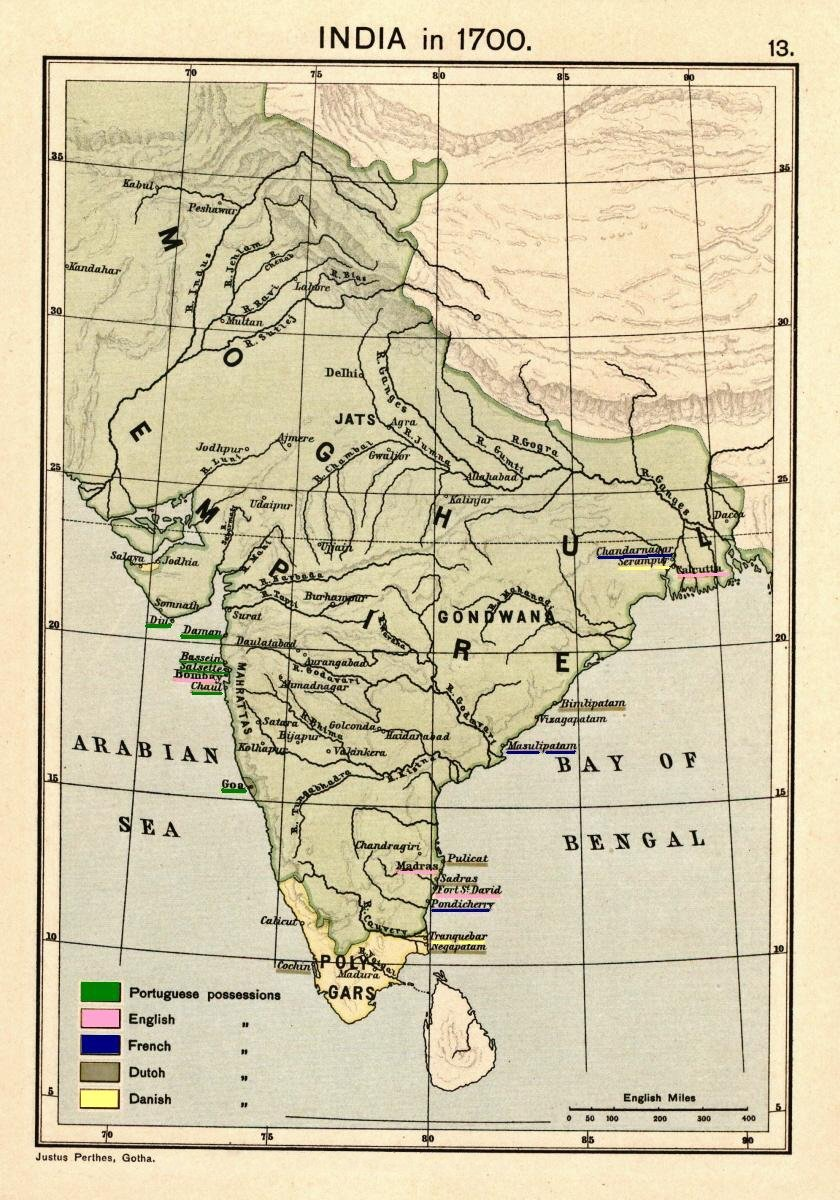
- The empire at its greatest extent c. 1700, under Aurangzeb
- Status: Empire
- Capital: Agra (1526–1530; 1560–1571; 1598–1648); Delhi (1530–1540; 1639–1857); Fatehpur Sikri (1571–1585); Lahore (1586–1598)
- Official languages: Persian
- Common languages: See Languages of South Asia
- Religion: State religion Islam (Note: Branch: Sunni School of jurisprudence: Hanafi); Din-i Ilahi (1582–1605) Others Hinduism (majority), Sikhism and more
- Demonym: Mughal
- Government: Monarchy
- Emperor
  - 1526–1530 (first): Babur
  - 1837–1857 (last): Bahadur Shah II
- Vicegerent
  - 1526–1540 (first): Mir Khalifa
  - 1794–1818 (last): Daulat Rao Sindhia
- Grand Vizier
  - 1526–1540 (first): Mir Khalifa
  - 1775–1797 (last): Asaf-ud-Daula
- Historical era: Early modern
  - First Battle of Panipat: 21 April 1526
  - Mughal Interregnum: 17 May 1540 – 22 June 1555
  - Second Battle of Panipat: 5 November 1556
  - Mughal–Afghan Wars: 21 April 1526 – 3 April 1752
  - Deccan wars: 1680–1707
  - Nader Shah's invasion of India: 1738–1740
  - Siege of Delhi: 21 September 1857
  - Mughal Emperor exiled to British Burma: 7 October 1858

Area
- c. 1600: 3,200,000 km^{2} (1,200,000 sq mi)
- 1690: 4,000,000 km^{2} (1,500,000 sq mi)

Population
  - c. 1600: 150,000,000
  - c. 1700: 158,400,000
- Currency: Rupee, Taka, dam
Preceded by	Succeeded by
Delhi Sultanate; Sur Empire	Company rule in India; British Raj
- Today part of: India; Pakistan; Bangladesh; Afghanistan

The Mughal Empire was an early modern empire in South Asia. At its peak, the empire stretched from the outer fringes of the Indus River Basin in the west, northern Afghanistan in the northwest, and Kashmir in the north, to the highlands of present-day Assam and Bangladesh in the east, and the uplands of the Deccan Plateau in South India.

The Mughal Empire is conventionally said to have been founded in 1526 by Babur, a Timurid prince hailing from the Fergana Valley in Central Asia, who, with assistance from the Safavid and Ottoman empires, defeated the Sultan of Delhi, Ibrahim Lodi, in the First Battle of Panipat and swept down the plains of northern India. The Mughal imperial structure, however, is sometimes dated to 1600, during the rule of Babur's grandson, Akbar. This imperial structure lasted until 1720, shortly after the death of the last major emperor, Aurangzeb, during whose reign the empire also achieved its maximum geographical extent. Reduced subsequently to the region in and around Old Delhi by 1760, the empire was formally dissolved by the British Raj after the Indian Rebellion of 1857.

Although the Mughal Empire was created and sustained by military warfare, it did not vigorously suppress the cultures and peoples it came to rule; rather, it equalised and placated them through new administrative practices, and diverse ruling elites, leading to more efficient, centralised, and standardised rule. The basis of the empire's collective wealth was agricultural taxes, implemented by the third Mughal emperor, Akbar. These taxes, which amounted to well over half the output of a peasant cultivator, were paid in a well-regulated silver currency, and allowed peasants and artisans to enter larger markets.

The relative peace maintained by the empire during much of the 17th century was a factor in India's economic expansion. The burgeoning European presence in the Indian Ocean and an increasing demand for Indian raw and finished products generated much wealth for the Mughal court. There was conspicuous consumption among the Mughal elite, resulting in greater patronage of painting, literary forms, textiles, and architecture, especially during the reign of Shah Jahan. Among the Mughal UNESCO World Heritage Sites in South Asia are Agra Fort, Fatehpur Sikri, Red Fort, Humayun's Tomb, Lahore Fort, Shalamar Gardens, and the Taj Mahal, which has been described as "the jewel of Muslim art in India, and one of the universally admired masterpieces of the world's heritage".

== Name ==
The word Mughal (also spelled Mogul or Moghul in English) is the Indo-Persian form of Mongol, used in India to highlight its rulers' Turco-Mongol origins, and to set them apart from the Afghan elite who ruled the Delhi Sultanate. In the West, the terms Grand Mughal and Mughal were used for the emperor and, by extension, the empire as a whole.

The closest to an official name for the empire was Hindustan, which was documented in the Ain-i-Akbari. Mughal administrative records also refer to the empire as "dominion of Hindustan" (Wilāyat-i-Hindustān), "country of Hind" (Bilād-i-Hind), "Sultanate of al-Hind" (Salṭanat(i) al-Hindīyyah), as observed in the epitaph of Emperor Aurangzeb, or endonymous identification from emperor Bahadur Shah Zafar as "Land of Hind" (Hindostān) in Hindustani. Contemporary Chinese chronicles referred to the empire as Hindustan (Héndūsītǎn). The Hindu kings of Nepal pejoratively referred to the Mughal Empire as Mughlana, in contrast with their own kingdom, which they referred to as Asal Hindustan (lit. 'real land of the Hindus').

The term "Mughal Dynasty" remains disputed by Indologists. In Marshall Hodgson's view, a better historiographical designation would be Timurid/Timuri or Indo-Timurid. Members of the dynasty called it Gurkani (Gūrkāniyān), a reference to their descent from the Turco-Mongol conqueror Timur, who took the title Gūrkān 'son-in-law' after his marriage to a Chinggisid princess.

== History ==
=== Babur and Humayun (1526–1556) ===
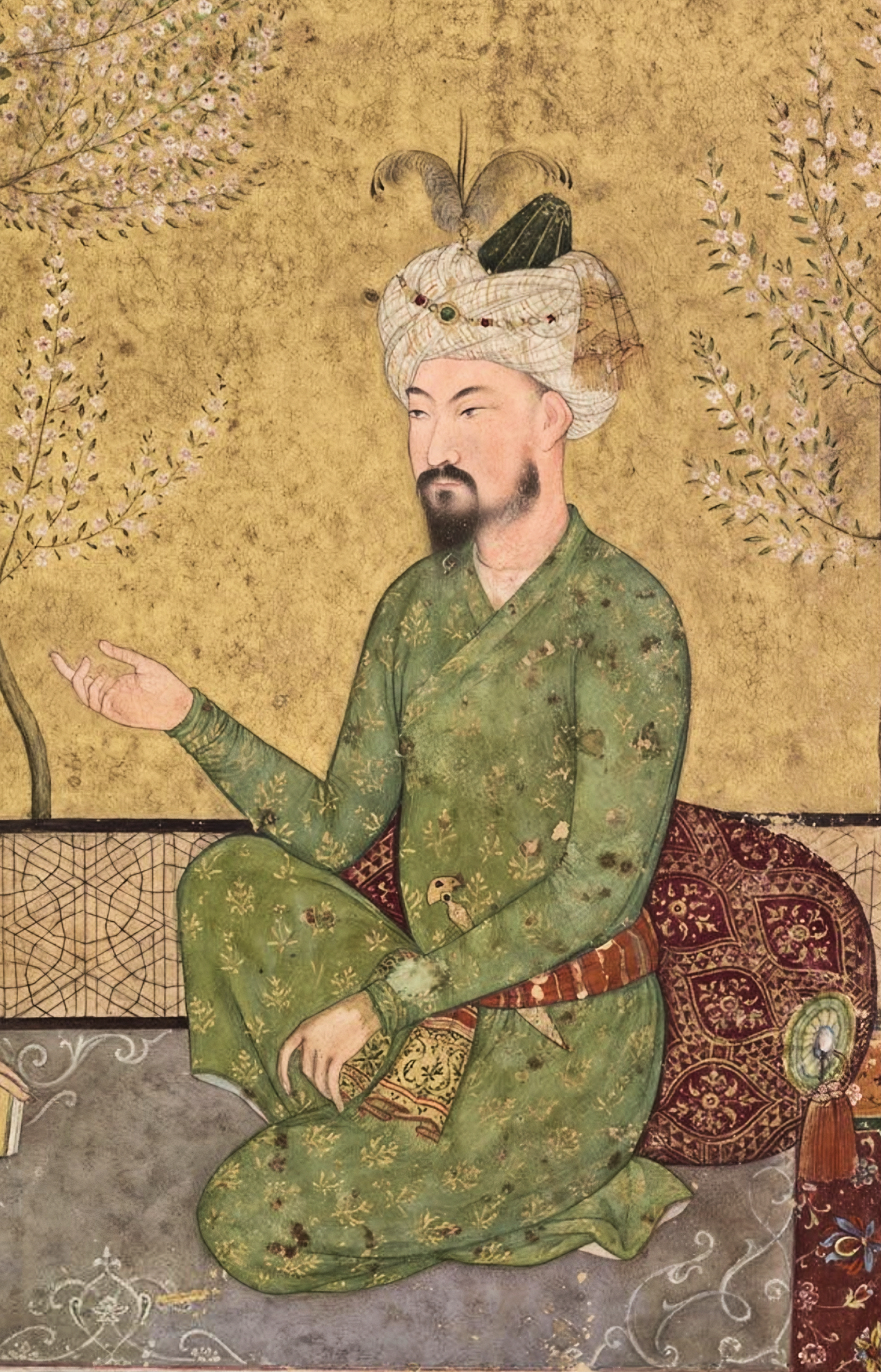
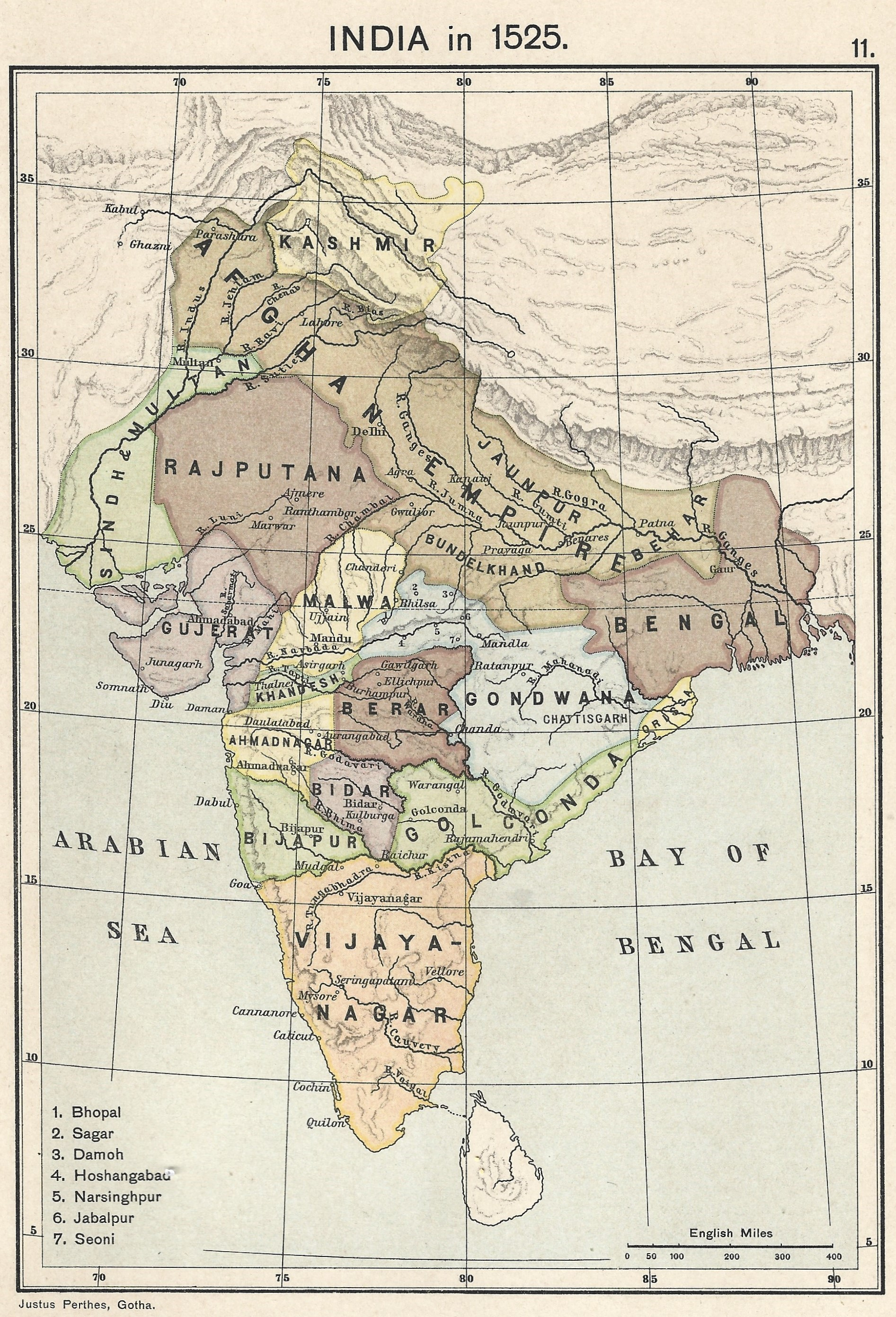
Portrait of Babur in the Late Shah Jahan Album, and map of India in 1525 just before the onset of Mughal rule

The Mughal Empire was founded by Babur (reigned 1526–1530), a Central Asian ruler who was descended from the Turco-Mongol conqueror Timur (the founder of the Timurid Empire) on his father's side, and from Genghis Khan on his mother's side. Paternally, Babur belonged to the Turkified Barlas tribe of Mongol origin. Ousted from his ancestral domains in Central Asia, Babur turned to India to satisfy his ambitions. He established himself in Kabul and then pushed steadily southward into India from Afghanistan through the Khyber Pass. Babur's forces defeated Ibrahim Lodi, Sultan of Delhi, in the First Battle of Panipat in 1526. Through his use of firearms and cannons, he was able to shatter Ibrahim's armies despite being at a numerical disadvantage, expanding his dominion up to the mid Indo-Gangetic Plain. After the battle, the centre of Mughal power shifted to Agra. The Battle of Khanwa fought near Agra in 1527 between Babur and Rana Sanga of Mewar was another decisive victory in the Mughal conquest of northern India.

The preoccupation with wars and military campaigns, however, did not allow the new emperor to consolidate the gains he had made in India. The instability of the empire became evident under his son, Humayun (reigned 1530–1556), who was forced into exile in Persia by the rebellious Sher Shah Suri (reigned 1540–1545). Humayun's exile in Persia established diplomatic ties between the Safavid and Mughal courts and led to increasing Persian cultural influence in the later restored Mughal Empire. Humayun's triumphant return from Persia in 1555 restored Mughal rule in some parts of India, but he died in an accident the next year.

=== Akbar to Aurangzeb (1556–1707) ===
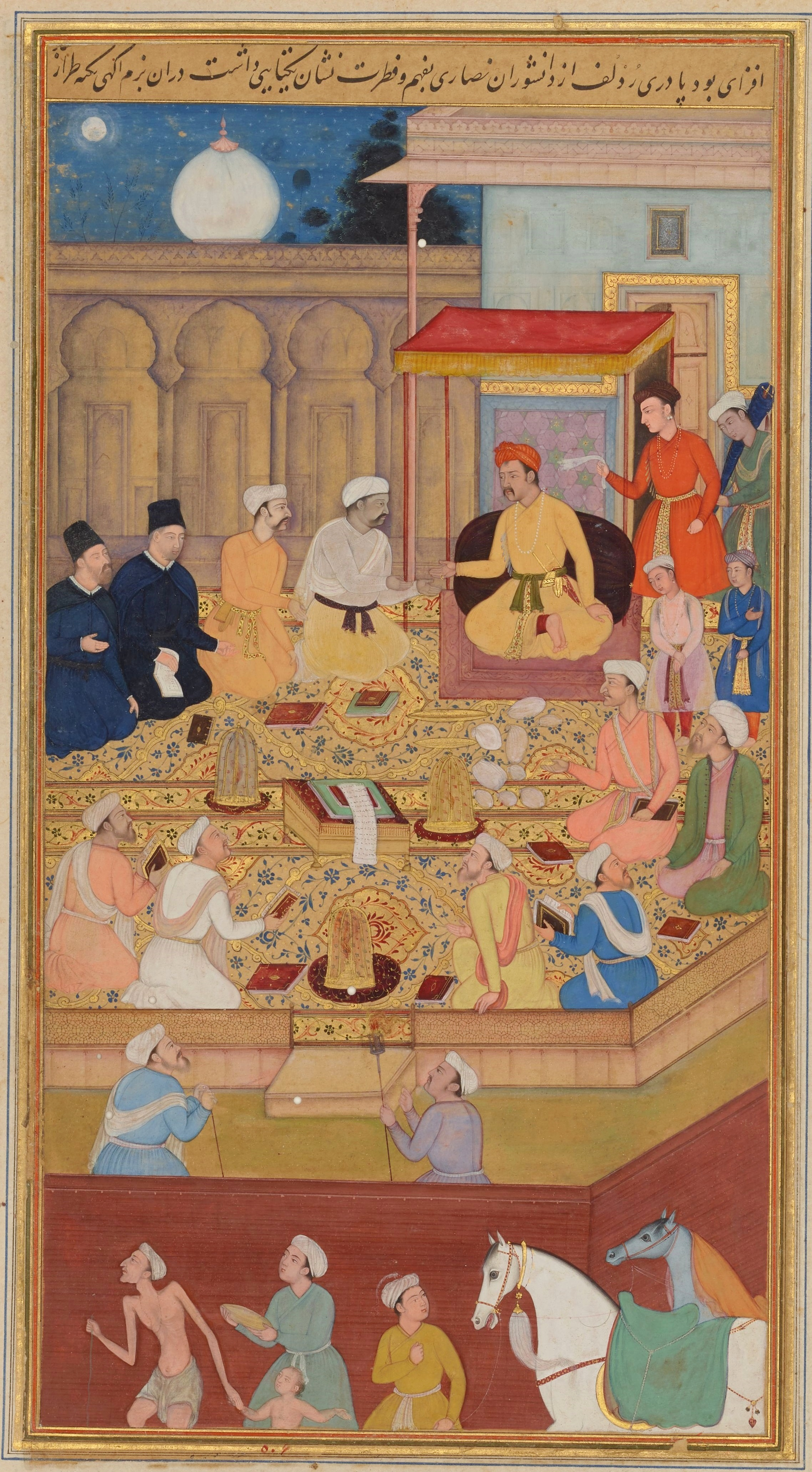
Akbar holds a religious assembly of different faiths in the Ibadat Khana in Fatehpur Sikri.

Akbar (reigned 1556–1605) was born Jalal-ud-din Muhammad in the Umarkot Fort, to Humayun and his wife Hamida Banu Begum, a Persian princess. Akbar succeeded to the throne under a regent, Bairam Khan, who helped consolidate the Mughal Empire in India. Through a series of wars, Akbar was able to extend the empire in all directions and controlled almost the entire Indian subcontinent north of the Godavari River. He created a new ruling elite loyal to him, implemented a modern administration, and encouraged cultural developments. He increased trade with European trading companies. India developed a strong and stable economy, leading to commercial expansion and economic development. Akbar allowed freedom of religion at his court and attempted to resolve socio-political and cultural differences in his empire by establishing a new religion, Din-i Ilahi, with strong characteristics of a ruler cult. He left his son an internally stable state, which was in the midst of its golden age, but before long signs of political weakness would emerge.

Jahangir (born Salim, reigned 1605–1627) was born to Akbar and his wife Mariam-uz-Zamani, an Indian princess. Salim was named after the Indian Sufi saint, Salim Chishti. He "was addicted to opium, neglected the affairs of the state, and came under the influence of rival court cliques". Jahangir distinguished himself from Akbar by making substantial efforts to gain the support of the Islamic religious establishment. One way he did this was by bestowing many more madad-i-ma'ash (tax-free personal land revenue grants given to religiously learned or spiritually worthy individuals) than Akbar had. In contrast to Akbar, Jahangir came into conflict with non-Muslim religious leaders, notably the Sikh guru Arjan, whose execution was the first of many conflicts between the Mughal Empire and the Sikh community.

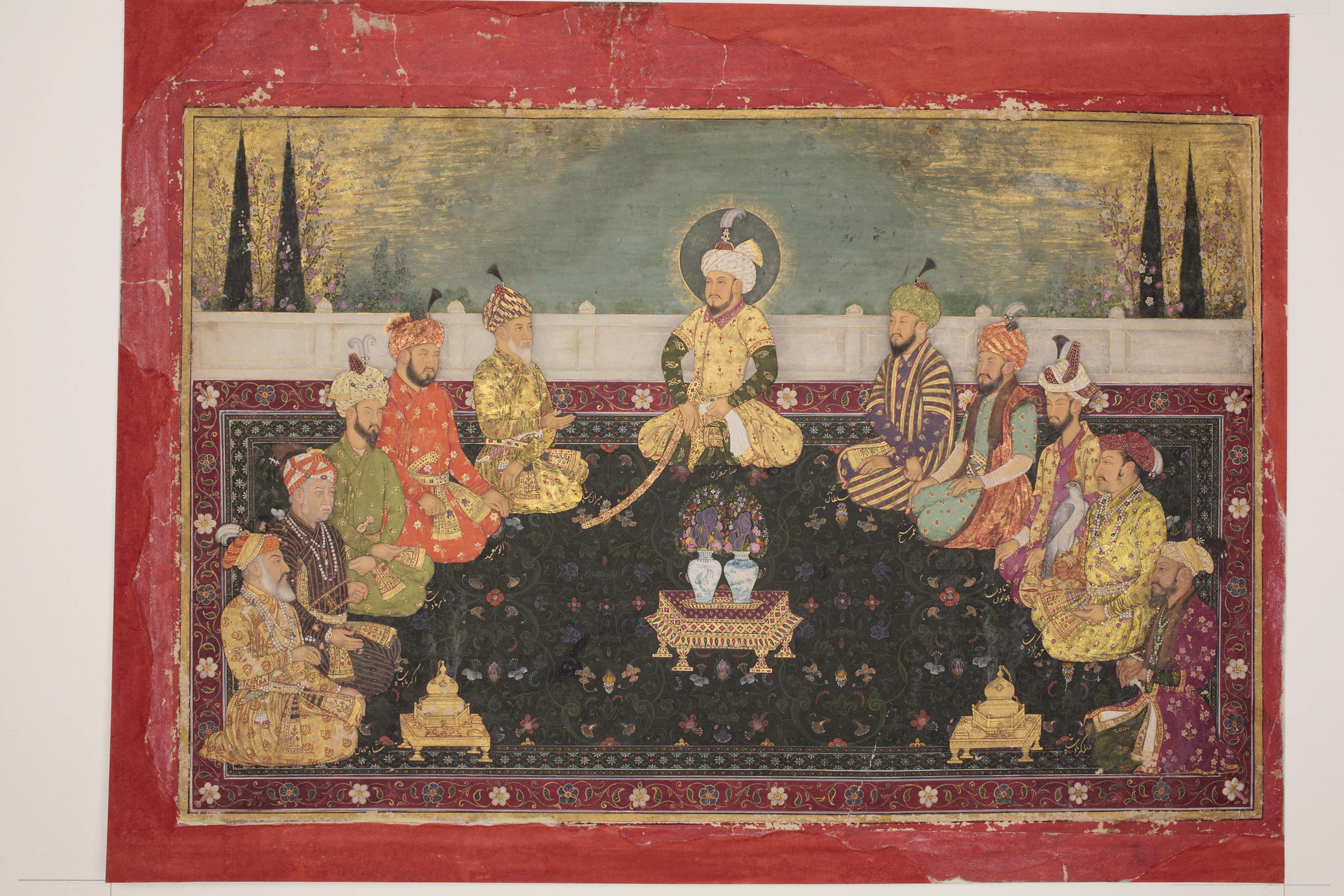
Group portrait of Mughal rulers, from Babur to Aurangzeb, with the Mughal ancestor Timur seated in the middle. On the left: Shah Jahan, Akbar and Babur, with Abu Sa'id of Samarkand and Timur's son, Miran Shah. On the right: Aurangzeb, Jahangir and Humayun, and two of Timur's other offspring Umar Shaykh and Muhammad Sultan. Created c. 1707–12.

Shah Jahan (reigned 1628–1658) was born to Jahangir and his wife Jagat Gosain. His reign ushered in the golden age of Mughal architecture. During the reign of Shah Jahan, the splendour of the Mughal court reached its peak, as exemplified by the Taj Mahal. The cost of maintaining the court, however, began to exceed the revenue coming in. Shah Jahan extended the Mughal Empire to the Deccan by ending the Ahmadnagar Sultanate and forcing the Adil Shahis and Qutb Shahis to pay tribute.

Shah Jahan's eldest son, the liberal Dara Shikoh, became regent in 1658, as a result of his father's illness. Dara championed a syncretistic Hindu-Muslim culture, emulating his great-grandfather Akbar. With the support of the Islamic orthodoxy, however, a younger son of Shah Jahan, Aurangzeb (r. 1658–1707), seized the throne. Aurangzeb defeated Dara in 1659 and had him executed. Although Shah Jahan fully recovered from his illness, Aurangzeb kept Shah Jahan imprisoned until he died in 1666. Aurangzeb brought the empire to its greatest territorial extent, and oversaw an increase in the Islamicisation of the Mughal state. He encouraged conversion to Islam, reinstated the jizya on non-Muslims, and compiled the Fatawa 'Alamgiri, a collection of Islamic law. Aurangzeb also ordered the execution of the Sikh guru Tegh Bahadur, leading to the militarisation of the Sikh community. From the imperial perspective, conversion to Islam integrated local elites into the king's vision of a network of shared identity that would join disparate groups throughout the empire in obedience to the Mughal emperor. He led campaigns from 1682 in the Deccan, annexing its remaining Muslim powers of Bijapur and Golconda, though engaged in a prolonged conflict in the region which had a ruinous effect on the empire. The campaigns took a toll on the Mughal treasury, and Aurangzeb's absence led to a severe decline in governance, while stability and economic output in the Mughal Deccan plummeted.

Aurangzeb is considered the most controversial Mughal emperor, with some historians arguing his religious conservatism and intolerance undermined the stability of Mughal society, while other historians question this, noting that he financed or patronised the building of non-Muslim institutions, employed significantly more Hindus in his imperial bureaucracy than his predecessors did, and opposed bigotry against Hindus and Shi'a Muslims.

=== Decline (1707–1857) ===
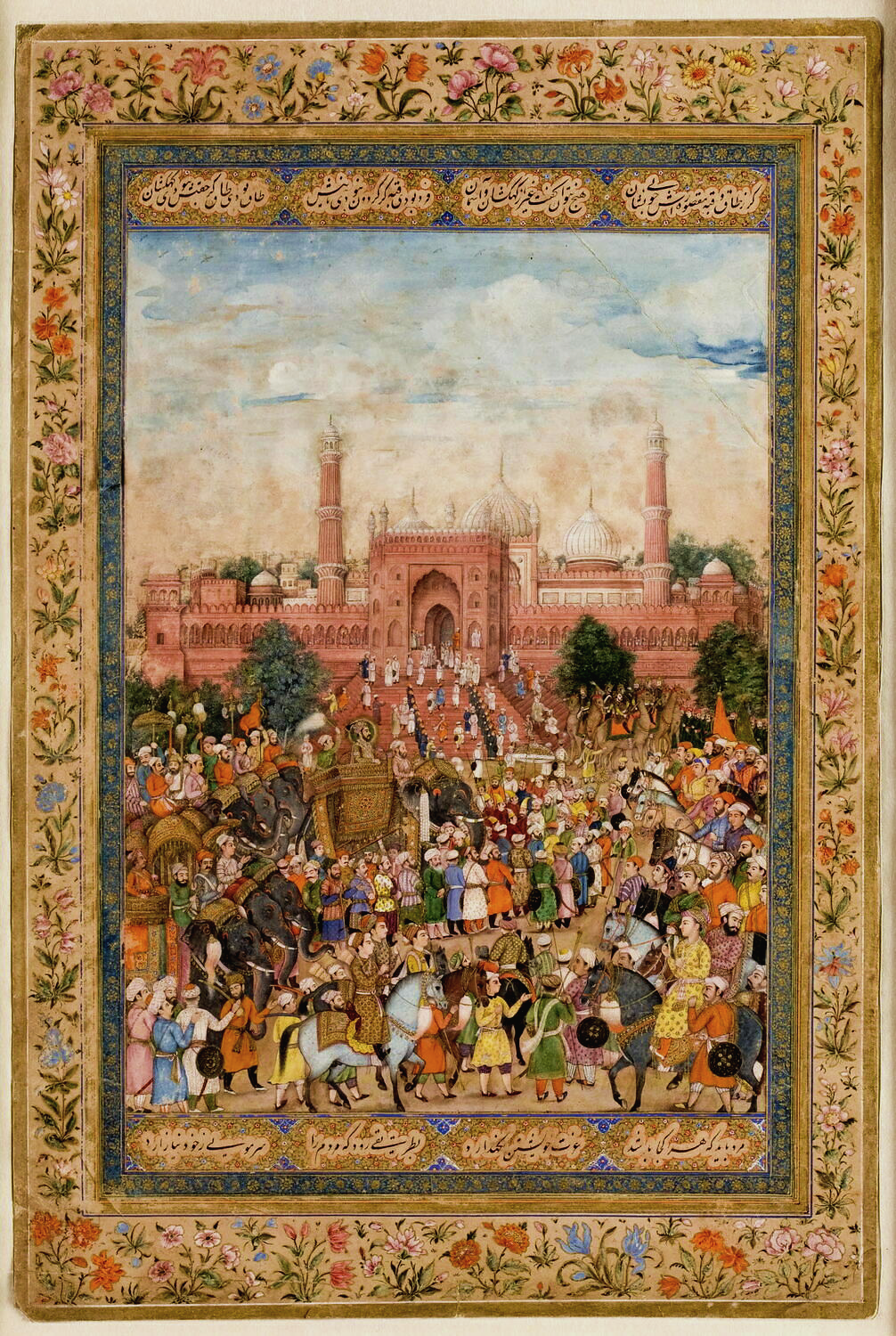
Delhi under the puppet-emperor Farrukhsiyar. Effective power was held by the Sayyid Brothers.

Aurangzeb's son, Bahadur Shah I, repealed the religious policies of his father and attempted to reform the administration. "However, after he died in 1712, the Mughal dynasty began to sink into chaos and violent feuds. In 1719 alone, four emperors successively ascended the throne" as figureheads under the Indian Muslim clan known as the Barha family, whose leaders, the Sayyid brothers, became the de facto sovereigns in the empire.

During the reign of Muhammad Shah (reigned 1719–1748), the empire began to break up, and vast tracts of central India passed from Mughal to Maratha hands. As the Mughals tried to suppress the independence of Asaf Jah I in the Deccan, he encouraged the Marathas to invade central and northern India. The Indian campaign of Nader Shah culminated with the sack of Delhi in 1739, shattering the remnants of Mughal power and prestige, and taking off all the accumulated Mughal treasury. The Mughals could no longer finance the huge armies with which they had formerly enforced their rule. Many of the empire's elites now sought to control their affairs and broke away to form independent kingdoms. But lip service continued to be paid to the Mughal Emperor as the highest manifestation of sovereignty. Not only the Muslim gentry, but the Maratha, Rajput, and Sikh leaders took part in ceremonial acknowledgements of the emperor as the sovereign of India.

Meanwhile, some regional polities within the increasingly fragmented Mughal Empire involved themselves and the state in global conflicts, leading only to defeat and loss of territory during conflicts such as the Carnatic wars and Bengal War.

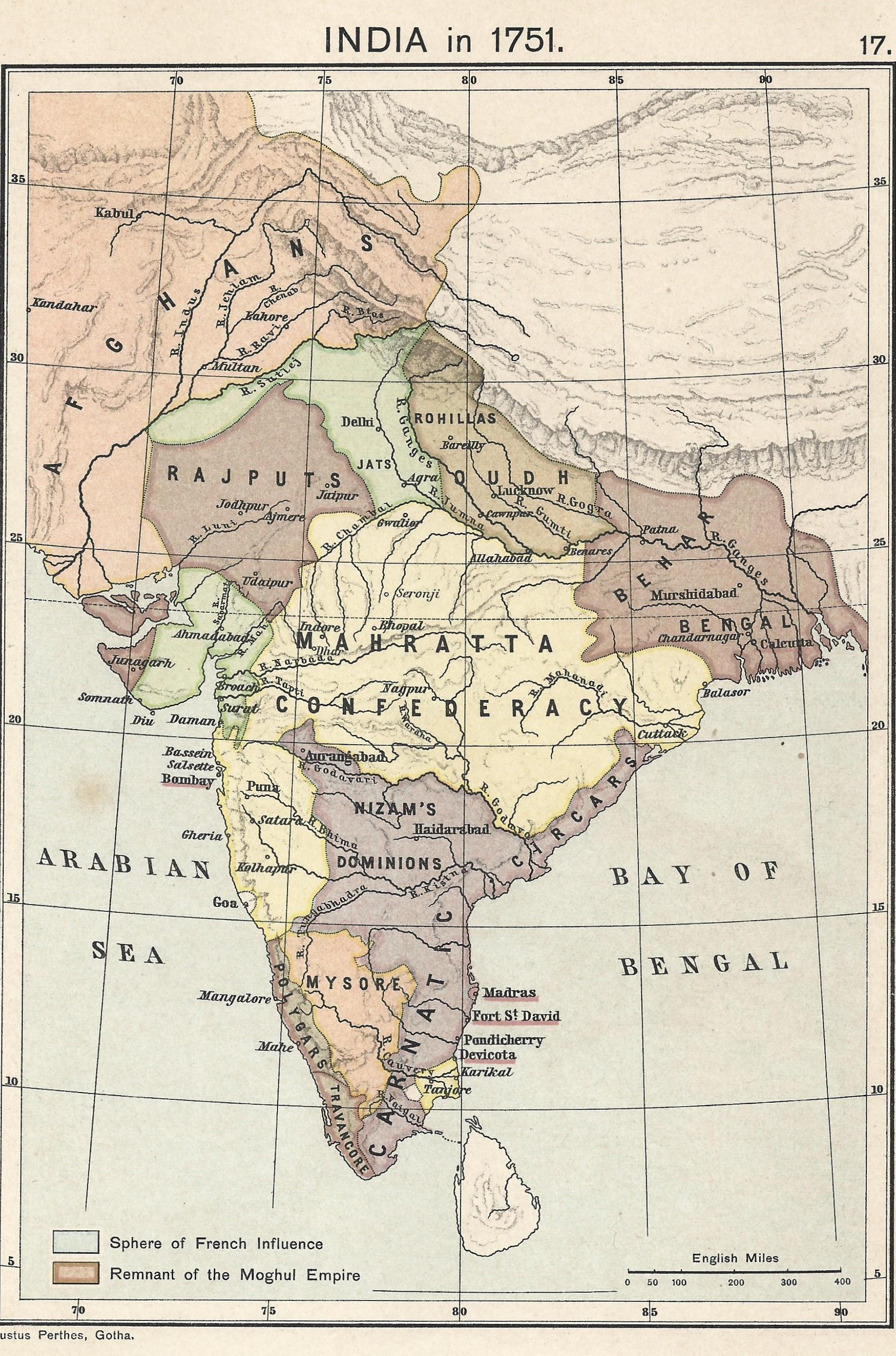
The remnants of the empire in 1751

The Mughal Emperor Shah Alam II (1759–1806) made futile attempts to reverse the Mughal decline. Delhi was sacked by the Afghans, and when the Third Battle of Panipat was fought between the Maratha Empire and the Afghans led by Ahmad Shah Durrani in 1761, in which the Afghans were victorious, the emperor had ignominiously taken temporary refuge with the British to the east. In 1771, the Marathas recaptured Delhi from the Rohillas, and in 1784 the Marathas officially became the protectors of the emperor in Delhi, a state of affairs that continued until the Second Anglo-Maratha War. Thereafter, the British East India Company became the protectors of the Mughal dynasty in Delhi. The British East India Company took control of the former Mughal province of Bengal-Bihar in 1793 after it abolished local rule (Nizamat) that lasted until 1858, marking the beginning of the British colonial era over the Indian subcontinent. By 1857 a considerable part of former Mughal India was under the East India Company's control. After a crushing defeat in the Indian Rebellion of 1857 which he nominally led, the last Mughal emperor, Bahadur Shah Zafar, was deposed on 21 September 1857 after Delhi came under siege by the British East India Company and exiled in 1858 to Rangoon, Burma.

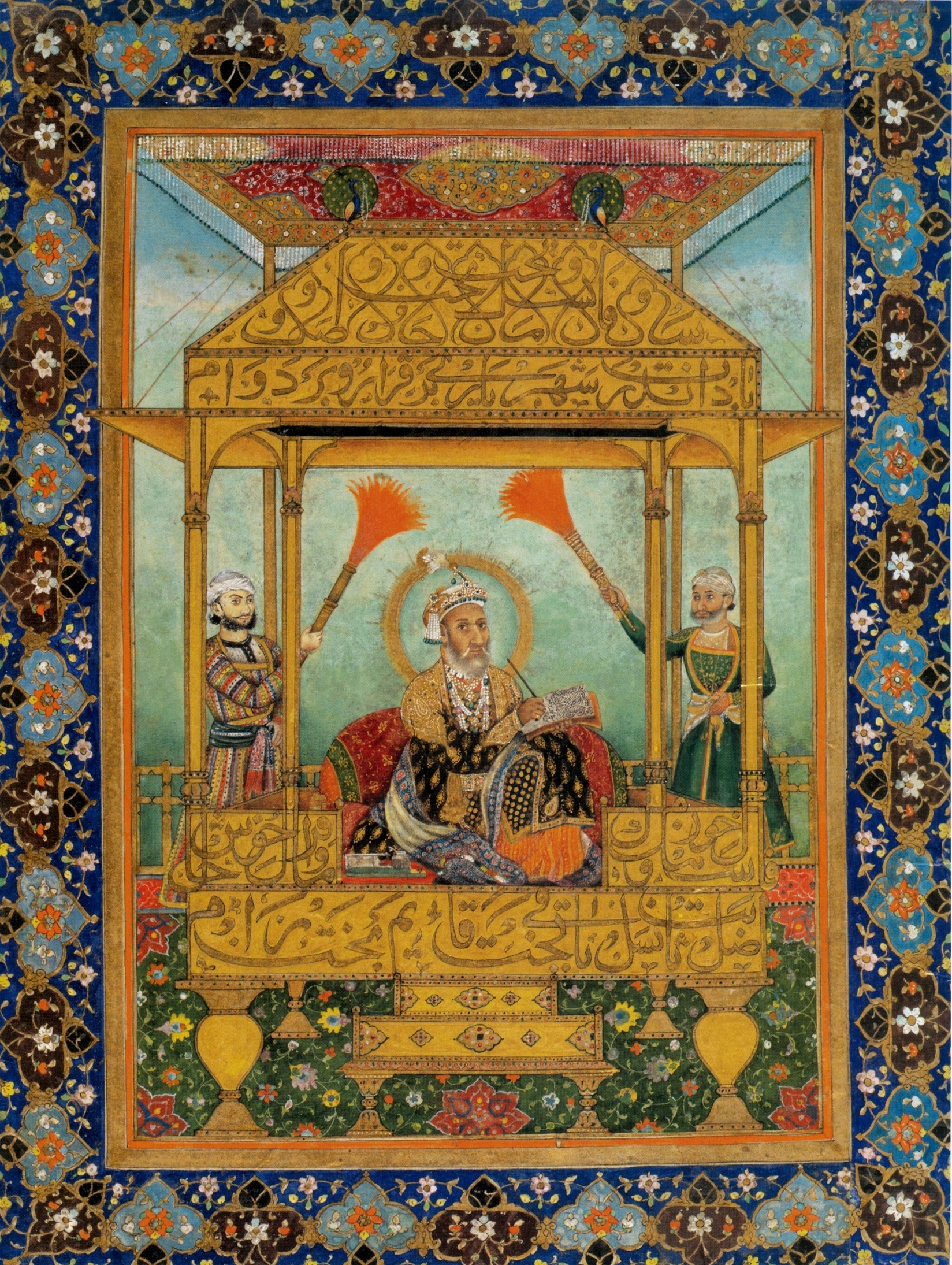
Portrait of Bahadur Shah Zafar

=== Causes of decline ===
Historians have offered numerous accounts of the several factors involved in the rapid collapse of the Mughal Empire between 1707 and 1720, after a century of growth and prosperity. A succession of short-lived incompetent and weak rulers, and civil wars over the succession, created political instability at the centre. The Mughals appeared virtually unassailable during the 17th century, but, once gone, their imperial overstretch became clear, and the situation could not be recovered. The seemingly innocuous European trading companies, such as the British East India Company, played no real part in the initial decline; they were still racing to get permission from the Mughal rulers to establish trades and factories in India.

In fiscal terms, the throne lost the revenues needed to pay its chief officers, the emirs (nobles) and their entourages. The emperor lost authority as the widely scattered imperial officers lost confidence in the central authorities and made their deals with local men of influence. The imperial army bogged down in long, futile wars against the more aggressive Marathas, and lost its fighting spirit. Finally came a series of violent political feuds over control of the throne. After the execution of Emperor Farrukhsiyar in 1719, local Mughal successor states took power in region after region.

== Administration and state ==
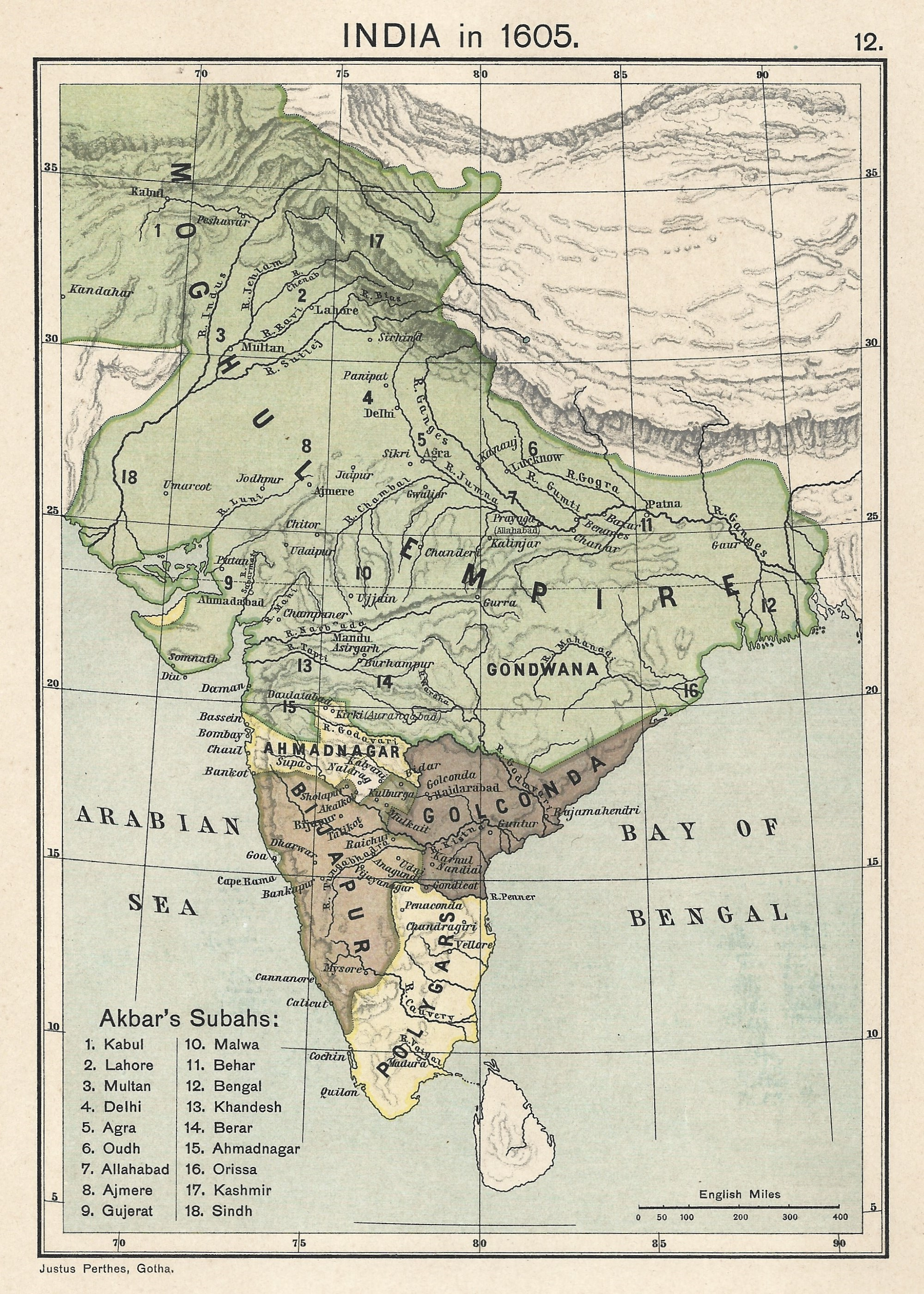
India in 1605 and the end of emperor Akbar's reign; the map shows the different subahs, or provinces, of his administration.

The Mughal Empire had a highly centralised, bureaucratic government, most of which was instituted during the rule of the third Mughal emperor, Akbar. The central government was headed by the Mughal emperor; immediately beneath him were four ministries. The finance/revenue ministry, headed by an official called a diwan, was responsible for controlling revenues from the empire's territories, calculating tax revenues, and using this information to distribute assignments. The ministry of the military (army/intelligence) was headed by an official titled mir bakhshi, who was in charge of military organisation, messenger service, and the mansabdari system. The ministry in charge of law/religious patronage was the responsibility of the sadr as-sudr, who appointed judges and managed charities and stipends. Another ministry was dedicated to the imperial household and public works, headed by the mir saman. Of these ministers, the diwan held the most importance, and typically acted as the wazir (prime minister) of the empire.

=== Administrative divisions ===
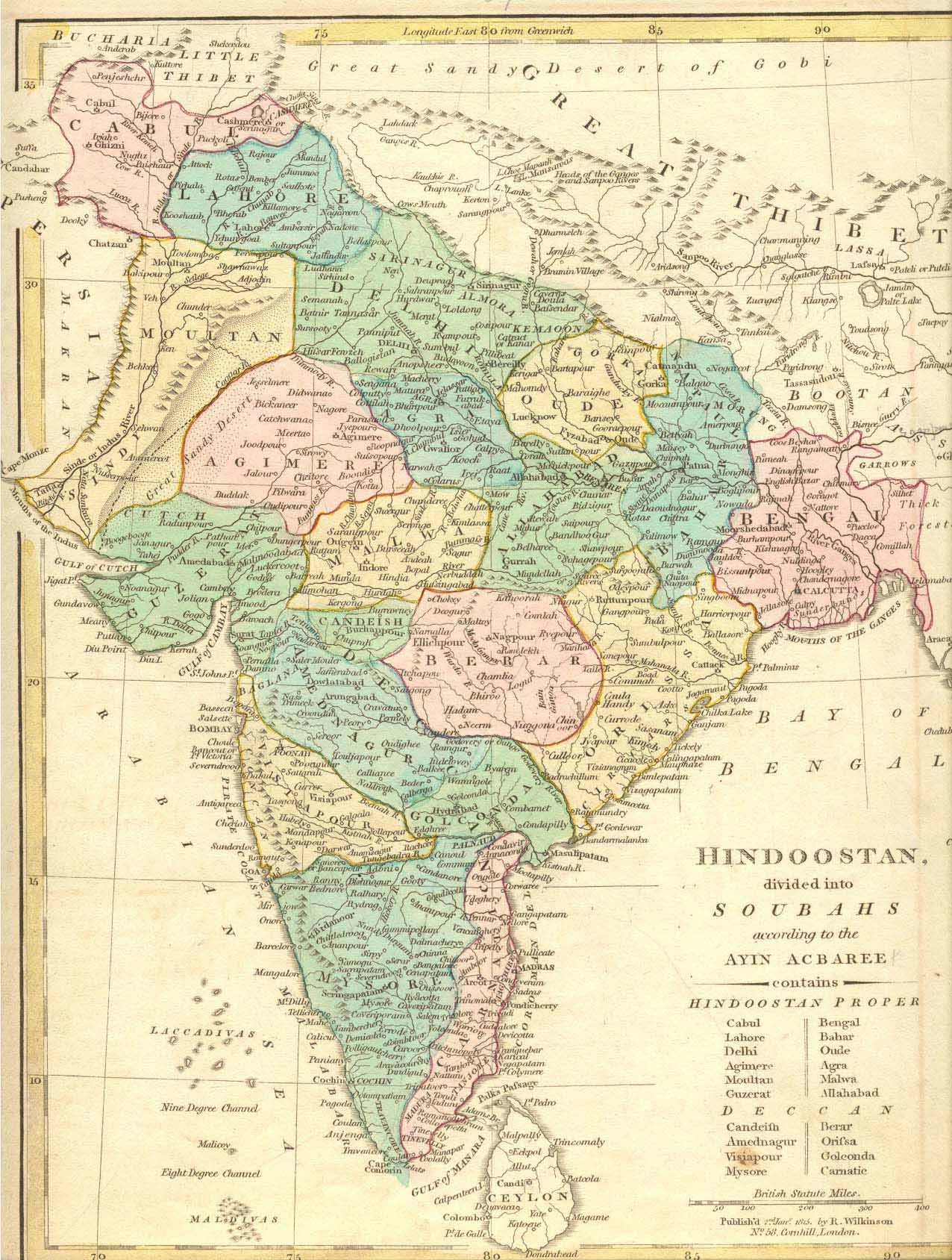
Ain-i-Akbari Subah, by Wilkinson, 1815

The empire was divided into subah (provinces), each of which was headed by a provincial governor called a subadar. The structure of the central government was mirrored at the provincial level; each suba had its own bakhshi, sadr as-sudr, and finance minister that reported directly to the central government rather than the subahdar. Subas were subdivided into administrative units known as sarkars, which were further divided into groups of villages known as parganas. The Mughal government in the pargana consisted of a Muslim judge and local tax collector. Parganas were the basic administrative unit of the Mughal Empire.

Mughal administrative divisions were not static. Territories were often rearranged and reconstituted for better administrative control, and to extend cultivation. For example, a sarkar could turn into a subah, and Parganas were often transferred between sarkars. The hierarchy of division was ambiguous sometimes, as a territory could fall under multiple overlapping jurisdictions. Administrative divisions were also vague in their geography — the Mughal state did not have enough resources or authority to undertake detailed land surveys, and hence the geographical limits of these divisions were not formalised and maps were not created. The Mughals instead recorded detailed statistics about each division, to assess the territory's capacity for revenue, based on simpler land surveys.

=== Capitals ===
The Mughals had multiple imperial capitals, established throughout their rule. These were the cities of Agra, Delhi, Lahore, and Fatehpur Sikri. Power often shifted back and forth between these capitals. Sometimes this was necessitated by political and military demands, but shifts also occurred for ideological reasons (for example, Akbar's establishment of Fatehpur Sikri), or even simply because the cost of establishing a new capital was marginal. Situations where two simultaneous capitals existed happened multiple times in Mughal history. Certain cities also served as short-term, provincial capitals, as was the case with Aurangzeb's shift to Aurangabad in the Deccan. Kabul was the summer capital of Mughals from 1526 to 1681.

The imperial camp, used for military expeditions and royal tours, also served as a kind of mobile, "de facto" administrative capital. From the time of Akbar, Mughal camps were huge in scale, accompanied by numerous personages associated with the royal court, as well as soldiers and labourers. All administration and governance were carried out within them. The Mughal Emperors spent a significant portion of their ruling period within these camps.

After Aurangzeb, the Mughal capital definitively became the walled city of Shahjahanabad (Old Delhi).

=== Law ===
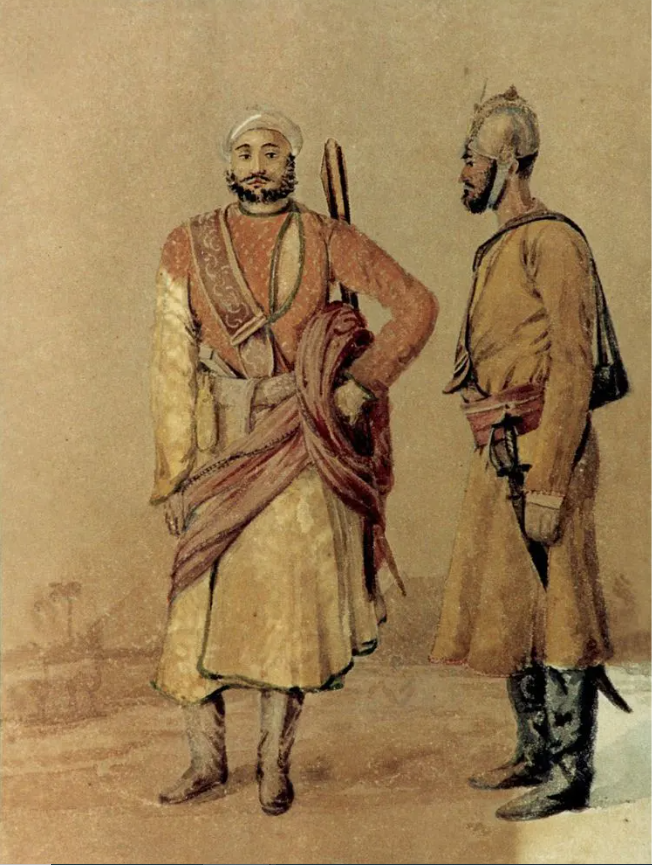
Police in Delhi under Bahadur Shah II, 1842

The Mughal Empire's legal system was context-specific and evolved throughout the empire's rule. Being a Muslim state, the empire employed fiqh (Islamic jurisprudence) and therefore the fundamental institutions of Islamic law such as those of the qadi (judge), mufti (jurisconsult), and muhtasib (censor and market supervisor) were well-established in the Mughal Empire. However, the dispensation of justice also depended on other factors, such as administrative rules, local customs, and political convenience. This was due to Persianate influences on Mughal ideology and that the Mughal Empire governed a non-Muslim majority. Scholar Mouez Khalfaoui notes that legal institutions in the Mughal Empire systemically suffered from the corruption of local judges.

==== Legal ideology ====
The Mughal Empire followed the Sunni Hanafi system of jurisprudence. In its early years, the empire relied on Hanafi legal references inherited from its predecessor, the Delhi Sultanate. These included the al-Hidayah (the best guidance) and the Fatawa al-Tatarkhaniyya (religious decisions of the Emire Tatarkhan). During the Mughal Empire's peak, the Fatawa 'Alamgiri was commissioned by Emperor Aurangzeb. This compendium of Hanafi law sought to serve as a central reference for the Mughal state that dealt with the specifics of the South Asian context.

The Mughal Empire also drew on Persian notions of kingship. Particularly, this meant that the Mughal emperor was considered the supreme authority on legal affairs.

==== Courts of law ====
Various kinds of courts existed in the Mughal Empire. One such court was that of the qadi. The Mughal qadi was responsible for dispensing justice; this included settling disputes, judging people for crimes, and dealing with inheritances and orphans. The qadi also had additional importance in documents, as the seal of the qadi was required to validate deeds and tax records. Qadis did not constitute a single position, but made up a hierarchy. For example, the most basic kind was the pargana (district) qadi. More prestigious positions were those of the qadi al-quddat (judge of judges) who accompanied the mobile imperial camp, and the qadi-yi lashkar (judge of the army). Qadis were usually appointed by the emperor or the sadr-us-sudr (chief of charities). The jurisdiction of the qadi was availed by Muslims and non-Muslims alike.

The jagirdar (local tax collector) was another kind of official approach, especially for high-stakes cases. Subjects of the Mughal Empire also took their grievances to the courts of superior officials, who held more authority and punitive power than the local qadi. Such officials included the kotwal (local police), the faujdar (an officer controlling multiple districts and troops of soldiers), and the most powerful, the subahdar (provincial governor). In some cases, the emperor dispensed justice directly. Jahangir was known to have installed a "chain of justice" in the Agra Fort that any aggrieved subject could shake to get the attention of the emperor and bypass the inefficacy of officials.

Self-regulating tribunals operating at the community or village level were common, but sparse documentation of them exists. For example, it is unclear how panchayats (village councils) operated in the Mughal era.

== Economy ==
The Mughal economy was large and prosperous. India was producing 24.5% of the world's manufacturing output up until 1750. Mughal India's economy has been described as a form of proto-industrialisation, like that of 18th-century Western Europe before the Industrial Revolution.

Modern historians and researchers generally agree that the character of the Mughal Empire's economic policy resembles the laissez-faire system in dealing with trade and billions to achieve the economic ends.

The Mughals were responsible for building an extensive road system and creating a uniform currency. The empire had an extensive road network, which was vital to the economic infrastructure, built by a public works department set up by the Mughals which designed, constructed and maintained roads linking towns and cities across the empire, making trade easier to conduct.

The main base of the empire's collective wealth was agricultural taxes, instituted by the third Mughal emperor, Akbar. These taxes, which amounted to well over half the output of a peasant cultivator, were paid in the well-regulated silver currency, and caused peasants and artisans to enter larger markets. In circa 1595, Modern historians estimated the state's annual revenues of the Mughal Empire were around 99,000,000 rupees.

=== Coinage ===
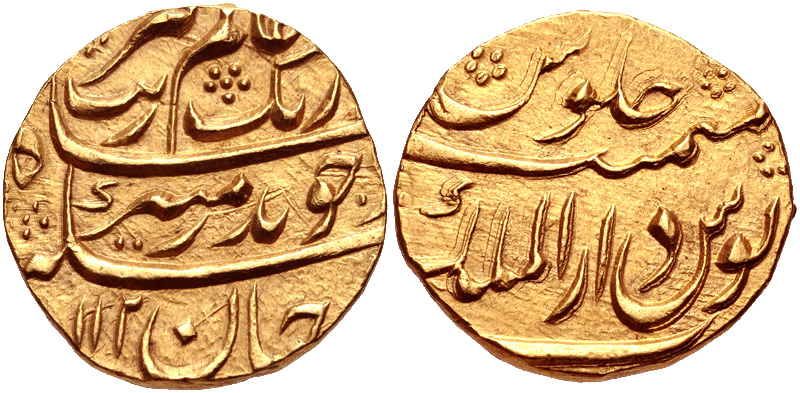
Coin of Aurangzeb, minted in Kabul, dated 1691/2

The Mughals adopted and standardised the rupee (rupiya, or silver) and dam (copper) currencies introduced by Sur Emperor Sher Shah Suri during his brief rule. The Mughals minted coins with high purity, never dropping below 96%, and without debasement until the 1720s.

Despite India having its stocks of gold and silver, the Mughals produced minimal gold of their own but mostly minted coins from imported bullion, as a result of the empire's strong export-driven economy, with global demand for Indian agricultural and industrial products drawing a steady stream of precious metals into India.

=== Labour ===
The historian Shireen Moosvi estimates that in terms of contributions to the Mughal economy, in the late 16th century, the primary sector contributed 52%, the secondary sector 18% and the tertiary sector 29%; the secondary sector contributed a higher percentage than in early 20th-century British India, where the secondary sector only contributed 11% to the economy. In terms of the urban-rural divide, 18% of Mughal India's labour force were urban and 82% were rural, contributing 52% and 48% to the economy, respectively.

According to Moosvi, Mughal India had a per-capita income, in terms of wheat, 1.24% higher in the late 16th century than British India did in the early 20th century. This income, however, would have to be revised downwards if manufactured goods, like clothing, would be considered. Compared to food per capita, expenditure on clothing was much smaller though, so relative income between 1595 and 1596 should be comparable to 1901–1910. However, in a system where wealth was hoarded by elites, wages were depressed for manual labour. While slavery also existed, it was limited largely to household servants. According to one study, however, measures aimed at protecting workers' rights were carried out during the course of the Mughal Empire, with one study noting that the Mughals “emphasized the importance of fair wages and the provision of necessities for workers, reflecting the broader Islamic principles of justice and equity.”

=== Agriculture ===
Indian agricultural production increased under the Mughal Empire. A variety of crops were grown, including food crops such as wheat, rice, and barley, and non-food cash crops such as cotton, indigo and opium. By the mid-17th century, Indian cultivators began to extensively grow two new crops from the Americas, maize and tobacco.

The Mughal administration emphasised the agrarian reform that began under the non-Mughal emperor Sher Shah Suri, which Akbar adopted and furthered with more reforms. The civil administration was organised hierarchically based on merit, with promotions based on performance. The Mughal government funded the building of irrigation systems across the empire, which produced much higher crop yields and increased the net revenue base, leading to increased agricultural production.

A major Mughal reform introduced by Akbar was a new land revenue system called zabt. He replaced the tribute system, previously common in India and used by Tokugawa Japan at the time, with a monetary tax system based on a uniform currency. The revenue system was biased in favour of higher value cash crops such as cotton, indigo, sugar cane, tree crops, and opium, providing state incentives to grow cash crops, in addition to rising market demand. Under the zabt system, the Mughals also conducted extensive cadastral surveying to assess the area of land under plough cultivation, with the Mughal state encouraging greater land cultivation by offering tax-free periods to those who brought new land under cultivation. The expansion of agriculture and cultivation continued under later Mughal emperors, including Aurangzeb.

Mughal agriculture was in some ways advanced compared to European agriculture at the time, exemplified by the common use of the seed drill among Indian peasants before its adoption in Europe. Geared sugar rolling mills first appeared in Mughal India, using the principle of rollers as well as worm gearing, by the 17th century.

=== Industrial manufacturing ===
South Asia during the Mughal's rule was a very fertile ground for manufacturing technologies coveted by the Europeans before the Industrial Revolution. Up until 1750, India produced about 25% of the world's industrial output.

Manufactured goods and cash crops from the Mughal Empire were sold throughout the world. The growth of manufacturing industries in the Indian subcontinent during the Mughal era in the 17th–18th centuries has been referred to as a form of proto-industrialisation, similar to 18th-century Western Europe before the Industrial Revolution.

In early modern Europe, there was significant demand for products from Mughal India, particularly cotton textiles, as well as goods such as spices, peppers, indigo, silks, and saltpetre (for use in munitions). European fashion, for example, became increasingly dependent on Mughal Indian textiles and silks.

==== Textile industry ====
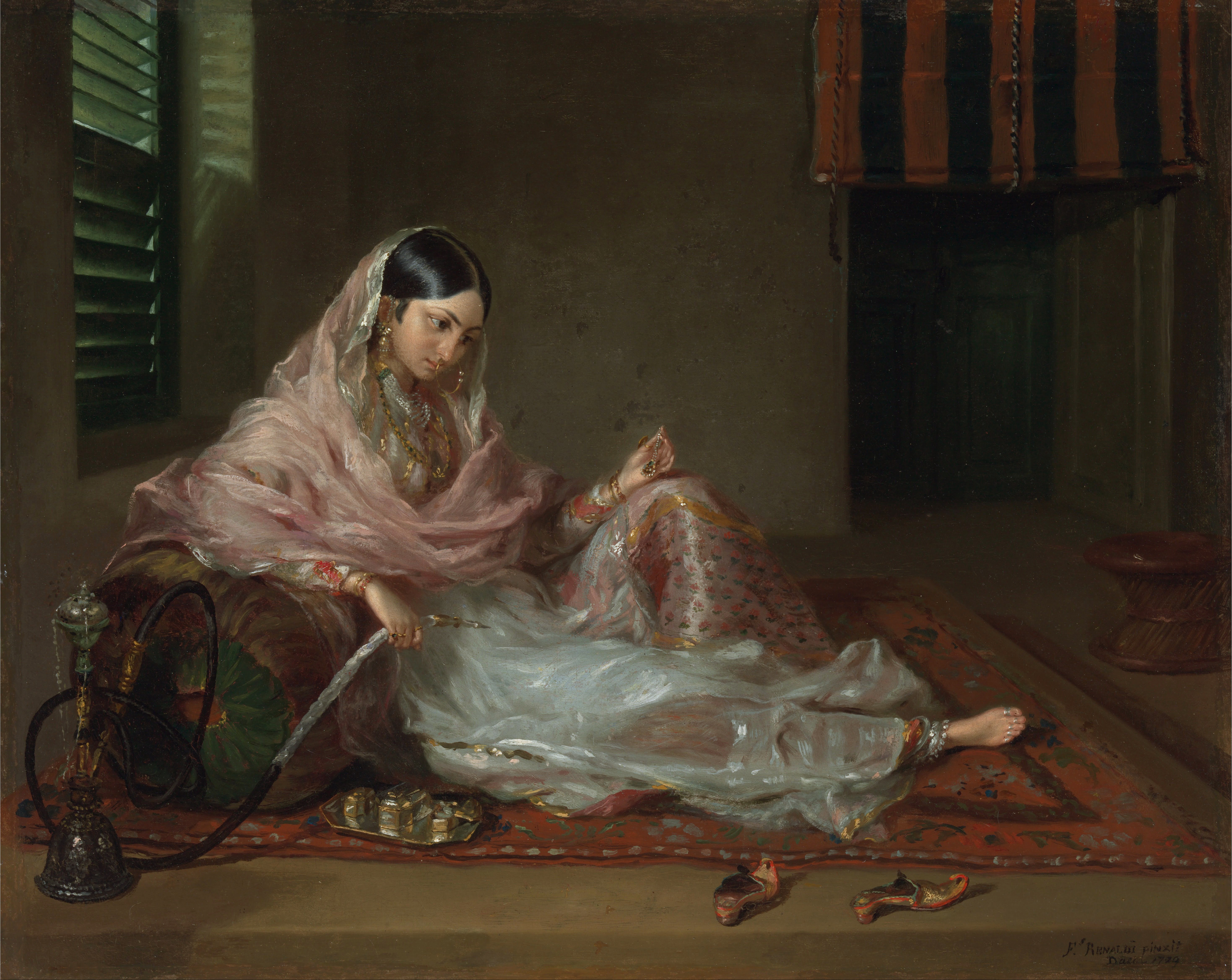
Muslim Lady Reclining or An Indian Girl with a Hookah, painted in Dacca, 18th century

The largest manufacturing industry in the Mughal Empire was textile manufacturing, particularly cotton textile manufacturing, which included the production of piece goods, calicos, and muslins. The cotton textile industry was responsible for a large part of the empire's international trade. India had a 25% share of the global textile trade in the early 18th century, and it represented the most important manufactured goods in world trade in the 18th century. The most important centre of cotton production was the Bengal province, particularly around its capital city of Dhaka.

The production of cotton was advanced by the diffusion of the spinning wheel across India shortly before the Mughal era, lowering the costs of yarn and helping to increase demand for cotton. The diffusion of the spinning wheel and the incorporation of the worm gear and crank handle into the roller cotton gin led to greatly expanded Indian cotton textile production during the Mughal era.

=== Bengal Subah ===
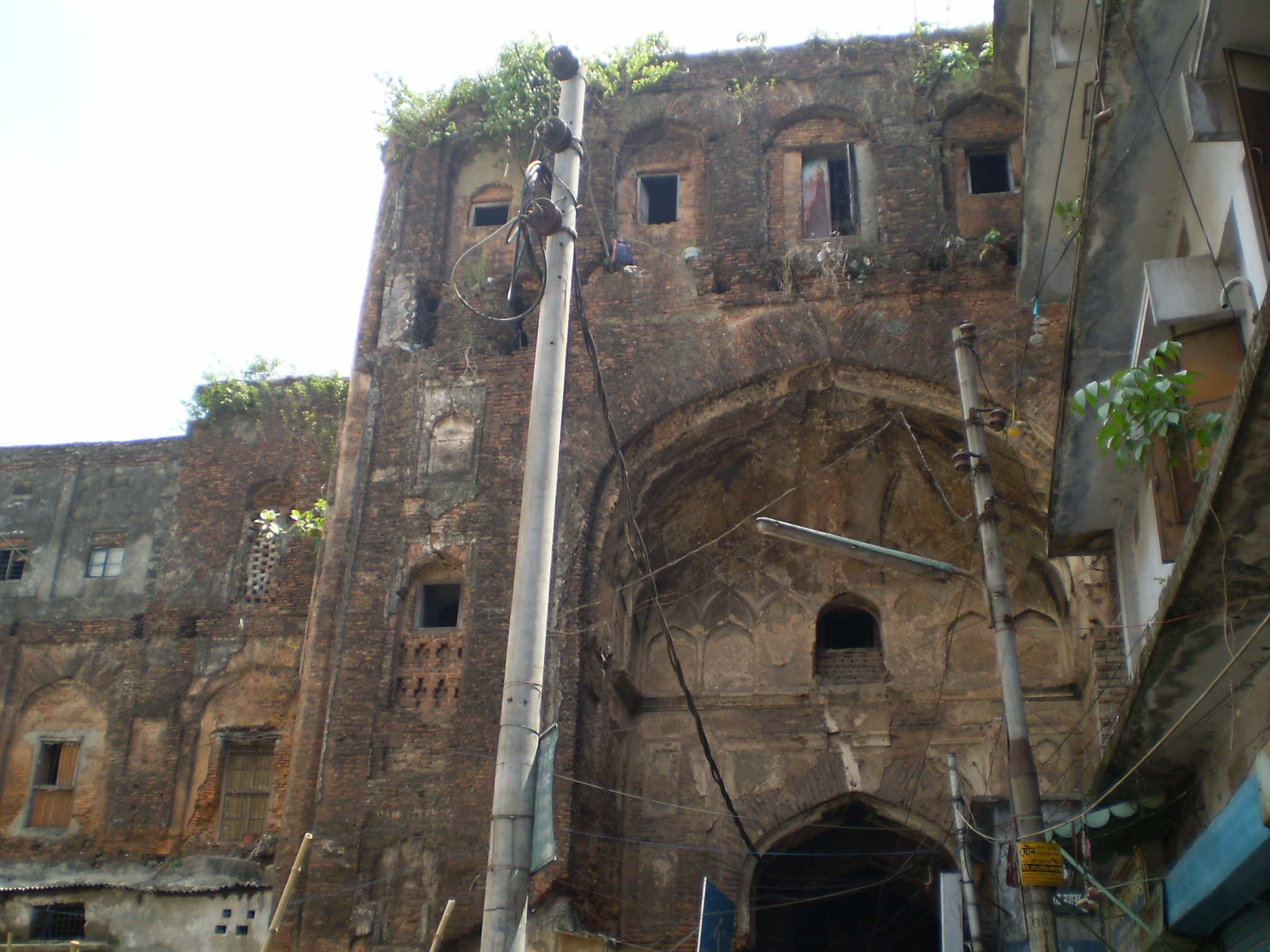
Ruins of the Great Caravanserai in Dhaka

The Bengal Subah province was especially prosperous from the time of its takeover by the Mughals in 1590 until the British East India Company seized control in 1757. Historian C. A. Bayly wrote that it was probably the Mughal Empire's wealthiest province. Domestically, much of India depended on Bengali products such as rice, silks and cotton textiles. Overseas, Europeans depended on Bengali products such as cotton textiles, silks, and opium. The province was a leading producer of grains, salt, fruits, liquors and wines, precious metals and ornaments.

After 150 years of rule by Mughal viceroys, Bengal gained de facto independence as a dominion under Murshid Quli Khan, the first Nawab of Bengal in 1717. The Nawabs permitted European companies to set up trading posts across the region, which regarded Bengal as the richest place for trade.

==== Shipbuilding industry ====
Mughal India had a large shipbuilding industry, which was also largely centred in the Bengal province. Economic historian Indrajit Ray estimates the shipbuilding output of Bengal during the sixteenth and seventeenth centuries at 223,250 tons annually, compared with 23,061 tons produced in nineteen colonies in North America from 1769 to 1771. He also assesses ship repairing as very advanced in Bengal.

== Demographics ==
=== Population ===
India's population growth accelerated under the Mughal Empire, with an unprecedented economic and demographic upsurge which boosted the Indian population by 60% to 253% in 200 years during 1500–1700. The Indian population had a faster growth during the Mughal era than at any known point in Indian history before the Mughal era. By the time of Aurangzeb's reign, there were a total of 455,698 villages in the Mughal Empire.

The following table gives population estimates for the Mughal Empire, compared to the total population of South Asia including the regions of modern India, Pakistan, and Bangladesh, and compared to the world population:

Year	Mughal Empire population	Total Indian population	% of South Asian population	World population	% of world population
1500	—	100,000,000	—	425,000,000	—
1600	115,000,000	130,000,000	89	579,000,000	20
1700	158,400,000	160,000,000	99	679,000,000	23

There was a notable presence of the Jewish diaspora in the Mughal empire. The Jewish community in the empire engaged in trading jewelry and precious stones. Sarmad Kashani engaged in religious activities in the Mughal court.

=== Urbanisation ===
According to Irfan Habib, cities and towns boomed under the Mughal Empire, which had a relatively high degree of urbanisation for its time, with 15% of its population living in urban centres. This was higher than the percentage of the urban population in contemporary Europe at the time and higher than that of British India in the 19th century; the level of urbanisation in Europe did not reach 15% until the 19th century.

Under Akbar's reign in 1600, the Mughal Empire's urban population was up to 17 million people, 15% of the empire's total population. This was larger than the entire urban population in Europe at the time, and even a century later in 1700, the urban population of England, Scotland and Wales did not exceed 13% of its total population, while British India had an urban population that was under 13% of its total population in 1800 and 9% in 1881, a decline from the earlier Mughal era. By 1700, Mughal India had an urban population of 23 million people, larger than British India's urban population of 22.3 million in 1871.

Those estimates were criticised by Tim Dyson, who considers them exaggerations. According to Dyson, urbanisation of the Mughal Empire was less than 9%.

The historian Nizamuddin Ahmad (1551–1621) reported that, under Akbar's reign, there were 120 large cities and 3200 townships. Several cities in India had a population between a quarter-million and half-million people, with larger cities including Agra (in Agra Subah) with up to 800,000 people, Lahore (in Lahore Subah) with up to 700,000 people, Dhaka (in Bengal Subah) with over 1 million people, and Delhi (in Delhi Subah) with over 600,000 people.

Cities acted as markets for the sale of goods, and provided homes for a variety of merchants, traders, shopkeepers, artisans, moneylenders, weavers, craftspeople, officials, and religious figures. However, several cities were military and political centres, rather than manufacturing or commerce centres.

== Culture ==
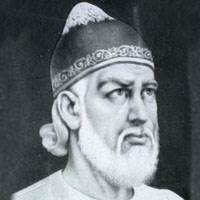
Ghulam Hamdani Mushafi, the poet first believed to have coined the name "Urdu" around 1780 AD for a language that went by a multiplicity of names before his time

Generally, classical historiographies depicted the Mughal Empire's origin as a sedentarised agrarian society. However, modern historians such as André Wink, Jos J. L. Gommans, Anatoly Khazanov, Thomas J. Barfield, and others, argued the Mughals originated from nomadic culture. Pius Malekandathil argued instead that although it was true that the Mughal had their origin as nomadic civilisation, they became more sendentarised as time passed, as exemplified by their military tradition. The Mughal Empire was definitive in the early-modern and modern periods of South Asian history, with its legacy in India, Pakistan, Bangladesh and Afghanistan seen in cultural contributions such as:

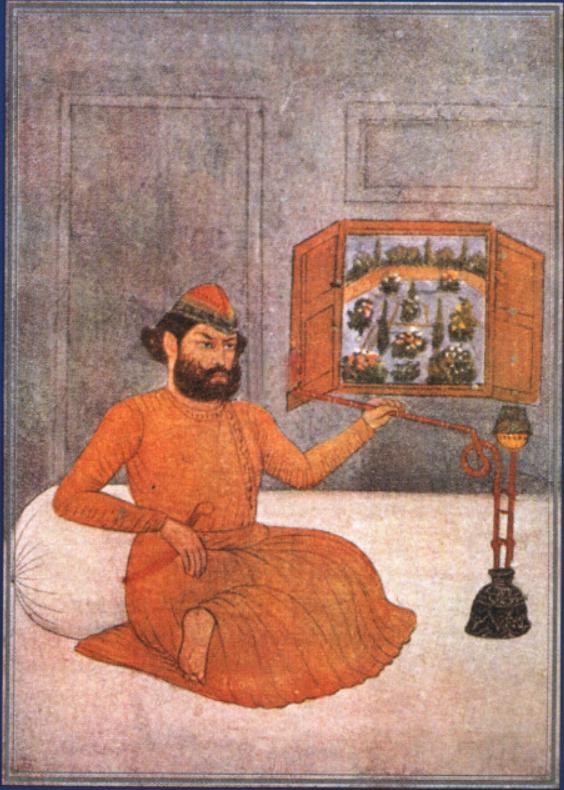
Mir Taqi Mir, an Urdu poet of the 18th century Mughal Empire

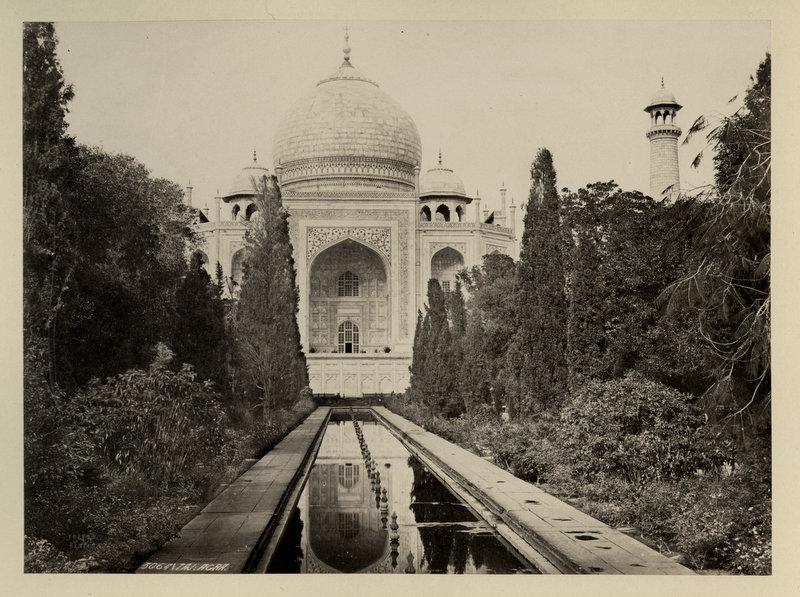
The Taj Mahal in the 1870s

- Centralised imperial rule that consolidated the smaller polities of South Asia.
- The amalgamation of Persian art and literature with Indian art.

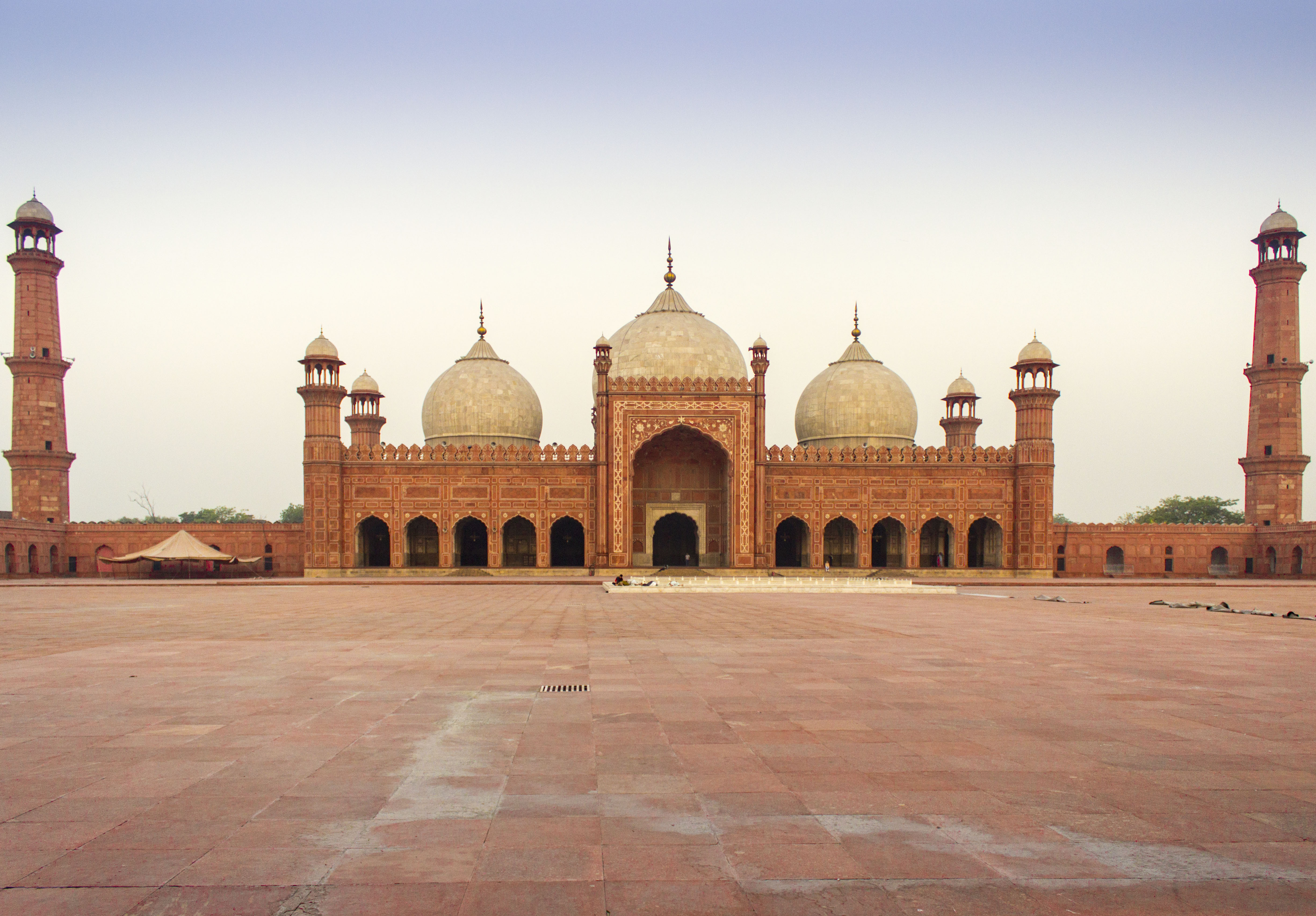
Badshahi Mosque, Lahore, Punjab, Pakistan

- The development of Mughlai cuisine, an amalgamation of South Asian, Iranian and Central Asian culinary styles.
- The development of Mughal clothing, jewellery and fashion, utilising richly decorated fabrics such as muslin, silk, brocade and velvet.
- The influence of the Persian language over Old Hindi led to the development of the Hindustani language.
- The introduction of sophisticated Iranian-style waterworks and horticulture through Mughal gardening.
- The introduction of hammams into the Indian subcontinent.
- The evolution and refinement of Mughal and Indian architecture, and, in turn, the development of later Rajput and Sikh palatial architecture. A famous Mughal landmark is the Taj Mahal.
- The development of the Pehlwani style of Indian wrestling, a combination of Indian malla-yuddha and Persian varzesh-e bastani.
- The construction of Maktab schools, where youth were taught the Quran and Islamic law such as the Fatawa 'Alamgiri in their indigenous languages.
- The development of Hindustani classical music, and instruments such as the sitar.

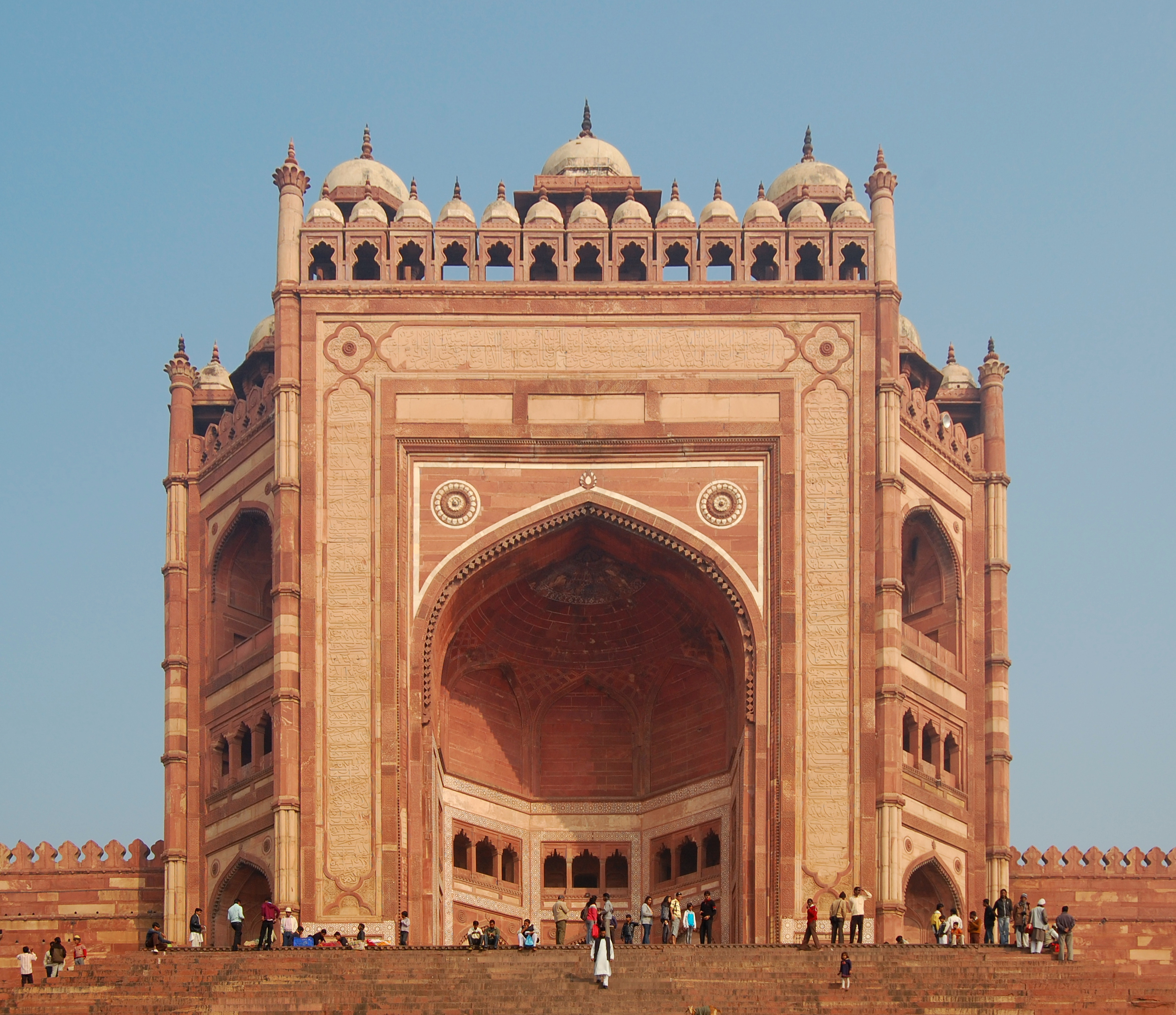
Buland Darwaza in Fatehpur Sikiri, Agra, India

=== Customs ===
The procession of marriage among the royals of the Mughal Empire was recorded with many reports of extravagant gifts. One occasion was during the marriage of a son of emperor Akbar, Salim, with the daughter of a ruler of Bijapur, Raja Bhagwant Das, where the gift presented by Bhagwant Das consisted of many horses, 100 elephants, many male and female slaves of Abyssinian, Caucasian, and native Indian origins, who brought with them various gold and silver utensils as dowry.

=== Architecture ===
The Mughals made a major contribution to the Indian subcontinent with the development of their distinctive architectural style. This style was derived from earlier Indo-Islamic architecture as well as from Iranian and Central Asian architecture (particularly Timurid architecture), while incorporating further influences from Hindu architecture. Mughal architecture is distinguished, among other things, by bulbous domes, ogive arches, carefully-composed and polished façades, and the use of hard red sandstone and marble as construction materials.

Furthermore, William Dalrymple mentioned that during the final days of the Mughal fall of Delhi in 1857, an ice house structure existed in Delhi. Emperor Shah Jahan has recorded establishing an ice-house in Sirmaur, north of Delhi.

Many monuments were built during the Mughal era by the Muslim emperors, especially Shah Jahan, including the Taj Mahal—a UNESCO World Heritage Site considered "the jewel of Muslim art in India and one of the universally admired masterpieces of the world's heritage", attracting 7–8 million unique visitors a year. The palaces, tombs, gardens and forts built by the dynasty stand today in Agra, Aurangabad, Delhi, Dhaka, Fatehpur Sikri, Jaipur, Lahore, Kabul, Sheikhupura, and many other cities of India, Pakistan, Afghanistan, and Bangladesh, such as:

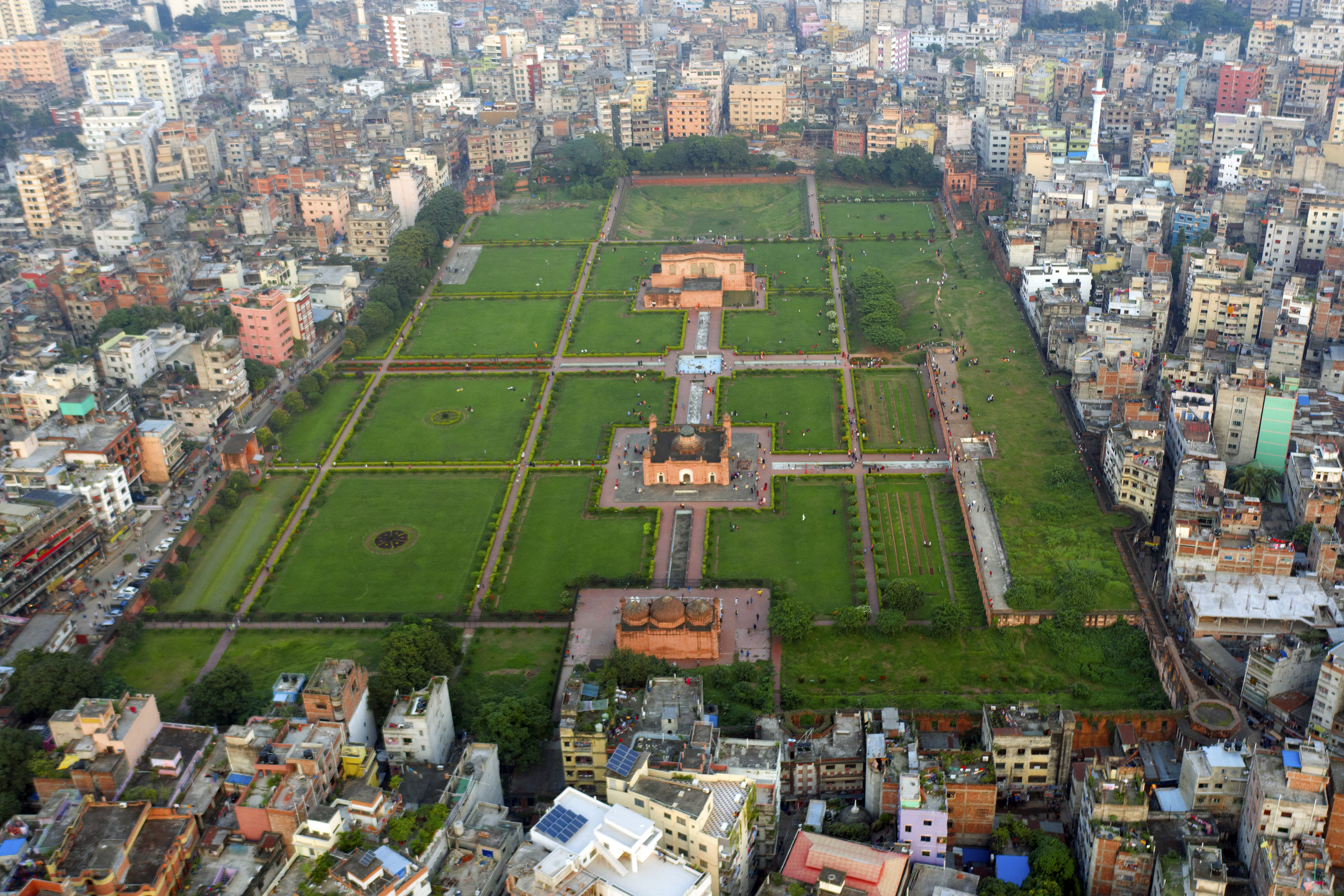
Lalbagh Fort aerial view in Dhaka, Bangladesh

India	Pakistan	Bangladesh	Afghanistan
Taj Mahal in Agra, India; Agra Fort in Agra, India; Buland Darwaza in Agra, India; Akbar's tomb in Sikandra, India; Tomb of Mariam-uz-Zamani in Sikandra, India; Humayun's Tomb in Delhi, India; Jama Masjid in Delhi, India; Red Fort in Delhi, India; Sunder Nursery in Delhi, India; Purana Qila in Delhi, India; Sher Mandal in Delhi, India; Pinjore Gardens in Pinjore, India; Shalimar Bagh in Srinagar, India; Nishat Bagh in Srinagar, India; Chasma Shahi in Srinagar, India; Pari Mahal in Srinagar, India; Verinag Gardens in Srinagar, India; Allahabad Fort in Prayagraj, India; Shahi Bridge in Jaunpur, India; Bibi Ka Maqbara in Aurangabad, India; Kos Minar in Haryana, India; Baoli Ghaus Ali Shah in Farrukhnagar, India	Badshahi Masjid in Lahore, Pakistan; Shalimar Gardens in Lahore, Pakistan; Lahore Fort in Lahore, Pakistan; Shahi Hammam in Lahore, Pakistan; Wazir Khan Mosque in Lahore, Pakistan; Tomb of Jahangir in Lahore, Pakistan; Tomb of Anarkali in Lahore, Pakistan; Tomb of Nur Jahan in Lahore, Pakistan; Tomb of Asif Khan in Lahore, Pakistan; Begum Shahi Mosque in Lahore, Pakistan; Akbari Sarai in Lahore, Pakistan; Hiran Minar in Sheikhpura, Pakistan; Mahabat Khan Mosque in Peshawar, Pakistan; Shahi Eid Gah Mosque in Multan, Pakistan; Mausoleum of Masum Shah in Sukkur, Pakistan; Losar Baoli in Taxila, Pakistan; Makli Necropolis in Thatta, Pakistan; Shah Jahan Mosque in Thatta, Pakistan	Mughal Eidgah in Dhaka, Bangladesh; Lalbagh Fort in Dhaka, Bangladesh; Shahi Eidgah in Sylhet, Bangladesh; Mughal Tahakhana in Chapai Nawabganj, Bangladesh; Sat Gambuj Mosque in Dhaka, Bangladesh; Masjid-e-Siraj ud-Daulah in Chittagong, Bangladesh; Allakuri Masjid in Dhaka, Bangladesh; Chawkbazar Shahi Masjid in Dhaka, Bangladesh; Laldighi Masjid in Rangpur, Bangladesh; Khan Mohammad Mridha Masjid in Dhaka, Bangladesh; Wali Khan Masjid in Chittagong, Bangladesh; Shaista Khan Masjid, in Dhaka, Bangladesh; Musa Khan Masjid, in Dhaka, Bangladesh; Shahbaz Khan Masjid, in Dhaka, Bangladesh; Kartalab Khan Masjid in Dhaka, Bangladesh; Azimpur Masjid in Dhaka, Bangladesh; Goaldi Masjid in Sonargaon, Bangladesh; Atia Masjid in Tangail, Bangladesh; Arifail Masjid in Brahmanbaria, Bangladesh; Bazra Shahi Masjid in Noakhali, Bangladesh; Masjid Kur in Khulna, Bangladesh; Nayabad Masjid in Dinajpur, Bangladesh; Ghayebi Dighi Masjid in Sylhet, Bangladesh; Hussaini Dalan in Dhaka, Bangladesh; Bara Katra in Dhaka, Bangladesh; Hajiganj Fort in Narayanganj, Bangladesh; Idrakpur Fort in Munshiganj, Bangladesh; Choto Katra in Dhaka, Bangladesh; Sonakanda Fort in Narayanganj, Bangladesh	Bagh-e-Babur in Kabul, Afghanistan; Shahjahani Mosque in Kabul, Afghanistan

=== Art and literature ===
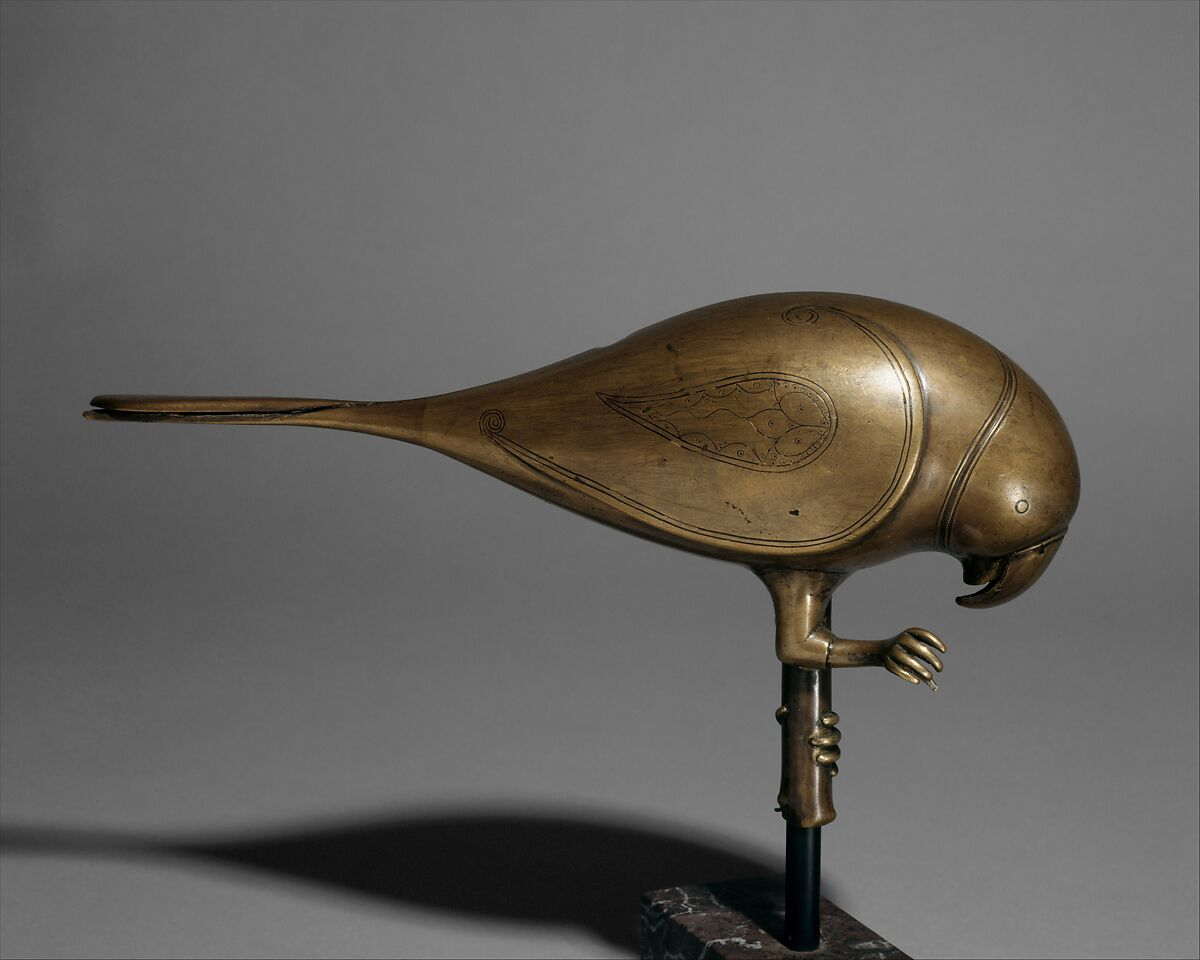
Finial in the form of a parrot, Mughal Empire, 17th century

The Mughal artistic tradition, mainly expressed in painted miniatures, as well as small luxury objects, was eclectic, borrowing from Iranian, Indian, Chinese and Renaissance European stylistic and thematic elements. Mughal emperors often took in Iranian bookbinders, illustrators, painters and calligraphers from the Safavid court due to the commonalities of their Timurid styles, and due to the Mughal affinity for Iranian art and calligraphy. Miniatures commissioned by the Mughal emperors initially focused on large projects illustrating books with eventful historical scenes and court life, but later included more single images for albums, with portraits and animal paintings displaying a profound appreciation for the serenity and beauty of the natural world. For example, Emperor Jahangir commissioned brilliant artists such as Ustad Mansur to realistically portray unusual flora and fauna throughout the empire.

The literary works Akbar and Jahangir ordered to be illustrated ranged from epics like the Razmnama (a Persian translation of the Hindu epic, the Mahabharata) to historical memoirs or biographies of the dynasty such as the Baburnama and Akbarnama, and Tuzk-e-Jahangiri. Richly finished albums (muraqqa) decorated with calligraphy and artistic scenes were mounted onto pages with decorative borders and then bound with covers of stamped and gilded or painted and lacquered leather. Aurangzeb (1658–1707) was never an enthusiastic patron of painting, largely for religious reasons, and took a turn away from the pomp and ceremonial of the court around 1668, after which he probably commissioned no more paintings.

Folio from Farhang-i-Jahangiri, a Persian dictionary compiled during the Mughal era

=== Language ===
Though the Mughals were of Turko-Mongol origin, their reign enacted the revival and height of the Persian language in the Indian subcontinent, and by the end of the 16th-century Turki (Chagatai) was understood by relatively few at court. Accompanied by literary patronage was the institutionalisation of Persian as an official and courtly language; this led to Persian reaching nearly the status of a first language for many inhabitants of Mughal India. Historian Muzaffar Alam argues that the Mughals used Persian purposefully as the vehicle of an overarching Indo-Persian political culture, to unite their diverse empire. Persian had a profound impact on the languages of South Asia; one such language, today known as Hindustani, developed in the imperial capital of Delhi in the late Mughal era. It began to be used as a literary language in the Mughal court from the reign of Shah Jahan, who described it as the language of his dastans (prose romances) and replaced Persian as the informal language of the Muslim elite. According to contemporary poet Mir Taqi Mir, "Urdu was the language of Hindustan by the authority of the King."

== Military ==
=== Gunpowder warfare ===
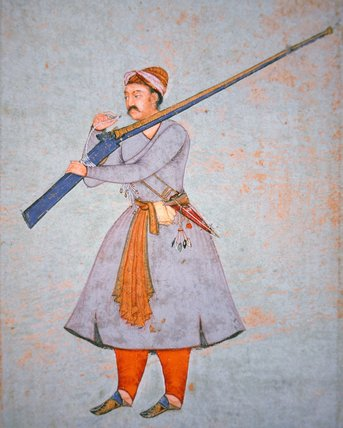
Mughal matchlock rifle, 16th century

Mughal India was one of the three Islamic gunpowder empires, along with the Ottoman Empire and Safavid Persia. By the time he was invited by Lodi governor of Lahore, Daulat Khan, to support his rebellion against Lodi Sultan Ibrahim Khan, Babur was familiar with gunpowder firearms and field artillery, and a method for deploying them. Babur had employed Ottoman expert Ustad Ali Quli, who showed Babur the standard Ottoman formation—artillery and firearm-equipped infantry protected by wagons in the centre and the mounted archers on both wings. Babur used this formation at the First Battle of Panipat in 1526, where the Afghan and Rajput forces loyal to the Delhi Sultanate, though superior in numbers but without the gunpowder weapons, were defeated. The decisive victory of the Timurid forces is one reason opponents rarely met Mughal princes in pitched battles throughout the empire's history. In India, guns made of bronze were recovered from Calicut (1504) and Diu (1533). Fathullah Shirazi (c. 1582), a Persian polymath and mechanical engineer who worked for Akbar, developed an early multi-gun shot. As opposed to the polybolos and repeating crossbows used earlier in ancient Greece and China, respectively, Shirazi's rapid-firing gun had multiple gun barrels that fired hand cannons loaded with gunpowder. It may be considered a version of a volley gun.

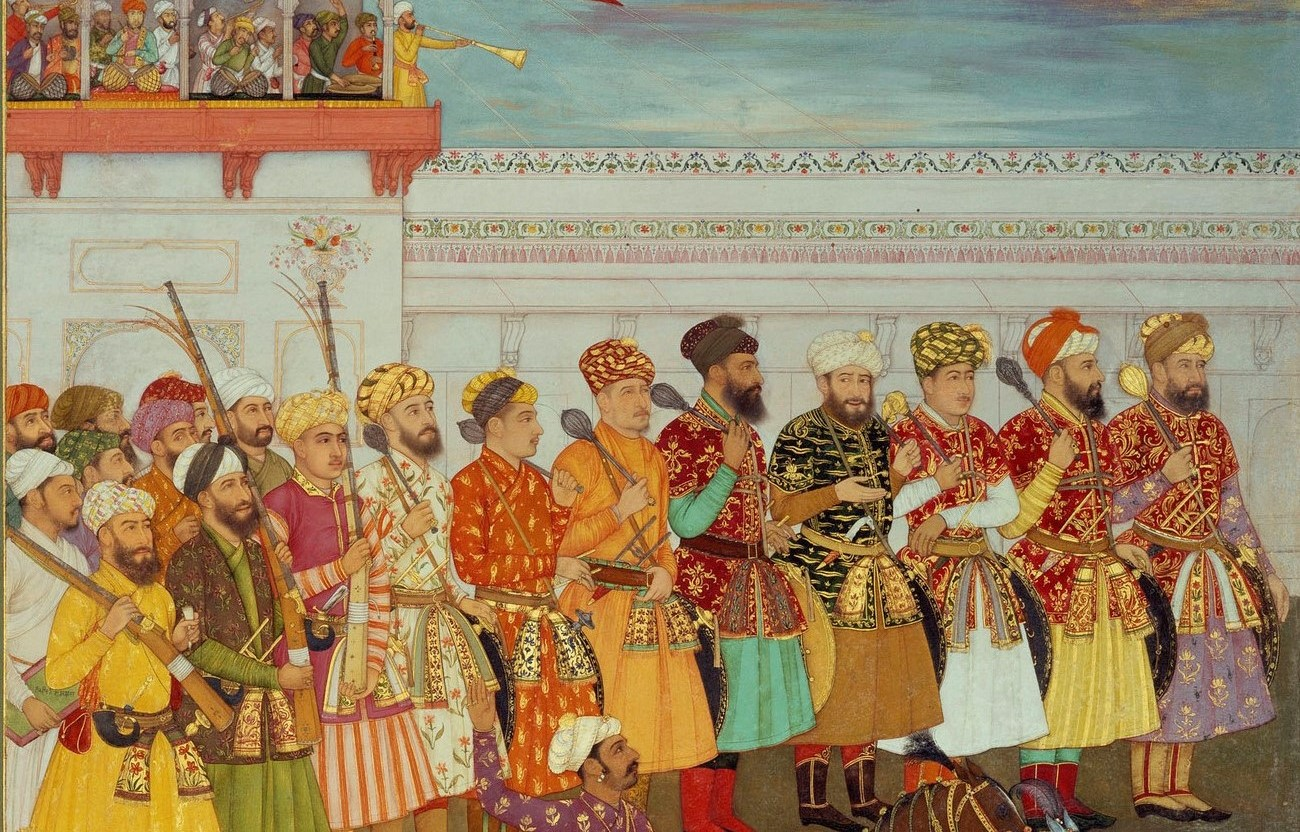
Mughal musketeer, 17th century

By the 17th century, Indians were manufacturing a diverse variety of firearms; large guns, in particular, became visible in Tanjore, Dacca, Bijapur and Murshidabad.

=== Rocketry and explosives ===
In the sixteenth century, Akbar was the first to initiate and use metal cylinder rockets known as bans, particularly against war elephants, during the battle of Sanbal. In 1657, the Mughal Army used rockets during the siege of Bidar. Prince Aurangzeb's forces discharged rockets and grenades while scaling the walls. Sidi Marjan was mortally wounded when a rocket struck his large gunpowder depot, and after twenty-seven days of hard fighting, Bidar was captured by the Mughals.

In A History of Greek Fire and Gunpowder, James Riddick Partington described Indian rockets and explosive mines:

The Indian war rockets ... were formidable weapons before such rockets were used in Europe. They had bam-boo rods, a rocket body lashed to the rod and iron points. They were directed at the target and fired by lighting the fuse, but the trajectory was rather erratic. The use of mines and counter-mines with explosive charges of gunpowder is mentioned for the times of Akbar and Jahangir.

== Science ==
A new curriculum for the madrasas that stressed the importance of uloom-i-muqalat (Rational Sciences) and introduced new subjects such as geometry, medicine, philosophy, and mathematics. The new curriculum produced a series of eminent scholars, engineers and architects.

=== Astronomy ===
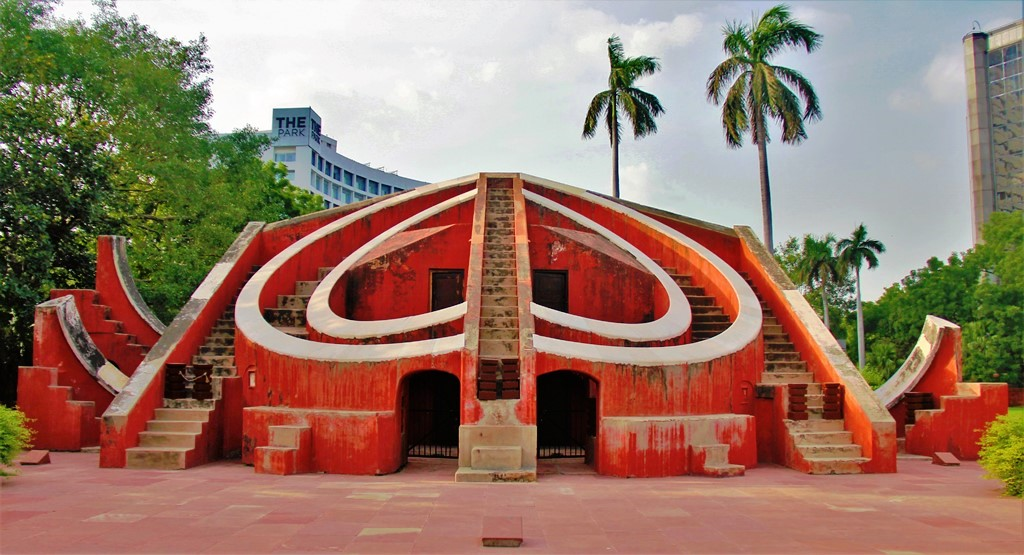
Jantar Mantar in Delhi, built by Jai Singh II

While there appears to have been little concern for theoretical astronomy, Mughal astronomers made advances in observational astronomy and produced some Zij treatises. Humayun built a personal observatory near Delhi. According to Sulaiman Nadvi, Jahangir and Shah Jahan intended to build observatories too, but were unable to do so. The astronomical instruments and observational techniques used at the Mughal observatories were mainly derived from Islamic astronomy. In the 17th century, the Mughal Empire saw a synthesis between Islamic and Hindu astronomy, where Islamic observational instruments were combined with Hindu computational techniques.

During the decline of the Mughal Empire, the Hindu king Jai Singh II of Amber continued the work of Mughal astronomy. In the early 18th century, he built several large observatories called Yantra Mandirs, to rival Ulugh Beg's Samarkand observatory, and to improve on the earlier Hindu computations in the Siddhantas and Islamic observations in Zij-i-Sultani. The instruments he used were influenced by Islamic astronomy, while the computational techniques were derived from Hindu astronomy.

=== Metallurgy ===
Seamless celestial globe by Muhammad Saleh Thattvi with Arabic and Sanskrit inscriptions, dated AH 1074 (1663–4 CE), Khalili Collection of Islamic Art

Karkhanas were workshops in which craftsmen produced arms, ammunition, and also various items for the court and emperor. These included such as clothes, shawls, turbans, jewelry, gold and silverware, perfumes, medicines, carpets, beddings, tents, and for the imperial stable-harnesses for the horses in irons, copper and other metals.

A great majority of the surviving astrolabes from this period were made by seven members of one family who were based in Lahore. A 2006 metallurgical study of eight astrolabes, including six from the Lahore family, found that they used high-zinc brass. This required a more advanced manufacturing process than normal brass, but was easier to work into a thin sheet. The high-zinc process was not used at industrial scale in Europe until the nineteenth century. The study of the Lahore astrolabes suggests that it was in use in the Mughal Empire at the start of the seventeenth century.

Another aspect of the remarkable invention in Mughal India is the lost-wax cast, hollow, seamless, celestial globe. It was invented in Kashmir by Ali Kashmiri ibn Luqman in 998 AH (1589–90 CE). Twenty other such globes were later produced in Lahore and Kashmir during the Mughal Empire. Before they were rediscovered in the 1980s, it was believed by modern metallurgists to be technically impossible to produce hollow metal globes without any seams. Two members of the Lahore family of astrolabists, Qaim Muhammad and his son Diya' ad-din Muhammad, were among the makers of seamless celestial globes.

== List of emperors ==
Portrait	Titular Name	Birth Name	Birth	Reign	Death
1	Babur بابر	Zahir al-Din Muhammad ظهیر الدین محمد	14 February 1483 Andijan, Uzbekistan	20 April 1526 – 26 December 1530	26 December 1530 (aged 47) Agra, India
2	Humayun همایوں	Nasir al-Din Muhammad نصیر الدین محمد	6 March 1508 Kabul, Afghanistan	26 December 1530 – 17 May 1540 22 February 1555 – 27 January 1556 (10 years 3 months 25 days)	27 January 1556 (aged 47) Delhi, India
3	Akbar اکبر	Jalal al-Din Muhammad جلال الدین محمد	15 October 1542 Umerkot, Pakistan	11 February 1556 – 27 October 1605 (49 years 9 months 0 days)	27 October 1605 (aged 63) Agra, India
4	Jahangir جهانگیر	Nur al-Din Muhammad نور الدین محمد	31 August 1569 Agra, India	3 November 1605 – 28 October 1627 (21 years 11 months 23 days)	28 October 1627 (aged 58) Bhimber, Azad Kashmir, Pakistan
5	Shah Jahan شاہ جهان	Shihab al-Din Muhammad شهاب الدین محمد	5 January 1592 Lahore, Pakistan	19 January 1628 – 31 July 1658 (30 years 8 months 25 days)	22 January 1666 (aged 74) Agra, India
6	Aurangzeb اورنگزیب Alamgir عالمگیر	Muhi al-Din Muhammad محی الدین محمد	3 November 1618 Gujarat, India	31 July 1658 – 3 March 1707 (48 years 7 months 0 days)	3 March 1707 (aged 88) Ahmednagar, India
7	Azam Shah اعظم شاه	Qutb al-Din Muhammad قطب الدين محمد	28 June 1653 Burhanpur, India	14 March 1707 – 20 June 1707	20 June 1707 (aged 53) Agra, India
8	Bahadur Shah بهادر شاہ	Qutb al-Din Muhammad قطب الدین محمد	14 October 1643 Burhanpur, India	19 June 1707 – 27 February 1712 (4 years, 253 days)	27 February 1712 (aged 68) Lahore, Pakistan
9	Jahandar Shah جهاندار شاہ	Muiz al-Din Muhammad معز الدین محمد	9 May 1661 Deccan, India	27 February 1712 – 11 February 1713 (0 years, 350 days)	12 February 1713 (aged 51) Delhi, India
10	Farrukh Siyar فرخ سیر	Muin al-Din Muhammad موئن الدین محمد; Puppet King Under the Sayyids of Barha	20 August 1685 Aurangabad, India	11 January 1713 – 28 February 1719 (6 years, 48 days)	19 April 1719 (aged 33) Delhi, India
11	Rafi ud-Darajat رفیع الدرجات	Shams al-Din Muhammad شمس الدین محمد; Puppet King Under the Sayyids of Barha	1 December 1699	28 February 1719 – 6 June 1719 (0 years, 98 days)	6 June 1719 (aged 19) Agra, India
12	Shah Jahan II شاہ جهان دوم	Rafi al-Din Muhammad رفع الدين محمد; Puppet King Under the Sayyids of Barha	5 January 1696	6 June 1719 – 17 September 1719 (0 years, 105 days)	18 September 1719 (aged 23) Agra, India
13	Muhammad Shah محمد شاه	Nasir al-Din Muhammad نصیر الدین محمد	7 August 1702 Ghazni, Afghanistan	27 September 1719 – 26 April 1748 (28 years, 212 days)	26 April 1748 (aged 45) Delhi, India
14	Ahmad Shah Bahadur احمد شاہ بهادر	Mujahid al-Din Muhammad مجاهد الدین محمد	23 December 1725 Delhi, India	29 April 1748 – 2 June 1754 (6 years, 37 days)	1 January 1775 (aged 49) Delhi, India
15	Alamgir II عالمگیر دوم	Aziz al-Din Muhammad عزیز اُلدین محمد	6 June 1699 Burhanpur, India	3 June 1754 – 29 November 1759 (5 years, 180 days)	29 November 1759 (aged 60) Kotla Fateh Shah, India
16	Shah Jahan III شاه جهان سوم	Muhi al-Millat محی الملت	1711	10 December 1759 – 10 October 1760 (282 days)	1772 (aged 60–61)
17	Shah Alam II شاه عالم دوم	Jalal al-Din Muhammad Ali Gauhar جلال الدین علی گوهر	25 June 1728 Delhi, India	10 October 1760 – 31 July 1788 (27 years, 301 days)	19 November 1806 (aged 78) Delhi, India
18	Jahan Shah جهان شاه	Bidar Bakht Mahmud Shah Bahadur Jahan Shah بیدار بخت محمود شاه بهادر جهان شاہ; Puppet King Under Ghulam Qadir Rohilla	1749 Delhi, India	31 July 1788 – 11 October 1788 (63 days)	1790 (aged 40–41) Delhi, India
17	Shah Alam II شاه عالم دوم	Jalal al-Din Muhammad Ali Gauhar جلال الدین علی گوهر; Puppet monarch under the Maratha Confederacy	25 June 1728 Delhi, India	16 October 1788 – 19 November 1806 (18 years, 339 days)	19 November 1806 (aged 78) Delhi, India
19	Akbar Shah II اکبر شاه دوم	Muin al-Din Muhammad میرزا اکبر; Puppet King under the East India Company	22 April 1760 Mukundpur, India	19 November 1806 – 28 September 1837 (30 years, 321 days)	28 September 1837 (aged 77) Delhi, India
20	Bahadur Shah II Zafar بهادر شاه ظفر	Abu Zafar Siraj al-Din Muhammad ابو ظفر سراج اُلدین محمد	24 October 1775 Delhi, India	28 September 1837 – 21 September 1857 (19 years, 360 days)	7 November 1862 (aged 87) Rangoon, Myanmar

== See also ==
- History of India
- Flags of the Mughal Empire
- Foreign relations of the Mughal Empire
- List of Mongol states
- Mughal-Mongol genealogy
- Islam in South Asia
- NCERT textbook controversies
