= Piet Emmer =

Dutch Historian, Emeritus Professor

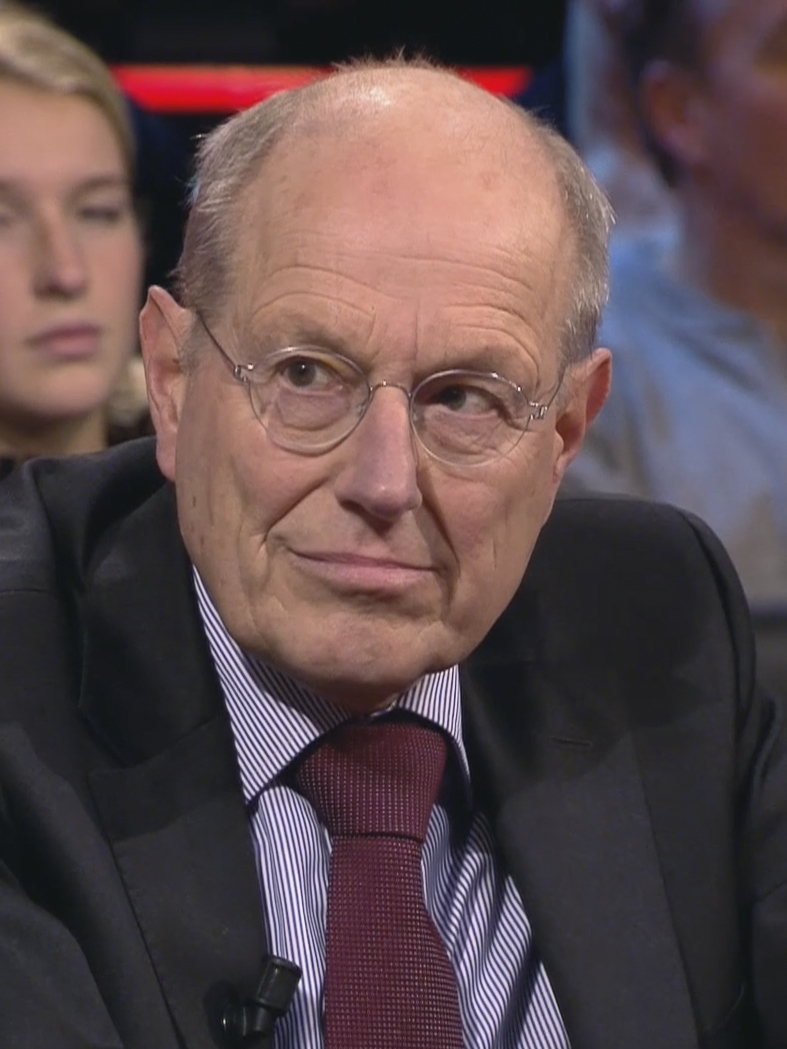
- Piet Emmer (2018)
- Born: Pieter Cornelis Emmer; October 17, 1944 (age 82); Haarlem, Netherlands
- Education: Leiden University
- Occupations: Emeritus professor, author
- Known for: The Dutch slave trade 1500–1850
- Title: Emeritus professor
- Website: Academic Website

Pieter Cornelis (Piet) Emmer (born October 17, 1944) is a Dutch Emeritus professor of Colonial History at Leiden University, specialising in the European Expansion, and related themes of slavery and immigration.

== Scholarship ==
Prof Piet Emmer studied history and economics in Leiden. He worked at the University of Amsterdam (Faculty of Economic Sciences) where he obtained his PhD in 1974 with the thesis 'England, the Netherlands, Africa and the slave trade in the nineteenth century'. He then worked at Leiden University until 2009, as full professor of the history of European expansion and related migration and slavery. In addition, he was an associate professor at the University of Amsterdam, Faculty of Economics and Business Administration, from 1 September 2005 to 1 September 2007. He was also a Visiting Fellow at Churchill College in Cambridge, the Berlin Institute for Advanced Study and the Netherlands Institute for Advanced Study in Wassenaar. As visiting professor, he was associated and taught at the University of Texas in Austin, the Universität Hamburg and the Université de Bretagne-Sud. He was a Member of the Editorial Board of the Journal of Imperial and Commonwealth History and Journal of Caribbean History. His best-known book is The Dutch Slave Trade 1500–1850. In 2009, he retired.

== Dutch slave trade ==
In the public debate on the Dutch slave trade, Emmer takes a relativistic position. For years Emmer was considered the slavery expert in the Netherlands, but his perspective has been criticized in the public debate. In publications, he emphasizes the role that inhabitants of the African continent had in the transatlantic slave trade. Emmer also put into perspective the profitability of the Dutch slave trade, calculating that the Dutch slave trade accounted for only 0.005 percent of national income, citing that many slaves died during the journey from Africa to the New World. He also argued that the Dutch slave trade was the only one that ceased to exist for economic reasons.

In 2013, in an article in newspaper Trouw, he argued that the slaves did not always fare as badly as things were presented by abolitionists at the time: the slave owners (e.g. plantation directors and overseers) were reluctant to use corporal punishment and rape because they did not want to risk conflict with the slaves given the possible consequences, also they were fed relatively well compared to the poor population in Western Europe and Africa who suffered from famines. Speaking on the radio programme 1 on 1, he said, "You also have to realise that they would not have been free either if they had stayed in Africa. They had already been enslaved."

Emmer's research into the Dutch history of slavery meets with resistance from time to time. His book on the history of slavery was received critically by the National Platform Slavery Past, among others. One objection was that Emmer estimated the Dutch Republic's share of the transatlantic slave trade at five per cent. His assertion that development aid is incompatible with development also caused a stir.

=== Dutch Slavery Museum ===
Asked if he will be involved in the new National Slavery Museum in Amsterdam, he replied, "I have not been asked. Maybe I'm too old or too controversial." Emmer does have all sorts of ideas about the layout of the new museum: he would like to see documentation on slavery from the West Indies, the Antilles and Surinam, combined with African slavery, Asia and the Dutch East Indies. This, he says, would illuminate slavery from many sides.

== Selected publications ==
- P.C. Emmer & Jos J.L. Gommans: The Dutch overseas empire, 1600–1800. Cambridge, Cambridge University Press, 2021. ISBN 9781108428378
- Who abolished slavery? Slave Revolts and Abolitionism. A Debate with João Pedro Marques. Edited by Seymour Drescher and Pieter C. Emmer. New York, Berghahn Books, 2010. ISBN 9781845456368
- P.C. Emmer & O. Pétré-Grenouilleau: A "deus ex machina" revisited. Atlantic colonial trade and European economic development. Leiden, Brill, 2006. ISBN 9789004151024
- P.C. Emmer: The Dutch slave trade, 1500–1850. New York, NY, Berghahn Books, 2006. ISBN 1845450310
- P.C. Emmer: The Dutch in the Atlantic economy, 1580–1880. Trade, slavery and emancipation. Aldershot, Ashgate, 1998. ISBN 0860786978
- P.C. Emmer & E. van den Boogaart: Colonialism and migration. Indentured labour before and after slavery. Dordrecht, Nijhoff, 1986. ISBN 9024732530
