= Mir Khalifa =

Mughal grand vizier from 1526 to 1540

Amir Nizam-ud-din Khalifa Mir Khan Wazir-ul-Mamalik

Vakil of the Mughal Empire (Grand vizier)
- In office 21 April 1526 – 17 May 1540
- Monarchs: Babur; Humayun
- Preceded by: Position established
- Succeeded by: Qaracha Khan

Personal details
- Children: Mohib Ali

Military service
- Allegiance: Mughal Empire
- Battles/wars: First Battle of Panipat; Battle of Khanwa

Amir Nizam-ud-din Khalifa (Persian: امیر نظام الدین خلیفه), also known as Mir Khalifa, was a Mughal noble and statesman, who served as the Vakil of the Mughal Empire (prime minister or Grand Vizier) during the reign of the Emperors Babur and Humayun.

== Biography ==
Mir Khalifa was one of the closet companions of Babur. In 1526 Babur established the Mughal Empire after defeating Ibrahim Lodhi in the Battle of Panipat. Emperor Babur created the ministry of Vakalat (Emperor's representative) and made Mir Khalifa the first Vakil of the Mughal Empire.

Mir Khalifa along with his son Mir Mohib Ali commanded the battalions of Mughal army in both battles of Panipat and Khanwa. His son fought bravely in the battle of Khanwa and impressed the Emperor. Due to Mohib's bravery Babur made him vizier in the imperial court.

Mir Khalifa initially opposed Humayun's succession to the Mughal Throne after the death of Babur because he was fearful and suspicious of the young prince Humayun. He was in favour of succession of Mahdi Khawaja who was a son-in-law of late Emperor.

He thought that Mahdi Khawaja was a generous and liberal man but after knowing of the great ambition of Khawaja and opposition from Mughal nobles, he changed his mind and raised prince Humayun to Mughal throne and remained as the Vakil of the empire.
