= Jos Gommans =

Dutch historian

Jozef Johannes Leon Gommans, shortened to Jos Gommans, is a Dutch historian and professor of Colonial and Global History at the Institute for History, Leiden University.

He was born in Venlo on 1 April 1963. Studying at the Catholic University of Nijmegen and Leiden University, he graduated in 1987. From 1989 to 1993 he was a research fellow for the Dutch Research Council, in 1993 defending his dissertation "Horse-Traders, Mercenaries and Princes: The Formation of the Indo-Afghan Empire in the Eighteenth Century" under the supervision of the Indologists Jan Heesterman and André Wink. He was appointed as associate professor of South Asian history at Leiden University in 1993, gaining professorship in Colonial and Global History in 2011.

Gommans is mainly known for his the books on early modern South Asian history: The Rise of the Indo-Afghan Empire, 1710–1780 (Oxford University Press, 1999) and Mughal Warfare: Indian Frontiers and High Roads to Empire (Routledge, 2002). An omnibus of his South Asian work came out in 2018 as The Indian Frontier: Horse and Warband in the Making of Empires (Routledge, 2018). Later in his career, Gommans started to work on Dutch colonial history, publishing The Unseen World: The Netherlands and India from 1550 (Rijksmuseum and Vantilt 2018) and with Pieter Emmer,The Dutch Overseas Empire, 1600–1800 (Cambridge University Press, 2021). With his former students Lennart Bes and Gijs Kruijtzer he produced the archival inventory Dutch Sources on South Asia c. 1600–1825. Vol. 1: Bibliography and Archival Guide to the National Archives at The Hague (Manohar Publishers. 2001) as well as two historical VOC-atlases: Comprehensive Atlas of the Dutch United East India Company, Part VI: India, Persia and the Arabian Peninsula (Atlas Maior Publishers, 2010) and with Rob van Diessen, Comprehensive Atlas of the Dutch United East India Company, Part VII: East Asia, Burma to Japan (Atlas Maior Publishers, 2010). In the early 2020s he cooperated closely with Said Reza Huseini in writing various research articles on the global intellectual history of Islamic Neoplatonism and the Mongol legacy in particular pertaining to the Mughal emperor Akbar. In all his work, Gommans shows an interest in the medieval and early-modern interactions of South Asia with the outside world, in particular with Central Asia and Europe.

Building on the initiative of his Leiden predecessor Leonard Blussé, Gommans spearheaded several programmes that trained over 150 students from Asia and South Africa at the BA, MA, and PhD levels. Between 2000 and 2025 these programmes (TANAP, Encompass, Cosmopolis and Cosmos Malabaricus) aimed to equip students with the skills to work with Dutch colonial archives, fostering a deeper integration of these sources into the regional histories of Asia and Africa. In 2019 Gommans acted as the Rijksmuseum guest curator of the 2019 exhibition “India and the Netherlands in the Age of Rembrandt” at the Chhatrapati Shivaji Marahaj Vastu Sangrahalaya in Mumbai. He also served as editor-in-chief of the bookseries Dutch Sources on South Asia (Manohar), that continued as the Leiden University Press bookseries Dutch Sources on Colonial and Global History and the Journal of the Economic and Social History of the Orient. He is a fellow of Academia Europaea.
