= Ten Dome Mosque =

Mosque in Bagerhat, Bangladesh

- দশ গম্বুজ মসজিদ
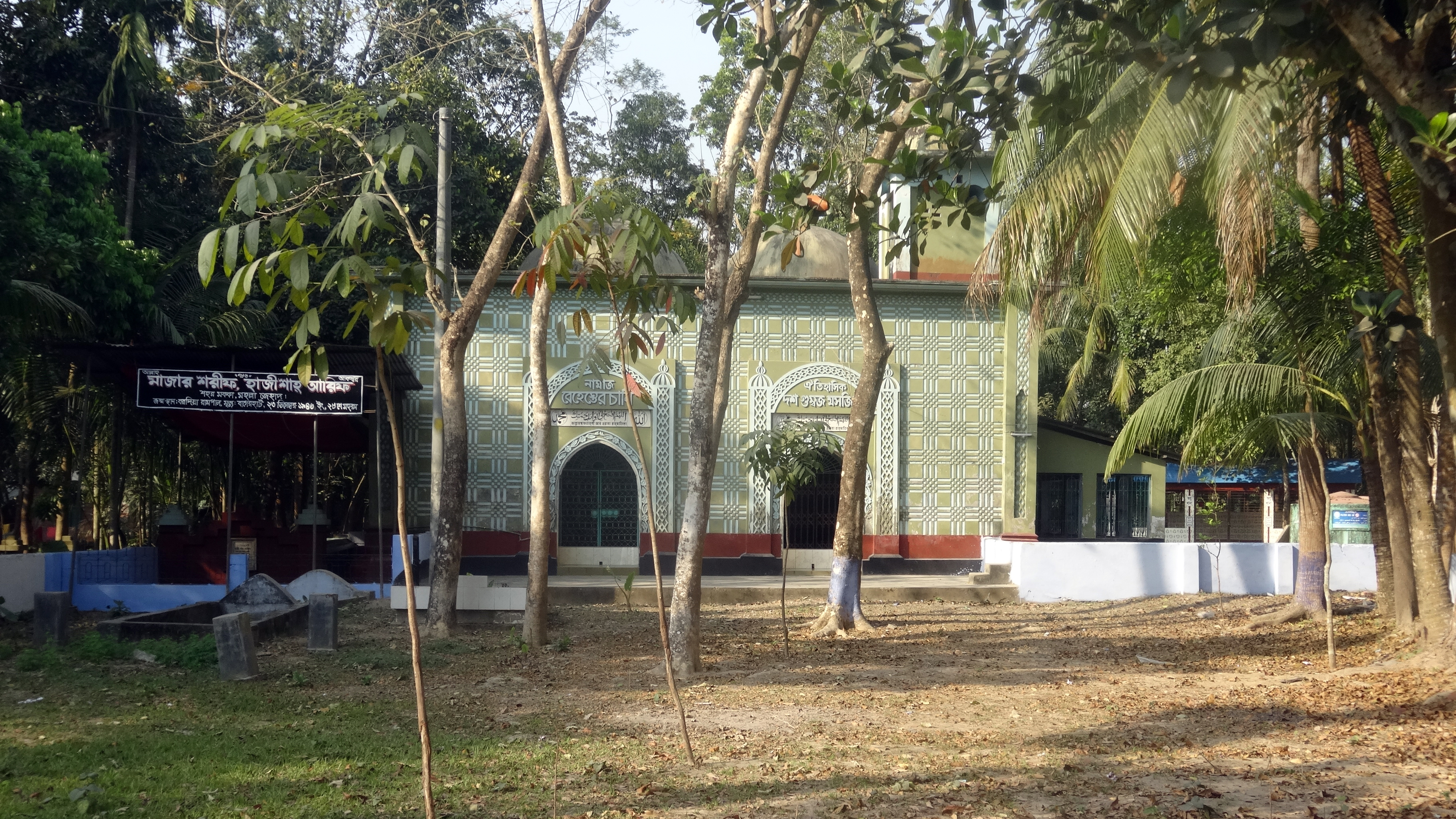

- Location of the mosque in Bangladesh

Religion
- Affiliation: Islam
- Ecclesiastical or organizational status: Mosque
- Status: Active

Location
- Location: Bagerhat, Bagerhat District, Khulna Division
- Country: Bangladesh
- Interactive map of Ten Dome Mosque
- Coordinates: 22°39′54″N 89°46′1″E

Architecture
- Type: Bengal Sultanate
- Established: c. Early 16th century

Specifications
- Direction of façade: West
- Interior area: 142.45 m²
- Dome: 10
- Materials: Brick

Ten Dome Mosque (Bengali: দশ গম্বুজ মসজিদ) is a historic Bengal Sultanate era mosque situated in Bagerhat, Khulna Division, Bangladesh. It is assumed the mosque is likely an early 16th-century structure from the Hussain Shahi era. It has lost most original details due to heavy local renovations, including replastering and the sealing of several entrances.

== History ==
This mosque lacks formal inscriptions and the signature traits of the Khan Jahan style, making it difficult to date with total certainty. However, it is believed to be from the early 16th century, likely built during the reign of Alauddin Husain Shah (r. 1493–1519). Unfortunately, much of its historical integrity has been lost. Due to extensive repairs and plastering by local villagers, many original architectural details have vanished, and several of its northern and eastern entrances have been permanently sealed.

== Architecture ==
This rectangular brick mosque measures 7.40 by 19.25 m (24.3 by 63.2 ft) with massive 1.67 metres (5.5 ft) thick walls. Its interior is divided into five aisles and two bays, covered by ten low domes supported by four short, stout central pillars and several wall pilasters. The layout includes five eastern entrances and a series of five semi-circular mihrabs on the west wall; notably, the northernmost mihrab is smaller and elevated, suggesting the original presence of a raised northwest platform similar to those found in the Choto Sona Mosque or Adina Mosque. Although modern paint and plaster have obscured much of the original decoration, traces of diamond-shaped moldings and hanging motifs remain visible within the architectural recesses.

== Gallery ==
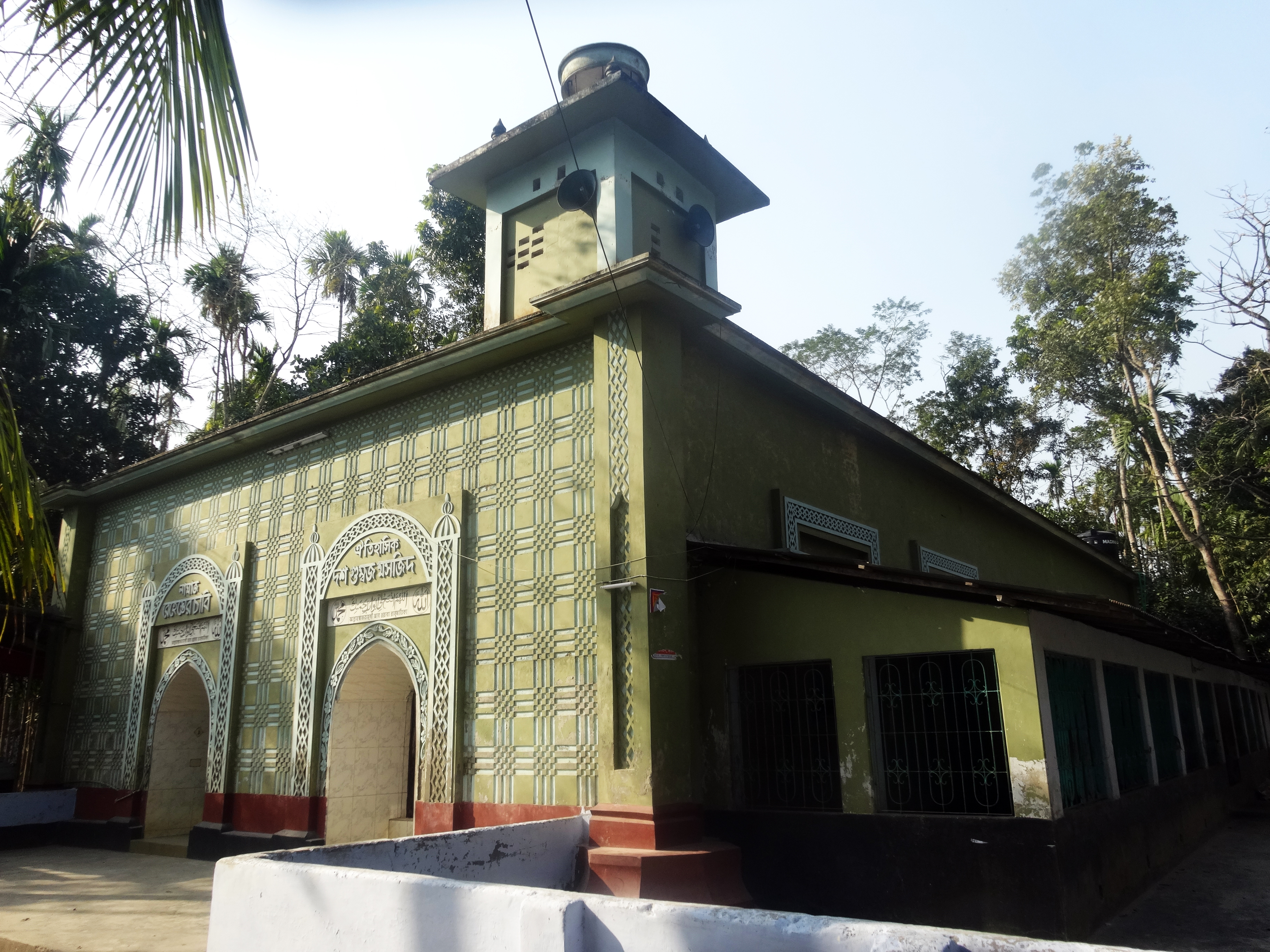
Heavily altered mosque exterior

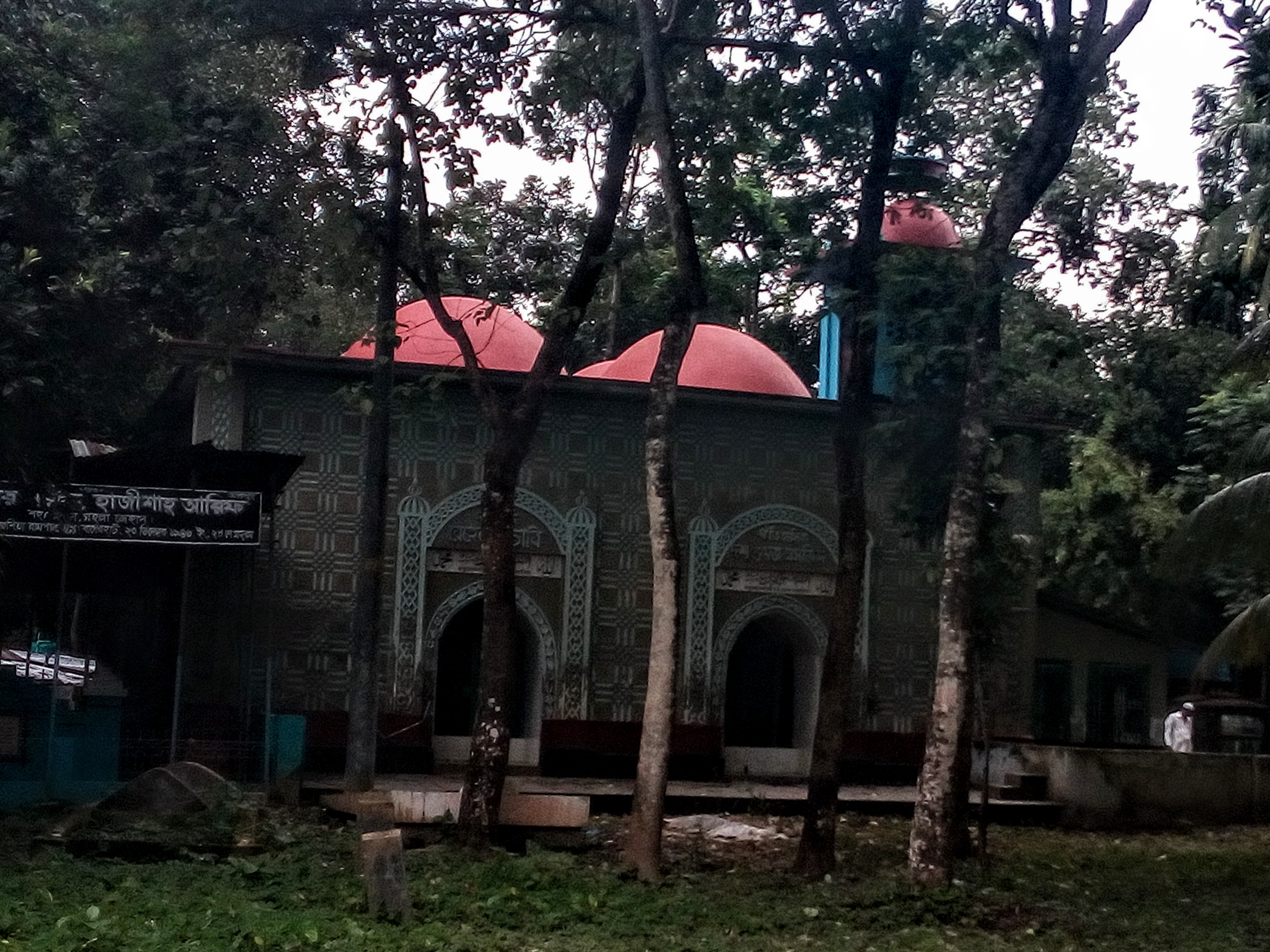
Original domes coloured in red

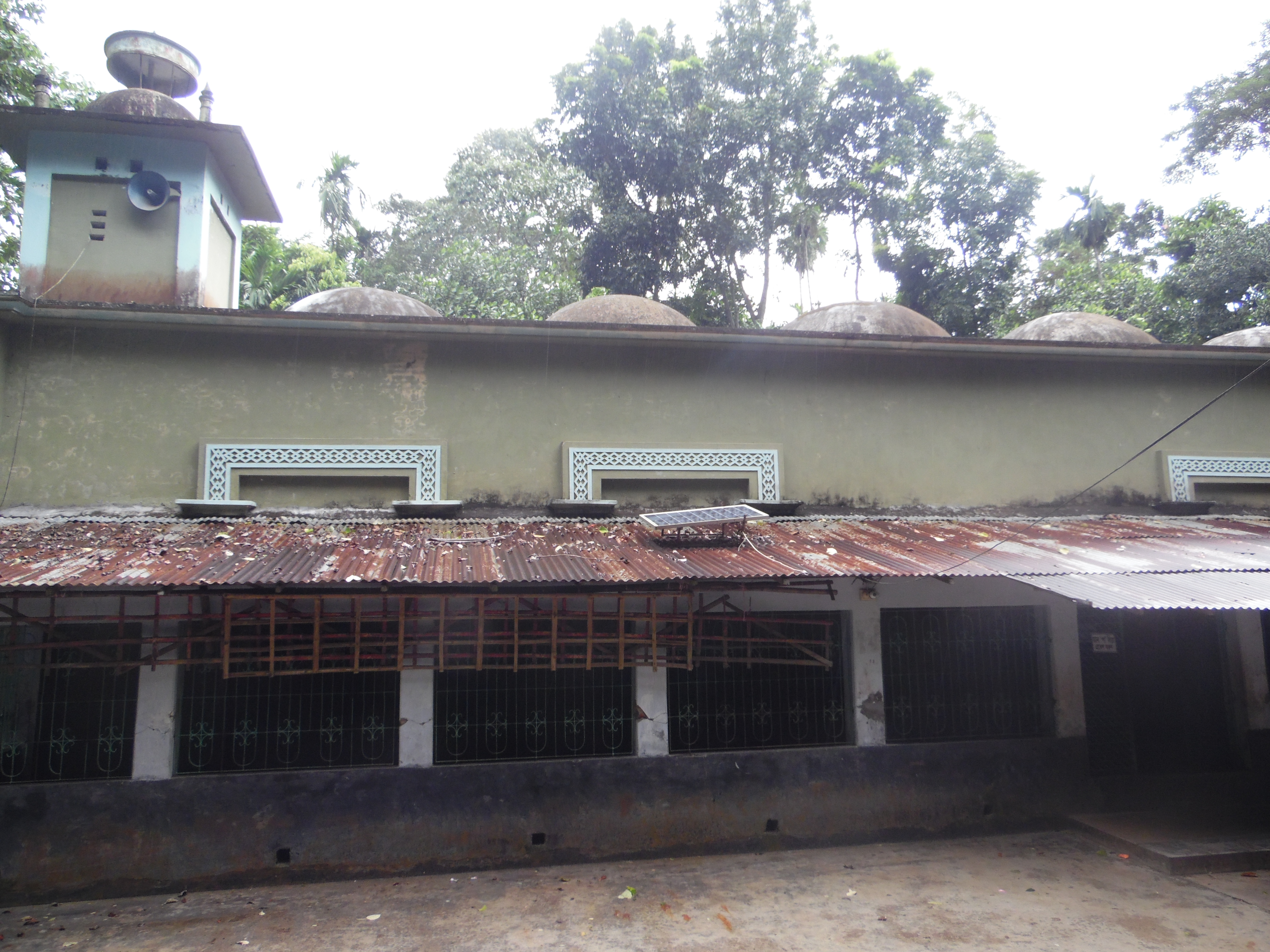
Extra added sections

== See also ==
- Satoir Mosque
- Sayed Jamaluddin Mosque
