= Raja Durbar Deb Roy =

Raja Durbar Deb Ray also known as Durbar Khan was a minor king in Bengal who governed Jhikira, in Howrah district and surrounding regions during the 16th century.

== Origin ==
In 1582 CE. Raja Durbar Roy’s father, Kashyap Deb Roy was established as a minor king in the region along the banks of the Damodar River under Sultan Husyen Shah, during his regein he was killed by the rebellious Dhyang group. Kashyap Deb Roy’s pregnant wife abandoned the kingdom and took refuge in her ancestral village, Kankrol, where Raja Durbar Dev Roy was born.

After growing up and learning about his lineage, Durbar Roy set out to take revenge against the Dhyangs. In a single night, he ruthlessly defeated the entire Dhyang community and reestablished his authority over his ancestral kingdom. Because of this brutality, Sultan Nasrath Shah imprisoned Durbar Khan, but a few days later he released him from captivity, conferred upon him the title of Khan Chowdhury, and granted him administrative authority over the Jhikira region.

== Family tree ==
Raja Kashyap Dev Ray
  - Durbar Khan
    - Kungar Narayan Ray
    - Kanailal Mallick
    - Sridhar Das
    - Chandrabhushan Hazra
              - Prabhuram (8th descendant)
                - Nilambar
                  - Bancharam
                    - Anandaram
                      - Ramjay Kerani
    - Padmavati

== Temples ==
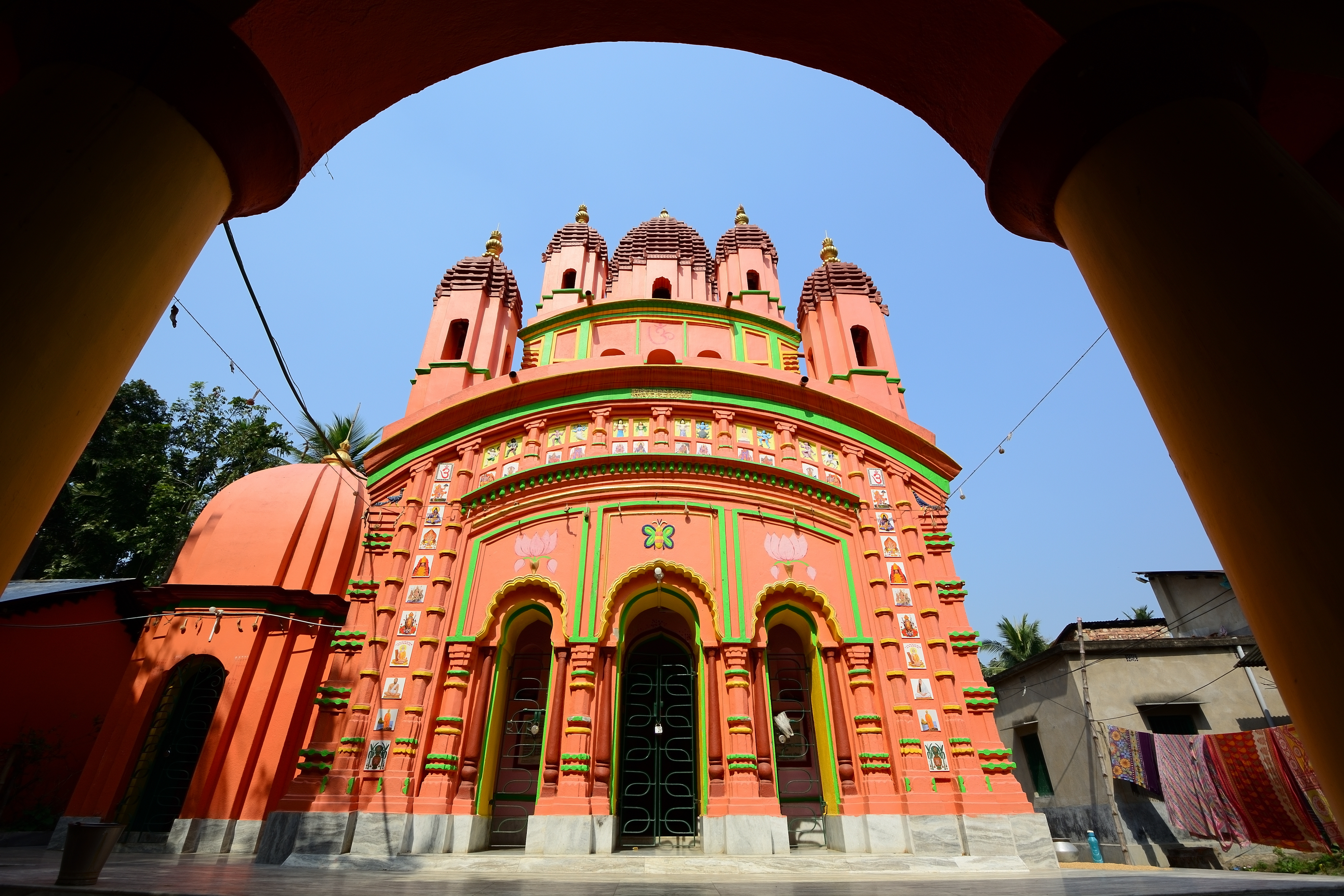
Garh Chandi Temple
