= Darial =

Darial may refer to:

- Darial, Pakistan, a town in the Islamabad Capital Territory of Pakistan, about 45 km from Islamabad
- Darial Gorge, a gorge at the base of Mount Kazbek, near the Russia and Georgia border, about 30 km south of Vladikavkaz
- Dariali Hydropower Plant, a planned, 108-megawatt, run-of-the-river hydroelectric project on the Tergi River, near the Russian-Georgian border
- Darial, Bangladesh, village in Bangladesh
