= Alauddin Firuz Shah II =

Sultan of Bengal in 1533

Alauddin Firuz Shah
- al-Malik al-ʿĀdil ʿAlā ad-Dunyā wa ad-Dīn Abū al-Muẓaffar Fīrūz Shāh (The Just King, Nobility of the World and the Religion, Patriarch of Triumph, King Firuz)

20th Sultan of Bengal
- Reign: 1533
- Predecessor: Nasrat Shah
- Successor: Mahmud Shah III
- Born: Fīrūz bin Naṣrat
- Died: 1533; Sultanate of Bengal
- Burial: 1533; Sultanate of Bengal
- House: Hussain Shahi
- Father: Nasrat Shah
- Religion: Sunni Islam

Governor of Chittagong
- In office Until 1533
- Monarch: Nasrat Shah
- Preceded by: Chhuti Khan

ʿAlā ad-Dīn Fīrūz Shāh (Bengali: আলাউদ্দীন ফিরোজ শাহ, Persian: علاء الدین فیروز شاه) was the son and successor of Sultan Nasiruddin Nasrat Shah of Bengal. He served as a governor of Chittagong during his father's reign, and was a patron of Bengali literature. Firuz Shah ascended the throne in 1533, though it was not unanimously recognised by all the nobles of Bengal. The conflict with the Ahom kingdom continued during his reign and the Bengali army led by Turbak Khan had reached as far as Kaliabor. Within three months as Sultan, Firuz Shah was assassinated by his uncle, who succeeded him as Sultan Ghiyasuddin Mahmud Shah.

== Early life and background ==
Firuz was born in the Sultanate of Bengal to an aristocratic Bengali Sunni Muslim family known as the Hussain Shahi dynasty. His father, Nasiruddin Nasrat Shah, was a son of Sultan Alauddin Husain Shah of Bengal and a son-in-law of Sultan Ibrahim Lodi of Delhi. From an early age, Firuz was an admirer of Bengali literature. As a royal prince and governor of Chittagong, Firuz requested a writer known as Dvija Sridhara to compose the Vidya-Sundar love story in Bengali poetry form, which was completed later during his reign. Sridhara continuously praised Firuz in the poem for his good manners and wisdom.

== Reign ==
Sultan Nusrat Shah was assassinated by a eunuch when returning from a visit to the tomb of his father, Alauddin Husain Shah. Following his death, the throne was contested between his son, Firuz, and his brother, Mahmud, with the former initially succeeding him. Mahmud had served as an ameer during his brother's reign and the 20th-century historian Jadunath Sarkar suggests that Mahmud was the heir apparent due to his early usage of royal insignia. Nevertheless, the nobles of the Sultanate including Mahmud's brother-in-law Makhdum Alam, the Governor of North Bihar, installed Firuz Shah to the throne.

On the first day of Ramadan 939 AH (27 March 1533), a congregational mosque was built in Kalna, Burdwan by Ulugh Masnad Khan, who was Firuz Shah's governor, commander and minister. Within the space of three months, Firuz Shah was assassinated by his uncle, Mahmud, who succeeded him as the Sultan of Bengal.

== Legacy ==
The Riyaz-us-Salatin, written by Ghulam Husain Salim in 1787, was the first history of Bengal which mentioned Firuz Shah, with his name being absent from the earlier chronicles, such as those written by Firishta and Nizamuddin Ahmad. Though Salim's source is unknown, a century later, Heinrich Blochmann publicised the inscription adjacent to the Kalna Shahi Mosque which commemorated the mosque's construction by Ulugh Masnad Khan. During this time, the mosque was still in use and its guardians were known to have held large bighas of land. Coins from Firuz Shah's reign are now kept in the British Museum.

== See also ==
- List of rulers of Bengal
- History of Bengal
- History of Bangladesh
- History of India

== Bibliography ==
- Sarkar, Jadunath, ed. (1973) [First published 1948]. "VII: The Husain Shāhī Dynasty". The History of Bengal. Vol. II: Muslim Period, 1200–1757. Patna: Academica Asiatica. OCLC 924890.

Preceded by Nasiruddin Nasrat Shah	Sultanate of Bengal; Hussain Shahi dynasty 1533	Succeeded by Ghiyasuddin Mahmud Shah
