= Nalua =

Nalua নলুয়া
- Village
- Location in Bangladesh
- Coordinates: 22°31′N 90°24′E
- Country: Bangladesh
- Division: Barisal Division
- District: Barisal District
- Upazila: Bakerganj Upazila

Area
  - Total: 10.02 km^{2} (3.87 sq mi)

Population (2022)
  - Total: 9,166
  - Density: 914.8/km^{2} (2,369/sq mi)
- Time zone: UTC+6 (Bangladesh Time)

Nalua is a village in Bakerganj Upazila of Barisal District in the Barisal Division of southern-central Bangladesh.

According to the 2022 Census of Bangladesh, Nalua had 2,175 households and a population of 9,166. It has a total area of 10.02 km^{2} (3.87 sq mi).
