= Kalaskathi =

Kalaskati কলসকাঠি Kalaskathi
- Village
- Location in Bangladesh
- Coordinates: 22°31′N 90°21′E
- Country: Bangladesh
- Division: Barisal Division
- District: Barisal District
- Upazila: Bakerganj Upazila

Area
  - Total: 2.03 km^{2} (0.78 sq mi)

Population (2022)
  - Total: 3,374
  - Density: 1,660/km^{2} (4,300/sq mi)
- Time zone: UTC+6 (Bangladesh Time)

Kalaskati or Kalaskathi is a village in Bakerganj Upazila of Barisal District in the Barisal Division of southern-central Bangladesh.

According to the 2022 Census of Bangladesh, Kalaskati had 816 households and a population of 3,374. It has a total area of 2.03 km^{2} (0.78 sq mi).
