= Bharpasha =

Bharpasa ০৮ নং ভরপাশা ইউনিয়ন Bharpasha Union
- Village
- Location in Bangladesh
- Coordinates: 22°32′N 90°19′E
- Country: Bangladesh
- Division: Barisal Division
- District: Barisal District
- Upazila: Bakerganj Upazila

Government
  - Type: Local Government System
  - UP Chairman: Ashrafuzzaman Khan Khokon

Area
  - Total: 68.6 km^{2} (26.50 sq mi)

Population (2022)
  - Total: 18,743
  - Density: 273.1/km^{2} (707.3/sq mi)
- Time zone: UTC+6 (Bangladesh Time)

Bharpasa or Bharpasha is a village in Bakerganj Upazila of Barisal District in the Barisal Division of southern-central Bangladesh.

== History ==
Agha Baqer Khan was the most powerful landlord of Bakla-Chandradwip. He established a port and administrative center covering Bharpasha, Rangashree, and Garuria, and in 1741 AD, he named the port after himself as Bakerganj. In 1797 AD, the British created Bakerganj District following the name of Agha Baqer Khan. From 1797 to 1993, the district was known as Bakerganj. On 1 March 1993, after the creation of Barishal Division, the name Bakerganj remained limited to the upazila level. Bharpasha Union is a traditional area of Bakerganj Upazila in the historic Bakerganj District, carrying the marks of time. Over time, today Bharpasha Union has kept its own uniqueness alive in education, culture, religious events, sports, and various other fields.

== Population ==
According to the 2022 Census of Bangladesh, Bharpasha had 690 households and a population of 18,743.
