= Padri Shibpur =

Padri Shibpur পাদ্রী শিবপুর
- Village
- Location in Bangladesh
- Coordinates: 22°30′N 90°17′E
- Country: Bangladesh
- Division: Barisal Division
- District: Barisal District
- Upazila: Bakerganj Upazila

Area
  - Total: 5.18 km^{2} (2.00 sq mi)

Population (2022)
  - Total: 4,946
  - Density: 955/km^{2} (2,470/sq mi)
- Time zone: UTC+6 (Bangladesh Time)

Padri Shibpur is a village in Bakerganj Upazila of Barisal District in the Barisal Division of southern-central Bangladesh.

According to the 2022 Census of Bangladesh, Padri Shibpur had 1,267 households and a population of 4,946. It has a total area of 5.18 km^{2} (2.00 sq mi).

== Notable people ==
- Patrick D'Rozario
