= Satoir Mosque =

Mosque in Faridpur, Bangladesh

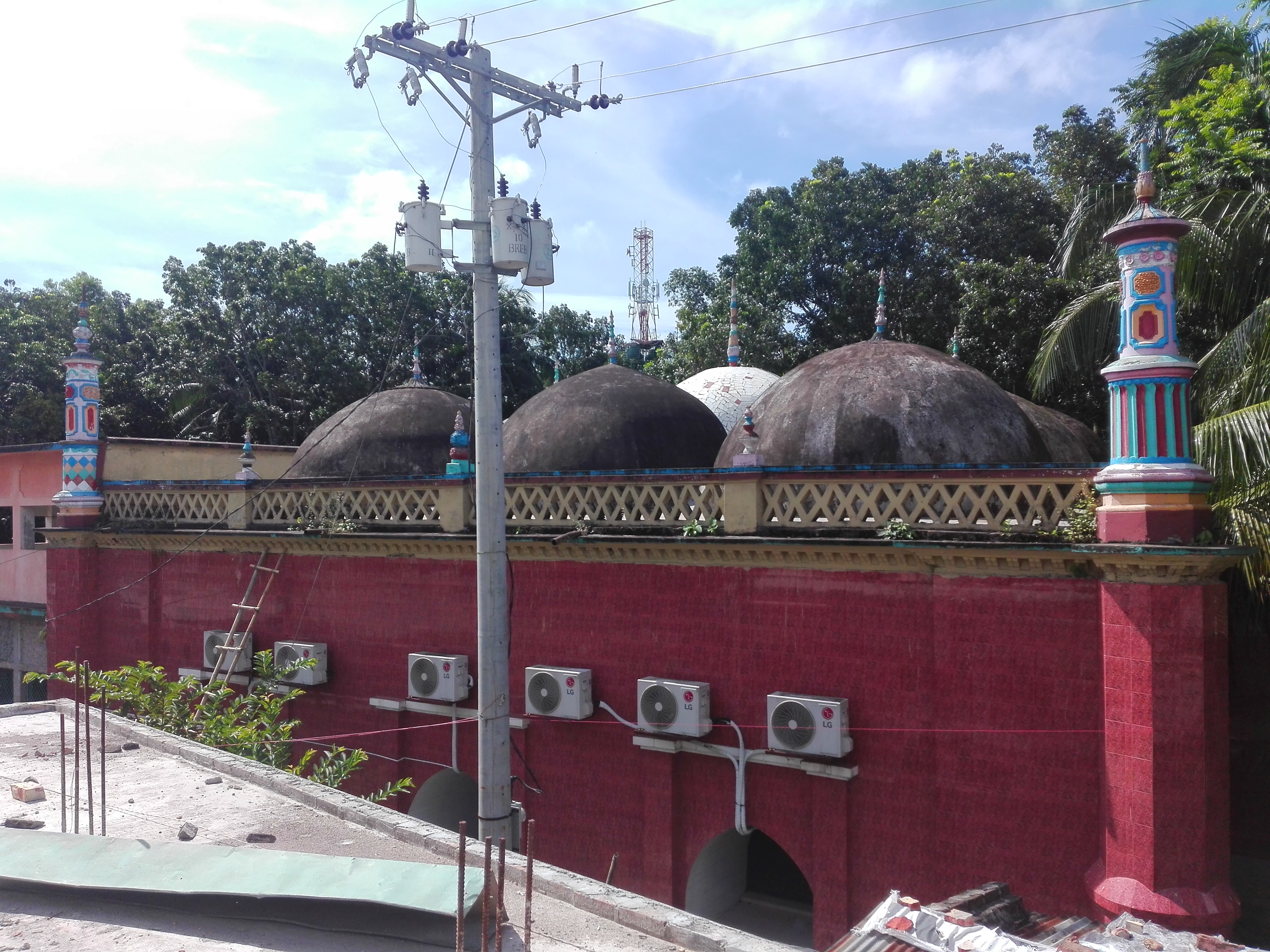

Religion
- Affiliation: Muslim (Sunni)

Location
- Location: Satoir, Boalmari, Faridpur, Bangladesh
- Interactive map of Satoir Mosque

Architecture
- Architect: Alauddin Hussain Shah
- Style: Tughlaq

Specifications
- Dome: 9
- Minaret: 4

Satoir Mosque is one of the oldest mosques in Bangladesh. It was built during the reign of Ala Uddin Hussain Shah or Sher Shah. It is located in Boalmari Upazila of Faridpur. It is a historic and culturally significant mosque renowned for its architectural beauty and historical value.

== History ==
Alauddin Hussain Shah (1494–1519) was a Sultan of independent Bengal. At that time there were many saint living in this Satoir village. Among them, Alauddin Hussain Shah was the murid of Hazrat Shah Sufi Shaikh Shah Chaturi. This historical mosque was built during that time. The historic Grand Trunk Road or Sher Shah Road is adjacent to the Satoir shahi Mosque. Some consider the Satair Shahi Mosque to be a feat of Sher Shah's (1486 – 22 May 1545) reign. It is assumed that Alauddin Hussain Shah built this mosque in honor of one of his pirs. Later, the mosque was completely abandoned and covered with forest. The mosque has been extensively renovated and rebuilt since its discovery in the early 20th century.

== Description ==
This square mosque measures 17.8 meters on each side from the outside and 13.8 meters from the inside. The floor of the mosque was about 0.76 meters high from the ground in the east, but now it is 0.6 meters high. There are a total of nine tuber shaped domes. 4 pillars made of stone inside the mosque and there are a total of 12 pillars on the wall and adjacent to the wall. The pendentive method is used in the construction of the dome. There are three mihrabs in the west, the center of which is relatively large.

== See also ==
- List of mosques in Bangladesh
- List of mosques in Dhaka Division
