= Dudhalmou =

Dudhalmou দুধলমৌ
- Village
- Location in Bangladesh
- Coordinates: 22°47′N 90°17′E
- Country: Bangladesh
- Division: Barisal Division
- District: Barisal District
- Upazila: Bakerganj Upazila

Area
  - Total: 7.93 km^{2} (3.06 sq mi)

Population (2022)
  - Total: 14,471
  - Density: 1,820/km^{2} (4,730/sq mi)
- Time zone: UTC+6 (Bangladesh Time)

Dudhalmou is a village in Bakerganj Upazila of Barisal District in the Barisal Division of southern-central Bangladesh.

According to the 2022 Census of Bangladesh, Dudhalmou had 2,530 households and a population of 14,471. It has a total area of 7.93 km^{2} (3.06 sq mi).
