= Darial, Bangladesh =

Darial দাড়িয়াল
- Village
- Location in Bangladesh
- Coordinates: 22°38′N 90°28′E
- Country: Bangladesh
- Division: Barisal Division
- District: Barisal District
- Upazila: Bakerganj Upazila

Population (2022)
  - Total: 6,400
- Time zone: UTC+6 (Bangladesh Time)

Darial is a village in Bakerganj Upazila of Barisal District in the Barisal Division of southern-central Bangladesh.

According to the 2022 Census of Bangladesh, Darial had 1,633 households and a population of 6400.
