= Nasrat Gazi Mosque =

Mosque and archaeological site in Barisal, Bangladesh

Nasrat Ghazi Mosque
- নসরত গাজীর মসজিদ
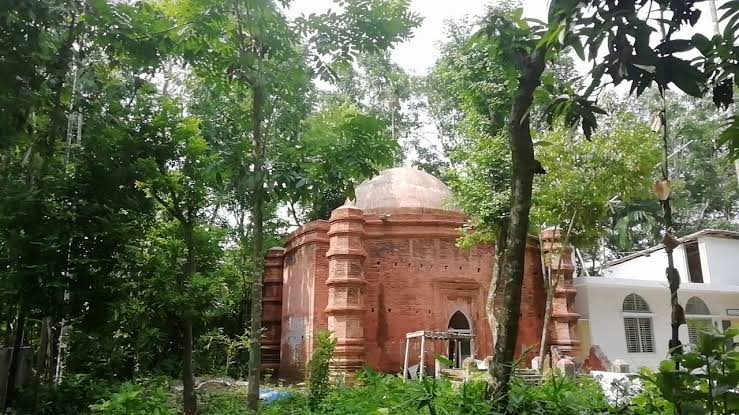
- The mosque in 2019

- Location of the mosque in Bangladesh

Religion
- Affiliation: Islam
- Ecclesiastical or organisational status: Mosque
- Status: Active

Location
- Location: Bakerganj, Barisal District
- Country: Bangladesh
- Administration: Department of Archaeology
- Coordinates: 22°33′09″N 90°26′24″E

Architecture
- Founder: Nasrat Ghazi
- Completed: 1532; 494 years ago

Specifications
- Length: 4.5 m (15 ft)
- Width: 4.5 m (15 ft)
- Dome: One

The Nasrat Ghazi Mosque (Bengali: নসরত গাজীর মসজিদ, Arabic: مسجد نصرت غازي) is a 16th-century one-domed mosque and archaeological site located in the village of Middle Sialguni in Bakerganj Upazila, part of the Barisal District of southern Bangladesh. The mosque was built during the reign of Sultan Nasiruddin Nasrat Shah.

== Architecture ==
This one-domed mosque is built on a square ground-plan which acts as an eidgah. The mosque is made of lime mortar and thin square bricks. The length and width of the interior of the mosque are a little over 4.5 metres (15 ft), while the walls are 1.43 metres (4 ft 8 in) thick. The exterior of the mosque has four octagonal pillars in the four corners. There are arched entrances on the east, south and north sides. However, the north and south entrances are currently being used as two windows. The inner western wall of the mosque has a mihrab. In addition, there are four small mihrabs and lamps on the north and south walls. The walls, cornices and pillars of the mosque are decorated with flowers and foliage.

== History ==
The mosque was constructed in 1532 CE, the final year of Sultan Nasiruddin Nasrat Shah's reign. It is said Nasrat Ghazi established this mosque, and hence its name. To the north, west and south sides of the mosque, there are ancient graves, although none of them belong to Nasrat Ghazi.

The mosque is under the protection of the Bangladeshi Department of Archaeology, though it continues to be actively used by worshippers, even for iftar gatherings and tarawih sessions. The mosque was renovated in 2000, and again in 2015. A modern building has been constructed next to the mosque to increase the capacity of worshippers for daily prayers although the Nasrat Gazi mosque acts as the main prayer hall for the imam.

== Gallery ==
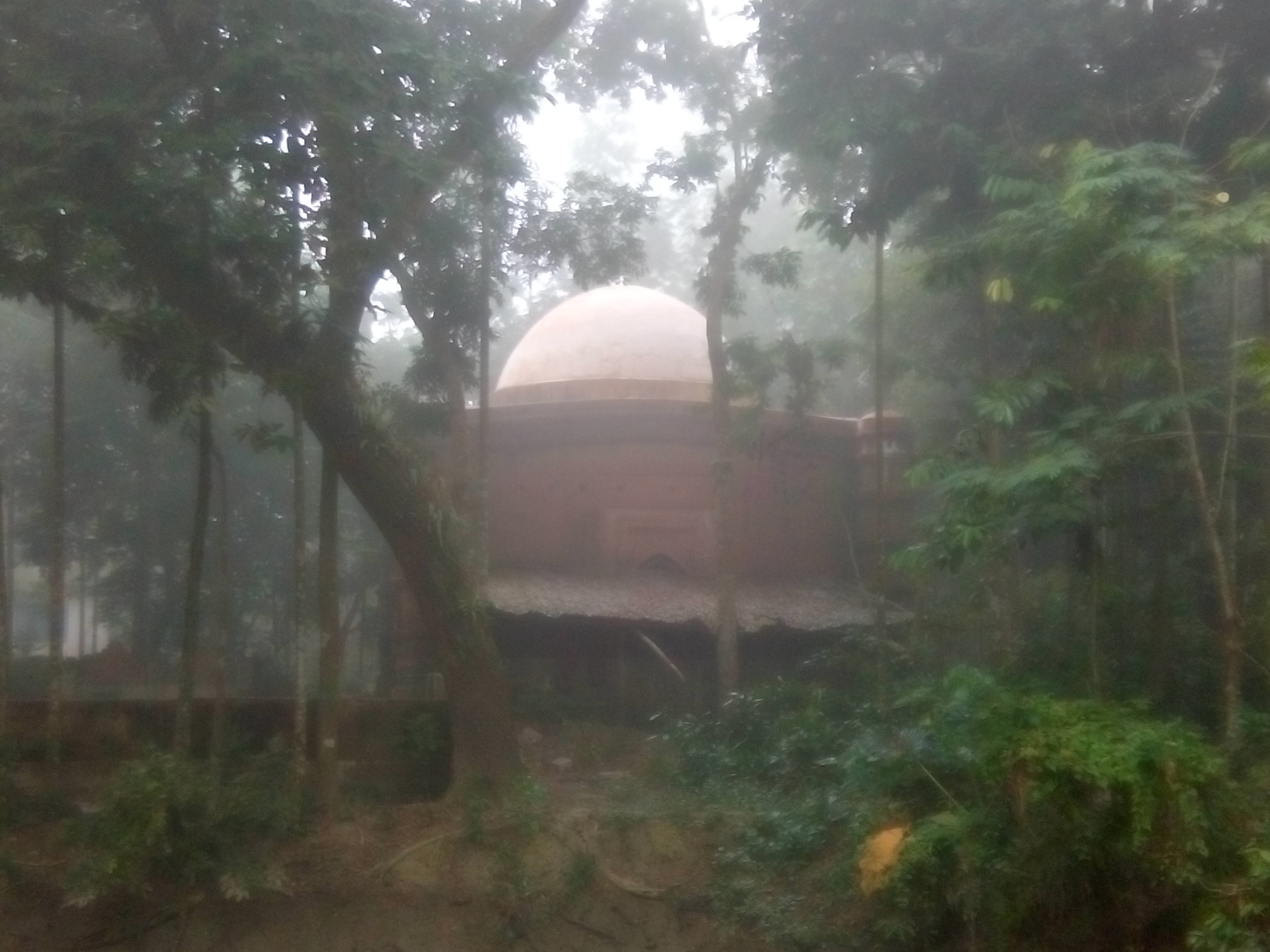
Rear view

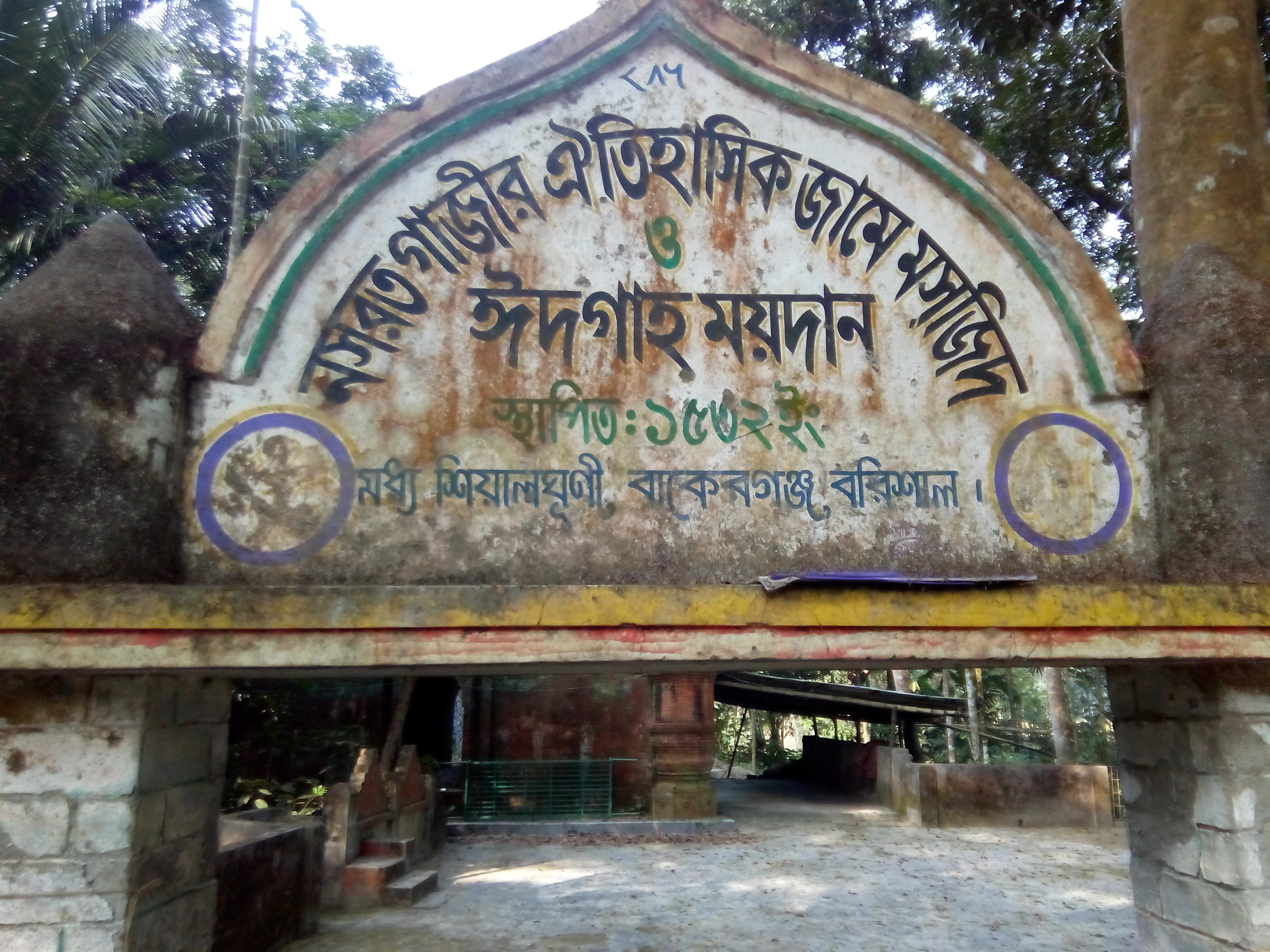
The gate of the mosque reads

== See also ==
- Islam in Bangladesh
- List of mosques in Bangladesh
- List of archaeological sites in Bangladesh
