= Sayed Jamaluddin Mosque =

Former mosque in Hooghly, West Bengal, India

- Bengali: সৈয়দ জামালুদ্দিনের মসজিদ; Arabic: مسجد سيد جمال الدين
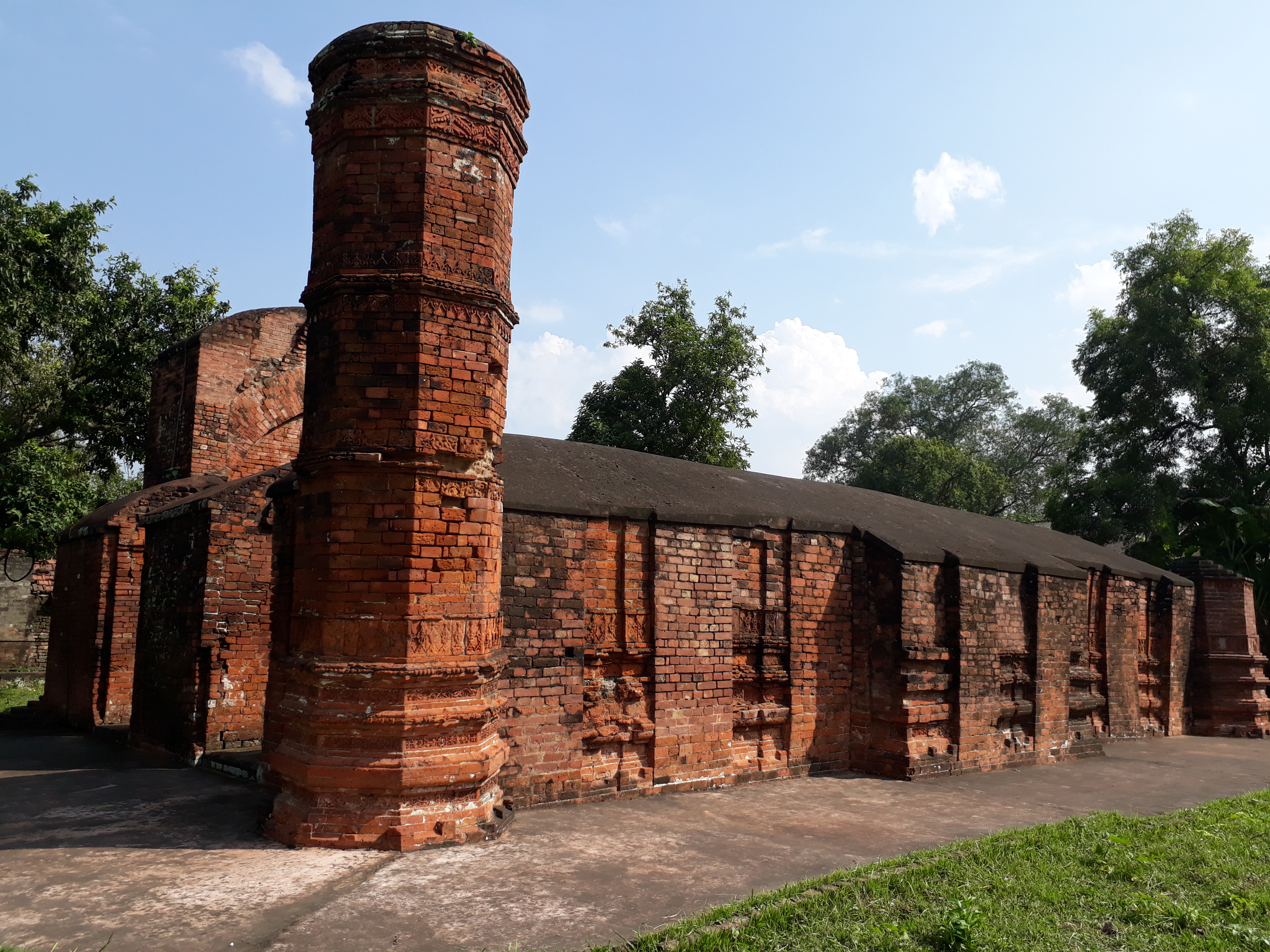
- The former mosque in 2008

- Location of the former mosque in West Bengal

Religion
- Affiliation: Islam (former)
- Ecclesiastical or organisational status: Mosque (former)
- Status: Inactive; (partial ruinous state)

Location
- Location: Hooghly district, West Bengal
- Country: India
- Coordinates: 22°57′37″N 88°22′11″E

Architecture
- Style: Indo-Islamic
- Completed: 936 AH (1529/1530 CE)

Specifications
- Minaret: One (partial ruins)
- Materials: Brick; terracotta

Monument of National Importance
- Official name: Mosque & Tombs
- Reference no.: N-WB-70

The Sayed Jamaluddin Mosque (Bengali: সৈয়দ জামালুদ্দিনের মসজিদ; Arabic: مسجد سيد جمال الدين) is a former mosque and archaeological site, now in partial ruins, located in the ancient city of Saptagram in Hooghly district, West Bengal. The mosque was built during the reign of the Bengali sultan Nasiruddin Nasrat Shah. The structure is a Monument of National Importance.

== History ==
A stone foundation plaque attached to the mosque states that it was constructed by Sayed Jamaluddin, son of Sayed Fakhruddin of Amol during the reign of Nasiruddin Nasrat Shah. The date mentioned in the inscription is Ramadan 936 AH (1529/1530 CE), in the month of May. Within the mosque complex are three tombs, which belong to Sayed Fakhruddin, his wife, and his eunuch.

== Architecture ==
It is a unique brick built mosque decorated with terracotta ornamentation. It represents the terracotta elements of the Indian architecture of Bengal. There are three tombs in the mosque complex. The ruined mosque is under the maintenance of Archaeological Survey of India (ASI).

== Gallery ==
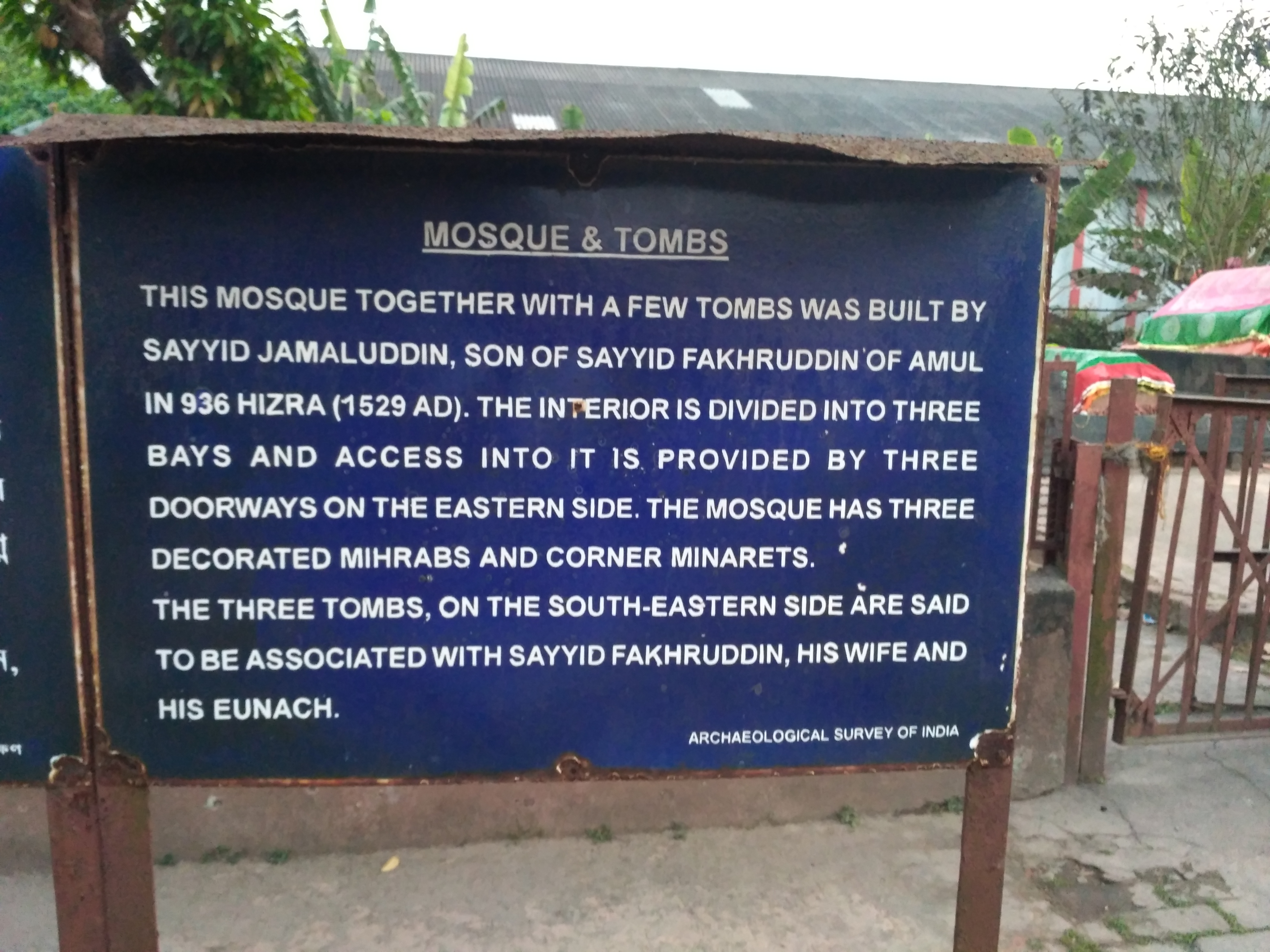
Signboard

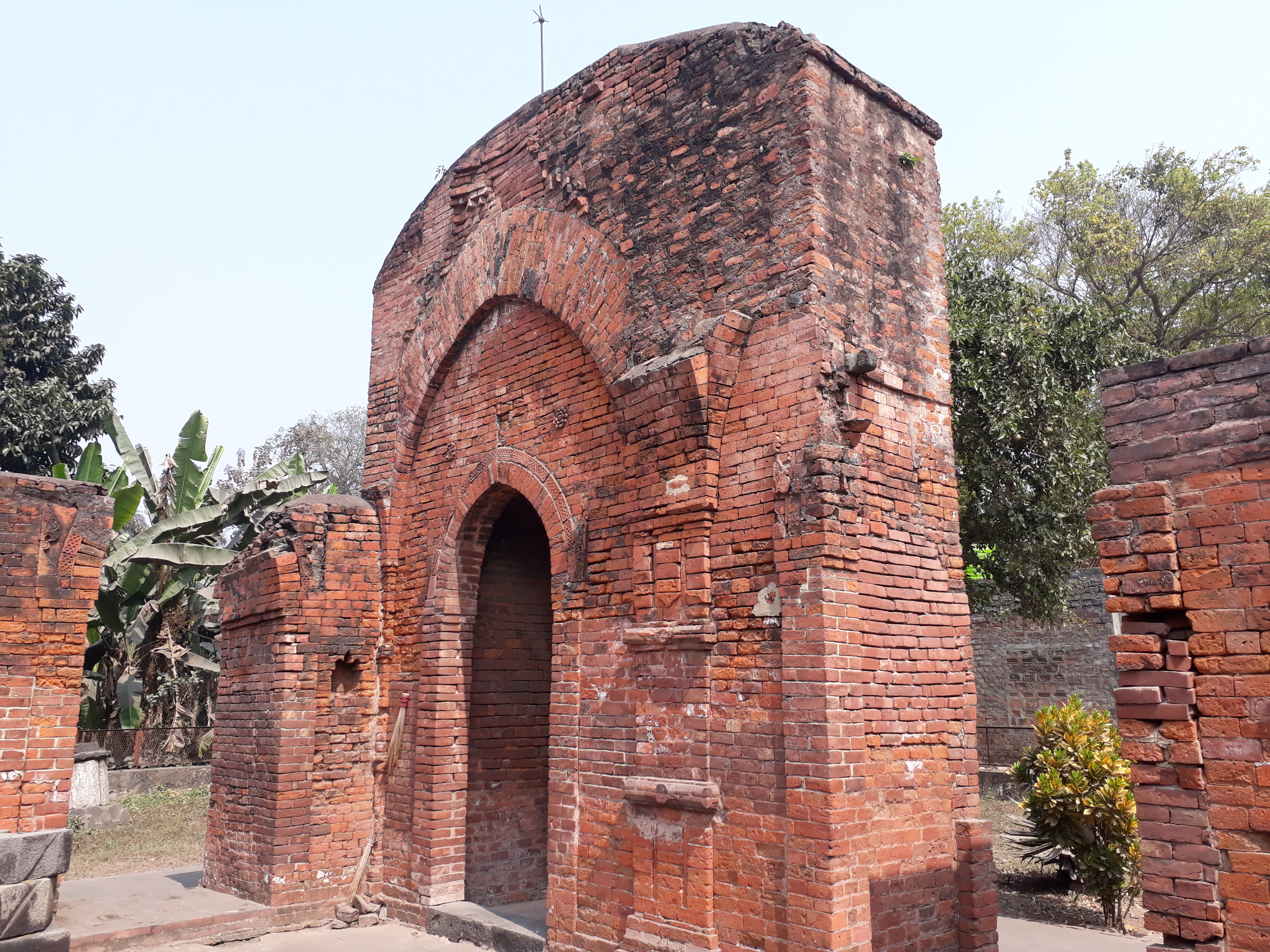
Entrance

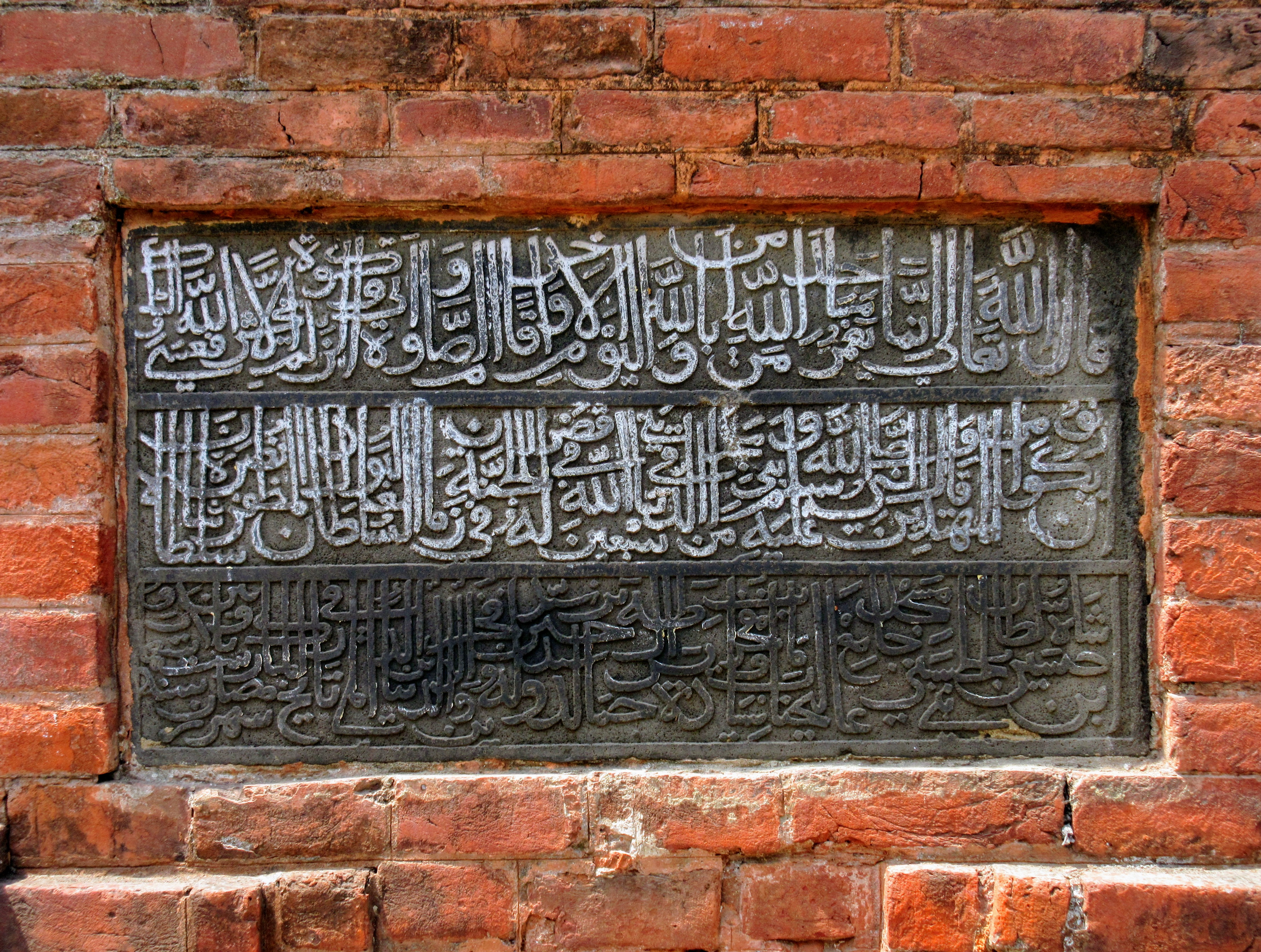
Inscription

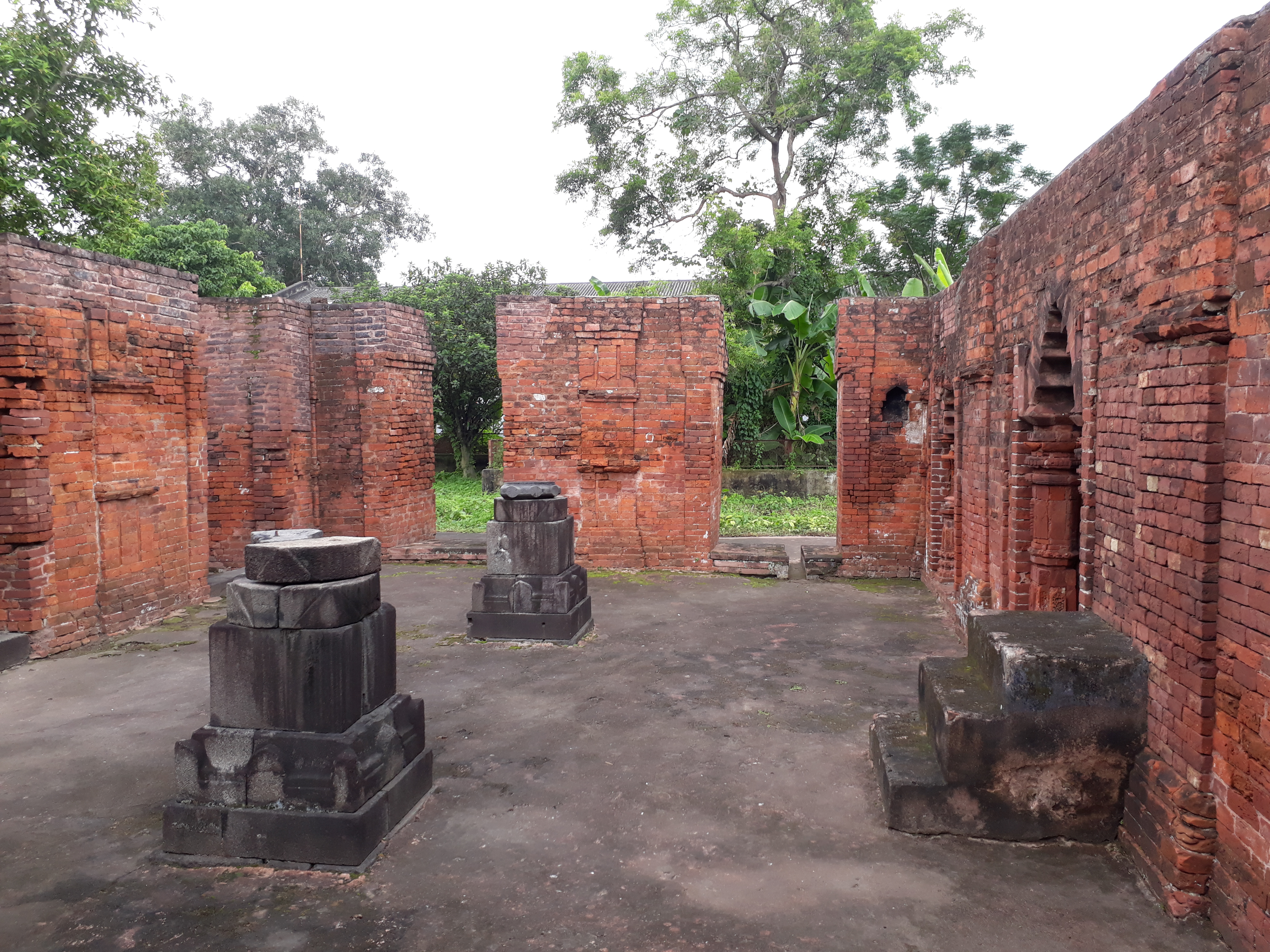
Pillars

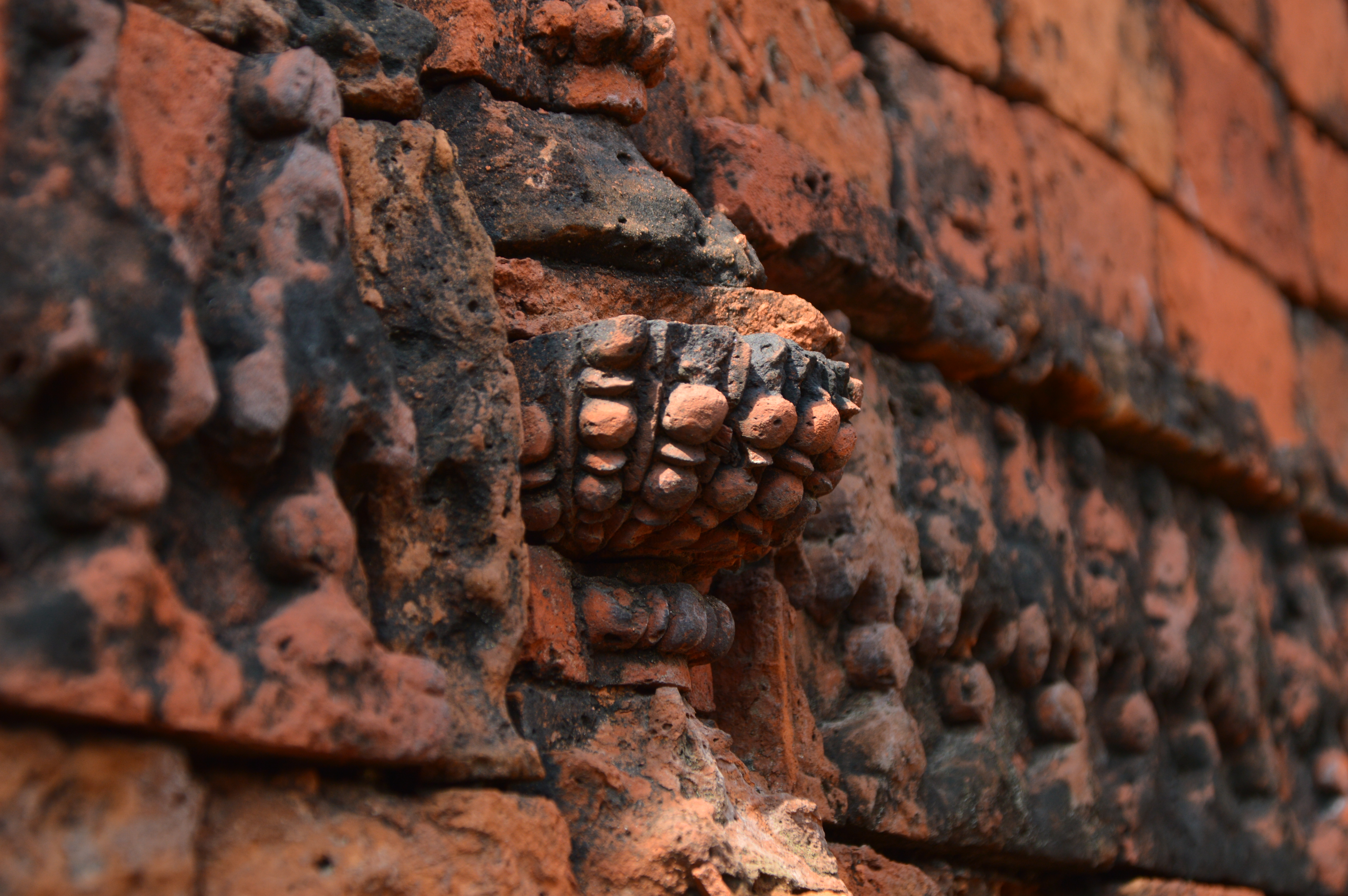
Terracotta work

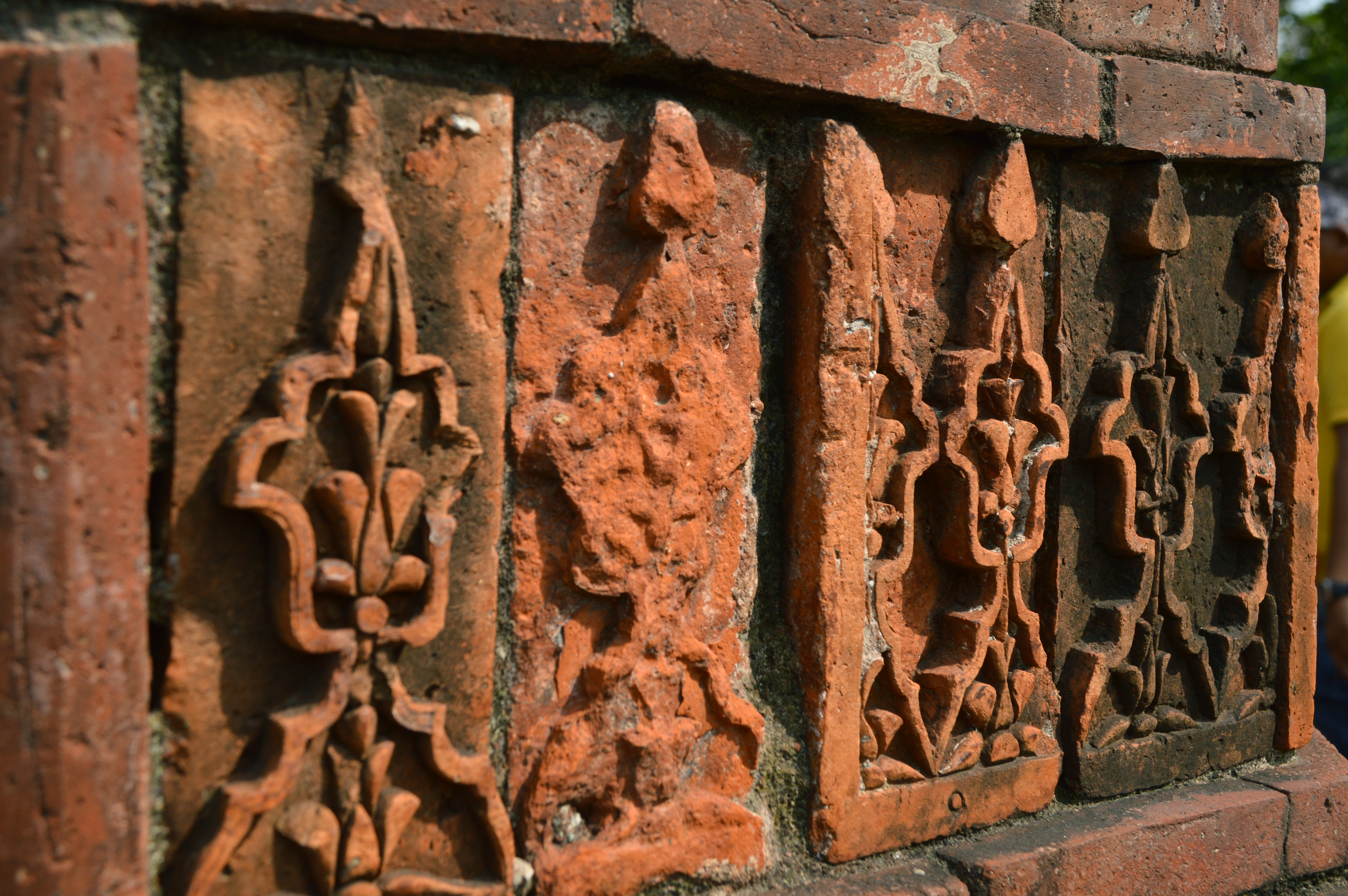
Terracotta work

== See also ==
- Islam in India
- List of mosques in India
- List of Monuments of National Importance in West Bengal
