= Darial, Pakistan =

Darial
- Town
- Location within Pakistan
- Coordinates: 33.23°N 73.19°E
- Country: Pakistan
- Province: (Islamabad Capital Territory) Islamabad C.T
- Elevation: 494 m (1,621 ft)
- Time zone: UTC+5 (PST)

Darial is a town in the Islamabad Capital Territory of Pakistan. It is located at 33° 23' 35N 73° 19' 45E with an altitude of 494 metres (1624 feet).
