= Ghiyasuddin Mahmud Shah =

Sultan of Bengal from 1533 to 1538

- Ghiyāth ad-Dunyā wa ad-Dīn Abū al-Muẓaffar

21st Sultan of Bengal
- Reign: 1533–6 April 1538
- Predecessor: Alauddin Firuz Shah II
- Successor: Bengal conquered by Sher Shah Suri (Muhammad Khan Sur as Sultan)
- Died: April 1538
- Spouses: "Ten thousand concubines" (Portuguese sources)
- Issue: Muyid Beg; Syeda Momena Khatun; Two sons (killed by Sher Shah Suri); Wife of Khidr Khan Surak
- Father: Alauddin Husain Shah
- Religion: Islam

Ghiyasuddin Mahmud Shah (Bengali: গিয়াসউদ্দীন মাহমুদ শাহ, Persian: غیاث الدین محمود شاه) was the last sultan of the Hussain Shahi dynasty of the Bengal Sultanate, reigning from 1533 to 1538 CE. The dynasty was founded by his father, Alauddin Husain Shah, in 1494.

== History ==
Born as Abul Badr, one of the eighteen or twenty four sons of Alauddin Hussain Shah, the prince was heir apparent during the first half of the reign of his older brother Nasrat Shah but was superseded by his nephew Alauddin Firuz Shah II sometime before 1532. However, upon his nephew's ascension he assassinated his nephew and usurped the throne.

Banglapedia assesses him as a "weak, pleasure loving and easy-going ruler" who "had neither diplomatic foresight, nor any practical approach to the political problems which beset Bengal during his reign." The Portuguese sources state that Mahmud was a debauche who had "ten thousand women in his harem". His reign was marked by rebellions, including those by Khuda Bakhsh Khan, his general and governor of Chittagong, and his brother-in-law, Makhdum Alam, the governor of Hajipur.

Makhdum Alam refused to recognize Mahmud as the Sultan of Bengal, accusing him of assassinating the previous sultan and their nephew Firuz. He formed an alliance with Sher Shah, who saw this as an opportunity to crush the power of the Lohani nobles allied with Mahmud Shah. Mahmud Shah sent several expeditions against Sher Shah, which were all defeated. Makhdum Alam however, was killed, and his estates fell to Sher Shah upon his death. In 1534, Mahmud Shah sent an army of artillery, cavalry and infantry under Ibrahim Khan to conquer Bihar, with Jalal Khan accompanying the campaign. However, Sher Shah launched a sudden attack on the combined forces of the Lohani chiefs of Bihar and Mahmud Shah of Bengal, defeating them at Battle of Surajgarh in March 1534, winning a decisive victory. Ibrahim Khan was killed during the battle, and Jalal Khan was forced to retreat to Bengal. Following the victory, Sher Shah consolidated his control over Bihar.

During his reign the Portuguese arrived in Chittagong in 1534, and were captured and sent to Gaur as prisoners on charges of mischief. But, in the face of enemy superiority he reconciled with them and permitted them to establish factories and commercial stations at Chittagong and Hughli. Later, with the help of the Portuguese, the sultan held the Teliagarhi pass (1536 AD) avoiding the invasion by Sher Shah Suri. Between 1536 and 1537, Sher Shah followed up his victories by invading Bengal and defeating Mahmud Shah numerous times, occupying all lands west of the Teliagarhi pass. Mahmud Shah again repeatedly requested the Portuguese to aid him, which they did by fortifying the Teliaghari and Sakrigali passes. Sher Shah, however, out-flanked the combined armies and reached Gauda by way of Jharkhand. Mahmud Shah immediately capitulated, and was forced to pay over 13,000,000 gold coins, and cede territory up to Sakrigali. Ghiyasuddin Mahmud Shah and his Portuguese allies were finally decisively defeated by Sher Shah Suri on 6 April 1538 and his capital of Gaur was sacked and "sixty million in gold" was taken away by Sher Shah, as Mahmud's appeals to the Mughal Emperor Humayun went unanswered amid the emperor's preoccupation in Gujrat.

Mahmud Shah died of wounds sustained during the siege of Gaur by Sher Shah Suri, and grief after learning two of his sons had been executed by the Afghans. A son of Mahmud, Muyid Beg, was appointed as a general in Emperor Humayun's army and fought for the emperor in Humayun's conquest of Gaur.

== See also ==
- List of rulers of Bengal
- History of Bengal
- History of Bangladesh
- History of India

== Sources ==
- Ahmed, ABM Shamsuddin (2012). "Ghiyasuddin Mahmud Shah". In Islam, Sirajul; Jamal, Ahmed A. (eds.). Banglapedia: National Encyclopedia of Bangladesh (Second ed.). Asiatic Society of Bangladesh.
- Chandra, Satish (2005) [First published 1999]. Medieval India: From Sultanat to the Mughals - Part Two: Mughal Empire (1526–1748) (3rd ed.). Har-Anand Publications. ISBN 978-81-241-1066-9.
- Kolff, Dirk (2002). Naukar, Rajput, and Sepoy: The Ethnohistory of the Military Labour Market of Hindustan, 1450-1850. Cambridge University Press. ISBN 978-0-521-52305-9.
- Mahajan, Vidya Dhar (1968). India Since 1526 (8th ed.). S. Chand.
- Mehta, J. L. (1984) [1981]. Advanced Study in the History of Medieval India. Sterling Publishers Pvt. Ltd. ISBN 978-81-207-1015-3.
- Srivastava, Ashirbadi Lal (1964). The Mughal Empire, 1526-1803 A.D. S. L. Agarwala.
- Elliot, H. M.; Dowson, John, eds. (1872). The History of India, as Told by Its Own Historians. Vol. IV. p. 365.

Preceded by Alauddin Firuz Shah	Hussain Shahi dynasty 1533–1538	Succeeded by Sur Empire
