= Nasiruddin Nasrat Shah =

Sultan of Bengal from 1519 to 1533

- Sultan of Bengal; Shah of Bengal
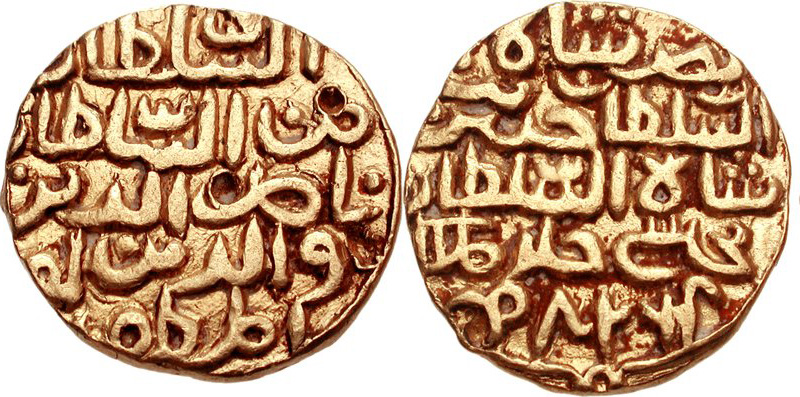
- Gold tanka of Nasiruddin Nasrat Shah

19th Sultan of Bengal
- Reign: 1519–1533
- Predecessor: Alauddin Husain Shah
- Successor: Firuz Shah IV
- Died: 1533
- Spouses: Daughter of Ibrahim Lodi
- Issue: Firuz Shah IV; A son
- Father: Alauddin Husain Shah
- Religion: Sunni Islam

Nāṣir ad-Dīn Naṣrat Shāh (Note: Bengali: নাসিরউদ্দিন নুসরাত শাহ; Persian: ناصر الدین نصرت شاه) (r. 1519–1533), also known as Nusrat Shah, was the second Sultan of Bengal belonging to the Hussain Shahi dynasty. He continued with his father's expansionist policies but by 1526, had to contend with the Mughal ascendency in the Battle of Ghaghra. Simultaneously, Nasrat Shah launched an invasion of the Ahom kingdom. The successful reigns of Alauddin Husain Shah and Nasrat Shah are generally regarded as the "golden age" of the Bengal Sultanate.

== Early life and background ==
Nasrat was born into an aristocratic Sunni Muslim family in the Bengal Sultanate. His father Alauddin Husain Shah was the first Sultan of the Hussain Shahi dynasty and the father of eighteen or twenty four sons and at least eleven daughters. Among Nasrat's siblings were Danyal and Mahmud. Daniyal was initially crown prince as the oldest son of the sultan, but he was killed in battle against the Assamese. Nasrat was made crown prince of Bengal in 1515, upon which he was granted the right to mint coins of his own.

During Husain Shah's expeditions to Tripura, the ruler of Mrauk U kingdom of Arakan helped Dhanya Manikya, the ruler of Tripura and expelled Husain Shah's officers from Chittagong. In 1516, Husain Shah decided to launch an expedition to Arakan. He assigned the charge of the land army for Arakan expedition to Paragal Khan; Nasrat was placed in overall command. On Nasrat's order, Paragal Khan advanced from his base on the Feni River. The expedition of territory to the western bank of Kaladan river was placed under his governorship administration. The hostilities probably ended in 1516, when Mrauk U recognized Bengali sovereignty over Chittagong and northern Arakan. As a result of the conflict, Mrauk U again became a vassal of the Bengal Sultanate. Nasrat renamed Chittagong to Fatehabad, City of Victory. This is also corroborated by Portuguese adventurer Joao de Silvera who, landing in Chittagong in 1517, stated that Arakan was a vassal state of Bengal Sultanate.

Nasrat Shah married a daughter of Ibrahim Lodi, a Pashtun ruler and the last sultan of the neighbouring Delhi Sultanate.

== Reign ==
After his father's death in 1519, Nasrat rose to the throne as Nasiruddin Nasrat Shah. Instead of blinding or imprisoning his brothers, he gave them grand titles and positions in his government. His brother Mahmud had served as an ameer during his brother's reign, at least till 1526, and historian Jadunath Sarkar suggests that Mahmud, whose personal name was Abdul Badr, was the heir apparent due to his early usage of royal insignia.

Following the policies of his father, Nasrat Shah expanded the Sultanate territory early on in his reign and Khalifatabad emerged as an important mint-town. Nasrat took advantage of the collapse of the Lodi authority in Bihar, and entering into an alliance with the Lohani rebels, annexed the lands up to Tons river soon after 1522. Under Nasrat Shah, the Sultanate pushed into the Mithila region and annexed the ruling Oiniwar dynasty in 1526 with the ruler of the Oiniwars, Laksminathasimha, being killed in battle. After conquering Mithila, Nasrat put his brothers-in-law, Alauddin and Makhdum Alam in charge of administration of the conquered region.

Following Babur's invasion of India, Mahmud Lodi and his Afghan confederates fled to Bengal for safety. In 1527, Babur despatched an envoy to Bengal in order to deduce Nasrat Shah's attitude towards Mughal ascendency and collect some information regarding Bengal. Nasrat Shah did not respond and imprisoned the envoy. However, Nasrat Shah later negotiated peace deals and freed the envoy, in order to send gifts to Babur via his own envoy named Ismail Mita. Babur was pleased with the response; describing Nasrat as one of the great rulers of the Indian subcontinent, praising Bengali soldiers for their gunnery and navy, and recognised the loyalty of Bengalis for their leader.

After being pestered by the Afghans, the Mughals declared war against them and their Bengali allies. Attempting to defeat the Afghans on the way, the Mughals proceeded towards Bengal. In response, the Afgan coalition under Mahmud and Sher Khan attacked Chunar and Benaras, while Nasrat sent his general Qutb Khan to attack Lucknow from the rear. However, while Sher was successful in taking Benaras and Qutb Khan fought off several Mughal detachments, Mahmud failed to achieve his objective and fled at the news of Babur's approach. Babur took control of Tirhut before stopping at Buxar, where he requested Bengal to dismiss their troops camped at the banks of the Ghaghara. Nasrat Shah's refusal led to the Battle of Ghaghra, taking place on 6 May 1529, in which the Mughals fought the Afghans and Bengalis. The Mughal Empire were victorious, and their territory extended to the Ghaghara's eastern bank in Bihar though they did not penetrate Bengal. Nasrat Shah sued for peace, and thus maintained Bengal's status as an independent nation. A shrewd ruler, Nasrat understood the futility of fighting the Mughals from the examples of the Lodis and Rajputs, and this avoided joining the Afghans in the battle of Daurah in 1531, in which Humayun defeated the Afghans headed by Mahmud Lodi. Fearing Humayun's retribution nevertheless, Nasrat sent an envoy to Bahadur Shah of Gujarat with a view to concluding a friendly alliance with him, but before the alliance could materialise Nasrat Shah was assassinated by a slave while visiting his father's grave.

Nasrat Shah was possibly buried near Qadam Rasul Mosque in Gaur. Henry Creighton saw the black stone tombs of Alauddin Husain Shah and Nasrat Shah in Gaur, which has disappeared, allegedly carted away by the English. Nasrat Shah was succeeded by his son Firuz, who had served as the governor of Chittagong during his father's reign. However, just three months later Nasrat's brother Mahmud assassinated Firuz Shah and usurped the throne as Ghiyasuddin Mahmud Shah. Another son of Nasrat was the governor of Munger, as stated by Babur in his memoirs, who, along with Lashkar-Wazir Husain Khan, sent his retainer Abul Fa'th to Nasrat to convince his father to start negotiating with Babur after Ghaghra. Nusrat Shah maintained a large number of 914 war elephants.

Nasrat Shah, like his father, maintained a liberal outlook throughout his reign, and ordered the first translation of Mahabharata in Bengali. Jadunath Sarkar asserts that "In his dealings with the Mughals he proved himself an astute diplomatist and a far-sighted statesman." Nasrat also maintained his father's trade relations, and Bengal was a major hub of Asian trade during his reign. In 1521, a Portuguese mission visited Nasrat's court and left vivid descriptions about his court's splendor:

At the end of said courtyard a great dais was set upon thick props of sandalwood, and those above, upon which the roof rested, were not as thick, all carved with … many gilded branches and small birds, and the ceiling above in the same manner with … a moon and a sun, with [a] very great number of stars and all gilded. Then we finally encountered the Sultan, seated in splendour on a large gilded divan covered with… a very large store of great and small pillows, all embroidered, and with many precious stones and seed-pearls on them, and coming before him, we made our reverence to him according to the custom of the land, being with the hands crossed upon the chest and the head bowed as low as possible.

Nasrat ordered the construction of many mosques throughout his kingdom in his reign. Even as a crown prince, Nasrat had commissioned a mosque in Gopinathpur, Chapai Nawabganj in 1516. He completed the building of Bagha Mosque in Rajshahi in 1524, Baro Sona Masjid in Gaur in 1526. In 1527, his Sar-i-Lashkar Mukhtiyar Khan constructed a mosque in Sikandarpur, Azamgarh district in Uttar Pradesh, which indicates his continued hold of the Jaunpuri territory annexed by his father. He also built Nasrat Gazi Mosque in Barishal in 1532.

== See also ==
- List of rulers of Bengal
- History of Bengal

== Bibliography ==
- Mehta, Jl (1984). Advanced Study in the History of Medieval India. Sterling Publishers Pvt. Ltd. ISBN 978-81-207-1015-3.
- Syed, M. H. (2004). History of Delhi Sultanate. Anmol Publications. ISBN 978-81-261-1830-4.
- Eaton, Richard M. (31 July 1996). The Rise of Islam and the Bengal Frontier, 1204-1760. University of California Press. ISBN 978-0-520-20507-9.
- Sarkar, Jadunath, ed. (1943). The History of Bengal. Vol. II: Muslim Period. Delhi: B.R. Publishing Corporation.

Preceded by Alauddin Husain Shah	Sultanate of Bengal; Hussain Shahi dynasty 1519–1533	Succeeded by Alauddin Firuz Shah II
