= Hussain Shahi dynasty =

Bengali dynasty from Arab dissent (1494–1538)

Hōsēn Śāhī হোসেন শাহী
- Royal house
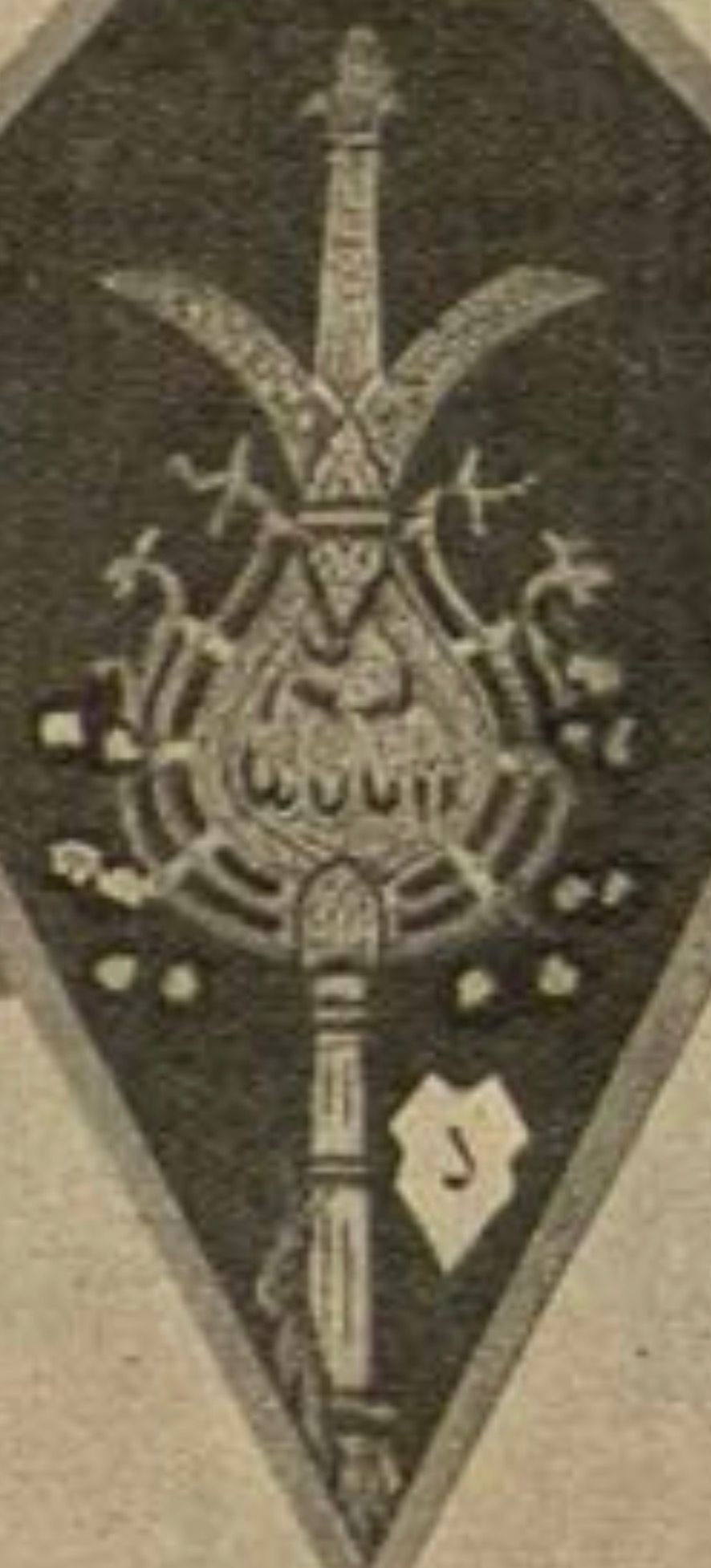
- Alam of Alauddin Husain Shah, the founder of the dynasty (Note: Illustration from the book Progressive Tripura: )

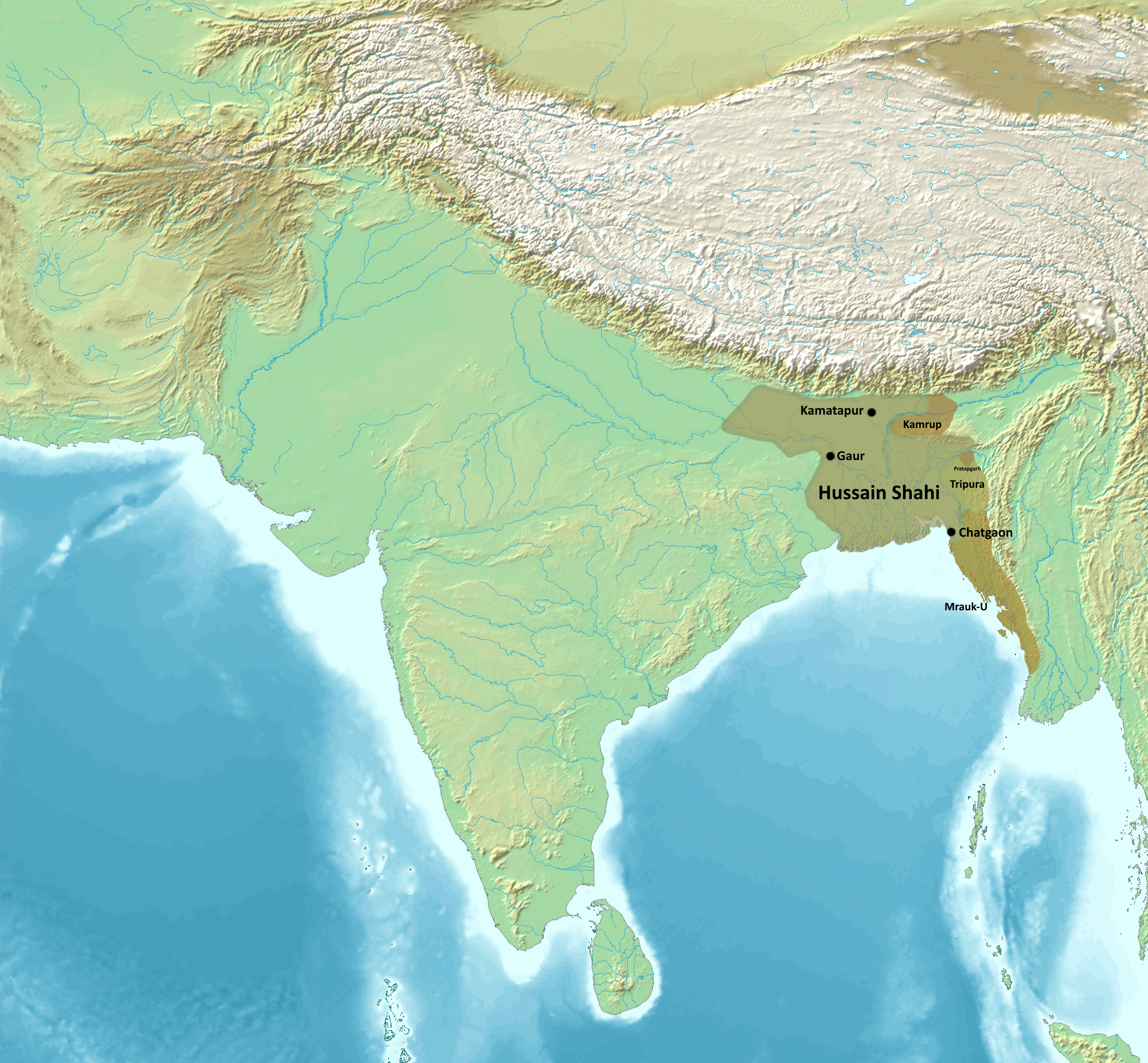
- Map of the Hussain Shahi dynasty of the Bengal Sultanate, including its vassals and occupation in Assam.
- Country: Bengal Sultanate
- Current region: Bengal, Bihar, Tripura and Arakan
- Etymology: Alauddin Husain Shah
- Founded: 1494
- Founder: Alauddin Husain Shah
- Final ruler: Ghiyasuddin Mahmud Shah
- Titles: Sultan
- Members: Alauddin Husain Shah; Nasiruddin Nasrat Shah; Alauddin Firuz Shah II; Ghiyasuddin Mahmud Shah; Syeda Momena Khatun
- Connected members: Ibrahim Danishmand, Khidr Khan Surak, Isa Khan
- Traditions: Sunni Islam
- Estate: Gaur
- Deposition: 1538

The Hussain Shahi dynasty (Middle Bengali: হোসেন শাহী খান্দান) was an Arab Sayyid royal family which ruled the late medieval Sultanate of Bengal from 1494 to 1538.

== History ==
The dynasty's founder, Alauddin Husain Shah was a Muslim of Arab Sayyid lineage. He is considered as the greatest of all the sultans of Bengal for bringing a cultural renaissance during his reign. Known as the Akbar of Bengal, Husain Shah was known by the Hindus of Bengal as Nripati Tilak and Jagatbhusan. He encouraged the translation of Sanskrit literature into the Bengali language and built the Chota Sona Masjid. He conquered Kamrup-Kamata and Orissa and extended the Sultanate all the way to the port of Chittagong, which witnessed the arrival of the first Portuguese merchants. His supposed heir, Shahzada Danyal, who he had appointed as the governor of Kamata, was executed by rebellious chieftains in Assam.

Husain Shah's son and successor, Nasiruddin Nasrat Shah, gave refuge to the Afghans during the invasion of the Timurid warlord Babur, though he remained neutral in the conflict. Nasrat Shah's reign is marked by a period of political instability as he had to deal with the Afghans and the growing Mughal threat. Nasrat Shah's treaty with Babur saved Bengal from a Mughal invasion, which was a diplomatic proposition brought forth following Nasrat Shah's defeat at the Battle of Ghaghra. The construction of the Baro Shona Masjid was completed during the reign of Nasrat Shah, which was originally initiated by Husain Shah. A notable manuscript was also completed during Nasrat Shah's reign, a copy of Nizami's Iskandar Nama.

The last Sultan of the dynasty, Ghiyasuddin Mahmud Shah, who continued to rule from Sonargaon, had to contend with rising Afghan activity on his northwestern border. Eventually, the Afghans under the Sur Empire broke through and sacked the capital in 1538 where they remained for several decades, successively establishing two independent dynasties (Muhammad Shahi and Karrani). However, the Bengal Sultanate collapsed not long after, after the last Karrani ruler, Sultan Daud Khan Karrani was defeated by the Mughal emperor Akbar at the Battle of Rajmahal in 1576, transforming Bengal into a confederacy of chieftains known as the Baro-Bhuiyans. This loose confederacy of Bengal was ruled by Isa Khan, one of Ghiyasuddin Mahmud Shah's grandsons through his daughter Syeda Momena Khatun. Isa Khan led successful resistance to Mughal expansion into Bengal for the next two decades. Isa Khan was subsequently succeeded by his son, Musa Khan who continued to oppose the Mughals until he was forced to submit during the rule of Jahangir. His grandson, Masum Khan, was a mere zamindar.

== Rulers ==
Titular Name(s)	Personal Name	Reign
Sultan `Ala ad-Din سلطان علاء الدين; Bengali: সুলতান আলাউদ্দীন	Husayn Shah حسين شاه; Bengali: হুসেন শাহ	1494–1519
Sultan Nasir ad-Din سلطان ناصر الدين; Bengali: সুলতান নাসিরউদ্দীন	Nasrat Shah نصرت شاه; Bengali: নসরত শাহ	1519–1533
Sultan `Ala ad-Din سلطان علاء الدين; Bengali: সুলতান আলাউদ্দীন	Firuz Shah فيروز شاه; Bengali: ফিরোজ শাহ	1533
Sultan Ghiyath ad-Din سلطان غياث الدين; Bengali: সুলতান গিয়াসউদ্দীন	Mahmud Shah محمود شاه; Bengali: মাহমূদ শাহ	1533–1538
Suri rule takes over Bengal under Sher Shah Suri in 1538 C.E.

== Family tree ==
Hussain Shahi Dynasty

Hussain Shah ?–1519; Sultan of Bengal; R.1494–1519
Daniyal ?–1515	Nasrat Shah ?–1533; Sultan of Bengal; R.1519–1533	Mahmud Shah III ?–1538; Sultan of Bengal; R.1533–1538
Firuz Shah IV ?–1533; Sultan of Bengal; R.1533

== See also ==
- List of rulers of Bengal
- History of Bengal
- List of Sunni Muslim dynasties
