= James Moffat (engraver) =

Scottish engraver

- Born: 1775; Edinburgh
- Died: 1815 (aged 39–40)
- Occupation: engraver

James Moffat (1775–1815) was a Scottish engraver who worked in India during the rule of the East India Company.

== Life ==
He was an ethnic Scotsman but he spent most of his life in India. He had a son named John Moffat who worked as a photographer.

== Career ==
He arrived in Calcutta in 1789 and worked as an engraver there.

He joined the Calcutta Gazette in 1797.

== Legacy ==
His engravings provided a clear picture of street life in Indian cities during the British colonial rule. His engravings have been auctioned by Christie's and are currently preserved in European libraries.
