= Alauddin Husain Shah =

Sultan of Bengal from 1493 to 1519

- Sultan of Bengal; Shah of Bengalis; The right hand and defender of the caliphate Amir al-Mu'minin (the Commander of the Faithful)
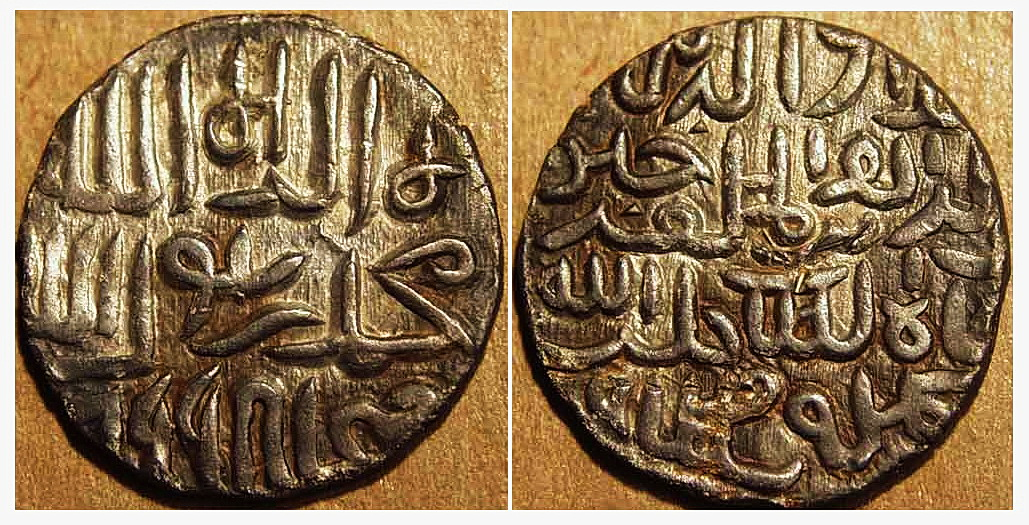
- Silver coin (Tanka) of Alauddin Husain Shah

18th Sultan of Bengal
- Reign: 1493–1519
- Predecessor: Shamsuddin Muzaffar Shah
- Successor: Nasiruddin Nasrat Shah
- Born: Disputed - See Origin and Early life
- Died: 1519
- Spouses: Daughter of the Qazi of Chandpur
- Issue: Shahzada Danyal; Nasiruddin Nasrat Shah; Ghiyasuddin Mahmud Shah; Several others
- Father: Sayyid Ashraf Al-Husaini
- Religion: Islam

Ala-ud-din Husain Shah (Bengali: আলাউদ্দিন হোসেন শাহ; Persian: علاء الدین حسین شاه; r. 1494–1519) was an independent late medieval Sultan of the Bengal Sultanate, who founded the Hussain Shahi dynasty. He became the ruler of Bengal after assassinating the Abyssinian Sultan, Shams-ud-Din Muzaffar Shah, whom he had served under as wazir. After his death in 1519, the oldest surviving of his sons Nusrat Shah succeeded him. Alauddin Husain Shah is regarded as one of the greatest rulers in Bengali history, and the reigns of Husain Shah and Nusrat Shah are generally regarded as the "golden age" of the Bengal Sultanate.

== Origin and early life ==
The origin of the dynasty is not very clear and there are multiple accounts of where it may have originated. However it is widely recognised that the dynasty's founder, Alauddin Husain Shah, was of ultimately Sayyid Arab origin.

Francis Buchanan-Hamilton's writings make mention of a manuscript found in the former Bengali capital Pandua which labels Husain as a native of a village named Devnagar in Rangpur who seized an opportunity to redeem the throne of Bengal that his grandfather, Sultan Ibrahim, had held seventy years prior. There are local traditions in Rangpur which claim that he was indeed a native of that area. It is said that it was Jalaluddin Muhammad Shah who had ousted his grandfather Sultan Ibrahim, and as a result, Husain's father and family migrated to Kamata. Buchanan-Hamilton's manuscript is unnamed, and Momtazur Rahman Tarafdar considers the manuscript to have confused Husain Shah of Bengal with Husayn Shah Sharqi of Jaunpur, whose grandfather was Shamsuddin Ibrahim Shah Sharqi, a contemporary of Jalaluddin Muhammad Shah. Tarafdar, whose work is written in 1965, makes note that there was no Sultan of Bengal in that period by the name of Ibrahim. However, in the 1990s, coins of a Sultan of Bengal by the name of Nasiruddin Ibrahim Shah (r. 1415/16 – 1416/17) were discovered in Beanibazar, Sylhet which has opened discussion regarding this manuscript once again.

Nitish Sengupta asserts that Husain's mother was a Bengali, stating the following

Ala-ud-din Hussain Shah who ruled Gaur between 1493 and 1519 must be given the credit of being the first Bengalee ruler of Gaur. While there are many theories about his origin, he was clearly born of a Bengalee mother and was the first ruler of Gaur who gave encouragement to the newly growing Bengali language. He showed no discrimination between his Hindu and Muslim subjects and fought several wars with neighboring kings in order to consolidate the unclear frontiers of what was eventually to become Bengal.

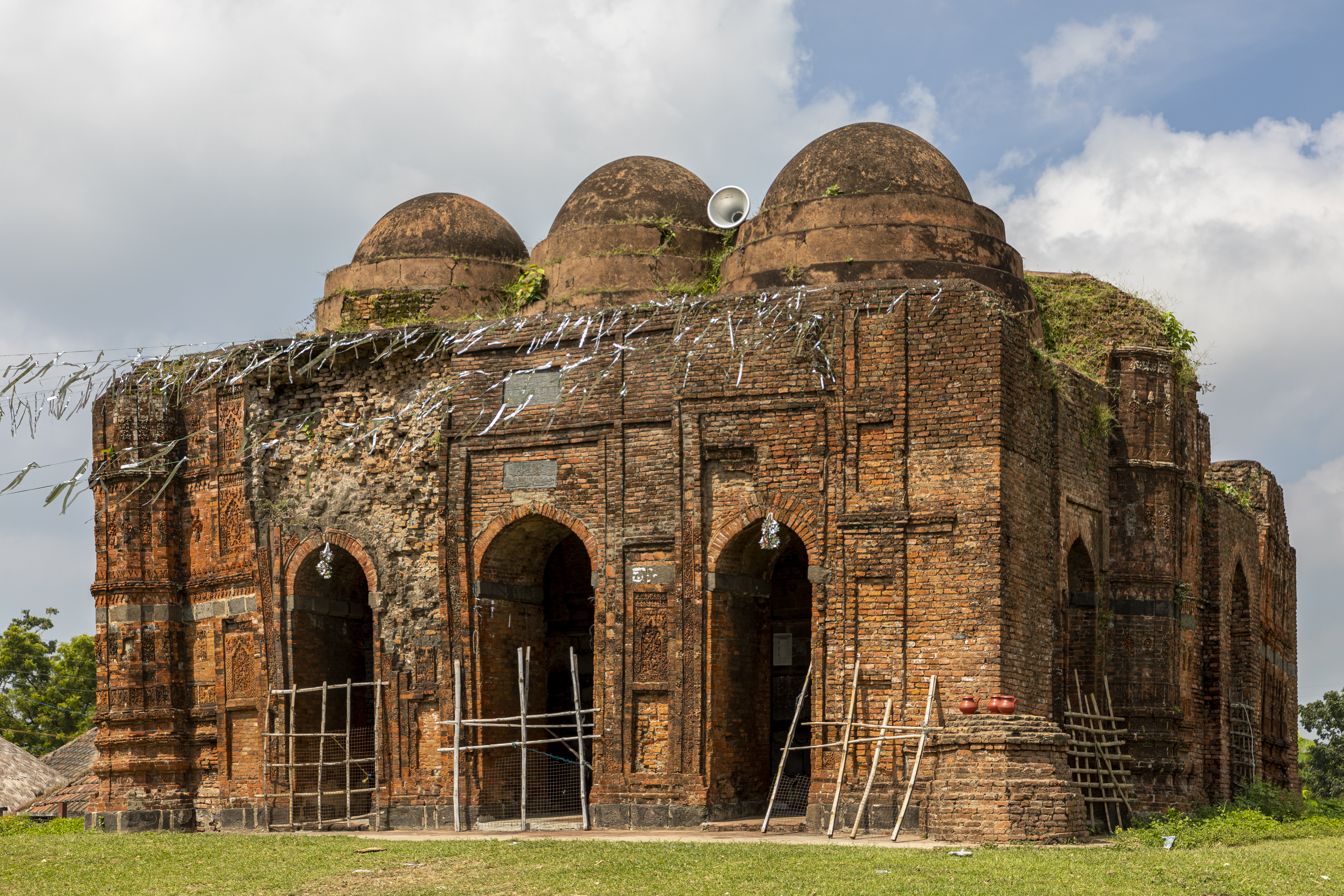
One of the first mosques built by Husain Shah, the Kherur Mosque, in Chandpara, where he reportedly spent much of his childhood.

On the other hand, the Riyaz-us-Salatin mentions Husain's father Sayyid Ashraf Al-Husaini later inhabiting Termez (in Turkestan) for a long period before settling in the Chandpur mouza of Rarh (western Bengal). Husain and his elder brother, Yusuf, spent their childhood studying under the local Qadi, who later married his daughter to Husain due to his noble background. Chandpur is often equated to the village of Chandpara in Murshidabad district, where a number of inscriptions can be founded during the early part of Husain's reign. Husain had also constructed the Kherur Mosque in Chandpara in the first year of his reign in 1494. A lake in this village, called Shaikher Dighi, is also associated with Husain. Krishnadasa Kaviraja, who was born during Husain's reign, claims that the latter worked for Subuddhi Rai, a revenue officer in the erstwhile Bengal's capital Gaur, and was severely whipped during the excavation of a lake. Local traditions in Murshidabad also claim that Husain was the rakhal (cow-keeper) for a Brahmin in Chandpara.

Considering the reference to his employment under Subuddhi Rai, historian Abdul Karim suggests that Husain had a gradual rise in Bengal's government, prior to being appointed wazir under Shamsuddin Muzaffar Shah. He further offers that Husain had been following in the footsteps of his father, Sayyid Ashraf, who Karim tentatively identifies as being the officers Khan Mu'azzam Ashraf Khan and Sayyid A'zam Sayyid Dastur, mentioned in the inscriptions of the last Ilyas Shahi sultans Ruknuddin Barbak Shah and Jalaluddin Fateh Shah respectively. Karim continues that Sayyid Ashraf had been involved in the ascension of the latter, for which he was appointed wazir and acknowledged on the coinage. Karim further suggests that Husain himself may have also taken part in this regime change.

16th-century Portuguese explorer João de Barros mentions the story of a noble Arab merchant from Aden arriving in Chittagong with an army to aid the Sultan of Bengal in conquering Orissa. This merchant later killed the Sultan, thus becoming ruler of Bengal, and according to Heinrich Blochmann, Barros' narrative is in reference to Husain Shah.

== Accession ==
Most sources are in agreement that Husain was appointed the wazir (prime minister) of Sultan Shamsuddin Muzaffar Shah (r. 1491-1493). Initially, Husain secretly sympathized with the rebels but ultimately he put himself openly as their head and besieged the citadel, where Muzaffar Shah shut himself with a few thousand soldiers. According to the 16th-century historian Nizamuddin, the Sultan was secretly assassinated by Husain with the help of the paiks (palace-guards), which ended the Abyssinian rule in Bengal.

== Reign ==
=== Initial administrative actions ===
Immediately after accession to the throne, Husain Shah ordered his soldiers to refrain from plundering Gaur, his capital city. But being annoyed with their continuous plundering, he executed twelve thousand soldiers and recovered the looted articles, which included 13,000 gold plates. Subsequently, he disbanded the paiks (the palace guards) who were the most significant agitators inside the palace. He removed all Habshis from administrative posts and replaced them with Bengalis, Turks, and Afghans.

=== Engagement with the Delhi Sultanate ===
Sultan Hussain Shah Sharqi, after being defeated by Bahlol Lodi, retired to Bihar, where his occupation was confined to a small territory. In 1494, he was again defeated by Sultan Sikandar Lodi and fled to Bengal, where he was granted asylum by Sultan Ala-ud-Din Husain Shah. This resulted in an expedition against Bengal in 1496 by Sultan Sikandar Lodi. Husain Shah of Bengal sent an army under his son Shahzada Danyal to fight with the Delhi army. The armies of Delhi and Bengal met at Barh near Patna. The Delhi army suffered from logistics problems from the beginning of the campaign, and thus Sikandar Lodi halted the advance of his army and concluded a treaty of friendship with Ala-ud-din Husain Shah. According to this agreement, the country west of Barh went to Sikandar Lodi while the country east of Barh remained under Husain Shah of Bengal. The final dissolution of the Jaunpur Sultanate resulted in the influx of the Jaunpur soldiery in the Bengal army, which was further strengthened by it. Moreover, the Lodis could not maintain their dominance over the entirety of the Jaunpuri territory they annexed, leading to Bengali expansion in Uttar Pradesh. This is signified by Alauddin Hussain Shah's numerous inscriptions that record the construction of mosques: a Jama Mosque in Kharid village of Balia district of Uttar Pradesh, another mosque in Sikdarpur, Azamgarh district, Uttar Pradesh, and another mosque in Hussainabad of Balia district in 1501-02, Hussainabad being named after Husain Shah himself. This indicates firm control of Husain Shah in trans-Gandak area of Uttar Pradesh.

=== Conquest of Kamrup-Kamatapur ===
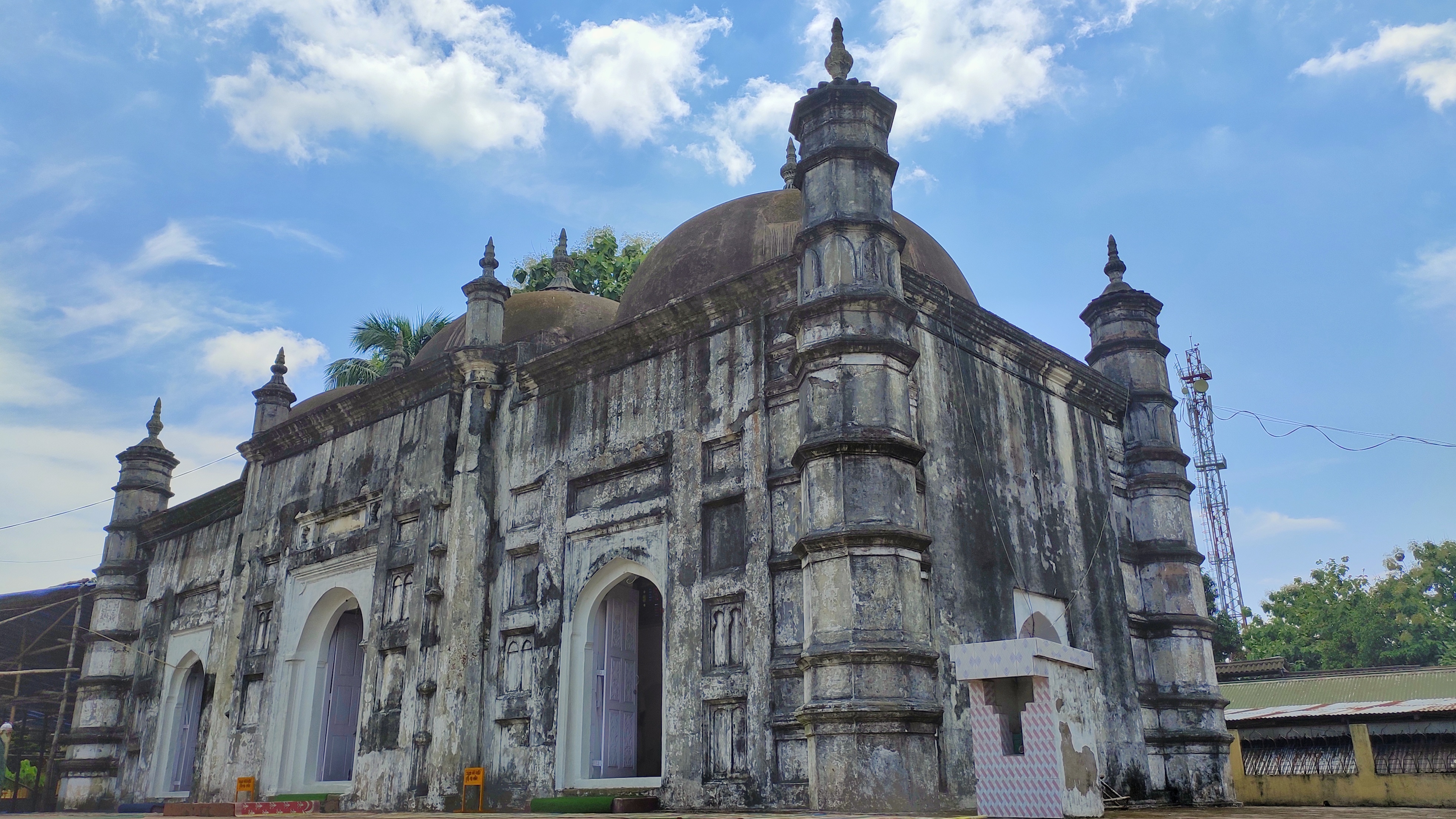
The Panbari Mosque was thought to have been built by Husain Shah to commemorate the Kamata victory.

Nilambar, the Khen dynasty ruler of Kamata Kingdom, had expanded his territory up to Kamrup on the bank of the river Baranadi in the east, and river Karatoya in Bengal in the south. Taking advantage of the Abyssinian anarchy in Bengal, he consolidated his territory by constructing a road from his capital to Ghoraghat in Dinajpur. In response, in 1498, Alauddin Husain Shah prepared to invade Kamatapur. His campaign was aided by the defection of a minister of King Nilambar. In 1499, Husain Shah invaded Kamatapur with his army, which reportedly consisted of 24,000 infantry, cavalry and a war flotilla. Nilambar had taken strong defensive measures in his capital of Kamatapur, and constructed a string of forts across his kingdom, including forts in Sadullapur, Ulipur and Jaldhaka. Husain's army started marching towards Kamatapur by taking fort Fatehpur in Sadullapur, while the navy started from Ekdala. Husain Shah personally defeated the combined army of local kings Rupnarayan, Manakumar, Lakshmana and Lakshmimana, whereas Husain Shah's general, Shah Ismail Ghazi, marched straight to Nilambar's capital. After a long siege, Ismail defeated and imprisoned King Nilambar of Kamata, pillaged and destroyed the capital city and annexed the territory of Kamatapur and Kamrup up to Hajo, 16 miles from Guwahati, the capital of Assam. A colony of Afghans was left behind at Hajo to set up administration, and prince Danyal was appointed viceregent of Kamatapur. The victory was publicly recorded in an inscription at Malda.

=== Odisha campaign ===
According to the Madala Panji, Shah Ismail Ghazi commenced his campaign from the Mandaran fort (in the present-day Hooghly district) in 1508-09 and reached Puri, raiding Jajpur and Katak on the way. The Gajapati King of Orissa, Prataparudra Deva was busy in a campaign in the south. On hearing the news, he returned and defeated the invading Bengal army and chased it into the borders of Bengal. He reached the Mandaran fort and besieged it, where the general had taken shelter. The general managed to escape along with some of his soldiers. Rest of the forces of Bengal were routed, and the fort was besieged by Prataparudra's army. However, due to the treachery of one of Prataprudra's officers, the siege had to be raised and the Orissan soldiers withdrawn. Intermittent hostilities between the Bengal and Orissa armies along the border continued throughout the reign of Husain Shah, and by 1515 Orissa was a vassal of Bengal Sultanate.

=== Expansion in the Northeast ===
When Gouhar Khan, the Bengali governor of Sylhet (in present-day Bangladesh) died, the district was seized by ruler of the neighbouring kingdom of Pratapgarh, Sultan Bazid. One of Husain Shah's nobles named Surwar Khan was sent to confront Bazid and when attempts at negotiations failed, fought against the Sultan and his allies. Bazid was defeated and captured and was forced to give heavy concessions to keep his kingdom, though under the suzerainty of Bengal. In reward for his actions, Surwar Khan was named the new governor of Sylhet and the defeated Sultan's daughter was given in marriage to his son, Mir Khan.

In the northeast Husain Shah extended the boundary of his sultanate beyond Karimganj, up to Kachar district of Assam. This is signified by a inscription found in a mosque built in Kaliganj Bazar, Kachar in 1503-1504 by Sher Malik, the son of Malik Sadami the Magh, which mentions Husain Shah as the ruling sovereign. In 1513, Husain's governor in Sylhet, Rukn Khan, defeated eight tribal chiefs ruling in the borders of Sylhet.

=== Expeditions to Tripura and Arakan ===
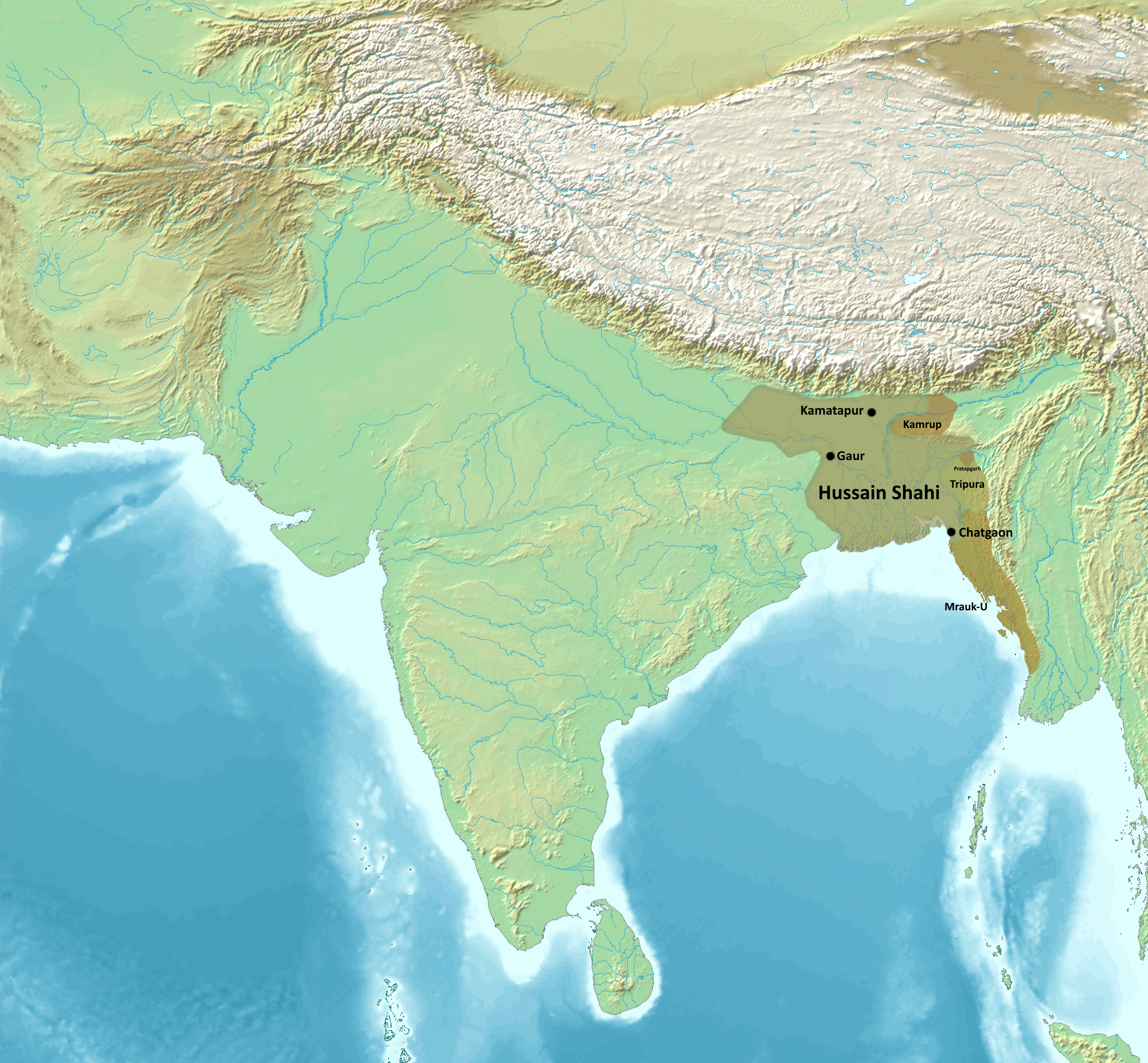
Map of the Hussain Shahi dynasty of the Bengal Sultanate

Illustration derived from the banner of Husain Shah, captured by Dhanya Manikya.

According to Rajmala, a late royal chronicle of Tripura, Husain Shah despatched his army four times to Tripura. The Tripura army offered stiff resistance and did not yield any territory, but in the last expedition, Husain Shah established the fort of Kaliagarh in Tripuri territory (which later became the modern town of Kasba, Brahmanbaria) and succeeded to annex at least some portion of the territory of Tripura. The 1513 Sonargaon inscription of Khawas Khan, entitled Sar-i-Lashkar-i-Tripura (Commander-in-chief of the Army Stationed in Tripura) is interpreted by a number of modern scholars as an evidence of annexure of at least a part of Tripura by Husain Shah.

During Alauddin Husain Shah's expeditions to Tripura, the ruler of Arakan helped Dhanya Manikya, the ruler of Tripura and expelled Husain Shah's officers from Chittagong. In 1516, Husain Shah decided to launch an expedition to Arakan. Husain assigned the charge of the land army for Arakan expedition to Paragal Khan; prince Nasrat, who was made crown prince of Bengal in 1515, was placed in overall command. On Nasrat's order, Paragal Khan advanced from his base on the Feni River. The territory up to the western bank of Kaladan river was placed under his governorship administration. The hostilities probably ended in 1516, when Mrauk U recognized Bengali sovereignty over Chittagong and northern Arakan. As a result of the conflict, Mrauk U again became a vassal of the Bengal Sultanate. Nasrat renamed Chittagong to Fatehabad, City of Victory.

After the conquest, Husain Shah divided Chittagong into six separate shiq or districts, with Ramu being the southernmost district and most prominent. Paragal Khan and Chuti Khan were entrusted to keep Tripura in check, whereas another officer, Khuda Baksh Khan was appointed at the border with Arakan. Amirza Khan was appointed the governor of the port city of Chittagong. Hamid Khan, with his seat at Sitakunda, was entrusted with the job of dealing with the hill tribesmen of Chittagong hill tracts. Husain Shahi victory over Arakan is also corroborated by Portuguese adventurer Joao de Silvera who, landing in Chittagong in 1517, stated that Arakan was a vassal state of Bengal Sultanate.

The Portuguese explorer, Vasco da Gama, arrived India by sea in 1498. Consequently, a Portuguese mission came to Bengal to establish diplomatic relations towards the end of Husain Shah's reign. About Husain Shah's military prowess, Portuguese official Tome Pires wrote:

The king is a Moor, a warrior. He has great renown among the Moors... he fights with heathen kings, great lords and greater than he, but the king of Bengal is nearer to the sea, he is more practiced at war, and he prevails over them.

Husain Shah's long reign of more than a quarter of a century was a period of peace and prosperity, which was strikingly contrast to the period that preceded it. The liberal attitude of Husain Shah towards his Hindu subjects is also an important feature of his reign. Many Brahmins had taken service at his court.

== Cultural contribution ==
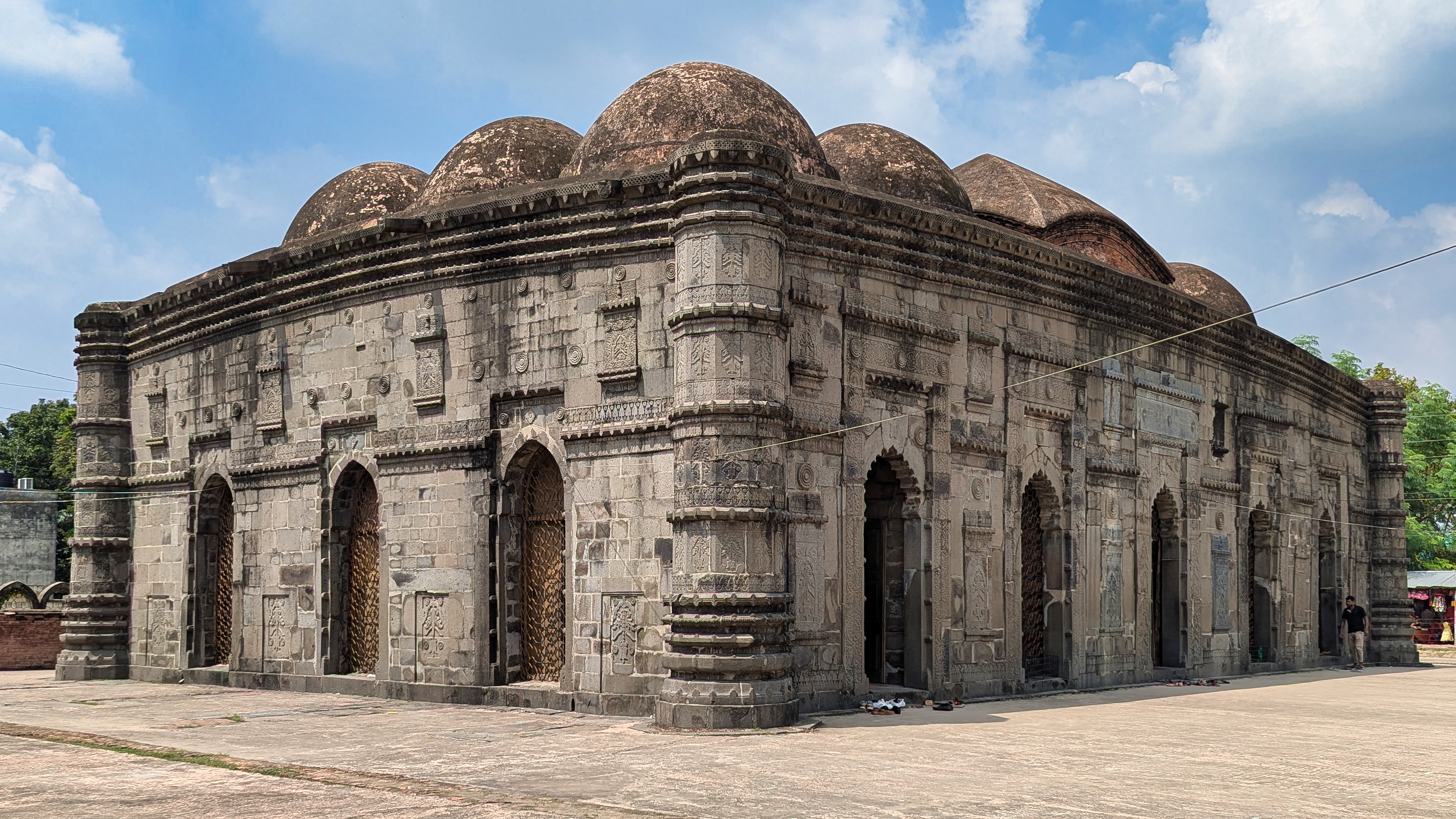
Choto Shona Mosque built during the reign of Alauddin Husain Shah

The reign of Husain Shah witnessed a remarkable development of Bengali literature. Under the patronage of Paragal Khan, Husain Shah's governor of Chittagong, Kabindra Parameshvar wrote his Pandabbijay, a Bengali adaptation of the Mahabharata. Similarly, under the patronage of Paragal's son Chhuti Khan, who succeeded his father as governor of Chittagong, Shrikar Nandi wrote another Bengali adaptation of the Mahabharata. Kabindra Parameshvar in his Pandabbijay eulogised Husain Shah. Bijay Gupta wrote his Manasamangal Kāvya also during his reign. He eulogised Husain Shah by comparing him with Arjuna (samgrame Arjun Raja prabhater Rabi). He mentioned him as Nripati-Tilak (the tilak-mark of kings) and Jagat-bhusan (the adornment of the universe) as well. An official of Husain Shah, Yashoraj Khan, wrote a number of Vaishnava padas and he also praised his ruler in one of his pada. During Husain Shah's reign a number of significant monuments were constructed. Wali Muhammad built Chota Sona Masjid in Gaur.

In 1502 AD, the Sultan ordered a Madrasa to be built "for the teaching of the sciences of religion and for instruction in the principles which lead to certainty, in the hope of obtaining from Allah the great reward and begging from Him that He will ever remain pleased (with him.)"

During his reign, an Islamic scholar known as Shaykh Muhammad ibn Yazdan Bakhsh Bengali visited Ekdala where he transcribed Sahih al-Bukhari and gifted it to the Sultan in Sonargaon. The manuscript is currently kept at the Khuda Bakhsh Oriental Library in Bankipore, Patna, Bihar.

== Religious policy ==
The reign of Husain Shah is also known for religious tolerance towards his subjects. While R.C. Majumdar writes that during his Orissa campaigns he destroyed some Hindu temples, which Vrindavana Dasa Thakura has mentioned in his Chaitanya Bhagavata, he was well known for his tolerance of Hinduism, for which his Hindu subjects named him Nripati Tilak (Crown of Kings) and Jagat Bhushana (Adornment of the Universe)- and many of his previously oppressed Hindu subjects even compared him to an incarnation of Krishna. The celebrated medieval saint, Chaitanya Mahaprabhu and his followers preached Bhakti (Nath-Gopi) throughout Bengal during his reign. When Husain Shah learned of Chaitanya Mahaprabhu's huge following among his subjects, he ordered his qazis not to injure him in any way and allow him to go wherever he liked. Later, two high level Hindu officers in Husain Shah's administration, his Private Secretary, (Dabir-i-Khas) Rupa Goswami and his Intimate Minister (Saghir Malik) Sanatana Goswami became devoted followers of Chaitanya Mahaprabhu. Gaudiya Vaishnavas consider him to be the incarnation of King Jarasandha.

== Death and legacy ==
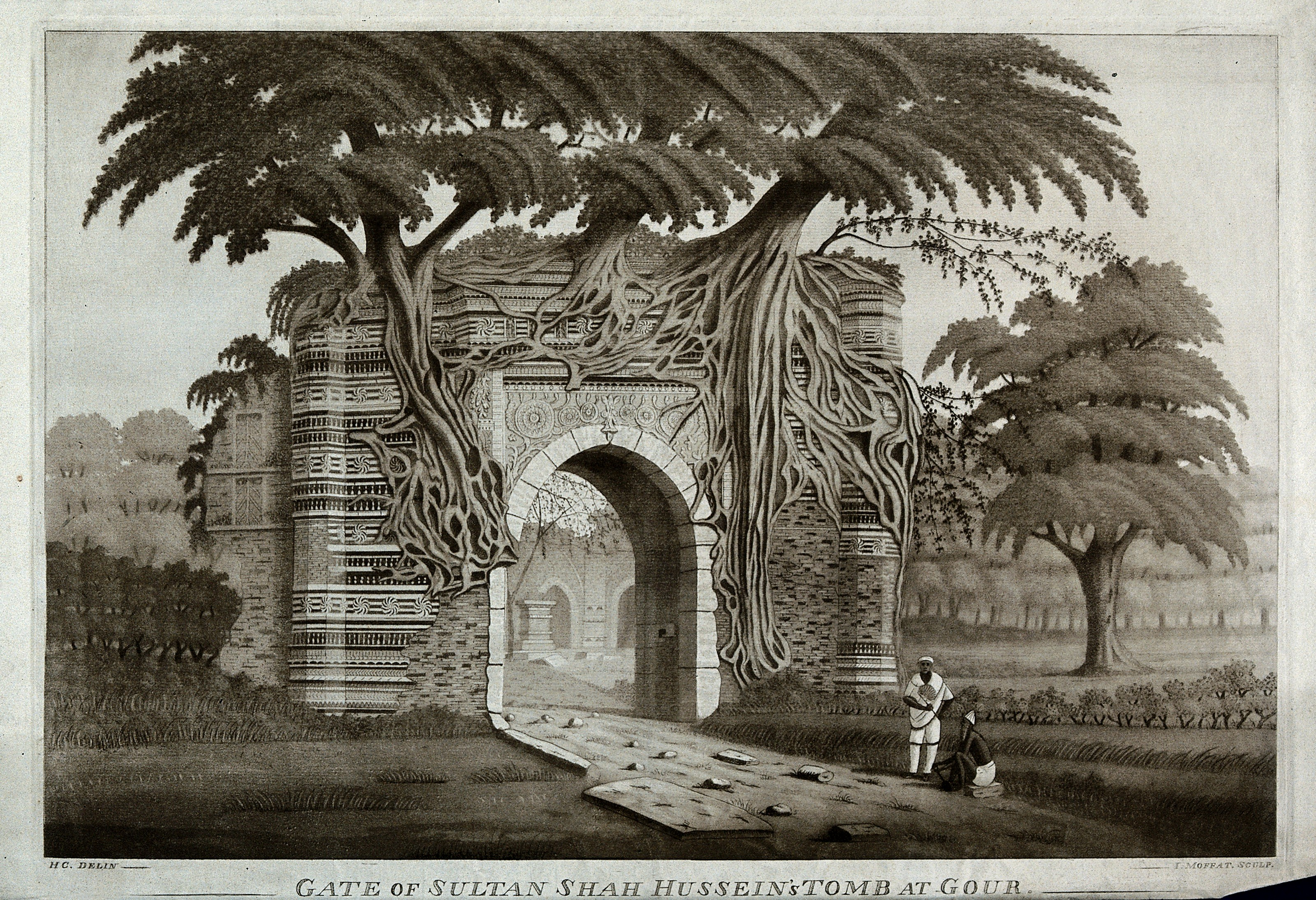
The gateway to the tomb of Husain Shah at Gaur, an etching by James Moffat after Henry Creighton, c. 1808.

Alauddin Husain Shah died in 1519 and was succeeded by his oldest surviving son, Nasrat Shah, who had been the crown prince since 1515. He was possibly buried in Gaur City near the Qadam Rasul Mosque. Henry Creighton saw the black stone tombs of Alauddin Husain Shah and Nasrat Shah in Gaur, which has disappeared, allegedly carted away by the English. About one hundred graves belonging to members of the Husain Shahi dynasty were located in the vicinity of Husain Shah's tomb.

Husain Shah's long reign of more than a quarter of a century was a period of peace and prosperity, which was strikingly contrast to the period that preceded it. Husain Shah had strengthened trade relations with the middle east, and Bengal's economy flourished during his reign. Ludovico de Varthema, who visited Gaur between 1503–1508, recorded: “Fifty ship are laden every year in this place with cotton and silk stuffs... These same stuffs go through all Turkey, through Syria, through Persia, through Arabia Felix, through Ethiopia, and through all India." The liberal attitude of Husain Shah towards his Hindu subjects is also an important feature of his reign. Many Brahmins had taken service at his court. .

R.C. Majumdar summarizes,

Husain was unlucky in not having had an Abul Fazl to record his sayings and glorify his actions, and no contemporary chronicle has survived. But the few facts known of his reign are sufficient clues to the greatness of a ruler who may well be compared with Akbar. Of all the Muslim sovereigns Bengal had had, he captured most the imagination of the people and "the name of Husain Shah the good, is still remembered from the frontiers of Orissa to the Brahmaputra".

== Family and issue ==
According to Riyaz-us-Salatin, which was compiled in 1788, Husain Shah had eighteen sons. He is also said to have at least eleven daughters. However, Portuguese official Tome Pires, who was a contemporary of Husain, wrote in 1515 that Husain Shah had twenty four sons by his concubines, and many daughters. Among these are:

- Danyal: likely the eldest son. Served as viceregent of Kamatapur during his father's reign, may have been killed at the end of the campaign on Kamata kingdom. During his viceroyalty, his concubine Lal Bai established the town of Lalbazar in Kamatapur. According to the Assam Buranji, Danyal's son Musunder Ghazi succeeded him as governor of Kamatapur, but had died before 1515.
- Nasiruddin Nasrat Shah alias Ali Shah: was made crown prince of Bengal in 1515; succeeded his father. Reigned as Sultan of Bengal from 1519 to 1532.
- Ghiyasuddin Mahmud Shah: born as Abdul Badr, reigned as Sultan of Bengal from 1533 to 1538.
- Qutbuddin Nasir: A son of Husain Shah, he constructed a Jami Mosque in Matihani village, Munger, Bihar.
- Raushan Akhtar Banu: possibly a granddaughter. Married Ibrahim Danishmand, a Sufi saint and landowner.
- A daughter: married Jalal Khan, son of Hussain Shah Sharqi, erstwhile sultan of Jaunpur.
- A daughter: married Kandarpadeva, a son of the Brahmin Madan Bhaduri of Bhaturia. Kandarpadeva converted to Islam before their marriage.
- A daughter: married another son of Madan Bhaduri of Bhaturia, who also converted to Islam before their marriage.
- A daughter: married Makhdum Alam, governor of Bihar.
- A daughter: married Alauddin, a general of her brother Nasrat Shah.
- A daughter: married Alfa Husaini, an Arab merchant, who assisted with ships and materials for prince Nasrat's conquest of Chittagong.

In 1659, a descendant of Husain Shah named Saiyid Ambia received, by order of the Mughal emepror Aurangzeb, a grant of 50 bighas of rent-free land for the maintenance of the royal Husain Shahi tombs at Gaur. His descendant, Mir Hansa, was still in possession of the land in 1863.

== See also ==
- List of rulers of Bengal
- History of Bengal
- History of Bangladesh
- History of India
- Isa Khan

== Notes ==
Preceded by Abyssinian rule (Shamsuddin Muzaffar Shah)	Sultanate of Bengal; Hussain Shahi dynasty 1493–1519	Succeeded by Nasiruddin Nasrat Shah
