= Bakerganj Upazila =

Bakerganj বাকেরগঞ্জ
- Upazila
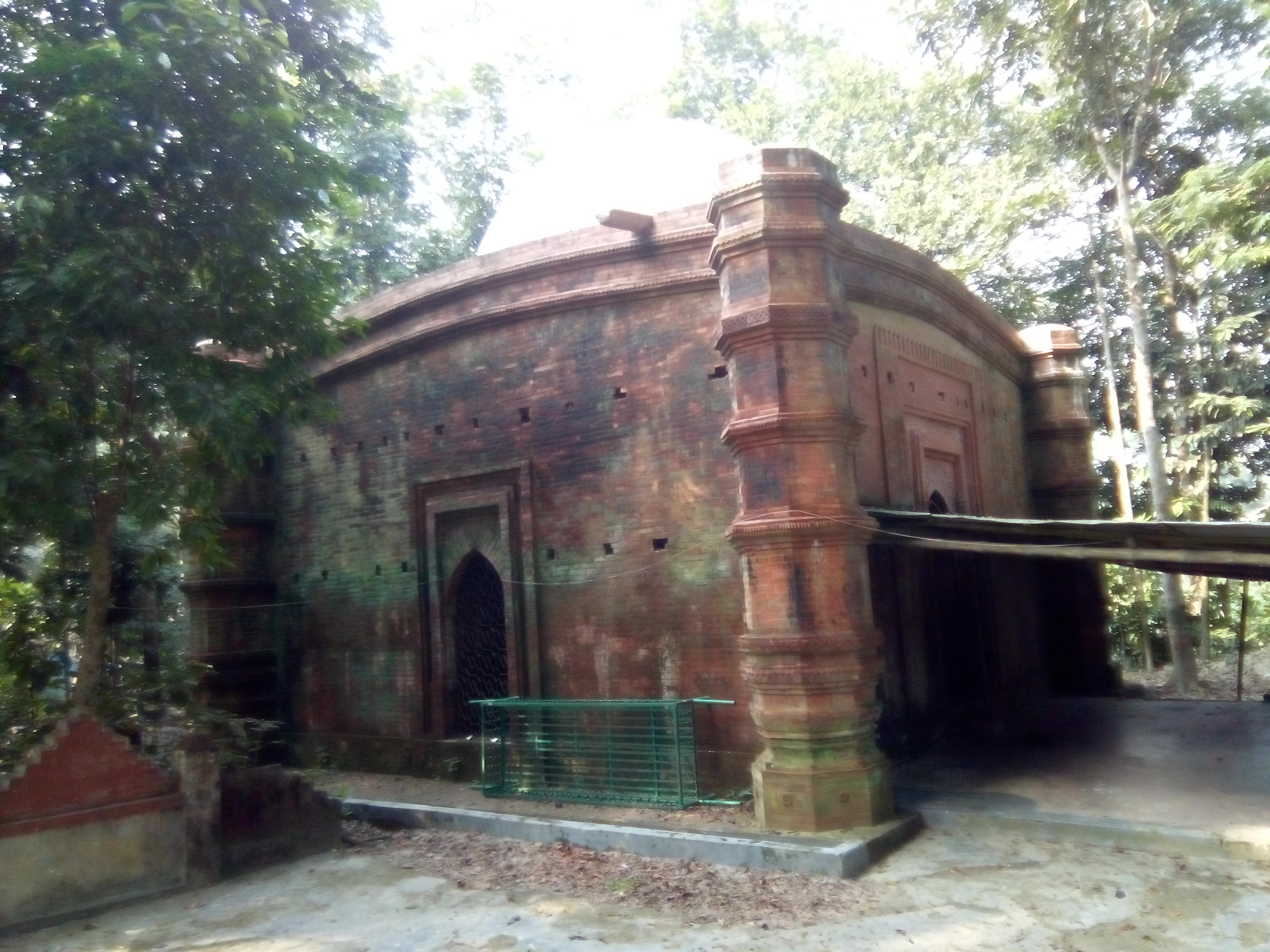
- Nasrat Gazi Mosque

- Coordinates: 22°33′N 90°20.3′E
- Country: Bangladesh
- Division: Barisal
- District: Barisal
- Headquarters: Bakerganj

Area
  - Total: 411.36 km^{2} (158.83 sq mi)

Population (2022)
  - Total: 356,022
  - Density: 865.48/km^{2} (2,241.6/sq mi)
- Time zone: UTC+6 (BST)
- Postal code: 8280
- Area code: 04328
- Website: Official Map of the Bakerganj Upazila

Bakerganj (Bengali: বাকেরগঞ্জ) is an Upazila of Barisal District in Barisal Division, Bangladesh.

== Geography ==
Bakerganj is located at 22.5500°N 90.3389°E. It has a total area of 411.36 km^{2} (158.83 sq mi). The upazila shares its boundaries with Nalchity Upazila and Barisal Sadar Upazila to the north, Mirzaganj Upazila, Dumki Upazila, and Bauphal Upazila to the south, Bauphal Upazila and Bhola Sadar Upazila to the east, and Nalchity Upazila, Betagi Upazila, and Rajapur Upazila to the west.

== Demographics ==
Historical population
Year	Pop. (000)	±%
1981	312	—
1991	337	+8.0%
2001	354	+5.0%
2011	314	−11.3%
2022	356	+13.4%
Source: Bangladesh Bureau of Statistics

Religions in Bakerganj Upazila (2022)
Religion	Percent
Islam	91.23%
Hinduism	8.48%
Other or not stated	0.29%

According to the 2022 Bangladeshi census, Bakerganj Upazila had 87,974 households and a population of 356,022. 9.13% of the population were under 5 years of age. Bakerganj had a literacy rate (age 7 and over) of 79.93%: 82.06% for males and 77.95% for females, and a sex ratio of 94.59 males for every 100 females. 59,510 (16.72%) lived in urban areas.

According to the 2011 Census of Bangladesh, Bakerganj Upazila had 71,537 households and a population of 313,845. 72,647 (23.15%) were under 10 years of age. Bakerganj had a literacy rate (age 7 and over) of 63.27%, compared to the national average of 51.8%, and a sex ratio of 1107 females per 1000 males. 19,492 (6.21%) lived in urban areas.

== Administration ==
Bakerganj Upazila is divided into Bakerganj Municipality and 14 union parishads: Bharpasha, Charadi, Char Amaddi, Darial, Dudhal, Durgapasha, Faridpur, Garuria, Kabai, Kalashkati, Nalua, Niamati, Padri Shibpur, and Rangasree. The union parishads are subdivided into 149 mauzas and 172 villages.

== See also ==
- Upazilas of Bangladesh
- Districts of Bangladesh
- Divisions of Bangladesh
- Thanas of Bangladesh
- Union councils of Bangladesh
- Dudhalmou
- Padri Shibpur
