= Ulania Union =

Ulania Union উলানিয়া
- Union
- Location in Bangladesh
- Coordinates: 22°51.4′N 90°36.5′E
- Country: Bangladesh
- Division: Barisal Division
- District: Barisal District

Area
  - Total: 22.50 km^{2} (8.69 sq mi)

Population (2003)
  - Total: 36,000
- Time zone: UTC+6 (BST)
- Website: ulaniaup.barisal.gov.bd

Ulania (Bengali: উলানিয়া) is a union parishad of Mehendiganj Upazila in Barisal District, Barisal Division, Bangladesh.

In Ulania town, there are the ancient ruins of the palaces, mosques of a local Lord (called Jamidar in Bengali). 'The Dark House' (called Ondho Kutir in Bengali) which is believed to be the house where Jamidars' brought rebels who were against them and let them starve until their death. Strong figures such as Asad Chowdhury (a prominent poet), Abdul Gaffar Choudhury (writer of Amar Bhaier Rokte Rangano), Wahed Reza Chowdhury (one of the leader of Khilafat Movement) and many more creative faces were born in this locality.

== Geography ==
Ulania is located at 22.85627°N 90.60899°E. It has a total area of 22.50 km^{2}. The town is located beside the Sultani River linked from the Meghna river in the north to the Tentulia River in the south. It is bordered by Gobindapur Union in the north east, Bhola Sadar in the south east, Chandpur and Char Ekkaria union in the west, also briefly touched by Dharmaganj River in the north and Tentulia River in the south.

The annual monsoon rains from July to September is both a blessing and a curse for the people of Bangladesh. In 2007, the river Meghna engulfed more than 12,000 acres (49 km^{2}) of land, making almost forty thousand people landless. Not enough has been done to rehabilitate the affected people or stop the erosion, compelling locals to help each other with their limited resources. It's not just the poor who are affected by the floods. In the last 300 years, the feudal landlord (zamindar) of Ulania of Mehendigonj built an estate of 100 magnificent architectural buildings which are also under the threat of Meghna erosion.

== Demographics ==
At the 2001 Bangladesh census, Ulania had a population of 36000. Males constituted 18,572 of the population, and females 17,428. Ulania had an average literacy rate of 75% (7+ years), against the national average of 60%.

== Administration ==
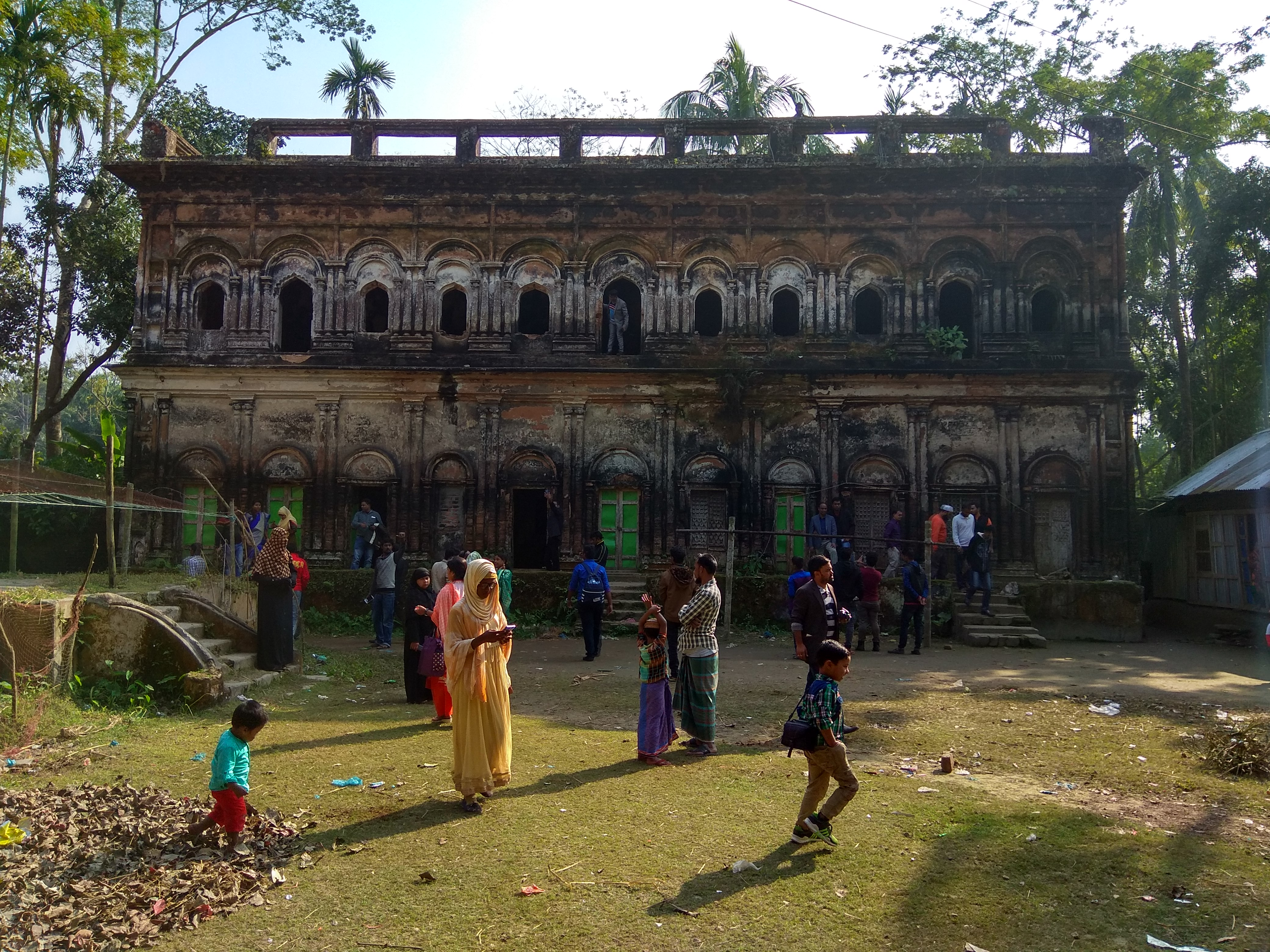
Ulania Zamindar Bari is a centuries-old landlord palace located in Mehendiganj Upazila

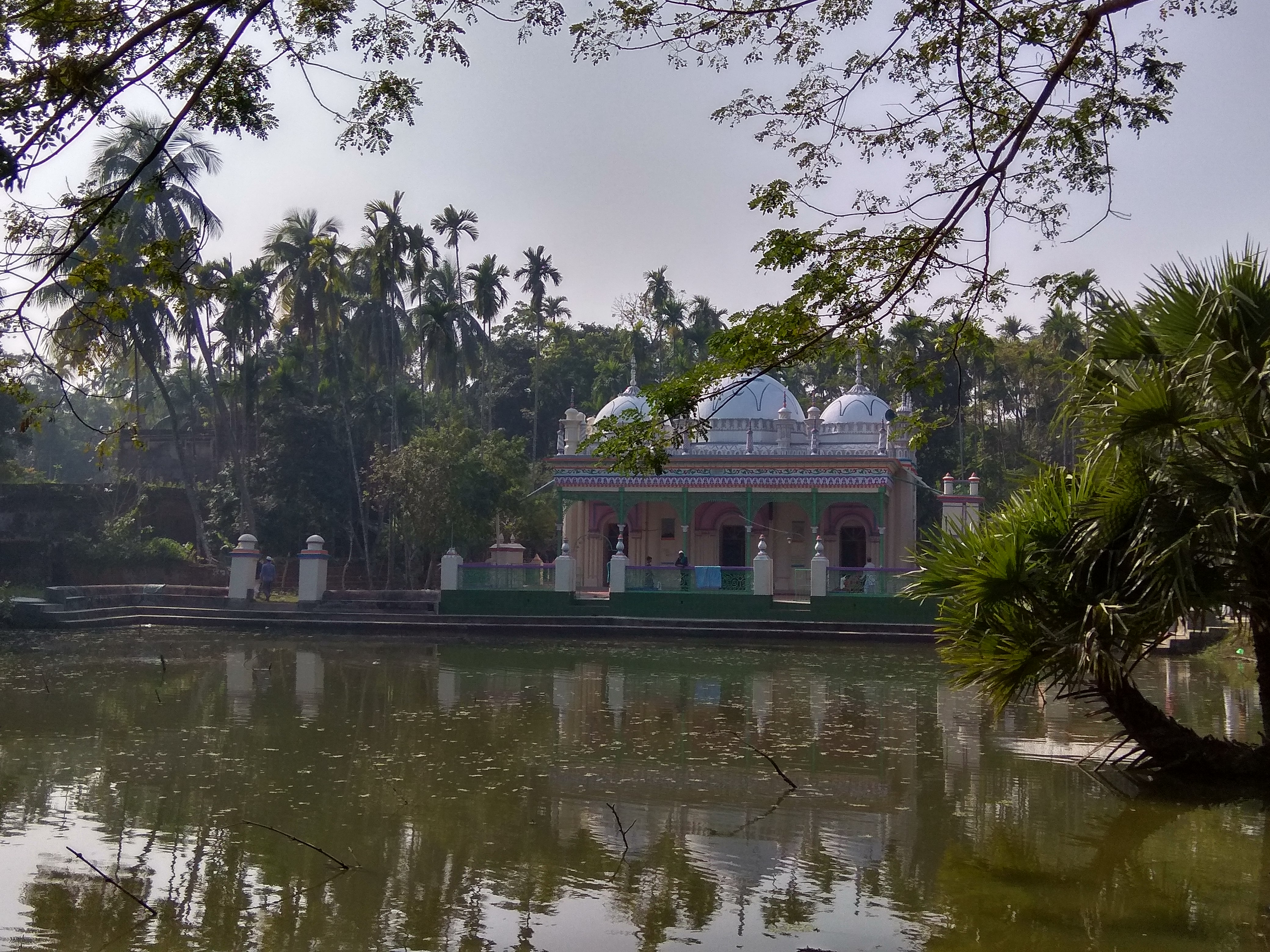
Ulania Zamindar Bari Masjid, established in 1861 by Ulania Zamindar family

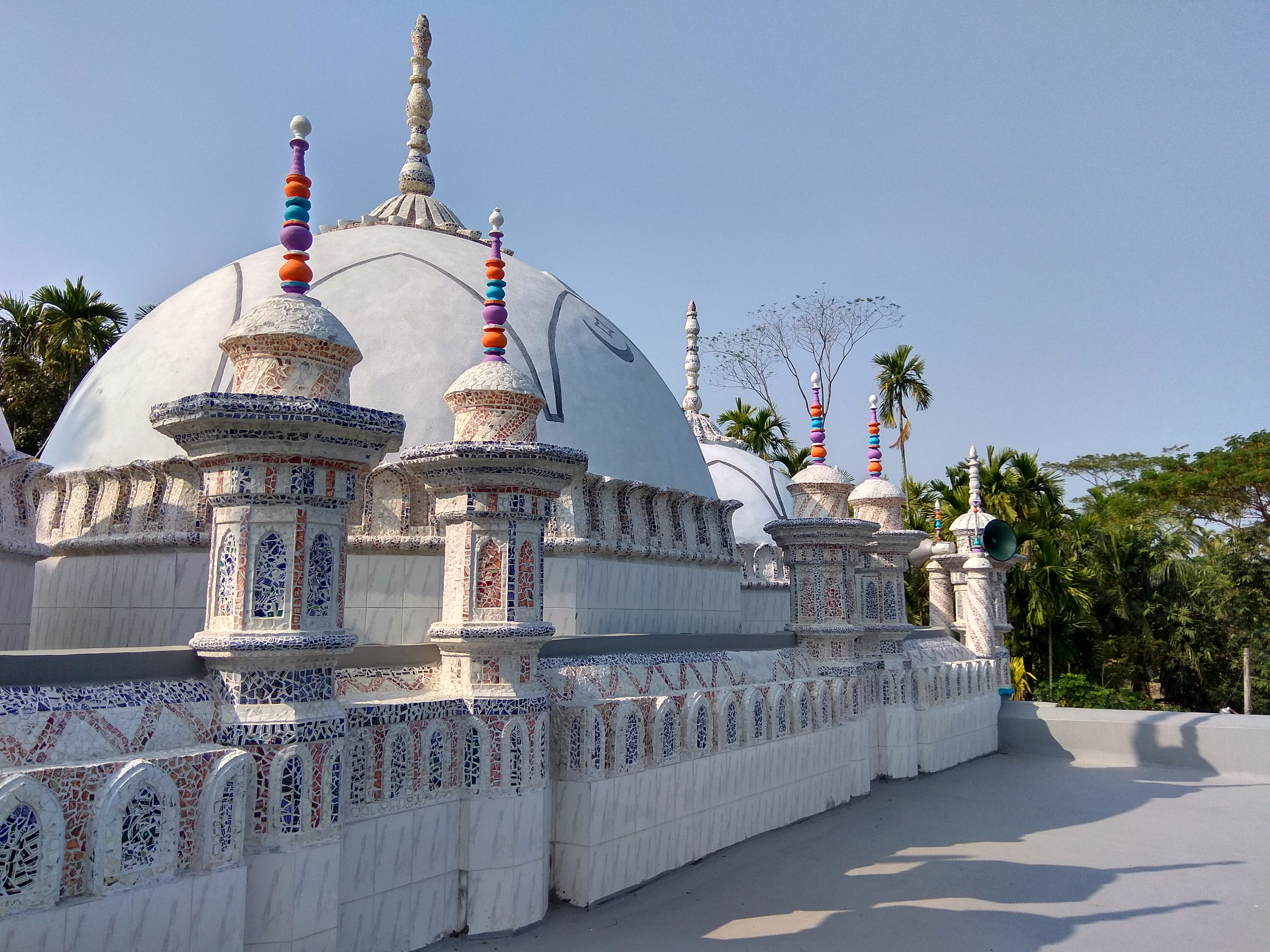

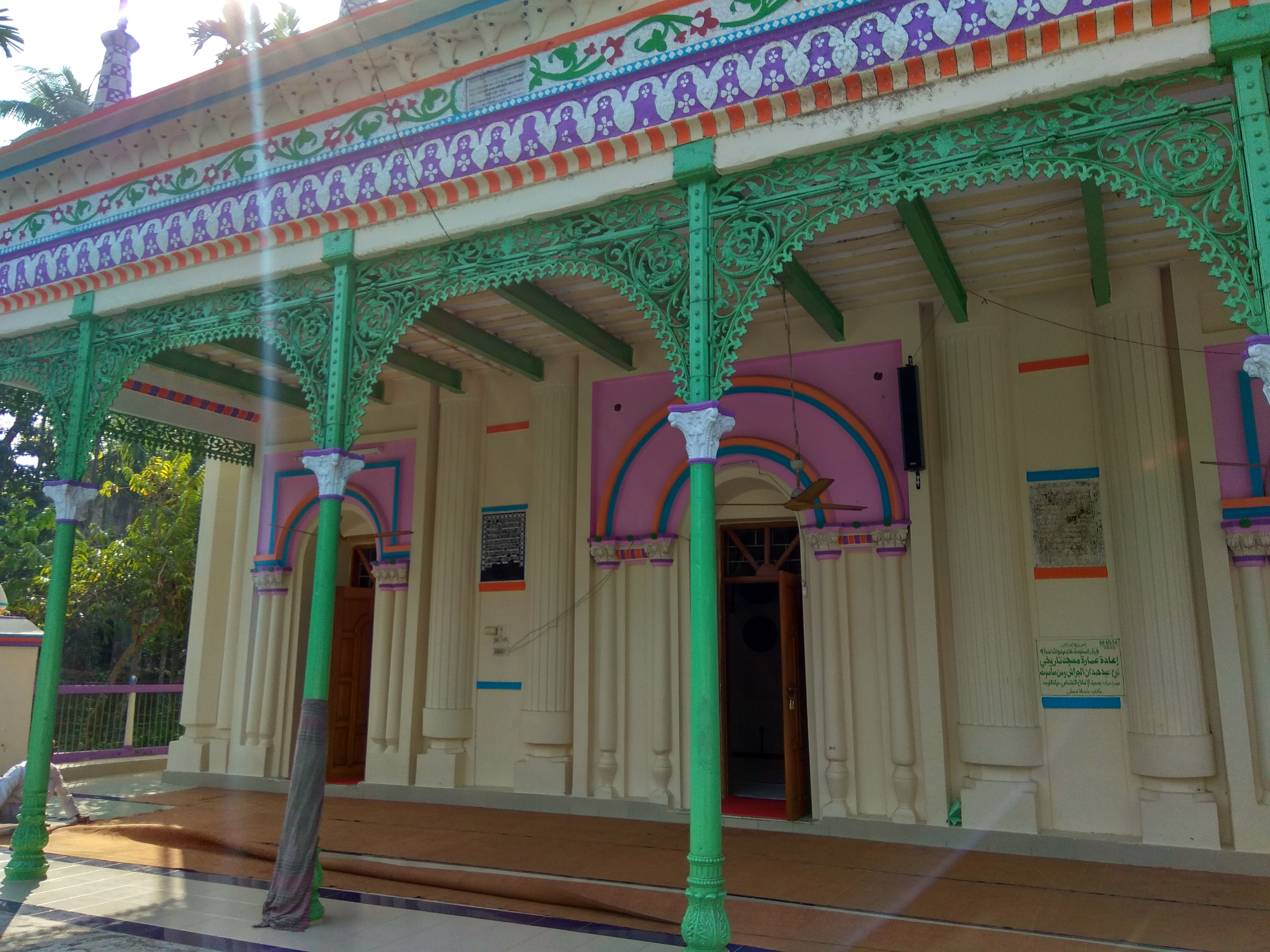

Ulania has 13 villages, 13 mouzas, 4 bazars, 2 waterbodies. Every five year the election take place to elect local government heads known as chairman. The lower branch of chairman are called members. There are 19,605 of total voters in which 10,161 are male and 9,444 are female voters.

=== Villages ===
- Asha
- Balia
- Harni
- Hassanpur
- Hogultory
- Lalganj
- Mollikpur
- Nayakhali
- Nayonpur
- Purboshatti
- Rajapur
- Sultani
- Soldi
- Palpara
- Ulania: The capital of the union is located beside a canal adjacent to Ulania.

=== Bazaars ===
- Hazir Hut: Organised every Friday, Sunday and Wednesday and is the smallest hut than any other. It starts at around 4pm and ends at 7pm. People who mainly lives in Sultani are the main customers.
- Lalganj Hut:
- Master Hut
- Ali Gonj Hut
- Ulania Hut: The main hut organised every Monday and Thursday. The busiest day is Monday. People from every villages gather in Ulania from afternoon until midnight. Since this is the second biggest town of Mehendiganj after Patarhat so sellers and customers come from every unions.

== Transport ==
The main transport used by the local people to travel one village to another village is rickshaw, bicycle, motorbikes etc. In the main roads people usually use auto rickshaw (known as tempo (Bengali: টেম্পু) by the local people) to travel one place to another place faster. Motorbikes are also used as a term of transport for carrying passengers as well. Since this place is an island – ship, trawlers, speedboats, river liners (known as launch লঞ্চ) are the main transports to travel into various cities. Everyday lunch arrives in Mollikpur port & Sultani port to exchange passengers. Passengers may need to take trawlers (Bengali: ট্রলার) to go to Sultani port because there is no road that will take you to the port.

== Amenities ==
Ulania provides amenities for the local people, such as lodging and cash withdrawal, typical even in rural areas of Bangladesh. The closest main town is Patarhat. Ulania Union provides two banks in the centre of the town – Agrani Bank and Krishi Bank. There is a government-owned hospital and a post-office service as well.

There are also places for entertainment. There are two large fields to play cricket, football, volleyball, badminton, as well as various other sports. There are two cinemas called Meghna Cinema Hall and Padma Cinema Hall.

== Education ==
There are six Coronation schools all over the country, one of which is located in the heart of the town. Some well known literate, columnist, poet, politicians were born in this union.

- College: 1 (non govt.)
- Secondary School: 3 (non govt.)
- Primary School: 10 (govt.), 10 (non govt.)
- Madrasa: 3 (non govt.)
- Kindergarten: 1 (non govt.)

=== Institutions ===
- Ulania Coronation High School
- Ulania Girls' High School
- Nopaya Hogultury Hamidia Fazil Madrasah
- Ulania Muzaffar Khan (Degree) College
- Harni Haria Erob Sharkari Prathomik Biddaloy

Library

- Pierre Elliot Trudeau Library cum Cultural Centre, Ulania

== Notable residents ==
- Asad Chowdhury
- Abdul Gaffar Choudhury
- Atiqul Haque Chowdhury, drama producer and director

== See also ==
- Upazilas of Bangladesh
- Districts of Bangladesh
- Divisions of Bangladesh
- Thanas of Bangladesh
- Union Councils of Bangladesh
