= Mohiuddin Ahmed (Barisal politician) =

Bangladeshi politician

- মহিউদ্দিন আহমেদ

Member of Parliament for Bakerganj-10
- In office 7 March 1973 – 6 November 1976

Member of Parliament for Barisal-4
- In office 27 February 1991 – 15 February 1996
- Preceded by: Maidul Islam
- Succeeded by: Shah M. Abul Hussain

Personal details
- Born: 1 March 1934 Patarhat, Barisal District
- Died: 14 February 2002 (aged 67)
- Party: Bangladesh Awami League
- Children: Shammi Ahmed

Mohiuddin Ahmed (1 March 1934 – 14 February 2002) was a politician from Barisal District of Bangladesh. He was elected a member of parliament from Bakerganj-10 and Barisal-4.

== Career ==
Mohiuddin Ahmed began his career as an activist and party worker of the East Pakistan Muslim League. Due to his aggressive and rough tactics in the political field, he was given the nickname "Pistol Mohiuddin". In the 1970 East Pakistan Provincial Assembly election he was elected as an MPA from Bakerganj-10 as an All-Pakistan Awami League candidate.

Mohiuddin Ahmed was elected to the Jatiya Sangsad from Bakerganj-10 as an Awami League candidate in 1973.

He was elected a member of parliament from the Barisal-4 constituency as a Bangladesh Awami League candidate in the 1991 Bangladeshi general election. He lost the 1996 election to Shah M. Abul Hussain of the BNP, after which he retired from politics.

== Death and legacy ==
Mohiuddin died in 2002. His daughter, Dr. Shammi Ahmed, currently serves as the international affairs secretary of the Awami League. She was given the nomination to contest the 2024 Bangladeshi general election from the Awami League instead of Pankaj Debnath (former president of the Swechasebak League and ex-MP from Barisal-4). However, Shammi's nomination was cancelled by the election commission due to her having Australian citizenship. She was later made an MP from Awami League's reserved seat for women. She remained an MP until the fall of Sheikh Hasina's government. Shammi has been in hiding since August 5, 2024.
