= Abdul Latif (musician) =

Bangladeshi singer, musician, and lyricist

- আব্দুল লতিফ
- Born: 1927; Raipasha village, Barisal District, Bengal, British India
- Died: 26 February 2005 (age 78); Dhaka, Bangladesh
- Resting place: Martyred Intellectuals' Graveyard, Mirpur, Dhaka
- Children: Serajus Salekin (Tagore's song artiste), Saira Latif

Abdul Latif (1927 – 26 February 2005) was a Bangladeshi singer, musician, and lyricist. He was the initial composer of the Bengali language movement song, "Amaar Bhaiyer Rakte Rangano Ekushey February". He was awarded Ekushey Padak in 1997 and Independence Day Award in 2002 by the Government of Bangladesh.

== Early life ==
Latif was born at Raipasha village in Barisal Sadar. After matriculating from Ruphshahya High School, he went to Kolkata for higher education. He started singing for the Congress Literature Group from the age of 16.

== Career ==
He moved to Dhaka in July 1948 and joined Radio Pakistan as a staff artiste. He started writing songs since then. He wrote over 1500 songs. Latif was a government officer in various capacities from 1974 to 1993.

In 1953, first Latif composed the song Amar Bhaier Rokte Rangano, written by Abdul Gaffar Choudhury which is later re-composed to the current form by Altaf Mahmud. He wrote songs like Ora Amar Mukher Kotha, Ami dam diye kinechi Bangla and Shona Shona Shona Lokey Boley Shona.

== Bibliography ==
His publications include Duare Aishachhe Palki from Bangladesh Folklore Parishad, Bhashar Gaan, Desher Gaan from Bangla Academy and Dilrobab from Islamic Foundation.

== Awards ==
- Ekushey Padak (1997)
- Independence Day Award (2002)
