= Goila =

Goila গৈলা Gaila
- Village
- Location in Bangladesh
- Coordinates: 22°57′0″N 90°11′0″E
- Country: Bangladesh
- Division: Barisal Division
- District: Barisal District
- Upazila: Agailjhara Upazila

Area
  - Total: 1.83 km^{2} (0.71 sq mi)

Population (2022)
  - Total: 2,369
  - Density: 1,290/km^{2} (3,350/sq mi)
- Time zone: UTC+6 (Bangladesh Time)

Goila or Gaila is a village in Agailjhara Upazila of Barisal District in the Barisal Division of southern-central Bangladesh.

According to the 2022 Census of Bangladesh, Goila had 568 households and a population of 2,369. It has a total area of 1.83 km^{2} (0.71 sq mi).

== History ==
The village used to be known as Panditnagar as it was home to poets, vaidyas and kabirajs. It was later settled by Faujdar Sabi Khan and his group, and got its name from Gola-Barud, the Perso-Bengali word for ammunition, as they used to produce ammunition here. The present Gaila Das Bari is thought to have been Sabi Khan's home due to the foundations discovered in the brick walls of the residence.

== Tourist attraction ==
- Poet Vijay Gupta's Mansa Devi Temple
- Gaila Zamindar Bari

== Notable people ==
- Kusumkumari Das
- Amiya Kumar Dasgupta
- Ajoy Dasgupta
- Surendranath Dasgupta
- Maitreyi Devi
- Manindra Gupta
- Sabi Khan
- Tarakeswar Sengupta
