= Alimabad, Barisal =

Alimabad আলিমাবাদ
- Village
- Location in Bangladesh
- Coordinates: 22°45′N 90°32′E
- Country: Bangladesh
- Division: Barisal Division
- District: Barisal District
- Upazila: Mehendiganj Upazila

Population (2022)
  - Total: 3,041
- Time zone: UTC+6 (Bangladesh Time)

Alimabad is a village in Mehendiganj Upazila of Barisal District in the Barisal Division of southern-central Bangladesh.

According to the 2022 Census of Bangladesh, Alimabad had 765 households and a population of 3,041.
