= Manindra Gupta =

Indian Bengali poet, writer and painter (1926–2018)

- Born: September 24, 1926; Goila, Backergunge District, British India (present day in Bangladesh)
- Died: January 31, 2018 (aged 91); Kolkata, West Bengal, India
- Occupation: novelist
- Spouse(s): Chiru Chowdhury; Debarati Mitra
- Writing career
- Language: Bengali
- Notable awards: Rabindra Puraskar (2010); Sahitya Academy Award (2011)

Manindra Gupta (24 September 1926 – 31 January 2018) was an Indian Bengali poet, essayist, novelist and painter. He received the Rabindra Puraskar from the Government of West Bengal in 2010 and the Sahitya Akademi Award in 2011 for his poetry collection Bane Aaj Concerto.

== Early life ==
Manindra Gupta was born as Manindranath Dasgupta, in Gaila village , Barisal District (now in Bangladesh), in undivided Bengal during British India. He lost his mother at ten months old. After his paternal grandparents' deaths in 1933, he was raised in Silchar, Barak Valley, Assam at his maternal uncle's home. He completed school education in 1941 before moving to Kolkata. He joined the British Indian Army in 1943, received engineering training, and was posted at Lahore Cantonment until his service ended in 1946. He graduated from the University of Calcutta in 1956, then worked in the West Bengal Government's Industries Department until retiring in 1984.

His father, Nagendranath Dasgupta, was a highly influential Ayurveda physician from Gaila during his time. After his mother’s death, Manindra Gupta was raised by his stepmother, Shantilata Dasgupta. He also had a step-brother, Shailendranath Dasgupta.

== Literary career ==
His autobiographical trilogy Akshay Malberi (1981–2004), featuring his own illustrations, was critically acclaimed for its profound exploration of memory and identity. His 1991 essay collection Chander Opith (The Far Side of the Moon) created significant literary impact.

According to his Sahitya Akademi profile, Gupta's work is characterized by "a unique blend of visual artistry and poetic imagination" that creates "multilayered textual landscapes."

=== Works ===
- Nuri Bandor (2015, ISBN 978-93-8073-241-1)
- Akshay Malberi (3 volumes: 1981, 1998, 2004)
- Rong Kankar Ramkinkar (2014)

== Awards and honours ==
- Bishnu Dey Memorial Award (2005)
- Rabindra Puraskar (2010) for Tung Tang Shabdo Nishshabdo
- Sahitya Akademi Award (2011) for Bane Aaj Concerto

== Personal life and death ==
Gupta married poet Debarati Mitra in 1975 after an earlier unsuccessful marriage with district Magistrate Chiru Chowdhury. He died in Kolkata on 31 January 2018 due to Pneumonia.
