= Siddiqur Rahman (Bhola politician) =

Bangladeshi politician (1944–2023)

- সিদ্দিকুর রহমান

Member of Bangladesh Parliament
- In office 15 April 1988 – 6 December 1990
- Preceded by: Tofail Ahmed
- Succeeded by: Mosharraf Hossain Shahjahan
- Constituency: Bhola-2
- In office 2 April 1979 – 24 March 1982
- Preceded by: Yusuf Hossain Humayun
- Succeeded by: Maidul Islam
- Constituency: Barisal-4

Personal details
- Born: 14 December 1944 Bhola, Bengal Province, British India
- Died: 9 June 2023 (aged 78) Dhaka, Bangladesh
- Party: Jatiya Party (Ershad); Bangladesh Nationalist Party

Siddiqur Rahman (14 December 1944 – 9 June 2023) was a Bangladesh Nationalist Party politician and a Jatiya Sangsad member representing the Barisal-4 and Bhola-2 constituencies.

== Career ==
Rahman was elected to parliament from Barisal-4 as a Bangladesh Nationalist Party candidate in 1979. was elected to parliament from Bhola-2 as a Jatiya Party candidate in 1988.
