= The Jai Bangla =

The Jai Bangla was a weekly newspaper published by the Bangladesh Awami League during the Bangladesh Liberation war from Mujibnagar.

== History ==
The Jai Bangla newspaper was started after the start of the Bangladesh Liberation war on 25 March 1971. The first edition was published on 11 May 1971 and had the reciprocation of the independence of Bangladesh. It was published by the Bangladesh Awami League and supported by the Department of Publication, Information, Radio and Cinema of the Provisional Government of Bangladesh. The head of the department, Abdul Mannan, was responsible for the publication of the paper. He was also the chairman of the Board of Editors. The board included Asad Chowdhury, Abul Manzur, Anu Islam, Abdur Razzaque Chowdhury, Abdul Gaffar Chowdhury, Ibn Gholam Samad, and Zillur Rahman.

The Jai Bangla newspaper was supported by Bengali business people in West Bengal. Ananda Bazar Patrika donated newsprint to the Jai Bangla. The offices of the newspaper were located in Kolkata at 21/1 Balu Hakkak Lane of Park Circus. Abdul Mannan used a pseudonym, Ahmad Rafique, as the name of the publisher. From 24 September 1971, the name of the publisher was changed to the Abdul Mannan. The newspaper had 12 pages. The first three issues were sold for 20 paisa while the rest were sold for 25 paisa. The newspaper covered news about the Bangladesh Liberation war, Bangladeshi refugees, and had dedicated columns. The last issue came out n 24 December 1971 after the war ended on 16 December 1971 following the surrender of Pakistan.
