= Mehendiganj =

Town in Barisal District, Barisal Division

Mehendiganj লক্ষ্মীপুর
- Town and Municipality
- Location in Bangladesh
- Coordinates: 22°49′30″N 90°31′30″E
- Country: Bangladesh
- Division: Barisal Division
- District: Barisal District
- Mehendiganj Upazila: Mehendiganj

Government
  - Type: Mayor–Council
  - Body: Mehendiganj Municipal Corporation

Area
  - Total: 17.3 km^{2} (6.7 sq mi)

Population (2011)
  - Total: 33,802
  - Density: 1,950/km^{2} (5,060/sq mi)
- Time zone: UTC+6 (Bangladesh Time)
- National Dialing Code: +880

Mehendiganj is a town in Barisal District in Barisal Division, Bangladesh. It is the administrative headquarters and urban centre of Mehendiganj Upazila.
