= Yusuf Hossain Humayun =

Bangladeshi politician (1936–2026)

- ইউসুফ হোসেন হুমায়ুন
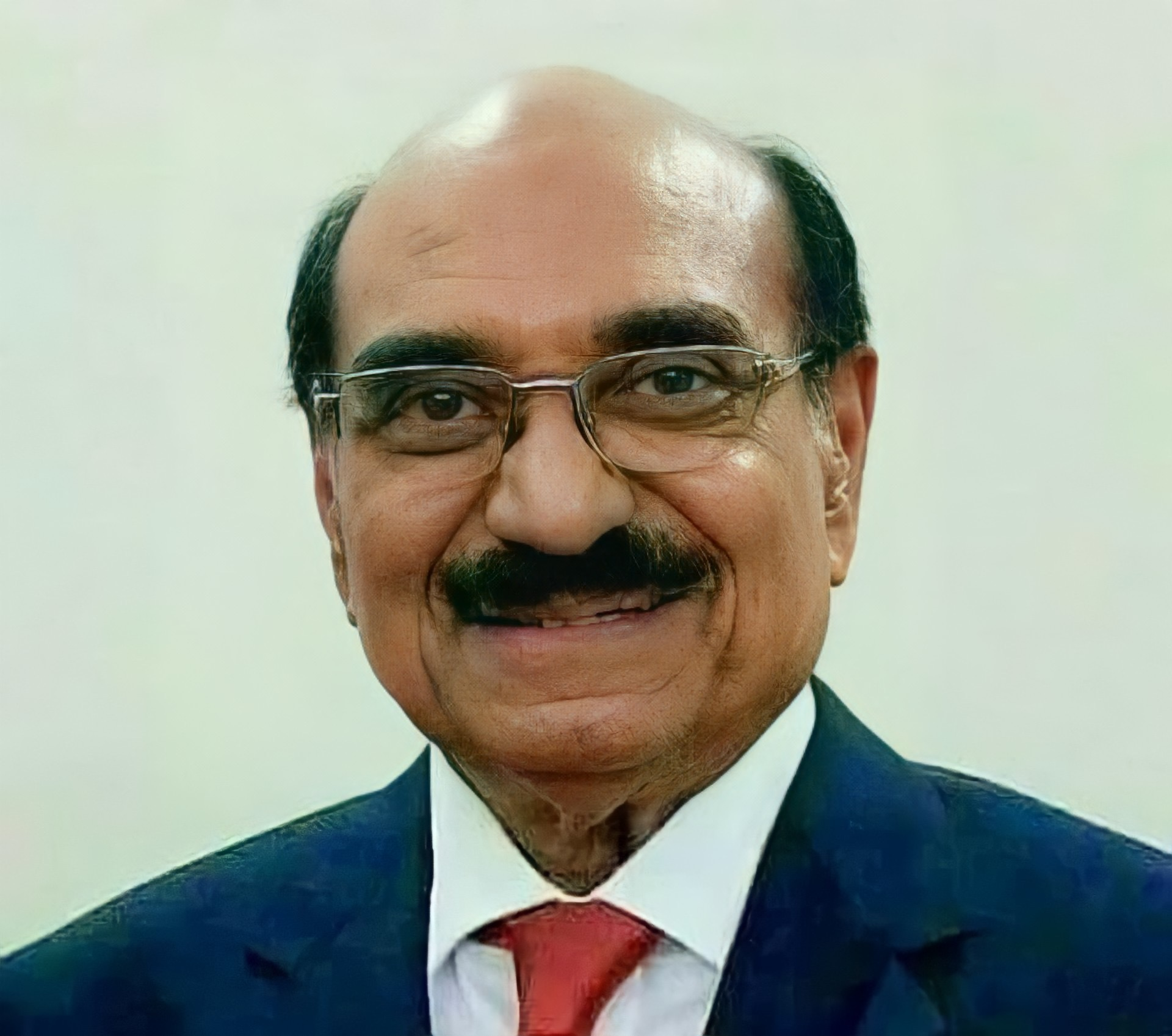

Member of Bangladesh Parliament
- In office 1973–1979
- Succeeded by: Siddiqur Rahman

Personal details
- Born: 14 November 1936 Bhola District, Bengal Presidency, British India
- Died: 23 May 2026 (aged 89) Dhaka, Bangladesh
- Party: Bangladesh Awami League

Yusuf Hossain Humayun (Bengali: ইউসুফ হোসেন হুমায়ুন; 14 November 1936 – 23 May 2026) was a Bangladesh Awami League politician who was a member of parliament for Barisal-4.

== Life and career ==
Humayun was elected to parliament from Bakerganj-4 as a Bangladesh Awami League candidate in 1973. He was president of the Bangladesh Supreme Court Bar Association in the 2016–17 term.

Humayun died in Dhaka on 23 May 2026, at the age of 90.
