= Asad Chowdhury =

Bangladeshi writer (1943–2023)

- আসাদ চৌধুরী
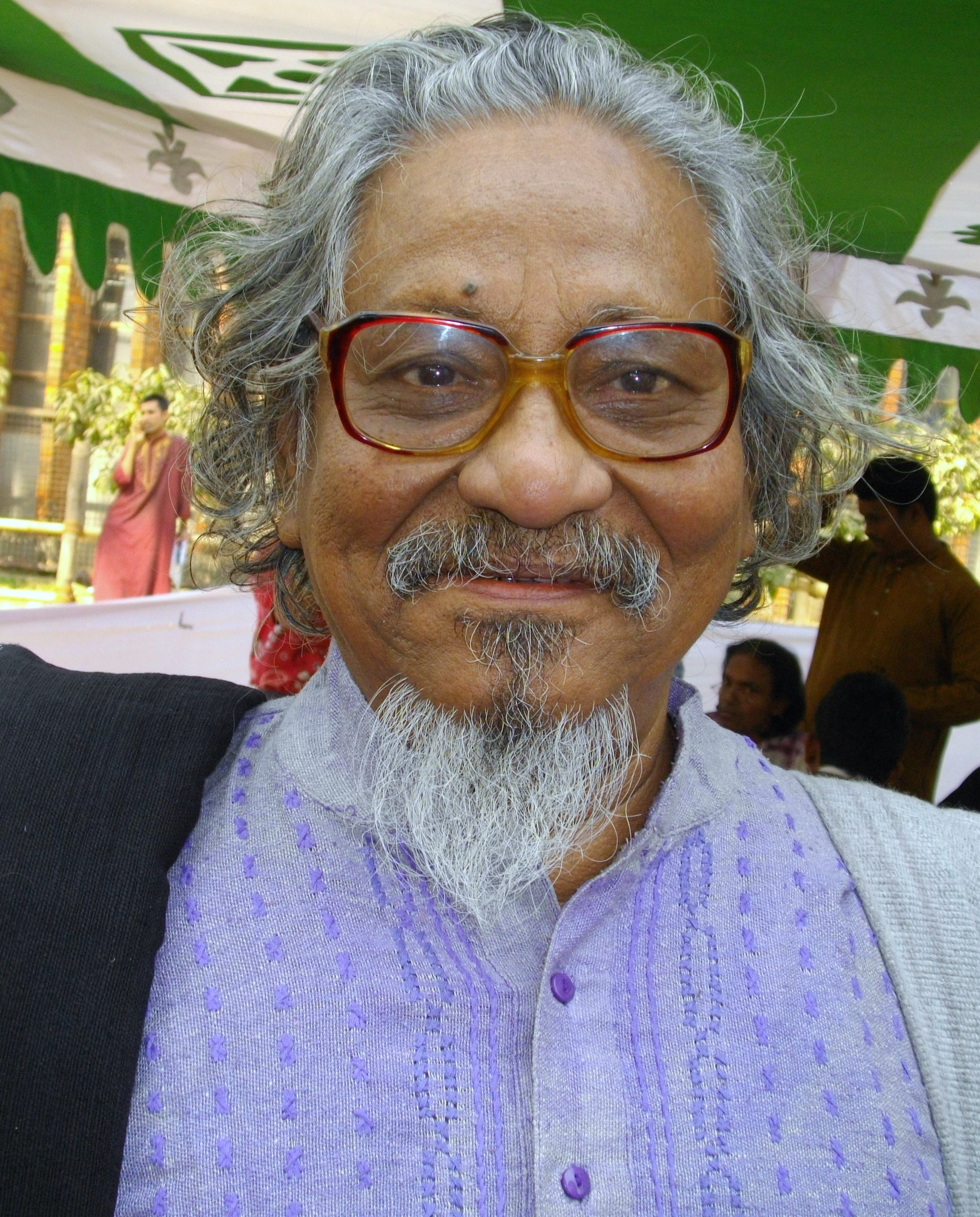
- Chowdhury in 2010
- Born: 11 February 1943; Ulania, Backergunge District, Dhaka Division, Bengal Province, British India
- Died: 5 October 2023 (aged 80); Toronto, Ontario, Canada
- Education: University of Dhaka
- Occupation: Poet
- Relatives: Abdul Gaffar Chowdhury
- Writing career
- Notable awards: Bangla Academy Literary Award 1987; Ekushey Padak 2013

Asad Chowdhury (11 February 1943 – 5 October 2023) was a Bangladeshi poet, writer, translator, radio, television personality, journalist, and cultural activist. He was awarded the Ekushey Padak in 2013 and the Bangla Academy Literary Award in 1987.

== Early life and family ==
Choudhury was born on 11 February 1943 to an aristocratic Bengali Muslim family known as the Zamindar Chowdhury family of Ulania in Mehendiganj, then located under the Backergunge District of the Bengal Province. An ancestor, Sheikh Muhammad Asad Ali, migrated from Persia to Ayodhya, later settling in the Bengali city of Murshidabad. Ali's great great great grandson Muhammad Hanif served as a military commander under Shaista Khan, the Mughal governor of Bengal. He contributed to the suppression of Arakanese and Portuguese pirates in the Bay of Bengal. Hanif then entered the greater Barisal region where he served as the Jamadar of the Sangram Fort in Govindapur and settled in the village of Tetulia, Hizla. The family were later endowed the title of Choudhury, and from his descendants, Muhammad Taqi migrated from the Tetulia Jamadar Bari to the village of Ulania. His son, Hasan Raja, was Asad Chowdhury's great grandfather. Hasan Raja and his two brothers, Naya Raja and Kala Raja, became notable as traders of areca nut, salt and rice, and built strong relationships with the Marwari merchants of Calcutta during the Company Raj. The three brothers established the ports of Lalganj, Aliganj and Kaliganj, and with their amassed wealth, established the zamindari of Idilpur. Raja's son was Majid Chowdhury, whose son was Eslam Chowdhury, whose son Muhammad Arif Chowdhury was Asad Choudhury's father.

== Education and career ==
Chowdhury completed his master's degree in Bengali in 1964 from the University of Dhaka. He started his profession as a lecturer in Bengali language and literature at Brahmanbaria College in 1973. During the liberation war of Bangladesh, he was a contributor and broadcaster of Swadhin Bangla Betar Kendra in Kolkata. He was also an assistant editor in “The Joybangla” (Kolkata, 1971) and in “The Daily Janapada” (Dhaka, February 1973). He was a correspondent for The Daily Purbodesh from 1968 to 1971. He served as the director at the Bangla Academy, Dhaka and worked as an editor at the Bengali service of Deutsche Welle after his retirement.

Chowdhury was a life member of the Asiatic Society of Bangladesh and a fellow of Bangla Academy, Dhaka, as well as being a vice president of The Radio and TV Artists Association. He held many other positions over his life, including:

- Life member of Bigana Samskriti Parshad, Dhaka
- Life member of Bhasha Sammmiti, Dhaka
- Member of the Presidium Jatyo Kabita Utsabe, Dhaka
- Founder, President of Deutsche Banglische Gesellschaft E.V. Bonn, Koln, Germany Ex-Member, R.F.F.U.
- Founder, Vice-President of Chandradeep, Dhaka
- Founder, Vice-President of the Bangladesh Writers Club, Dhaka
- An associated Member of the National Press Club, Dhaka
- Founder President of the Bengali-Urdu Sahitya Foundation

== Death ==
Asad Chowdhury died on 5 October 2023, at the age of 80.

== Publications ==
=== Poems ===
- Tabak Deya Pan, 1975
- Bitto Nai Besat Nai, 1976
- Ekka Dokka, 1980
- Joler Madhye Lekhajokha, 1982
- Je Pare Paruk, 1983
- Modhya Math Theke, 1984
- Megher Julum Pakhir Julum, 1987
- Nadio Bibastro Hoi, 1992
- Premer Kabita, 1992
- Garbo Amar Anek Kichur, 1994
- Tan Bhalobasher Kabita, 1996
- Batash Jemon Parchito, 1998
- Brishtir Sansare Ami Keo Noi 1998
- Kichu Phool Ami Niviye Diechi, 2003
- Prem o Prakritr Kobita, 2003
- Barir Kache Asri Nagar, 2003 (translation of the contemporary Urdu poets)

=== Folk tales ===
- Teen Rasarajer Adda, 1998
- Vin Desher Lok Kahini, 1998
- John Henry, 2001
- Chotother Mojar Golpo, 2001
- Annya Desher Lok-Kahini, 2004

=== Other ===
- Kon Alokar Phool, 1982 (essay)
- Rajanikanta Sen, 1989 (biography)
- Kabita Samagra, 2000
- Maichalengelo, 2001 (biography)

=== Translations ===
Chowdhury's publications have been translated into English, French, German, Hindi, Urdu, and Malayalam and have been published in the US, Canada, UK, France, India, and Pakistan.

== Cassettes ==
- Padavali (1981)
- Moder Garab Moder Asha (1985)
- Sangbarta (1989)
- Premer Kabira (1992)

== Radio and television production ==
Chowdhury conducted Kathakali, a weekly program from 1973 to 1981, and prepared manuscripts for, conducted and participated in many programs of Radio Bangladesh.

== Other activities ==
Chowdhury participated in poetry sessions and recitations arranged by Bangla Academy, German Culture Institute, American Culture Centre, Alliance Francaise, Russian Cultural Centre, Iranian Cultural Centre, Islamic Foundation, as well as other cultural organizations of Bangladesh.

Chowdhury read poems at a festival organised by the Bangladesh Association in Pittsburgh in 2000, and attended Mukti Judha Uthsab in Agartala, India in January 2001.
