= Ajoy Dasgupta =

Ajoy Dasgupta (Bengali: অজয় দাশগুপ্ত; born 9 March 1950) is a freedom fighter for Bangladesh Liberation War. He is a journalist, writer, and lecturer at the University of Dhaka and Jagannath University. Ajoy Dasgupta has been awarded the prestigious Ekushey Padak in 2021 for his contribution to journalism.

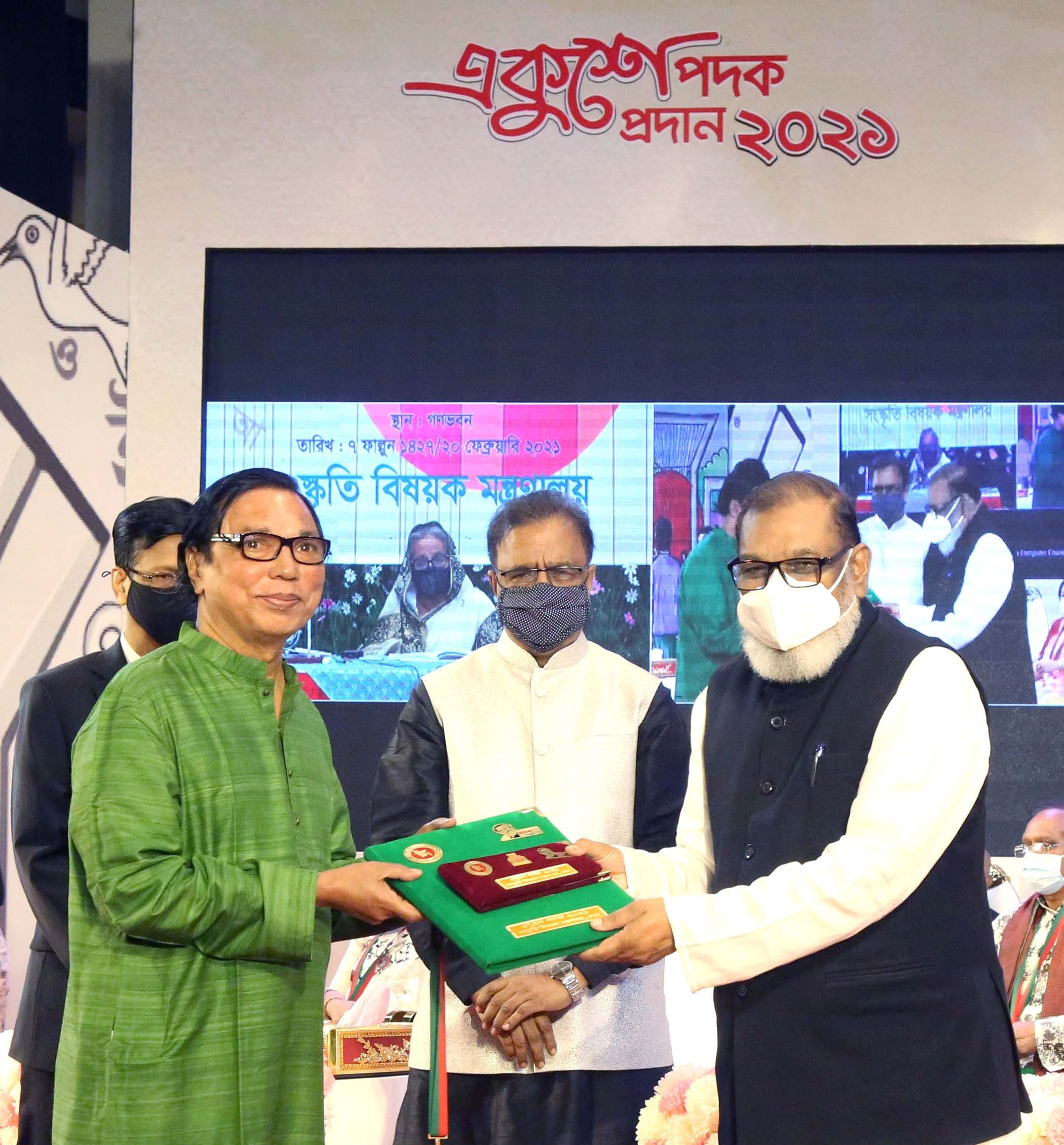
Dasgupta receives Ekushay Padak 2021

== Life and career ==
Dasgupta is a former deputy editor of the daily Samakal. His journalism career spans nearly five decades, beginning at the Jayaddhani (জয়ধ্বনি) newspaper in the early 1970s. He is a member of the Combined Committee for Fair Public Transport.

== Personal life ==
Dasgupta's father, Satya Ranjan Dasgupta, was a veteran of the movement against British colonial rule of India. His family is based in Goila village in Agailjhara Upazila of Barisal District. His mother is Renuka Dasgupta who is affectionately known as Mother of Freedom Fighters (মুক্তিযোদ্ধার মা) for her supporting role during the Bangladesh Liberation War in 1971. Dasgupta's brother, Asim Kumar Dasgupta, is a former executive director of Bangladesh Bank.
