= Md. Razib Ahsan =

Bangladeshi politician

- মো: রাজিব আহসান
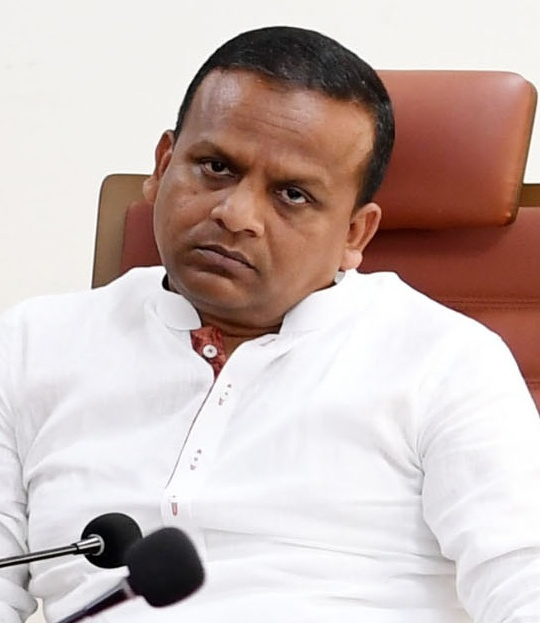
- Ahsan in 2026

Minister of State for Shipping and Bridges
- Incumbent
- Assumed office 17 February 2026
- Prime Minister: Tarique Rahman
- Preceded by: Khalid Mahmud Chowdhury

Member of Parliament
- Incumbent
- Assumed office 17 February 2026
- Preceded by: Pankaj Nath
- Constituency: Barisal-4

Personal details
- Born: 1 January 1978 (age 48) Barisal, Bangladesh
- Party: Bangladesh Nationalist Party

Md. Razib Ahsan (born 1 January 1978) is a Bangladesh Nationalist Party politician and the incumbent Jatiya Sangsad member representing the Barisal-4 constituency and the incumbent Minister of State for Shipping and Bridges Division.
