= Hizla Upazila =

Hizla হিজলা
- Upazila
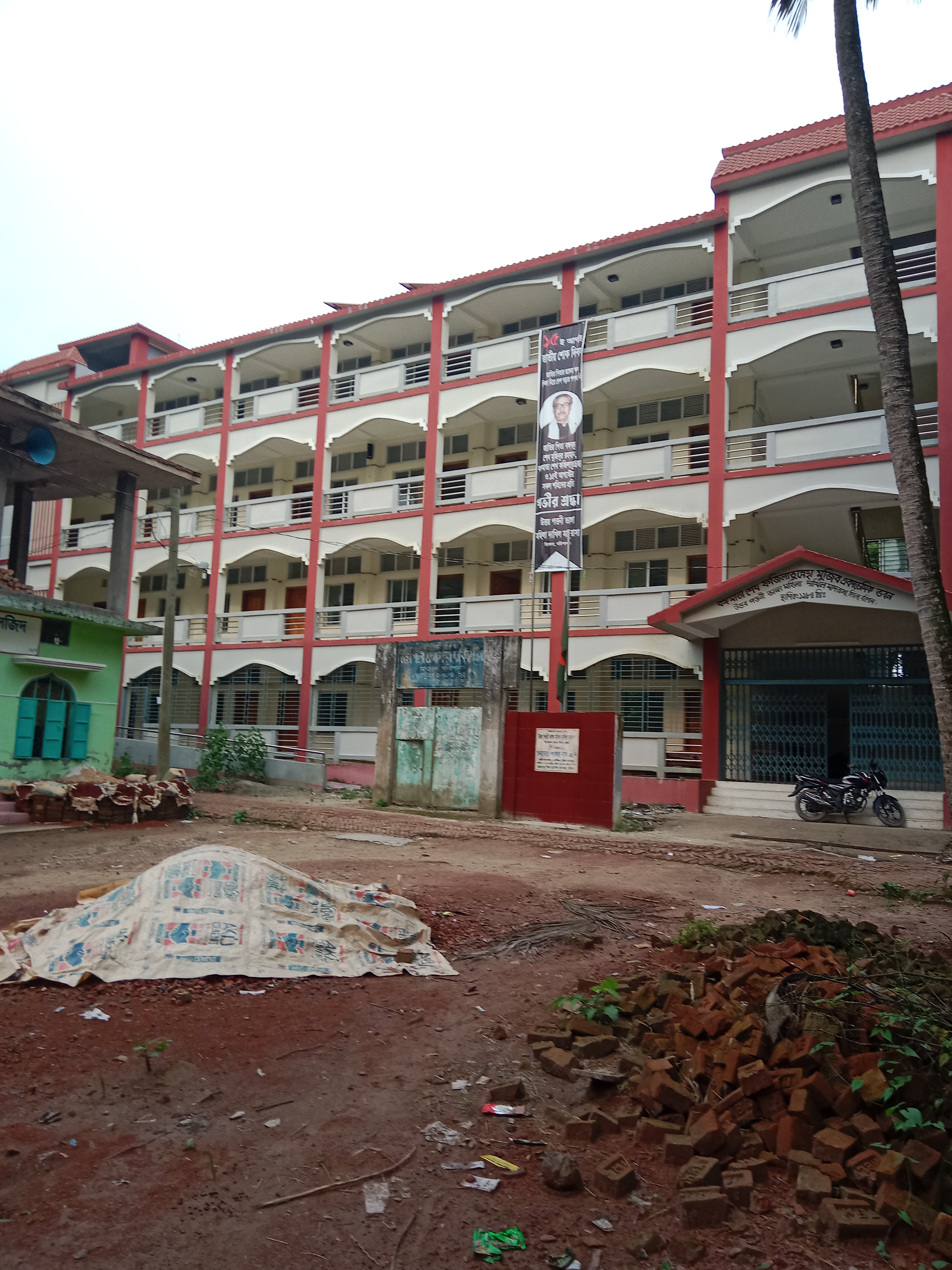
- Uttar Pattani Vanga Mahila Dakhil Madrasah, Hizla

- Coordinates: 22°54′N 90°30.5′E
- Country: Bangladesh
- Division: Barisal
- District: Barisal

Government
  - Upazila Chairman: Md Dipu Sikder
  - MP (Barisal-4): Pankaj Nath

Area
  - Total: 515.36 km^{2} (198.98 sq mi)

Population (2022)
  - Total: 150,669
  - Density: 292.36/km^{2} (757.20/sq mi)
- Time zone: UTC+6 (BST)
- Postal code: 8260
- Area code: 04324
- Website: hizla.barisal.gov.bd

Hizla (Bengali: হিজলা) is the largest upazila (sub-district) of southern Bangladesh's Barisal District.

== Geography ==
Hizla Upazila (barisal district) area 515.36 km^{2}, located in between 22°50' and 23°05' north latitudes and in between 90°25' and 90°43' east longitudes. It is bounded by Gosairhat and Haimchar upazilas on the north, Raipur and Lakshmipur Sadar upazilas to the east, Mehendiganj upazila on the south, Muladi upazila on the west.

Hijla Upazila is located in Kolghes of Shariatpur district of Dhaka Division north of Barishal on the map of the country. Ghosairhat Upazila of Shariatpur district on the north, Haimchar Upazila of Chandpur district on the northeast, Mehendiganj Upazila on the south, Raipur Upazila of Noakhali district on the east, and Muladi Upazila on the west. The distance from the district headquarters is 50 km. It is an area surrounded by rivers.

Jayanti, Nayabhangani, Meghna, Lower Meghna, and Azimpur rivers are flooded.

== History ==
Hizla, along with Mehendiganj, was formerly known as North Shahbazpur. During the Company rule in Bengal, Mawlana Hakim Ahsanullah of Noakhali, a descendant of Shaykh Thakur Chandpuri, was granted a taluk in the village of Gaurabadi in Hizla after treating Prafullanath Tagore, the zamindar of Idilpur and North Shahbazpur. However, Ahsanullah died and the taluk was inherited by his two nephews, Mawlana Abdur Rahim and Dr. Fazlur Rahman. They relocated to Gaurabadi and established the Mia family of Gaurabadi. Their descendant, Moulvi Saadat Husayn Mia, became a leading judge of Barisal, and his son, Hedayet Hossain Morshed, was a journalist and litterateur.

During the Bangladesh Liberation War of 1971, base commanders Bir Protik Qazi Anwar Husayn of Hizla, Qutub Uddin of Muladi and Abdul Quddus Mollah of Mehendiganj led the Bengali freedom fighters in conducting an operation in Hizla, Mehendiganj and Muladi against the Pakistan Army and their collaborators. Many freedom fighters from Hizla were killed in action during the war, including Havildar Shah Alam of Goalbaor (killed in Comilla), Naik Azizur Rahman of Tetulia (killed in Comilla), EPR Havildar Nur Muhammad (killed in Jessore) and Sipahi Abdul Wajid Palpari (killed in Rajshahi). Eight civilians were also killed in Hizla such as Husayn Ali (a teacher from Palpara village), Sultan Jamadar Dadpuri and Ashrab Ali. Shafiqul Manan of Teturia village left his role as Professor of Economics at the Patarhat College to join the war. The Pakistan Army collaborators arrested him in Barisal and murdered him on the banks of the Kirtankhola river. The status of Hizla Thana was upgraded to upazila (sub-district) in 1983 as part of the President of Bangladesh Hussain Muhammad Ershad's decentralisation programme.

== Demographics ==
Religions in Hizla Upazila (2022)
Religion	Percent
Islam	97.53%
Hinduism	2.46%

According to the 2022 Bangladeshi census, Hijla Upazila had 35,042 households and a population of 150,669. 11.71% of the population were under 5 years of age. Hijla had a literacy rate (age 7 and over) of 69.83%: 68.15% for males and 71.48% for females, and a sex ratio of 98.90 males for every 100 females. 27,551 (18.29%) lived in urban areas.

According to the 2011 Census of Bangladesh, Hizla Upazila had 30,529 households and a population of 146,077. 41,375 (28.32%) were under 10 years of age. Hizla had a literacy rate (age 7 and over) of 40.83%, compared to the national average of 51.8%, and a sex ratio of 1007 females per 1000 males. 14,184 (9.71%) lived in urban areas.

== Administration ==
UNO: Md. Jahangir Hossen.

Hizla Upazila is divided into seven union parishads: Bara Jalia, Dhulkhola, Guabaria, Harinathpur, Hizla Gaurabdi, Kuchaipatti, and Memania. The union parishads are subdivided into 139 mauzas and 112 villages.

=== Chairmen ===
List of chairmen
Name	Term
Amjad Husayn	1985-1986
ATM Mahbub Alam	1986-1991
Sultan Mahmud Tipu	2009-2014
Muhammad Belayet Husayn Dhali	Present

== Notable people ==
- AKM Nurul Karim Khair, wartime parliamentarian

== See also ==
- Upazilas of Bangladesh
- Districts of Bangladesh
- Divisions of Bangladesh
