= Shah M. Abul Hussain =

Bangladeshi politician (1937–2022)

- শাহ এম আবুল হোসেন

State Minister of Finance
- In office 10 October 2001 – 29 October 2006
- Preceded by: Shah A M S Kibria
- Succeeded by: Abul Maal Abdul Muhith

Member of Parliament for Barisal-4
- In office 23 June 1996 – 29 October 2006
- Preceded by: Mohiuddin Ahmed
- Succeeded by: Md. Mazbauddin Farhad

Personal details
- Born: 1 April 1937 Barisal, Bengal Province, British India
- Died: 21 November 2022 (aged 85) Evercare Hospital, Dhaka, Bangladesh
- Party: Bangladesh Nationalist Party
- Spouse: Shahana Hussain
- Occupation: Politician, civil servant

Shah Muhammad Abul Hussain (1 April 1937 – 21 November 2022) was a Bangladesh Nationalist Party politician and a former Member of Parliament from the Mehendiganj Upazila, Barisal-4.

== Career ==
Abul Hussain worked as a collector in the Bangladesh Customs. He was elected into the Bangladesh parliament in the June 1996 Bangladeshi general election. He was re-elected into parliament in the elections in 2001. He served as the State Minister of Finance and Planning in the Third Khaleda Cabinet.

== Death ==
Abul Hussain died in Dhaka on 21 November 2022, at the age of 85.

== See also ==
- Bangladesh Nationalist Party
