= Ghatak Pakhi Bhai =

Bangladeshi matchmaker

- ঘটক পাখি ভাই
- Born: Kazi Ashraf Hossain; 1943 (age 82–83); Backergunge District, Bengal Province, British India
- Occupation: Marriage broker
- Years active: 1967–present
- Spouse: 2
- Children: 7
- Website: ghotokpakhivaibd.com

Ghatak Pakhi Bhai (born 1943) is a Bangladeshi matchmaker and spiritual teacher who have a matrimonial agency in the country. Through him the profession of matchmaking became popular in Bangladesh and he maintained a monopoly in this business for thirty decades in the country.

== Early life ==
Ghatak Pakhi Bhai was born in 1943 in Backergunge District (now Barisal District, Bangladesh). He dropped out one year before his matriculation examination and couldn’t continue his education. In the 60s, he joined the Khulna Newsprint Mills Limited. In 1967, he succeeded in matching a colleague there, which was his first job. Since then he started matchmaking. In 1971 he became physically ill and had to undergo an operation in Barisal Medical College. In 1973 he was diagnosed with an ulcer during the operation and was declared unfit, leaving him jobless.

== Career ==
After 1973 he moved from Barisal to Dhaka. Taking shelter in a boat at the Port of Dhaka, he started offering matchmaking services for money. Then he started to be known among everyone due to his work. As his work required him to move quickly from one place to another, people started comparing him to a bird and started calling him "Ghatak Pakhi Bhai" (lit. 'Brother Matchmaker Bird'). After gaining recognition, he started conducting his activities from hotel rooms. On someone's advice, he placed an advertisement in The Daily Ittefaq in 1983. Then he moved out of hotel and started working in a rented house. In 1985, he rented an office for his work in the Eastern Plaza shopping complex, which is now the address of his matchmaking agency.

Around 2005 he started using internet and information technology for his matrimony agency which further expanded his business. On 28 October 2019, the National Board of Revenue sent letters to the banks asking for bank account details of Ghatak Pakhi Bhai. Although earlier his matchmaking business was doing well but around 2019 his income has decreased due to people turning away from matchmakers due to which he is struggling to pay his staff. Era of digitalisation was another cause behind the downturn of his business. According to the 2021 report, Ghatak Pakhi Bhai has succeeded in arranging at least 18,000 marriages in his matchmaking career. In 2023, the number increased by another 5,000.

== Personal life ==
He got married for the first time in 1960 in an arranged marriage. He and his wife have four sons and two daughters. As his first wife was ill, he later married a widow who came to his matrimonial agency to find a husband. He and his second wife have a daughter.

== In the media and legacy ==
- Al Jazeera published a news report on Ghatak Pakhi Bhai, referring to him as "Bangladesh's love guru". Agence France-Presse referred him as "Bangladesh's national cupid".
- A drama serial, titled after him, has been directed by Debashish Barua.
