= Md. Mazbauddin Farhad =

Bangladeshi politician

Md. Mejba uddin Farhad
- মোঃ মেজবা উদ্দীন ফরহাদ

Member of Parliament for Barisal-4
- In office 25 January 2009 – 24 January 2014
- Preceded by: Shah M. Abul Hussain
- Succeeded by: Pankaj Nath

Personal details
- Born: 25 August 1963 (age 61)
- Political party: Bangladesh Nationalist Party

Md. Mejbauddin Farhad (born 25 August 1963) is a Bangladesh Nationalist Party politician and a former Jatiya Sangsad member representing the Barisal-4 constituency during 2009–2014.

== Career ==
Farhad was elected to parliament from Barisal-4 as a Bangladesh Nationalist Party candidate in 2008.
