= Barisal-4 =

Constituency of Bangladesh's Jatiya Sangsad

Coordinates: 22.83°N 90.53°E

- Constituency for the Jatiya Sangsad
- District: Barisal District
- Division: Barisal Division
- Electorate: 421,975 (2026)

Current constituency
- Created: 1973
- Parliamentary Party: Bangladesh Nationalist Party
- Member of Parliament: Md. Razib Ahsan
- ← 121 Barisal-3 123 Barisal-5 →

Barisal-4 is a constituency represented in the Jatiya Sangsad (National Parliament) of Bangladesh. Md. Razib Ahsan is the current MP.

== Boundaries ==
The constituency encompasses Hizla and Mehendiganj upazilas.

== History ==
The constituency was created for the first general elections in newly independent Bangladesh, held in 1973.

Ahead of the 2008 general election, the Election Commission redrew constituency boundaries to reflect population changes revealed by the 2001 Bangladesh census. The 2008 redistricting altered the boundaries of the constituency.

== Members of Parliament ==
| Election | Member | Party |
|---|---|---|
| 1973 | Mohiuddin Ahmed | Bangladesh Awami League |
| 1979 | Siddiqur Rahman | Bangladesh Nationalist Party |
| 1986 | Maidul Islam | Jatiya Party (Ershad) |
| 1991 | Mohiuddin Ahmed | Bangladesh Awami League |
| 1996 | Shah M. Abul Hussain | Bangladesh Nationalist Party |
| 2001 | Shah M. Abul Hussain | Bangladesh Nationalist Party |
| 2008 | Md. Mazbauddin Farhad | Bangladesh Nationalist Party |
| 2014 | Pankaj Nath | Bangladesh Awami League |
| 2018 | Pankaj Nath | Bangladesh Awami League |
| 2024 | Pankaj Nath | Independent |
| 2026 | Md. Razib Ahsan | Bangladesh Nationalist Party |

== Elections ==
=== Elections in the 2020s ===
General election 2026: Barisal-4
| Party | Candidate | Votes | % | ±% |
|---|---|---|---|---|
| BNP | Md. Razib Ahsan | 128,322 | 53.12 | +53.12 |
| Jamaat | Mohammad Abdul Jabbar | 74,684 | 30.91 | +7.71 |
| Majority | | 53,638 | 22.20 | −68.90 |
| Turnout | | 241,571 | 57.25 | −10.65 |
| Registered electors | | 421,975 | | |
| BNP gain from Independent | | | | |

=== Elections in the 2010s ===
General Election 2014: Barisal-4
| Party | Candidate | Votes | % | ±% |
|---|---|---|---|---|
| AL | Pankaj Nath | 175,413 | 94.2 | +50.0 |
| BNF | Anjuman Salah Uddin | 5,629 | 3.0 | N/A |
| JP(E) | Sheikh Md. Joynal Abedin | 5,265 | 2.8 | N/A |
| Majority | | 169,784 | 91.1 | +88.9 |
| Turnout | | 186,307 | 67.9 | −16.8 |
| AL gain from BNP | | | | |

=== Elections in the 2000s ===
General Election 2008: Barisal-4
| Party | Candidate | Votes | % | ±% |
|---|---|---|---|---|
| BNP | Md. Mazbauddin Farhad | 92,856 | 46.4 | −20.4 |
| AL | Maidul Islam | 88,483 | 44.2 | +21.1 |
| IAB | Sayed Md. Mosaddeq Billah | 18,455 | 9.2 | N/A |
| Gano Forum | M. Fazlul Hoque | 218 | 0.1 | N/A |
| Independent | Shah M. Abul Hussain | 157 | 0.1 | N/A |
| KSJL | Md. Abdus Sattar Sikder | 106 | 0.1 | N/A |
| Majority | | 4,373 | 2.2 | −41.5 |
| Turnout | | 200,275 | 84.8 | +32.2 |
| BNP hold | | | | |

General Election 2001: Barisal-4
| Party | Candidate | Votes | % | ±% |
|---|---|---|---|---|
| BNP | Shah M. Abul Hussain | 65,091 | 66.8 | +12.7 |
| AL | Md. Mahsin Shikder | 22,502 | 23.1 | −0.9 |
| Jatiya Party (M) | Anisur Rahman Chowdhury | 5,295 | 5.4 | N/A |
| IJOF | Gazi Md. Abul Based | 4,158 | 4.3 | N/A |
| Independent | Md. Awolad Hossain | 333 | 0.3 | N/A |
| Majority | | 42,589 | 43.7 | +13.6 |
| Turnout | | 97,379 | 52.6 | −19.7 |
| BNP hold | | | | |

=== Elections in the 1990s ===
General Election June 1996: Barisal-4
| Party | Candidate | Votes | % | ±% |
|---|---|---|---|---|
| BNP | Shah M. Abul Hussain | 50,830 | 54.1 | +38.3 |
| AL | Mohiuddin Ahmed | 22,556 | 24.0 | +0.9 |
| JP(E) | A. Zabber Talukdar | 10,414 | 11.1 | −2.6 |
| Jamaat | Mahmud Al Mamun | 9,577 | 10.2 | −13.0 |
| Zaker Party | M. A. Razzak | 506 | 0.5 | −0.6 |
| NDP | H. M. Ruhul Amin | 69 | 0.1 | N/A |
| Majority | | 28,274 | 30.1 | −14.1 |
| Turnout | | 93,952 | 72.3 | +34.6 |
| BNP gain from AL | | | | |

General Election 1991: Barisal-4
| Party | Candidate | Votes | % | ±% |
|---|---|---|---|---|
| AL | Mohiuddin Ahmed | 22,093 | 30.2 | |
| Jamaat | Md. Mahmud Hossain Al Mamun | 16,943 | 23.2 | |
| BNP | Khandakar Mazharul Islam | 11,576 | 15.8 | |
| JP(E) | Maidul Islam | 9,995 | 13.7 | |
| BAKSAL | Md. Shahjahan Khan | 8,783 | 12.0 | |
| Jatiya Jukta Front | Mostafa Hamid Chowdhury | 1,270 | 1.7 | |
| Bangladesh Janata Party | A. S. M. Shahidul Islam | 836 | 1.1 | |
| Zaker Party | A. Razzak Dhali | 795 | 1.1 | |
| Jatiya Biplobi Front | Abdur Rahman Khan | 644 | 0.9 | |
| JSD (S) | Abdul Zalil | 169 | 0.2 | |
| Majority | | 32,322 | 44.2 | |
| Turnout | | 73,104 | 37.7 | |
| AL gain from JP(E) | | | | |
