= Shammi Ahmed =

Bangladeshi politician

Member of the Bangladesh Parliament for Reserved women's seat-17
- In office 28 February 2024 – 6 August 2024
- Preceded by: Nadira Yeasmin Jolly

Personal details
- Born: 12 January 1966 (age 60)
- Party: Awami League
- Parent: Mohiuddin Ahmed (father)

Shammi Ahmed (born 12 January 1966) is a Bangladesh Awami League politician and a former Jatiya Sangsad member from a women's reserved seat in 12th Parliament election. She served as International Affairs Secretary of Bangladesh Awami League.

== Family ==
Shammi is the daughter of late Awami League leader, Mohiuddin Ahmed (d. 2002). Mohiuddin Ahmed began his career as an activist and party worker of the East Pakistan Muslim League. In the 1970 East Pakistan Provincial Assembly election he was elected as an MPA from Bakerganj-10 as an All-Pakistan Awami League candidate.

Mohiuddin Ahmed was elected to the Jatiya Sangsad from Bakerganj-10 as an Awami League candidate in 1973.

He was elected a member of parliament from the Barisal-4 constituency as a Bangladesh Awami League candidate in the 1991 Bangladeshi general election.[2] He lost the 1996 election to Shah M. Abul Hussain of the BNP, after which he retired from politics.

== Career ==
Shammi was given the nomination to contest the 2024 Bangladeshi general election from the Awami League instead of Pankaj Debnath (former president of the Swechasebak League and ex-MP from Barisal-4). However, Shammi's nomination was cancelled by the election commission due to her having Australian citizenship. She was later made an MP from Awami League's reserved seat for women. She remained an MP until the fall of Sheikh Hasina's government. Shammi has been in hiding since August 5, 2024.

In July 2025, Bangladesh Police arrested activists of Students Against Discrimination after they tried to extort 5 million BDT from Shammi and her family. In response to the incident, the Students Against Discrimination suspended all committees of the organization except for the central one.
