= Ulania =

Ulania উলানিয়া
- Village
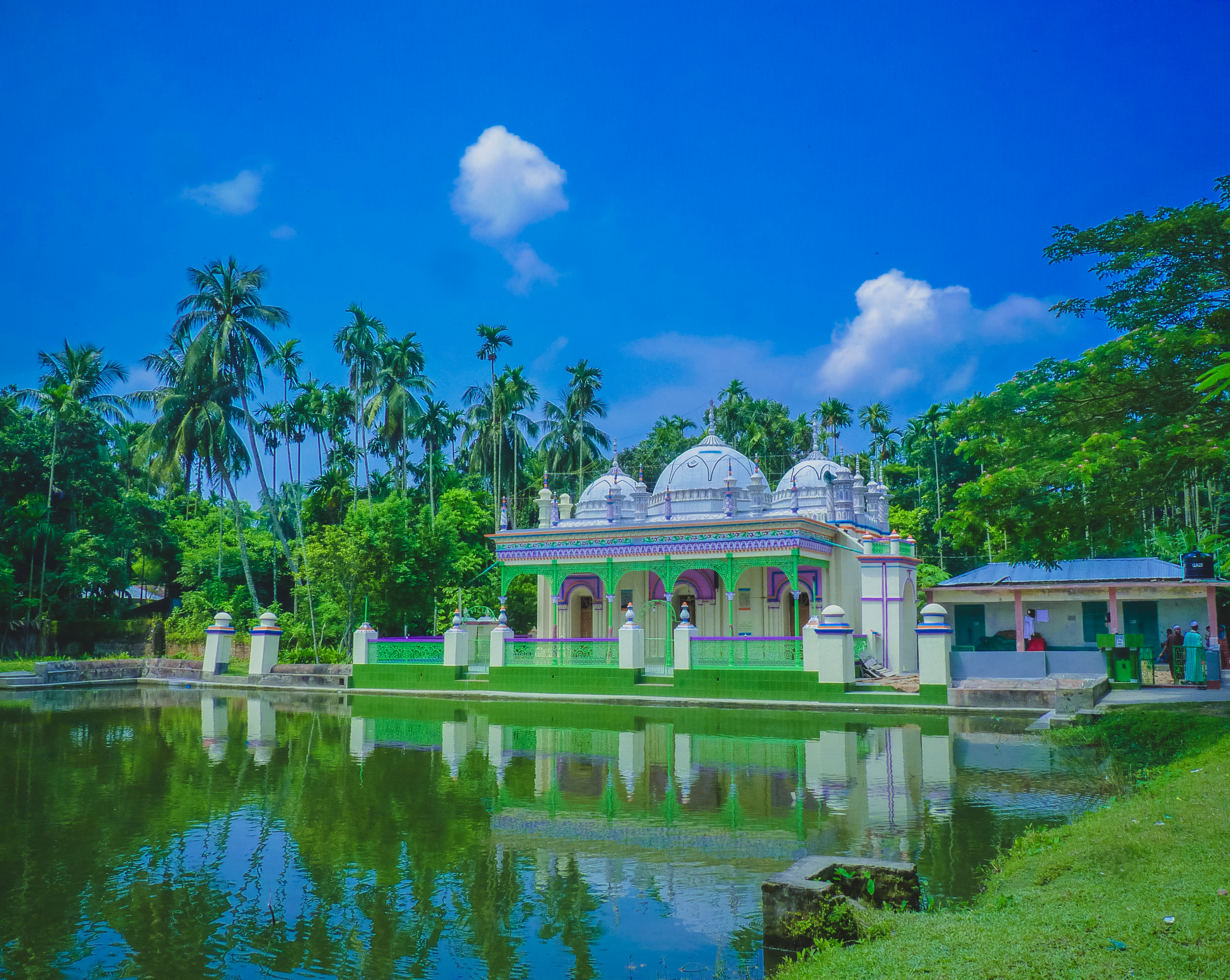
- Mosque in Ulania Zamindar Bari

- Location in Bangladesh
- Coordinates: 22°51′N 90°36′E
- Country: Bangladesh
- Division: Barisal Division
- District: Barisal District
- Upazila: Mehendiganj Upazila

Area
  - Total: 0.79 km^{2} (0.31 sq mi)

Population (2022)
  - Total: 3,088
  - Density: 3,900/km^{2} (10,000/sq mi)
- Time zone: UTC+6 (Bangladesh Time)

Ulania is a village in Mehendiganj Upazila of Barisal District in the Barisal Division of southern-central Bangladesh.

According to the 2022 Census of Bangladesh, Ulania had 750 households and a population of 3,088. It has a total area of 0.79 km^{2} (0.31 sq mi).
