= Poet Vijay Gupta's Mansa Devi Temple =

Hindu temple in Bangladesh

Coordinates: 22°58′14″N 90°10′41″E

- কবি বিজয় গুপ্তের প্রতিষ্ঠিত শ্রী শ্রী মা মনসা মন্দির
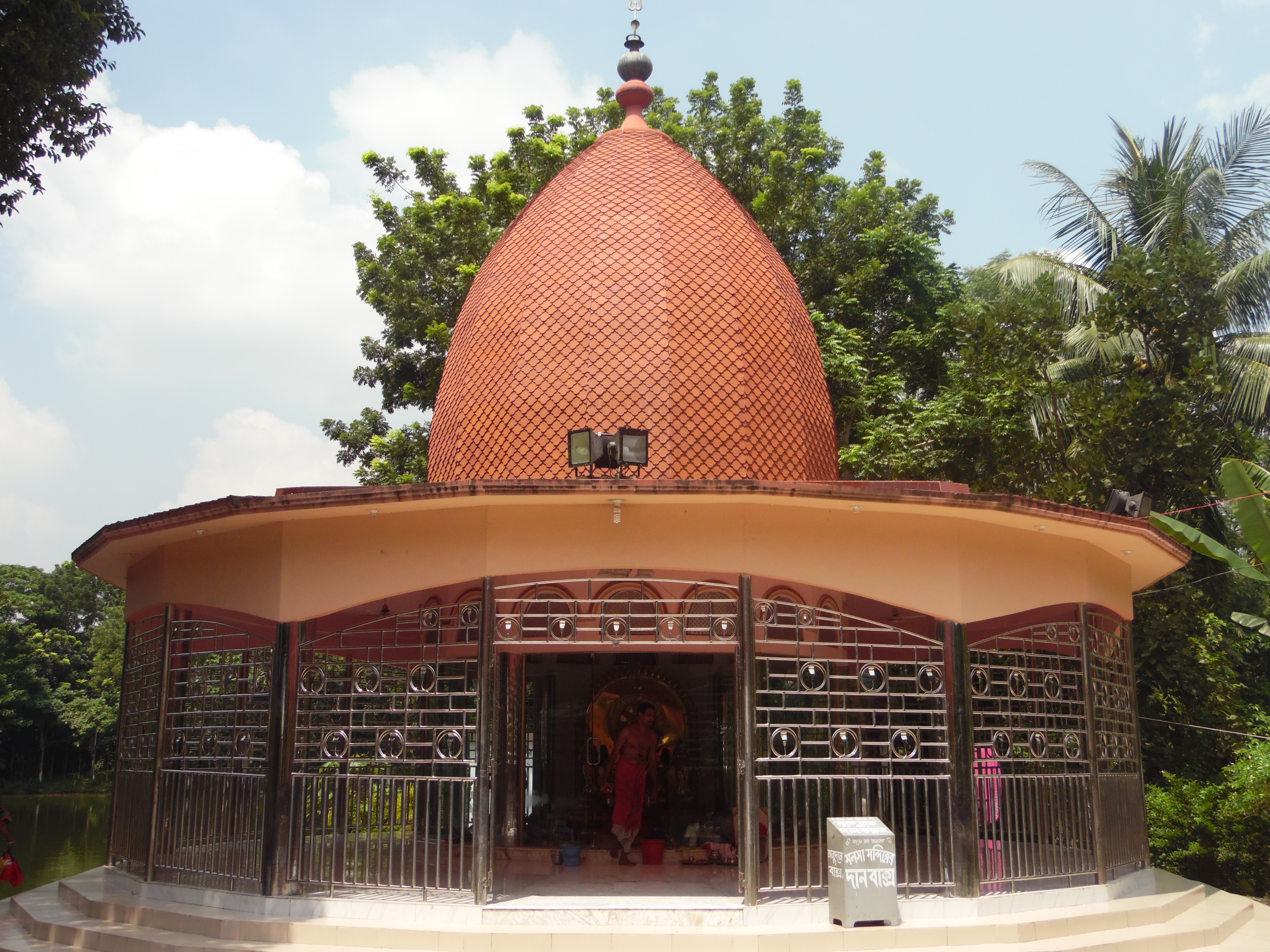

Religion
- Affiliation: Hinduism
- District: Barisal
- Deity: Mansa Devi (Shakti)
- Festival: Manasa Puja
- Governing body: Poet Vijay Gupta Smriti Raksha Mansa Temple Conservation and Development Committee

Location
- Location: Goila, Agailjhara Upazila
- Country: Bangladesh
- Interactive map of Poet Vijay Gupta's Mansa Devi Temple

Architecture
- Type: Hindu temple architecture
- Creator: Vijay Gupta
- Completed: 1494 AD

Poet Vijay Gupta's Manasa Devi Temple, located in Agailjhara Upazila, Barishal District, is a historic Hindu temple in Bangladesh dedicated to the goddess Mansa Devi, also known as Bishahari Devi. Established in 1494 CE by the renowned medieval Bengali poet Vijay Gupta, the temple is a place of worship and a significant cultural and literary site. The temple is recognized for its annual worship ceremonies and the three-day Rayani song festival, which are deeply rooted in the Manasamangal Kāvya, a classic of medieval Bengali literature.
