= Abdul Gaffar Chowdhury =

Bangladeshi-born British songwriter (1934–2022)

- আবদুল গাফফার চৌধুরী
- Born: 12 December 1934; Ulania, Mehendiganj, Bengal Presidency, British Raj
- Died: 19 May 2022 (aged 87); London, England
- Citizenship: British citizenship
- Education: University of Dhaka
- Occupations: Writer, journalist, columnist, political analyst, poet
- Political party: Awami League
- Spouse: Selima Afroz Chowdhury (m. 1956; died 2012)
- Children: 5
- Parents: Wahed Reza Chowdhury (father); Zohra Khatun Chowdhury (mother)
- Relatives: Asad Chowdhury
- Awards: Full list

Abdul Gaffar Chowdhury (12 December 1934 – 19 May 2022) was a Bangladeshi-born British writer, journalist, columnist, political analyst and poet. He wrote the lyrics to "Amar Bhaier Rokte Rangano", a widely celebrated song commemorating the Bengali language movement. He was awarded the Bangla Academy Literary Award in 1967, the Ekushey Padak in 1983, and the Independence Day Award in 2009.

== Early life and family ==
Abdul Gaffar Chowdhury was born on 12 December 1934 to an aristocratic Bengali Muslim Chowdhury family known as the Zamindar family of Ulania in Mehendiganj, then located under the Backergunge District of the Bengal Province (now Bangladesh). His ancestor, Sheikh Muhammad Asad Ali, migrated from Persia to Ayodhya, later settling in the Bengali city of Murshidabad. Ali's great-great-great-grandson Muhammad Hanif served as a military commander under Shaista Khan, the Mughal governor of Bengal. He was noted to have contributed to the suppression of Arakanese and Portuguese pirates in the Bay of Bengal. Hanif then entered the greater Barisal region, where he served as the Jamadar of the Sangram Fort in Govindapur and settled in the village of Tetulia, Hizla. The family was later endowed the title of Choudhury, and from his descendants, Muhammad Taqi migrated from the Tetulia Jamadar Bari to the village of Ulania. His son, Naya Raja, was Abdul Gaffar Chowdhury's great-grandfather. Naya Raja and his two brothers, Hasan Raja and Kala Raja, became notable as traders of areca nut, salt and rice, and built strong relationships with the Marwari merchants of Calcutta during the Company Raj. The three brothers established the ports of Lalganj, Aliganj and Kaliganj, and with their amassed wealth, established the zamindari of Idilpur.

Chowdhury's father, Wahed Reza Chowdhury, son of Fazel Ali, was a landlord and freedom fighter. He was the president of Congress's Bakarganj branch and a member of the All-India Congress Working Committee. Wahed served as a secretary to Motilal Nehru and was imprisoned in the 1942 August Movement. Choudhury's mother was Zohra Khatun. Choudhury had three brothers, Ali Reza Choudhury (Mehdi) was his younger brother, and Hossain Reja Choudhury was his elder. His sisters were Manik Bibi Choudhury, Laili Khatun Choudhury, Saleha Khatun Choudhury, Masuma Begum Choudhury and Fazilatun Nesa Choudhury.

== Education ==
Chowdhury graduated from the University of Dhaka in 1959 and came to England on 5 October 1974.

== Career ==
Before moving to the United Kingdom, Chowdhury worked as a journalist for different national newspapers in Dhaka. During the 1971 Bangladeshi Liberation War, he worked for Joy Bangla, Jugantar and Anandabazar Patrika. He also worked with Khaled Belal in the "Awaz" patrika.

He is perhaps best known for writing the lyrics to "Amar Bhaier Rokte Rangano" which is recognised as the most influential song of Bengali language movement and was initially set to music by him. Later, however, Altaf Mahmud's composed music and adapted the song. It has been regarded by listeners of BBC Bengali Service as the third best song in Bengali.

In the UK, Chowdhury founded the newspaper Notun Din. He had written 35 five books. He lived in London from where he regularly wrote columns in national Bangladeshi dailies, in Bengali newspapers of the Bangladeshi community and in a daily paper in Kolkata.

Some of his notable works are "Dan Pithe Shawkat", "Chandrodwiper Upakhyan", "Nam Na Jana Bhore", "Nil Jamuna", "Shesh Rajanir Chand", "Polashi Thekey Dhanmondi", "Bastobotar Nirikhey" and others.

Chowdhury had produced a film on the assassination of Sheikh Mujibur Rahman called Polashi theke Dhanmondi. It was reported in 2008, that he was due to produce the film The Poet of Politics about the life of Sheikh Mujibur Rahman.

== Awards ==
- Bangla Academy Literary Award (1967)
- Ekushey Padak
- UNESCO literary Award
- Bangabandhu Award
- Shanghati Lifetime Achievement Award (2008)
- Sadhinota Padak (2009)
- Manik Miah Padak by The Daily Ittefaq (2009).
- PIB-Sohel Samad Memorial Award (2014).

Choudhury was a freeman of the London Borough of Tower Hamlets.

== Personal life ==
Choudhury was married to Selima Choudhury (d. 2012). Their son, Anupam, works for Reuters, and their four daughters were Tanima, Chinmoyee, Binita and Indira.

Choudhury came to the United Kingdom for the treatment of his wife and could not return to Bangladesh for 22 years after the assassination of Sheikh Mujibur Rahman.

== Death ==
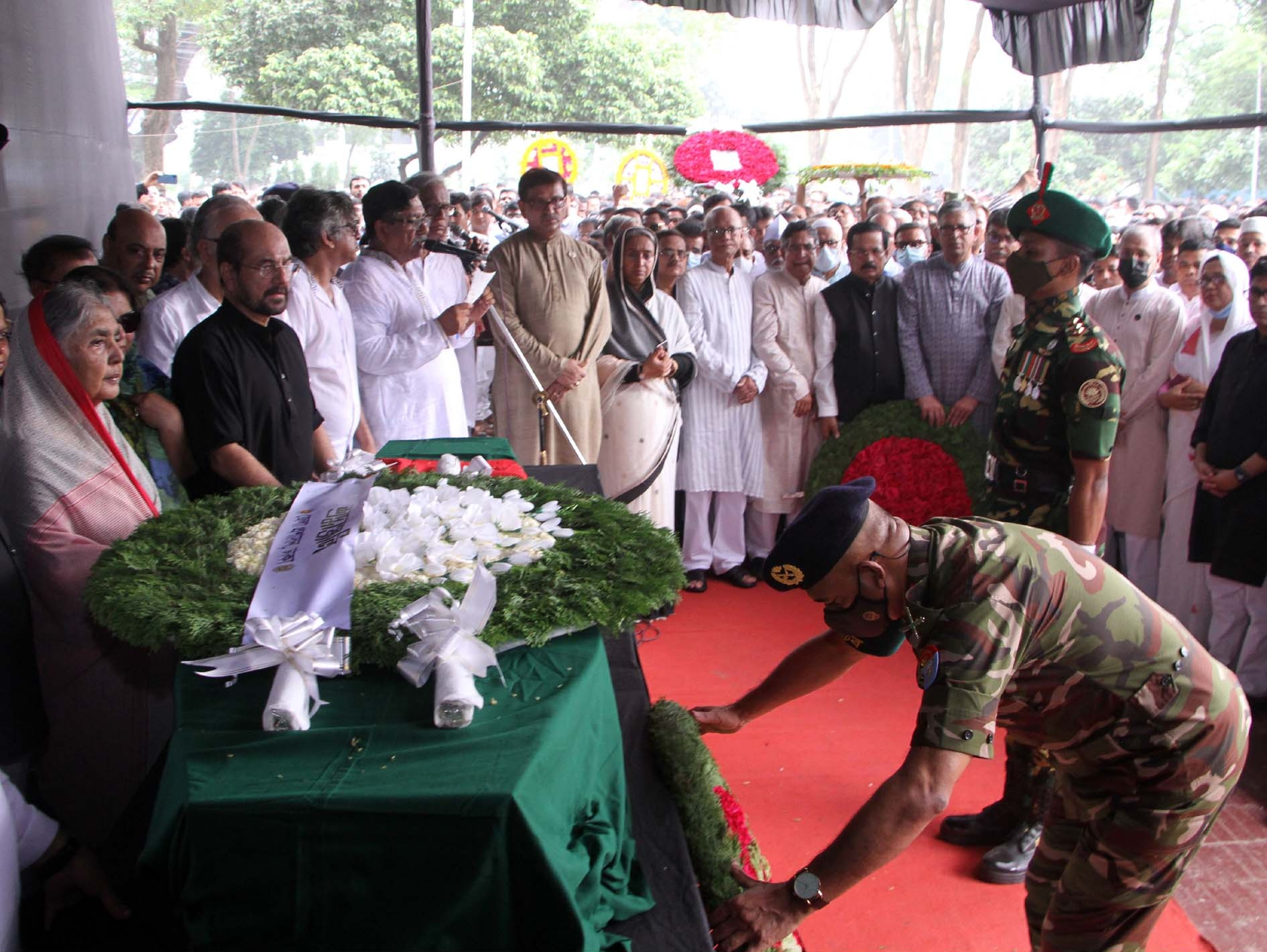
Choudhury at Central Shaheed Minar in Dhaka

Choudhury died on 19 May 2022 at the age of 87 of a cardiac arrest at a hospital in London. On 22 May, a dua mahfil was organised in his honour at the Brick Lane Mosque and attended by former home ninister Shamsul Hoque Tuku.

== Works ==
Year	Title
1958	Dan Pithe Shawkat (Sawkat, The Daring Kid)
1960	Chandrodwiper Upakhyan (The Tale of Chandradwip)
1962	Nam Na Jana Bhore (The Nameless Dawn)
1964	Nil Jamuna (The Blue Jamuna)
1967	Shesh Ratrir Chand (The Late Night Moon)
