= Mehendiganj Upazila =

Mehendigonj মেহেন্দিগঞ্জ
- Upazila
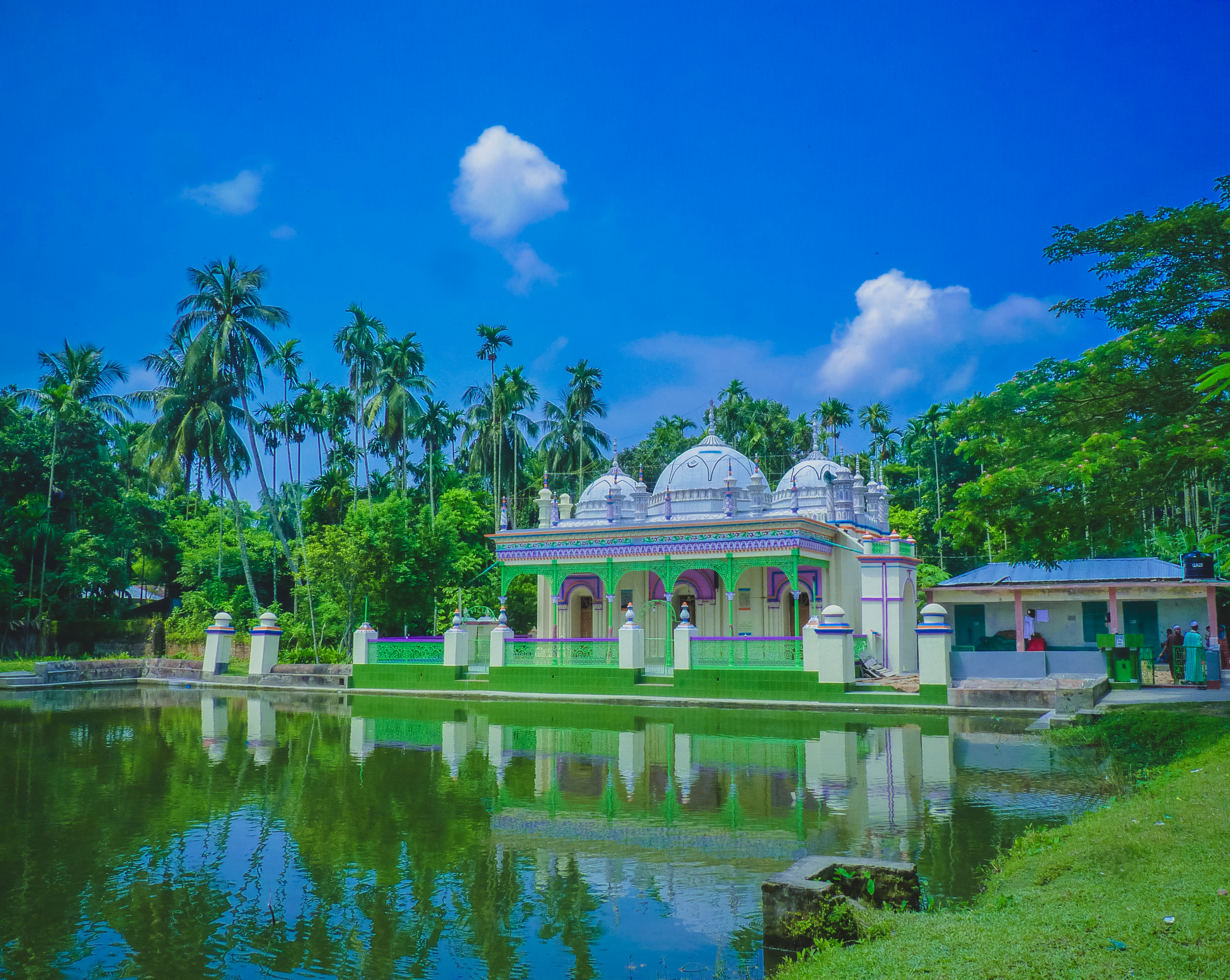
- Ulania Zamindar Bari Mosque

- Coordinates: 22°49.9′N 90°32′E
- Country: Bangladesh
- Division: Barisal
- District: Barisal
- Headquarters: Mehendiganj

Government
  - MP: Pankaj Nath

Area
  - Total: 435.79 km^{2} (168.26 sq mi)

Population (2022)
  - Total: 283,890
  - Density: 651.44/km^{2} (1,687.2/sq mi)
- Time zone: UTC+6 (BST)
- Postal code: 8270
- Area code: 04325
- Website: mehendiganj.barisal.gov.bd

Mehendigonj (Bengali: মেহেন্দিগঞ্জ) is an upazila of Barisal District in Barisal Division, Bangladesh. Mehendigonj is popularly known as Patarhat (Bengali: পাতারহাট) by locals.

== Geography ==
Mehendigonj is located at 22.8319°N 90.5333°E. It has a total area of 435.79 km^{2}. The river Meghna is surrounded by this small island causing erosion every year during the monsoon season. The popular towns such as Ulania, Kaliganj in the east are in serious danger. About 9,480 people composing 1,343 families have become homeless due to erosion. The rivers have expanded to cover 10,501 acres (42.50 km^{2}) of land, 17 schools and colleges, 3 madrasas, 22 mosques and temples, 1,222 ponds, 18 kilometer roads, 42 business establishments, and 500 acres (2.0 km^{2}) of betel nut groves.

Mehendigonj has a history of its own in education and culture, trade and commerce, agriculture and artistry. But the Meghna, the Tentulia and the Mashkata have become the 'fait accompli' of three lakh people of the upazila. The rivers have already swallowed most of the areas of several unions including Gubindapur, Jagalia, Darirchar-Khajuria, Bhashanchar and Andermanik.

There is a documentary titled Mehendigonj of Barisal at Estuary of Meghna based on river erosion directed by Fuad Chowdhury. The documentary portrays the severity of river erosion in monsoon season (July–September). Only in 2007, 12,000 acres (49 km^{2}) of land was engulfed by the river Meghna, making around forty thousand people landless, especially affecting women's privacy and security. Hardly any initiative can be seen to rehabilitate these affected people and to stop river erosions. Local people are helping each other's with limited resources. In the last 300 years, the feudal landlord (Jamidars) of Ulania of Mehendigonj built an estate of 100 buildings which are also under the threat of Meghna erosion.

== Demographics ==
Religions in Mehendiganj Upazila (2022)
Religion	Percent
Islam	96.24%
Hinduism	3.75%
Other or not stated	0.01%

According to the 2022 Bangladeshi census, Mehendiganj Upazila had 69,895 households and a population of 283,890. 10.40% of the population were under 5 years of age. Mehendiganj had a literacy rate (age 7 and over) of 71.23%: 69.20% for males and 73.06% for females, and a sex ratio of 91.76 males for every 100 females. 43,041 (15.16%) lived in urban areas.

According to the 2011 Census of Bangladesh, Mehendiganj Upazila had 65,231 households and a population of 301,046. 79,522 (26.42%) were under 10 years of age. Mehendiganj had a literacy rate (age 7 and over) of 48.57%, compared to the national average of 51.8%, and a sex ratio of 1,049 females per 1,000 males. 33,802 (11.23%) lived in urban areas.

== Administration ==
UNO: Md. Riazur Rahman

Mehendigonj Thana was turned into an upazila in 1983 under Hussain Muhammad Ershad's decentralization programme.

Mehendiganj Upazila is divided into Mehendiganj Municipality and 16 union parishads: Alimabad, Andharmanik, Bhasanchar, Bidyanandapur, Chandpur, Char Ekkaria, Char Gopalpur, Dakshin Ulania, Darichar Khajuria, Gobindapur, Jangalia, Joynagar, Lata, Mehendiganj, Sreepur, and Uttar Ulania. The union parishads are subdivided into 115 mauzas and 142 villages.

== Notable residents ==
- Asad Chowdhury, poet
- Abdul Gaffar Choudhury, journalist and author of the lyrics of Bengali patriotic song 'Ekusher Gaan'
- Shah M. Abul Hussain, member of parliament for Barisal-4 and State Minister of Finance and Planning from 2001 to 2006

== See also ==
- Upazilas of Bangladesh
- Districts of Bangladesh
- Divisions of Bangladesh
- Thanas of Bangladesh
- Union councils of Bangladesh
