= Altaf Mahmud =

Bangladeshi musician and freedom fighter (1933–1971)

- আলতাফ মাহমুদ
- Born: 23 December 1933; Barisal, Bengal Presidency, British India
- Died: 11 September 1971 (aged 37); Nakhalpara, Dhaka, Bangladesh
- Occupations: Freedom fighter, composer, cultural activists
- Spouse: Sara Ara Mahmud
- Children: 1
- Awards: Ekushey Padak; Independence Day Award

Altaf Mahmud (23 December 1933 – September 1971) was a musician, cultural activist, and martyred freedom fighter of the Bangladesh Liberation War. He was also a language activist of the Language Movement and composer of "Amar Bhaier Rokte Rangano", the famous song written to commemorate the event. He was awarded Ekushey Padak in 1977 and Independence Day Award in 2004 posthumously by the government of Bangladesh.

== Early life ==
Altaf Mahmud was born in Patarchar village of Muladi thana under Bakerganj (now Barisal, Bangladesh). He finished his matriculation from Barisal Zilla School. Mahmud was then admitted to BM College before he went to Kolkata to learn painting at the Calcutta Arts School. Mahmud started singing while he was a school boy. He first learnt music from famous violin player Suren Roy. He learnt to sing gana sangit (people's song), which brought him popularity during that time.

== Career ==
Mahmud came to Dhaka in 1950 and joined in Dhumketu Shilpi Shongho. Later he became the music director of the institution. In 1956, Mahmud was invited to the Vienna Peace Conference. But he was unable to attend as his passport was confiscated by the government at Karachi. There he stayed until 1963 and took talim of classical music to Ustad Abdul Kader Khan. He also associated with dance director Ghanashyam and music director Debu Bhattacharya. After returning from Karachi to Dhaka, Mahmud worked in 19 different films. Along with the famous Jibon Theke Neya, he also worked in films like Kaise Kahu, Kar Bau, and Tanha. He also remained associated with politics and different cultural organizations. In addition to his talent in music, Mahmud was also fluent in painting.

== Language Movement and Liberation War ==
During 1950 he sang gonoshongit in many places to inspire the activists of the Language Movement. Along with his singing, Mahmud continued to support the movement. He composed the music for the song Amar Bhaier Rokte Rangano in 1969, in Zahir Raihan's film Jibon Theke Neya.

Mahmud took part in the Bangladesh Liberation War in 1971. He created a secret camp inside his house for the freedom fighters. When the location of this camp was revealed, the Pakistan Army caught him on 30 August 1971. Mahmud was tortured by them, and many other guerrilla fighters like Shafi Imam Rumi were also captured by the Pakistan Army on that day.

Mahmud and many other fighters were captured and killed in this incident. His patriotic songs, which were broadcast at the Swadhin Bangla Betar Kendra, also inspired the independence fighters during the war.

== Personal life and legacy ==
Altaf Mahmud was married to Sara Ara Mahmud (d. 2025); she served as a director of the Department of Drama and Film at Shilpakala Academy.

On 18 July 2013, Ali Ahsan Mohammad Mojaheed was found guilty and received a life sentence on the charge related to the killing of Rumi along with Badi, Jewel, Azad and Altaf Mahmud at the army camp set up in Nakhalpara, Dhaka, during the Liberation War.
