= Maidul Islam =

Bangladeshi politician

Member of Bangladesh Parliament

Personal details
- Party: Jatiya Party (Ershad)

Maidul Islam is a Jatiya Party (Ershad) politician and a former member of parliament for Barisal-4.

== Career ==
Islam was elected to parliament from Barisal-4 as a Jatiya Party candidate in 1986 and 1988.
