= Ekusher Gaan =

Bengali patriotic song

English: "Song of the Twenty-first"
- একুশের গান
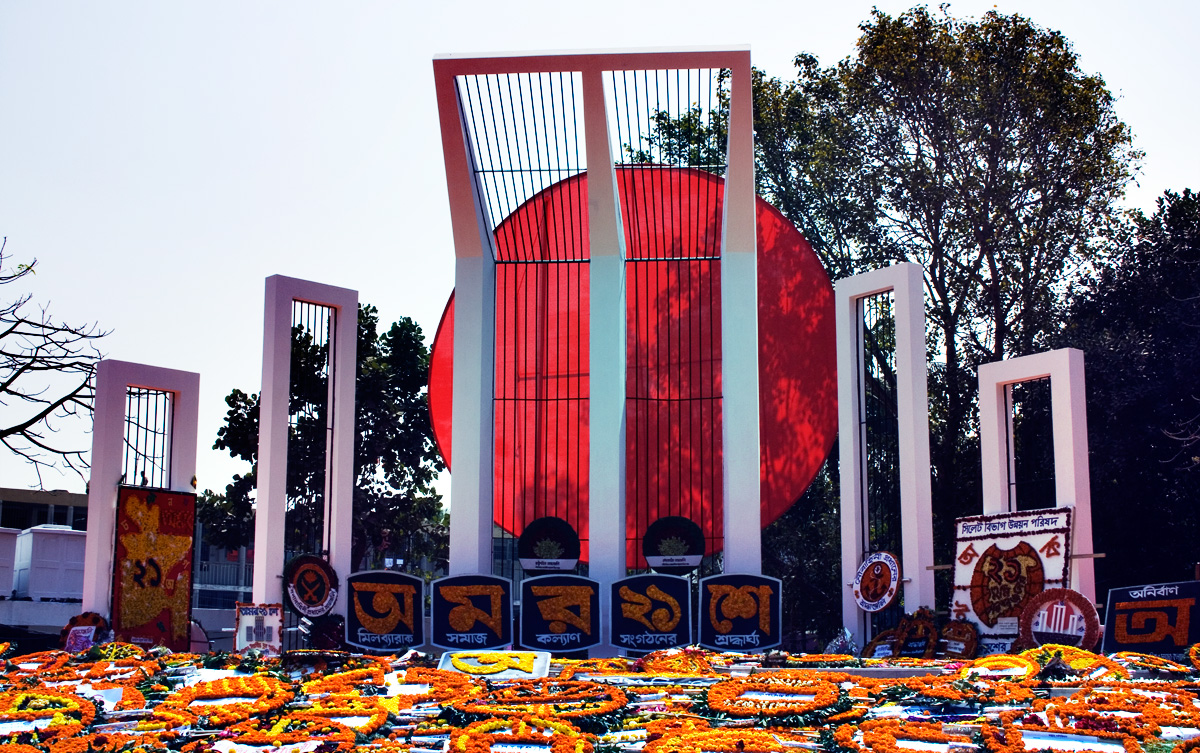
- Shaheed Minar of Dhaka
- Lyrics: Abdul Gaffar Choudhury, 1952
- Music: Altaf Mahmud, 1969

"Ekusher Gaan" (Bengali: একুশের গান [ˈekuʃeɾ gan]; "Song of the Twenty-first"), more popularly known by its incipit as "Amar Bhaiyer Rokte Rangano" (Bengali: আমার ভাইয়ের রক্তে রাঙানো [ˈamaɾ ˈbʱai̯jeɾ ˈrɔkte ˈraŋano]; "My Brothers' Blood Spattered"), is a Bengali protest song written by Abdul Gaffar Choudhury to mark the Bengali language movement in 1952 East Bengal. It was first published anonymously on the last page of a newspaper with the headline Ekusher Gaan, but was later published in Ekushey's February edition.

The song was initially written as a poem in 1952 at the bedside of an injured language movement activist who was shot by the Pakistani military police. The cultural secretary of the Jubo League gave the poem to Abdul Latif to put to a tune, which Latif Atikul Islam first sang. The students of Dhaka College also sang the song when they attempted to build a Shaheed Minar on their college premises, getting them expelled from the college. Altaf Mahmud, a renowned composer and a martyr of the Bangladesh Liberation War, recomposed the song in 1969 using Abdul Latif's version, which is now a quasi-official tune.

The song is often recognized as the most influential song of the language movement, reminding numerous Bangladeshis about the conflicts of 1952. Every 21 February sees people from all parts of Bangladesh heading to the Shaheed Minar in the probhat feri, a barefoot march to the monument, paying homage to those killed in the language movement demonstrations by singing this song. It is regarded by the listeners of BBC Bengali Service as the third best song in Bengali.
