= Pankaj Nath =

Bangladeshi politician

- পংকজ নাথ
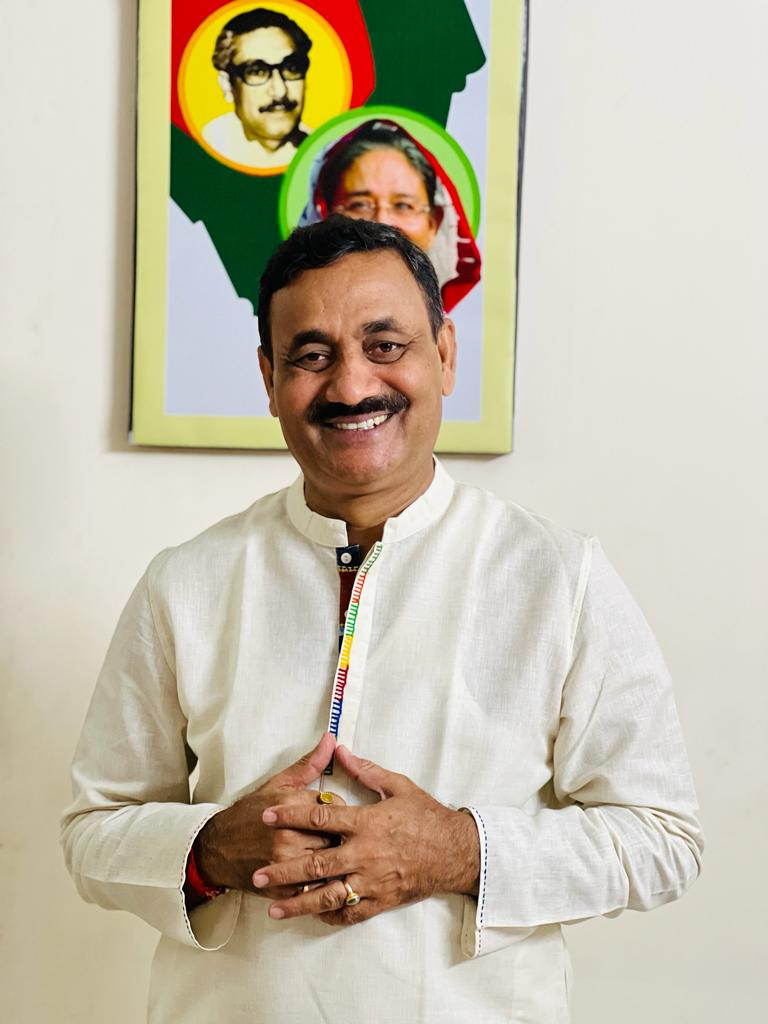
- Nath in 2024

Member of the Bangladesh Parliament for Barisal-4
- In office 29 January 2014 – 6 August 2024
- Preceded by: Md. Mazbauddin Farhad

Personal details
- Born: 25 September 1966 (age 60)
- Party: Independent
- Other political affiliations: Awami League
- Education: University of Dhaka

Pankaj Nath (born 25 September 1966) is an independent politician and a former Jatiya Sangsad member representing the Barisal-4 constituency.

== Career ==
Pankaj Nath was elected to the parliament from Barisal-4 in 2014 and 2018 as a candidate of Bangladesh Awami League. He owns Bihanga Paribahan, a bus transport company, which was founded in 2009. He served as the General Secretary of Awami Swechchhashebok League.

In September 2022, he was dismissed from all party positions, including as member of the advisory council, for violating party discipline.

On 26 November 2023, Awami League announced the final list of its 298 candidates to contest the 2024 national election which did not include Nath.

In the 2024 general election, after not getting the Awami League nomination, Pankaj decided to participate as an independent candidate and he was elected easily because the Awami League nominated candidate was declared disqualified by the election commission because of dual citizenship.
