= Barisal District =

District in Bangladesh

Barisal District বরিশাল জেলা
- District
- Barishal District
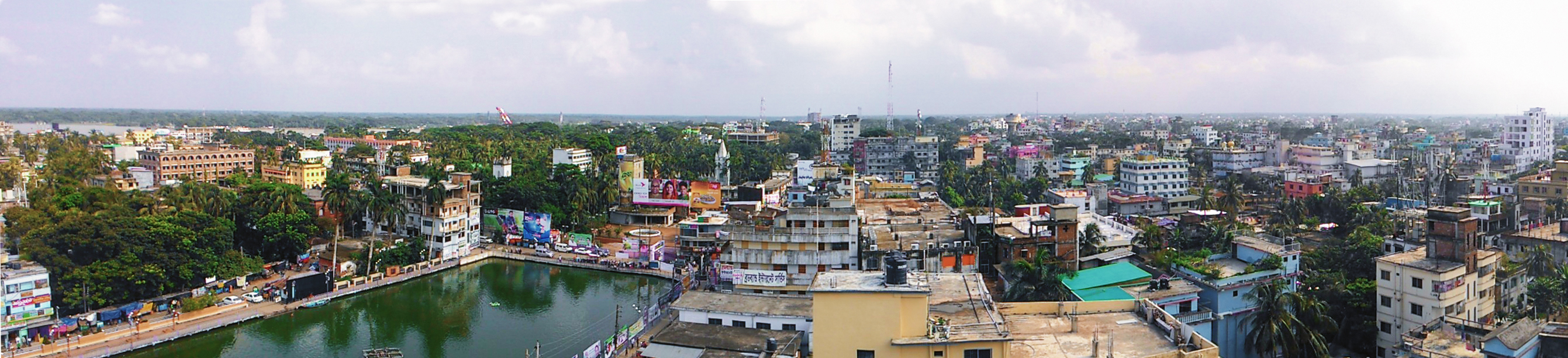
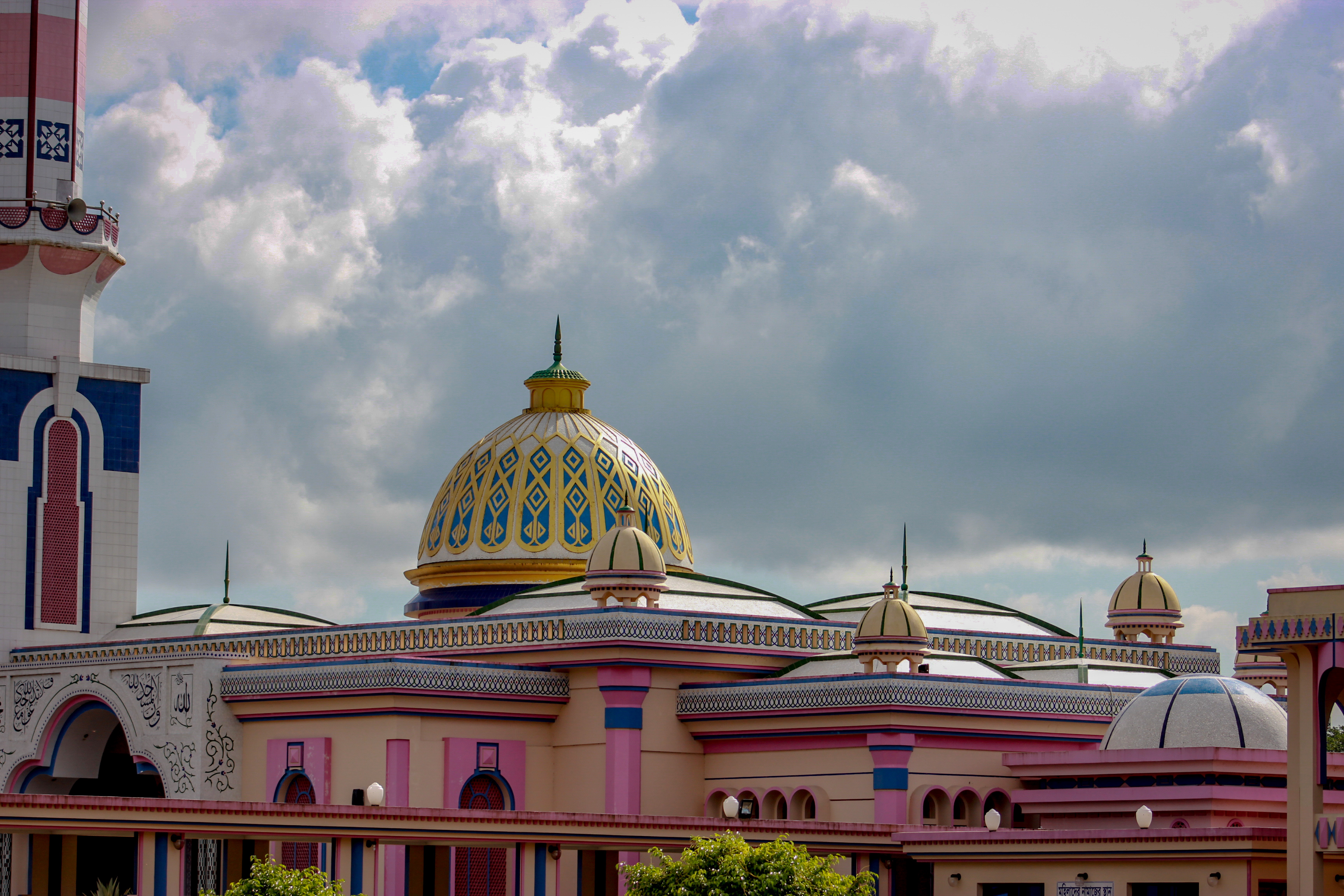
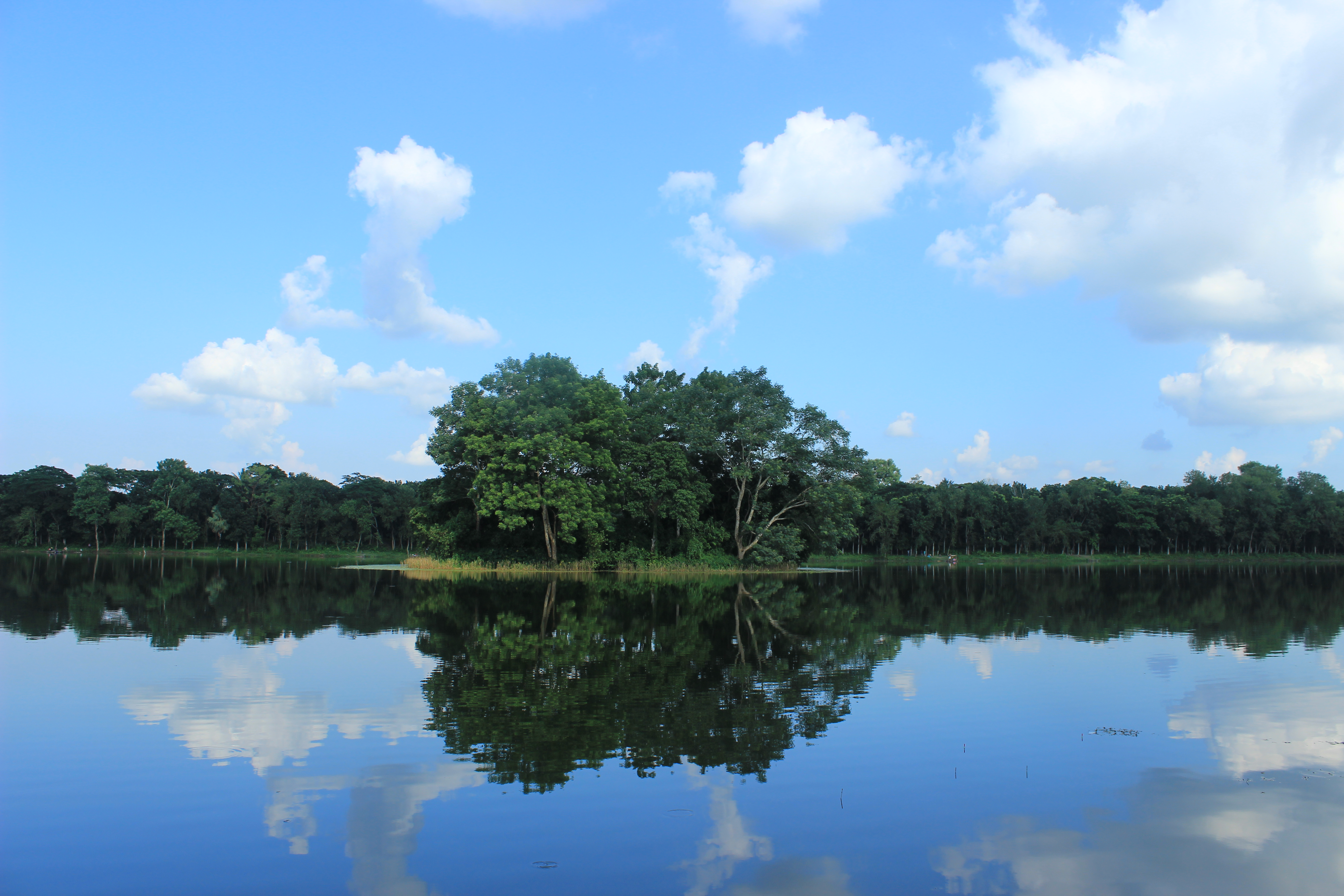
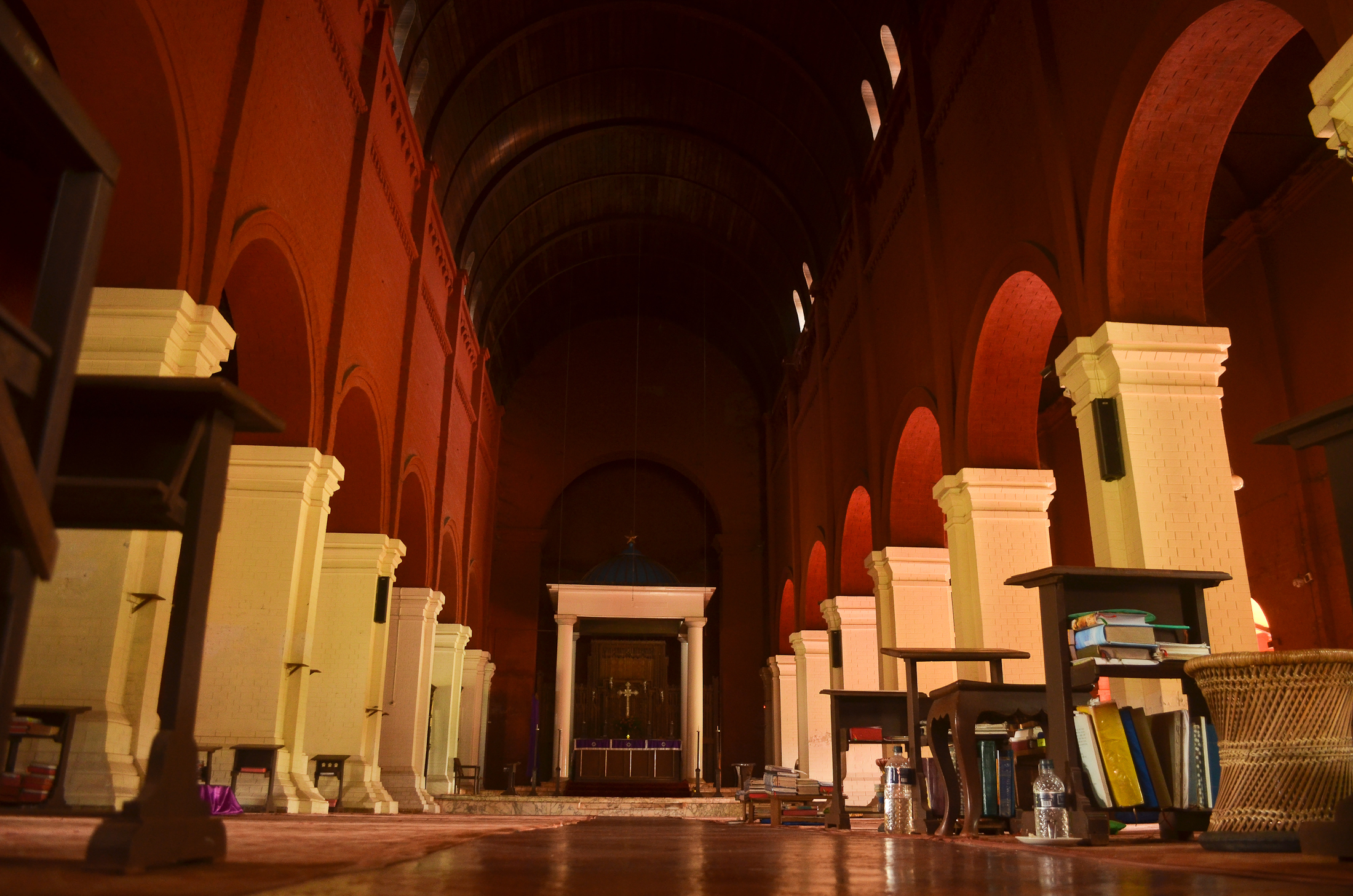
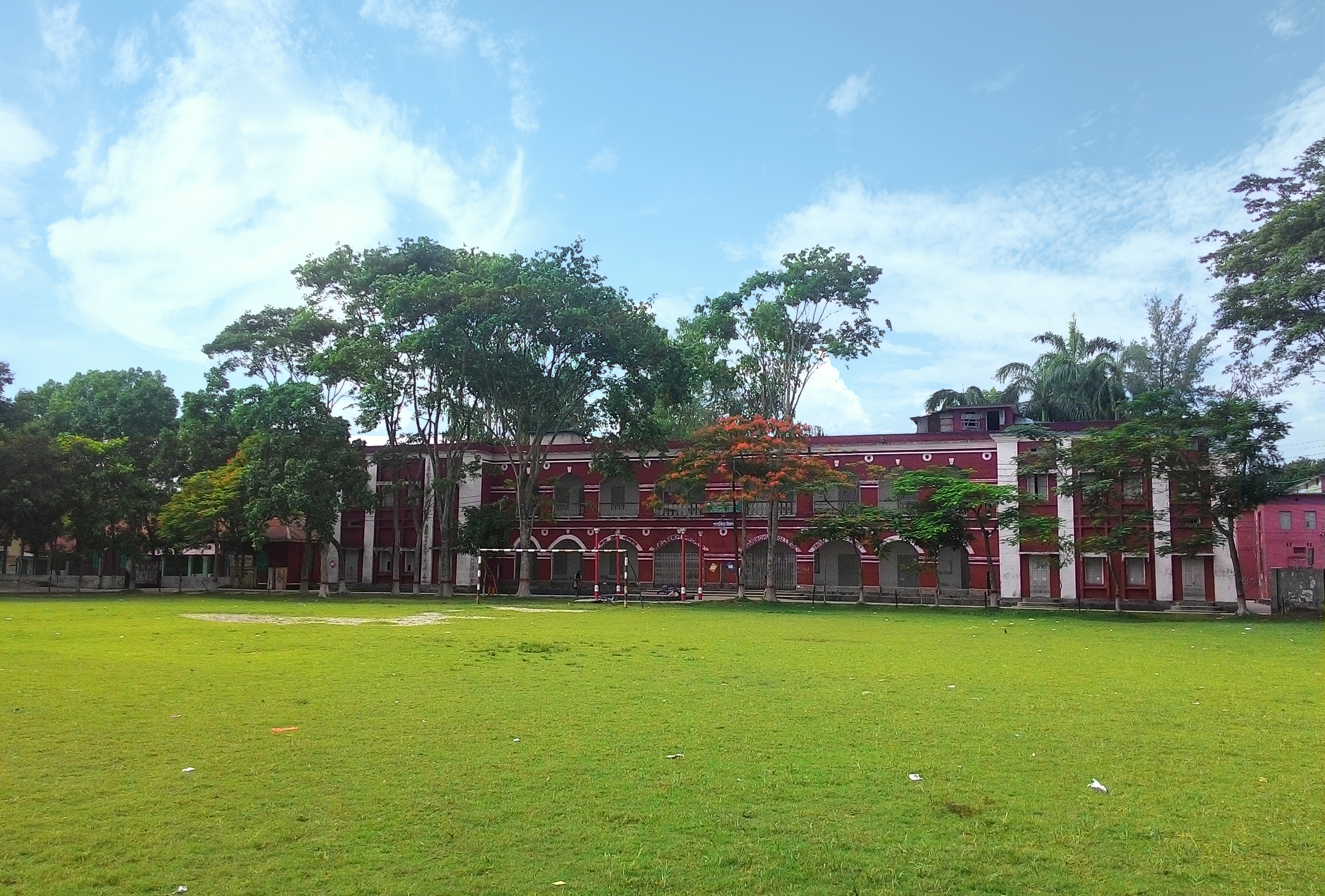
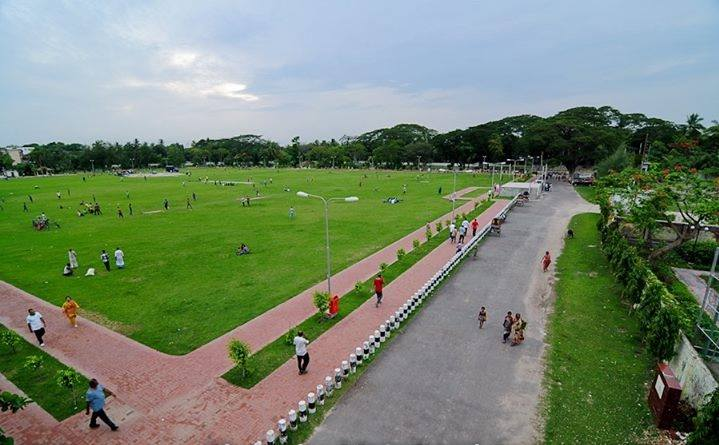
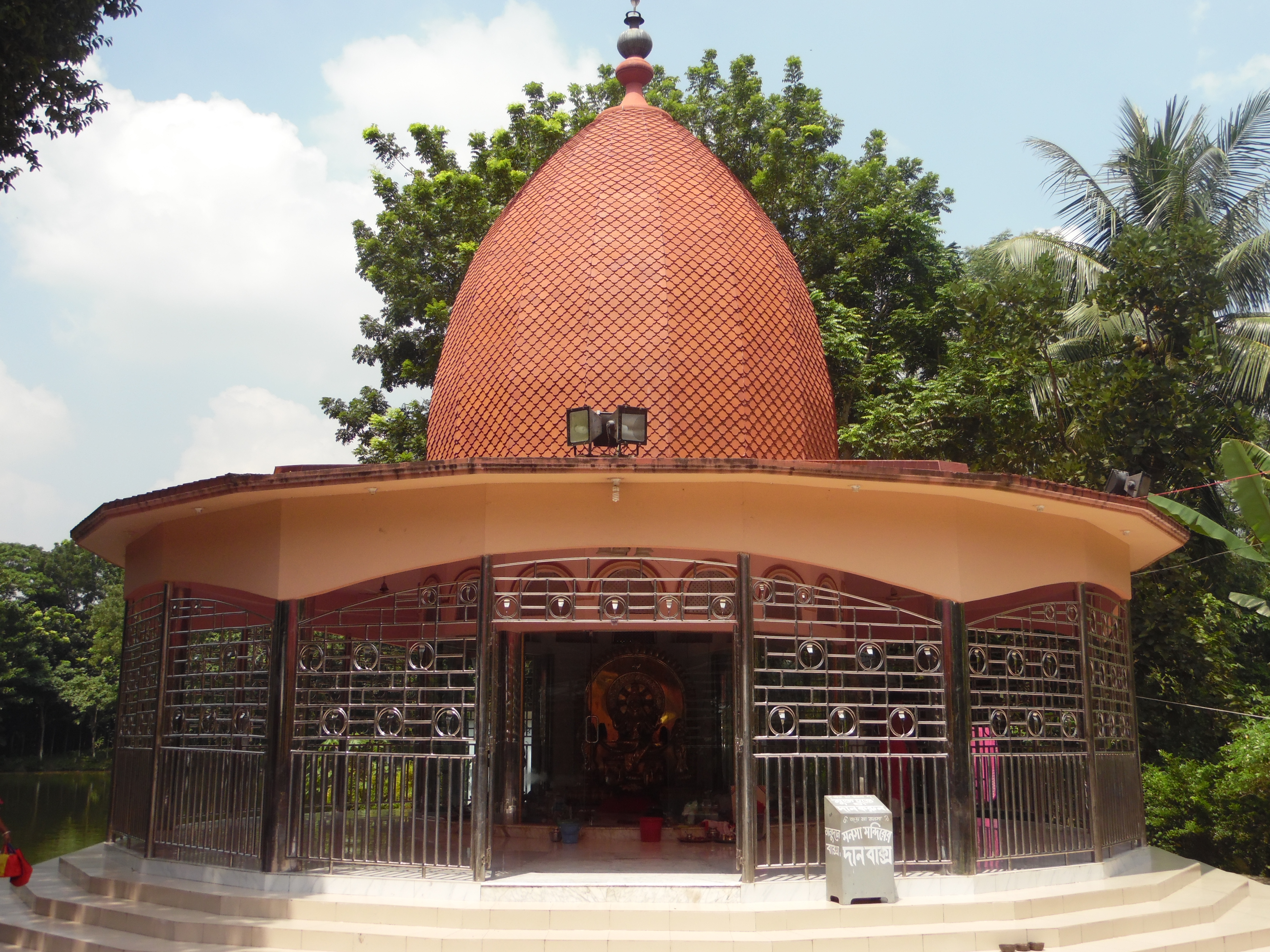
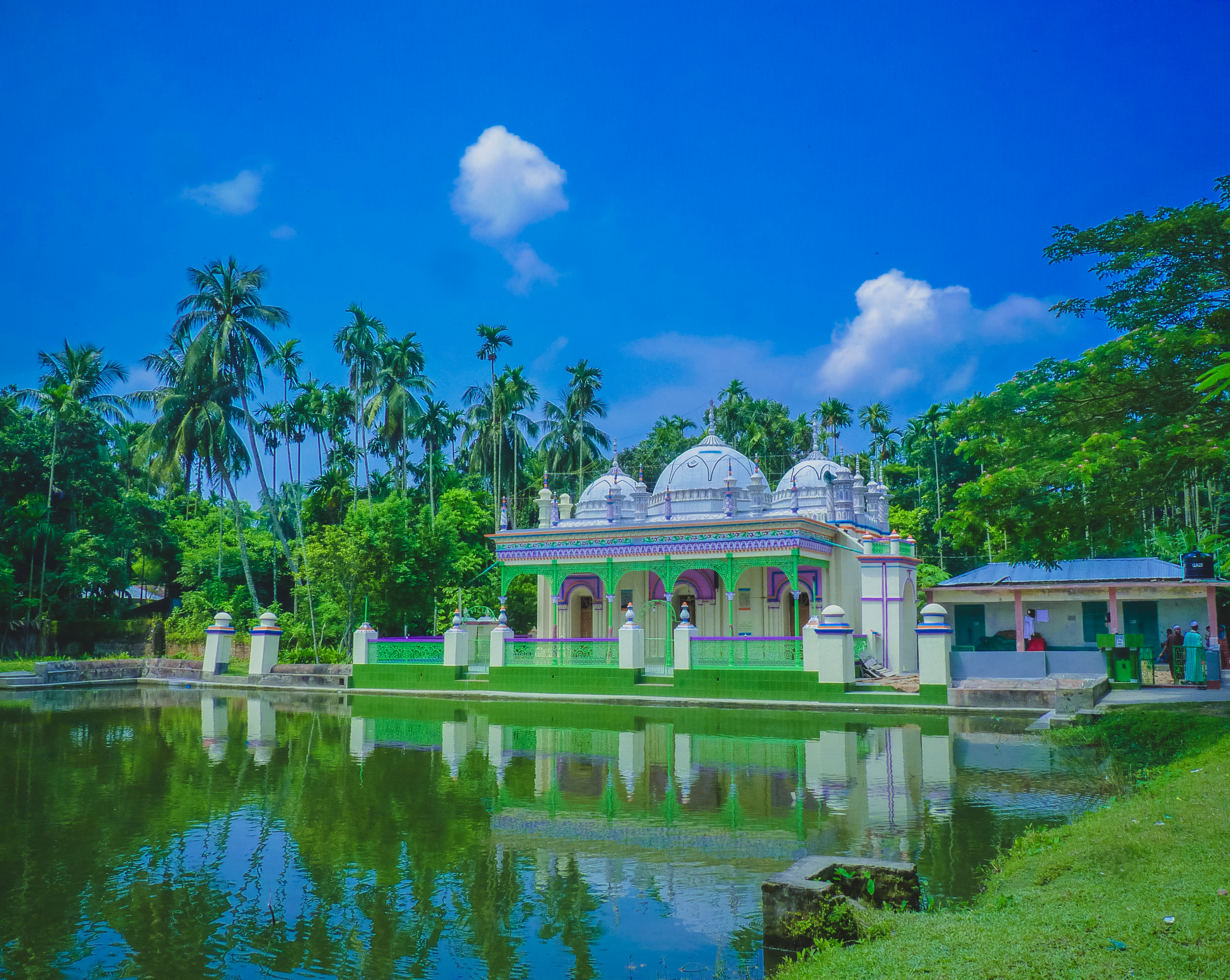
- From top: City skyline, Guthia Mosque, Durga Sagar lake, Oxford Mission Church, Brojomohun College, Bell's Park, Kasba Mosque, Paddle steamer at Kirtonkhola River port, Satlar Bil, Manasa Mandir of Bijoy Gupta and Ulania Zamnindar Bari Mosque.
- Interactive map of Barisal District
- Coordinates: 22.80°N 90.37°E
- Country: Bangladesh
- Division: Barisal
- Bakerganj District: 1797
- Seat: Barisal

Government
  - Deputy Commissioner: Mohammad Delwar Hossain

Area
  - Total: 2,784.52 km^{2} (1,075.11 sq mi)
- Elevation: 4 m (13 ft)
- Highest elevation: 14 m (46 ft)
- Lowest elevation: −4 m (−13 ft)

Population (2022)
  - Total: 2,570,446
  - Density: 923.120/km^{2} (2,390.87/sq mi)
- Demonyms: Barishali, Barishailla
- Time zone: UTC+06:00 (BST)
- Postal code: 8200
- Area code: 0431
- ISO 3166 code: BD-06
- HDI (2023): 0.702 high · 4th of 22

Barisal District, officially Barishal District (Bengali: বরিশাল জেলা) or formerly called Bakerganj District, is a district in south-central Bangladesh; it was established as Bakerganj district in 1797. Its headquarters is in Barisal city, which is also the headquarters of Barisal Division.

== Etymology ==
Barisal District is named after its headquarters, the city of Barisal. The toponym Barisal is etymologically derived from the Perso-Arabic phrase "Bahr-e-Sawal," translating to "the ship of questions". This appellation is rooted in the interactions of Semitic Arab maritime traders, who, in their nautical endeavours, referred to their sea-bound merchant vessels as bahr, which has endured as a term in the lexicon of the Bengali language to this day. The perilous and turbulent waters of Bengal's southern seacoast, notorious for their treacherous waves, presented a hazardous maritime route. As such, upon encountering this tempestuous stretch of coastline, the Arab traders would often be prompted to pose various queries (sawal) regarding the safety, conditions, and navigability of the route. Over time, this word was corrupted to the name Barisal.

== History ==
The historic land of ancient Vaṅga (Bôngô in Bengali), situated in present-day Barisal. Barishal was likely slowly built over time from silt from the Padma, Jamuna, and Meghna Rivers. The region was part of the ancient Gangaridai empire. Barisal was part of the early empires of Bengal, like the Palas and the Senas. A copper plate has been found in present Mehendiganj Upazila showing a land grant made to a Brahmin by Keshab Sen. However, the Hindu kings only controlled the northern part of the district, while dense forests covered the southern part and isolated the inhabitants from outside influence.

After the conquest of the Senas by Bakhtiyar Khilji, various Hindu nobles spread out over the eastern delta. The royal family of Chandradwip, also called Bakla, was originally one of these families. Throughout the period of the Bengal sultanate, the rulers of Chandradwip managed to retain somewhat of their independence. However, when the Mughals overthrew the Bengal Sultanate in 1576, they began to reorganise the province for easier governance. In the Ain-i-Akbari, the Bakla Sarkar of the Bengal Subah included present-day Barisal division. However, the rulers of Chandradwip were still independent and were part of the Baro-Bhuiyans of Bengal. In 1584, Abul Fazl recorded a large storm wave impacting Chandradwip, which he says killed the king and 200,000 of his subjects.

At this time, the Barisal region was subjected to the raids of the Maghs supported by the Portuguese. Portuguese mercenaries were employed by the Raja of Chandradwip, but they mainly aided the King of Arakan in raiding the Meghna estuary. After a force of Portuguese pirates was defeated by the Mughals in 1608 in the Meghna, Sebastian Gonzales Tilao, with the support of the Raja of Chandradwip, took over Sandwip. Although they had agreed to divide the revenue of the island, Tilao soon betrayed his ally and began raiding the eastern part of Chandradwip. In 1615, the Arakanese took back Sandwip, but they soon extended their own piracy to Chandradwip and caused a mass flight of nobles to Madhabpasha in present Babuganj Upazila.

In 1639, Shah Shuja defeated the Maghs in battle in present Jhalokati district and built a ring of forts to the south of Barisal largely in present Jhalokati district to protect the region from Magh attacks. After this time, the Barisal region passed under direct Mughal control and the Chandradwip rajas faded into obscurity, with much of the southern part of the district being cleared and settled by mainly Muslim pirs who spread their Islamic cosmology among the local tribes of the region.

The early 18th century was tumultuous for the district due to the movement of the Subah capital from Dhaka to Murshidabad. Adventurers began preying on existing Zamindars. One of these was Mirza Agha Baqer, who had suppressed a rebellion of a Hindu zamindar. In 1730, he became Governor of Chittagong and lived in Dhaka. In 1753, he assassinated a naib nazim and was killed himself a day later. Aga Bakhar's heir inherited his land in Selimabad but was overthrown by the Naib Nazim Nawazish Muhammad Khan, advised by his diwan Raja Rajballabh. He was killed by Mir Qasim after the Battle of Plassey. At this time the Maghs also restarted their raids so that in British records the southern part of Barisal Division is depopulated. Barisal District traces its origins to Bakerganj district which was established in 1797. It was placed in Barisal Division on 1 January 1993.

== Demographics ==
Historical population
| Year | Pop. | ±% p.a. |
|---|---|---|
| 1974 | 1,648,068 | — |
| 1981 | 1,965,950 | +2.55% |
| 1991 | 2,207,426 | +1.17% |
| 2001 | 2,355,967 | +0.65% |
| 2011 | 2,324,310 | −0.14% |
| 2022 | 2,570,446 | +0.92% |

At the 2022 census, Barisal District had 629,626 households and a population of 2,570,446 with an average of 4.02 people per household. Among the population, 475,192 (18.49%) inhabitants were under 10 years of age. The population density was 923 people per km^{2}. Barisal District had a literacy rate (age 7 and over) of 79.85%, compared to the national average of 74.80%, and a sex ratio of 1047 females per 1000 males. Approximately 30.23% of the population lived in urban areas. The ethnic population was 843.

=== Religion ===
Religions in Barisal District (2022)
| Religion | Percent |
| Islam | 88.85% |
| Hinduism | 10.71% |
| Christianity | 0.43% |
| Other or not stated | 0.01% |

Religion in present-day Barisal District (Note: Sadar subdivision of Bakerganj district without Nalchiti, Jhalokati and Rajapur thanas)
| Religion | 1941 | | 1981 | | 1991 | | 2001 | | 2011 | | 2022 | |
| Religion | Pop. | % | Pop. | % | Pop. | % | Pop. | % | Pop. | % | Pop. | % |
|---|---|---|---|---|---|---|---|---|---|---|---|---|
| Islam | 724,289 | 66.17% | 1,662,391 | 84.56% | 1,902,667 | 86.19% | 2,054,754 | 87.21% | 2,040,088 | 87.77% | 2,283,728 | 88.85% |
| Hinduism | 361,602 | 33.04% | 287,685 | 14.63% | 289,263 | 13.10% | 286,642 | 12.17% | 271,706 | 11.69% | 275,263 | 10.71% |
| Christianity | 8,536 | 0.78% | 14,963 | 0.76% | 13,797 | 0.63% | 13,217 | 0.56% | 12,227 | 0.53% | 11,138 | 0.43% |
| Others (Note: Including Jainism, Buddhism, Zoroastrianism, Judaism, Ad-Dharmis, or not stated) | 173 | 0.02% | 911 | 0.05% | 1,699 | 0.08% | 1,354 | 0.06% | 289 | 0.01% | 317 | 0.01% |
| Total Population | 1,094,600 | 100% | 1,965,950 | 100% | 2,207,426 | 100% | 2,355,967 | 100% | 2,324,310 | 100% | 2,570,446 | 100% |

Islam is the predominant religion in the district, with a Hindu minority composed mainly of Namasudras along with an even smaller Christian minority. The northwestern part of erstwhile Bakerganj district, along with Gopalganj subdivision of Faridpur district, was the only large part of East Bengal where Hindus outnumbered Muslims during the British era. However, since partition, Hindus have been fleeing the district in large numbers, mainly to India, especially after major violence in 1950 and 1964 and during the independence war. Among the 10 upazilas of the district, the Agailjhara Upazila has the highest percentage share of Hindus at 40 per cent, while the Muladi Upazila has the lowest at just 1.7 per cent, according to the 2022 Bangladesh census. Christians mainly live in northwestern Barisal and converted from Namasudras during the British period.

== Administration ==
Barisal District is divided into the following upazilas (formerly called thanas) along with Barishal City Corporation:

1. Agailjhara
2. Babuganj
3. Bakerganj
4. Banaripara
5. Barisal Sadar
6. Gournadi
7. Hizla
8. Mehendiganj
9. Muladi
10. Wazirpur

=== Villages ===
- Ambala, Bangladesh

== Education ==
Educational institutions in Barisal include

- Barisal Government Polytechnic Institute
- Barishal Cadet College
- Barishal Engineering College
- Government Barisal College
- Government Brojomohun College
- Sher-e-Bangla Medical College
- University of Barishal

== Notable residents ==
- A. K. Fazlul Huq, politician, chief minister of Bengal, and governor of erstwhile East Pakistan
- Syed Muhammad Ishaq, Islamic scholar, author, mufassir, debater, and educationist
- Syed Fazlul Karim, Islamic scholar and politician
- Abdul Wahab Khan, 3rd Speaker of the National Assembly of Pakistan
- Abdur Rahman Biswas, politician, president of Bangladesh
- Anil Biswas, music director and composer of Bollywood
- Aroj Ali Matubbar, philosopher
- Mahanambrata Brahmachari, Hindu saint
- Kanai Chatterjee, Bengali Maoist leader
- Abdul Gaffar Choudhury, journalist, who wrote Amar Bhaier Rokte Rangano to mark the Bengali Language Movement
- Altaf Mahmud, music director and lyricist, who composed Amar Bhaier Rokte Rangano
- Ghatak Pakhi Bhai, Bangladeshi matchmaker
- Jibanananda Das, poet of Ruposi Bangla
- Kusumkumari Das, poet and mother of Jibanananda Das
- Aswini Kumar Dutta, social worker, founder of BM College
- Brajamohan Dutta, Bengali philanthropist and social worker
- Hayat Mahmud, feudal lord, military commander, and founder of Miah Bari Mosque
- Mohiuddin Jahangir, Bir Sreshtho recipient
- Sal Khan, founder of Khan Academy
- Shamsuddin Abul Kalam, Bangladeshi novelist
- Sufia Kamal, female poet of Bangladesh
- Mahapran Jogendra Nath Mandal, Dalit leader and first minister of law and labour in Pakistan
- Tofazzal Hossain Manik Miah, editor of The Daily Ittefaq
- Hanif Sanket, television host, writer, producer
- Mosharraf Karim, Bangladeshi actor from Gaurnadi Upazila, TV actor
- Mohammad Abdul Jalil, sector commander in the war of 1971
- Kamrul Islam Rabbi, cricketer
- Yeasin Khan, footballer
- Pran Ranjan Sengupta, mathematician and scientist

== See also ==
- Thanas of Bangladesh
- Districts of Bangladesh
- Divisions of Bangladesh
- Upazila
- Villages of Bangladesh
- Administrative geography of Bangladesh
