= List of people from Barisal =

The following is a list of prominent people who were born in/lived in or around the city of Barisal as well as Barisal division in Bangladesh.

== Government and politics ==
- Abul Hasanat Abdullah, politician, former Chief Whip (Bangladesh)
- Serniabat Sadiq Abdullah, Mayor of Barisal
- Hafiz Uddin Ahmad, Bir Bikrom, politician, former Minister of Water Resources, former Minister of Commerce
- Mir Bakhsh Ali, Mughal-era faujdar of Bakla Sarkar (Barisal)
- Amir Hossain Amu, politician, former Minister of Industries
- Abdur Rahman Biswas, President of Bangladesh (1991–1996)
- Mohammad Ali Bogra (1909–1963), Bengali politician, 3rd Prime Minister of Pakistan
- Gurudas Dasgupta, member of the Indian Parliament
- Priya Ranjan Dasmunsi, noted Congress politician, former Union Minister and member of the 14th Lok Sabha of India; represented the Raiganj of West Bengal and was a member of the Indian National Congress party
- Shawkat Hossain Hiron, former Member of Parliament, Mayor of Barisal (2008-2013)
- Dr. Kamal Hossain, lawyer and politician, 1st Law Minister of Bangladesh, creator of the Constitution of Bangladesh
- Sher-e-Bangla A. K. Fazlul Huq, Prime Minister of Bengal (1937–1943), Chief Minister of East Bengal (1954) and Governor of East Pakistan (1956–1958)
- Syed Azizul Huq, politician and former Member of Parliament
- M. Sakhawat Hussain, Election Commissioner of Bangladesh (2007–2012)
- Abdul Jabbar Khan, Speaker of the National Assembly of Pakistan (1965–1969)
- Abdul Wahab Khan (1898–1972), 3rd speaker at the National Assembly of Pakistan
- Agha Baqer Khan, Mughal jagirdar after whom Bakerganj was named after
- Ajyal Khan, governor of Bakla under Sultan Ruknuddin Barbak Shah
- Bayram Khan, Mughal faujdar of Bakla
- Buzurg Umed Khan, Mughal faujdar of Bakla after whom Buzurg Umedpur in Barisal is named
- Hasem Ali Khan, politician, lawyer, former cabinet minister, peasant movement leader
- Niamat Khan, Vizier of Bakla-Chandradwip
- Sabi Khan, Mughal faujdar of Bakla
- Kazi Golam Mahbub, language movement activist and politician
- Jogendra Nath Mandal, one of the Founding Fathers of Pakistan, first Law Minister of Pakistan
- Jahangir Kabir Nanak, politician, former State Minister of Local Government, Rural Development and Co-operatives
- Shahjahan Omar, Bir Uttam, politician, former State Minister of Law
- Abdur Rahim, founding leader of Bangladesh Jamaat-e-Islami
- Nasreen Jahan Ratna, politician, former member of parliament
- Mazibur Rahman Sarwar, politician, former Mayor of Barisal and former member of parliament for Barisal-5
- Delwar Hossain Sayeedi, vice-president of Bangladesh Jamaat-e-Islami
- Manikuntala Sen, revolutionary
- Abdur Rab Serniabat, cabinet minister

== Art, literature, journalism, and philosophy ==
- Muhammad Reazuddin Ahmad, Islamic writer, journalist, and thinker
- Jogesh Chandra Bagal, Indian journalist, historian and writer
- Abdul Gaffar Choudhury, an author, columnist, lyricist
- Asad Chowdhury, poet, writer, translator, radio, television personality and journalist
- Jibanananda Das, Bengali poet, writer, novelist and essayist
- Kusumkumari Das, poet, writer and social activist
- Mukunda Das, Bengali poet, ballad singer, composer
- Narayan Gangopadhyay, writer and academic
- Buddhadeb Guha, writer
- Ahsan Habib, poet and journalist
- Abul Hasan, poet and journalist
- Shamsuddin Abul Kalam, writer
- Sufia Kamal, poet
- Tofazzal Hossain Manik Miah, founding editor of The Daily Ittefaq
- Aroj Ali Matubbar, philosopher
- Ghulam Murshid, Bangladeshi author, scholar, and journalist, based in London
- Abu Zafar Obaidullah, Bengali poet and language movement activist
- Bazlur Rahman, journalist and editor of The Sangbad
- Kamini Roy, Bengali poet, social worker and feminist
- Golam Sarwar, journalist and writer, founding editor of daily Samakal and Jugantor
- Barun Sengupta, journalist, political critic, founder-editor of daily Bartaman

== Entertainment ==
=== Film, television, theater, and radio ===
- Tania Ahmed, television actress and model
- Atiqul Haque Chowdhury, media personality
- Arundhati Devi, actress and director
- Utpal Dutt, actor, director, and playwright
- Alamgir Kabir, film director and cultural activist
- Mosharraf Karim, film and television actor
- Shahidul Islam Khokon, filmmaker and producer
- Golam Mustafa, film actor
- Suborna Mustafa, film and television actress
- Sohel Rana, film actor, director and producer
- Masum Parvez Rubel, film actor
- Mir Sabbir, television actor and director
- Omar Sani, film actor
- Hanif Sanket, television host, writer and producer, best known as the creator and host of popular television show Ittyadi
- Nikhil Sen, dramatist

=== Singers and instrumentalists ===
- Anil Biswas, film song composer
- Nachiketa Chakraborty, Indian musician
- Nikhil Ghosh, musician and teacher
- Pannalal Ghosh, musician and flutist
- Parul Ghosh, playback singer
- Abdul Latif, singer, musician, and lyricist
- Altaf Mahmud, musician and language movement activist
- Khalid Hassan Milu, singer
- Manabendra Mukhopadhyay, music composer and singer of Nazrul geeti
- Papia Sarwar, singer

=== Performing arts ===
- Jewel Aich, magician and bansuri player
- Laxman Das, wrestler, weight lifter, circus performer, founder of Royal Pakistan Circus

== Educationist and reformers ==
- Abala Bose, educator and social reformer
- Ashwini Kumar Dutta, Bengali educationist, philanthropist, social reformer
- Sal Khan, American educator, mathematician and entrepreneur, founder of Khan Academy

== Freedom fighters and revolutionary ==
- A. B. Bardhan, Indian politician, trade union leader and the former general secretary of the Communist Party of India (CPI)
- Kirtinarayan Basu, 17th-century raja of Chandradwip who converted to Islam
- Kanai Chatterjee, Indian Maoist ideologue, founder of the Maoist Communist Centre of India
- Gurudas Dasgupta, Indian politician and a leader of Communist Party of India
- Ulfat Ghazi, naval commander and vizier
- Syed Hakim, commander during the conquest of Bakla (Barisal)
- Mohiuddin Jahangir, Bir Shreshto, Liberation War veteran
- Major M A Jalil, sector 9 commander during Bangladesh liberation war
- Mostafa Kamal, freedom fighter in Bangladesh liberation war
- Hayat Mahmud, feudal lord, commander and founder of Miah Bari Mosque
- Niranjan Sengupta, revolutionary
- Tarakeswar Sengupta, revolutionary

== Science and academia ==
- Swadesh Bose, Bengali language movement activist and economist
- Basudeb DasSarma, chemist
- Kadambini Ganguly, first South Asian female physician, social activist
- Biswajit Ghosh, professor, essayist and researcher
- Debaprasad Ghosh, Indian mathematician and politician
- Ranajit Guha, historian of the Indian subcontinent and founding member of the Subaltern Studies Group
- Hiranmay Sen Gupta, nuclear physicist
- A. M. Harun-ar-Rashid, physicist and professor of physics at the University of Dhaka
- Ehsan Hoque, medical doctor and philanthropist
- Sardar Fazlul Karim, scholar, academic, philosopher and essayist
- Nazia Khanum, OBE DL, academic and management consultant
- Amal Kumar Raychaudhuri, physicist, known for his research in general relativity and cosmology
- Hem Chandra Raychaudhuri, historian
- Tapan Raychaudhuri, historian
- Sukharanjan Samaddar, professor, educationalist, and martyred freedom fighter in the Bangladesh Liberation War
- Kaliprasanna Vidyaratna, Indian scholar of Sanskrit

== Religious leaders ==
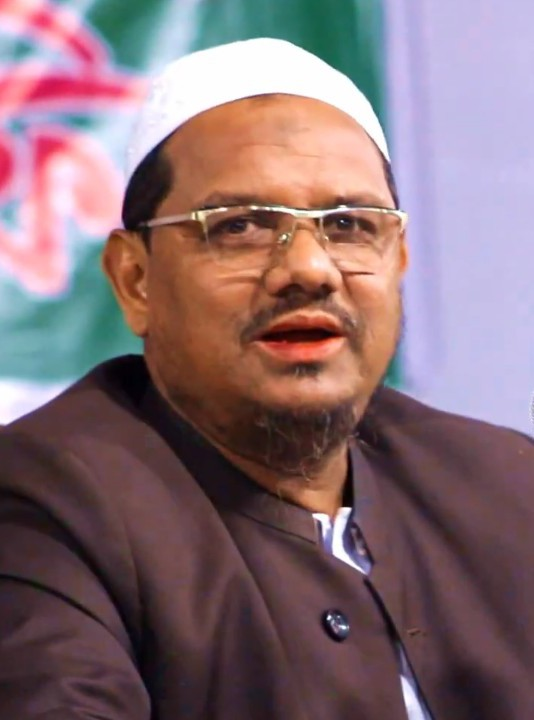
Syed Rezaul Karim is the leader of Islami Andolan Bangladesh, one of the country's biggest political parties.

=== Islam ===
- Nesaruddin Ahmad (1873–1952), inaugural Pir of Sarsina and founder of Darussunnat Kamil Madrasa
- Ayub Ali (1919–1995), former Principal of Government Madrasah-e-Alia, Dhaka
- Syed Muhammad Ishaq (1915–1977), Islamic scholar and inaugural Pir of Charmonai Darbar Sharif
- Syed Faizul Karim (born 1973), senior vice-president of Islami Andolan
- Syed Fazlul Karim (1935–2006), second Pir of Charmonai and founder of Islami Andolan
- Syed Rezaul Karim (born 1971), current Pir of Charmonai and leader of Islami Andolan
- Maqsudullah (1883–1961), inaugural Pir of Talgasia and founder of Ashraful Uloom Madrasa
- Muhammad Mustafizur Rahman (1941–2014), seventh vice chancellor of Islamic University of Kushtia
- Abu Zafar Mohammad Saleh (1915–1990), former Pir of Sarsina and Independence Award recipient

=== Other ===
- Edith Langridge, aka Mother Edith, led the Sisterhood of the Epiphany in Barisal
- Boro Maa, Hindu leader and a matriarch of the Matua Mahasangha

== Sports ==
- Zahid Hasan Ameli, footballer
- Shibdas Bhaduri, British Indian footballer of the 1910s
- Sukalyan Ghosh Dastidar, Indian footballer of the 1970s
- Sohag Gazi, cricketer
- Alamgir Hasan, footballer
- Mehidy Hasan, cricketer
- Salman Hossain, cricketer
- Tanvir Islam, cricketer
- Golam Kibria, cricketer
- Mohammad Manik, cricketer
- Zakaria Masud, cricketer
- Shahriar Nafees, cricketer
- Kamrul Islam Rabbi, cricketer
- Paresh Lal Roy, "father of Indian boxing"
- Golam Sarwar Tipu, footballer
