= Bayram Khan =

Mughal governor of Bakla (c. 17th–18th century)

Governor of Bakla sarkar
- Preceded by: Sabi Khan

Personal details
- Born: 17th century
- Died: 18th century

Bayram Khan (Persian: بیرم خان, Bengali: বৈরম খাঁ), popularly known as Burum Khan (Bengali: বুরুম খাঁ), was the governor of Mughal Bengal's Bakla Sarkar (present-day Barisal Division, Bangladesh) in the early 18th century. He played a notable role in the development and administration of the Barisal region.

== Career ==
Khan was a Mughal-era official who governed the Sarkar of Bakla, a significant administrative division in southern Bengal Subah during the late Mughal period. His administrative base likely included present-day areas of Barisal, Jhalokathi, and surrounding localities.

Among his most notable contributions was the excavation of large ponds or dighis, a common practice among Bengal administrators and zamindars to promote agriculture, water storage, and civic life. One such water reservoir attributed to him is Burum Khan's Dighi, located near the Dargah of Baro Auliya (Twelve Walis) in Bakerganj, which is still used today. He is also credited with digging the Ghazni Dighi in the village of Chanpura, under present-day Kotwali Model Thana, likely as part of a broader effort to develop rural infrastructure.

A prominent and often retold event associates Bayram (Burum) Khan with the Sufi saint Hazrat Ghazni Shah, who had settled in Chanpura to preach Islam and lead a life of ascetic devotion. Ghazni Shah would meditate on the banks of the dighi that Burum Khan had excavated in Chanpura. Over time, the pond became associated more with the saint than the governor, being referred to as Ghazni's Dighi. This is said to have incited envy in Burum Khan, leading to a tragic confrontation. Khan, who is accused in the prevalent narrative of having become overcome by jealousy, ordered the beheading of Hazrat Ghazni Shah. The saint was laid to rest near the dighi, where his mazar (mausoleum) still stands today.

A masonry building he constructed in the village of Kalakopa, near Aurabunia under Kathalia Upazila, was eventually destroyed by river erosion.

== See also ==
- Niamat Khan, an earlier vizier in Bakla/Barisal
- Mirza Agha Baqer, jagirdar of Buzurg-Umedpur and Salimabad
- Bakhsh Ali, a later faujdar of Bakla
- Syed Hakim, faujdar of Bakla
- Kirtinarayan Basu, fifth King of Chandradwip
- Hayat Mahmud, military commander of Chandradwip
