= Ulfat Ghazi =

Mughal commander (c. 17th century)

Vizier Zamindar of Nazirpur
- In office 1559
- Monarch: Jahangir
- Succeeded by: Syed Qutb Shah

Personal details
- Children: Syed Qutb Shah
- Military career
- Conflicts: Conquest of Bakla (1611)

Sayyid Ulfat Ghazi was a 17th-century nobleman, naval commander, and zamindar of the Mughal Empire during Jahangir (r. 1605–1627). He is particularly remembered for his role in the Mughal conquest of Bakla and his lasting legacy in the Barisal region of present-day Bangladesh.

== Biography ==
Ulfat Ghazi hailed from a noble Muslim family of Sayyids, tracing their lineage to Fatima, the daughter of the Islamic prophet Muhammad. It has been variously asserted that his origins lie in regions as disparate as Delhi, Ghazipur, and Bihar, with no singular consensus prevailing among sources. Nevertheless, he resided in the city of Jahangir Nagar, now known as Dhaka, during his political and military service. He also contributed to the propagation of Islam in the Barisal region.

Ulfat Ghazi played a crucial role in the Mughal conquest of Bakla in 1611, a key military campaign that consolidated Mughal authority in southern Bengal. While he is generally regarded as a vizier in the court of Jahangir, he has also been described as serving in a naval command capacity, reflecting the strategic importance of riverine and coastal warfare in Bengal during this Baro-Bhuiyan period. In recognition of his services, Emperor Jahangir separated the Tappe Nazirpur pargana from the larger Chandradwip pargana, thereby establishing a new administrative unit. This land grant was awarded to Sayyid Ulfat Ghazi, who became the Zamindar of Nazirpur, in what is now Barisal District. The toponymic origin of Wazirpur, literally translating to “City of the Vizier”, has been attributed by some to Wazir Sayyid Ulfat Ghazi, whose prominence in the Mughal administration may have lent the area its name; however, this interpretation remains contested, with alternative etymologies proposed by others.

His son and successor Sayyid Jan, better known by the spiritual title Syed Qutb Shah, settled in the village of Terachar and later Nalchira and served as a spiritual guide to Sabi Khan, the Faujdar of Bakla. The Miah family of Nalchira, his descendants, maintained a prominent presence in the history of Barisal, often occupying influential positions for centuries.

== See also ==
- Niamat Khan, an earlier vizier in Bakla/Barisal
- Mirza Agha Baqer, jagirdar of Buzurg-Umedpur and Salimabad
- Syed Hakim, faujdar of Bakla
- Kirtinarayan Basu, fifth King of Chandradwip
- Hayat Mahmud, military commander of Chandradwip
