= Boalia =

Boalia may refer to:

- Boalia, Muladi, a village in Muladi Upazila, Bangladesh
- Boalia, Bakerganj, a village in Bakerganj Upazila
- Boalia Thana, a thana in Rajshahi Division, Bangladesh
