= CRA =

CRA is an abbreviation for:

== Companies ==
- Conestoga-Rovers & Associates, a consulting engineering firm in Waterloo, Ontario, Canada
- Convenience Retail Asia, Hong Kong
- Conzinc Riotinto of Australia, a metals and mining company
- CRA International, a consultancy

== Credit reporting ==
- Credit bureau, known as consumer reporting agency (CRA) in the US, and credit rating agency (CRA) in the UK

== Job titles ==
- Certified Research Administrator
- Clinical research associate or Clinical Research Assistant in clinical trial
- Commander, Royal Artillery

== Laws ==
- Civil Rights Act (disambiguation), multiple US legislation
- Community Reinvestment Act of 1977 (US)
- Congressional Review Act of 1996 (US)
- Constitution Restoration Act of 2004/2005
- Cyber Resilience Act, EU, 2022

== Organizations ==
=== Australia ===
- Christian Research Association
- Commercial Radio Australia

=== Canada ===
- Canada Revenue Agency, administering tax laws
- Canadian Rheumatology Association, the national professional association for Canadian rheumatologists

=== Colombia ===
- Potable Water and Basic Sanitation Regulation Commission

=== European Union (EU) ===
- Cyber Resilience Act, an EU regulation for improving cybersecurity and cyber resilience

=== Japan ===
- Centrist Reform Alliance, a political alliance

=== Morocco ===
- Chabab Rif Al Hoceima, a football club
- Chabab Rif Al Hoceima (basketball)

=== Singapore ===
- Casino Regulatory Authority of Singapore

=== United Kingdom ===
- Cambridgeshire Rowing Association
- Congo Reform Association

=== United States ===
- Center for Renewing America, a conservative think tank
- Congress of Russian Americans, Russian émigré organization
- Champion Racing Association, auto racing sanctioning body
- Community redevelopment agency, urban renewal body
- Computing Research Association, academic department association
- Corn Refiners Association, trade association
- Critical Research Academy, a College of Education graduate program
- California Roadster Association, a racing governing body

== Other ==
- Community reinforcement approach to therapy for addiction
- Corona Australis (CrA), a constellation in the Southern Hemisphere

== See also ==
Crá, an Irish-language murder mystery television series.
