= Sabi Khan =

Mughal statesman

Faujdar of Sarkar Bakla
- In office 1618-?
- Monarch: Jahangir
- Governor: Ibrahim Khan Fath-i-Jang
- Preceded by: Syed Hakim
- Succeeded by: Bayram Khan

Ṣabīḥ Khān (Persian: صبيح خان), popularly known as Sabi Khan (Bengali: ছবি খাঁ), was a Mughal statesman best known for serving as the Kotwal and Faujdar of Bakla (Barisal) during the reign of Mughal emperor Jahangir. He was renowned for the construction of numerous roads, bridges, reservoirs and places of worship in the Barisal region. Henry Beveridge credits him as the first road-builder of the region. The Kotalipara Upazila is named after him.

== Early life and appointmentship ==
Sabi Khan was said to have arrived to the region during the reign of Mughal emperor Jahangir as a representative of the Subahdar (Governor) of Bengal. A minority of researchers opine that he was a contemporary of Sultan Daud Khan Karrani.

The Mughal governor, based in Jahangir Nagar (Old Dhaka), appointed Sabi Khan as the Faujdar of Bakla in 1618. He settled with his army in the village of Gaila-Fullasri in present-day Agailjhara. It is said that Gaila got its name from Golabarud, the Bengali word for ammunition, as ammunition was produced in this village by Sabi Khan and his group. The present Gaila Das Bari is thought to have been Sabi Khan's home due to the foundations discovered in the brick walls of the residence.

Henry Beveridge records a different account, which places Sabi Khan as the son of a wealthy merchant who was kidnapped at an early age and raised in the forests of Bakla-Chandradwip. Beveridge continues by narrating how Sabi's father was murdered many years later eventually leading to his mother escaping to the forests. In this account, she was married to Sabi Khan for a while not knowing of their relationship until the discovery of a mole in his foot. The legend explains Sabi Khan's architectural philanthropy to have been a means of Sabi Khan receiving forgiveness for the sin that he had committed.

== Contributions ==
Sabi Khan greatly contributed to the development of the Bakla-Chandradwip region, and signs of this can still be found in Gournadi, Wazirpur, Kotwali, Muladi and Kotalipara. During his time as faujdar, a large road was constructed from the port of Tarki to Madhabpasha (capital of Chandradwip) via Qasba, Gaila, Dhamura and Otra. He also constructed a road from Bakla to Kotalipara via Jhalkathi, Rahmatpur, Shikarpur and Gaila. In his own village, Gaila, there were three more roads. The first went from Ramdas-Hatkhola southwards to Dhamura and Otra, the second went from Kotalipara in the west towards Murshidabad and the third went from the southeast and merged with the present-day Gaila-Gaurnadi road. The 50-feet Gaila-Mashang road continues to be used today, though it is now reduced to 20 feet. On the two sides of the road, he had a dighi (reservoir) built for the locals and his army. A village was eventually established near the dighi which came to be known as Sabi Khar Par. He also constructed a road from Barisal to Bhurghata, and the Dhaka-Barisal highway was built upon it. He also had a road built from Nalchira to what would become the Sharikel Fort.

Other than roads, Sabi Khan also constructed numerous mosques in Gaila, Ramsiddhi, Qasba and Kotalipara. Brick and iron bridges can also be found on his constructed roads. One bridge in Gournadi was destroyed last century, though the ruins of one of Sabi Khan's bridges can be seen in the village of Ghanteshwar.

== Controversy ==
It is said that Emperor Jahangir allowed him to spend a lot of money on his philanthropic works. However, rumours then spread that Sabi Khan's works were not being done in Jahangir's name and that he had surpassed him in power and popularity. This angered the emperor, who called for his imprisonment. On one occasion, Ram Mishra, the progenitor of the Mishras of Gaila, caught Sabi Khan when he was asleep and took him to the soldiers of the Subahdar of Bengal. Sabi Khan was later released after the Subahdar released that the accusation was false.

== Personal life ==
Sabi Khan was a devout Sunni Muslim. He was a murid of Mir-i-Mashaikh, the dervish of Udchara in Jhalkathi. He was also a follower of Syed Qutb Shah, the dervish of Nalchira in Gournadi and son of Ulfat Ghazi. Khan was married to a woman from the village of Qasba in Gournadi.

== Death ==
After retirement, Sabi Khan remained in the Bakla region and devoted himself to religion. He had established a hujra in the village of Bankura in Batajor where he died. His hujra khana still stands today.

== See also ==
- History of Barisal
