= Cras =

Cras or CRAS may refer to:

== People with the surname ==
- Hendrik Constantijn Cras (1739–1820), Dutch jurist and city librarian of Amsterdam
- Hervé Cras (1910–1980), French military and naval historian
- Jean Cras (1879–1932), French composer and marine officer
- Steff Cras (born 1996), Belgian cyclist

== Places ==
Several places in France:

- Cras (Besançon), a district
- Cras, Isère, a commune
- Cras, Lot, a commune
- Cras-sur-Reyssouze, a commune in the Ain department

== Other uses ==
- Club de Radio Aficionados de El Salvador, an amateur radio organization
- Comptes rendus de l'Académie des Sciences, a French scientific journal
- Conservatory of Recording Arts and Sciences, an American technical school
- Cras navigation plotter, named after its inventor, Jean Cras (see above)

== See also ==
- CRA (disambiguation)
