= Jhalokati Sadar Upazila =

Jhalokathi Sadar ঝালকাঠি সদর
- Upazila
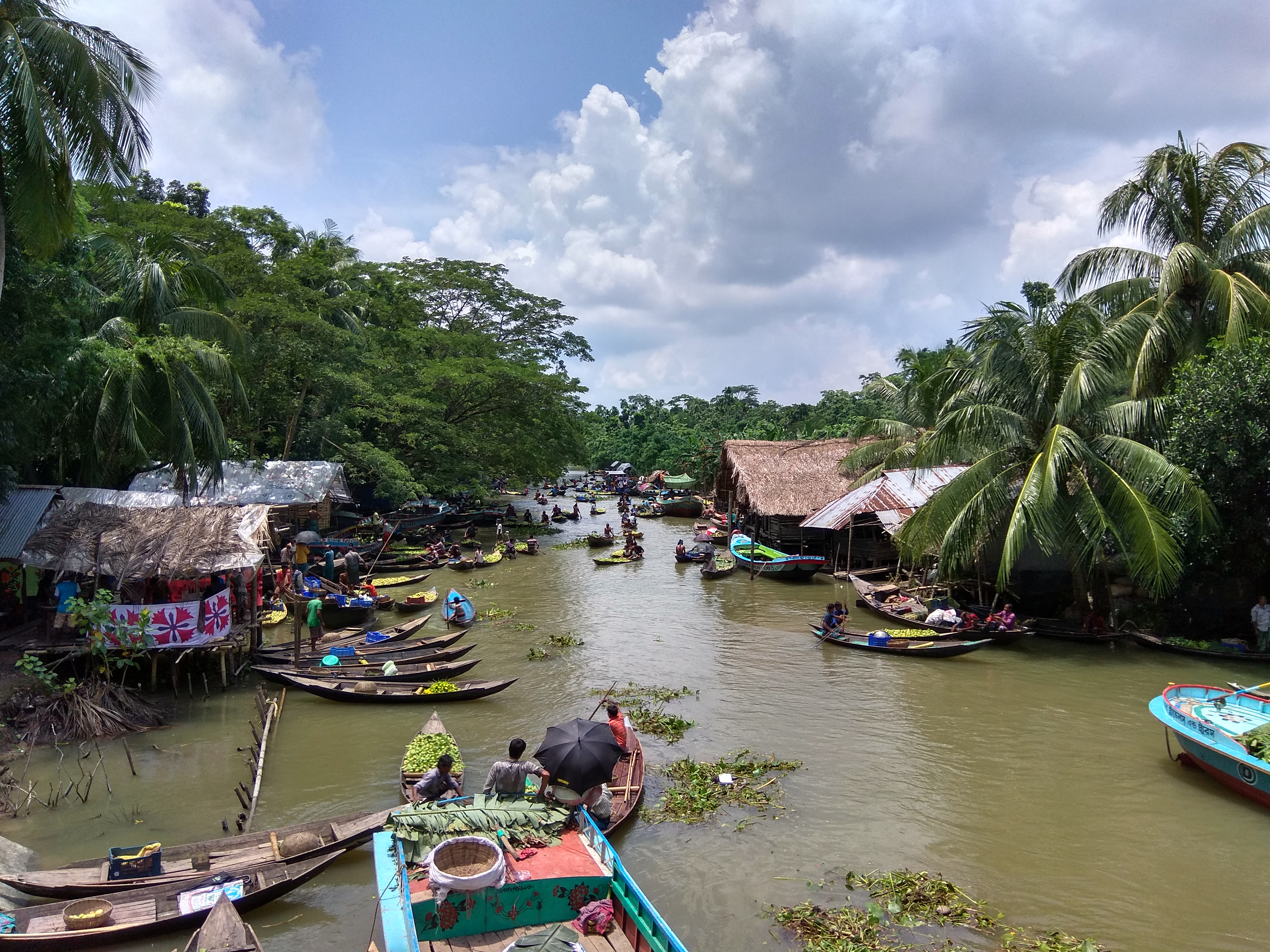
- Bhimruli Floating Guava Market

- Coordinates: 22°38.6′N 90°12′E
- Country: Bangladesh
- Division: Barisal
- District: Jhalokati
- Headquarters: Jhalokati

Area
  - Total: 159.46 km^{2} (61.57 sq mi)

Population (2022)
  - Total: 217,924
  - Density: 1,366.6/km^{2} (3,539.6/sq mi)
- Time zone: UTC+6 (BST)
- Postal code: 8400
- Area code: 0498
- Website: Sadar.gif Official Map of the Jhalakati Sadar Upazila

Jhalokati Sadar Upazila mauza geocode map

Jhalakathi Sadar (or Jhalokathi Sadar, Bengali: ঝালকাঠি সদর) is an upazila of Jhalokati District in Barisal Division, Bangladesh.

== Geography ==
Jhalakathi Sadar is located at 22.6431°N 90.2000°E. It has 36,504 households and a total area of 159.46 km^{2}.

== History ==
At the start of Mughal rule in the late 16th century, a Sufi saint originally from Iran known as Dawud Shah settled in the village of Sugandhia in Jhalkathi. At that time, the sardar of the village was Sraban Thakur. It is said that Shah took shelter in Thakur's home in the guise of a laborer. However, Thakur later realized Shah's karamat and both he and his wife converted to Islam and Thakur changed his name to Sraban Khan. A khanqah was then established by Sraban Khan in Sugandhia for Dawud Shah. Shah was known to have established three mosques. The first was built in Jhalokati port and remained active as late as 1967. The ruins of the mosque lie next to the Jhalokati Tablighi Masjid which was built as a replacement for this ancient mosque being destroyed. Dawud Shah also built two other mosques in Sutalari and Nalchity. The administrator of Gaur heard of Dawud Shah's activities and was very overwhelmed. After Dawud Shah's death, he sent white stones from Rajmahal and Rajasthan to Sugandhia for the building of his mausoleum. The mausoleum has the biggest Quranic typography of any mausoleum in Bangladesh. The Sardar family of Sugandhia continues to serve as the guardians of this mausoleum, and Alamat Khan (son of Sraban Khan) and Niamat Khan were buried next to Dawud Shah after their deaths. The emperor awarded them tax-free land as Cheragi Dawud Shah under Qismat Charamaddi in the Chandradwip pargana. The administrative division of Qismat Charamaddi (Char Ahmadi) was named after Alamat Khan's son Ahmad Khan. The guardianship was later transferred to the Khandaker family of Sugandhia during British rule.

During the 17th century, a Muslim missionary descended from Abu Bakr named Sheikh Shah Khudgir settled in the village of Rajpasha after spending some time in Faridpur where he built the Patbail and Paitledi mosques. He died in Rajpasha and his mazar (mausoleum) and the adjacent pond became an important site in the local area. The nearby Sheikherhat area was named after him and his descendants who are known as the Sheikh family of Rajpasha.

In the same century, Kirtinarayan Basu, the former Raja of Chandradwip, settled in Jhalkathi's Keora village after converting to Islam. He founded the Baklai family of Keora who possessed land in the Chandradwip and Salimabad parganas and particularly, taluqs in Mathbaria and Morrelganj. His son and successor, Mahmud Hasan Taqi, founded a mosque in Keora village. Taqi had three sons; Mahmud Ghazanfar Ali, Mahmud Sadeq and Ejaz Mahmud. Mahmud Sadeq's son was Qutb Mahmud, whose son was Jan Mahmud, whose son was Rahmat Ali Baklai, whose son was Mahmud Ali Baklai, whose son was Amud Ali Baklai, whose son was Ahmad Ali Balkai, whose son was Abdul Majid Baklai. In total, Kirtinarayan's descendants number over one thousand today.

== Demographics ==
Religions in Jhalokati Sadar Upazila (2022)
Religion	Percent
Islam	85.62%
Hinduism	14.35%
Other or not stated	0.03%

According to the 2022 Bangladeshi census, Jhalokathi Sadar Upazila had 53,467 households and a population of 217,924. 8.66% of the population were under 5 years of age. Jhalokathi Sadar had a literacy rate (age 7 and over) of 83.68%: 84.88% for males and 82.54% for females, and a sex ratio of 95.54 males for every 100 females. 77,005 (35.34%) lived in urban areas.

According to the 2011 Census of Bangladesh, Jhalokati Sadar Upazila had 50,315 households and a population of 216,348. 43,651 (20.18%) were under 10 years of age. Jhalokati Sadar had a literacy rate (age 7 and over) of 68.82%, compared to the national average of 51.8%, and a sex ratio of 1,051 females per 1,000 males. 54,904 (25.38%) lived in urban areas.

According to the 1991 Bangladesh census, Jhalakati Sadar had a population of 195,619. Males comprised 51.13% of the population, and females 48.87%. The population aged 18 or over was 102,890. Jhalakati Sadar had an average literacy rate of 54.4% (7+ years), compared to the national average of 32.4%.

== Economy ==
Between 1940 and 1975, Jhalakati was famous for the only automatic rice huller in the region owned by Shudhangshu Bhushan Das (Son of Aswini Kumar Das) and his two friends (Sons of former National Assembly Member Hazi Ghani Khan). It was a thriving complex built on an area approximately 2 square kilometer. The smoke from the chimney served as a navigation landmark by passing steamers while the factory siren could be heard from as far as Barisal. After the company declared bankruptcy shortly after the war. Shudhangshu descendants eventually migrated to India and other parts of Bangladesh while his partners had stayed back to establish their own ventures. The massive ruins of the factory can still be seen in the west Chandkati. The Das family lost its honour, assets and property due to the partition of India and Pakistan leading to dangerous military rule in East Pakistan (present-day Bangladesh) which initiated riots killing and displacing millions of Hindu Bengalis from their homes to seek refuge in India. Shudhangshu who inspired the name Shugandha River and industrial venture Shugandha that was founded by his two close friends shortly after the war. Ghani Khan's descendants now control the economy of the entire district till date. The District that once popular due to the existence of six aristocrat families (Das, Khan, Roy, Sardar, Mira, Chakrabortty) and their businesses, have now forgotten most of their contributions.

== Administration ==
Jhalakati Sadar Upazila is divided into Jhalakati Municipality and 10 union parishads: Basanda, Binoykati, Gabkhandhansiri, Gabharamchandrapur, Keora, Kirtipasha, Nabagram, Nathullabad, Ponabalia, and Sekherhat. The union parishads are subdivided into 158 mauzas and 190 villages.

Jhalakati Municipality is subdivided into 9 wards and 47 mahallas.

== Education ==
There are six colleges in the upazila. They include Aklima Moazzem Hossain College, Hemayet Uddin Degree College, Jhalakathi Government College, founded in 1964, Jhalakathi Government Women's College, Shah Mahmudia College, and Sher-E-Bangla Fazlul Haque College.

According to Banglapedia, Bowkathi Bindu Bashini High School, founded in 1918, Jhalokati Government Girls' School (1919), Jhalakathi Government High School (1872), Kirtipasa Prosanna Kumar Secondary School (1903), Nathullabad High School (1923), Udbodhan Secondary School (1940) and Taruli Secondary School (1957) are notable secondary schools.

The madrasa (religious seminary) education system includes three fazil and one kamil madrasas. According to Banglapedia, Sarengal Nesaria Honainia Fazil Madrasa, founded in 1974, is a notable Fazil madrasa.

== Notable residents ==
- Azizur Rahman Qayed, Islamic religious leader
- Amir Hossain Amu, Minister of Industries, has been the Member of Parliament for constituency Jhalokati-2 since 2009.
- A. K. Fazlul Huq, Prime Minister of Bengal (1937–1943) and Governor of East Pakistan (1956–1958), was born at Saturia in 1873.
- Golam Mustafa, actor
- Ziaul Ahsan,Controversial Military officer of Bangladesh Army
- Kirtinarayan Basu, Raja of Chandradwip who resettled in Jhalakathi after converting to Islam

== See also ==
- Upazilas of Bangladesh
- Districts of Bangladesh
- Divisions of Bangladesh
