= Boalia, Muladi =

Boalia বোয়ালিয়া
- Village
- Location in Bangladesh
- Coordinates: 23°0′N 90°22′E
- Country: Bangladesh
- Division: Barisal Division
- District: Barisal District
- Upazila: Muladi Upazila

Population (2022)
  - Total: 4,720
- Time zone: UTC+6 (Bangladesh Time)

Boalia is a village in Muladi Upazila of Barisal District in the Barisal Division of southern-central Bangladesh.

According to the 2022 Census of Bangladesh, Boalia had 1,168 households and a population of 4,720.
