= Karapur Miah Bari Mosque =

Mosque in Karapur, Barishal, Bangladesh

- কড়াপুর মিয়া বাড়ি মসজিদ
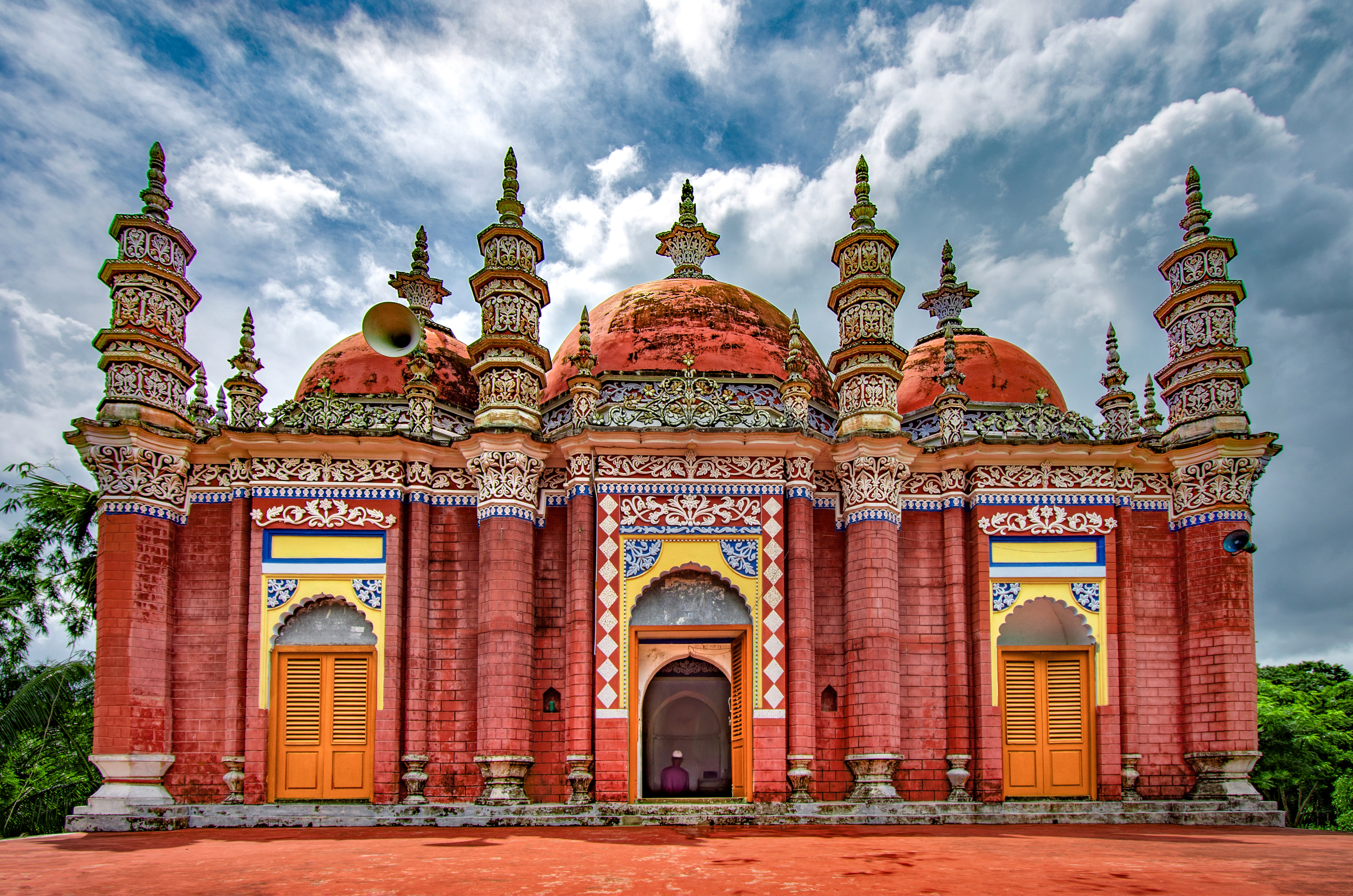

- Location of the mosque in Bangladesh

Religion
- Affiliation: Islam
- Ecclesiastical or organisational status: Mosque
- Status: Protected

Location
- Location: North Karapur, Barisal District
- Country: Bangladesh
- Administration: Department of Archaeology
- Coordinates: 22°43′27″N 90°17′20″E

Architecture
- Type: Mosque architecture
- Style: Mughal
- Founder: Hayat Mahmud
- Completed: 18th century

Specifications
- Dome: Three
- Minaret: Twenty

The Karapur Miah Bari Mosque (Bengali: কড়াপুর মিঞা বাড়ী মসজিদ) is a mosque located in Karapur, in the Barisal District of Bangladesh. The 18th-century three-domed mosque and archaeological site is located in the Miah Bari of North Karapur in Raipasha-Karapur Union, Barisal Sadar Upazila.

== History ==
According to local tradition, this Mughal style mosque was built in the 18th century by Hayat Mahmud, the zamindar of Buzurg-Umedpur Pargana. Mahmud was rebellious to the British government and exiled to Penang Island (formerly Prince of Wales Island) in Malaysia. His family was stripped of Umedpur's zamindarship. It was after Hayat's return to Bengal, sixteen years later, that he built the Miah Bari Mosque taking inspiration from the Kartalab Khan Mosque in Old Dhaka. However, some believe the mosque was built by his son, Mahmud Zahid. The mosque is under the protection of Bangladeshi Department of Archaeology.

== Architecture ==
It is a two-storied, typical Bengali Mughal type style mosque with six doors on the ground floor and three on the top floor. The space under the platform is currently used for madrasa. A 3.02-metre-wide (9.9 ft) flight of stairs leads to the platform where the rectangle shaped prayer hall is placed on the western side. It measures 13.49 by 6.1 metres (44.3 by 20.0 ft), while internally it has an oblong plan of 11.2 by 3.9 metres (37 by 13 ft), with a 1.05-metre (3.4 ft) thick surrounding plastered brick wall. The whole length of the rectangular hall is divided into three unequal bays using two arches emerging from the east and west walls. The square central bay is transformed into an octagonal area by using brick pendentives. Three small sized, fluted, bulbous domes are placed on the octagonal corners, and the central dome is larger than the other two. The domes have an octagonal shoulder and are crowned with elongated finials.

The eastern façade of the prayer hall has three openings; each of the openings is bounded by a slender engaged turret and the openings have a cusped arch on the outside surface. The mosque has three domes and eight large minarets, four on the front wall and four on the back wall. In addition, there are 12 smaller minarets in the space between the front and back walls. The upper part of the north, south and west walls' outer wall surfaces is profusely ornamented in plaster.

The floral relief has white surface coating and the recessed surface is painted in blue. The four corner turrets, one at each corner and two additional turrets on the front and back façades are octagonal in shape which extend high above the roof level with their plastered blind kiosk divided by three eaves and ended in a small cupola with an amla kalasha typed finial.

== Gallery ==
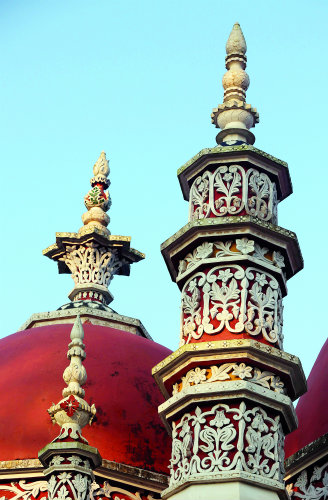
Minaret

== See also ==
- Islam in Bangladesh
- List of mosques in Bangladesh
- List of archaeological sites in Bangladesh
