= Mughal conquest of Bakla =

Mughal conquest of Barisal in the 17th century

Conquest of Bakla
- Part of Mughal conquest of Bengal
Date	December 1611
Location	Chandradwip
Result	Mughal victory
Territorial changes	Chandradwip Kingdom formally annexed to Mughal Empire

Belligerents
Mughal Empire	Chandradwip Kingdom

Commanders and leaders
Islam Khan I Syed Hakim; Syed Kasu; Mirza Nuruddin; Islam Quli; Ulfat Ghazi	Ramchandra Basu; Jiban Krishna Roy; Ram Mohan Mal

Strength
Large fleet 3,000 infantry 20 elephants	Unknown

The Mughal conquest of Bakla was a military campaign by the Mughal Empire against the Chandradwip Kingdom, which covered much of the present-day Barisal Division of Bangladesh. The campaign was led by Syed Hakim, under the orders of Islam Khan I, against Raja Ramchandra Basu.

== Background ==
The Barisal region was historically known as Bakla and much of it was ruled by the Chandradwip Kingdom, an independent line of Hindu kings who enjoyed autonomy under the Sultanate of Bengal. The Mughal Empire defeated the Sultanate at the Battle of Rajmahal on 12 July 1576, formally establishing the Bengal as the easternmost province of the subcontinent-wide empire. However, the collapse of the Sultanate led to the formation of the Baro-Bhuiyans; a loose confederacy of independent chieftains across Bengal who continued to challenge Mughal domination.

During the reign of Emperor Akbar, Raja Man Singh I (1594–1606) was the appointed Subahdar of Bengal and responsible for warding off rebellious chieftains in the region. The Chandradwip Kingdom was then under the rule of Raja Kandarpa Narayan Basu. Kandarpa agreed to form an alliance with Singh and the Mughals. Kandarpa's son and successor Raja Ramchandra Basu broke this agreement in 1602, declaring Bakla's independence, just like Masnad-i-Ala Musa Khan of Sonargaon. Ramchandra was among the Baro-Bhuiyans of Bengal and was a close ally and son-in-law of Raja Pratapaditya of Jessore. His mother was against the idea of him breaking the agreement of his father and did not support warring with the Mughals. However, Ramchandra's Brahmin ministers publicly expressed their support to the resistance.

== Campaign ==
In 1608, Emperor Jahangir appointed Islam Khan Chishti as the Subahdar of Bengal, who continued his predecessors' campaigns to subdue the Baro-Bhuiyans and completely annex all of Bengal to the Mughal Empire. He sent a letter to Ramchandra, requesting him to surrender and recognise Mughal subordination. Ramchandra rejected the letter and teamed up with Pratapaditya to develop a large army consisting of thousands of Bengalis and Afghans who were opposed to Mughal rule.

In December 1611, Islam Khan dispatched two forces to South Bengal, one against Raja Pratapaditya of Jessore and the other against Raja Ramchandra of Bakla. He entrusted Syed Hakim with the command of a large army for the Bakla campaign. This was so that the two Rajas could not come to each other's aid as each would be busy in their own battles. Hakim was joined by leading Mughal generals of Bengal including Syed Kasu, Mirza Nuruddin, Islam Quli and Raja Satrajit. Along with a large fleet, the army consisted of 3000 infantry armed with matchlocks and 20 renowned elephants. The Brahmin ministers of Chandradwip advised Ramchandra to build forts opposite the Mughal forts to which he did so in Haludpur, Narayanpur, Kashipur, Nathullabad, Kagashura and Khudrakathi. Ramchandra appointed Jiban Krishna Roy as his naval chief and had hundreds of arks and boats constructed for his navy. The naval battle took place in the river around Shayestabad, Barisal town and Jahapur.

Chandradwip had 100,000 soldiers fighting in total. João Geri, the army commander of his Portuguese allies, led 10,000 soldiers armed with heavy cannons and guns to assist Chandradwip. They were also joined by Nana Fernandes as well as the Dutch. The Chandradwip navy were prepared with their cannons on the banks of the river between Shujabad and Khudrakathi. The land battle took place in a village now referred to as Sangram which is close to Khudrakathi and Khanpura in Babuganj Upazila. The Mughals fought with Chandradwip and its allies for roughly a week, before they successfully entered Ramchandra's forts. The Baharistan-i-Ghaibi mentions how Ramchandra's mother wished to poison herself to show her disapproval of Ramchandra's activities. Ramchandra then arrived in front of the Mughals, and kissed the feet of his enemies as a symbol of the surrender of his naval forces. The incident was reported to Islam Khan I who ordered the Mughals to now join the forces at Jessore, and entrusted the surveillance of Ramchandra to Raja Satrajit of Bhusna for the remainder of the campaign.

== Aftermath ==
Ramchandra was later brought by Raja Satrajit to Subahdar Islam Khan I in Jahangir Nagar. As a result of the surrender of his navy, the Subahdar reorganised Bakla, allowing Ramchandra to remain as a zamindar but assigning portions of Bakla to various jagirdars and karoris who participated in the conquest. Bakla was established as a sarkar of the Bengal Subah, and Syed Hakim and his brothers were appointed as its governors. Emperor Jahangir awarded parts of Chandradwip to Ulfat Ghazi for his participation in the campaign, and these areas became the Nazirpur pargana of Bakla. Ghazi became the founder of the Miah family of Nalchira and his descendants continued to hold influential positions in the history of Barisal for several centuries.

In present times, local Bengalis holding the surnames of Dhali, Mal and Paik are identified as descendants of members of Ramchandra's army. Surname Khan then appeared to Muslim Bengalis who were identified as descendants of members of Islam Khan's Army.

== See also ==
- Kirtinarayan Basu, Ramchandra's son and successor
- Sabi Khan, faujdar of Bakla
