= Muladi Municipality =

Municipality in Barisal, Bangladesh

Muladi Municipality মুলাদী পৌরসভা
- Municipality
- Interactive map of Muladi Municipality

Area
  - Total: 5.90 km^{2} (2.28 sq mi)

Population
  - Total: 25,525
  - Density: 4,317.79/km^{2} (11,183.0/sq mi)

Muladi Municipality (Bengali: মুলাদী পৌরসভা, lit. 'Muladi Municipality') is a municipality in Muladi, Barisal, Bangladesh, it has a total area of 5.90 square kilometers and a population of 25,525.

== History ==
Muladi Municipality was established on 25 January 2001.

== Administration ==
9 mouzas and 15 villages are under Muladi Municipality.
