= Basudeb DasSarma =

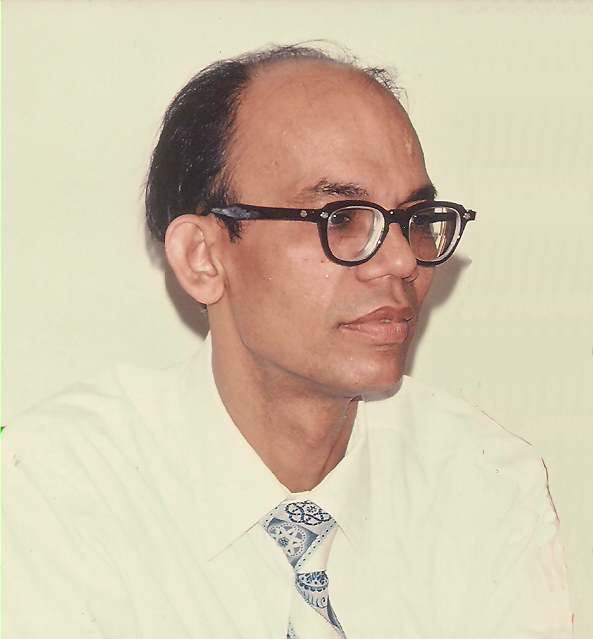
- Born: 1 January 1923; Barisal, India
- Died: 16 November 2007 (aged 84); Charleston, West Virginia, U.S.
- Spouse(s): Seba Sen, (author of Tales from a Faraway Land, Indian Children's Stories)
- Scientific career
- Fields: Inorganic Chemistry; Environmental chemistry

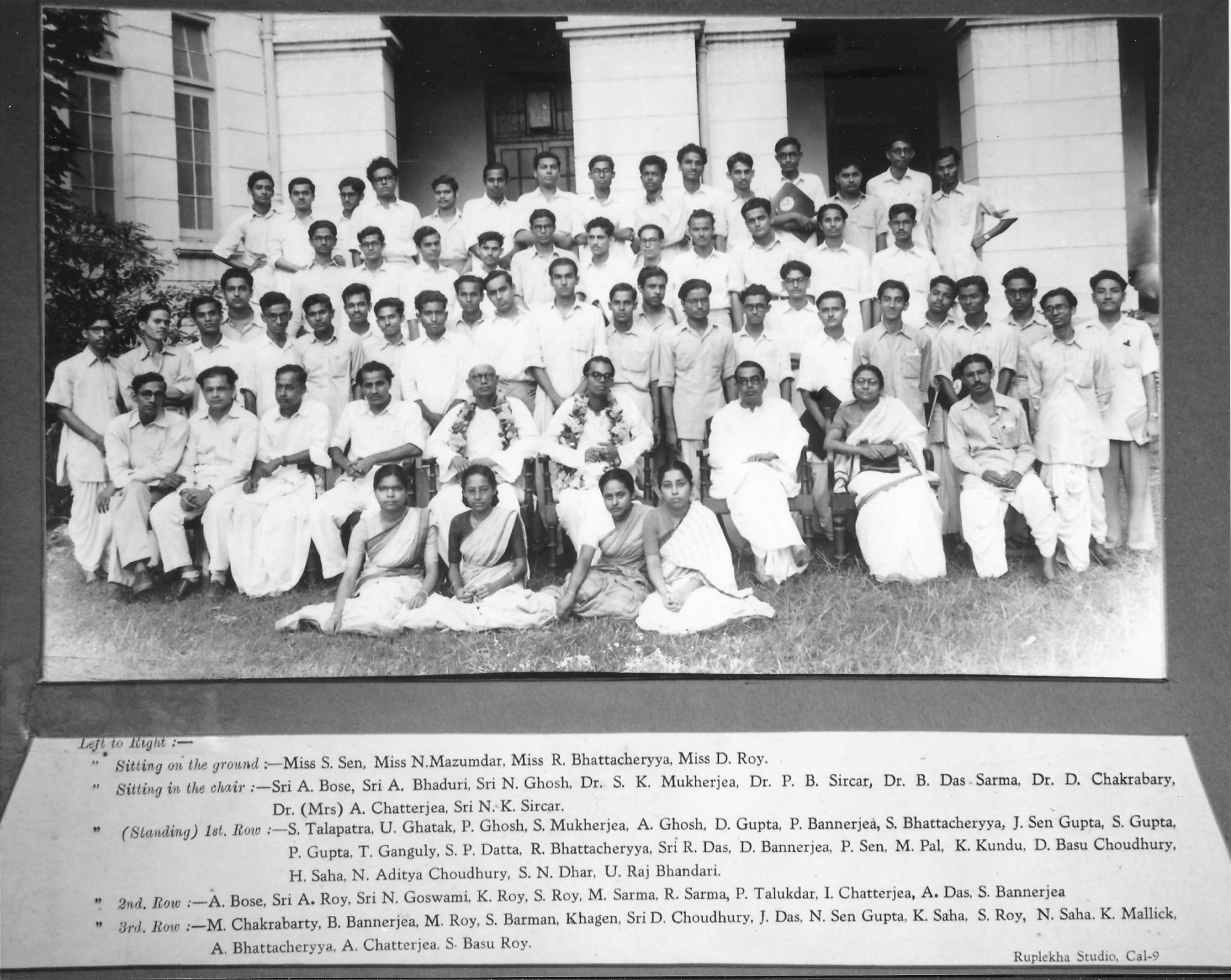
Basudeb DasSarma with P. B. Sarkar, Chairman of the Department of Chemistry, and other members of the University of Calcutta. Photograph taken on the eve of DasSarma's departure for the University of Illinois, Urbana-Champaign, USA in October 1953.

Basudeb DasSarma (1 January 1923 – 16 November 2007) was a chemist and faculty at the University College of Science and Technology of the University of Calcutta. He was among an early group of Indian scholars and professionals to emigrate to the US. He did groundbreaking research with John C. Bailar Jr. at the University of Illinois Urbana-Champaign, won an American Chemical Society award in 1971 for his contributions to the understanding of coordination and stereo-chemistry of metal complexes, and became a naturalized US citizen in 1972. He was a professor of chemistry at West Virginia State College from 1966 to 1992, President of the West Virginia Academy of Science, 1981–82, and a community leader and spokesman on environmental issues in the Kanawha Valley around Charleston, West Virginia. He died on 16 November 2007.

== Life and career ==
=== Early life and education ===
Basudeb DasSarma was born in Barisal in East Bengal now Bangladesh on early January 1923. His parents were Ashutosh DasSarma, an ayurvedic physician (kaviraj) and an active Indian independence movement activist and Surabala DasSarma. He started his education at the early age of 4. His first lessons were the Bengali alphabet and was taught by his father. Later on his sister became his instructor. Basudeb started his first public schooling at the age of 11 in grade 4 at Jhalokati Government Boys High School. After receiving high scores in high school, Basudeb became a student in Bachelor of Science in Brojomohun College (1940-1944). Since Basudeb was facing financial difficulties, he had to take private tuition to afford his housing rent during his college life. After Bachelors Basudeb completed his Master of Science (1944-1946) and Doctor of Philosophy in University College of Science, Technology & Agriculture under the University of Calcutta.

=== Career ===
After completing his Doctor of Philosophy Basudeb started his career as a lecturer in chemistry in University of Calcutta (1950-1953). From 1953-1955 he worked as a research associate in the University of Illinois at Urbana–Champaign with professor of Inorganic Chemistry John C. Bailar Jr. The research was about learning more about coordination and stereo-chemistry of metal complexes. After this he came back and served as a lecturer in the University of Calcutta for 2 more years from 1955-1957. While teaching in the University of Calcutta he got the opportunity to work as the chief chemist at the Geological Survey of India and left his job at the University of Calcutta. In 1966 Basudeb migrated to United States with his family and joined the West Virginia State University as a professor in chemistry. He retired from the West Virginia State University in the year 1991 and remained as a professor emerita until 1992. Basudeb also served as research chemist for Union Carbide since 1966. From 1971-1972 Basudeb served as the Certified Research Administrator in the Oak Ridge National Laboratory. In 1988 he also served as the Project manager in National Institute of Chemical Studies.

=== Major accomplishments ===
- He won the American Chemical Society Award in 1971 for his research and publications on coordination and stereo-chemistry of metal complexes.
- He won the West Virginia State University's Outstanding Faculty Member of the Year award in 1973.
