= Chandradwip =

Medieval principality in Barisal

Coordinates: 22.818°N 90.122°E

Chandradwip চন্দ্রদ্বীপ রাজ্য (Bengali)
- 1280–1799
- Capital: Govindapur; Kachua; Madhabpasha
- Languages: Sanskrit, Bengali
- Religion: Hinduism; Islam (briefly)
- Government: Monarchy
- Raja
  - 1416: Danujamarddana Deva
  - 1598-1611: Ramchandra Basu (last)
- Zamindar
  - 1777-1799: Jayanarayana (last)
- Historical era: Early modern
  - Established: 1280
  - Disestablished: 1799
Preceded by	Succeeded by
Bengal Sultanate	Bengal Subah; Bengal Presidency
- Today part of: Bangladesh

Chandradwip (Bengali: চন্দ্রদ্বীপ), later known as the Madhabpasha Zamindari (Bengali: মাধবপাশা জমিদারী), was a historical principality and later a feudal estate located in South Bengal, largely corresponding to the present-day Barisal Division in Bangladesh.

The principality rose to prominence after the rule of Raja Danujamarddana of the Deva dynasty based in Bikrampur. He was "the last known Hindu king of eastern Bengal", having control over southern Bengal in the 13th century and reaching as far as Chittagong. Chandradwip was known for maintaining a degree of autonomy whilst navigating relationships with larger entities such as the Sultanate of Bengal. Following the Mughal conquest of Bakla in 1611, the authority of Chandradwip’s rulers gradually diminished, and they were progressively reduced to the status of zamindars. Their privileges and territorial control further declined with the establishment of British colonial rule in Bengal Presidency, with the zamindari being officially auctioned in 1799 due to unpaid revenue. A few years after the independence of Pakistan, the final nominal Raja of Chandradwip, Satindra Narayan, relocated to Calcutta.

== History ==
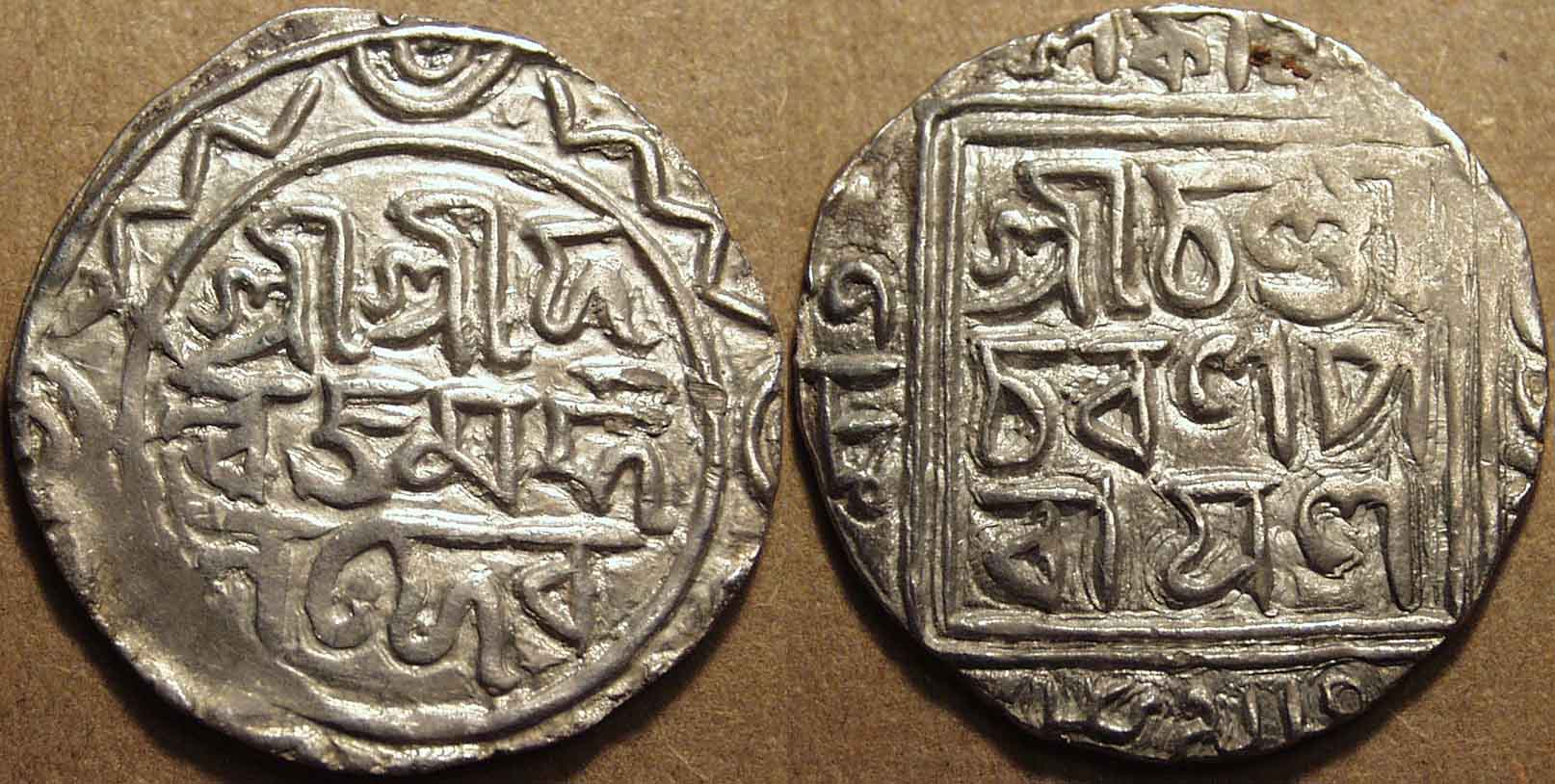
Silver tanka of Danujamarddana issued at Chatigram (Chittagong) in the year Saka 1339 (= 1417 CE). Legends are in letters of medieval Bengali; obverse: sri sri danujamarddana deva, reverse: sri chandi charana parayana.

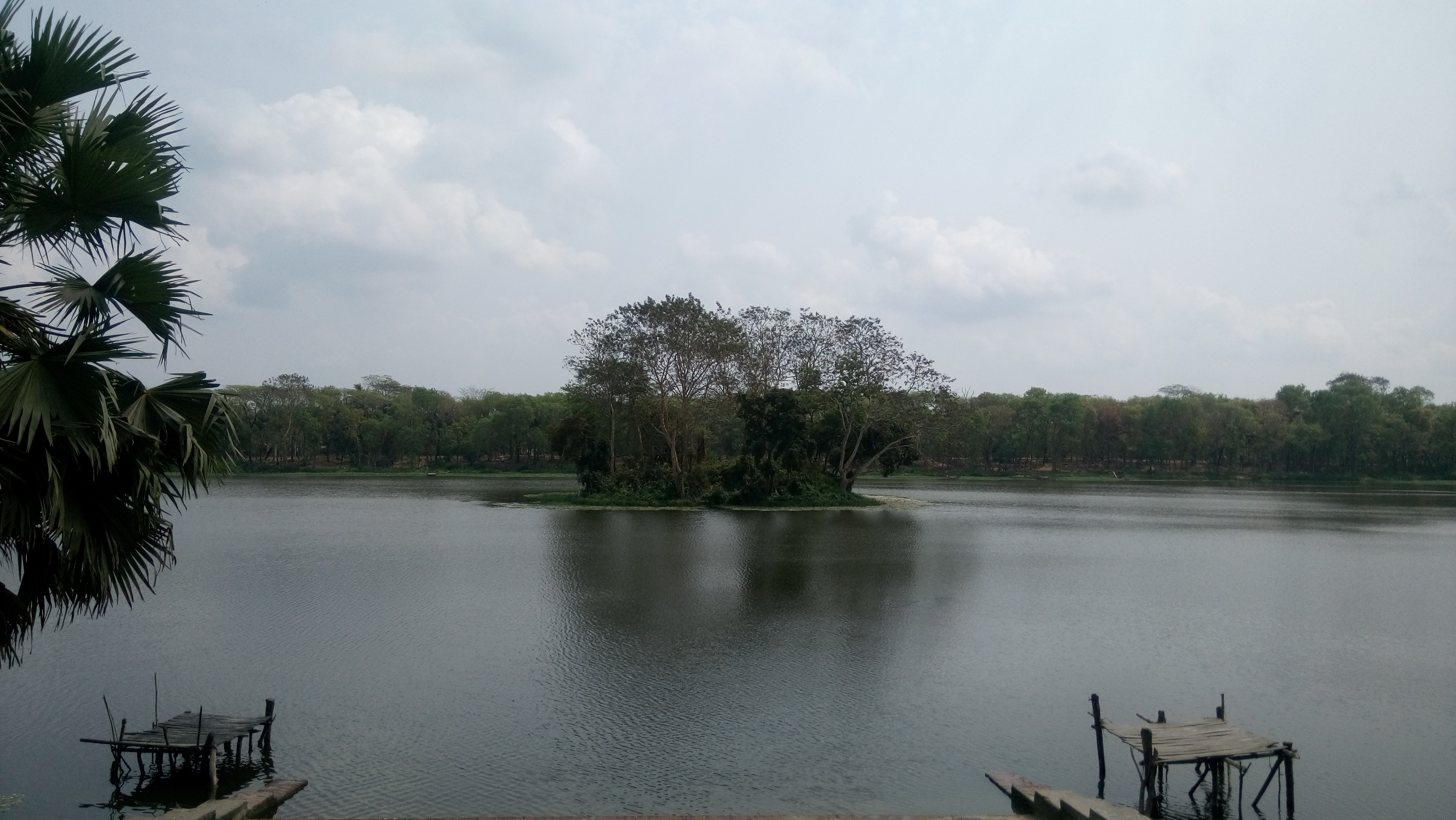
The Durga Sagar was excavated by Raja Shiv Narayan in 1780 and named after his wife Rani Durgabati.

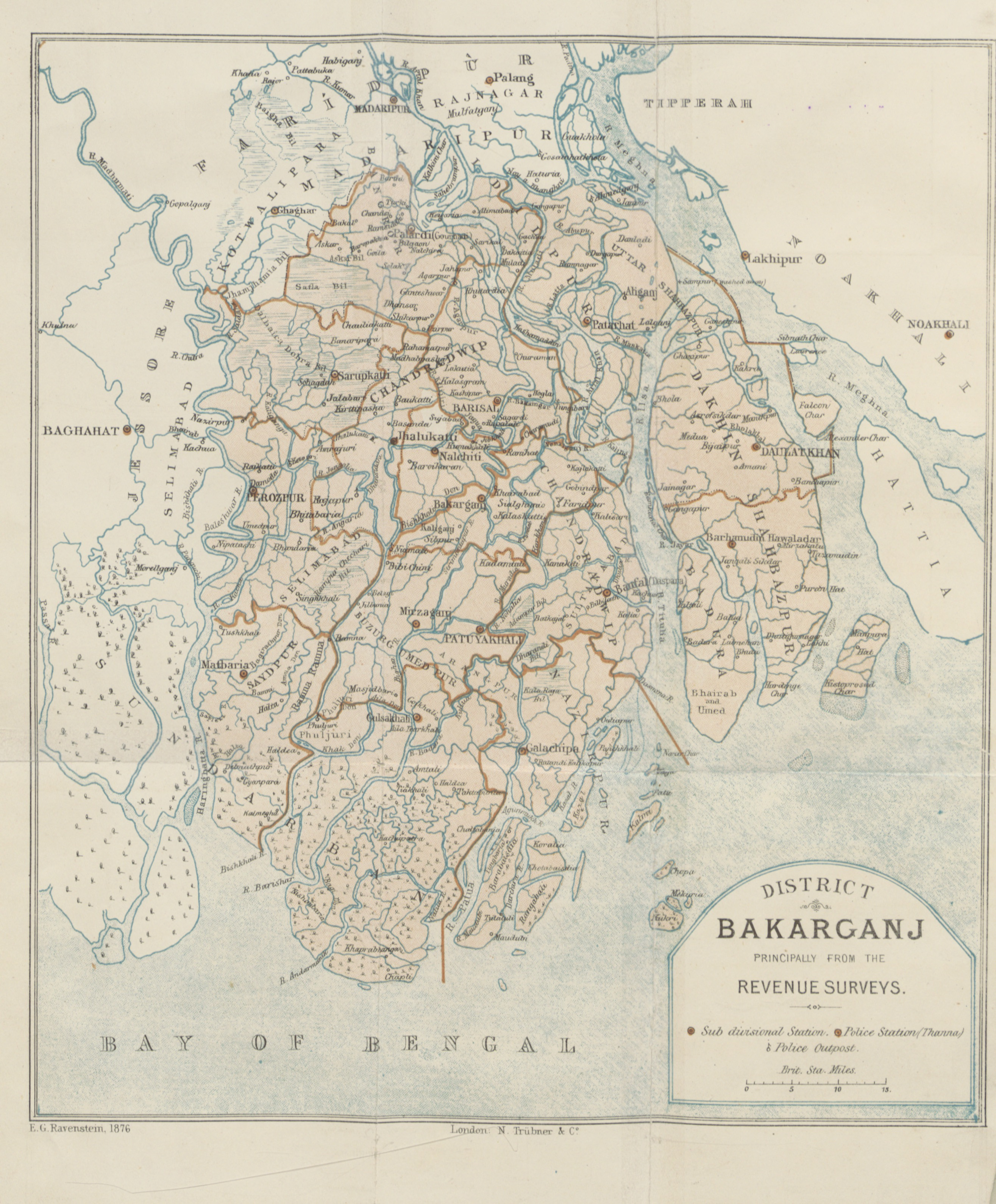
Map of the Bákarganj District, including areas contained within the Pargana Chandradwip.

The history of Chandradwip goes back to the era of Chandra Period.

Chandradwip was successively ruled by the Mauryas, Guptas and the Palas. Towards the end of the 10th century A.D., this region was occupied by Traillokyachandra from the Chandra Dynasty. Many Chinese and European travellers left accounts about this principality. The Temple of Tara was situated near the seashore. It was visible from the sea. According to Banglapedia, Chandragomin, the sixth-century grammarian, is assumed to have written his hymns on Tara here. In a manuscript of 1015 A.D., the Tara-Temple was mentioned.

=== Deva dynasty ===
The Chandras were succeeded by the Deva Dynasty of Bikrampur. Danauja Rai was an independent Kayastha king who ruled in eastern Bengal, with his capital initially at Vikramapura and later at Suvarnagrama. He is widely identified as the progenitor of the Deva dynasty, which issued coins and ruled over eastern parts of the former Sena Empire, including Chandradwip. In 1282, he entered into an agreement with Sultan Balban of Delhi to cooperate in his campaign against Tughral Tughan Khan. After a brief period of confusion, the Deva Dynasty occupied this region and established their capital at Kachua. They were followed by the Basu and Mitra Majumdar families. The kingdom was a vassal state of the Sultanate of Bengal up until the fall of the Hussain Shahi dynasty in 1538.

Chandradwip emerged as a center of the elite Kayastha and Brahmin communities during the reign of Raja Ramaballav. Under his grandson, Raja Hariballav, the kingdom witnessed a notable social reform when he abolished the traditional practice of dowry among the Kayasthas, permitting only a nominal gift based on the social status and dignity of the bride and groom. During the reigns of Krishnaballav and Hariballav, the region saw the arrival of Muslim merchants and traders, who began introducing Islam to the local population.

Raja Jaideva who ruled afterwards established diplomatic relations with the Sultanate of Bengal, officially marking Chandradwip’s status as a vassal state. As he had no sons, his daughter Kamala succeeded him. Queen Kamala and her sister Vidyasundari undertook significant public works, including the excavation of lakes and ponds to address the shortage of potable water in the Bakla region. One of the most notable projects was the creation of a large pond, later associated with a legendary account of her self-sacrifice, which became a part of local Barisailla oral tradition. The pond, known as Kamala Ranir Dighi, symbolises both her dedication to her subjects and the Bengali folklore surrounding her tragic death.

=== Basu dynasty ===
Paramananda Basu, educated in Sanskrit and Bengali and trained in governance from a young age, ascended to the throne around 1520 as the first Raja from the Basu dynasty of Chandradwip. During his reign, he hosted the prominent Gaudiya Vaishnavite preacher Chaitanya Mahaprabhu of Sylhet in 1527. Paramananda’s rule also coincided with the first arrival of Portuguese merchants in the region. In 1559, after their defeat in Chittagong, the Portuguese sought Paramananda’s support, offering trade privileges and military assistance in exchange for access to the port of Bakla. A formal treaty of friendship and trade was concluded on 30 April 1559, establishing Chandradwip as an important commercial hub.

Under Raja Ramchandra Basu, it became a part of the Baro-Bhuiyan confederacy of independent chieftains until its formal defeat to the Mughal Empire during the Conquest of Bakla in 1611. From then, it began functioning as a zamindari and the region continued to be known as Bakla-Chandradwip until the time of Agha Baqer Khan. In 1799, the Chandradwip zamindari was auctioned off a few years after the Permanent Settlement had come into force.

In c. 1570, Raja Jagadananda Basu ascended the throne. His reign coincided with the rise of the Baro-Bhuiyan confederacy, an alliance of independent Bengali and Afghan chieftains resisting the Mughal conquest of Bengal. Chandradwip likely joined this confederacy under Jagadananda’s leadership. He was succeeded in 1584 by his son Raja Kandarpa Narayan, under whom the prosperity of Chandradwip reached its zenith. Kandarpanarayan forged a treaty of friendship with Raja Pratapaditya of Jessore, aimed at expelling the Magh pirates from the southern coastal regions. Pratapaditya assisted him with soldiers and weapons, and in 1590, he visited Chandradwip to formalize the marriage between Kandarpa’s son, Ramchandra Basu, and his daughter, Bimala who was 4 years old. However, Kandarpa Narayan later signed a treaty with Mughal Subahdar Man Singh I, effectively recognizing Mughal suzerainty and withdrawing himself from the alliance. This decision brought him into conflict with the Afghans who had fled east after their defeat by the Mughals and settled in Barisailla villages such as Mukkarkathi, Lakhutia, Rahmatpur, and Qasbah. When Kandarpa imposed additional taxes on them, they demanded ordinary taxation and urged him to rejoin the resistance. Kandarpa’s refusal and his enforcement of the Mughal treaty led to their expulsion and the establishment of an Afghan rebel base at Hossainpur. The ensuing Battle of Hossainpur saw Kandarpa Narayan launch a campaign against the Afghan settlers. After fierce fighting across the villages of Daharpara and Ghazipara, many were killed, and the remaining Afghans fled the Bakla region altogether. Kandarpa himself was seriously wounded in battle and later died of his injuries in 1598 at the royal palace in Mukkarkathi. The English traveller Ralph Fitch visited Baklanagar that same year and recorded detailed observations of Chandradwip and its ruler Kandarpanarayan, attesting to its wealth and renown.

Kandarpa Narayan was succeeded in 1598 by his son, Raja Ramchandra Basu, who was then eight years old. Fulfilling his father’s wishes, he began constructing a new capital at Hossainpur, where he excavated a large reservoir, built a temple dedicated to the Goddess of Death Kali, and fortified the site with moats and earthworks. As part of his Kulinist policy, he sought to purify the social order of the capital by expelling Muslims and Namasudras while settling elite Brahmins, Kayasthas, and Baidyas, renaming the city Ramchandrapur in his honor. After several years, Ramchandra relocated the capital to Srinagar Madhabpasha by combining nearby settlements including Badla, Baraikhali, Madhabpasha, Pangsha, and Pratappur. He undertook extensive public works, constructing a canal and building wooden forts. In 1599, the Mughal qanungoh Jumman Khan visited Chandradwip to assess revenue on behalf of the empire. He was cordially received by Ramchandra, whom he praised for his generosity and administrative ability. The same year, Ramchandra welcomed Christian missionaries such as Melchior Fonseca, permitting them to establish a church in Bakla and providing financial support for their travels. Not long after, Ramchandra rejoined the resistance against the Mughals and recruited a mercenary army composed of Bihari and Odia soldiers, known as the Baksaris. In 1602, his marriage to Princess Bimala of Jessore was consummated. This was a celebrated event that later inspired the Nobel Prize Laureate Rabindranath Tagore’s novella Bou Thakuranir Haat. Ramchandra's reign was marked by prosperity through the export of cloth and salt, though his kingdom frequently faced raids by Magh and Portuguese pirates, whom he repeatedly repelled. A long-standing rivalry with Raja Lakshman Manikya of Bhulua Kingdom (Noakhali) led to a notable military campaign supported by Portuguese troops. In 1611, the Mughal Subahdar Islam Khan Chishti launched the Conquest of Bakla. Ramchandra’s forces were eventually defeated, and he was captured and taken to Jahangir Nagar. His kingdom was annexed and divided among Mughal supporters like Ulfat Ghazi, though Ramchandra was kindly permitted to retain much of Chandradwip as a zamindar under imperial authority, marking the end of Chandradwip’s autonomy.

Raja Kirtinarayan Basu succeeded his father Ramchandra and was immediately met by a rebellion led by Chandradwip's Portuguese military commander, João Geri and his 10,000 soldiers. He quelled the rebellion at Ballabhpur with the remnants of the army within three days and Geri fled from the Bakla region. Following the conflict, Kirtinarayan began a programme of reorganising the army and establishing several forts and moats in Bakla, and also established over eight schools in the Bakla region. He also began to focus on improving relations with the Mughal Empire, and so he expressed his support to the Mughal governor Shaista Khan in his campaign to subdue Portuguese and Magh pirates in the Bay of Bengal. On one occasion, Raja Kirtinarayan Basu was invited by Subahdar Shaista Khan to his court in Jahangir Nagar to discuss military tactics against the piracy problem where he converted to Islam. His conversion led to social alienation and the Chandradwip zamindari was thereafter passed on to his younger brother Raja Basudev Narayan Basu, with Kirtinarayan remaining a Mughal commander and local taluqdar.

In 1688, Basudev's son Raja Pratap Narayan Basu became zamindar of Chandradwip. His reign was marked by instability, as the region was repeatedly looted and plundered by pirates, and the Raja mounted little resistance. Following his death, his son Prem Narayan Basu succeeded him, ruling only briefly before his untimely death, which brought the Basu dynasty to an end.

=== Mitra dynasty ===
This began with Uday Narayan Mitra in 1723, whose father had married Bimala, daughter of Raja Pratap Narayan Basu. He was briefly deposed by the Majumdar brothers of Shayestabad, Mehdi Majumdar and Sharafuddin Majumdar, due to withholding revenue. Mitra was eventually reinstated by Agha Baqer Khan and his tenure became notable for extensive temple construction and the promotion of local industries. Skilled Barisailla weavers from Madhabpasha and Wazirpur produced fine textiles, including muslin, which were exported widely, and paper production also flourished in the villages of Madhabpasha and Pangsha. His son, Raja Shivnarayan Mitra (1768–1777), suffered from insanity, promiscuity and indulgent behavior, which led to violent and destructive acts. In 1770, his wife, Durgabati, assumed administrative control to maintain order. Shivnarayan’s prolonged illness and eventual death in 1777 left Durgabati as regent for their son, Joy Narayan Mitra. She faced a treasury deficit of 7 lakh taka and widespread corruption, particularly by Dewan Shivshankar, who embezzled funds and further destabilized the administration. In September of 1779, Durgabati and her son lodged a formal complaint with the East India Company, accusing the Faujdar of Bakla (Barisal) Bakhsh Ali of impeding the smooth administration of the Madhabpasha estate. However, this very grievance, far from bringing any alleviation, only served to exacerbate Jayanarayana's predicament, culminating in the catastrophic consequence of his estate being seized and auctioned off by the Company, leaving the family with much less.

== In popular culture ==
Rabindranath Tagore wrote Bou Thakuranir Haath, a book about the Basu Maharani of Chandradwip which was later filmed as Bou Thakuranir Haat.

== List of Rajas ==
=== Rulers ===
Titular name	Reign	Officers	Notes
Deva dynasty (1280-1500)
Rājā (Rāmanātha) Danujamarddana Deva راجہ (رام ناتھ) دنج مردن دیو রাজা রামনাথ দনুজমর্দন দেব	1280-1330		
Rājā Mahendra Deva راجہ مہیندر دیو রাজা মহেন্দ্র দেব	1330		Son of Danujamarddana
Rājā Ramābhallava Deva راجہ رما بھلّو دیو রাজা রমাবল্লভ দেব	1330-1380		Son of Danujamarddana
Rājā Krishnabhallava Deva راجہ کرشن بھلو دیو রাজা কৃষ্ণবল্লভ দেব	1380-1420		Son of Ramābhallava
Rājā Haribhallava Deva راجہ ہربھلو دیو রাজা হরিবল্লভ দেব	1420-1460		Son of Krishnabhallava
Rājā Jaideva راجہ جیدیو রাজা জয়দেব	1460-1490		Son of Haribhallava
Rānī Kamalā رانی کملا রাণী কমলা	1490-1500		Married to Valabhadra Basu of Dehagati
Basu dynasty (1500-1611)
Rājā Paramānanda Basu راجہ پرم انند وسو রাজা পরমানন্দ বসু	1500-1570	Niamat Khan and Kanu Bishwas	Born in 1497, his father's regency lasted until 1520.
Rājā Jagadānanda Basu راجہ جگد انند وسو রাজা জগদানন্দ বসু	1570–1584		Son of Paramānanda
Rājā Kandarpanārāyaṇa Basu راجہ کندرپ نارایں وسو রাজা কন্দর্পনারায়ণ বসু	1584-1598	Raghunanda Faujdar, Sarai Acharya, Ram Mohan Mal	Son of Jagadānanda
Rājā Rāmchandra Basu راجہ رام چندر وسو রাজা রামচন্দ্র বসু	1598-1611	Raghunanda Faujdar, Ram Mohan Mal	Son of Kandarpanārāyaṇa and son-in-law of Rājā Pratapaditya of Jessore.

=== Zamindars ===
Titular name	Reign	Officers	Notes
Basu dynasty (1611-1723)
Rājā Rāmchandra Basu راجہ رام چندر وسو রাজা রামচন্দ্র বসু	1611-1668		Defeated at the Conquest of Bakla (1611) and reduced to the zamindar of Pargana Chandradwip.
Rājā Kīrtinārāyaṇa Basu راجہ کیرتی نارایں وسو রাজা কীর্তিনারায়ণ বসু	1668-1670s		Son of Rāmchandra. Converted to Islam and became the progenitor of the Baklai family of Muslim Taluqdars.
Rājā Bāsudeva Nārāyaṇa Basu راجہ واسو دیو نارایں وسو রাজা বাসুদেব নারায়ণ বসু	1670s-1688		Son of Rāmchandra.
Rājā Pratāpanārāyaṇa Basu راجہ پرتاپ نارایں وسو রাজা প্রতাপনারায়ণ বসু	1688–1723	Ramnarayan Chakraborti	Son of Bāsudeva.
Rājā Premanārāyaṇa Basu راجہ پریم نارایں وسو রাজা প্রেমনারায়ণ বসু	1723		Son of Pratāpanārāyaṇa.
Mitra dynasty (1723-1799)
Rājā Udayanārāyaṇa Mitra راجہ ادے نارایں متر রাজা উদয়নারায়ণ মিত্র	1723-1768		Son of Gaurīcharaṇa Mitra of Ulail and Vimalā, the daughter of Rājā Pratāpanārāyaṇa
Rājā Shivanarāyaṇa Mitra راجہ شیو نارایں متر রাজা শিবনারায়ণ মিত্র	1768–1777	Ramjiban Chakravarti	Son of Udayanārāyaṇa. Married to Durgāvatī, who served as the regent from 1770 to 1777 due to his insanity.
Rājā Lakshmī Narāyaṇa راجہ لکشمی نارایں রাজা লক্ষ্মীনারায়ণ	1777		Son of Shivanarāyaṇa. Ruled for a few days.
Rājā Jaya Narāyaṇa (Durgākroṛa) راجہ جے نارایں (درگاکروڑ) রাজা জযনারায়ণ (দুর্গাক্রোড়)	1777-1799	Hayat Mahmud	Son of Shivanarāyaṇa. His mother Durgāvatī served as a regent until his coming of age. The Chandradwip zamindari was officially auctioned in 1799 because of unpaid revenue as a result of embezzlement and mismanagement.

== See also ==
- Hayat Mahmud, military commander for the Raja of Chandradwip
