= Dasharathadeva =

Last Hindu king of East Bengal

Raja Dasarathadeva Danujmadhava, also known as Raja Danuaja Ray, was the last known Bengali Hindu king of East Bengal. He was the king of Chandradvipa (present-day Barisal).

== History ==
His ruling kingdom was near the neighborhood of Sonargaon between 1260 and 1268 CE. He later attacked Vikrampur and conquered Sena dynasty before 1280 CE.

== See also ==
- List of rulers of Bengal
- Deva dynasty
- History of Bengal
