= Syed Hakim =

Mughal faujdar of Bakla (1611–1618)

Faujdar of Bakla
- In office December 1611 – 1618
- Monarch: Jahangir
- Governor: Islam Khan I Qasim Khan Chishti
- Preceded by: Ramchandra Basu (as Raja of Chandradwip)
- Succeeded by: Sabi Khan

Personal details
- Relatives: Syed Kasu (brother)

Syed Ḥakīm (Persian: سید حکیم, Bengali: সৈয়দ হাকীম) was a military general of the Mughal Empire during the reign of Jahangir. He commanded the conquest of Bakla (modern-day Barisal, Bangladesh) and subsequently served as the region's first Mughal faujdar.

== Career ==
The Mughal subahdar (governor) of Bengal, Islam Khan Chishti, appointed Syed Hakim as the main commander of the campaign against Raja Ramchandra Basu of Chandradwip. The battle lasted roughly a week, resulting in the surrender of the Raja and the annexation of Bakla to Mughal Bengal. Following the victory, Hakim and his forces were instructed to assist the Mughal forces battling Raja Pratapaditya of nearby Jessore. The Subahdar also sent Raja Satrajit of Bhusna to present Syed Hakim with robes of honour, horses and other gifts to motivate him to continue his contributions. When Pratapaditya was informed that another Mughal regiment led by Syed Hakim was also coming towards Jessore in addition to dealing with Portuguese armadas, he decided to surrender to the Mughal forces. Following the surrender, Islam Khan sent a letter instructing Syed Hakim to return to Bakla with his brothers and administrate that region on behalf of the Bengal Subah.

In 1615, Qasim Khan Chishti (the next Subahdar of Bengal) instructed Syed Hakim and Syed Kasu to join Syed Abu Bakr in what would be the first of the Ahom–Mughal conflicts. Within a few days, Syed Hakim and Syed Kasu led 400 cavalry and a large infantry, catching up with Syed Abu Bakr's forces in Assam. The Baharistan-i-Ghaibi reports that Syed Abu Bakr did not welcome Syed Hakim's forces despite his acquaintances recommending him to do so. Syed Hakim decided to camp his army outside of the Mughal fort set up by Syed Abu Bakr. The battle began the next day, with the Ahoms destroying each camp as they went along. Due to not being within the fort, Syed Hakim's assistance was belated and the Mughals suffered a heavy defeat, with elephants looted and arsenal destroyed.

== See also ==
- Kirtinarayan Basu, Raja of Chandradwip
