= Jhalakathi Government High School =

- ঝালকাঠি সরকারি উচ্চ বিদ্যালয়

Location
- Barishal; Jhalokati, 8400; Bangladesh; 22°38′25″N 90°12′10″E

Information
- Former name: Moharajgong
- Type: Public boys' school
- Motto: Knowledge is Power
- Established: 3 March 1909; 117 years ago
- School board: Board of Intermediate and Secondary Education, Barisal
- Headmaster: Md. Ibrahim Khalil
- Staff: 6
- Teaching staff: 44
- Gender: Male
- Enrollment: 1,641
- Language: Bengali
- Campus: Urban
- Color
- Nickname: JGHS
- Website: www.jgbhs.edu.bd

Jhalakathi Government High School (Bengali: ঝালকাঠি সরকারী উচ্চ বিদ্যালয়) is a secondary school in Jhalokati Sadar Upazila, Jhalokati District, Bangladesh. It was established in 1909.

The school was built near the Sugandha River, but river erosion spoiled this historic school, and a new two-story school building was later built near the old one. The school has a playground, with a square pond in front. There is also a large coconut garden.

== History ==
Wealthy businessmen established a school named Moharajgong in 1872. The school stood on 26 bighas of land on the right bank of the Sugandha River.

It was provincialized in 1909. A gymnasium was built in 1963. The 11 May 1965 cyclone tore the roof off of it and destroyed the school's sheds. By 1966, the Sugandha had eroded part of the school compound, demolishing the headmaster's quarters and leaving the southeast wing of the main building, an H-shaped tin structure, just yards from the river bank. Locals called for shifting the school to a safer location.

According to the modern plan the school building, playground, headmaster's quarters, a mosque and student's hostel were constructed and the educational activities in the new building were started in 1974. The centennial celebration of the school was held on 3 January 2008, and a new school gate containing a sundial was built.

== Notable alumni ==
- Basudeb DasSarma, chemist

== Gallery ==
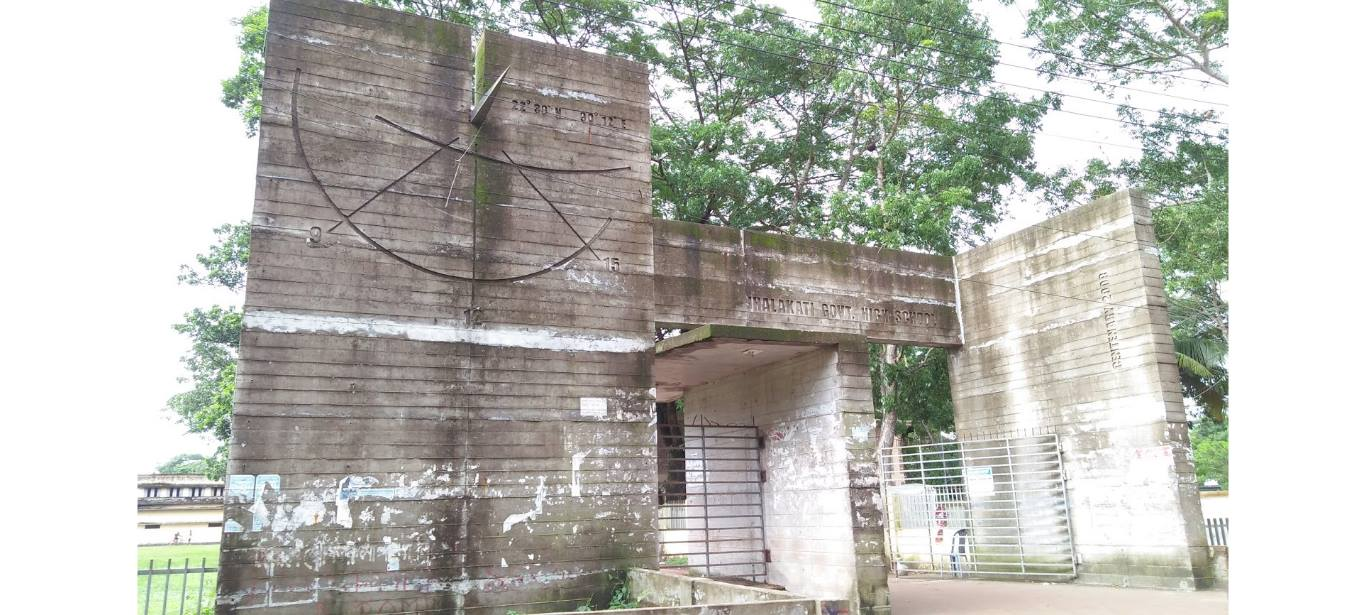
Main School Gate

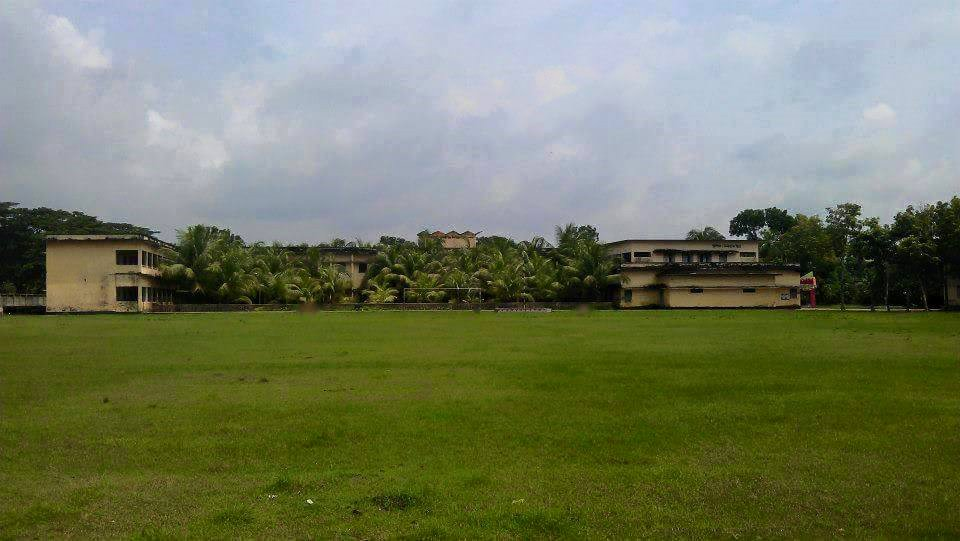
School from the playground
