= Niamat Khan =

Vizier of Balka of Bengal Sultanate (c. 1559)

- নেয়ামত খাঁ

Vizier of Bakla-Chandradwip
- In office 1559
- Monarch: Paramananda Basu

Niamat Khan (Bengali: নেয়ামত খাঁ, Portuguese: Nematchão) was the vizier and leading statesman of the Bakla-Chandradwip kingdom (present-day Barisal Division, Bangladesh) during the latter part of the 16th century. He played a crucial role in initiating one of the earliest known international treaties between a Bengali polity and a European colonial power.

== Biography ==
The arrival of the Portuguese in the Bay of Bengal in the early 16th century introduced new maritime and political dynamics to the region. By the 1520s, ships of the Portuguese Empire had begun frequenting the Port of Chittagong engaging in trade and occasional conflict with the Sultanate of Bengal. Seeking more stable and advantageous relations, Portuguese merchants turned to smaller coastal states that might be more receptive to commercial alliances. The kingdom of Chandradwip, under Raja Paramananda Basu occupied a strategic location near the Meghna estuary. As vizier of Bakla-Chandradwip, Niamat Khan occupied a central role in managing both internal affairs and foreign policy. He confronted the growing need to navigate external pressures from neighbouring rivals, such as the Rajas of Bhulua, Sreepur, Bhushna, and the Arakanese Kingdom of Mrauk U, as well as to engage constructively with European powers seeking influence in Bengal’s littoral regions. In this context, it was Niamat Khan who emerged as the principal figure responsible for initiating formal contact and shaping a diplomatic response to Portuguese overtures.

In 1559, Portuguese merchants arrived at the Madhabpasha Palace, bearing gifts and proposing an alliance. They offered military assistance and commercial partnership in exchange for access to the Port of Bakla and its valuable trade routes. Recognizing the strategic potential of such an arrangement, Niamat Khan was entrusted with full authority to negotiate the terms on behalf of the court.

Accompanied by Kanu Biswas, Niamat Khan led an official diplomatic mission to Goa, the capital of Portuguese India. In the court of Viceroy Constantino of Braganza, he conducted formal negotiations and, on 30 April 1559, signed a treaty of friendship and alliance, written in Portuguese. The original manuscript of the treaty remains preserved at the repositories of Italy.

== See also ==
- Sabi Khan, faujdar of Bakla
- Kirtinarayan Basu, fifth King of Chandradwip
- Hayat Mahmud, military commander of Chandradwip
