= Conestoga-Rovers & Associates =

Conestoga-Rovers & Associates (CRA)
- Company type: Private
- Industry: Environmental Engineering; Construction
- Founded: 1976
- Founder: Frank A. Rovers & Associates and Conestoga Engineering
- Headquarters: Waterloo, Ontario, Canada; Niagara Falls, New York, United States
- Area served: Worldwide
- Key people: Ed Roberts (President)
- Revenue: USD ~650 million (1976-2009)
- Number of employees: 3,000 (2009)
- Website: CRAworld.com

Conestoga-Rovers & Associates (CRA) is a group of companies that provides engineering, environmental consulting, construction, and information technology (IT) services. On July 2, 2014, CRA became a division of the GHD Group. Its current overall headquarters is located in Waterloo, Ontario; however, the firm has locations in multiple countries with a separate headquarters in each. Their U.S. headquarters resides in Niagara Falls, New York, where the company's seminal project, the Love Canal, took place.

== History ==
=== Love Canal ===
The Love Canal Landfill, one of the pinnacle environmental projects in US history, was an open trench that was filled with hazardous chlorinated organic wastes from a chemical plant in Niagara Falls, NY, during the 1940s and 1950s. A residential area and elementary school were constructed immediately adjacent to the former three-block landfill in the 1960s, resulting in an environmental disaster that eventually prompted the initiation of the Superfund legislation in the United States.

In 1977, shortly after the discovery of chemical wastes in the backyards of homes along the canal, CRA began its involvement at Love Canal. CRA was retained to investigate the chemical presence and develop a plan to address the issues. CRA developed an understanding of the hydrogeology and chemical presence, designed a remedial plan, and provided construction oversight for its implementation. CRA continues to be involved in the operation, maintenance, and monitoring for this project to this day.

The company merged with GHD Group in 2014.

== Units ==
- Conestoga-Rovers & Associates
- CRA Contractors Limited
- CRA Developments Limited
- CRA Engineering Group Inc.
- Conestoga-Rovers & Associates (Europe) Ltd.
- CRA Infrastructure & Engineering
- eSolutionsGroup
- HSA Engineers & Scientists
- Inspec-Sol
- SECRA Inc.
