= Durga Sagar =

- Madhabpasha Dighi
- দুর্গা সাগর (Bengali)
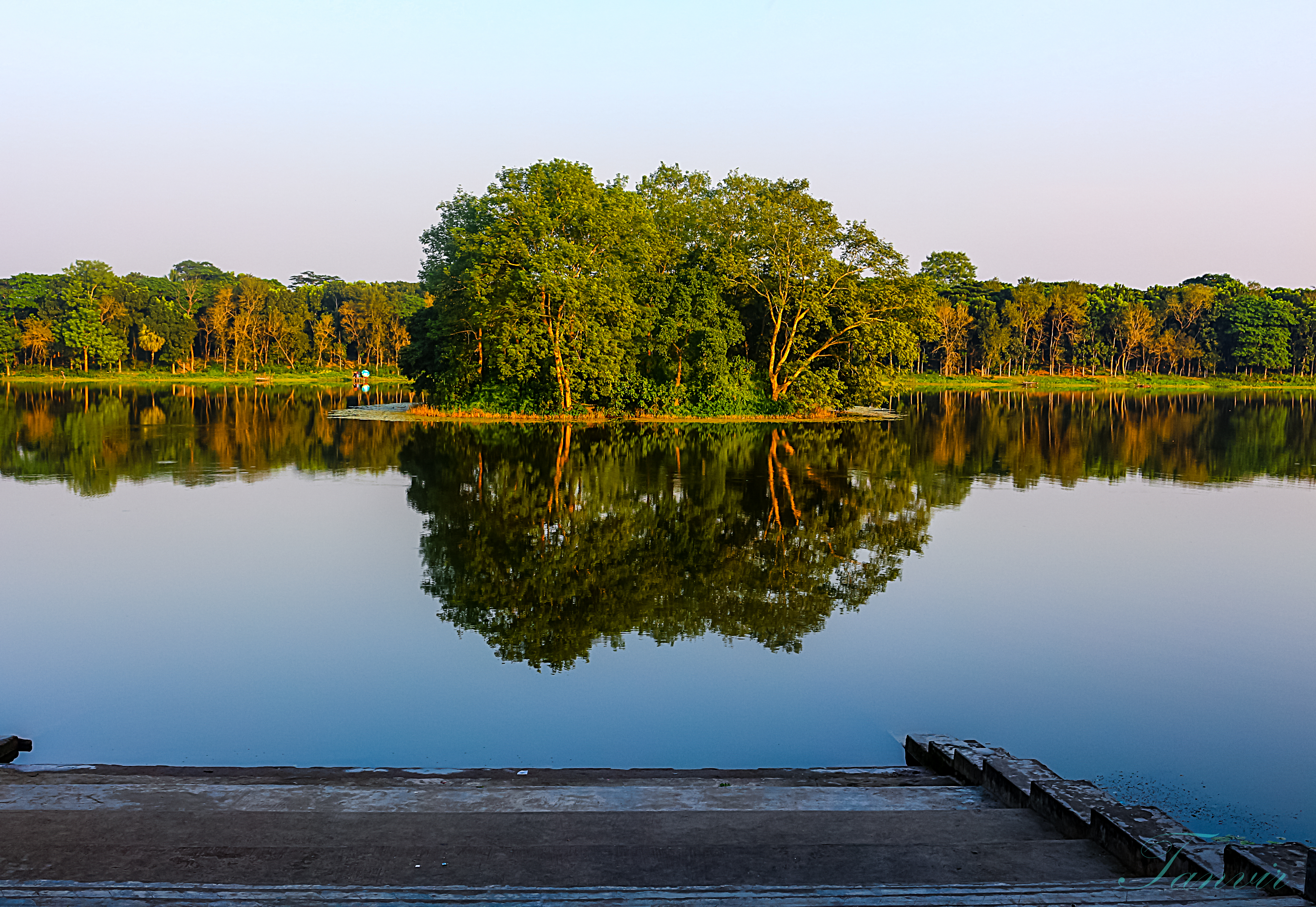
- Mound in the middle of the lake

- Location within Bangladesh Location within South Asia
- Location: Madhabpasha, Babuganj Upazila
- Coordinates: 22°45′40″N 90°17′21″E
- Type: Lake

Durga Sagar, known locally as Madhabpasha Dighi, is the largest lake in southern Bangladesh. It has a total area of about 25 hectares (62 acres). The lake is about 11 kilometres (6.8 mi) away from Barisal city. Rani Durgabati, mother of Raja Joy Narayan, had the pond excavated in 1780. There is a small island in the middle of the lake; this island was originally not part of the lake – it was created artificially to beautify and increase tourist attraction. During the winter, migratory birds gather here.

== Transportation ==
It is located at Madhabpasha village of Babuganj Upazila, about 11 kilometres (6.8 mi) away from Barisal town. Tourists can go there by road, including by bus, from Barisal City.
