= Critical Research Academy =

The Critical Research Academy (CRA) at San Jose State University is a graduate program in the College of Education. The College of Education graduates the largest number of teacher credentials in the San Francisco Bay Area.

The CRA is a two-year program that begins in the fall semester. This program is a combined Multiple Subject Credential and MA program with a focus on Critical Research on Language, Culture, and Society. It offers a program for K-12 teachers primarily interested in education for social justice, development of cultural literacy, education to promote democracy, and pedagogy for teaching in urban schools. The program incorporates requirements for both the Multiple Subject teaching credential and the Master of Arts in Education with a concentration in Curriculum and Instruction. The program follows a cohort model to emphasize continuity of content and student interaction. While the program employs instructors to teach courses, the core faculty include Drs. Rabin, Asato, Schierling, Smith, and Whitenack. The CRA admits 30 students every fall, while becoming more selective with the rise in applications. The College of Education is accredited by Western Association of Schools and Colleges.

== Research ==
The program has a history of students connecting research to practice by completing a masters project for the culmination of their program. Methodology varies, but typically includes students conducting research in local schools or conducting interviews.
