= Deva dynasty =

Bengali Hindu dynasty (c. 12th-13th centuries CE)

- 12th century–13th century
- Capital: Bikrampur
- Common languages: Sanskrit; Bengali
- Religion: Hinduism (Vaishnavism)
- Government: Monarchy
- Mahārājādhirāja Vaṅgapati
- Historical era: Medieval India
  - Established: 12th century
  - Disestablished: 13th century
Preceded by	Succeeded by
Sena dynasty	Delhi Sultanate

Deva Dynasty (c. 12th – 13th centuries) was a Bengali Hindu dynasty which originated in the East Bengal region of the Indian subcontinent; the dynasty ruled over Bengal after the Sena dynasty. The capital of the dynasty was Bikrampur in present-day Munshiganj District of Bangladesh.

This Hindu Vaishnava Deva dynasty is different from the earlier Buddhist Deva dynasty (c. 8th–9th centuries) of Samatata region of Bengal.

== Rulers ==
The major sources of the history of this dynasty are the three copperplate inscriptions of Damodaradeva issued in years 1234, 1236 and 1243, which were his 4th, 6th and 13th regnal years. Although there are many myths about this dynasty, none were proved with strong evidence. The first three rulers are known from the Chittagong copperplate inscription of Damodaradeva dated 1243. The first ruler of this dynasty was Purushottamadeva, who rose from the position of a village chief (gramani). His son Madhumathana or Madhusudanadeva was the first independent ruler of this dynasty, who assumed the title of nripati. He was succeeded by his son Vasudeva and Vasudeva was succeeded by his son Damodaradeva. Damodaradeva (reigned 1231–1243) was the most powerful ruler of this dynasty. He took the title of Ariraja-Chanura-Madhava-Sakala-Bhupati-Chakravarti. The inscriptional evidences show that his kingdom was extended up to the present-day Comilla-Noakhali-Chittagong region. A later ruler of this dynasty Ariraja-Danuja-Madhava Dasharathadeva extended his kingdom up to Bikrampur and made it his capital. 15th century historian Yahya bin Ahmad mentioned in his Tarikh-i-Mubarak Shahi that he (referred as Danuj Rai of Sonargaon by Yahya) made an alliance with Ghiyas-ud-Din Balban in 1281. His brother Bikramaditya Deva later moved to the eastern side of the kingdom in 1294. This is the last recorded history of this dynasty.

== See also ==
- Pala Empire
- History of Bengal
- History of India
- Deva dynasty of Jammu

Preceded by Sena dynasty	Bengal dynasty	Succeeded by Mamluk dynasty
