= Carapur =

Karapur
- Town
- Interactive map of Karapur
- Location in Goa, India Karapur (India)
- Coordinates: 15.55°N 73.97°E
- Country: India
- State: Goa
- District: North Goa
- Elevation: 6 m (20 ft)

Population (2001)
  - Total: 5,334

Languages
  - Official: Konkani
- Time zone: UTC+5:30 (IST)
- Vehicle registration: GA
- Website: goa.gov.in

Karapur is a census town in North Goa district in the state of Goa, India.

== Geography ==
Carapur is located at 15.55°N 73.97°E. It has an average elevation of 6 metres (20 feet).

== Demographics ==
As of 2001 India census, Carapur had a population of 5334. Males constitute 50% of the population and females 50%. Carapur has an average literacy rate of 76%, higher than the national average of 59.5%; with male literacy of 83% and female literacy of 69%. 11% of the population is under 6 years of age.

Carapur Website
