= Bakhsh Ali =

Mughal statesman

Mir Bakhsh Ali

Faujdar of Sarkar Bakla
- In office 1779-1780
- Monarch: Shah Alam II
- Governor: Mubarak Ali Khan

Mīr Bakhsh ʿAlī (Bengali: মীর বখশ আলী, Persian: میر بخش علی), or simply Bakhsh Ali, was a statesman best known for serving as the Faujdar of Bakla (Barisal) during the reigns of Mughal emperor Shah Alam II and Nawab of Bengal Mubarak Ali Khan.

== Career ==
Ali was a significant figure in the administration of Mughal Bengal, particularly during the decline of the Mughal Empire and the rise of the East India Company's colonial power. In September 1779, Bakhsh Ali found himself embroiled in a contentious dispute with Jayanarayana, the last Zamindar of Chandradwipa. Jayanarayana, seeking redress, lodged a formal complaint with the East India Company, accusing the Faujdar of Bakla (Barisal) of impeding the smooth administration of his zamindari estate. However, this very grievance, far from bringing any alleviation, only served to exacerbate Jayanarayana's predicament, culminating in the catastrophic consequence of his estate being seized and auctioned off by the Company.

By December of that same year, Company officials in the eastern districts of Bengal brought to the attention of Governor-General Warren Hastings grave accusations concerning Bakhsh Ali's deplorable conduct. It was asserted that he was perpetrating acts of brutality and misconduct throughout every pargana within the jurisdiction of Sarkar Bakla (Barisal). In light of the gravity of these allegations, British commercial and administrative officers, deeply perturbed by the extent of his transgressions, were compelled to draft formal petitions and issue stern reprimands, to address the egregious nature of his behaviour.

On 19 January 1780, Nawab Mubarak-ud-Dawlah, in a letter to Governor-General Warren Hastings, conveyed that he had taken decisive action in the matter at hand, dispatching agents vested with warrants for Ali's apprehension. He had specifically enjoined the Faujdar of Jahangir Nagar to ensure that Ali was swiftly conveyed to Murshidabad without delay, whereupon his arrival a meticulous and exhaustive investigation would be undertaken. The Nawab further assured that, following the completion of this inquiry, Hastings would be duly apprised of the outcome. Should the allegations against Ali be substantiated, the Nawab vowed to mete out such punishment as the gravity of the offence warranted. In addition, he entreated the Company to appoint a fitting successor to Ali, to preserve the integrity and smooth functioning of the criminal justice system in Barisal, ensuring that no further disruptions would imperil its efficacy.

== See also ==
- History of Barisal
