= Siraj Uddin Ahmed =

Bangladeshi writer, politician and freedom fighter awarded the Independence Award

- সিরাজ উদদীন আহমেদ

Personal details
- Born: 14 October 1941 (age 84) Babuganj, Bengal Province, British India
- Party: Awami League
- Spouse: Begum Firaeza
- Children: 2
- Education: University of Dhaka; Brojomohun College
- Awards: Independence Award (2022)

Siraj Uddin Ahmed (born 14 October 1941) a former Bangladeshi government official, writer, politician and freedom fighter. He was awarded the Independence Award in 2022 for his contribution to the war of independence and liberation.

== Early life ==
Ahmed was born on 14 October 1941 in the village of Arjikalikapur in Babuganj, Barisal. His father's name was Jahan Uddin Fakir and his mother's name was Laily Begum. He obtained his matriculation from Sayestabad MH Secondary School in 1956, higher secondary and BA degree from Barisal BM College. He obtained MA in economics from University of Dhaka in 1962 and BL degree in 1968. His wife is Begum Firaeza. The couple has two children, Shahriar Ahmed Shilpi and Shakil Ahmed Bhaskar.His granddaughters are Zaara Ahmed,Ajhara Ahmed.His grandsons are Fardin Ahmed,Arin Ahmed.

== Career ==
Ahmed was the coordinator of Barguna District Struggle Committee in 1971. In 1975, he was the SDO of Barguna subdivision. He served as Deputy Secretary in the Ministry of Finance, Joint Secretary in the Ministry of Women and Children Affairs, Additional Secretary in the Ministry of Education, Executive Chairman of the Board of Investment and a member of the Bangladesh Public Service Commission. He is the advisor of Barisal district Awami League.
