= Madhabpasha =

Madhabpasha মাধবপাশা
- Village
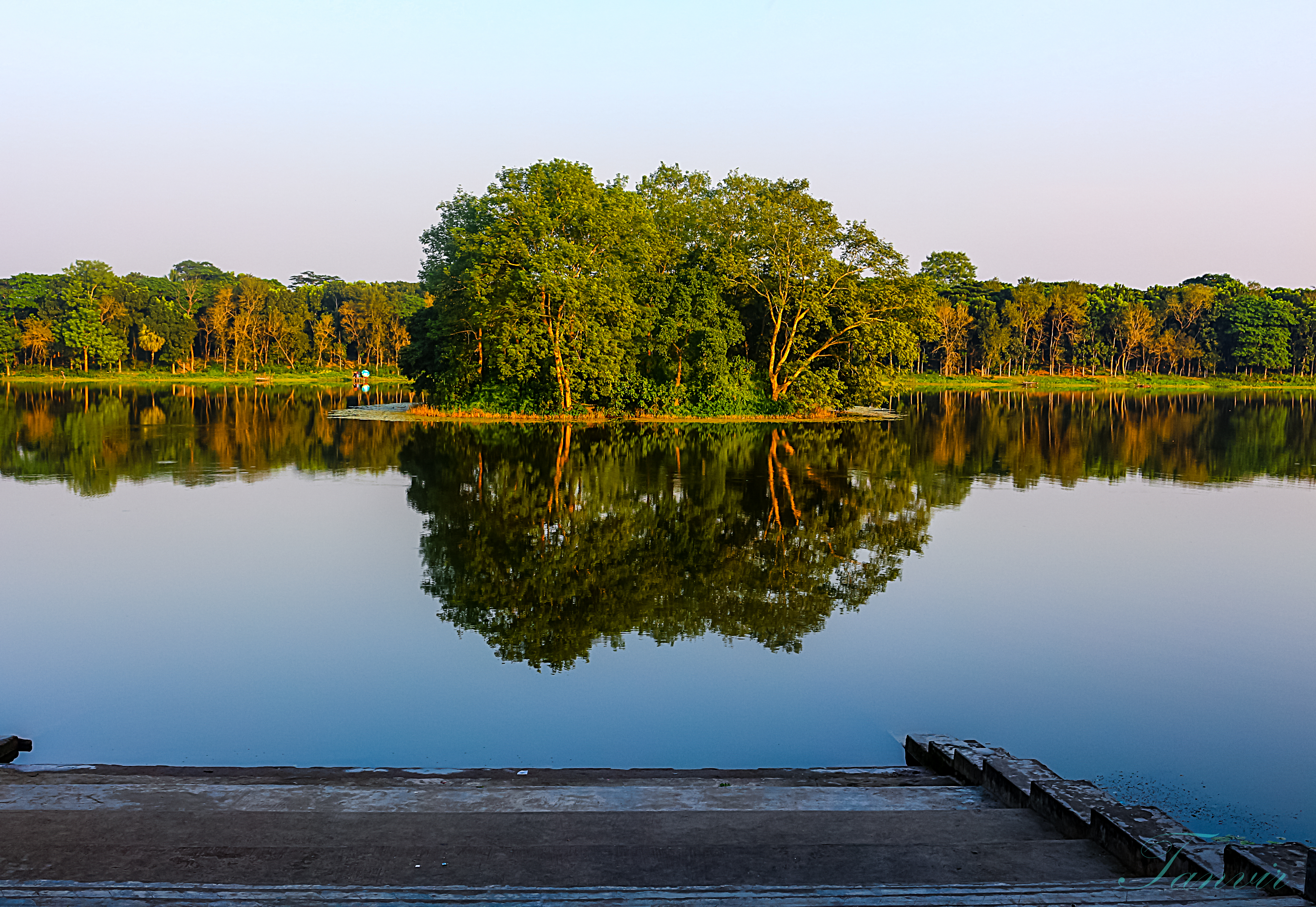
- Durga Sagar Lake

- Location in Bangladesh
- Coordinates: 22°47′N 90°17′E
- Country: Bangladesh
- Division: Barisal Division
- District: Barisal District
- Upazila: Babuganj Upazila

Area
  - Total: 4.56 km^{2} (1.76 sq mi)

Population (2022)
  - Total: 6,732
  - Density: 1,480/km^{2} (3,820/sq mi)
- Time zone: UTC+6 (Bangladesh Time)

Madhabpasha is a village in Babuganj Upazila of Barisal District in the Barisal Division of southern-central Bangladesh.

== Demography ==
According to the 2022 Census of Bangladesh, Madhabpasha had 1,634 households and a population of 6,732. It has a total area of 4.56 km^{2} (1.76 sq mi).

== Tourist attraction ==
- Durga Sagar Lake
- Madhabpasha Palace
