= Boalia, Bakerganj =

Boalia বোয়ালিয়া
- Village
- Location in Bangladesh
- Coordinates: 22°35′N 90°21′E
- Country: Bangladesh
- Division: Barisal Division
- District: Barisal District
- Upazila: Bakerganj Upazila

Population (2022)
  - Total: 4,133
- Time zone: UTC+6 (Bangladesh Time)

Boalia is a village in Bakerganj Upazila of Barisal District in the Barisal Division of southern-central Bangladesh.

According to the 2022 Census of Bangladesh, Boalia had 1,013 households and a population of 4,133.
