= Muladi Upazila =

Muladi মুলাদী
- Upazila
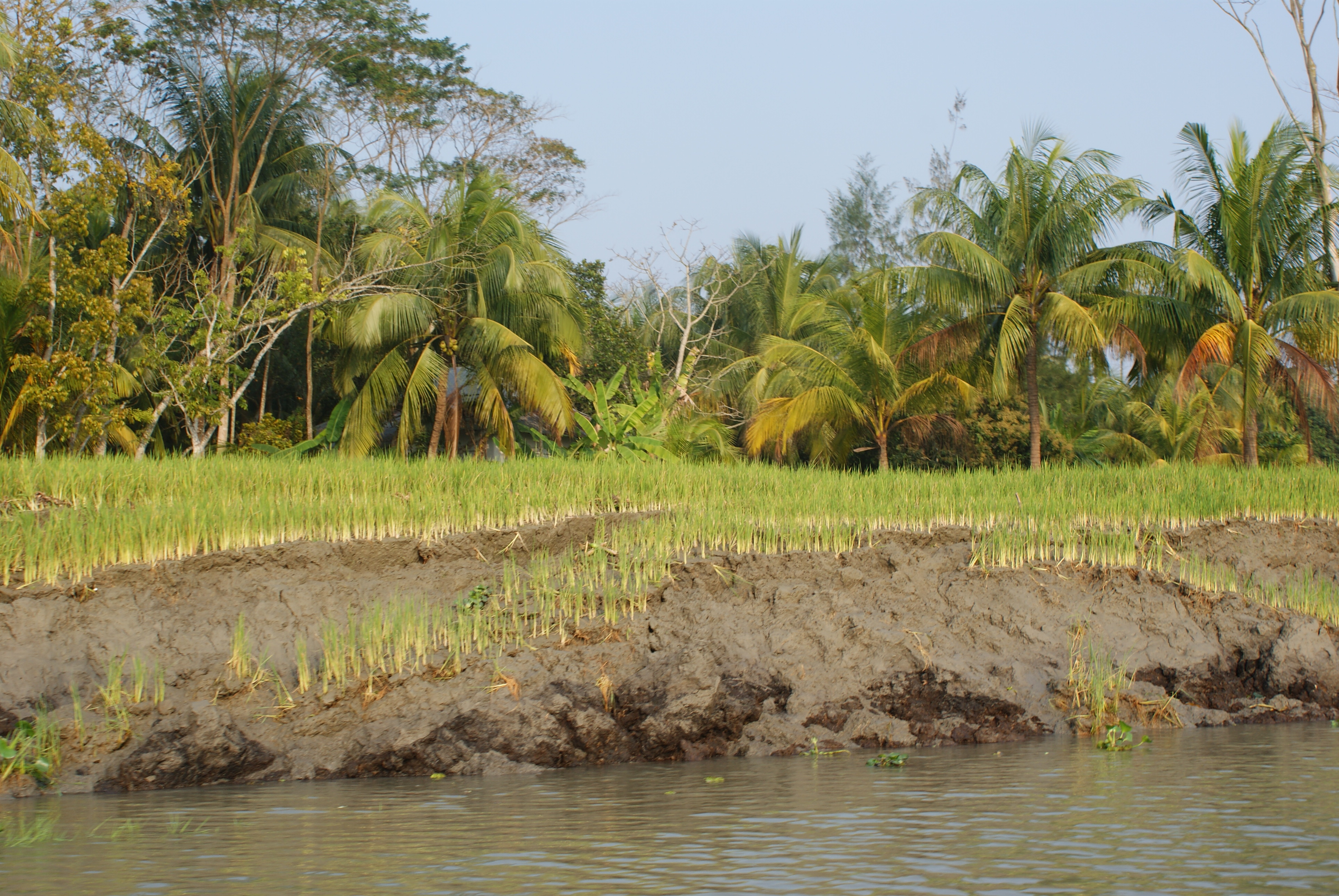
- Riverbank erosion in Muladi Upazila, Barisal District

- Coordinates: 22°54.9′N 90°24.9′E
- Country: Bangladesh
- Division: Barishal Division
- District: Barishal District

Government
  - MP: Golam Kibria Tipu

Area
  - Total: 261.02 km^{2} (100.78 sq mi)

Population (2022)
  - Total: 181,929
  - Density: 659/km^{2} (1,710/sq mi)
- Time zone: UTC+6 (BST)
- Postal code: 8250
- Area code: 04326
- Website: Official Map of Muladi Upazila

Muladi (Bengali: মুলাদী) is an upazila of Barishal District in Barisal Division, Bangladesh.

== Geography ==
Muladi is located at 22.9153°N 90.4150°E. It has a total area of 261.02 km^{2}. It borders Gosairhat Upazila on the north, Barisal Sadar Upazila on the south, Hizla and Mehendiganj Upazilas on the east, and Kalkini, Gournadi, and Babuganj Upazilas on the west.

== History ==
Following the Conquest of Bakla in the early 17th century, Emperor Jahangir awarded parts of Chandradwip to Ulfat Ghazi for his participation, and these areas became the Nazirpur pargana of Bakla. His son, Syed Qutb Shah, first settled in the village of Terachar in present-day Muladi. He was renowned for his Muslim missionary activities across Barisal, Madaripur, and Bagerhat. He also dug reservoirs and ponds and built mosques for the welfare of locals. A large pond was excavated by Syed Qutb Shah in Terachar but has now been submerged by the Arial Khan River. Qutb Shah subsequently migrated to Nalchira due to the unsafe conditions in Terachar, and his descendants continued to hold influential positions in the history of Barisal for several centuries.

== Demographics ==
Historical population
Year	Pop. (000)	±%
1981	146	—
1991	171	+17.1%
2001	183	+7.0%
2011	175	−4.4%
2022	181	+3.4%
Source: Bangladesh Bureau of Statistics

Religions in Muladi Upazila (2022)
Religion	Percent
Islam	99.30%
Hinduism	0.68%
Other or not stated	0.02%

According to the 2022 Bangladeshi census, Muladi Upazila had 46,336 households and a population of 181,929. 10.31% of the population were under 5 years of age. Muladi had a literacy rate (age 7 and over) of 74.34%: 74.23% for males and 74.43% for females, and a sex ratio of 85.70 males for every 100 females. 48,835 (26.84%) lived in urban areas.

According to the 2011 Census of Bangladesh, Muladi Upazila had 38,394 households and a population of 174,775, 18.5% of whom lived in urban areas. 11.1% of the population was under the age of 5. The sex ratio was 1,117 females per 1000 males, and the literacy rate (age 7 and over) was 56.0%, compared to the national average of 51.8%.

== Main occupations ==
51.17% of the population work in agriculture, 20.67% as agricultural labourers, 3.18% as wage labourers, 7.52% in commerce, 7.13% in services, 2.5% in fishing, and 7.83% in other occupations.

== Land use ==
Cultivable land covers 26,159.45 hectares and fallow land 237.56 hectares; single crop 42%, double crop 50% and treble crop land 8%. 74% of cultivable land is under irrigation.

=== Land control ===
Among the peasants, 29% are landless, 7.09% marginal, 32.82% small, 27% intermediate and 4.09% rich; cultivable land per head 0.14 hectare.

=== Land value ===
The market value of land of the first grade is approximately 5,000 Tk per 0.01 hectares.

=== Crops and fruits ===
The main crops are Paddy, wheat, sweet potatoes, pulses, brinjal and betel leaves, and the main fruits are mangoes, jackfruits, bananas, blackberries, coconuts, lychee, palms, betel nuts and amra. The extinct or nearly extinct crops are Jute, tobacco, mustard seeds, groundnuts, garlic, sugar cane, arahar, china and kaun.

== Administration ==
UNO: Md. Nizam Uddin

Muladi thana was established in 1967 and was turned into an upazila in 1983.

Muladi Upazila is divided into Muladi Municipality and seven union parishads: Batamara, Char Kalekhan, Gachhua, Kazir Char, Muladi, Nazirpur, and Safipur. The union parishads are subdivided into 77 mauzas and 102 villages.

== Education ==
There are 6 colleges, 30 high schools, 5 junior schools, 78 government primary schools, 50 non-government primary schools, 17 madrasas, and a kindergarten. The noted educational institutions are Bheduriachar Government Primary School (1892) and Tayak Tomchar Government Primary School (1845).

== See also ==
- Upazilas of Bangladesh
- Districts of Bangladesh
- Divisions of Bangladesh
- Administrative geography of Bangladesh
