= Certified Research Administrator =

United States research designation

The Certified Research Administrator (CRA) is a designation granted in the United States by the Research Administrators Certification Council to individuals who demonstrate the knowledge necessary to serve as an administrator of professional and sponsored research programs. To be eligible to certify, candidates must meet one of three sets of requirements (see "Requirements" below). Once a candidate passes the Certified Research Administrator examination, they are conferred the right to use the CRA designation. The RACC also offers Certified Pre-Award Research Administrator and Certified Financial Research Administrator designations.

== CRA designation ==
According to the RACC, the CRA designation carries numerous benefits to those who hold it, such as recognition among professionals, a sense of personal satisfaction, indication of expertise in the administration of sponsored research endeavors, greater opportunities for employment, greater opportunities for advancement, robust credibility, and the ability to serve as a role model to research peers. The CRA designation is a registered certification mark with the U.S. Patent and Trademark Office.

As of June 2, 2022, 3,296 active CRAs are listed in the RACC's online database.

=== History ===
In 1993, the Research Administrators Certification Council (RACC) was founded as a private non-profit organization. Active CRAs sit on the council and have the role of certifying that an individual possesses adequate knowledge for serving as a professional research administrator of sponsored programs, particularly federally-funded research grants and contracts.

=== Requirements ===
Candidates must meet one of the following sets of requirements:

1. Bachelor's or advanced degree and three years of professional experience in research administration or sponsored programs administration either in a sponsoring or recipient organization or the equivalent in a self-funded organization; OR
2. An associate degree and five years of professional experience in research administration or sponsored programs administration either in a sponsoring or recipient organization or the equivalent in a self-funded organization; OR
3. No degree and six years of professional experience in the research administration or sponsored programs administration either in a sponsoring or recipient organization or the equivalent in a self-funded organization.

The third option requires approval of a petition to the RACC in order to receive a waiver.

Candidates must pass a written Certified Research Administrator examination designed by the RACC and administered by Professional Testing Center, New York, which covers fundamental information necessary for meeting the demands and responsibilities of a career in sponsored program administration.

== CRA exam curriculum ==
The curriculum covered by the CRA examination is referred to by the RACC as the "Body of Knowledge," and has four broad components:

1. Project Development and Administration
2. Legal requirements and Sponsor Interface
3. Financial Management
4. General Management

== Recertification ==
Every three years, CRAs must recertify to continue using the CRA designation. Recertification applicants are expected to demonstrate continued participation or employment in the field of research administration, including requisite hours of continuing education activities and a collection of several questions for potential use on future revisions of the CRA exam.
