= Kirtinarayan Basu =

- Raja of Chandradwip
- Reign: 1668–??
- Predecessor: Ramchandra Basu
- Born: Madhabpasha Palace, Chandradwip, Bengal
- Died: Pipilita, Chandradwip, Bengal (present-day Jhalakathi District, Bangladesh)
- Issue: Mahmud Hasan Taqi
- Religion: Hinduism (initially); Sunni Islam

Kirtinarayan Basu (Bengali: কীর্তিনারায়ণ বসু; r. 1668), also spelt Kirti Narayan Basu, was the eleventh raja of medieval Chandradwip, a zamindari which covered much of the Barisal Division of present-day Bangladesh.

== Background ==
Kirtinarayan Basu was born in the 17th-century to an aristocratic Bengali Kulin Kayastha Basu family in the Madhabpasha Palace of Chandradwip, which had become a feudal territory of the Mughal Empire following the defeat of his father, Ramchandra Basu, against the forces of Islam Khan I in 1611. His mother, Vimala, was the first wife of Ramchandra Basu and the daughter of Raja Pratapaditya of Jessore.

== Reign ==
Kirtinarayan became the Raja of Chandradwip following the death of his father, Ramchandra. Shortly after his accession, Chandradwip's Portuguese military commander, João Geri, launched a rebellion with 10,000 soldiers. Kirtinarayan rallied the supporting remnants of the army and a three-day battle occurred between the two forces in Ballabhpur. Many of Chandradwip's Portuguese soldiers were killed and Geri subsequently fled the Bakla region.

As a result of Portuguese betrayal, Kirtinarayan reorganised the Chandradwip army and supported the Mughal governor Shaista Khan in his campaign to subdue Portuguese and Magh (Arakanese) pirates in the Bay of Bengal. To protect Chandradwip from Magh-Portuguese attacks, Kirtinarayan constructed several forts in his territory. A fort was constructed in the village of Jagua (east of the Kalijira river) and the Raipur fort (west of the Kalijira) that was constructed by his father was repaired. He constructed a moat in Koterdon where he stationed troops, and also constructed some new forts in Shahbazpur.

Kirtinarayan also contributed to the development of education in the Bakla region by establishing schools in Madhabpasha, Guthia, Hosenpur, Narayanpur, Khalisakotha, Shikarpur, Nalchira, Gaila and other areas.

== Conversion to Islam ==
Despite Kirtinarayan's contributions to Chandradwip's military and educational facilities, his reformations to Hindu dietary customs caused backlash. Kirtinarayan was invited by the Governor of Bengal Shaista Khan to his court in Jahangir Nagar (Old Dhaka) to discuss the war against the Magh-Portuguese pirates. A feast was presented with Halal meat, which caused the Hindu community to excommunicate him. Khan suggested that he convert to Islam instead, to which Kirtinarayan willingly accepted. The Hindu elders of Chandradwip refused to recognise his status, and so the Chandradwip zamindari was passed on to his younger brother, Basudev.

Kirtinarayan subsequently resettled in the village of Keora. He eventually married a Muslim woman, with whom he had a son named Mahmud Hasan Taqi. Kirtinarayan maintained his relationship with the Mughals, and continued to fight against the Magh pirates. After being injured in an encounter against the Maghs, Kirtinarayan shortly died and was buried in the nearby village of Pipalita. His favourite horse was also buried not far from him.

== Succession and legacy ==
Although Kirtinarayan was made to give up Chandradwip to his younger brother Basudev, he continued to possess land in the Chandradwip and Salimabad parganas even after becoming a Muslim. His descendants, known as the Baklai family of Keora, held taluqs in Mathbaria and Morrelganj. His son and successor, Mahmud Hasan Taqi, founded a mosque in Keora. Taqi had three sons; Mahmud Ghazanfar Ali, Mahmud Sadeq and Ejaz Mahmud. Mahmud Sadeq's son was Qutb Mahmud, whose son was Jan Mahmud, whose son was Rahmat Ali Baklai, whose son was Mahmud Ali Baklai, whose son was Amud Ali Baklai, whose son was Ahmad Ali Balkai, whose son was Abdul Majid Baklai. In total, Kirtinarayan's descendants number over one thousand today.

== See also ==
- Hayat Mahmud, an 18th-century military commander for Chandradwip

Preceded by Ramchandra Basu	Raja of Chandradwip; 1668-?	Succeeded by Basudev Basu

== Bibliography ==
- Ahmed, Siraj Uddin (2010). বরিশাল বিভাগের ইতিহাস [History of the Barisal Division] (in Bengali). Dhaka: Bhaskar Prakashani.
