= Hayat Mahmud =

Bengali landlord

Hayat Mahmud হায়াত মাহমুদ
- Born: 18th century Chandradwip, Bengal Presidency, British India
- Died: 19th century Bakerganj, Bengal Presidency, British India
- Citizenship: British Indian
- Occupations: Landlord; Freedom Fighter
- Children: 2

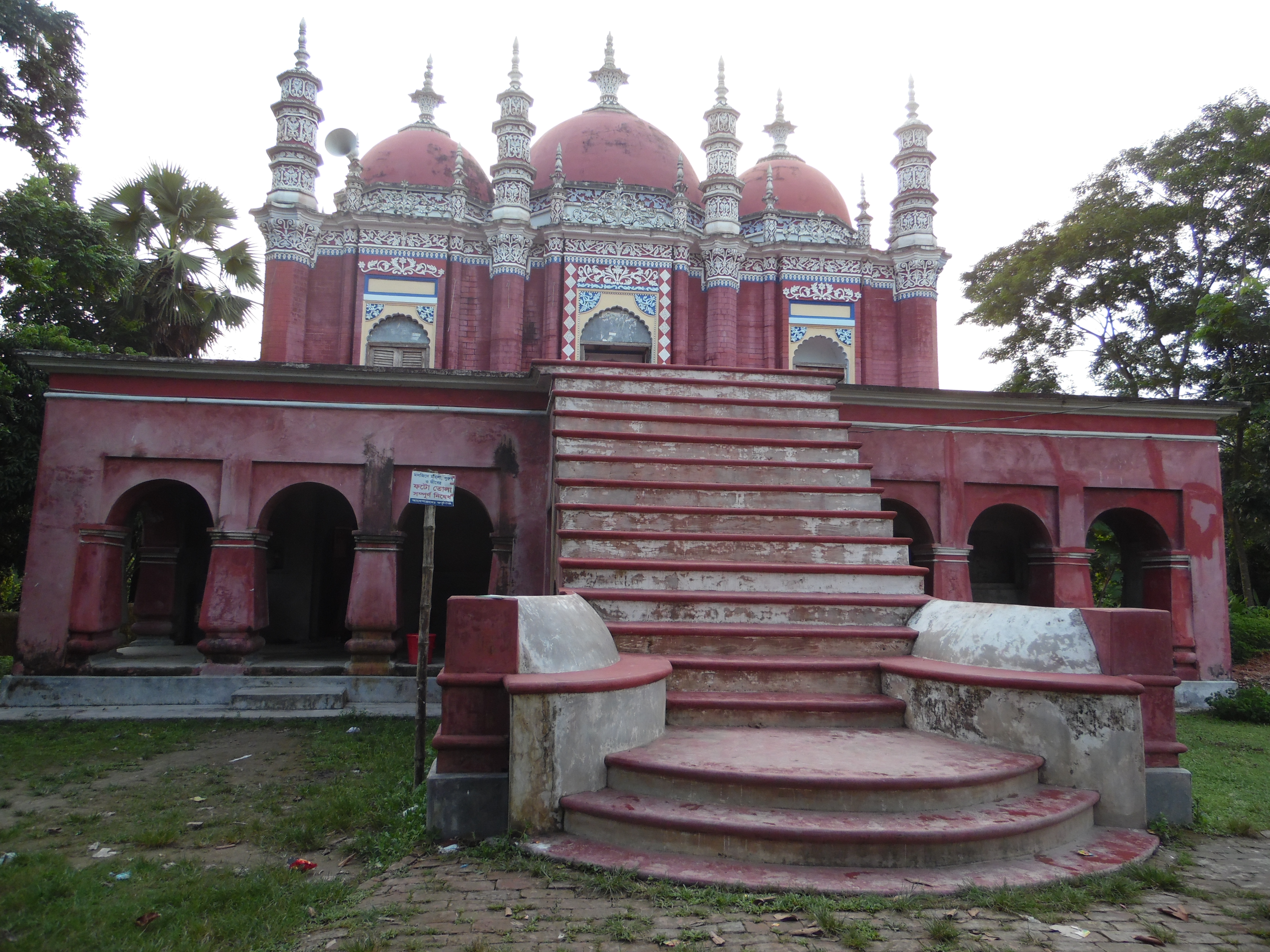
The Miah Bari Mosque in North Karapur.

Hayat Mahmud (Bengali: হায়াত মাহমুদ) was a late 18th-century Bengali Muslim commander who later became the feudal lord of Buzurg-Umedpur in Barisal. He is best known as a freedom fighter against the British East India Company, and for the construction of the Miah Bari Mosque, which continues to be a popular tourist attraction in southern Bangladesh.

== Biography ==
Hayat Mahmud was born in the 18th century, and was most probably the son of Maldar Khan, who was employed in the military of the feudal Raja of Chandradwip. Mahmud was also admitted to the Chandradwip military forces. On one occasion, the Raja was kidnapped by two rival feudal families of nearby Chakhar, the Mirs and Majumdars. Mahmud then rose to popularity after embarking on a night mission to free the Raja. To express gratitude for this service, the Raja granted two taluqs to Maldar Khan and Hayat Mahmud, which were later inherited by Mahmud's descendants who are known as the Mia family of Karapur. The pargana of Buzurg-Umedpur was also one of Hayat Mahmud's taluqs.

Having now become a powerful feudal lord in South Bengal, the British East India Company later posed a threat to his status. Mahmud refused to comply with the Company rule in Bengal and surrender the Buzurg-Umpedpur pargana. As a result, the British officers were instructed to close off all water routes to Barisal. Mahmud was declared as a "Dacoit Sardar" (bandit chieftain). The Company sepoys managed to capture him in 1789 and took him to their ally Nusrat Jung, the erstwhile Naib Nazim of Jahangir Nagar, who was considered to have been an anglophile. In 1790, the Naib Nazim suggested that Mahmud receives lifetime imprisonment. Lord Cornwallis then had Mahmud exiled to the Prince of Wales Island in British Malaya and stripped his zamindari of Buzurg-Umedpur.

Mahmud was released in 1806 and thereafter avoided getting into any disputes with the Company rule and began living a quieter life. He built a new home on 30 acres of land in Karapur. Mahmud has been credited to have established the Miah Bari Mosque in 1807, though others have claimed that it was actually founded by his son, Mahmud Zahid. He had another son named Mahmud Zakir.

== See also ==
- Kirtinarayan Basu, 17th-century Raja of Chandradwip who converted to Islam
- Mirza Agha Baqer, an earlier jagirdar of Buzurg-Umedpur
- Syed Azizul Huq, a relative of the Majumdars of Chakhar
