= Faujdar =

Mughal military commander

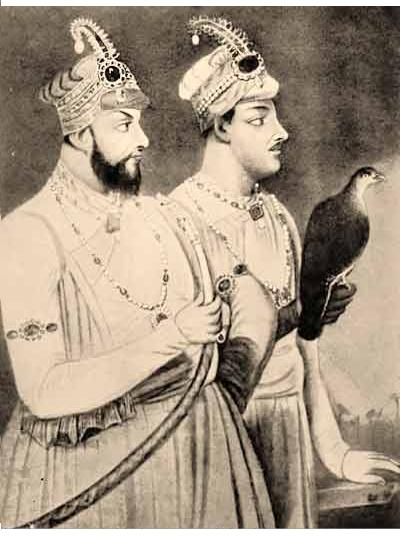
Mir Jafar was the Mughal Faujdar of Orissa until the year 1747.

Faujdar was an office of the Mughal Empire that combined military, judicial and land revenue functions. The term "faujdar" has pre-Mughal origins. During those times, the term referred to a military officer but did not refer to a specific rank. With the administrative reforms of Mughal emperor Akbar, this rank was systemised. It constituted an independent administrative unit and its territorial limits varied from place to place and from time to time.

A faujdari (district) comprised a number of thanas (military outposts). At each of these, a number of sowars (soldiers) were stationed under a thanadar (chief). Each faujdari carried with it a fixed number of sawars, and it was up to the faujdar to station soldiers in the various thanas under him.

In addition, in some faujdaris, there were a number of thanas described as حضورِی, huzuri or حضورِی مشروطِی, huzuri mashruti. In these thanas, the thanadars were appointed directly by the central government via royal orders or at the recommendations of the Nizam or Diwan of the province. Such thanadars were, to a considerable degree, independent officers, who could receive orders directly from the central government. They were probably placed under the overall supervision of the faujdar and were expected to cooperate with him in maintaining law and order. They were created to ensure an efficient check on ambitious faujdars.

In an emergency, the faujdar of a charge could be called upon to enforce imperial regulations.

They were appointed by virtue of a royal order and the appointment bore the seal of the Bakshi ul Mulki. They received orders directly from the Emperor and submitted petitions directly to the court. Transfer was a well established practice.

== Duties ==
Generally, a faujdar's military and police duties included:

- Maintaining law and order.
- Enforcing imperial regulations.
- Preventing drinking and other forbidden activities.
- Making sure blacksmiths did not manufacture guns.
- Apprehending thieves and restoring stolen properties. If he failed to do so, he was held personally responsible.
- Maintaining law and order and ensuring the safety of roads and highways.
- Keeping rebel zamindars under check.
- Making sure his soldiers were well equipped and making necessary arrangements in case a soldier lost his horse for whatever reason.

His judicial functions were:

- Dispensing justice.
- Presiding over court, along with the Qazi and the Diwan.
- Deciding on cases regarding Holy Law, in consultation with judicial officials such as Mufti, Qazi and Mir Adl.
- Deciding on cases which fell under the purview of revenue and other general imperial regulations, with no consultations with anyone else.

His revenue administration functions were:

- Collecting land revenue from zamindars who evaded payment and only paid under the threat of force.
- Entrusting the collection of land revenue from such zamindars to the Maori or nominate an intermediary and authorise the Maori to collect the land revenue from the latter.
- Rendering necessary assistance in collection of land revenue to the Amil in Khalsa or jagir lands, upon a written request from the latter. Could not pillage a village until a written request was forthcoming from the Amil.
  - On receipt of such a written request he was required to get hold of a few Muqaddams and persuade them to be obedient. If they responded favourably at this stage, the Faujdar was required to obtain written consent from the Amil.
  - If the Muqaddams refused to submit, he was to pillage the village and chastise the rebels. The ryots should not be harmed. The booty acquired was to be handed over to the Amil, who had to give a receipt to the Faujdar.

== See also ==
- Kotwal
- Kiladar
- Castellan
