= List of archaeological sites in Barisal Division =

Archaeological sites in Barisal Division of Bangladesh

List of archaeological sites in Barisal Division of Bangladesh. According to the Department of Archaeology, there are 21 archaeological sites in the area.

== List ==
No.	Name	District	Location	Image
1	Nasrat Gazi Mosque	Barishal	Bakerganj Upazila	Nasrat Gazi Mosque
2	Qasba Mosque	Barishal	Gournadi Upazila	Qasba Mosque
3	Mahilara Sarkar Math	Barishal	Gournadi Upazila	Mahilara Sarkar Math
4	Kamalapur Mosque	Barishal	Gournadi Upazila	Kamalapur Mosque
5	Miah Bari Mosque	Barishal	Barisal Sadar Upazila	Miah Bari Mosque
6	Collectorate Bhaban	Barishal	Barishal Sadar Upazila	Collectorate Bhaban
7	Kazi Bari Jame Masjid	Barishal	Muladi Upazila	
8	Bibi Chini Mosque	Barguna	Betagi Upazila	Bibi Chini Mosque
9	Shrirampur Mosque	Patuakhali	Patuakhali Sadar Upazila	
10	Amirullah Munshibari Jame Mosque	Patuakhali	Dashmina Upazila	Amirullah Munshibari Jame Masjid
11	Kachichira Jami Mosque	Patuakhali	Patuakhali Sadar Upazila	
12	Sikder Bari Jami Mosque	Patuakhali	Patuakhali Sadar Upazila	
13	Double Roofed Grave	Patuakhali	Patuakhali Sadar Upazila	
14	Ancient Bridge	Patuakhali	Patuakhali Sadar Upazila	
15	Majidbaria Shahi Mosque	Patuakhali	Mirzaganj Upazila	Majidbaria Shahi Mosque
16	Galua Paka Masjid	Jhalokati	Rajapur Upazila	Galua Paka Masjid
17	Khanbari Old Jame Mosque Complex	Jhalokati	Rajapur	Khanbari Old Jami Mosque Complex
18	Saturia Zamindar Bari	Jhalokati	Rajapur	Saturia Zamindar Bari
19	Dahar Shankar Howladerbari Jami Mosque Complex	Jhalokati	Rajapur	
20	Ancient Jami Mosque	Jhalokati	Rajapur	Ancient Jami Mosque
21	Momin Mosque	Pirojpur	Mathbaria Upazila	Momin Mosque

== See also ==
- List of archaeological sites in Bangladesh
