= Ahammadkati =

Ahammadkati আহমদকাটী Āhāmmadkāti
- Location in Bangladesh
- Coordinates: 23°03′N 90°11′E
- Country: Bangladesh
- Division: Barisal Division
- District: Barisal District
- Upazila: Gaurnadi Upazila

Area
  - Total: 0.40 sq mi (1.03 km^{2})

Population (1961)
  - Total: 263
- Time zone: UTC+6 (Bangladesh Time)

Ahammadkati (also spelled Ahammedkati or Ahmadkati, Bengali: আহমদকাটী) is a village and mouza in Gaurnadi Upazila in the Barisal District of southern-central Bangladesh.

== Geography ==
The settlement lies in the Ganges Delta.

== Transport ==
To the east of Ahammadkati is the N8 highway which, via Gaurnadi and Bachhar, connects the village with Barisal in the south. The nearest airport is 16 miles (26 km) away at Barisal Airport.
