= Sarikal =

Sarikal সরিকল
- Village
- Location in Bangladesh
- Coordinates: 22°55′N 90°18′E
- Country: Bangladesh
- Division: Barisal Division
- District: Barisal District
- Upazila: Gournadi Upazila

Area
  - Total: 2.95 km^{2} (1.14 sq mi)

Population (2022)
  - Total: 3,495
  - Density: 1,180/km^{2} (3,070/sq mi)
- Time zone: UTC+6 (Bangladesh Time)

Sarikal is a village in Gournadi Upazila of Barisal District in the Barisal Division of southern-central Bangladesh.

According to the 2022 Census of Bangladesh, Sarikal had 864 households and a population of 3,495. It has a total area of 2.95 km^{2} (1.14 sq mi).

== Notable people ==
- Omar Sani, actor
- Zahir Uddin Swapan, politician
