= West Showra Alim Madrasha =

Madrasa in Barisal, Bangladesh

Coordinates: 22.973°N 90.228°E

West Shawra Alim Madrasha পশ্চিম শাওড়া আলিম মাদরাসা
- West Saura, Ward 6, Gournadi, Barisal District; Bangladesh

Information
- Other name: Pashchim Saura Madrasa
- Type: Alim Madrasa
- Religious affiliation(s): Islam
- Established: 1973
- Founder: Muhammad Abdul Jalil
- School board: Bangladesh Madrasah Education Board
- Language: Bengali, Arabic
- Website: www.facebook.com/poschimshaoraalimmadrasha

West Shaora Alim Madrasha (Bengali: পশ্চিম শাওড়া আলিম মাদরাসা; Arabic: المدرسة العالمية شاورا الغربية) is an alim madrasa, situated in West Shaora, Gaurnadi Upazila, Barisal District, Bangladesh. It became an alim madrasha in 1973. Its first principal was Mawlana Mohammad Abdul Jalil.
