= Batajor =

Batajor বাটাজোর
- Village
- Location in Bangladesh
- Coordinates: 22°54′N 90°16′E
- Country: Bangladesh
- Division: Barisal Division
- District: Barisal District
- Upazila: Gournadi Upazila

Area
  - Total: 1.36 km^{2} (0.53 sq mi)

Population (2022)
  - Total: 1,992
  - Density: 1,460/km^{2} (3,790/sq mi)
- Time zone: UTC+6 (Bangladesh Time)

Batajor is a village in Gournadi Upazila of Barisal District in the Barisal Division of southern-central Bangladesh.

== Demography ==
According to the 2022 Census of Bangladesh, Batajor had 471 households and a population of 1,992. It has a total area of 1.36 km^{2} (0.53 sq mi).

== Notable people ==
- Brajamohan Dutta
- Ashwini Kumar Dutta
