= Mahilara =

Mahilara মাহিলারা
- Village
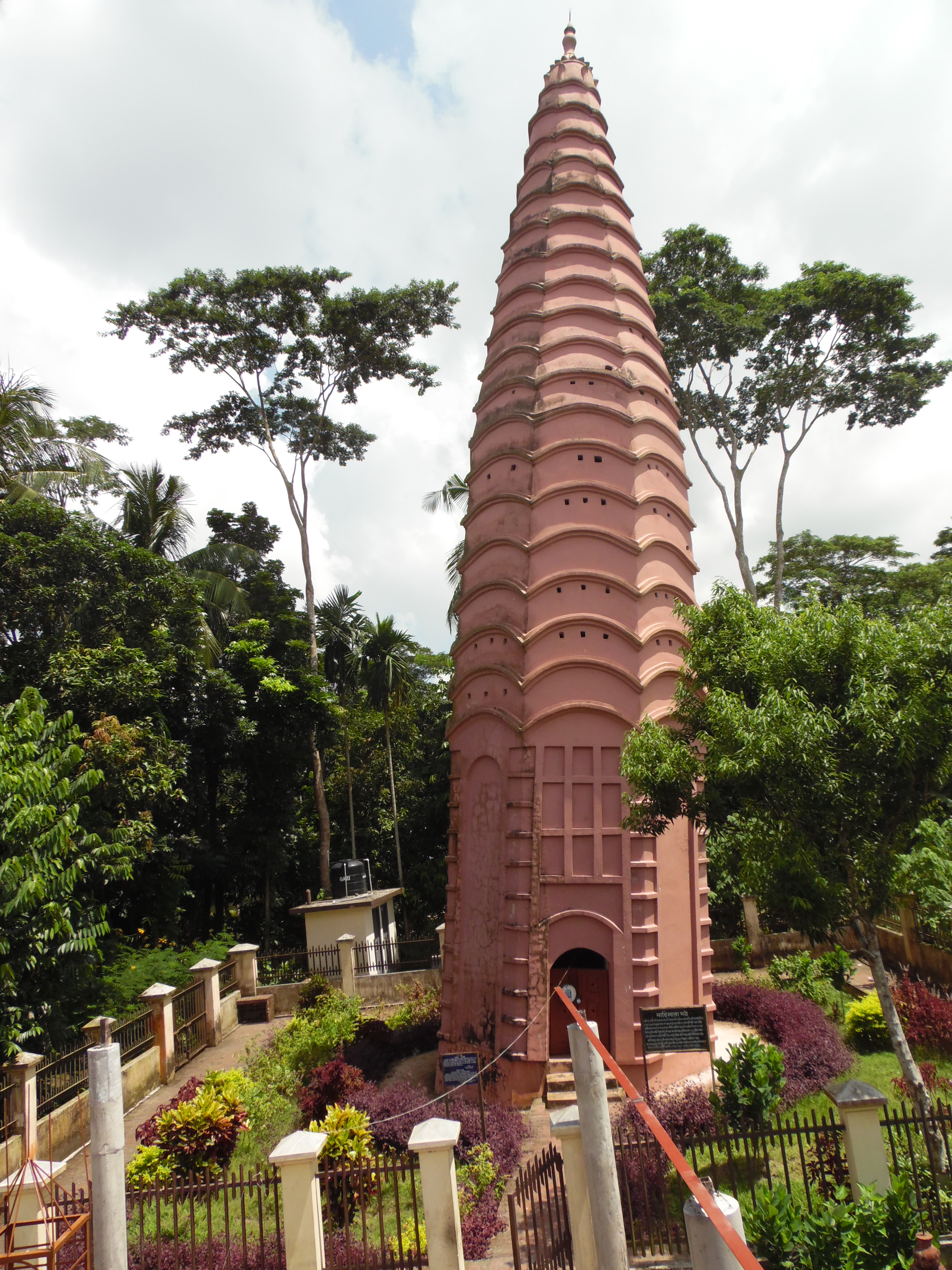
- Mahilara Sarkar Math

- Location in Bangladesh
- Coordinates: 22°56′N 90°16′E
- Country: Bangladesh
- Division: Barisal Division
- District: Barisal District
- Upazila: Gournadi Upazila

Area
  - Total: 2.08 km^{2} (0.80 sq mi)

Population (2022)
  - Total: 2,594
  - Density: 1,250/km^{2} (3,230/sq mi)
- Time zone: UTC+6 (Bangladesh Time)

Mahilara is a village in Gournadi Upazila of Barisal District in the Barisal Division of southern-central Bangladesh.

According to the 2022 Census of Bangladesh, Mahilara had 640 households and a population of 2,594. It has a total area of 2.08 km^{2} (0.80 sq mi).

== Notable people ==
- Rabindra Kumar Das Gupta
