= Khanbari Old Jame Mosque Complex =

Mosque in Rajapur, Jhalokathi, Bangladesh

Khanbari Mosque Complex
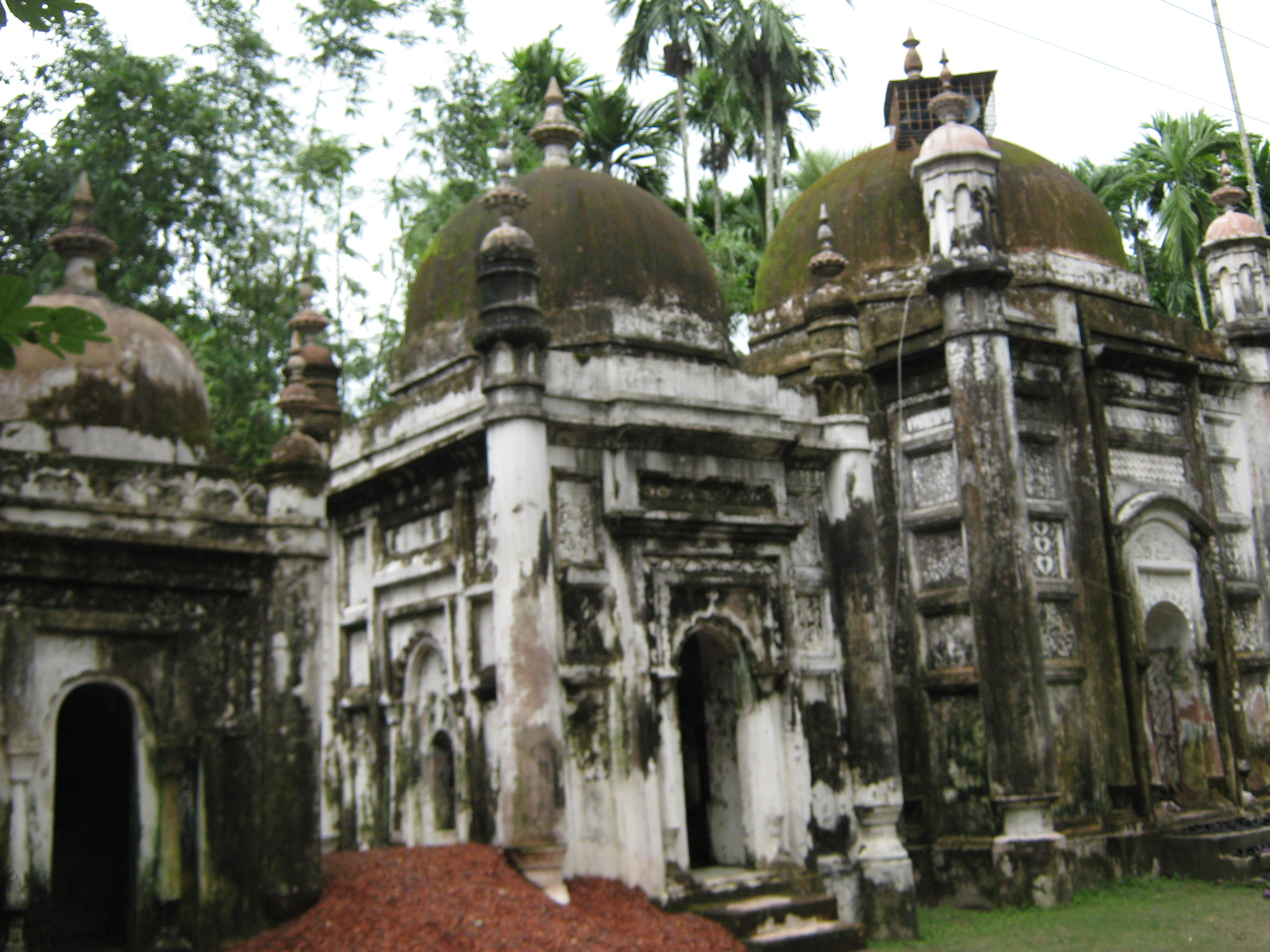
- Three mosques of the same design at Khanbari in 2018

Religion
- Affiliation: Islam
- District: Jhalokathi District
- Ownership: Department of Archaeology
- Status: Active

Location
- Location: Angaria, Rajapur Upazila
- Country: Bangladesh
- Interactive map of Khanbari Mosque Complex
- Coordinates: 22°32′48.80″N 90°09′07.30″E; Obtained from the Department of Archaeology

Architecture
- Style: Mughal style

Specifications
- Capacity: 21 (main mosque)
- Dome: 3 (1 per mosque)
- Minaret: 12 (4 per mosque)
- Department of Archaeology preserved monument ID: BD-A-25-16

Khanbari Mosque Complex (Bengali: খাঁনবাড়ী মসজিদ কমপ্লেক্স) consists of three separate single-room ancient Jami mosquees. Built side by side in the same architectural design, the mosques are located about 2.5 kilometers from the Rajapur Upazila center in the village of East Angaria, in front of the house of local Asmat Ali Khan. The site is listed by the Department of Archaeology of Bangladesh as a protected monument under the name Khanbari Old Jame Mosque Complex.

== History ==
In the first half of the 18th century, after Asar Khan and Kishor Khan, ancestors of Asmat Ali Khan, came to Rajapur from Afghanistan to promulgate Islam, the mosques were built through the initiative of Kishor Khan. The construction period is unknown, but the architectural features are of the Mughal style, which indicates that the mosques were built during the Mughal era.

On 13 October 2005, the complex was declared a protected monument through a notification in the Bangladesh Gazette. It was restored once in 2007.

== Description ==
The mosque buildings are constructed side by side from south to north in the same design. The first is small, the middle one larger, and the third is the largest. Each mosque has a distinct name — ‘Allah’, ‘Muhammad’, and ‘Fatema’. After establishment, the main mosque was used for prayer, while the other two were used for special worship and spiritual activities. Currently, only the main mosque is active, accommodating 21 people in three rows. The smaller mosques are no longer in use. On the south side of the complex is the tomb of Kishor Khan, and to the east, an old pond with a ghat for ablution.

== Architecture ==
The Khanbari mosques are architectural examples of Mughal style, built in the same form and design. Each mosque has 1 dome in the center of the roof and 4 octagonal minarets at the corners. The main mosque has two semi-circular arches with windows on the north and south sides; three on the west side, and six small mihrabs on the remaining walls. The domes are ornamented at the apex. Exterior walls are decorated with various designs. The upper parts of the entrances have semi-circular arches. The outer walls of the doors are decorated with intricate carvings. Each entrance has three steps.
