= Mahilara Sarkar Math =

Archaeological site in Barishal District, Bangladesh

- সরকার মঠ, Sarkar bari Math, Radha-Krishna Math, Bakla math, “helano math” and “the leaning Tower of Mahilara”
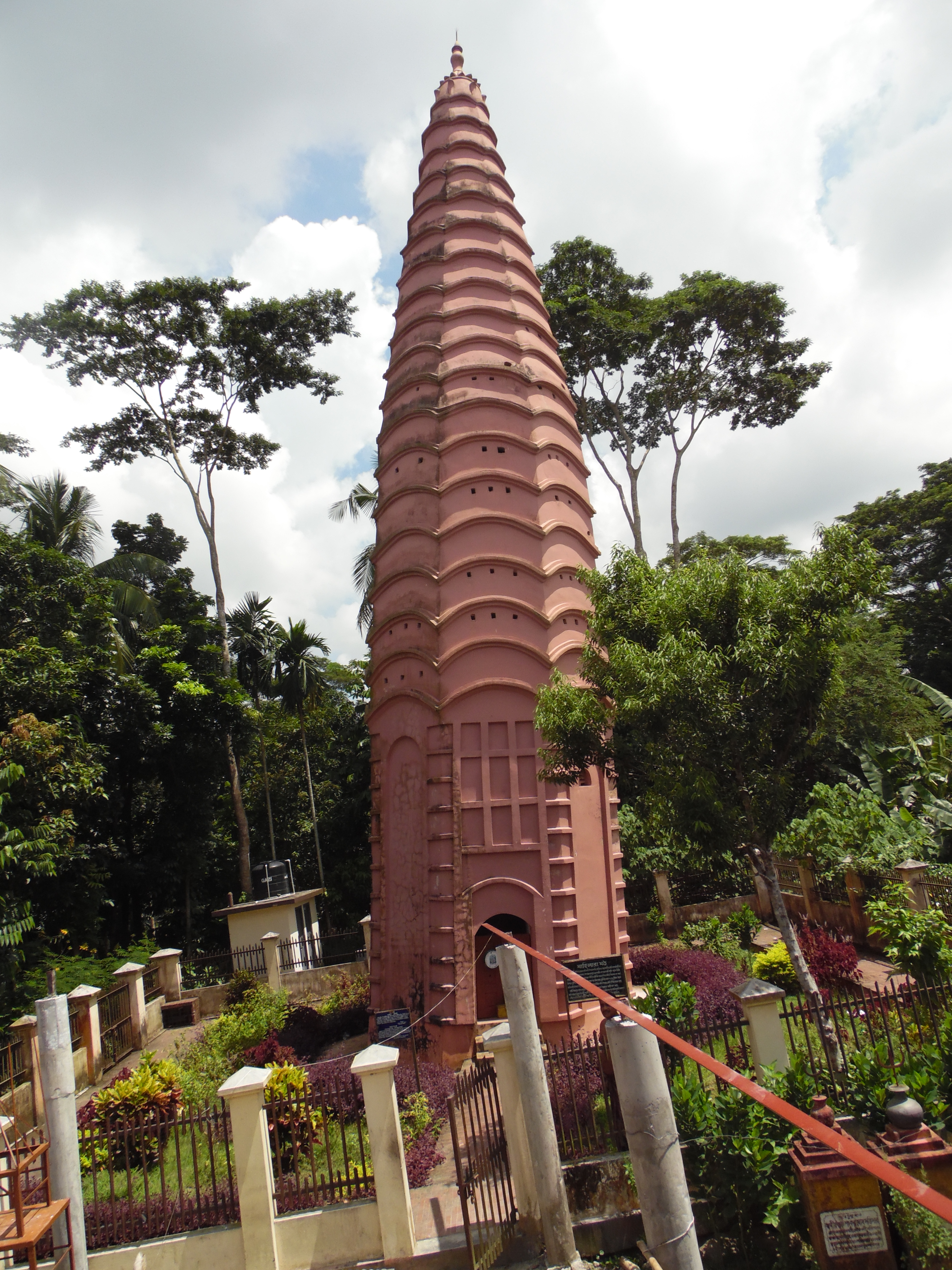

- Location within Bangladesh

Religion
- Affiliation: Hinduism
- Ecclesiastical or organisational status: Hindu temple
- Ownership: Department of Archaeology
- Year consecrated: 18th century
- Status: protected

Location
- Location: Mahilara, Gournadi, Barisal District
- Country: Bangladesh
- Coordinates: 22°55′25.3″N 90°14′45.4″E

Architecture
- Style: Shikhara
- Founder: Sarkar Rup Ram Das Gupta, a local influential man

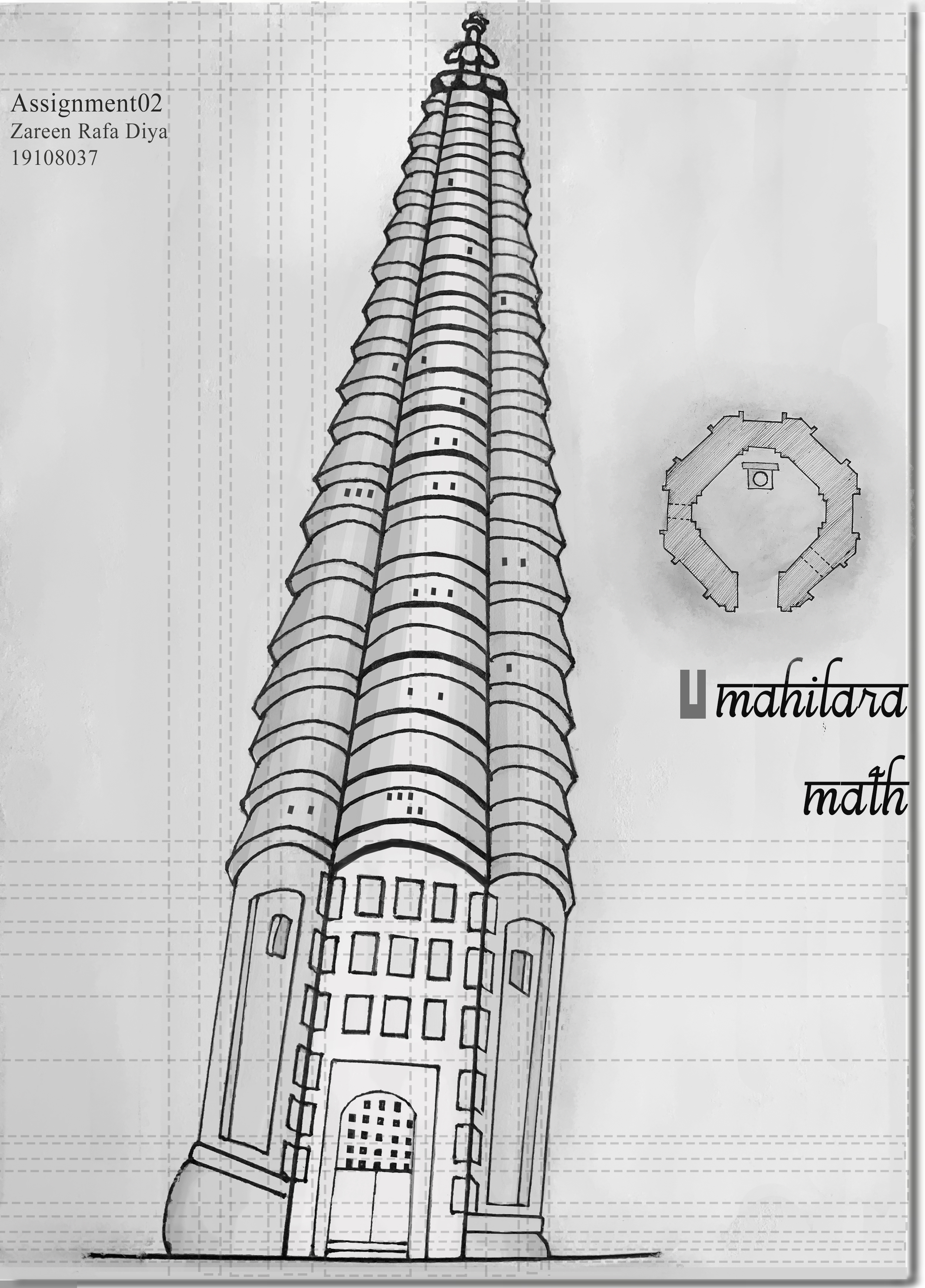
elevation and plan study of Mahilara

Mahilara Sarkar Math is an ancient Hindu temple and archaeological site located in the Barisal District of Bangladesh. It was built by a local influential man named Rupram Das Gupta during the reign of Alivardi Khan in the 18th century. The Shikhara-style monument is now protected by the Department of Archaeology and classified as an 'archaeological monument'.

== History and significance ==
Mahilara Sarkar Math is a 200-year-old lofty temple, built between 1740 and 1756 AD, during the reign of Nawab Alivardi Khan in the Bangla Nawab Era. The temple was initially built to house Lord Shiva. It is undoubtedly a masterpiece of Shikhara temple art, and its high monastery is similar to the Pisa Tower in Italy, as it has a slight tilt due to its construction style and damage sustained over the decades. Despite being attacked several times, during the 1971 war and by local anti-Hindu terrorists, the temple remains standing.

== Architecture and features ==
The Math is an octagonal spire type math with repeated curved cornice, built with brick, stucco, and Terracotta patterns. The brick walls have cement-based mortar, while the stucco plaster masonry and stucco roofing add to the temple's physical features. The math is south-facing and rises to a height of about 27.43 m above a 3.84 m high octagonal base. The temple is built on a square base, over one or two drums or, most commonly, an octagonal lower structure. The lower structure is accompanied by four or more miniature spired turrets at the corner, appearing as a "panch-ratna" or "Navaratnam" pattern influenced style.

The pointed spire of the math leans slightly to the south at an angle of roughly 5.5 degrees, making it a unique example of spired or peaked temple architecture in the Indian subcontinent. The temple's tapered part is ornamented with several bow-shaped cornice decorations, ending in a peak, which are the main attraction of the math. There is a small room inside the temple where the idols are established, with an entrance on the west wall. The panel of the segmental arch over the entrance has numerous geometric designs, which are also present on the other side of the math. The octagonal shaft up to the cornice is divided into several panels. The interior of the temple is adorned with images of Radha-Krishna.

== Distinctive features ==
Mahilara Sarkar Math has several distinctive and significant features. Its repeated bow-shaped cornice decorations are the main attraction of this Shikhara (peaked) Temple Art. The temple was probably built under the influence of European church architecture, where the octagonal spire came into vogue and assumed a variety of terracotta patterns. There are only eight documented temples in Bangladesh with similar architectural styles. The temple's leaning feature is unique and makes it comparable to Italy's leaning Tower of Pisa. In the whole of the Indian subcontinent, there are only three tilted Mandirs, and only one is in Bangladesh, which brings major significance to the structure. The decorations give the temple an eye-catching look and notable heritage value.
