= Angaria, Jhalokati =

Angaria
- Location in Bangladesh
- Coordinates: 22°33′N 90°9′E
- Country: Bangladesh
- Division: Dhaka Division
- District: Shariatpur District
- Time zone: UTC+6 (Bangladesh Time)

Angaria is a Union Parishad in Rajapur Upazila of Jhalokati District in the Dhaka Division of southern-central Bangladesh.
