= Amirullah Munshibari Jame Mosque =

Amirullah Munshi Bari Jame Mosque
- আমিরউল্লাহ মুন্সি বাড়ী জামে মসজিদ
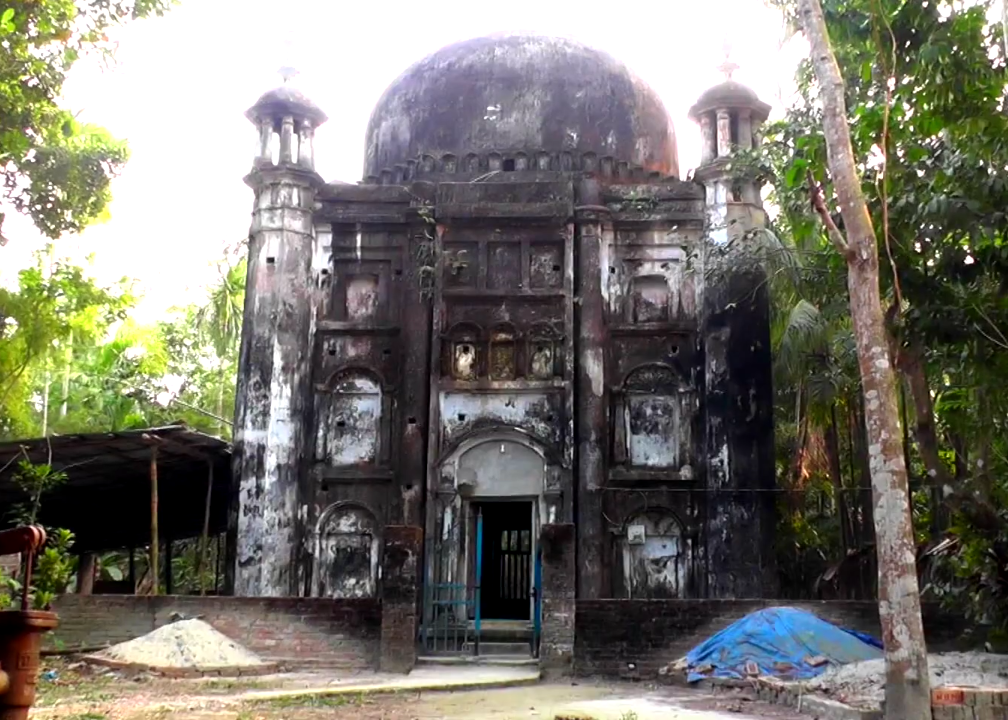

Religion
- Affiliation: Islam
- District: Patuakhali
- Region: Barisal
- Ecclesiastical or organisational status: Mosque
- Ownership: Department of Archaeology
- Status: Preserved

Location
- Location: Adampur, Dashmina
- Country: Bangladesh
- Interactive map of Amirullah Munshi Bari Jame Mosque
- Coordinates: 22.3407204°N 90.5314843°E

Architecture
- Founder: Munshi Amirullah
- Established: Unknown

Amirullah Munshi Bari Jame Mosque is a historic single-domed mosque located in South Adampur village of Dashmina, Patuakhali in Bangladesh.

== History ==
This archaeological mosque was built during the Mughal Empire, estimated to be around 500 years old. It was constructed in 1526 following Mughal architectural style. The mosque is a one-storey lime and brick structure about 40 feet in height. The main building covers approximately 200 square feet and is topped with a single dome.

== Architecture ==
The mosque is about 50 feet tall and supported by 12 pillars. A large central dome crowns the mosque, and there are four medium-sized minarets at each corner. Inside, the floor spans about 15.5 feet from north to south and about 15.25 feet from east to west. The mosque accommodates up to 30 worshippers and an imam in three rows, each holding 10 people. The width of each wall is around 5 feet, making the external dimensions about 25.5 feet in length and 25.25 feet in width.

== Structure ==
The nearly 7.5-meter-long square-plan mosque features walls about 1 meter thick. It has a single dome and four corner minarets.

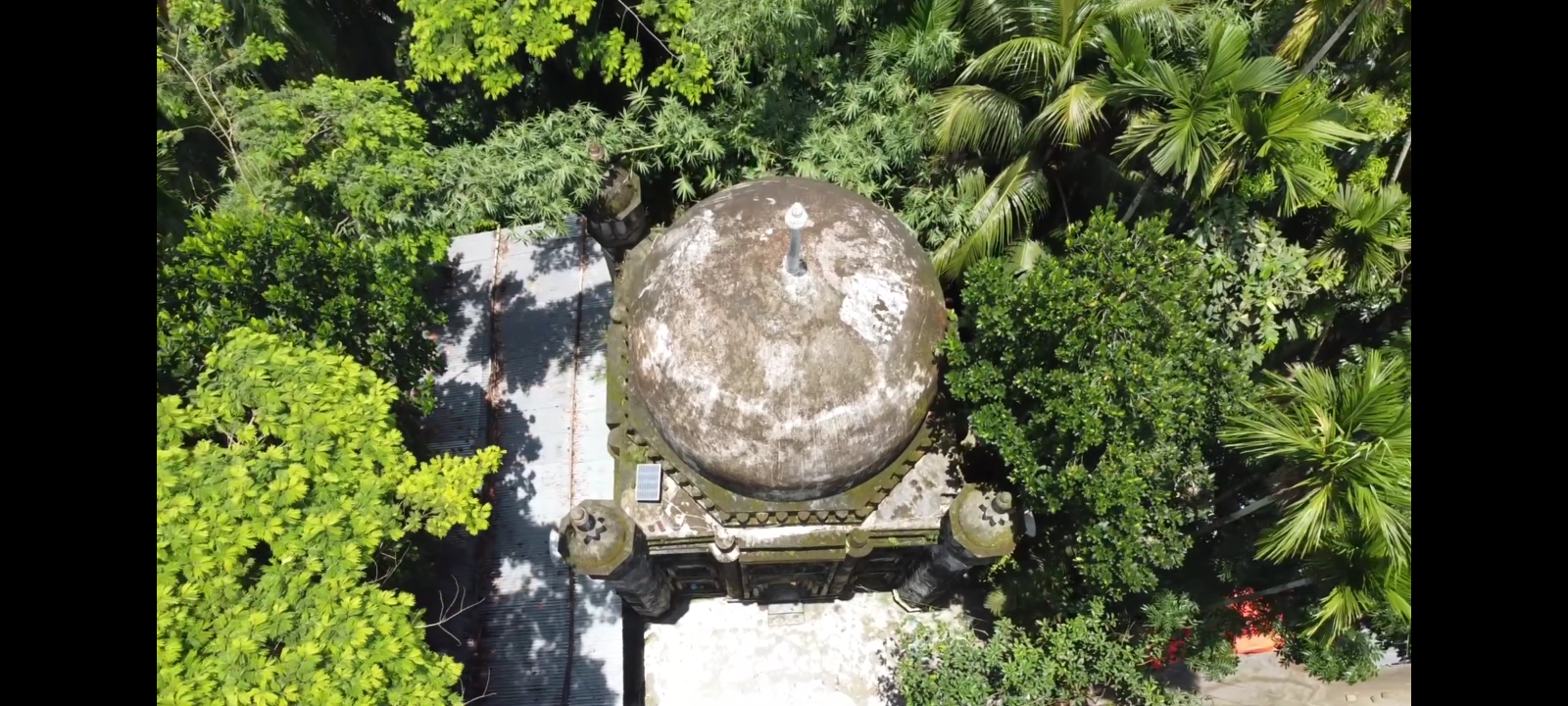
View of the mosque's upper part (dome)

The mosque is adorned with decorative designs along its outer walls. There is one entrance on each of the south, north, and east walls, and a single mihrab on the western interior wall. It is an example of Muslim architecture built in the 18th century CE.
