= Abdul Mannan (Bir Protik) =

Bangladeshi freedom fighter (c.1935–2021)

- Born: c. 1935; Patuakhali District, Bengal Presidency, British India
- Died: November 7, 2021 (aged 85); Alipur, Dashmina Upazila, Patuakhali District, Bangladesh
- Spouse: Mst. Nayon Nesha
- Children: 1 son, 3 daughters
- Military career
- Allegiance: Pakistan (before 1971); Bangladesh (since 1971)
- Branch: Pakistan Army (before 1971); Bangladesh Army (since 1971)
- Service years: 1971–1988
- Rank: constable
- Unit: East Bengal Regiment
- Conflicts: Bangladesh Liberation War
- Awards: Bir Protik

Abdul Mannan (c. 1935 – 7 October 2021) was a decorated veteran of the Bangladesh Liberation War. He first fought in Chittagong and later fought in Patuakhali and Barguna District. In recognition of his bravery, the Government of Bangladesh awarded him the Bir Protik.

== Early life ==
Mannan was born around 1935 in Chandpura village, South Alipur Union, Dashmina Upazila, Patuakhali District. His father was Nur Mohammad Hawlader.

== Military career ==
Prior to the Liberation War, Mannan served in the Pakistan Army East Bengal Regiment as a naik (corporal). He was stationed at the Chittagong Cantonment and joined the liberation effort from there.

After the war, Mannan continued in the Bangladesh Army and was promoted to the rank of havildar (sergeant). He retired from the military on 5 January 1988.

== Role in the Liberation War ==
On the night of 25 March 1971, Mannan was stationed at the Chittagong Cantonment when Pakistani forces surrounded Bengali soldiers and opened fire around 1 am. The Bengalis returned fire and took position in the adjacent Ambagan area. Members of the East Pakistan Rifles (EPR) also joined their ranks.

This resistance marked the beginning of a full-fledged armed struggle. Heavy fighting continued for 4–5 days in Halishahar, Chittagong, followed by an assault at Sitakunda where a strategic bridge was blown up, causing approximately 300 Pakistani casualties.

Towards the end of March, Mannan suffered severe injuries to his left leg and arm from a mortar shell. He lost consciousness and received emergency treatment at a local madrasa. He was later moved to Sandwip and Hatiya in Noakhali for further care. Once partially recovered, he returned to his in-laws’ home in Patuakhali.

After recuperating, Mannan rejoined the liberation forces, fighting in various locations across Patuakhali and Barguna. He played a key role in the liberation of Patuakhali on 8 December. In retaliation, Pakistani forces and collaborators burned down his home.

== Death ==
Mannan died on the night of 7 October 2021 at his residence at the age of 85. On 8 October, a state‑honoured funeral prayer was held at the local mosque grounds, after which he was laid to rest in the family graveyard.
