= Government Brojomohun College =

College in Barishal, Bangladesh

Govt. Brojomohun College, Barishal
- সরকারি ব্রজমোহন কলেজ, বরিশাল
- Motto: সত্য, প্রেম ও পবিত্রতা
- Motto in English: Truth, Love and Purity
- Type: Public
- Established: 14 June 1889; 137 years ago
- Founder: Ashwini Kumar Dutta
- Affiliations: Bangladesh National University
- Academic affiliations: Barisal Education Board (HSC)
- Principal: Professor Dr. Sheikh Md. Tazul Islam
- Vice Principal: Professor Abu Taher Mohammad Rashedul Islam
- Academic staff: 152
- Administrative staff: 23
- Students: 27,494
- Undergraduates: 21,720
- Postgraduates: 4,774
- Other students: 1,000 (HSC)
- Location: B.M. College Campus, Barisal, 8200, Bangladesh; 22.7121°N 90.3565°E
- Campus: 60 acres (24 ha); Urban
- Language: Bengali
- Website: bmcollege.gov.bd

Govt. Brojomohun College (commonly known as B.M. College) is one of the oldest institutions of higher education in Bangladesh. It is located in the city of Barishal in south-western Bangladesh.

== History ==
On June 14, 1889, Ashwini Kumar Dutta founded Brojo Mohan College, which was named after his father, Brajamohan Dutta.

The first principal of the college was Babu Gyan Chandra Chowdhury. While Ashwini Kumar Dutta taught English and logic, Kali Prasanna Ghosh taught history and Kamini Kumar Bidya Ratna taught Sanskrit and Bengali. In 1898, BM College was transformed into a "First Grade College" from a "Second Grade College". In 1912, the college went to government management from personal management strategy. In the beginning the college used the BM School campus and was relocated its own present complex sometime later.

BM College, affiliated to University of Calcutta, started honours course in English and philosophy in 1922, in Sanskrit and mathematics in 1925, in chemistry in 1928, and in economics in 1929. The time from 1922 to 1948 is called the "Golden Period" of the college. The governor of Bengal at that time, Sir Udbarn, once commented on BM College, "The college promises some day to challenge the supremacy of the metropolitan (Presidency) College."

After the partition of India creation of Pakistan in 1947, the college lacked teachers and the student body fell to one third of its post-war size. This made it difficult to teach the same numbers of courses and as a result the two year Honors curriculum conducted by Calcutta University was replaced with the three Honors curriculum of Dhaka University. As a consequence, Honors courses except Mathematics were abolished in 1950. In 1952, Honors in mathematics had also been discontinued. In 1964, Honors in economics restarted. Several other Honors and Masters Courses started between 1972 and 2005.

The time since 1965 has been called the "Age of Enrichment" of the college. There are 20 degree (pass) courses, 22 Honors courses and 22 Masters courses at BM College.Most recently, on 10 January 2014, the Department of Statistics introduced the Honours Program with only 11 students under the initiative of its founding Head, Professor Biplab Kumar Bhattacharjee, , the Master's Program was launched on 18 February 2026. Professor Biplab Kumar Bhattacharjee, under the leadership of Principal Professor S. M. Imanul Hakim, played a key role in reopening the Science Group at the Higher Secondary level in 2016.

== Academic departments ==
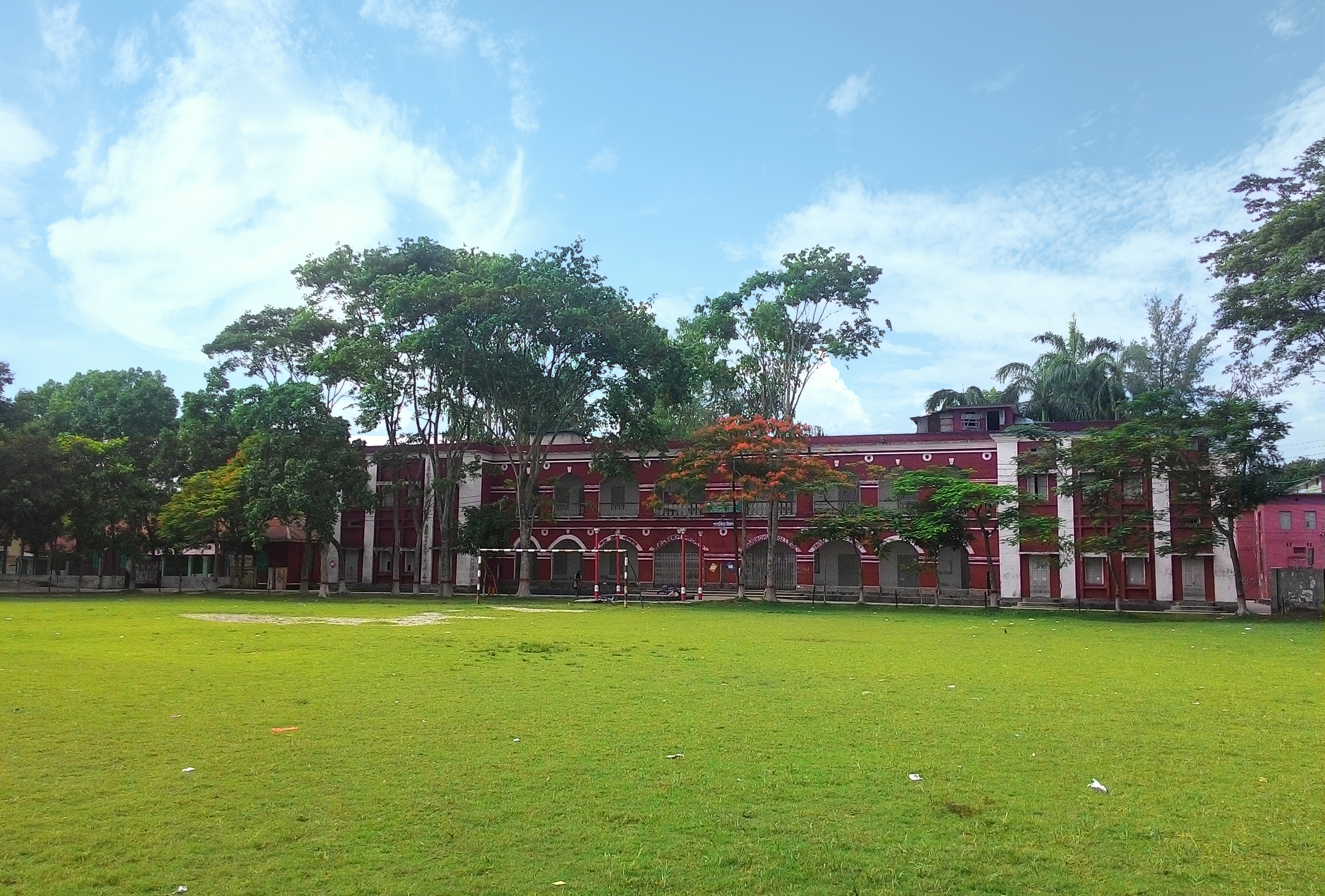
Main building

The university has 22 departments under 4 faculties. The faculties are:

=== Faculty of Arts ===
- Department of Bangla
- Department of English
- Department of History
- Department of Philosophy
- Department of Islamic Studies
- Department of Islamic History and Culture
- Department of Sanskrit

=== Faculty of Business Studies ===
- Department of Finance & Banking
- Department of Accounting
- Department of Marketing
- Department of Management

=== Faculty of Science ===
- Department of Botany
- Department of Chemistry
- Department of Mathematics
- Department of Physics
- Department of Soil Science
- Department of Statistics
- Department of Zoology

=== Faculty of Social Sciences ===
- Department of Economics
- Department of Sociology
- Department of Political Science
- Department of Social Work

=== Higher Secondary Department ===
- Science
- Arts
- Commerce

== Co-curricular activities ==
- Bangladesh Rover Scout
- Bangladesh National Cadet Corps - Sundarban Regiment
- Uttoron Cultural Organization
- Cultural Council
- Brojomohun Theatre
- Badhan Foundation
- Sandhani
- Brojomohun College Film Society
- Brojomohun College Debating Club (BMCDC)

== Notable alumni ==
- Jibanananda Das, poet, writer, novelist and essayist
- Abdul Wahab Khan, third Speaker of the National Assembly of Pakistan
- Jogendra Nath Mandal, Law minister in Interim Government of India and Pakistan's first law and labour minister
- Wali Gandhi (1907-1978), journalist, writer, and political activist
- Bir Sreshtho Mohiuddin Jahangir, awarded the highest recognition of bravery in the Bangladesh Army
- Shaheed (Martyr) Lieutenant Commander Moazzem Hossain, accused of Agartala Conspiracy Case and awarded Independence Day Award, the highest state award given by the government of Bangladesh
- Altaf Mahmud, musician, cultural activist and martyred freedom fighter
- Promode Dasgupta, West Bengal State Secretary of the CPI(M)
- Narayan Gangopadhyay, South Asian author
- Ahsan Habib, poet and writer
- Hafiz Ahmed Mazumder, businessman, educationist and politician
- Sheikh Fazlul Haque Mani, Politician, Founder of Mujib Bahini and Jubo League
- Siraj Sikder Politician, Communist revolutionary
- Professor Biplab Kumar Bhattacharjee introduced the Honours and Master's courses in the Department of Statistics.
- Shawkat Hossain Hiron, Bangladeshi Politician

== Notable faculty members ==
- Jibanananda Das, taught English
- Kabir Chowdhury, former principal
- Professor Biplab Kumar Bhattacharjee introduced the Honours and Master's courses in the Department of Statistics. Also he reestablished HSC course in 2016.
