= Qasba Mosque =

Archaeological site located in Gournadi, Barishal, Bangladesh

- কসবা মসজিদ
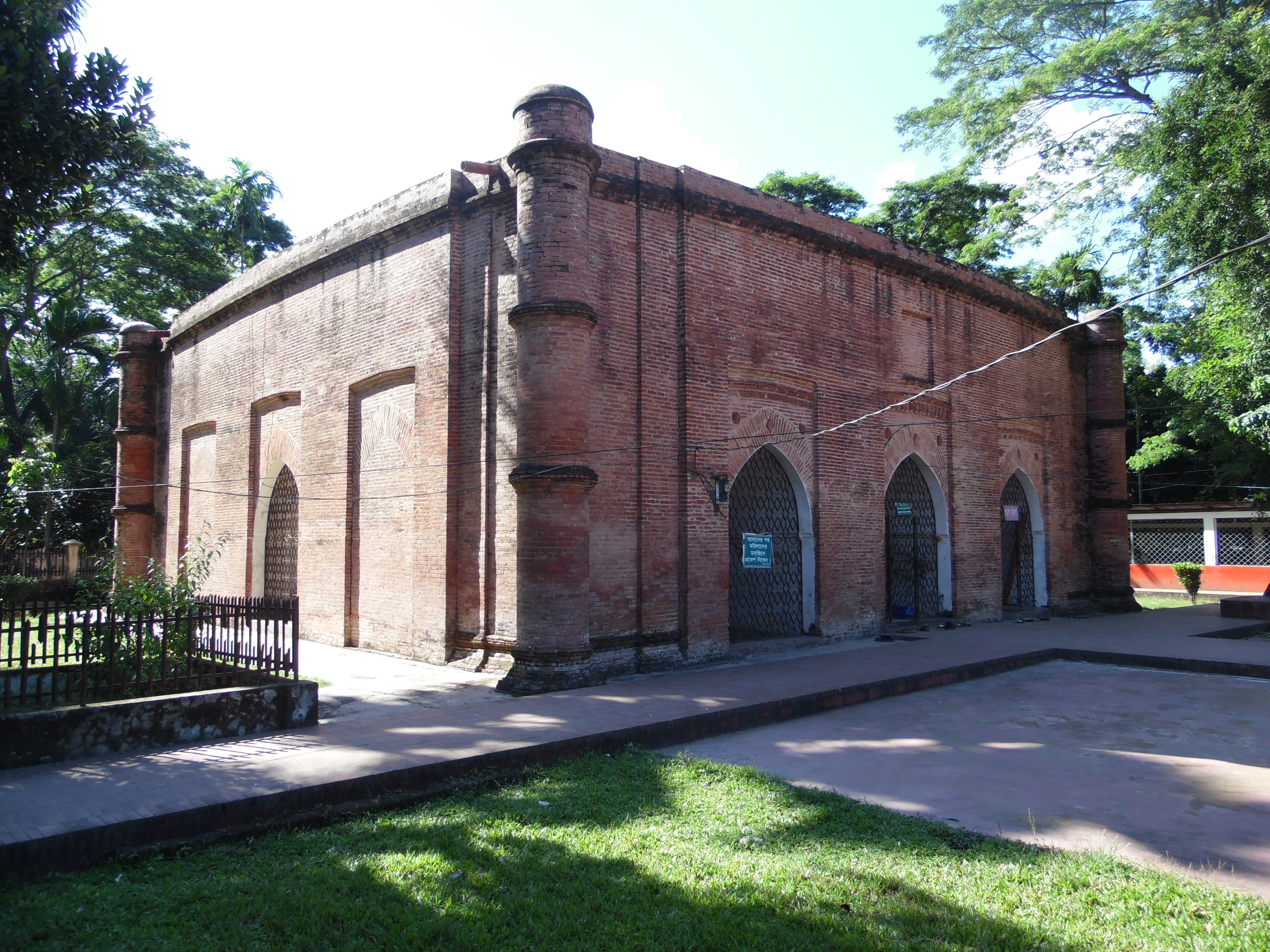

- Location of the mosque in Bangladesh

Religion
- Affiliation: Islam
- Ecclesiastical or organisational status: Mosque
- Status: Protected

Location
- Location: Gournadi, Barisal District
- Country: Bangladesh
- Administration: Department of Archaeology
- Coordinates: 22°59′21″N 90°13′15″E

Architecture
- Type: Mosque architecture
- Style: Bengal Sultanate
- Completed: 16th century

Specifications
- Length: 11.68 m (38.3 ft)
- Width: 11.68 m (38.3 ft)
- Dome: Nine
- Minaret: Four

The Qasba Mosque (Bengali: কসবা মসজিদ, Arabic: مسجد القصبة) is an early 16th-century mosque and archaeological site located in Gournadi, in the Barisal District of Bangladesh. The mosque is located in the village of Qasba; hence its naming. The mosque, which has a total of nine domes, is very similar in design to the Nine Dome Mosque in Bagerhat.

== History ==
The village of Qasba was an important center in the Sultanate of Bengal and was home to several influential Muslim families. The mosque was constructed in the early 16th century, during the reign of Alauddin Husain Shah. The earlier Nine Dome Mosque built by Khan Jahan Ali in Khalifatabad is considered to be Qasba Mosque's inspiration due to the striking similarities. Despite the mosque's Sultanate origins, locals often credit the mosque to Sabi Khan, the Mughal faujdar of Bakla who built several mosques and roads in the region. In active use, the mosque is a protected monument by Bangladeshi Department of Archaeology.

== Architecture ==
The mosque has nine domes and four minars. The mosque measures 11.68 square metres (125.7 sq ft) and the walls are 2.18 metres (7 ft 2 in) wide. There are three archways on the east side and one arch on each north and south side. The arches are decorated with terracotta paintings. It has four stone pillars inside.

== Gallery ==
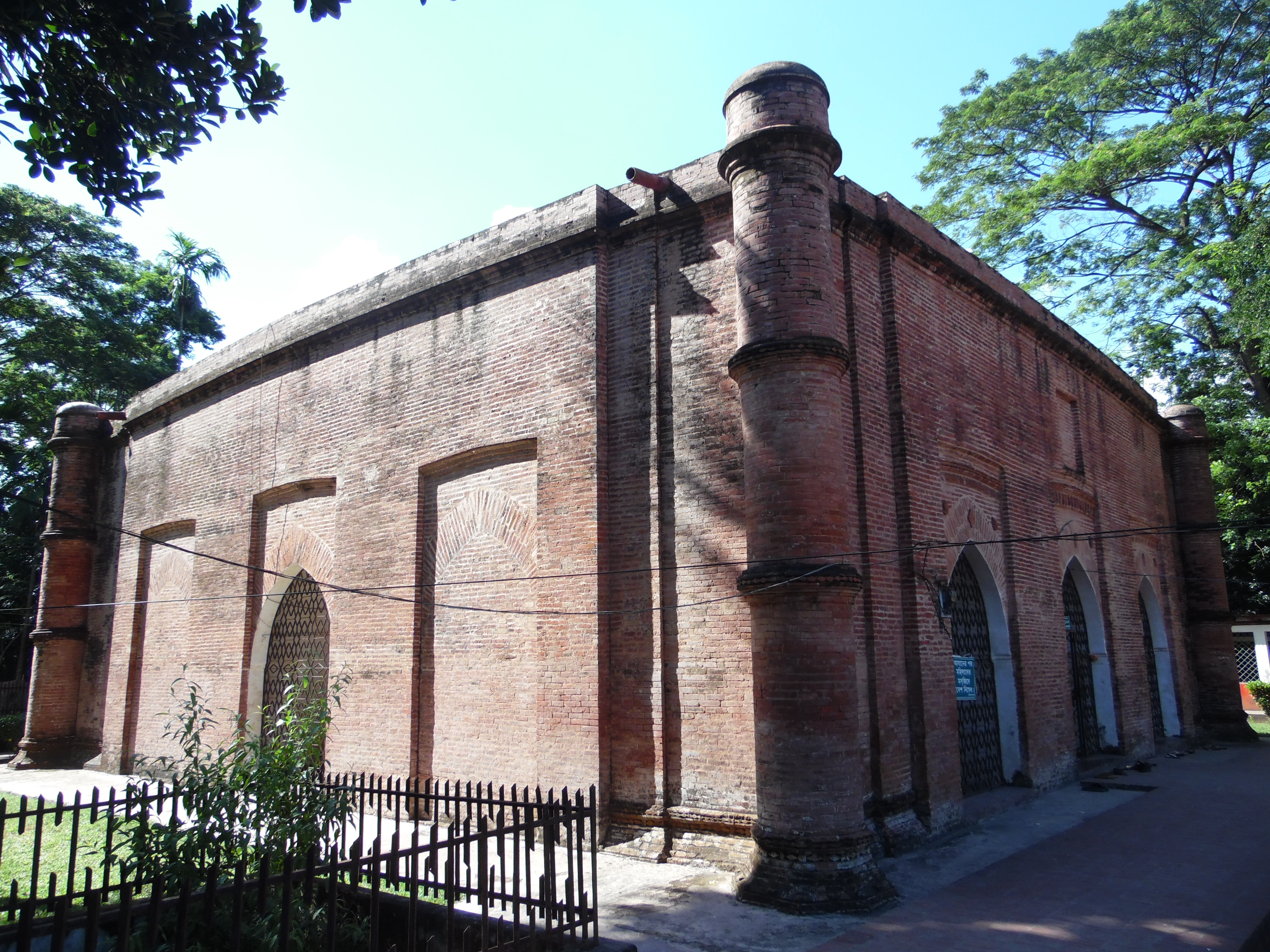

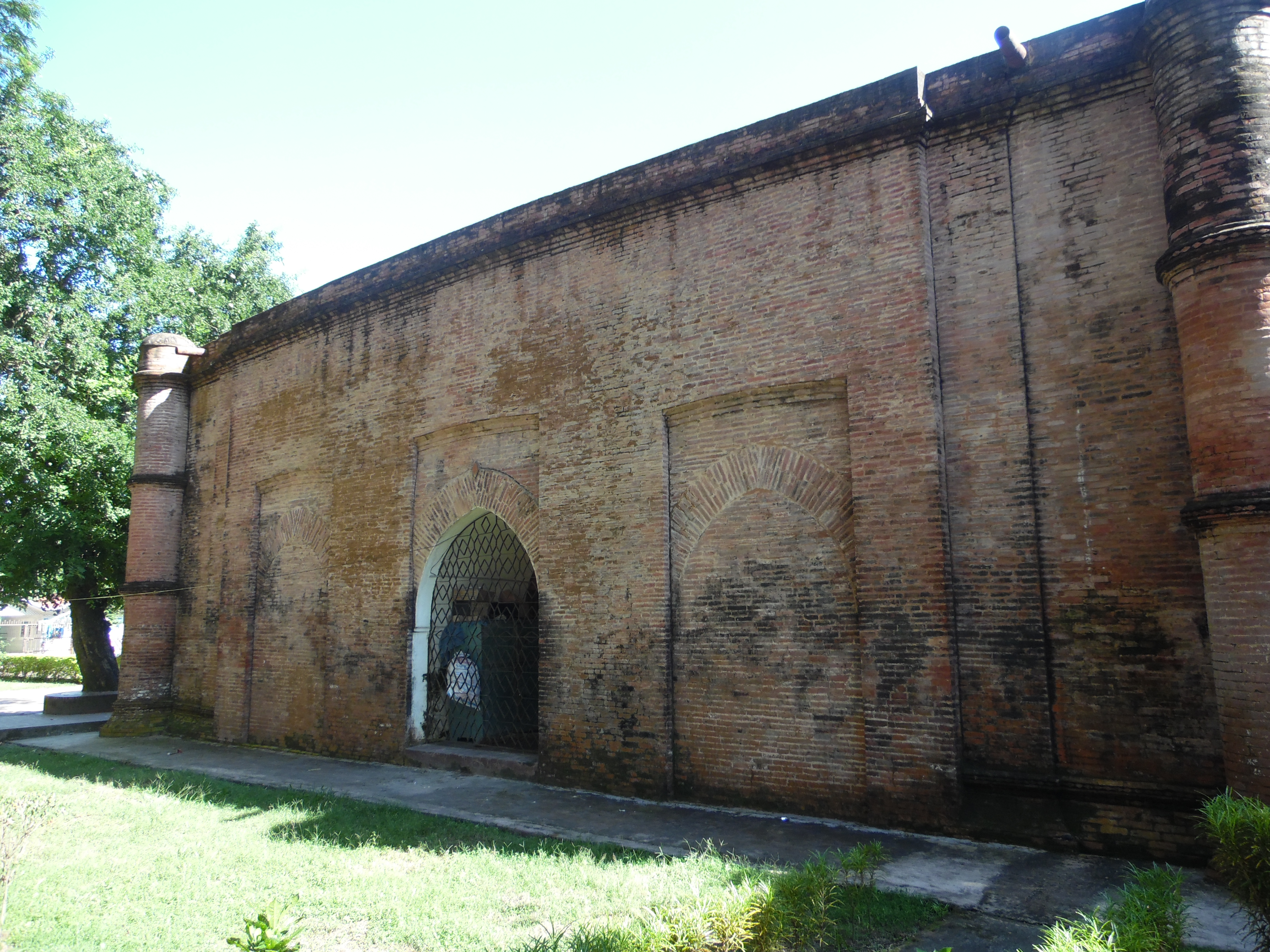

== See also ==
- Islam in Bangladesh
- List of mosques in Bangladesh
- List of archaeological sites in Bangladesh
