= Ashwini Kumar Dutta =

Bangladeshi politician and educator

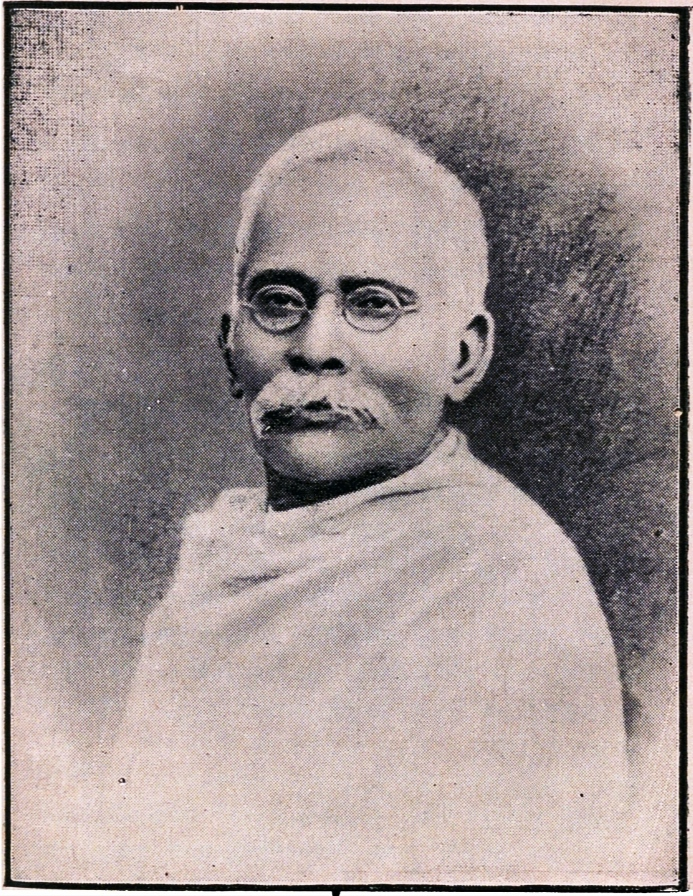
- Ashwini Kumar Dutta
- Born: 25 January 1856; Batajor, Bengal Presidency, British India
- Died: 7 November 1923 (aged 67); Calcutta, Bengal Presidency, British India
- Occupations: Educationist, philanthropist
- Parent: Brajamohan Dutta

Ashwini Kumar Dutta (25 January 1856 – 7 November 1923) was an Indian educationist, philanthropist, social reformer and an Indian independence activist.

== Early life ==
Ashwini Kumar Dutta was born in an affluent high class Bengali Hindu Kayastha Bharadwaja clan Dutta family in Batajore village in the district of Barisal in Bengal, now in Bangladesh on 25 January 1856. They are a branch of Dutta family of Bally. His father Brajamohan Dutta was a Munsiff and a Deputy Collector who later became a District Judge. He passed the Entrance examination from Rangpur in 1870 and completed his F.A. from Hindu College. He went to Allahabad to study law. After that, he came back to Bengal and completed his M.A. and B.L. from Krishnagar Government College.

== Career ==
Dutta started his career as a teacher at the Krishnanagar Collegiate School in 1878. In the next year, he joined Chatra Nandalal Institution at Serampore and acted as the Headmaster of the school for seven months. In 1880, he was called to the Bar at Barisal. He built up a lucrative practice and expended his earnings in philanthropic activities. At the suggestion of Ramesh Chandra Dutta, the then Magistrate of Barisal, he established the Brojomohun School in the memory of his father, on 27 June 1884. Ashwini Kumar Dutta was elected as a delegate to the second session of Indian National Congress, held at Kolkata in 1886. He took the initiative to establish the District Board in Barisal in 1887. He established the Bakarganj Hitaishini Sabha and a girls' school in the same year. That year he attended the third session of Indian National Congress in Chennai and spoke on the need for reforms in the Legislative Council. In 1888, he was appointed the Vice-Chairman of Barisal Municipality. In 1889, he established the Brojomohun College as a second-grade college. He served as the honorary lecturer of English at the college for 25 years. In 1897, he was appointed the Chairman of Barisal Municipality. In 1898, he was selected amongst the committee that was empowered to draw up a constitution of the Congress.

The Partition of Bengal drew him to the Swadeshi movement. He founded the Swadesh Bandhab Samiti to promote the consumption of indigenous products and boycott foreign goods. When the moderates and the extremists parted ways in the Surat session, he attempted a reconciliation between the two groups. In 1908, the government of the newly formed Eastern Bengal and Assam banned the Swadesh Bandhab Samiti 1908 and deported him to the United Provinces where he was interred at the Lucknow jail. After his release in 1910, he concentrated on sustaining the Brojomohun School and Brojomohun College. He had no other way than to accept government aid. In 1912, he was forced to hand over the management of the school and the college to two different trustee councils. In 1918 he attended the Bombay session of the Indian National Congress. He actively undertook relief work after the Barisal cyclone of 1919. In 1921 at the Kolkata session of the Indian National Congress, he lends the non-violent Non-Cooperation Movement. Mohandas Gandhi arrived in Barisal that year to show respect to the great leader. In 1922, he joined the striking workers of Assam Bengal Railway and Steamer Company in protest against the atrocities on the workers of tea plantations of Assam.

== Works ==
Aswini Kumar Dutta is the founder of Brojomohan college named after his father.

Dutta has written a number of books in Bengali on religion, philosophy, and patriotism.

- Bhaktiyoga
- Karmayoga
- Prem
- Durgotsavtattva
- Atmapratistha
- Bharatgeeti
