= Gournadi =

- Town and municipality
- Interactive map of Gournadi
- Coordinates: 22°58′N 90°14′E
- Country: Bangladesh
- Division: Barisal Division
- District: Barisal District

Area
  - Total: 11.5 km^{2} (4.4 sq mi)

Population
  - Total: 50,023
  - Density: 4,350/km^{2} (11,300/sq mi)
- Time zone: UTC+6 (BST)

Gournadi is a town and paurashava situated in the Barisal District, south-central Bangladesh.

== See also ==
- Gournadi Upazila
