= Saturia Zamindar Bari =

Birthplace of A. K. Fazlul Huq
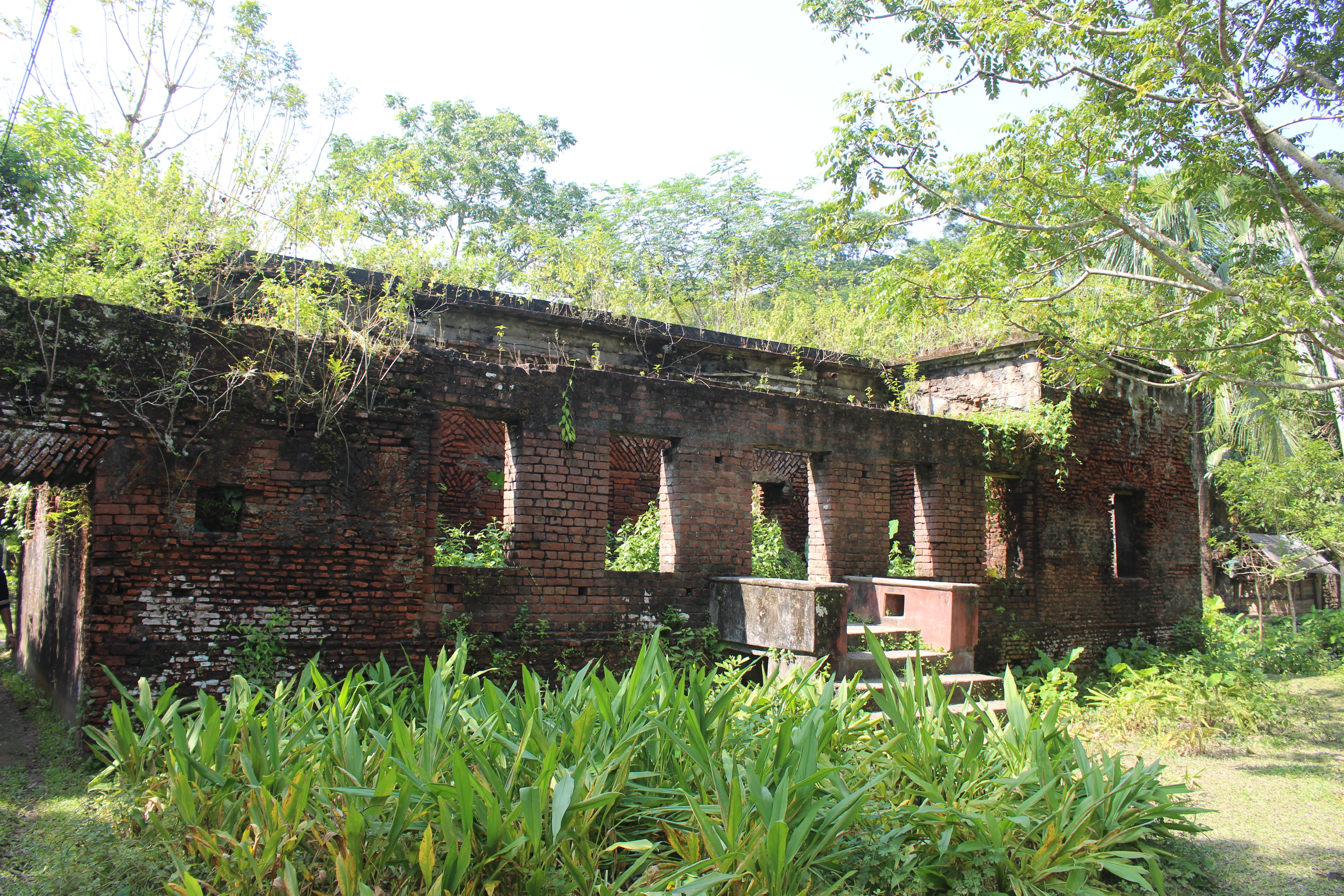
- Type: Archaeological site
- Location: Rajapur Upazila, Jhalokathi District
- Area: Barisal Division
- Owner: Department of Archaeology (Bangladesh)

The birthplace of A. K. Fazlul Huq, also known as Saturia Zamindar Bari, is a protected heritage site located in the Rajapur Upazila of Jhalokathi District, Bangladesh. It is located in the village of Saturia in the upazila.

== History ==
The Saturia Zamindar Bari is the birthplace of Sher-e-Bangla A. K. Fazlul Huq, who was born here on 26 October 1873. It is believed that the Zamindar Bari was established in the 17th century. The house belonged to the mother of Fazlul Huq. He spent his childhood here at his maternal home and received his early education at the local Maktab (elementary school) situated within the compound. Apart from his early years, he also spent a significant portion of his professional and political life here.

Fazlul Huq’s maternal grandfather, Ali Mia, established the zamindari in this region and is believed to have founded this house.

== Architecture ==
The entire Zamindar Bari complex covers an area of about 100 acres. The complex includes ponds, gardens, and several buildings. The main compound, built in Mughal architectural style, consists of three buildings, each decorated with Mughal-style designs on the walls. The main compound has a prominent entrance gate. The structures were constructed using a mixture of lime, mortar, and bricks. Today, only the ruins of the original buildings remain.

In memory of Sher-e-Bangla, several establishments, including the Sher-e-Bangla Memorial Library, have been set up in and around the compound. The descendants of Ali Mia currently maintain the property.
