= Kamalapur Mosque =

Archaeological site located in Barishal District

- কমলাপুর মসজিদ
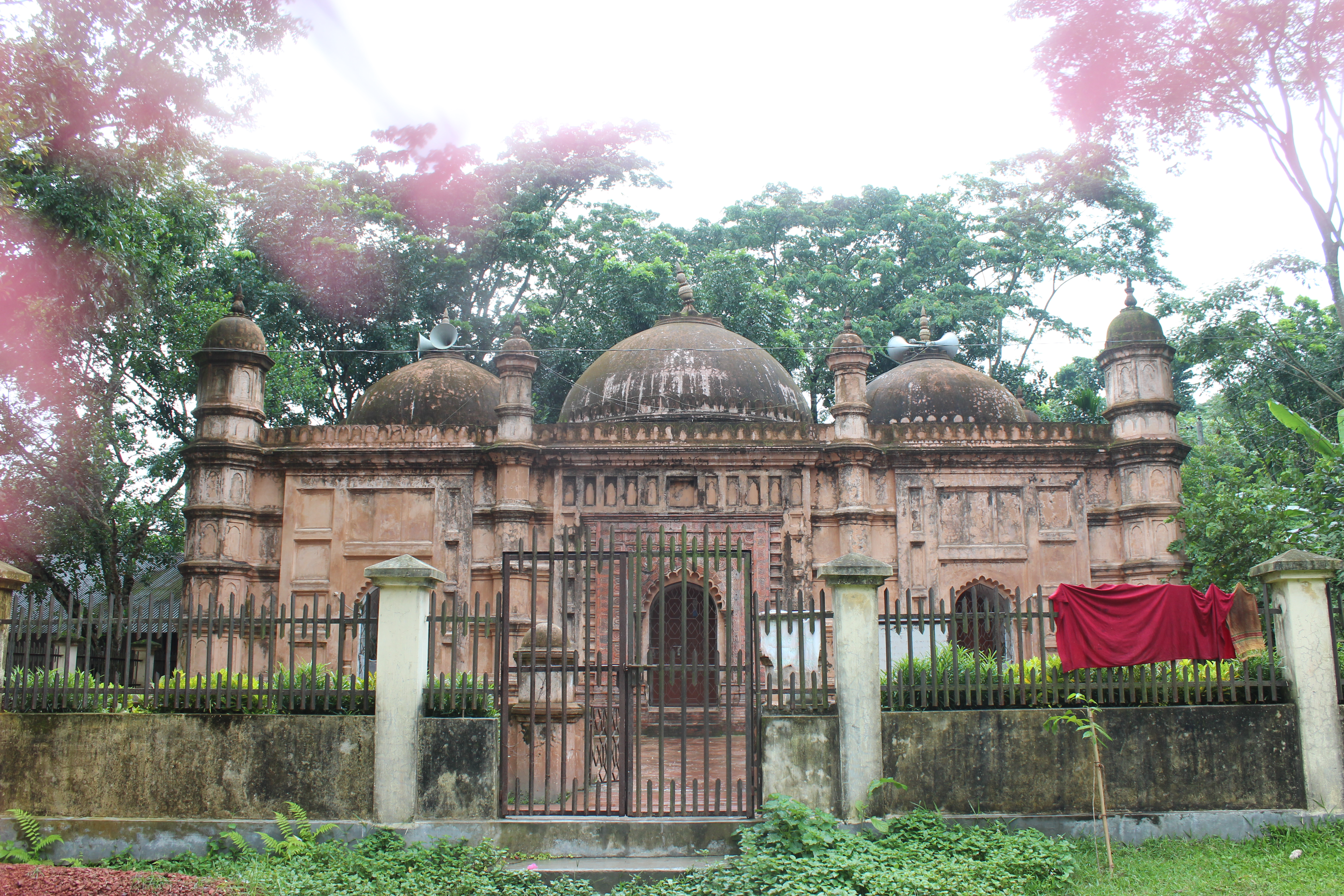

- Location of the mosque in Bangladesh

Religion
- Affiliation: Islam
- Ecclesiastical or organisational status: Mosque
- Status: Active

Location
- Location: Gournadi, Barisal District
- Country: Bangladesh
- Administration: Department of Archaeology
- Coordinates: 23°02′48″N 90°13′41″E

Architecture
- Type: Mosque architecture
- Style: Mughal
- Founder: Masum Khan
- Completed: 16th century

Specifications
- Length: 17.22 m (56.5 ft)
- Width: 8.08 m (26.5 ft)
- Dome: Three
- Minaret: Two

The Kamalapur Mosque, (Bengali: কমলাপুর মসজিদ) also known as Masum Khan Mosque, (Bengali: মাসুম খাঁ মসজিদ) is a square-shaped, three-domed ancient mosque and archaeological site located in Barisal District of Bangladesh. It is located in the Kamalapur village under Gournadi Upazila. It was built in the Mughal style, by a zamindar Masum Khan during the 16th century.

== History ==
The mosque has been a protected monument under the Department of Archaeology since 1975.

== Features ==
The walls of the mosque are 1.83 metres (6 ft 0 in) thick, 17.22 metres (56.5 ft) long, to the north–south, and 8.08 metres (26.5 ft) wide, to the east–west. It has five arched doorways, three on the east and one each on the north and south sides. The center arch on the east side is larger than the rest.

== Gallery ==
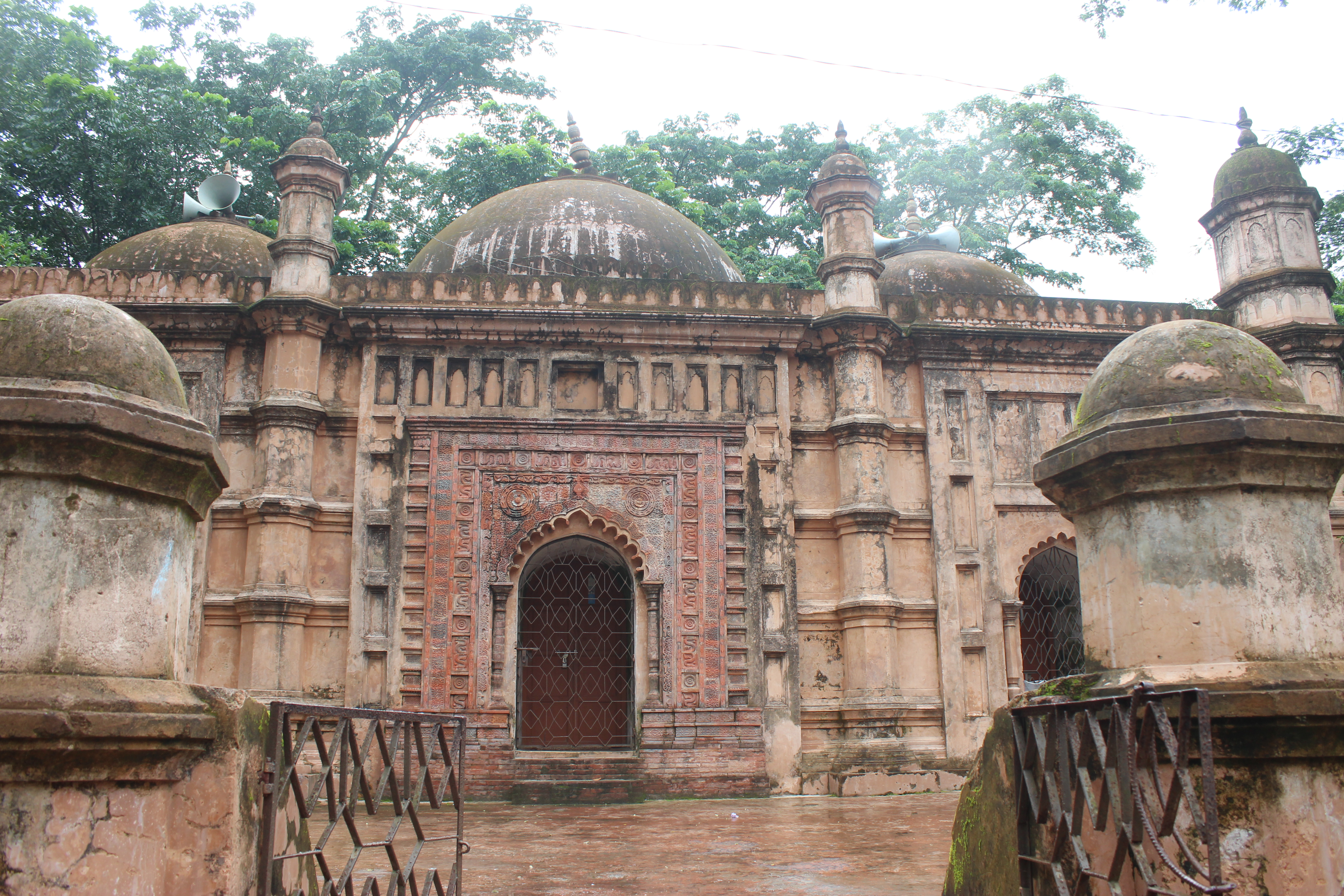

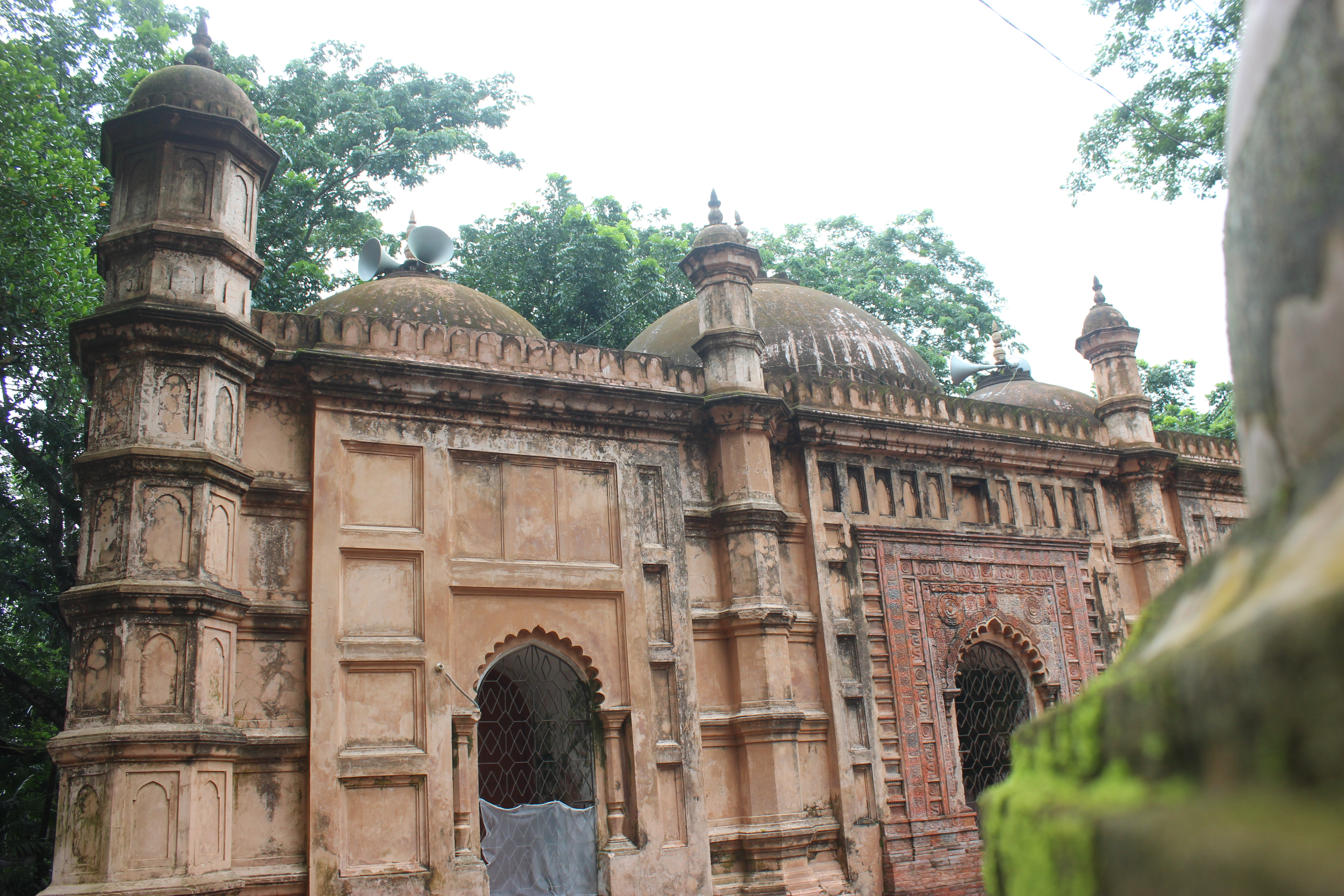

== See also ==
- Islam in Bangladesh
- List of mosques in Bangladesh
- List of archaeological sites in Bangladesh
