= Brajamohan Dutta =

Bengali philanthropist and educator

- Born: 1826; Batajore, Backergunge District, British India
- Died: 1886 (aged 59–60)
- Occupations: Philanthropist, Educator, Judge
- Known for: Promoting education and rural development in Bengal
- Children: Aswini Kumar Dutta

Brajamohan Dutta (1826–1886) was a Bengali philanthropist and educator. He was the father of nationalist politician Aswini Kumar Dutta.

== Early life ==
Dutta was born in 1826 at Batajore village, Barishal, British India. He served as a Deputy Magistrate and Sub-judge at the same time in various district of Bengal.

== Career ==
Dutta was engaged with social work and upliftment of the education and communication system in rural Bengal. In 1867 he played a role to make Patuakhali subdivision. Realizing the demand for an English language education among the people of Barishal he also donated money, founded schools to spread out female education. He retired as a Small Court's Judge in Krishnanagar, Nadia. His son Aswini Kumar was motivated by such contribution of Dutta and established Brajamohan College in 1884 in memoirs of Dutta.
