= Dashmina Upazila =

Dashmina দশমিনা
- Upazila
- Dashmina
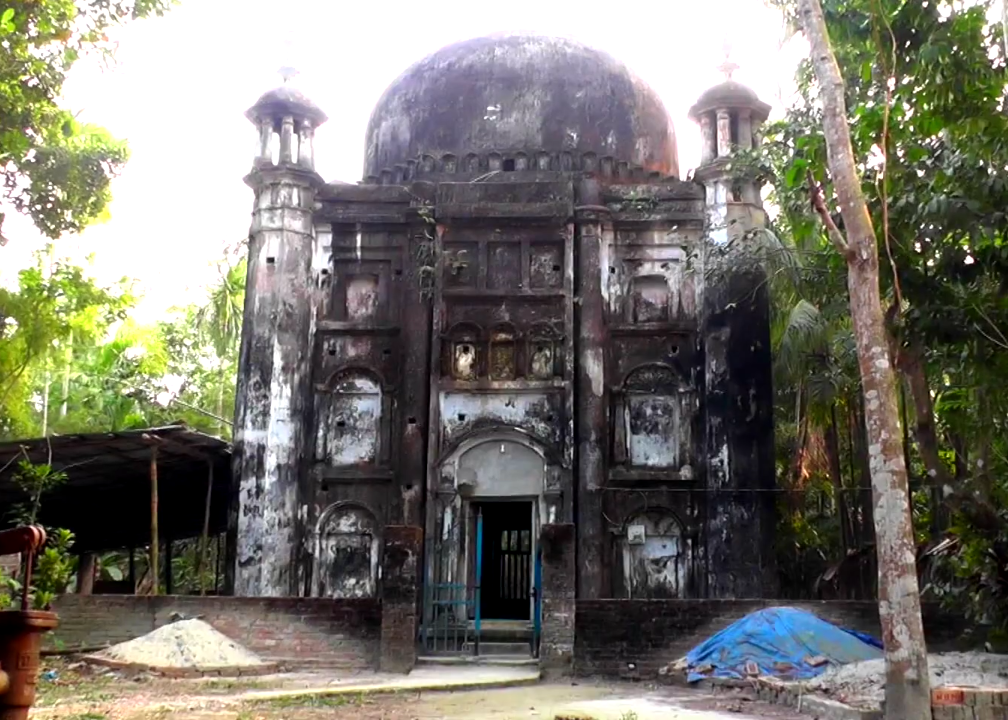
- Amirullah Munshi Bari Jame Mosque, Adampur, Dashmina upazila

- Coordinates: 22°17′N 90°35.4′E
- Country: Bangladesh
- Division: Barisal Division
- District: Patuakhali District

Area
  - Total: 351.87 km^{2} (135.86 sq mi)

Population (2022)
  - Total: 130,402
  - Density: 370.60/km^{2} (959.84/sq mi)
- Time zone: UTC+6 (BST)
- Postal code: 8630
- Area code: 04423
- Website: Official Map of the Doshmina Upazila

Dashmina Upazila mauza geocode map

Dashmina (Bengali: দশমিনা) is an upazila of Patuakhali District in the Division of Barisal, Bangladesh.

== Geography ==
Dashmina is located at 22.2833°N 90.5903°E. It has 28,490 households and a total area of 351.87 km^{2}. The upazila headquarters are situated in Dashmina Sadar. It is situated on the bank of the river Tetulia.

Among the 6 unions of Dashmina including the Sadar at the centre, two of them are in the north of Dashmina Sadar namely Bashbaria and Bahrampur union. Bashbaria is situated on the bank of the river Tetulia. North border of both Bahrampur and Bashbaria union ends up with starting of Baufal upazila. Rono Gopaldi and Betagi Shankipur union is situated on the north western part of Dashmina Sadar and finally the Alipura union covers the southern part of this historic upazila which ends up with starting of Galachipa upazila.

== Demographics ==
Religions in Dashmina Upazila (2022)
Religion	Percent
Islam	93.99%
Hinduism	6.01%
Other or not stated	0.00%

According to the 2022 Bangladeshi census, Dashmina Upazila had 32,967 households and a population of 130,402. 9.80% of the population were under 5 years of age. Dashmina had a literacy rate (age 7 and over) of 70.12%: 72.58% for males and 67.93% for females, and a sex ratio of 91.36 males for every 100 females. 23,906 (18.33%) lived in urban areas.

According to the 2011 Census of Bangladesh, Dashmina Upazila had 28,490 households and a population of 123,388. 31,102 (25.21%) were under 10 years of age. Dashmina has a literacy rate (age 7 and over) of 48.7%, compared to the national average of 51.8%, and a sex ratio of 1048 females per 1000 males. 19,252 (15.60%) lived in urban areas.

According to the 1991 Bangladesh census, Dashmina had a population of 106,539. Males constituted 49.5% of the population, and females 50.5%. The population aged 18 or older was 52,137. Dashmina had an average literacy rate of 29.5% (7+ years), compared to the national average of 32.4%.

== Administration ==
Dashmina Upazila is divided into seven union parishads:

- Rangopaldi
- Alipur
- Betagi Shankipur
- Dashmina Sadar
- Bahrampur
- Bashbaria
- Char Bohranuddin

The union parishads are subdivided into 51 mauzas and 55 villages.

== Education ==
At present it holds three colleges, three Boys' high schools, two girls' schools, an Alia Madrasa and a number of government and non government primary schools.

- Abdur Rashid Talukdar Degree

=== College ===
- Arojbegi Laboratory College
- Alipura College
- Doli Akbar Mohila College
- Dashmina Govt. Model High School
- Gachhani Secondary School
- Dakkhin Daspara A. Gani Girls

=== Dakhil Madrasah ===
- Begum Arefatunnessa Girls High

=== School ===
- Banglabazar Girls High School
- Hazirhat Nimmo maddhomik
- S A secondary school Arojbegi Dashmina,Patuakhali

=== Biddyalaoy ===
- Dashmina Senior Fazil Madrasha
- BM Labrotary School
- Bahrampur High School

== Notable people ==
- Abdul Mannan (Bir Pratik)

== See also ==
- Upazilas of Bangladesh
- Districts of Bangladesh
- Divisions of Bangladesh
