= Rajapur Upazila =

Rajapur রাজাপুর
- Upazila
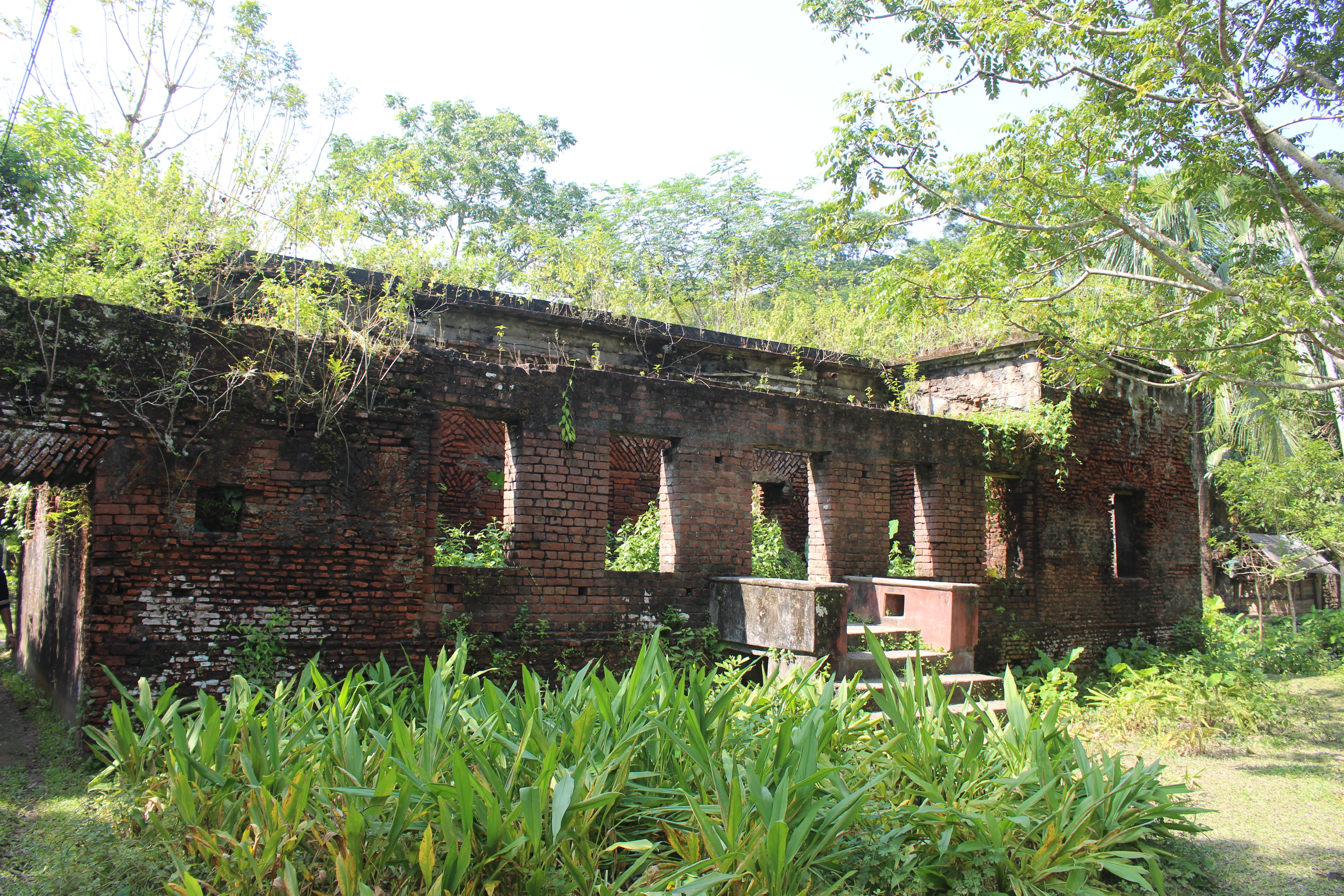
- The Saturia Mia Bari was the birthplace of Prime Minister of Bengal A. K. Fazlul Huq

- Coordinates: 22°34′N 90°8.5′E
- Country: Bangladesh
- Division: Barisal Division
- District: Jhalakati District
- Headquarters: Rajapur Union
- Thana: 1920
- Upazila: 1983

Government
  - Upazila Chairman: Muhammad Maniruzzaman
  - MP (Jhalokati-1): Bazlul Haque Haroon

Area
  - Total: 164.59 km^{2} (63.55 sq mi)

Population (2022)
  - Total: 144,681
  - Density: 879.04/km^{2} (2,276.7/sq mi)
- Time zone: UTC+6 (BST)
- Postal code: 8410
- Website: rajapur.jhalakathi.gov.bd

Rajapur Upazila mauza geocode map

Rajapur (Bengali: রাজাপুর) is an upazila (sub-district) of southern Bangladesh's Jhalokati District, which is a part of Barisal Division.

== Geography ==
Rajapur is located at 22.6667°N 90.1417°E. It has a total area of 164.59 km^{2}.

== History ==
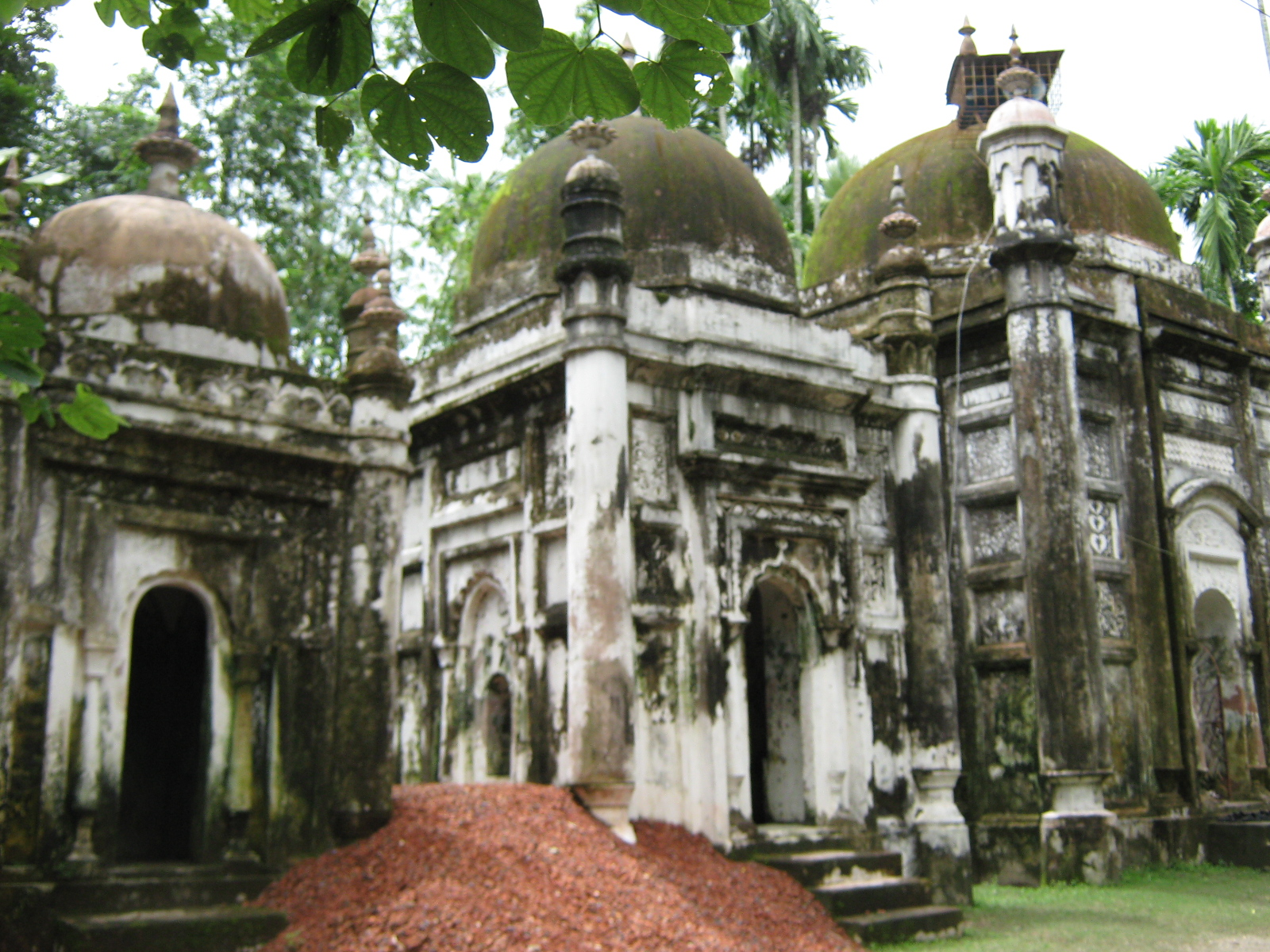
The historic Khan Bari triple mosque in Angaria village was situated in the home of Asmat Ali Khan.

Rajapur Upazila is home to many archeological sites such as forts and mosques. The Indrapasha Qila was thought to have been constructed during the reign of Mughal emperor Aurangzeb in the late seventeenth century. It was built to suppress the Maghs and Portuguese pirates around the Bay of Bengal. In 1664, Shaista Khan was appointed as the Mughal governor of Bengal to defeat the pirates. Khan constructed many forts with his accomplice, Muhammad Azam, including the Indrapasha Fort. The fort no longer stands, existing only as a soil mound. In the same period, Keshwar Singh, who is thought to have been a Mughal general, constructed the triple mosques of Angaria Khan Bari. A triple mosque was also constructed in the Niz Galua Mia Bari which also remains as one of the archeological tourist attractions of Rajapur.

During the Muslim rule, southern Chandradwip (including Rajapur) was governed by two sardars, one of whom was Reza Khan. The area was named Rezapur, which later became corrupted to Rajapur. In 1716, Mahmud Jan Akhand (Mamuji) established the Galua Paka Mosque in Durgapur village. Rajapur was also home to a zamindar family in Saturia descended from Khan Jahan Ali's disciple Shaykh Ahmad Sajenda. Sajenda's descendant Sheikh Shahabuddin (1626–1745) assisted the widow of Pran Narayan, the zamindar of Rayerkathi, in restoring their zamindari privileges by visiting the court of the Nawabs of Bengal in Murshidabad. Pran Narayan's heir Mahendra Narayan successively became the next zamindar of Rayerkathi, and as a reward, his mother gifted Sheikh Shahabuddin with a taluk in Saturia. Sheikh Shahabuddin founded the historic Shuktagarh Mosque, and is buried in a mazar (mausoleum) in close proximity to it. The Khanom Manzil in Barisal city was established by Mehrunnisa Khanom, who was the female zamindar of Sultanabad Pargana in present-day Rajapur along with Syed Abdullah Chowdhury. In 1919, Maulana Mahtabuddin Khan established the Imdadul Uloom Ashrafia Madrasa in Galua which had a big impact on educationally serving the people of Rajapur. A police outpost was founded in Rajapur by the British Raj in the following year, which was established as a thana (police station) in 1937.

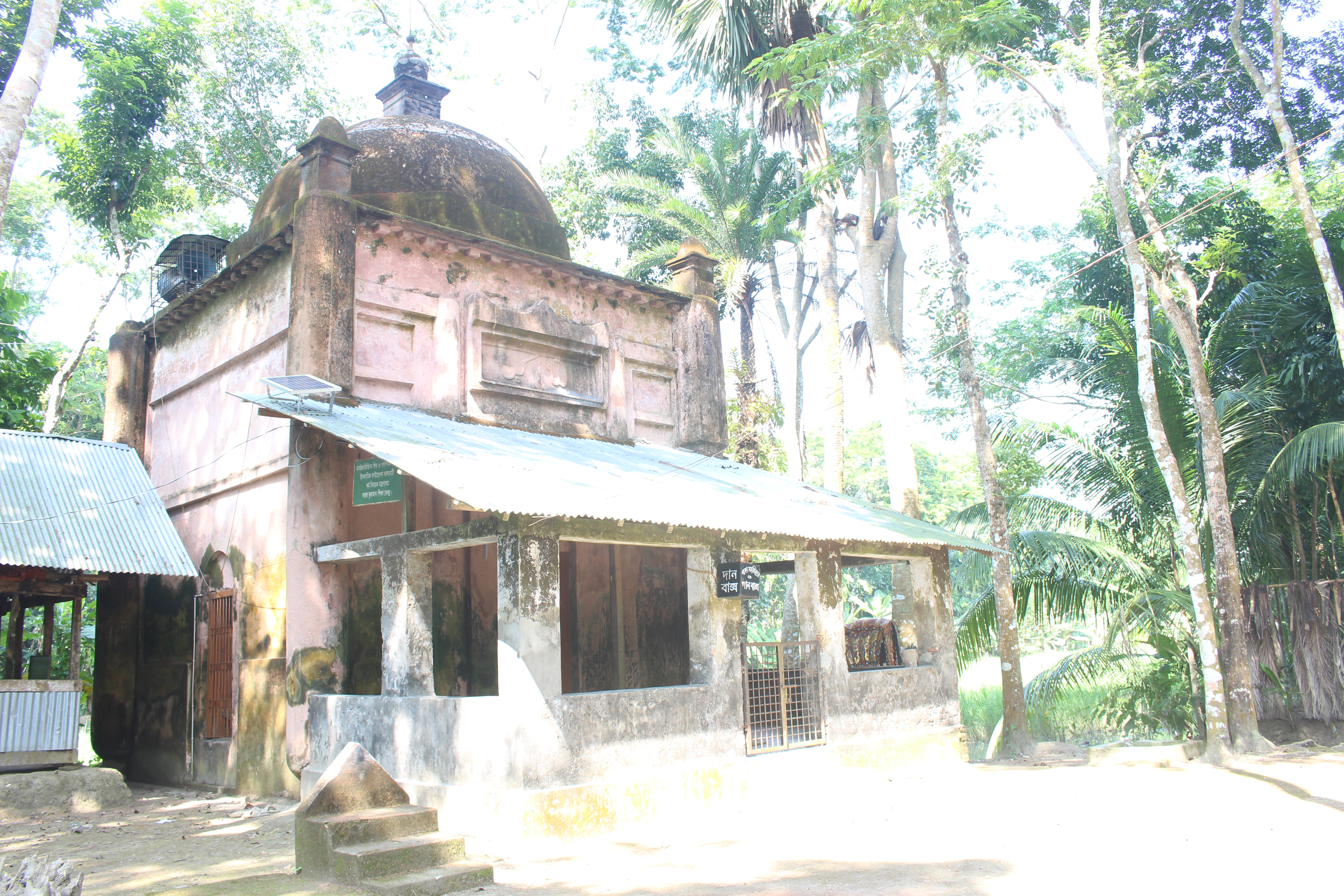
The Galua Paka Mosque is an archeological heritage site in Rajapur.

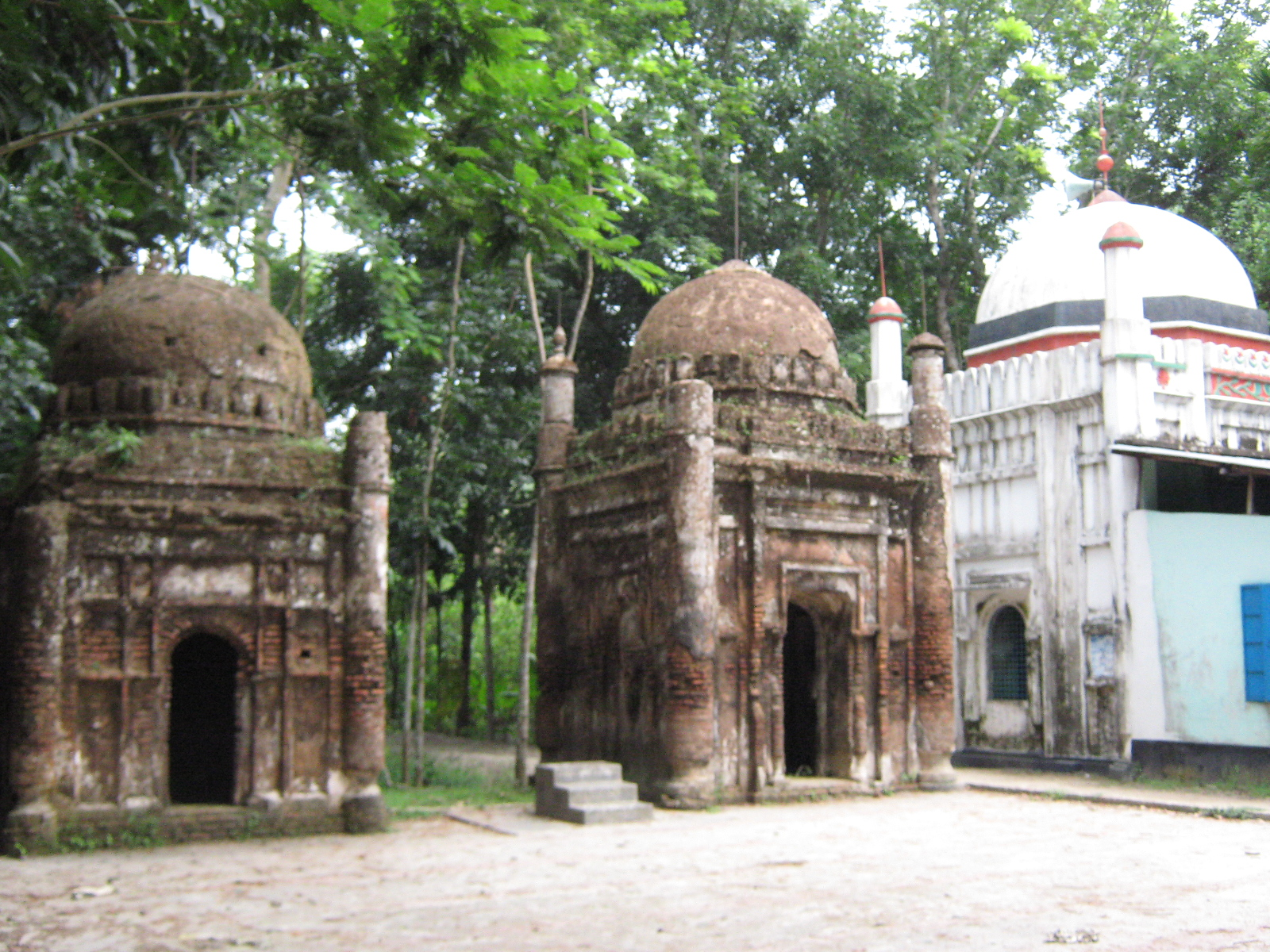
Ancient Triple Jame Mosque in Rajapur.

In 1940, the Rajapur Fazil Madrasa was established. During the Bangladesh War of Independence of 1971, a brawl took place between the Bengali fighters against the Pakistan Army on 21 October at the Rajapur thana (police station compound). In the aftermath, 8 Pakistan Army soldiers and 3 fighters were killed. The fighters raided the thana on 27 November, gaining control and thus capturing Rajapur. Dilwar Husayn of Gopalpur village was appointed as a sub-sector commander for Dinajpur under Sector 6 and later awarded Bir Protik. Alamtaj Begum Sabi was a notable female fighter of Rajapur. The status of Rajapur Thana was upgraded to upazila (sub-district) in 1983 as part of President of Bangladesh Hussain Muhammad Ershad's decentralisation programme.

List of liberation war martyrs from Rajapur
| Name | Village | Notes |
|---|---|---|
| Muhammad Yaqub Ali (1926–1971) | Saturia Mia Bari | Secretary for A. K. Fazlul Huq, killed in Dhaka on 15 December |
| MD ALAMGIR HAIDER | SHAHNAGAR ( SANGAR) | |
| Abul Kalam Babul | Galua | MCom student, tortured to death in Rajapur police station for possession of weaponry |
| Qazi Abul Husayn | Saturia | East Pakistan Rifles member, killed in Jessore |
| Muhammad Harun ar-Rashid | Manoharpur | Sipahi killed on 1 November in Banaripara |
| Ashrab Ali Hawladar | Adakhola | |
| Mufazzal Husayn | Sangar | |
| Abdur Rahman Ghazi | Great Kaibarttakhali | |
| Ismail Khan | Tarabunia | |
| Rahman Khan | Tarabunia | |
| Abdur Razzaq | Sangar | Murdered in Rajapur police station |
| Abdur Rashid Sardar | Chankati | |
| Nesaruddin Hawladar | Sangar | |
| Abdul Mannan Hawladar | Naikathi | |
| Firoz Kabir | Saikrail | Murdered under the Dargah Bari bridge on 13 November |
| Abul Husayn Taluqdar | Manoharpur | |

== Demographics ==
Religions in Rajapur Upazila (2022)
| Religion | Percent |
| Islam | 94.89% |
| Hinduism | 5.10% |
| Other or not stated | 0.01% |

According to the 2022 Bangladeshi census, Rajapur Upazila had 35,461 households and a population of 144,681. 9.94% of the population were under 5 years of age. Rajapur had a literacy rate (age 7 and over) of 83.55%: 84.37% for males and 82.83% for females, and a sex ratio of 89.32 males for every 100 females. 35,812 (24.75%) lived in urban areas.

According to the 2011 Census of Bangladesh, Rajapur Upazila had 33,903 households and a population of 148,494. 34,870 (23.48%) were under 10 years of age. Rajapur has a literacy rate (age 7 and over) of 63.9%, compared to the national average of 51.8%, and a sex ratio of 1090 females per 1000 males. 16,133 (10.86%) lived in urban areas.

According to the 1991 Bangladesh census, Rajapur had a population of 143,659. Males constituted 49.93% of the population, and females 50.07%. The population aged 18 or over was 72,392. Rajapur had an average literacy rate of 52.7% (7+ years), compared to the national average of 32.4%.

== Administration ==
Rajapur Upazila is divided into six union parishads: Baraia, Galua, Mathbari, Rajapur, Saturia, and Suktagarh. The union parishads are subdivided into 72 mauzas and 75 villages.

== Tourist attraction ==
- Saturia Zamindar Bari

== Notable people ==
- A. K. Fazlul Huq, first and longest-serving prime minister of Bengal
- Abdul Auwal Khan, educationist
- Sultan Hossain Khan, former chairperson of the Anti-Corruption Commission and Bangladesh Press Council
- Shahjahan Omar, retired army major and former minister
- Harun ar-Rashid, agricultural researcher

== See also ==
- Upazilas of Bangladesh
- Districts of Bangladesh
- Divisions of Bangladesh
