= Gournadi Upazila =

Gournadi গৌরনদী
- Upazila
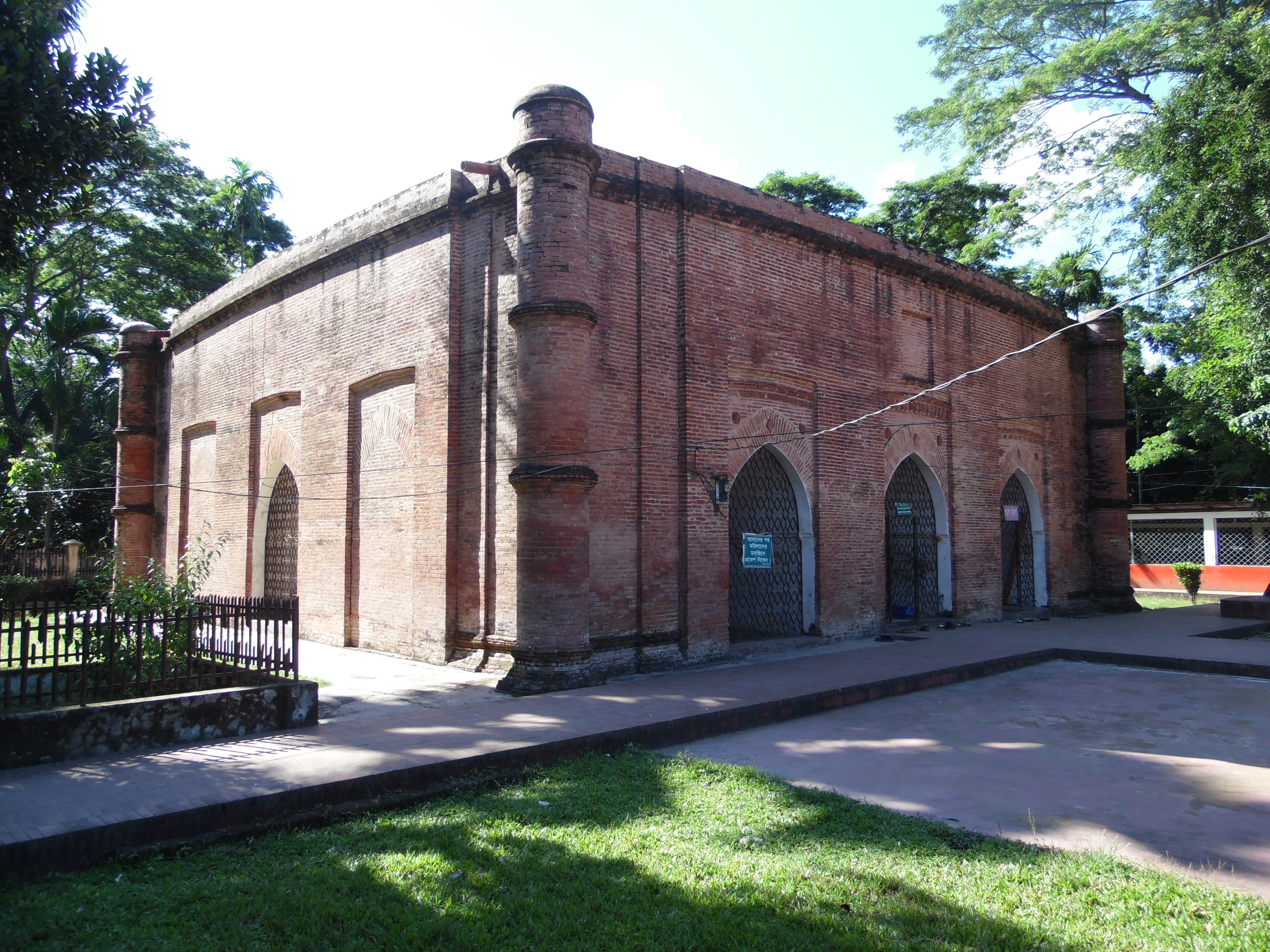
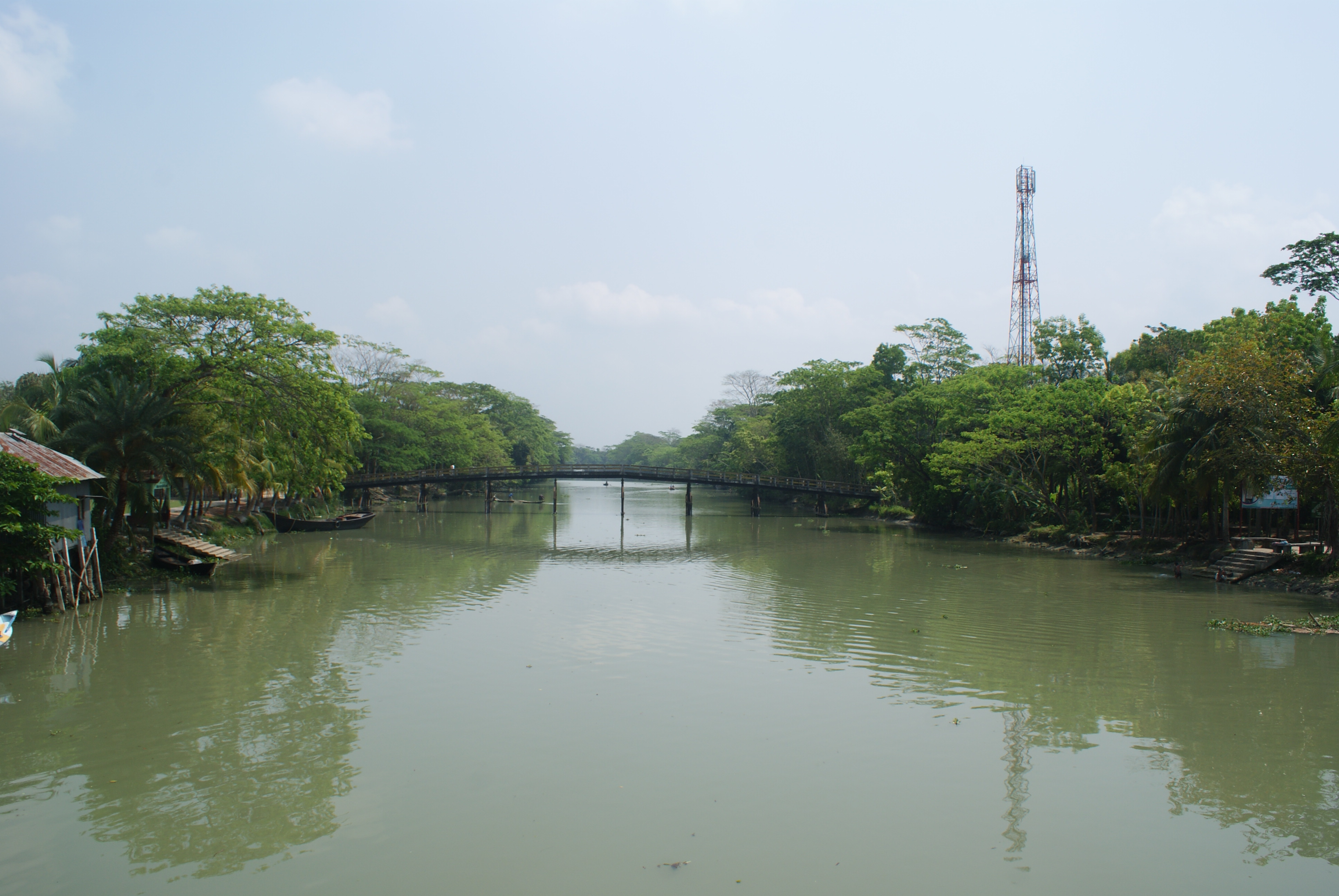
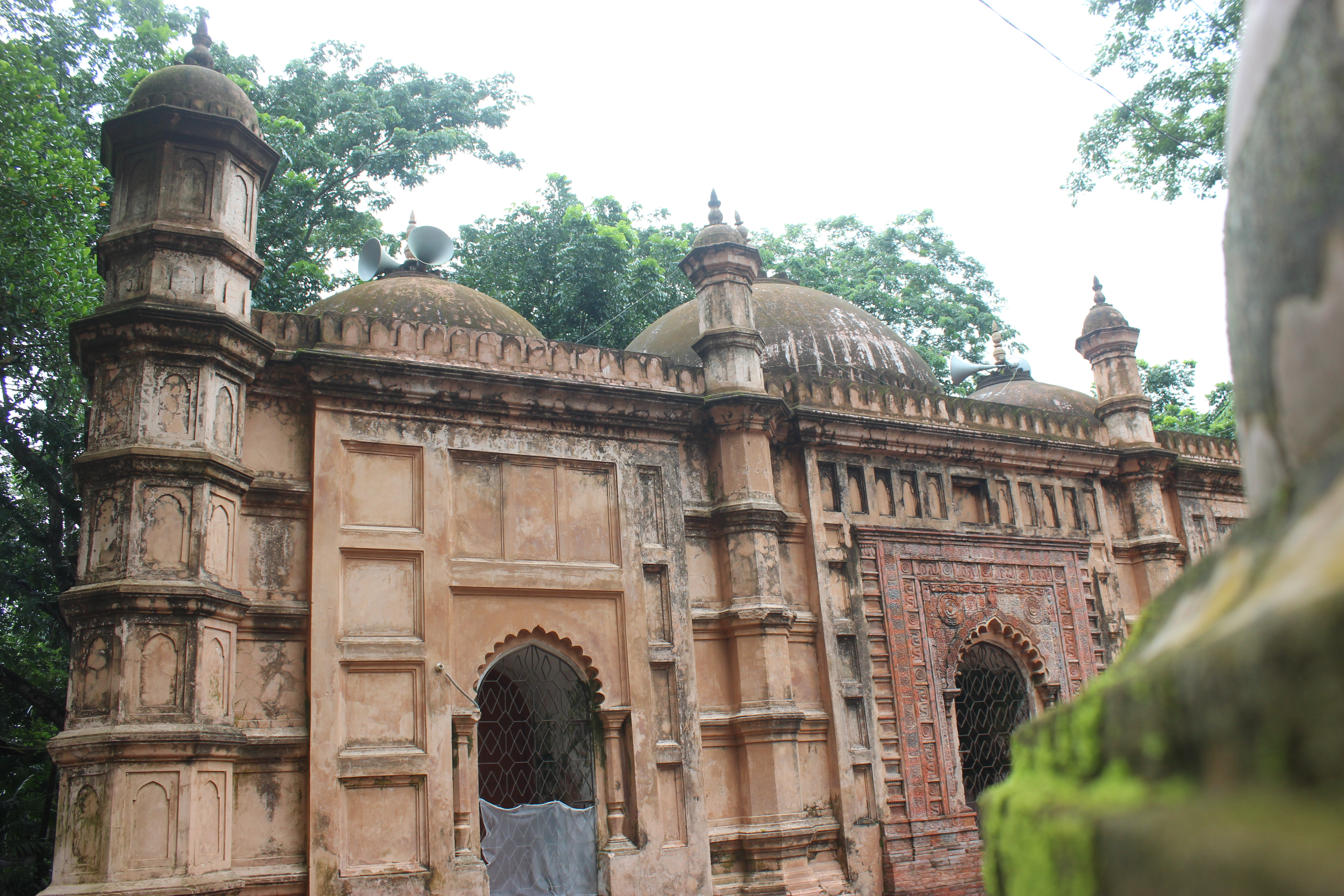
- From top: Qasba Mosque, Mahishkatakhali River and Masum Khan Mosque

- Coordinates: 22°58.4′N 90°13.8′E
- Country: Bangladesh
- Division: Barisal Division
- District: Barisal District

Area
  - Total: 144.18 km^{2} (55.67 sq mi)

Population (2022)
  - Total: 205,878
  - Density: 1,427.9/km^{2} (3,698.3/sq mi)
- Time zone: UTC+6 (BST)
- Postal code: 8230
- Area code: 04322
- Website: gournadi.barisal.gov.bd

Gournadi (Bengali: গৌরনদী) is an administrative unit of Barishal District in the division of Barishal, Bangladesh.

== Geography ==
Gournadi is located at 22.9736°N 90.2306°E. It has a total area of 144.18 km^{2}.

== History ==
The village of Qasba was an important centre in the Sultanate of Bengal and was home to several influential Muslim families. The Qasba Mosque was constructed in the early 16th century, during the reign of Alauddin Husain Shah. In the course of the reign of Mughal emperor Jahangir (r. 1606–1627), seven sons of a Yemeni grandee travelled to Bengal to propagate Islam. The second son entered Qasba, and legend has it that Jahangir himself went to Qasba to meet with him. His missionary activities were spread across the Barisal and Faridpur regions and many people converted to Islam through his efforts. He also dug reservoirs known as dighis for the welfare of locals and among the notable ponds are Padmabunia, Goalia and Mali Majhor Andhi. Locals began to refer to him as Dudh Mallik because the milkman would often come from Goalia to give him milk. It is said that Dudh Mallik survived only on cow's milk for a long time. His gardener would make a necklace out of padma lotuses obtained from Padmabunia Dighi and gift it to Dudh Mallik. After Dudh Mallik's death, Emperor Jahangir awarded 16 droṇs and 14 kanis of tax-free (lakheraj) land for Hazrat Doodh Kumar's mazar (mausoleum), which also led to Qasba being popularly known as Lakheraj-Qasba. The copper-plate certification of this is preserved by the Qazi family of Qasba. The Shah family of Qasba serve as guardians of the tomb and claim to have arrived in the region with Dudh Mallik in the 17th century.

Following the conquest of Bakla in the early 17th-century, Emperor Jahangir awarded parts of Chandradwip to Ulfat Ghazi for his participation, and these areas became the Nazirpur pargana of Bakla. His son, Syed Qutb Shah, first settled in the village of Terachar but relocated to Nalchira due to safer conditions and was awarded with tax-free land from Sabi Khan, the Faujdar of Bakla. Qutb Shah was renowned for his Muslim missionary activities across Barisal, Madaripur and Bagerhat. He dug reservoirs and ponds and built mosques for the welfare of locals. A copy of the Quran handwritten by him and a qadam-e-rasul is preserved in a box at the Nalchira Miah Bari. His descendants, the Miah family of Nalchira and the Zamindars of Nazirpur, continued to hold influential positions in the history of Barisal for several centuries. An urs is annually held in Nalchira in honour of Syed Qutb Shah.

== Demographics ==
Religions in Gournadi Upazila (2022)
Religion	Percent
Islam	86.02%
Hinduism	13.19%
Christianity	0.78%
Other or not stated	0.01%

According to the 2022 Bangladeshi census, Gaurnadi Upazila had 50,058 households and a population of 205,878. 8.70% of the population were under 5 years of age. Gaurnadi had a literacy rate (age 7 and over) of 78.25%: 80.12% for males and 76.54% for females, and a sex ratio of 93.04 males for every 100 females. 50,653 (24.60%) lived in urban areas.

As of the 2011 Census of Bangladesh, Gournadi upazila has a population of 188,586 living in 41,561 households. Gournadi has an average literacy rate of 60.90% (7+ years) and a sex ratio of 1045 females per 1000 males. 42,438 (22.50%) of the population lives in urban areas. Most of the population present in Muslim, with minorities such as Hindus and Christians. In the town there is also a Hindu temple, notably the Nalchira Nimna Nabadwip Sri Sri Hari O Durga Temple.

According to the 2001 Bangladesh census, Gournadi had a population of 180,219. Males constituted 51.03% of the population, while females make around 48.97%. Gournadi had an average literacy rate of 59.4% (7+ years).

== Administration ==
UNO: Md. Abu Abdullah Khan.

Gournadi Upazila is divided into Gournadi municipality and seven union parishads. These are:

- Barthi
- Batajore
- Chandshi
- Khanjapur
- Mahilara
- Nalchira
- Sarikal

The union parishads are subdivided into 108 mauzas and 109 villages.

== Notable people ==
- Wazil Khan, 15th-century governor
- Syed Qutb Shah, 17th-century Sufi saint
- Brajamohan Dutta (1826–1886), philanthropist and educationist
- Ashwini Kumar Dutta (1856–1923), philanthropist and author
- Kadambini Ganguly née Bose (1861–1923), first South Asian female doctor of western medicine
- Jogendra Nath Mandal (1904–1968), first Law Minister of Pakistan
- Narayan Gangopadhyay (1918–1970), novelist
- Kazi Golam Mahbub (1927–2006), activist
- Talukder Mohammad Yunus (born 1952), politician
- Zahir Uddin Swapon (born 1960), Minister of Information and Broadcasting
- Lokman Hossain Miah (born 1963), executive chairman of Bangladesh Investment Development Authority
- Omar Sani (born 1968), television and film actor
- Mosharraf Karim (born 1971), television and film actor

== See also ==
- Gournadi
- West Showra Alim Madrasha
