= Char Monai =

Char Monai চরমোনাই
- Union Council
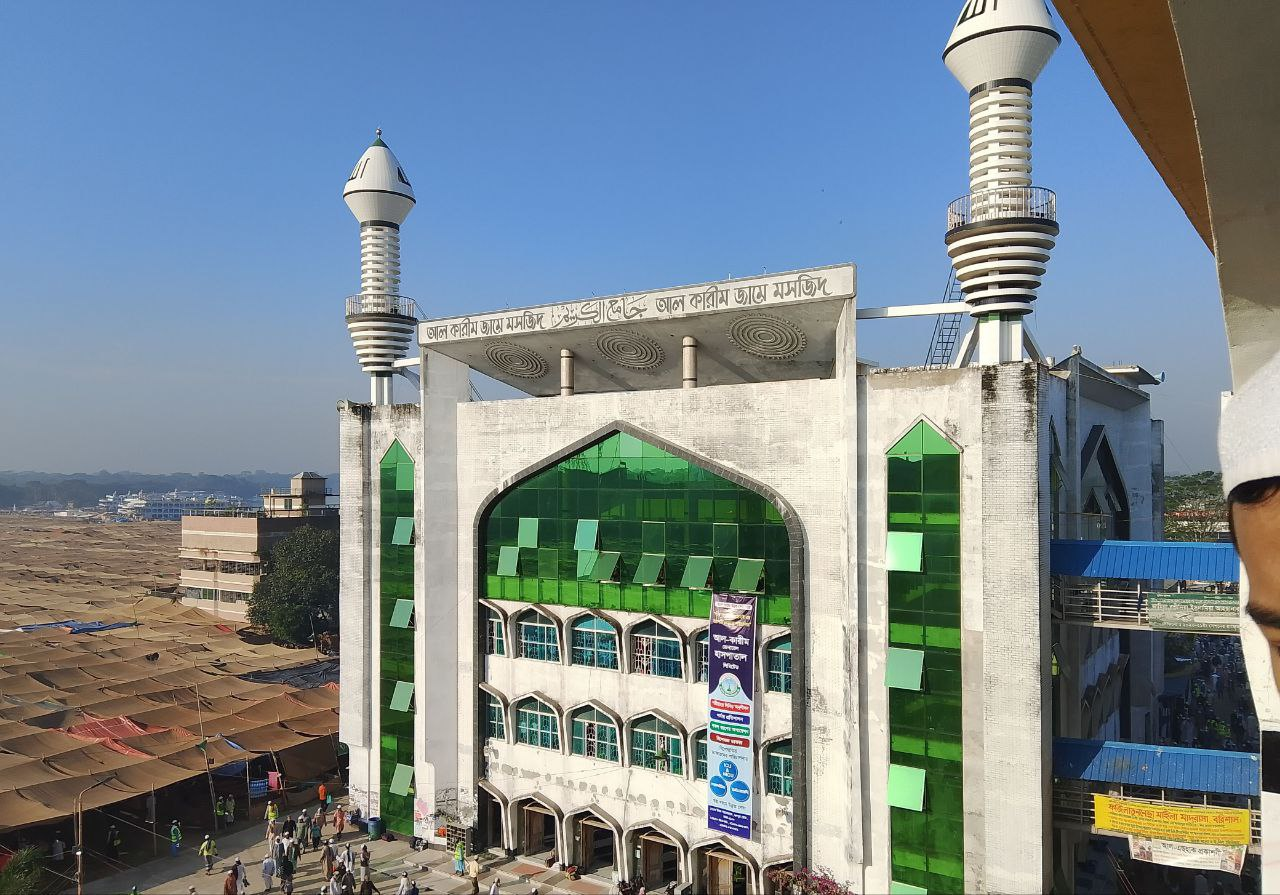
- Al-Karim Jame Mosque in Charmonai

- Location in Bangladesh
- Coordinates: 22°43′N 90°27′E
- Country: Bangladesh
- Division: Barisal Division
- District: Barisal District
- Upazila: Barisal Sadar Upazila
- Union: Char Monai Union

Area
  - Total: 4.17 km^{2} (1.61 sq mi)

Population (2022)
  - Total: 9,339
  - Density: 2,240/km^{2} (5,800/sq mi)
- Demonym: Charmonaiya
- Time zone: UTC+6 (BST)
- Postal code: 8200
- Area code: 8200
- Website: charmonaiup.barisal.gov.bd

Char Monai is the main village in the Char Monai Union of Barisal Sadar Upazila in Barisal District, part of the Barisal Division of southern-central Bangladesh. The village is home to the Charmonai Ahsanabad Rashidia Kamil Madrasa and Charmonai Jamia Rashidia Islamia institutions.

According to the 2022 Census of Bangladesh, Char Monai had 1,290 households and a population of 9,339. It has a total area of 4.17 km^{2} (1.61 sq mi).

== History ==
Char Monai is traditionally understood to occupy land that once formed part of the Kirtankhola River as it flowed past Barisal, within a dynamic riverine landscape characterised by sedimentation and channel shifts. Over time, a small alluvial shoal (locally known as a char) emerged in the midstream of the river through natural depositional processes. According to tradition, a Muslim dervish known as Monai Pagal settled on this newly formed land, where he constructed a modest thatched dwelling and devoted himself to establishing prayers and fasting. The locality subsequently derived its name, Char Monai (“Monai’s shoal”), in reference to this individual. Through the efforts of Syed Muhammad Ishaq, a graduate of Darul Uloom Deoband, the Charmonai Darbar Sharif became a major center of Islamic education, childcare and spirituality in South Bengal, and later much of Bangladesh.

On 20 March 1964, the Char Monai Union was officially established, comprising 15 villages with its headquarters in Char Monai village. During the Bangladesh Liberation War of 1971, Mohammad Abdul Jalil (commander of Sector 9), Captain Abdul Latif and other Bengali freedom fighters would regularly seek advice and supplications from Pir Syed Muhammad Ishaq at the Charmonai Darbar Sharif. The Charmonai madrasas became a lodge for Bengali freedom fighters where they would stay and return from various battles. The freedom fighters were provided two large rooms to use and they were accommodated for. For the entirety of the nine-month war, several government officials based in Barisal would shelter themselves with their families at the Charmonai madrasas.
