= Satla =

Satla সাতলা
- Village
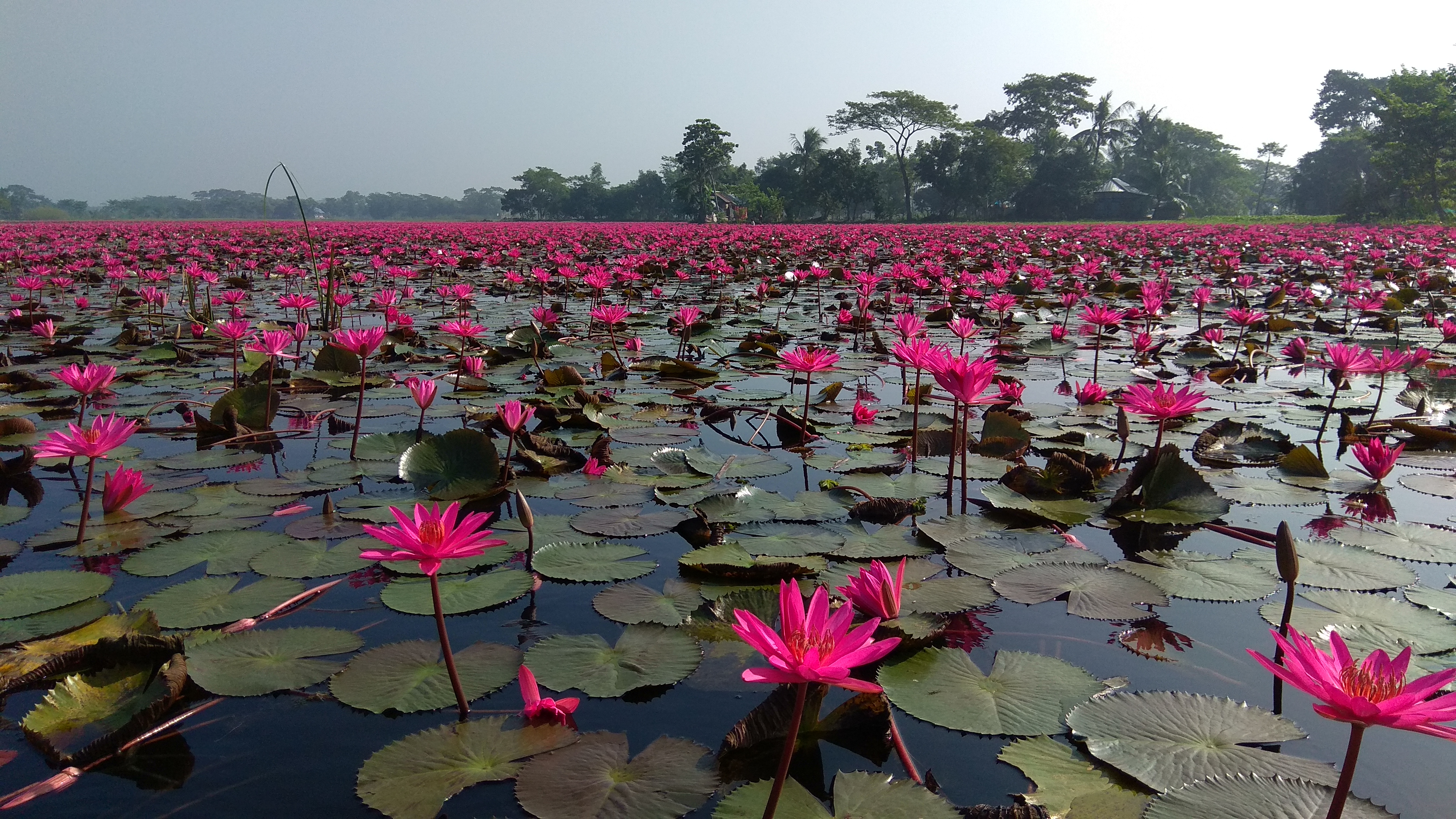
- Satla Beel

- Location in Bangladesh
- Coordinates: 22°55′N 90°05′E
- Country: Bangladesh
- Division: Barisal Division
- District: Barisal District
- Upazila: Wazirpur Upazila

Area
  - Total: 8.50 km^{2} (3.28 sq mi)

Population (2022)
  - Total: 4,503
  - Density: 530/km^{2} (1,370/sq mi)
- Time zone: UTC+6 (Bangladesh Time)

Satla is a village and growth centre in Wazirpur Upazila of Barisal District in the Barisal Division of southern-central Bangladesh.

== Demography ==
According to the 2022 Census of Bangladesh, Satla had 1,136 households and a population of 4,503. It has a total area of 8.50 km^{2} (3.28 sq mi).

== Tourist attraction ==
This village has a 200-acre lake known as Shatla Beel. This lake blooms with Shapla flowers from July to October, which attracts many tourists.

== Notable people ==
- Harnath Bain, politician and freedom fighter

== Gallery ==
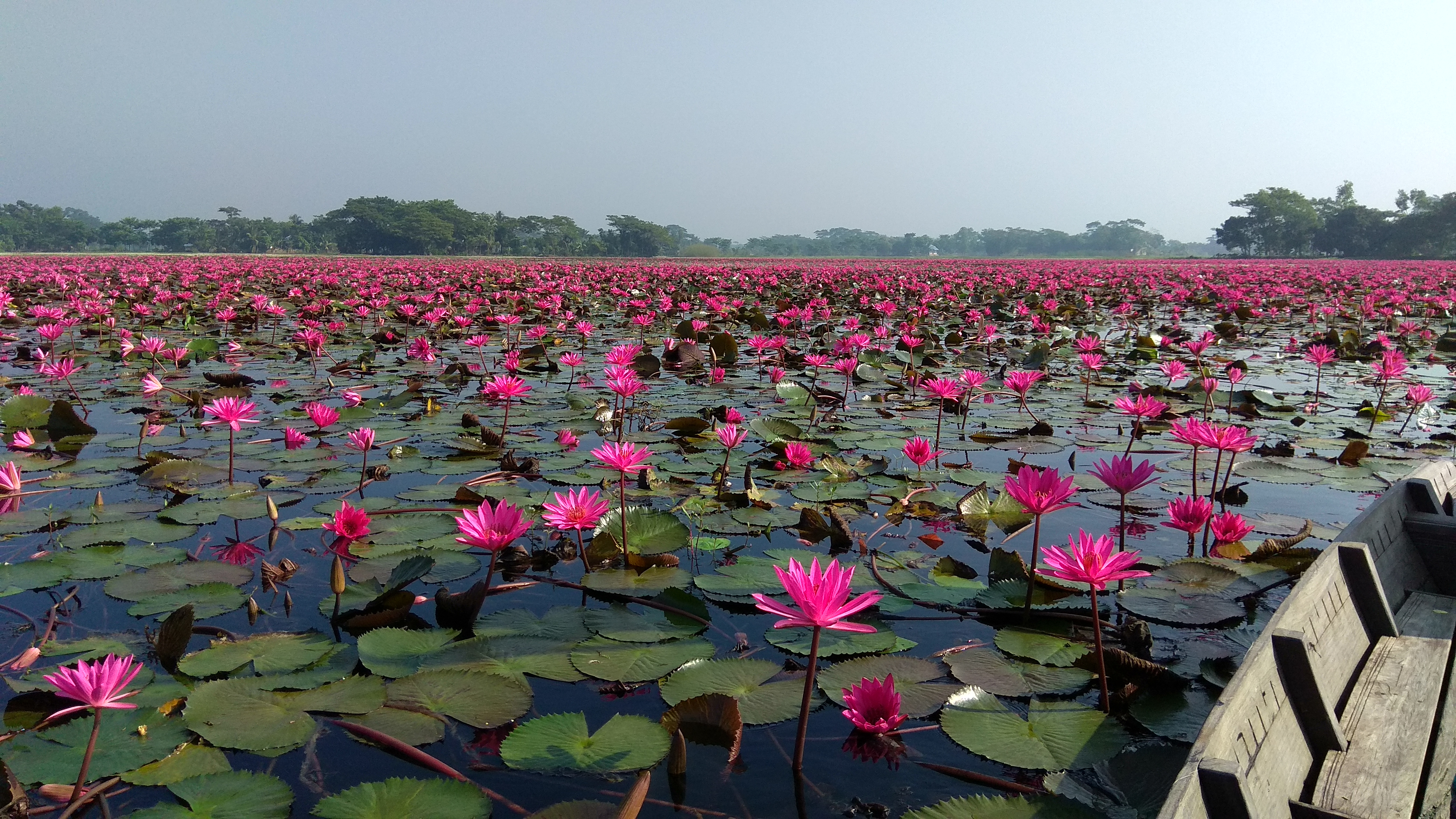

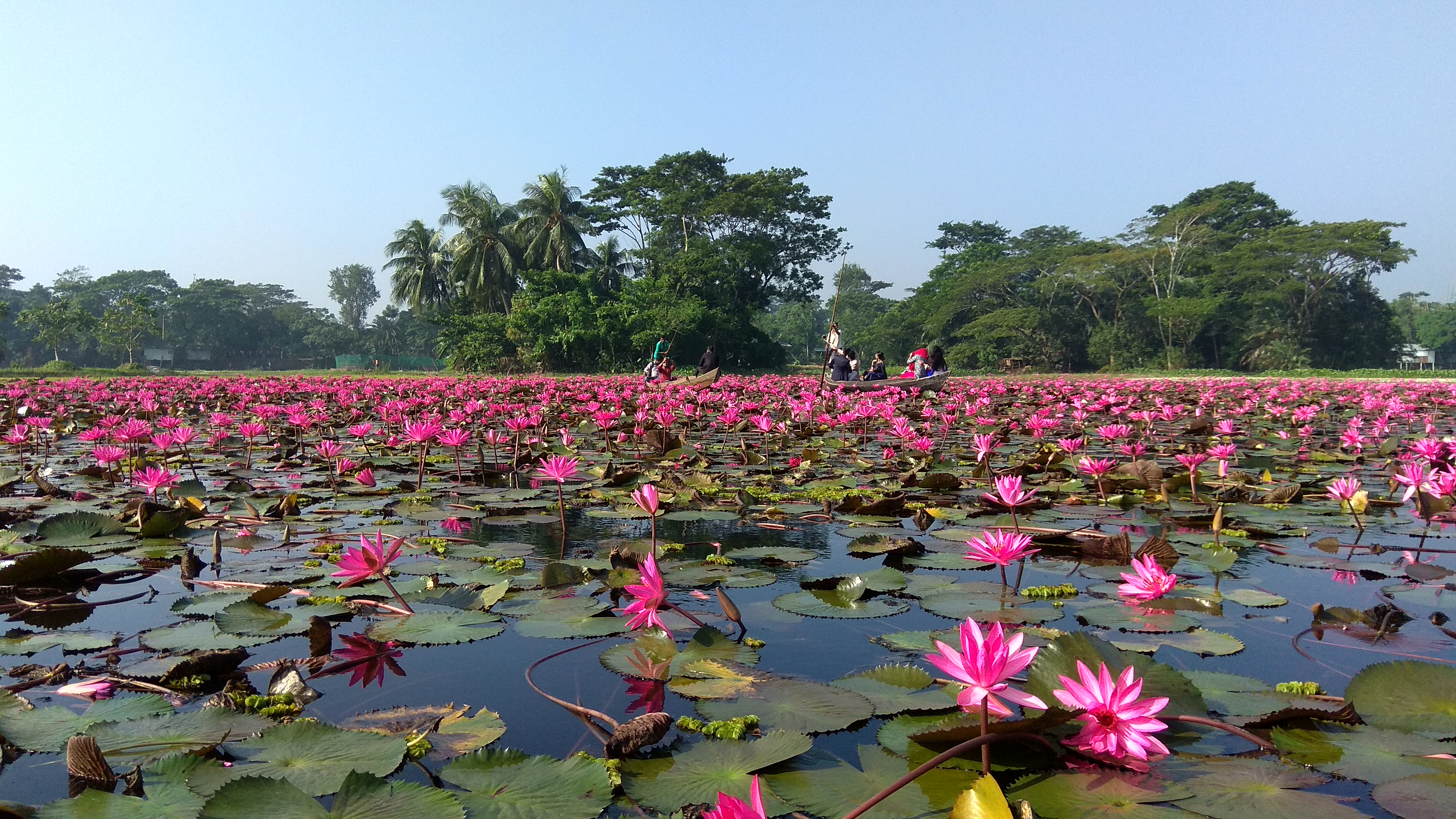

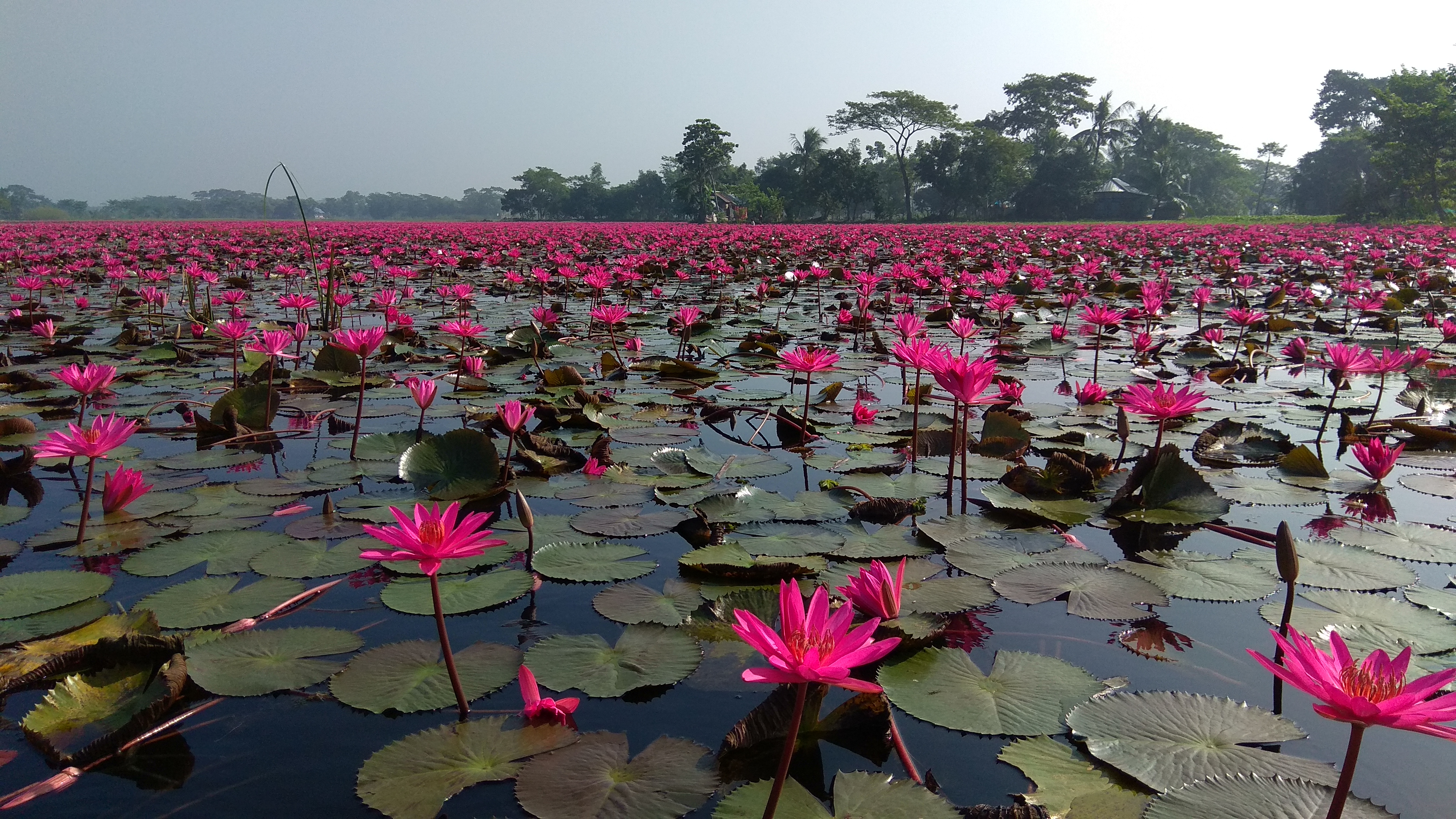

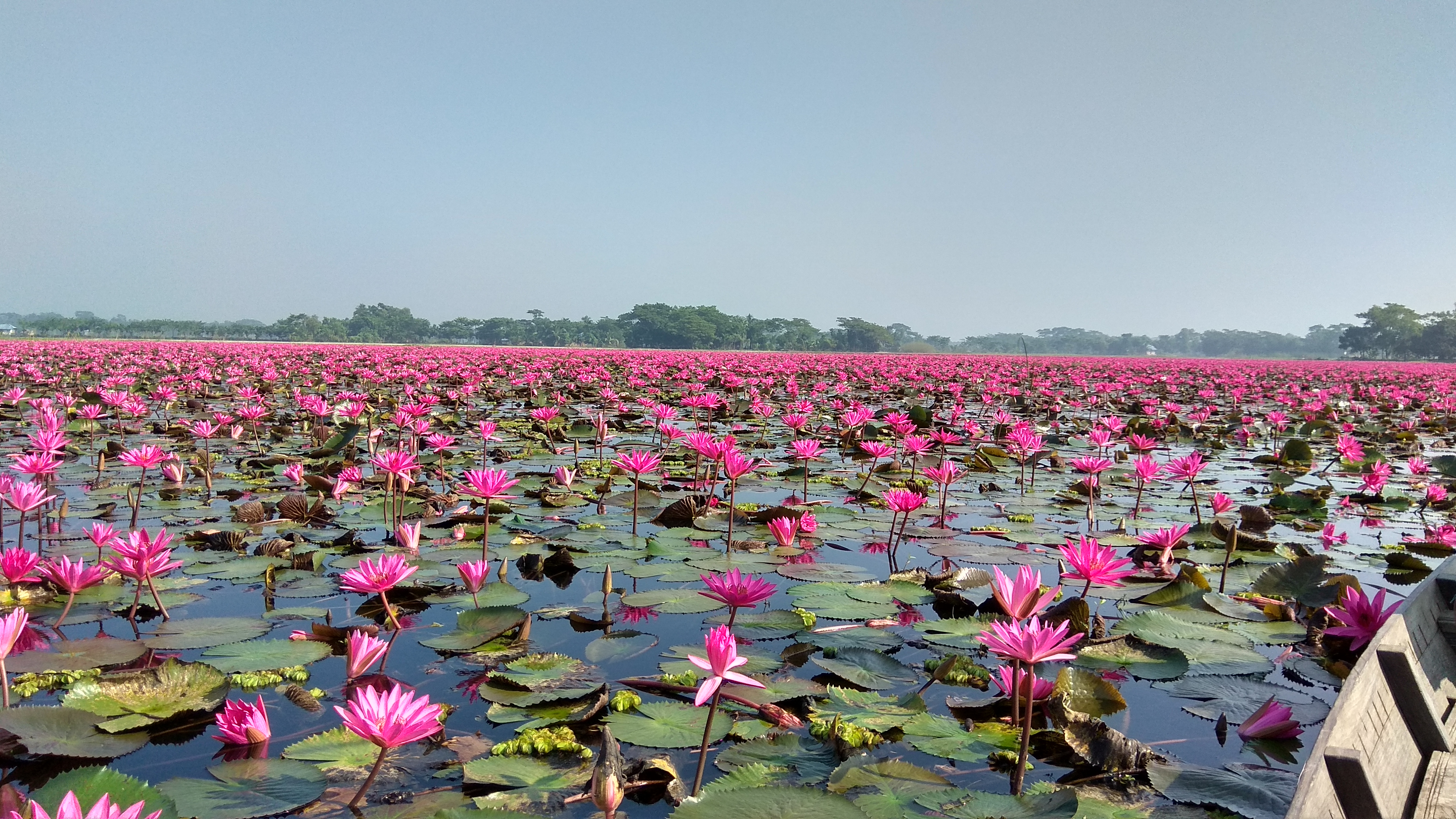
