= Harta, Bangladesh =

Harta হারতা
- Town
- Location in Bangladesh
- Coordinates: 22°51′N 90°07′E
- Country: Bangladesh
- Division: Barisal Division
- District: Barisal District
- Upazila: Wazirpur Upazila

Area
  - Total: 7.64 km^{2} (2.95 sq mi)

Population (2022)
  - Total: 8,474
  - Density: 1,110/km^{2} (2,870/sq mi)
- Time zone: UTC+6 (Bangladesh Time)

Harta is a small town and growth centre in Wazirpur Upazila of Barisal District in the Barisal Division of southern-central Bangladesh.

== Demography ==
According to the 2022 Census of Bangladesh, Harta had 2,047 households and a population of 8,474. It has a total area of 7.64 km^{2} (2.95 sq mi).

== Economy ==
Harta is served by a large market and a bank, Bangladesh Krishi Bank.
