= Keshabkathi =

Kesabkati কেশবকাঠি
- Village
- Location in Bangladesh
- Coordinates: 22°52′N 90°09′E
- Country: Bangladesh
- Division: Barisal Division
- District: Barisal District
- Upazila: Wazirpur Upazila

Area
  - Total: 5.51 km^{2} (2.13 sq mi)

Population (2022)
  - Total: 6,014
  - Density: 1,090/km^{2} (2,830/sq mi)
- Time zone: UTC+6 (Bangladesh Time)

Kesabkati or Keshabkathi is a village in Wazirpur Upazila of Barisal District in the Barisal Division of southern-central Bangladesh.

According to the 2022 Census of Bangladesh, Kesabkati had 1,522 households and a population of 6,014. It has a total area of 5.51 km^{2} (2.13 sq mi).
