= Mohacha village =

Mohacha
- village
- India Mohacha (India)
- Coordinates: 26.65772°N 76.91974°E
- Country: India
- State: Rajasthan
- District: Sawai Madhopur

Population (2011)
  - Total: 2,767

Languages
  - Official: Hindi
  - Literacy: 57.21%

Demographics
- Time zone: UTC+5:30 (IST)
- PIN: 322205
- Vehicle registration: RJ 25

Mohacha is a village in Gangapur City, Sawai Madhopur district in the state of Rajasthan, India.

Mohacha is located along the main railway line from Delhi to Mumbai, accessed via Kota on the rail path from New Delhi. The village's standing population is 2767 as of 2011, with the majority of the region's population settled throughout the Meena community.

== Climate ==
The seasonal temperature is consistent with that of its neighboring districts, with the summer season ranging from 25 °C (77 °F) to 45 °C (113 °F), and in the winter from 5 °C (41 °F) to 23 °C (73 °F).

== Transportation ==
Mohacha is served by the local Khandip Railway Station, and by buses that travel between Raipur and Shri Mahabirji. It can also be reached by jugaad from Gangapur City, Hindaun and Wazirpur.

Trains having stoppage at Khandip station 59811/59812/59813/59814/54793/54794 /59805/59806/69155/69156

Also buses are available to Gangapur city, Jaipur.
