= Islami Sromik Andolan Bangladesh =

Islami Sramik Andolan Bangladesh ইসলামী শ্রমিক আন্দোলন বাংলাদেশ
- Abbreviation: ISAB
- President: Muhammad Khalilur Rahman
- Vice President: Muhammad Mostofa Kamal
- Secretary General: KM Billal
- Founded: ---
- Headquarters: 55/B (3rd Floor), Purana Paltan, Dhaka
- Ideology: Islamism; Conservatism
- Political position: Right-wing
- National affiliation: Islami Andolan Bangladesh

Website
- isa-bd.com

Islami Sromik Andolan Bangladesh (Bengali: ইসলামী শ্রমিক আন্দোলন বাংলাদেশ, lit. 'Islamic Labour Movement Bangladesh') (ISAB) is the trade union of Islami Andolan Bangladesh (IAB).

== History ==
With the special guidance and patronage of the late Pir of Charmonai, Hazrat Maulana Syed Muhammad Fazlul Karim (Rh.), the Islami Sramik Andolan Bangladesh was formed to establish the true dignity and just rights of workers. The late Pir Saheb Huzur (Rh.) had declared in a powerful voice that the just rights and dignity of labour cannot be established without the implementation of Islamic labour policy. The ultimate dignity, just rights, final success, true peace, and overall welfare of all human beings, including the working class, are inherent in the great ideology of Islam bestowed by Allah.

== Leadership ==
The central president of the organization is Muhammad Khalilur Rahman, Central Vice President is Muhammad Mostofa Kamal, Secretary-general is KM Billal.

== Activities ==
Islami Sromik Andolan Bangladesh celebrated its founding anniversary rally at the Baitul Mukarram North Gate on November 8, 2024.

On April 4, 2025, Islami Sramik Andolan Bangladesh, in a joint statement, fully supported the payment of tea workers' unpaid wages and their 11-point demands. The statement also called on the relevant authorities and owners to take effective measures for their swift implementation.
