= Murder of Omar Faruk Tripura =

Killing in Bandarban, Bangladesh

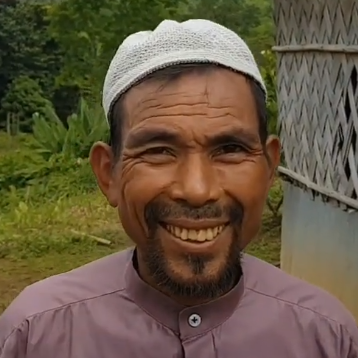
- Omar Faruk Tripura
- Native name: ওমর ফারুক ত্রিপুরা হত্যাকাণ্ড
- Location: 22°12′50″N 92°23′22″E; Tulachhari Tripura Para, Rowangchhari Upazila, Bandarban District, Bangladesh
- Date: 18 June 2021; 9:10 pm
- Attack type: Murder
- Weapon: Firearm
- Deaths: 1 (Tripura)
- Injuries: 1 (Begum)
- Victim: Omar Faruk Tripura
- Perpetrators: Parbatya Chattagram Jana Samhati Samiti (Alleged; denied)
- No. of participants: 4–5
- Motive: Islamophobia

On June 18, 2021, Omar Faruk Tripura, a 54-year-old ethnic Tripuri Muslim convert and local imam, was shot dead, by a group of assailants near a local mosque, in the remote Rowangchhari Upazilla of Bandarban District, Bangladesh. He was killed allegedly for his conversion to Islam. The killing triggered widespread outrage in the country.

== Background ==
=== Omar Faruk Tripura ===
Omar Faruk born as Purnendu Tripura belonged to the Tripura community. His father had converted from Buddhism to Christianity. In 2014, while in Thanchi, Purnendu was inspired by an indigenous Muslim friend and decided to accept Islam. He came to Bandarban, embraced the religion, and took the name Omar Faruk. After his conversion, he went to Dhaka, joined Tablighi Jamaat, and completed 40 days of pilgrimage. He later returned to Rowangchhari.

=== Missionary activities ===
He established a mosque on the land inherited from his father-in-law in Rowangchhari. He was imam at the bazaar mosque of Rowangchhari as well as his own mosque too. Through his efforts, 30 families converted to Islam.

=== Persecution ===
Faruk received threats from Parbatya Chattagram Jana Samhati Samiti known as JSS after his conversion to Islam. Shortly after his return to his native village from Dhaka, Omar Faruk received lethal threat from the JSS members, pressuring him to leave Islam. But he boldly refused citing religious freedom as a democratic right. The mosque publicly practiced Adhan since 2018 which further drew threats.

== Murder ==
On 18 June 2021, Omar Faruk was killed by 4/5 unidentified assailants at his doorstep after returning to his home after Isha prayer. His wife Rabeya Begum tried to protect her husband, but the attackers kicked her in the chest, causing her to fall down. According to Faruk's daughter Amena, he used to have dinner after Isha prayer with his family at home. On Friday night, June 18, like any other day, his father was resting on a chair after returning home after Isha prayers. The rest of the family was getting dinner ready. At that time, a voice called him from outside the house and called him by his former Tripura name. Omar Faruk tried to look out of the window without answering and stayed inside the house. At that time, the armed gunmen broke open the door and pointed weapons at him and the wife Rabeya Begum rushed to save her husband. But when the assailants kicked her in the chest, causing her to fall down. At that time, two rounds were fired at Omar Faruk in the head from blank range, but he fell on his face and immediately died.

== Aftermath ==
The victim's family blamed militants linked to JSS (Santu) alleging "Omar Faruk was killed because he accepted Islam and built a mosque in Tripura." JSS denied all involvement. The police launched an investigation but were yet to arrest any suspect over the killing of Omar Faruk Tripura also relocated his family, including his widow, from the remote village for their safety. Rawangchari Upazila Nirbahi Officer provided the family with shelter in the upazila headquarters considering its vulnerability while four more families, who were converted to Islam a couple of years ago, were relocated and sent to local Tripura community.

== Reaction ==
The killing triggered strong reactions in Bangladesh, particularly among Muslim communities and Bengali groups in the Chittagong Hill Tracts. Protest was staged in Bandarban demanding justice for the murder of Omar Faruk Tripura.

Hefazat-e-Islam Bangladesh president Junaid Babunagari condemned the killing in a statement saying that the killing of Omar was premeditated so that no ethnic minority people would dire to embrace Islam. Nizam-e-Islam Party strongly condemned and protested the murder nd demanded exemplary justice., citing security issues of Muslims in Chittagong Hill Tract. Bangladesh Jamaat-e-Islami amir Shafiqur Rahman released a statement demanding justice. Islami Jubo Andolan Bangladesh released a joint statement criticizing the condition of Muslims in Chittagong Hill Tract and alleging conspiracy to separate the Chittagong Hill Tracts from Bangladesh.

Islamic scholar Mizanur Rahman Azhari expressed concern and urged for a fair investigation and trial. Professor of University of Dhaka and former adviser to the interim government of Bangladesh, Asif Nazrul demanded justice, further criticized the silence of human rights organizations and intellectuals, labeling it a double standard. Minister of Chittagong Hill Tracts affairs, Ushwe Sing, assured legal actions against the assailants.

Mehedi Hasan Palash, the chairman of CHT Research Foundation — a non-profit organisation, believed that the assailants killed Omar only because of his religious conversion. Kazi Mojibur Rahman, district unit president of Parbattya Chattogram Nagarik Parishad, said that they would continue demonstration demanding justice for his killing.

Rawangchari Upazila chairman Chawhai Marma said that every citizen has their rights to practice their own religion and the killing for practicing any religion was not acceptable in an independent country. John Tripura, an ethnic minority rights activist in Bandarban, alleged the killing as a part of greater conspiracy.

== Memorial ==
On 18 June 2022, the Shahid Omar Faruk Tripura Smriti Sangshad organized a program to commemorate the event. The event was held at Mosafir Park under the supervision of the Parbatya Chattagram Chhatra Parishad. On the same day in 2026, his sixth martyrdom anniversary was observed in Rawangchari.

== See also ==
- Freedom of religion in Bangladesh
