= Otra, Bangladesh =

Otra ওটরা
- Village
- Location in Bangladesh
- Coordinates: 22°52′N 90°10′E
- Country: Bangladesh
- Division: Barisal Division
- District: Barisal District
- Upazila: Wazirpur Upazila

Area
  - Total: 5.37 km^{2} (2.07 sq mi)

Population (2022)
  - Total: 5,053
  - Density: 941/km^{2} (2,440/sq mi)
- Time zone: UTC+6 (Bangladesh Time)

Otra is a village in Wazirpur Upazila of Barisal District in the Barisal Division of southern-central Bangladesh.

According to the 2022 Census of Bangladesh, Otra had 1,352 households and a population of 5,053. It has a total area of 5.37 km^{2} (2.07 sq mi).
