= Islami Jatiya Oikya Front =

Political Alliance in Bangladesh

- Founder: Fazlul Karim
- Founded: 2001
- Dissolved: 2003
- Ideology: Islamism; Islamic democracy Religious nationalism Federalism; Anti-feminism
- Political position: Center to far-right
- Religion: Sunni Islam
- Seats in Jatiya Sangshad (2001): 17 / 350

Islami Jatiya Oikya Front (IJOF, lit. Islamic National United Front) was a short-lived political alliance in Bangladesh. Formed in 2001, it was one of the three principal contenders in that year's parliamentary elections. Led by the Jatiya Party (Ershad), it also included the Islami Shashontantra Andolan (ISA) and three other parties.

The founder of the ISA, Fazlul Karim, declared that IJOF's intention was to establish an Islamic government. Other planks in the party platform included transforming Bangladesh into a federation of eight autonomous provinces, and prohibiting women from becoming prime minister.

The Jatiya Party (Ershad) fielded candidates in 281 of the country's 300 parliamentary constituencies, leaving the remaining 19 to be contested by its junior partners. The front won 14 seats. It received 7.25% of the votes, and accordingly was allocated 3 of the 45 additional seats reserved for women.

The front collapsed after the 2001 election because, according to political scientist Ali Riaz, "all of the 17 seats won by the alliance were JP candidates who preferred their party affiliation in the parliament".
