= Karnakati =

Karnakati কর্ণকাঠি
- Village
- Location in Bangladesh
- Coordinates: 22°39′N 90°23′E
- Country: Bangladesh
- Division: Barisal Division
- District: Barisal District
- Upazila: Barisal Sadar Upazila

Population (2022)
  - Total: 9,471
- Time zone: UTC+6 (Bangladesh Time)

Karnakati is a village in Barisal Sadar Upazila of Barisal District in the Barisal Division of southern-central Bangladesh.

According to the 2022 Census of Bangladesh, Karnakati had 1,997 households and a population of 9,471.
