= Joysree =

Joysree জয়শ্রী
- Village
- Location in Bangladesh
- Coordinates: 22°51′N 90°17′E
- Country: Bangladesh
- Division: Barisal Division
- District: Barisal District
- Upazila: Wazirpur Upazila

Area
  - Total: 3.84 km^{2} (1.48 sq mi)

Population (2022)
  - Total: 6,396
  - Density: 1,670/km^{2} (4,310/sq mi)
- Time zone: UTC+6 (Bangladesh Time)

Joysree is a village in Wazirpur Upazila of Barisal District in the Barisal Division of southern-central Bangladesh.

According to the 2022 Census of Bangladesh, Joysree had 1,437 households and a population of 6,396. It has a total area of 3.84 km^{2} (1.48 sq mi).
