= Gazirpar =

Gazirpar গাজীরপাড়
- Village
- Location in Bangladesh
- Coordinates: 22°51′N 90°12′E
- Country: Bangladesh
- Division: Barisal Division
- District: Barisal District
- Upazila: Wazirpur Upazila

Area
  - Total: 2.48 km^{2} (0.96 sq mi)

Population (2022)
  - Total: 5,072
  - Density: 2,050/km^{2} (5,300/sq mi)
- Time zone: UTC+6 (Bangladesh Time)

Gazirpar is a village in Wazirpur Upazila of Barisal District in the Barisal Division of southern-central Bangladesh.

According to the 2022 Census of Bangladesh, Gazirpar had 1223 households and a population of 5,072. It has a total area of 2.48 km^{2} (0.96 sq mi).
