= Barisal Sadar Upazila =

Barisal Sadar বরিশাল সদর
- Upazila
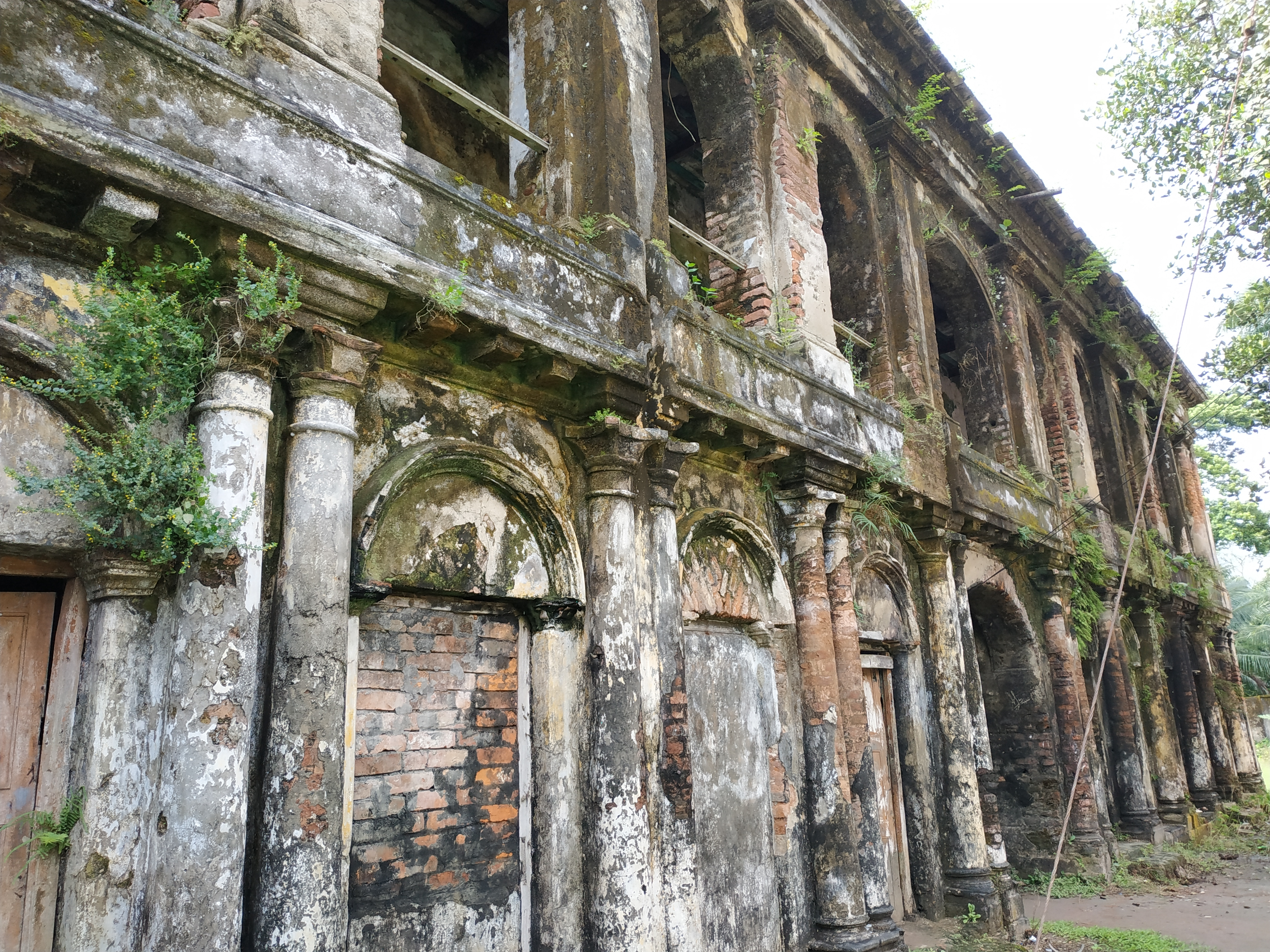
- Lakutia Zamindar Bari, Barisal

- Coordinates: 22°42′N 90°22′E
- Country: Bangladesh
- Division: Barisal Division
- District: Barisal District
- Headquarters: Barisal

Area
  - Total: 324.40 km^{2} (125.25 sq mi)

Population (2022)
  - Total: 237,211
  - Density: 731.23/km^{2} (1,893.9/sq mi)
- Time zone: UTC+6 (BST)
- Postal code: 8200
- Area code: 0431
- Website: Official Map of the Barisal Sadar Upazila

Barisal Sadar (Bengali: বরিশাল সদর) is an upazila of Barisal District in the division of Barisal, Bangladesh.

== Geography ==
Barisal Sadar is located at 22.7000°N 90.3667°E. It has a total area of 324.41 km^{2}.

== Demographics ==
Historical population
Year	Pop. (000)	±%
1981	513	—
1991	616	+20.1%
2001	724	+17.5%
2011	527	−27.2%
2022	656	+24.5%
Source: Bangladesh Bureau of Statistics

Religions in Barisal Sadar Upazila (2022)
Religion	Percent
Islam	96.30%
Hinduism	3.68%
Other or not stated	0.02%

According to the 2022 Bangladeshi census, Barishal Sadar Upazila had 55,263 households and a population of 237,211. 9.08% of the population were under 5 years of age. Barishal Sadar had a literacy rate (age 7 and over) of 80.01%: 80.56% for males and 79.48% for females, and a sex ratio of 98.81 males for every 100 females. 14,186 (5.98%) lived in urban areas.

According to the 2011 Census of Bangladesh, Barisal Sadar Upazila had 114,774 households and a population of 527,017. 104,310 (19.79%) were under 10 years of age. Barisal had a literacy rate (age 7 and over) was 69.35%, compared to the national average of 51.8%, and a sex ratio of 974 females per 1000 males. 339,308 (64.38%) lived in urban areas.

== Administration ==
UNO: Md. Mahabub Ullah Majumdar.

Barisal Sadar Upazila is divided into ten union parishads: Chandpura, Chandramohan, Char Baria, Char Kowa, Char Monai, Jagua, Kashipur, Roypasha-Karapur, Shayestabad, and Tungibaria. The union parishads are subdivided into 105 mauzas and 110 villages.

== Notable people ==
- Hayat Mahmud, feudal lord, commander and founder of Miah Bari Mosque
- Syed Faizul Karim, Islamic scholar and politician
- Syed Fazlul Karim, founder of Islami Andolan Bangladesh
- Syed Rezaul Karim, incumbent Pir of Char Monai

== See also ==
- Upazilas of Bangladesh
- Districts of Bangladesh
- Divisions of Bangladesh
- Thanas of Bangladesh
- Union councils of Bangladesh
- Administrative geography of Bangladesh
