= Jatiyo Shikkhak Forum =

Jatiyo Shikkhak Forum জাতীয় শিক্ষক ফোরাম
- President: Professor Nasir Uddin Khan
- Secretary General: Abdus Sabur
- Founded: January 16, 2015; 11 years ago
- Headquarters: 55/B (3rd Floor), Purana Paltan, Dhaka
- National affiliation: Islami Andolan Bangladesh

Website
- jatiyoshikkhakforum.org

Jatiyo Shikkhak Forum (Bengali: জাতীয় শিক্ষক ফোরাম, lit. 'National Teachers Forum') is the teacher union of Islami Andolan Bangladesh (IAB)

== Activities ==
In 2022, when the "Religion and Moral Education" exam was dropped due to the COVID-19 pandemic, the organization criticized the decision. In August 2023, the organization held nationwide human chain protests demanding the nationalization of all Ibtedayi madrasas.

On 18 January 2024, it organized a seminar in Dhaka titled Current curriculum and new textbooks: reality and future". On 10 May of the same year, the organization called for the cancellation of the Education Curriculum-2021 and provided 10 recommendations.

On 10 May 2025, the organization held a seminar at the National Press Club, where they presented 16 demands, including the formation of an education reform commission with Islamic scholars and the nationalization of the education system.

In September 2025, the organization became vocal in its demand for religious education and the appointment of religious teachers in primary schools. They have held multiple human chains and protests for this cause.
