= Atipara =

Atipara আটিপাড়া
- Village
- Location within Bangladesh
- Country: Bangladesh
- Division: Barisal Division
- District: Barisal District
- Upazila: Wazirpur Upazila

Population
  - Total: (Unknown)
- Time zone: UTC+6 (BST)
- Postal code: 8220

Atipara (Bengali: আটিপাড়া) is a village located in the Wazirpur Upazila of the Barisal District in southern Bangladesh. It is a rural settlement known for its agrarian lifestyle, peaceful environment, and close-knit community.

== Geography ==
Atipara is situated in the southern part of Bangladesh, within the Barisal Division. The village is part of the fertile delta region created by the Ganges and Brahmaputra river systems. The land is predominantly flat and surrounded by paddy fields, ponds, and canals. It lies near the Sugandha River, which influences both agriculture and daily life in the area.

== Demographics ==
The exact population of Atipara is not officially recorded, but like many rural Bangladeshi villages, it likely consists of several hundred to a few thousand residents. The majority of the villagers are Bengali Muslims, with a minority Hindu community. Bengali is the primary language spoken.

== Economy ==
Agriculture is the backbone of Atipara's economy. Farmers grow paddy, vegetables, and seasonal fruits. Some families are involved in small-scale poultry and livestock farming. There is also a growing number of young people engaged in remittance work abroad or in urban centers.

== Education ==
Atipara has access to primary and secondary education. Notable educational institutions in or near the village include:

- Atipara Government Primary School
- Nearby secondary schools and madrasas in Wazirpur Upazila

Higher education requires travel to Barisal city or other towns.

== Culture and Religion ==
The village celebrates traditional Bengali festivals such as Pohela Boishakh, Eid-ul-Fitr, Eid-ul-Adha, and Durga Puja. Mosques are central to village life, with the Atipara Jame Mosque being a key religious and social center.

== Transportation ==
Atipara is connected to nearby towns and cities by local roads. The most common modes of transport include rickshaws, vans, motorcycles, and small buses. During the monsoon season, boats are also used in surrounding areas.

== Healthcare ==
Healthcare facilities are limited. Villagers rely on the nearby community clinic or health complex in Wazirpur. For more serious treatment, people travel to Barisal city.

== Points of Interest ==
- Atipara Jame Mosque
- Local haat (village market)
- Scenic paddy fields and riverbanks
- Community ponds used for fishing and irrigation
- Atipara M.U.Fazil Madrasha

Atipara High School

== Administration ==
Atipara falls under a Union Parishad within Wazirpur Upazila. The Union Council oversees development and welfare programs in the village.

== Notable people ==
- Sardar Fazlul Karim

== See also ==
- Wazirpur Upazila
- Barisal District
- Villages of Bangladesh
