= Changuria =

Changuria চাংগুরিয়া
- Village
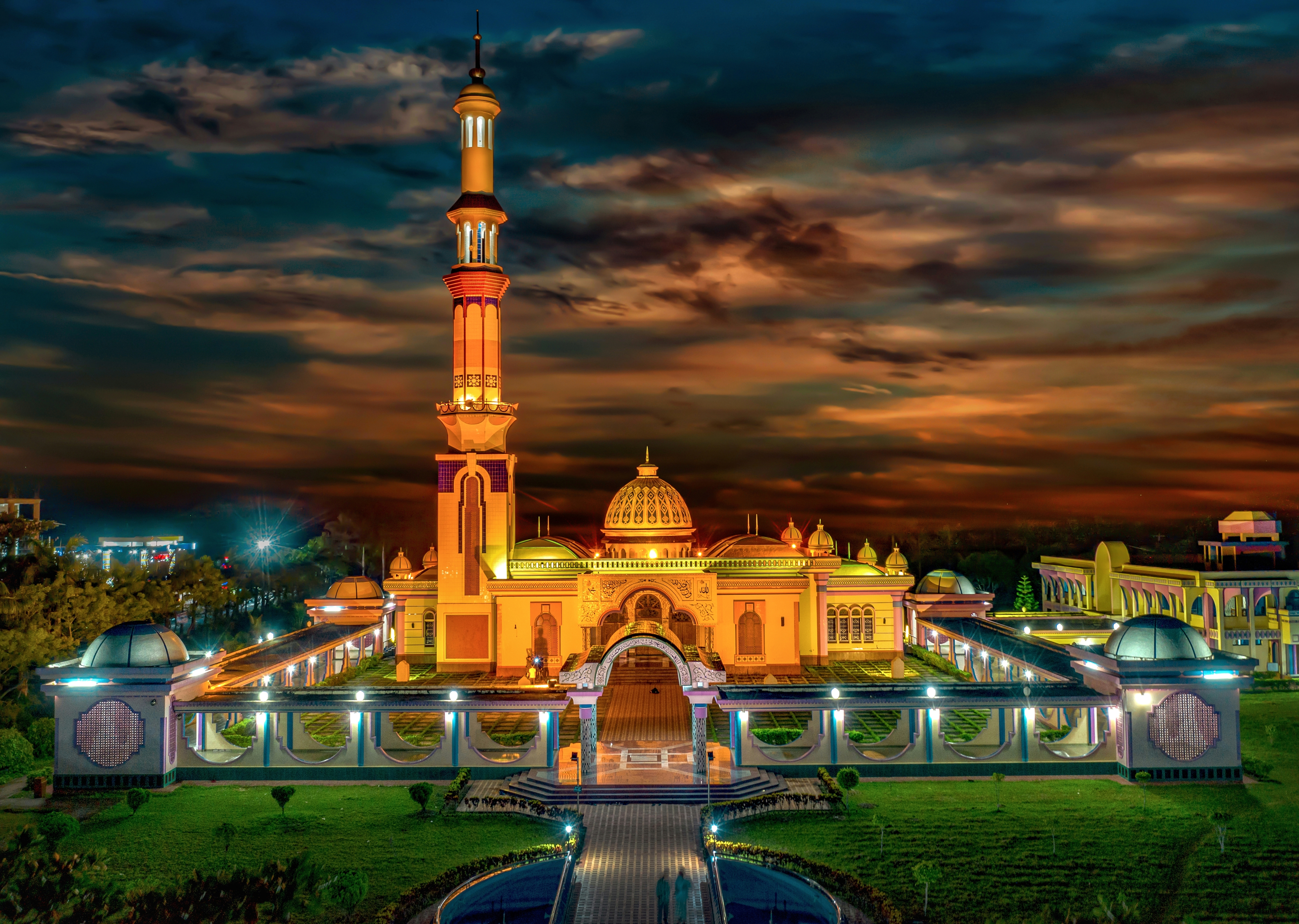
- Baitul Aman Mosque

- Location in Bangladesh
- Coordinates: 22.819293°N 90.250270°E
- Country: Bangladesh
- Division: Barisal Division
- District: Barisal District
- Upazila: Wazirpur Upazila

Area
  - Total: 1.37 km^{2} (0.53 sq mi)

Population (2022)
  - Total: 1,243
  - Density: 907/km^{2} (2,350/sq mi)
- Time zone: UTC+6 (Bangladesh Time)

Changuria is a village in Wazirpur Upazila of Barisal District in the Barisal Division of southern-central Bangladesh.

== Demography ==
According to the 2022 Census of Bangladesh, Changuria had 310 households and a population of 1,243. It has a total area of 1.37 km^{2} (0.53 sq mi).

== Tourist attraction ==
Baitul Aman Mosque is located in this village.

== Notable people ==
- Sarfuddin Ahmed Santu, MP for Barisal-2.
