= Wazirpur =

Town in Bangladesh

Wazirpur উজিরপুর
- Town
- Interactive map of Wazirpur
- Country: Bangladesh
- Division: Barisal Division
- District: Barisal District
- Upazila: Wazirpur Upazila
- Municipality established: 2013

Government
  - Type: Municipality
  - Body: Wazirpur Municipality

Area
  - Total: 6.25 km^{2} (2.41 sq mi)

Population
  - Total: 17,444
  - Density: 2,790/km^{2} (7,230/sq mi)

Wazirpur (Bengali: উজিরপুর) is a town in Wazirpur Upazila of Barisal District in Bangladesh.

== History ==
Wazirpur Municipality was established on 26 February 2013.

== Notable people ==
- Mohammad Abdul Jalil, freedom fighter & politician
- Manabendra Mukhopadhyay, musician
- Kaliprasanna Vidyaratna, scholar
