= Kaliprasanna Vidyaratna =

Indian scholar of Sanskrit

Kaliprasanna Vidyaratna (Bangabdo [1255–1330]; 1849–1924 AD) was an Indian scholar of Sanskrit, academic and author. He was the principal of the Sanskrit College between 1908 and 1910. Vidyarayna played an important role in the revival of Sanskrit language.

== Early life ==
Vidyaratna was born in a Bhattacharya Brahmin family of Ujirpur village, Backergunge district in British India. His father was Biswambhar Bhattacharya. Vidyaratna learned Sanskrit in a Chatuspathi at Dhanuka village of Faridpur district. He passed the entrance exam from Barishal and entered the Scottish Church College, Kolkata. After completion of B.A. and M.A. he was appointed as a teacher at the Dhaka Jagannath College in 1881. He worked in Presidency College since 1901, thereafter becoming principal of Sanskrit College.

== Works ==
Vidyaratna wrote and edited many books on Indian Mythology, Vaisnavism, Puranas and Hindu culture such as: Brihat Shiva Puran, Sri Sri Krishna Charit, Bedanta Darshanam, Vrhadyamagita, Brihaddharam Puran, Shib Sanhita, Sanjib Chandrer Granthabali, Kali Kaivalyadayini, Nimai-Sannyas Gitavinay, Kalki Puran, Stab Kobochmala, Kalitantra and others. Until 1918, he visited tols to encourage Sanskrit education in Bengal and played a vital role in reviving the tol system. He became the president of 'Sanskrit Sahitya Parishad'. In 1911 Vidyaratna was awarded the 'Mahamohopadhya' title.
