= Syed Muhammad Ishaq =

Bangladeshi Sufi scholar

Mawlana Syed Muhammad Ishaq Pir Saheb Charmonai
- সৈয়দ মুহম্মদ এছহাক

Personal life
- Born: 1915 Pashurikathi, Charmonai, Backergunge District, Bengal Province
- Died: 1977 (aged 61–62) Charmonai, Barisal, Bangladesh
- Children: Syed Fazlul Karim
- Education: Jamia Islamia Ibrahimia; Bhola Alia Madrasa; Darul Uloom Deoband
- Relatives: Rezaul Karim (grandson); Faizul Karim (grandson)

Religious life
- Religion: Islam
- Denomination: Sunni
- Jurisprudence: Hanafi
- Movement: Deobandi

Muslim leader
- Successor: Syed Fazlul Karim
- Disciple of: Ibrahim Ujani
- Disciples: Syed Fazlul Karim
- Influenced by: Rashid Ahmad Gangohi
- Influenced: Mohammad Abdul Jalil

Syed Muhammad Ishaq (Bengali: সৈয়দ মুহম্মদ এছহাক; 1915 – 1977) was a Bangladeshi Islamic scholar, author, mufassir, debater and educationist. He was a disciple of Ibrahim Ujani. He was the inaugural Pir of Charmonai Darbar Sharif, having founded the Charmonai Ahsanabad Rashidia Kamil Madrasa, Charmonai Lillah Boarding and Orphanage and Charmonai Jamia Rashidia Islamia, one of the largest Islamic institutional complexes in South Bengal. He was succeeded by his son, Syed Fazlul Karim, and became posthumously known by his followers as Dada Huzur.

== Early life and family ==
Ishaq was born in 1915 to a Bengali Muslim family in the village of Pashurikathi in Char Monai, located to the east of the Kirtankhola river in Backergunge District, Bengal Province. His father, Syed Amjad Ali, was a Pir figure of Charmonai.

== Education ==
Ishaq started his primary education under his uncle Syed Muhammad Abdul Jabbar of Charmonai. He then became a student of Muhammad Ibrahim of Ujani at the Jamia Islamia Ibrahimia in Kachua, Chandpur, where he furthered his Qur'anic studies. After completing the seven qira'at under his teacher, he enrolled at the Bhola Darul Hadith Alia Madrasa in Bhola Island where he passed his jamat-e-ula. Ishaq then moved to India to study at the Darul Uloom Deoband seminary in Saharanpur.

== Career ==
After returning to Bengal, Ishaq dedicated his life to teaching the Islamic sciences. In 1932, he founded the Charmonai Ahsanabad Rashidia Madrasa and Lillah Boarding (Orphanage) from his own home. It was named after his uncle Syed Ahsan and the Deobandi jurist Rashid Ahmad Gangohi respectively. He independently taught the Dars-i Nizami syllabus, before retiring in 1947. After 1947, through the efforts of Muhammad Esmatullah and his son-in-law Delwar Husain, the institution became an alia madrasa. Among his students were Syed Fazlul Karim, Muhammad Abul Bashar of Shahtali and Azharul Islam Siddiqi of Manikganj.

Ishaq was a supporter of Bangladeshi independence. During the Bangladesh Liberation War of 1971, Mohammad Abdul Jalil (commander of Sector 9), Captain Abdul Latif and other Barisali freedom fighters would seek advice and duas from Muhammad Ishaq in Charmonai. His institution, Jamia Rashidia Ahsanabad, became a base for Bengali freedom fighters where they would stay and return from battles. The institution provided two large rooms for the freedom fighters to use and accommodated for them. For the entirety of the nine-month war, several government officials based in Barisal would shelter themselves with their families at the Charmonai Madrasa.

== Works ==
Ahmad was written 27 books:

- Amparar Tafsir
- Untrish Parar Tafsir
- Sura Yasin Sharifer Tafsir
- Sura ar-Rahman Sharifer Tafsir
- Beheshter Shukh
- Dozakher Dukh
- Asheq-e-Mashuq
- Bhed-e-Marefat
- Marefate-Haq ba Talim-e-Zikr
- Hazrat Bara Qari Ibrahim Saheber Jiboni
- Khas Parda ba Shamir Khedmot
- Namaz Shikkha
- Dhoom Binash ba Dil Pak
- Tabizer Kitab
- Jihade Islam
- Pir Hoiya Abar Kafer Hoy Keno?
- Hadiyyatul Islamia (Calendar)
- Faridpure Birat Bahas
- Noakhalir Birat Bahas
- Nuzhatul Qarir Sharal Byakhya
- Eshq-e-Dewan ba Premer Gazal
- Rah-e-Jannat 116 Prakar Dua
- Sharshinar Sawal Charmonair Jawab
- Qabare Azab - Mastabara Azab Dekhi Na Keno?
- Jumar Namaz
- Zikr-e-Jali ba Waz Haaler Akatya Dalil
- Juktipurno Waz ba Mawlapaker Onushondhan

== Personal life ==
Ishaq had three wives. With Syeda Rabeya Khatun, daughter of his uncle Syed Abdul Jabbar, he had two sons (Qari Syed Mubarak Karim and Syed Fazlul Karim) and three daughters. He had one son and three daughters with his second wife, and three sons and one daughter with his third wife Amena Begum.

== Death ==
Ishaq died in 1977, and was buried in Charmonai.

== See also ==
- List of Deobandis
