= Baitul Aman Mosque =

Mosque in Wazirpur, Barisal, Bangladesh

Guthia Mosque
- বাইতুল আমান জামে মসজিদ
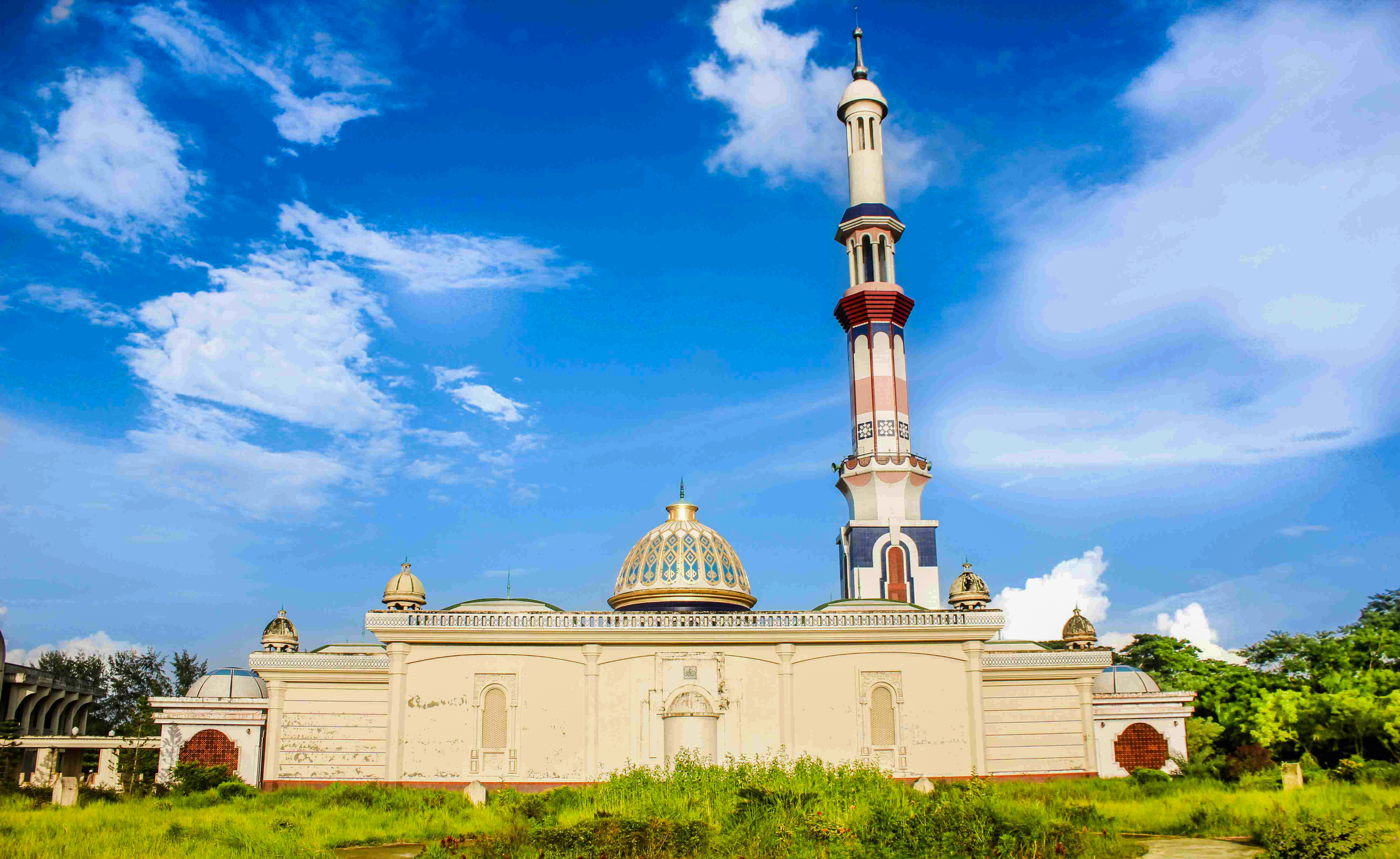

- Location within Bangladesh

Religion
- Affiliation: Islam
- Branch/tradition: Hanafi

Location
- Location: Changuria, Wazirpur, Barisal
- Country: Bangladesh
- Interactive map of Guthia Mosque
- Coordinates: 22.819293°N 90.250270°E

Architecture
- Type: mosque
- Established: 16 December 2003
- Construction cost: 200 million BDT

Specifications
- Capacity: 20,000 worshipers
- Dome: 20
- Minaret: 1
- Minaret height: 58 m (190 ft)
- Materials: marble stone

The Baitul Aman Jame Masjid Complex (Bengali: বাইতুল আমান জামে মসজিদ, Arabic: بيت الأمان جامع مسجد), commonly known as Guthia Mosque (Bengali: গুঠিয়া মসজিদ) of Barisal, is a mosque complex of Bangladesh having a land area of 14 acres, comparing to the 8.30 acres land area of the national mosque Baitul Mukarram of the country. The Baitul Aman Jame Masjid Complex consists of a mosque, a large eidgah, a graveyard, three lakes, a madrasa and an orphanage. Established on December 16, 2003, Guthia Mosque is also a tourist spot.

== Construction ==
Construction of the mosque complex began on December 16, 2003, under the supervision of SAS Foundation. A small mosque already existed. The complex is a private initiative by Sharifuddin Ahmed Santu, a local politician and businessman who lived abroad. The mosque took four years and one month to be completed. The complex was designed by architect M. Ameenul Haque.

The cost of the construction in those times was 200 million BDT. The complex was inaugurated on October 20, 2006, with three lakes, a mosque, an orphanage, a madrasa, an Eidgah and a 58-meter high minaret constructed of white marble.

== Architecture ==
The mosque's architecture is inspired by Islamic architecture from various parts of middle east. Architect M. Ameenul Haque went on a trip to the middle east with the founder to research the architecture and design of some of the most beautiful mosques in the world. He adopted the domical style for Baitul Aman mosque.

The mosque complex stands on 14 acres. The mosque itself consists of 20 domes. The three lakes surrounding the mosque are situated so that they reflect the whole mosque from different angles. Gardens are placed around the lakes and the mosque. A number of calligraphies of Ayatul Kursi are found around the mosque and the inner part of dome of the mosque also has the Ayatul Kursi carved on it. The inner wall of the mosque has the Surat ar-Rahman written on it. The inner part of the mosque has a capacity of 1,400 people, while the outer has a capacity of 5,000 people. Several thousand people can pray in the Eidgah adjacent to the mosque at a time. The 58 meters high minaret of the mosque is the tallest in the country. A graveyard stands on the south-eastern part of the complex.

== Gallery ==
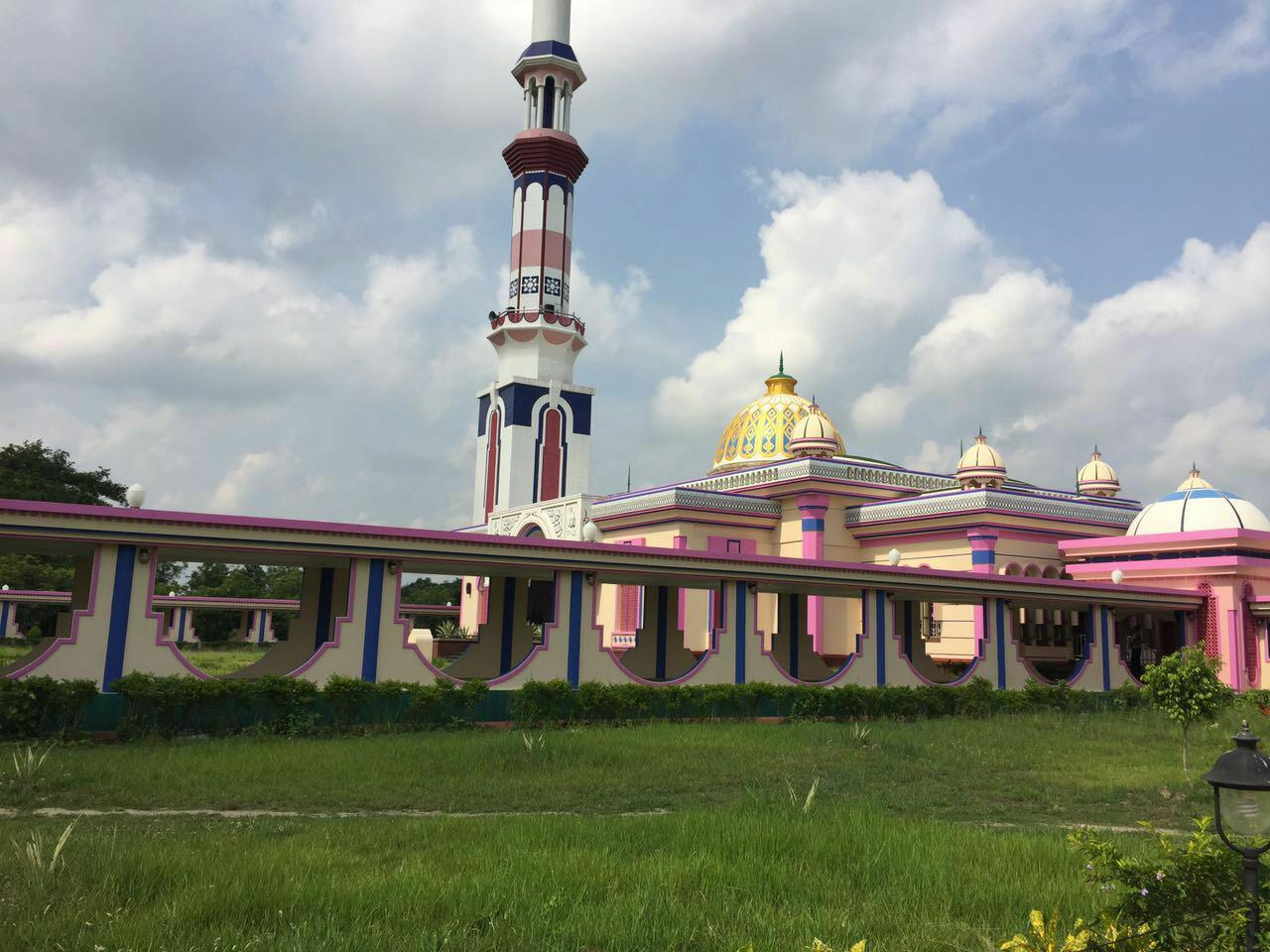
The mosque in 2016

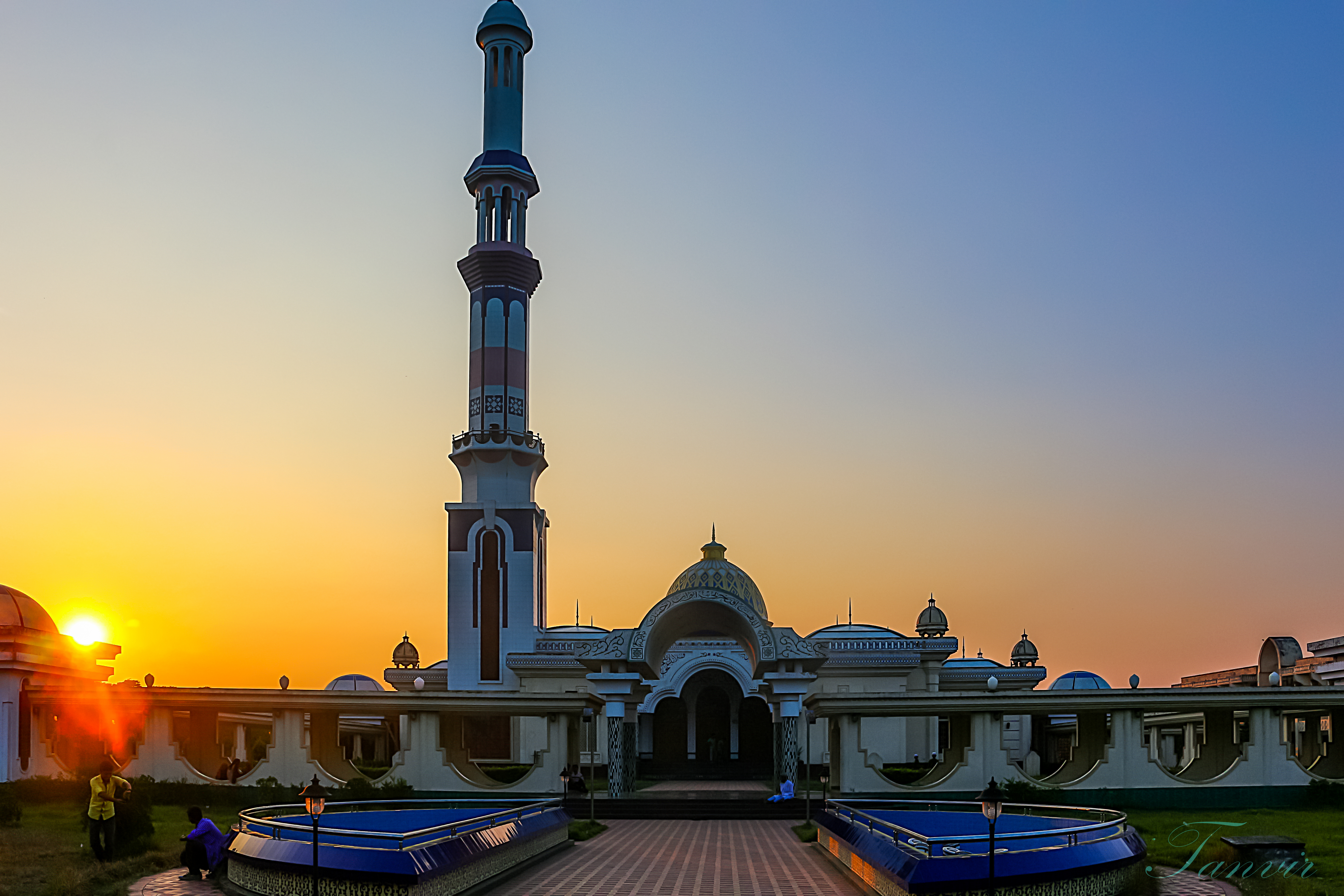
Guthia Mosque at dusk

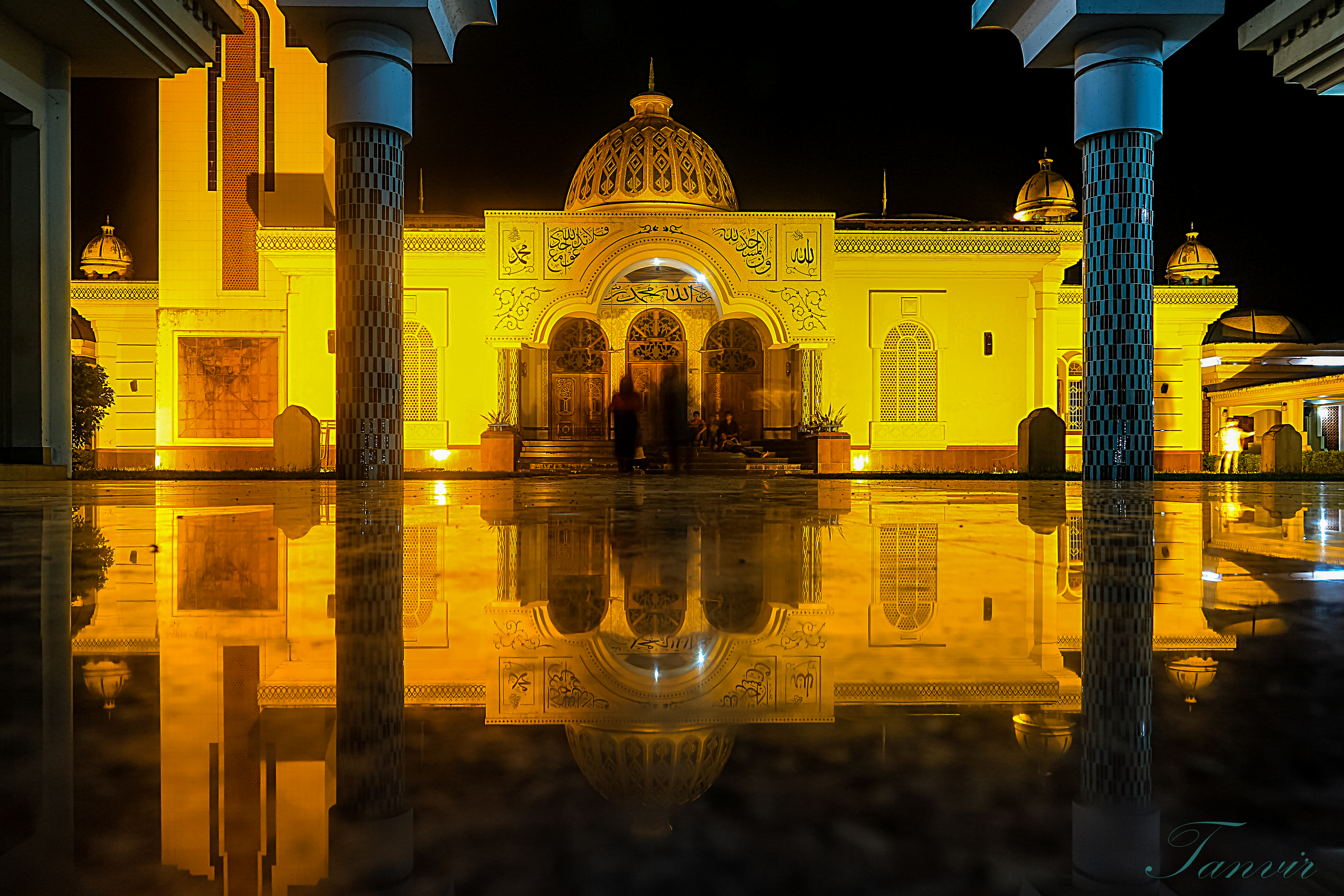
Entrance to main prayer hall

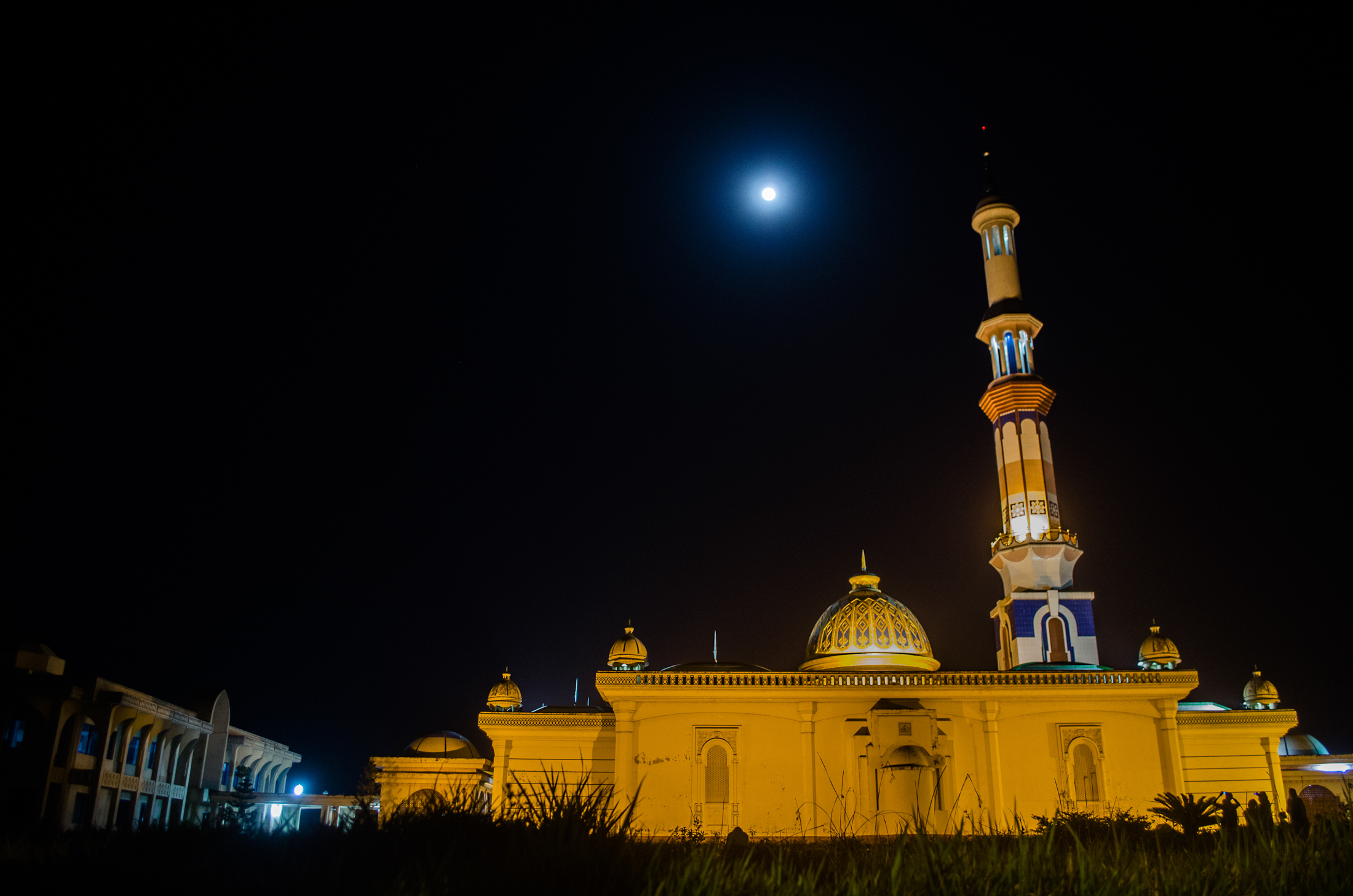
Baitul Aman Jame Masjid Complex, Guthia at night

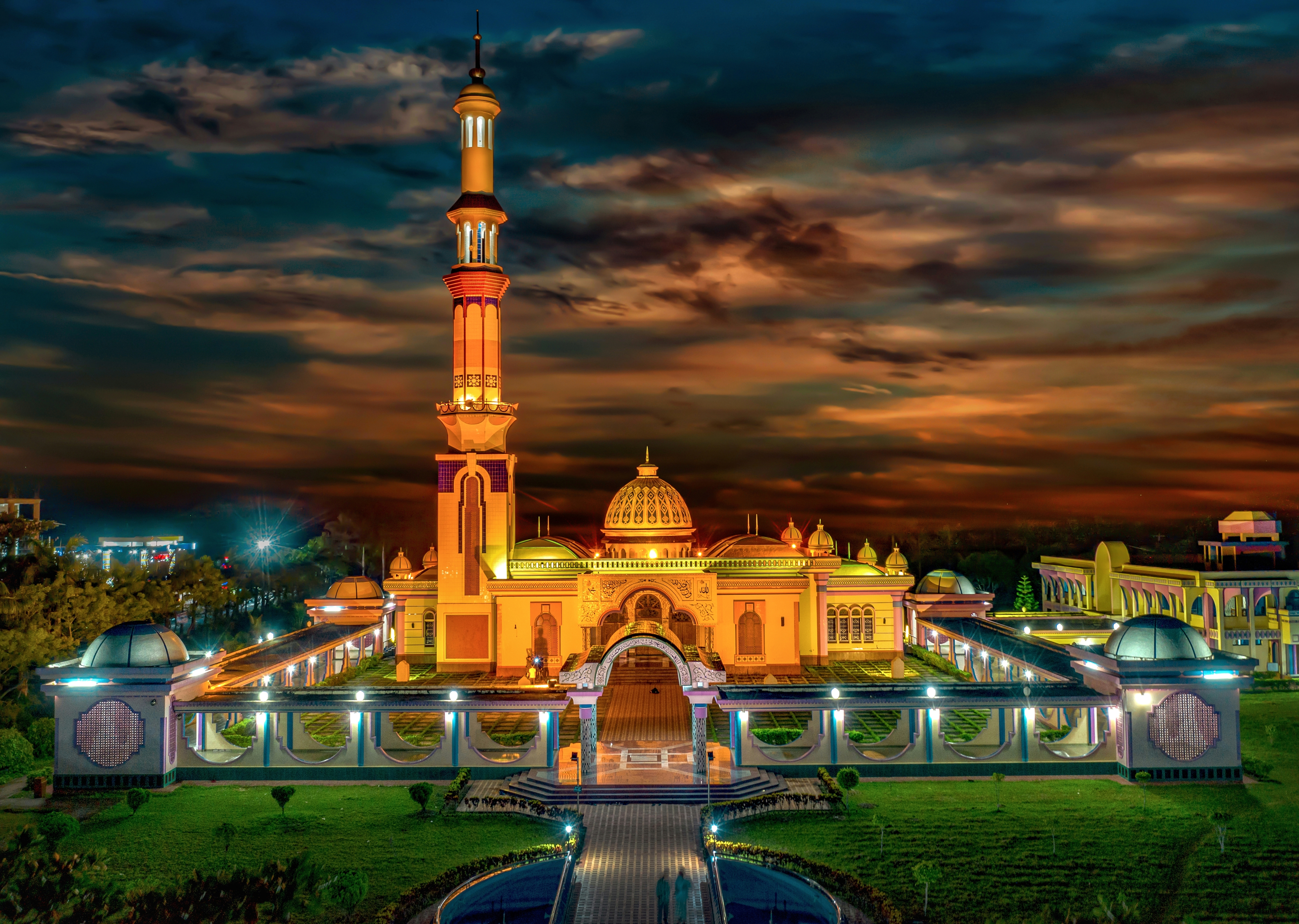
The mosque at night

== See also ==
- Baitul Mukarram
