= Sardar Fazlul Karim =

Bangladeshi philosopher (1925–2014)

- সরদার ফজলুল করিম
- Born: 1 May 1925; Atipara, Backergunge District, Bengal Presidency
- Died: 15 June 2014 (aged 89)
- Education: Dacca University
- Occupations: Academic, philosopher, translator, political activist, essayist
- Writing career
- Genres: essay, translation
- Notable awards: Independence Day Award (2000); Bangla Academy Literary Award

Member of the 2nd National Assembly of Pakistan
- In office 1955–1958

Sardar Fazlul Karim (Bengali: সরদার ফজলুল করিম; 1 May 1925 – 15 June 2014) was a Bangladeshi academic, philosopher and essayist.

== Early life and family ==
Sardar Fazlul Karim was born on 1 May 1925, to a lower middle class family in the village of Atipara located in the Backergunge District of the Bengal Presidency (present-day Wazirpur Upazila, Barisal District, Bangladesh). His father, Khabiruddin Sardar, was a farmer, and his mother, Safura Begum, was a housewife. He had one brother and three sisters, and they grew up in the village.

== Education ==
When Karim was a high school student, Saratchandra Chatterjee's novel Pather Dabi (Demand for a Pathway) inspired him to dream of a revolution. He matriculated from Barisal Zilla School in 1940.

He completed his Intermediate of Arts (IA) at Dhaka Intermediate College in 1942. He then became a student of Dacca University, initially studying English but soon shifting to philosophy because Haridas Bhattacharya's class lectures had attracted him. He earned an honors BA, and in 1946, an MA.

== Career ==
In 1954, while in prison, he was elected to the East Bengal Legislative Assembly as a Jukto Front candidate. He was released in 1955 by the United Front government.

He was elected to the National Assembly of Pakistan in 1955. Arrested again during martial law, he was released in 1962.

He left politics in 1963 and joined the translation section of the Bangla Academy. From 1969 to 1971 he directed the academy's cultural section.

In 1972, after Bangladesh won its independence, he rejoined Dacca University as a professor of political science.

Karim wrote scholarly books on philosophy, among them his দর্শনকোষ (Encyclopedia of Philosophy). He has translated Plato, Aristotle, Rousseau and Engels.

== Published work ==
Bengali Translation:

*প্লেটোর রিপাবলিক	Plator Republic	(Republic by Plato)	-
*প্লেটোর সংলাপ	Plator Republic	(Plato's Dialogues)	-
*এরিস্টোটল-এর পলিটিক্স	Aristotler Politics	(Politics by Aristotle)	-
*এঙ্গেলস্‌-এর এ্যান্টি ডুরিং	Engelser Anti-Dühring	(Anti-Dühring by Friedrich Engels)	-
*রুশোর- সোশ্যাল কন্ট্রাক্ট	Rousseaur Social Contract	(Social Contract by Jean-Jacques Rousseau)	-
*রুশোর- দি কনফেশনস	Rousseaur The Confessions	(The Confessions by Jean-Jacques Rousseau)	-
Memoirs, essays and others:
* দর্শনকোষ	Darshankosh	(Bengali Encyclopedia of Philosophy)	-
* শহীদ জ্যোতির্ময় গুহঠাকুরতা স্মারকগ্রন্থ	-	(-)	-
* সেই সে কাল:কিছু স্মৃতি কিছু কথা	-	(-)	-
* ঢাকা বিশ্ববিদ্যালয় ও পূর্ববঙ্গীয় সমাজঃ অধ্যাপক আব্দুর রাজ্জাকের আলাপচারিতা	-	(-)	-
* চল্লিশের দশকের ঢাকা	-	(-)	-
* নানা কথা	-	(-)	-
* নানা কথার পরের কথা	-	(-)	-
* নূহের কিশতী ও অন্যান্য প্রবন্ধ	-	(-)	-
* রুমীর আম্মা ও অন্যান্য প্রবন্ধ	-	(-)	-
* গল্পের গল্প	-	(-)	-
*পাঠ-প্রসঙ্গ	Paath Proshanga	(On Reading)	-
* আরেক যুগে যুগোস্লাভিয়ায়	-	(-)	-

== Founder of ==
Atipara M U Fazil Madrashah One of the best Islamic Institute in the district. Anena Khatun Trust

== Recognition ==
Karim received the Bangla Academy Literary Award in 1976, and the Independence Day Award in 2000.
