= Islami Jubo Andolan Bangladesh =

Youth organization in Bangladesh

Islami Jubo Andolan Bangladesh ইসলামী যুব আন্দোলন বাংলাদেশ
- Emblem

- Flag
- President: Atikur Rahman Mujahid
- Vice President: Engr. Md. Maruf Sheikh
- Secretary General: Mufti Mansur Ahmad Saki
- Founded: July 28, 2016; 9 years ago
- Headquarters: 55/B (3rd Floor), Purana Paltan, Dhaka
- Ideology: Islamism; Conservatism
- Position: Right-wing
- Colours: Green
- National affiliation: Islami Andolan Bangladesh
- Website: www.ijabd.org//

Islami Jubo Andolan Bangladesh (Bengali: ইসলামী যুব আন্দোলন বাংলাদেশ, lit. 'Islamic Youth Movement Bangladesh') (IJAB) is the youth wing of Islami Andolan Bangladesh (IAB), It was officially established in 2016.

== History ==
In a bid to intensify the Islamic movement by recognizing the needs of the youth, "Islami Jubo Andolon Bangladesh" (Islamic Youth Movement Bangladesh) was launched on Thursday, July 28, 2016, through an announcement by its leader, Hazrat Maulana Mufti Syed Muhammad Rezaul Karim Pir Saheb Charmonai.

== Leadership ==
The central president of the organization is Atikur Rahman Mujahid, Central Vice President is Engr. Md. Maruf Sheikh, Secretary-general is Mufti Mansur Ahmad Saki.

== Activities ==
The Historical Charmonai Annual Mahfil, organized by the Bangladesh Mujahid Committee, hosts the yearly Islami Jubo Andolan Bangladesh's Youth Rally and the Historical Youth Mass Gathering.

On November 18, 2023, Islami Jubo Andolan Bangladesh organized a protest march to demand the cancellation of the unilateral election schedule that was declared by the then-government in a farce of an illegal election.
