= Char Monai Union =

Char Monai Union চরমোনাই ইউনিয়ন
- Union Council
- No. 5 Charmonai Union Council
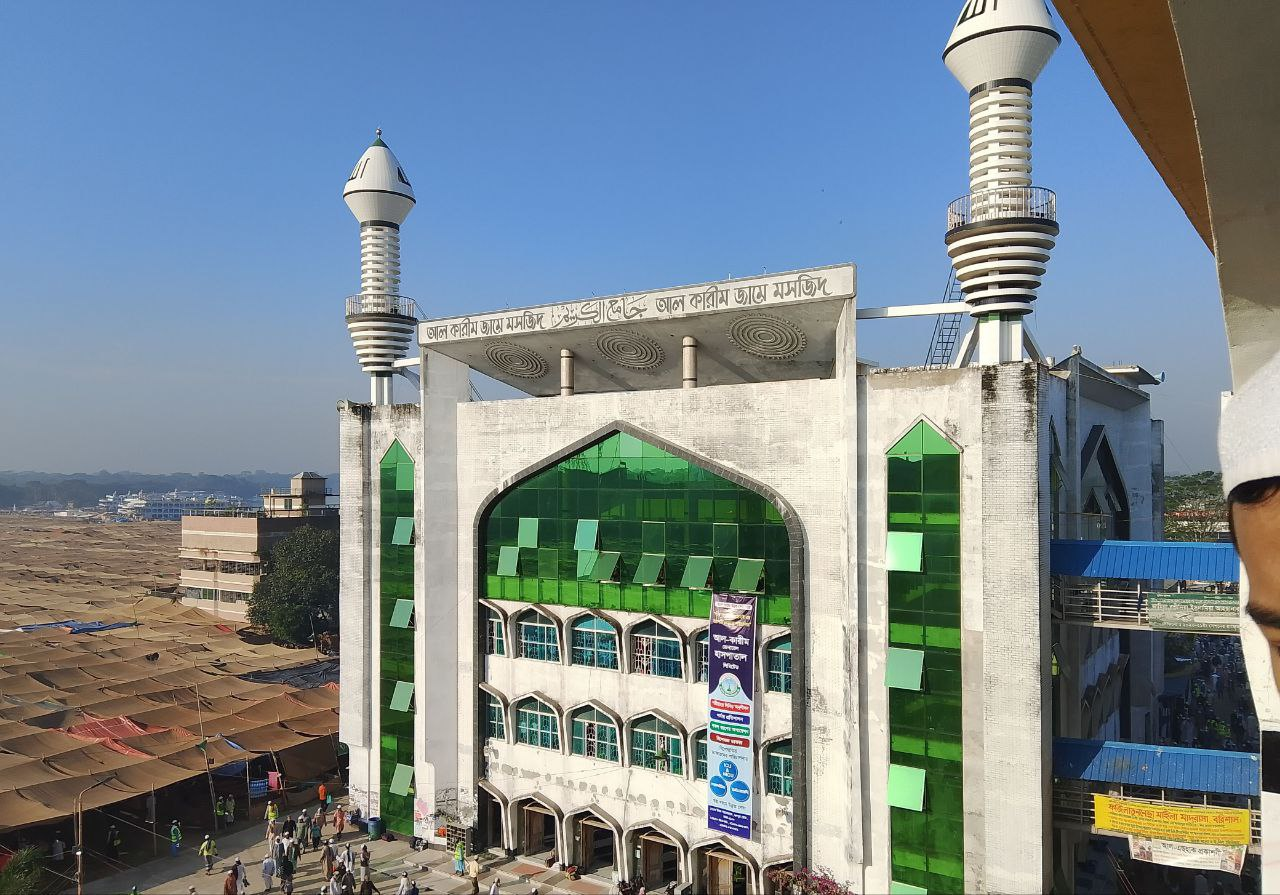
- Al-Karim Jame Mosque in Charmonai

- Location in Bangladesh
- Coordinates: 22°43′N 90°27′E
- Country: Bangladesh
- Division: Barisal Division
- District: Barisal District
- Upazila: Barisal Sadar Upazila
- Incorporated: 20 March 1964

Government
  - Chairman: Syed Ziaul Karim
  - MP (Barisal-5): Mujibur Rahman Sarwar

Population
  - Total: 33,825
- Demonym: Charmonaiya
- Time zone: UTC+6 (BST)
- Postal code: 8200
- Area code: 8200
- Website: charmonaiup.barisal.gov.bd

Char Monai Union (Bengali: চর মোনাই), also spelt Charmonai (Bengali: চরমোনাই), is an administrative union of Barisal District in the division of Barisal in southern-central Bangladesh. It's the spiritual centre of Islami Andolan Bangladesh party.

== Geography ==
To the west of Char Monai Union is Kirtankhola River and Char Baria Union, to the east is Elisha River, to the north is Arial Khan River and to the south is Karaitala River, Char Kauwa Union, Chandpura Union and Saheb Hat of Tungibaria Union. Bishwas Hat Canal, Dingamanik-Bukhainagar Canal, Gilatali-Pashurikathi Canal, Charmonai-Rajarchar Canal, Charbukhainagar and Nalchar Canal flow through this union.

== History ==
Char Monai Union is traditionally understood to occupy land that once formed part of the Kirtankhola River as it flowed past Barisal, within a dynamic riverine landscape characterised by sedimentation and channel shifts. Over time, a small alluvial shoal (locally known as a char) emerged in the midstream of the river through natural depositional processes. According to tradition, a Muslim dervish known as Monai Pagal settled on this newly formed land, where he constructed a modest thatched dwelling and devoted himself to establishing prayers and fasting. The locality subsequently derived its name, Char Monai (“Monai’s shoal”), in reference to this individual. During the Mughal period, an Alid sayyid from Baghdad known as Syed Ali Akbar settled in the village of Pashurikathi, founding the influential Syed family of Charmonai. Through the efforts of Syed Muhammad Ishaq, a graduate of Darul Uloom Deoband, the Charmonai Darbar Sharif became a major center of Islamic education, childcare and spirituality in South Bengal, and later much of Bangladesh.

On 20 March 1964, the Char Monai Union was officially established, comprising 15 villages with its headquarters in Charmonai village. During the Bangladesh Liberation War of 1971, Mohammad Abdul Jalil (commander of Sector 9), Captain Abdul Latif and other Bengali freedom fighters would regularly seek advice and supplications from Pir Syed Muhammad Ishaq at the Charmonai Darbar Sharif. The Charmonai madrasas became a lodge for Bengali freedom fighters where they would stay and return from various battles. The freedom fighters were provided two large rooms to use and they were accommodated for. For the entirety of the nine-month war, several government officials based in Barisal would shelter themselves with their families at the Charmonai madrasas.

== Administration ==
Char Monai Union constitutes the no. 5 union council of Barisal Sadar Upazila. It contains 15 villages.

1. Char Monai Village
2. Chatua
3. Char Gopalpur
4. Rajdhar
5. Isagura
6. Mukarram Pratab
7. Char Bukhainagar
8. Char Khanam
9. Farfariatala
10. Dingamanik
11. Rajarchar
12. Saluka
13. Pashurikathi
14. Gilatali
15. Char Hogla

=== List of chairmen ===
Name	Term	Notes
Mirza Abdul Hamid		
Mawlana Abdul Mannan		
Master Muhammad Khalilur Rahman		
Abdus Salam Rarhi		
Syed Rezaul Karim	2003-2011	
Syed Ziaul Karim	Present	

== Demographics ==
The Union is home to the Charmonai Ahsanabad Rashidia Kamil Madrasa, Charmonai Jamia Rashidia Islamia, Charhogla Ishaatul Islam Model Madrasa, Saluka Azizia Dakhil Madrasa, Rajdhar-Bukhainagar Hafizia Madrasa and Nalchar Dakhil Madrasa.

== Notable people ==
- Syed Muhammad Ishaq (1915–1977), Islamic scholar and inaugural Pir of Charmonai Darbar Sharif
- Syed Fazlul Karim (1935–2006), 2nd Pir of Charmonai
- Syed Rezaul Karim (born 1971), current Pir of Charmonai
- Syed Faizul Karim (born 1973), senior vice-president of Islami Andolan Bangladesh

== See also ==
- Barisal Division
- Barisal District
