= Syed Faizul Karim =

Bangladeshi Islamic scholar and Politician

Mawlānā Syed Faizul Karim
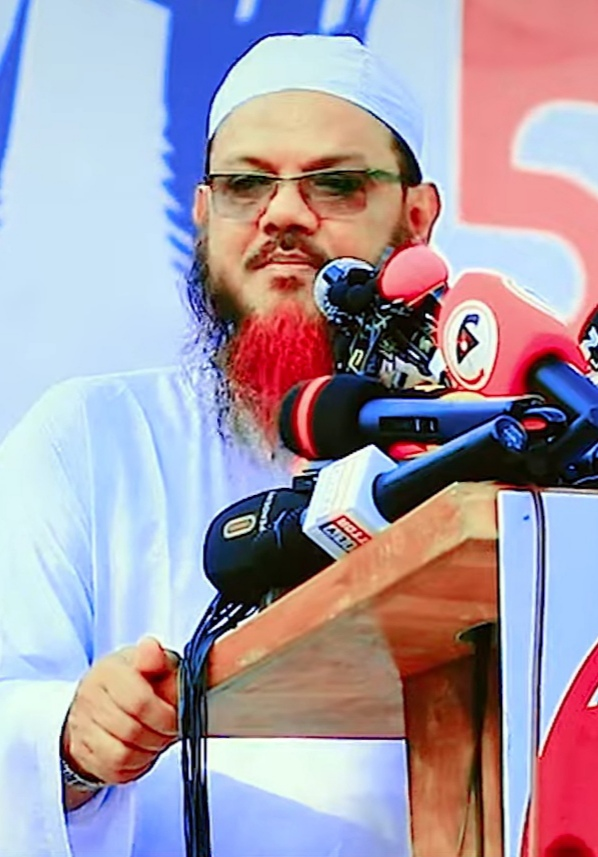
- Faizul Karim in 2024

Nayeb-e-Ameer of Islami Andolan Bangladesh
- Incumbent
- Assumed office 25 November 2006
- Emir: Syed Rezaul Karim
- Preceded by: Syed Fazlul Karim

Personal details
- Born: 10 January 1973 (age 53) Char Monai, Barisal, Bangladesh
- Party: Islami Andolan Bangladesh
- Education: Charmonai Jamia Rashidiya Islamia; Jamia Islamia Darul Uloom Madania

Personal life
- Parent: Syed Fazlul Karim (father)
- Main interests: Hadith; Politics
- Other name: Shaikh-e Charmonai
- Relatives: Syed Muhammad Ishaq (grandfather); Syed Rezaul Karim (brother)

Religious life
- Religion: Islam
- Denomination: Sunni
- Jurisprudence: Hanafi
- Movement: Deobandi

Muslim leader
- Disciple of: Shah Ahmad Shafi

Syed Faizul Karim (Bengali: সৈয়দ ফয়জুল করিম; born 10 January 1973) is a Bangladeshi Islamic scholar and politician. He is known as Shaikh-e-Charmonai to his supporters. He is senior nayeb-e-emir of Islami Andolan Bangladesh. He is also the vice president of Bangladesh Mujahid Committee and Bangladesh Quran Education Board and a central member of Befaqul Madarisil Arabia Bangladesh. During his student life, he served as the central president of the Islami Chhatra Andolan Bangladesh.

== Early life and family ==
Faizul Karim was born on 10 January 1973 in Char Monai Union of Barisal district. He belonged to a Bengali Muslim family who were the hereditary Pirs of Charmonai. His father, Syed Fazlul Karim, and grandfather, Syed Muhammad Ishaq, were the leaders of the Charmonai Darbar. He has a total of 6 brothers and 1 sister, including Syed Rezaul Karim.

== Education ==
He started his education from Jamia Rashidia Islamia Charmonai, founded by his grandfather. He passed Kamil from its Alia branch in 1995. He also attended classes in its Qawmi branch. After that, he passed first division in Fiqh and Hadith from Sagardi Islamia Kamil Madrasa, Barisal. He studied at Jamia Islamia Darul Uloom Madania for some time.

== Career ==
After completing his education, he joined Charmonai Jamia Rashidia Islamia as a teacher in Alia branch. Later, he was the assistant principal of both Alia and Qawmi branches for a long time. After his father's death on 25 November 2006, he held various positions in Islami Andolan Bangladesh and Bangladesh Mujahid Committee. He was involved in Islami Chhatra Andolan Bangladesh since his student life. Later he served as the president of its Central Committee.

== Controversy ==
=== University of Dhaka ===
In 2016, a lot of controversy arose over a speech he gave about University of Dhaka. Where he claimed, University of Dhaka could not be established in 1911 due to the opposition of Hindus. The foundation stone of DU was laid in 1921 on the proposal of a Muslim man, Nawab of Dhaka, Sir Khwaja Salimullah. So it is a Muslim university and no atheist can live there. Regarding the curriculum, he said, "A syllabus that does not include the biography of the Prophet (PBUH), does not include the biography of Umar, does not include the biography of such great people - such syllabus books will not be taught or even allowed to be read in Bangladesh."

=== Sculpture row ===
On 13 November 2020, he opposed the sculpture of Sheikh Mujibur Rahman under the construction in Gandaria in Jatrabari. Later, a national debate started. After various reactions, sedition case was filed against him and the PBI took the investigation into the case.

== See also ==
- List of Deobandis
