= Syed Rezaul Karim =

Bangladeshi Islamic scholar and politician

Amirul Mujahidin, Mufti Syed Rezaul Karim
- সৈয়দ রেজাউল করিম
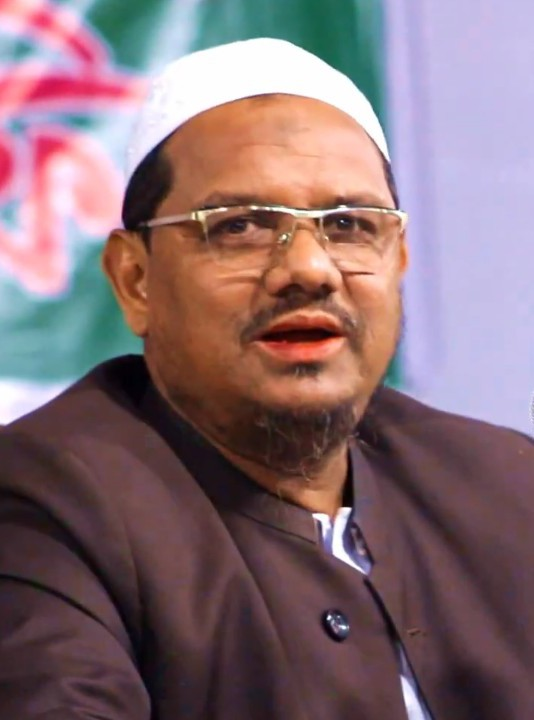
- Karim in 2019

Ameer of Islami Andolan Bangladesh
- Incumbent
- Assumed office 25 November 2006
- Secretary-General: Yunus Ahmad
- Preceded by: Syed Fazlul Karim

Personal details
- Born: 1 February 1971 (age 55) Char Monai, Barisal
- Party: Islami Andolan Bangladesh
- Parent: Syed Fazlul Karim (father)
- Relatives: Syed Muhammad Ishaq (grandfather); Syed Faizul Karim (brother)
- Education: Jamia Islamia Darul Uloom Madania; Charmonai Jamia Rashidia Islamia; Sagardi Islamia Kamil Madrasa

Personal life
- Era: Modern
- Main interest(s): Politics, Tasawwuf
- Notable works: Islamic Labor Movement; Islamic Youth Movement; National Teachers Forum; National Council of Ulama Mashayekh Aimma; National Bar Council; National Freedom Fighters Council

Religious life
- Religion: Islam
- Denomination: Sunni
- Jurisprudence: Hanafi
- Movement: Deobandi

Muslim leader
- Influenced: Syed Faizul Karim

Syed Rezaul Karim (born 1 February 1971), also known by his title Charmonai Pir, is a Bangladeshi Islamic scholar, politician, who serving as the Emir of Islami Andolan Bangladesh. He is also President of the Bangladesh Mujahid Committee and Bangladesh Quran Education Board, and the Vice President of Befaqul Madarisil Arabia Bangladesh.

== Early life and family ==
Rezaul Karim was born on 1 February 1971 in the village of Char Monai in Barisal, East Pakistan. His grandfather, Syed Muhammad Ishaq, was the first Pir of Charmonai, and his father, Syed Fazlul Karim, was the second Pir of Charmonai.

== Education ==
He started his education from Charmonai Jamia Rashidia Islamia. He passed Kamil (post-graduate) from its Alia branch in 1991. At the same time, he used to attend classes in its Qawmi branch. Then he obtained higher degree in Fiqh and Hadith from Sagardi Islamia Kamil Madrasa, Barisal. He studied at Jamia Islamia Darul Uloom Madania for some time.

== Career ==
After completing his education, he joined Charmonai Jamia Rashidia Islamia as a teacher of its Alia branch. Then he was assistant principals of both the branches (Alia and Qawmi) for long time. Currently, he is the main patron of both branches. He is also the President of the Bangladesh Quran Education Board and co-president of Befaqul Madarisil Arabia Bangladesh.

He served as the chairman of Char Monai Union for two terms from 2003 to 2011.

After the death of his father on 25 November 2006, he was elected Amir of Islami Andolan Bangladesh and Bangladesh Mujahideen Committee.

== Politics ==
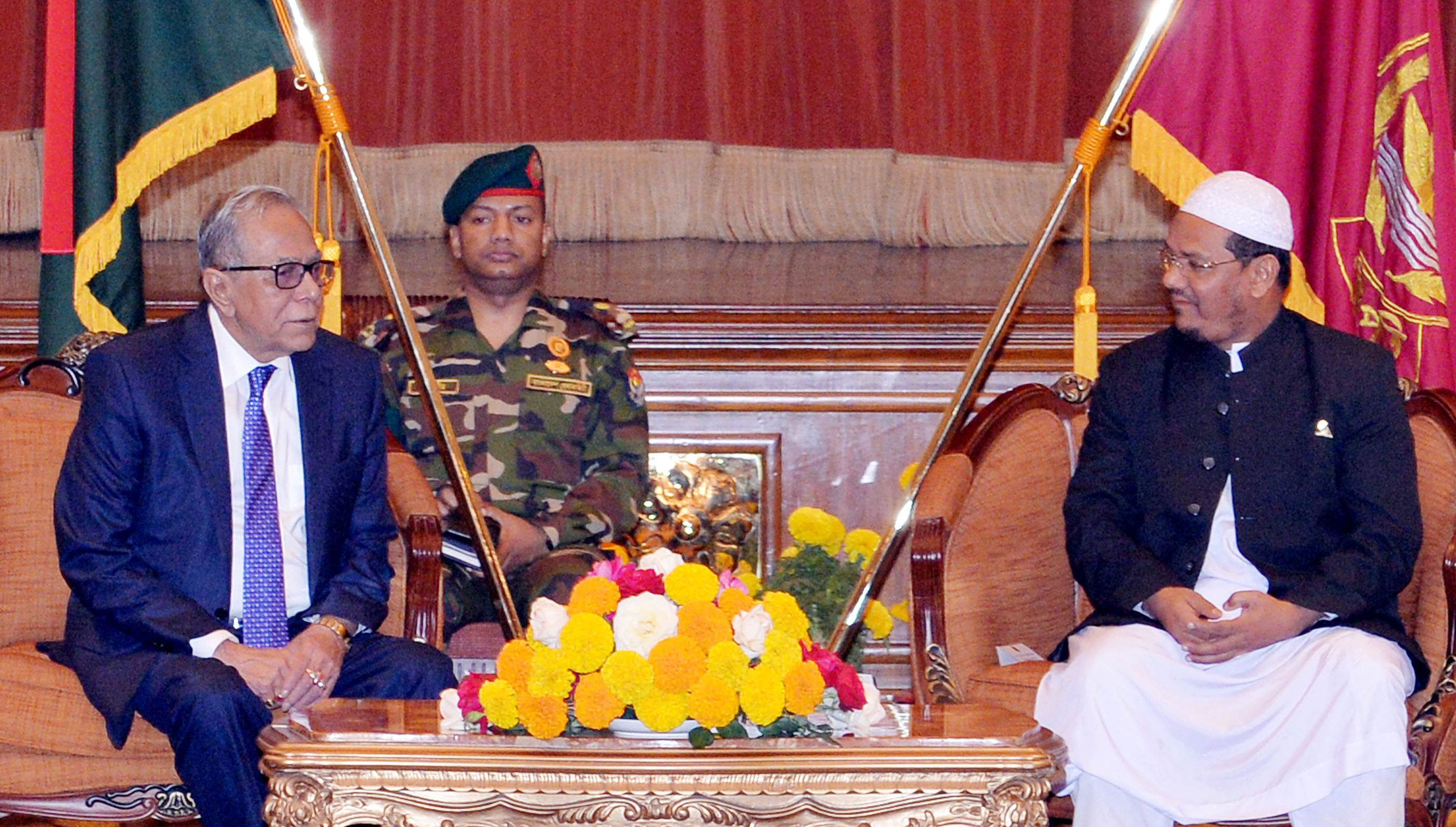
Karim with President Abdul Hamid in 2017

From his student life, he was involved in politics of Islami Shasantantra Chhatra Andolan. Later he served as the Student Welfare Secretary of its Central Committee. He was arrested during the Four-party coalition government led by BNP for his activism in the Islamic movement.

== Views ==
=== Criticism of Sheikh Hasina ===
At a conference in June 2019, Sheikh Hasina said about Hijab, "Hand socks, foot socks, nose and eyes covered, absolutely, what is it? Wandering around as living tents; It doesn't make sense." Rezaul Karim called her statement irresponsible and called for her withdrawal.

== See also ==
- List of Deobandis
