= Mohammad Abdul Jalil =

Bangladeshi military leader (1942–1989)

- মোহম্মদ আব্দুল জলীল

Personal details
- Born: 9 February 1942 Wazirpur, Backergunge District, Bengal
- Died: 19 November 1989 (aged 47) Islamabad, Pakistan
- Party: Jatiyo Samajtantrik Dal (Jasod)
- Profession: Military officer, politician
- Awards: Independence Award (2026)

Military service
- Allegiance: Pakistan; Bangladesh
- Branch/service: Bangladesh Army; Pakistan Army (before 1971)
- Years of service: 1962-1972
- Rank: Major
- Commands: Commander of Sector IX
- Battles/wars: Indo-Pakistani War of 1965; Bangladesh Liberation War

Religious life
- Religion: Islam
- Denomination: Sunni
- Jurisprudence: Hanafi
- Tariqa: Chishti
- Movement: Deobandi

Muslim leader
- Disciple of: Muhammadullah Hafezzi
- Influenced by: Syed Muhammad Ishaq Alauddin Sabir Kaliyari Moinuddin Chishti

Mohammad Abdul Jalil (Bengali: মোহম্মদ আব্দুল জলীল; 9 February 1942 – 19 November 1989) was a freedom fighter and Mukti Bahini Sector Commander of Sector 9 during the 1971 Bangladesh Liberation War. He was one of the founding members of the political party Jatiyo Samajtantrik Dal. In 2026, he was posthumously awarded Independence Award, the highest civilian honour of Bangladesh.

== Early years ==
Mohammad Abdul Jalil was born on 9 February 1942 at his maternal home in Wazirpur Sadar, Backergunge District. He was the son of SME businessman Janab Ali and homemaker Rabeya Khatun. He passed the matriculation examination from Wazirpur WB Union Institution in 1959 and the Intermediate of Arts examination from Murray Young Cadet Institution.

== Career ==
Abdul Jalil joined the Pakistan army in 1962 as a cadet. He obtained his graduation and Master of Arts in history during his service in the army. Abdul Jalil was promoted to captain in 1965 and was elevated to the position of major in 1970. In February 1971, he came to Barisal on leave from his place of posting in Multan and later joined the Bangladesh Liberation War as a Sector 9 commander. Major Abdul Jalil, Captain Abdul Latif and other Bengali freedom fighters would regularly seek advice and supplications from Syed Muhammad Ishaq, the Pir of Charmonai Darbar Sharif. The Charmonai madrasas became a lodge for Bengali freedom fighters where they would stay and return from various battles. The freedom fighters were provided two large rooms to use and they were accommodated for. For the entirety of the nine-month war, several government officials based in Sector 9 would shelter themselves with their families at the Charmonai madrasas.

Jalil was removed from the position of Sector commander in November. He ignored it and continued to fight for the country until it achieved final independence. On December 17, he entered Khulna city in triumph with the allied forces. Brigadier Hayat Khan, the commander of the Pakistan army, surrendered at the Khulna Circuit House with 8,000 soldiers. Subsequently, following independence, he was arrested on 31 December 1971 by freedom fighter of Sector 8 on a charge of misconduct. In his memoir Arakhsmita Swadhinata‑i Paradhinata, he claimed that he was detained because he had opposed Indian troops’ post-war looting in the Khulna–Jessore region. Kamal Siddiqui, the then deputy commissioner of Khulna, later wrote that Jalil was involved in multiple abuses of power in Khulna, including kidnapping, extortion, and seizure of property. He was released on July 7, 1972.

Jalil had a pioneering role in floating the new political party Jatiyo Samajtantrik Dal (JSD) in October 1972. At the inception of the party, he was the joint convener, and was elected chairman of the party in the council session held on 26 December 1972. The JSD under his leadership endeavored to establish "scientific socialism" in the country and was altogether active in anti-government politics. Jalil contested from seven constituencies in the Jatiya Sangsad elections in 1973 but was not elected. Jalil was arrested while launching a program of the party activists to besiege the official residence of the then Home Minister on 17 March 1974. He was released on 8 November 1975. Jalil was again arrested on 25 November by the martial law government for his alleged conspiracy for the overthrow of the government and attempts at usurping state power. He was sentenced to life imprisonment in a trial by the special military tribunal. He was, however, released on 24 March 1980.

Jalil contested the presidential election in 1981 as a nominee of the three-party alliance of JSD, Workers Party, and Krishak Sramik Samajbadi Dal. He left the chairmanship of the JSD in 1984. He started a party called Jatiya Mukti Andolon. At this time he was active in creating Shommilito Shongram Parishad, under the leadership of Hafezzi Huzur. He was under house-arrest in January 1985 for one month. He was put in Dhaka Central Jail from 30 December 1987 to March 1988, for joining the protest against autocrat Ershad.

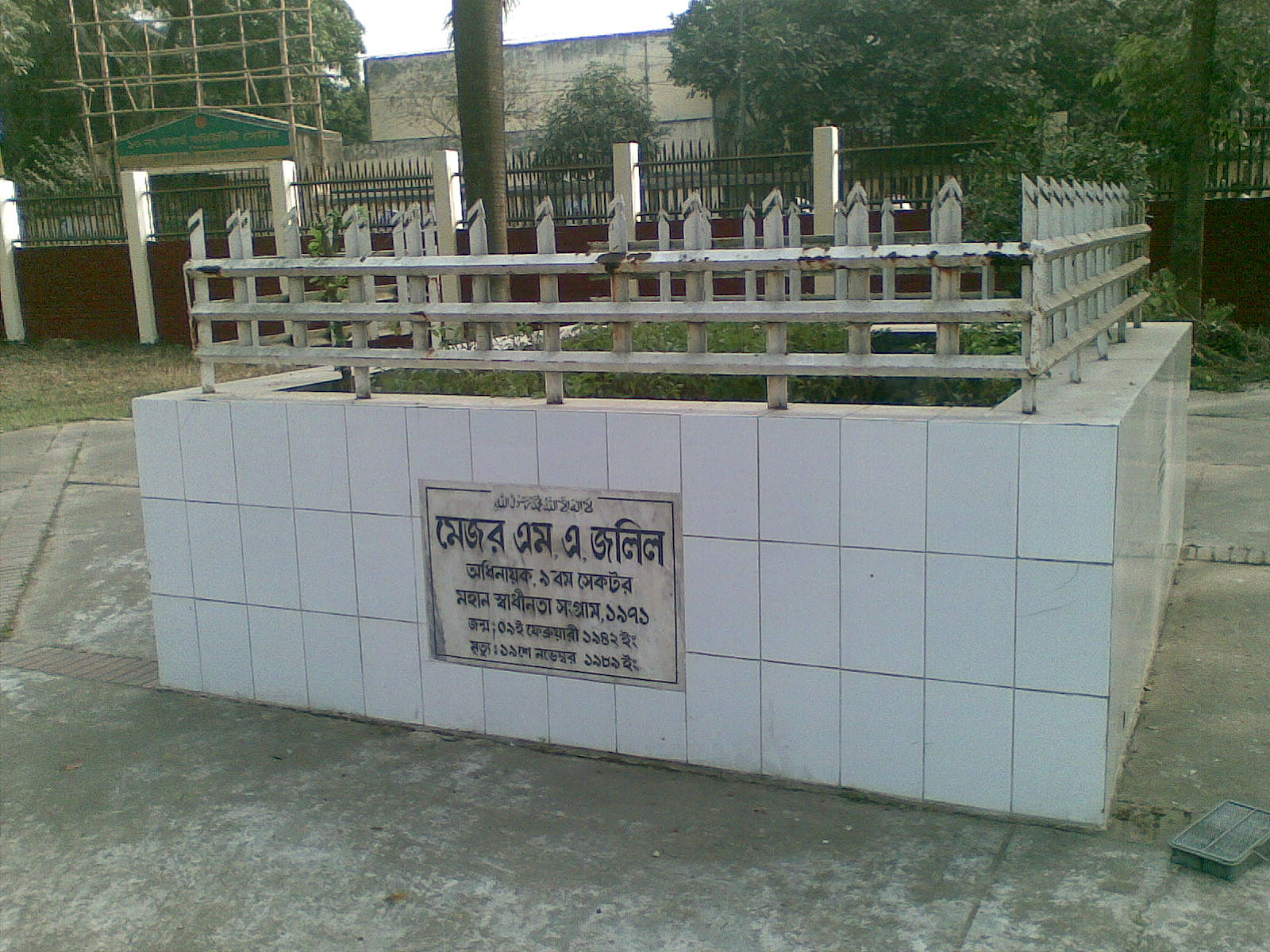
Grave of Major Mohammad Abdul Jalil

== Personal life ==
Abdul Jalil was an observant Sunni Muslim. On 26 October 1984, amidst the ceremonious observance of the nationwide Day of Supplication convened by the Combined Action Committee, and within the precincts of the Baitul Mukarram National Mosque, Abdul Jalil pledged his spiritual allegiance to the Hanafi jurist and politician Muhammadullah Hafezzi in accordance with the mystic Chishti order of Sufism.

== Notable works ==
- Seemahin Samay (1976)
- Dristibhangi O Jiban Darshan
- Surjodoy (1982)
- Arakshita Swadhinatayi Paradhinata (1989)
- Bangladesh Nationalist Movement for Unity: A Historical Necessity

== Death and legacy ==
He died in Islamabad, Pakistan, on 19 November 1989. His body was brought to Dhaka on 22 November 1989 and buried at the Mirpur Graveyard for Intellectuals with full honors. A bridge in Barisal is named after him. He was posthumously awarded Independence Award, the highest civilian honour of Bangladesh in 2026.
