= Islami Andolan Bangladesh =

Far-right political party in Bangladesh

Islami Andolan Bangladesh ইসলামী আন্দোলন বাংলাদেশ
- Abbreviation: IAB
- Ameer: Syed Rezaul Karim
- Secretary-General: Gazi Ataur Rahman
- Founder: Syed Fazlul Karim
- Founded: 13 March 1987 (39 years ago)
- Headquarters: 55/B, Purana Paltan, Dhaka
- Student wing: Islami Chhatra Andolan Bangladesh
- Youth wing: Islami Jubo Andolan Bangladesh
- Women's wing: Women Unit of Islami Andolan Bangladesh
- Trade union: Islami Sromik Andolan Bangladesh
- Ideology: Reactionary Islamism
- Political position: Far-right
- National affiliation: None Former: 11 Party Alliance (2025–26); Islami Jatiya Oikya Front (2001–03)
- Colors: Green (official) Golden (customary)
- Slogan: "Motto of liberation, Islamic governance" (মুক্তির মূলমন্ত্র, ইসলামী শাসনতন্ত্র)
- Bangladesh Parliament: 1 / 350 (Note: Mahmudul Hossain Waliullah from Barguna-1.)

Election symbol
- Hand fan

Party flag

Website
- islamiandolanbd.org

Islami Andolan Bangladesh (Bengali: ইসলামী আন্দোলন বাংলাদেশ, lit. 'Islamic Movement [of] Bangladesh') is a far-right, reactionary Islamist political party in Bangladesh. It was established by Islamic scholar Syed Fazlul Karim, pir of Charmonai, on 13 March 1987 as the Islami Shasontontro Andolon. Syed Rezaul Karim is the incumbent ameer of the party since 2006.

== Position ==
=== Social ===
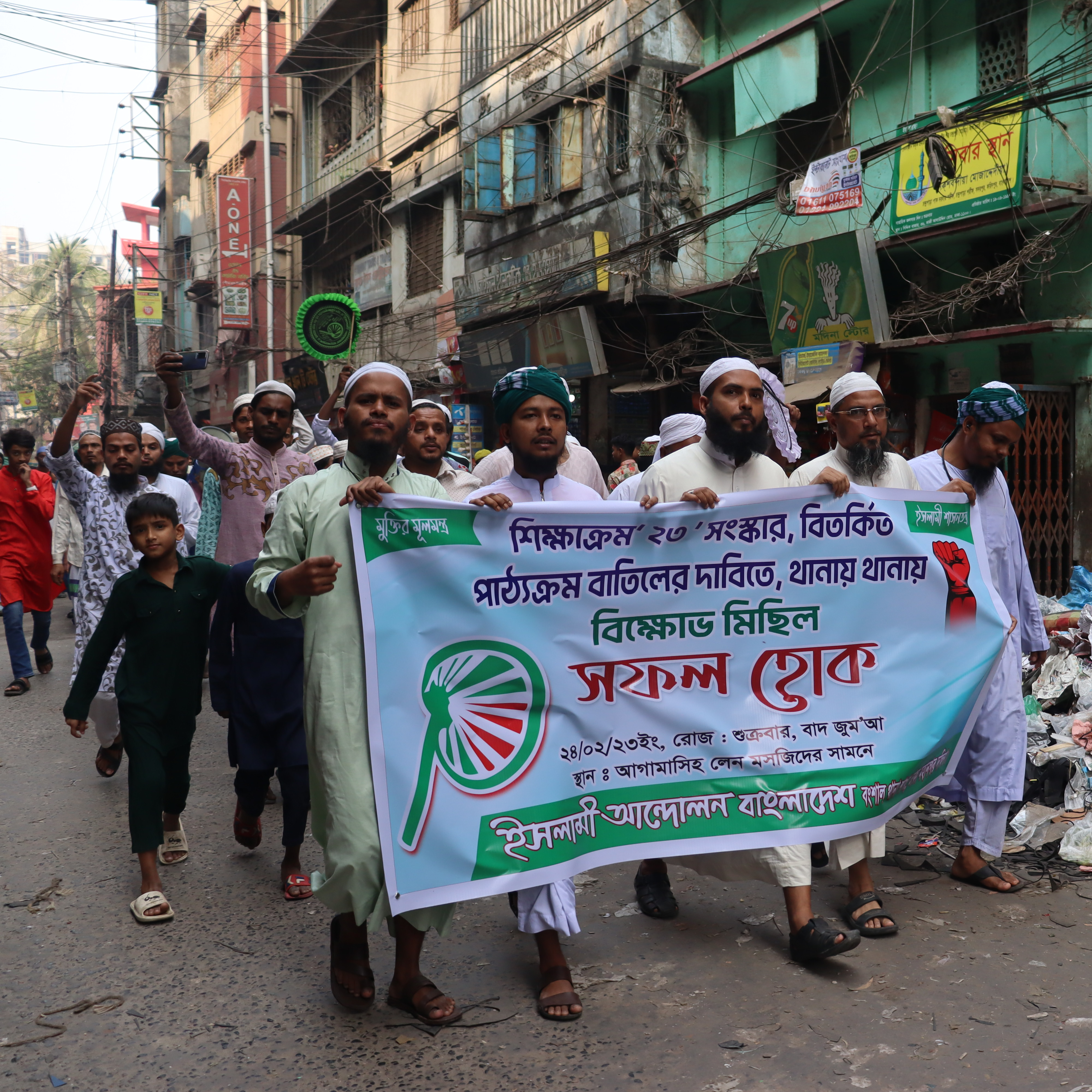
A procession of IAB, 24 February 2023

The party protested against the government of Bangladesh for allowing a women's football tournament in October 2004 and called it "disgrace to women". The party has campaigned in favour of a blasphemy law and organised rallies in support for a restoration of the caretaker government of Bangladesh, as well as demanding punishment of former government minister Abdul Latif Siddiqui for his comments criticizing Hajj and Muhammad. A memorandum has been submitted to the United Nations, urging an end to the violence occurring in Rakhine State, Myanmar. Prior to leaving Baitul Mukarram, party leaders, including Mufti Syed Rezaul Karim, delivered speeches denouncing the atrocities faced by the Rohingya people in Myanmar. In 2019, numerous activists from Islami Andolan Bangladesh assembled at the north gate of Baitul Mukarram National Mosque following Jumah prayers, staging a protest in the vicinity of the mosque against the Citizenship (Amendment) Act (CAA) and the National Register of Citizens (NRC) in India. They raised slogans such as, "No CAB, no NRC, and stop torturing Muslims in India! Where is humanity?"

On April 25, 2017, IAB emanded he arrest of "atheist bloggers who insulted Islam" and the enactment of legislation to penalize those who "insult Islam" in Parliament.

The party has been particularly vocal compared to others during the 2024 Bangladesh textbook tearing controversy, advocating for a boycott of Aarong and BRAC University as part of its anti-transformation protests.

=== Political ===
Islami Andolan Bangladesh highly supports Islamic unity and have proposed for all Islamist parties uniting for Election.

On 19 October 2026, IAB announced its official women unit of the party.

== Election results ==
In the 2018 Bangladesh general elections, the Islami Andolan Bangladesh (IAB) achieved the third highest vote count, following the Awami League-led Grand Alliance and BNP-led Jatiya Oikya Front.

Recent city corporation elections have demonstrated a significant increase in the votes received by IAB candidates. In the 2023 Khulna City Corporation election, the IAB candidate surpassed the Jatiya Party (Ershad), the opposition in parliament at that time, by securing 14,363 votes, while the JaPa candidate received only 1,500 votes. Additionally, IAB ranked third in the 2020 Dhaka South City Corporation election, the 2020 Dhaka North City Corporation election, the 2022 Narayanganj City Corporation election, and the 2022 Rangpur City Corporation election.

=== Jatiya Sangsad elections ===
Election	Party leader	Votes	%	Seats	+/–	Position	Government
1988	Syed Fazlul Karim	Did not participate				—N/a	Extra-parliamentary
1991	Syed Fazlul Karim	Did not participate				—N/a	Extra-parliamentary
Feb 1996	Syed Fazlul Karim	Did not participate				—N/a	Extra-parliamentary
Jun 1996	Syed Fazlul Karim	11,159	0.03%	0 / 300	New	▲19th	Extra-parliamentary
2001	Syed Fazlul Karim	5,944	0.01%	0 / 300	0	▲17th	Extra-parliamentary
2008	Syed Faizul Karim	658,254	0.94%	0 / 300	0	▲5th	Extra-parliamentary
2014	Syed Faizul Karim	Boycotted				—N/a	Extra-parliamentary
2018	Syed Faizul Karim	12,55,373	1.47%	0 / 300	0	▲3rd	Extra-parliamentary
2024	Syed Faizul Karim	Boycotted				—N/a	Extra-parliamentary
2026	Syed Faizul Karim	20,24,140	2.70%	1 / 300	▲1	▼4th	Opposition

== Controversy and criticism ==
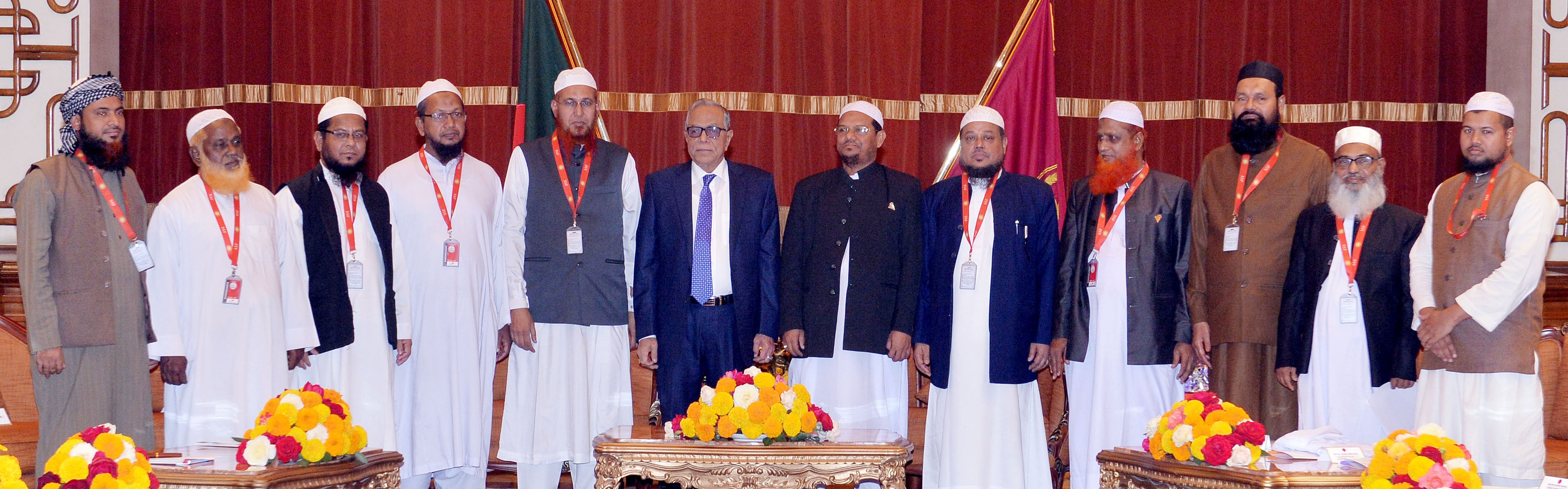
IAB delegation meeting with Bangladeshi president Mohammad Abdul Hamid on 9 January 2017.

Secular Bangladeshi analysts, international observers, and left-wing entities have characterized Islami Andolon Bangladesh (IAB) as a "far-right" organization and a threat to the country's constitutional secularism. Critics allege that the party promotes extremism by openly advocating for Taliban-style Sharia-based governance and the death penalty under blasphemy laws.

These allegations intensified following the 2013 involvement of activists from IAB, its predecessor Islami Oikya Jote (IOJ), and its student wing, Islami Chhatra Khelafat, with Hefazat-e-Islam. This collaboration was prominent during the Shapla Chattar protests and the violence of May 5–6, which resulted in hundreds of injuries and a disputed official death toll of 58 or 27. The demonstrators’ demands included a ban on the free mixing of women in public, the halting of secular education reforms, and the punishment of "atheist bloggers."

The party, led by Syed Fazlul Karim, faces accusations of facilitating the radicalization of youth through madrasas and student organizations by prioritizing Quranic education over modern curricula, thereby isolating students from pluralistic values. Furthermore, observers allege that the party has directed protests against Western influence and the Hindu community toward anti-minority extremism. While a Carnegie Endowment analysis noted the party's third-place finish in the 2018 general election, the post-2024 political landscape saw Secretary General Maulana Yunus Ahmad emphasize a "single ballot box" strategy to consolidate votes with parties such as Jamaat-e-Islami. On October 17, 2025, party activists clashed with police near the National Parliament during protests against the interim government, claiming that electoral reforms and the post-Hasina transition aligned with the charter of the July Revolution were not sufficiently Islamic.

Additionally, the party has been condemned by the U.S. Commission on International Religious Freedom (USCIRF) and human rights groups for displaying religious conservatism and extremist ideologies that challenge gender norms. Incidents cited include the 2020 anti-French cartoon rallies, the June 2025 submission of a 16-point reform charter prioritizing Islamic law over democratic secularism, and the February 2025 forced cancellation of a women's football match, which the party labeled "anti-Islamic" and incompatible with modesty.

== See also ==
- List of Islamic political parties
- List of Deobandi organisations
