= Growth centre =

Rural economic hub in Bangladesh

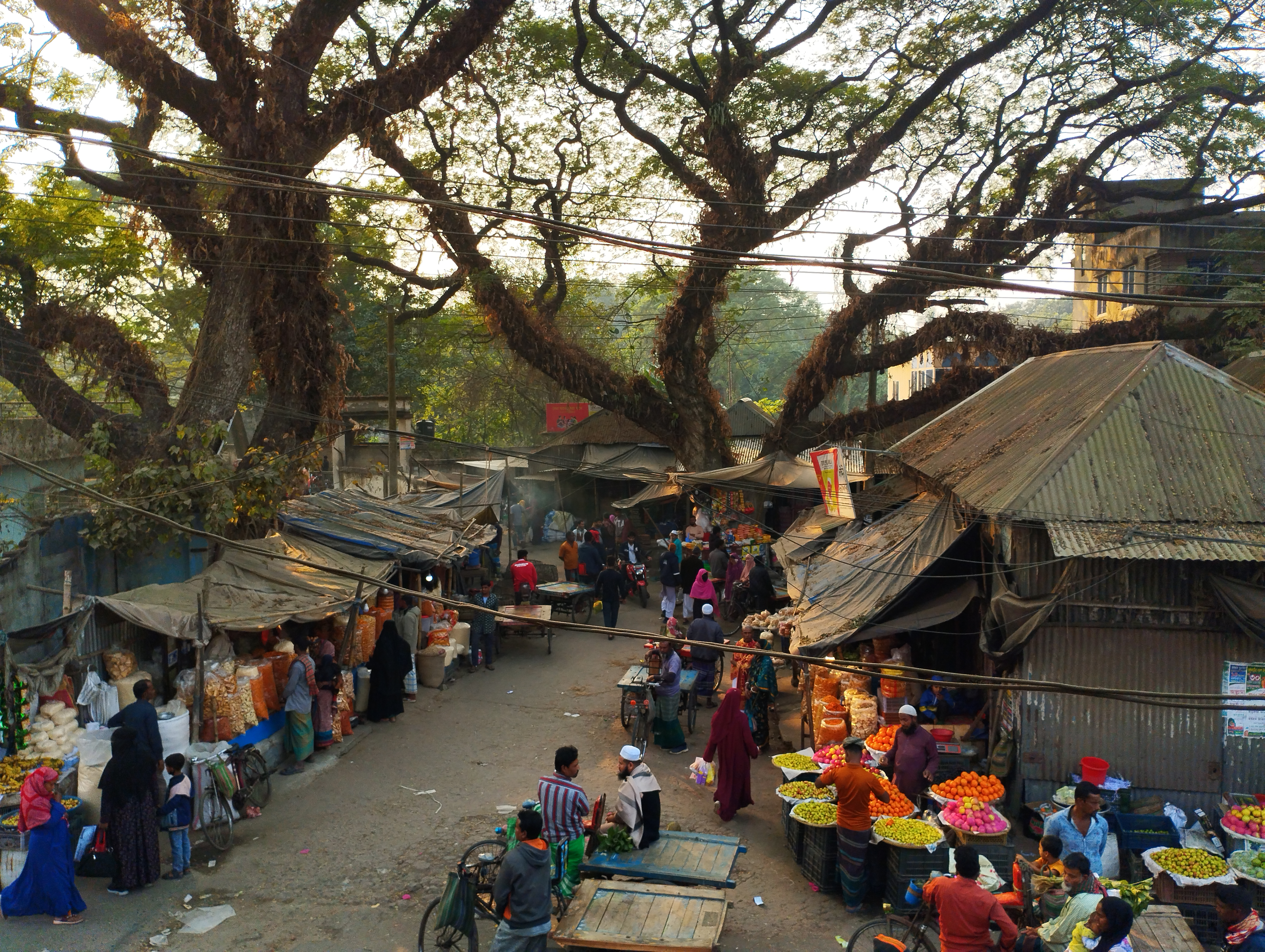
Kanaipur Bazar, a suburb of Faridpur, an example of a growth center

Growth centre or development centre or prosperity centre is the main hub of rural economic development in Bangladesh, through which investment in the rural economy increases and employment is generated. In 2000, a report titled The Role of Growth centres in the Rural Economy of Bangladesh was published by Bangladesh University of Engineering and Technology, which stated that in the context of Bangladesh, infrastructural elements that greatly influence the rural economy are the growth centers or prosperity centers. These are considered as urban areas or urban localities in Bangladesh.

== Projects ==
In 1984, a policy was formulated for the Ministry of Local Government, Rural Development and Cooperatives, which emphasized rural infrastructure development along with agricultural irrigation, flood control, and employment generation, and also mentioned the development of infrastructure based on growth centers. In 1996, regarding the effectiveness of the National Rural Development Policy, a joint survey was conducted by the World Bank and the Government of Bangladesh. This survey highlighted the need for road infrastructure development based on growth centers.
