= Syed Fazlul Karim =

Bangladeshi Islamic scholar

Amir-ul-Mujahidin, Mawlana Muhammad Fazlul Karim
- Title: Pir Saheb Charmonai

Personal life
- Born: Fazlul Karim; 1935 Charmonai, Barisal, Bengal Province
- Died: 25 November 2006 (aged 70–71) Charmonai, Barisal, Bangladesh
- Children: Syed Rezaul Karim; Syed Faizul Karim
- Parent: Syed Muhammad Ishaq
- Political party: Islami Andolan Bangladesh
- Main interest(s): Sufism, political Islam
- Occupation: Politician, teacher

Religious life
- Religion: Islam
- Denomination: Sunni
- Jurisprudence: Hanafi
- Movement: Deobandi

Syed Fazlul Karim (Bengali: সৈয়দ ফজলুল করিম; 1935 – 25 November 2006) was an Islamic scholar and politician. He was the founder of Islami Andolan Bangladesh, and founded a residential madrassah in Charmonai, Barisal, southern Bangladesh.

== Early life and education ==
Syed Muhammad Fazlul Karim was born in 1935, in the village of Charmonai in Barisal, Bengal Province. He belonged to a Bengali Muslim family who were the hereditary Pirs of Charmonai, with his grandfather, Sayed Amjad Ali. His father, Syed Muhammad Ishaq, was the first Pir of Charmonai. Karim began studying with his father at an early age, later joining his father's madrasa in Charmonai. After completing his degree in Islamic studies from alia madrasah, he joined Jamia Qurania Arabia Lalbagh, Dhaka. He completed Dawra e Hadith from this institution in 1957.

== Career ==
Karim started his career as a teacher at Charmonai Madrasah. In 1987, he established Islami Shashontantra Andolan. He served as the head of the movement until his death in 2006.

== Death ==
After long suffering from diabetes and kidney disease, Fazlul Karim died at the age of 71 in his own home at village Charmonai in Sadar upazila of Barisal district on 25 November 2006. He had two wives, seven sons and a daughter.
