= Wazirpur Upazila =

Ujirpur উজিরপুর
- Upazila
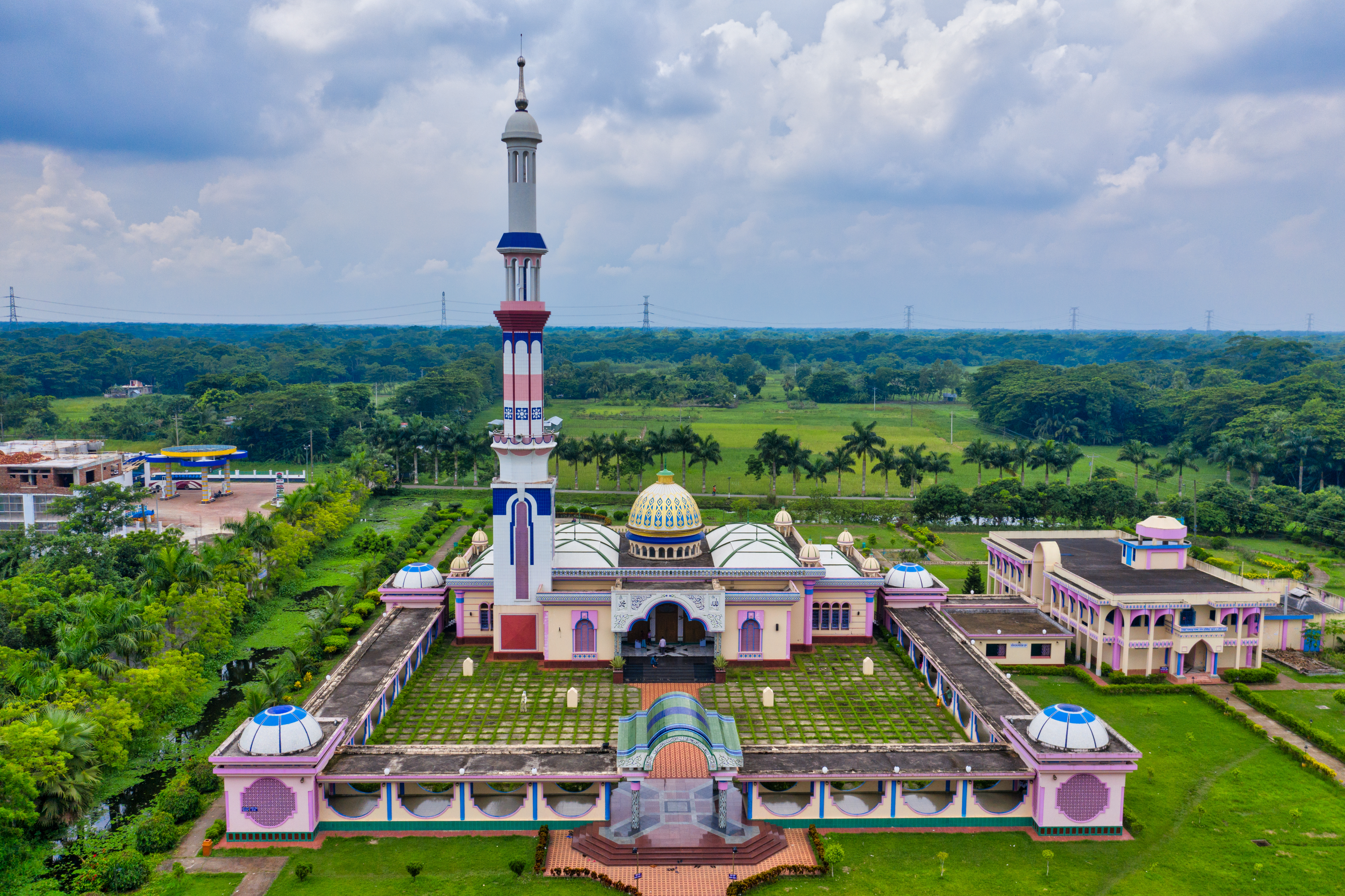
- Baitul Aman Mosque in Guthia

- Coordinates: 22°48.7′N 90°14.7′E
- Country: Bangladesh
- Division: Barisal Division
- District: Barisal District
- Headquarter: Wazirpur

Area
  - Total: 248.35 km^{2} (95.89 sq mi)

Population (2022)
  - Total: 254,506
  - Density: 1,024.8/km^{2} (2,654.2/sq mi)
- Time zone: UTC+6 (BST)
- Postal code: 8220
- Website: Official Map of the Wazirpur Upazila

Wazirpur (Bengali: উজিরপুর), officially known as Ujirpur, is an upazila of Barisal District in Barisal Division, Bangladesh.

== Etymology ==
The toponymic origin of Wazirpur, literally translating to “City of the Vizier”, has been attributed by some to Wazir Sayyid Ulfat Ghazi, whose prominence in the Mughal conquest of Bakla in 1611 may have lent the area its name; however, this interpretation remains contested, with alternative etymologies proposed by others.

== Geography ==
Wazirpur is located at 22.8111°N 90.2444°E. It has a total area of 248.35 km^{2}.

== Demographics ==
According to the 2022 Bangladeshi census, Ujirpur Upazila had 61,889 households and a population of 254,506. 8.61% of the population were under 5 years of age. Ujirpur had a literacy rate (age 7 and over) of 79.84%: 81.93% for males and 77.88% for females, and a sex ratio of 95.18 males for every 100 females. 43,366 (17.04%) lived in urban areas.

Religions in Ujirpur Upazila (2022)
Religion	Percent
Islam	75.75%
Hinduism	23.46%
Christianity	0.78%
Other or not stated	0.01%

Population by religion in Union/Paurashava
Union/Paurashava	Muslim	Hindu	Others
Ujirpur Paurashava	13,794	3,645	5
Bamrail Union	29,858	1,574	591
Barakotha Union	29,662	1,876	1
Guthia Union	24,753	1,848	35
Harta Union	6,002	17,931	9
Jalla Union	6,974	16,074	403
Otra Union	21,599	3,114	21
Satla Union	19,378	7,765	767
Shikarpur Union	15,596	1,315	192
Sholak Union	25,158	4,563	3

🟩 Muslim majority 🟧 Hindu majority

According to the 2011 Census of Bangladesh, Wazirpur Upazila had 52,959 households and a population of 234,959. 51,236 (21.81%) were under 10 years of age. Wazirpur had a literacy rate (age 7 and over) of 62.50%, compared to the national average of 51.8%, and a sex ratio of 1,070 females per 1,000 males. 11,716 (4.99%) lived in urban areas.

According to the 1991 Bangladesh census, Wazirpur had a population of 227,115. Males constituted 50.8% of the population, and females 49.2%. The number of residents aged 18 or over was 114,254. Wazirpur has an average literacy rate of 47.7% (7+ years), compared to the national average of 32.4%. There are 22 colleges and 50 primary schools in Wazirpur.

== Administration ==
UNO: Md. Shakhawat Hossain.

Wazirpur Upazila is divided into nine union parishads: Shikerpur, Bamrail, Barakotha, Guthia, Harta, Jalla, Otra, Satla, and Sholak. The union parishads are subdivided into 118 mauzas and 125 villages.

== Notable residents ==
- Major M. A. Jalil, officer and politician
- Sardar Fazlul Karim, philosopher
- Manabendra Mukherjee (singer)

== See also ==
- Upazilas of Bangladesh
- Districts of Bangladesh
- Divisions of Bangladesh
- Administrative geography of Bangladesh
