= Board of Intermediate and Secondary Education, Jashore =

Education board in Bangladesh

Board of Intermediate & Secondary Education, Jashore
- মাধ্যমিক ও উচ্চ মাধ্যমিক শিক্ষা বোর্ড,যশোর
- Formation: 1963; 63 years ago
- Location: Jashore, Bangladesh
- Coordinates: 23.1765°N 89.2168°E
- Official language: Bengali, English
- Chairman: Professor Faruque Azam Md. Abdus Salam
- Secretary: Professor Dr. Md. Abdul Matin
- Controller of Examinations: Professor S. M. Hossain Ali
- Parent organization: Ministry of Education, Bangladesh Government
- Staff: 35
- Website: www.jessoreboard.gov.bd
- Formerly called: Board of Intermediate & Secondary Education, Jessore (1963-2019)

The Board of Intermediate and Secondary Education, Jashore is an autonomous organization in Jashore, Bangladesh, mainly responsible for holding two public examinations (SSC & HSC) and for providing recognition to the newly established non-government educational institutions.

Another function of the Board is to sanction scholarship as per official. Besides, educational activities the Board also conducts the extension of co-curricular aspects, such as development of sports, and boy scout and girls guide programs.

== District under Jashore Education Board ==
- Bagerhat District
- Chuadanga District
- Jessore District
- Jhenaidah District
- Khulna District
- Kushtia District
- Magura District
- Meherpur District
- Narail District
- Satkhira District

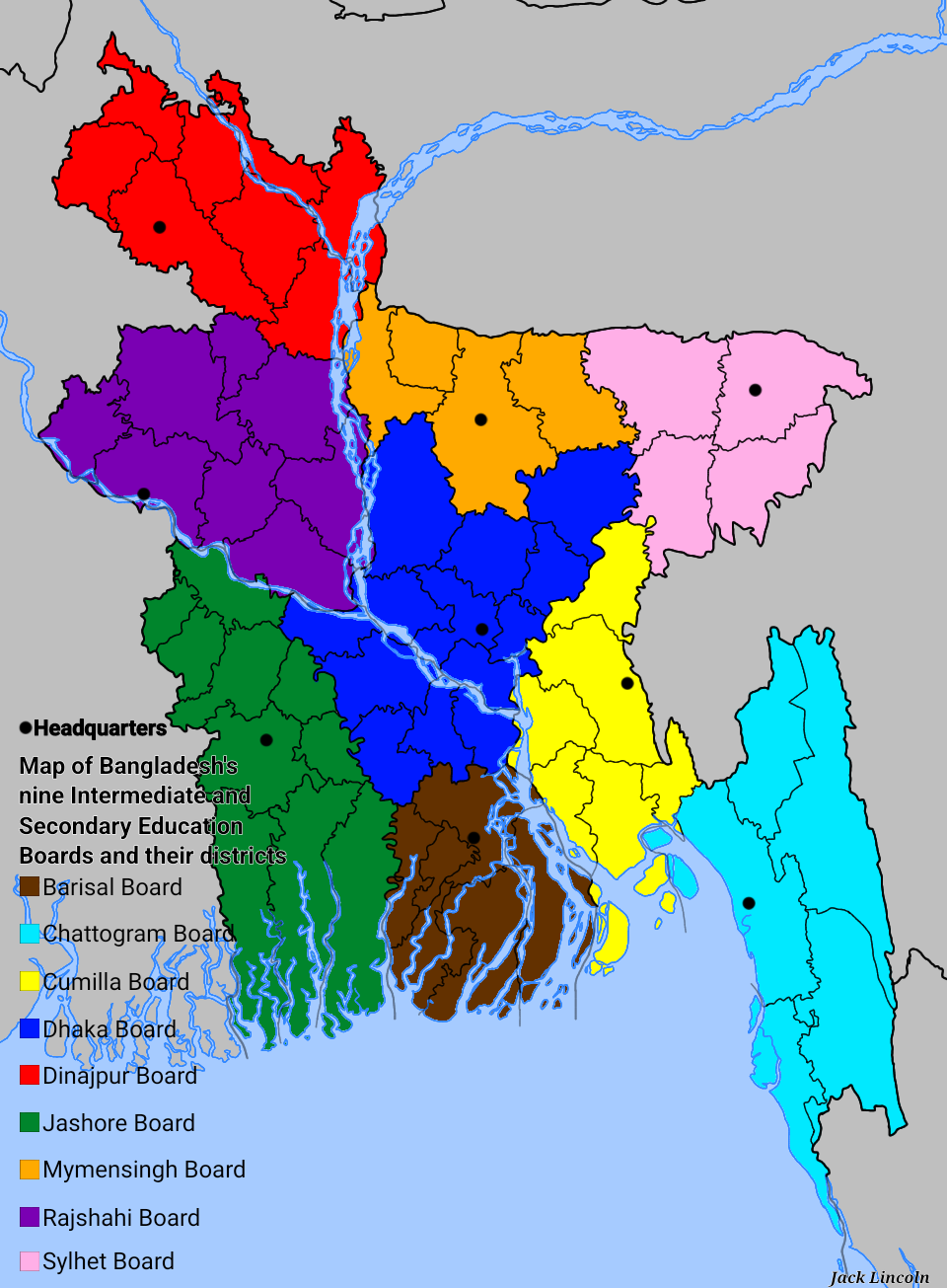
Map of Bangladesh's nine Intermediate and Secondary Education Boards and their districts

== Notable institutions ==
=== Jashore colleges ===
- Cantonment College, Jashore
- Michael Madhusudan College
- Jashore Government City College
- Govt. Keshabpur College
- Manirampur Govt. College

=== Jashore schools ===
- Jashore Zilla School
- Border Guard Public School, Jessore
- Akij Collegiate School, Jhikargachha Upazila
- Daud Public School and College
- Manirampur Government High School
- Keshabpur Govt. Pilot Higher Secondary School
- Sagardari Michael Madhusadan Institution
- Panjia High School

=== Khulna colleges ===
- Khulna Public College
- Brajalal College
- Govt. Sundarban Adarsha College, Khulna
- Khulna Govt. Girls College
- Government Majid Memorial City College
- Daulatpur Day night College
- Azam Khan Government Commerce College
- Govt. Bangabandhu College, Rupsha, Khulna

=== Khulna schools ===
- Khulna Zilla School
- Navy Anchorage School and College Khulna
- Bangladesh Navy School and College, Khulna
- Govt. Daulatpur Muhsin High School
- St. Joseph's High School, Khulna

=== Chuadanga schools ===
- Victoria Jubilee Government High School, Chuadanga

=== Meherpur schools ===
- Meherpur Govt. High School

=== Jhenidah schools ===
- Jhenidah Govt High School, Jhenidah bn:ঝিনাইদহ সরকারি উচ্চ বিদ্যালয়
- Jhenidah Govt Girls High School, Jhenidah

=== Jhenidah College ===
- Jhenidah Cadet College, Jhenidah
- Jhenidah Govt K.C College, Jhenidah

== See also ==
- List of Intermediate and Secondary Education Boards in Bangladesh
