= List of educational institutions in Khulna District =

A list of universities, colleges and schools in Khulna, Bangladesh:

== Universities ==
=== Public ===
- Khulna University, Gollamari, Khulna
- Khulna University of Engineering and Technology, Fulbari Gate, Khulna
- Khulna Agricultural University, Daulatpur, Khulna
- Khulna Medical University, Nirala, Khulna

=== Private ===
- Bangladesh Army University of Science and Technology Khulna, Shiromoni, Khulna
- North Western University, Labanchara, Khulna
- Northern University of Business and Technology Khulna, Mostofar More, Khulna
- Khan Bahadur Ahsanullah University, Khulna

== Medical colleges ==
=== Public ===
- Khulna Medical College, Choto Boyra, Khulna
- Khulna Nursing College, Choto Boyra, Khulna

=== Private ===
- Ad-Din Akij Medical College, Boikali, Khulna
- Khulna City Medical College, Moylapota, Khulna
- Khulna Homoeopathic Medical College, Moylapota, Khulna
- Gazi Medical College, Sonadanga, Khulna
- Khulna Mamota Nursing College, Fulbari Gate, Khulna

== Colleges ==
=== Public ===
- Govt. B.L. College (HSC, Honors, Masters), Daulatpur, Khulna
- Azam Khan Govt. Commerce College (HSC, Honors, Masters), Babu Khan Road
- Khulna Govt. Girls College (Honors, Masters), Boyra, Khulna
- Govt. Pioneer Girls' College, Khulna
- Govt. M.M. City College, Khulna
- Khulna Govt. Model School And College, Boyra Khulna
- Khulna Government College, Sonadanga, Khulna
- Govt. Sundarban Adarsha College, Khulna
- Govt. Bangabandhu College, Rupsha, Khulna
- Govt. Haji Mohammad Mohasin College (Honours), Khalishpur, Khulna

=== Private ===
- Khulna Public College, Boyra, Khulna
- KDA school and College, KDA Approach Rd,Khulna
- Bangladesh Navy School & College, Goalkhali, Khulna
- Khulna Collegiate Girls' School & College, Rupsha, Khulna
- Islamia Degree College, Boyra, Khulna
- Khulna College, Sheikhpara, Khulna
- Daulatpur College (Day/Night), Daulatpur, Khulna
- Ahsanullah College (Honours), Moylapota, Khulna
- Shaheed Sohrawardy College, Banorgati, Khulna
- Saburunessa Girls' College, Gagan Babu Road, Khulna
- Sarowar Khan Degree College, Senhati, Khulna
- Rayermohal Degree College, Rayarmohol, Khulna
- Khan Jahan Ali Ideal College, Shiromoni, Khulna
- Metropolitan College, Khulna, Sonadanga Khulna

== Government schools ==
- Khulna Zilla School
- Govt. Coronation Secondary Girls' School
- Govt. Laboratory High School
- Khulna Govt. Girls' High School, Boyra, Khulna
- Govt. Daulatpur Muhsin High School
- Govt. Iqbal Nagar Girls' High School
- Govt. Model High School
- K.D.A. Khan Jahan Ali Govt. High School
- Deldar Ahmed Govt. High School, Khulna
- Salauddin Yusuf Govt High School, Khulna
- Khulna Govt. Model School and College
- Khulna Power Station High school, Khalispur, Khulna

== Non government schools ==
- Military Collegiate School Khulna, Fultala, Khulna
- Khulna Public College, Boyra
- PMG High School, Boyra
- St. Joseph's High School, Khulna
- Khulna Collegiate Girls' School
- Islamabad Collegiate School
- Need School, Sonadanga, Khulna (Near Gollamari CSS School)
- Lions School, Khulna,
- SOS Herman miner school,
- Rotary High School
- Bangladesh Navy School and College, Khulna
- Port Secondary School, Khulna
- Sristy Central School & College, Khulna
- Bangabashi high school Khalishpur khulna
- National high school Khalishpur khulna
- Crescent Secondary high school Khalishpur khulna
- Navy Anchorage School and College Khulna
- Teligati High School Khulna
- S S R School, Khulna

== Madrasah ==
- Khulna Alia Kamil Madrasah
- Khulna Nesaria Kamil Madrasah
- Darul Quran Siddiquia Kamil Madrasah
- Shahid Sheikh Abu Naser Dakhil Madrasah
- Darul Ulum Mosque and Madrasa

== IGV schools ==
- UCEP-K C C School, Rupsha
- UCEP-Sonadanga School, Sonadanga
- UCEP-M A Majid School, Fulbarigate
- UCEP-Khalishpur School, Khalishpur
- UCEP-Zohra Samad School, Tootpara
- UCEP-Wazed Ali School, Banorgati

== Technical schools ==
- Technical Training Center Khulna, Fulbarigate, Khulna
- Khulna Shipyard Technical Training Center, Shipyard Main Road, Rupsha, Khulna
- Dumuria Govt. Technical School and College
- UCEP-Mohsin Khulna Technical School, 7, Junction Road, Baikali, Khulna

== English medium schools ==
- Rosedale International English School
- South Herald English Medium School
- Morning Bell English Medium School
- Tulip English School
- Sunflower Tutorial
- Elizabeth Primary School
- Military Collegiate School Khulna
- Islamabad Collegiate School Khulna
- Jahan International School

== Art colleges ==
- Khulna Art College (Now known as School of Fine Arts, Khulna University)

== Polytechnic institutions ==
- Sundarban Institute of Technology, Boyra, Khulna
- Khulna Polytechnic Institute, Khulna
- Hazrat Shahjalal Polytechnic Institute, Khulna
- Khanjahan Ali College Of Science And Technology, Khulna
- Khulna Technical And Engineering College, Khulna
- Khulna Mohila Polytechnic Institute, Khulna
- Mangrove Institute Of Science And Technology, Khulna
- North South Polytechnic Institute, Khulna
- City Polytechnic Institute, Khulna
- Hope Polytechnic Institute, Gollamari, Khulna
- Squire Polytechnic Institute, Khulna
- Squire Medical Institute, Khulna
- PSTI(Public Science & Technology Institute) Polytechnic Institute, Khulna

== Military schools ==
- Military Collegiate School Khulna, Patherbazar, Phooltala, Khulna.

== See also ==
- List of educational institutions in Barisal
- List of educational institutions in Sylhet
