= Barisal (disambiguation) =

Barisal is a major city in Bangladesh. It may also refer to:

== Places and administrative divisions ==
- Barisal Division, a first-level administrative division of Bangladesh
  - Barisal District, a district within Barisal Division
    - Barisal Sadar Upazila, an upazila of Barisal District
- Port of Barisal, the second largest and busiest river port in Bangladesh

== Organizations and infrastructure ==
- Barishal City Corporation, the local government body responsible for the city
- Barisal Airport, a domestic airport in Bangladesh
- Barisal Metropolitan Police, Metropolitan police unit in Bangladesh
- Board of Intermediate and Secondary Education, Barisal
- Barisal Divisional Museum, museum in Bangladesh

== Educational institutions ==
- University of Barisal, public university located in Barisal, Bangladesh
- Barisal Medical College, medical school in Barisal, Bangladesh
- Barishal Engineering College
- Barishal Textile Engineering College, textile engineering college in Bangladesh
- Government Barisal College, educational institute of Barishal, Bangladesh
- Barisal Government Women's College, Bangladeshi college for women
- Barishal Cadet College, military high school in Bangladesh
- Barisal Polytechnic Institute, institute in Barisal, Bangladesh
- Barisal Zilla School, boys' school in Bangladesh
- Barisal Government Girls' High School, government sponsored school in Barisal, Bangladesh

== Sports and entertainment ==
- Barisal Bulls, a former Bangladesh Premier League (BPL) cricket franchise
- Fortune Barishal, a current Bangladesh Premier League (BPL) cricket franchise
- Barisal Division cricket team, a first-class cricket team in Bangladesh
- Barisal Divisional Stadium, sports stadium

== Other uses ==
- Operation Barisal, naval operation in East Pakistan
- Barisal Guns
- Barisal Express, a proposed international train between Bangladesh and India
