= List of educational institutions in Barisal District =

The following is a list of major educational institutions located in the city of Barisal in Bangladesh.

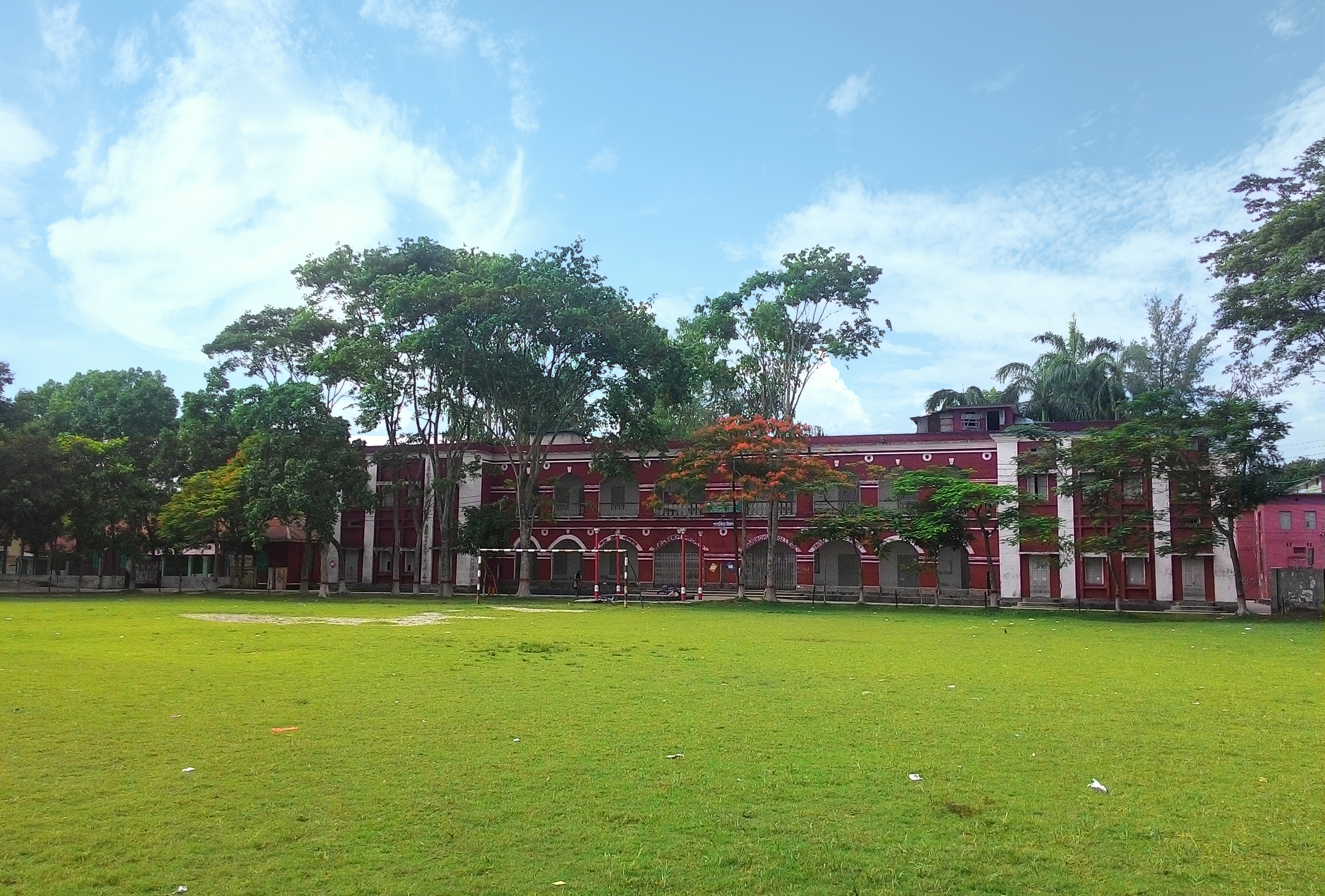
Govt. BM College Main building (Est. 1889)

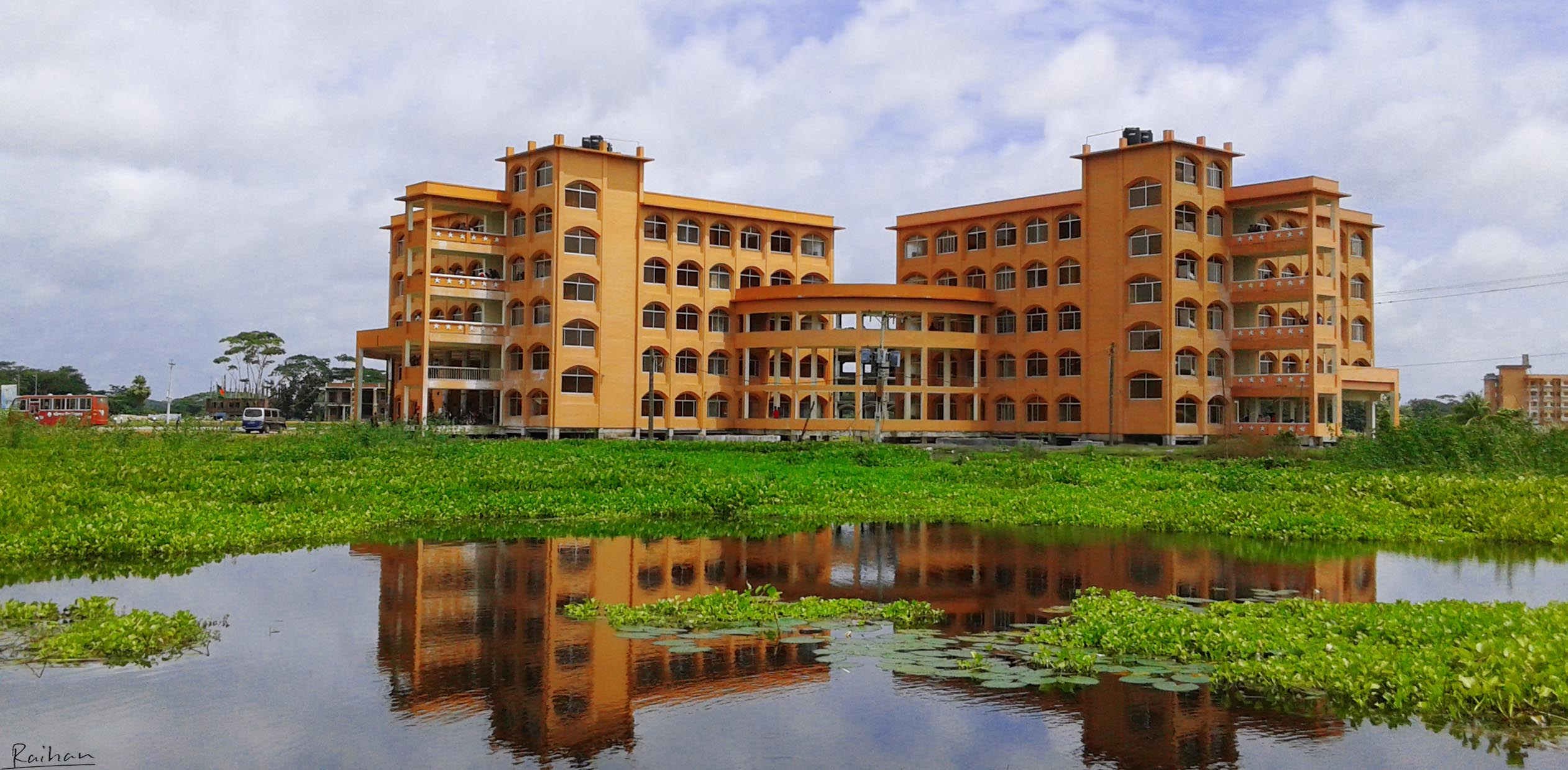
Barisal University Campus (Est. 2011)

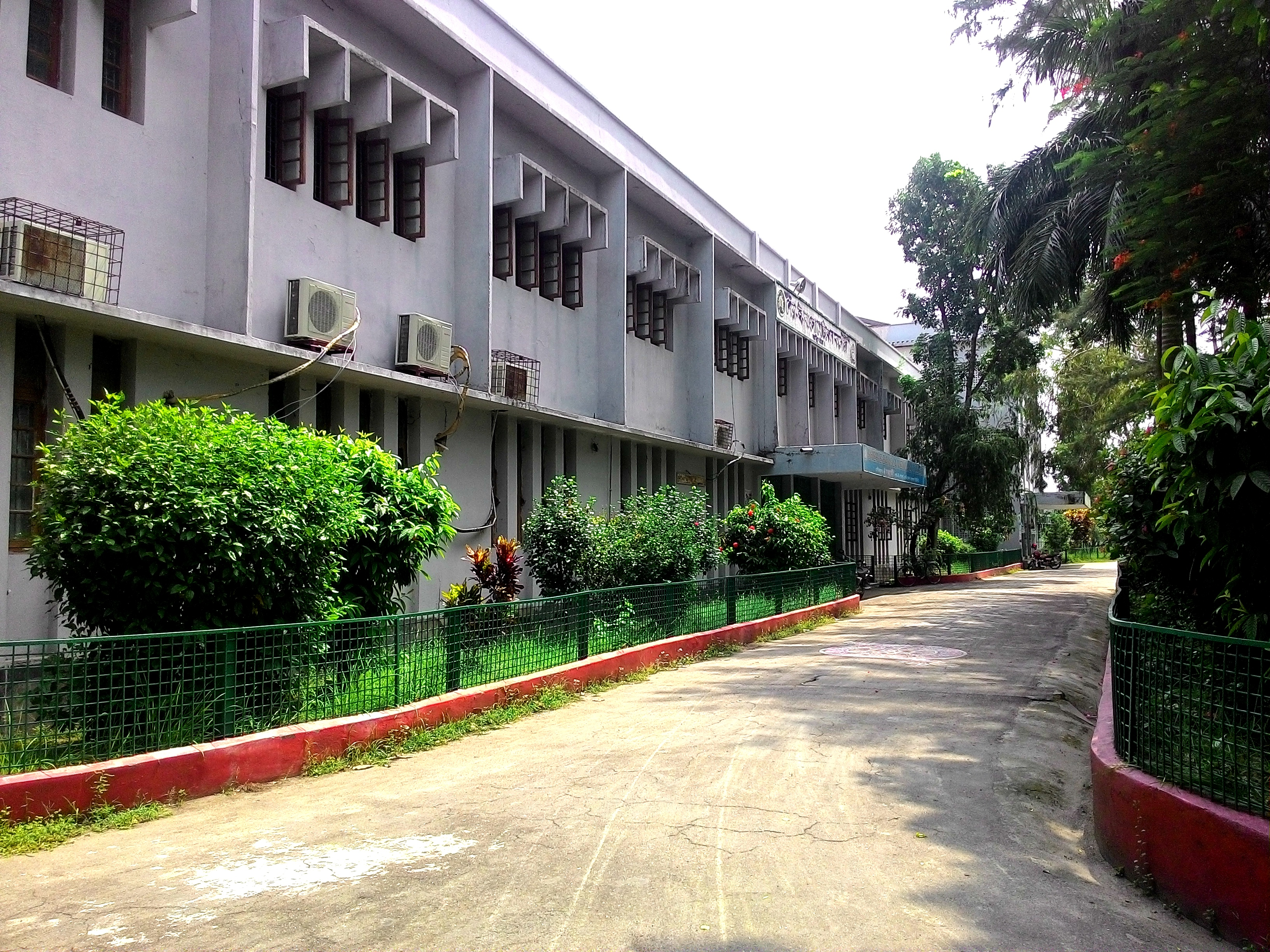
Sher-e-Bangla Medical college (Est. 1968)

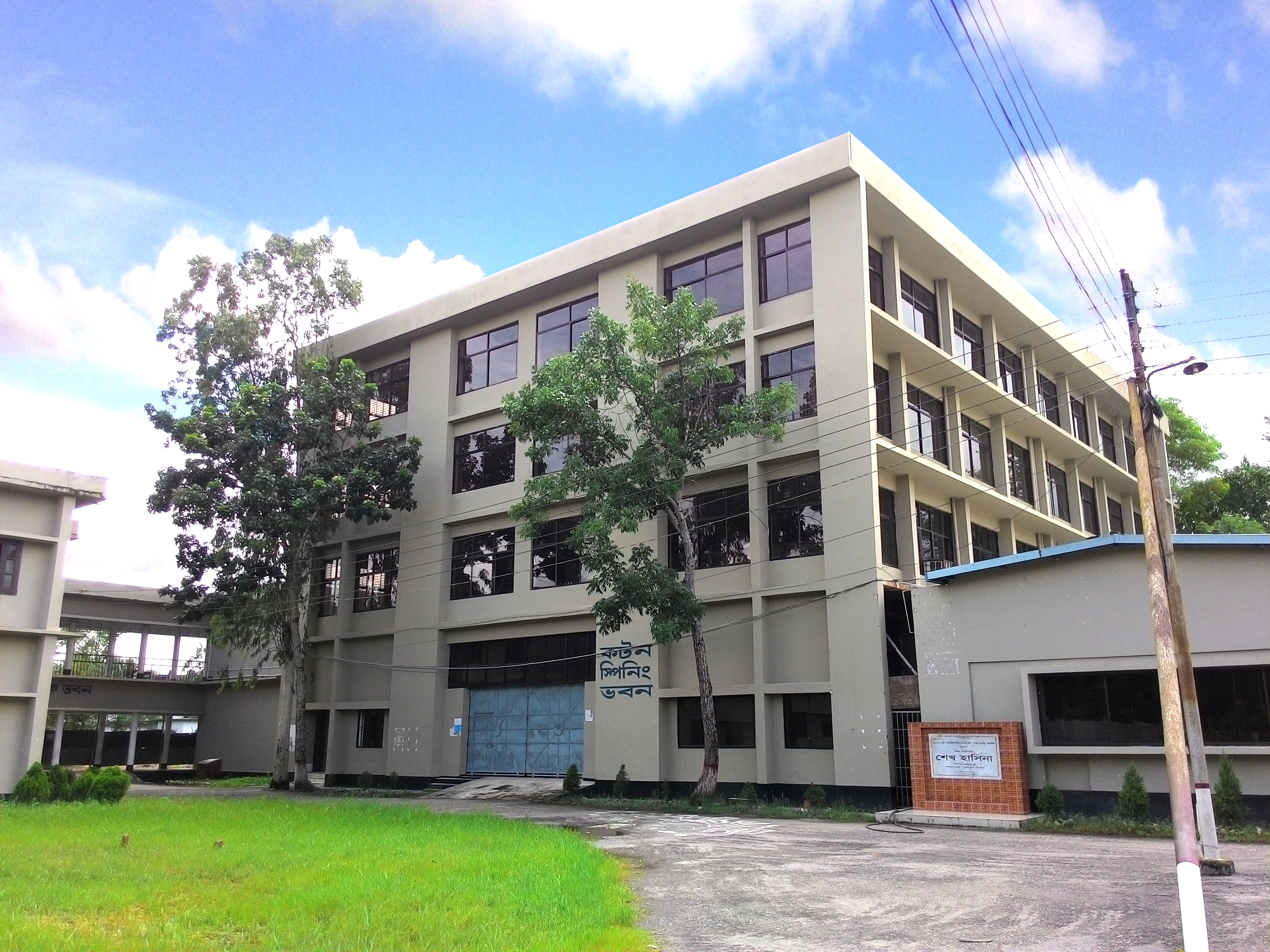
Shaheed Abdur Rab Serniabat Textile Engineering College, Cotton Spinning Shed

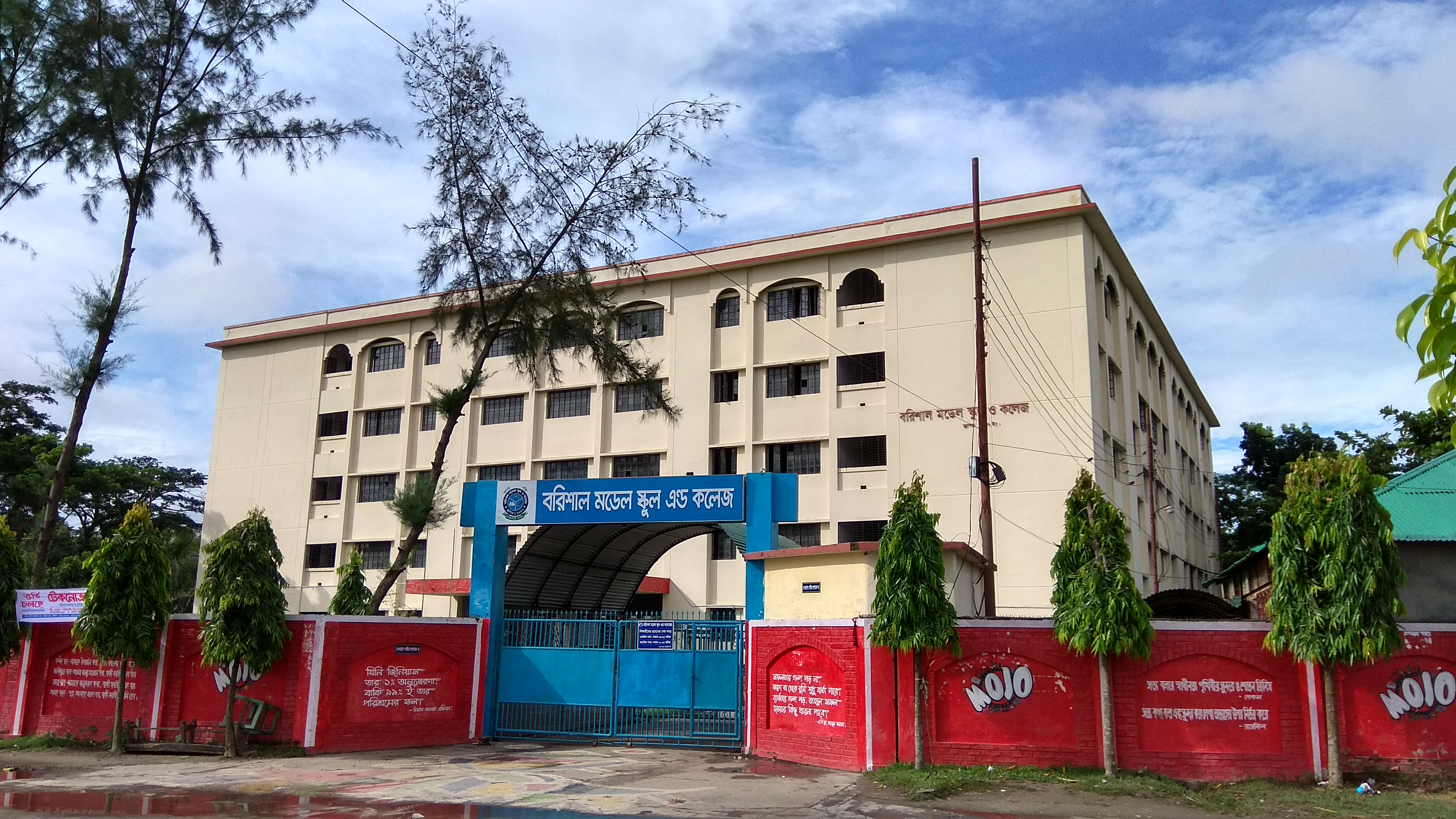
Entrance of Barishal Govt Model School And College

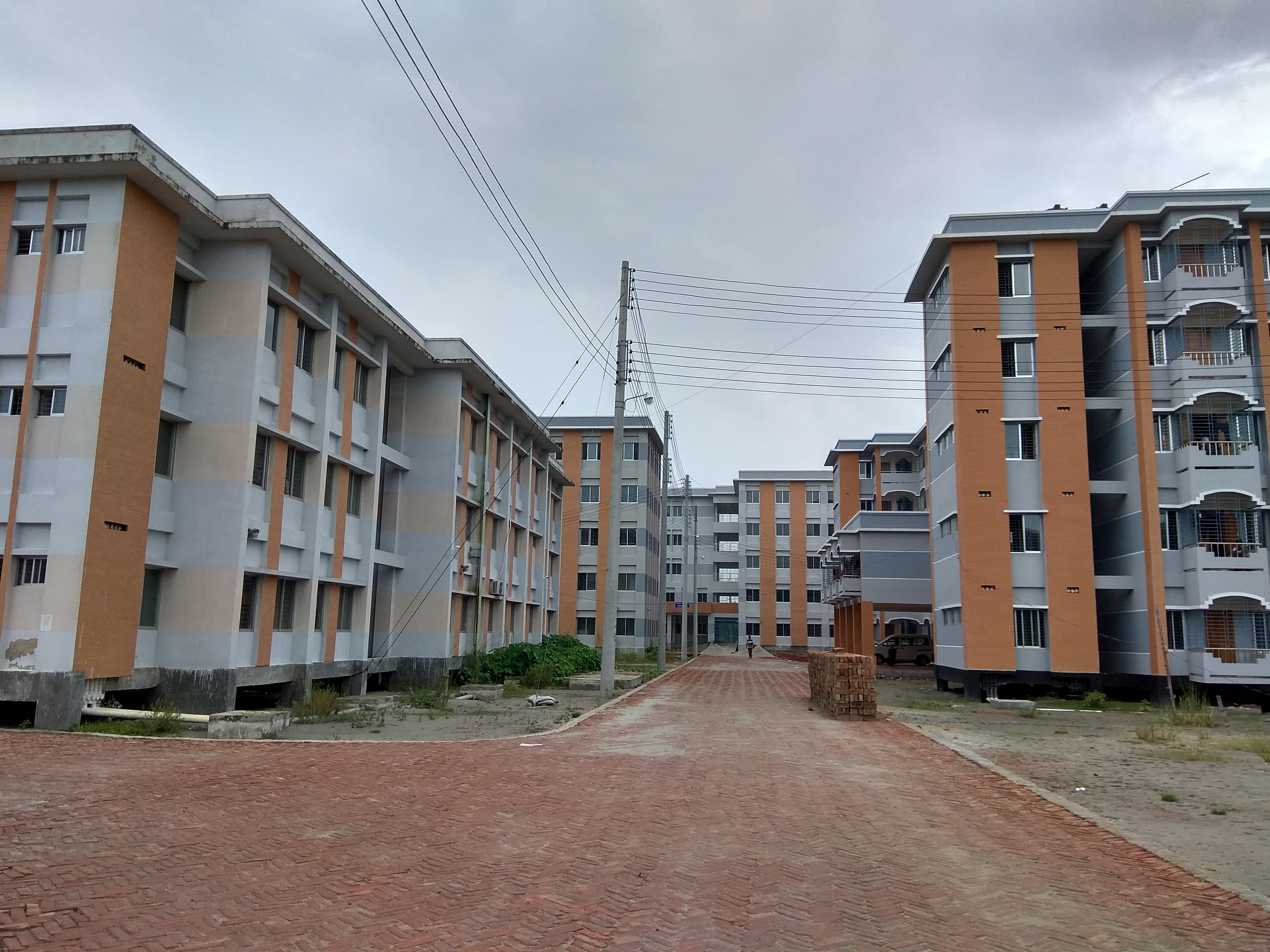
Barisal Engineering College, Bangladesh

== Universities ==
- University of Barisal (public)
- Global University Bangladesh (private)
- University of Global Village (private)
- Trust University, Barishal (private)

== Colleges ==
- Brojomohun College
- Govt. Fazlul Huq College, Chakhar
- Government Syed Hatem Ali College
- Amrita Lal Dey College
- Barishal Government Women's College
- Government Barishal College
- Begum Tofazzal Hossain Manik Mia Mohila College
- Barishal Islamia College
- Barishal Law College
- Rupatoli Jagua College
- Barishal Home Economics College

== Medical colleges ==
- Sher-e-Bangla Medical College
- Sher-e-Bangla Medical College Dental Unit
- Apex Homeopathic Medical College
- Barisal Nursing College
- Institute of Health Technology, Barisal

== Engineering colleges ==
- Shaheed Abdur Rab Serniabat Textile Engineering College
- Barisal Engineering College
- Shaheed Abdur Rab Serniabat Textile Institute, Gournadi

== Polytechnic institutes ==
- Barisal Polytechnic Institute
- Infra Polytechnic Institute, Barisal
- Barishal Information Technology College
- Ideal Polytechnic Institute
- United Polytechnic Institute

== Higher secondary schools ==
- Brojomohun College
- Barisal Government Women's College
- Government Syed Hatem Ali College
- Barisal Cadet College
- Government Barisal College
- Amrita Lal Dey College
- Barishal Government Model School And College
- Alekanda Government College
- Shahid Abdur Rab Serniabat College, Kawnia
- Jagadish Saraswat Girls School & College
- A Karim Ideal College, Palashpur
- Barisal Metropolitan College
- Barisal City College (Day & Night)
- Royal Central College
- Rupatoli Jagua College
- Kashipur High School and College
- Kashipur Girls High School and College
- Mahanagar Day & Night College
- Barishal Commerce College
- Jahanara Israil School & College (English version)

== High schools ==
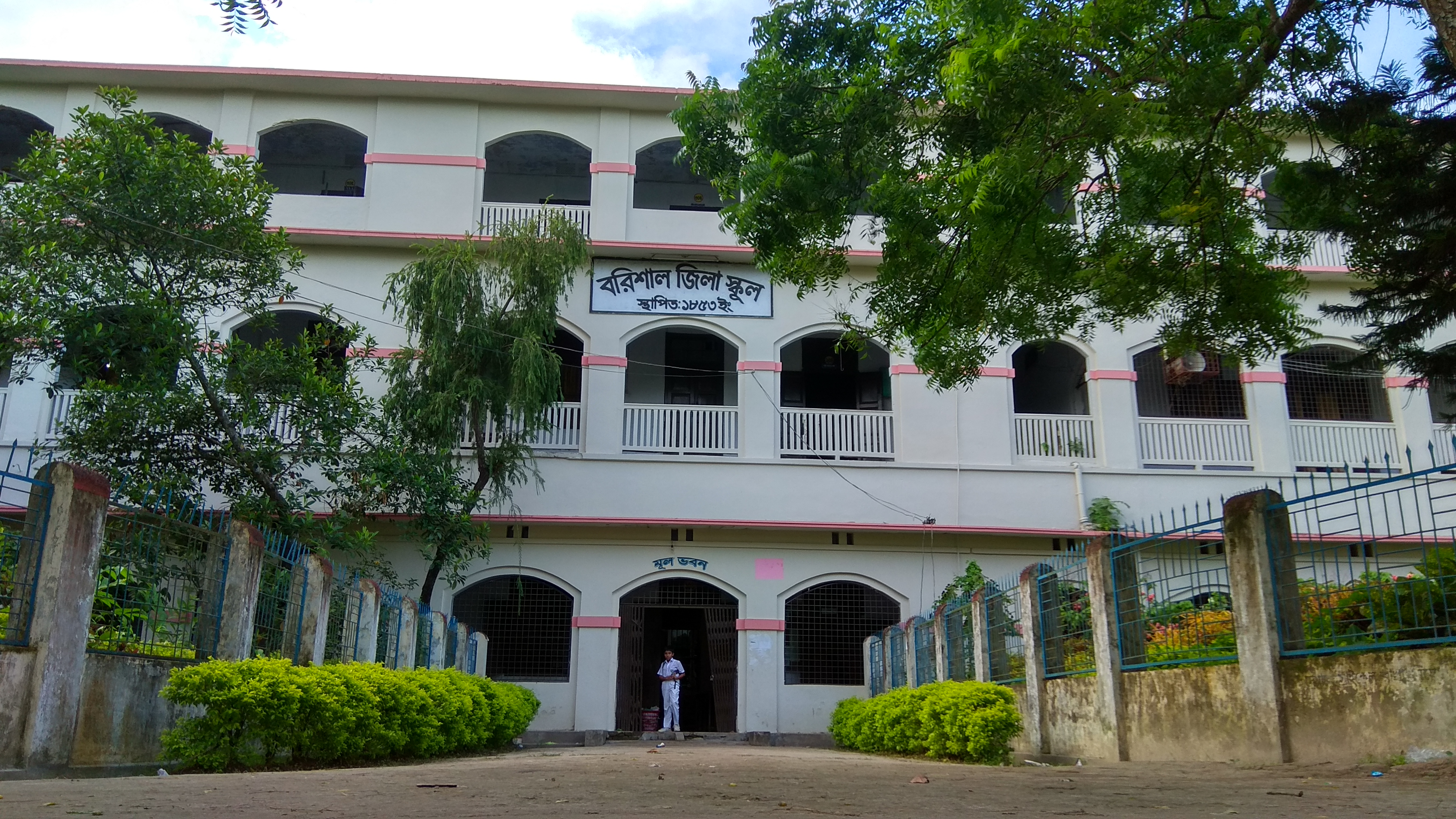
Barisal Zilla School Main Building (Est. 1829)

- Agailjhara Bhegai Halder Public Academy
- A Wahed Secondary Girls School
- A.B.R. High School
- A.R.S. Secondary Girls' School
- Alekanda Girls' High School
- Asmat Ali Khan (A.K.) Institution
- Baptist Mission Boys' High School
- Baptist Mission Girls' High School
- Barisal Government Girls' High School
- Barisal Residential School and College, Rupatoli
- Barishal Government Model School and College
- Barishal International School
- Barishal Zilla School
- Brojomohun School
- Collegiate Secondary School
- Fazlul Huq Residential School and College
- Halima Khatun Girls' Secondary School
- Jagadish Saraswat Girls School & College
- Jahanara Israil School & College (English version)
- Jhalakathi Government High School
- Kashipur Girls' High School and College
- Kashipur High School and College
- Kaunia Girls' High School
- Mamtaz Majidunnesa Girls Secondary School
- Mathuranath Public School
- Oxford Mission High School
- Royal Central School and College
- S.C.G.M. Secondary School (Chaitanya School)
- Sabera Khatun Girls' Secondary School
- Shahid Abdur Rab Serniabat Government High School
- Shahid Altaf Smrity Secondary Girls School
- Shahid Arjumoni Government High School
- Sher-e-Bangla Girls Secondary School
- Town High School
- Udayan Secondary School
- Nuria Secondary High School

== English medium schools ==
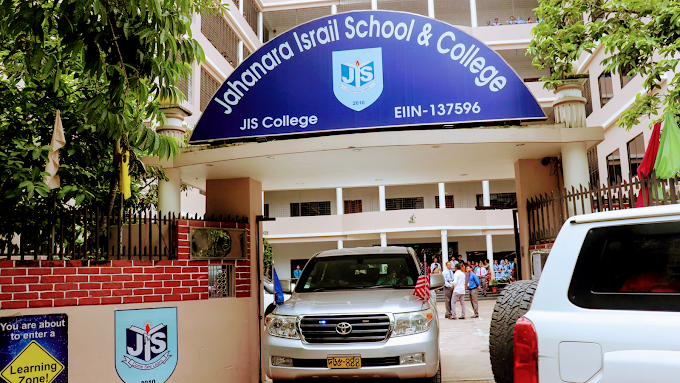
Jahanara Israil School & College (Est. 2010)

- Jahanara Israil School & College (English Version)
- Adventist International Mission School (English Version)

== Religious schools ==
- Charmonai Madrasah
- Jamia Islamia Mahmudia
- Jamia Islamia Hosainia Madrasah
- Lutfur Rahman Cadet Madrasah
- Sagardi Kamil Madrasah

== Technical schools ==
- Technical Training Center (T.T.C.), Barisal
- Barisal Mohila Technical Training Center
- Barisal Govt. Technical School & College
- UCEP Training School
- Trust College of Skill Development
- Youth Development Academy
- Govt. Physical Education College, Barisal
- Bilkis Jahan Technical School & BM College

== Drama schools ==
- Kheyali Group Theater
- Shabdaboli Group Theater
- Barisal Natok
- Barisal Theatre
- Ponchosiri Group Theatre
- Natyam Barisal
- Kirtonkhola Group Theatre
- Brojomohon Theatre
- Barisal Shilpomoncho

== Art schools ==
- Barisal Charukola School
- Barisal Shishu Academy
- Barisal Shilpakola Academy
- Mir Mujtaba Ali Art School (Kheyali Group Theatre).
- Shahid Altaf Mahmud Music School
- Khelaghar Barisal
- Udichi Barisal
- Chader Hat
- Akshar Shahittya
- Tansen Music School
- Prantik Music & Dance School

== Training institutes ==
- Shaheed Abdur Rob Serniabat Teacher Training College
- Higher Secondary Teacher Training Institute
- Sagardi Primary Teacher Training Institute
- Agriculture Training Institute, Rahmatpur

== Research institutions ==
- Bangladesh Rice Research Institution, Barisal
- Bangladesh Agricultural Research Institution, Barisal

== Special schools ==
- Barisal Night High School
- Barisal Intellectually disabled School

== See also ==
- List of educational institutions in Sylhet
- List of educational institutions in Khulna
- List of Educational Institutions in Comilla
