= Bangladesh Noubahini School and College =

Bangladesh Noubahini School and College are educational institutions run by Bangladesh Navy.

Bangladesh Noubahini School and College may also refer to:

- Bangladesh Noubahini School and College, Chattogram, an educational institution in Chittagong.
- Bangladesh Noubahini School and College Khulna, an educational institution in Khulna.
