= School and Colleges of Bangladesh Navy =

There are Bengali and English versions of schools and colleges for boys and girls controlled by the Bangladesh Navy.

== Dhaka Area ==
- Noubahini College, Dhaka
- Navy Anchorage School and College Dhaka
- Nau Paribar Shishu Niketon Dhaka

== Chittagong Area ==
- Bangladesh Noubahini School and College, Chattogram
- BN School Kaptai
- Navy Anchorage School and College Chittagong
- Nau Paribar Shishu Niketon Chittagong - 1 & 2
- Nau Paribar Shishu Niketon Kaptai
- Ashar Alo
- Rangunia Navy school

== Khulna Area ==
- Bangladesh Noubahini School and College Khulna
- BN School and College Mongla
- Navy Anchorage School and College Khulna
- Nau Paribar Shishu Niketon Khulna
- Nau Paribar Shishu Niketon Mongla
