= Bangladesh Noubahini School and College Khulna =

- বাংলাদেশ নৌবাহিনী স্কুল ও কলেজ, খুলনা

Location
- Sailors Colony, Goalkhali, Khalishpur; Khulna, GPO - 9000; Bangladesh
- 22.8527°N 89.532°E

Information
- Type: Autonomous educational institution run by Bangladesh Navy
- Motto: Education is Progress (শিক্ষাই প্রগতি)
- Patron saints: Admiral M Nazmul Hassan, OSP, NPP, ndc, ncc, psc, BN
- Established: 1979
- School board: Board of Intermediate and Secondary Education, Jessore
- School number: EIIN: 117112
- Chairman: Rear Admiral A K M Jakir Hossain, ndc afwc, psc, BN
- Principal: Captain M. Samsujjaman vuiya, BN
- Grades: Class I to XII
- Gender: Combined
- Education system: NCTB Curriculum
- Language: Bangla
- Campus type: Urban
- Colors: Blue and white
- Nickname: BNSCK
- Website: www.bncollegekhulna.edu.bd

Bangladesh Noubahini School and College Khulna is an academic institute run by the Bangladesh Navy and located at Goalkhali, Khalishpur, GPO - 9000, Khulna. Its institutional code (EIIN) is 117112.

== History ==
Bangladesh Noubahini School and College, Khulna, was established in 1979 under the supervision of the Bangladesh Navy. The institution was founded primarily to provide quality education to the children of naval personnel stationed in Khulna. Over time, admission was opened to civilian students as well, making it a respected educational institution for the wider community.

== Academic activities ==
The institute has three disciplines for secondary and higher secondary sections: Science, Business Studies and Humanities. Its public examinations are conducted under the Board of Intermediate and Secondary Education, Jessore. Students from a service background and meritorious civil students can both study here.

== Student activities ==
Besides academics, students of BN School & College, Khulna get involved in different extracurricular activities such as sports, culture, literature, debate, art, social welfare activities, and other creative arenas. They also take part in Sea Rover Scouting and BNCC (Naval Wing).

== See also ==
- School and Colleges of Bangladesh Navy
- Bangladesh Navy College, Dhaka
- Bangladesh Navy School and College, Chittagong
