= KPC =

KPC may refer to:

== Businesses and organisations ==
=== Educational institutions ===
- Kenai Peninsula College, Alaska
- Khulna Public College, Bangladesh

=== Government bodies and companies ===
- King's Privy Council for Canada
- Kenya Pipeline Company
- Kosovo Protection Corps
- Kuwait Petroleum Corporation

=== Religious organisations ===
- Kampala Pentecostal Church, Uganda
- Kiribati Protestant Church, now Kiribati Uniting Church
- Kunzang Palyul Choling, a Tibetan Buddhist organisation

=== Other businesses ===
- KPC Media Group, a newspaper publisher in Indiana, US

== Science and technology ==
- kiloparsec (kpc), a unit of measurement used in astronomy
- Klebsiella pneumoniae carbapenemase, the gene for an enzyme produced by some highly antibiotic-resistant bacteria

== Other uses ==
- Kaltim Prima Coal, a thermal coal mine in Kalimantan Timur, Indonesia
- Key purchasing criteria, a business term defining factors that contribute to a consumer's buying decision
