= IGV =

IGV may refer to:

- IgV, part of the classification of Immunoglobulin superfamily
- Independent Green Voice, a far-right political party in Scotland
- IGV schools, part of educational institutions in Khulna
