= Jessore (disambiguation) =

Jessore is a city in and district headquarter of Jessore District in Bangladesh.

Jessore may also refer to:

- Jessore District, a district in the southwestern region of Bangladesh
  - Jessore Cantonment, a cantonment in Jessore District
