= Sheikh Mohammed Abdullah (Bangladeshi politician) =

Bangladeshi politician (1945–2020)

- শেখ মোহাম্মদ আবদুল্লাহ
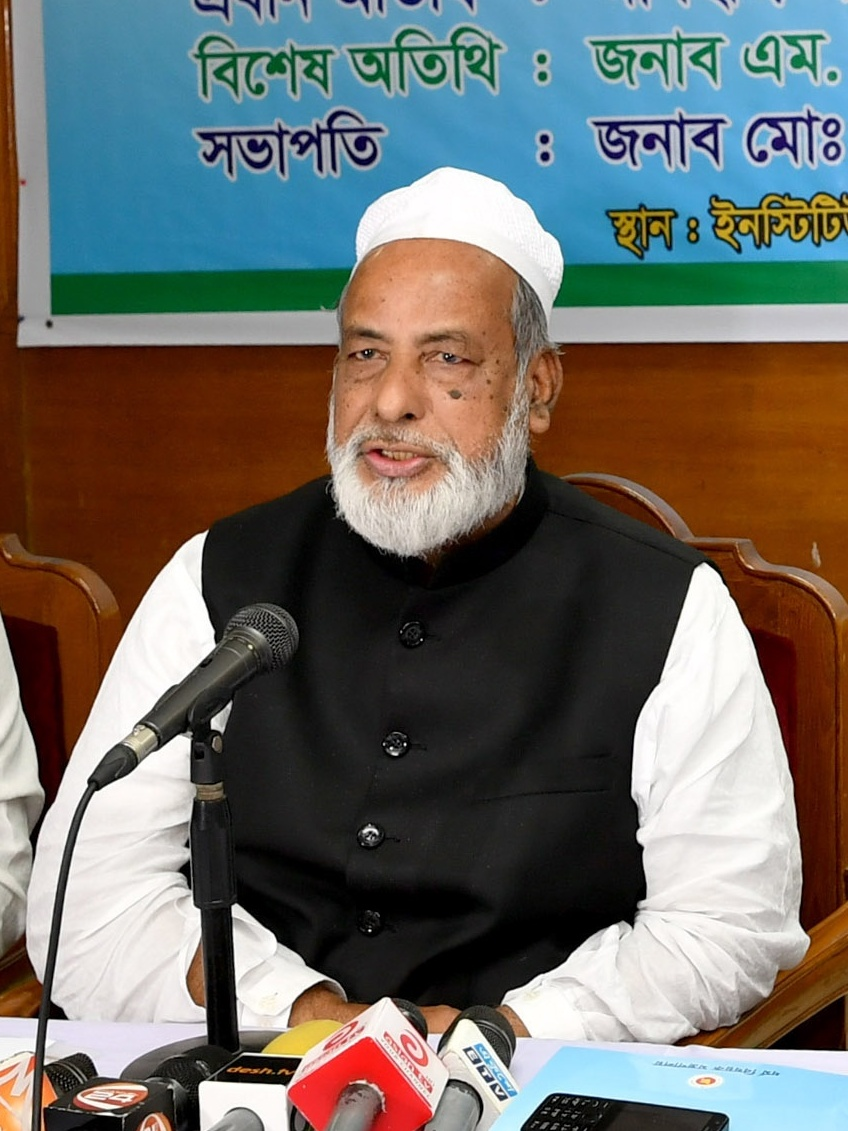
- Sheikh Mohammed Abdullah in 2019

State Minister of Religious Affairs
- In office 7 January 2019 – 13 June 2020
- Prime Minister: Sheikh Hasina
- Preceded by: Motiur Rahman
- Succeeded by: Md Faridul Haq Khan

Personal details
- Born: 8 September 1945 Gopalganj Mohhakuma, Bengal Presidency, British India
- Died: 13 June 2020 (aged 74) Dhaka, Bangladesh
- Cause of death: COVID-19
- Party: Bangladesh Awami League
- Children: He has a son named Sheikh Mohammadullah and nine daughters
- Education: Azam Khan College; University of Dhaka

Sheikh Mohammed Abdullah (8 September 1945 – 13 June 2020) was a Bangladesh Awami League politician and lawyer who served as the State Minister of Religious Affairs from 2019 until his death in 2020. He was appointed the minister in the Fourth Sheikh Hasina Cabinet in January 2019.

== Early life and education ==
Sheikh Mohammed Abdullah was born on 8 September 1945 in Gopalganj in the then Bengal Presidency, British India, in Kekania village, he is son of Sheikh Mohammad Matiur Rahman and Mosammat Rabia Khatun. He studied at a Qawmi madrasa and at Sultan Shahi Kekania primary school and high school. He completed his undergraduate studies at Azam Khan Government Commerce College in the Khulna District. In 1972, he completed his master's degree in communication from University of Dhaka. Two years later, in 1974, he completed his second masters in economics from the same university.

== Career ==
Abdullah was the founding president of the Gopalganj unit of Jubo League, the youth wing of Awami League. He joined his former high school, Sultan Shahi Kekania High School, as the headmaster. He fought in the Bangladesh Liberation War as a member of the Mujib Bahini in 1971. In 1975, he was appointed the Joint Secretary of Gopalganj unit of the Bangladesh Krishak Sramik Awami League. Then he served as the General Secretary of Gopalganj District Awami League for a long time and later also served as the president. Then he also served as the Religious Affairs Secretary of the Bangladesh Awami League Central Committee for a long time. He has also held various important positions at different times.

Abdullah practiced law at Dhaka and Gopalganj courts after getting a law degree from Central Law College, Dhaka in 1977. He served as the chief election agent of Sheikh Hasina, Prime Minister of Bangladesh, in the Gopalganj-3 constituency. On 7 January 2019, he was appointed the State Minister of Religious Affairs.

== Death ==
Abdullah died on 13 June 2020, near Jahangir Gate of Dhaka Cantonment while on his way to Combined Military Hospital, Dhaka. He was found infected with COVID-19 after his death, marking the first death of a sitting cabinet minister in Bangladesh during the COVID-19 pandemic in Bangladesh.
