= Selim Morshed =

Bangladeshi fiction writer

- সেলিম মোরশেদ
- Born: 22 March 1962 (age 64); Jessore, East Pakistan, Pakistan
- Occupation: Writer

Selim Morshed (born 22 March 1962) is a Bangladeshi fiction writer.

== Background and career ==
Selim Morshed was born on 22 March in Jessore in the then East Pakistan. He studied in Jessore Cantonment Public School, Jessore Municipal Preparatory High School, Satkhira Govt. College, Govt. Sundarban Adarsha College, and Dhaka College.

Morshed made the winners list of Bangla Academy Literary Award in the fiction category published on 23 January 2025. He has authored 10 books. However, his name was excluded on a revised list published 6 days later.

== Awards ==
- Loke Literary Award (2019)
