= Cantonment College, Jashore =

Educational institution (College) in Jashore, Bangladesh

- ক্যান্টনমেন্ট কলেজ, যশোর

Location
- Jessore Cantonment; Bangladesh
- 23°10′14″N 89°11′22″E

Information
- Established: 1969
- School board: Board of Intermediate and Secondary Education, Jessore
- Authority: Bangladesh Army
- Grades: 11-Master's
- Enrollment: 6,000
- Website: jcc.edu.bd

Cantonment College, Jashore is a college located in Arabpur, Jessore, Bangladesh. Established in 1969, the college, which has 6,000 students, is regulated by the Bangladesh Army.

== History ==
The college was established in 1969 as an extension of Daud Public School. Initially it offered only a humanities stream. A science stream was added in 1977. In 1983 the college was relocated to the present campus. A business studies stream was added in 1985.

BA, BSS. & B.Com. courses started in 1993 and BSc. course in 1995. Honor's courses in economics, political science and Bengali were initiated in 1996. Master's courses in these three subjects began to be offered in 1999. Honor's courses in accounting, management, mathematics, social work, Islamic history, Islamic studies, and BBA started in 2005.

== Academics ==
Higher secondary streams include science, commerce and humanities. The college also offers honors courses, including Bengali, social work, Islamic history, Islamic studies, accounting, management, BBA, and mathematics.

The college ranked first among institutions under the Board of Intermediate and Secondary Education, Jessore in terms of obtaining GPA-5 in the 2010 Higher Secondary School Certificate (HSC) examination.

== Co-curricular activities ==
The college's debating team was the runner-up in the 2015 Inter Cantonment Parliamentary Debate Competition.
