= Akij Collegiate School =

Coordinates: 23.062937°N 89.012427°E

Information
- Established: 1991; 34 years ago
- Teaching staff: 50
- Grades: 6-12
- Enrollment: 1500

Akij Collegiate School is a Bangladeshi private college, founded in 1991. It is located in Navaran, Jhikargachha Upazila, Jessore District. The college is part of the Akij Group, and was founded by SK Akij Uddin. It is under Jessore Education Board.

The school has 50 teachers serving 1,500 students in 6th - 12th.
