= Jahanabad Cantonment =

Bangladeshi military cantonment

- Phultala, Khulna, Bangladesh

Site information
- Type: Cantonment
- Controlled by: Bangladesh Army

Location
- Coordinates: 22.9232°N 89.4990°E

Jahanabad Cantonment is a cantonment of the Bangladesh Army located in Khulna, Bangladesh.

== Installations ==
- Army Service Corps Centre and School (ASC&S)
  - RVFC Records Office
  - Branch Recruiting Unit, Khulna
- Station Headquarters, Jahanabad
  - Combined Military Hospital
  - Static Signals Company, Khulna
- 57th Military Police Unit (Attached under 55th Infantry Division)

== Education ==
- Military Collegiate School Khulna (MCSK)
- Cantonment Public School & College, Jahanabad
