= Daud Public School and College =

Dawood Public School And College
- দাউদ পাবলিক স্কুল এন্ড কলেজ
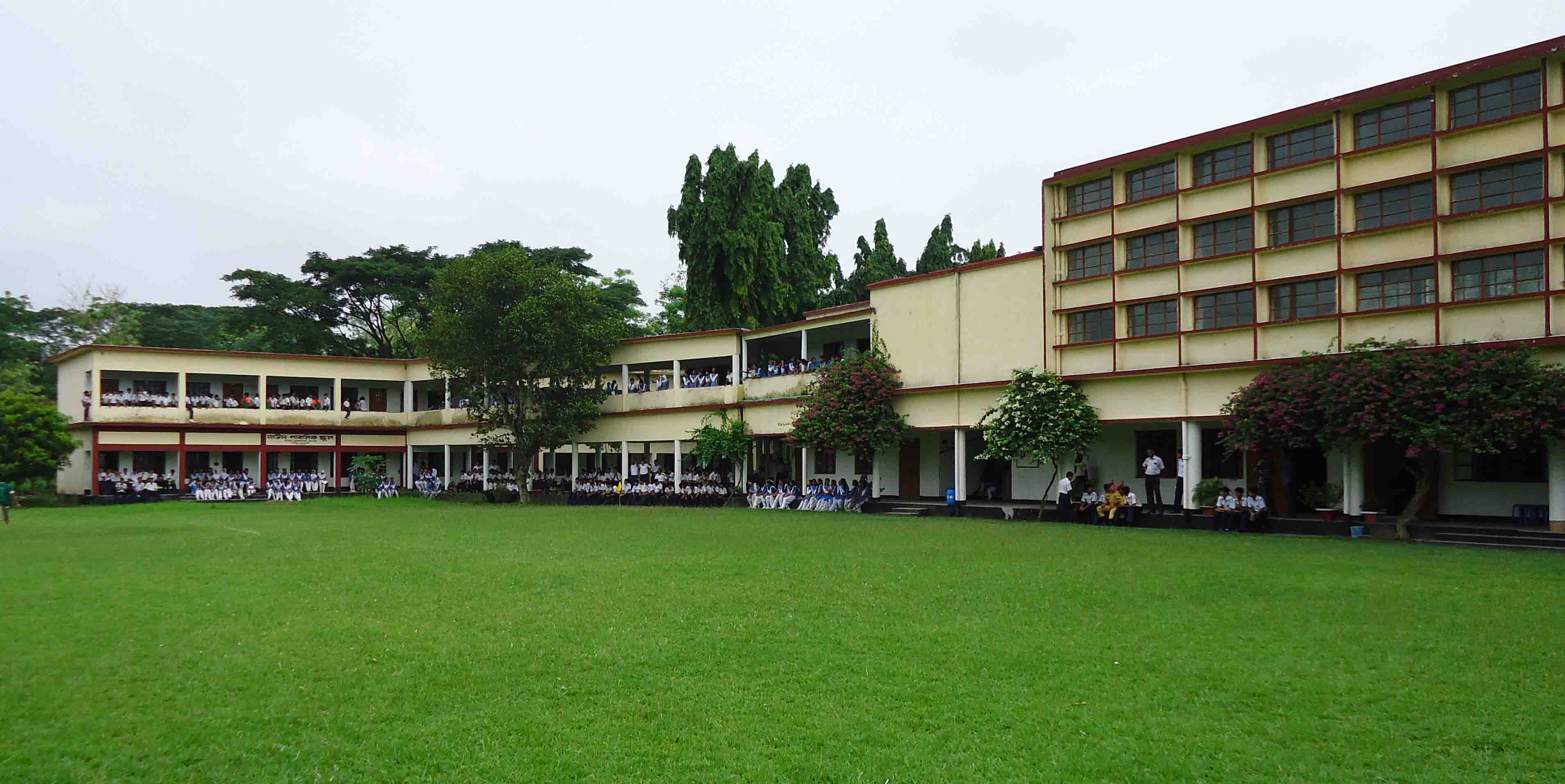

Location
- Jessore Cantonment; Jessore, 7400; Bangladesh
- Coordinates: 23.1856°N 89.1724°E

Information
- Type: Educational institution
- Motto: উন্নত মম শির (High is my head)
- Established: 1959
- Founder: Ahmed Dawood
- School board: Cantonment Board, Jessore
- School district: Jessore
- Authority: Army Headquarters
- Principal: Sahariar Nafiz
- Gender: Male
- Language: Bangla
- Team name: Shahidullah House, Madhusudan House, Nazrul House
- Publication: Dawood Prova
- Website: www.daudpublicschool.edu.bd

Daud Public School And College (DPSC) (Bengali: দাউদ পাবলিক স্কুল এন্ড কলেজ) is located Jessore Cantonment, Jessore, Bangladesh. This institute is run by Jessore Cantonment Board, under the Directorate of Military Lands and Cantonment, Government of the People's Republic of Bangladesh. The school is situated in the center of Jessore Cantonment, situated on 18.71 acres of land. The institute was founded by Ahmed Dawood, an industrialist of greater Jessore.

== History ==
On 3 September 1959 the foundation was laid. The building's construction was funded by the Dawood Group, at a cost of Rs. 6,33,636, hence it was named Dawood Public School after the donor Ahmed Dawood.

The first class started on 17 June 1961. Prior to independence, this institution was an English medium school and equivalent to the public schools of the then West Pakistan. In early 1959, the initial decision of founding the school was taken. Later on, was made into reality with help of the funding from Ahmed Dawood. An abandoned go-down used by British airbase during Second World War was selected as the location for the school. Initially, the journey started with 1 office room and 2 classroom rooms. At that time, curriculum prepared by Cambridge University were followed till the eighth grade.

Separation of Nursery And KG section

In the year 1995, the nursery and kindergarten classes were removed and started the journey as separate kindergarten named Poroshmoni Kindergarten (Presently known as Jessore International School)

Separation of College Section

In the year 1983, the college section was moved to new institute called Cantonment College. From that time to up until 2015 the school was known as Daud Public School as the college section was removed.

Reestablishment of the College Section

On 1 July 2015 the authority reestablished the college and it renamed back to its founding name Daud Public School And College. The Education Ministry approved the operation college section on 28 December 2014, and it was renamed back to its previous name on that day.

== Curriculum ==
- School Secondary Level SSC

Group — Science,& Business Studies

- Higher Secondary Level HSC

Group — Science, Humanities & Business Studies

== Faculties ==
The institution has three faculties of Science, Humanities and Business studies under the supervision of three separate Course Co-ordinators.

=== Faculty of Science ===
- Department of Physics
- Department of Chemistry
- Department of Biology
- Department of Mathematics
- Department of Computer Science
- Department of Engineering and Drawing
- Department of Psychology
- Department of Ict

=== Faculty of (Arts)Humanities ===
- Department of English
- Department of Bangla
- Department of Economics
- Department of Political Science
- Department of Geography
- Department of Islamic studies
- Department of Social Welfare
- Department of Logic
- Department of history

=== Faculty of(Commerce)Business Studies ===
- Department of Accounting
- Department of Management
- Department of Economics & Commercial Geography
- Department of Office Management& Secretarial Science
- Department of Marketing
- Department of Finance & Banking

== Clubs ==
- BNCC
- Girl Guide
- Boy Scout
- Cultural
- Red Crescent
- Computer
- Photography
- Math
- English
- Science
- Debate
- Sports
- Song

== Campus ==
Daud Public School And College is located at Jessore Cantonment.

== Uniform ==
	In summer	In winter
For Boys	Half sleeve shirt with shoulder with the badge of respective house color, stripe on the shoulder for class – XI and 2 strips class – XII.; Navy Blue Color full pant, half pant for the primary section sober black belt, black shoe, black socks, white sock and shoes for the primary section.; Nameplate, Institute monogram badge.	Full sleeve shirt with same shoulder for every group.; Other criteria would be the same.; Navy blue color sweater.
For girls	Navy blue Kameez with a belt, with shoulder and folded orna tucked in the belt, college monogram on the pocket.; The color of the shoulder badge would be the same as the boys for every section.; White salwar, white orna, white shoe, white socks.; Navy blue color frock for the primary section.; Nameplate, Institute monogram badge.	Navy blue cardigan with the same criteria.

== Results ==
SSC Result-2014
Faculty	Total Students	Passed	GPA 5	GPA 4-5	GPA-3.5-4	Pass Rate
Science	69	69	53	16	–	100%
Humanities	–	–	–	–	–	–
B.Studies	11	11	1	7	3	100%
Total	80	80	54	23	3	100%

SSC Result-2015
Faculty	Total Students	Passed	GPA 5	GPA 4-5	GPA-3.5-4	Pass Rate
Science	81	81	48	31	2	100%
Humanities	–	–	–	–	–	–
B.Studies	10	10	–	7	3	100%
Total	91	91	48	38	5	100%

SSC Result-2016
Faculty	Total Students	Passed	GPA 5	GPA 4-5	GPA-3.5-4	Pass Rate
Science	84	84	72	12	–	100%
Humanities	–	–	–	–	–	–
B.Studies	6	6	1	4	1	100%
Total	90	90	73	16	1	100%
