= Dumuria Govt. Technical School and College =

- ডুমুরিয়া সরকারি টেকনিক্যাল স্কুল ও কলেজ
- Dumuria Upazila, Khulna; Bangladesh

Information
- Type: Public School
- Established: 2021; 5 years ago
- Principal: Engr Abdus Salam Miah
- Education Board of Bangladesh: Bangladesh Technical Education Board
- Staff: 25
- Enrollment: 750
- Campus: Dumuria Upazila
- Sports: Cricket, Football, Badminton, Table Tennis, Volleyball
- Website: dumuriatsc.edu.bd

Dumuria Government Technical School and College (Bengali: ডুমুরিয়া সরকারি টেকনিক্যাল স্কুল ও কলেজ) is a public educational institution located at Dumuria Upazila in Khulna, Bangladesh.

== History ==
Ten other projects, implemented by the Education Engineering Department (EED) and Dumuria Technical School and College, are among them.
