= Khulna Zilla School =

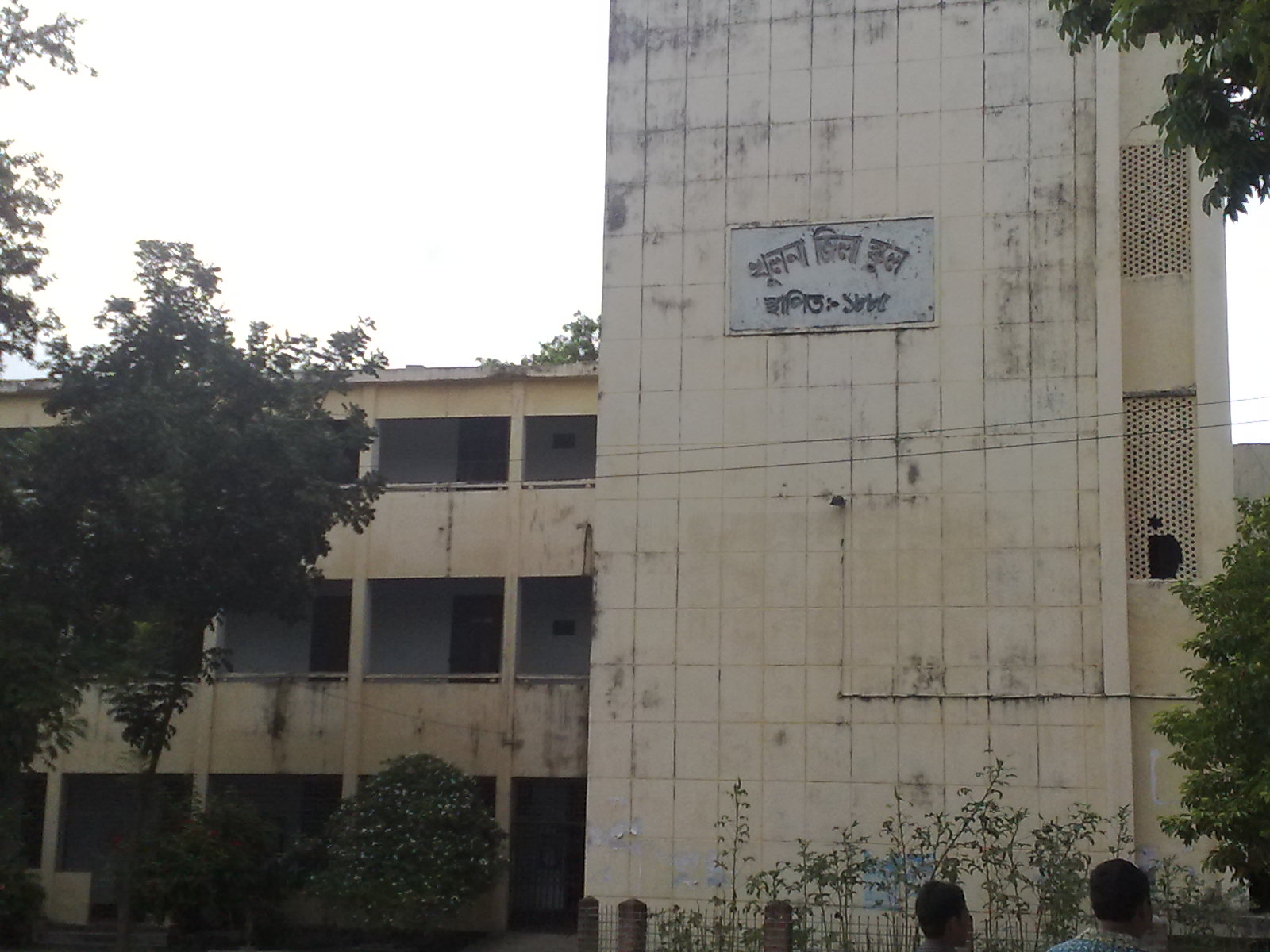
- School office building

Location
- KD Ghosh Road, Khulna; Bangladesh; 22.8131°N 89.5741°E

Information
- Type: Public
- Motto: জ্ঞানই শক্তি
- Established: 1885 (141 years ago)
- Headmaster: Mollah Moksed Ali (Temporary)
- Faculty: 50
- Enrollment: 3000 (approximately)
- Sports: Basketball, cricket
- Website: kzs.edu.bd

Khulna Zilla School (Bengali: খুলনা জিলা স্কুল) is the oldest high school in the Khulna district of Bangladesh. It was established in 1885. It provides education from class three (Grade-3) to class ten (Grade-10).

The school has 50 faculty members and about 3000 students. The faculty members are graduates from universities in Bangladesh. Student applicants, mostly from top elementary schools were used to be put through a competitive admission selection process. Currently students are selected through lottery because of current education system in Bangladesh.

== Admission ==
Students are admitted into class three. After an initial screening, more than 5000 applicants appear at a comprehensive admission test for only 240 positions. Only a few meritorious students can get admitted in class 6 and 9. Currently students are admitted through lottery for current education system in Bangladesh.

== Building and grounds ==
There used to be five buildings in this school but one of them was demolished due to its bad condition and safety of students. There is a very big playground in front of the school buildings. In this ground many outdoor games are organized. Now, Khulna Zilla School has a basketball ground also.

== Alumni ==
- Farrukh Ahmad, poet
- Durga Das Basu, Indian jurist and constitutional scholar
- Arabinda Ghosh, Communist Party of India (Marxist) politician
- Abdus Sabur Khan, politician
- Serajul Alam Khan, political theorist
- Anil Kumar Sen, Chief Justice of Calcutta High Court
- Dipak Kumar Sen, Chief Justice of Patna High Court

== See also ==
- Khulna
- List of Zilla Schools of Bangladesh
- List of educational institutions in Khulna
- Khulna Public College
