= Education Engineering Department =

Bangladesh government department

- Formation: 1972
- Headquarters: Dhaka, Bangladesh
- Region served: Bangladesh
- Official language: Bengali
- Website: www.eedmoe.gov.bd

The Education Engineering Department (Bengali: শিক্ষা প্রকৌশল অধিদপ্তর) is a Bangladesh government department under the Ministry of Education. It is responsible for implementing government projects of education, the building and maintenance of buildings of public education institutes, and planning and managing development work is the education sector. Md Raihan Badsha is the chief engineer of the department.

== History ==
The Education Engineering Department traces back to an Engineering unit, created in 1972 by President Sheikh Mujibur Rahman, for the reconstruction, repair, and renovation for the damage done in the Bangladesh Liberation war. The engineering department was given the Development of Selected Non-Government Secondary Schools project with a budget of 106,490,500,000 taka and is scheduled to complete the project by 2020.
