= Khulna Government Mohila College =

College in Khulna, Bangladesh

- খুলনা সরকারি মহিলা কলেজ
- Former name: Rajendra Kumar Girls' College
- Type: National, coeducational, Higher Secondary, Honors, Degree, Masters
- Established: July 18, 1940
- Founder: Roy Bahadur Mahendra Kumar Ghosh
- Principal: Rawshon Akter
- Academic staff: 218
- Students: 11,450
- Location: Boyra, Khulna District, Bangladesh; 22.8376°N 89.5382°E
- Campus: Urban
- Language: Bangla
- Website: kgmc.ac.bd

Khulna Government Mohila College is a women's college in Khulna, Bangladesh. It offers Higher Secondary School Certificates, bachelor's degrees (ordinary and honours) and master's degrees. It's one of the oldest girls college in Khulna.

== History ==
The college was established on 18 July 1940 as Rajendra Kumar Girls' College. It was founded by Roy Bahadur Mahendra Kumar Ghosh as an Intermediate College. In 1964, it added Degree (Pass) and Honours courses.

== Course ==
In 1961, the HSC level was offered. In 1964, Degree (Pass) and Honours courses were added. Master's Preliminary and Master's Final courses were established in 1993.

=== Degree (Pass) ===
- B. A. (Pass)
- B. S. S. (Pass)
- B.Sc. (Pass)

=== Honours ===
- Bangla
- English
- History
- Islamic history and culture
- Philosophy
- Political science
- Economics
- Physics
- Chemistry
- Botany
- Zoology
- Mathematics

Front View of Khulna Govt. Girls College

=== Master's ===
- Bangla
- English
- History
- Philosophy
- Political science
- Economics

== Faculty ==
- Principal: K M Touhidur Rahman
- Vice Principal: Md. Mizanur Rahman
- Head Clerk: S. M. Abu Hossain

== See also ==
- List of educational institutions in Khulna
