= City Polytechnic Institute Khulna =

College in Bangladesh

City Polytechnic Institute, Khulna
- সিটি পলিটেকনিক ইন্সটিটিউট, খুলনা
- Type: Polytechnic, Coeducational
- Established: 2003
- Academic affiliations: BTEB, MSDNAA
- Chairman: Sk. Jahangir Alam
- Students: 3000
- Location: Khulna, Bangladesh; 22.8480°N 89.5422°E
- Website: cpik.ac.bd

City Polytechnic Institute, Khulna (Bengali: সিটি পলিটেকনিক ইন্সটিটিউট খুলনা) is the largest and first non-government polytechnic institute in Khulna, Bangladesh.

== History ==
In early 2003, the Ford Foundation established City Polytechnic Institute, Khulna with a duration of 4 years long courses, based on the syllabus of BTEB.

== Academics ==
=== Faculties and departments ===
This institution offers a Diploma in Engineering, Diploma in Textile Technology and six-month short courses under the Bangladesh Technical Education Board.

==== Diploma in Engineering ====
- Computer Technology
- Electronics Technology
- Electrical Technology
- Civil Technology
- Telecommunication Technology
- Mechanical Technology
- Marine Technology

==== Diploma in Textile Technology ====
- Textile Technology
- Garments Design and Pattern Making Technology

==== Six-month short courses ====
- Computer Office Application
- Database Programming

== See also ==
- Dhaka Polytechnic Institute
