= Border Guard Public School, Jessore =

- বর্ডার গার্ড পাবলিক স্কুল, যশোর

Location
- Jhumjhum Pur, Jessore; Bangladesh
- Coordinates: 23.1611°N 89.2303°E

Information
- Type: Public pre-primary, primary & secondary
- Motto: শিক্ষা শৃঙ্খলা প্রগতি (Educational Discipline Progress)
- Established: 1996
- Headmaster: Md. Abu Daud
- Faculty: 30 (full-time teachers)
- Campus size: 1.94 Acres
- Colors: White and Dark blue
- Website: borderguardschooljessore.jessoreboard.gov.bd

Border Guard Public School, Jessore (Bengali: বর্ডার গার্ড পাবলিক স্কুল, যশোর), previously known as Rifles School, Jessore, is a secondary school located in Jhum Jhum Pur, Jessore city, Bangladesh.

== History ==
Border Guard Public School, Jessore was established in 1996 under the supervision of the then Bangladesh Rifles (now Border Guard Bangladesh). Initially named Rifles School, Jessore, it was later renamed following the institutional rebranding in 2010. The school was founded to provide quality education to the children of border force personnel and civilians in the Jessore region. It operates under the Jessore Education Board and follows the national curriculum. Over the years, it has grown in enrollment and infrastructure, and remains one of the key educational institutions managed by BGB.

== See also ==
- List of schools in Bangladesh
