= Military Collegiate School Khulna =

Military Collegiate School Khulna (MCSK)
- মিলিটারি কলেজিয়েট স্কুল খুলনা

Location
- Phultala; Khulna; Bangladesh; 22.957°N 89.460°E

Information
- Type: Residential
- Motto: Learn To Succeed
- Established: 5 January 2002
- Principal: Brig Gen Md Zahid Hossain, ndc, psc
- Grades: Class VII to XII
- Enrollment: 700
- Language: English
- Website: mcsk.edu.bd

Military Collegiate School Khulna (MCSK) (Bengali: মিলিটারি কলেজিয়েট স্কুল খুলনা (এম সি এস কে) is a Military high school in Khulna, Bangladesh.

== Location ==
MCSK is situated in close proximity to the city, with connectivity via road and railway communication, It is approximately 6.5 km northwest of Jahanabad Cantonment, Khulna, and about 4.5 km southwest of Phultala Upazila.

=== Boys' wing ===
MCSK started on 5 January 2002 with 50 students in class VIII.

== Houses ==
There are two storied four houses for the Cadets' accommodation. These houses are named after Sufi Awlias of Islamic History of Bangladesh. Cadets are also identified with their respective houses during their staying in MCSK. Besides that, all the competitions of this institution are mainly house-based. To create a competitive spirit amongst the cadets, the houses play a vital role. Cadets also put their best efforts to uphold the image and name of their houses. According to seniority of establishment, the houses are:

Khan Jahan Ali House:

  - House Color: "Green",
  - House Motto: "In victory we trust. "

Shah Jalal House:

  - House Color: "Red",
  - House motto: "Success lies in diligence."

Shah Makhdum House:

  - House Color: "Blue",
  - House Motto: "Infinity is our destiny."

Shah Amanat House:

  - House Color: "Maroon"(Old), "Yellow"(New).
  - House Motto: "Learn to accept not to doubt." (Old), "By example we lead." (New)

=== Girls' wing ===
MCSK has brought up the chance for the girls of Bangladesh to study on its campus. With this objective, the MCSK girls wing started in 2013 with 108 students of classes VII and IX.There are three houses to facilitate the accommodation of the cadets of girls' wing.The houses are:

1.Birprotik Dr. Captain Sitara Begum House

 House colour: Red
 House motto: "Born to struggle, destined to win."

2. Dr. Nilima Ibrahim House

 House colour: Blue
 House motto: "Morning never shows the day."

3. Shaheed Janani Jahanara Imam House

  House colour: Green
  House motto: "Play with bravery, shine on greenery."

== Structure ==
The boys' wing is split up into 4 houses and the girls' wing into 3. Competitions are held on the basis of these houses, and points are awarded to the champion and runner-up houses. At the end of the year the house with the most points is awarded the Overall Championship.

== Governance ==
MCSK's governing body is chaired by the General Officer Commanding, 55th Infantry Division, and Area Commander, Jessore Area. The governing body lays down board policies for the day-to-day administration of the school and approves required financial policies for the accomplishment of the school objective. However, much of the decision-making authority rests on the Principle, which is changed every year. This often results in contradictory policies as different officers have varying visions for the college.
