= Barisal Divisional Museum =

Museum in Bangladesh

Coordinates: 22.7013°N 90.3733°E

Barisal Divisional Museum is located in the Barisal District, Bangladesh. It was officially inaugurated on 8 June 2015 by the Minister of Cultural Affairs, Asaduzzaman Noor. The museum was opened to the public following the inauguration.

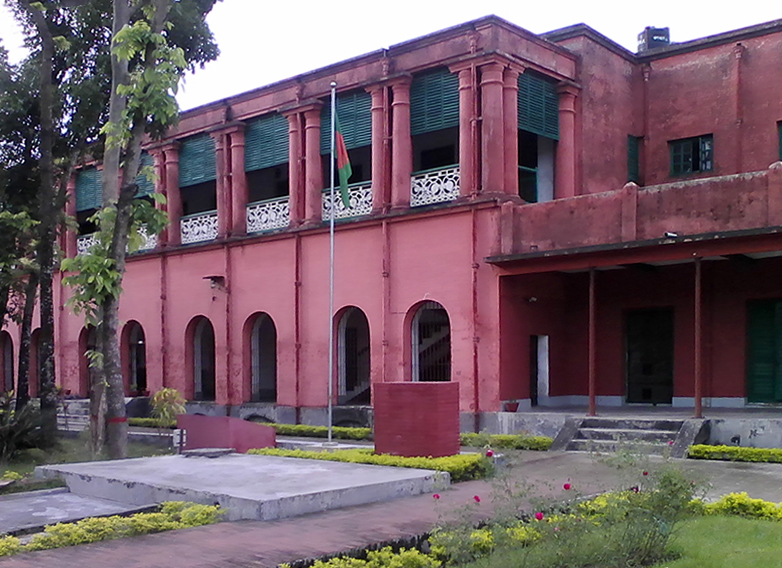
The Collectorate Building, constructed in 1821, was renovated and converted into the Barisal Divisional Museum.

== Description ==
The Collectorate Bhaban of the city, constructed in 1821, was renovated to establish the Barisal Divisional Museum. In 1979, however, the Public Works Department declared the building unsuitable for use, and it was abandoned in 1984. In 2003, the government issued a gazette notification designating the building as a protected antiquity. The building's possession was transferred to the Department of Archaeology in 2005. Later that year, the structure was renovated and converted into the divisional museum. Although renovation work was completed in 2007, the museum's activities could not be initiated until later.

On the second floor of the museum, nine galleries display the geography and natural environment of the Barisal Division, prominent personalities of the region, cultural heritage, folk art, archaeological artifacts, and historical traditions of Bangladesh. Over 200 collected items have been arranged across these galleries. Additionally, the history, architectural style, and features of the Collectorate Building itself are presented as a symbol of colonial architectural heritage. Visitors can visit the museum from 10 a.m. to 6 p.m. during summer and from 9 a.m. to 6 p.m. during winter. The entry fee is 5 taka for secondary-level students and 10 taka for adults. For citizens of SAARC countries, the fee is 25 taka, and for citizens of other countries, it is 100 taka. Children under the age of five can enter free of charge. The museum is equipped with CCTV cameras and a special alarm system for security.

== Gallery ==
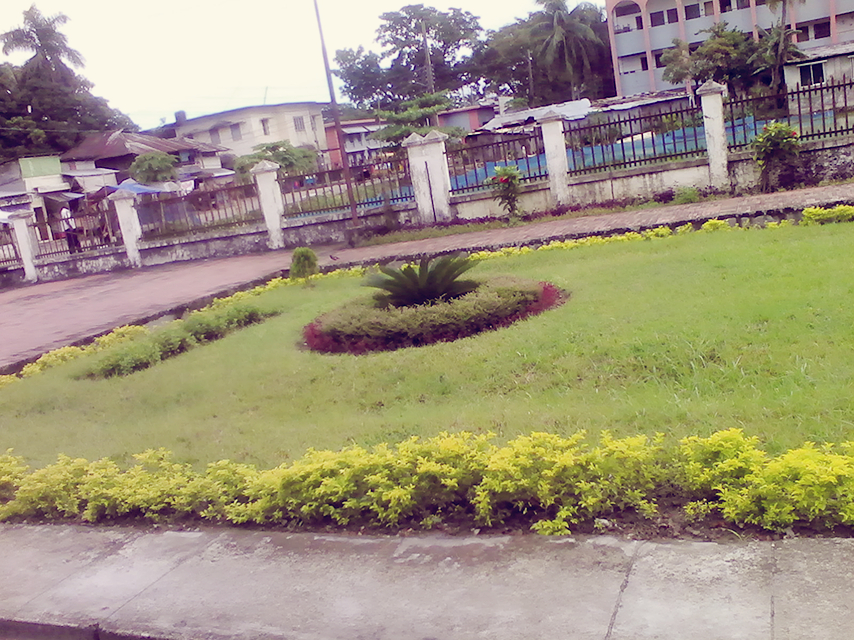
Garden

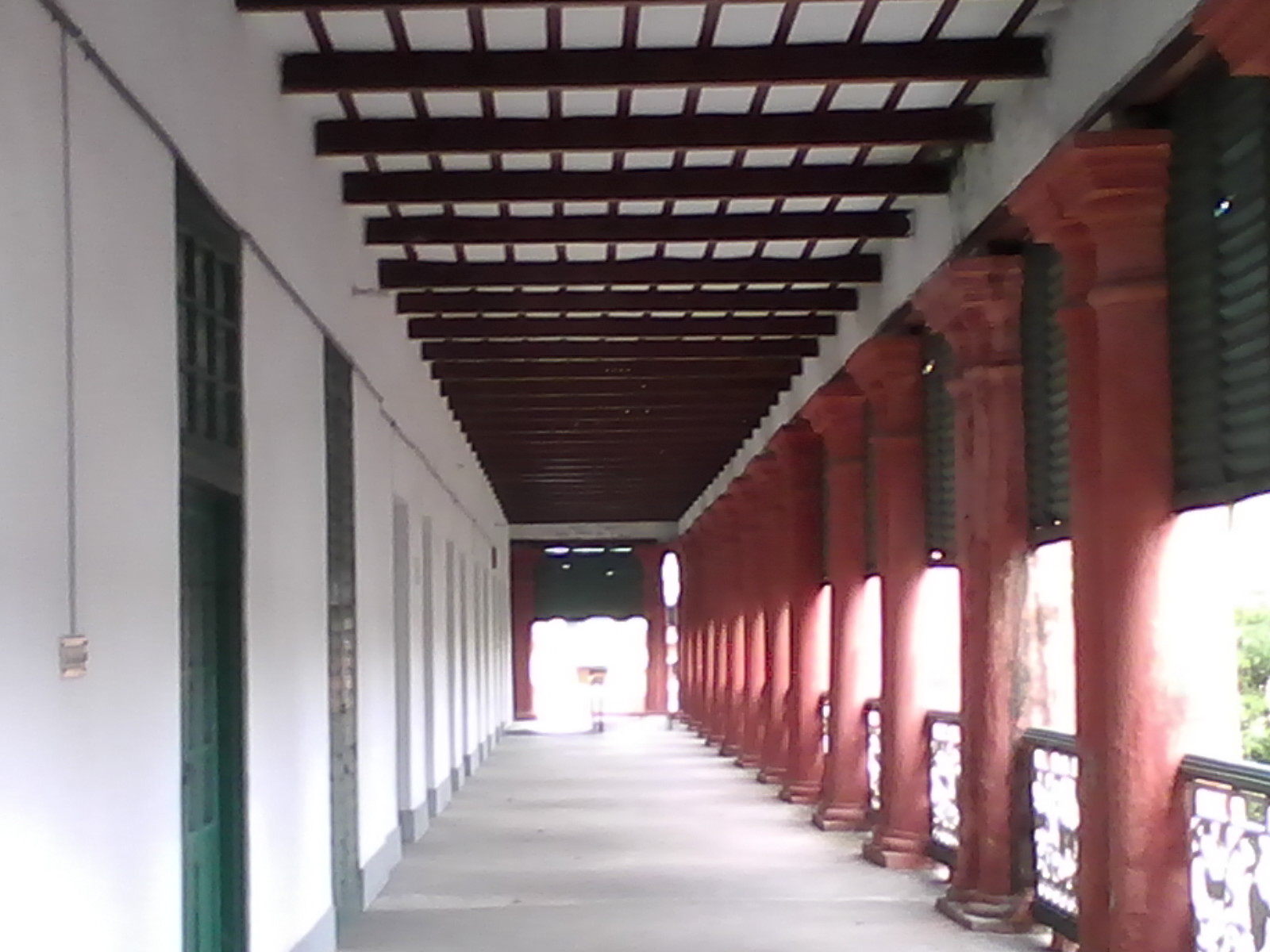
Old decorative details

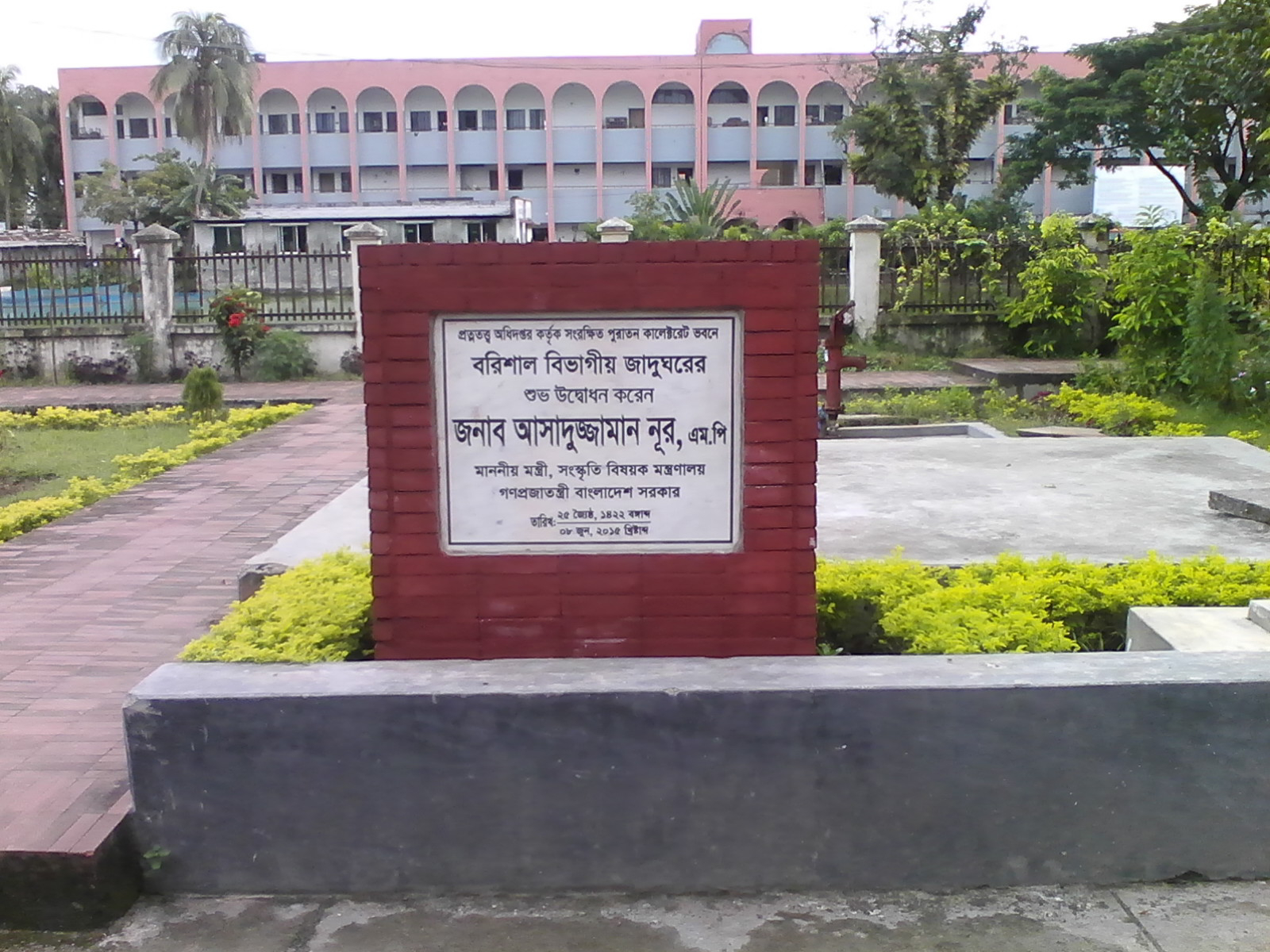
Nameplate

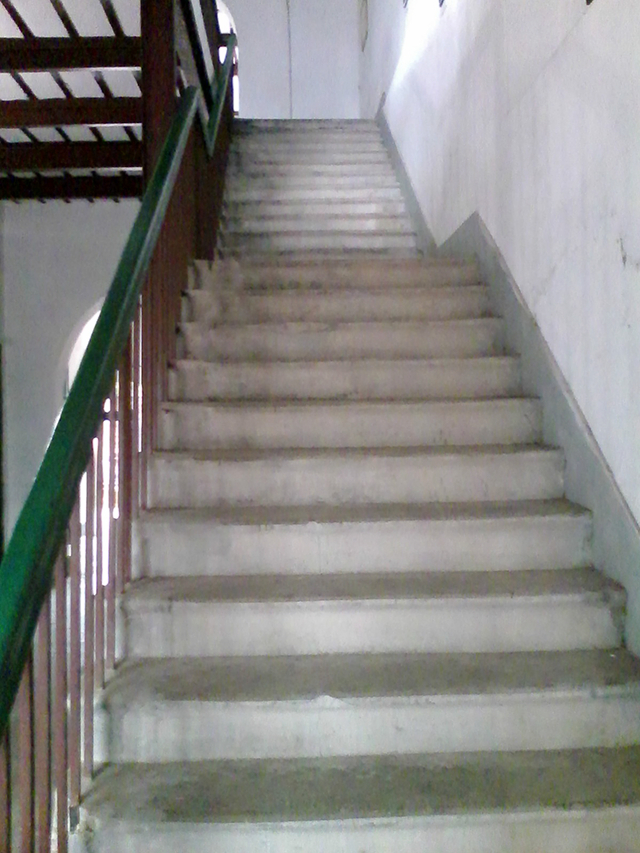
Entrance stairway

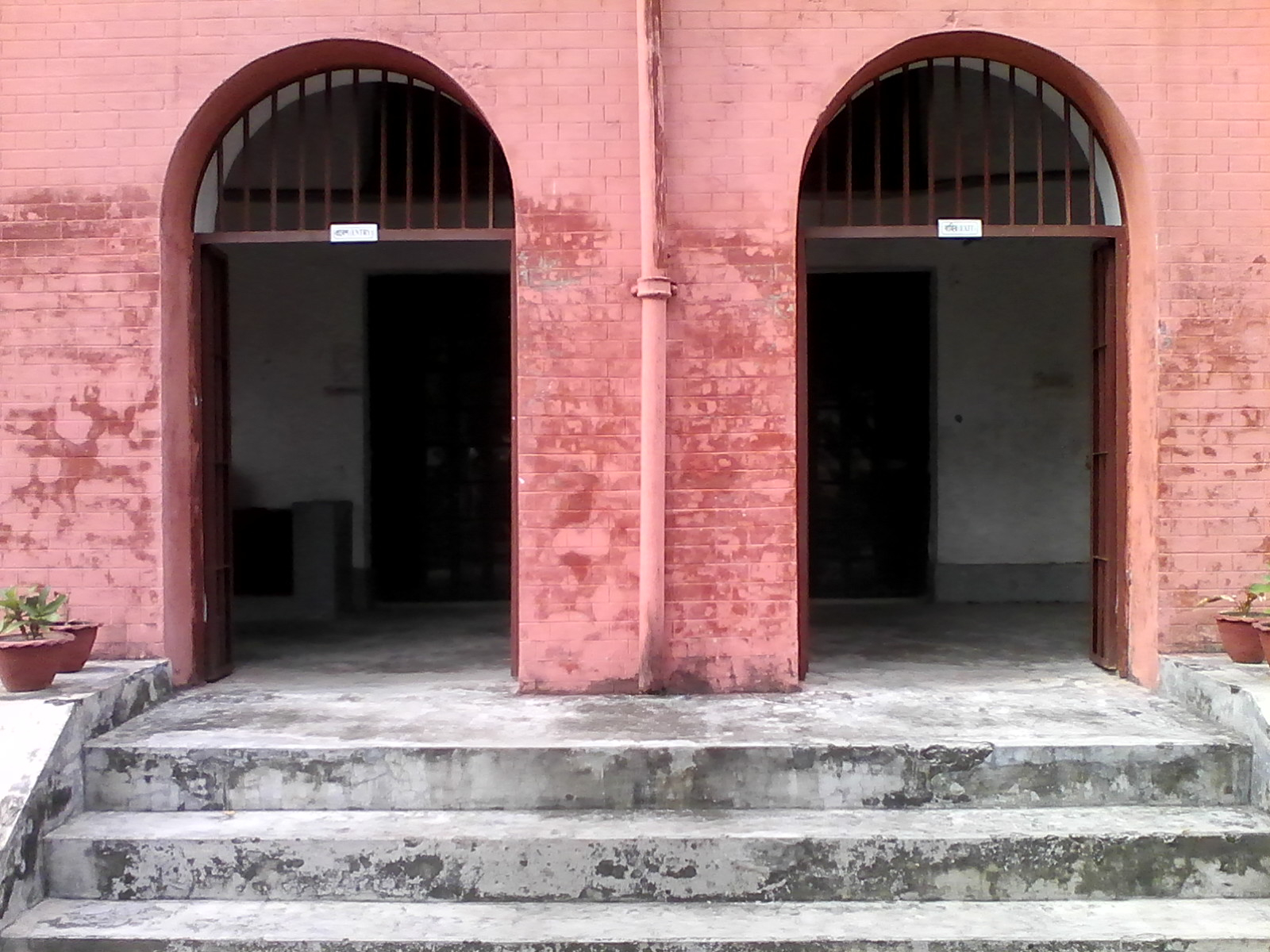
Main entrance

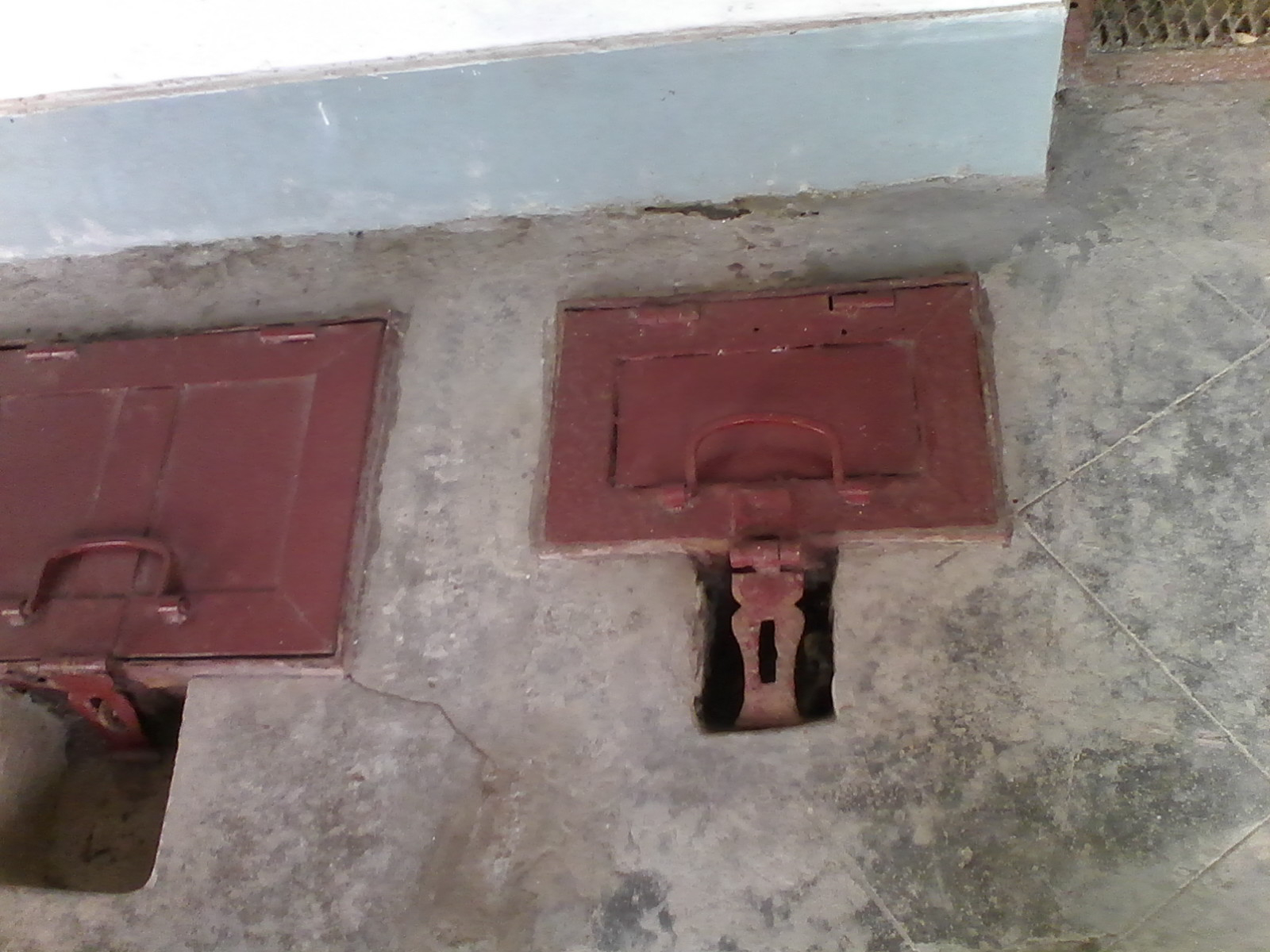
Chest
