= Government Majid Memorial City College =

College in Khulna, Bangladesh

Coordinates: 22.8097°N 89.5628°E

- Other name: MM City College
- Type: Public
- Established: 1965
- Affiliations: National University.
- Academic affiliations: Board of Intermediate and Secondary Education, Jessore
- Principal: Proff. Md. Monirul Islam Sardar
- Location: Khulna, Khulna, Bangladesh
- Website: www.mmcitycollege.edu.bd

Government Majid Memorial City College is a college in Khulna, Bangladesh. The institute was established in the middle of the 19th century. It is beside the Khan Jahan Ali Road, near the "Royal er mor". It is a combined college offering 11th and 12th grades in three major subjects: science, commerce, and arts. MM City College is also offering undergraduate courses in different subjects.

Mr. Shah Mostofa Ahamed Mojid, the founder of this college, was a former member of Parliament and a political icon in Khulna city. He founded this college in 1965. Mr. Md. Ruhul Amin was the founding principal of this college. In the beginning, there were only six students in the college, and its name was 'The Khulna City College'. Mr. Majid died in 1968, and remembering his contribution to society and the college, the Khulna City College was renamed 'Mojid Memorial City College'. In 1993, the College became a government college and again it is renamed to 'Govt. Mojid Memorial City College.'
