= Khulna Public College =

Khulna Public College (KPC)
- খুলনা পাবলিক কলেজ
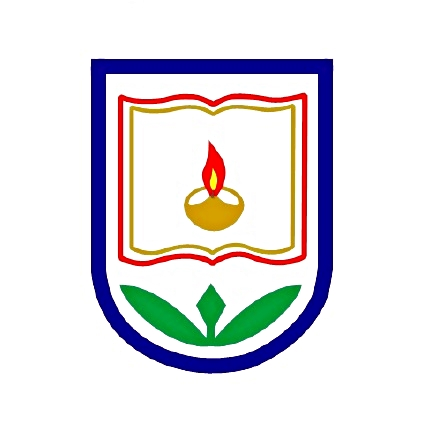
- College Logo

Location
- Jalil Sarani, Boyra; Khulna, 9000; Bangladesh; 22°50′9.2964″N 89°31′57.3273″E

Information
- Type: Autonomous
- Motto: এসো জ্ঞানের সন্ধানে, ফিরে যাও দেশের সেবায়। (Enter in Pursuit of Wisdom, Depart in Service of the Nation)
- Established: 20 January 1987
- Founder: Quazi Azhar Ali, the then Secretary of the Ministry of Education, Government of the People's Republic of Bangladesh
- School board: Jessore Education Board
- Educational authority: Board of Governors, Khulna Public College
- Principal: Lt. Col. Munir Abbas, psc, Infantry (East Bengal) B.A. - 6199
- Staff: 99
- Teaching staff: 175
- Grades: 3 to 12
- Gender: Male
- Enrollment: ~2890
- Language: Bengali
- Hours in school day: Morning Shift: 08.00 am–01:20 pm
- Campus: Boyra, Khulna-9000
- Campus size: 5.3482 acres
- Campus type: Urban
- Houses: 4 (Maroon, Green, Blue & Yellow)
- Colors: Deep Blue, Light Green,
- Sports: Football, Cricket, Basketball, Volleyball, Table tennis, Badminton, handball
- Publication: Protyasha-প্রত্যাশা
- Website: http://kpcbd.edu.bd/

Khulna Public College or KPC (Bengali: খুলনা পাবলিক কলেজ), formerly known as Sundarban Boys' Public School and College, situated in Boyra, Khulna, Bangladesh, is one of the only three (the other two are RUMC and DRMC, based in Dhaka) prestigious autonomous educational institutions nationwide, directly administered by the Ministry of Education. It offers education for 3rd through 12th grade. It is an educational institution only for boys. In 2015, KPC was named The Best Digital Educational Institution of Khulna zone.

== Motto ==
Enter in Pursuit of Wisdom, Depart in Service of the Nation

== Administration ==
The college is governed by a Board of Governors chaired by the Secretary of the Ministry of Education of The People's Republic of Bangladesh. KPC offers education in two shifts: morning shift (8.00 am–12.30 pm) and day shift (1.00 pm–5.30 pm). The head of the college administration is the Principal and there are two Vice Principals in each of the shifts.

=== Board of Governors ===
- President: The Hon'ble Senior Secretary, Secondary and Higher Education Division, Ministry of Education
- Vice-President: The Divisional Commissioner, Khulna Division
- Members:
1. Additional Secretary (Administration), Ministry of Finance
2. Commissioner, Khulna Metropolitan Police
3. Chief Engineer, Education Engineering Department
4. Chairman, Board of Intermediate and Secondary Education, Jessore
5. Director of College & Administration (of the status of Joint Secretary to the Government), Directorate of Secondary and Higher Education
6. Deputy Commissioner-cum-District Collector & District Magistrate, Khulna
7. Representative of the Hon'ble Mayor (of the rank of Deputy Secretary to the Government), Khulna City Corporation
8. Executive Engineer, Education Engineering Department
- Co-opt Member(s):
  - Education-interested Member – Prof. Dr. Shahnewaz Nazimuddin Ahmed, Former Chairman of the Economics Discipline, Khulna University
- Assisting Members:
1. Selected Vice Principal, Khulna Public College
2. Elected Teacher Representatives of Khulna Public College
- Secretary of the Hon'ble Members: The Principal, Khulna Public College

=== Principals of Khulna Public College ===
Serial	Name	Period
1.	Shah Mohammad Zahurul Haq	7 January 1987 to 31 December 1988
2.	K.M. Hasan (In-charge)	1 January 1989 to 6 August 1989
3.	Harunur Rashid	7 August 1989 to 17 June 1990
4.	Mrs. Hasna Banu (In-charge)	18 June 1990 to 30 June 1990
5.	Prof. Harunur Rashid	1 July 1990 to 10 March 1991
6.	Dr. Shafiur Rahman	10 March 1991 to 15 April 1992
7.	Salim Haider Chowdhury (In-charge)	15 April 1992 to 17 May 1992
8.	Prof. Shafiur Rahman	17 May 1992 to 3 January 1993
9.	Prof. Md. Younus	3 January 1993 to 3 March 1993
10.	Md. Tarek	1 March 1994 to 27 September 1997
11.	Md. Lal Mia	27 September 1997 to 22 April 2001
12.	Sk. Syed Ali	22 April 2001 to 20 January 2003
13.	Salim Haider Chowdhury (In-charge)	21 January 2003 to 22 January 2003
14.	Sk. Syed Ali	23 January 2003 to 29 December 2008
15.	Prof. Sk. Syed Ali	30 December 2008 to 14 February 2009
16.	Salim Haider Chowdhury (In-charge)	14 February 2009 to 30 March 2009
17.	Prof. M. Abul Bashar Mollah	31 March 2009 to 30 March 2010
18.	Prof. M. Abul Bashar Mollah	4 March 2010 to 6 September 2010
19.	Salim Haider Chowdhury (In-charge)	6 September 2010 to 3 March 2012
20.	Lt. Col. (Now Brig. Gen. (Retd.)) Kazi Shahabuddin Ahmed, AEC	3 March 2012 to 1 January 2016
21.	Lt. Col.(Now Retd.) Md. Jahangir Alam, AEC	1 February 2016 to 10 April 2019
22.	Lt. Col. (Now Col. (Retd.)) Eare Md. Morshed Alam, M. Phil. PhD. AEC	10 April 2019 to 1 December 2019
23.	Lt. Col. (Now Col.) Abdul Moqtader, AEC	1 December 2019 to 2 January 2023
24.	Lt. Col. Mohammad Shamimul Ahasan Shamim, ASC	2 January 2023 to 5 June 2025
26	Lt. Col. Munir Abbas, psc, Infantry	5 June 2025 to Present

=== Principal ===
Lt. Col. Munir Abbas, psc, Infantry(East Bengal)

BA-6199, Corps: East Bengal Regiment

== Education ==
Khulna Public College offers primary, secondary and higher secondary education in Bengali. After grade 5, students take the Primary Education Completing exam (PEC); after grade 8, they take the Junior School Certificate (JSC); after grade 10, they take the Secondary School Certificate (equivalent to O Levels); and after grade 12 they take the Higher Secondary (School) Certificate (equivalent to the high school diploma in the United States and A Levels).

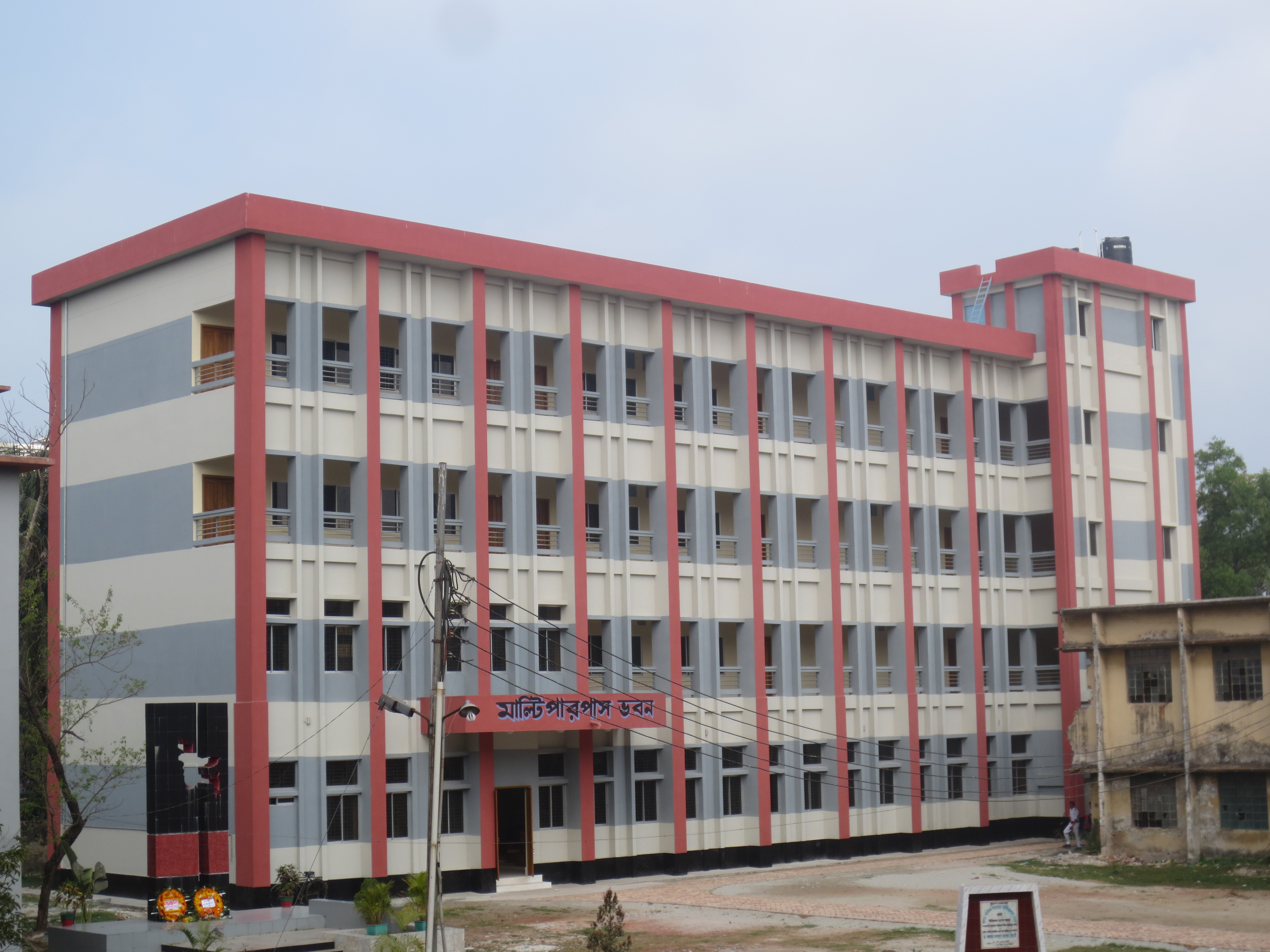
Multipurpose Building of Khulna Public College

=== Curriculum ===
The college follows the national education curriculum of Bangladesh. Classes in computing are compulsory until grade 8. Students of secondary (9 and 10) and higher secondary (11 and 12) classes select one of three major concentrations: Humanities, Business Studies or Science.

=== Academic performance ===
Primary Education Completing (PEC) exam results from 2012 to 2017

Year	Number of Examinees	A+	A	A-	B	C	Percentage of passed students
2012	206	120	65	12	04	05	100%
2013	192	105	64	12	09	02	100%
2014	189	141	34	12	02	00	100%
2015	172	158	14	00	00	00	100%
2016	188	164	18	05	01	00	100%
2017	194	149	44	01	00	00	100%

Junior School Certificate (JSC) exam results from 2012 to 2017

Year	Number of Examinees	Number of Passed students	Percentage of passed students	Obtained GPA-5 or A+
2012	216	216	100%	57
2013	191	191	100%	126
2014	191	189	99%	115
2015	213	213	100%	137
2016	189	189	100%	116
2017	216	216	100%	106

Secondary School Certificate results from 2007 to 2018:

Year	Number of Examinees	Number of Passed students	Percentage of passed students	Obtained GPA-5 or A+
2007	166	166	100%	46
2008	163	163	100%	68
2009	177	170	97%	58
2010	184	184	100%	113
2011	211	211	100%	87
2012	292	292	100%	86
2013	182	182	100%	102
2014	185	185	100%	126
2015	172	172	100%	120
2016	187	187	100%	102
2017	235	235	100%	99
2018	245	245	100%	119

Higher Secondary Certificate results from 2007 to 2012:

Year	Number of Examinees	Number of Passed students	Percentage of passed students	Obtained GPA-5 or A+
2007	406	377	93%	59
2008	450	440	97%	114
2009	389	370	95%	71
2010	438	411	94%	83
2011	405	405	100%	91
2012	435	435	100%	143

== Campus ==
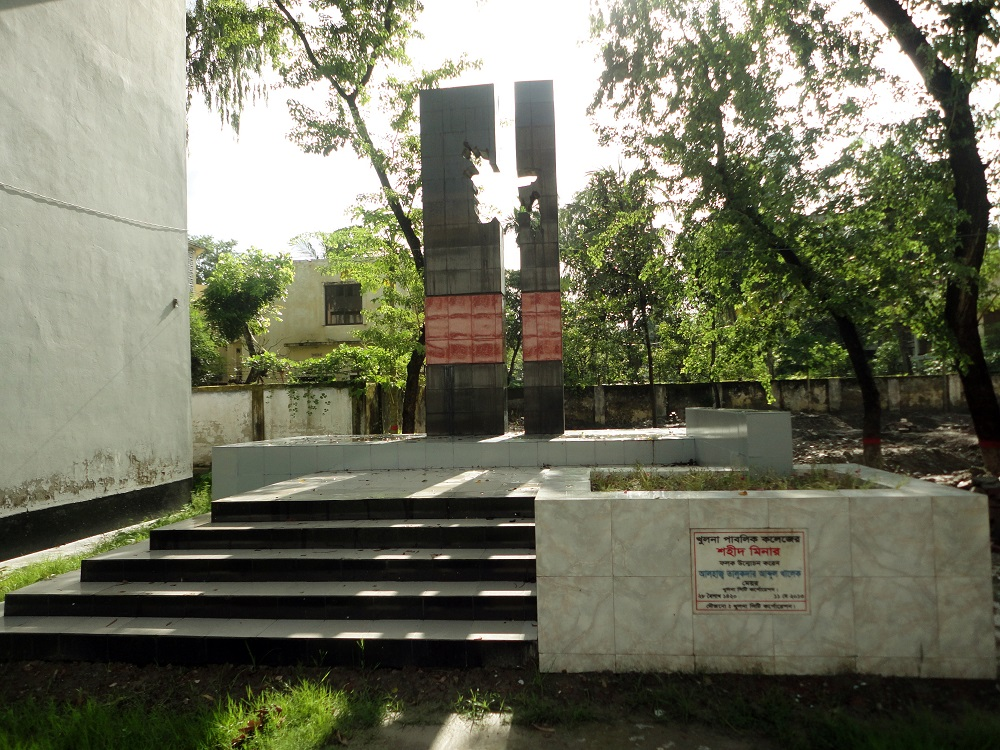
The cenotaph of KPC in memory of the martyrs of the great Liberation War of Bangladesh

Khulna Public College is located on a 5.3482-acre campus in a residential neighbourhood. The campus consists of student dormitories, individual residences for staff, a mosque, academic and administration buildings, gardens, and a playground. The academic buildings include classrooms, a library containing 5,824 volumes, laboratories for biology, chemistry, physics, geography, psychology and a modern computer lab. There is a Shaheed Minar in the college premises which has been sculpted to commemorate the sacrifice of the martyrs of the Language Movement of 1952. This exceptional Shaheed Minar has been designed by architect Al Masum Billah, who is an ex-student of this institution.

== Co-curricular and extra-curricular activities ==
KPC puts special emphasis on literary and cultural activities. A special class named CTP ( Class Teacher's Period ) is held on every Wednesday in every class with a view to publishing the latent talents of the students.

=== Cultural week ===
Every year, the college organizes an annual cultural week having competitions on debate, recitation, music, drama, art, story telling and so on. Talented students are rewarded with attractive gifts and prizes. .

=== Special day celebration ===
The college arranges various programs on International Mother Language Day (21 February), Pohela Boishakh, Independence Day, Victory Day with a view to informing the student about the significance of the days. Beside these, every year KPC day is celebrated on 20 January as it is the establishment day of the college.

=== External competitions ===
Students of KPC participate in Math Olympiad, Biology Olympiad, National Education Week, Creative Talent Hunt etc. competitions to help improve the reputation for the college.

=== Sports ===
Sports is a major focus of college life. Inter-class cricket and football tournaments are held every year. The college also hosts indoor tournaments in the hostels. Sports week is held in January and includes running, long jump, high jump, shot put, and weight throwing, javelin, and discus events.

=== Publications ===
The college publishes an annual magazine, Protyasha (Bengali: প্রত্যাশা; expectations), with special publications to commemorate major events.

== Uniform ==
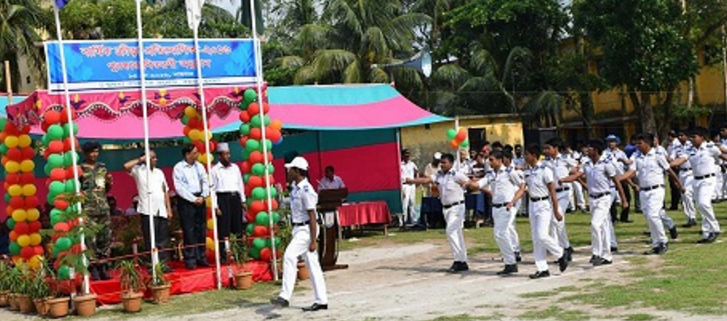
Uniform of the students of KPC

The color white has been a unique symbol for the KPCians. White is the symbol of freshness as well as peace. Student are to wear white shirts and white pants. Belts and shoes should be black in color and white shoes for physical activities. Beside these, the students are given epaulettes for identifying their classes and ID cards, name-tags for personal identification. The epaulettes for grades 3–6 are 1.25-inch wide, and those for grades 7–12 are 1.5-inch wide.

== Silver Jubilee ==
20 January 2012 was the silver jubilee of Khulna Public College and was marked by a reunion.

== 31 Years Celebration and Re-union ==
The 31 year celebration and Re-union festival was held on 19 and 20 January 2018. The campus had been full with present and ex students of KPC. The cultural programs were much enjoyable with Nagarbaul James (musician) and many other artists.

== Photo gallery ==
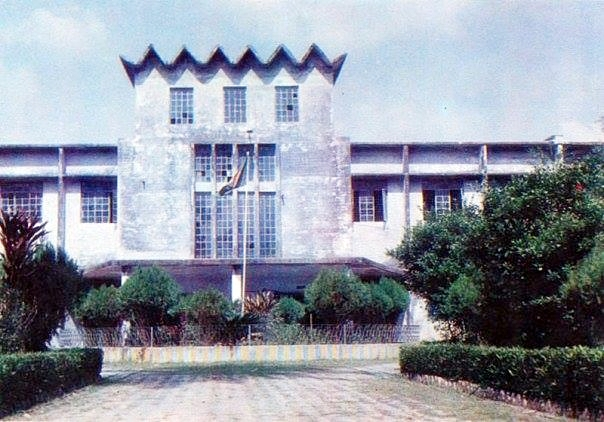
Old academic building of KPC

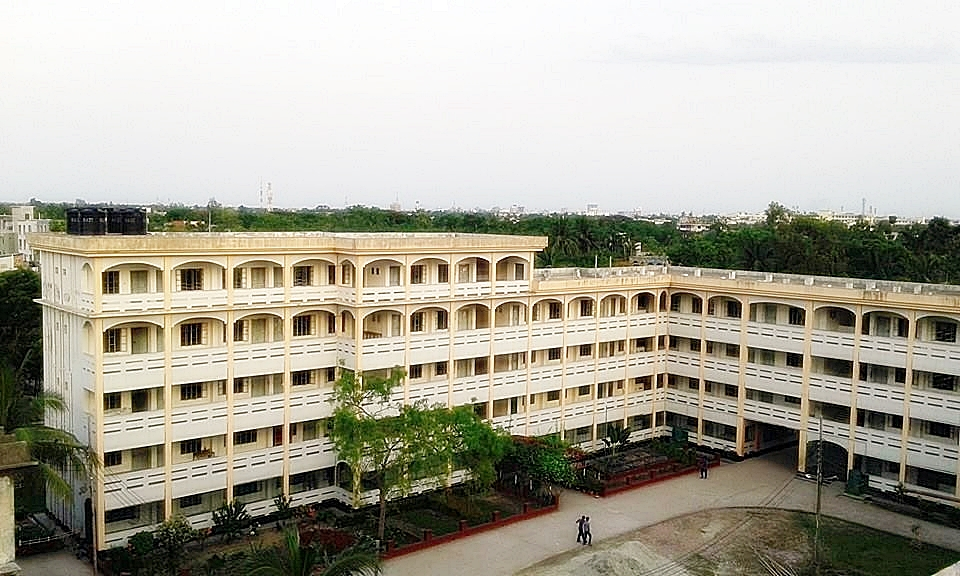
Academic Building

== See also ==
- List of educational institutions in Khulna
