= Jessore Cantonment =

Bangladeshi military cantonment

Coordinates: 23.828240°N 90.388962°E

Jashore Cantonment
- Jessore, Khulna, Bangladesh

Site information
- Type: Cantonment
- Controlled by: Bangladesh Army

Garrison information
- Current commander: Major General J. M. Emdadul Islam

Jashore Cantonment is a cantonment located in the southern part of Bangladesh in Jashore District outside Jashore town and the Headquarters of 55th Infantry Division.

== History ==
Ferdousi Priyabhashini was raped in Jessore Cantonment during Bangladesh Liberation War. It had a prisoner camp were Pakistani army carried out rape, torture, and execution. Jessore Cantonment was captured during Bangladesh Liberation war on 6 December 1971 by the Pine Division of the Indian Army. On 9 March 2009 General Officer Commanding of 55 Infantry Division and Jessore Cantonment Commander Major General Rafiqul Islam was killed in a helicopter crash along with the pilot. In 4 September 2015 a soldier was found dead inside the barracks of the cantonment.

During the 2013- 2014 Bangladesh unrest, allegations arose that Indian military personnel were deployed at Jessore Cantonment. The Bangladesh ministry of Foreign Affairs vehemently denied the allegations.

== Installations of Bangladesh Army ==
- HQ 55th Infantry Division
  - Area Headquarters, Jashore
  - Station Headquarters, Jashore
    - Combined Military Hospital
    - Garrison Engineer (Army)
    - Military Engineering Service (MES)
  - 9th Bengal Lancers Regiment
  - 55th Artillery Brigade
  - 3rd Engineers Regiment
  - 1st Signal Battalion
  - 21st Infantry Brigade
  - 88th Infantry Brigade
  - 105th Infantry Brigade
  - 31st Supply Transport Battalion
  - Division Ordnance Company, Jashore
- Signals Training Centre And School (STCS)

Additionally, there are two field ambulance units, one EME workshop, two field EME workshop, one Military Police Unit and a Field Intelligence Unit.

== Installations of Bangladesh Air Force ==
- BAF Base Matiur Rahman

== Education ==
- Jashore Cantonment College
- Jashore Cantonment High School
- Army Medical College, Jashore (AMCJ)
- BAF Shaheen College, Jessore
- Dawood Public School
- Daud Public College, Jashore
