= Government Barisal College =

Educational Institute of Barishal, Bangladesh

Coordinates: 22.7081°N 90.3663°E

- সরকারি বরিশাল কলেজ
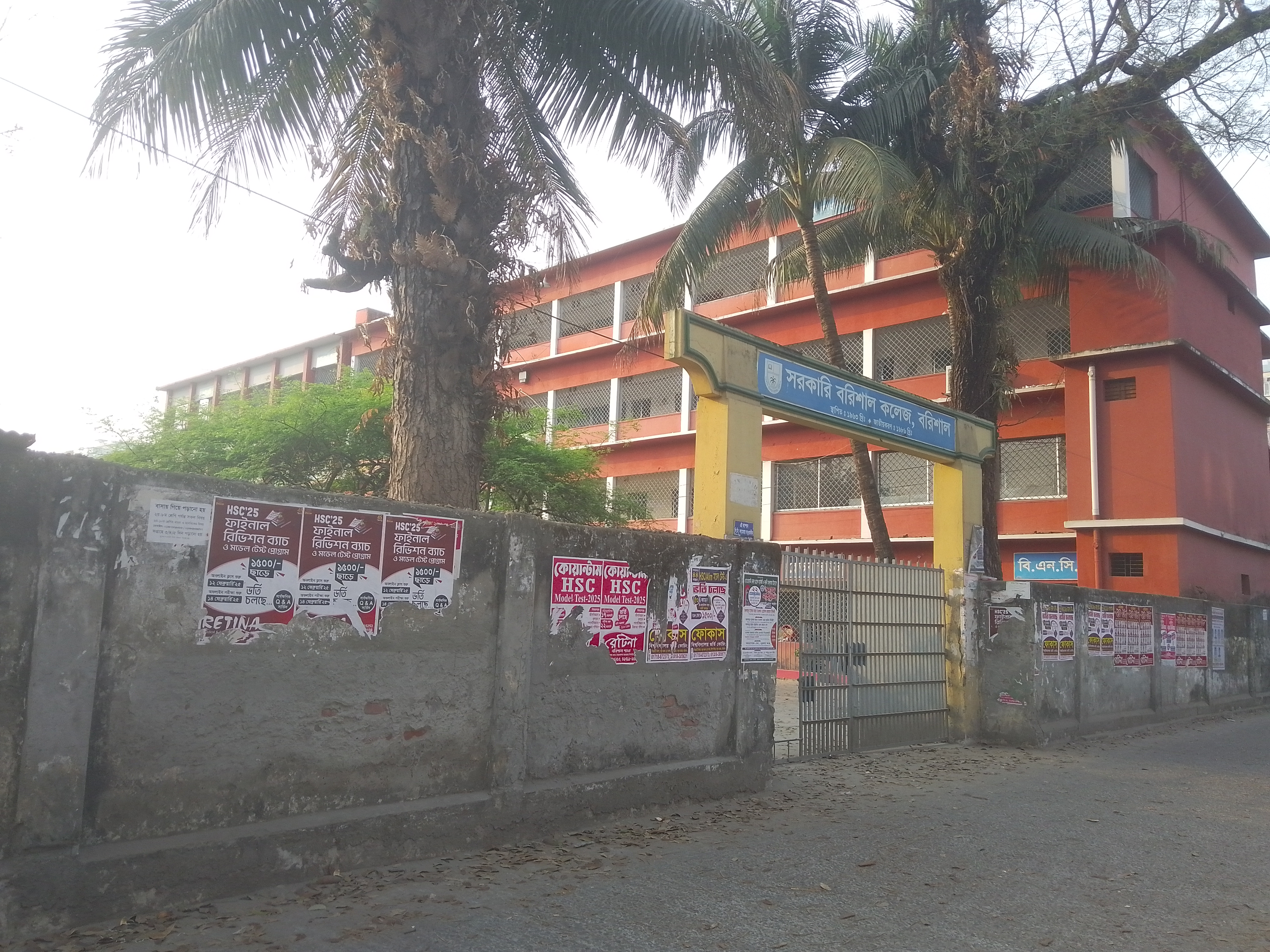
- Type: Government
- Established: 1963; 63 years ago
- Affiliations: National University of Bangladesh
- Academic affiliations: Board of Intermediate and Secondary Education, Barisal; Bangladesh National University
- Principal: Pro. Md. Abbas Uddin Khan
- Students: 3912+
- Location: Barisal, Bangladesh
- Website: www.gbc.gov.bd

Government Barisal College (Bengali: সরকারি বরিশাল কলেজ) is an educational institution of Barisal, Bangladesh. It is a university level college where students can attend bachelor courses in addition to HSC courses.

== History ==
Government Barisal College was established as The Barisal Night College in 1963 by a group of enthusiastic young officers and locals to meet the demand of higher education while pursuing their career. Initially the college started at Brojomohun School with the cooperation of then head master Jayanta Dasgupta. Prof. Abdul Hoque served as the first principal of the college and later Prof. Sirajul Haque took charge of the position. In 1966, the Night College campus transferred to the current location, at the abandoned residence of Mahatma Ashwini Kumar Datta. There is a Tamal tree at the centre of the campus that bears the testimony of many glorious events of history. The college was nationalized in 1986 and the college has been renamed as Government Barisal College .
