= Barisal Government Girls' High School =

Barisal Government Girls High School
- বরিশাল সরকারি বালিকা উচ্চ বিদ্যালয়

Location
- Kabi Jibananda Das Road (East Bagura); Barisal; BD; Barisal, Bangladesh, 8200; 22.7046°N 90.3648°E

Information
- Type: Government sponsored
- Motto: শিক্ষাই আলো (Education is Light)
- Established: 1923; 103 years ago
- School board: Barisal Education Board
- Headmistress: Mahbooba Hossain
- Teaching staff: 53
- Grades: Standard 3 - Standard 10
- Gender: Girls
- Language: বাংলা
- Campus: Urban
- Sports: Handball, Badminton
- Nickname: Sadar Girl's
- Website: www.bgghs.edu.bd

Barisal Government Girls' High School, established in 1923, is one of the oldest schools for girls in Barisal, Bangladesh. In academic year 2012–2014, this institute got The National Award from Ministry of Education (Bangladesh) and Second Best Institute from Board of Intermediate and Secondary Education, Barisal.

== History ==
The school was established in 1923 as Barisal Sadar Girls' School to promote women's education in Barisal. In 1961, it was nationalized.

== See also ==
- Barishal Zilla School
