= Noubahini College, Dhaka =

- নৌবাহিনী কলেজ, ঢাকা
- Logo of Noubahini College Dhaka

Location
- Sailors Colony, Mirpur-14, Dhaka Cantonment, Dhaka; Bangladesh; 23°47′56.12″N 90°23′25.79″E

Information
- Type: School & College
- Motto: শিক্ষাই প্রগতি ("Education is Progress")
- Established: 21 February 1982
- School board: Dhaka Education Board
- Principal: Captain Md Ismail Mazumder, (S), npp, BN
- Grades: Class I to XII
- Gender: Co-education
- Enrollment: 4200
- Language: Bangla & English
- Colors: Blue and white
- Nickname: NCD
- Website: www.bncd.edu.bd

Noubahini College, Dhaka (Bengali: নৌবাহিনী কলেজ, ঢাকা), commonly known by the acronym NCD, is a primary to higher secondary educational institution in Dhaka run by Bangladesh Navy.

== History ==
Noubahini College, Dhaka started its journey as Fahmida Cantonment School on 21 February 1978. It was converted into Bangladesh Navy School Dhaka in 1982. Bangladesh Navy College Dhaka came into being in July 1996 as a separate institution. As per directives of Naval Headquarters, Bangladesh Navy College and School were combined and regarded as a single educational institution in October 1998 and named as Bangladesh Navy College Dhaka. In April 2022, the name of the institution was changed once again, to Noubahini College, Dhaka.

== Clubs ==
Noubahini College, Dhaka, has several extracurricular clubs.

- Navians Debating Society - NDS
- BNCD Photographic Society
- NCD International Co-Curricular & Talent Hunt Club
- Navians General Knowledge Club
