= Azam Khan Government Commerce College =

College in Khulna, Bangladesh

Azam Khan Govt. Commerce College
- আযম খান সরকারি কমার্স কলেজ
- Type: National, coeducational
- Established: 1953 (73 years ago)
- Academic staff: 180
- Students: 9,660
- Location: Khulna, Bangladesh; 22.8122°N 89.5677°E
- Campus: Urban
- Language: Bengali
- Website: akcc.gov.bd

Azam Khan Commerce College is the first Commerce college in Bangladesh. It is located in Upper Jessore Road, Khulna, Bangladesh. It is Higher Secondary Certificate level, three years BBS (Degree Pass) and four years Honors courses including Accounting, Management, Finance & Banking and also Marketing. It is also 2 years for Masters courses in Business faculties. The college is affiliated with the Board of Intermediate and Secondary Education (BISE), Jessore and the National University (NU).

== History ==
Azam Khan Commerce College was established in 1953 as an Intermediate College (night shift) for the commerce students only. In 1954, its added (day shift) for the Degree level. Subsequently, the night shift was closed. The college was named after Governor of East Pakistan General Azam Khan. In 1963, it introduced Honours course in commerce under Rajshahi University. After the emergence of Bangladesh Masters courses in Accounting and Management were introduced in 1972 and two more honours courses in Finance & Banking and Marketing were added in 2004. The college was nationalized in 1979. Its earned name and fame nationwide from the very inception as a specialized higher educational institution for studies.

== See also ==
- List of educational institutions in Khulna
