= Govt. Daulatpur Muhsin High School =

First high school established in Khulna District, Bangladesh

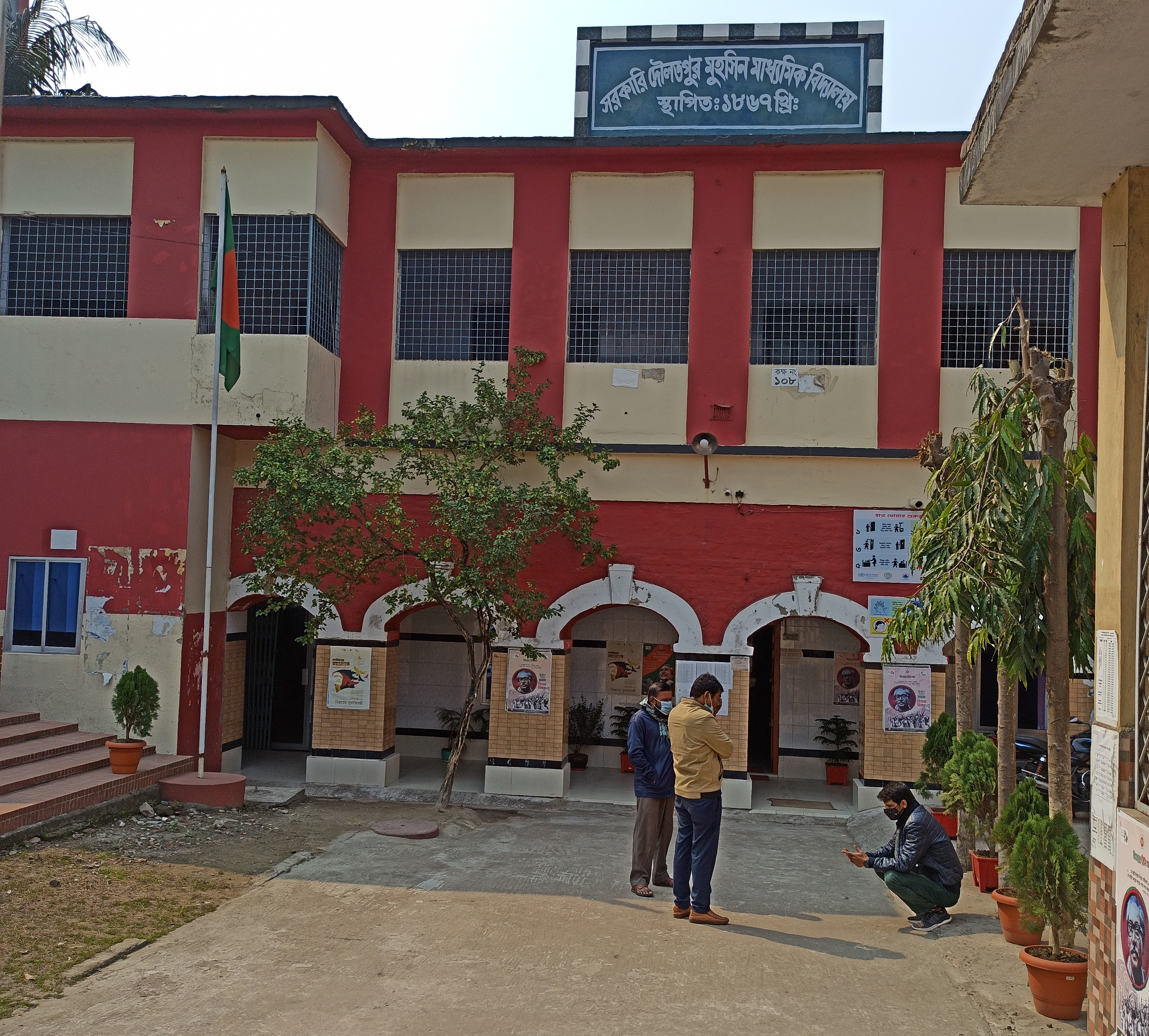
- Front of Govt. Daulatpur Muhsin High School

Location
- Daulatpur, Khulna; Bangladesh; 22.873301°N 89.523319°E

Information
- Type: Public
- Established: 1867 (159 years ago)
- Principal: Shahidul Islam Jowarder
- Faculty: 19
- Grades: 6 to 10
- Enrollment: 973
- Campus size: 3.15 acres
- Sports: Football, cricket, volleyball
- Website: dmhskhulna.edu.bd

Govt. Daulatpur Muhsin High School is the first high school of Khulna District, it is located at Daulatpur, Khulna District, the oldest river port in southern Bengal. The school conducts classes from grade 6 to grade 10 in the science, arts and commerce sections. In 2000, the school had 973 students and 19 teachers, of whom 3 were women. The school has a total of three acres of land and five buildings, of which four are two-storied and other is one-storied. It has two playgrounds. It continues to maintain its tradition of performing well in public examinations.

== History ==
The school was established with the support & great contribution of Hazi Mohammad Mohsin. The greater part of his zamindari estates were in this district. The management office of the Saidpur Trust Estate comprising Saidpur, Shovana and Charbhadra of the district was at Daulatpur. Manager of this estate, Babu Khetragopal Bandyopadhyay, planned the establishment of the school and sought help of the deputy collector, Babu Brahmanath Som, who was also the officer in charge of the estate. The school was established on 2 February 1867. Initially, it was a minor school and was named Daulatpur-Saidpur Trust Estate School. Later, the name was changed to Daulatpur Minor School. Babu Abhayakumar Sen was appointed its first headmaster. In 1870, 13 students from this school appeared in the Medium English Final Examinations and 12 passed. Students of the school continued to perform well in examinations and in recognition, the school was upgraded to a High English School in February 1875. On that time Muslim students were very few in number and management decided to open a Madrasa section. It was well appreciated and good number of Muslim students are attracted to the school.

The school was nationalized in 2016.

== Environment & facilities ==
Govt. Daulatpur Muhsin High School is on total of 3 acres of land. There are four two-storied and one one-storied building as class room, here also a small tin shed hostel for residential support of student. The school conducted classes 6-10 grade. Here Science, Arts and Commerce faculty are available. According to the last education board report the school had 973 students and 19 teachers including 3 were women.

== Alumni ==
- AAMS Arefin Siddique, Vice-Chancellor of the University of Dhaka (2009–2017)
