= Bangladesh Noubahini School and College, Chattogram =

Private school and college in Bangladesh

- বাংলাদেশ নৌবাহিনী স্কুল ও কলেজ, চট্টগ্রাম
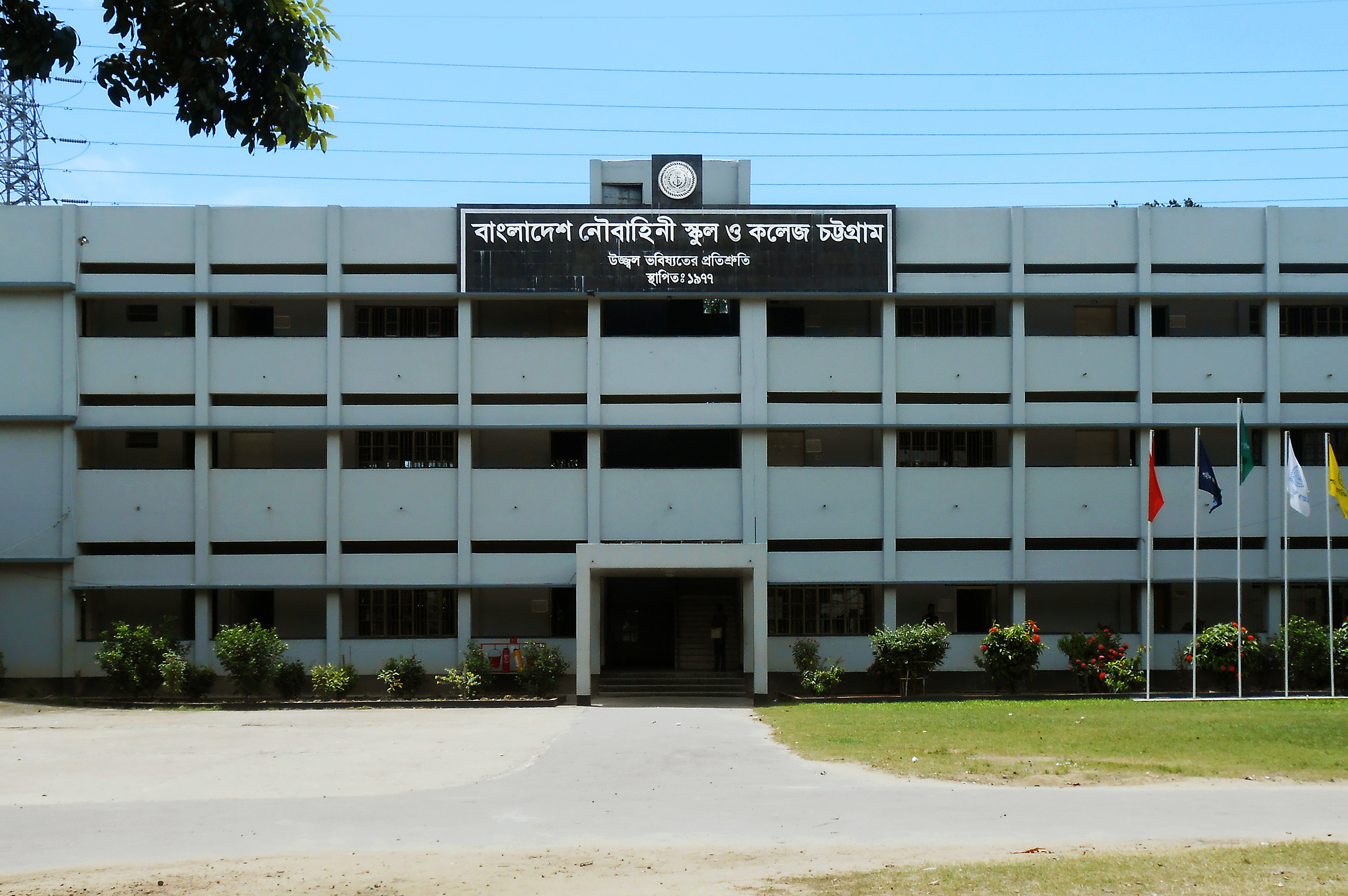
- BN School and College building

Location
- Sailors Residential Area 1, CEPZ, Bandar Thana, Chittagong; Bangladesh; 22.2910°N 91.7802°E

Information
- Type: Autonomous
- Motto: শিক্ষাই প্রগতি এবং উন্নতি (Education is Progress)
- Established: 1977
- School district: Chittagong
- Chairman: Rear Admiral Md Moinul Hassan, NBP, BSP, BCGM, ndc, ncc, psc
- Principal: Capt M Habibul Moula,(ND),PSC,BN
- Faculty: 75+
- Enrollment: 7500+
- Language: Bengali, English
- Colors: Blue and white
- Website: https://navycollegectg.edu.bd/

Bangladesh Noubahini School and College, Chattogram, is a private primary, secondary and higher secondary school in Chittagong, Bangladesh, which is run by the Bangladesh Navy. It is located at Sailors Residential Area 1, Bandar, Chittagong.

== History ==
In 1977, the institute was founded in Chittagong as a junior secondary school of the Bangladesh Navy with only about sixty students. It was upgraded to a high school in 1978, and upgraded to a school and college in 1990.
