= Govt. Sundarban Adarsha College, Khulna =

####

Government Sundarbans Adarsh College
- Type: Public university
- Established: 1 July 1989
- Affiliations: National University, Bangladesh
- Location: Khulna, Khulna, Bangladesh; 22.8044°N 89.5725°E
- Campus: City
- Nickname: Sundarbans College
- Website: govtsundarbanadarshacollegekhulna.jessoreboard.gov.bd

Government Sundarban Adarsha College is an educational institution located in the Khulna District of Bangladesh which was established on 1 July 1989. The college is currently imparting education at higher secondary, undergraduate, and postgraduate levels under the Jessore Board of Education and National University.

== History ==
Sundarban Adarsh Mahavidyalaya was established in 1989 on the campus of City Law College, Ahsan Ahmed Road, Khulna. The founding head of the college was Babu Pramath Nath Biswas. Its campus was shifted to its own land adjacent to Khanjahan Ali Road in 1971. At present, its campus area is 0.60 acres. The college was declared nationalized on 25 November 1991 and nationalized on 19 August 1993.
