= Barisal =

City in Bangladesh

Barisal বরিশাল (Bengali)
- Metropolis
- Barishal
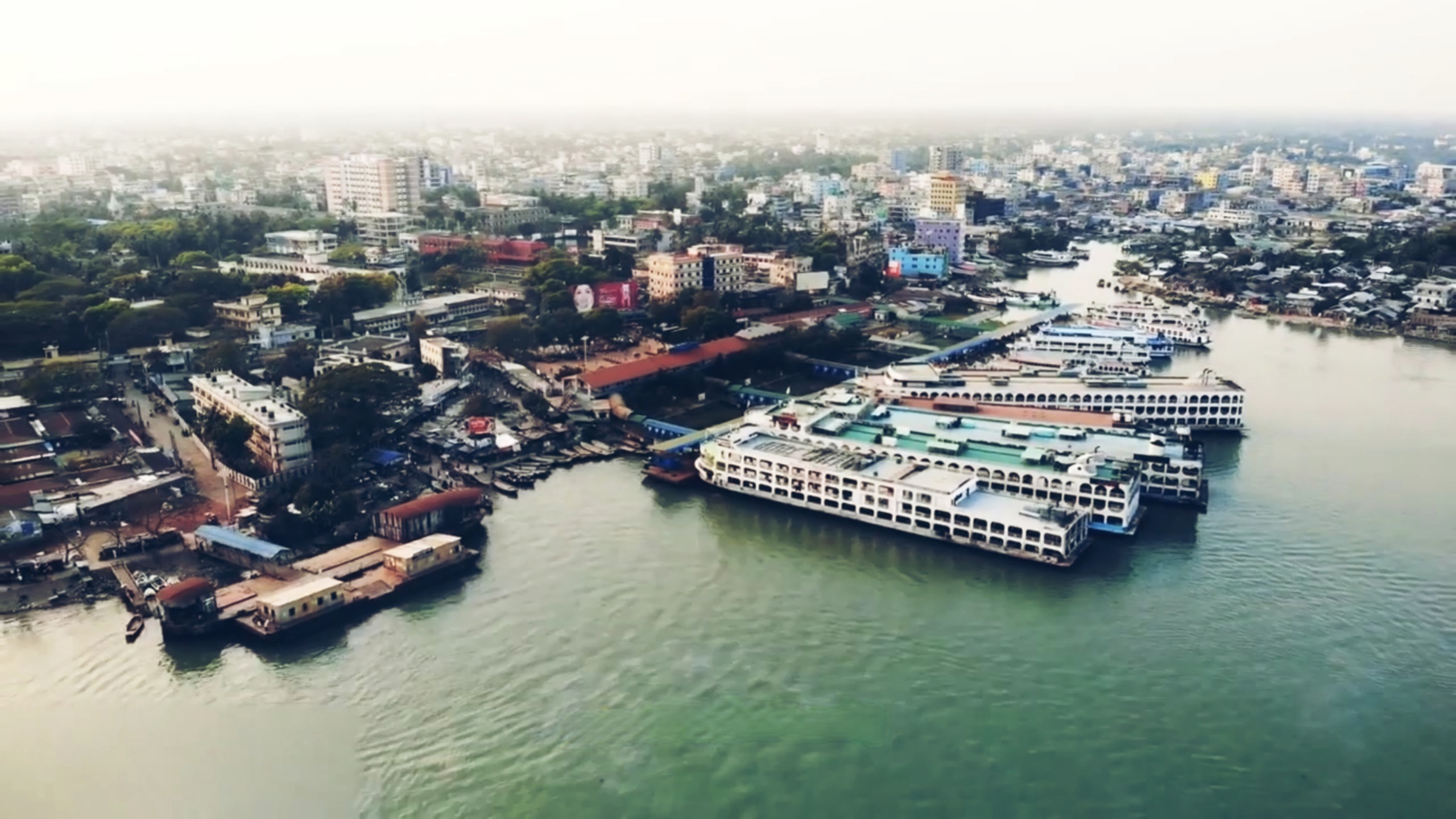
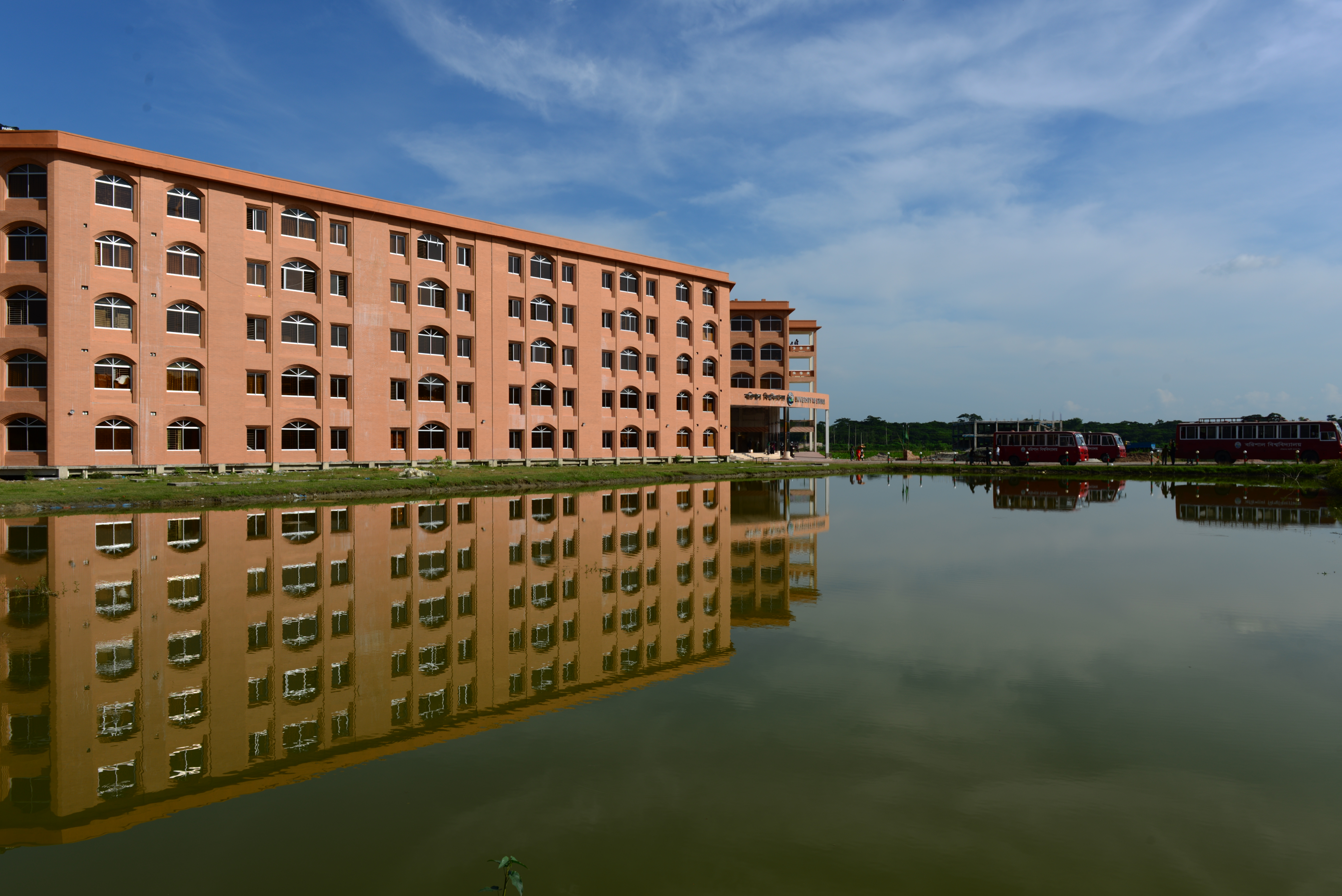
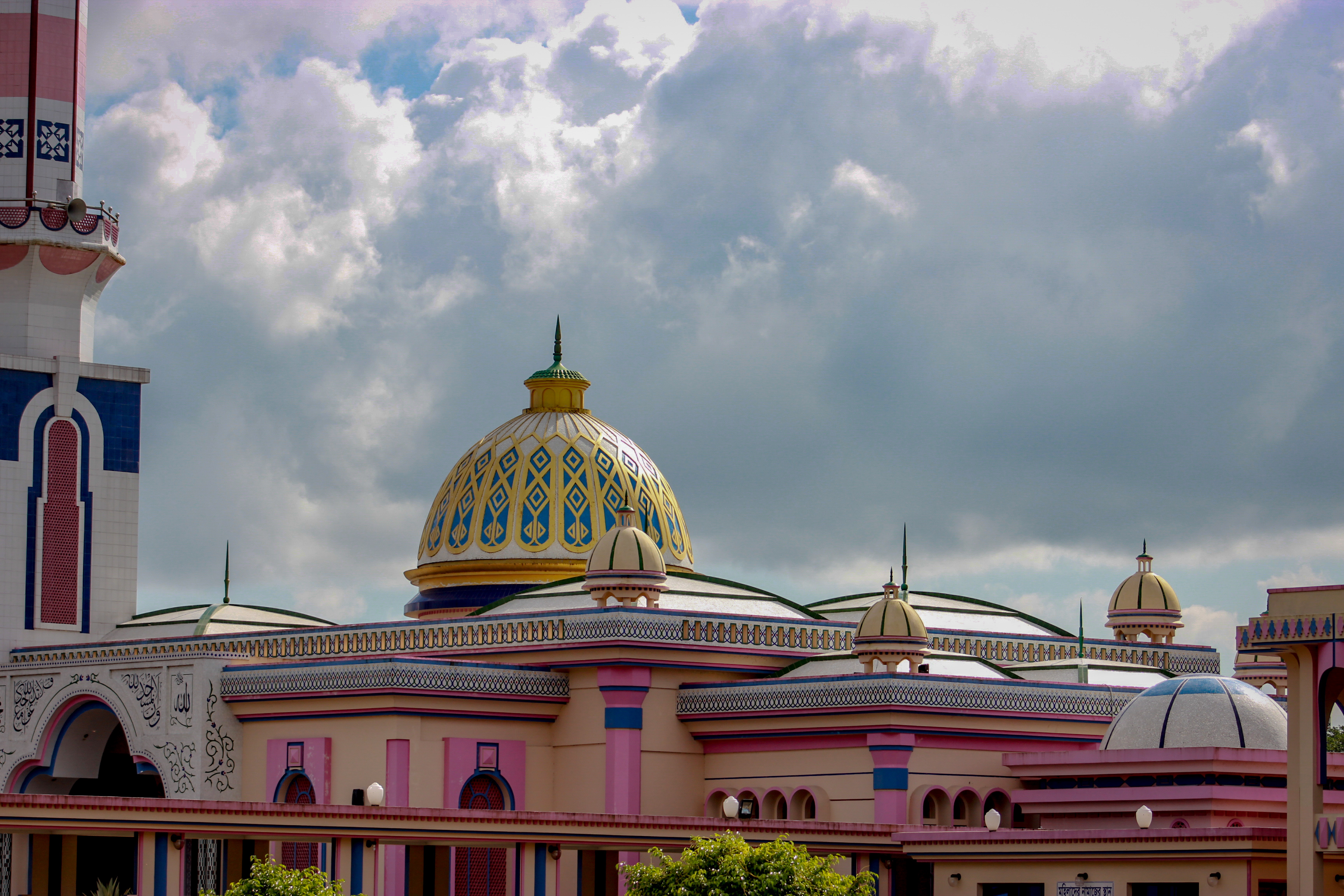
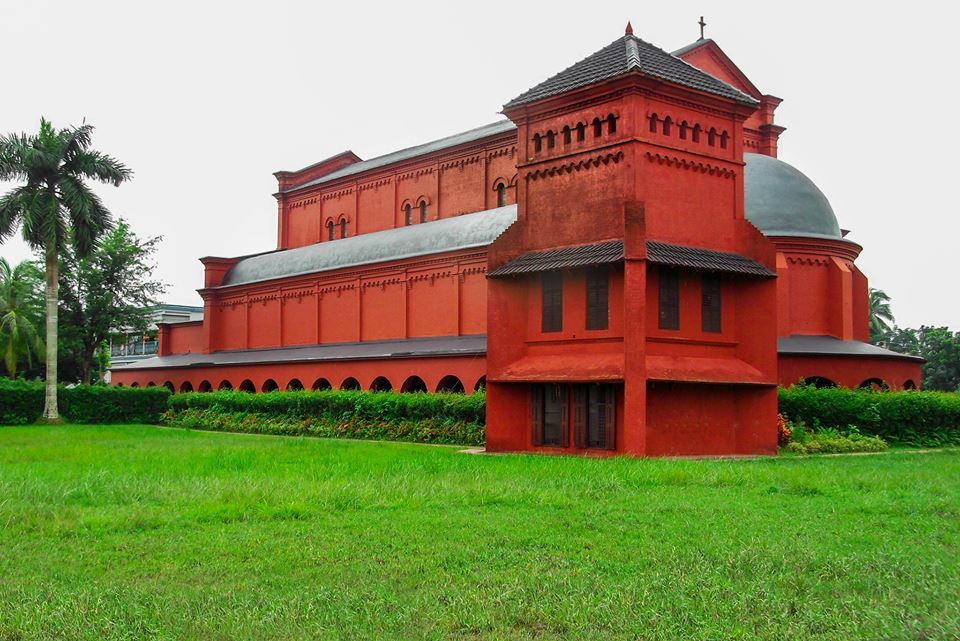
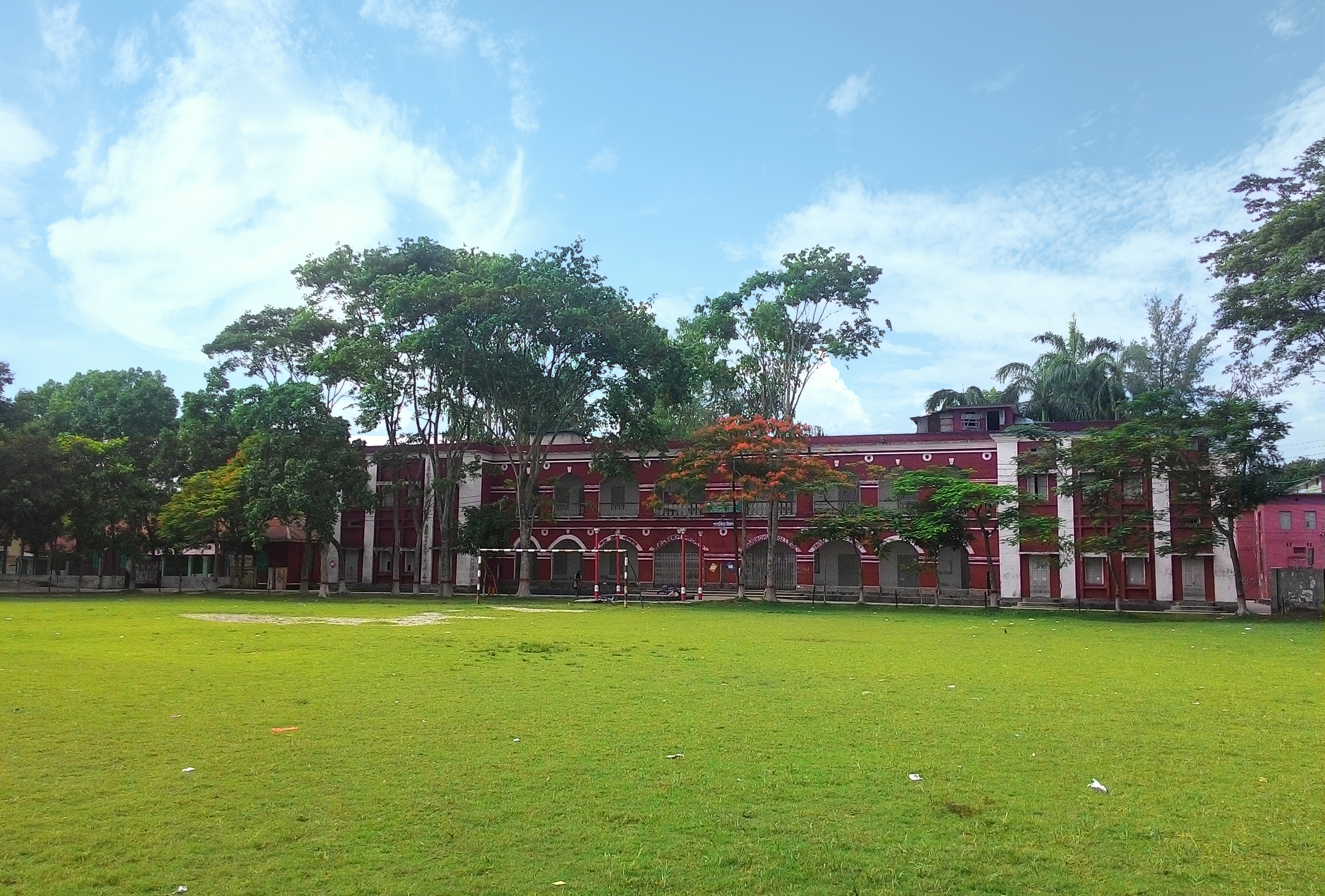
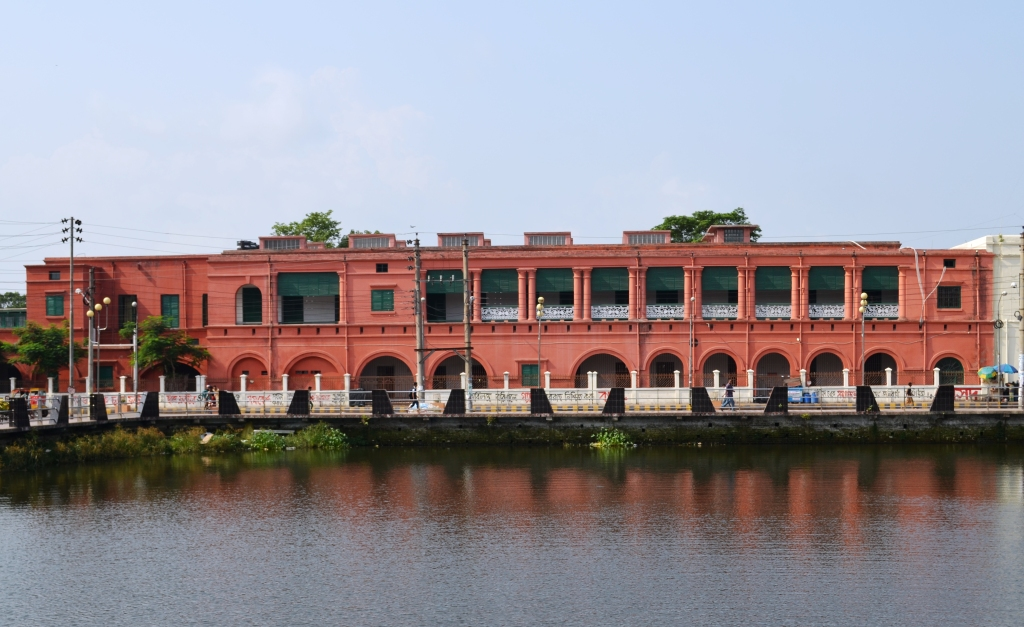
- From top: Barisal Launch Terminal, University of Barisal, Guthia Mosque, Oxford Mission Church, Brojomohun College, Barisal Museum
- Nickname: Venice of the East

- Location of Barisal in Bangladesh Barisal (Bangladesh)
- Coordinates: 22.710°N 90.363°E
- Country: Bangladesh
- Division: Barisal Division
- District: Barisal District
- Municipality established: 1876; 150 years ago
- City Corporation: 2002; 24 years ago
- Granted city status: 19 April 2001

Government
  - Type: Mayor–Council
  - Body: Barishal City Corporation
  - Administrator: Bilkis Akhtar Jahan Shirin
  - City Council: 30 constituencies
  - Parliament: 1 constituencies

Area
  - Urban: 58 km^{2} (22 sq mi)
  - Metro: 69.61 km^{2} (26.88 sq mi)
- Elevation: 5 m (16 ft)

Population (2022)
  - Urban: 419,484
  - Urban density: 7,200/km^{2} (19,000/sq mi)
  - Metro: 448,152
  - Metro density: 6,438/km^{2} (16,670/sq mi)
  - Rank: 10th in Bangladesh
- Demonym(s): Barishali, Barishailla

Languages
  - Official: Bengali • English
  - Regional: Eastern Bengali dialects
- Time zone: UTC+6 (Bangladesh Time)
- Postal code: 8200
- Police: Barisal Metropolitan Police
- Website: barishalcity.gov.bd

Barisal (/ˌbʌrəˈsɑːl/ or /ˈbærəˌsɔːl/; Bengali: বরিশাল, pronounced [boɾiʃal]), (Note: Transcribed bôrishal, or transliterated ISO 15919: bariśāl. Pronounced [boɾiʃal] or [bɔɾiʃal].) officially known as Barishal, is a major city that lies on the banks of the Kirtankhola River in south-central Bangladesh. It is the largest city and the administrative headquarter of both Barisal District (Note: Spelling of the district name in Latin script was officially changed from Barisal to Barishal in April 2018.) and Barisal Division. It is one of the oldest municipalities and river ports of the country. The city was once called the Venice of the East or the Venice of Bengal. Barishal is known for its extensive network of rivers and waterways, which play a crucial role in local transportation.

Barisal municipality was established in 1876 during the British rule in India and upgraded to City Corporation on 25 July 2002. The city consists of 30 wards and 50 mahallas with a population of 533,000, according to the 2023 national census, and about 250,000 voters, according to the 2018 voter list of the city election. The area of the city is 58 km^{2}.

== Etymology ==
The toponym Barisal is etymologically derived from the Perso-Arabic phrase "Bahr-e-Sawal," translating to "the ship of questions". This appellation is rooted in the interactions of Semitic Arab maritime traders, who, in their nautical endeavours, referred to their sea-bound merchant vessels as bahr, which has endured as a term in the lexicon of the Bengali language to this day. The perilous and turbulent waters of Bengal's southern seacoast, notorious for their treacherous waves, presented a hazardous maritime route. As such, upon encountering this tempestuous stretch of coastline, the Arab traders would often be prompted to pose various queries (sawal) regarding the safety, conditions, and navigability of the route. Over time, this word was corrupted to the name Barisal.

== History ==
=== Ancient and medieval eras ===
The Barisal region, situated within the Bengal delta, originated from the long-term sediment deposition of the Padma (Ganges), Jamuna (Brahmaputra), and Meghna rivers. These rivers transported vast quantities of sediment from the Himalayas, gradually forming fertile alluvial soil over millennia through the processes of fluvial aggradation and tidal action. This geological process, which began distinctly in the post-Miocene epoch amid the collision of the Indo-Eurasian plate, rendered the region suitable for early agrarian settlements reliant on monsoon rain-fed rice cultivation and floodplain fisheries.

Evidence of settlement in this region dates back to prehistoric times, with mound-based villages (known locally as 'basal' or 'chal') indicating organized societies from the late Holocene epoch. The region was part of the ancient Gangaridai kingdom, which is mentioned in Greco-Roman accounts such as those by Megasthenes, Pliny the Elder, and Ptolemy from approximately 300 BCE to 150 CE as a formidable deltaic state. This kingdom was reportedly capable of assembling 20,000 cavalry, 200,000 infantry, and 4,000 war elephants, a force that deterred the advance of the Seleucids in the era following Alexander. Direct archaeological excavation in Barisal is rare; evidence largely relies on artifacts found in the greater Vanga-Samatata region, such as punch-marked coins, which testify to economic integration during the Mauryan period (circa 300 BCE).

In the medieval period, Barisal, which encompassed the ancient regions of Chandradvipa and Bakla, was incorporated into the Bengal Sultanate following Muhammad bin Bakhtiyar Khalji's conquest of East Bengal in 1204 CE. This marked a transition from the Buddhist-Hindu polities under the Sena dynasty to Muslim rule under the suzerainty of Delhi. In 1342 CE, an independent sultanate was established through the unification achieved by Shamsuddin Ilyas Shah.

=== Colonial era ===
In 1797, the Bakerganj District, which encompassed Barisal, was established as part of the Bengal Presidency under British administration. Its headquarters was relocated to Barisal in 1801 to capitalize on the area's strategic riverine location for administration and commerce. Barisal was formally incorporated as a municipality in 1876. Barisal's population grew significantly toward the end of the nineteenth century, reaching approximately 19,000 by the early 1900s.

British engineering initiatives, such as constructing embankments on the Kirtankhola River and enhancing river navigation, mitigated seasonal flooding and improved communication links with Calcutta. But revenue collection prioritized imperial necessities over local welfare - research indicates such disproportionate benefits.

In the early twentieth century, Barisal became a focal point for emerging nationalist activity, particularly during the Swadeshi movement protesting the 1905 Partition of Bengal. Local newspapers and intellectuals of the time organized against British economic policies that prioritized jute exports, promoting indigenous enterprise and fostering anti-colonial sentiment.

=== Post-independence developments ===
Following the partition of British India on 14 August 1947, Barisal was incorporated into East Pakistan, part of the newly formed Dominion of Pakistan. It was initially administered under the Bakerganj district structure inherited from the colonial period. The region faced ongoing challenges, including regional disparities such as limited infrastructure investment compared to West Pakistan.

During the 1971 Bangladesh Liberation War, Barisal experienced direct military conflict, including Pakistan's 'Operation Barisal'. This was a naval assault launched in late April to recapture the city, after initial Bengali resistance had established it as a liberated zone until 25 April. The area was under Sector 9 of the Mukti Bahini (Liberation Force), commanded by Major M. A. Jalil (17 July to 24 December 1971). This sector comprised Barisal, Patuakhali, and parts of the Khulna and Faridpur districts, where guerrilla operations and river patrols disrupted Pakistani supply lines. Following independence on 16 December 1971, the region suffered extensive infrastructural damage and significant civilian displacement. Reconstruction efforts commenced with assistance from international donors.

On 1 January 1993, the Barisal Division was established. The region was bifurcated from the Khulna Division to include the Barisal, Bhola, Patuakhali, Jhalokati, Barguna, and Pirojpur districts.

Throughout the 2000s, the Barisal Division faced recurrent threats from cyclones. On 15 November 2007, Cyclone Sidr wrought extensive devastation in coastal districts such as Bhola and Barguna, leading to outbreaks of diarrhea and skin diseases due to flooding and the collapse of sanitation systems. Supported by organizations like the World Food Programme, recovery efforts provided over 100,000 vulnerable families with new homes and livelihood grants by 2009.

== Demographics ==
Historical population

Year	Pop.	±% p.a.
1872	12,501	—
1891	15,482	+1.13%
1901	18,978	+2.06%
1911	22,473	+1.70%
1921	26,744	+1.76%
1931	35,716	+2.94%
1931	61,316	+inf%

Year	Pop.	±% p.a.
1951	89,694	+1.92%
1961	69,936	−2.46%
1974	98,127	+2.64%
1991	142,098	+2.20%
2001	224,389	+4.67%
2011	328,278	+3.88%
2022	576,927	+5.26%

As of 2022 census results, Barisal City Corporation had 105,200 households and a population of 419,484. 16.19% of the population was under 10 years of age. Barisal had a literacy rate of 88.90% for those 7 years and older and a sex ratio of 103.87 males per 100 females.

Most people in Barisal are Bengalis, the majority ethnic group in Bangladesh. The long-standing Bengali inhabitants of the city are known as the demonym Barisaliya and the most spoken Bengali dialect of this region is known as Eastern Bengali. Apart from them, the city population is composed of people from neighboring upazilas and districts (Patuakhali, Bhola, Pirojpur, Jhalakati, Barguna).

Religions in Barisal City Corp. (2022)
Religion	Percent
Islam	90.36%
Hinduism	9.01%
Christianity	0.61%
Other or not stated	0.02%

The majority of Barisal's people are Muslims (90.36%), mainly Sunni Islam of the Hanafi school. Other religious groups include Hindus (9.01%), and very few numbers of other religions, mainly Christians (0.61%) and Buddhists (0.01%).

Since 2015, the Catholic minority has had its own Roman Catholic Diocese of Barisal.

== Geography ==
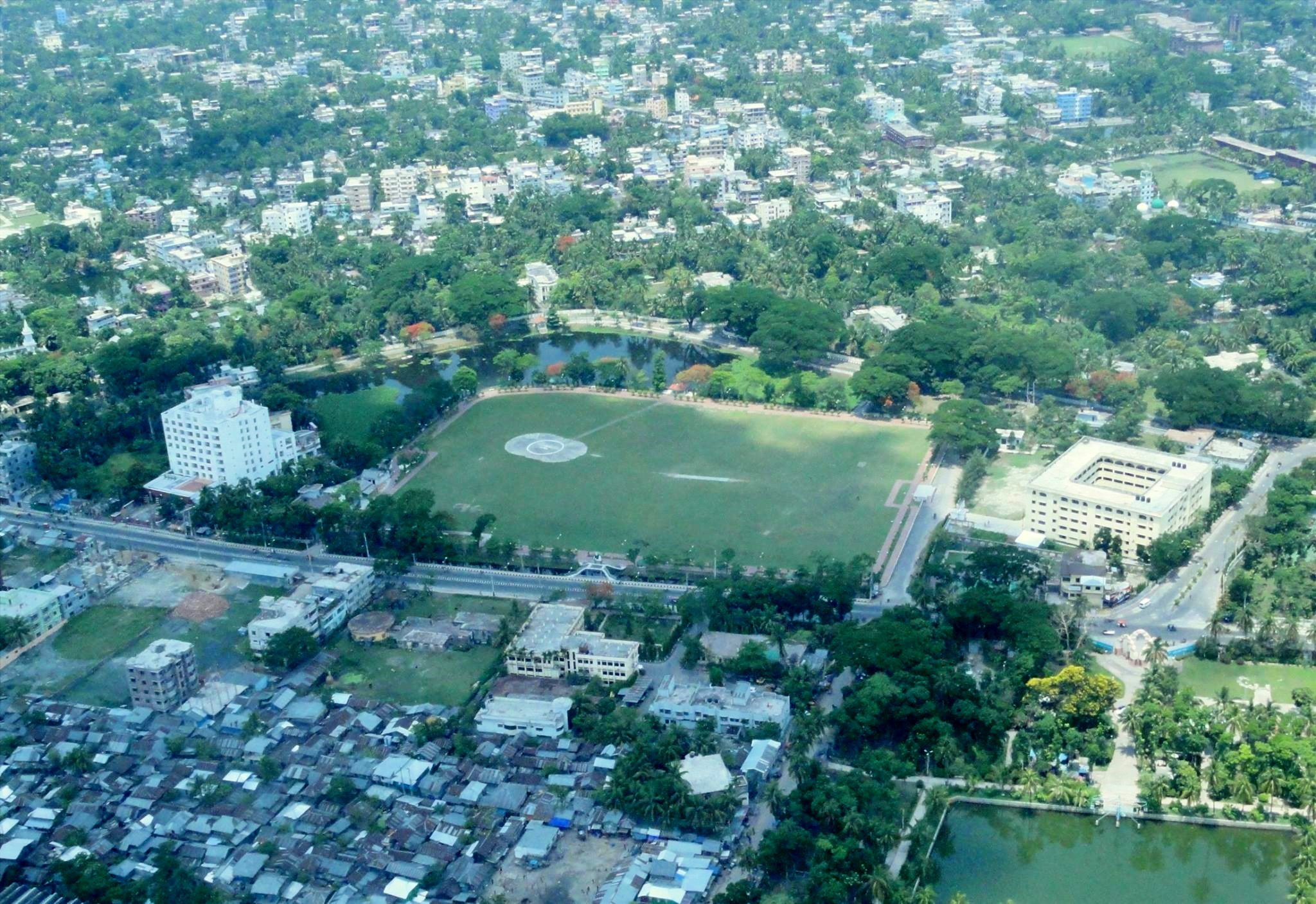
Barisal City aerial view

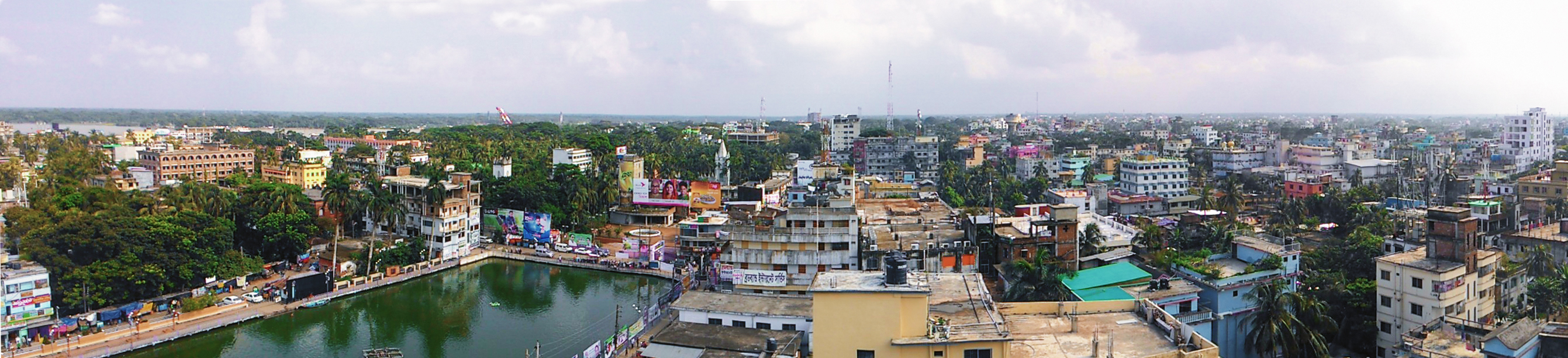
Barisal Cityscape, 2015

Barisal city occupies an area of 58 km^{2}.

Barisal District, with an area of 2790.51 km^{2}, is bounded by Madaripur, Shariatpur, Chandpur, and Lakshmipur districts on the north; Patuakhali, Barguna, and Jhalokati District on the south; Bhola and Lakshmipur districts on the east; and Jhalokati, Pirojpur, and Gopalganj districts on the west. Several rivers flow across Barisal, including the Kirtankhola, Arial Khan, Khoyrabad, Kalijira, and Sandha.

== Climate ==
Barisal has a climate on the border between a dry-winter humid subtropical climate (Köppen Cwa) and a tropical savanna climate (Aw).

Climate data for Barisal (1991–2020 normals, extremes 1883–present)
Month	Jan	Feb	Mar	Apr	May	Jun	Jul	Aug	Sep	Oct	Nov	Dec	Year
Record high °C (°F)	31.0 (87.8)	35.6 (96.1)	38.0 (100.4)	43.6 (110.5)	37.5 (99.5)	37.0 (98.6)	36.5 (97.7)	36.8 (98.2)	37.3 (99.1)	35.8 (96.4)	34.0 (93.2)	31.5 (88.7)	43.6 (110.5)
Mean daily maximum °C (°F)	25.4 (77.7)	28.8 (83.8)	32.5 (90.5)	33.7 (92.7)	33.6 (92.5)	32.4 (90.3)	31.4 (88.5)	31.6 (88.9)	32.0 (89.6)	31.9 (89.4)	29.9 (85.8)	26.7 (80.1)	30.8 (87.4)
Daily mean °C (°F)	17.6 (63.7)	21.4 (70.5)	25.9 (78.6)	28.4 (83.1)	29.0 (84.2)	28.8 (83.8)	28.3 (82.9)	28.4 (83.1)	28.3 (82.9)	27.2 (81.0)	23.5 (74.3)	19.1 (66.4)	25.5 (77.9)
Mean daily minimum °C (°F)	11.8 (53.2)	15.4 (59.7)	20.5 (68.9)	23.9 (75.0)	25.1 (77.2)	26.0 (78.8)	25.9 (78.6)	26.0 (78.8)	25.6 (78.1)	23.9 (75.0)	18.9 (66.0)	13.8 (56.8)	21.4 (70.5)
Record low °C (°F)	5.0 (41.0)	8.5 (47.3)	11.5 (52.7)	17.0 (62.6)	18.4 (65.1)	21.6 (70.9)	20.0 (68.0)	20.0 (68.0)	21.5 (70.7)	16.6 (61.9)	13.0 (55.4)	6.5 (43.7)	5.0 (41.0)
Average precipitation mm (inches)	12.0 (0.47)	21.0 (0.83)	45.0 (1.77)	101.0 (3.98)	210.0 (8.27)	380.0 (14.96)	423.0 (16.65)	334.0 (13.15)	288.0 (11.34)	190.0 (7.48)	47.0 (1.85)	6.0 (0.24)	2,057 (80.98)
Average precipitation days (≥ 1.0 mm)	1.0	2.0	3.0	6.0	11.0	18.0	24.0	23.0	18.0	10.0	2.0	1.0	119.0
Average relative humidity (%)	81	78	76	80	83	88	90	89	89	87	84	83	84
Mean monthly sunshine hours	218.9	223.1	241.1	233.3	214.5	144.7	130.9	145.6	151.8	214.9	230.6	212.9	2,362.3
Source 1: NOAA
Source 2: Bangladesh Meteorological Department (humidity 1981–2010)

== Points of interest ==
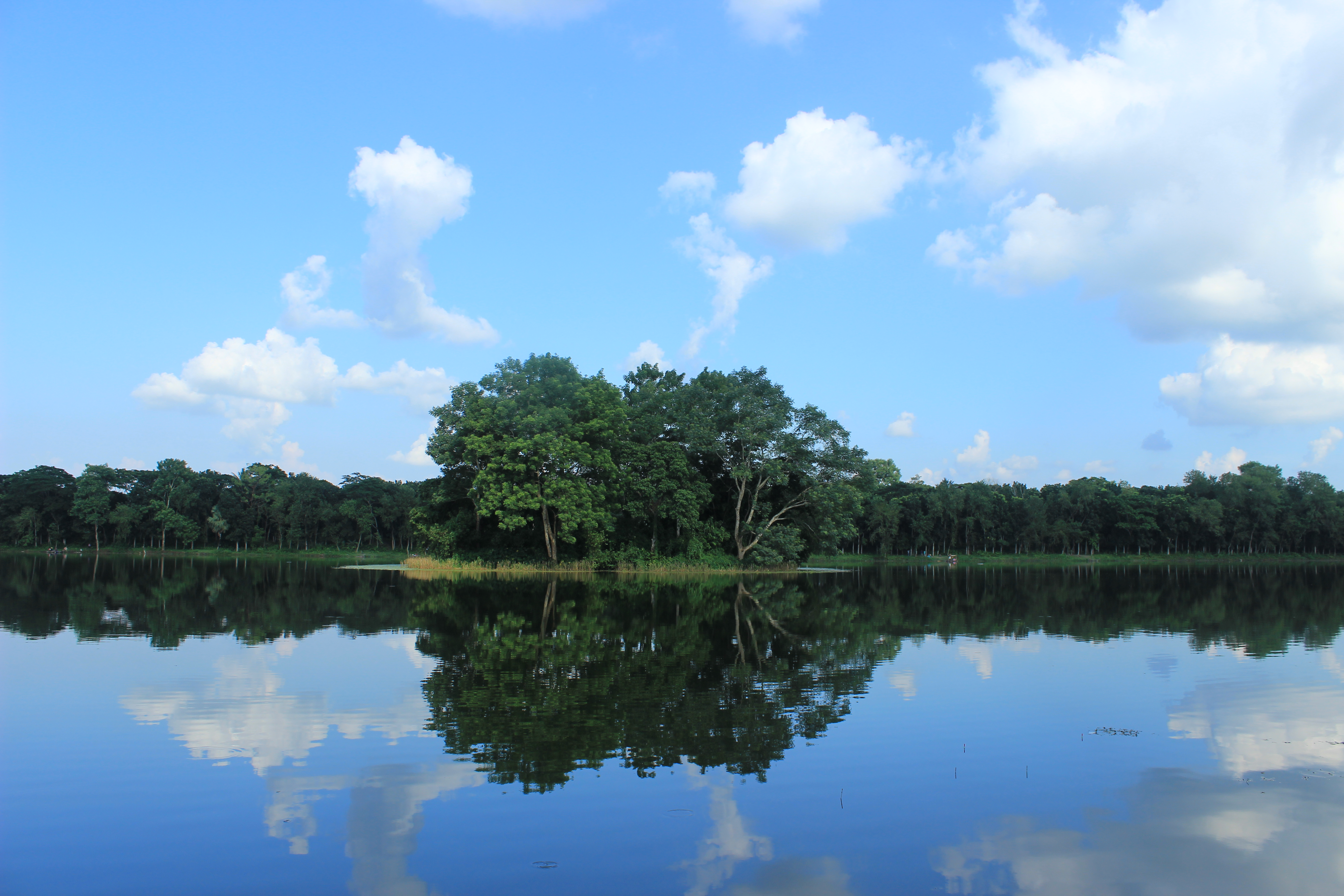
Durga Sagar in Madhabpasha

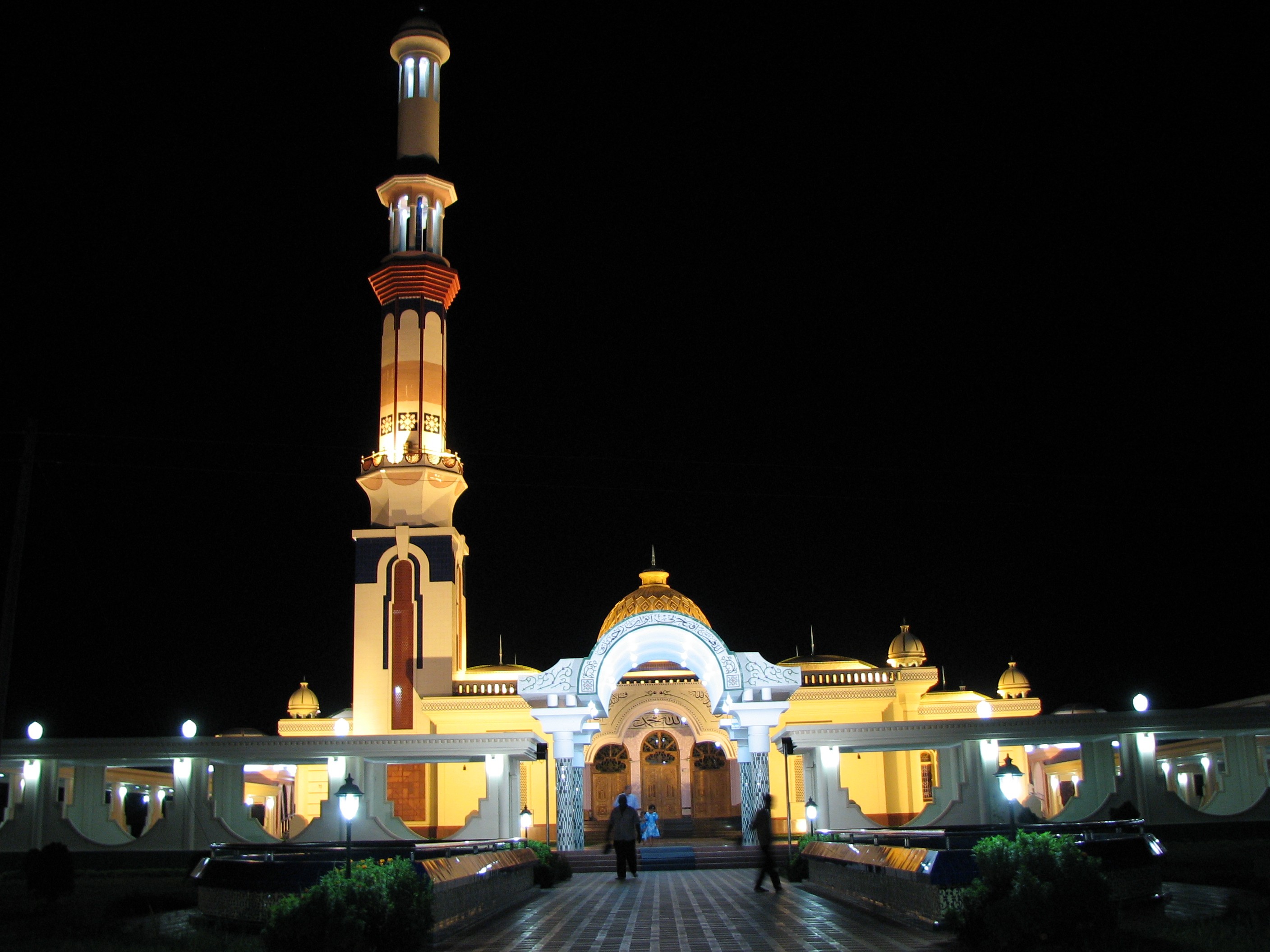
Baitul Aman Jame Masjid Complex

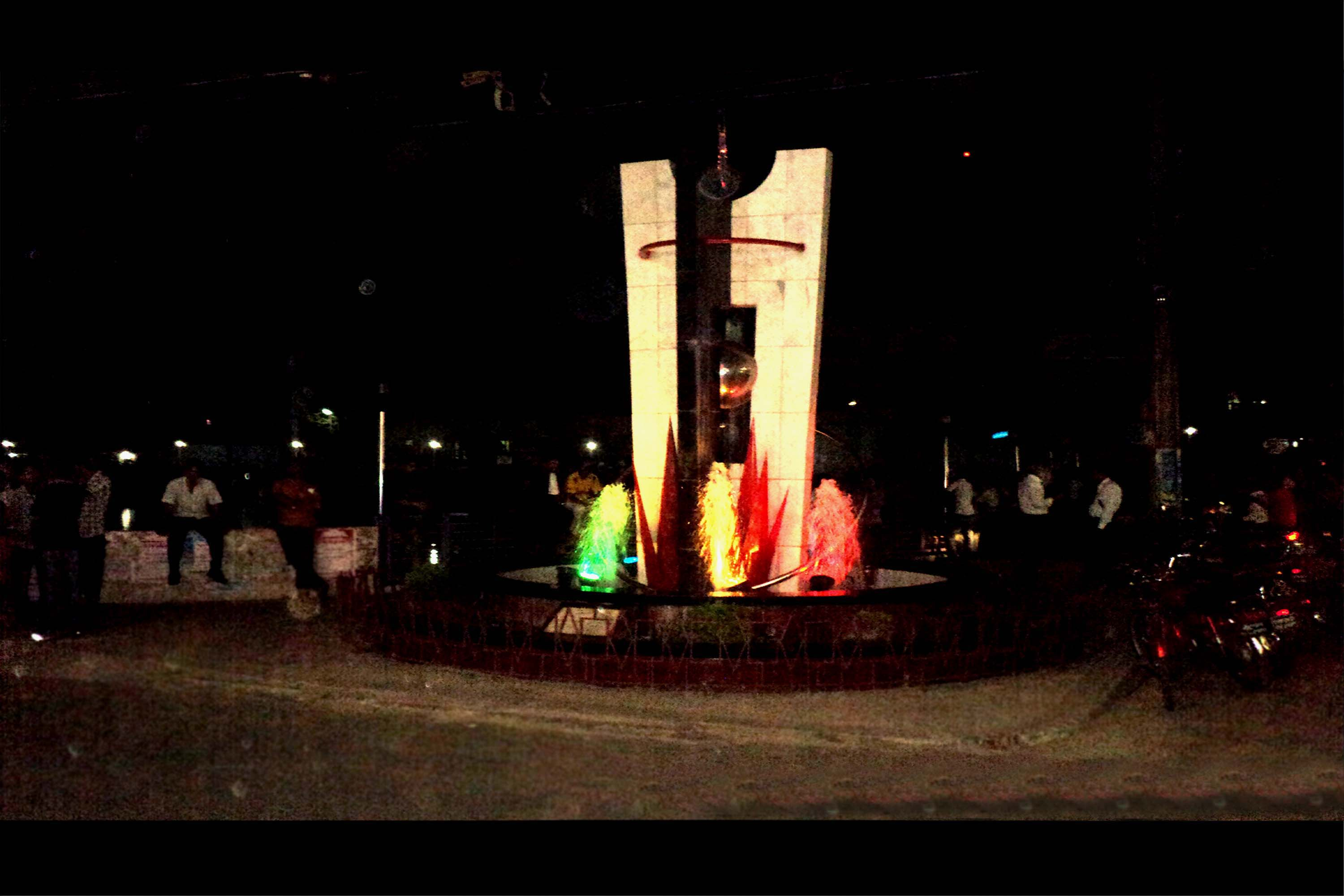
Shohel Chattar, Bibir Pukur Par

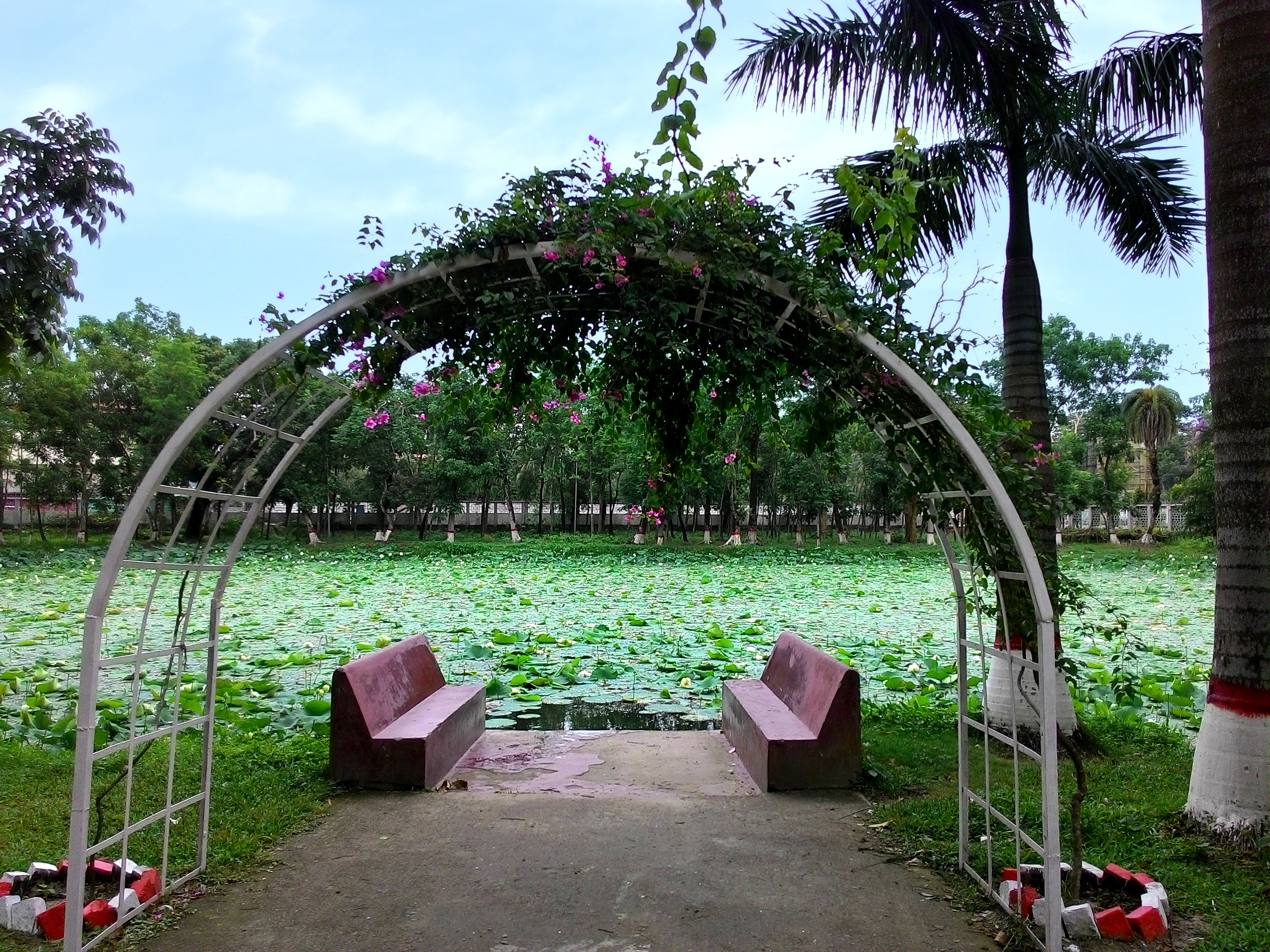
Padma Pukur, Barisal

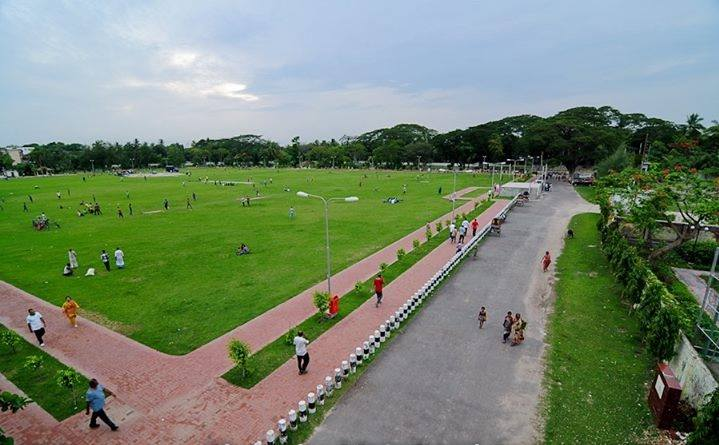
Bell's Park aka Bangabandhu Udyan

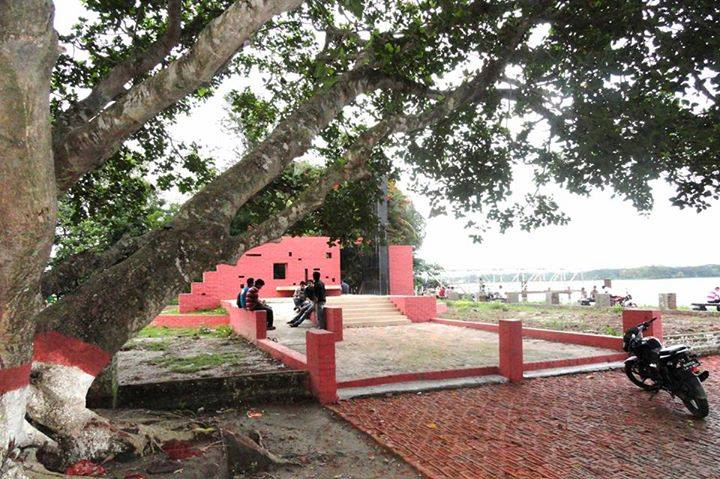
30 Godown Freedom Fighters Monument

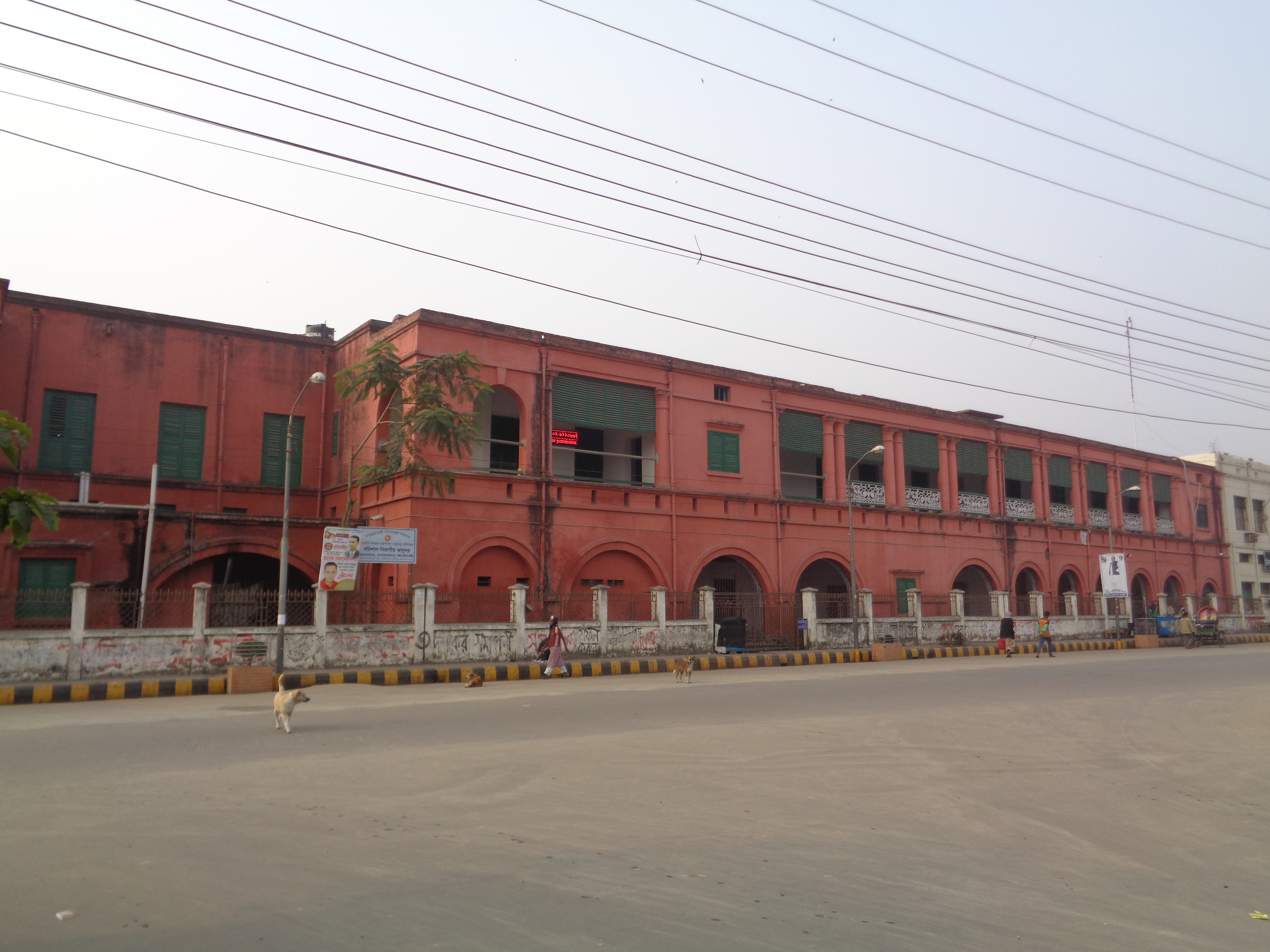
Barisal Collectorate building

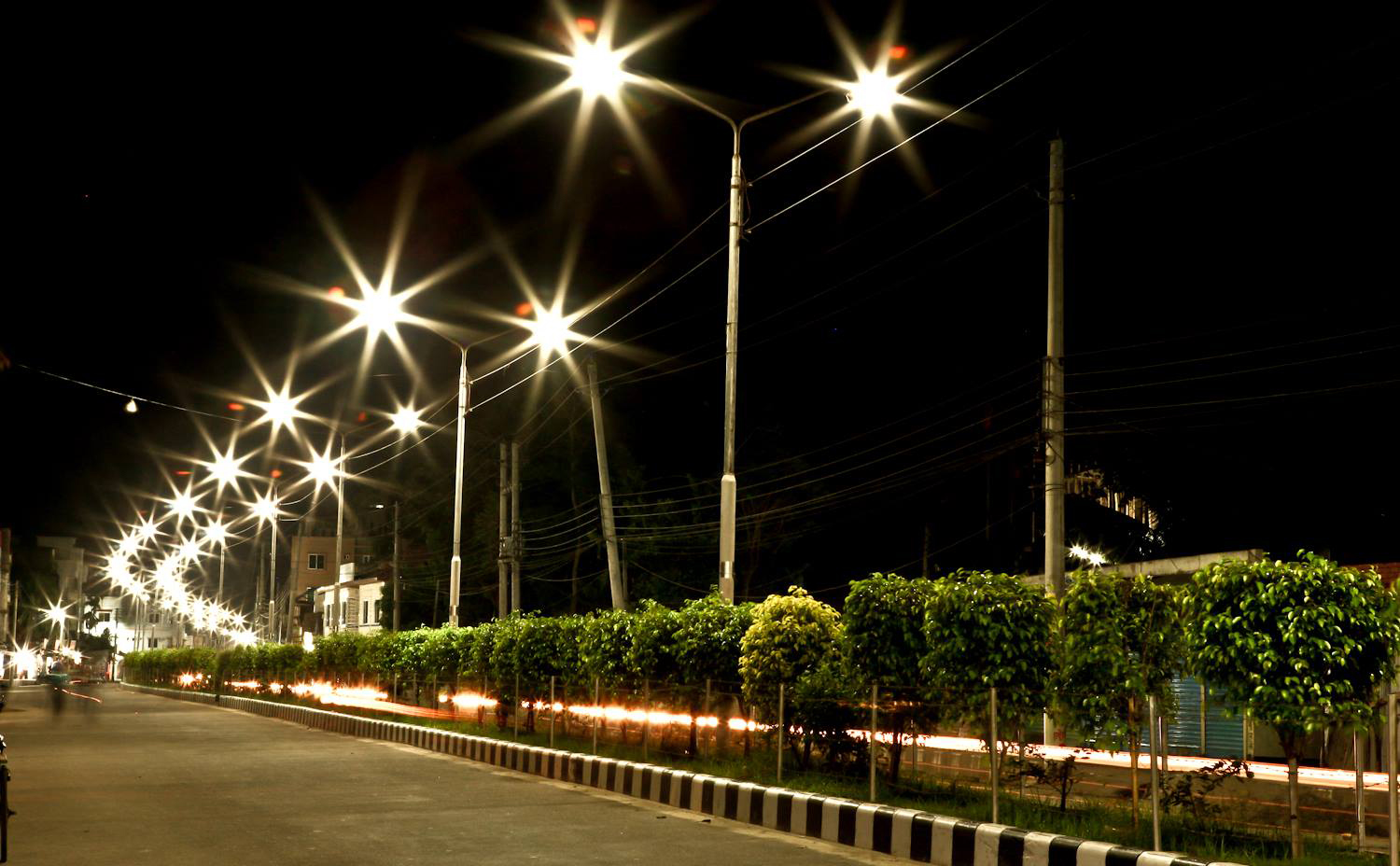
Barisal city at night

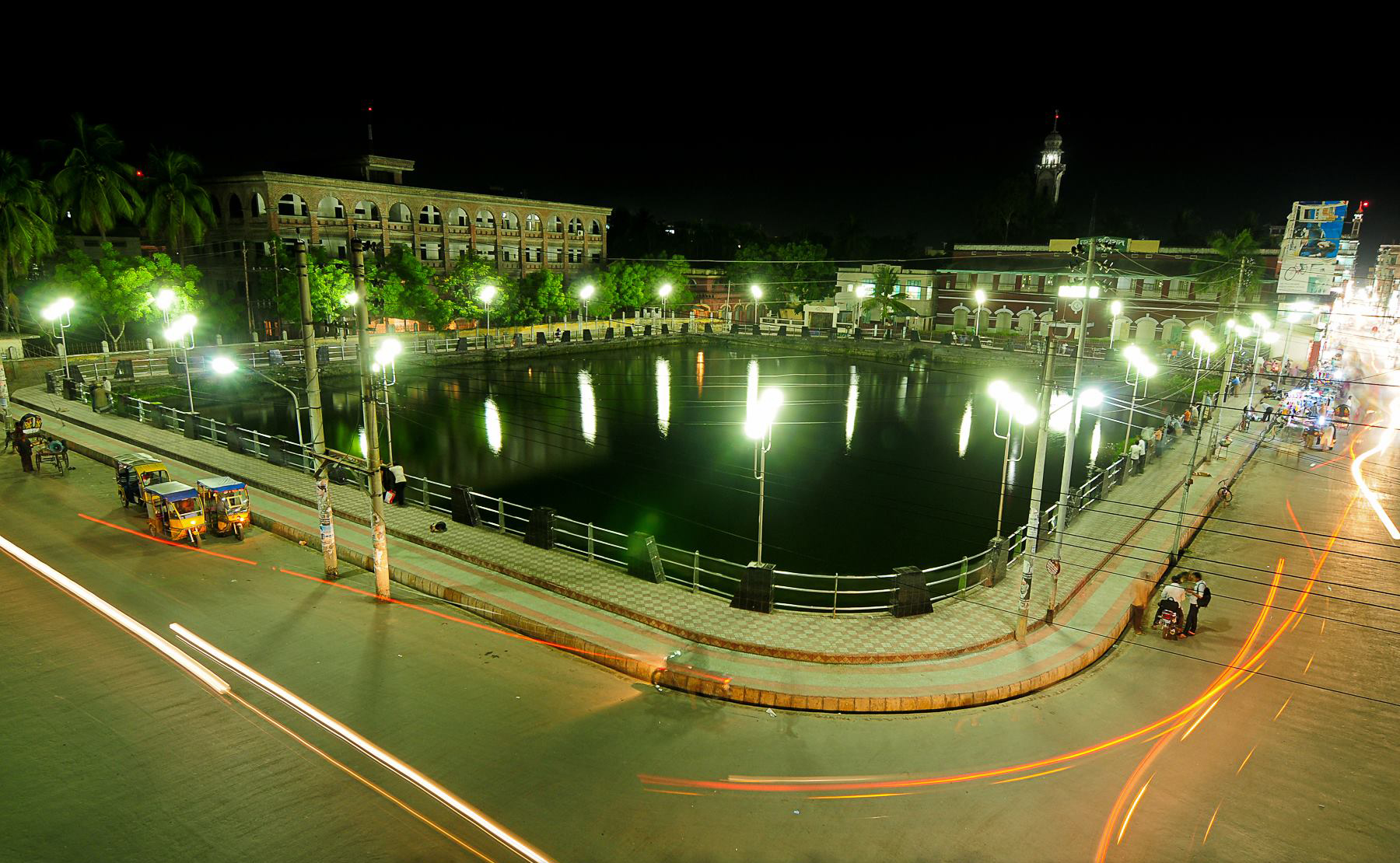
Collectorate pond

Durga Sagar, with an area of about 2,500 hectares, is the largest pond or dighi in southern Bangladesh. It is located at Madhabpasha village of Babuganj upazila, about 11 km away from Barisal town. Locally it is known as Madhabpasha Dighi. According to a desire of Rani Durgavati, mother of Raja Joynarayan, the dighi was dug in 1780 (1187 BS). There are coconut trees around the dighi, which, together with the dighi, are bounded by brick walls. In the middle of the dighi, there is an island with bushes. Migratory birds usually come here during winter. The surrounding areas of the dighi have now been turned into a picnic spot. Madhabpasha was a capital of the kingdom of Chandradvipa.

Located approximately 8 km from Barisal's central business district, the Roy family estate is known as 'Lakhutia' (note: there are several variations of the spelling of this word, including 'Lakutia' and 'Lakhotia'). The Lakhutia zamindar estate was founded by Roop Chandra Roy in the late 17th century. Apart from the main mansion itself, the estate has several Shiva temples and large ponds on the vast property. The Lakhutia mansion—including the Roy family's personal property—was effectively destroyed during the 1950 East Pakistan riots, and then again later during the 1971 Bangladesh genocide. While most of Lakhutia was destroyed during the 1950 and 1971 riots and genocide, the historical site and sparse remains of the mansion remain one of Barisal's main tourist attractions.

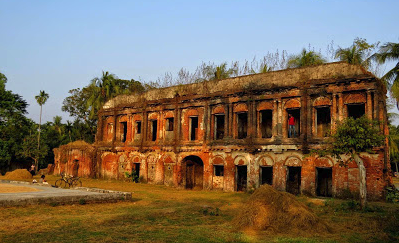
Lakhutia Zamindar Bari

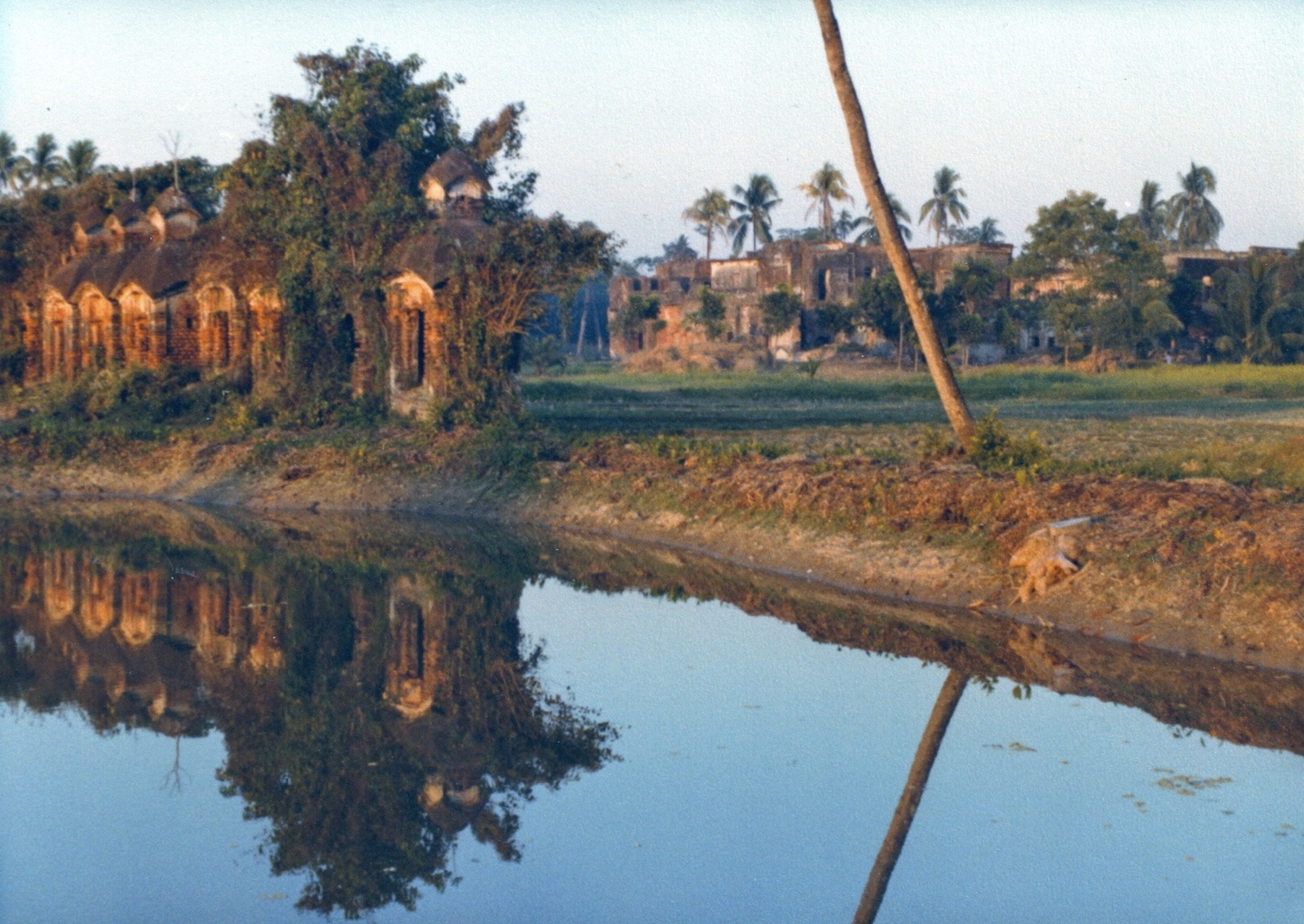
Lakhutia Shiva Temples

- Durga Sagar
- Baitul Aman Jame Masjid Complex
- Oxford Mission Church
- Bell's Park aka Bangubandhu Udyan
- Rupatoli area
- 30 Godown
- Planet Park
- Muktijoddha Park
- Narikel Bagan & Horticulture (Agriculture Training Institute)
- Lakhutia Zamindar Bari
- Korapur Miah Bari Masjid
- Shankar Math
- Town Hall
- Sher-e-Bangla Memorial Museum
- Bir Sreshtho Captain Mohiuddin Jahangir Library and Museum
- Jibanananda Das Museum
- Dapdapia Bridge
- Bibir Pukur
- Shahid Shukkur-Gafur Memorial Park, Amanatganj
- Taltali Bridge, Amanatganj
- Padma Pukur (Pond of Lotus)
- Kali Mandir founded by the poet Mukunda Das
- Martyred Intellectuals Memorial / BadhyaBhumi Monument (বধ্যভূমি স্মৃতিসৌধ)
- Bangladesh Rice Research Institute Regional Centre (Coconut Garden)

=== Architecture ===
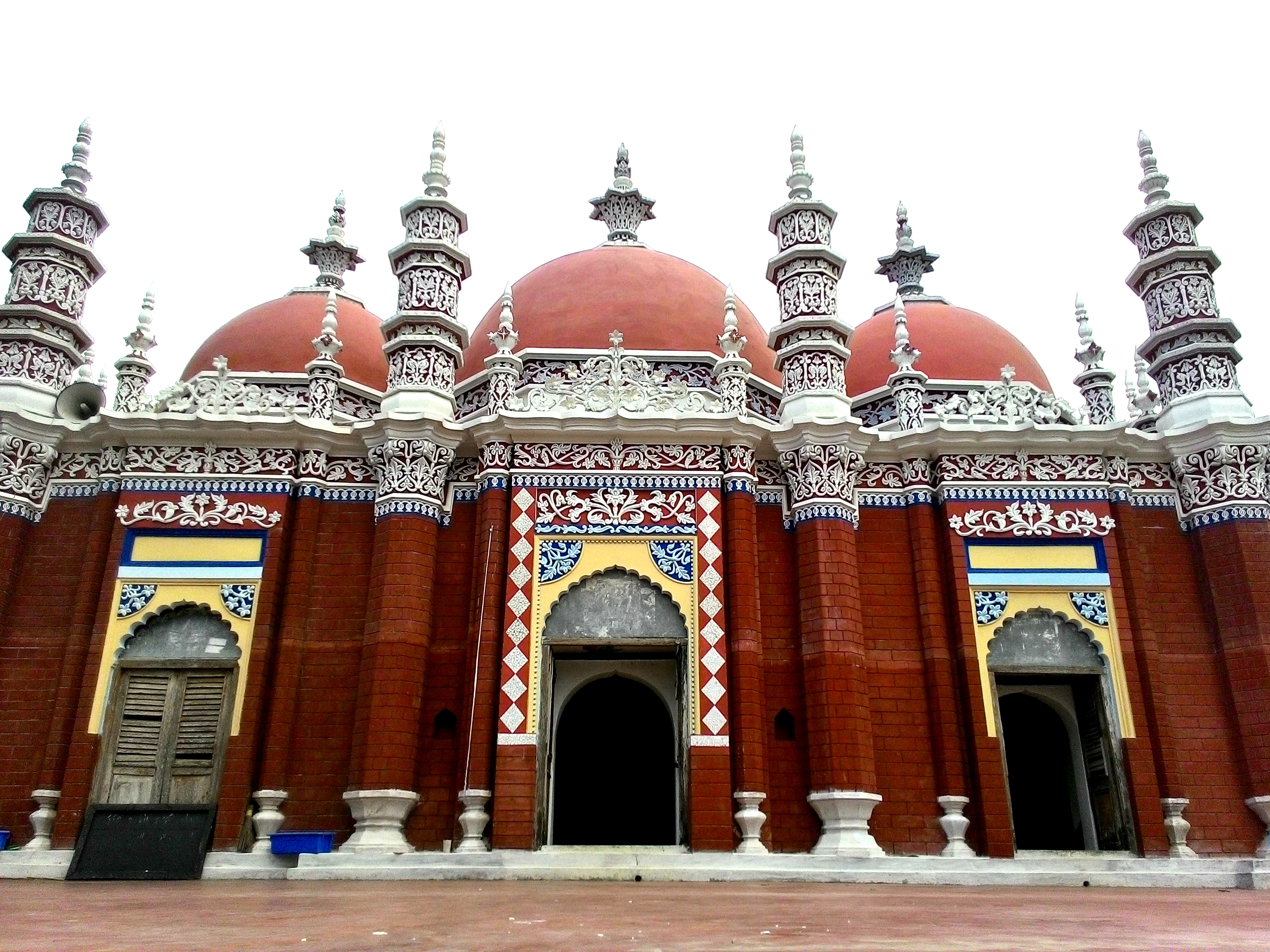
Miah Bari Mosque in Karapur, Barisal

Barisal's buildings are too diverse to be characterised by any particular architectural style, and have been built over a long period of time.

Some well known heritage buildings are:

- Barishal Zilla School building
- Kamalapur Mosque
- Oxford Mission Church
- Qasba Mosque

== Sports ==
Cricket and football are the two most popular sports in Barisal, while tennis and kabaddi are also popular. There is a national stadium in the city known as Barisal Divisional Stadium (also known as Abdur Rab Serniabad Stadium). It is a multi-purpose stadium and has a capacity of 15,000 spectators. It is currently used mostly for cricket matches. It is also used for football and other sports. Besides, different organizations share to stage a show there occasionally. Notable players from Barisal who have played for the national team include Shahriar Nafees, Sohag Gazi, Kamrul Islam Rabbi, and Fazle Mahmud.

There is a regional sports training centre under Bangladesh Krira Shiksha Pratisthan (BKSP) situated at Rahamatpur in Barisal. Barisal is also home to the Bangladesh Premier League franchise Fortune Barishal.

== Transport ==
=== Air ===
Barisal Airport is a domestic airport. Biman Bangladesh Airlines, Novoair, and US-Bangla Airlines use this port. The active air route is Barisal-Dhaka-Barisal.

=== River port ===
Barisal River Port is the second largest river port in Bangladesh. It is the most popular way of communication for the people of Barisal to Dhaka, the capital city. It is also a popular transport system with other districts like Bhola, Barguna, and Lakshmipur.

=== Road ===
Barisal is connected to most other regions of the country via the N8 national highway. There are two bus terminals in Barisal, Nathullabad Central Bus Terminal and Rupatali Bus Terminal, which connect Barisal to other districts.

== Education ==
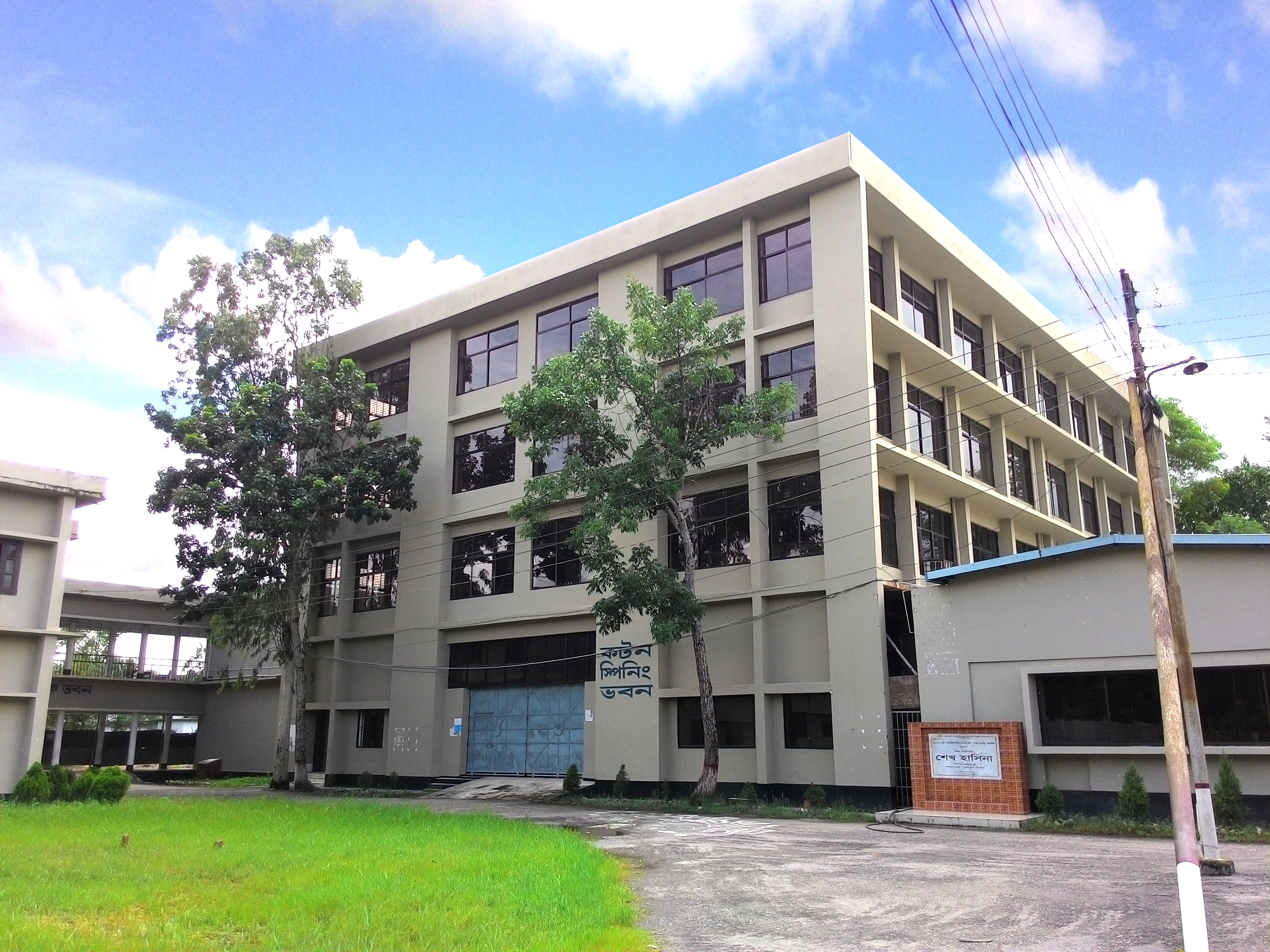
Cotton Spinning Shed of Shaheed Abdur Rab Serniabat Textile Engineering College Barisal.

Barisal is home to many educational institutions. Govt. Brojomohan College is the oldest institution of higher education in the city, founded in 1889. There is a public university (the University of Barisal) and two private universities, a government medical college Sher-e-Bangla Medical College (SBMC), a textile engineering college Shaheed Abdur Rab Serniabat Textile Engineering College and an engineering college Barisal Engineering College. There are also educational institutions like Barisal Zilla School, Barisal Cadet College, Govt. Syed Hatem Ali College, Government Women's College, Govt. Barisal College, Amrita Lal Dey College, Barisal Govt. Girls High School, Barisal Model School and College and Barisal Asmat Ali Khan Institution (A.K. School). Besides these, there are three teacher training colleges, a government polytechnic institute, two technical institutes, a homeopathic college, and a social welfare training centre.

Major institutions include:

- Barishal Cadet College
- Barishal Engineering College
- Barisal Government Women's College
- Barisal Govt. Polytechnic Institute
- Barishal Zilla School
- Brojomohun College
- Government Syed Hatem Ali College
- Infra Polytechnic Institute, Barisal
- Shahid Abdur Rab Serniabat Textile Engineering College
- Sher-e-Bangla Medical College
- University of Barishal

== Media ==
Barisal is a center for the newspaper, periodical, and book publishers. Some locally published newspapers and periodicals are:

=== Newspapers ===
- Daily Ajker Barisal
- Daily Ajker Barta
- Daily Ajker Poribartan
- Daily Banglar Bone
- Daily Barisal Barta
- Daily Barisal Bhorer Alo
- Daily Barisal Pratidin
- Daily Bhorer Angikar
- Daily Biplobi Bangladesh
- Daily Dakkhinanchal
- Daily Motobad
- Daily Satya Songbad
- Daily Shahnama

=== Periodicals ===
- Bakerganj Parikrama
- Chirantan Bangla
- Upakul
- Gournadi Parikrama
- Khadem
- Jago Nare

== See also ==
- Upazilas of Bangladesh
- Districts of Bangladesh
- Divisions of Bangladesh
- Upazila
- Thana
