= Bell's Park =

Park in Bangladesh

- Bangabandhu Udyan
- বেল'স পার্ক
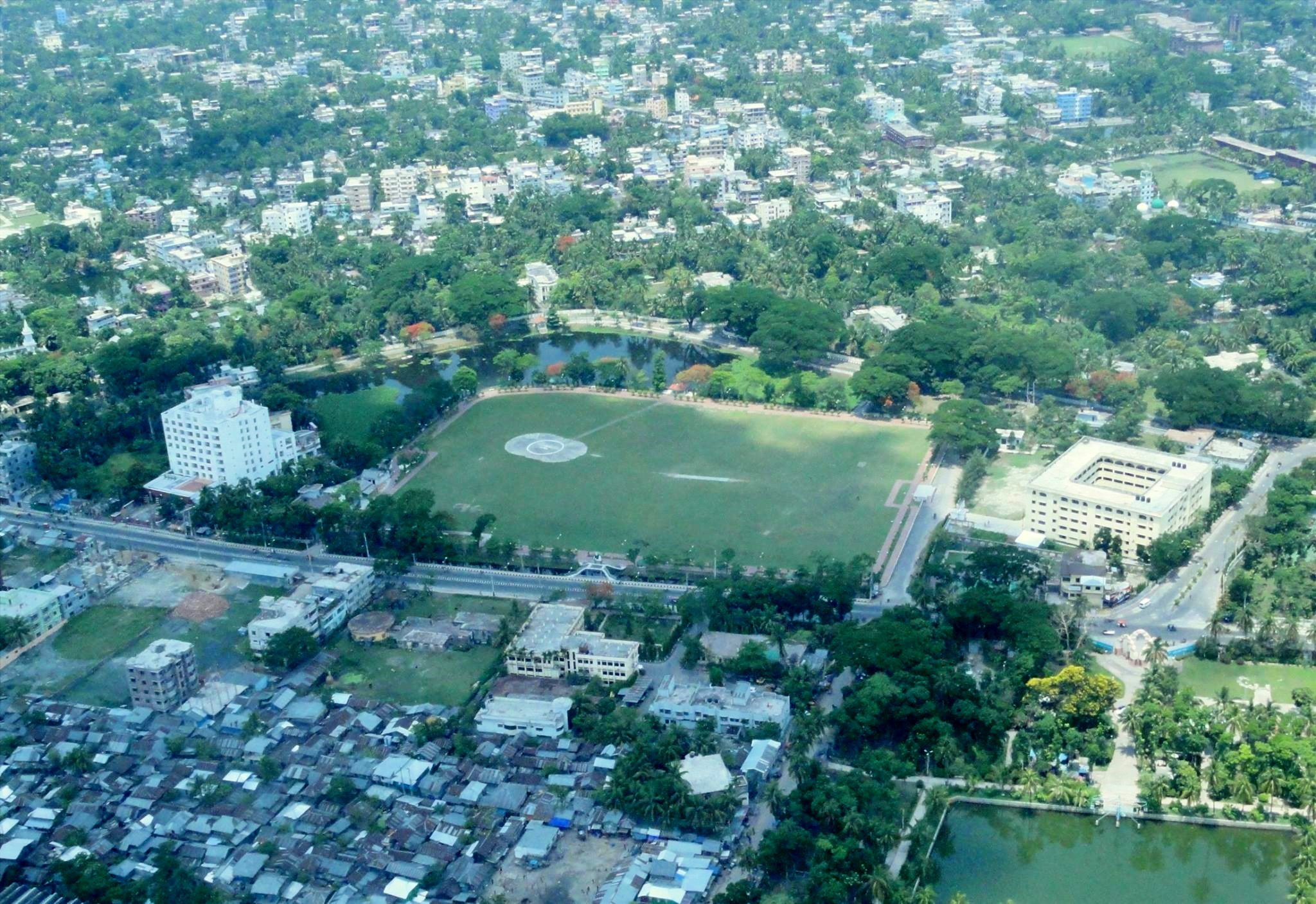
- Aerial View of Bell's Park
- Interactive map of Bell's Park
- Type: Urban park
- Location: Bandh Road, Barisal, Bangladesh
- Coordinates: 22°41′34″N 90°22′08″E
- Area: 9.47 acres (3.83 ha) (approx.)
- Established: 1896; 130 years ago
- Status: Open all year

Bell's Park is a historic urban park and recreation area situated at the heart of Barishal, a city in south-central Bangladesh. This park is one of the beautiful areas in Barisal with a playground, walkway, helipad, many trees and an adjacent lake.

== History ==
The park was constructed in 1896 by subscriptions during the magistracy of N.D. Beatson-Bell to celebrate the visit of Sir Alexander Mackenzie, Lieutenant-Governor of Bengal. At that time, it was laid out in the open space between the civil lines and the riverside road. Kirtankhola river used to be located just beside the park and many palm trees were planted across the road. The park was named after Beatson Bell to recognize his contribution to the city development, Muslim education and public health of Barisal people.

The park has been the principal playground of the city for decades and is the center of all sports and athletic activities. It has been also used for huge public meeting where Bangabandhu Sheikh Mujibur Rahman, Ziaur Rahman, Hussain Muhammad Ershad, Sheikh Hasina, Khaleda Zia and other national leaders came and gave a speech to people. It also hosts many other social and cultural events yearly.

The park was renamed as Bangabandhu Udyan in 1996 by the ruling party and a stage and Bangabandhu mural was built in memory of his first visit to Barisal to join the public meeting there in 1972.

In 2011, Shawkat Hossain Hiron, former mayor of the city, took initiatives for the significant development and beautification of the park. Walkway surrounded by the park, flower plants, benches, and illumination, was done at a cost of around 1 Crore Taka.

== Gallery ==
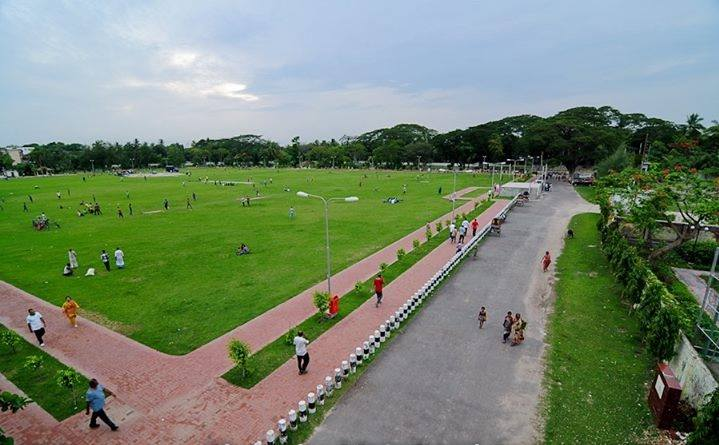

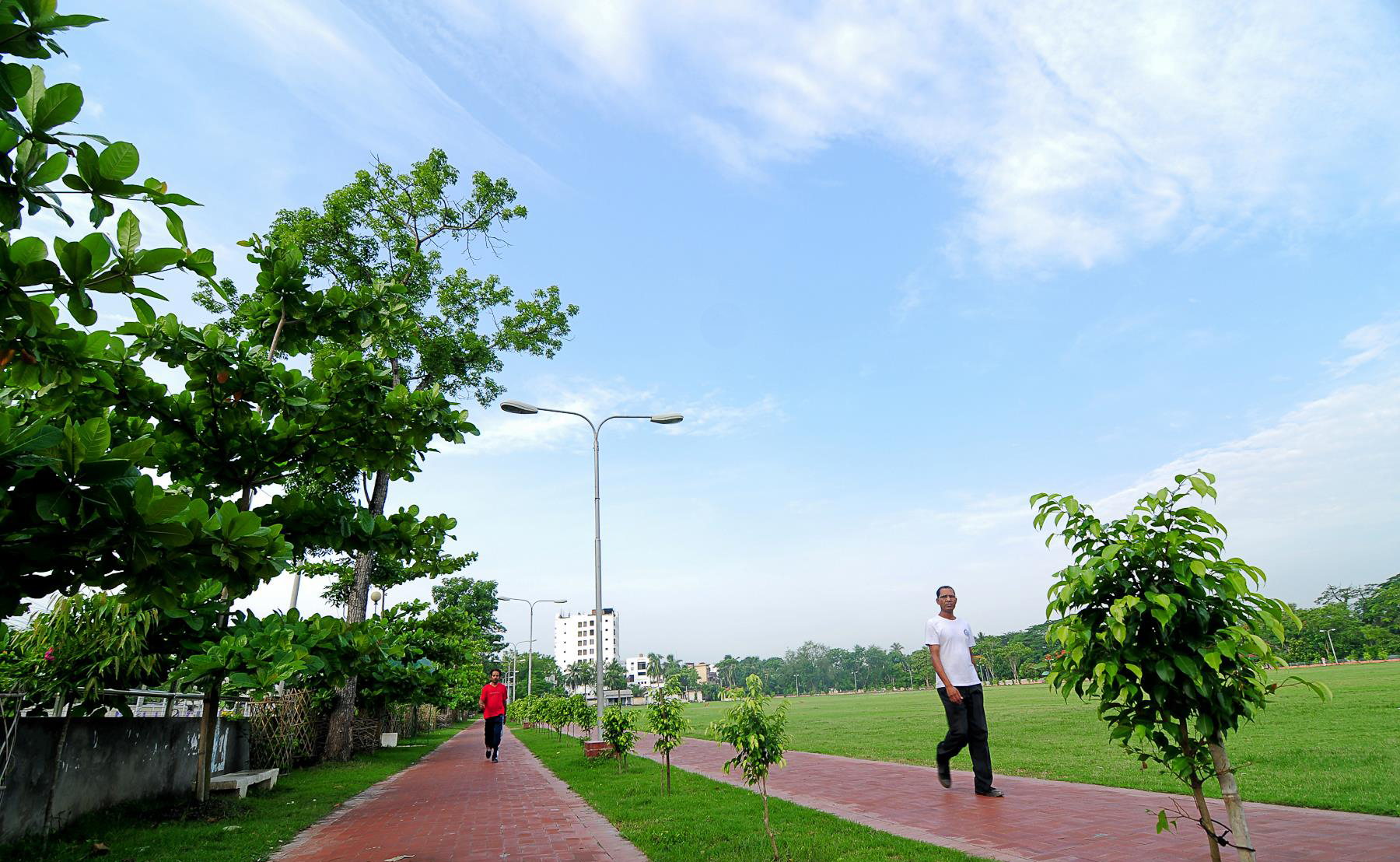

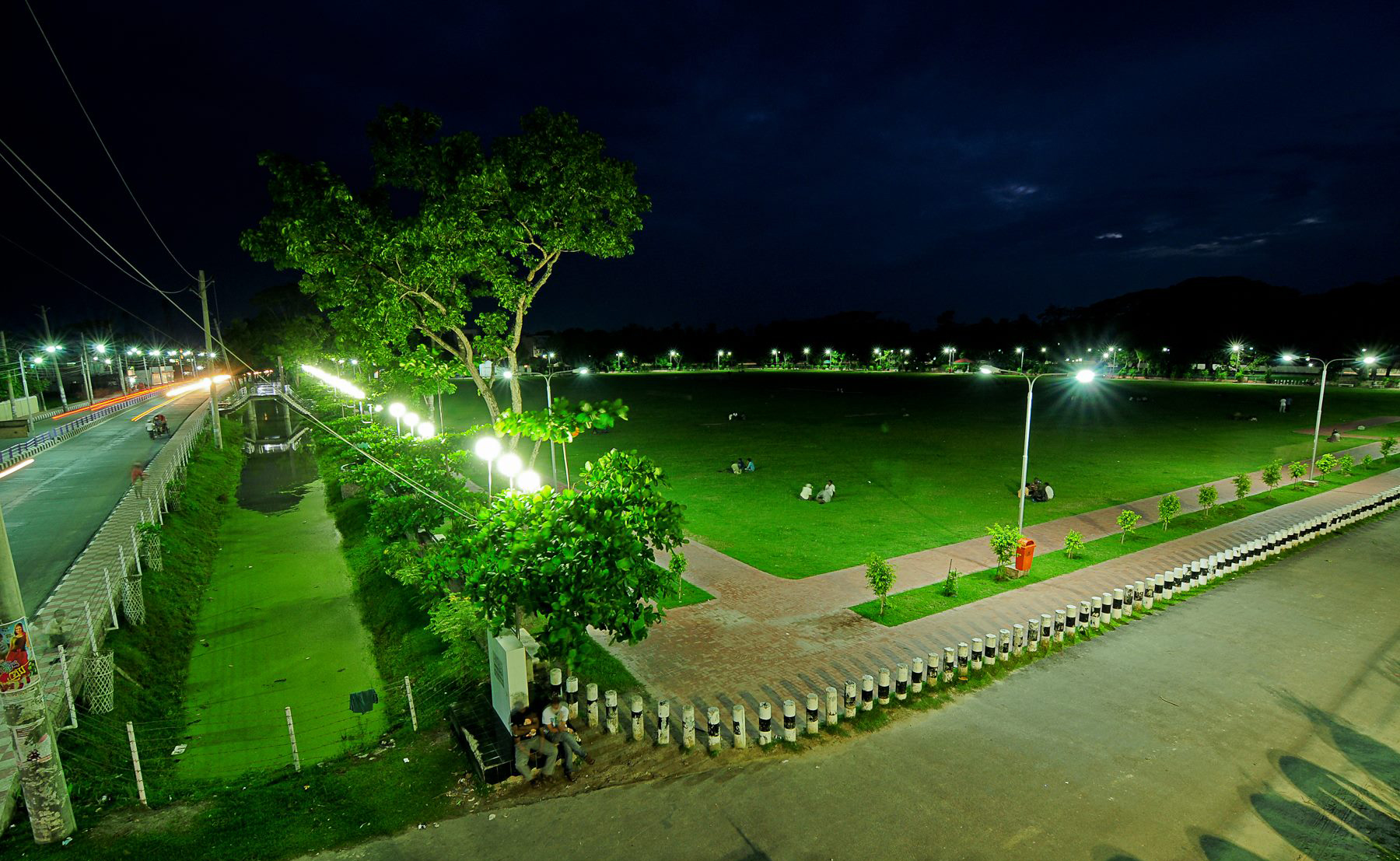
