= Rupatoli =

Neighborhood in Barishal City

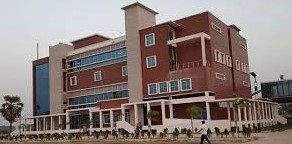
Opsonin Pharma branch based in Rupatali.

Rupatali is a zone and neighborhood in Barisal, Bangladesh. The area is developed by Rupatali Housing Estate. Its terminal, known as Rupatali Bus Terminal, connects the city of Barisal to other districts. Rupatali's points of interests include newly built schools, shopping centres, wood and multi-stem tree markets.

== Geography ==
Rupatoli is a neighborhood located in the southern part of Barishal, Bangladesh, covering an area of approximately 7.2 square kilometers. It is situated within the Barishal Sadar Upazila and is part of the Barishal City Corporation. Rupatoli is positioned near the Kirtankhola River, offering a blend of residential areas and commercial establishments. The neighborhood is known for its significant infrastructure developments, including schools, shopping centers, and the Rupatoli Bus Terminal, which serves as a major transportation hub connecting Barishal to other districts. Geographically, Rupatoli is located at a latitude of around 22.704° N and a longitude of 90.3569° E, making it an important locality for both local and regional connectivity.

== Education ==
Rupatoli, being part of the Barishal City Corporation, has a number of educational institutions that cater to the local population. The neighborhood is home to several primary and secondary schools, providing foundational education to children in the area. Among these are Rupatoli Model School and College, which offers both school and higher secondary education, and Rupatoli Government Primary School, which focuses on early education.

== See also ==
- Barisal City Corporation
- Barisal District
- Barisal Division
