= Port of Barisal =

Second largest and busiest river port in Bangladesh

Port of Barisal বরিশাল নদীবন্দর
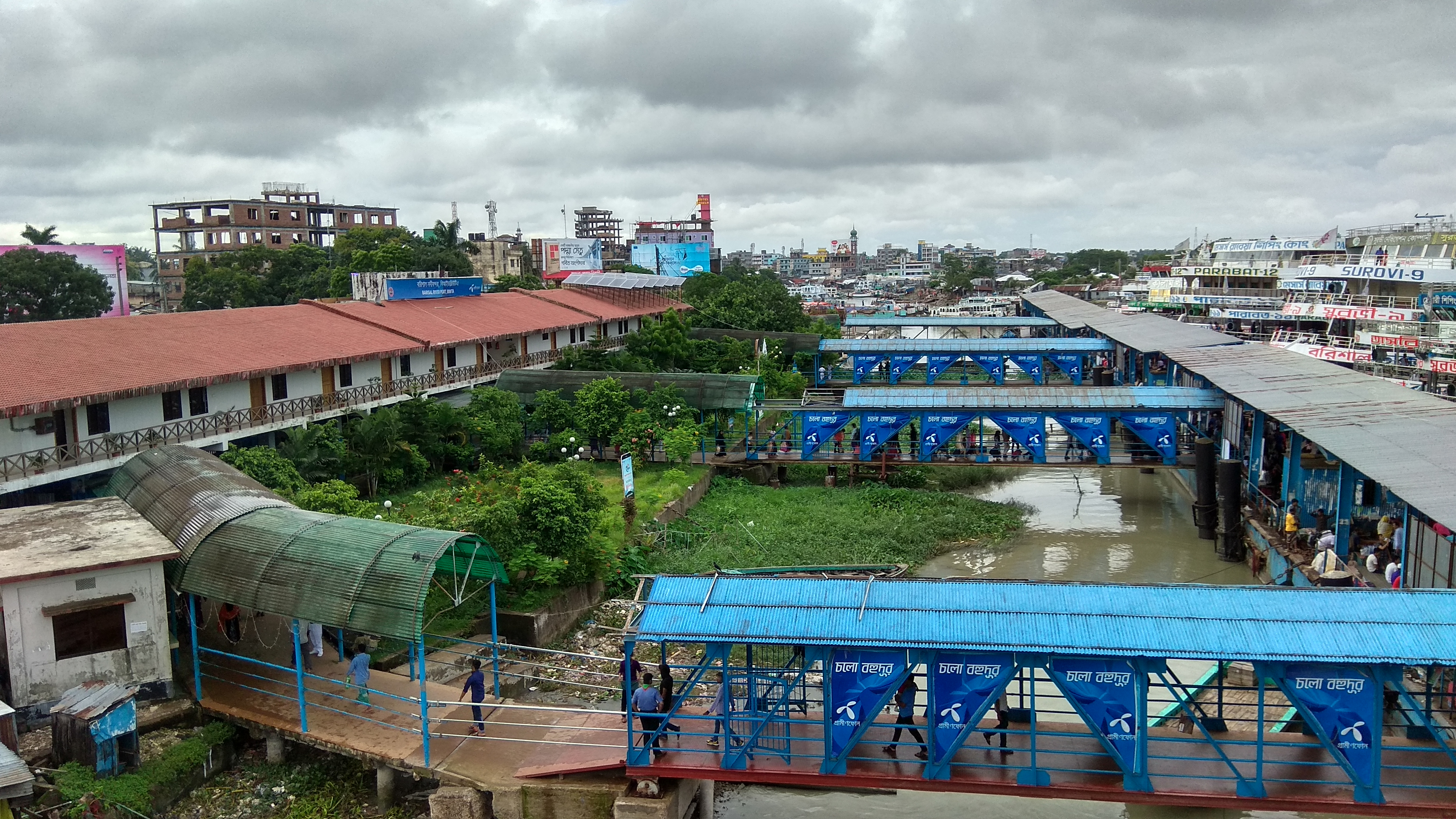
- Interactive map of Port of Barisal বরিশাল নদীবন্দর
- Location in Bangladesh

Location
- Country: Bangladesh
- Location: Barisal
- Coordinates: 22°42′N 90°23′E
- UN/LOCODE: BGBZL

Details
- Opened: 18th century
- Owned by: Bangladesh Inland Water Transport Authority
- Type of harbour: River port

The Port of Barisal, officially known as Barisal River Port is the second largest and busiest river port in Bangladesh after Dhaka in terms of passenger traffic. It is located on the banks of the Kirtankhola river in the city of Barisal. The port operates daily services between Dhaka and Barisal as well as most of the districts in southern part of the country including Chandpur, Narayanganj, Bhola, Laxmipur, Pirojpur and Barguna. It also operates inter-district routes around Barisal.

The port of Barisal is an important hub of transportation system connecting different parts of Bangladesh through waterways. It is also considered as a transit point between Mongla and Chittagong marine ports, Khulna and Dhaka and other river ports of Bangladesh as well as between West Bengal and Assam and Tripura of India.

== History ==
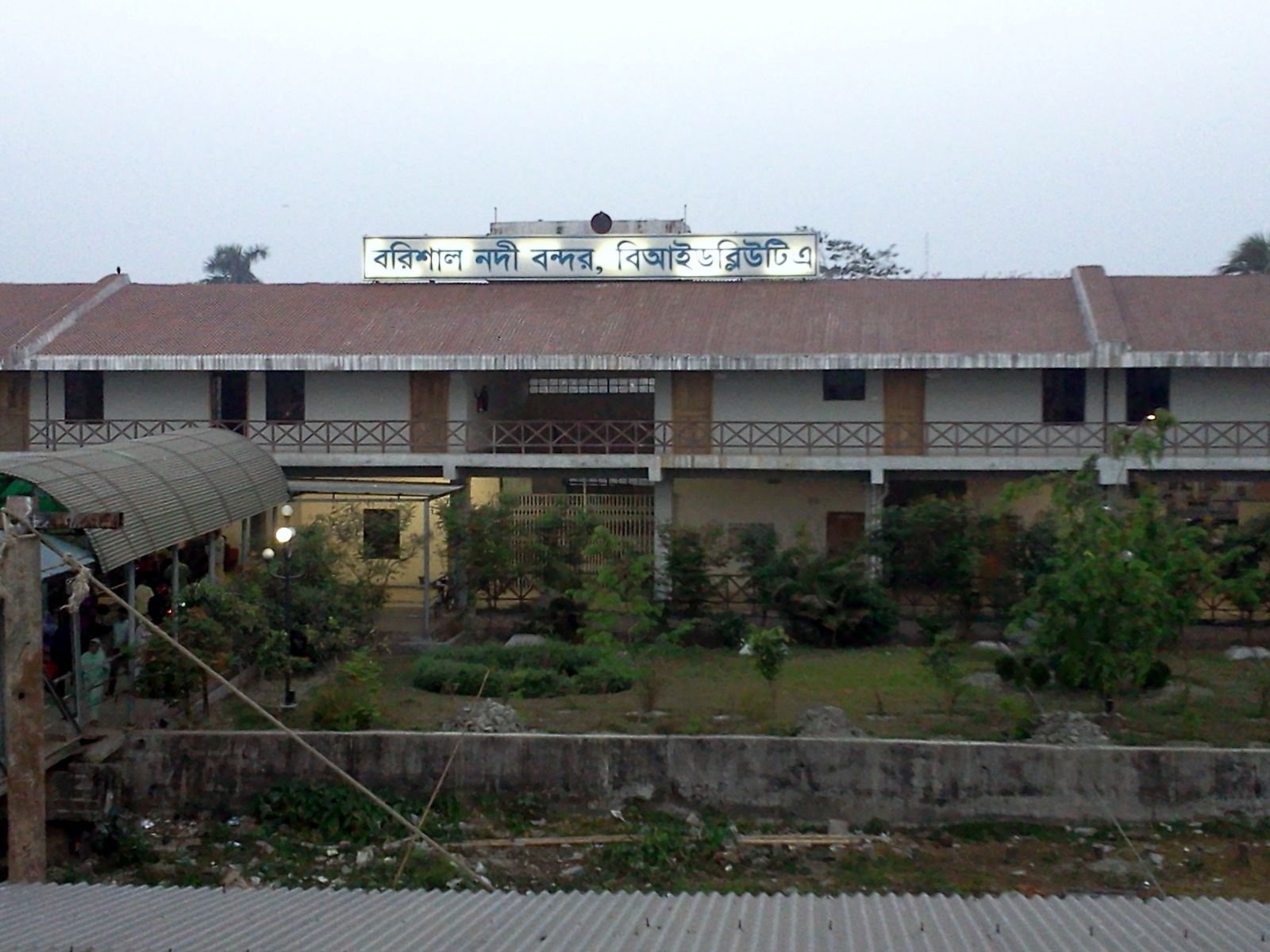
Barisal launch terminal

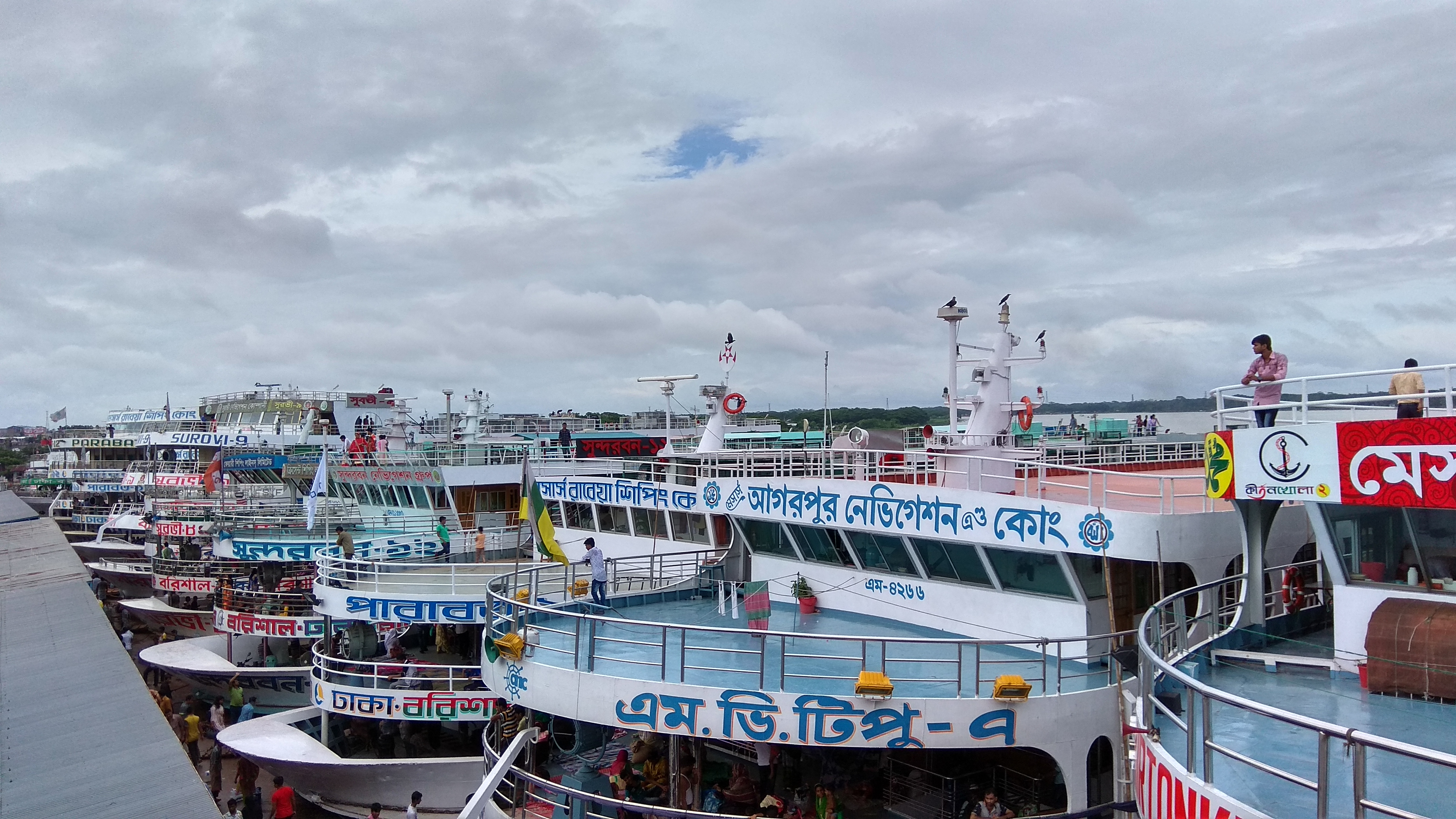
Barisal River Port Launch Terminal, Bangladesh (4)

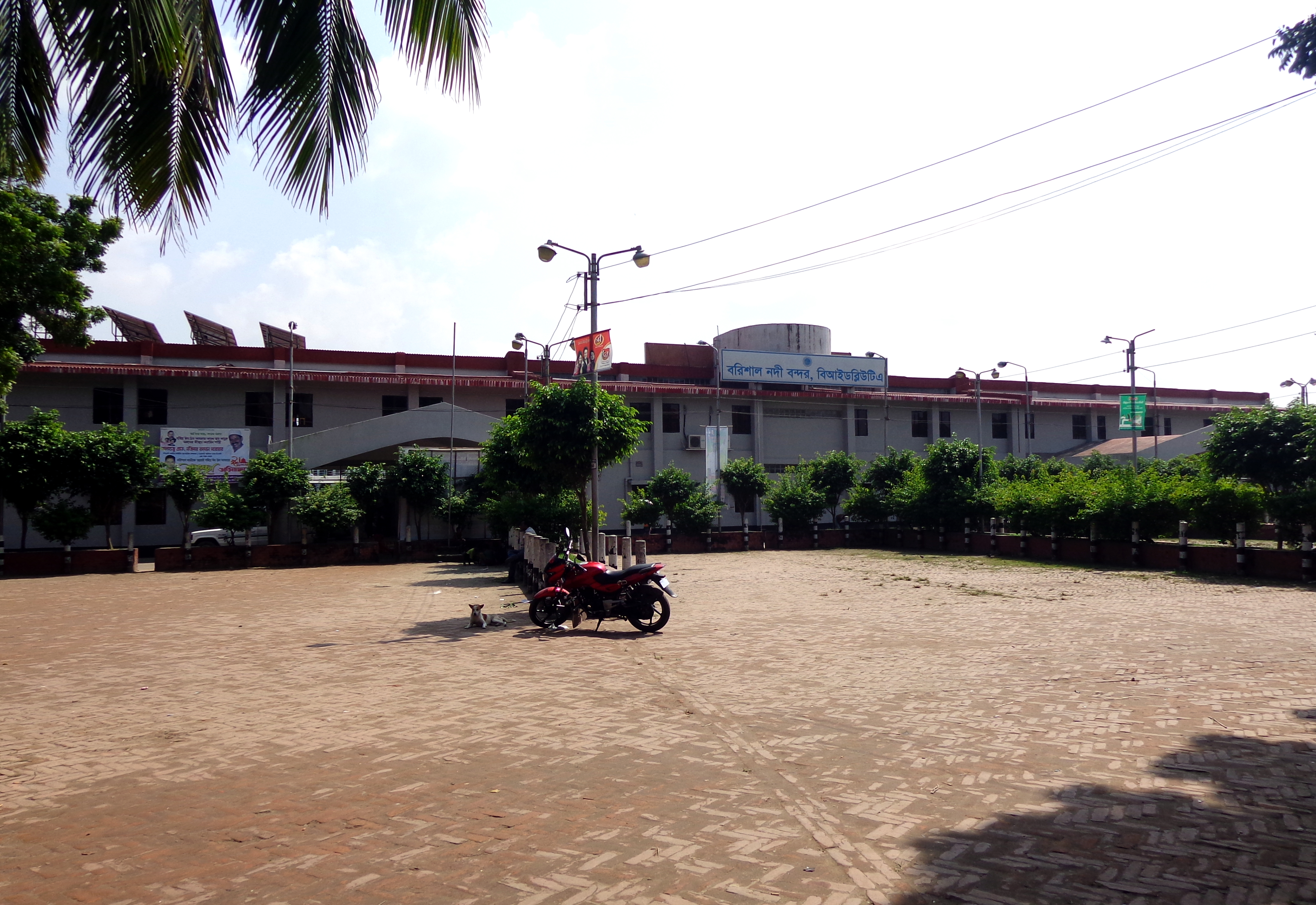
Barisal River Port Area

Rocket Steamer Terminal

The Barisal river port has a recorded existence since the Mughal Empire. It was then called "Gird-e-Bandar", a river station which was known for the trade of salt, spices, and woods. It was turned into Barisal Bandar (port) during the British rule after the town committee was established in 1869 and achieved municipal status in 1876.

Steamers first began to use the rivers of Barisal shortly before 1880. In 1884 Bengal Central Flotilla Company introduced regular steamer service between Barisal and Khulna. Subsequently, Barisal became an important steamer centre for both inter-district routes and as a station on the main route from other districts of Bangladesh to Calcutta and as a terminus for branch lines from Chittagong, Noakhali and Madaripur. There existed also a number of feeder services in the interior of the district. It later became the regional headquarters of Indian General Navigation, River Steam Navigation, Indian General River Steamer companies in British period to connect North and Eastern part of Bengal with the capital city.

After the 1947 Bengal partition, Pakistan River Steamer Services (PRS) was formed and handed over its service it to East Pakistan Inland Water Transport Authority (EPIWTA) in 1958. Formed under East Pakistan Inland Water Transportation Ordinance’ the EPIWTA gave Barisal River Station the status of River Port in 1960. Followed by the independence of Bangladesh, EPIWTA was named as Bangladesh Inland Water Transport Authority (BIWTA), which currently takes care of all related development, maintenance, and operations of inland water transport and of inland waterways in Bangladesh.

== Development of the port ==
In 1964, the East Pakistan Inland Water Transport Authority (EPIWTA) undertook a port development initiative for the five major river ports of the eastern region of the then Pakistan including Dhaka, Barisal, Chandpur, Khulna and Narayanganj. The project included the construction of permanent terminal buildings and other facilities for the transportation of passengers and goods. However, the port of Barisal project was left unimplemented for an unknown reason and only a half-bricked tin-shed structure was built in 1980.

After years, the Bangladesh government undertook a project in 2003 for the construction of a modern river terminal and jetties in Barisal river port at a cost of Tk 9.5 crore. It was later revised again and the government finally approved a port development and modernization project in 2009 at a cost of about Tk 17.6 crore for the construction of a modern terminal building on 1,554 square metre land, 1500 square metre parking yard, 1200 metre steel boundary and retaining wall, 714 metre walkway, 1,000 square metre cargo shed, 400 square metre transit cargo shed, 120 feet long six pontoons with modern loading and unloading facilities, four steel gangway, passenger lounge and waiting room with health and sanitation facilities, development and maintenance of navigability by regular dredging and beautification of the terminal and adjacent areas of the port.

In March 2010, the Barisal river port development and modernization project started and scheduled to be completed by the end of 2011. The new port was inaugurated by the Prime Minister Sheikh Hasina in 2013.
