= Bengalization =

Bengalization may refer to:

- Spread of the Bengali language, people and culture:
  - Bengali Renaissance - a movement in Bengal region during the period of the British Indian Empire period
  - Bengali nationalism - a form of nationalism that focuses on Bengalis as a singular nation
  - Bengali language movement - a movement to recognize Bengali as an official language in former East Pakistan
  - Bangladeshi diaspora - people of Bangladeshi descent who have immigrated to or were born in another country
- A cultural shift of whereby populations in North East Indian states adopted historical Bengali culture and languages.

== See also ==
- Renamed places in Bangladesh
- Renaming of places in West Bengal
