= Government Syed Hatem Ali College =

Government College in Barishal

Coordinates: 22.70185°N 90.35479°E

Govt. Syed Hatem Ali College, Barisal
- সরকারি সৈয়দ হাতেম আলি কলেজ
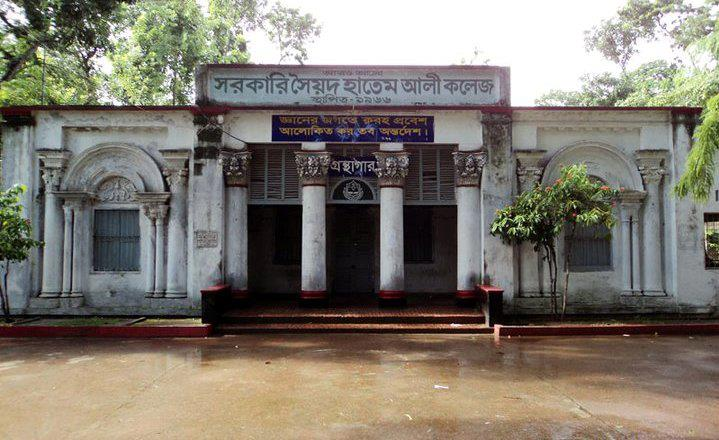
- Front of the college
- Motto: আরও আলো
- Motto in English: More Light
- Type: University college
- Established: 1966; 60 years ago
- Principal: Prof. Md. Harun-or-Rashid Howlader; Prof. Md. Akhterujjaman Khan (Vice-principal)
- Students: 7000+
- Location: Barisal, Bangladesh
- Campus: Barisal Sadar (Kotwali), Barisal
- Nickname: SHAC
- Website: gshac.gov.bd

Government Syed Hatem Ali College (Bengali: সরকারি সৈয়দ হাতেম আলি কলেজ), located in Barisal, is one of the renowned colleges of southern Bangladesh. It is a university level college where students besides class 11 and 12, can attend into bachelor courses as well. Particularly, the higher secondary grade (class 11–12) students of this college are doing highest results every year than all the colleges in the southern region of Bangladesh.

== History ==
The college was established in 1966 on 22 acres of land. It was donated by the famous social politician and multinational businessman Lt. Syed Hatem Ali and this college was nationalized in 1986. His sons Syed Kawser Hossain and Syed Asadul Hoq (Bachchu) also contributed a lot for the advancement of the institute in many ways over the years.

== Academic departments ==
The college has 12 departments under 4 faculties for under graduate level. The faculties are:

=== Faculty of Arts ===
- Department of Bengali
- Department of English
- Department of History
- Department of Islamic Studies
- Department of Islamic History and Culture

=== Faculty of Business Studies ===
- Department of Accounting
- Department of Marketing
- Department of Management Studies

=== Faculty of Science ===
- Department of Zoology

=== Faculty of Social Sciences ===
- Department of Economics
- Department of Political Science
- Department of Social Work

== See also ==
- Brojomohun College
