= List of renamed places in Bangladesh =

The following is the list of places in Bangladesh that underwent a name change. (Note: Multiple references:) The most common names in English are in bold letters.

== Barishal Division ==
- Barisal → Barishal (2018)

== Dhaka Division ==
- Anta Gharer Maidan → Victoria Park → Bahadur Shah Park (1957)
- Manipur → Ayub Nagar → Sher-e-Bangla Nagar
- Bagh-e-Badshahi → Shahbag
- Bikrampur → Munshiganj
- Fatehabad → Faridpur
- Dhaka → Jahangir Nagar → Dacca → Dhaka (1982)
- Ramna Race Course → Suhrawardy Udyan

== Chattogram Division ==
- Bhulua → Bhullooah → Bollua → Noakhali
- Chittagong → Chattogram (2018)
- Daruchini Dwip → Narikel Jinjira → St. Martin's Island
- Panowa → Palongkee → Cox's Bazar
- Sagarnaiya → Chhagalnaiya
- Shamshernagar → Feni
- Tippera → Roshnabad → Komolangk → Comilla → Cumilla (2018)

== Khulna Division ==
- Bhoborpara → Baidyanathtala → Mujibnagar
- Jessore → Jashore (2018)

== Mymensingh Division ==
- Nasirabad → Mymensingh

== Rajshahi Division ==
- Bogra → Bogura (2018)
- Nawabganj → Chapai Nawabganj

== Sylhet Division ==
- Srihatta → Jalalabad → Sirhat → Silhet → Sylhet
