= Barishal Engineering College =

- বরিশাল ইঞ্জিনিয়ারিং কলেজ
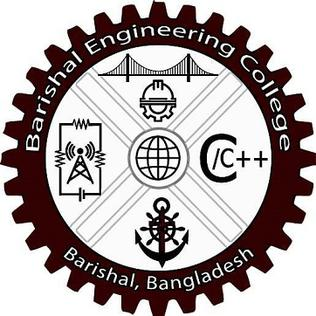
- Type: Public Engineering College
- Established: 2018; 8 years ago
- Academic affiliations: Faculty of Engineering and Technology, University of Dhaka
- Location: Barisal Sadar Upazila, Bangladesh; 22.7024°N 90.4184°E
- Campus: Rural, 3.6 hectares (8.9 acres)
- Language: English
- Website: bec.edu.bd

Barishal Engineering College (BEC) is a public undergraduate college in the Barishal District of Bangladesh. It is constituent with the Faculty of Engineering and Technology of the University of Dhaka. The college enrolls 120 students per year.

== History ==
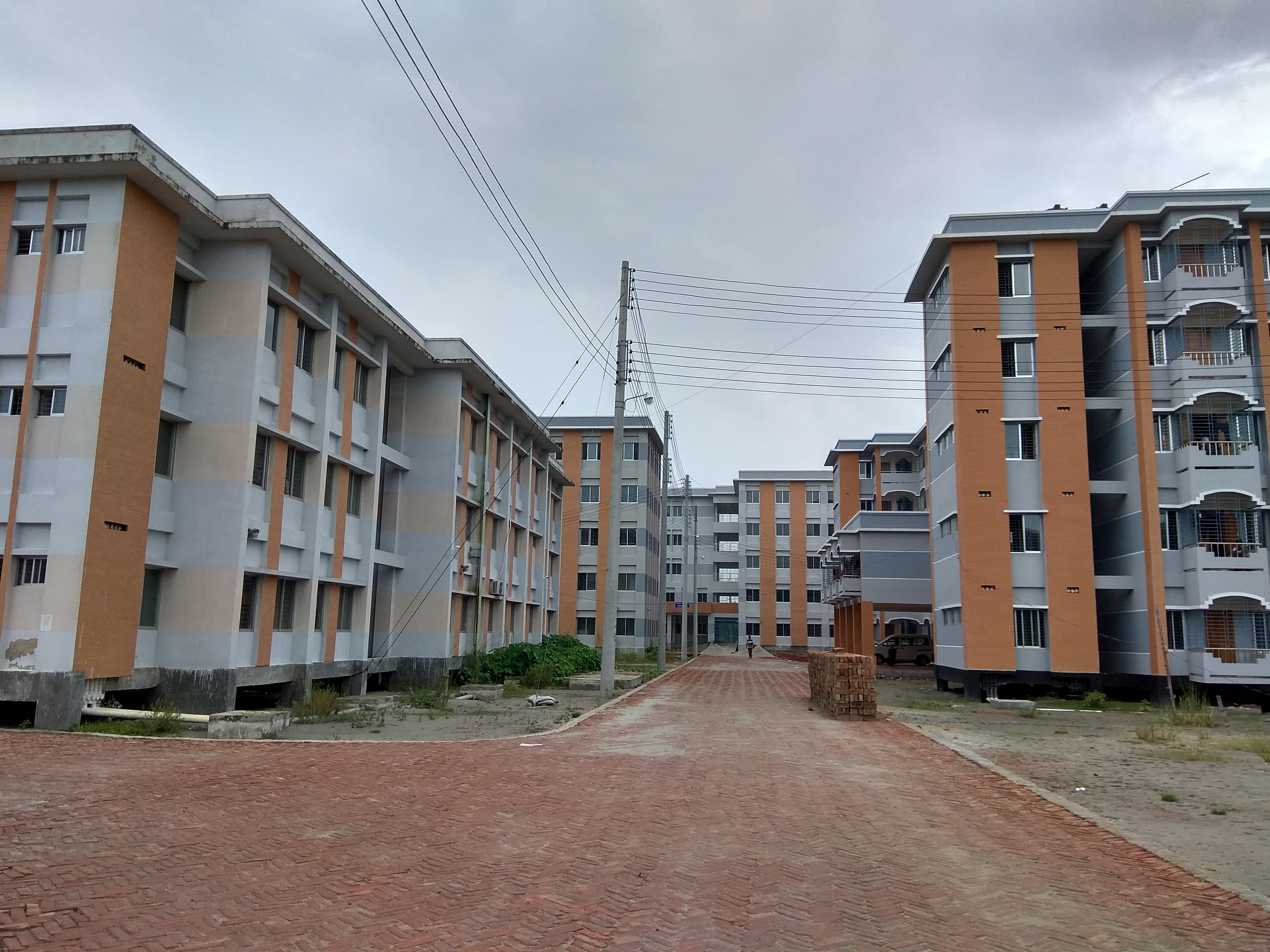
Barisal Engineering College, Bangladesh

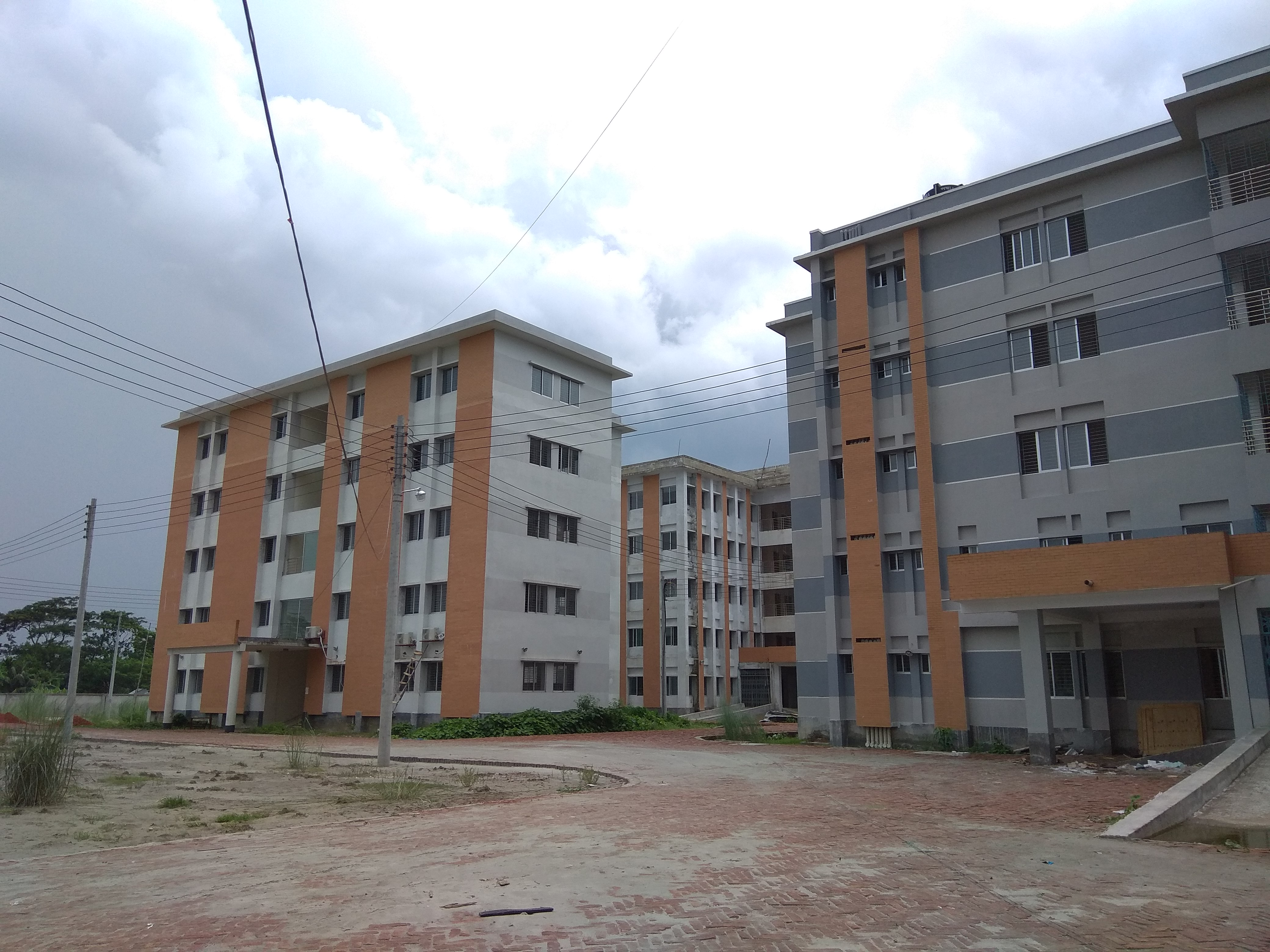
Barisal Engineering College Academic Building

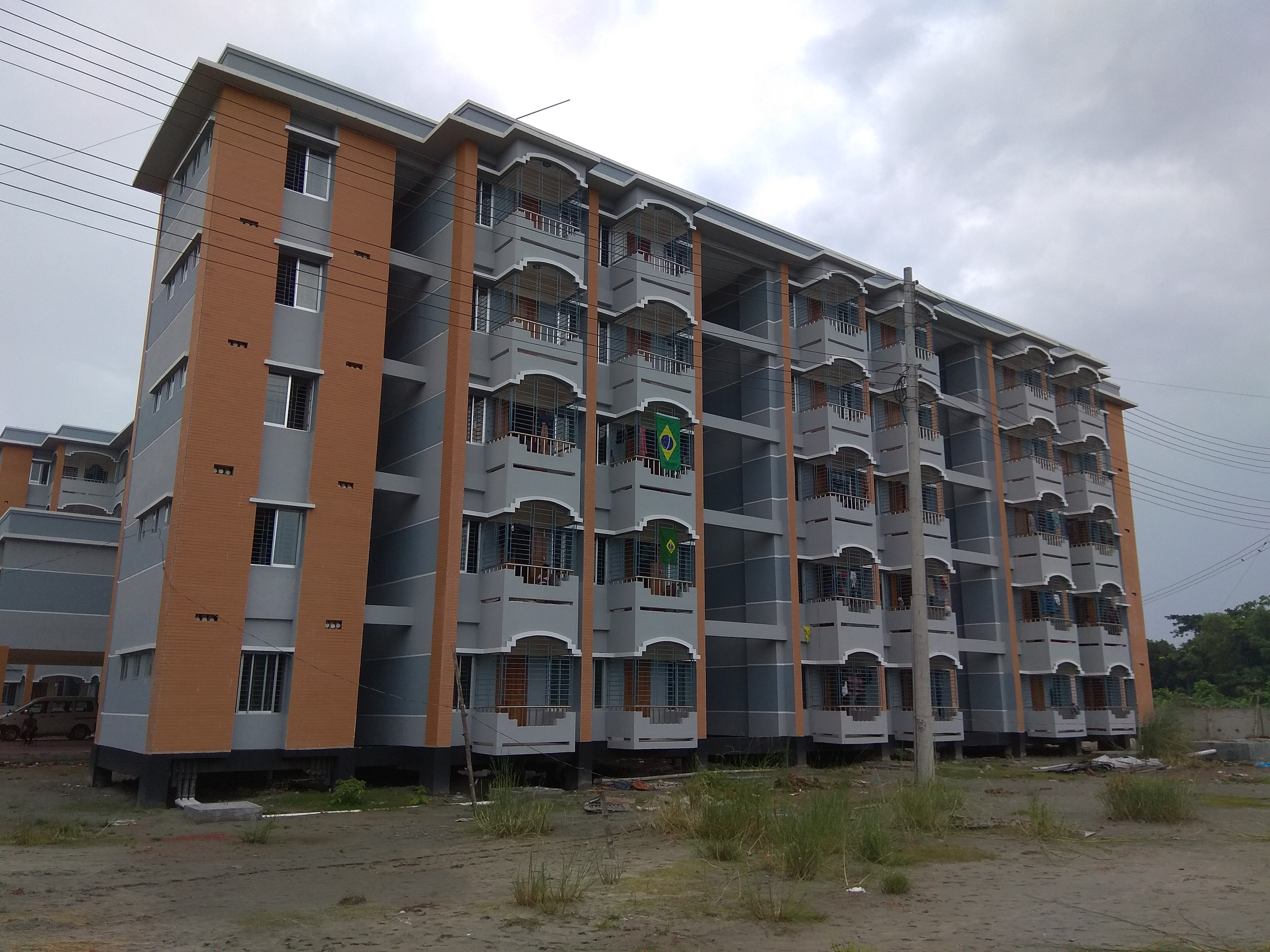
Barisal Engineering College Hostel

The establishment of Barishal Engineering College was undertaken as a government initiative to expand engineering education in the Barishal region. The government development project, titled Establishment of Barishal Engineering College (Bengali: বরিশাল ইঞ্জিনিয়ারিং কলেজ স্থাপন প্রকল্প), had a formal implementation period from July 2010 to June 2019. The project included the development of academic and administrative infrastructure, student hostels and residential facilities.

The college was developed on an 8-acre campus at North Durgapur, near the Barishal–Bhola Highway, approximately 13 kilometres east of Barishal city.

Barishal Engineering College was founded on 8 February 2018, following approval from the University of Dhaka. The college was established with the aim of expanding engineering education and providing undergraduate engineering education in the region.

In 2017, Barishal Engineering College was included in the University of Dhaka's list of constituent colleges. The college received approval on 16 November 2017 to admit students for the 2017–18 academic session under its affiliation with the University of Dhaka.

The first students were admitted in 2018 for the 2017–18 academic session. Academic activities initially began with undergraduate programmes in Civil Engineering and Electrical and Electronic Engineering, with an annual intake of 60 students in each department. Semester-based merit scholarships are awarded to 50% of admitted students, according to the college's institutional information.

The government development project was completed in June 2019. The government's completed-project record lists an estimated project cost of ৳9154.04 lakh and cumulative expenditure of ৳8469.41 lakh.

== Affiliation ==
Barisal Engineering College is constituent with University of Dhaka, under the Faculty of Engineering and Technology.

== Campus ==
The campus is spread over 8 acres with 14 buildings—including an administrative building, three faculty buildings, multipurpose building, three halls for students, two teachers dormitory buildings, two staff dormitory buildings & principal house. There are also power station, a pond and a playground.

Planned improvements include: playgrounds, a library (focusing on engineering texts), modern computer labs with fast internet access, and modern laboratory facilities.

== See also ==
- Faridpur Engineering College
- Mymensingh Engineering College
- Sylhet Engineering College
