= Collectorate Bhaban, Barishal =

Archaeological site located in Barishal District

Collectorate Bhaban
- কালেক্টরেট ভবন
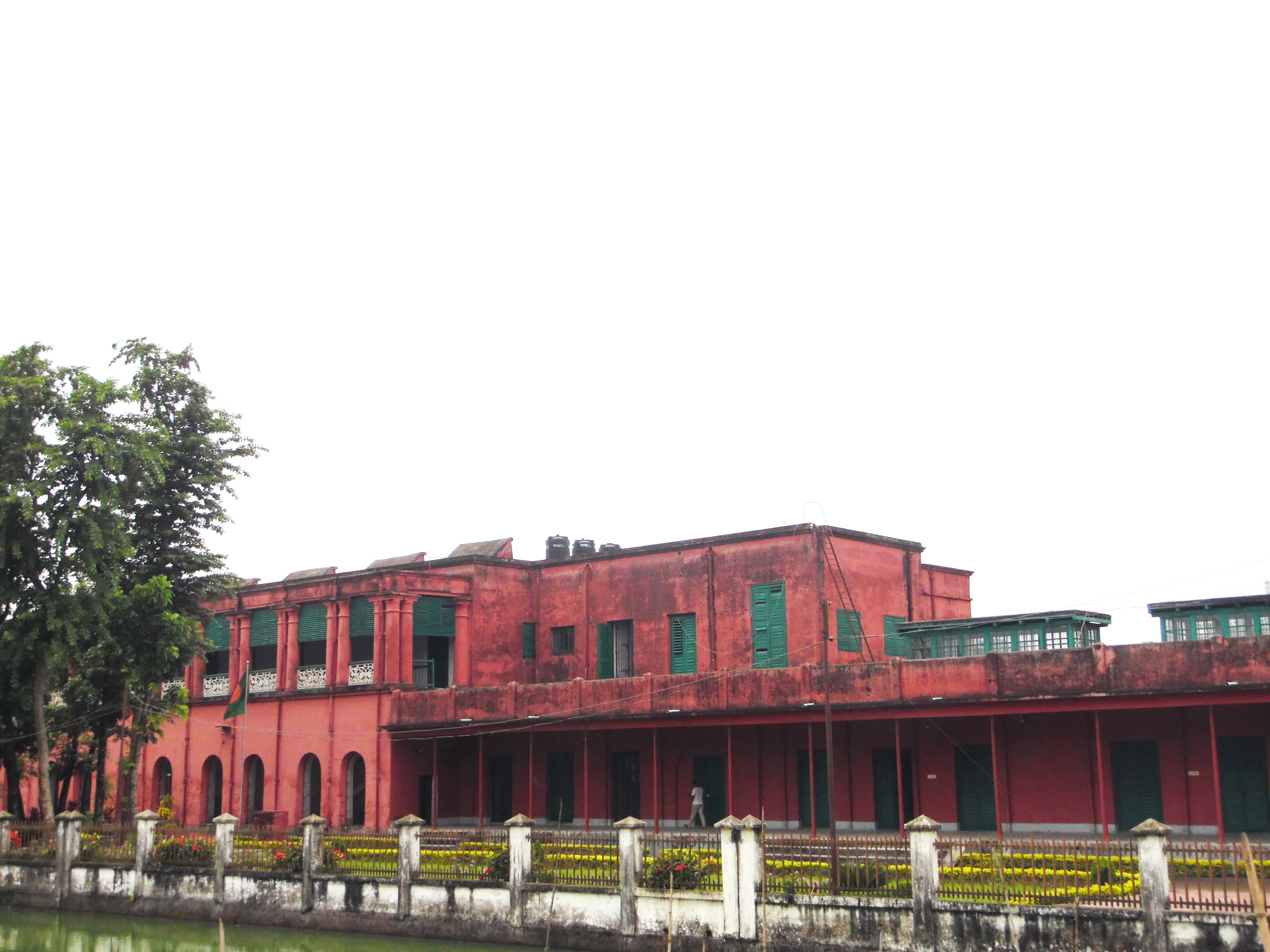
- Interactive map of the Collectorate Bhaban area

General information
- Location: Barisal Sadar Upazila, Barisal District, Bangladesh
- Opened: 1821
- Owner: Department of Archaeology

Height
- Height: 1.2 m (3 ft 11 in)

Technical details
- Size: 94x21 meter

Other information
- Number of rooms: 18

Barishal Collectorate Bhaban or Barisal Collectorate Bhaban is British colonial administrative building located in Sadar Upazila of Barisal District in Bangladesh. It is now classified as a protected site of the Department of Archaeology. The government of Bangladesh has turned the building into a museum named Barisal Divisional Museum which was inaugurated on 8 June 2015.

== History ==
The building was deemed unfit in 1979 and abandoned in 1984. The Government of Bangladesh published a gazette in 2004 declaring the building as a protected site. It was transferred to the Department of Archaeology in 2005. In 2012, the building underwent renovation and was declared a museum in 2015. It contains more than 200 different old furniture, stone statues, terracotta plaques, crafted bricks, old coins etc.

Built in 1821, it is believed to be the first government building in the country. During the British colonial period, important administrative activities were carried out from this building. In independent Bangladesh, the building became known as Barishal Deputy Commissioner's office. It is 91.44 meters in length and 27.43 meters wide. There are 18 rooms in the building.
