= Kirtankhola River =

Watercourse in Bangladesh

Coordinates: 22.71°N 90.39°E

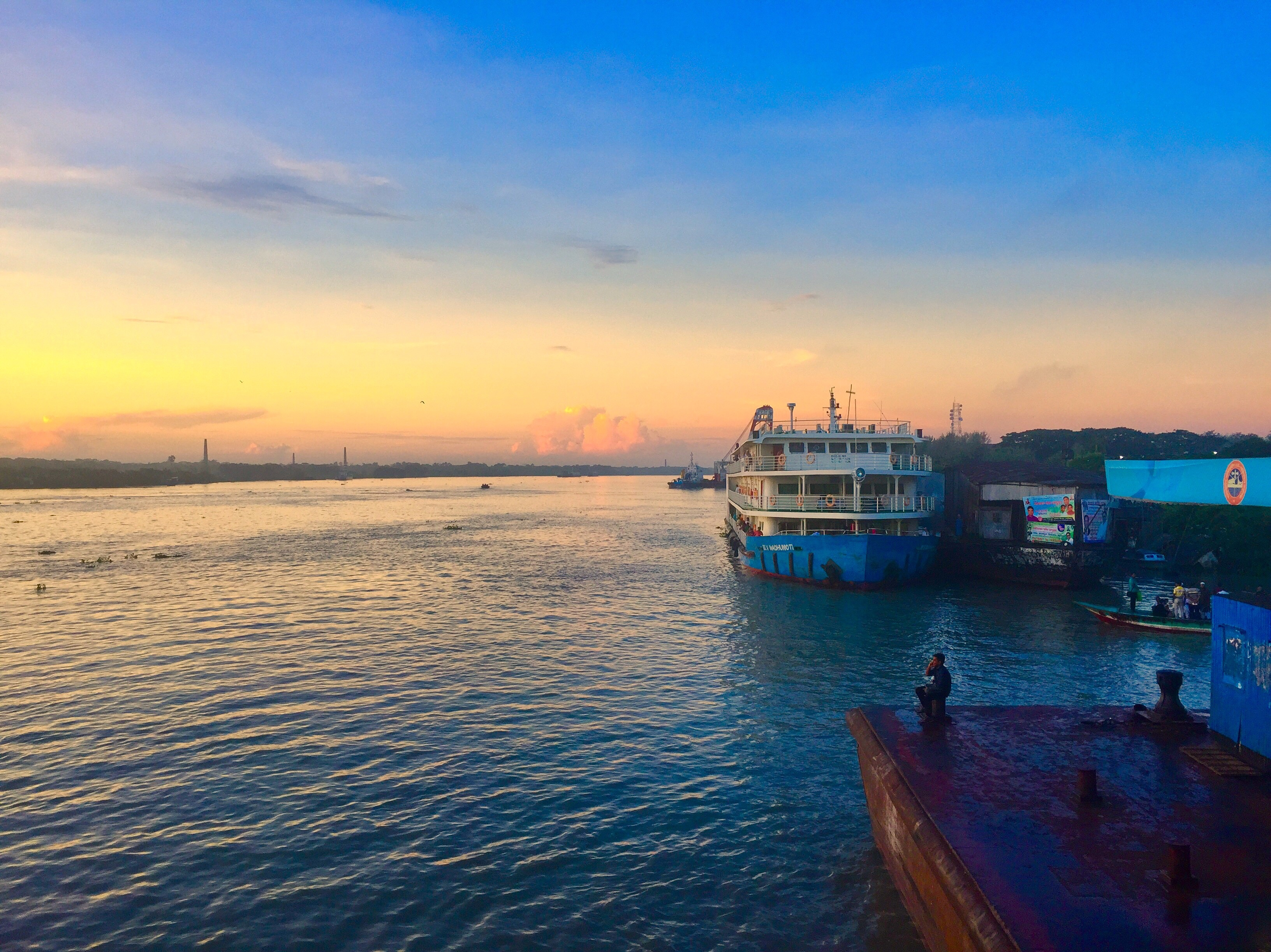
Kirtankhola River, Barisal

The Kirtankhola (Bengali: কীর্তনখোলা) is a river that starts at Sayeshtabad, in the district of Barisal, Bangladesh, and ends in Gajalia, near the Gabkhan canal. The total length of the river is about 160 kilometres (99 mi). Waste dumping, to the tune of 50 tons every day, by one account, has jeopardized the biodiversity of the river and its connected canals.

== See also ==
- List of rivers of Bangladesh
