= Momenshahi Cantonment =

Bangladeshi military cantonment

Coordinates: 24°45′14″N 90°24′11″E

- মোমেনশাহী সেনানিবাস
- Mymensingh, Mymensingh Division, Bangladesh

Site information
- Type: Cantonment
- Controlled by: Bangladesh Army

Momenshahi Cantonment (also known as Mymensingh Cantonment) is a military installation, situated at the heart of Mymensingh. It was a former HQ of 19th Infantry Division of Bangladesh Army. Currently, it includes the headquarters of Army Training and Doctrine Command, which consists of its Battle Group within the cantonment. The 77th Infantry Brigade under the 19th Infantry Division is also located in the cantonment. The first General Officer Commanding of ARTDOC was Major General Md Zia-Ur-Rahman.

== Installations ==
- HQ Army Training and Doctrine Command
  - 403rd Battle Group
    - 27th Bangladesh Infantry Regiment
    - 34th Independent Field Artillery Battery
    - 45th Independent Field Engineers Company
    - 99th Independent Division Support Company

Commands under 19th Infantry Division

- 77th Infantry Brigade
  - 11th East Bengal Regiment
  - 29th Bangladesh Infantry Regiment
  - 15th Bangladesh Infantry Regiment
- Station Headquarters, Mymensingh
  - SSD, Mymensingh
  - Combined Military Hospital, Mymensingh
  - Static Signal Company, Mymensingh
  - OSP -1
- 4th Field Artillery Regiment
- 81st Brigade Signal Company
- 89th Field EME Workshop

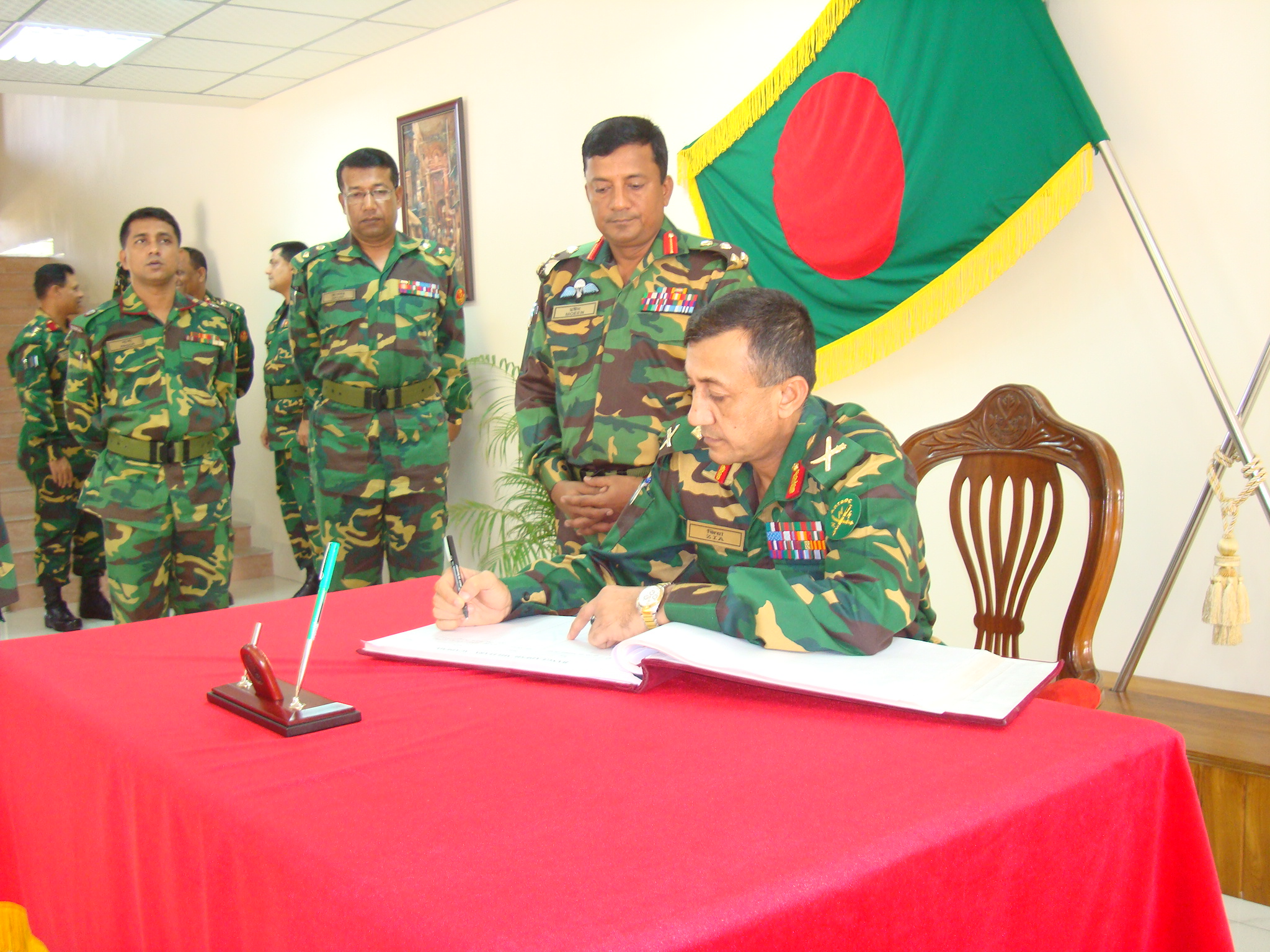
Former GOC of ARTDOC Major General Md Zia-Ur-Rahman

== Education ==
- Cantonment Public School and College, Momenshahi
- Cantonment Board High School, Momenshahi Cantonment
- Mymensingh International School (MIS)

== See also ==
- Military of Bangladesh
