= ARTDOC =

Army Training and Doctrine Command
- সেনাবাহিনী প্রশিক্ষণ ও মতবাদ অধিদাপ্তর
- Insignia of ARTDOC
- Active: 25 July 2007 – present
- Country: Bangladesh
- Branch: Bangladesh Army
- Garrison/HQ: Momenshahi Cantonment

Commanders
- Current commander: Vacant
- Notable commanders: Major General Anwar Hossain; Lieutenant General Hasan Sarwardy; Lieutenant General Aziz Ahmed; Lieutenant General Shafiuddin; Lieutenant General Matiur Rahman

Army Training and Doctrine Command (Note: Bengali: সেনাবাহিনী প্রশিক্ষণ ও মতবাদ অধিদাপ্তর) also known as ARTDOC is a research-oriented formation of the Bangladesh Army. Its headquarters is located in Momenshahi Cantonment, Mymensingh. It is charged with overseeing training evaluation and reforms; weapon, equipment and force modernization; development of concepts and doctrine revision. It consists of its headquarters, battle group and all the training institutions of the Bangladesh Army. The first General Officer Commanding of ARTDOC was Maj. Gen Muhammad Zia-Ur-Rahman.

== Mission ==
The official mission statement for ARTDOC is to prepare Bangladesh Army for war and be the architect of its future.

== History ==
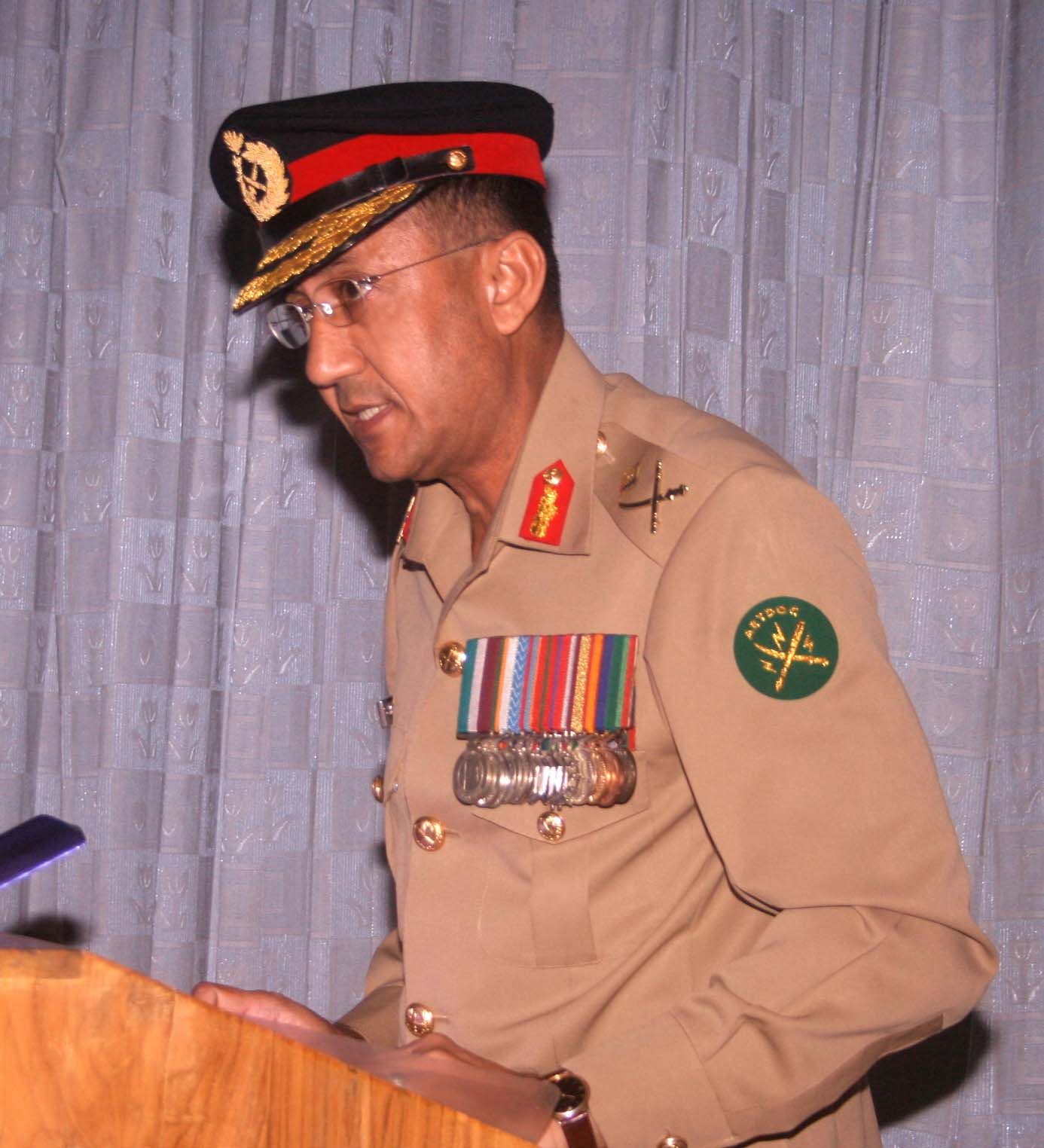
Maj. Gen. Muhammad Zia-Ur-Rahman was the pioneer General Officer Commanding of ARTDOC.

In the past, the Military Training (MT) Directorate at Army Headquarters (AHQ) was responsible for carrying out different types of research works related to training of the Bangladesh Army. However, due to limited resources and a mild manpower shortage, they couldn't do any comprehensive research and study in the field of doctrine and development.

To heavily strengthen the research and development capability for strategic, operational, tactical and technological enhancement, and to keep up with continual changes in the complexities of the battlefield scenario, rapid technological advancement, The Bangladesh Army raised ARTDOC on 25 July 2007 to develop its training and operational standards with special emphasis on research and development in the related fields.

== Training Institutions ==
ARTDOC acts as the nodal agency of all institutional training. Bangladesh Army has 20 different training facilities to train officers and men of all arms and services.

- Artillery Centre and School
- Armoured Corps Centre and School
- East Bengal Regimental Centre
- Engineer Center and School of Military Engineering
- Signals Training Center and School
- Army Medical Corps Centre and School
- School of Electrical Mechanical Engineering
- Ordnance Center and School
- Army Service Corps Centre and School
- School of Military Intelligence
- Army School of Music
- Army School of Physical Training and Sports
- Bangladesh Institute of Peace Support Operation Training
- Bangladesh Infantry Regimental Centre
- School of Infantry and Tactics
- Bangladesh Military Academy
- Army School of Education and Administration
- Corps of Military Police Centre and school
- Non-Commissioned Officer's Academy
- Army War Game Centre
- 403 Battle Group
- Army Hill & Jungle Warfare School

== Visits ==
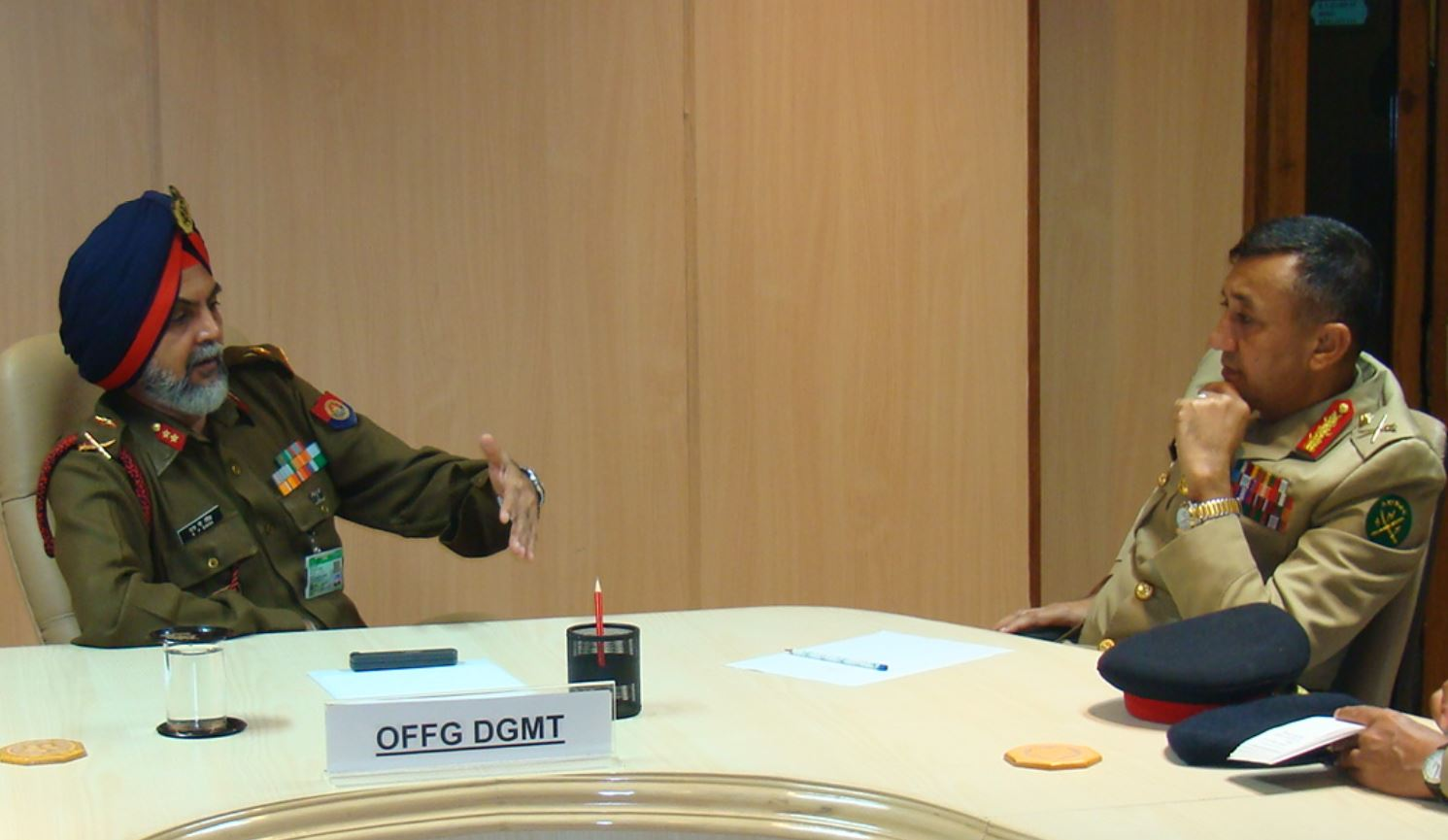

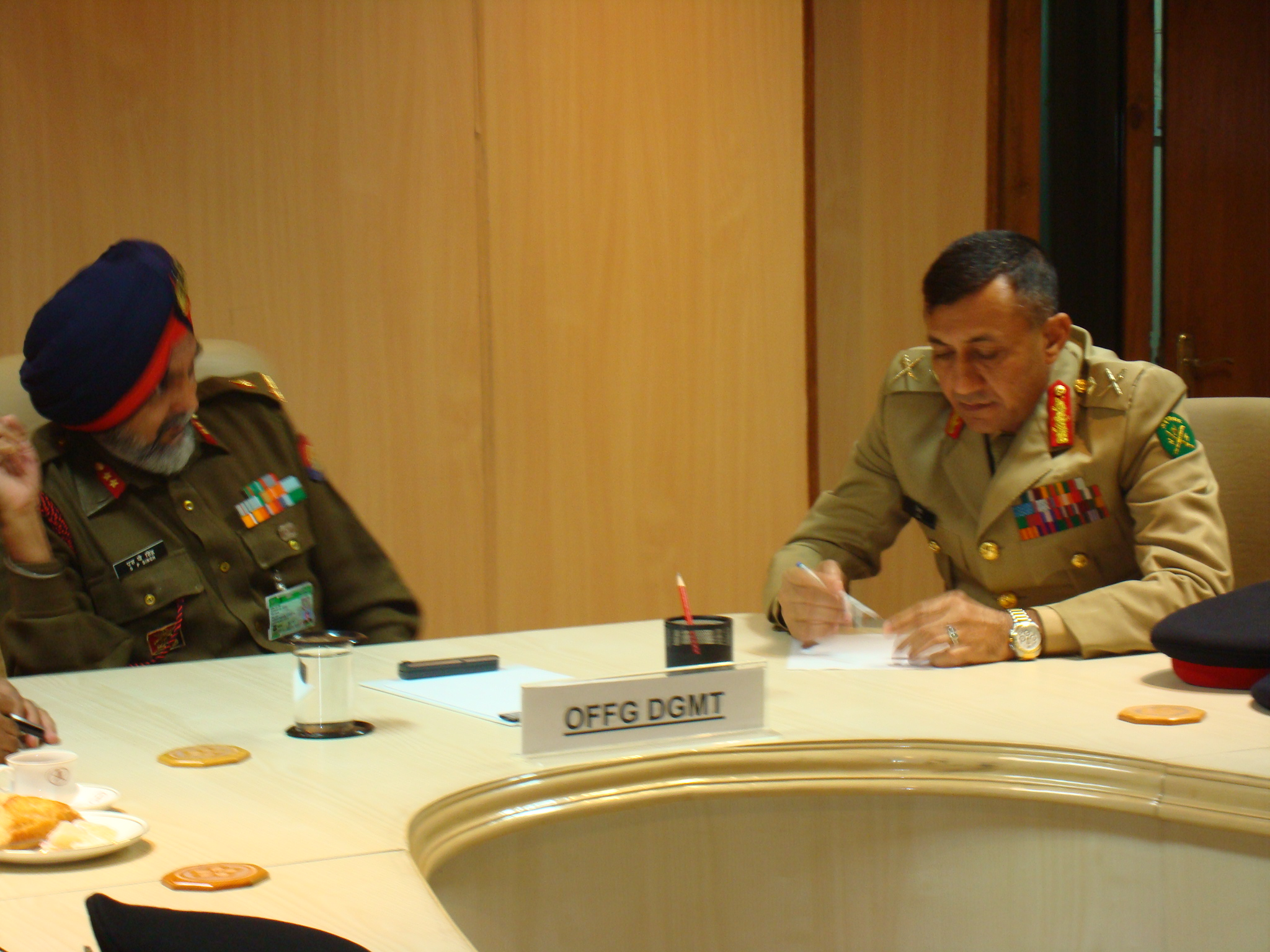

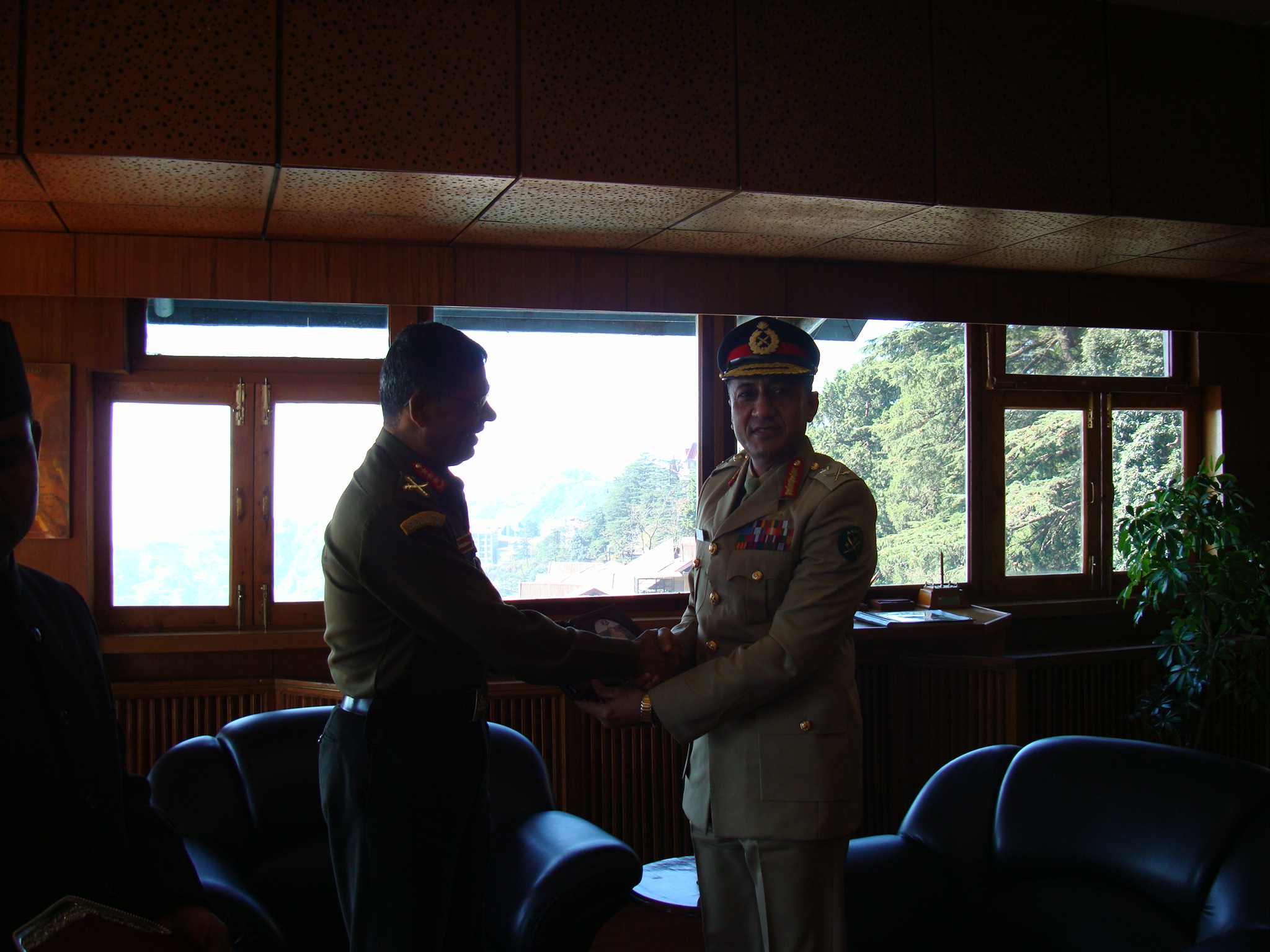

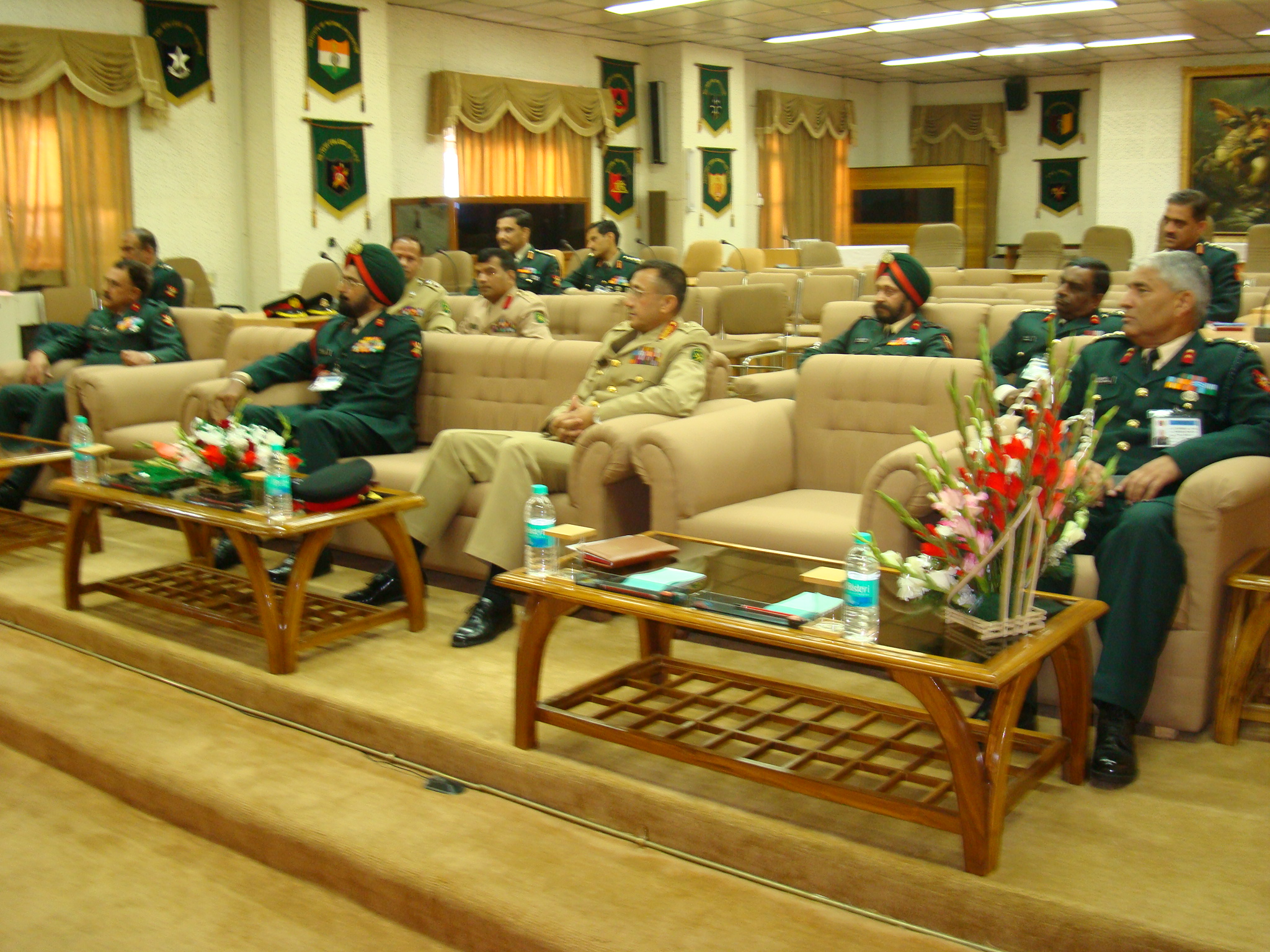

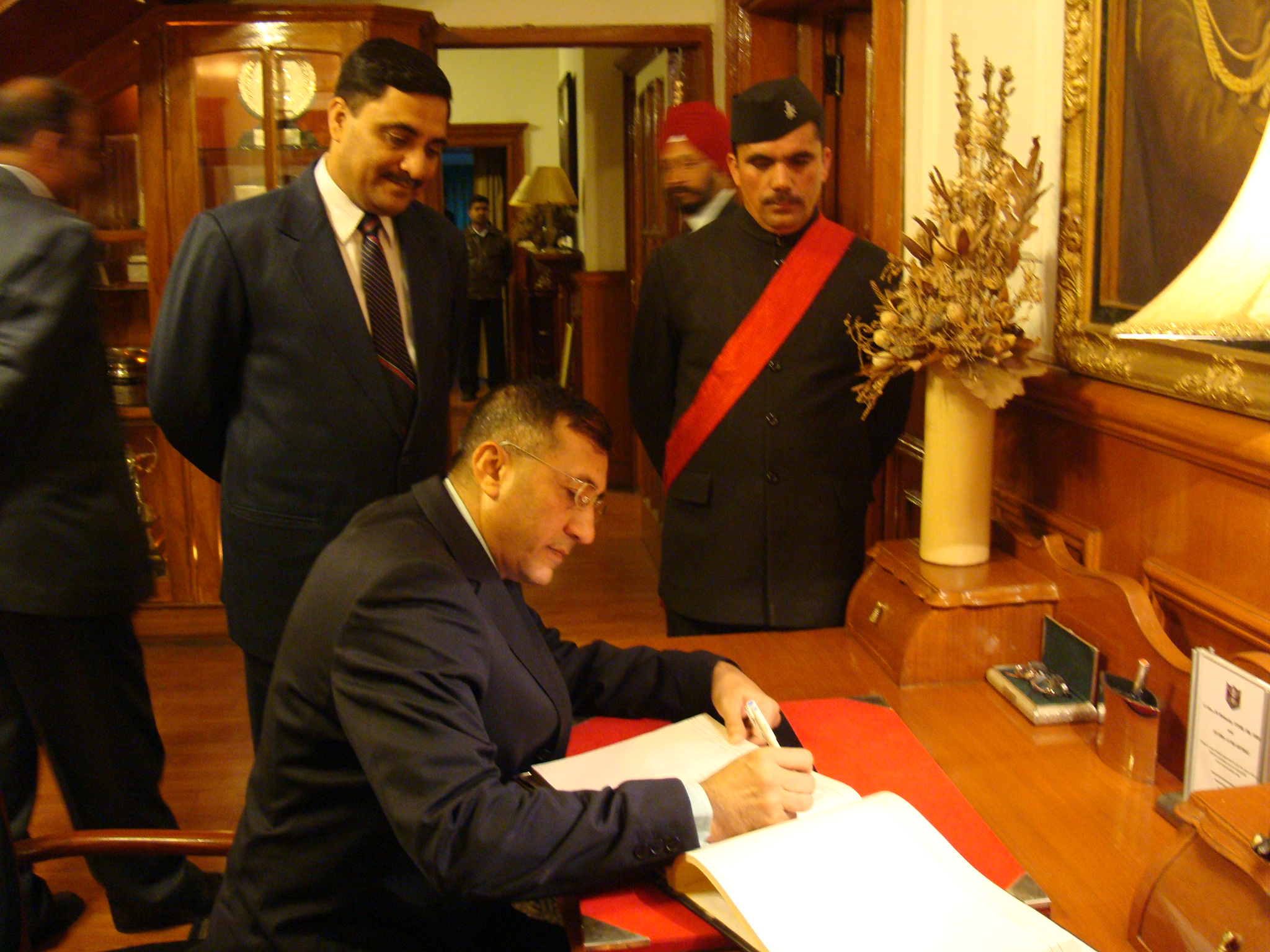

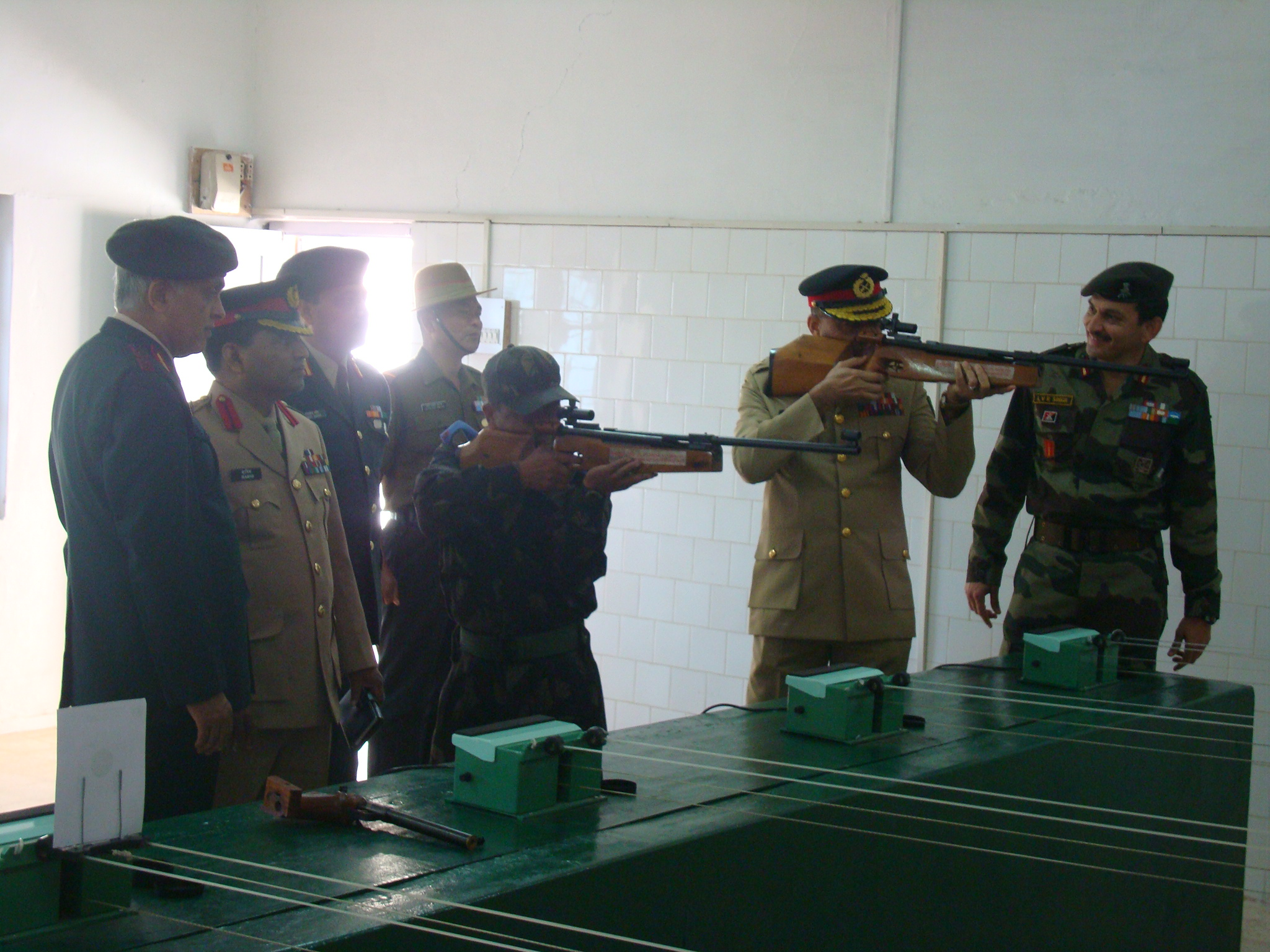

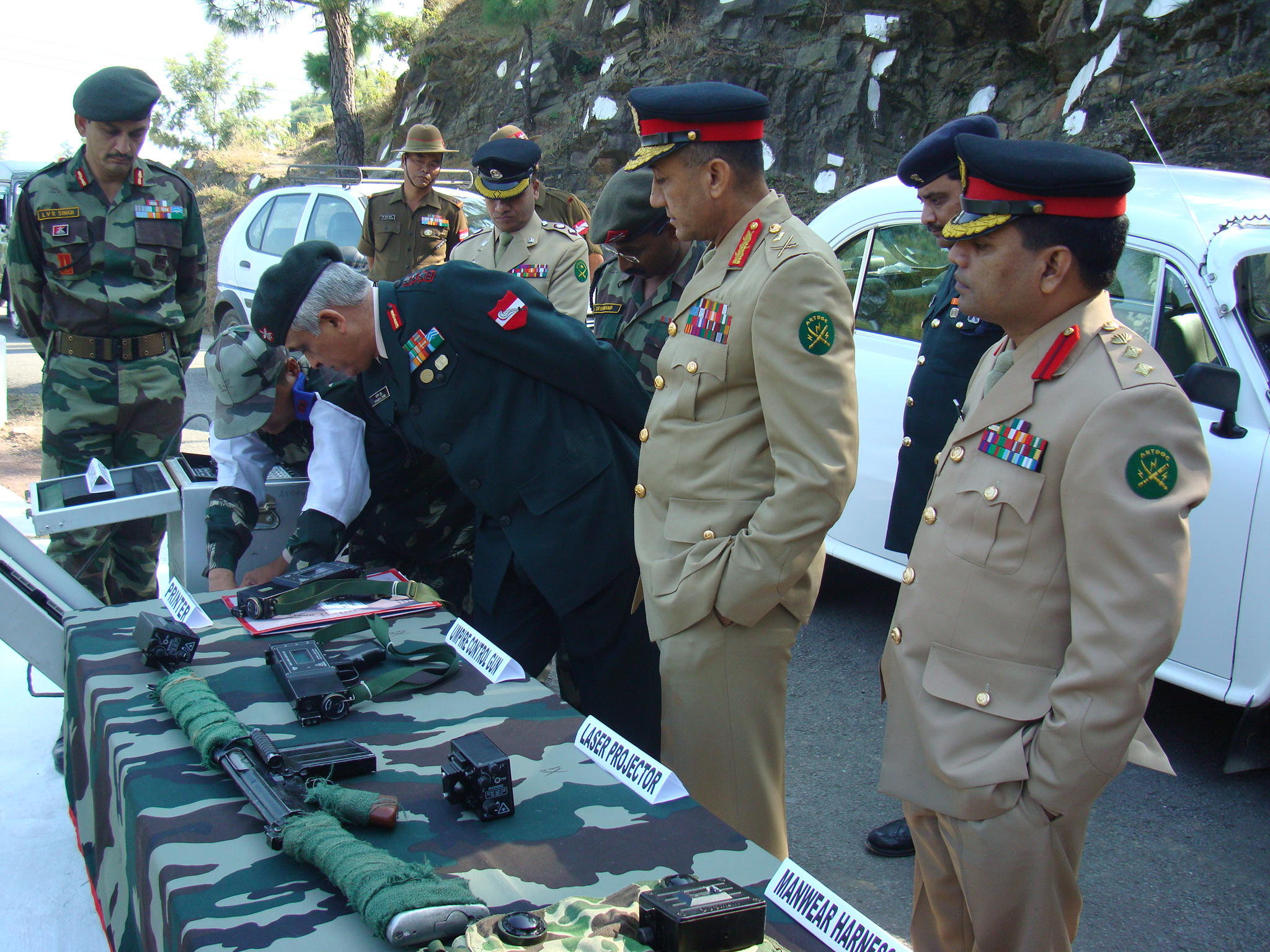

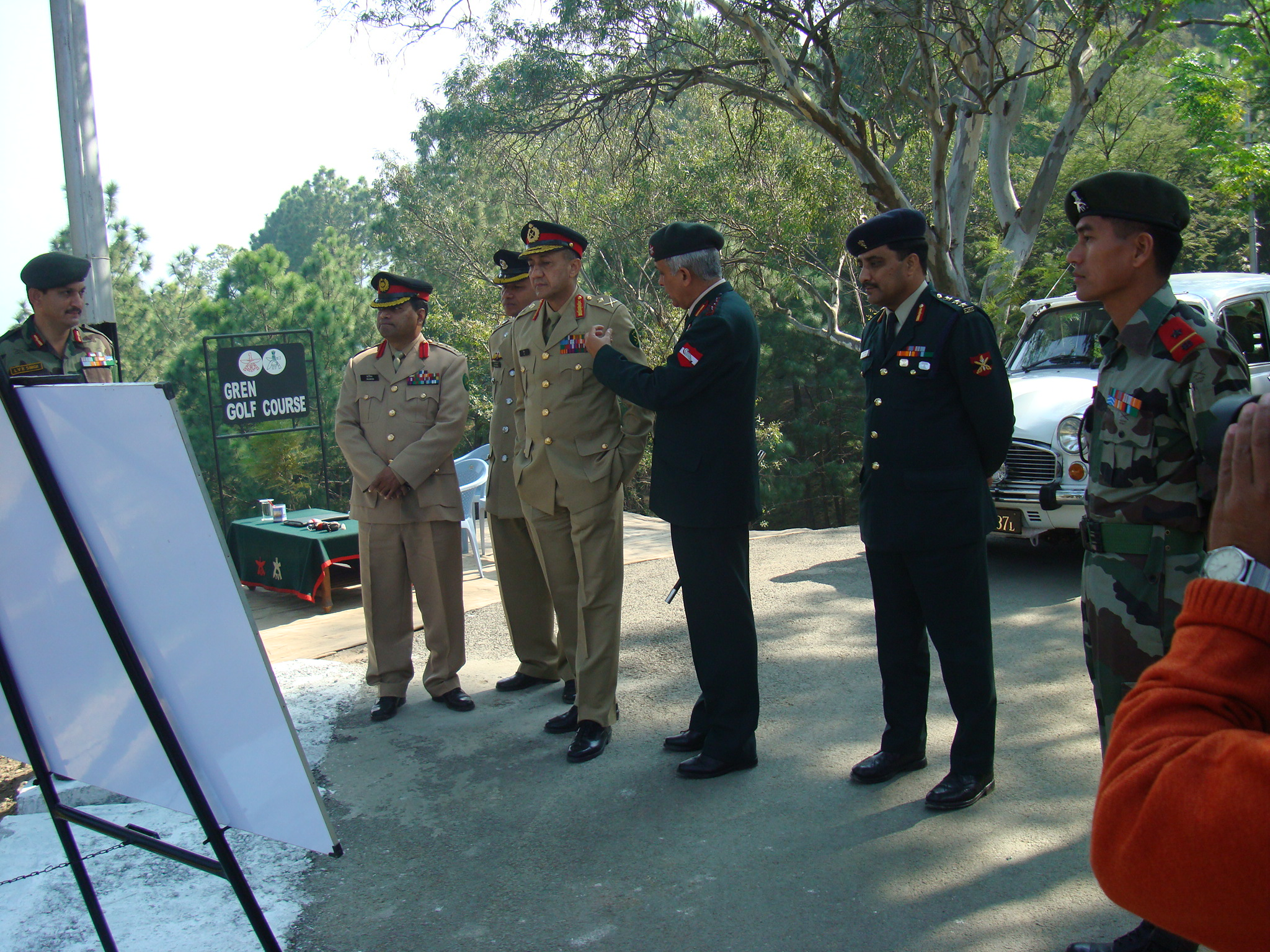

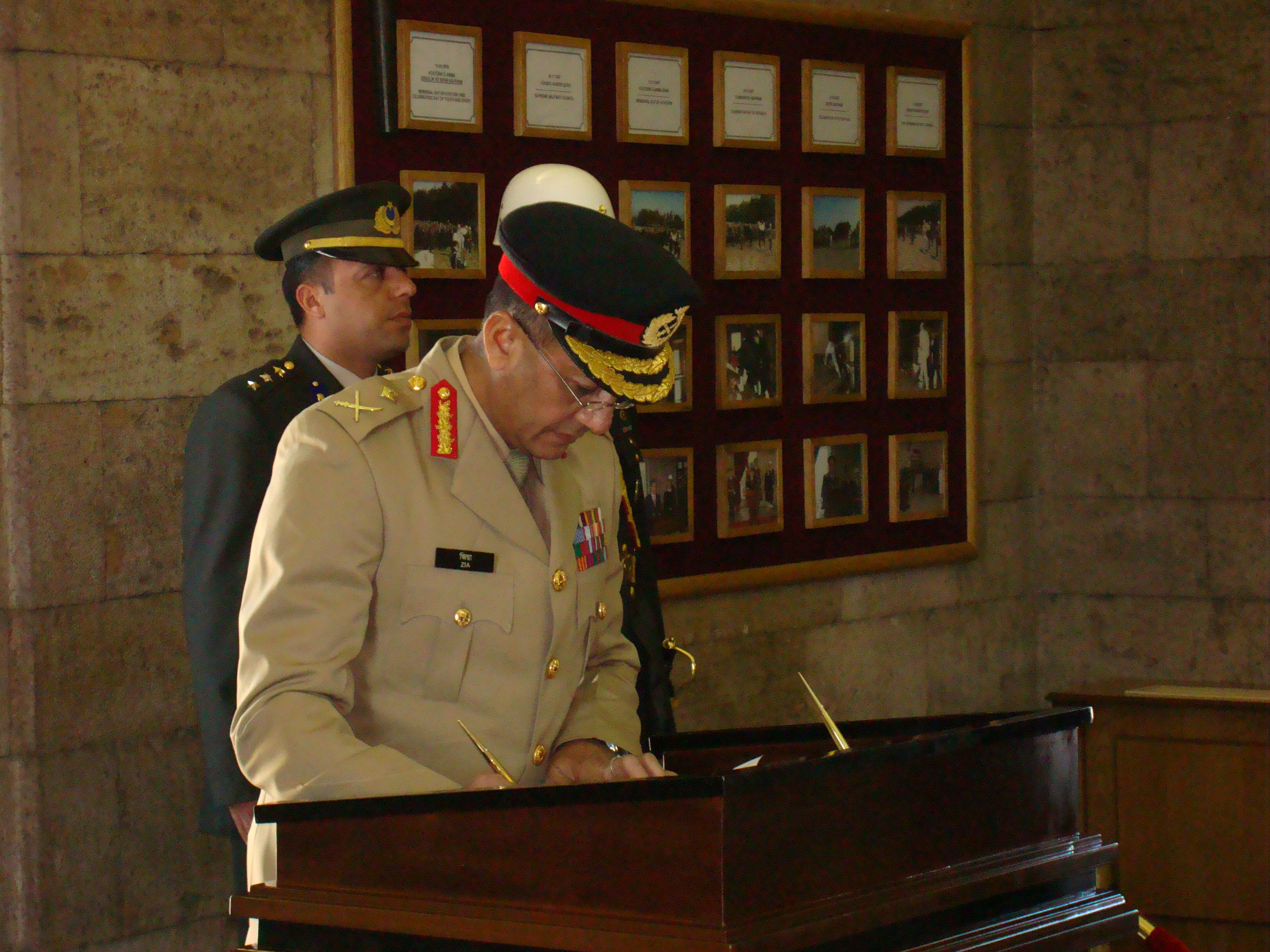

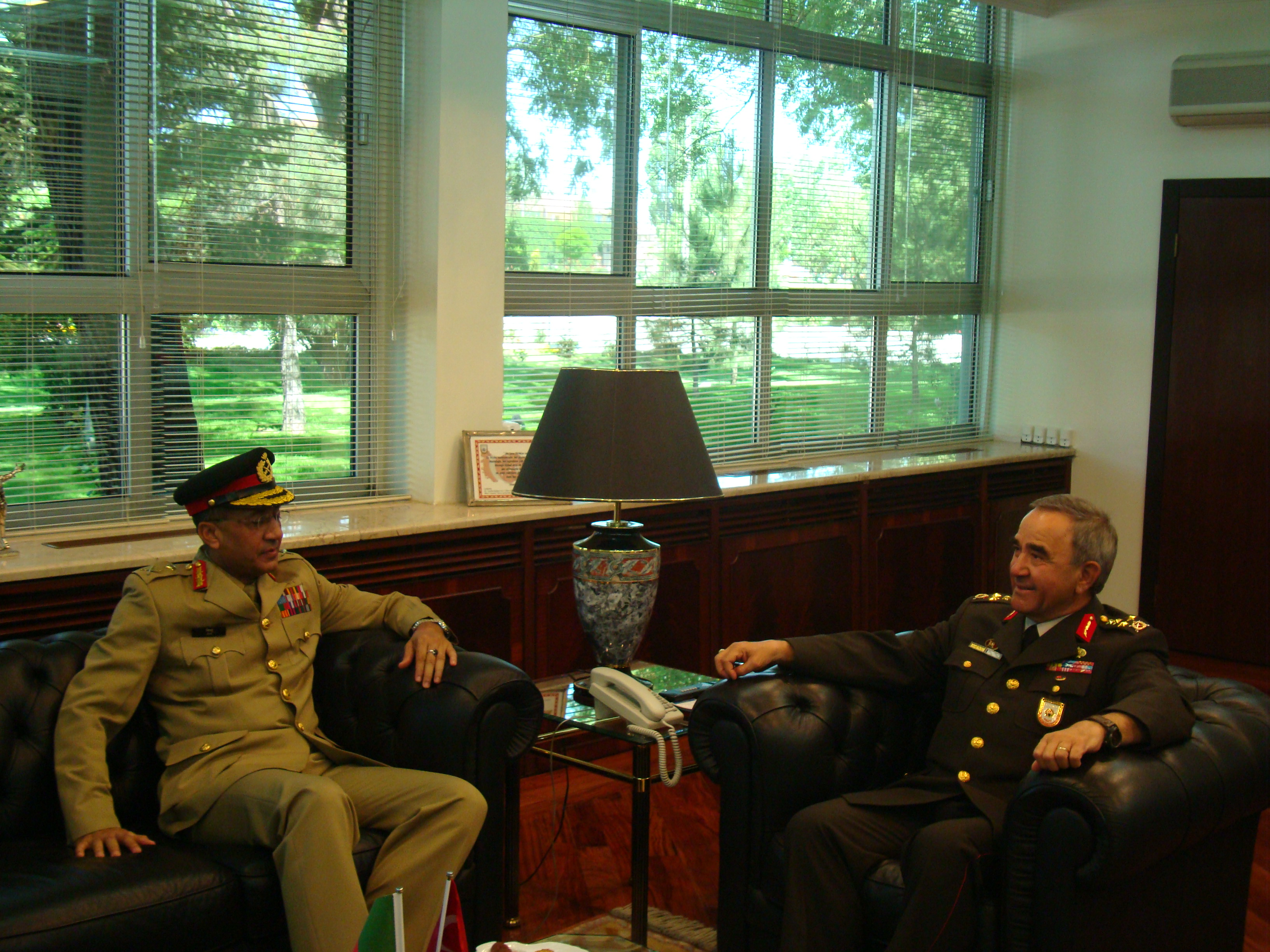

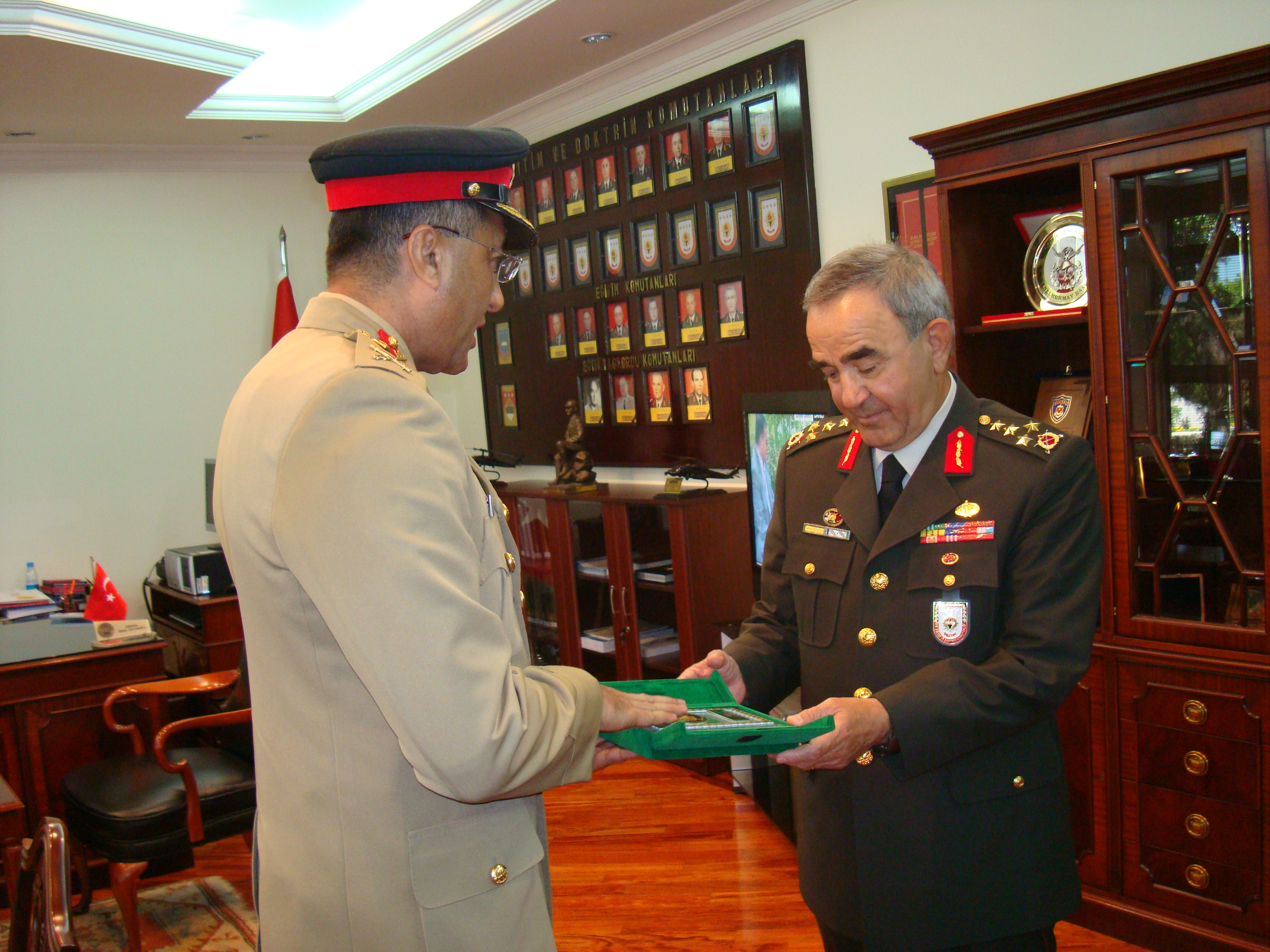

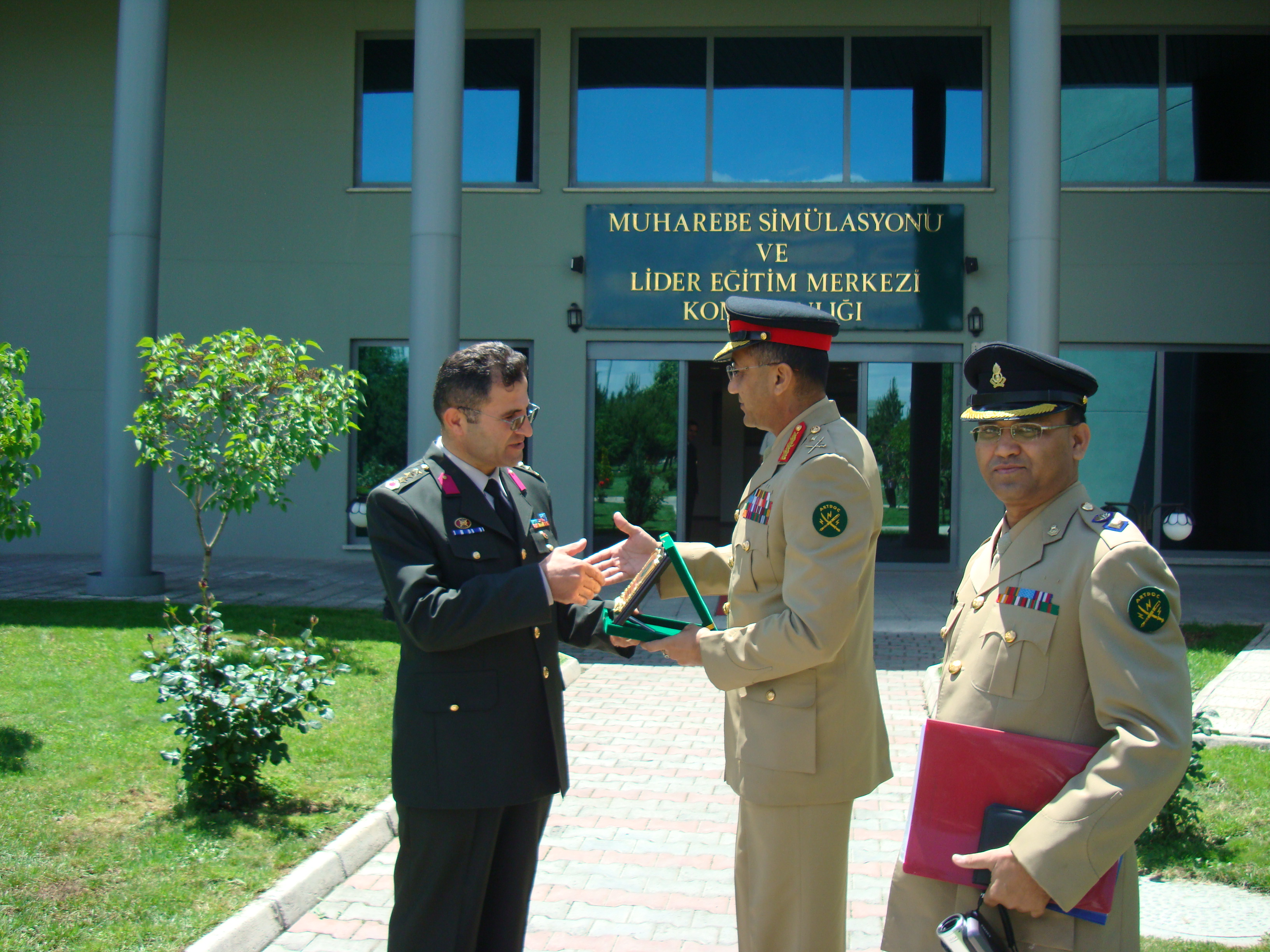

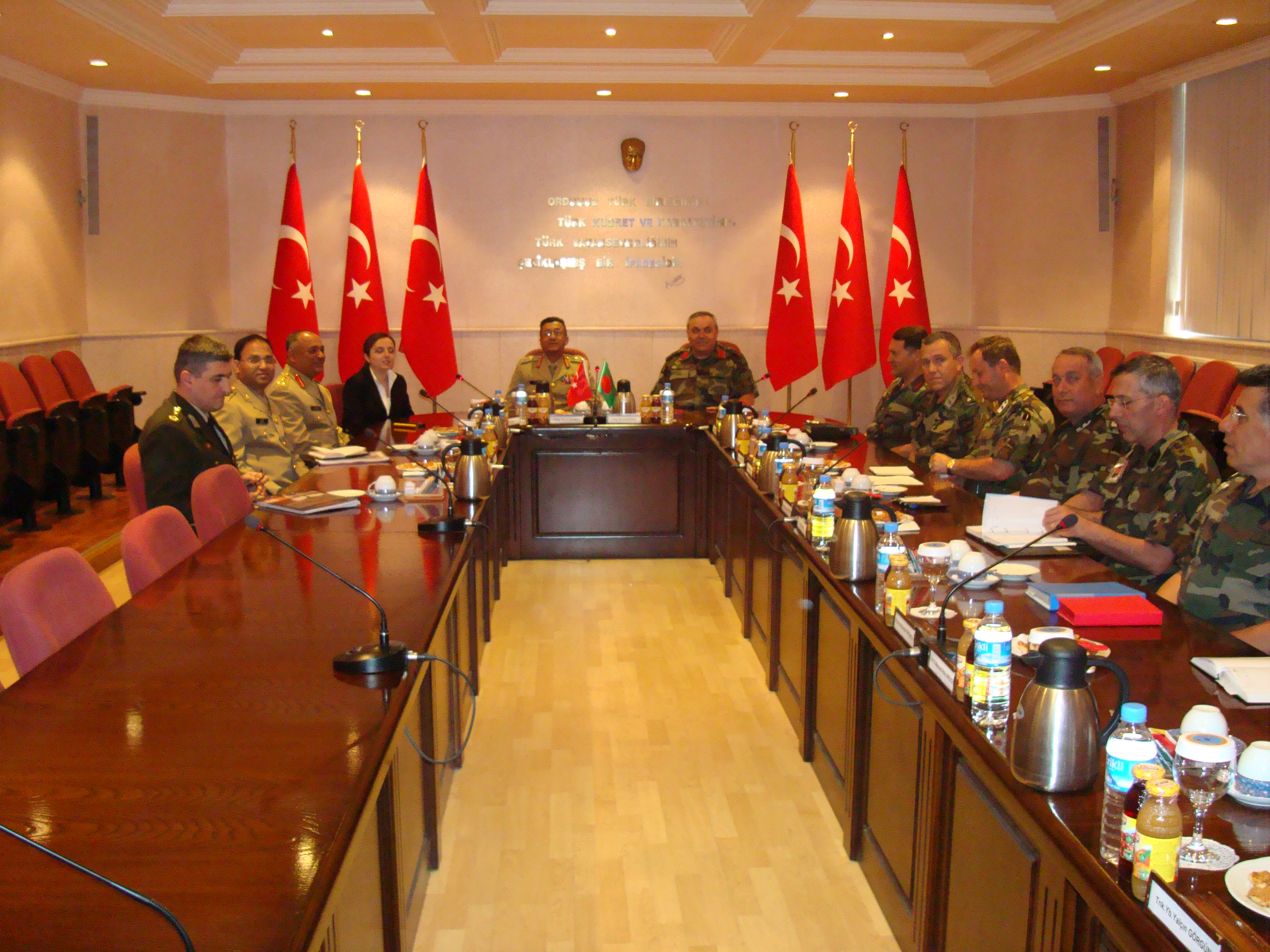

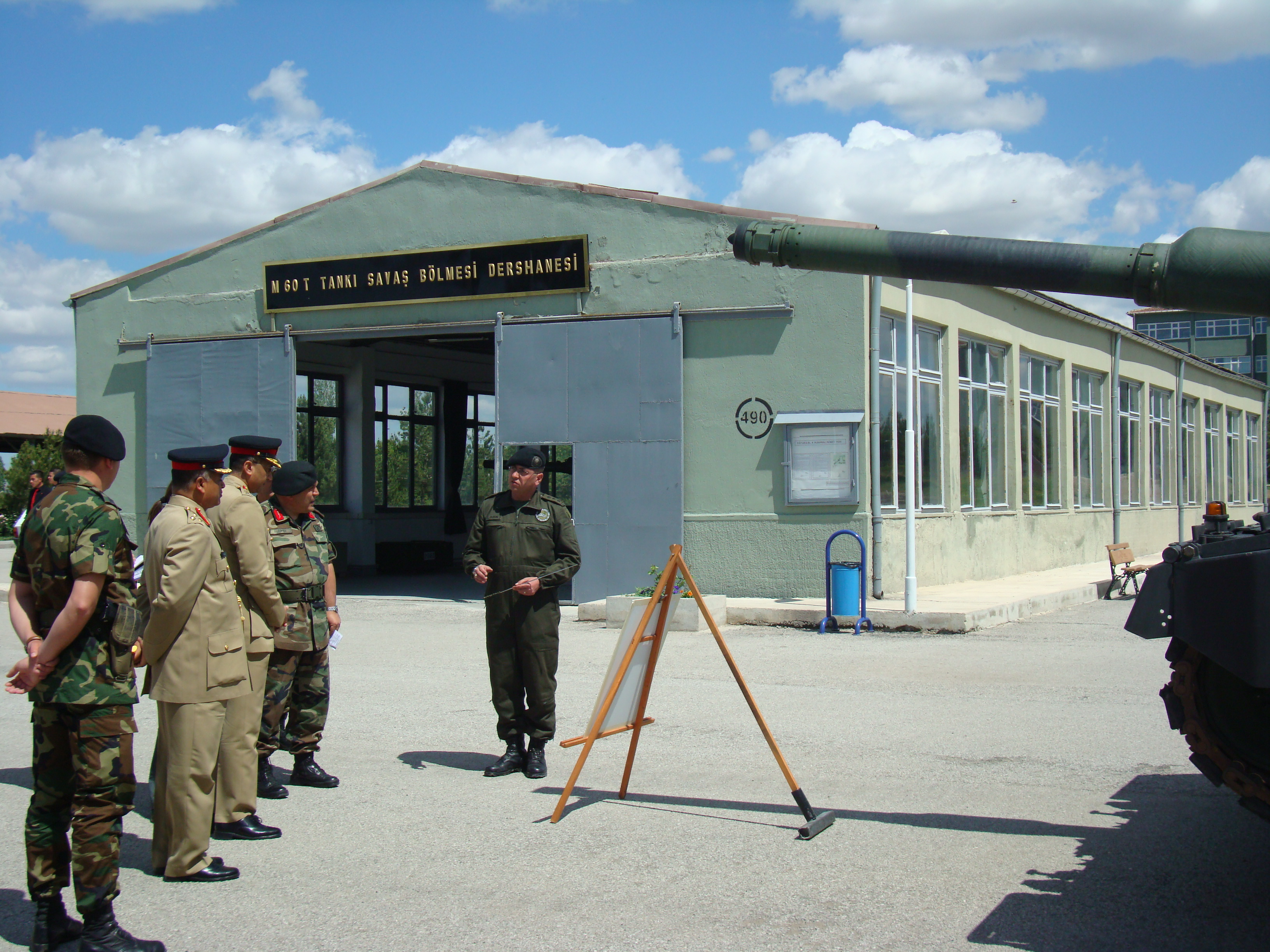

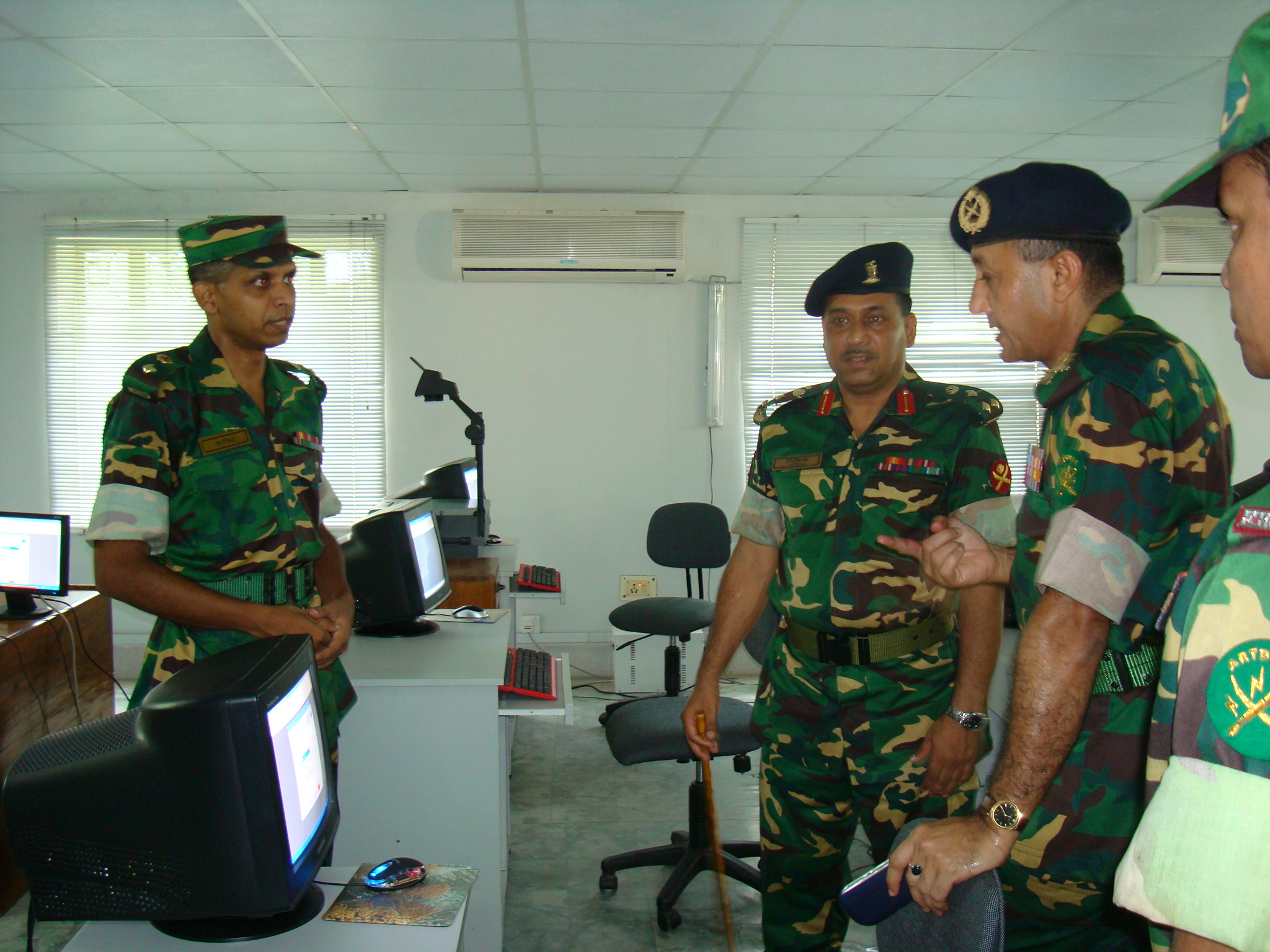

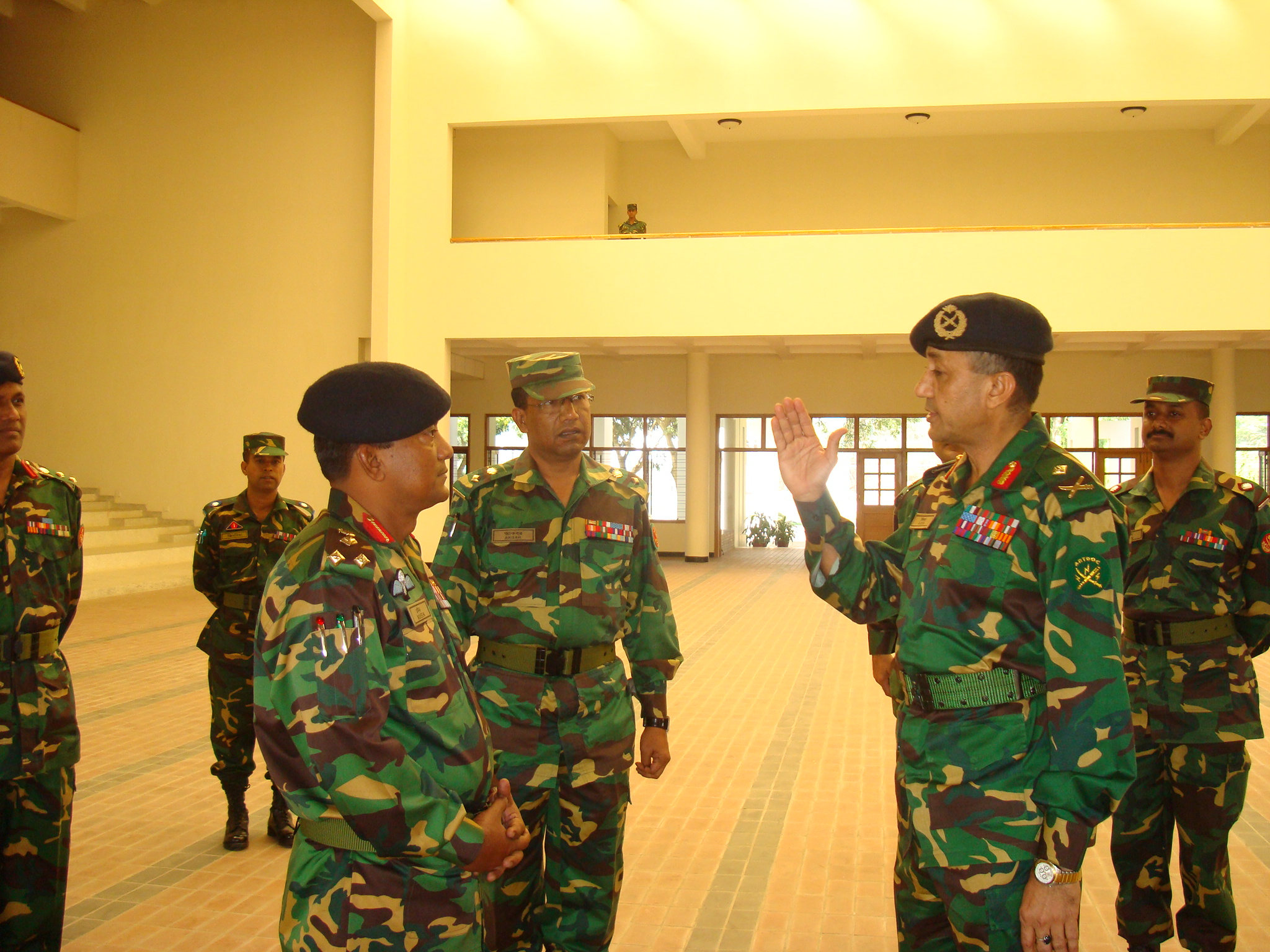

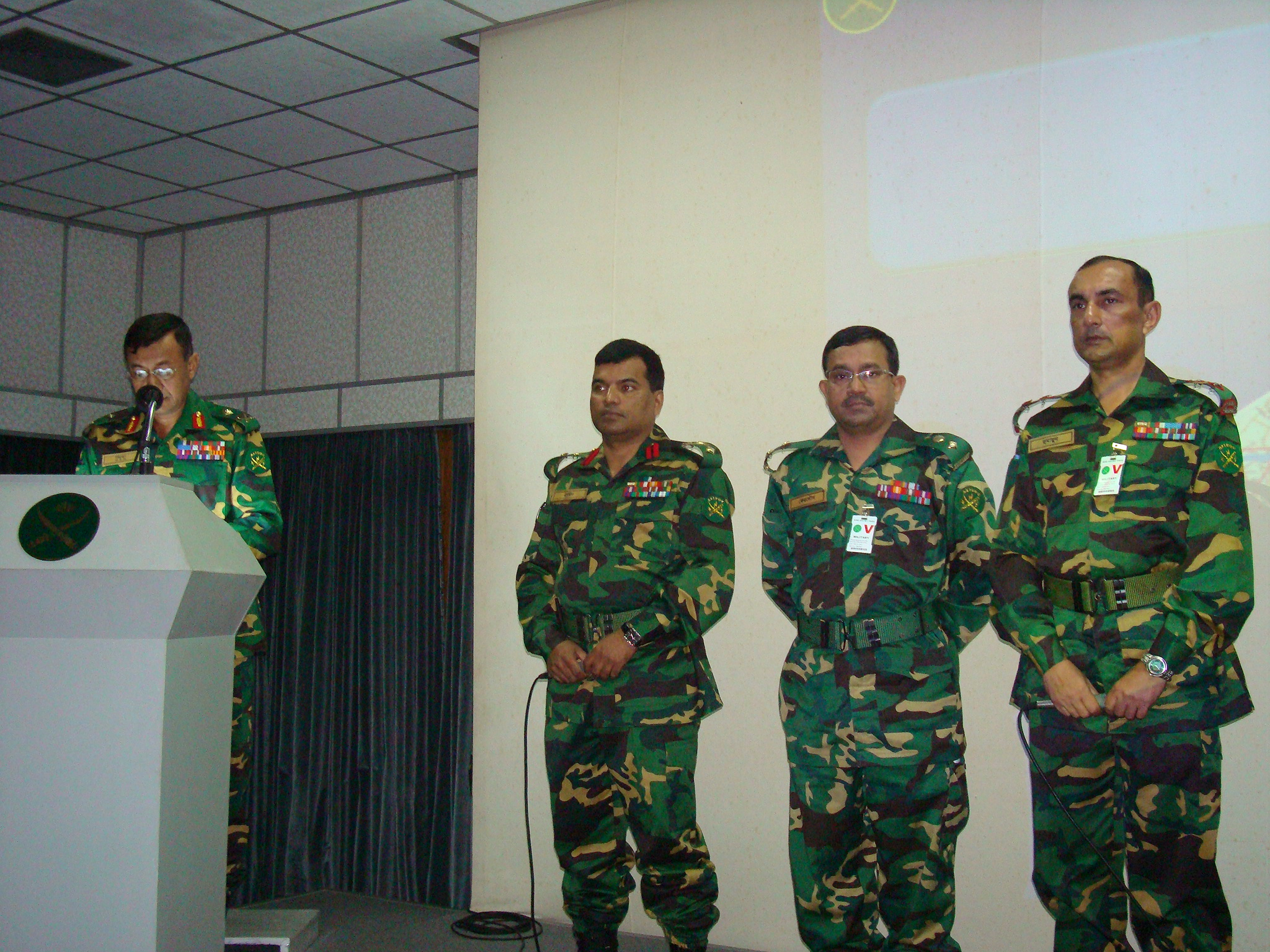

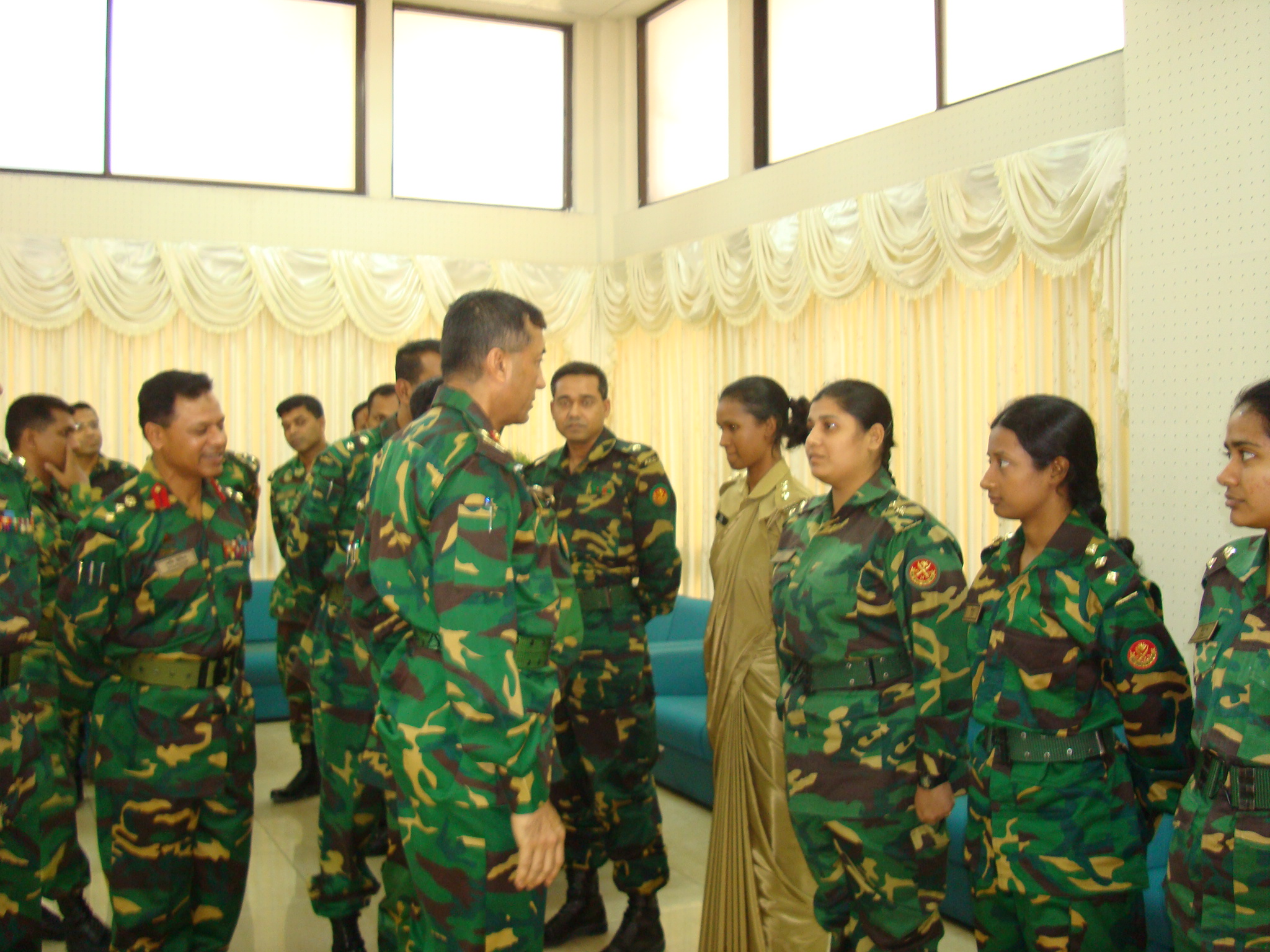

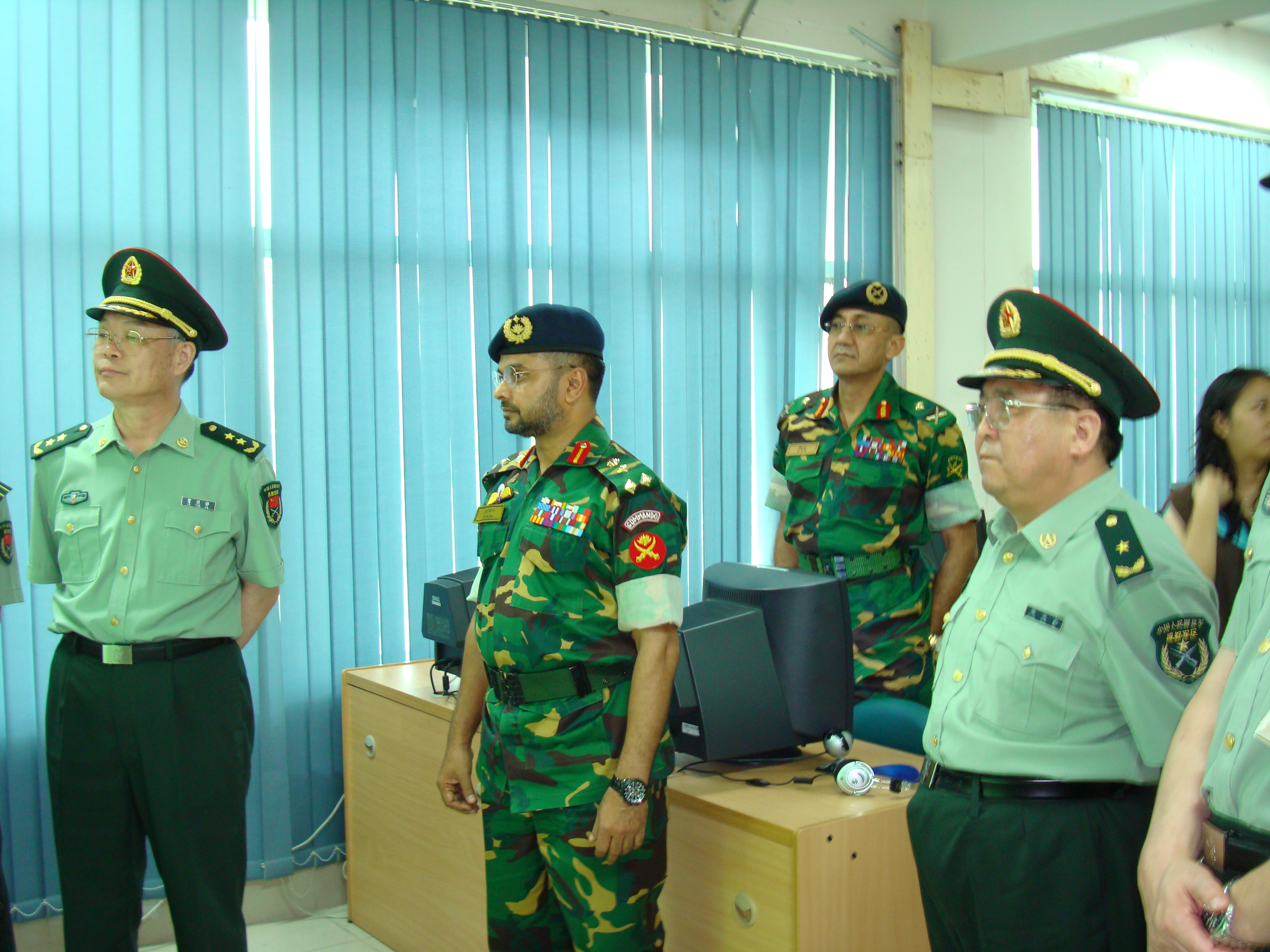

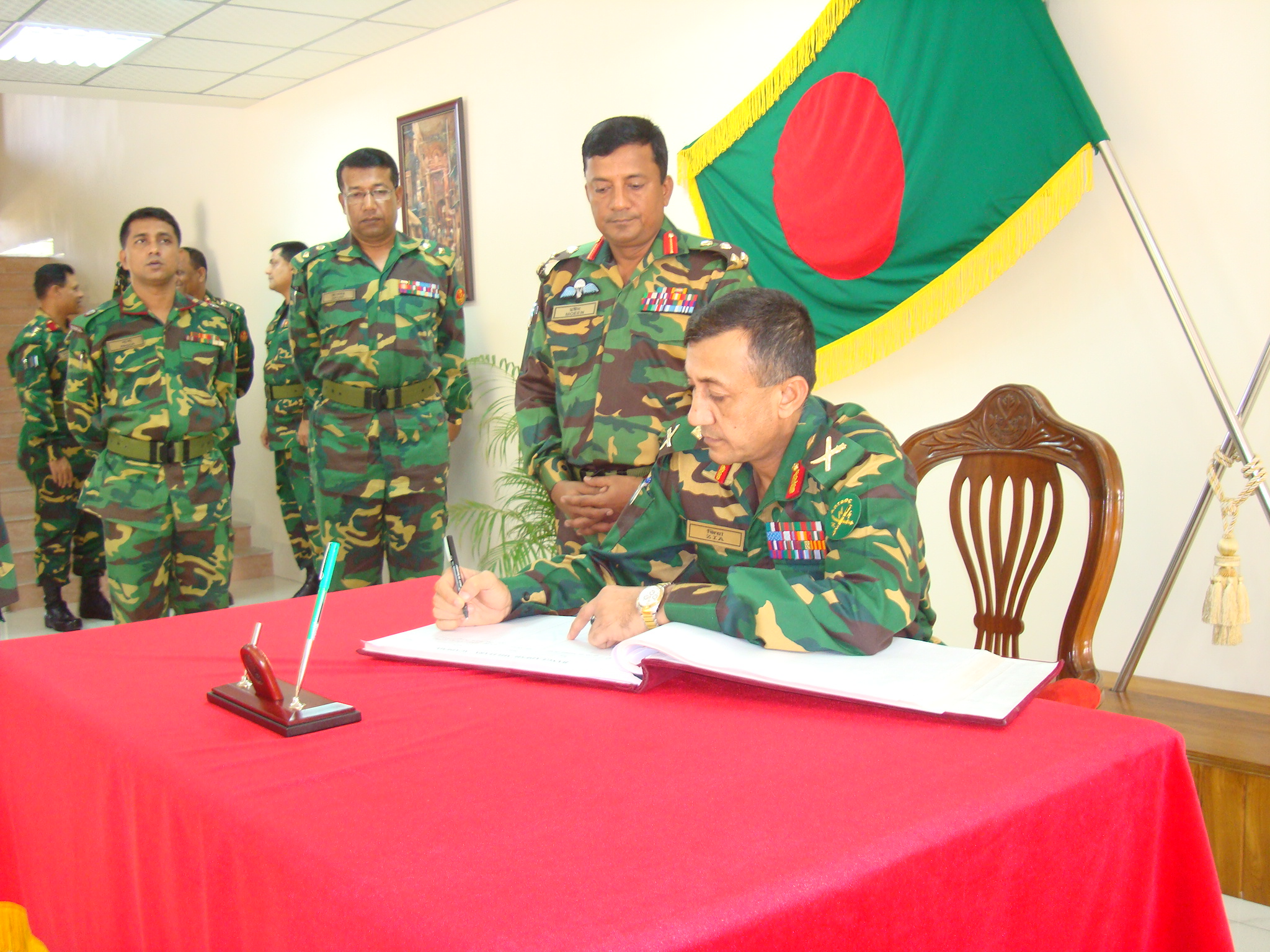

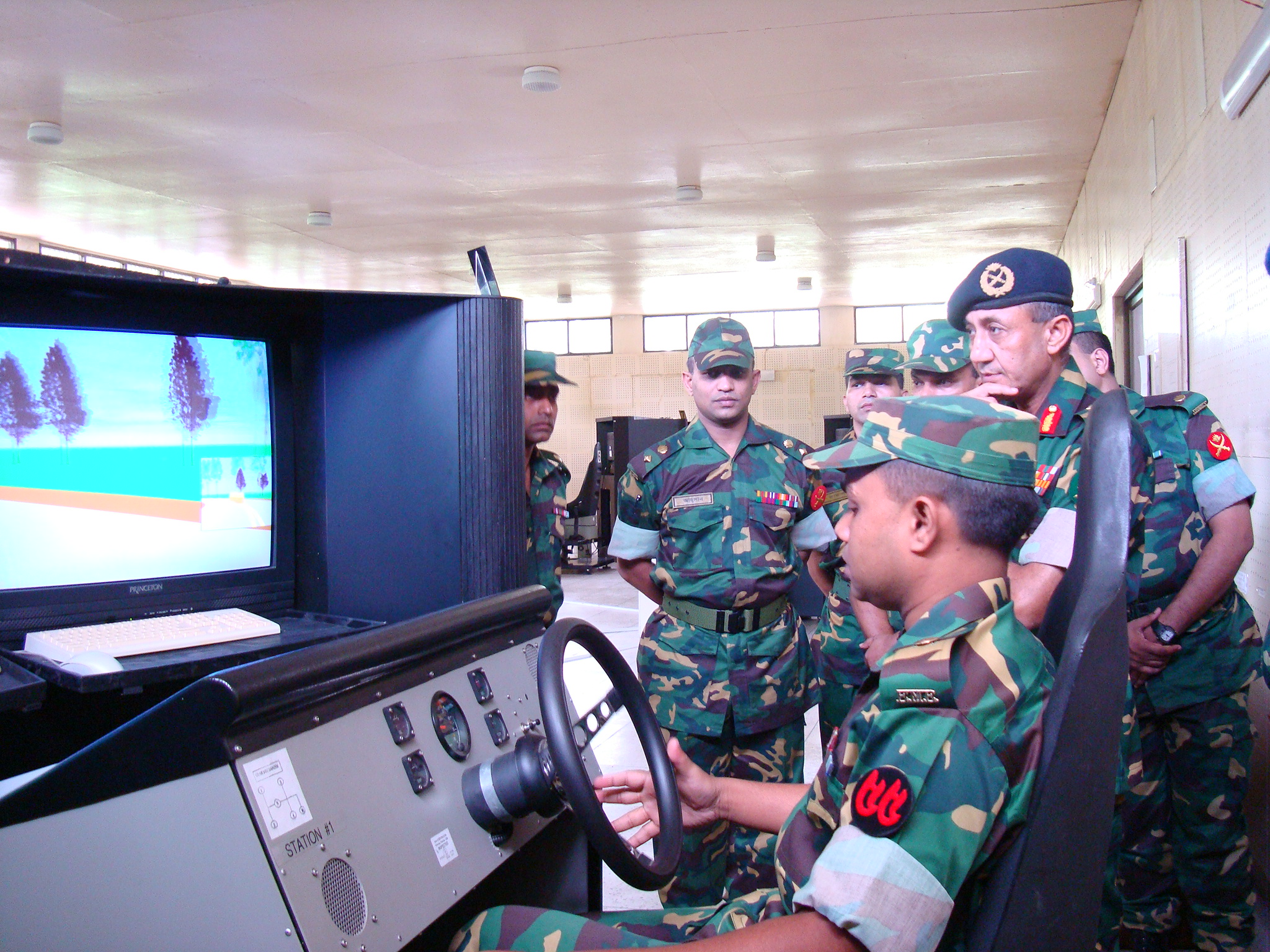

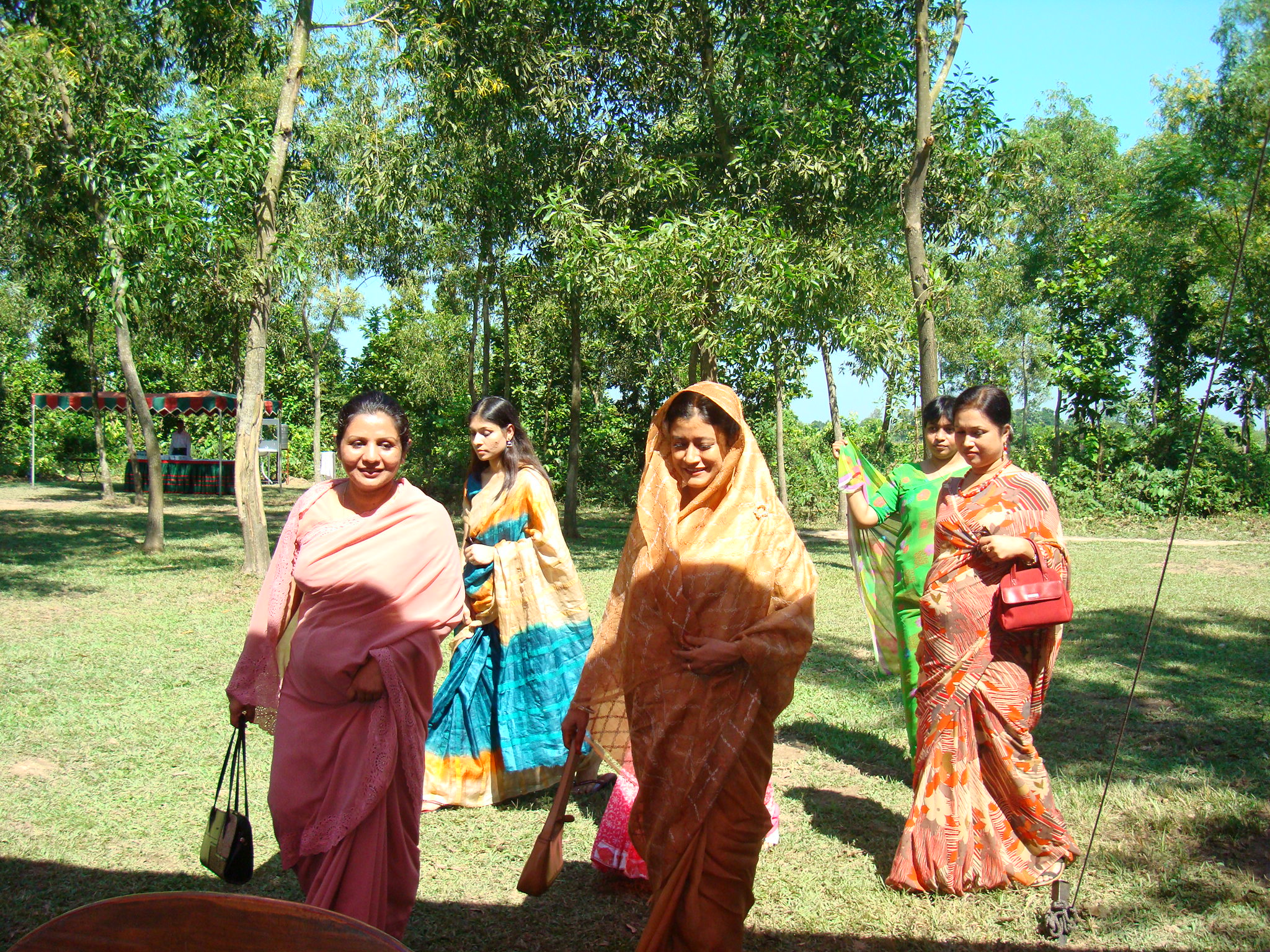

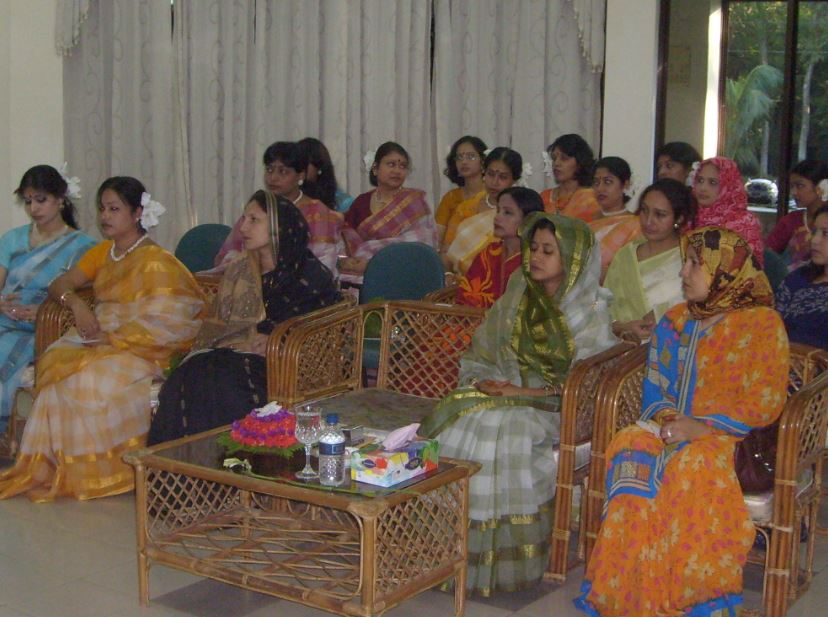

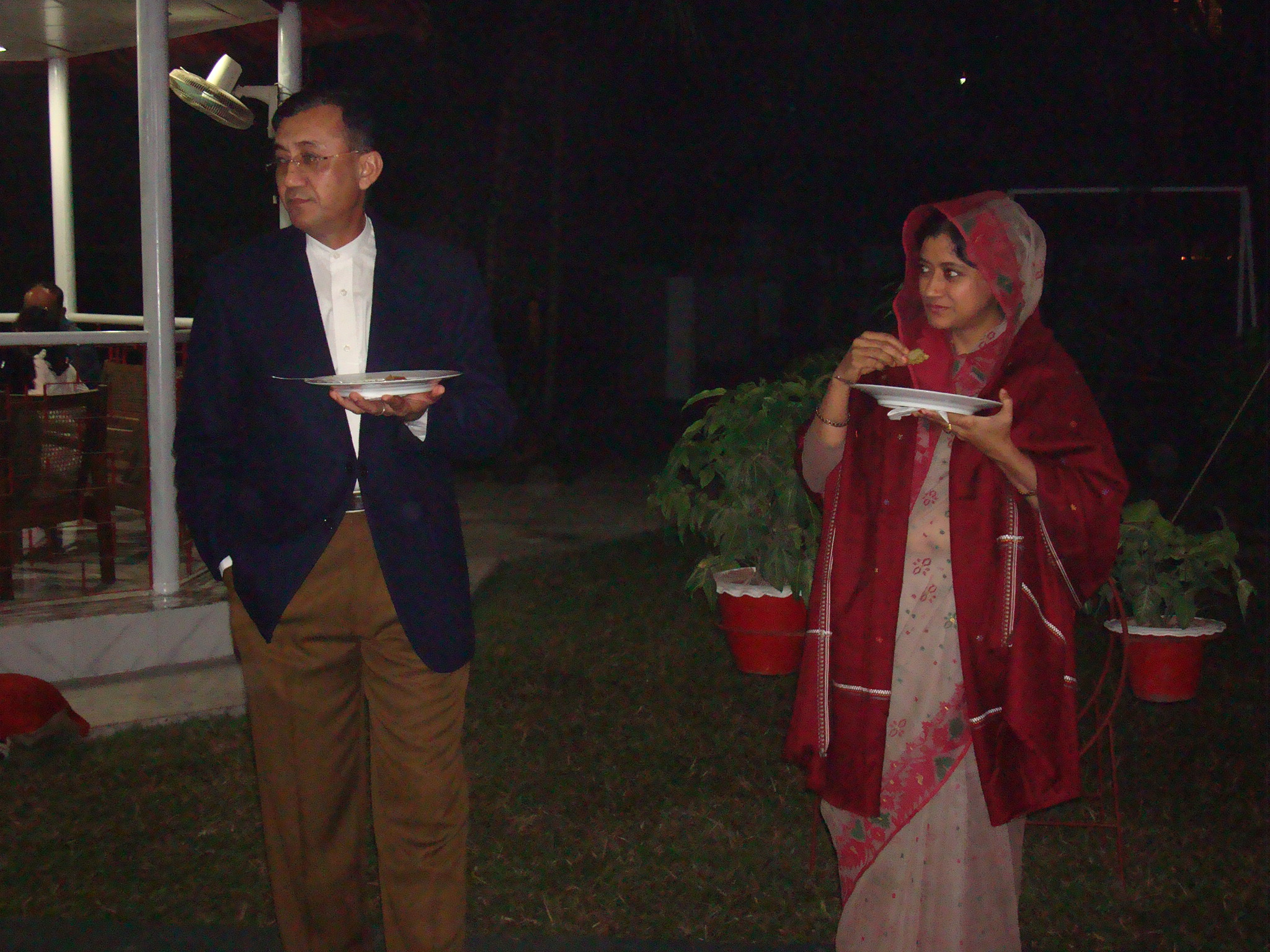

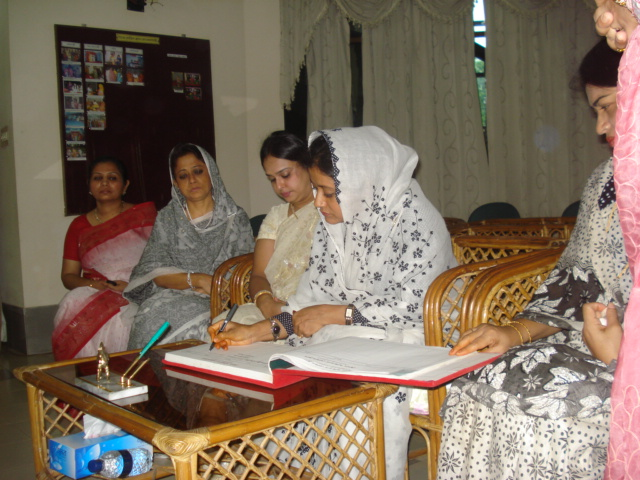
