= 403 Battle Group (Bangladesh) =

Bangladeshi military unit

403rd Battle Group
- Active: 25 July 2007 - present
- Country: Bangladesh
- Branch: Bangladesh Army
- Type: Mixed Arms
- Size: Battle Group
- Part of: ARTDOC
- Garrison/HQ: Momenshahi Cantonment

403 Battle Group is a specialized military formation of Bangladesh Army which is established to test and validate existing and new doctrines related to training and military operations. It is part of the Army Training and Doctrine Command.

== Overview ==
On 25 July 2007, the flag-raising ceremony of the newly established 403 Battle Group and five units under its command was held at Mymensingh Cantonment in Mymensingh. ARTDOC undertakes various types of research and development related projects which are later validated through 403 Battle Group.

== Mission ==
The official mission statement for 403 Battle Group states:

Provide ground testing facilities to ARTDOC for formulating the doctrine of Bangladesh Army.

== Components ==
Major General Anwar Hussain inaugurated five units under its command. Initially consisted of one infantry battalion, one independent armoured squadron, one independent Field Artillery Battery, one independent field Engineer Company and one independent division support company.

- 27th Bangladesh Infantry Regiment
- 15 Independent Armored Squadron (Posted to 24th Infantry Division)
- 34th Independent Field Artillery Battery
- 45th Independent Field Engineers Company
- 99th Independent Division Support Company

However, currently the Armoured squadron is not present in the Battle Group.
