= Hemu's Samadhi Sthal =

Sepulcher of Hemu Bhargava

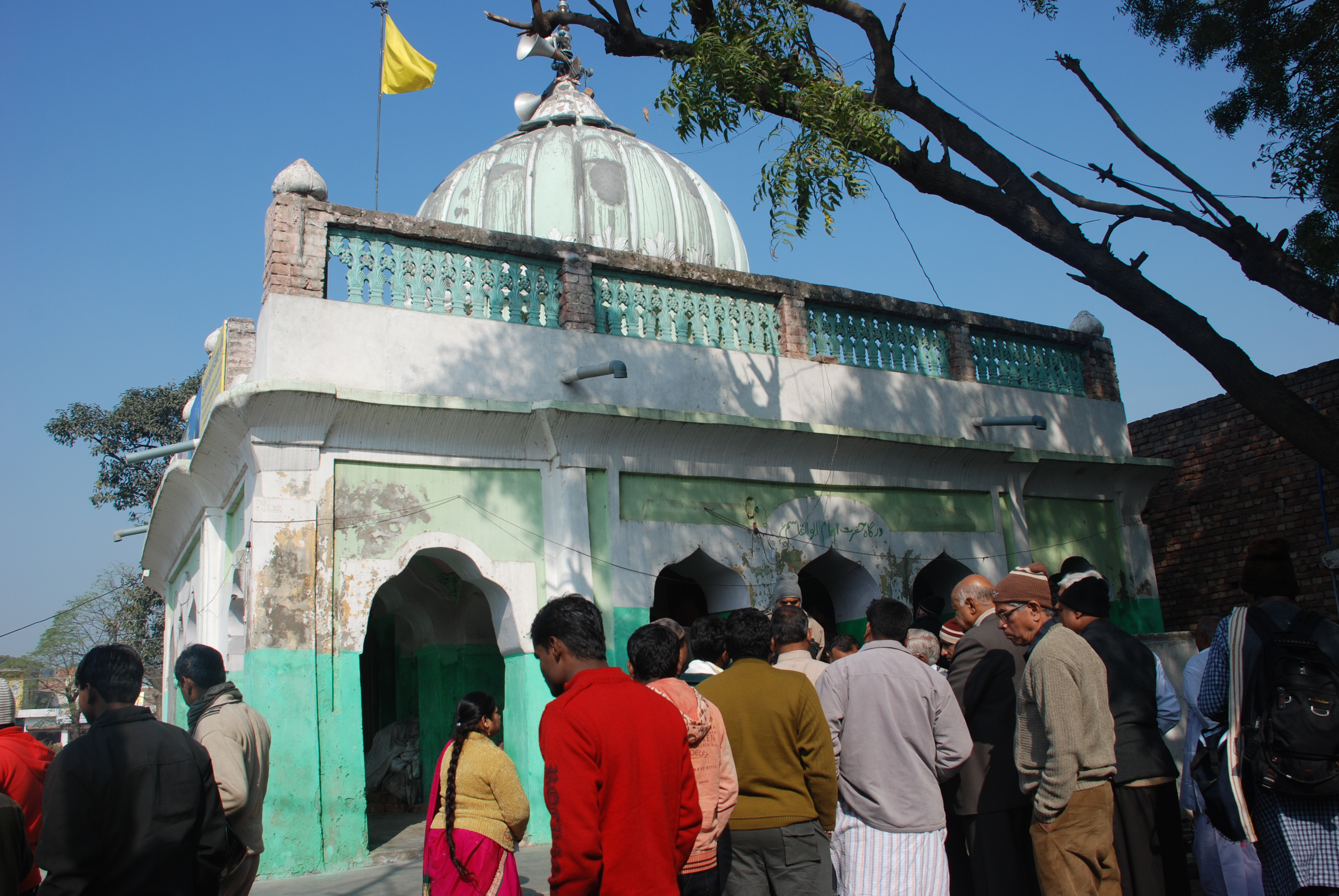

- Location within Haryana Location within India

General information
- Type: Memorial
- Coordinates: 29.39°N 76.97°E

Height
- Architectural: Hindu architecture

Hemu's Smadhi Sthal, is a memorial to the Hindu emperor Hemu at Shodapur village on Jind road near Panipat city in Panipat district of Haryana state in India. It stands at the location where he was executed.

== Encroachment ==
As the structure was lying unattended and in a state of neglect by Haryana Govt., it has been used by the migrant Muslims who have turned it into a Durgah. This property, more than 10 Acres in revenue records, which formed the Camp of Babur in 1526 during First Battle of Panipat and Camp of Akbar in 1556 during Second Battle of Panipat was with Haryana ASI till 1990. Area still has a Water Tank constructed with Lakhori Bricks in dilapidated condition built during stay of Babur. The Chief Minister, Mr. OPChautala of Haryana, in 1990 released the entire area to 'Wakf Board of Haryana' whose Chairman, a Muslim MLA from Mewat area of Haryana allowed encroachments charging money from some people and allowed Pucca constructions.

The Samadhi Sthal was constructed by Hemu's supporters during Akbar's rule on the spot where the dead Hem Chandra Vikramaditya was beheaded by Bairam Khan to get a title of Ghazi for Akbar. Presently a nearby small Mosque and Samadhi Sthal are with Muslim community and rest of all place is illegally encroached with the patronage of Wakf Board. The structure in revenue records is classified as 'Khanghah' in Persian, meaning a 'Serai' or a resting place for travellers. Such Serai's were often constructed by rich in memory of dead specially in Rewari area of Haryana where Hem Chandra belonged.

== Architecture ==
It is built in Hindu architecture. Several such structures, called 'Chattries' or 'Resting Places' for travellers are found in Rewari area with similar architecture and constructed during last many centuries.

== History ==
Hemu was a Brahmin by caste of Alwar (Machari Village Far from 7 km To Rajgarh tehsil, "Matsya Utsav" Of Alwar District Started From Machari Village Due to Some Political and Social activities) Rajasthan of Bhargav Gotra.

Hemu's rise from his humble beginnings in Rewari to the assumption of the royal title of Raja Vikramaditya is considered a notable turning point in history. But for the stray arrow in a battle where he was in a position of strength, Hemu Vikramaditya could well have brought about a restoration of a "Brahminical Monarchical Tradition" to a region which had been subject to Muslim rule for centuries. Hemu's army of 50,000 cavalry was made up of Afghans, Rajputs and Brahmins.

Colonel H.C. Kar comments: "He assumed the title of Vikramaditya. He emerged as a monarch in his own right and the only Hindu to occupy the throne of Delhi during the medieval history of India. Himself a staunch Hindu, he had no disrespect for any religion, Islam or Christianity". Kar also notes that Hemu's rule was on the pattern of the Vijayanagara Empire, a strong Hindu state prevailing in South India for more than three centuries.

John Clark Marshman wrote in 1873:

Hemu was one of the greatest commanders of the age. He was one and all combined in his personality. As a general of sterling qualities, he displayed great valour in the battlefield and embarked upon wonderful planning and strategies to win twenty two battles he waged against the enemies of the state and won all. As an energetic soldier, he never shrank away from the battlefield and when the fight was most fierce, he did not bother for his personal safety and always fought with his adversaries courageously along with his comrades. This earned him goodwill, affection and praise of his entire heterogeneous army consisting of Afghans, Rajputs and various other tribes. He was an outstanding commander and his orders were obeyed by all his troops without grudge and demur.

Daniel Coetzee, Lee W. Eysturlid wrote that :

"Hemu (full name Hem Chandra), who was a Brahmin fighting for Afghan lords, and whose life provides a glimpse into war making in 16th-century India. Hemu's family was engaged in the trade of saltpeter, one of the chief components of gunpowder, which explains Hemu's familiarity with firearms."

The Second Battle of Panipat was fought on 5 November 1556 between the forces of Akbar and Hemu, a Hindu king of Delhi. Hemu had a large army, and initially his forces were winning, but suddenly Hemu was struck by an arrow in the eye and he lost his senses. On not seeing him in his howdah on the back of an elephant, his army fled. The wounded Hemu was captured by Shah Quli Khan Second Battle of Panipat and carried to the Mughal camp at Shodapur on Jind Road at Panipat. In this Second Battle of Panipat Hemu's nephew Ramaya, a Brahmin commanded the left wing.

According to Badayuni, Bairam Khan asked Akbar to behead Hemu so that he could earn the title of Ghazi. Akbar replied 'He is already dead, if he had any strength for a duel, I would have killed him'. After Akbar's refusal Hemu's body was denied honour by the Mughal battle tradition and was unceremoniously beheaded by Bairam Khan.

== Gallery ==
- Hemu's smadhi encroached by Muslims, turned into a durgah and painted green
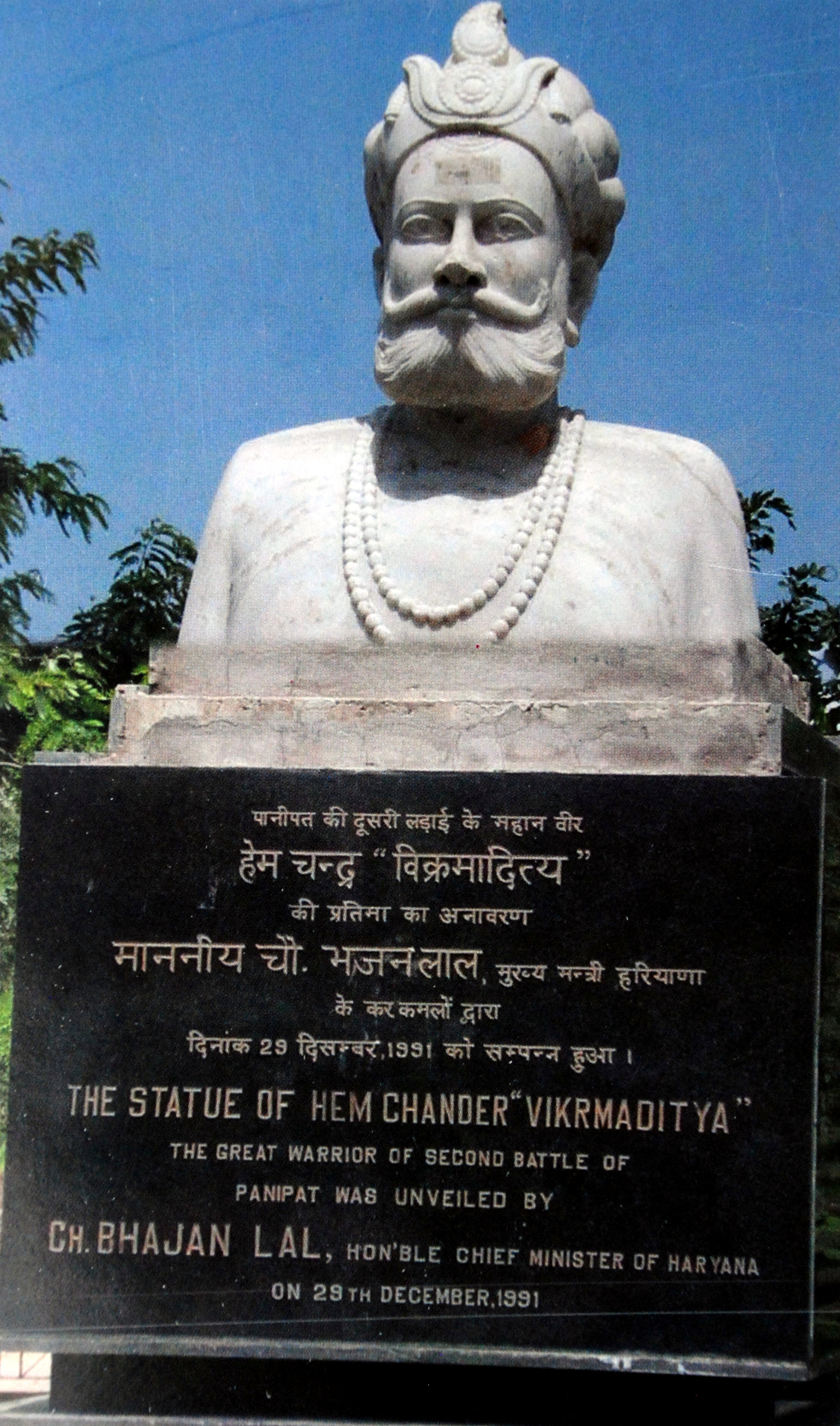
Statue of Hemu (Hem Chandra Vikramaditya) at Panipat

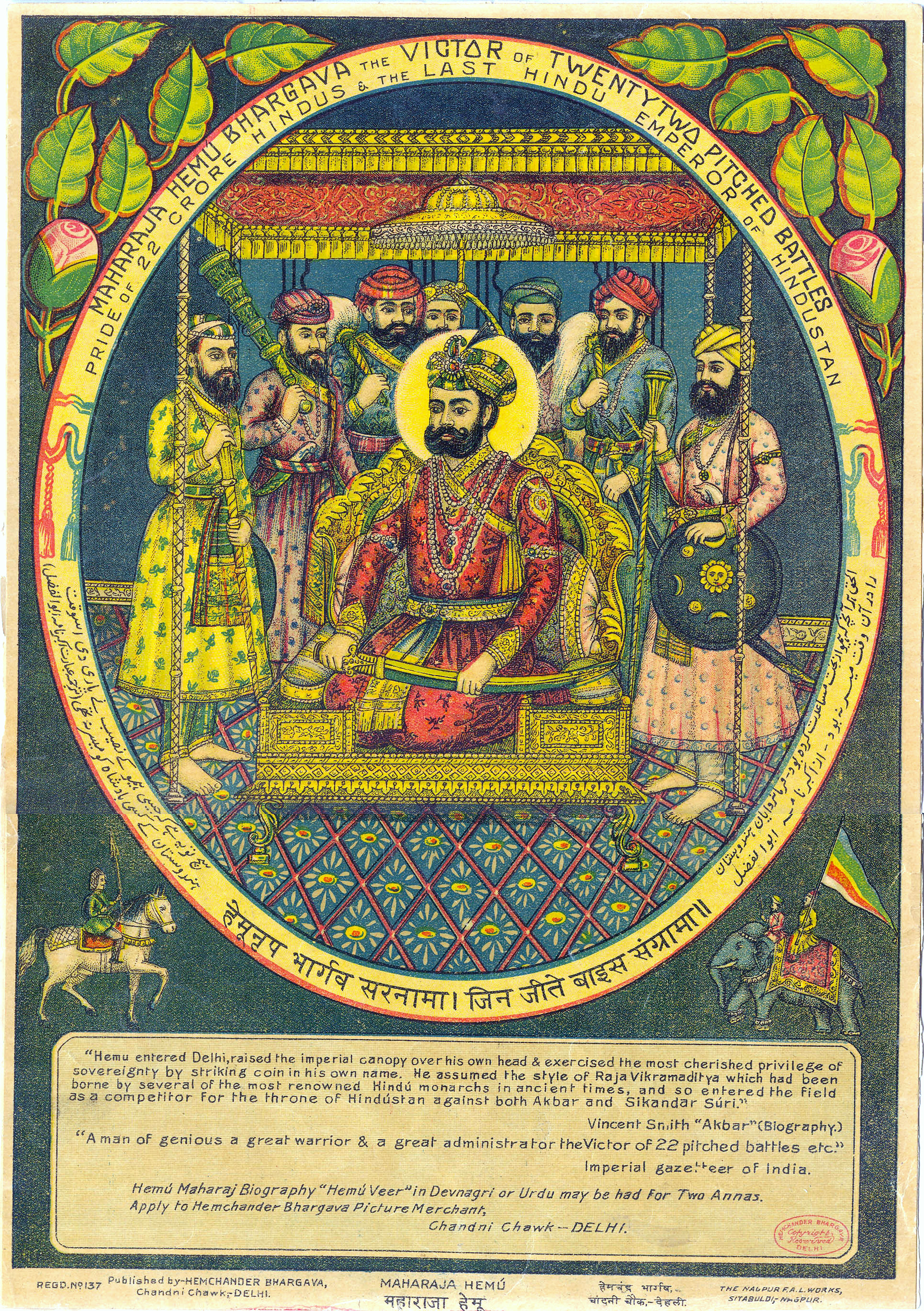
Samrat Hemu Bhargava - Victor of Twenty Two Pitched Battles

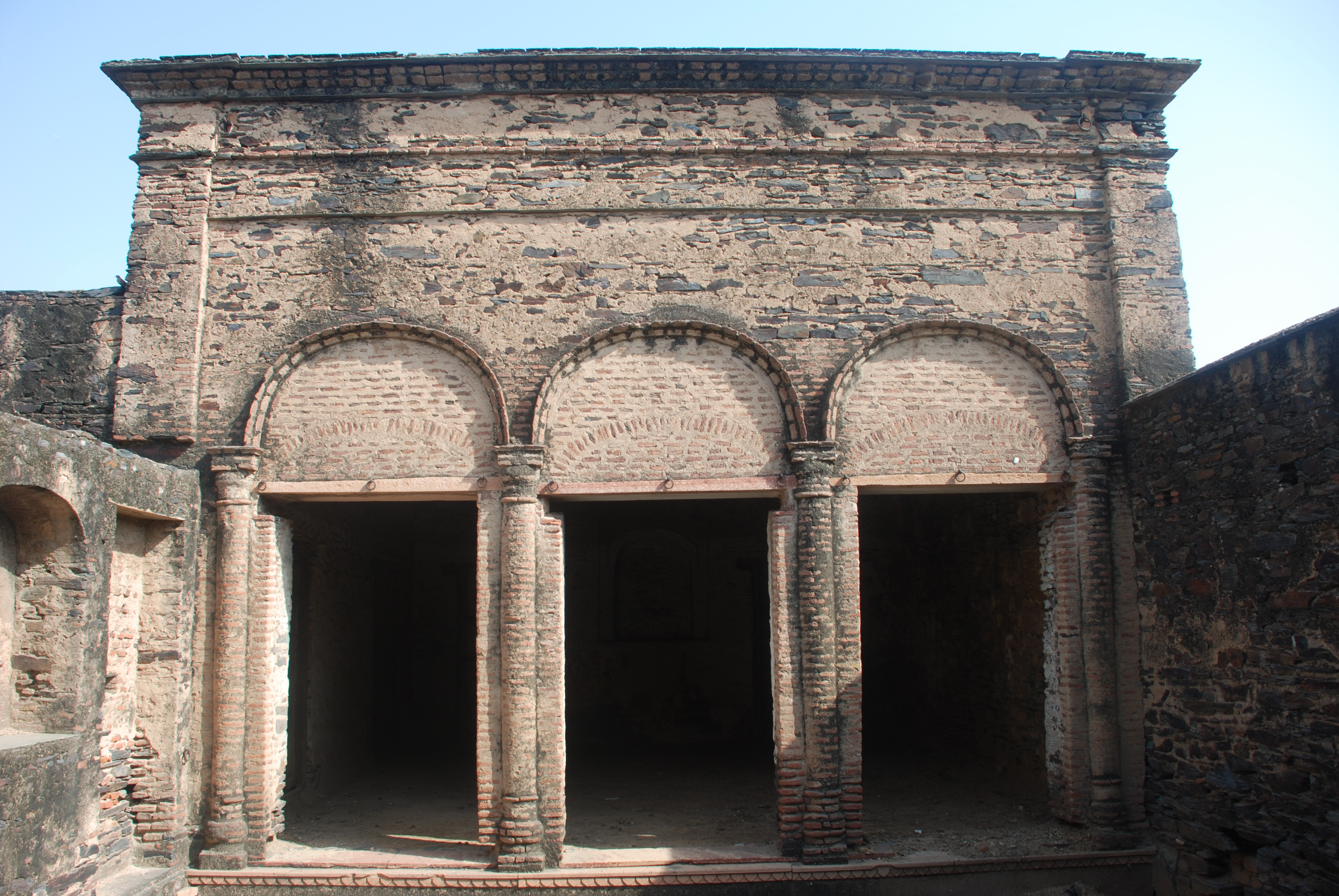
Portuguese colonial architecture in Hemu's Haveli in Rewari, which was renovated in 1540, when Hemu became 'Market Superintendent' in Delhi.

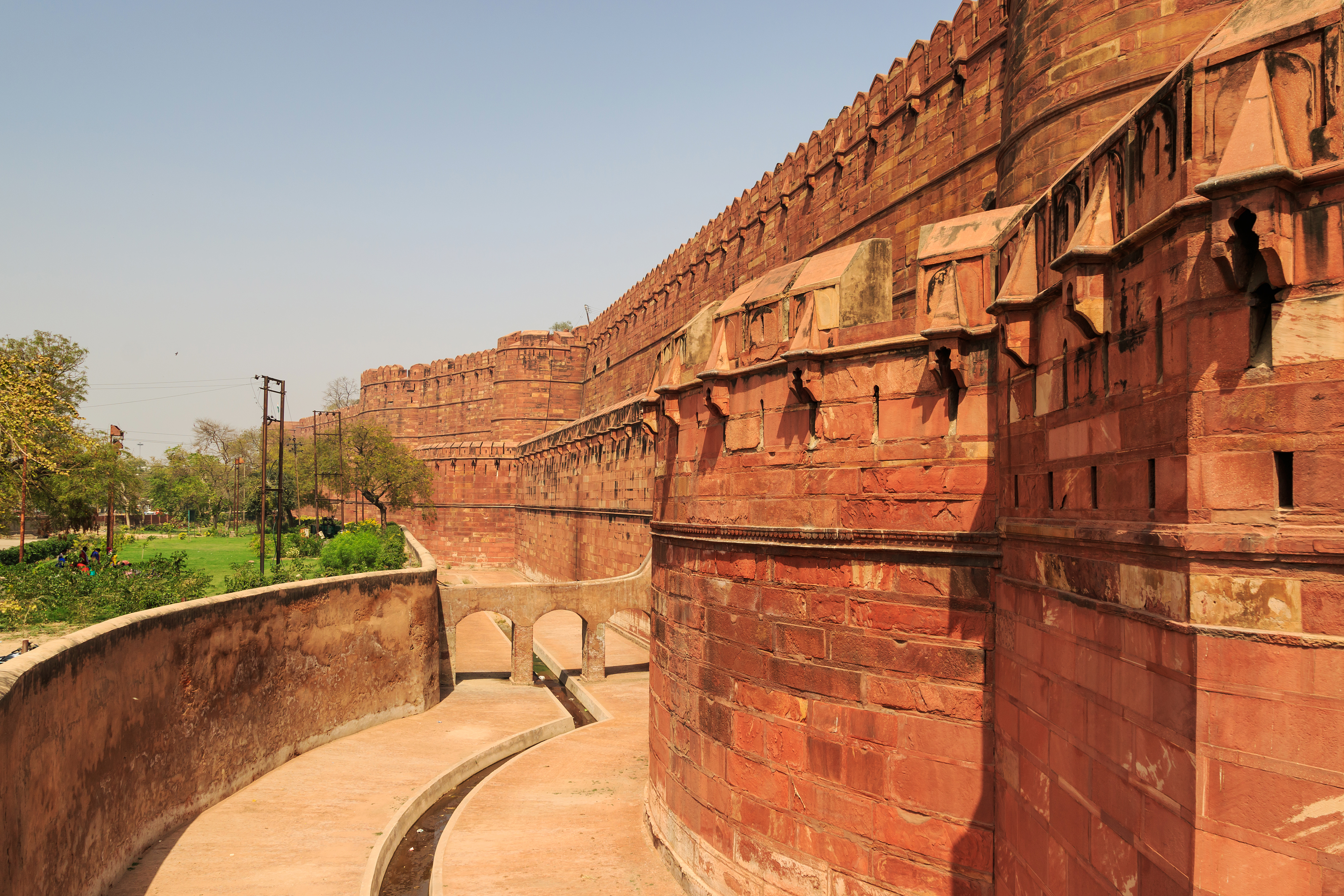
Agra Fort, won by Hemu in 1553, recaptured from Humayun in 1556, before capturing Delhi.

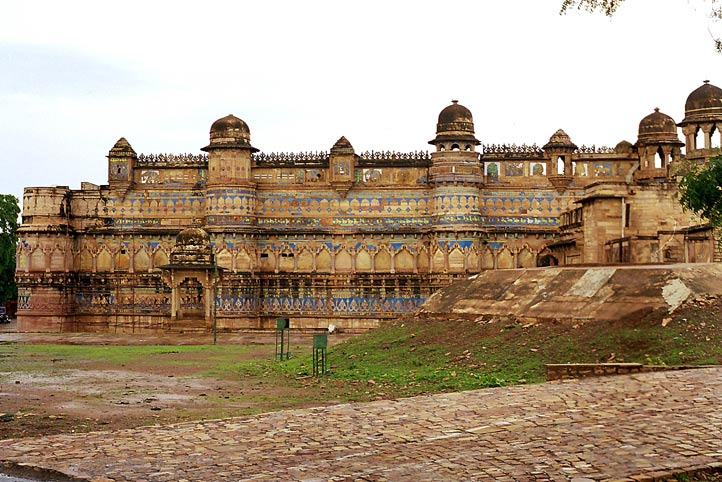
Gwalior Fort, from where Hemu launched most of the attacks during 1553-56, for his 22 battle victories.

== See also ==
- Samrat Hemu's haveli in Rewari
- Kabuli Bagh Mosque
- Ibrahim Lodhi's Tomb
- Panipat Places Of Interest
