= Shodapur =

Village in Haryana, India

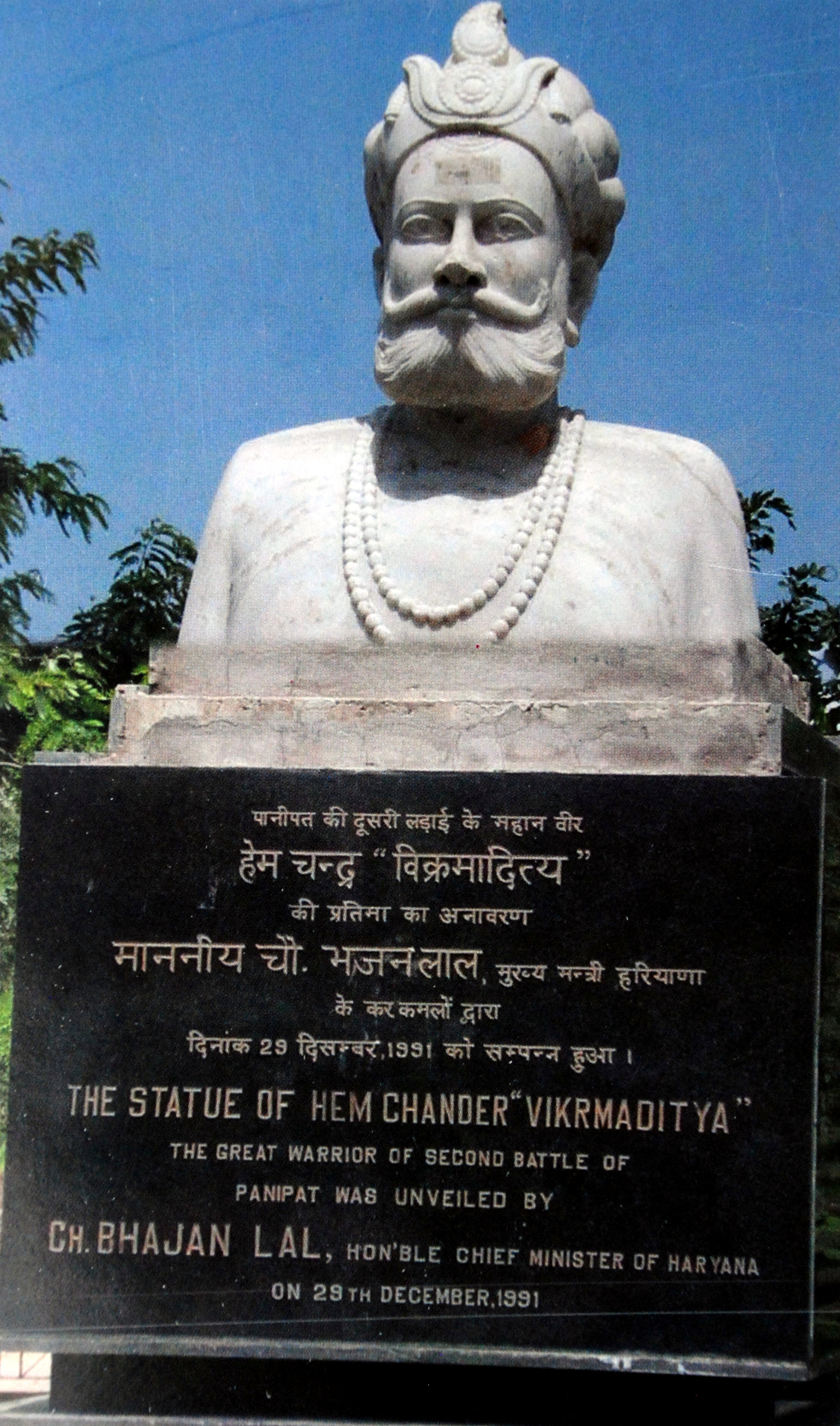

- Location within Haryana Location within India

General information
- Coordinates: 29.39°N 76.97°E

Shodapur is a village in Panipat district of the Haryana state in India. The Second Battle of Panipat was fought on 5 November 1556 between the forces of Akbar and Hemu, a Hindu king of Delhi. In the battle, a wounded Hemu was captured by Shah Quli Khan and carried to the Mughal camp at Shodapur on Jind Road at Panipat where he was beheaded.

After a few years, Hemu's supporters constructed a Samadhi (Hindu shrine) over the place where he was beheaded. This is the only memorial of Hemu in Panipat. Plans to repair the shrine began in 2019.

== Gallery ==
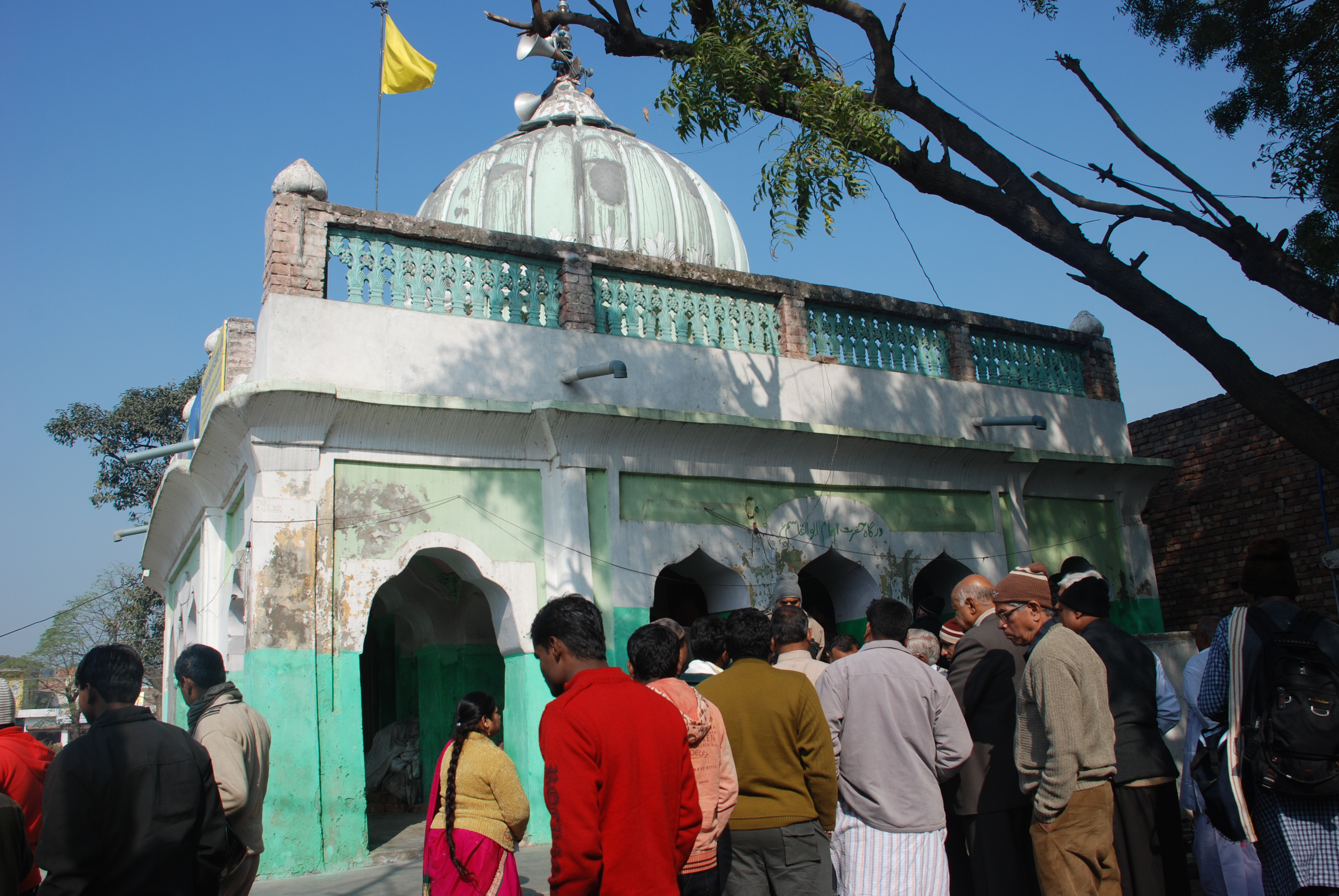
Hemu's Samadhi Sthal place beheading of Raja Hemu at village Shodapur

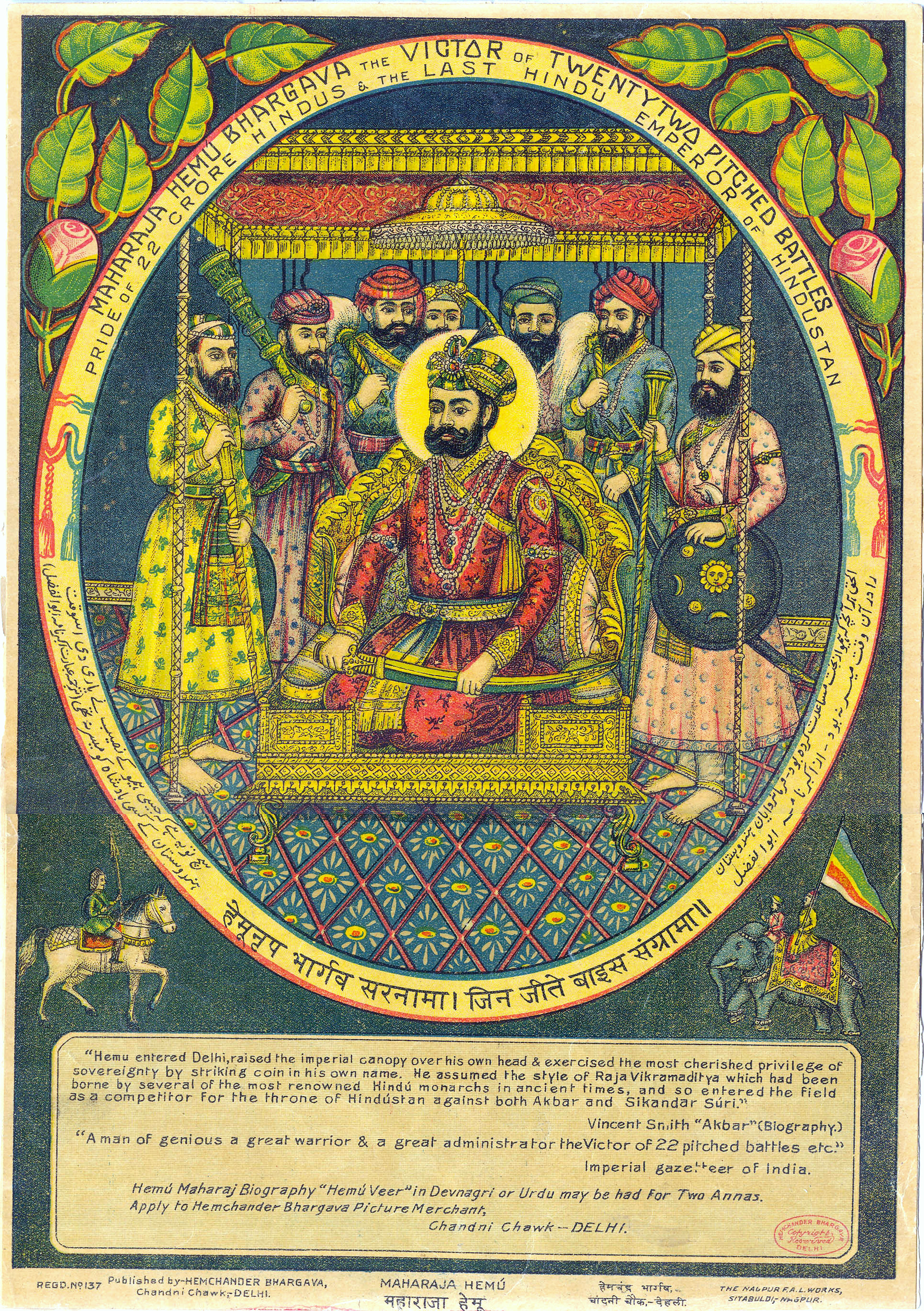
Smarat Hemu Bhargava - Victor of Twenty Two Pitched Battles

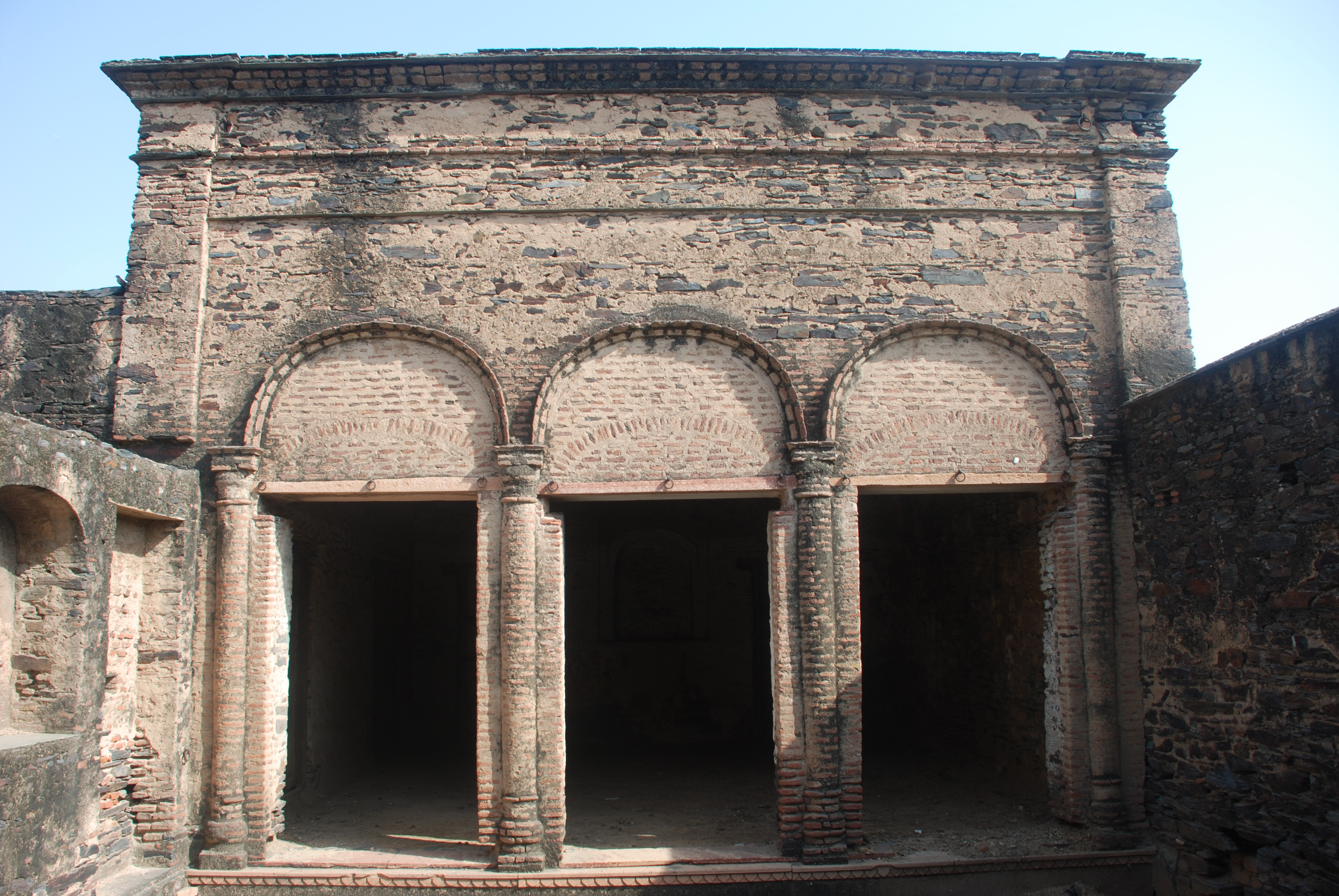
Portuguese colonial architecture in Hemu's Haveli in Rewari, which was renovated in 1540, when Hemu became 'Market Superintendent' in Delhi.

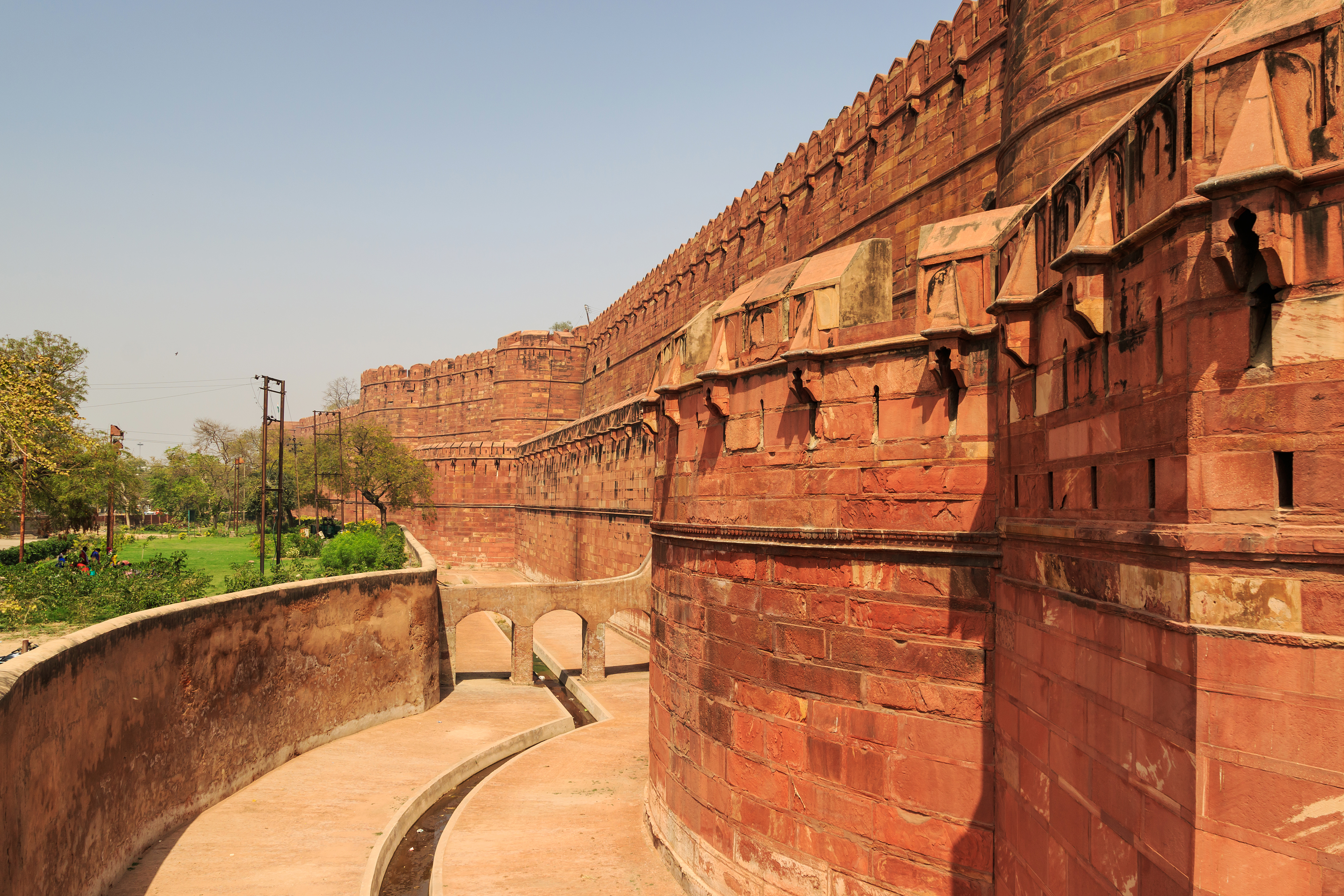
Agra Fort, won by Hemu in 1553, recaptured from Humayun in 1556, before capturing Delhi.

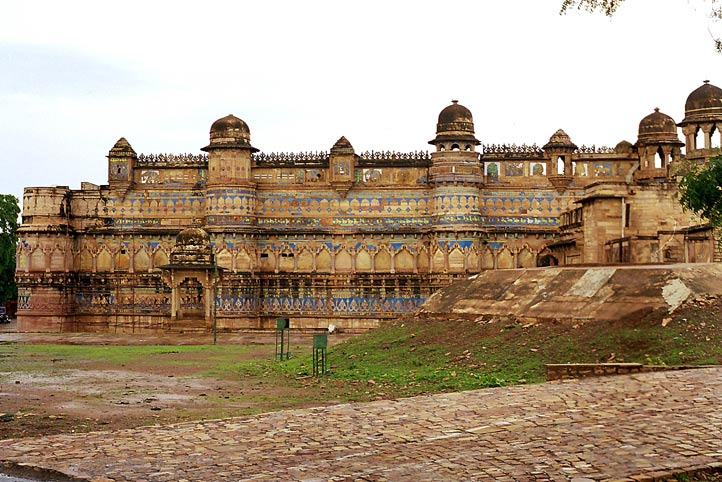
Gwalior Fort, from where Hemu launched most of the attacks during 1553–56, for his 22 battle victories.

== See also ==
- Kabuli Bagh Mosque
- Ibrahim Lodhi's Tomb
- Panipat Places of Interest
