= Fazilat =

Fazilat can refer to:

- Fazilat, a station on Line 1 of the Shiraz Metro in Shiraz, Iran
- Fazilat Party, political party in Azerbaijan
- Qazi Fazilat, Sur Empire official
