= Virtue Party (disambiguation) =

Virtue Party was a political party in Turkey.

Virtue Party may also refer to:

- El Vadila, a political party in Mauritania
- Islamic Virtue Party, a political party in Iraq
- Virtue Party (Azerbaijan), a political party in Azerbaijan
- Virtue Party (Egypt), a political party in Egypt
