= Hemu =

General, Wazir and King (1501-1556)

- Wazir; Maharaja Vikramaditya; Bhargava
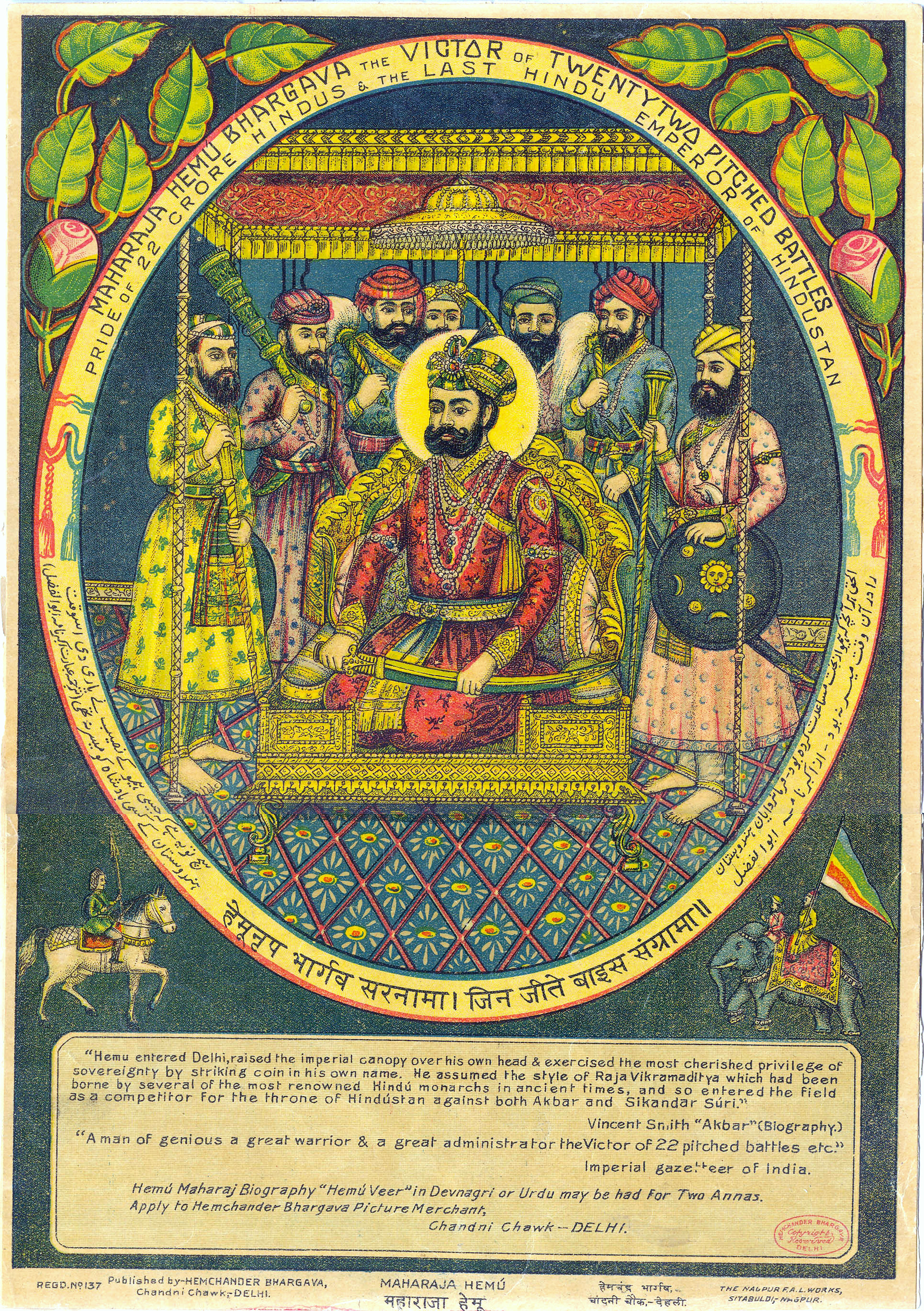
- c. 1910s portrayal of Hemu Vikramaditya

Maharaja of Delhi
- Reign: 7 October – 5 November 1556
- Coronation: 7 October 1556
- Predecessor: Adil Shah Suri (as Sultan of Sur Empire)
- Successor: Akbar (as Mughal Emperor)
- Born: Hemchandra; 1501; Machari, Rajgarh, Alwar, Mewat (present-day Rajasthan, India)
- Died: 5 November 1556 (aged 54–55); Panipat, Mughal Empire (present-day Haryana, India)
Regnal name
- Maharaja Vikramaditya
- Father: Rai Puran Bhargav
- Religion: Hinduism
- Occupation: Wazir

Hemu (/ˈheɪˌmuː/; 1501 – 5 November 1556), also known as Hemu Vikramaditya and Hemchandra Vikramaditya, was an Indian king (maharaja) who previously served as a general and Wazir of Adil Shah Suri of the Sur Empire during a period in Indian history when the Mughals and Afghans were vying for power across North India. He fought Afghan rebels across North India from Punjab to Bengal and Mughal forces of Humayun and Akbar in Agra and Delhi, winning 22 battles for Adil Shah Suri.

Hemu claimed royal status after defeating Akbar's Mughal forces on 7 October 1556 in the Battle of Delhi and assumed the title of Vikramaditya that many Indian kings had adopted in the past. A month later, Hemu was wounded by a chance arrow and captured unconscious during the Second Battle of Panipat and was subsequently beheaded by Akbar, who took the title of Ghazi.

== Early life ==
Contemporary accounts of Hemu's early life are incomplete due to his humble background and often biased because they were written by Mughal historians such as Bada'uni and Abu'l-Fazl who served in the court of Akbar. Modern historians differ on his family's ancestral home and the place and year of his birth. What is generally accepted is that he was born into a Hindu family of limited means and spent his childhood in the town of Rewari southwest of Delhi. Modern research confirms that Hemu was born to Rai Puran Bhargav, a Gaur Brahmin of Rajasthan who became Puran Das after acquiring sainthood at the Macheri village of Alwar district in Rajasthan. Due to his family's financial condition, Hemu, at a young age, started working as a tradesman of saltpetre.

== Rise to prominence ==
Details of Hemu's early career are vague and involve much speculation. Following his start as a seller of saltpetre, he is said to have been a trader or a weighman in the market. After Sher Shah Suri died in 1545, his son Islam Shah became the ruler of the Sur Empire. During his rule, Hemu became the superintendent of the market in Delhi with some military experience under his belt. Hemu is subsequently said to have been appointed the Chief of Intelligence and Superintendent of Posts. Other sources also place him as a surveyor of the imperial kitchens.

Islam Shah, who liked to place Hindus in command alongside Afghan officers so that they could spy on each other, recognised Hemu's soldierly qualities and assigned him responsibilities equivalent to those of a high-ranking officer. Hemu was then dispatched to monitor the movements of Humayun's half-brother, Kamran Mirza, in the neighbourhood of Mankot.

Islam Shah died on 30 October 1553 and was succeeded by his 12-year-old son, Firoz Shah, who was killed within three days of his accession by his uncle, Adil Shah Suri. The new ruler was, however, more interested in the pursuit of pleasure than the affairs of the state. But Hemu threw in his lot with Adil Shah, and his military successes led him to be elevated to the position of Chief Minister and the general supervisor of the state. According to Abu'l-Fazl, Hemu "undertook all appointments and dismissals, and the distribution of justice" in Adil Shah's court.

== Military career ==
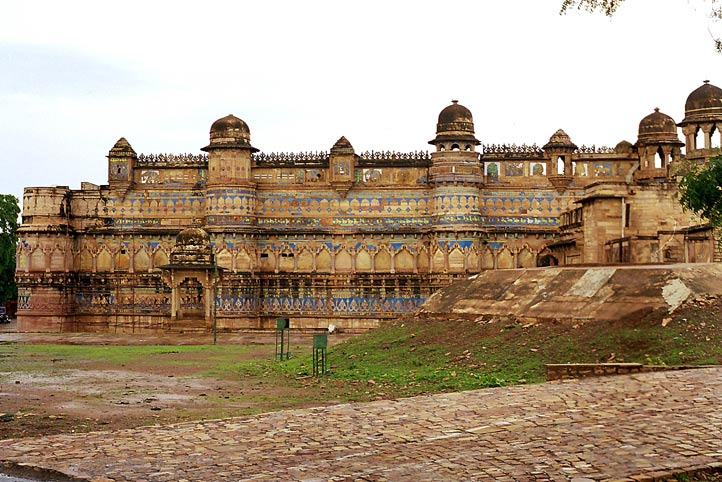
Gwalior Fort, the base for many of Hemu's campaigns.

Hemu, besides being a competent civil administrator, was also the finest military mind on the Afghan side after the demise of Sher Shah Suri. He is reputed to have waged and won as many as 22 battles against the opponents of Adil Shah. Many of these battles were against Afghans who had rebelled against Adil Shah. One of these was Taj Khan Karrani, a member of Islam Shah's court who, rather than serving Adil Shah, decided to flee with his followers from Gwalior towards the east. He was overtaken by Hemu at Chibramau and defeated, but somehow managed to escape and plundered his way to Chunar. Hemu gave chase again, fought Karrani at Chunar, and was again victorious. However, just as at Chibramau, Karrani gave him the slip again. Hemu asked Adil Shah—who had accompanied him—to remain at Chunar and proceeded to chase Karrani to Bengal.

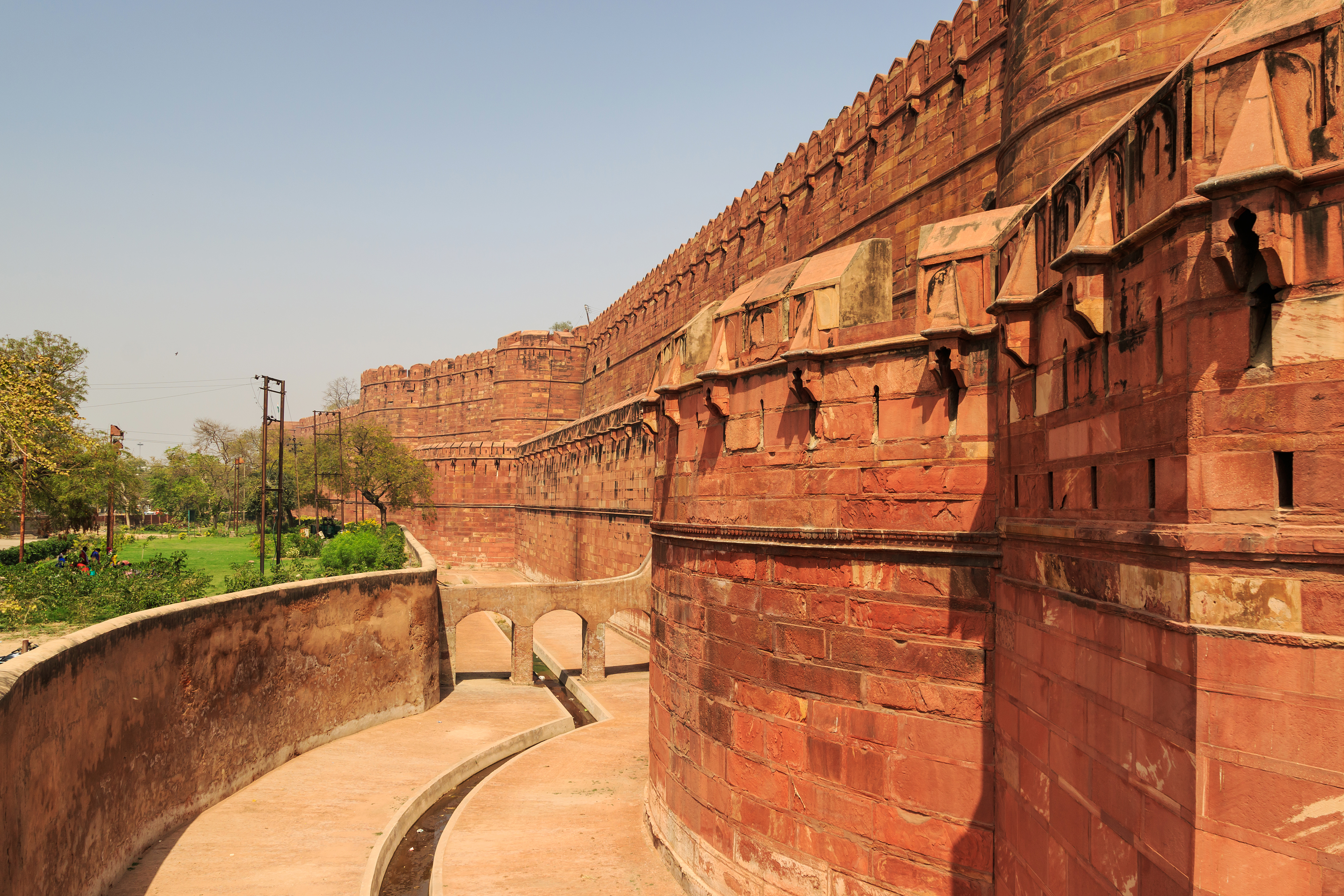
Agra Fort, captured by Hemu before the Battle of Tughlaqabad.

After the victory of Humayun over Adil Shah's brother-in-law, Sikandar Shah Suri, on 23 July 1555, the Mughals finally recovered Delhi and Agra. Hemu was in Bengal when Humayun died on 26 January 1556. His death gave Hemu an ideal opportunity to defeat the Mughals. He rapidly marched from Bengal and drove the Mughals out of Bayana, Etawah, Sambhal, Kalpi, and Narnaul. In Agra, the governor evacuated the city and fled without a fight upon hearing of Hemu's invasion.

In 1556, Hemu defeated and killed Muhammad Khan Sur who had declared himself independent in 1553 at the Battle of Chappar Ghat.

Hemu's most notable victory occurred shortly thereafter against the Mughals at Tughlaqabad.

=== Battle of Tughlaqabad ===
Tardi Beg Khan, who was Akbar's governor in Delhi, wrote to his masters who were camped at Jalandhar, that Hemu had captured Agra and intended to attack the capital Delhi, which could not be defended without reinforcements. While the main army could not be spared due to the belligerent presence of Sikandar Shah Suri, Akbar's regent, Bairam Khan, realising the gravity of the situation, sent his most capable lieutenant, Pir Muhammad Sharwani, to Delhi. Meanwhile, Tardi Beg Khan had also ordered all the nearby Mughal nobles to muster their forces at Delhi. A council of war was convened, and it was decided that the Mughals would stand and fight Hemu. Plans were made accordingly.

After winning Agra, Hemu, who had set off in pursuit of the city's governor, reached Tughlaqabad, a village just outside Delhi where he ran into Tardi Beg Khan's forces. The Mughals, while outnumbered, put up a gallant fight against Hemu's forces, which, according to Bada'uni, included 1000 war elephants, 50,000 cavalry, 51 cannons, and 500 falconets. Jadunath Sarkar describes the battle thus:

The Mughal army was thus drawn up: Abdullah Uzbeg commanded the Van, Haidar Muhammad the right wing, Iskandar Beg the left, and Tardi Beg himself the centre. The choice Turki cavalry in the van and left wing attacked and drove back the enemy forces before them, and followed far in pursuit. In this assault, the victors captured 400 elephants and slew 3,000 men from the Afghan army. Imagining victory already gained, many of Tardi Beg's followers dispersed to plunder the enemy camp, and he was left in the field very thinly guarded. All this time Hemu had been holding 300 choice elephants and a force of select horsemen as a reserve in the centre. He promptly seized the opportunity and made a sudden charge upon Tardi Beg with this reserve. At the impetuous advance of the huge beasts and the dense cavalry behind them, many of the Mughal officers fled away in terror without waiting to offer a defence. At last Tardi Beg himself took the same course.

Hemu's push was also bolstered by the timely arrival of fresh reinforcements from Alwar under the command of Haji Khan. When the previously victorious Mughal vanguard and left wing returned from their pursuit, they realised the day was lost and dispersed without offering a fight. Hemu took possession of Delhi after a day's battle on 7 October 1556.

=== As Raja Vikramaditya ===
After taking control of Delhi, Hemu claimed royal status. He assumed the title of Vikramaditya (or Bikramjit), an appellation used by several Hindu kings in India's ancient past. What this signifies is, however, a subject of speculation among historians.

Historians such as Satish Chandra do not believe that this implies that Hemu had declared himself an independent king. He reasons that, for one, none of the Mughal authors of the time explicitly say so in their histories. In the Akbarnama, Abu'l-Fazl writes that after Hemu's victory at Tughlaqabad, "the ambition of sovereignty" was stirring within him. According to Bada'uni, Hemu took on the title of Bikramjit like a great Raja of Hindustan. Another contemporary historian, Nizamuddin Ahmad, states that Hemu took on said title but refrains from saying anything more. Secondly, it would have been ill-advised as Hemu's military force was composed almost entirely of Afghans. According to Bada'uni, there were also some murmurings against Hemu amongst the Afghans who were "sick of his usurpation … prayed for his downfall".

Other historians describe Hemu's claim to be an attempt to set himself up as an independent ruler, throwing off the yoke of Adil Shah's authority. Abraham Eraly quotes Ahmad Yadgar who states in his history of the Afghans that Hemu "raised the royal canopy over him, and ordered coin to be struck in his name". This was done in connivance with the Afghans to whom he had liberally distributed the spoils. But Eraly notes that Hemu continued to humour Adil Shah with professions of fealty.

Whether he had set himself up as an independent king or not, Hemu Vikramaditya's reign would be short-lived as he would again clash with the Mughals only a month later. This time, the battlefield would be at Panipat, not far from the site where Akbar's grandfather, Babur, had been victorious against the Lodis 30 years earlier.

=== Second Battle of Panipat ===
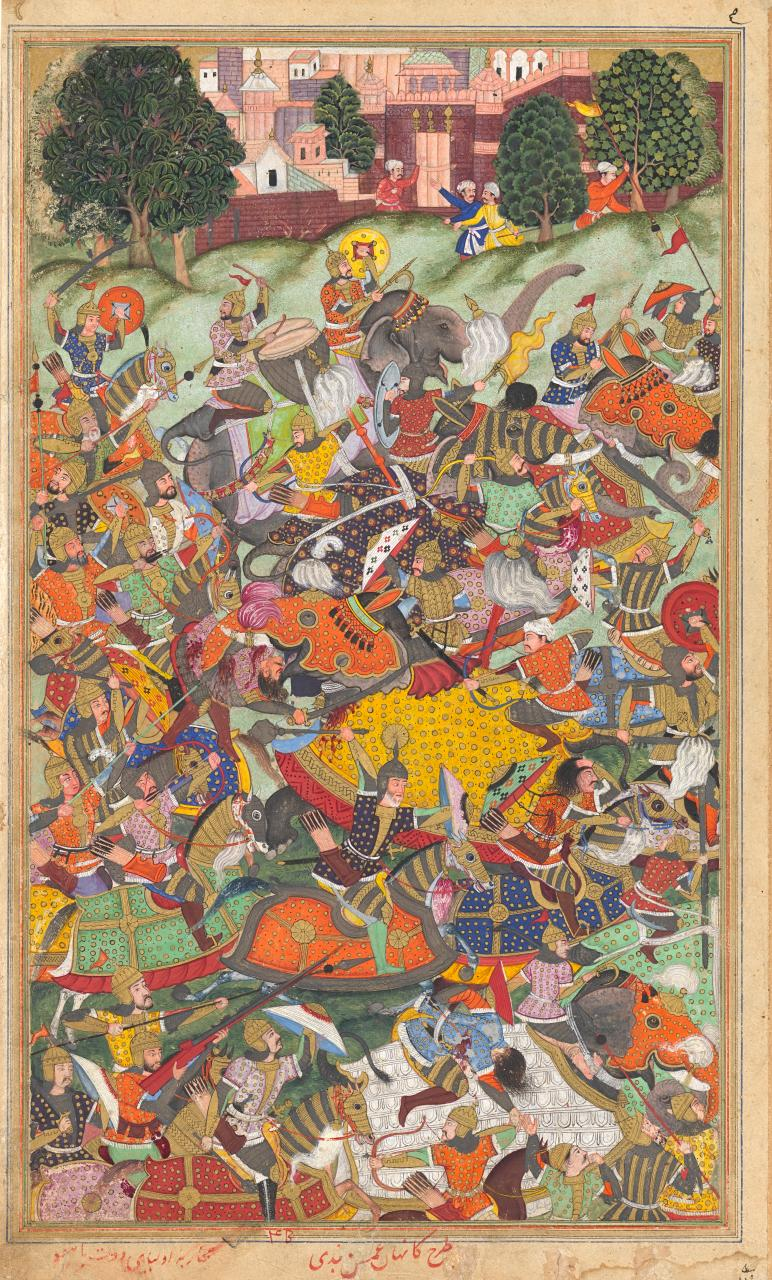
The defeat of Hemu, a c. 1590s painting by Kankar from the Akbarnama. Neither Hemu nor Akbar are depicted here, suggesting this might be part of a double-page composition.

On hearing the disastrous news from Tughlaqabad, Akbar immediately set off for Delhi. Ali Quli Khan Shaibani, sent ahead with a 10,000-strong cavalry force, chanced upon Hemu's artillery, which was being transported under a weak guard. He was quickly able to capture the entire artillery train. This would prove to be a costly loss for Hemu.

On 5 November 1556, the Mughal Army met Hemu's army at the historic battlefield of Panipat. Akbar and Bairam Khan stayed in the rear, eight miles from the battleground. The Mughal Army was led by Ali Quli Khan Shaibani in the centre with Sikandar Khan Uzbak on the right and Abdulla Khan Uzbak towards the left and the vanguard led by Husain Quli Beg and Shah Quli Mahram. Hemu led his army into battle atop an elephant named Hawai. His left was led by his sister's son, Ramya, and the right by Shadi Khan Kakkar. It was a desperately contested battle, but the advantage tilted in favour of Hemu. Both the wings of the Mughal army had been driven back, and Hemu moved his contingent of war elephants and cavalry forward to crush their centre. Hemu was on the cusp of victory when he was wounded in the eye by a Mughal arrow and collapsed unconscious. This triggered a panic in his army, which broke the formation, and he fled. The battle was lost; 5000 dead lay on the field of battle, and many more were killed while fleeing.

== Death ==
The elephant carrying the wounded Hemu was captured and led to the Mughal camp. Bairam Khan asked the 13-year-old Akbar to behead Hemu. According to Akbar's later courtier Abu'l-Fazl ibn Mubarak, he refused to take the sword to a dead man. However, this is not attested by contemporary chronicler Muhammad Arif Qandhari who composed the "Tarikh-i-Akbari", stating that Akbar followed Bairam Khan's advice and himself beheaded Hemu and took the title of Ghazi. The account of Akbar's refusal to behead Hemu is probably a later invention of his courtiers. Hemu's head was sent to Kabul while his body was gibbeted on a gate in Delhi. A minaret was subsequently constructed of the heads of the other dead.

=== Aftermath ===
Hemu's family who lived in Machari (near Alwar) was captured by Pir Muhammad, a Mughal officer who had fought at Panipat. Pir Muhammad offered to spare the life of Hemu's elderly father if he converted to Islam. When the older man refused, he was executed. However, Hemu's wife managed to escape.

With the passing of Hemu, Adil Shah's fortunes also took a turn for the worse. He was defeated and killed by Khizr Khan, son of Muhammad Khan Sur of Bengal, in April 1557.

The spoils from the battle at Panipat included 120 of Hemu's war elephants. Their destructive rampages impressed the Mughals so much that the animals soon became integral to their military strategies.

== Legacy ==
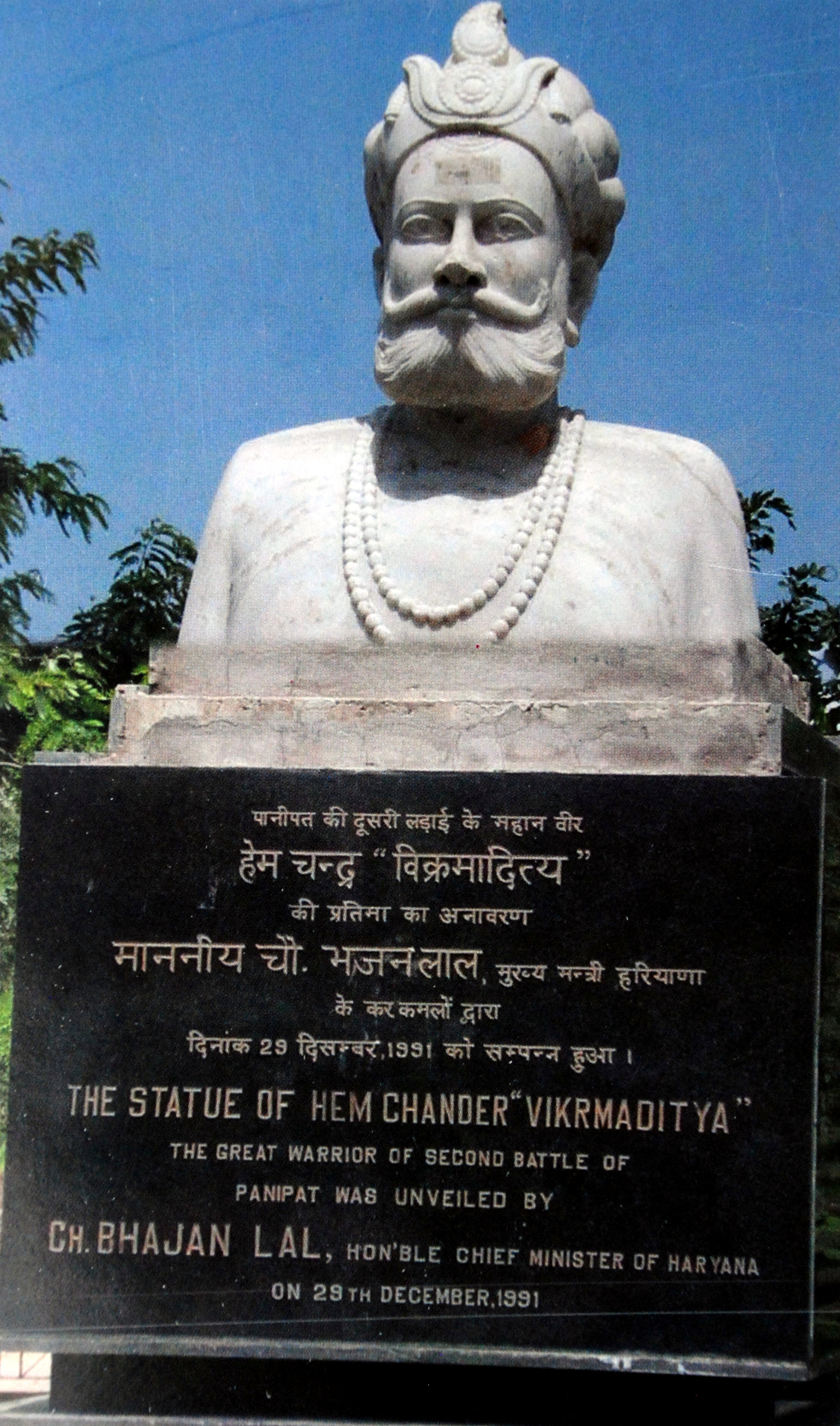
A statue of Hemu at Panipat in modern Haryana

Hemu's rise from his humble beginnings in Rewari to the assumption of the imperial title of Raja Vikramaditya is considered a notable turning point in history. But if not for the stray arrow in a battle where he was in a position of strength, Hemu Vikramaditya could have restored a "Sanskritic monarchical tradition" to a region that had been subject to Muslim rule for centuries. However, given that Hemu's army and administrative base consisted of ethnic Afghans loyal to the 'Sur Dynasty', the feasibility of him retaining the royal status is questioned. It would have been an ill-advised move as Hemu's military force was composed almost entirely of Afghans. According to Bada'uni, there were also some murmurings against Hemu amongst the Afghans who were "sick of his usurpation … prayed for his downfall".

Even Hemu's enemies grudgingly admired him. Abu'l-Fazl praises his lofty spirit, courage, and enterprise, wishing that young Akbar or perhaps a wise member of his court had deigned to keep Hemu prisoner rather than executing him in the hope that he could have been persuaded to join Imperial Mughal service where he would surely have distinguished himself.

Hemu's supporters erected a memorial for him at Panipat, now known as Hemu's Samadhi Sthal.

== See also ==
- Chunar Fort
- Third Battle of Panipat
