= Second Battle of Panipat =

1556 battle during the Mughal conquest of the Sur Empire

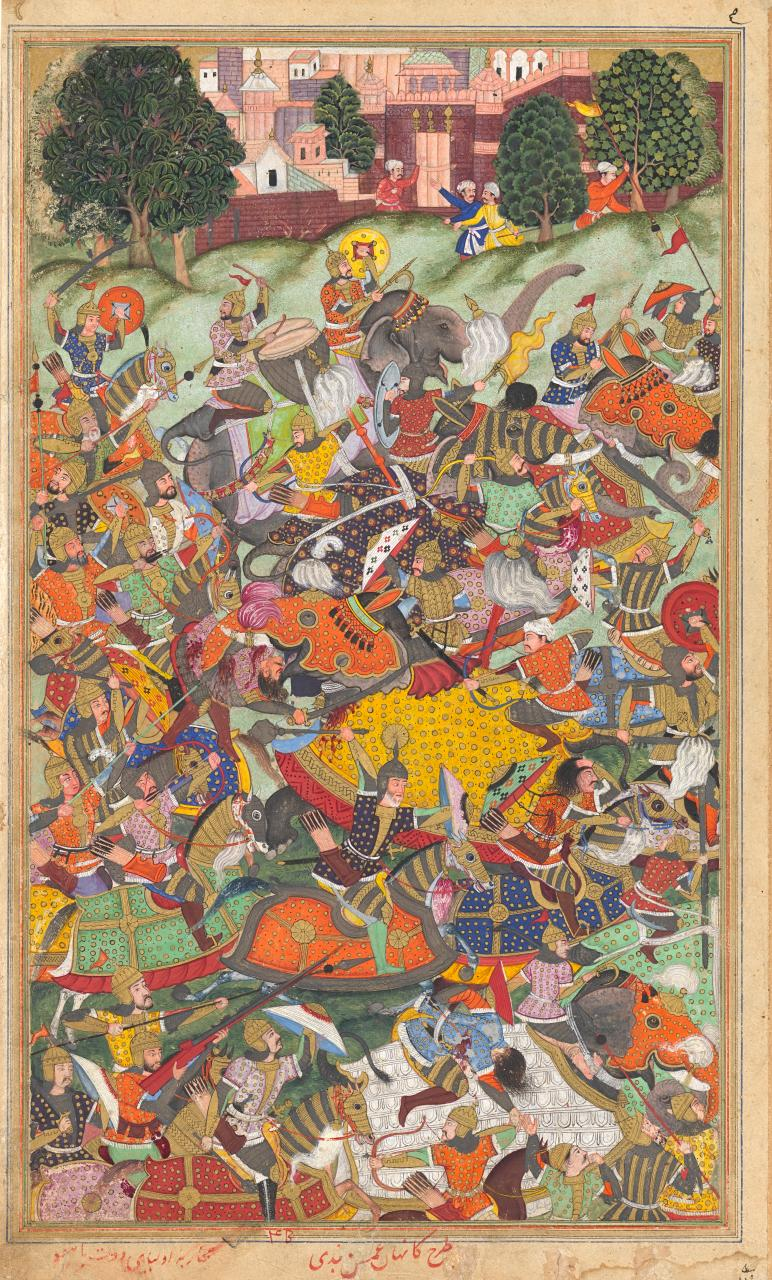
- The defeat of Hemu, Second Battle of Panipat painting by Kankar from the Akbarnama c. 1590s
Date	5 November 1556
Location	Panipat (in present-day Haryana, India) 29°23′41″N 76°55′34″E
Result	Mughal Empire victory
Territorial changes	Delhi and Agra captured by Akbar

Belligerents
Mughal Empire	Sur Empire

Commanders and leaders
Akbar; Bairam Khan; Mahmud Khan; Ali Shaibani; Sikandar Uzbak; Abdullah Uzbak; Quli Mahram	Hemchandra Vikramaditya (WIA) (executed); Raamya; Shadi Khan Kakar †

Strength
30,000 cavalry 200 war elephants	30,000 cavalry 500 war elephants

Casualties and losses
10,000	5,000
- Location within India

The Second Battle of Panipat was fought on 5 November 1556, between the Mughals under Akbar and king Hemu, titularly known as Hemchandra Vikramaditya. Hemchandra had conquered Delhi and Agra a few weeks earlier by defeating Mughal forces under Tardi Beg Khan in the Battle of Delhi. He crowned himself Vikramaditya at Purana Quila in Delhi.

On learning of the loss, Akbar and his guardian Bairam Khan marched to reclaim those territories. The two armies clashed at Panipat, not far from the site of the First Battle of Panipat of 1526.

During the battle, Hemchandra was wounded by an arrow and fell unconscious. Seeing their leader going down, his army panicked and dispersed. Unconscious and almost dead, Hemu was captured and subsequently beheaded by Akbar who assumed the title of Ghazi.

== Background ==
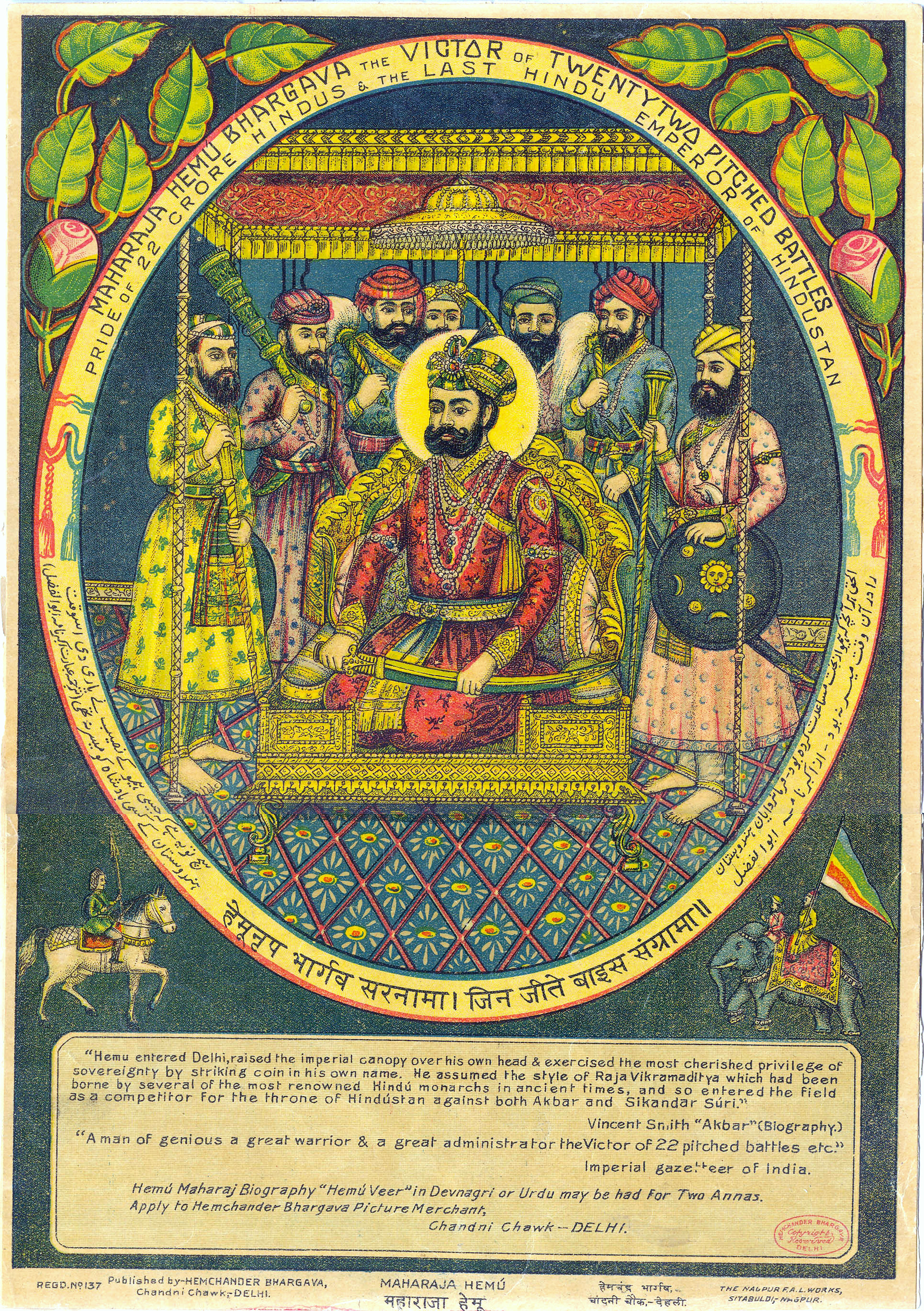
Portrayal of Hemu c. 1910s

Humayun, the successor of Babur, the founder of the Mughal Empire, had lost his inheritance when he was chased out of India by Sher Shah Suri, who established the Sur Empire in 1540. Delhi and Agra fell into Sher Shah's hands, but he died soon after in 1545 at Kalinjar. He was succeeded by his younger son, Islam Shah Suri, who was a capable ruler. However, upon his death in 1554, the Sur Empire was caught up in a succession battle and was plagued by rebellion and the secession of provinces. Humayun made use of this discord to recapture what was lost and on 23 July 1555, the Mughals defeated Sikandar Shah Suri and finally regained control over Delhi and Agra.

Islam Shah's rightful successor, his 12-year-old son, Firoz Khan, had been murdered by his maternal uncle, who had taken the throne as Adil Shah Suri. The new ruler was, however, more interested in the pursuit of pleasure than in the affairs of his state. Those were left mainly to Hemchandra, an old Hindu associate of Sher Shah Suri from Rewari, who had risen from humble circumstances to become both Adil Shah's Chief Minister as well as the general of the Suri army. He was in Bengal when Humayun died on 27 January 1556. The Mughal emperor's death provided an ideal opportunity for Hemu to defeat the Mughals and reclaim lost territory.

Hemchandra started a rapid march from Bengal and drove the Mughals out of Bayana, Etawah, Bharthana, Bidhuna, Lakhna, Sambhal, Kalpi, and Narnaul. In Agra, the governor evacuated the city and fled without a fight upon hearing of Hemchandra's impending invasion. In pursuit of the governor, Hemchandra reached Tughlaqabad, a village just outside Delhi where he ran into the forces of the Mughal governor of Delhi, Tardi Beg Khan, and defeated them in the Battle of Tughlaqabad. He took possession of Delhi after a day's battle on 7 October 1556 and claimed royal status assuming the title of Vikramaditya (or Bikramjit).

== Prelude ==
On hearing the disastrous news from Tughlaqabad, Humayun's successor, the 13-year-old Akbar and his guardian, Bairam Khan, soon set off for Delhi. In a stroke of luck, Ali Quli Khan Shaibani (later Khan-i-Zaman), who had been sent ahead with a 10,000-strong cavalry force, chanced upon Hemchandra's artillery, which was being transported under a weak guard. He could easily capture the entire train of artillery from the Afghans, who abandoned the guns and fled without making a stand. That proved to be a costly loss for Hemu.

On 5 November 1556, the Mughal army met Hemu's army at the historic battlefield of Panipat. Akbar and Bairam Khan stayed in the rear, eight miles from the battleground.

== Formation ==
The Mughal army was led by Ali Quli Khan Shaibani, with his 10,000 cavalry in the centre, Sikandar Khan Uzbak on the right, and Abdulla Khan Uzbak towards the left. The vanguard was led by Husain Quli Beg and Shah Quli Mahram and included Bairam Khan's detachment of Turks.

Hemu's army was numerically superior, counting among its ranks a 30,000-strong cavalry force consisting of Afghan horse riders and an elephant contingent numbering 500. Each war elephant was protected by plate armour and mounted by musketeers and crossbowmen. Hemchandra led his army himself into battle atop an elephant named Hawai. His left was led by his sister's son, Ramya, and the right by Shadi Khan Kakar. His army was an experienced and confident lot and Hemu had, by this time, been victorious in 22 battles from Bengal to Punjab. In this battle, however, Hemchandra had no artillery.

== Battle ==
Two armies so collided
That they struck fire out of water;
You'd say the air was all crimsoned daggers,
Their steel had all become solid rubies.

— Abu'l-Fazl, Akbarnama

Hemchandra began the attack himself and loosed his elephants among the right and left wings of the Mughals. Those soldiers who were able to escape the rampage, rather than retreating, chose to veer to the sides and attack the flanks of Hemu's cavalry, pelting them with their superior archery. The Mughal centre also advanced and took up a defensive position before a deep ravine. Neither Hemchandra's elephant nor his horse units were able to cross the chasm to reach their opponents and were vulnerable to the projectile weapons being fired from the other side. Meanwhile, the Mughal cavalry, on their swift mounts, had made inroads into the Afghan ranks from the flanks and the rear and began targeting the elephants, either slashing at the legs of the great beasts or taking out their riders. Hemchandra pulled back his elephants, and the Afghan attack relented.

Seeing the Afghan attack slackening, Ali Quli Khan led his cavalry out, circling around and falling upon the Afghan centre from the rear. Hemu, monitoring the battlefield from his howdah atop Hawai, immediately hurried to counter this charge. Even after seeing Shadi Khan Kakar and another of his able lieutenants, Bhagwan Das, go down, he continued to lead counterattacks against the Mughals, running down any who challenged his elephants. It was a desperately contested battle, but the advantage seemed to have tilted in favour of Hemu. Both the wings of the Mughal army had been driven back, and Hemu moved his contingent of war elephants and cavalry forward to crush their centre. It was at this point that Hemchandra, possibly on the cusp of victory, was wounded when he was struck in the eye by a chance Mughal arrow and collapsed unconscious. Seeing him going down triggered a panic in his army which broke formation and fled. The battle was lost; 5,000 dead lay on the field of battle and many more were killed while fleeing.

== Aftermath ==
The elephant carrying the unconscious and almost dead Hemchandra was captured after several hours of finishing the battle and led to the Mughal camp. Bairam Khan asked the 13-year-old Akbar to behead Hemchandra. According to Akbar's later courtier Abu'l-Fazl ibn Mubarak, he refused to take the sword to a dead man. However, this is not attested by contemporary writer Muhammad Arif Qandhari (composed Tarikh e Akbari), who mentioned that Akbar followed Bairam Khan's advice and himself beheaded Hemchandra and took the title of Ghazi. The account of Akbar's refusal to kill Hemu is probably a later invention of his courtiers. Hemchandra's head was sent to Kabul to be hanged outside Delhi Darwaja, while his body was gibbeted on a gate in Purana Quila, Delhi, where he had his coronation on 6 October. Several supporters and relatives of Hemchandra were beheaded, and a minaret was later erected. The painting of this minarette is one of the popular 56 paintings of Akbar's life in his copy of the Akbarnama. A memorial for Hemchandra was erected at the spot in Panipat where he was beheaded. It is now known as Hemu's Samadhi Sthal.

With the passing of Hemchandra, Adil Shah's fortunes also took a turn for the worse. He was defeated and killed by Khizr Khan, son of Muhammad Khan Sur of Bengal, in April 1557. The spoils from the battle at Panipat included 120 of Hemu's war elephants, whose destructive rampages so impressed the Mughals that the animals soon became an integral part of their military strategies.

== See also ==
- First Battle of Panipat
- Third Battle of Panipat
