= Panipat Municipal Corporation =

Local civic body in Panipat, Haryana, India

Type
- Type: Municipal Corporation
- Term limits: 5 years

History
- Founded: 17 March 2010; 15 years ago

Leadership
- Mayor: Komal Saini, BJP since March 2025
- Municipal Commissioner: Pankaj, IAS

Structure
- Seats: 26
- Political groups: Government (23): BJP (23); Others (3): IND (3)
- Length of term: 5 years

Elections
- Voting system: First-past-the-post
- Last election: 9 March 2025
- Next election: 2030

Meeting place
- Panipat, Haryana

Website
- nagarnigampanipat.in

Municipal Corporation of Panipat or Panipat Municipal Corporation is responsible for the civic administration of the UA city Panipat in Panipat district, Haryana, India. This was a municipal council established in 1867. In 2010 this was converted to Municipal Corporation. Municipal Corporation mechanism in India was introduced during British Rule with formation of municipal corporation in Madras (Chennai) in 1688, later followed by municipal corporations in Bombay (Mumbai) and Calcutta (Kolkata) by 1762. Panipat Municipal Corporation has been formed with functions to improve the infrastructure of town.

== History and administration ==
Panipat Municipal Corporation was formed to improve the infrastructure of the town as per the needs of local population. Panipat Municipal Corporation has been categorised into wards and each ward is headed by councillor for which elections are held every 5 years.

Panipat Municipal Corporation is governed by mayor and administered by Municipal Commissioner Dr. Pankaj.

== Earlier Municipal Commissioners ==
- Yashender Singh.

== Geography ==
The Panipat Municipal Corporation located at 29.3937°N 76.9694°E in Panipat in the state of Haryana, India.
