= Muhammad Khan Sur =

Sultan of Bengal from 1553 to 1555

Shamsuddin Muhammad Shah
- as-Sulṭān Shams ad-Dunyā wa ad-Dīn Abu al-Muẓaffar Muḥammad Shāh Ghāzī
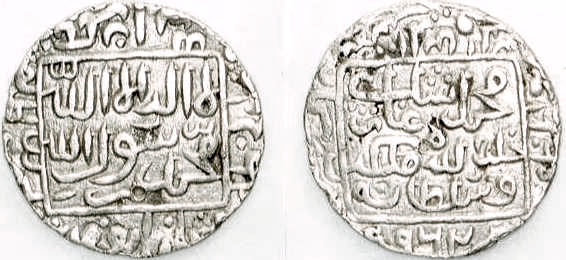
- Coin of Shams al-Din Muhammad. Sultan of Bengal, 962 AH (1554–1555 AD). Obverse: Shahada. Reverse: Name and titles of Shams al-Din Muhammad Shah Ghazi.

22nd Sultan of Bengal
- Reign: 1553–December 1555
- Coronation: 1553
- Predecessor: Ghiyasuddin Mahmud Shah as Sultan; Shahbaz Khan Suri as Governor
- Successor: Ghiyasuddin Bahadur Shah II

Governor of Bengal
- Reign: 1545–1553
- Predecessor: Qazi Fazilat
- Successor: Shahbaz Khan Suri
- Born: Muḥammad Khān Sūr
- Died: December 1555; Chapar Ghata, Sur Empire
- Burial: 1555
- Issue: Khizr and Jalal
- House: Muhammad Shahi
- Dynasty: Sur
- Religion: Sunni Islam

Muhammad Khan Sur (Note: Bengali: মুহম্মদ খান সূর; Persian: محمد خان سور), also known by his regnal title Shamsuddin Muhammad Shah Ghazi, was the Sultan of Bengal from 1553 to 1555. He was initially appointed as a governor of Bengal by Emperor Islam Shah Suri of the Sur Empire in 1545, but after his death, he declared independence and re-established the Bengal Sultanate. He conquered Arakan in present-day Burma, and ordered striking of silver 'tanka' coins for Bengal.

== Governor of Bengal ==
Qazi Fazilat's term as Chief of all of the Muqtas of Bengal ended following the death of Emperor Sher Shah Suri in 1545. The next emperor, Islam Shah Suri, appointed Muhammad Khan to govern Bengal. Muhammad peacefully governed Bengal, subordinate to the emperor. However, following Islam Shah's death in 1553, Muhammad declared independence from Delhi, effectively reestablishing the weakening Bengal Sultanate by starting his own dynasty.

== Sultan of Bengal ==
During his reign, Muhammad Shah conquered Arakan where he began minting coins from. His issued coins bore the Shahada and the names of the four Rashidun; Abu Bakr, Omar, Uthman and Ali. This signified his Sunni Muslim religious beliefs. Unlike the Sur emperors, Muhammad Shah dropped the use of Devanagari script on coins. He also reconquered Chittagong from the Twipra Kingdom, and his legitimate authority was recognised as far as Bihar.

Vying for power in North India, Muhammad Shah conquered Jaunpur and proceeded for Delhi, the capital of the Sur Empire. In 1555, he fought a battle in Chapar Ghata against Islam Shah's successor, Adil Shah. In that battle Muhammad Shah was defeated and killed by Adil's general, Hemu.

== Succession ==
Muhammad Shah's eldest son, Khidr, ascended the independent throne of Bengal as Ghiyasuddin Bahadur Shah II. However, Adil Shah did not recognise this as a legitimate position and he appointed Shahbaz Khan Suri to be the governor of Bengal under him.

Preceded by Qazi Fazilat	Governor of Bengal; 1545-1555	Succeeded by Shahbaz Khan Suri

Preceded by Muhammad Adil Shah as Sultan of Delhi	Sultan of Bengal; 1554-1555	Succeeded by Ghiyasuddin Bahadur Shah II

== Family tree ==
Muhammad Shahi Dynasty

Muhammad Shah III ?–1555; Sultan of Bengal; R.1554–1555
Bahadur Shah II ?–1561; Sultan of Bengal; R.1555–1561	Jalal Shah ?–1563; Sultan of Bengal; R.1561–1563
Bahadur Shah III ?–1564; Sultan of Bengal; R.1563–1564

== See also ==
- List of rulers of Bengal
- History of Bengal
- History of India
