= Khidr Khan Surak =

Governor of Bengal from 1539 to 1541 CE

Governor of Bengal (Sur Empire)
- In office 1539–1541
- Monarch: Sher Shah Suri
- Preceded by: Sher Shah Suri
- Succeeded by: Qazi Fazilat
- Relatives: Ghiyasuddin Mahmud Shah (father-in-law)

Khiḍr Khān Surak (Bengali: খিজির খাঁ সুরক, romanized: Khizir Khã Shurok, Persian: خضر خان سرک) was the governor of Bengal from 1539 to 1541 CE.

== History ==
When Sher Shah Suri ascended to the throne of Delhi in 1539, he appointed Khidr Khan to govern the province of Bengal.

In 1541, Sher Shah Suri, who recognised the importance of the Bengal province for the development of the Sur Empire, was informed of a number of Khan's treacherous acts. He was informed of Khan's marriage to a daughter of Ghiyasuddin Mahmud Shah, who was the late Sultan of the Bengal Sultanate's former Hussain Shahi dynasty that Suri defeated in 1538. It is thought that Khan married the late Sultan's daughter as a method to claim independence and be known as the rightful sovereign heir of the Hussain Shahi dynasty. Suri set off for Bengal to deal with Khan. Upon reaching him, Suri questioned Khan on why he married the princess without his consent and why he was sat on the Tawqi (raised platform) as the independent Sultans of Bengal used to do. As a result of Khan's treachery, Suri swiftly dismissed him as governor and imprisoned him. Suri then divided Bengal into numerous administrative units, each governed by a Muqta (the title of a designated provincial governor) and then appointed Qazi Fazilat of Agra as the chief of all of the Muqtas of Bengal.

| Preceded by Sher Shah Suri | Governor of Bengal; 1539–1541 | Succeeded by Qazi Fazilat |

== See also ==
- List of rulers of Bengal
- History of Bengal
- History of Bangladesh
- History of India
