= Ghiyasuddin Jalal Shah =

Sultan of Bengal from 1561 to 1563

- as-Sulṭān Ghiyāth ad-Dunyā wa ad-Dīn Abū al-Muẓaffar Jalāl Shāh Ghāzī
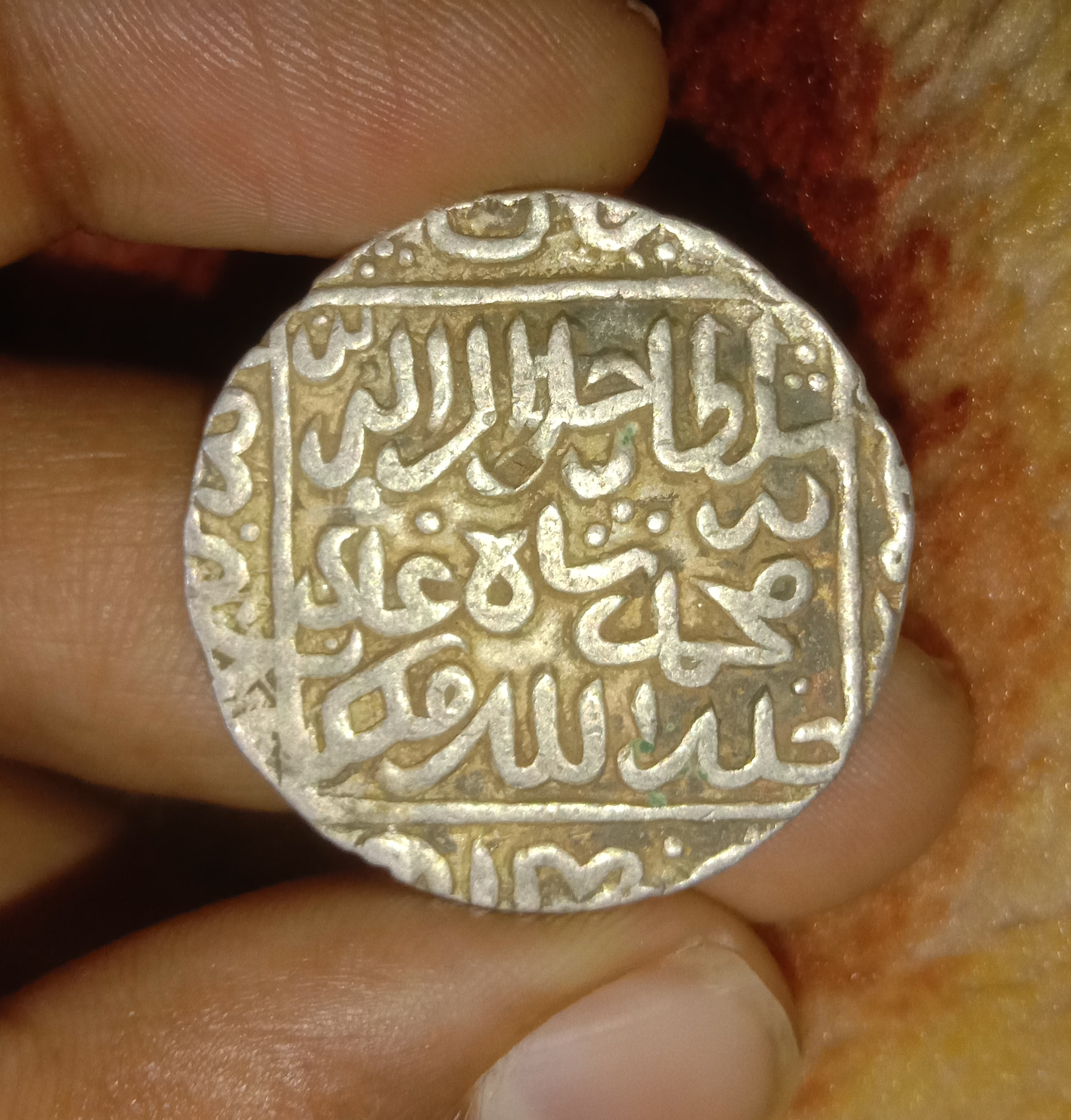
- Silver Tanka of the Bengal Sultan Ghiyath al-din Jalal Shah, struck in Satgaon.

24th Sultan of Bengal
- Reign: 1561–1563
- Coronation: 1561
- Predecessor: Bahadur Shah II
- Successor: Bin Jalal Shah; Bahadur Shah III
- Born: Jalāl Khān Sūr; 16th-century
- Died: 1563; Bengal Sultanate
- Burial: 1563
- House: Muhammad Shahi
- Father: Muhammad Khan Sur
- Religion: Sunni Islam

Ghiyasuddin Jalal Shah (Bengali: গিয়াসউদ্দীন জলাল শাহ, Persian: غیاث الدین جلال شاه) was the Sultan of Bengal from 1561 to 1563. He was the brother and successor of Sultan Ghiyasuddin Bahadur Shah II.

== Biography ==
Jalal was born into a Sunni Muslim family of noblemen. Emperor Islam Shah Suri had appointed his father, Muhammad Khan Sur, as the governor of Bengal. However, Muhammad later declared independence from Delhi, effectively establishing a new dynasty to an independent Bengal Sultanate. He was later succeeded by his elder son known as Ghiyasuddin Bahadur Shah II.

== Reign ==
Following the natural death of his brother Bahadur Shah II, Jalal rose to the throne as the third sultan of the Muhammad Shahi dynasty. During his reign, Hajipur and Satgaon remained strongholds, where he had coins minted. Jalal ruled for three years, before being assassinated by Ghiyasuddin Bahadur Shah III in 1563. According to the Riyaz-us-Salatin however, Jalal Shah ruled for five years and was succeeded by his son after his death, who was killed by Ghiyasuddin Bahadur Shah III during a short rule of seven months and nine days.

Preceded by Ghiyasuddin Bahadur Shah II	Sultan of Bengal; 1561–1563	Succeeded by Bin Jalal Shah; Ghiyasuddin Bahadur Shah III

== See also ==
- List of rulers of Bengal
- History of Bengal
- History of Bangladesh
