= Chapar Ghata =

Fort village in Uttar Pradesh, India

Coordinates: 26°10′3″N 79°55′44″E

Mughal Period bridge over the Sengar River

Chapar Ghata is a fort village in Kanpur Dehat district in the state of Uttar Pradesh, India. Chapar Ghata is located in Amraudha block of Bhognipur tehsil.

Musanagar, an ancient town, is about 3 kilometres (1.9 mi) east of it. The nearest railway station is at Pukhrayan.

== History ==
Chapar Ghata occupies the site of an old crossing on the Sengar River. There is a fort made during Mughal Period, along with a bridge on the Mughal Road (NH 2A) over the Sengar River. Since old Mughal Road passes through the village, there is a Kos Minar in its vicinity, and also at Rajpur and Khalaspur.

In the early 20th Century, Chapar Ghata was subject of litigation by nearby villagers who wanted to transport their cattle through the village's forests; the courts ruled that no right of way, easement, or 'straggling right' existed allowing the neighboring farmers to drive their cattle through Chapar Ghata.

== Demographics ==
As of the 2001 India census, Chapar Ghata had a population of 2,790. Males constituted 52.5% of the population, and females 42.5%.

As of the 2011 India census, the village has a population of 3,112; 1,662 are males (53.4% of the population) while 1,450 are females (46.6 %). Overall average literacy is 62.93%, which is lower than the state average.
