= Qazi Fazilat =

Qadi Fazilat Amin-i-Bangalah Shershahi

Amin of Bengal
- In office 1541–1545
- Monarch: Sher Shah Suri
- Preceded by: Khidr Khan
- Succeeded by: Muhammad Khan Sur

Personal details
- Relatives: Qazi Yaqub of Manikpur (son-in-law)
- Nickname: Qazi Fazihat

Qazi Fazilat Shershahi (Bengali: কাজী ফজ়িলত শেরশাহী, Persian: قاضی فضیلت) was an army qadi for Sher Shah Suri and later a governor of Bengal under the Sur Empire from 1541 to 1545.

== Biography ==
The governor of Bengal, Khidr Khan, attempted to declare independence from the Sur Empire in 1541. However, his plan was unsuccessful and was dismissed from the office as governor by Emperor Sher Shah Suri. The Emperor then appointed Qazi Fazilat as the Amin of Bengal and superintendent of Rohtas Fort.

Fazilat (meaning virtue) was said to have been an easygoing and lighthearted man. Satirically, people would refer to him as Qazi Fazihat (meaning infamy) and that became a very popular nickname of his. This name has passed on as a humorous expression used in the Eastern Bengali dialects.

His term ended at the death of Sher Shah Suri. Fazilat was succeeded by Muhammad Khan Sur in 1545 who would also declare independence.

Preceded by Khidr Khan (Bengal)	Amin of Bengal; 1541–1545	Succeeded by Muhammad Khan Sur

== See also ==
- List of rulers of Bengal
- History of Bengal
- History of Bangladesh
- History of India
