= Panipat =

Place in Haryana

Panipat Pandavprastha
- city, administrative division
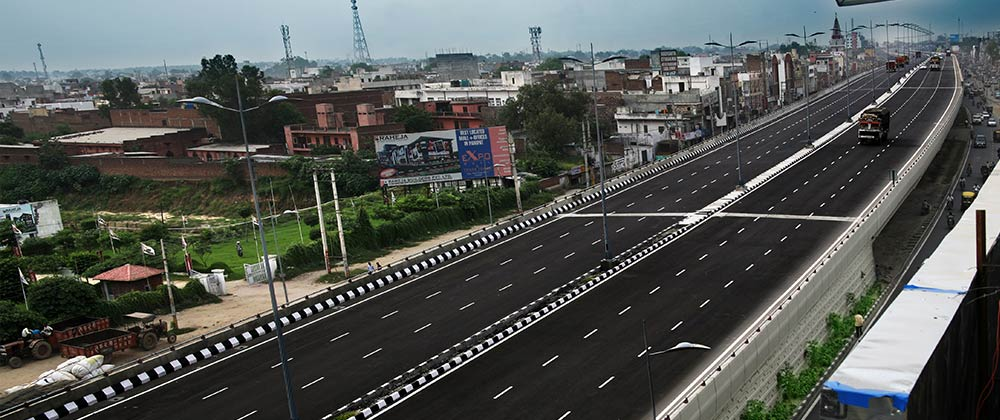
- Panipat Elevated Expressway

- Location in Haryana, India Panipat (India)
- Coordinates: 29°23′15″N 76°58′12″E
- Country: India
- State: Haryana
- District: Panipat district

Government
  - Type: Municipal Corporation
  - Body: Panipat Municipal Corporation
  - Mayor: Komal Saini (BJP)
  - Lok Sabha MP: Manohar Lal Khattar (BJP)
  - MLA: Parmod Kumar Vij (BJP)
  - Municipal Commissioner: Pankaj (IAS)

Area
  - Total: 1,268 km^{2} (490 sq mi)
- Elevation: 219 m (719 ft)

Population
  - Total: 294,150
  - Density: 232.0/km^{2} (600.8/sq mi)

Language
  - Official: Hindi
  - Regional: Haryanvi
- Time zone: UTC+5:30 (IST)
- PIN: 132103
- Telephone code: +91 180
- ISO 3166 code: IN-HR
- Vehicle registration: HR-06 (Private Vehicles) HR-67 (Commercial Vehicles)
- Website: http://panipat.gov.in

Panipat (päː.niː.pɐt̪) historically known as Pandavprastha is an industrial city, located 95 km north of Delhi and 169 km south of Chandigarh on NH-44 in Panipat district, Haryana, India. It is famous for three major battles fought in 1526, 1556 and 1761. The city is also known as 'city of weavers', 'textile city' and 'cast-off clothes capital' of the world. It is home to industries like wool and cotton milling, saltpetre refining and manufacture of glass, electrical appliances, and other products. The city is included in the list of critically polluted industrial areas in India. As in Dec 2009, the Comprehensive Environment Pollution Index (CEPI) of the city was 59.00, as against 88.50 of Ankaleshwar (Gujarat). The three battles fought in the fatal field of Panipat changed the course of India's history, first two resulting in creation and confirmation of the Mughal Empire. The third battle led to the decisive defeat of the Maratha Confederacy in North India, which had become a dominating power in Delhi by then and enabled the British Empire's Company rule in India .

== Etymology ==
Borrowed from Hindi पानीपत (pānīpat), Pani (water) Pat means (Bank) "Panipat". As per another version, it is derived from Pandavprasth, i.e. 'Pani' as a short form of 'Pandav' and 'pat' as a short form of 'prasth'.It was also known as Panprastha.

== History ==
=== Inception ===
Panipat district was carved out from the erstwhile Karnal district on 1 November 1989. On 24 July 1991, it was again merged with Karnal district. On 1 January 1992, it again became a separate district.

==== Reason behind the merger ====
Panipat, while being carved out as a separate district firstly, included the "Assandh Tehsil" area. To add the "Assandh Tehsil" area back to Karnal, Panipat was merged with Karnal. Afterwards, Panipat was again carved out of Karnal for the second time, and excluded the "Assandh Tehsil" area.

=== Battles ===
Panipat was the scene of three pivotal battles that changed the history of Indian Subcontinent.

==== First ====
The First Battle of Panipat was fought on 21 April 1526 between Ibrahim Lodi, the Afghan Sultan of Delhi, and the Turko-Mongol warlord Babur, who later established Mughal rule in Northern Indian subcontinent. Babur's force defeated Ibrahim's much larger force of over one lakh (100,000) soldiers because of the technological advantage of field artillery. This first battle of Panipat thus ended the Lodi Rule established by Bahlul Lodi in Delhi. This battle marked the beginning of Mughal rule in India.

==== Second ====
The Second Battle of Panipat was fought on 5 November 1556 between the forces of Akbar and Hem Chandra Vikramaditya, the last Hindu emperor of Delhi. Hem Chandra, who had captured states like Agra and Delhi defeating Akbar's army and declared himself as independent king after a coronation on 7 October 1556 at Purana Qila in Delhi, had a large army, and initially his forces were winning, but suddenly he was struck by an arrow in the eye and fell unconscious. On not seeing him in his howdah on the back of an elephant, his army fled. The unconscious Hemu was carried to Akbar's camp where Bairam Khan beheaded him. According to the historic sources Hemu and his army consisted of 1500 war elephants and a vanguard of artillery park.

Panipat is listed in the Ain-i-Akbari as a pargana under Delhi Sarkar and supplying a force of 1000 infantry and 100 cavalry under Mughal Empire. It had a brick fort at the time which was also mentioned.

==== Third ====
The Third Battle of Panipat was fought on 14 January 1761. The Maratha Empire provoked the King of Afghanistan, Ahmad Shah Durrani. The Maratha Empire forces were led by Sadashivrao Bhau and the Afghans were led by Ahmad Shah Abdali. The Afghan coalition had 70,000 total strength of soldiers, and the Marathas had 60,000 soldiers and 120,000 pilgrims.

== Geography ==
Panipat is located at 29.3875°N 76.9700°E. It has an average elevation of 219 meters (718 feet).

== Demographics ==
Panipat official website data: Check at https://panipat.gov.in/

As per 2011 census:

- Population: 294,292.

The population has grown by 24.33% compared to the 2001 census.

- Literacy rate: 83%.
- Population density: 949 people per km^{2}.
- Sex ratio: 861 females per 1000 males
- Child sex ratio: 833 girls per 1000 boys.
- Hindus: 83.39%
- Muslims: 12.03%
- Sikhs: 4.13%
- Jains: 0.25%
- Christians: 0.05%
- Other religions and persuasions: 0.14%
- Buddhists: No data available

== Industries ==
=== Industrial Estate ===
Panipat has an industrial zone named Industrial Estate Panipat. Industrial Estate Panipat is located on Refinery Road connecting National Highway 44. It is spread over fully developed 926 Acres of land having all the infrastructure facilities such as Roads, Water / Sewerage system, common effluent treatment plant and Power House along with all electrical infrastructure.

=== Products ===
Panipat is famous for Fertilizers, Home Furnishing, Printing press, PVC manufacturing and Fabrication industries.

The city produces Indian pickles (achaar) commercially, especially pachranga and satranga (literally "five/seven colours", prepared with that many vegetables). The vegetables are matured in mustard oil and whole spices with ingredients like raw mangoes, chickpeas, lotus stem, karonda, myrobalan, and limes. Pachranga achaar was created in 1930 by Murli Dhar Dhingra in Kaloorkot, a village in the Mianwali District of what is now Pakistan. Dhingra's descendants brought the pickle to India in 1943. As of 2016, Panipat produced over ₹500 million (equivalent to ₹780 million or US$8.4 million in 2026) worth of achaar every year, supplied to local markets and exported to the UK, US, and Middle East.

== Landmarks ==
=== Hemu's Samadhi Sthal ===
King Hemu with large force was captured by Shah Quli Khan in the Second Battle of Panipat and carried to the Mughal camp at Shodapur on Jind Road at Panipat. According to Badayuni, Bairam Khan asked Akbar to behead Hemu so that he could earn the title of Ghazi. Akbar replied, "He is already dead, if he had any strength for a duel, I would have killed him." After Akbar's refusal Hemu's body was denied honour by the Mughal battle tradition and was unceremoniously beheaded by Bairam Khan. Hemu's head was sent to Kabul where it was hung outside the Delhi Darwaza while his body was thrown outside gibbet in Delhi to warn his supporters, who were mainly his subjects, both the Muslims and Hindus.

=== Ibrahim Lodhi's Tomb ===
It was one of Sher Shah Suri's dying regrets that he could never fulfill his intention of erecting a tomb to the fallen monarch Ibrahim Lodhi. Much later, in 1866, the British relocated the tomb which was just a simple grave during construction of the Grand Trunk Road and added a platform to it with an inscription highlighting Ibrahim Lodhi's death in the Battle of Panipat.

=== Babur's Kabuli Bagh Mosque ===
The garden of Kabuli Bagh along with the Kabuli Bagh Mosque and a tank were built by Babur after the First Battle of Panipat to commemorate his victory over Ibrahim Lodhi. Some years later when Humayun defeated Sher Shah Suri near Panipat, he added a masonry Platform to it and called it 'Chabutra" Fateh Mubarak, bearing the inscription 934 Hijri (1557 CE). These buildings and the garden still exist under the name of Kabuli Bagh called so after Babur's wife – Mussammat Kabuli begum.

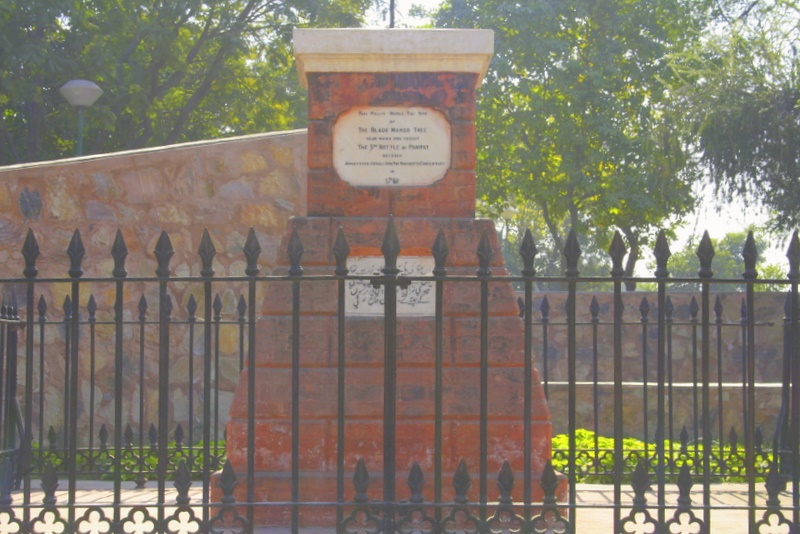
Kala Amb Memorial

=== Kala Amb ===
According to tradition, the site 8 km from Panipat and 42 km from Karnal, where Sadashivrao Bhau commanded his Maratha forces during the third battle of Panipat was marked by a black Mango Tree (Kala Amb) which has since disappeared. The dark colour of its foliage was probably the origin of the name. The site has a brick Pillar with an iron rod and the structure is surrounded by an iron fence. The site is being developed and beautified by a society presided over by the Governor of Haryana.

=== Prachin Sidhh Shree Devi Mandir ===
Shree Devi Mandir is one of the most appealing religious places in Panipat city. Standing along the Devi Mandir Road in the Tehsil Camp Locality and opposite to it is the Cygnus Maharaja Aggrasen Hospital. Here reside the idols of all the Hindu Gods and Goddesses. It used to have a large Sarovar (Water tank for religious practices), but it dried years ago due to a past drought that fell upon Panipat decades ago. It has now been converted into a lush green playground. If you are in Panipat do visit this temple, especially recommended during navratri festival fair.

== Panipat Syndrome ==
The term "Panipat Syndrome" has entered the lexicon as the lack of strategic thinking, preparedness and decisive action by Indian leaders thus allowing an invading army to enter well inside their territory. This is based on the fact that in the three battles fought here, the defending armies were decisively defeated each time. It was coined by Air Commodore Jasjit Singh.
