= Kabuli Bagh Mosque =

Mosque in Haryana, India

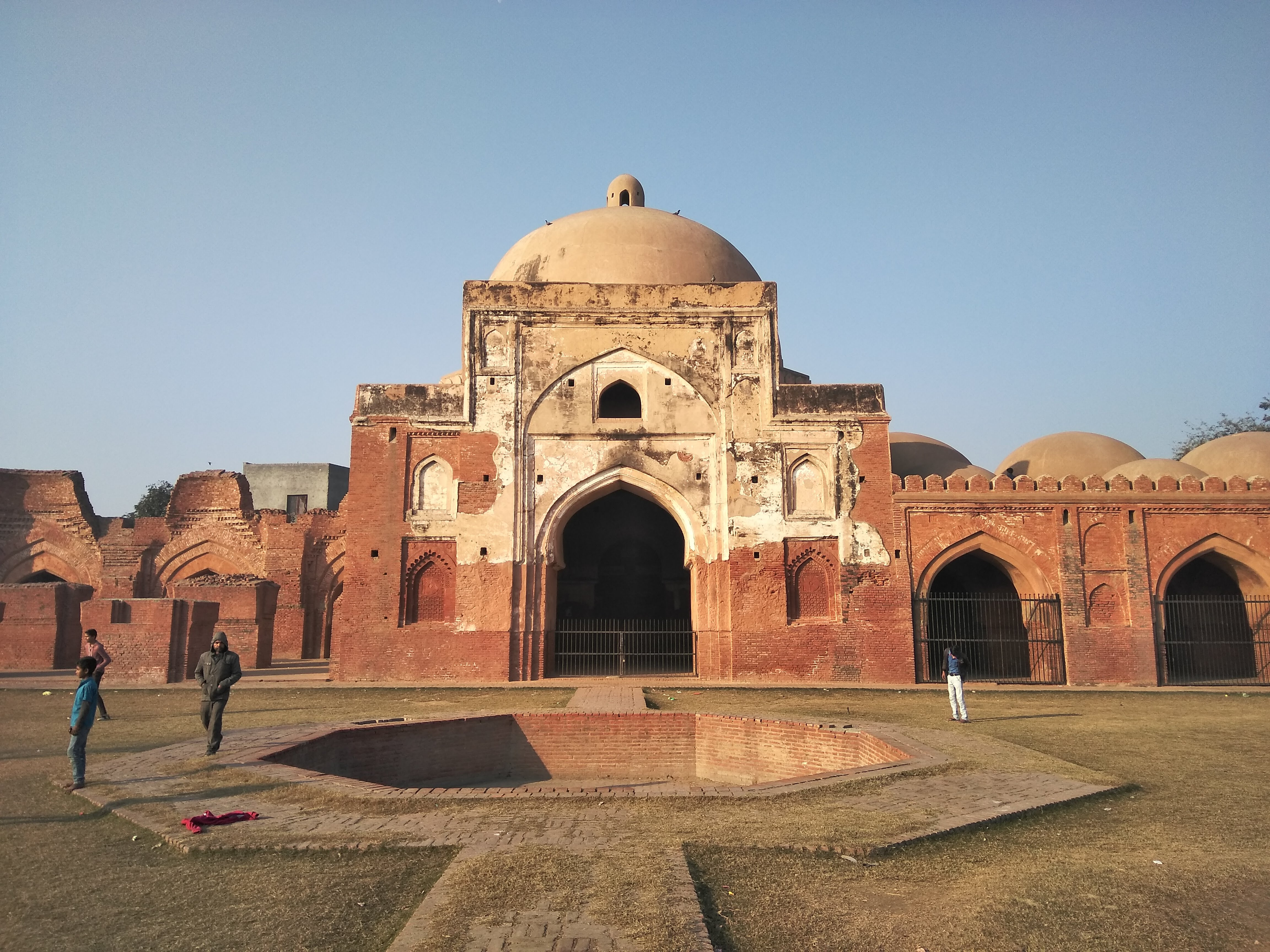
- The mosque in 2018

- Location of the mosque in Haryana

Religion
- Affiliation: Islam
- Ecclesiastical or organisational status: Mosque
- Status: Active

Location
- Location: Bajaj Nagar, Panipat, Panipat district, Haryana
- Country: India
- Coordinates: 29°23′45″N 76°59′21″E

Architecture
- Type: Mosque architecture
- Style: Indo-Islamic; Mughal
- Founder: Babur
- Completed: 1527

Specifications
- Direction of façade: West
- Dome: 1
- Materials: Bricks; red sandstone; marble

Monument of National Importance
- Official name: Kabuli Bagh Mosque with enclosure wall
- Reference no.: N-HR-71

The Kabuli Bagh Mosque is a mosque in Panipat, Haryana, India which was built in 1527 by the emperor Babur to mark his victory over Sultan Ibrahim Lodhi at the first Battle of Panipat in 1526. The mosque is named after Kabuli Begum, Babur's wife. The mosque and surrounding enclosure wall are a Monument of National Importance.

== Location ==
The Kabul Bagh historical place located in Kabuli Bag Colony, Panipat in Panipat district, is 2 kilometres (1.2 mi) away from Panipat town.

== History ==
=== Construction of mosque ===
The main building was built in 1527. Emperor Babur of the Timurid dynasty defeated Sultan Ibrahim Lodi in the first Battle of Panipat in 1526 at Panipat. It was the first conquest of the Mughals over Hindustan. A descendant of Timur, Babur built this monument as a show of victory of the Mughals over the Pashtun rulers of India. He built the Kabuli Bagh mosque in 1527.

=== Addition of gates and garden ===
In 1527, the gate and the garden surrounding it were built.

When Babur's son, Humayun, defeated Sher Shah Suri's descendants near Panipat, he added a masonry platform to it and called it "Chabutra" Fateh Mubarak, bearing the inscription 934 Hijri (1557 CE). These buildings and the garden still exist under the name of Kabuli Bagh, called so after Babur's wife – Mussammat Kabuli Begum.

== Architecture ==
Its architecture is to some extent a replica of royal mosques in Samarqand with large arched domes. Babur could not replicate the Timurid architecture fully, as trained artisans and engineers were not available in India in creating this type of architecture.

There is an inscription dated 1527 which mentions the name of the King and the Queen and details about the builder. This inscription is on a distinct black marble stone. The entire gate was built with bricks and red sandstone.

== Features ==
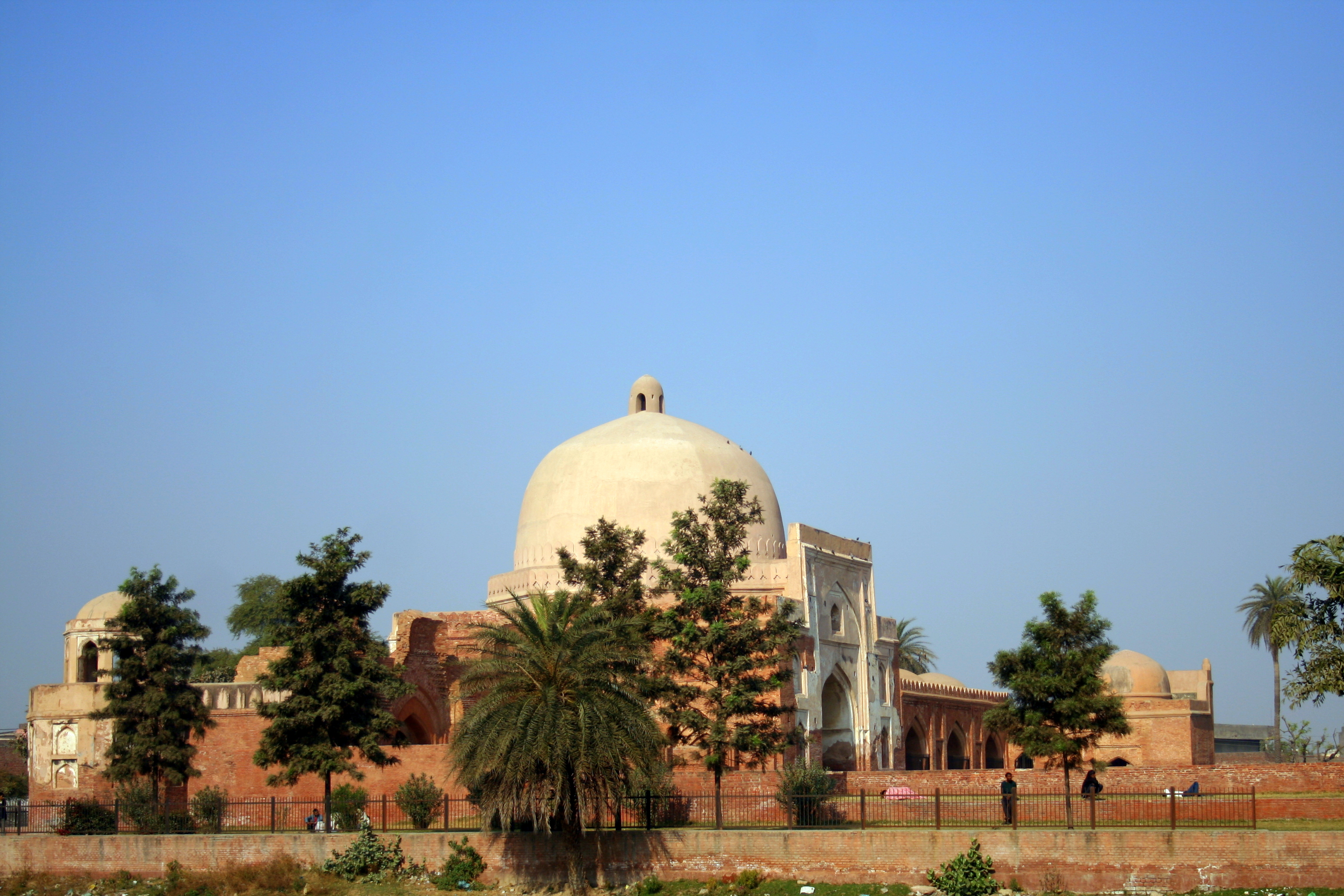
View of the mosque's dome.

The mosque, built with bricks and stucco plaster within a compound wall, faces north. The corners of the mosque have towers of octagonal shape on the northwest and south west directions.

Its entry gate, built with bricks and red sandstone, has an enclosed "bracket type lintel" opening of which is shaped like a large arch; its spandrels have ornamentation, enclosed in rectangular panels provided with arched recesses. The prayer hall is large and measures 53.75 by 16.5 metres (176 by 54 ft), and is covered by a large dome.

There is a Qibla, a niche in the prayer chamber wall which is oriented towards Mecca. This central bay is visible even from the outside through its wide entrance opening. The mihrab here has an epigraph which includes the "Throne Verse from the Quran".

The prayer chamber is flanked on either side by "three-bayed triple-aisled side wings". The front face of the mosque is high and is made up of panels which have stucco work of lime plaster. Each of the two wings have nine bays and each bay is topped by a hemispherical dome founded on low cylindrical tholobates. The parapet wall has Persian inscriptions. A Chabutra-i-Fateh Mubarak is a masonry platform which surrounds the mosque, which was built during the reign of Humayun to mark his victory over Salim Shah. There is also a northern stone gate in the courtyard.

== See also ==
- Aga Khan Historic Cities Support Programme
- Humayun's Tomb
- Ibrahim Lodhi's Tomb
- Islam in India
- List of mosques in India
- List of Monuments of National Importance in Haryana
- Lodi Gardens in Delhi
