= Virtue Party (Azerbaijan) =

Azerbaijan political party

The Virtue Party (Azerbaijani: Fəzilət Partiyası) is a political party of Azerbaijan. Its founding congress was held 20 June 2005; Gündüz Hacıyev was elected chairman. The party claims some 2,000 members; one of its principles is the restoration of Azeri control over the contested Nagorno-Karabakh region.
