= Ghiyasuddin Bahadur Shah II =

Sultan of Bengal from 1555 to 1561

Ghiyasuddin Bahadur Shah II (Note: Bengali: দ্বিতীয় গিয়াসউদ্দিন বাহাদুর শাহ; Persian: غیاث الدین بهادر شاه ثانی) (also Khizr Khan Suri; r. 1555–1561) was an independent ruler of Bengal. He was the son of Sultan Shamsuddin Muhammad Shah.

== Reign ==
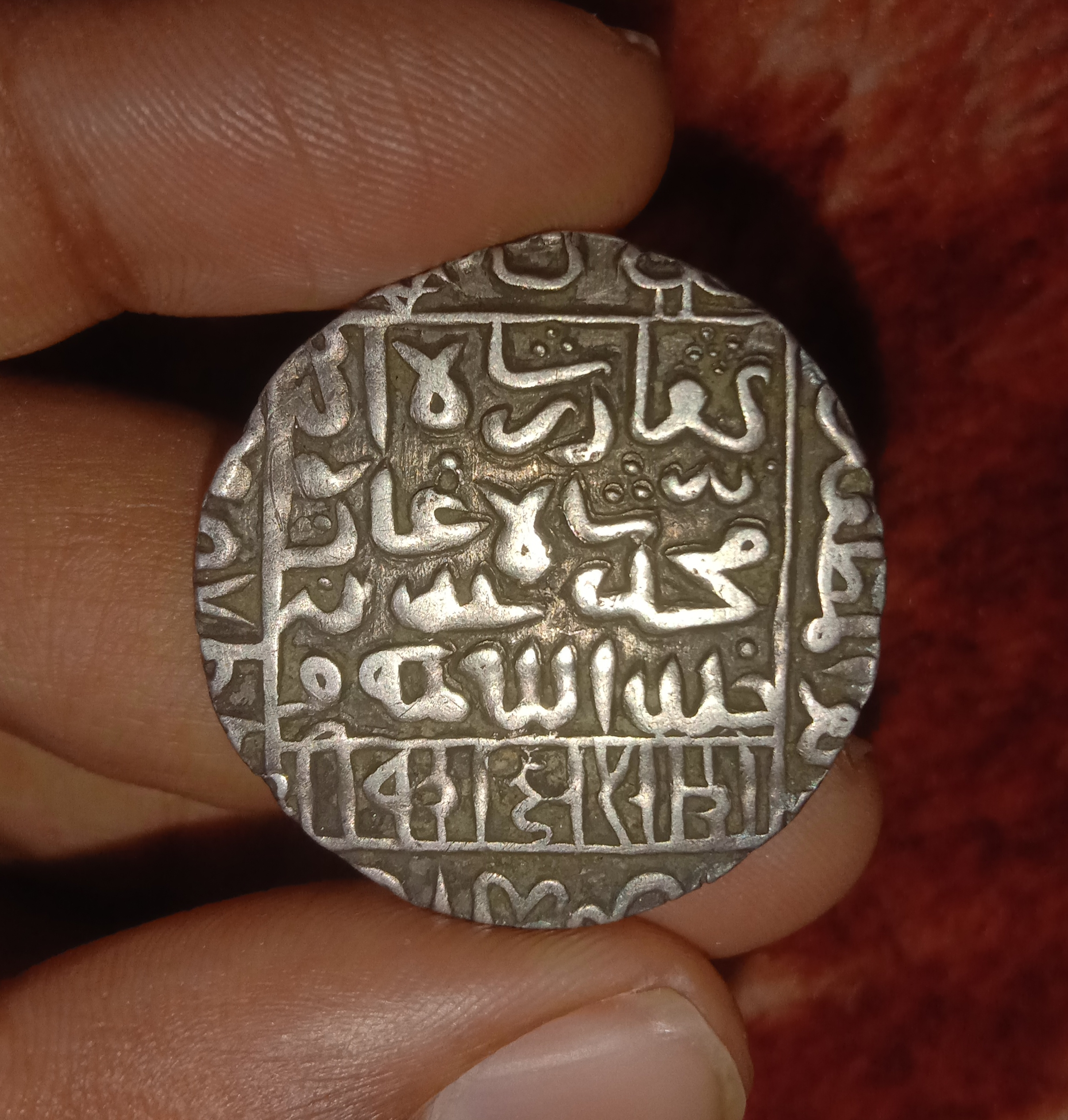
Silver Tanka of the Bengal Sultan Ghiyath al-din Bahadur Shah II, struck in Khitta Lakhnauti.

Bahadur Shah came to power after deposing the governor Shahbaz Khan. During his reign, Bahadur Shah killed Muhammad Adil Shah in 1557. In his regime, coins (silver 'tanka') for Bengal sultanate were struck in the mint of Arakan.

Later Bahadur Shah tried to capture Jaunpur but he was defeated by Mughal forces.

== Biography ==
In his youth, his name was Khizr Khan. He participated in his father's military and administrative affairs. In 1554, when Muhammad Khan assumed the title of Sultan, Khizr Khan became his heir. In 1555, after the death of his father, he inherited power.

He continued the struggle against Sultan Muhammad Adil Shah, who managed to occupy Bengal and appoint Shahbaz Khan as Sarkar (military governor). However, the rise of Ibrahim Khan forced Muhammad Adil to return to the north. Khizr Khan took advantage of this, who defeated Shahbaz Khan, restoring the independence of Bengal. He assumed the title of Sultan and the name Ghiyasuddin Bahadur Shah II.

He continued to fight against Muhammad Adil, and then Sikandar Shah and Adil Shah. In 1557, he defeated the latter, and then captured and executed the former sultan Muhammad Adil. However, an attempt to capture the important city of Jaunpur met with resistance from the Mughal army of the Sultan Akbar, so he had to limit himself to Bihar.

At the same time, he was forced to cede the port of Chittagong to Min Saw Hla, the ruler of Kingdom of Mrauk U, and to recognize his independence from the Bengal Sultanate. He soon overthrew the dependency of the principality of Twipra (in the northeast).

He died suddenly in 1561. He was succeeded by his brother Ghiyasuddin Jalal Shah.

Preceded by Muhammad Khan Sur	Sultan of Bengal; 1555–1561	Succeeded by Ghiyasuddin Jalal Shah

== See also ==
- List of rulers of Bengal
- History of Bengal
- History of India
