= First Battle of Panipat =

1526 battle during the Mughal conquest of the Delhi Sultanate

- Part of Mughal conquests
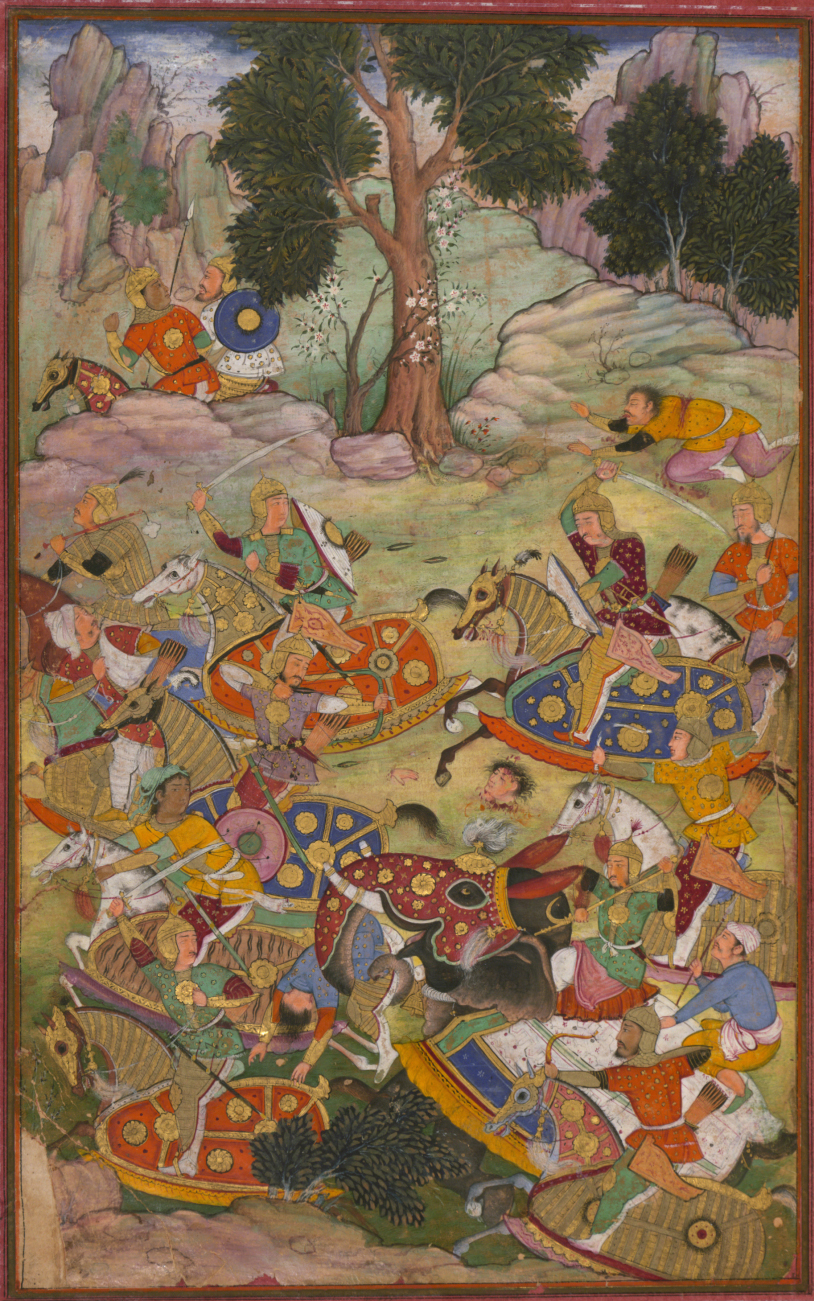
- The battle of Panipat and the death of Sultan Ibrāhīm
Date	21 April 1526
Location	Panipat (present-day Haryana, India) 29°24′6″N 76°58′22″E
Result	Mughal victory
Territorial changes	Delhi Sultanate annexed by the Mughal dynasty

Belligerents
Emirate of Kabul	Delhi Sultanate

Commanders and leaders
Babur	Ibrahim Khan Lodi †

Strength
12,000; 15–20 cannon	50,000–70,000; 1,000 war elephants

Casualties and losses
	20,000 killed
- Location within South Asia Battle of Panipat (Haryana)

The First Battle of Panipat, on 21 April 1526 was fought between the invading forces of Babur against Ibrahim Khan Lodi, the Sultan of Delhi, in North India. Babur's forces, employing gunpowder firearms and cannons, defeated Ibrahim. This was one of the earliest battles involving gunpowder arms on the Indian subcontinent. The victory marked the beginning of Mughal rule in India.

== Background ==
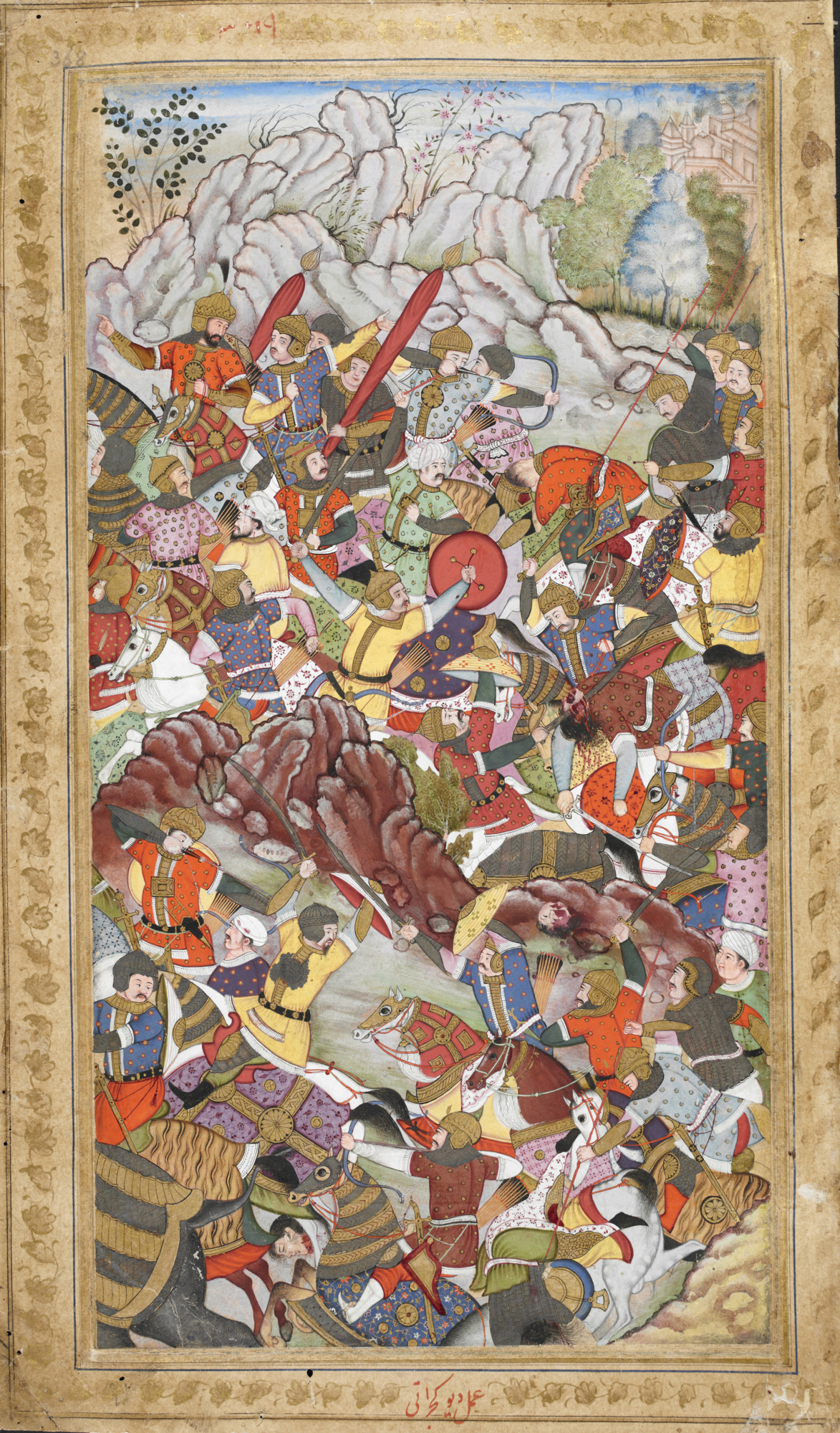
The battle of Panipat between the armies of Babur and Ibrahim Lodi (1526). Babur was invited by Daulat Khan Lodi to enter India and defeat Ibrahim Lodi. An illustration to the Vaqi 'at-i Baburi, by Deo Gujarati, c. 1590.

In 1504, Babur succeeded his late uncle Ulugh Beg II by force of arms, taking control of the latter's kingdom based around Kabul and Ghazni. Opposed by Muhammad Shaybani to the northwest, Babur sought to expand his kingdom to the southeast, into Punjab, the land of the five rivers. By 1519, he had reached the Chenab River.

At that time, most of North India was part of the Delhi Sultanate, under the rule of Ibrahim Lodi of the Lodi dynasty. However, Ibrahim was locked in a power struggle with his relatives and ministers. Daulat Khan Lodi, Governor of Punjab, offered to defect to Babur. Babur started for Lahore, in 1524 but found that Daulat had been driven out by forces sent by Ibrahim. The Lodi army marched out to engage Babur and was routed. Babur also took control of Jhelum, Sialkot, Kalanaur and Dipalpur before returning to Kabul. He placed Dipalpur under control of Alam Khan, a rebel uncle of Ibrahim.

At the end of 1525, Babur was to return to northern India, crossing the Indus in December. After securing his conquest of Punjab, Babur advanced towards Delhi. It was at Panipat he was to meet and engage a much larger army assembled by Ibrahim.

== Battle ==
Ibrahim's army is reported to have had an effective strength of between 50,000 and 70,000 with 1,000 war elephants but lacked gunpowder arms. (Note: The army has been reported to have consisted of 30,000 infantry and 40,000 cavalry, of which half the cavalry were irregular troops.) Babur's army was 12,000 strong. At least part of the force were equipped with matchlock muskets. His cavalry fought as horse archers. He also had between 15 and 20 cannons.

Babur defended his position with 700 wagons tied together in a line. Between every second wagon was a breastwork for his musketeers to fire from. At several places in the line, he left sally points 150 riders wide for his cavalry to advance through. Babur secured his right flank against the city of Panipat. On the left, he dug a trench filled with branches as an obstacle against cavalry.

When Ibrahim attacked, the frontage presented by Babur was too narrow for him to effectively employ his force. Musket and cannon pinned Ibrahim's centre while horse archers harried the flanks and rear. The noise of cannon panicked the elephants, adding to the casualties. Ibrahim and 20,000 of his men were killed in the battle. Thousands more died as the army retreated.

== Aftermath ==
The battle of Panipat was militarily a decisive victory for Babur. However, to secure his position, Babur was still to fight the Mewar ruler Rana Sanga at Khanwa in 1527, and the eastern Afghans at the Ghaghra River in 1529. Politically it gained Babur new lands and initiated a new phase of his establishment of the Mughal Empire in the heart of the Indian subcontinent – an empire that lasted for over 300 years.

== Sources ==
- Butalia, Romesh C. (1998). The Evolution of the Artillery in India: From the Battle of Plassey to the Revolt of 1857. Allied Publishing Limited.
- Chandra, Satish (2009). Medieval India: From Sultanat to the Mughals, Part II. Har-Anand Publications. ISBN 9788124110669.
- Chaurasia, Radhey Shyam (2002). History of medieval India : from 1000 A.D. to 1707 A.D. Atlantic Publisher.
- Davis, Paul K. (1999). 100 Decisive Battles: From Ancient Times to the Present. Oxford University Press. ISBN 1-57607-075-1.
- Eraly, Abraham (2007). Emperors Of The Peacock Throne: The Saga of the Great Moghuls. Penguin Books Limited. ISBN 978-93-5118-093-7.
- Mahajan, V.D. (1980). History of medieval India (10th ed.). S. Chand.
- Watts, Tim J. (2011). "Battles of Panipat". In Mikaberidze, Alexander (ed.). Conflict and Conquest in the Islamic World: A Historical Encyclopedia. ABC-CLIO.
- Government of Haryana (11 June 2010). "First Battle of Panipat (1526) | Panipat, Haryana". Government of Haryana. Archived from the original on 13 April 2024.
