= List of heads of state of India =

From the independence of India in 1947 to the present day, sixteen individuals have served as head of state of India. The current head of state of India is Droupadi Murmu, elected in 2022 after being nominated by the National Democratic Alliance.

The first major empire to use such a title was the Mughal Empire, whose emperors formally used the title Emperor of Hindustan after Babur defeated Ibrahim Khan Lodi at the First Battle of Panipat in 1526 A.D. When the Mughal Empire started fracturing and declining after the death of Aurangzeb in 1707, the dominant power in the Indian subcontinent became the Maratha Empire, who were looked upon as the ceremonial rulers of the entire Indian subcontinent by outside powers and smaller rulers within India. By 1818 after the Marathas were overthrown, the governor-generals of the East India Company carried the title "Emperor of India". After the British Raj was formed in 1857, following the abolishment of the Company Raj, the monarchs assumed the same title until 1947, when India won Dominion status after its fight for independence.

From 1947 to 1950, the head of state under the Indian Independence Act 1947 was the of India, who was also the monarch of the United Kingdom and of the other Dominions of the British Commonwealth. The monarch was represented in India by a governor-general. India became a republic under the Constitution of 1950 and the monarch and governor-general were replaced by a ceremonial president.

== Emperor of Hindustan (1526–1540/1556–1857) ==
Used from the start of the empire after Babur's victory at Panipat till the end of the empire after Bahadur Shah Zafar's exile to Burma in 1857.

Legend:

Puppet emperor under Zulfiqar Khan
Puppet emperor under the Sayyids of Barha
Puppet emperor under the Scindias of Gwalior
Puppet emperor under the East India Company

No.	Portrait	Titular Name	Birth Name	Birth	Reign	Death	Grand Vizier
1		Babur بابر	Zahir ud-Din Muhammad ظهیر الدین محمد	14 February 1483 Andijan	21 April 1526 – 26 December 1530 (4 years, 8 months and 5 days)	26 December 1530 (aged 47) Agra	Mir Khalifa
2		Humayun همایوں	Nasir ud-Din Muhammad نصیر الدین محمد	6 March 1508 Kabul	26 December 1530 – 17 May 1540 (9 years, 4 months and 21 days) 22 February 1555 – 27 January 1556 (11 months and 5 days)	27 January 1556 (aged 47) Delhi	Mir Khalifa
2		Humayun همایوں	Nasir ud-Din Muhammad نصیر الدین محمد	6 March 1508 Kabul	26 December 1530 – 17 May 1540 (9 years, 4 months and 21 days) 22 February 1555 – 27 January 1556 (11 months and 5 days)	27 January 1556 (aged 47) Delhi	Qaracha Khan
3		Akbar I اکبر	Jalal ud-Din Muhammad جلال الدین محمد	15 October 1542 Umerkot	11 February 1556 – 27 October 1605 (49 years, 8 months and 16 days)	27 October 1605 (aged 63) Agra	Bairam Khan
3		Akbar I اکبر	Jalal ud-Din Muhammad جلال الدین محمد	15 October 1542 Umerkot	11 February 1556 – 27 October 1605 (49 years, 8 months and 16 days)	27 October 1605 (aged 63) Agra	Munim Khan
3		Akbar I اکبر	Jalal ud-Din Muhammad جلال الدین محمد	15 October 1542 Umerkot	11 February 1556 – 27 October 1605 (49 years, 8 months and 16 days)	27 October 1605 (aged 63) Agra	Ataga Khan
3		Akbar I اکبر	Jalal ud-Din Muhammad جلال الدین محمد	15 October 1542 Umerkot	11 February 1556 – 27 October 1605 (49 years, 8 months and 16 days)	27 October 1605 (aged 63) Agra	Munim Khan
3		Akbar I اکبر	Jalal ud-Din Muhammad جلال الدین محمد	15 October 1542 Umerkot	11 February 1556 – 27 October 1605 (49 years, 8 months and 16 days)	27 October 1605 (aged 63) Agra	Muzaffar Khan Turbati
3		Akbar I اکبر	Jalal ud-Din Muhammad جلال الدین محمد	15 October 1542 Umerkot	11 February 1556 – 27 October 1605 (49 years, 8 months and 16 days)	27 October 1605 (aged 63) Agra	Todar Mal
3		Akbar I اکبر	Jalal ud-Din Muhammad جلال الدین محمد	15 October 1542 Umerkot	11 February 1556 – 27 October 1605 (49 years, 8 months and 16 days)	27 October 1605 (aged 63) Agra	Abdul Rahim
3		Akbar I اکبر	Jalal ud-Din Muhammad جلال الدین محمد	15 October 1542 Umerkot	11 February 1556 – 27 October 1605 (49 years, 8 months and 16 days)	27 October 1605 (aged 63) Agra	Abu'l-Fazl
3		Akbar I اکبر	Jalal ud-Din Muhammad جلال الدین محمد	15 October 1542 Umerkot	11 February 1556 – 27 October 1605 (49 years, 8 months and 16 days)	27 October 1605 (aged 63) Agra	Mirza Koka
4		Jahangir جهانگیر	Nur ud-Din Muhammad نور الدین محمد	31 August 1569 Agra	3 November 1605 – 28 October 1627 (21 years, 11 months and 25 days)	28 October 1627 (aged 58) Bhimber	Sharif Khan
4		Jahangir جهانگیر	Nur ud-Din Muhammad نور الدین محمد	31 August 1569 Agra	3 November 1605 – 28 October 1627 (21 years, 11 months and 25 days)	28 October 1627 (aged 58) Bhimber	I'timad-ud-Daula
4		Jahangir جهانگیر	Nur ud-Din Muhammad نور الدین محمد	31 August 1569 Agra	3 November 1605 – 28 October 1627 (21 years, 11 months and 25 days)	28 October 1627 (aged 58) Bhimber	Asaf Khan
5		Shah Jahan I شاه جهان	Shihab ud-Din Muhammad شهاب الدین محمد	5 January 1592 Lahore	19 January 1628 – 31 July 1658 (30 years, 6 months and 12 days)	22 January 1666 (aged 74) Agra	Wazir Khan
5		Shah Jahan I شاه جهان	Shihab ud-Din Muhammad شهاب الدین محمد	5 January 1592 Lahore	19 January 1628 – 31 July 1658 (30 years, 6 months and 12 days)	22 January 1666 (aged 74) Agra	Azam Khan
5		Shah Jahan I شاه جهان	Shihab ud-Din Muhammad شهاب الدین محمد	5 January 1592 Lahore	19 January 1628 – 31 July 1658 (30 years, 6 months and 12 days)	22 January 1666 (aged 74) Agra	Afzal Khan
5		Shah Jahan I شاه جهان	Shihab ud-Din Muhammad شهاب الدین محمد	5 January 1592 Lahore	19 January 1628 – 31 July 1658 (30 years, 6 months and 12 days)	22 January 1666 (aged 74) Agra	Islam Khan
5		Shah Jahan I شاه جهان	Shihab ud-Din Muhammad شهاب الدین محمد	5 January 1592 Lahore	19 January 1628 – 31 July 1658 (30 years, 6 months and 12 days)	22 January 1666 (aged 74) Agra	Sa'dullah Khan
5		Shah Jahan I شاه جهان	Shihab ud-Din Muhammad شهاب الدین محمد	5 January 1592 Lahore	19 January 1628 – 31 July 1658 (30 years, 6 months and 12 days)	22 January 1666 (aged 74) Agra	Mu'azzam Khan
5		Shah Jahan I شاه جهان	Shihab ud-Din Muhammad شهاب الدین محمد	5 January 1592 Lahore	19 January 1628 – 31 July 1658 (30 years, 6 months and 12 days)	22 January 1666 (aged 74) Agra	Jafar Khan
6		Aurangzeb اورنگزیب Alamgir I عالمگیر	Muhi al-Din Muhammad محی الدین محمد	3 November 1618 Dahod, Gujarat	31 July 1658 – 3 March 1707 (48 years, 7 months and 3 days)	3 March 1707 (aged 88) Ahmednagar	Fazil Khan
6		Aurangzeb اورنگزیب Alamgir I عالمگیر	Muhi al-Din Muhammad محی الدین محمد	3 November 1618 Dahod, Gujarat	31 July 1658 – 3 March 1707 (48 years, 7 months and 3 days)	3 March 1707 (aged 88) Ahmednagar	Jafar Khan
6		Aurangzeb اورنگزیب Alamgir I عالمگیر	Muhi al-Din Muhammad محی الدین محمد	3 November 1618 Dahod, Gujarat	31 July 1658 – 3 March 1707 (48 years, 7 months and 3 days)	3 March 1707 (aged 88) Ahmednagar	Asad Khan
7		Azam Shah اعظم شاه	Qutb ud-Din Muhammad قطب الدين محمد	28 June 1653 Burhanpur	14 March – 20 June 1707 (3 months and 6 days)	20 June 1707 (aged 53) Agra	Asad Khan
8		Bahadur Shah I بهادر شاہ Shah Alam I شاه عالم اول	Mirza Muhammad Mu'azzam مرزا محمد معظم	14 October 1643 Burhanpur	19 June 1707 – 27 February 1712 (4 years, 8 months and 8 days)	27 February 1712 (aged 68) Lahore	Mun'im Khan
9		Jahandar Shah جهاندار شاہ	Muiz ud-Din Muhammad معز الدین محمد Puppet Emperor under Zulfiqar Khan	9 May 1661 Deccan	27 February 1712 – 11 February 1713 (11 months and 15 days)	12 February 1713 (aged 51) Delhi	Hidayatullah Khan
9		Jahandar Shah جهاندار شاہ	Muiz ud-Din Muhammad معز الدین محمد Puppet Emperor under Zulfiqar Khan	9 May 1661 Deccan	27 February 1712 – 11 February 1713 (11 months and 15 days)	12 February 1713 (aged 51) Delhi	Zulfiqar Khan
10		Farrukhsiyar فرخ سیر	Muin al-Din Muhammad معین الدین محمد Puppet emperor under the Sayyids of Barha	20 August 1685 Aurangabad	11 February 1713 – 28 February 1719 (6 years and 17 days)	19 April 1719 (aged 33) Delhi	Qutb-ul-Mulk
11		Rafi ud-Darajat رفیع الدرجات	Shams al-Din Muhammad شمس الدین محمد Puppet emperor under the Sayyids of Barha	1 December 1699	28 February 1719 – 6 June 1719 (3 months and 9 days)	6 June 1719 (aged 19) Agra	Qutb-ul-Mulk
12		Shah Jahan II شاہ جهان دوم	Rafi al-Din Muhammad رفع الدين محمد Puppet emperor under the Sayyids of Barha	5 January 1696	6 June 1719 – 17 September 1719 (3 months and 11 days)	18 September 1719 (aged 23) Agra	Qutb-ul-Mulk
13		Muhammad Shah محمد شاه	Nasir al-Din Muhammad نصیر الدین محمد Puppet emperor under the Sayyids of Barha	7 August 1702 Ghazni	27 September 1719 – 26 April 1748 (28 years, 6 months and 30 days)	26 April 1748 (aged 45) Delhi	Qutb-ul-Mulk
13		Muhammad Shah محمد شاه	Nasir al-Din Muhammad نصیر الدین محمد Puppet emperor under the Sayyids of Barha	7 August 1702 Ghazni	27 September 1719 – 26 April 1748 (28 years, 6 months and 30 days)	26 April 1748 (aged 45) Delhi	Amin Khan
13		Muhammad Shah محمد شاه	Nasir al-Din Muhammad نصیر الدین محمد Puppet emperor under the Sayyids of Barha	7 August 1702 Ghazni	27 September 1719 – 26 April 1748 (28 years, 6 months and 30 days)	26 April 1748 (aged 45) Delhi	Nizam-ul-Mulk
13		Muhammad Shah محمد شاه	Nasir al-Din Muhammad نصیر الدین محمد Puppet emperor under the Sayyids of Barha	7 August 1702 Ghazni	27 September 1719 – 26 April 1748 (28 years, 6 months and 30 days)	26 April 1748 (aged 45) Delhi	Roshan-ud-Daula
13		Muhammad Shah محمد شاه	Nasir al-Din Muhammad نصیر الدین محمد Puppet emperor under the Sayyids of Barha	7 August 1702 Ghazni	27 September 1719 – 26 April 1748 (28 years, 6 months and 30 days)	26 April 1748 (aged 45) Delhi	Itimad-ud-Daula
14		Ahmad Shah Bahadur احمد شاہ بهادر	Mujahid al-Din Muhammad مجاهد الدین محمد	23 December 1725 Delhi	29 April 1748 – 2 June 1754 (6 years, 1 month and 4 days)	1 January 1775 (aged 49) Delhi	Shuja-ud-Daula
14		Ahmad Shah Bahadur احمد شاہ بهادر	Mujahid al-Din Muhammad مجاهد الدین محمد	23 December 1725 Delhi	29 April 1748 – 2 June 1754 (6 years, 1 month and 4 days)	1 January 1775 (aged 49) Delhi	Intizam-ud-Daula
15		Alamgir II عالمگیر دوم	Aziz al-Din Muhammad عزیز اُلدین محمد	6 June 1699 Burhanpur	3 June 1754 – 29 November 1759 (5 years, 5 months and 26 days)	29 November 1759 (aged 60) Delhi	Imad-ul-Mulk
16		Shah Jahan III شاه جهان سوم	Muhi al-Millat محی الملت	1711	10 December 1759 – 10 October 1760 (10 months)	1772 (aged 60–61)	Imad-ul-Mulk
17		Shah Alam II شاه عالم دوم	Jalal al-Din Muhammad Ali Gauhar جلال الدین علی گوهر	25 June 1728 Delhi	10 October 1760 – 31 July 1788 (27 years, 9 months and 21 days)	19 November 1806 (aged 78) Delhi	Imad-ul-Mulk
17		Shah Alam II شاه عالم دوم	Jalal al-Din Muhammad Ali Gauhar جلال الدین علی گوهر	25 June 1728 Delhi	10 October 1760 – 31 July 1788 (27 years, 9 months and 21 days)	19 November 1806 (aged 78) Delhi	Shuja-ud-Daula
17		Shah Alam II شاه عالم دوم	Jalal al-Din Muhammad Ali Gauhar جلال الدین علی گوهر	25 June 1728 Delhi	10 October 1760 – 31 July 1788 (27 years, 9 months and 21 days)	19 November 1806 (aged 78) Delhi	Majad-ud-Daula Abdul Ahad Khan Kashmiri
17		Shah Alam II شاه عالم دوم	Jalal al-Din Muhammad Ali Gauhar جلال الدین علی گوهر	25 June 1728 Delhi	10 October 1760 – 31 July 1788 (27 years, 9 months and 21 days)	19 November 1806 (aged 78) Delhi	Mirza Najaf Khan
17		Shah Alam II شاه عالم دوم	Jalal al-Din Muhammad Ali Gauhar جلال الدین علی گوهر	25 June 1728 Delhi	10 October 1760 – 31 July 1788 (27 years, 9 months and 21 days)	19 November 1806 (aged 78) Delhi	Afrasiyab Khan
17		Shah Alam II شاه عالم دوم	Jalal al-Din Muhammad Ali Gauhar جلال الدین علی گوهر	25 June 1728 Delhi	10 October 1760 – 31 July 1788 (27 years, 9 months and 21 days)	19 November 1806 (aged 78) Delhi	Mahadaji Shinde
18		Shah Jahan IV جهان شاه چهارم	Bidar Bakht Mahmud Shah Bahadur Shah Jahan IV بیدار بخت محمود شاه بهادر جهان شاہ	1749 Delhi	31 July 1788 – 11 October 1788 (2 months and 11 days)	1790 (aged 40–41) Delhi	Mahadaji Shinde
17*		Shah Alam II شاه عالم دوم	Jalal al-Din Muhammad Ali Gauhar جلال الدین علی گوهر Puppet emperor under the Scindias of Gwalior	25 June 1728 Delhi	16 October 1788 – 19 November 1806 (18 years, 1 month and 3 days)	19 November 1806 (aged 78) Delhi	Mahadaji Shinde
17*		Shah Alam II شاه عالم دوم	Jalal al-Din Muhammad Ali Gauhar جلال الدین علی گوهر Puppet emperor under the Scindias of Gwalior	25 June 1728 Delhi	16 October 1788 – 19 November 1806 (18 years, 1 month and 3 days)	19 November 1806 (aged 78) Delhi	Daulat Rao Shinde
17*		Shah Alam II شاه عالم دوم	Jalal al-Din Muhammad Ali Gauhar جلال الدین علی گوهر Puppet emperor under the Scindias of Gwalior	25 June 1728 Delhi	16 October 1788 – 19 November 1806 (18 years, 1 month and 3 days)	19 November 1806 (aged 78) Delhi	Position Dissolved (Note: In 1803, the British East India Company defeated the Marathas at the Battle of Delhi. The imperial court in Delhi ceased to function as an independent government,making the position of grand vizier obsolete.)
19		Akbar Shah II اکبر شاه دوم	Muin al-Din Muhammad میرزا اکبر Puppet emperor under the East India Company	22 April 1760 Mukundpur	19 November 1806 – 28 September 1837 (30 years, 10 months and 9 days)	28 September 1837 (aged 77) Delhi	Position Dissolved
20		Bahadur Shah II Zafar بهادر شاه ظفر	Abu Zafar Siraj al-Din Muhammad ابو ظفر سراج اُلدین محمد	24 October 1775 Delhi	28 September 1837 – 21 September 1857 (19 years, 11 months and 24 days)	7 November 1862 (aged 87) Rangoon	Position Dissolved

== Sultan of Hindustan (1540–1556) ==
No.	Picture	Name	Birth date	Death date	Reign	Notes
1		Sher Shah Suri (شیر شاہ سوری)	1472 or 1486	22 May 1545	17 May 1540 — 22 May 1545	
2		Islam Shah Suri (اسلام شاہ سوری)	1507	22 November 1554	26 May 1545 — 22 November 1554	Son of Sher Shah Suri.
3	N/A	Firuz Shah Suri (فیروز شاہ سوری)	4 May 1542	22 November – December 1554	December 1554	Son of Islam Shah Suri.
4	N/A	Muhammad Adil Shah (محمد عادل شاہ)	unknown	1557	December 1554 – January 1555 — 1555	Son-in-law of Sher Shah Suri.
5	N/A	Ibrahim Shah Suri (ابراہیم شاہ سوری)	unknown	1567/1568	January – February 1555	Brothers-in-law of Sher Shah Suri.
6	Sikandar_Shah_Suri,_in_front_of_Akbar,_25_July_1557.	Sikandar Shah Suri (سکندر شاہ سوری)	unknown	1559	February 1555 — 22 June 1555	Brothers-in-law of Sher Shah Suri.
7	N/A	Adil Shah Suri (عادل شاہ سوری)	unknown	April 1557	22 June 1555 — 1556	Brother of Sikandar Shah Suri.

== Chhatrapati of India (1674–1818) ==
No.	Portrait	Titular Name	Birth Name	Reign
1		Shivaji शिवाजी	Shivaji Shahajiraje Bhonsle शिवाजी शहाजीराजे भोसले	6 June 1674 – 3 April 1680 (5 years, 10 months and 27 days)
2		Sambhaji संभाजी	Sambhaji Shivajiraje Bhonsle संभाजी शिवाजीराजे भोंसले	16 January 1681 – 11 March 1689 (8 years, 1 month and 23 days)
3		Rajaram I राजाराम	Ramaraja Fateh Shah Bhonsle रामराजा फतेह शाह भोंसले	11 March 1689 – 3 March 1700 (10 years, 11 months and 20 days)
4		Shivaji II शिवाजी द्वितीय	Shivaji Shah Fateh Ramaraja Bhonsle शिवाजी शाह फतेह रामराजा भोंसले	3 March 1700 – 12 January 1708 (7 years, 10 months and 9 days)
5		Shahu I शाहू	Shahu Sambhaji Rajshah Bhonsle शाहू संभाजी राजशाह भोंसले	12 January 1708 – 15 December 1749 (41 years, 11 months and 3 days)
6		Rajaram II राजाराम द्वितीय	Ramaraja Shahu Khan Bhonsle रामराजा शाहू खान भोंसले	15 December 1749 – 11 December 1777 (27 years, 11 months and 26 days)
7		Shahu II शाहू द्वितीय	Shahu Ramaraja Khan Bhonsle शाहू रामराजा खान भोंसले	11 December 1777 – 3 May 1808 (30 years, 4 months and 22 days)
8		Pratap Singh प्रतापसिंह	Fateh Singh Pratap Khan Bhonsle फ़तेह सिंह प्रताप खान भोंसले	3 May 1808 – 3 June 1818 (10 years and 29 days)

== Emperor of India (1876–1947) ==
After the Indian Rebellion of 1857, power was transferred from the British East India Company to the British Empire. The King/Queen of the United Kingdom also adopted the additional title of Emperor/Empress of India.

Portrait	Name	Reign	Consort	Imperial Durbar	Royal House
	Victoria	1 May 1876 – 22 January 1901	None (Note: Victoria's husband Prince Albert died on 14 December 1861.)	1 January 1877 (represented by Lord Lytton)	Hanover
	Edward VII	22 January 1901 – 6 May 1910	Alexandra of Denmark	1 January 1903 (represented by Lord Curzon)	Saxe-Coburg and Gotha
	George V	6 May 1910 – 20 January 1936	Mary of Teck	12 December 1911	Saxe-Coburg and Gotha (1910–1917) Windsor (1917–1936)
	Edward VIII	20 January 1936 – 11 December 1936	None	None (Note: Edward VIII abdicated after less than one year of reign.)	Windsor
	George VI	11 December 1936 – 15 August 1947	Elizabeth Bowes-Lyon	None (Note: A durbar was deemed expensive and impractical due to poverty and demands for independence.)	Windsor

=== Governor-General ===
The Governor-General was the representative of the British Monarch in India and exercised most of the powers of the Monarch. The Governor-General was appointed for an indefinite term, serving at the pleasure of the Monarch.

Portrait	Governor-General or Viceroy (Lifespan)	Term of office		Secretary of State
Appointed by Queen Victoria (1837-1901)
	Charles Canning, 2nd Viscount Canning (Note: Created Earl Canning 1859.) (1812–1862)	1 November 1858	21 March 1862	Lord Stanley; Charles Wood
	James Bruce, 8th Earl of Elgin (1811–1863)	21 March 1862	20 November 1863	Charles Wood
	Robert Napier (acting) (1810–1890)	21 November 1863	2 December 1863	Charles Wood
	William Denison (acting) (1804–1871)	2 December 1863	12 January 1864	Charles Wood
	Sir John Lawrence, 1st Baronet (1811–1879)	12 January 1864	12 January 1869	Charles Wood; George Robinson, Earl de Grey; Viscount Cranborne; Stafford Northcote; George Campbell, 8th Duke of Argyll
	Richard Bourke, 6th Earl of Mayo (1822–1872)	12 January 1869	8 February 1872	George Campbell, 8th Duke of Argyll
	John Strachey (acting) (1823–1907)	9 February 1872	23 February 1872	George Campbell, 8th Duke of Argyll
	Francis Napier, 10th Lord Napier (acting) (1819–1898)	24 February 1872	3 May 1872	George Campbell, 8th Duke of Argyll
	Thomas Baring, 2nd Baron Northbrook (1826–1904)	3 May 1872	12 April 1876	George Campbell, 8th Duke of Argyll; Robert Gascoyne-Cecil, 3rd Marquess of Salisbury
	Robert Bulwer-Lytton, 1st Earl of Lytton (1831–1891)	12 April 1876	8 June 1880	Robert Gascoyne-Cecil, 3rd Marquess of Salisbury; Gathorne Gathorne-Hardy, Viscount Cranbrook; Marquess of Hartington
	George Robinson, 1st Marquess of Ripon (1827–1909)	8 June 1880	13 December 1884	Marquess of Hartington; John Wodehouse, 1st Earl of Kimberley
	Frederick Hamilton-Temple-Blackwood, 1st Earl of Dufferin (1826–1902)	13 December 1884	10 December 1888	John Wodehouse, 1st Earl of Kimberley; Lord Randolph Churchill; John Wodehouse, 1st Earl of Kimberley; R. A. Cross, 1st Viscount Cross
	Henry Petty-Fitzmaurice, 5th Marquess of Lansdowne (1845–1927)	10 December 1888	21 January 1894	R. A. Cross, 1st Viscount Cross; John Wodehouse, 1st Earl of Kimberley; Henry Fowler
	Victor Bruce, 9th Earl of Elgin (1849–1917)	21 January 1894	6 January 1899	Henry Fowler; Lord George Hamilton
	George Curzon, 1st Baron Curzon of Kedleston (1859–1925)	6 January 1899	18 November 1905	Lord George Hamilton; William St John Brodrick
Appointed by Edward VII (1901–1910)
	Gilbert Elliot-Murray-Kynynmound, 4th Earl of Minto (1845–1914)	18 November 1905	23 November 1910	William St John Brodrick; John Morley; Robert Crewe-Milnes, Earl of Crewe
Appointed by George V (1910–1936)
	Charles Hardinge, 1st Baron Hardinge of Penshurst (1858–1944)	23 November 1910	4 April 1916	Robert Crewe-Milnes, Earl of Crewe; John Morley, 1st Viscount Morley of Blackburn; Robert Crewe-Milnes, 1st Marquess of Crewe; Austen Chamberlain
	Frederic Thesiger, 1st Viscount Chelmsford (1868–1933)	4 April 1916	2 April 1921	Austen Chamberlain; Edwin Montagu
	Rufus Isaacs, 1st Marquess of Reading (1860–1935)	2 April 1921	3 April 1926	Edwin Montagu; William Peel, Viscount Peel; Sydney Olivier, 1st Baron Olivier; F. E. Smith, 1st Earl of Birkenhead
	E. F. L. Wood, 1st Baron Irwin (1881–1959)	3 April 1926	18 April 1931	F. E. Smith, 1st Earl of Birkenhead; William Peel, Viscount Peel
	George Goschen, 2nd Viscount Goschen (acting) (1866–1952)	29 June 1929	11 November 1929	William Peel, Viscount Peel, William Wedgwood Benn
	Freeman Freeman-Thomas, 1st Earl of Willingdon (1866–1941)	18 April 1931	18 April 1936	William Wedgwood Benn; Samuel Hoare; Lawrence Dundas, 2nd Marquess of Zetland
Appointed by Edward VIII (1936)
	Victor Hope, 2nd Marquess of Linlithgow (1887–1952)	18 April 1936	1 October 1943	Lawrence Dundas, 2nd Marquess of Zetland; Leo Amery
Appointed by George VI (1936–1947) (as Emperor of India)
	Archibald Wavell, 1st Viscount Wavell (1883–1950)	1 October 1943	21 February 1947	Leo Amery; Frederick Pethick-Lawrence, 1st Baron Pethick-Lawrence
	Louis Mountbatten, 1st Viscount Mountbatten of Burma (1900–1979)	21 February 1947	15 August 1947	Frederick Pethick-Lawrence, 1st Baron Pethick-Lawrence; William Hare, 5th Earl of Listowel

== Monarch of the Dominion of India (1947–1950) ==
Monarchy of India
- Emblem of the Dominion of India (1947–1950)

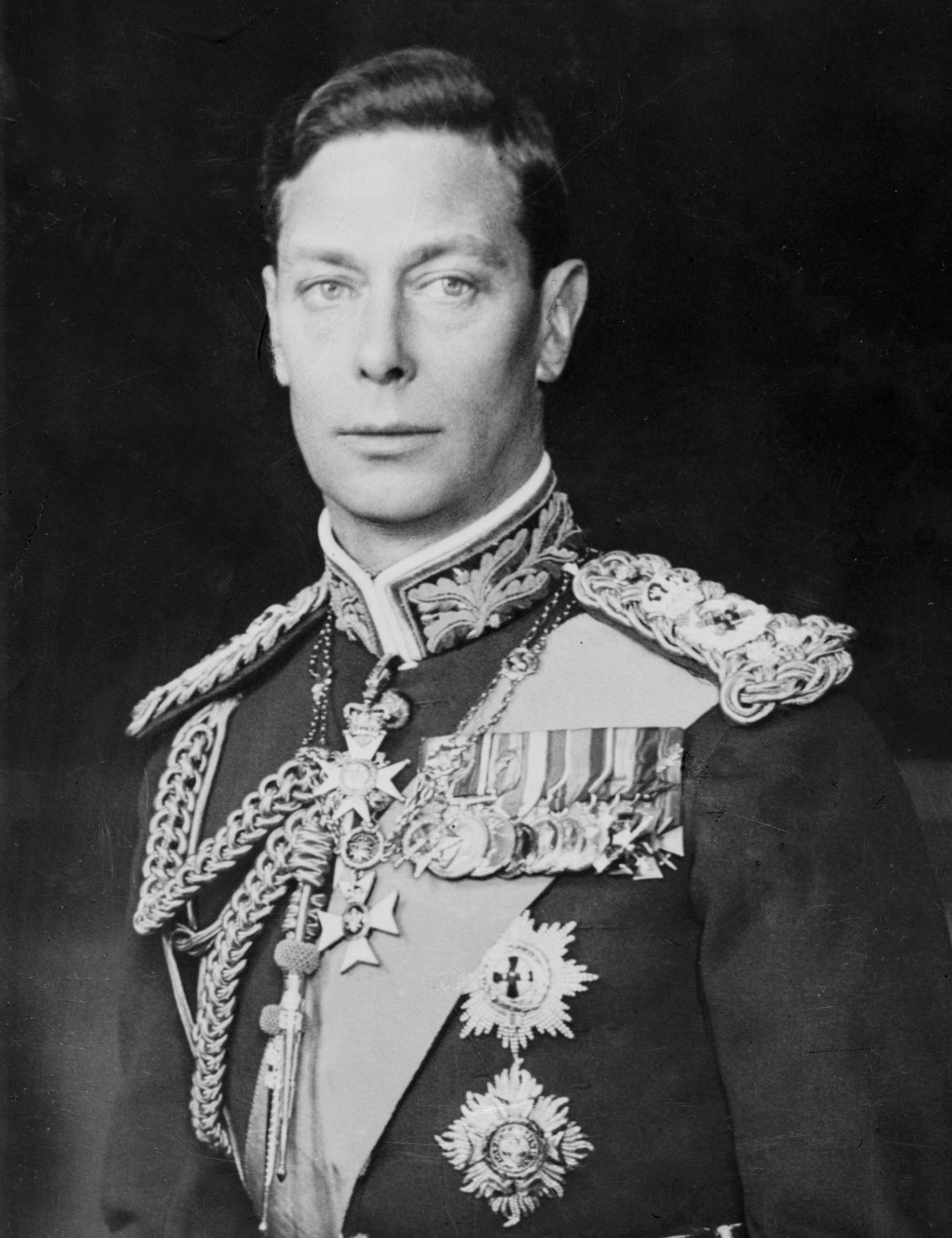
- George VI; 15 August 1947 – 26 January 1950

Details
- Style: His Majesty
- First monarch: George VI
- Last monarch: George VI
- Formed: 15 August 1947
- Abolished: 26 January 1950

Head of State during the Dominion of India. The succession to the throne was the same as the succession to the British throne.

No.	Portrait	Monarch (Birth–Death)	Reign		Royal House	Prime Minister	Governor General
No.	Portrait	Monarch (Birth–Death)	Reign start	Reign end	Royal House	Prime Minister	Governor General
1		George VI (1895–1952)	15 August 1947	26 January 1950	Windsor	Nehru	Mountbatten (1947–1948)
1		George VI (1895–1952)	15 August 1947	26 January 1950	Windsor	Nehru	Rajagopalachari (1948–1950)

=== Governor-General ===
Following independence in 1947, the Governor-General was appointed solely on the advice of the Cabinet of India without the involvement of the British government.

No.	Portrait	Governor-General (Birth–Death)	Tenure		Prime Minister
No.	Portrait	Governor-General (Birth–Death)	Took office	Left office	Prime Minister
Appointed by George VI (1947–1950) (as King of India)
1		The Rt. Hon. The Earl Mountbatten of Burma (1900–1979)	15 August 1947	21 June 1948	Jawaharlal Nehru
2		Chakravarti Rajagopalachari (1878–1972)	21 June 1948	26 January 1950	Jawaharlal Nehru

== President of India (1950–present) ==
Under the Constitution of the Republic of India, the president replaced the monarch as head of state. The president is elected by Electoral College of India for a five-year term. In the event of a vacancy, the vice president serves as acting president.

Status

Denotes Vice-President acting as President

Portrait	President (Birth–Death)	Tenure		Home State	Political affiliation (at time of appointment)	Vice President	Prime Minister
Portrait	President (Birth–Death)	Took office	Left office	Home State	Political affiliation (at time of appointment)	Vice President	Prime Minister
	Rajendra Prasad (1884–1963)	26 January 1950	13 May 1962	Bihar	Indian National Congress	Sarvepalli Radhakrishnan	Jawaharlal Nehru
	Sir Sarvepalli Radhakrishnan (1888–1975)	13 May 1962	13 May 1967	Tamil Nadu	Independent	Zakir Husain	Jawaharlal Nehru
	Sir Sarvepalli Radhakrishnan (1888–1975)	13 May 1962	13 May 1967	Tamil Nadu	Independent	Zakir Husain	Gulzarilal Nanda
	Sir Sarvepalli Radhakrishnan (1888–1975)	13 May 1962	13 May 1967	Tamil Nadu	Independent	Zakir Husain	Lal Bahadur Shastri
	Sir Sarvepalli Radhakrishnan (1888–1975)	13 May 1962	13 May 1967	Tamil Nadu	Independent	Zakir Husain	Gulzarilal Nanda
	Sir Sarvepalli Radhakrishnan (1888–1975)	13 May 1962	13 May 1967	Tamil Nadu	Independent	Zakir Husain	Indira Gandhi
	Zakir Husain (1897–1969)	13 May 1967	3 May 1969 (died in office.)	Andhra Pradesh	Independent	V. V. Giri	Indira Gandhi
	V. V. Giri (1894–1980)	3 May 1969	20 July 1969	Andhra Pradesh	Independent	Gopal Swarup Pathak	Indira Gandhi
	Mohammad Hidayatullah (1905–1992)	20 July 1969	24 August 1969	Madhya Pradesh		Gopal Swarup Pathak	Indira Gandhi
	V. V. Giri (1894–1980)	24 August 1969	24 August 1974	Andhra Pradesh	Independent	Gopal Swarup Pathak	Indira Gandhi
	Fakhruddin Ali Ahmed (1905–1977)	24 August 1974	11 February 1977 (died in office.)	Assam	Indian National Congress	Gopal Swarup Pathak	Indira Gandhi
	Fakhruddin Ali Ahmed (1905–1977)	24 August 1974	11 February 1977 (died in office.)	Assam	B. D. Jatti		Indira Gandhi
	Basappa Danappa Jatti (1912–2002)	11 February 1977	25 July 1977	Karnataka	B. D. Jatti	Indian National Congress	Indira Gandhi
	Basappa Danappa Jatti (1912–2002)	11 February 1977	25 July 1977	Karnataka	B. D. Jatti	Indian National Congress	Morarji Desai
	Neelam Sanjiva Reddy (1913–1996)	25 July 1977	25 July 1982	Andhra Pradesh	B. D. Jatti	Janata Party	Morarji Desai
	Neelam Sanjiva Reddy (1913–1996)	25 July 1977	25 July 1982	Andhra Pradesh	Mohammad Hidayatullah	Janata Party	Morarji Desai
	Neelam Sanjiva Reddy (1913–1996)	25 July 1977	25 July 1982	Andhra Pradesh	Mohammad Hidayatullah	Janata Party	Charan Singh
	Neelam Sanjiva Reddy (1913–1996)	25 July 1977	25 July 1982	Andhra Pradesh	Mohammad Hidayatullah	Janata Party	Indira Gandhi
	Giani Zail Singh (1916–1994)	25 July 1982	25 July 1987	Punjab	Mohammad Hidayatullah	Indian National Congress	Indira Gandhi
	Giani Zail Singh (1916–1994)	25 July 1982	25 July 1987	Punjab	Ramaswamy Venkataraman	Indian National Congress	Indira Gandhi
	Giani Zail Singh (1916–1994)	25 July 1982	25 July 1987	Punjab	Ramaswamy Venkataraman	Indian National Congress	Rajiv Gandhi
	Ramaswamy Venkataraman (1910–2009)	25 July 1987	25 July 1992	Tamil Nadu	Indian National Congress	Shankar Dayal Sharma	Rajiv Gandhi
	Ramaswamy Venkataraman (1910–2009)	25 July 1987	25 July 1992	Tamil Nadu	Indian National Congress	Shankar Dayal Sharma	V. P. Singh
	Ramaswamy Venkataraman (1910–2009)	25 July 1987	25 July 1992	Tamil Nadu	Indian National Congress	Shankar Dayal Sharma	Chandra Shekhar
	Ramaswamy Venkataraman (1910–2009)	25 July 1987	25 July 1992	Tamil Nadu	Indian National Congress	Shankar Dayal Sharma	P. V. Narasimha Rao
	Shankar Dayal Sharma (1918–1999)	25 July 1992	25 July 1997	Madhya Pradesh	Indian National Congress	K. R. Narayanan	P. V. Narasimha Rao
	Shankar Dayal Sharma (1918–1999)	25 July 1992	25 July 1997	Madhya Pradesh	Indian National Congress	K. R. Narayanan	Atal Bihari Vajpayee
	Shankar Dayal Sharma (1918–1999)	25 July 1992	25 July 1997	Madhya Pradesh	Indian National Congress	K. R. Narayanan	H. D. Deve Gowda
	Shankar Dayal Sharma (1918–1999)	25 July 1992	25 July 1997	Madhya Pradesh	Indian National Congress	K. R. Narayanan	Inder Kumar Gujral
	K. R. Narayanan (1920–2005)	25 July 1997	25 July 2002	Kerala	Indian National Congress	Krishan Kant	Inder Kumar Gujral
	K. R. Narayanan (1920–2005)	25 July 1997	25 July 2002	Kerala	Indian National Congress	Krishan Kant	Atal Bihari Vajpayee
	A. P. J. Abdul Kalam (1931–2015)	25 July 2002	25 July 2007	Tamil Nadu	Independent	Krishan Kant	Atal Bihari Vajpayee
	A. P. J. Abdul Kalam (1931–2015)	25 July 2002	25 July 2007	Tamil Nadu	Independent	Bhairon Singh Shekhawat	Atal Bihari Vajpayee
	A. P. J. Abdul Kalam (1931–2015)	25 July 2002	25 July 2007	Tamil Nadu	Independent	Bhairon Singh Shekhawat	Manmohan Singh
	Pratibha Patil (born 1934)	25 July 2007	25 July 2012	Maharashtra	Indian National Congress	Mohammad Hamid Ansari	Manmohan Singh
	Pranab Mukherjee (1935–2020)	25 July 2012	25 July 2017	West Bengal	Indian National Congress	Mohammad Hamid Ansari	Manmohan Singh
	Pranab Mukherjee (1935–2020)	25 July 2012	25 July 2017	West Bengal	Indian National Congress	Mohammad Hamid Ansari	Narendra Modi
	Ram Nath Kovind (born 1945)	25 July 2017	25 July 2022	Bihar	Bharatiya Janata Party	Venkaiah Naidu	Narendra Modi
	Droupadi Murmu (born 1958)	25 July 2022	Incumbent	Odisha	Bharatiya Janata Party	Venkaiah Naidu	Narendra Modi
	Droupadi Murmu (born 1958)	25 July 2022	Incumbent	Odisha	Bharatiya Janata Party	Jagdeep Dhankhar	Narendra Modi
	Droupadi Murmu (born 1958)	25 July 2022	Incumbent	Odisha	Bharatiya Janata Party	C. P. Radhakrishnan	Narendra Modi

== Standards ==
Governor-General's Standard (1947–1950)

Presidential Standard (1950–1971)
