= Dar-ul-Uloom Azizia, Bhera =

Islamic seminary in Bhera, Pakistan, founded in 1841

Dar-ul-Uloom Azizia
- دارالعلوم عزیزیہ
- Type: Islamic seminary (madrasa)
- Established: 1841
- Founder: Bugvi family
- Affiliations: Sunni Islam
- Location: Bhera, Punjab, Pakistan

Dar-ul-Uloom Azizia (Urdu: دارالعلوم عزیزیہ) is an Islamic seminary situated at the Sher Shah Suri Mosque in Bhera, Sargodha District, Pakistan. It was established by the Bugvi family in 1841 and is one of the oldest and running Islamic schools in Sargodha. There has been dedicated institutional research on its role in disseminating religious knowledge in Punjab during the 19th and 20th centuries.

== History ==
The seminary was established in 1841 at the historic Sher Shah Suri Mosque, which was constructed in 1540 AD during the Sur era.The Bugvi family, the guardians of the mosque founded the institution to teach the Quran, Hadith, and the religious sciences.

In 1858, the mosque was rebuilt by Qazi Ahmed-ud-din Bugvi, who added two halls dedicated to Quran and Hadith study and adjacent boarding houses for students of the seminary; further restoration was carried out by Qazi Zahoor Ahmed Bugvi in 1926.

The institution had two significant developmental stages, from 1929-1975, as studied in the Iḥyāʾ al-ʿUlūm journal published by the Department of Quran and Sunnah at the University of Karachi.

== Activities ==
In addition to its basic function of religious education, Dar-ul-Uloom Azizia has historically been known to be linked with:

- The Bugvia Library, an institutional reference library reported to be approximately two centuries old;
- The monthly Urdu magazine Shams-ul-Islam, founded in 1925;
- The Bugvia Marryland Girls Model High School, Bhera, a girls' high school established by the family;
- free annual eye camps held since 1978;
- a free dispensary serving local patients.

== Leadership ==
The institution is in the charge of Sahibzada Abrar Ahmed Bugvi, who also serves as the Khatib (sermon-giver) of the Sher Shah Suri Mosque.

== Connection to the Khilafat Movement ==
Maulana Zahoor Ahmed Bugvi, a member of a family active in the Khilafat Movement of the early 1920s, was associated with the seminary; he was arrested at Sargodha on 15 March 1922 and imprisoned for one and a half years for his role in organizing Khilafat processions across Sargodha district.

== See also ==
- Sher Shah Suri Mosque
- Bhera
- Bugvi family
