= Battle of Sirhind (1555) =

1555 battle between the Mughal and Sur empires

- Part of Delhi
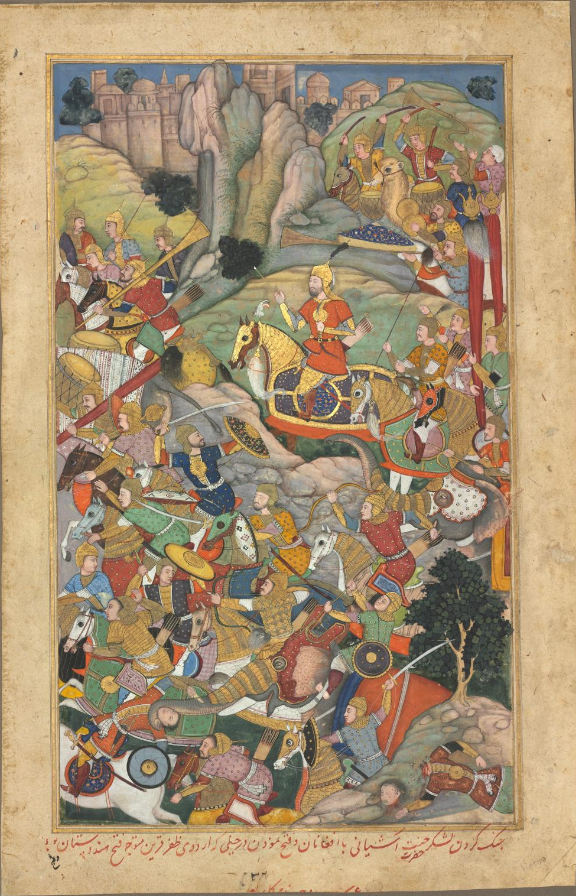
Date	22 June 1555
Location	Sirhind
Result	Mughal victory
Territorial changes	Re-establishment of the Mughal Empire

Belligerents
Mughal Empire	Suri Empire

Commanders and leaders
Humayun; Bairam Khan; Khazir khan Suri	Sikandar Shah Suri

Strength
50,000	80,000

The Battle of Sirhind was fought between the Mughal Empire and the Sur Empire in 1555.

== Background ==
Humayun had been in exile for 15 years after being forced to flee by Sher Shah Suri, a Pashtun commander who had taken control of the Mughal territories. During his exile, Humayun spent time in Persia where he was exposed to Persian high culture and military technology. This exposure gave him valuable insight into administration, politics, and warfare, which would later serve him well in his quest to reclaim his empire. After defeating his brothers in Afghanistan and Uzbekistan, Humayun was able to solidify his hold over the region and return to India, where he successfully recaptured Babur's former capital of Delhi and reestablished the Mughal Empire.

After the death of Islam Shah Suri, the Suri Empire had erupted in a civil war where various contenders to the throne fought each other for supremacy. Sikandar Shah Suri was occupied with his struggle against Ibrahim Shah Suri when Humayun mobilized an army from Kabul. He captured Rohtas Fort and Lahore in February 1555. Another detachment of his forces captured Dipalpur, Gurdaspur and Jalandhar. Their advanced division proceeded towards Sirhind. Sikandar sent a force of 30,000 to intercept them but they were defeated by the Mughal Army in the Battle of Machhiwara and Sirhind was occupied by the Mughals.

== Battle ==
Sikandar led an army of 80,000 and met the Mughals in battle at Sirhind on 22 June 1555. Humayun and Bairam Khan carried out a daring raid in a rainstorm like Sher Shah Suri had done at the Battle of Chausa to defeat Humayun. Sikander was defeated by the Mughal Army and was compelled to retreat to the Sivalik Hills in northeastern Punjab. The victorious Mughals marched to Delhi, occupied it and reestablished their empire in India.

== See also ==
- Battles of Sirhind (disambiguation)
