= Siege of Mankot (1557) =

1557 siege during the Mughal reconquest

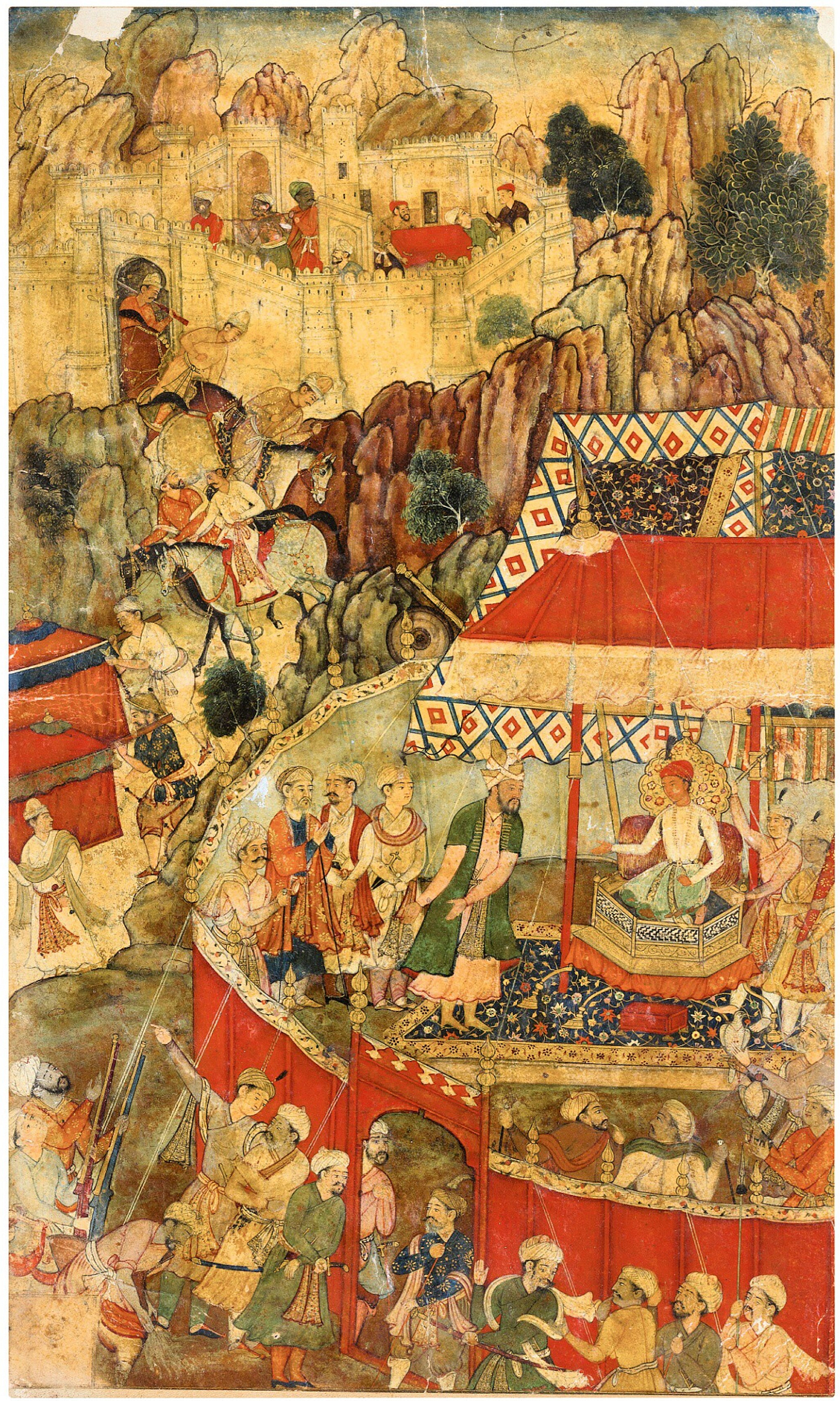
- Painting of Afghan troops surrendering to Mughal forces at the Siege of Mankot. Akbarnama (1590-95)
Date	January – 25 July 1557
Location	Mankot

Belligerents
Mughal Empire	Sur loyalists

Commanders and leaders
Bairam Khan; Akbar	Sikandar Shah Suri (surrendered)

The siege of Mankot (1557) was a major confrontation between the Sur Empire and the Mughal Empire led by a young Akbar.

It was one of the last events of the Mughal reconquest, and the first major military encounter of the young Akbar, who was still under the regency of Bairam Khan. In 1557, Sikandar Shah Suri had taken refuge in the castle of Mankot with his troops. The Afghan garrison resisted during 6 months using artillery and matchlocks, but had to surrender when food ran out.

Sikandar surrendered to the Mughal forces led by Bairam Khan on 25 July 1557. Sikandar was pardoned and entered the service of emperor Akbar, but soon fell out of favor.

Illustrations of the siege were included in several editions of the Akbarnama.
