= Firuz Shah Suri =

Sultan of the Suri Empire (1542 – 1554)

Sultan of Hindustan
- Reign: 22–25 November 1554
- Predecessor: Islam Shah Suri
- Successor: Muhammad Shah Adil
- Born: 4 May 1542
- Died: December 1554 (aged 12)
- House: Sur
- Dynasty: Sur Empire
- Father: Islam Shah Suri
- Religion: Sunni Islam

Firuz Shah Suri (4 May 1542 – December 1554) was Sultan of Hindustan from 22 November 1554 until his assassination in 1554. He was the son of Islam Shah Suri and succeeded him in 1554 when he was twelve years old. Firuz Shah Suri was assassinated within days of his coronation by Sher Shah Suri's nephew Muhammad Mubariz Khan, who later ruled as Muhammad Shah Adil Suri.

== See also ==
- History of Bengal
- History of India
- Sur Empire

Preceded by Islam Shah Suri	Shah of Delhi; 1554	Succeeded by Muhammad Shah Adil
