= Battles of Sirhind =

The following battles were fought in Sirhind.

- Battle of Sirhind (1555)
- Battle of Chappar Chiri, 1710
- Siege of Sirhind, 1710
- Sack of Sirhind (1748)
- Siege of Sirhind 1758
- Battle of Harnaulgarh, 1762
- Battle of Sirhind (1764)
