= Sur Empire =

Empire in Northern India between 1538/1540 and 1556

- 1538–1555
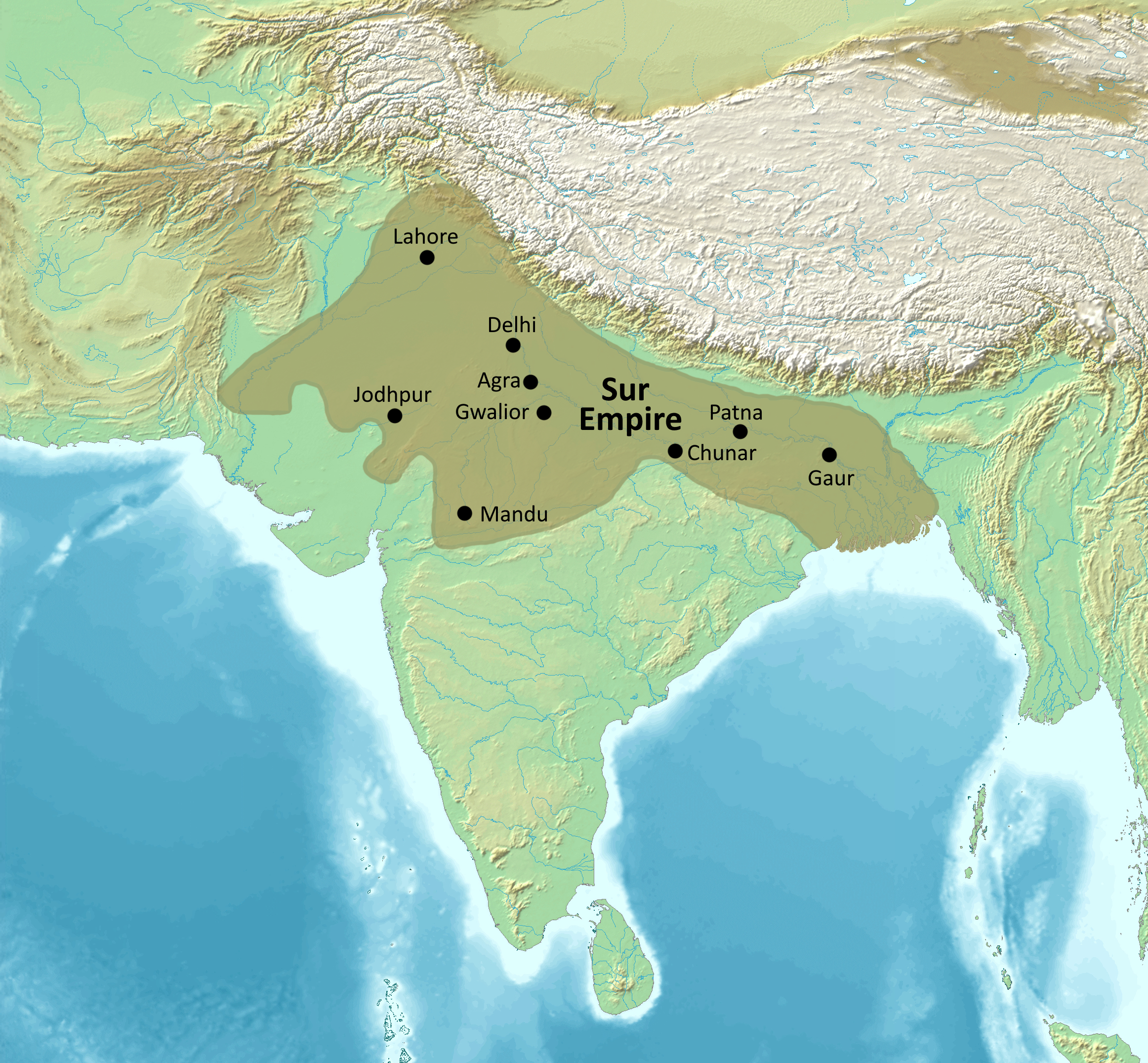
- Map of the Sur Empire at its greatest extent under Sher Shah Suri (1538/1540–1545)
- Status: Empire
- Capital: Sasaram; Delhi
- Official languages: Hindavi
- Common languages: Persian; Bengali; Bhojpuri
- Religion: Sunni Islam
- Government: Absolute monarchy
- Sultan
  - 1538/1540–1545: Sher Shah Suri (first)
  - 1555–1556: Adil Shah Suri (last)
- History
  - Siege of Gauda: 6 April 1538
  - Battle of Kannauj: 17 May 1540
  - Battle of Sirhind: 22 June 1555
Preceded by
Mughal Empire
Bengal Sultanate
Portuguese Empire
Malwa Sultanate
Langah Sultanate
Rajputana
Succeeded by
Mughal Empire
Bengal Sultanate
Malwa Sultanate

The Sur Empire was an empire ruled by the Afghan-origin Sur dynasty in northern India for nearly 16 or 18 years, between 1538/1540 and 1556, with Sasaram (in modern-day Bihar) serving as its capital. It was founded by Sher Shah Suri.

The Sur dynasty held control of nearly all the then-territories of Mughal Empire along the Indo-Gangetic Plain, from eastern Balochistan in the west of Indus River to modern-day Rakhine, Myanmar in the east. Even as Sher Shah Suri consolidated his power over northern India, eastern India was still considered to be the seat of Sur power, evident by the fact that 8 of the 16 silver mint cities Sher Shah established were in the region between Chunar and Fathabad.

== Reign of Sher Shah Suri ==
=== War with the Bengal Sultanate and Mughal Empire (1537–1540) ===
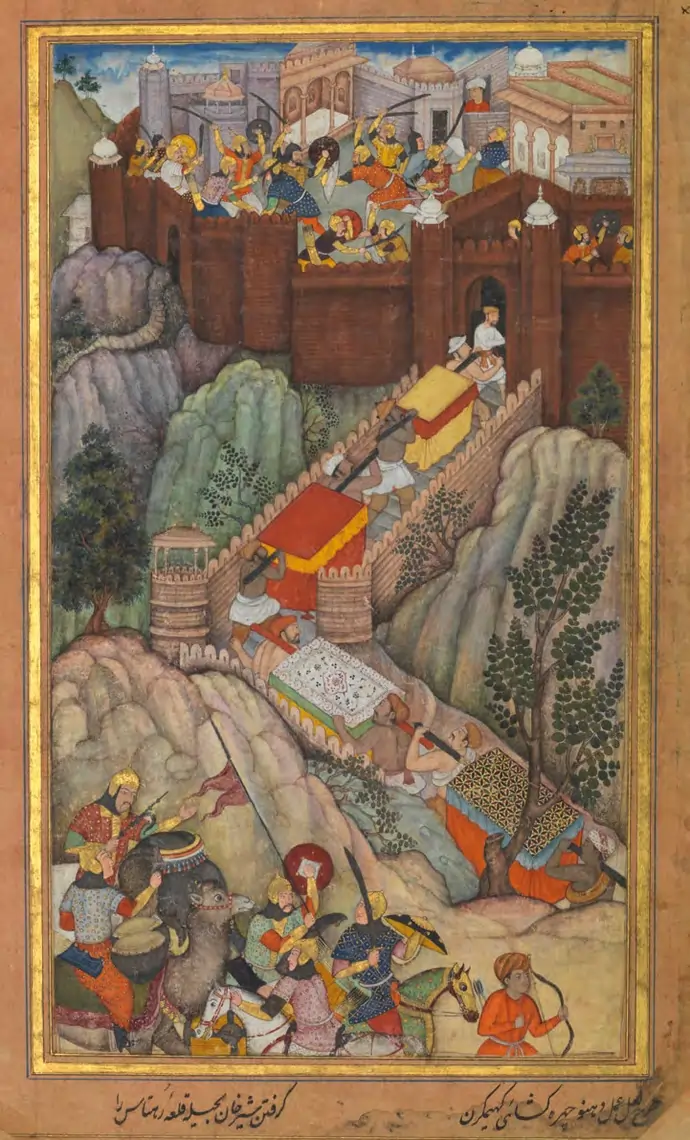
Depiction of Sher Shah's capture of Rohtasgarh fort through Stratagem

Sher Shah Suri's relentless campaigns on the Bengal Sultanate prompted its ruler to request aid from Humayun, who in turn mobilized a Mughal army in July 1537, and advanced to Chunar. He reached the fort in November 1537 and laid siege to it. The siege of the fort at Chumar would last over six months until it finally fell despite the attempts from Rumi Khan to make quick work of the city. Sher Shah then led a second invasion into Bengal, and besieged Gauda. Gauda fell to the Afghan forces in April 1538. With the fort of Rohtasgarh also falling under his control in March 1538, which he used as a place to situate Afghan families and the loot he had obtained during the war, also transferring the loot he obtained from Gaur to Rohtasgarh. With this victory, Sher Shah held his first coronation. Following the fall of Gaur, Sher Shah offered favourable peace terms to Humayun, offering 10,000,000 dinars, and that he would surrender Bihar in exchange for control of Bengal. Humayun did not wish to leave Bengal in the hands of a hostile state, especially with its rich resources, as well as the contributing factor that Ghiyasuddin Mahmud Shah, wounded, entered the camp of Humayun and requested the continuation of war against Sher Shah. Ghiyasuddin would die from his wounds not long after.

Following this, Humayun began his march to Bengal against Sher Khan, however the march of the Mughal army would be overwhelmed from poor weather conditions, with rains causing the loss of his baggage between Patna and Monghyr. Humayun eventually reached Gauda and seized it without any opposition on 8 September 1538. However, the city was abandoned by the Afghans, with no loot as they had stripped the treasury. Humayun remained at Gaur for months, stuck there due to the weather, however he restored order into the city. However, as this was happening, Sher Khan drove deep into his territory, seizing Bihar and Varanasi, while also recovering control over Chunar, and laying siege to Jaunpur, with other detachments of the Afghan army extending as far as Kannauj. As a result, Humayun was effectively stranded at Gauda with no communication lines. After learning of disturbances at Agra, Humayun rushed to settle for peace with Sher Khan, which was concluded. Humayun crossed the Karmanasa River, where he could easily be attacked by the Afghans. Sher Khan, seeing the fragile state of the Mughal army, attacked the Mughal army led by Humayun at the Battle of Chausa. The Afghans descended on the Mughals and caught them off guard, and resulted in the complete rout of the Mughals. Humayun barely escaped with his life, and the Mughals suffered over 7,000 dead, with many prominent noblemen dead.

Following his defeat, Humayun returned to Agra, and restored order after disturbances from his brother, Hindal Mirza. Humayun mobilized a large force, and advanced with an army of 40,000, while Sher Shah amassed 15,000. Humayun met Sher Shah at Kannauj, with both armies mirroring each other across the Ganges River. Humayun crossed the river and began skirmishing with Sher Shah's army. Amidst the fighting, Humayun's army saw many nobles hiding their insignia to prevent them from being recognized by the Afghans, with many nobles also fleeing from the battle. The Mughal army was defeated, which led to Humayun fleeing to Sindh. Following this victory, Sher Khan was crowned a second time on 17 May 1540 as Sher Shah, being declared as Emperor of Northern India, while also donning the epithet of Sultan Adil, meaning "Just King".

With the defeat and flight of Humayun, Sher Shah captured Delhi.

=== Reforms in Bengal (1540–1541) ===
Realizing the importance of Bengal, Sher Shah focused much of his administrative efforts in the region. Khijir Khan, the governor of Bengal under Sher Shah, led a revolt in March 1541. Sher Shah mobilized an army and lead it himself, defeating Khijir Khan and restoring Bengal under his suzerainty. Bengal was divided into 47 smaller administrative divisions, appointing them under a shiqdar, which would be oversighted by Kazi Fajilot as the chief supervisor of the Muqtars. These reforms saw the prominence of Afghans in Bengal, with many Afghans moving and settling in the region. Some of the Afghans who settled in the region would go on to establish the Muhammad Shahi dynasty, which ruled Bengal from 1553 to 1563, and the Karrani dynasty, which ruled from 1563 to 1576.

=== Advance into the Punjab and defeat of the Gakhars (1540–1542) ===
Following the flight of Humayun, Sher Shah continued in pursuit, advancing into the Punjab. Sher Shah advanced on Lahore, and caused panic among the Mughals. Kamran Mirza was not prepared to face Sher Shah, and as a result, retreated to Kabul, leaving the region to Sher Shah. Sher Shah captured Lahore in November 1540, with Afghan armies advancing as far as the Khyber Pass, but not extending his empire beyond the Indus as Sher Shah did not wish to incorporate many Afghans who enjoyed their independence and face difficulties with them. The Afghans also seized control of Multan in 1541, but did not pursue the retreat of the Mughals further, seeing them as no longer as a threat.

Not longer after, Sher Shah entered into conflict with the Gakhars, who had always been difficult to subjugate and were in friendly terms with Mughals since the times of Babur. Sher Shah resorted to diplomacy, inviting the Gakhar chief Sarang Khan and asking them to acknowledge him as the emperor of India. He gave an insulting response, sending Sher Shah a bow, an arrow and a lion cub to signify his defiance of Sher Shah's authority, which enraged Sher Shah. Sher Shah marched through the Punjab and killed Sarang Khan, laying waste to much of the countryside and taking many prisoners. Sher Shah also ordered construction of the Rohtas Fort to keep a check over them.

To further secure his rule over the Gakhars, and to wade off any threat of Mughal return, he left 50,000 men in the Punjab, while he returned toward the Bengal, whose governor he placed was becoming unruly. Regardless, the conflict of Gakhars with Sur dyansty continued until the end of Sur dyansty. Later many Niazi nobles under Haibat Khan Niazi took refuge with Gakhars when he rose in rebellion against Islam Shah Suri.

=== Conquest and consolidation of Gwalior and Malwa (1542) ===
In 1542, Sher Shah embarked on his campaign to Malwa. This was a result of fears of Malwa joining with the Mughals against Sher Shah. Sher Shah also faced the external threat of Humayun, who was attempting to forge a kingdom in Gujarat, and a forged alliance with the Malwa Sultanate would be threatening. As a result, the Afghan armies first began their march on Gwalior. Led by Shujaat Khan, Gwalior was subjugated under Afghan rule. With this, the threat of being flanked as the Afghans advanced further into Malwa were extinguished. After gaining the submission of Abul Qasim Beg, the Mughal wali of Gwalior, The Afghans continued their march to Sarangpur. Qadir Khan, the ruler of the Malwa Sultanate, being abandoned by his vassals who refused to support him, begged for the mercy of Sher Shah, who treated him well.

Despite former grudges, Sher Shah reconciliated and gave him gifts, and even gave Qadir Khan a Jagir in Bengal. Despite this, Qadir Khan did not like the generous offer, and instead, fled to Gujarat, with an attempt to re-capture him in a pursuit led by Shujaat Khan ending in failure. Sher Shah consolidated his new territories before returning to Agra. While returning to Agra, he received submission from the ruler of Ranthambore. Shujaat Khan was placed as the new governor of Malwa. Qadir Khan attempted to retrieve his lost territories, and entered in battle against Shujaat Khan on separate occasions. Despite numerical inferiority, Shujaat Khan decisively defeated the coalition of Qadir Khan. Shujaat Khan was awarded with over 12,000 horses due to his valiant efforts.

=== Conquest of Raisen (1543) ===
After the death of Bahadur Shah of Gujarat, Puran Mall recovered control of Raisin after it was annexed by Bahadur Shah in 1532. Upon his restored rule in the region, he led many tyrannical actions on the Muslim populace of the city. The survivors of this occasion developed a grudge against Puran Mall. Sher Shah, hearing of this, and seeking to obtain control of Raisen himself, began preparing for war. Sher Shah remarked:

I did wrong when I said I would go towards Bengal. If Almighty God would vouchsafe me a recovery from this fever I will return with all speed, and Puran Mall who has enslaved the families of the Muslims in Chanderi and has made dancing girls of their daughters and did not accompany my son Qutab Khan — him will I so punish that he may be a warning to others.

Before resorting to war, Sher Shah offered Varanasi to Puran Mall if he ceded Raisin. Puran Mall refused to agree to any offer, and as a result, Sher Shah declared war. Jalal Khan led the Afghan army, reaching Vidisha, where he merged forces with Sher Shah. The Afghan forces then advanced to Raisin, besieging it. The siege of the city lasted for six months until the artillery of Sher Shah destroyed the cities defences, which led to Puran Mall surrendering. The treaty observed the points that: Free passage to himself [Puran Mall] and his family with their belongings, The retirement of Sher Shah to a distance of two marches from the fort, and Adil Khan and Qutab Khan to bind themselves by solemn oaths that Puran Mall and his family will not be molested in any way.

Sher Shah and his army withdrew a distance of two marches from the fort per the agreement. However, Sher Shah then encountered widows of the chiefs of Chanderi, with many others waiting for Sher Shah along the roadside. They called out to Sher Shah:

We have suffered from this inhuman and malignant infidel all kinds of tyranny and oppression. He has slain our husbands and our daughters he has enslaved, and made dancing girls of them, and has seized our lands, and all our worldly goods for a long time past. ... If you do not give us justice, hereafter, in the day of resurrection when the first and the last of all men shall be collected together, we will accuse you.

Upon hearing this, and further seeing the ruined families of Muslim survivors, Sher Shah was reported to have tears dropped from his eyes, and his idea of the destruction of oppression overtook him. Furthermore, demanded by his army to take action, Sher Shah ordered an army led by Isa Khan Hajjab to lead a forced march, which caught up to the retreating detachment of Puran Mal. The Rajput forces put up resistance, but were entirely annihilated.

=== Second Punjab campaign and subjugation of upper Sindh (1543) ===
After conquering Multan in 1541, it was later overrun by Baloch tribes. As a result, Sher Shah began assembling for a campaign in 1543. It also aligned with his ideas of building a new road from Lahore to Multan. During this, a certain raider named Fateh Khan Jat looted the routes between Lahore and Delhi, which surmounted to numerous complaints in return. As a result, Sher Shah ordered Haibat Khan to put an end to the raids of Fateh Khan. Haibat Khan successfully trapped Fateh Khan in a mud fort around Fatehpur. Seeking no possible way of escaping the situation, Fateh Khan surrendered to Haibat Khan. However, the garrison of the fort led by Hinda Baluch made a sortie, breaking out of the fort and successfully fleeing. Despite this, Hinda Baluch was captured during the sortie. With this, the Balochi leaders were executed. Following the campaign, Haibat Khan would subjugate upper Sindh as far as Sehwan.

=== Conquest of Marwar (1543–1544) ===
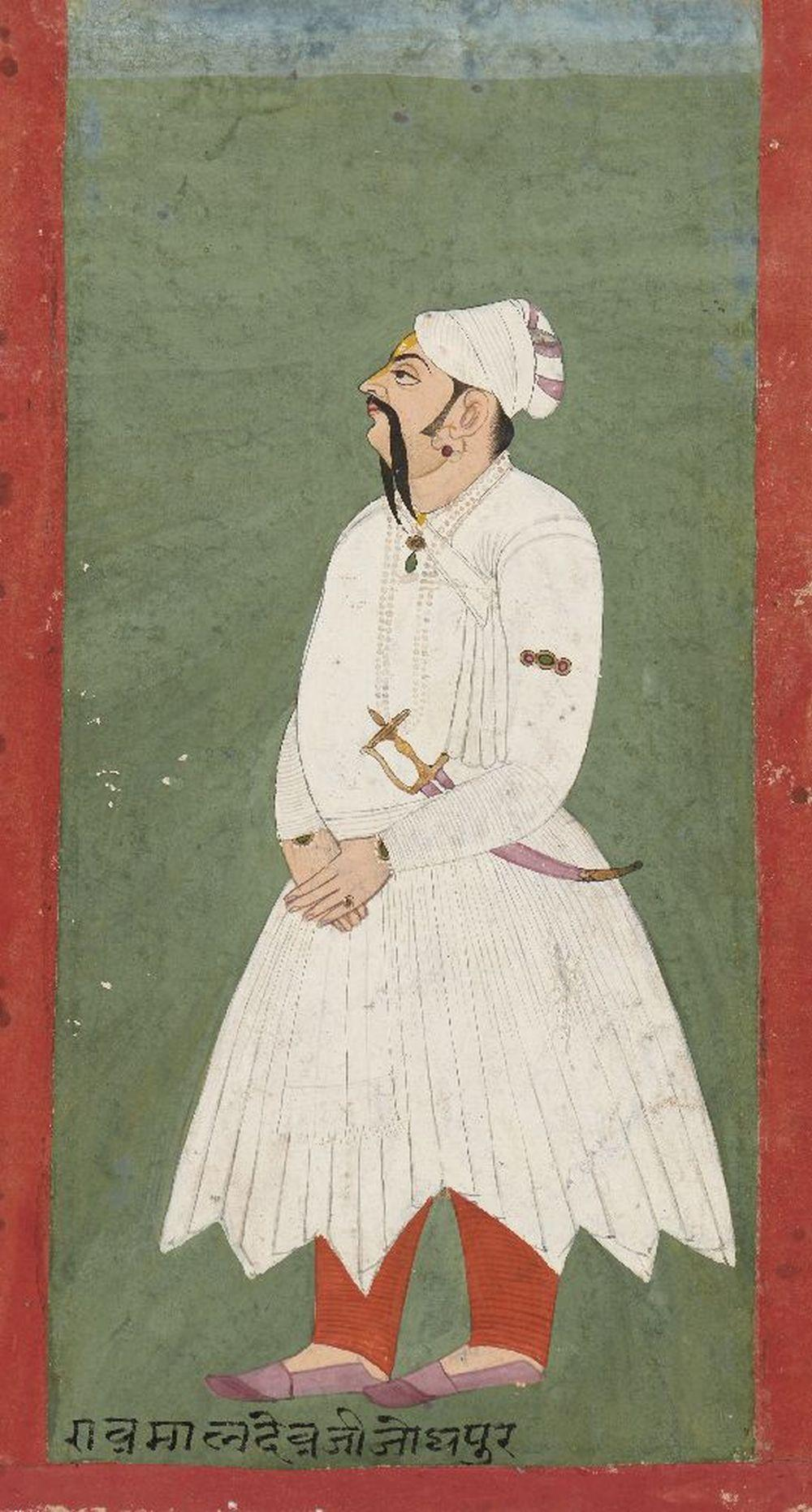
Painting of Rao Maldeo Rathore.

In 1543, Sher Shah Suri with a force of 80,000 cavalry set out against Maldeo Rathore, the Rajput king of Marwar. With an army of 50,000, Maldeo advanced to face Sher Shah's army. Instead of marching to the enemy's capital Sher Shah halted in the village of Sammel in the pargana of Jaitaran, ninety kilometres east of Jodhpur. After one month of skirmishing, Sher Shah's position became critical owing to the difficulties of food supplies for his huge army. To resolve this situation, Sher Shah resorted to a cunning ploy. One evening, he dropped forged letters near the Maldeo's camp in such a way that they were sure to be intercepted. These letters indicated, falsely, that some of Maldeo's army commanders were promising assistance to Sher Shah. This caused great consternation to Maldeo, who immediately suspected his commanders of disloyalty. Maldeo left for Jodhpur with his own men, abandoning his commanders to their fate. Following this, Maldeo's generals, Jaita and Kumpa, fought with a few thousand men against the Afghans, who wielded a force of 80,000 men and some cannons. In the ensuing battle of Sammel (also known as battle of Giri Sumel), Sher Shah emerged victorious, but several of his generals lost their lives and his army suffered thousands of casualties.

After this victory, Sher Shah's general Khawas Khan Marwat took possession of Jodhpur and occupied the territory of Marwar from Ajmer to Mount Abu in 1544. Maldeo was initially forced to retreat to Siwana, however after the death of Sher Shah he was able to recapture Jodhpur by July 1545 and the rest of his territories by 1546. In doing so he had to defeat the chain of garrisons that had been posted by Sher Shah before his death.

=== Death of Sher Shah (1545) ===
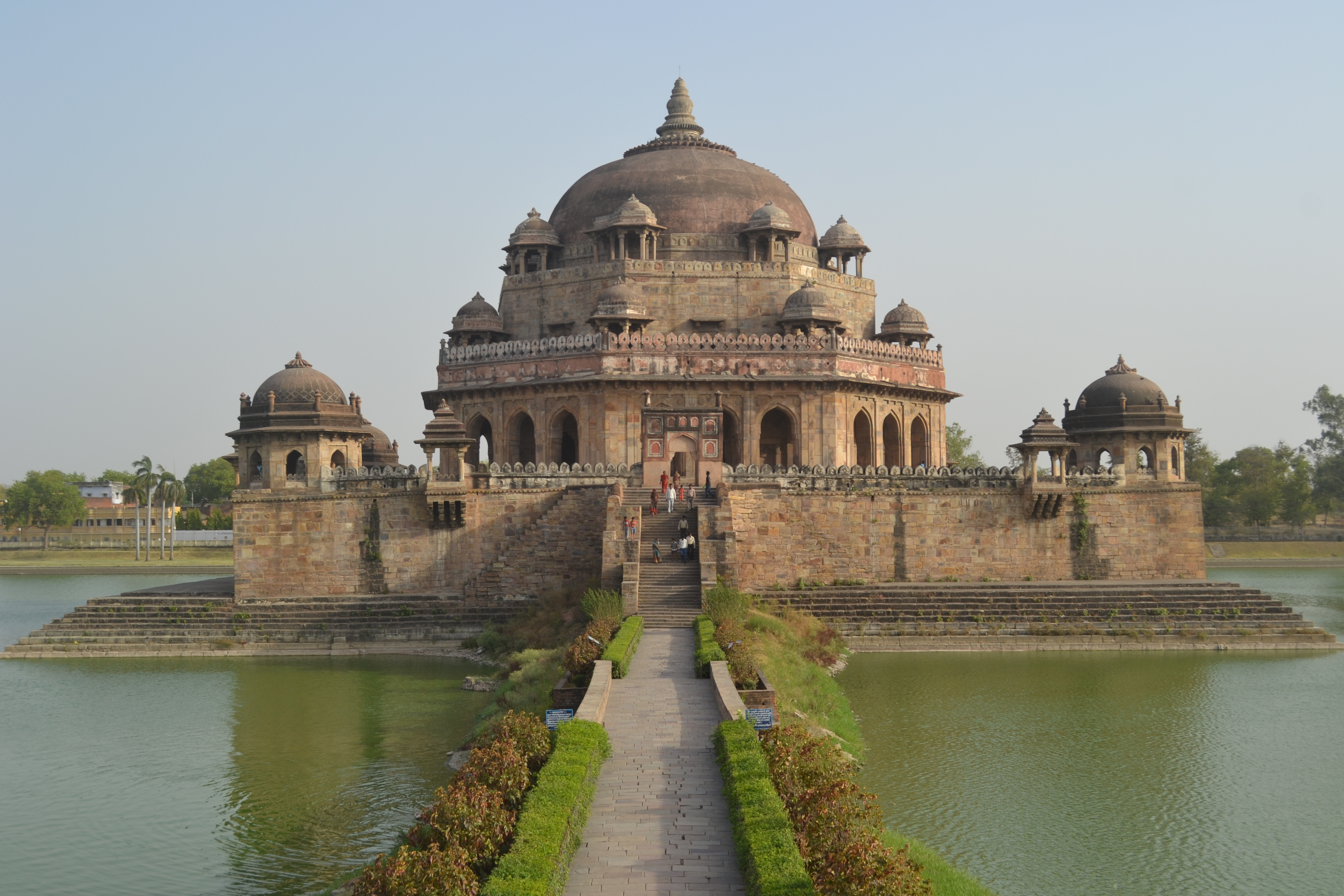
Sher Shah Suri Tomb at Sasaram

Following the conquest of Marwar, Sher Shah besieged Kalinjar Fort in 1544. While leading the siege, he was mortally wounded from a gunpowder explosion from one of his cannons bursting. Sher Shah was taken to his tent where he remained for two days. When he received the news that the fort finally fell, he remarked: "Thanks to Almighty god". Sher Shah succumbed to his wounds and died on 22 May 1545, at the age of 73 or 59. Sher Shah was buried in the Sher Shah Suri Tomb (122 ft high), which stands in the middle of an artificial lake at Sasaram, a town on the Grand Trunk Road. The tomb, whose construction Sher Shah had commissioned himself, was completed on 16 August 1545, three months after the death of Sher Shah.

=== Reign of Islam Shah Suri (1545—1553) ===
Sher Shah was succeeded by his second son Jalal Khan under the title Islam Shah. He faced rebellion from the amirs of his father. Kutb Khan, who was the commander of Kumaon Hills, fled to Punjab to seek refuge from Khawas Khan and Haibat Khan, after attempting to place Islam Shah's brother at throne, who agreed to support him. Niazis under Haibat Khan and Khawas Khan rose in rebellion against Islam Shah, who was forced to march himself against the rebels. At the battle of Ambala he was victorious and Niazis were routed. After getting defeated in another battle at Dhankot, Haibat Khan sought protection of Gakhars in 1548. For next two years Islam Shah marched against them but could not defeat Gakhars or capture Haibat Khan. In 1550, Niazis sought to find their way into Kashmir, but were opposed by Mirza Haidar Dughlat who defeated them at Sambla, and sent heads of Haibat Khan and his family to Islam Shah.

Islam Shah built a chain of fortresses north of Sialkot to defend against possible Mughal invasion and also to keep Gakhar and other hill clans under check. He also planned to destroy Lahore to prevent it falling into the hands of his enemies, although this plan was ultimately not implemented.

=== Civil war and Mughal reconquest (1554—1557) ===
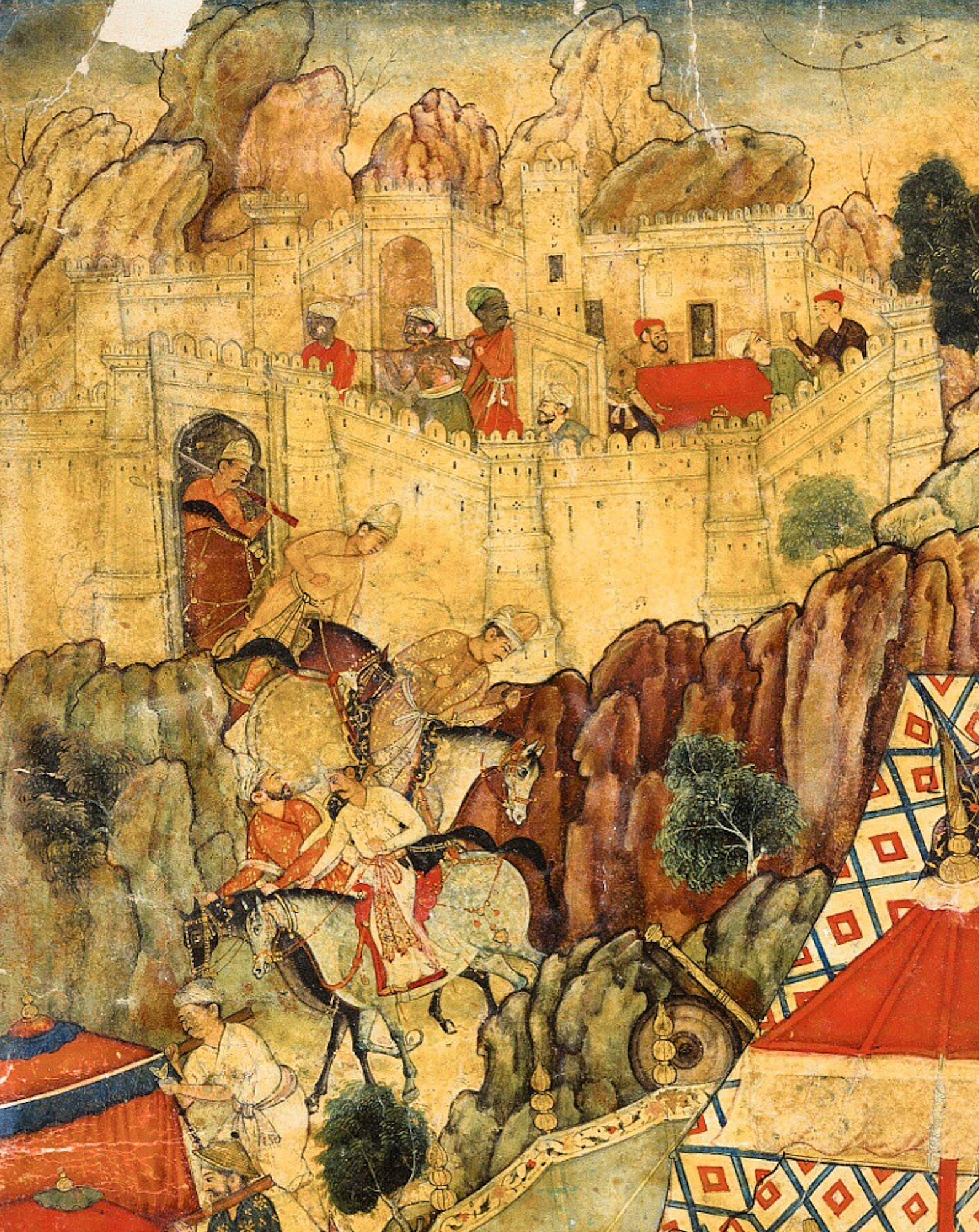
Afghan troops surrendering to Mughal forces at the Siege of Mankot (1557). Akbarnama (1590–95)

One of the last events of the Mughal reconquest occurred in the summer of 1557, with the siege of Mankot, where Sikandar Shah Suri had taken refuge. Sikandar surrendered to the Mughal forces led by Bairam Khan on 25 July 1557, after 6 months of stiff resistance using artillery and matchlocks. Sikandar was pardoned and entered the service of emperor Akbar, but soon fell out of favour.

== Legacy ==
The Sur dynasty held control of nearly all the Mughal territories, from Balochistan in the west to modern-day Bangladesh in the east.

Despite its short reign, the Sur Empire significantly influenced Mughal administrative reforms when they returned to power, most notably under Mughal Emperor Akbar.

It was at the time of this bounty of Sultán Bahlul [Lodi], that the grandfather of Sher Sháh, by name Ibráhím Khán Súr,*The Súr represent themselves as descendants of Muhammad Súr, one of the princes of the house of the Ghorian, who left his native country, and married a daughter of one of the Afghán chiefs of Roh. with his son Hasan Khán, the father of Sher Sháh, came to Hindu-stán from Afghánistán, from a place which is called in the Afghán tongue "Shargarí",* but in the Multán tongue "Rohrí". It is a ridge, a spur of the Sulaimán Mountains, about six or seven kos in length, situated on the banks of the Gumal. They entered into the service of Muhabbat Khán Súr, Dáúd Sáhú-khail, to whom Sultán Bahlol had given in jágír the Parganas of Hariána and Bahkála, etc., in the Panjáb, and they settled in the pargana of Bajwára.

— Abbas Khan Sarwani, 1580

== Government and administration ==
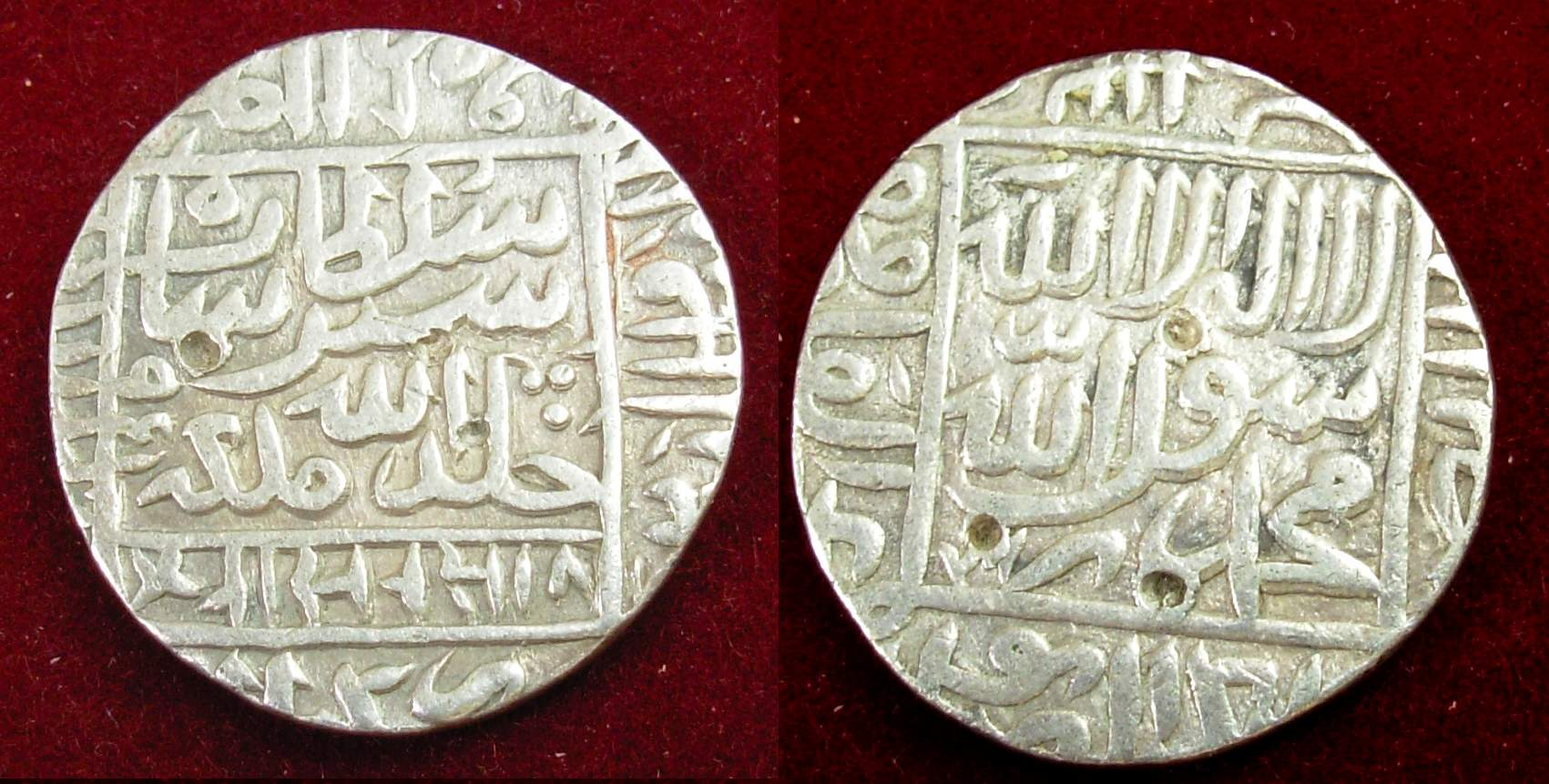
Rupiya released by Sher Shah Suri, 1538–1545 CE, was the first Rupee

The system of tri-metalism which came to characterize Mughal coinage was introduced by Sher Shah. While the term rūpya had previously been used as a generic term for any silver coin, during his rule the term rūpee came to be used as the name for a silver coin of a standard weight of 178 grains, which was the precursor of the modern rupee. The Rupee is today used as the national currency in India, Indonesia, Maldives, Mauritius, Nepal, Pakistan, Seychelles, and Sri Lanka. Gold coins called the Mohur weighing 169 grains and copper coins called Paisa were also minted during his reign. According to numismatists Goron and Goenka, it is clear from coins dated AH 945 (1538 AD) that Sher Khan had assumed the royal title of Farid al-Din Sher Shah and had coins struck in his own name prior to the battle of Chausa.

Sher Shah was responsible for greatly rebuilding and modernizing the Grand Trunk Road, a major artery which runs all the way from modern day Bangladesh to Afghanistan. Caravanserais (inns) and mosques were built and trees were planted along the entire stretch on both sides of the road to provide shade to travellers. Wells were also dug, especially along the western section. He also established an efficient postal system, with mail being carried by relays of horse riders.

=== Provincial and local administration ===
The Sur empire consisted of many subdivisions, referred to as Iqtas. Some of these provinces were ruled by military governors, such as Haibat Khan, who governed the Punjab. Haibat Khan had control of over 30,000 men, and was able to give jagirs to his own soldiers. Khwas Khan was another military governor, who ruled over Rajasthan, and assembled over 20,000 men. The head of Iqtas were known by different names, such as Hakim, Faujdar, or Momin. These head of Iqtas had their own bodies of men, which were usually less than 5,000 men. The responsibility of these heads were instilling order and law in the subdivisions they controlled.

Iqtas themselves were divided into districts, named Sarkars. Sarkars had two chief officers, the Shiqar, and Munsif. Shiqars were tasked with the responsibility of civil administration, and themselves could field 200-300 soldiers to maintain law and order in their districts. The Munsif of a Sarkar was responsible for revenue collection, and civil justice. The chief Shiqars would often handle cases of criminal justice.

Sarkars were also in turn divided into two or three Parganas. A Pargana was a moderately sized town and surrounding villages. In every Pargana, there was a Shiqar, Munsif, and one treasurer who went under the title of Fotdar. They were also accompanied by a Karkun who could write in Hindi and Persian. The Shiqar of a Pargana would be a military officer under the oversight of the Shiqar of the Sarkar. The responsibilities of a Shiqar in a Pargana were to maintain stability, and assist the Munsif in collection of land revenues, and measuring land. While the Munsif in the Pargana would be under the oversight of the chief Munsif in the Sarkar.

Villages were often autonomous and were governed by their own assemblies called Panchayats. This was respected by Sher Shah during his reign. Each assembly consisted of elders of a village who looked after the needs of villagers and instructed their own punishments in respect to the customs of the community. The chief of a village would be a form of a diplomat between the villages and the higher government.

=== Religious policy ===
The religious policy of Sher Shah is debated amongst historians. Dr. Qanungo states that Sher Shah upheld religious tolerance toward Hindus. Ram Sharma states that Sher Shah Suri was heavily devoted to his faith, always praying the five prayers. And on other occasions, claimed that Sher Shah's wars against the Rajputs were a Jihad. The war against Puran Mall was described as a Jihad, and his treatment of Maldeo was argued as signs of religious intolerance. However, he was always tolerant of Hindus, and did not hold any grudges against them, or wage propaganda.

According to Srivastava, Sher Shah's balance made his fellow Muslims content with his lenient treatment of Hindus. Sher Shah's evaluated policy was seen that Islam should hold supremacy over the lands he had conquered, but not to displace Hinduism.

=== Army ===
Sher Shah's army defeated the Mughals and drove them out of India. Sher Shah invited Afghans from across the empire and gave them high positions, with himself taking interest in recruiting troops. Sher Shah also promoted out of merit. The Afghan army utilized heavy emphasis on their cavalry, while his infantry were armed with muskets. One of his reforms included splitting up his armies into divisions, which was led by a commander. Discipline was strict, with provisions being given by Banjaras, who accompanied the army. Men were also assigned roles, attributing to the system of the Dagh, with spies being able to be rooted out using this method.

Sher Shah also considered Pashto a sign of friendliness, and gave higher salaries to Afghans who could speak Pashto in his army.

In 1540, Sher Shah's army consisted of over 150,000 cavalrymen, 25,000 infantrymen, and over 5,000 war elephants.

=== Social Justice ===
One of the things Sher Shah Suri was renowned for was giving justice. Courts were held by Qadis, with Sher Shah as well observing civil cases. Hindus settled their disputes in Panchayat assemblies, while in criminal cases, nobody was exempt from the law of the empire. The criminal law of the empire was extremely harsh, and done so to prevent others from doing a crime out of fear of the repercussions. Sher Shah gave heavy punishments for people in high posts, including government officials.

The reputation of Sher Shah was formidable in this regard as a just ruler, to the point where merchants could travel through and sleep in deserts without fear of being harassed by bandits or robbers. The soldiers of Sher Shah acted as police, with the duty of these soldiers to look for thieves and robbers. Sher Shah Suri also implemented the reform of self-responsibility. It was the duty assigned to officials to find the culprits of different cases in examples such as murder, lest the officials be held responsible themselves and be hanged. As a result of these reforms, historians praise it for its effectiveness.

=== Buildings ===
Sher Shah built several monuments including Rohtas Fort (now a UNESCO World Heritage Site in Pakistan), many structures in the Rohtasgarh Fort in Bihar, the Sher Shah Suri Masjid in Patna, the Qila-i-Kuhna Mosque inside the Purana Qila complex in Delhi, and the Sher Mandal, an octagonal building also inside the Purana Qila complex, which later served as the library of Humayun. He built a new city, Bhera, in present-day Pakistan in 1545, including within it a grand masjid named after him.

The mausoleum of Sher Shah Suri is described as one of the most beautiful monuments in India, due to its grandeur and dignity. Cunningham even was inclined to prefer it over the Taj Mahal.

=== Trade ===
Amongst his magnitude of reforms while consolidating the empire, Sher Shah Suri abolished taxes that were held on the borders of provinces. This was due to Sher Shah wishing to invigorate trade throughout India, and only two levies remaining in place, with them being upon goods being brought into the country, and the second for when goods were sold. Customs as a result, were entirely removed.

== List of rulers ==
No.	Picture	Name	Birth date	Death date	Reign	Notes
1		Sher Shah Suri (شیر شاہ سوری)	1472 or 1486	22 May 1545	6 April 1538/17 May 1540 — 22 May 1545	
2		Islam Shah Suri (اسلام شاہ سوری)	1507	22 November 1554	26 May 1545 — 22 November 1554	Son of Sher Shah Suri.
3	N/A	Firuz Shah Suri (فیروز شاہ سوری)	4 May 1542	22 November – December 1554	December 1554	Son of Islam Shah Suri.
4	N/A	Muhammad Adil Shah (محمد عادل شاہ)	unknown	1557	December 1554 – January 1555 — 1555	Son-in-law of Sher Shah Suri.
5	N/A	Ibrahim Shah Suri (ابراہیم شاہ سوری)	unknown	1567/1568	January – February 1555	Brothers-in-law of Sher Shah Suri.
6	Sikandar_Shah_Suri,_in_front_of_Akbar,_25_July_1557.	Sikandar Shah Suri (سکندر شاہ سوری)	unknown	1559	February 1555 — 22 June 1555	Brothers-in-law of Sher Shah Suri.
7	N/A	Adil Shah Suri (عادل شاہ سوری)	unknown	April 1557	22 June 1555 — 1556	Brother of Sikandar Shah Suri.

== See also ==
- Sur (Pashtun tribe)
- Delhi Sultanate
- List of Sunni dynasties

== Sources ==
- Ali Khan, Zulfiqar (1925). Sher Shah Suri, Emperor of India. Lahore: Civil and Military Gazette Press.
- Asher, Catherine B. (1977). "The Mausoleum of Sher Shāh Sūrī". Artibus Asiae. 39 (3/4): 273–298. doi:10.2307/3250169. JSTOR 3250169.
- Bhattacherje, S. B. (2009). Encyclopaedia of Indian Events & Dates. Sterling Publishers. ISBN 978-81-207-4074-7. Archived from the original on 21 January 2024.
- Brown, Percy (1939). "The Influence of Sher Shah Sur on the Islamic Architecture of India". Proceedings of the Indian History Congress. 3: 636–646. ISSN 2249-1937. JSTOR 44252417. Archived from the original on 6 September 2023.
- Chandra, Satish (2005) [First published 1999]. Medieval India: From Sultanat to the Mughals - Part Two: Mughal Empire (1526–1748) (3rd ed.). Har-Anand Publications. ISBN 978-81-241-1066-9. Archived from the original on 21 January 2024.
- Chandra, Satish (2007). History of Medieval India: 800-1700. Orient BlackSwan. ISBN 978-81-250-3226-7. Archived from the original on 10 March 2023.
- Chaudhuri, J. N. (2006) [First published 1974]. "Sher Shāh and His Successors". In Majumdar, R. C. (ed.). The Mughal Empire. The History and Culture of the Indian People. Vol. 7. Mumbai: Bharatiya Vidya Bhavan. OCLC 3012164.
- Dias, Peter (1996). The Steward. Orient Blackswan. ISBN 978-81-250-0325-0. Archived from the original on 11 January 2024.
- Goron, Stan; Goenka, J. P. (2001). The Coins of the Indian Sultanates. Munshiram Manoharlal Publishers. ISBN 978-81-215-1010-3.
- Hartel, Herbert (1997). "India under the Moghol Empire". In Kissling, H. J.; Barbour, N.; Spuler, Bertold; Trimingham, J. S.; Bagley, F. R. C. (eds.). The Last Great Muslim Empires. BRILL. pp. 262–263. ISBN 90-04-02104-3. Archived from the original on 10 March 2023.
- Hooja, Rima (2006). A history of Rajasthan. Rupa and Company. ISBN 978-81-291-1501-0. Archived from the original on 21 January 2024.
- Jenkins, Everett Jr (2015). The Muslim Diaspora (Volume 2, 1500-1799): A Comprehensive Chronology of the Spread of Islam in Asia, Africa, Europe and the Americas. McFarland. ISBN 978-1-4766-0889-1. Archived from the original on 11 January 2024.
- Kennedy, Pringle (1905). A History of the Great Moghuls: Or, A History of the Badshahate of Delhi from 1398 A.D. to 1739, with an Introduction Concerning the Mongols and Moghuls of Central Asia. Thacker, Spink. Archived from the original on 16 October 2023.
- Mahajan, Vidya Dhar (1968). India Since 1526 (8th ed.). S. Chand.
- Matta, Basheer Ahmad Khan (2005). Sher Shah Suri: A Fresh Perspective. Oxford University Press. ISBN 978-0-19-597882-7. Archived from the original on 16 October 2023.
- Mehta, J. L. Advanced Study in the History of Medieval India. Sterling Publishers Pvt. Ltd. ISBN 978-81-207-1015-3. Archived from the original on 21 January 2024.
- Mikaberidze, Alexander (2011). Conflict and Conquest in the Islamic World: A Historical Encyclopedia [2 volumes]: A Historical Encyclopedia. ABC-CLIO. ISBN 978-1-59884-337-8. Archived from the original on 21 January 2024.
- Puri, B. N.; Das, M. N. (2003). A Comprehensive History of India: Comprehensive history of medieval India. Sterling Publishers. ISBN 978-81-207-2508-9. Archived from the original on 21 January 2024.
- Roy, Kaushik (2015). Military Manpower, Armies and Warfare in South Asia. Routledge. ISBN 978-1-317-32128-6. Archived from the original on 16 October 2023.
- Sud, Anuradha (2016). Transitions – History and Civics – 7 (Revised ed.). Vikas Publishing House. ISBN 978-93-259-9395-2. Archived from the original on 11 January 2024.
- Thomas, Edward (1967). The Chronicles of the Pathan Kings of Delhi. Delhi: Munshiram Manoharlal. ISBN 978-81-215-0360-0.
