= Muhammad Adil Shah Suri =

Sultan of the Suri Empire from 1554 to 1555

Muhammad Adil Shah
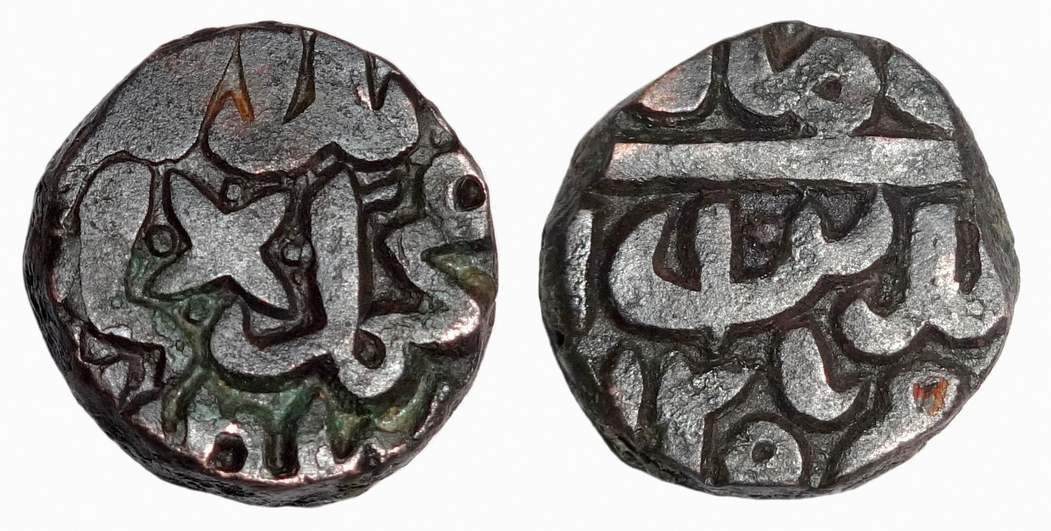
- Copper Half Paisa of Adil Shah Suri

4th Sultan of the Sur Empire
- Reign: 25 November 1554 – January 1555
- Predecessor: Firuz Shah Suri
- Successor: Ibrahim Shah Suri
- Died: 1557
Names
- Muhammad Mubāriz Khān
- House: Sur
- Dynasty: Sur
- Religion: Sunni Islam

Muhammad Adil Shah (Muhammad Mubariz Khan; died 1557) was Sultan of the Sur Empire from December 1554 until his defeat in January 1555. He was the last Suri ruler of the united empire, after which the empire fell into civil war.

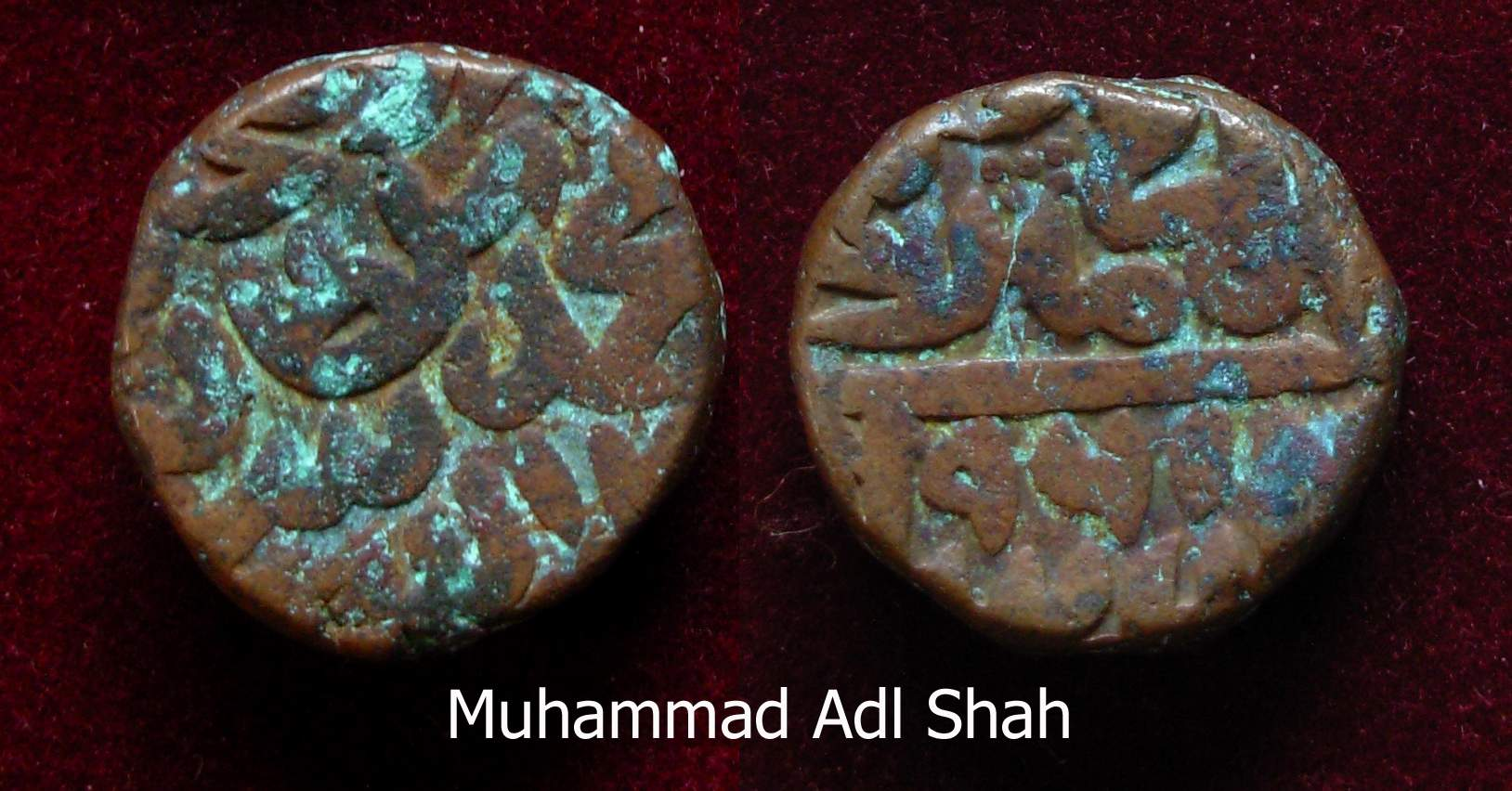
Copper Dam of Muhammad Adil Shah

== Early life ==
He was the son of Nizam Khan, the younger brother of the Sultan Sher Shah Suri. Adil's sister, Bibi Bai, was married to Islam Shah Suri. His real name was Muhammad Mubariz Khan. He was responsible for the assassination of Firuz Shah Suri, the twelve-year-old son of Islam Shah Suri, in 1554. Then he ascended the throne as the last sultan of the united empire. He appointed Hemu as his Wazir.

== Biography ==
Dil Shah (also known as Adil Shah) tried to win over the nobles and the army by giving them large sums of money and titles. However, his act of killing the rightful ruler led to serious consequences and marked the beginning of the end for the Sur dynasty. Although he was weak and ineffective as a ruler, he appointed a very capable minister named Hemu—a Hindu from a modest background who had risen through important positions under the previous ruler, Islam Shah. Despite Hemu's abilities, Dil Shah's weak leadership allowed different parts of the empire to break apart. Ibrahim Khan Sur, who was in charge of Agra, rebelled by defeating the army sent against him and took over Delhi for himself. At the same time, Ahmad Khan Sur, the governor of Lahore, declared independence under the title Sikandar Shah, and Muhammad Khan Sur in Bengal also revolted, calling himself Shams-ud-din Muhammad Shah Ghazi. The once-unified empire split into four main regions, Delhi and Agra under Ibrahim Shah Suri, Panjab under Sikandar Shah Suri, Bengal under Shams-ud-din Muhammad Shah, and the area from Agra to Bihar under Muhammad Adil Shah. Sikandar Shah Suri went on to fight Ibrahim near Agra in 1555 and won, capturing both Delhi and Agra. As the internal conflicts continued, Humayun seized the opportunity to return from Kabul in November 1554. His forces quickly took over important areas like Lahore, Jalandhar, and Sirhind. In the process, Mughal troops, led by Akbar’s generals, defeated their Afghan opponents and captured Delhi.

Meanwhile, the fighting among the Afghan rulers did not stop. Hemu, acting as Dil Shah’s prime minister, won two battles against one of the rebel leaders near Kalpi and Khanua, forcing him to hide in the fort of Bayana. Later, after Humayun’s death in January 1556 and the accession of young Akbar, Hemu advanced with a large force from Gwalior, capturing Agra when its governor fled, and then took Delhi after defeating its governor.

Feeling strong after these victories, Hemu declared himself independent with the title Raja Vikramaditya and distributed wealth generously among his officers to secure their loyalty. He prepared to resist the Mughal forces, and a large battle took place on November 5, 1556, at Panipat. Although his army was larger, an arrow struck Hemu in the eye, and he fell unconscious. Believing their leader was dead, his troops lost heart and fled. Hemu was captured and later killed by Mughal forces under Akbar and his general Bairam Khan. After this decisive battle, Mughal rule was firmly established in Delhi and Agra.

== Military activities ==
In Panjab, Sikandar Shah Suri actively fought his enemies and defeated Khizr KhWaja Khan near Lahore at Chamiari. When Akbar and Bairam Khan moved against him, he took shelter in the fort of Mankot and held out for about six months, hoping that a distraction from Adil Shah, still holding Chunar, might help him. However, when Adil Shah was defeated and killed by Khizr Khan Sur of Bengal in 1557, Sikandar lost his resolve and surrendered. He was given a post in Bihar but was soon expelled by Akbar and died in Bengal about two years later. Meanwhile, Ibrahim Shah Suri fled to Orissa, where he was defeated around 1567–1568. With these rival leaders gone, the turmoil in northern India ended, clearing the way for Akbar to re-establish firm Mughal rule.

== See also ==
- Suri Empire

Preceded by Firuz Shah Suri	Shah of Delhi; 1554–1555	Succeeded by Ibrahim Shah Suri
