= Islam Shah Suri =

Sultan of the Suri Empire from 1545 to 1554

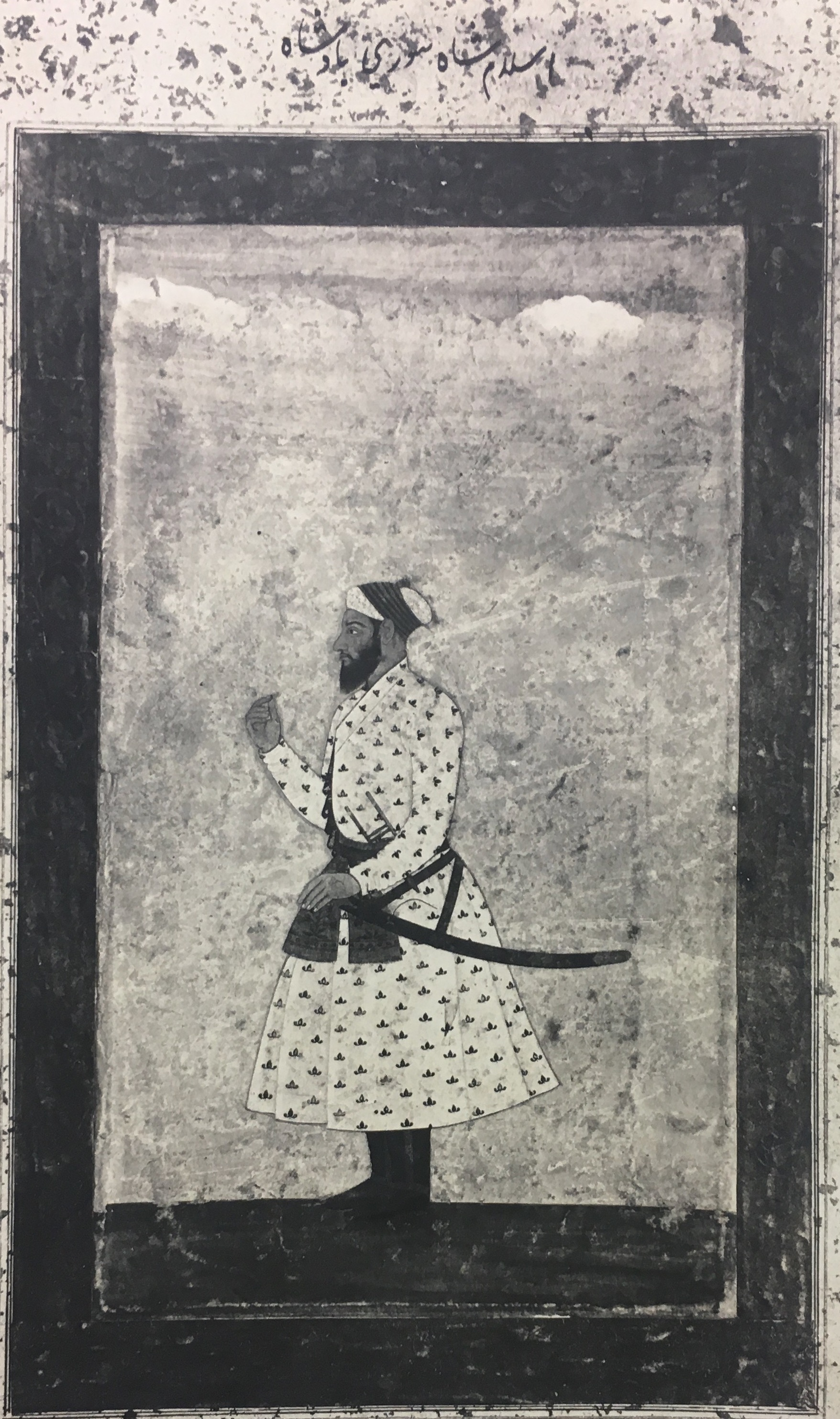
- Miniature of Islam Shah Suri

Sultan of Hindustan
- Reign: 27 May 1545 – 22 November 1554
- Coronation: 27 May 1545
- Predecessor: Sher Shah Suri
- Successor: Firuz Shah Suri
- Born: Jalal Khan; 1507; Delhi, Delhi Sultanate (present day India)
- Died: 22 November 1554 (aged 46–47)
- Spouse: Bibi Bai
- Issue: Firuz Shah Suri
- House: Sur
- Dynasty: Sur Empire
- Father: Sher Shah Suri
- Religion: Sunni Islam

Islam Shah Suri (born Jalal Khan; 1507 – 22 November 1554) also known as Salim Shah Suri, was Sultan of Hindustan from 27 May 1545 until his death in 1554. He was the second ruler of the Sur Empire which ruled parts of India in the mid-16th century. He was the second son of Sher Shah Suri.

== Biography ==
On his father's death, an emergency meeting of nobles chose Jalal Khan to be successor instead of his elder brother Adil Khan, since he had shown greater military ability. Jalal Khan was crowned on 26 May 1545 and took the title "Islam Shah". He was still worried that his brother would threaten his power and tried to have him captured. But Adil Khan evaded his grasp and raised an army. It marched on Islam Shah Suri while he was at Agra. In the battle Islam Shah came out victorious and Adil Khan fled eastwards, never to be seen again.

The support some nobles had given his brother made Islam Shah suspicious, leading him to ruthlessly purge their ranks and strictly subordinate the nobility to the crown. He continued his father's policies of efficient administration and increased centralization. He had little opportunity for military campaigning; the fugitive Mughal emperor Humayun, whom his father had overthrown, made one abortive attempt to attack him. Islam Shah did, however, lead one major campaign against Kalinjar.

=== Death and succession ===
Islam Shah died on 22 November 1554. He was succeeded by his son Firuz Shah Suri, who was only twelve. Within a few days the boy ruler had been murdered by Sher Shah's nephew Muhammad Mubariz Khan, who then ascended the throne as Muhammad Adil Shah Suri. The incomplete tomb of Islam Shah lies about a kilometer to the north-west of Sher Shah Suri's tomb.

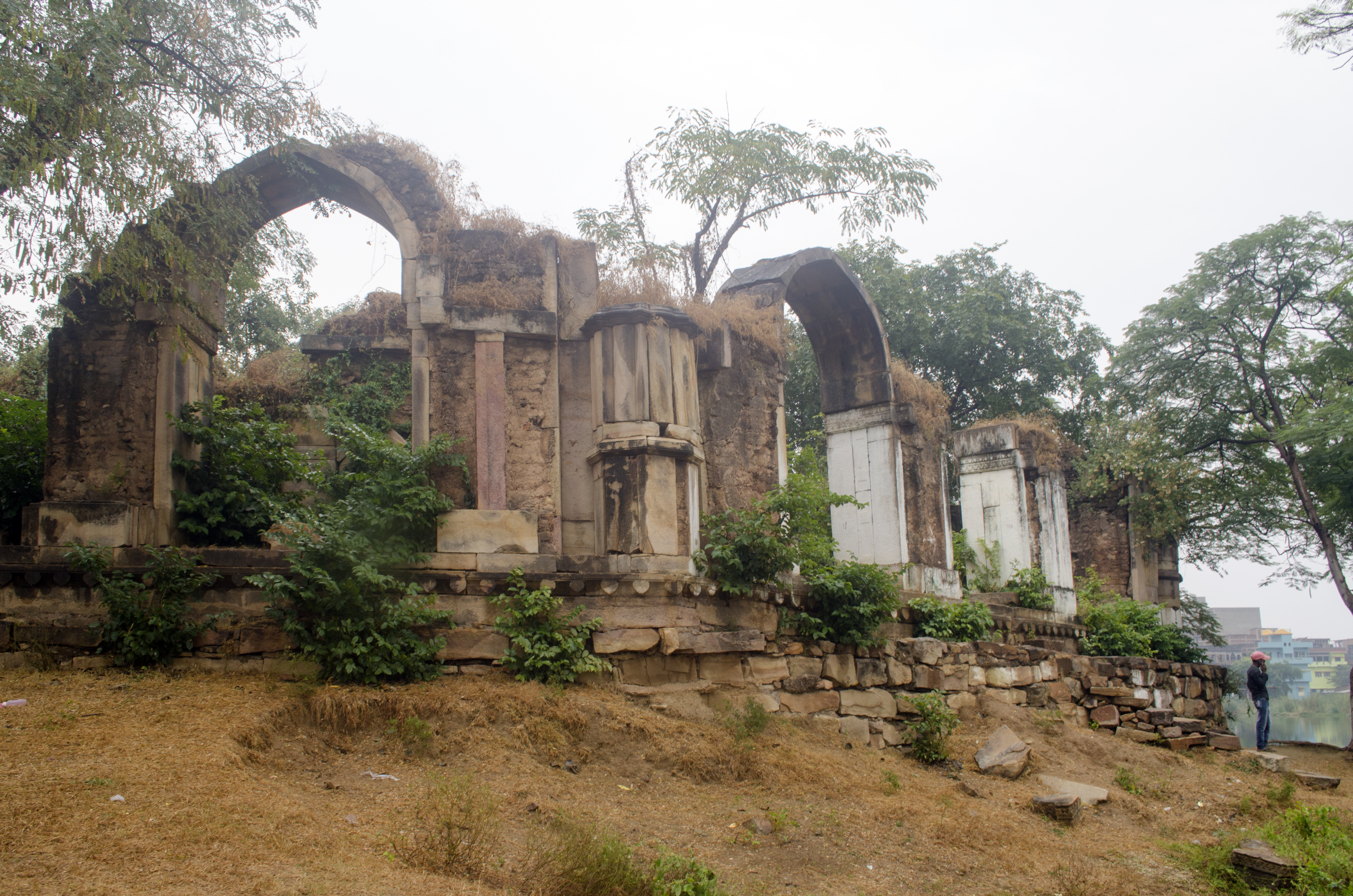
Incomplete tomb of Islam Khan at Sasaram Takia

=== Coinage under him ===
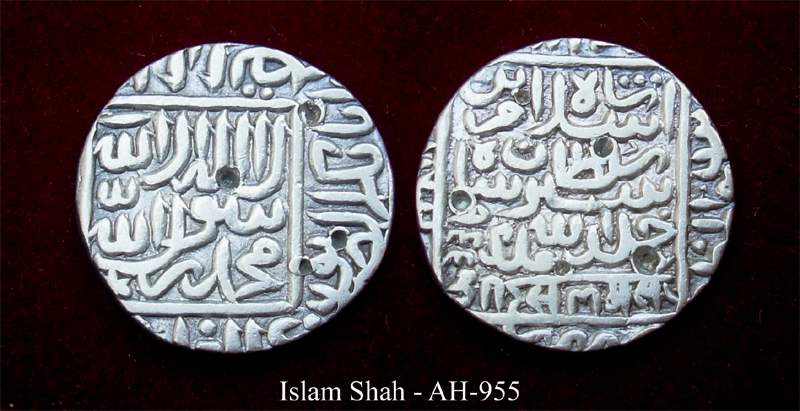
Silver Rupee of Islam Shah

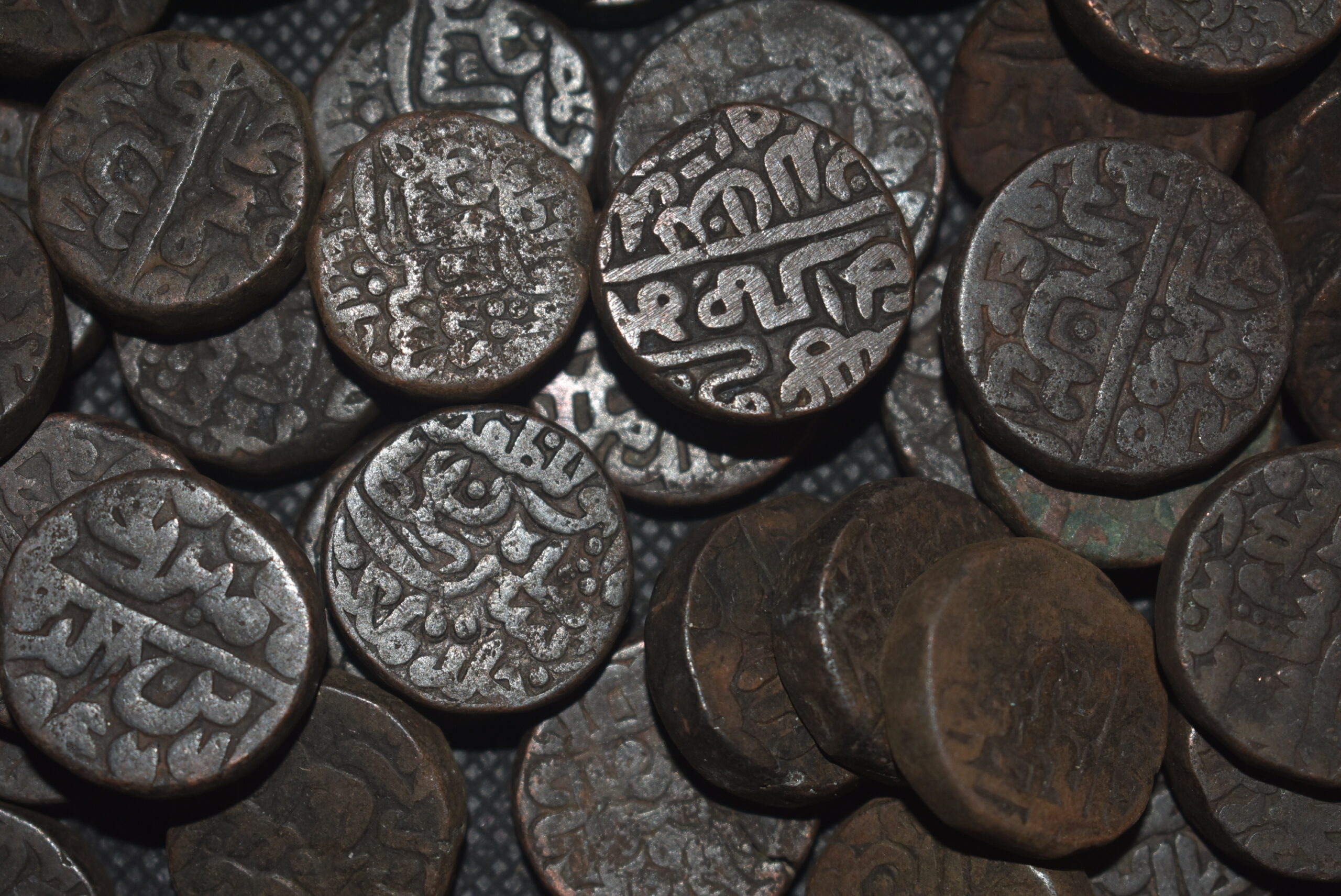
Copper 'Paisa' coins from the reign of Islam Shah Suri
