= Sikandar Shah Suri =

Sultan of the Suri Empire in 1555

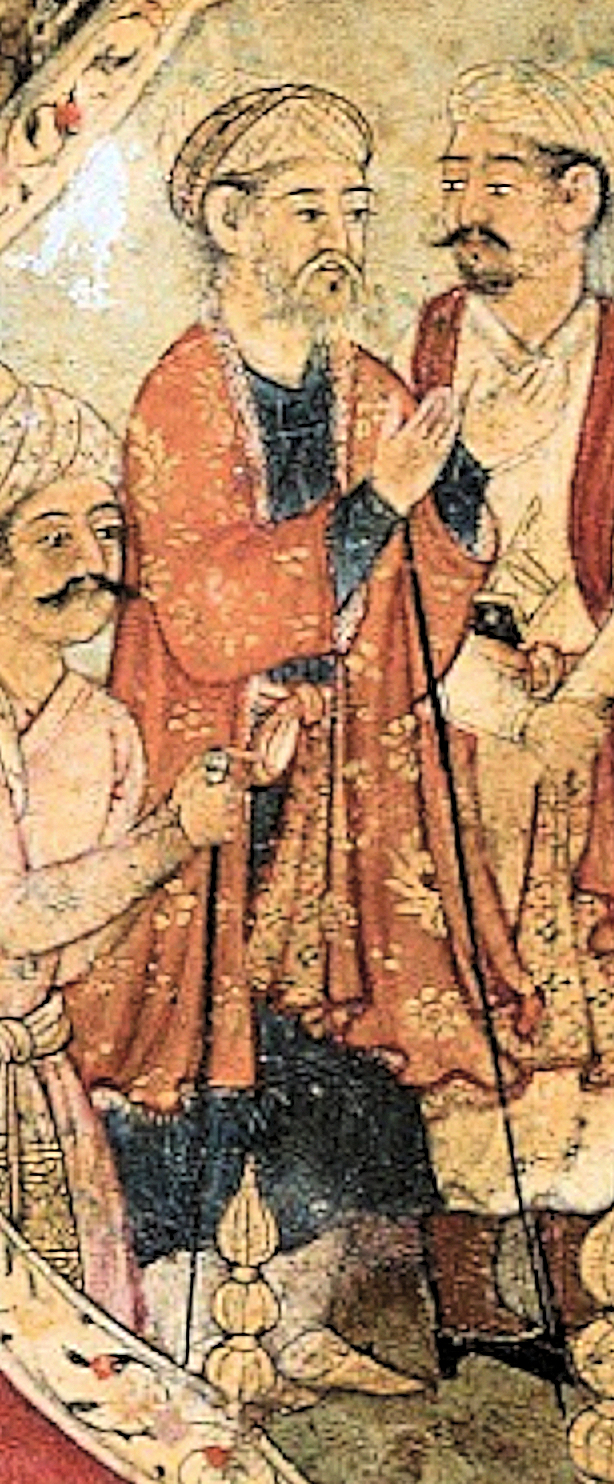
- Sikandar Shah Suri, in front of Akbar, at the surrender of the Siege of Mankot, 25 July 1557. Akbarnama (1590-95)

Sultan of Hindustan
- Reign: February 1555 – 22 June 1555
- Predecessor: Ibrahim Shah Suri
- Successor: Humayun Adil Shah Suri (titular; eastern portions of the empire)
- Died: 1559; Bihar, Mughal Empire
- Dynasty: Sur
- Religion: Sunni Islam

Sikandar Shah Suri (died 1559) was the last ruling Sultan of Hindustan from the Sur dynasty from February 1555 until his defeat on 22 June 1555, and the second-to-last ruler of the Surids. His defeat by Humayun and loss of Delhi marked the end of the Sur Empire's 15-year rule over the throne of Hindustan, although the Suris continued to rule the eastern portions of the empire for another year.

== Early life ==
Sikandar Shah Suri's actual name was Ahmad Khan Suri. He was the brother-in-law of sultan Muhammad Adil Shah. He was the Surid governor of Lahore before declaring independence from Delhi in 1555.

== Reign ==
After becoming the independent sultan and bringing the Punjab under control, he marched towards the territory controlled by Sultan Ibrahim Shah Suri. Sikandar defeated Ibrahim in a battle at Farah near Agra and took possession of both Delhi and Agra. While Sikandar was busy with his struggle against Ibrahim, Humayun captured Lahore in February 1555. Another detachment of his forces captured Dipalpur. Next, the Mughal army occupied Jalandhar and their advanced division proceeded towards Sirhind. Sikandar sent a force of 30,000 horses but they were defeated by the Mughal army in a battle at Machhiwara and Sirhind was occupied by the Mughals. Sikandar, then led an army of 80,000 horses himself and met the Mughals at Sirhind. On 22 June 1555 he was defeated by the Mughal army and was compelled to retreat to the Sivalik Hills in northern Punjab. The victorious Mughals marched to Delhi and occupied it.

== Later days ==
In late 1556, Sikandar became active again. He defeated Mughal general Khizr Khwaja Khan at Chamiari (presently in Amritsar district) and began to collect taxes with Kalanaur as his headquarters. Bairam Khan sent Khan Alam (Iskandar Khan) to assist Khizr Khwaja Khan and finally on 7 December 1556 Akbar along with Bairam Khan left Delhi to deal with him. Sikandar again retreated to the Sivaliks and took refuge in the fort at Mau under Nurpur kingdom, leading to the Siege of Mankot (1557). After six months of resistance from the besieged fort, Sikandar surrendered the fort on 25 July 1557. His local supporter, Raja Bakht Mal, Raja of Nurpur, was imprisoned at Lahore and later beheaded on orders of Bairam Khan. Sikandar was sent to Bihar where he died in 1559.

== Notes ==
Preceded by Ibrahim Shah Suri	Shah of Delhi; 1555	Succeeded by Adil Shah Suri
