= Sher Shah Suri Mosque =

Mosque in Bihar, India

- Location within Patna Location within Bihar Location within India

Religion
- Affiliation: Sunni Islam
- District: Patna district
- Province: Bihar
- Region: Magadh
- Ecclesiastical or organisational status: Islamic

Location
- Location: Patna
- Municipality: Patna Municipal Corporation
- State: India
- Coordinates: 25.611°N 85.144°E

Architecture
- Type: Medieval Mosque
- Style: Afghan
- Completed: 1545

Specifications
- Dome: 5
- Materials: Stone

Sher Shah Suri Mosque, also known as Shershahi Mosque, is a mosque in Patna, the capital city of the state of Bihar in India. It serves as an example of the Afghan style of architecture. Sher Shah Suri built this mosque in 1540–1545 to commemorate his reign. It is sited in the south-west corner of Purab Darwaza near Dhawalpura.

== History ==
The construction of the mosque began in 1540 under the reign of Sher Shah Suri and it was completed in 1545.

== Architecture ==
Built in Afghan architectural style, it is one of the many historic mosques in India and a landmark in Patna. There is a tomb inside the complex of the mosque which is covered by an octagonal stone slab. But the star attraction of the Sher Shah Suri Masjid is its central dome which lies in the middle of the roof and is surrounded by Four small domes. The unique part of this design is that if you view from any angle there appears to be only three domes.
