= Sur (tribe) =

Historical Pashtun tribe in Afghanistan and Pakistan

Sur (Pashto: سور) are a historical Pashtun tribe from among the Lodi living primarily in what is now Afghanistan and Pakistan. The founder of the Sur Empire in India, Sher Shah Sur, belonged to the Sur tribe. They ruled the Sur Empire from 1540 until they were removed from power in 1555 after the Battle of Sirhind by Humayun and the Persian army, who re-established the Mughal Empire.

== Mythical Origin ==
They have been described by some as being of descendance from Arab general Khalid ibn al-Walid.

== History ==
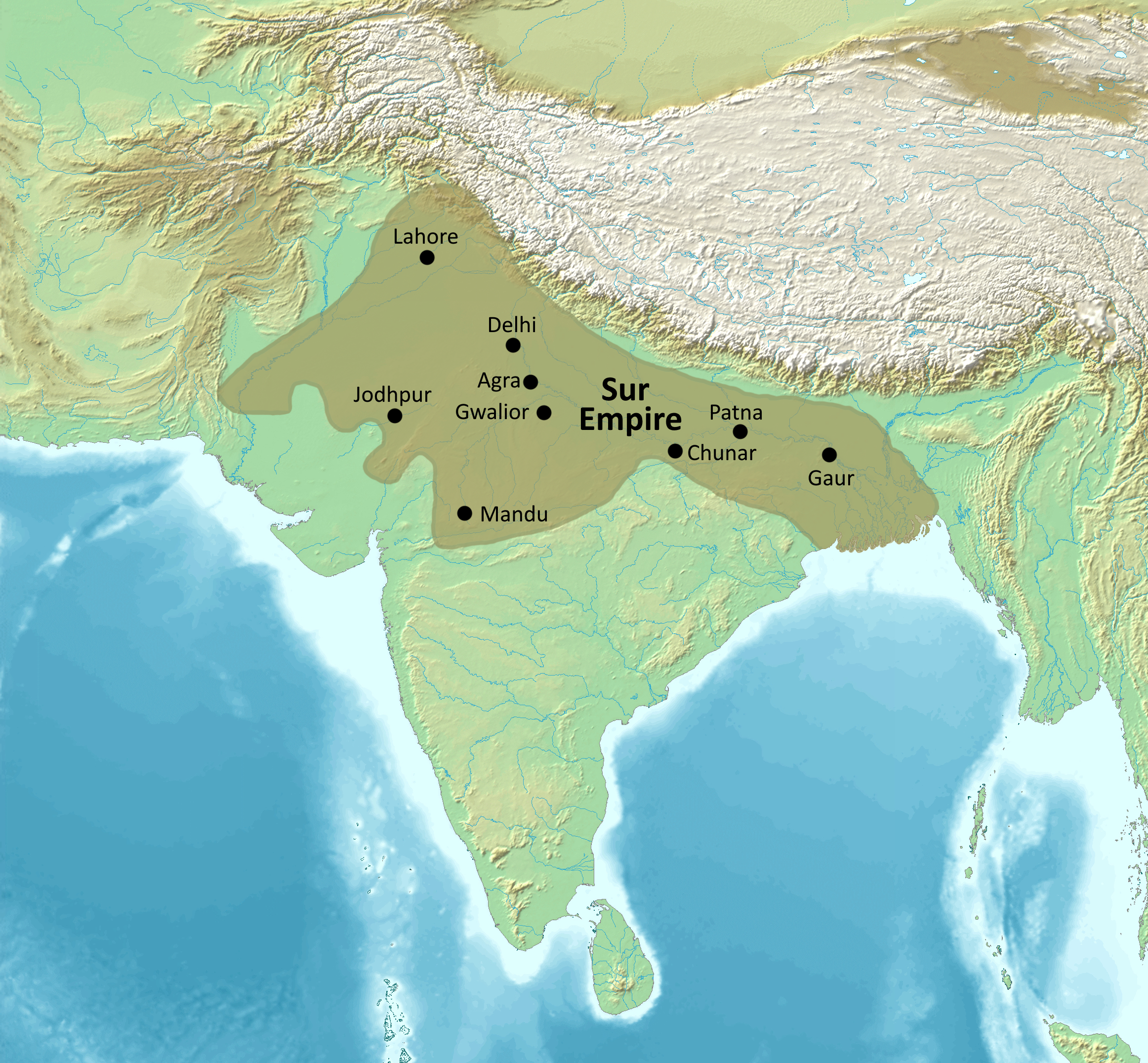
Map of the Sur Empire at its height under the reign of Sher Shah Suri

The Suri tribe of the Afghans inhabited the mountains of Ghor east of Furrah and their principal cities were Ghore, Feruzi and Bamian.

It was at the time of this bounty of Sultán Bahlol, that the grandfather of Sher Sháh, by name Ibráhím Khán Súr, (Note: The Súr represent themselves as descendants of Muhammad Súr, one of the princes of the house of the Ghorian, who left his native country, and married a daughter of one of the Afghán chiefs of Roh.) with his son Hasan Khán, the father of Sher Sháh, came to Hindu-stán from Afghánistán, from a place which is called in the Afghán tongue "Shargarí,"* but in the Multán tongue "Rohrí." It is a ridge, a spur of the Sulaimán Mountains, about six or seven kos in length, situated on the banks of the Gumal. They entered into the service of Muhabbat Khán Súr, Dáúd Sáhú-khail, to whom Sultán Bahlol had given in jágír the parganas of Hariána and Bahkála, etc., in the Panjáb, and they settled in the pargana of Bajwára.

— Abbas Khan Sarwani, 1580

== See also ==
- Sur Empire
- Suri (name)
- Pashtun tribes
- Mandesh
- Qais Abdur Rashid
- Amir Kror Suri
