= Ibrahim Shah Suri =

Sultan of the Suri Empire in 1555

Sultan of Hindustan
- Reign: January 1555 – February 1555
- Predecessor: Muhammad Adil Shah
- Successor: Sikandar Shah Suri
- Died: 1567/1568
- House: Sur dynasty
- Dynasty: Sur dynasty
- Religion: Sunni Islam

Ibrahim Shah Suri was Sultan of Hindustan from January 1555 until his deposition and defeat in February. He came to power after revolting against Adil Shah and defeating him, but was himself defeated by Sikandar Shah Suri who succeeded him shortly after.

== Reign ==
He was the governor of Agra in 1555, when he revolted against the sultan. Adil Shah dispatched his army to crush the revolt, but he defeated Adil's army and marched towards Delhi. After capturing Delhi, he assumed the regal title and became Ibrahim Shah Suri. But in the same year, Sikandar Shah Suri defeated him at Farah, 32 km from Agra in spite of the numerical superiority of Ibrahim's army. Sikandar took possession of both Delhi and Agra.

== Later days ==
After losing Delhi and Agra, Ibrahim began his strife with Adil Shah. But he was defeated by Adil's army led by his wazir Hemu twice, first near Kalpi and next near Khanua. He took refuge in the fort of Bayana, but it was besieged by Hemu's army. He got some respite when Hemu was recalled by Adil. Later, Ibrahim constructed a hill fort in Nurpur kingdom in alliance with Bakht Mal and attacked Mughals in Gurdaspur but once the Mughals prolonged the siege of Mau Fort, he had to retire at Orissa where he died on arrival in 1567-68.

== Notes ==
| Preceded by Muhammad Adil Shah | Shah of Delhi; 1555 | Succeeded by Sikandar Shah Suri |
