= Qila-i-Kuhna Mosque =

Mosque in Delhi, India

- Urdu: قلعہ کہنہ مسجد
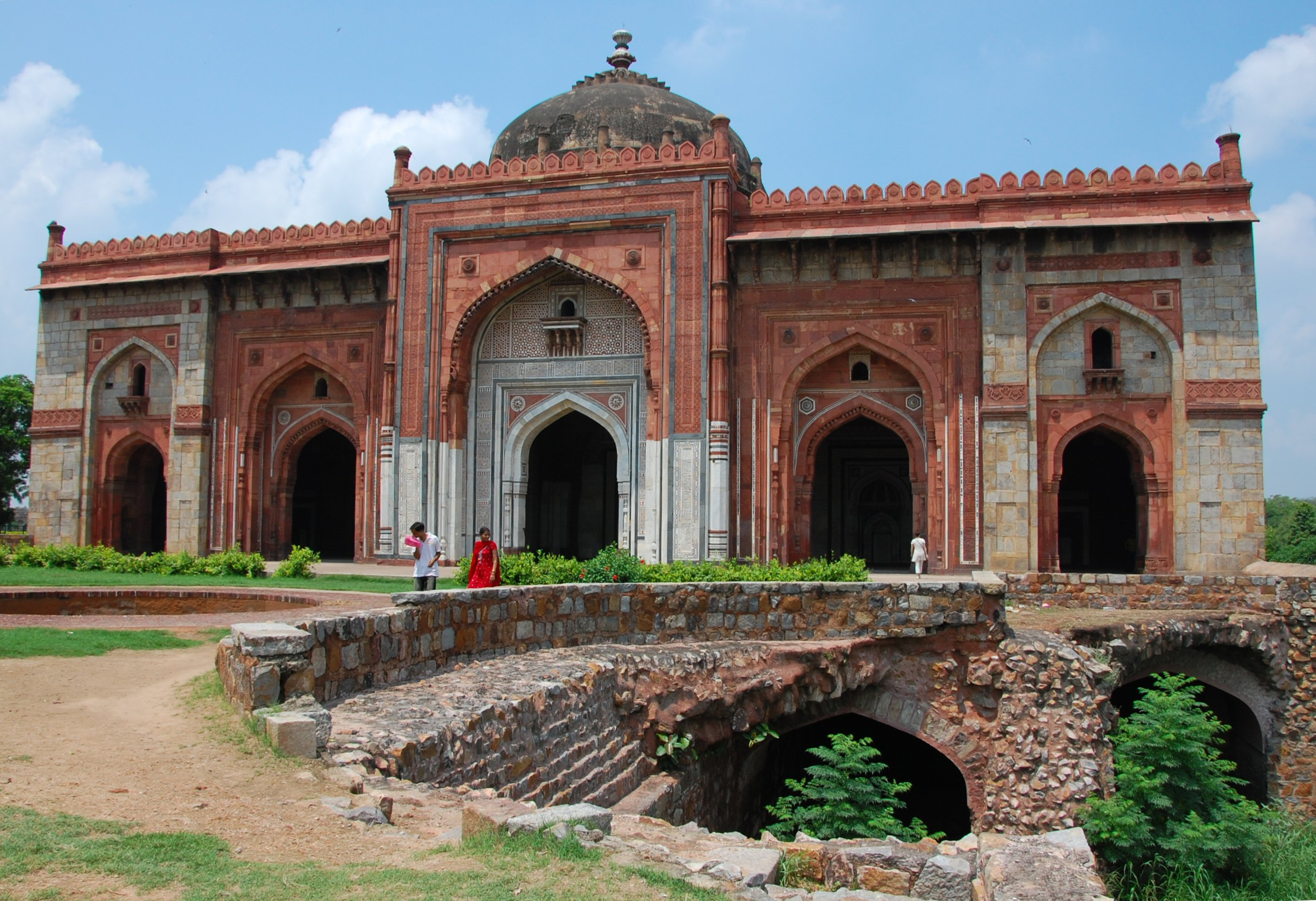
- The mosque in 2008

- Location of the mosque in Central Delhi

Religion
- Affiliation: Sunni Islam
- Rite: Hanafi
- Ecclesiastical or organisational status: Mosque
- Status: Active

Location
- Location: Purana Qila, Central Delhi, Delhi NCT
- Country: India
- Coordinates: 28°36′36″N 77°14′42″E

Architecture
- Type: Mosque architecture
- Style: Islamic; Lodi
- Completed: 1541 CE

Specifications
- Length: 51 m (167 ft)
- Width: 13.5 m (44 ft)
- Height (max): 20 m (66 ft)
- Dome: One
- Materials: Red sandstone; marble

Monument of National Importance
- Official name: Mosque of Sher Shah (Kila Kohna Masjid); (Qila-i-Kuhna mosque)
- Part of: Purana Qila
- Reference no.: N-DL-37

The Qila-i-Kuhna Mosque (Urdu: قلعہ کہنہ مسجد, lit. 'Mosque of the Old Fort'), also known as the Mosque of Sher Shah and the Kila Kohna Masjid, is an Hanafi Sunni, mosque located inside the Purana Qila (lit. 'Old Fort') in New Delhi, though part of Central Delhi, India.

After Sher Shah Suri defeated Humayun, he occupied Purana Qila. There, he built the mosque for his private use, which became a "symbol of his royal aspiration". The mosque is believed to have been constructed in 1541 CE.

The mosque is a Monument of National Importance, administered by the Archaeological Survey of India.

== Location ==
The mosque is located inside Sher Shah Suri's fort, Purana Qila, which became his fortification after he won Delhi. It is one of the structures beside the Sher Mandal (which is attributed as Humayun's library) present in the fort. The fort is located near the Delhi zoo.

== History ==
Derived from various accounts of contemporary historians, the mosque history is written by Abbas Sarwani, who claims that Tarikh-i-Sher Shahi, Sher Shah Suri built the mosque in 1540, from "gold, lapis lazuli" and other precious stones. He is said to have built the mosque to "revive" the city's status "as a major city". Historian MC Joshi argues that although Sher Shah completed the mosque, it was originally "designed" and its construction was started by Humayun. Joshi believes that Sher Shah built the upper part of the mosque which included the dome. The marble works of the exterior walls could be attributed to his son Akbar, because the geometric works are of his time and not of pre-Akbar era. The use of half-dome, pointed arches represents "A strong Mughal association". Humayun is credited with "introducing pietra dura" works in the liwan and mihrab.

== Features ==
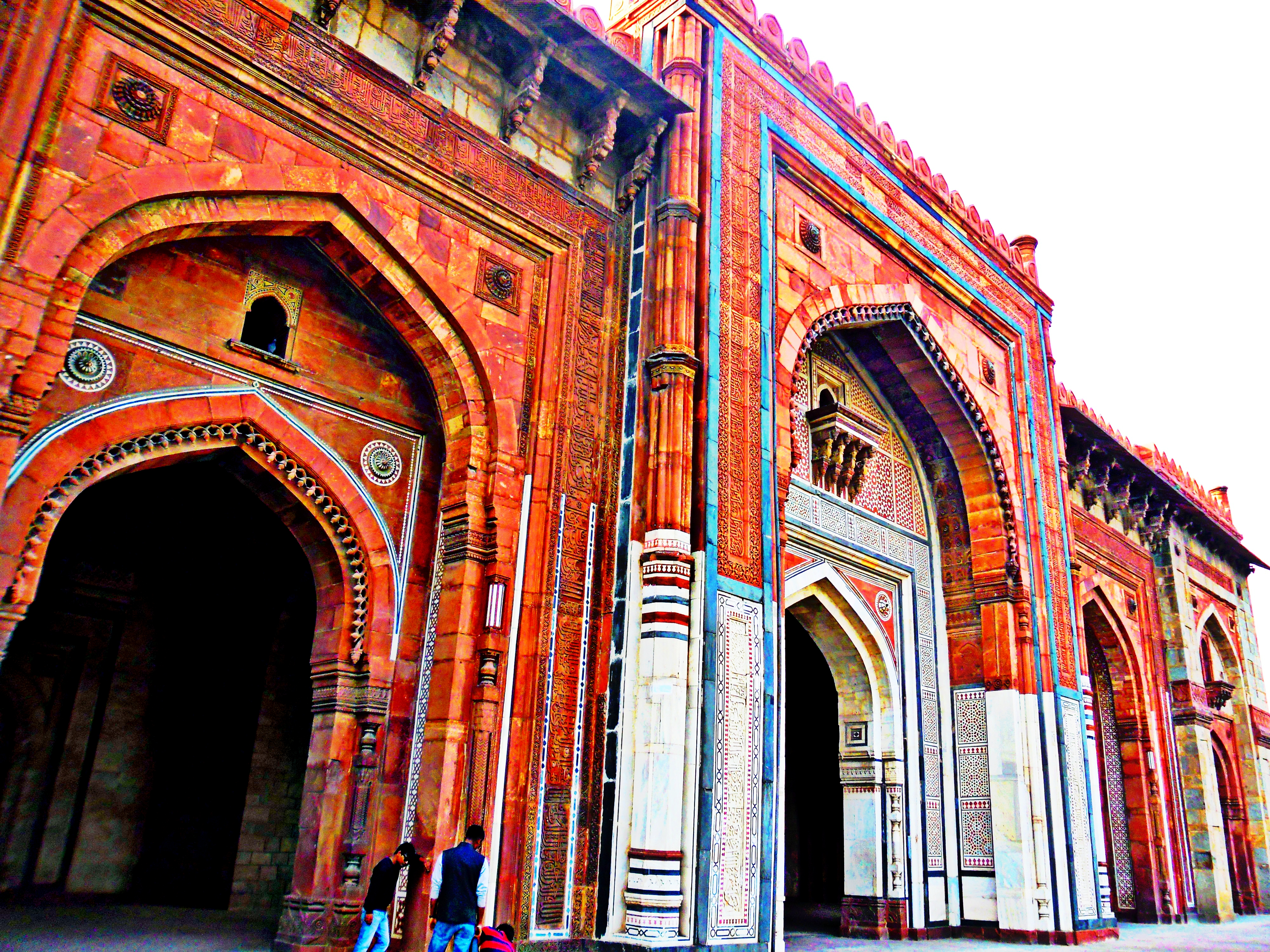
Entrance of mosque

The mosque is built in the Afghan style of a congregational mosque. It is a symbol of the architectural tradition of "a five bay mosque", a concept which was developed during the Sayyid and Lodi dynasties. The mosque lacks any inscription. It is 51 metres (167 ft) wide and 13.5 metres (44 ft) long; and is 20 metres (66 ft) high (which includes the dome). The mosque was built by "core masonry" with stone rubble "bonded with lime mortar". Blocks of quartzite, marble and red sandstone were also used in the construction process. The internal rectilinear hall is laterally divided by five arches. The external facade comprises the same number of arches. The central arch is sunken "in an arched recess" which is contained within a rectangular frontage called liwan. The mosque was intended to be constructed from marble. However, as it ran out of supply, red sandstone had to be used.

From the liwan rises the dome, built in the Lodi style, flanked by small minarets, called guldastas (flower bouquets). The dome on the central bay has a kalash finial on top. There are also "multiple openings" in the "drum" for ventilation and is decorated with intricate tile work. The internal part of the mosque has five mihrabs, one in each bay, corresponding to the external façade. The mihrabs, with alternate dark and light coloured stones, are similar to that of the Atala Masjid in Jaunpur. Flat domes are present on the "penultimate bays". The end bays are oblong in shape but the penultimate ones are square shaped. There are two half arches in the last bay which tangentially spring from the "shoulders of lateral arches", resulting in the creation of three spaces spanned with a cross-rib arrangement. There is a shallow dome in the central space, whereas the eastern and western arcades have semi-domes called "nim-gumbad" which rest on "suspending arches".

Two octagonal turrets are attached to the ends of the rear wall, "which are functional as well as structural".(decorative brackets with oriel windows, sunshades, narrow turrets) are found. The walls are ornamented with hexagonal star motifs which have coloured geometric patterns. The walls are filled with calligraphy. The mosque has two internal staircases located in the end bays. They were used to reach the terrace and the turrets. It also had private entrances on the north and south sides which are currently closed. The mosque also has "cusped entrance arches", a feature common during the reign of Alauddin Khalji.

== In Popular Culture ==
- In 2004, late filmmaker Yash Chopra’s blockbuster Veer-Zaara was shot here. The sequence shot at the Qila-e Kuhna Masjid in Purana Qila saw the film’s protagonists Veer (Shah Rukh Khan) and Zaara (Preity Zinta) bid farewell to each other. It also appeared in song "Do Pal".

== Gallery ==
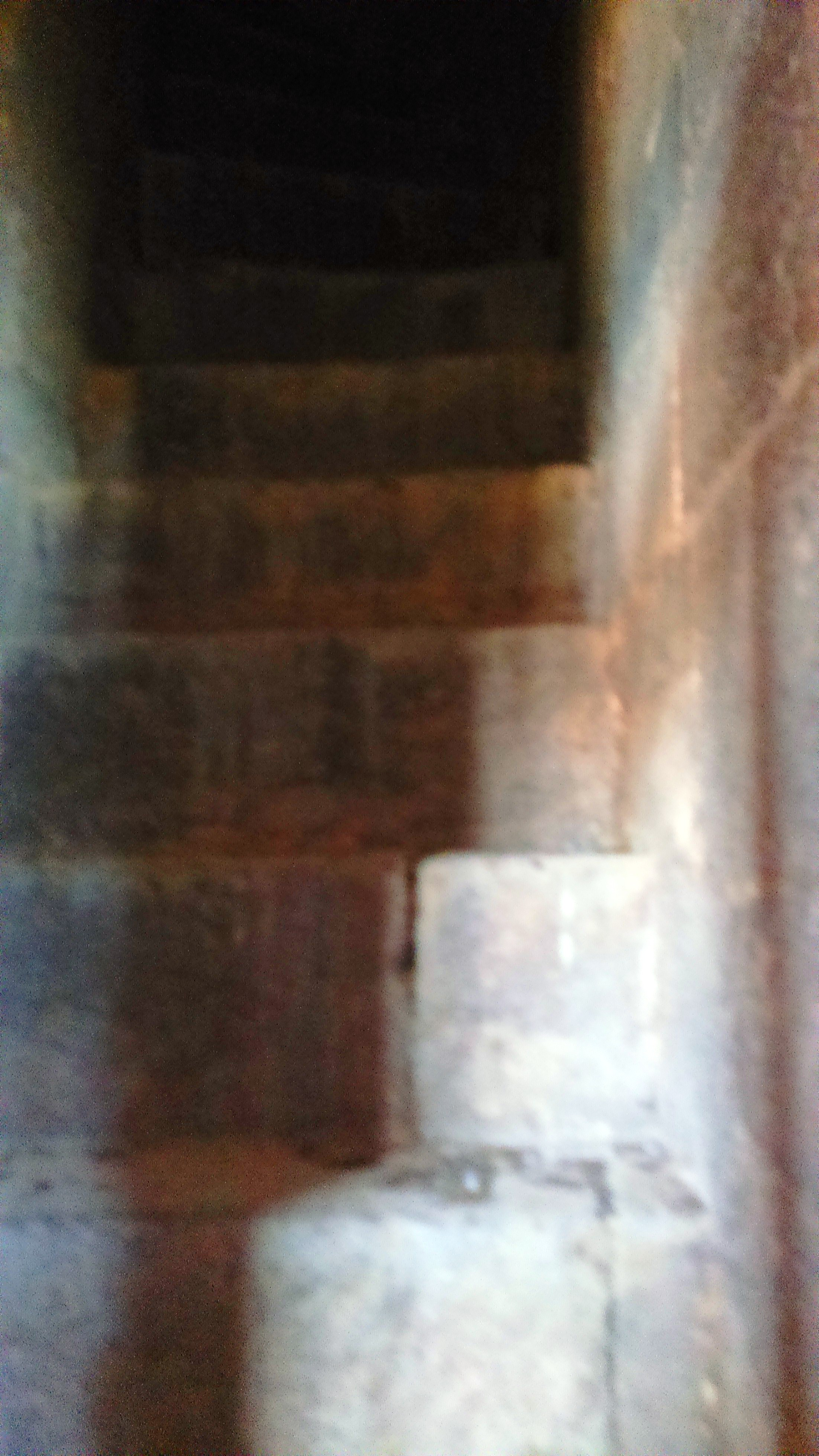
Stairs of the mosque

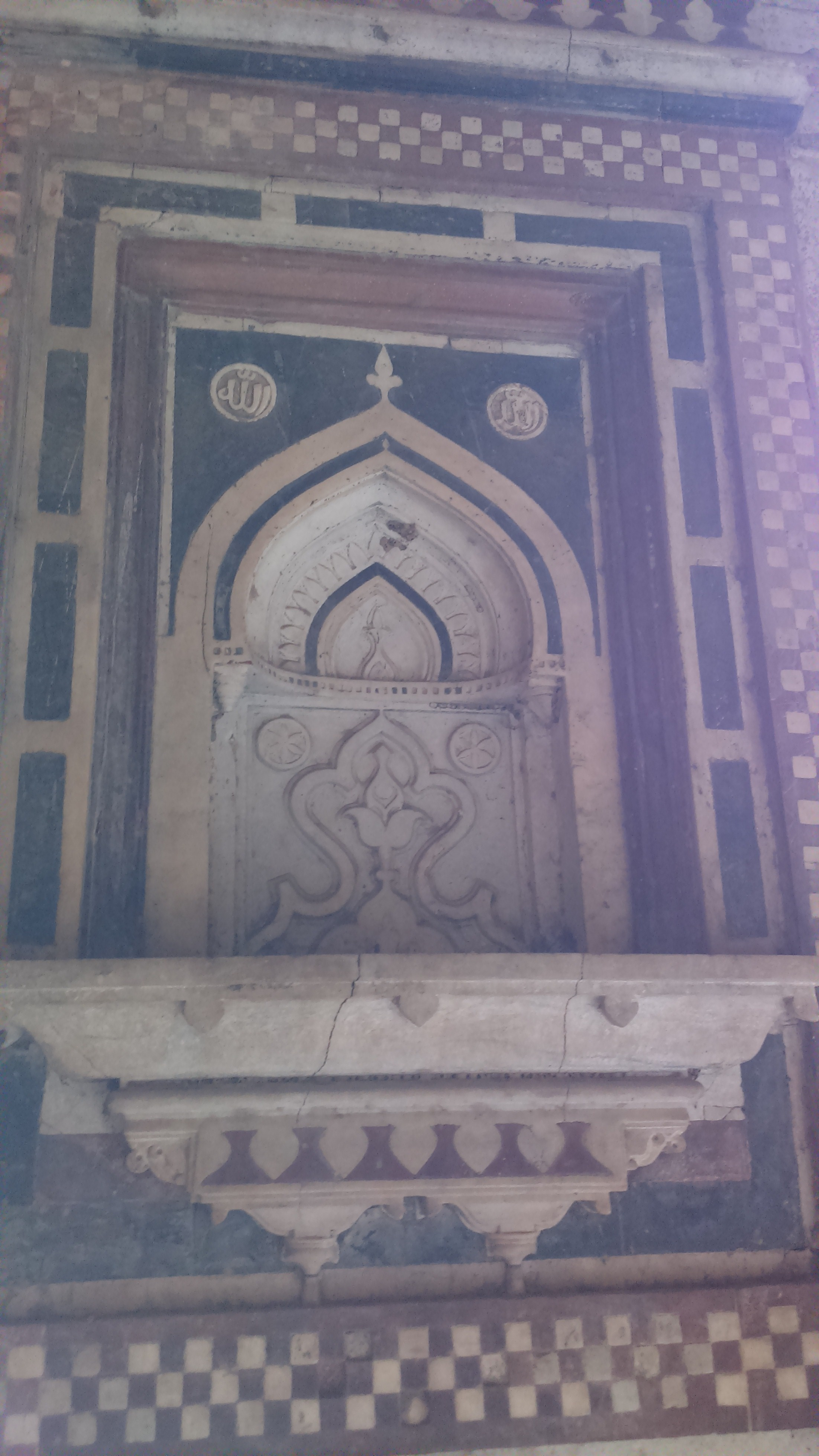
A wall work in the mosque

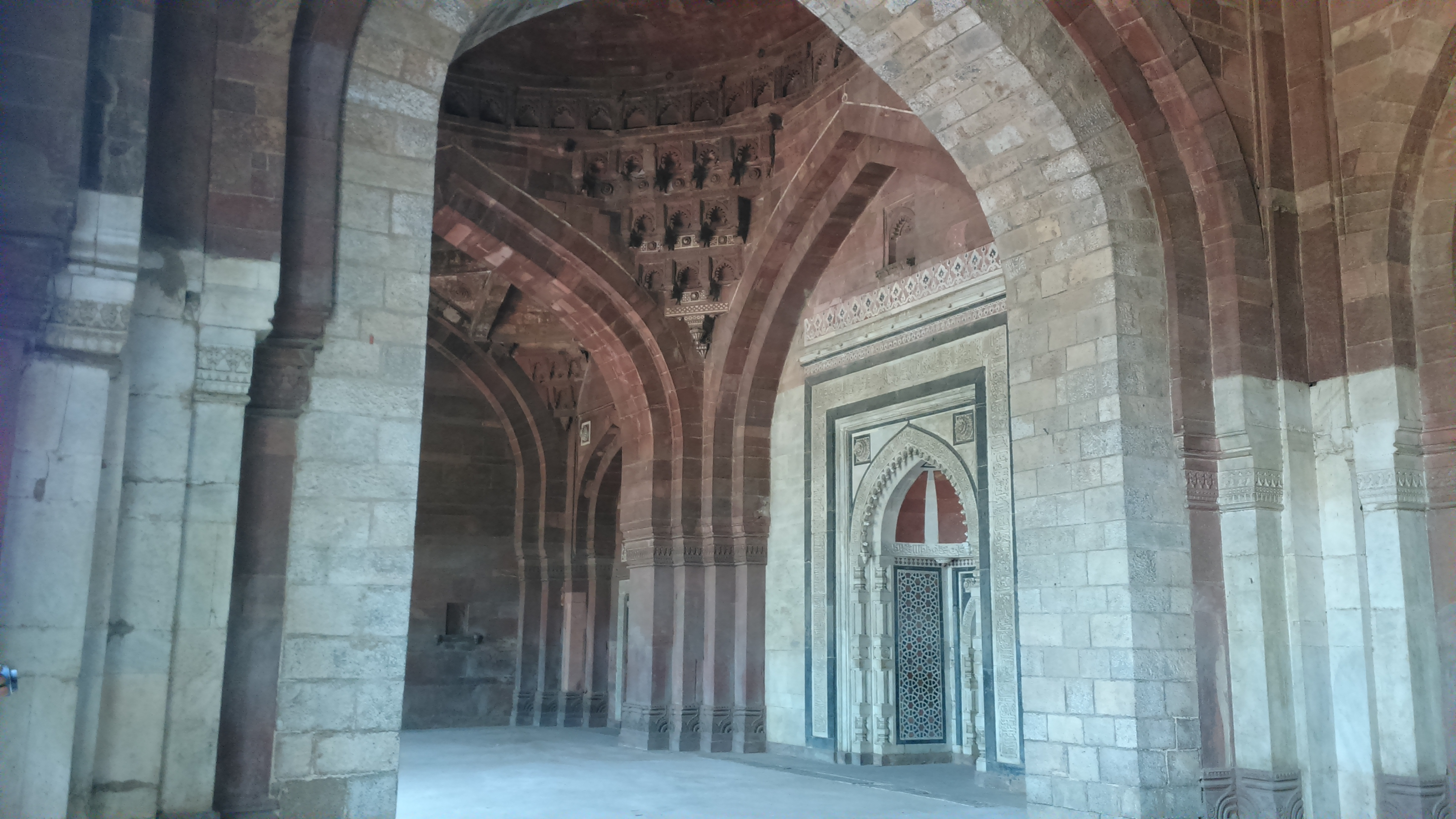
Prayer hall of the mosque

== See also ==
- Islam in India
- List of mosques in India
- List of Monuments of National Importance in Delhi
