= Purana Qila =

Historic fort in Delhi, India

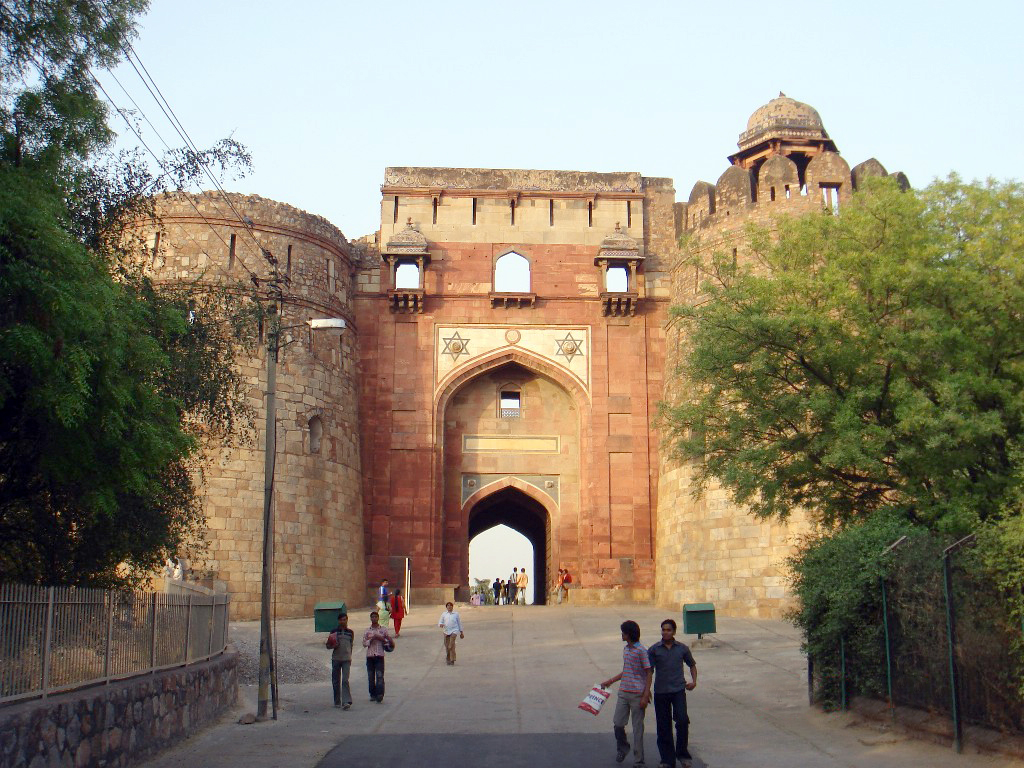
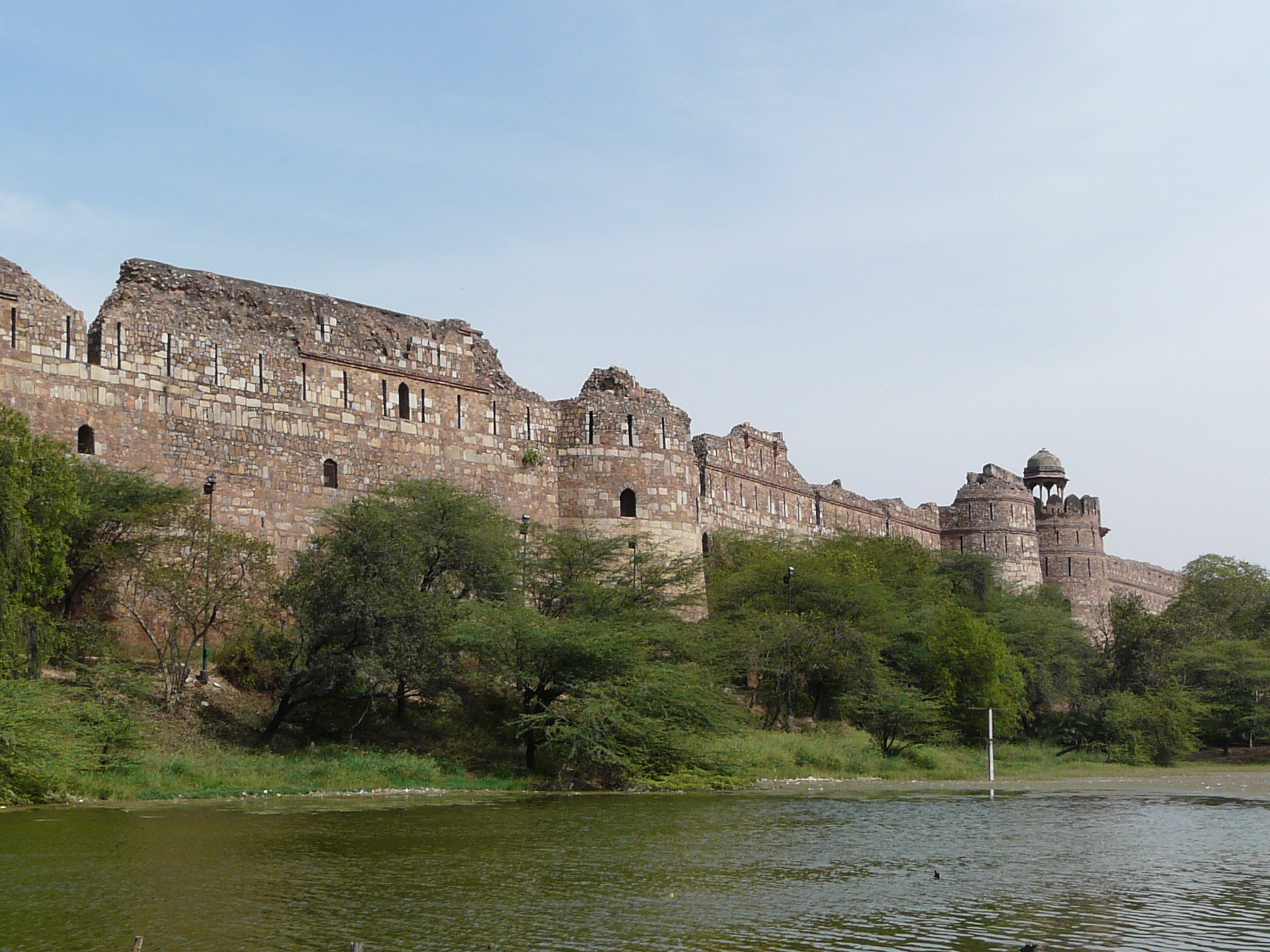

- Purana Qila in Delhi
- 28°36′34″N 77°14′39″E
- Location: Delhi, India

History
- Founded: 1538; 488 years ago
- Founder: Humayun, Mughal Sultan; Sher Shah Suri, Surid Sultan
- Original use: Fortress

Purana Qila (lit. 'Old Fort') is one of the oldest forts in Delhi, India. India's Ministry of Culture identifies Purana Qila as the ancient city of Indraprastha. The present fort was built by the second Mughal Emperor Humayun and Surid Sultan Sher Shah Suri. The fort forms the inner citadel of the city of Dinpanah. It is located near the expansive Pragati Maidan exhibition ground and is separated from Dhyanchand Stadium by Mathura Road, Delhi.

== History ==
=== Pre-Islamic habitation and Indraprastha theory ===
Excavations point to traces and continued habitation from the 1000 BC, during the Painted Grey Ware period. The first two rounds of excavations – in 1954–55 and 1969–72 – by B. B. Lal, then director of the Archaeological Survey of India (ASI), had unearthed traces of Painted Grey Ware culture. Historian Alexander Cunningham identified the fort with that of Indraprastha, though he referred to the present structure as built by Muslim rulers. Even till the early part of the 20th century, Purana Qila was known as Pandavon Ka Qila (Pandava's fort) and the entire complex as Indraprastha village. It must be remembered that coordinating material archaeological culture with literary and bardic literature is methodologically almost always impossible.

=== Dinpanah ===
The origins of the Purana Qila lie in the walls of Dinpanah, the new city of Delhi was being constructed by Mughal emperor Humayun, in the general vicinity of the ancient Indraprastha ruins. Abul Fazl stated that he built the fort in the place of that of ancient Indraprastha. The founder of the Sur Empire, Sher Shah Suri, defeated Humayun and made changes to the fort, strengthening its fortifications and completing its walls. He also had another fort built there called Shergarh, where the governor resided. His project, however, was a continuation of Humayun's construction of a citadel for a royal city. He also built many structures inside the fort. Additions to the fort have been believed to have been made even after his rule. The extent of his contribution to the fort's construction is disputed. The historical attribution of its construction is also uncertain judging from primary sources. Muhammad Khwandamir said that Humayun laid the foundation of the city on a mound near Yamuna. The construction of the walls and fortifications were almost finished by Humayun's time. Tarikh-i-Da'udi states that Sher Shah Suri's royal city remained incomplete upon his death and he had named his fort Shergarh. Abbas Sarwani states the two forts being constructed by him were incomplete when he died. Tarikh-i-Khan-Jahan states that Salim Shah Suri had constructed a wall defending Dinpanah of Humayun.

Purana Qila and its environs flourished as the "sixth city of Delhi". On 7 October 1556 Hindu king Hem Chandra Vikramaditya, who had defeated Akbar's forces at Battle of Delhi (1556) was crowned in Purana Qila. The Mughals would one month later decisively defeat Hemu and his army at the second battle of Panipat.

=== British Era ===
Edwin Lutyens who designed the new capital of British India, New Delhi, in the 1920s, had aligned the central vista, now Rajpath, with Purana Qila. During the Partition of India, in August 1947 the Purana Qila along with the neighbouring Humayun's Tomb, became the site for refuge camps for Muslims migrating to newly founded Pakistan. This included over 12,000 government employees who had opted for service in Pakistan, and between 150,000–200,000 Muslim refugees, who swarmed inside Purana Qila by September 1947, when Indian government took over the management of the two camps. The Purana Qila camp remained functional until early 1948, as the trains to Pakistan waited until October 1947 to start.

=== World War II ===
During the Asia-Pacific War (1941–1945), over 2000 Japanese civilians were interned in British India, of whom around 554 were women and 224 children. Plans to intern Japanese living in British India, along with surveillance of persons of interest, were put into place from as early as July 1940, with preparations to open internment camps made from at least February 1941. After war broke out between Japan and the Allies later that year, Japanese civilians in India, along with those of other now-enemy nations, were joined in internment by civilians from various British colonial territories, including Malaya and Singapore. Two key civilian internment camps in India were Purana Qila, the Old Fort, in Delhi, and Deoli in the deserts of Rajputana.

The fate of the Japanese in India threw a shadow over the whole business, and the British believed, with some justification, that the ill-treatment of Allied prisoners of war was a reprisal for this. By December 1942, there were 2,115 Japanese internees, the vast majority from Singapore, in Purana Quila camp outside Delhi. They were housed in tents that gave little protection from the cold in winter, or from temperatures that rose to 120 degrees in summer. The Japanese government protested that the food and the cooking, washing and sanitation facilities were inadequate. The British dismissed this: the Japanese were `notoriously unable to cope with extremes of heat or cold'. (`Treatment of Japanese internees in India', 1z December 1942, F09,6/ 477, PRO.)`According to Asiatic standards', officials observed, the rations were `adequate for proper nourishment'.( R. N. Gilchrist to under secretary of state, Foreign Office, 19 October 1942, ibid)

=== Recent years ===
In the 1970s, the ramparts of Purana Qila were first used as a backdrop for theatre, when three productions of the National School of Drama were staged here: Tughlaq, Andha Yug and Sultan Razia, directed by Ebrahim Alkazi. In later decades it has been the venue of various important theatre productions, cultural events, and concerts. Today, it is the venue of a daily sound and light presentation after sunset, on the history of the "Seven Cities of Delhi", from Indraprastha through New Delhi.

== Excavations ==
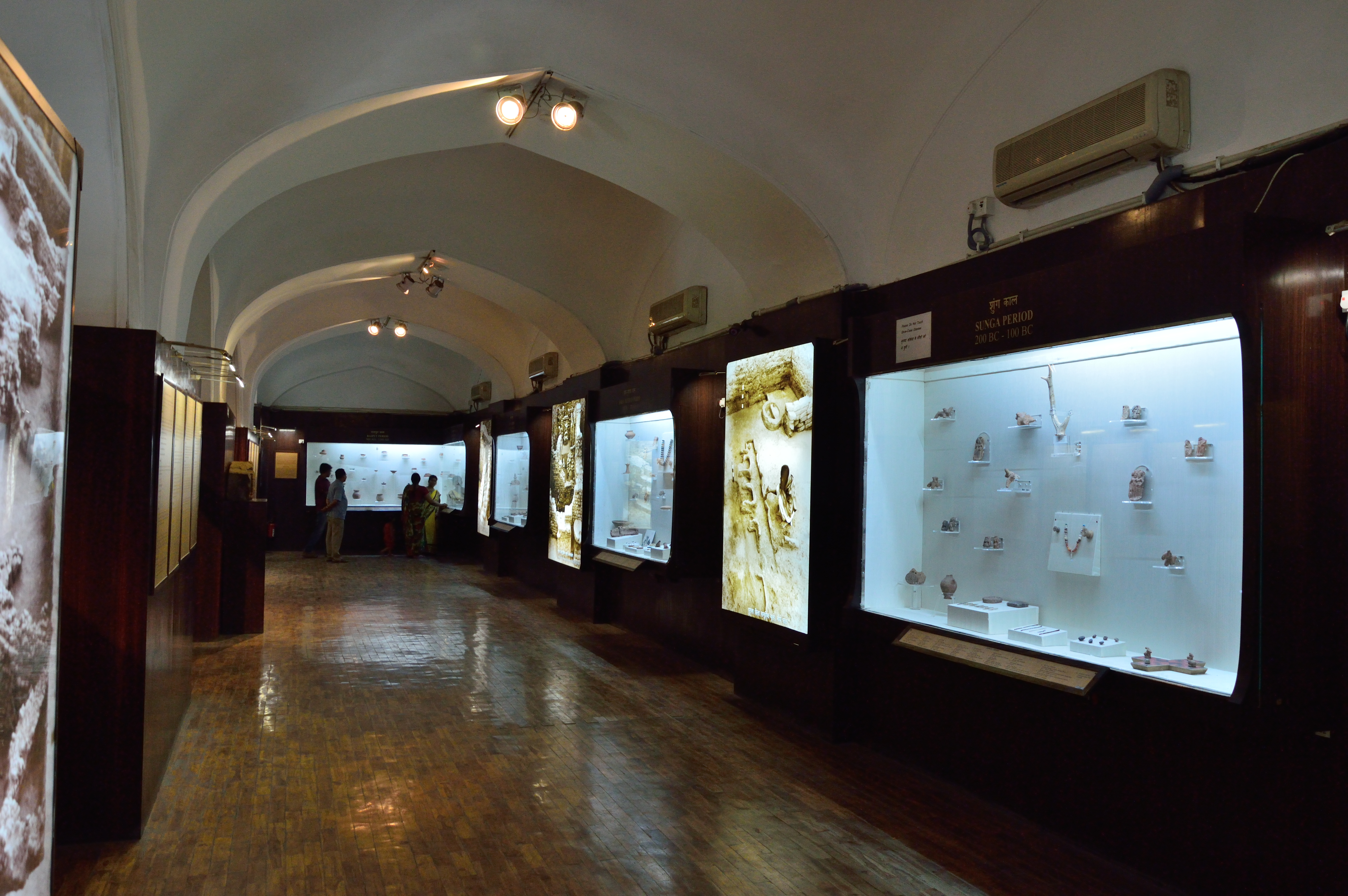
Archaeological Museum

Archaeological Survey of India (ASI) carried out excavations at Purana Qila in 1954–55 and again from 1969 to 1973 by B. B. Lal, and in 2013-14 & 2017-18 by Vasant Kumar Swarnkar. its findings and artefacts are exhibited at the Archaeological Museum, Purana Qila. This includes Painted Grey Ware, dating 1000 BC, and various objects and pottery signifying continuous habitation from Mauryan to Shunga, Kushana, Gupta, Rajput, Delhi Sultanate and Mughal periods. The homes built during the Rajput era were built of bricks used in other structures and also mud bricks. A fortification wall about 30 metre long was also found. During the Delhi Suntanate, structures were made from re-used bricks and over the ruins of earlier structures. The Mughal era structures were characterized by a deep pit dug over those of the preceding eras. The excavations revealed three structural phases from Mughal era, including structures consisting of re-used bricks, rubble and lakhori bricks. ASI began another excavation at Purana Qila in January 2023. By June, early Kushan structures had been exposed at a depth of 5.5 metres (18 ft); finds included a stone image of Vaikuntha Vishnu, a terracotta plaque of Gaja Lakshmi and a bone needle.

== Physical features ==
The walls of the fort rise to a height of 18 metres, traverse about 1.5 km, and have three arched gateways: the Bara Darwaza (Big Gate) facing west, which is still in use today; the south gate, also popularly known as the 'Humayun Gate' (probably so known because it was constructed by Humayun, or perhaps because Humayun's Tomb is visible from there); and lastly, the 'Talaqi Gate', often known as the "forbidden gate". All the gates are double-storeyed sandstone structures flanked by two huge semi-circular bastion towers, decorated with white and coloured-marble inlays and blue tiles. They are replete with detailing, including ornate overhanging balconies, or jharokhas, and are topped by pillared pavilions (chhatris), all features that are reminiscent of Rajasthani architecture as seen in the North and South Gates, and which were amply repeated in future Mughal architecture. Despite the grandeurs of the exterior, few of interior structures have survived except the Qila-i Kuhna Mosque and the Shermandal, both credited to Sher Shah.

=== Qila-i-Kuhna Mosque ===
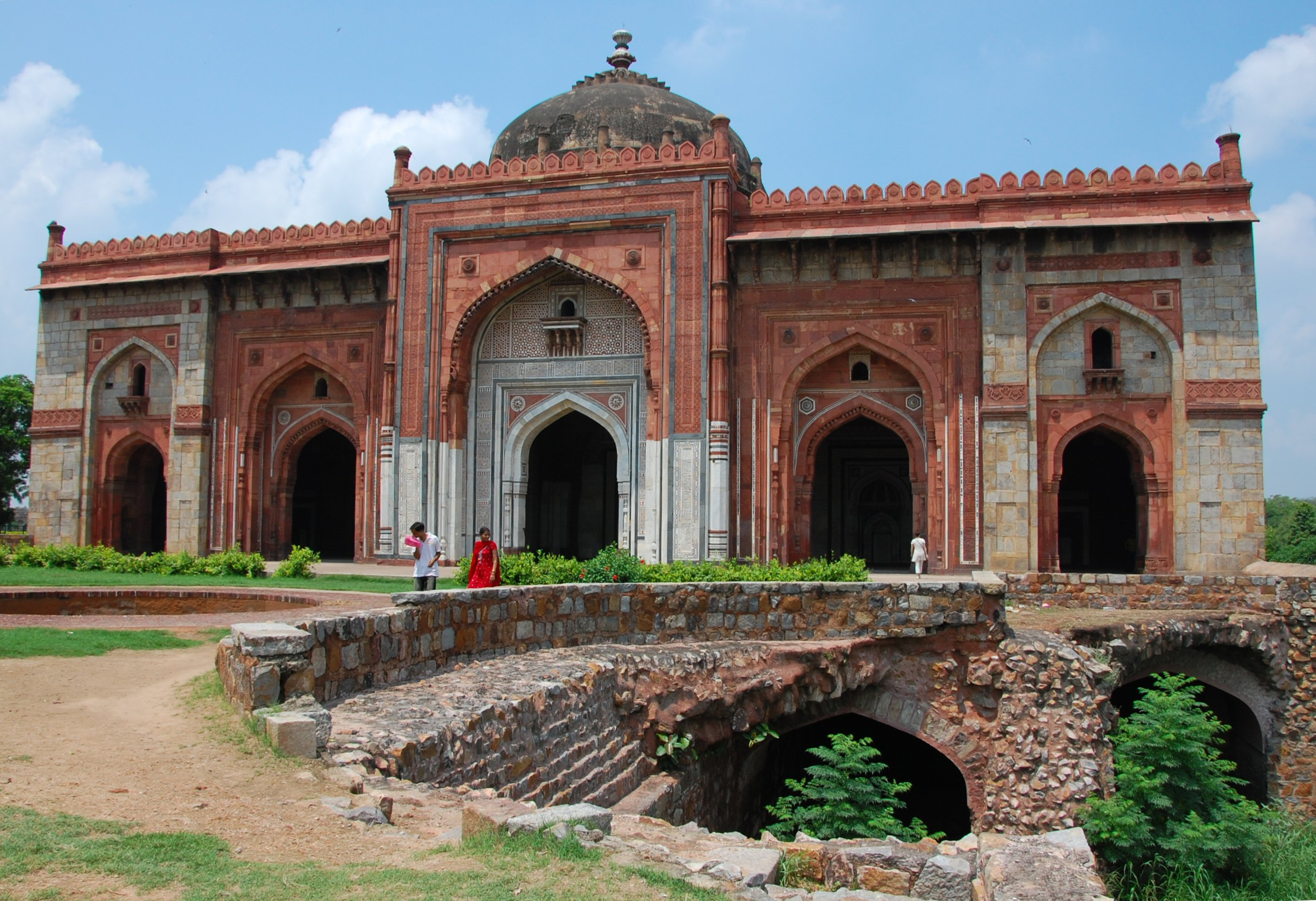
Qila Kuhna Masjid inside Purana Qila

The single-domed Qila-i-Kuhna Mosque, built by Sher Shah in 1541 is an excellent example of a pre-Mughal design and an early example of the extensive use of the pointed arch in the region as seen in its five doorways with the 'true' horseshoe-shaped arches. It was designed as a Jami Mosque or Friday mosque for the Sultan and his courtiers. The prayer hall inside, the single-aisled mosque, measures 51.20m by 14.90m and has five elegant arched prayer niches or mihrabs set in its western wall. Marble in shades of red, white and slate is used for the calligraphic inscriptions on the central iwan, marks a transition from Lodhi to Mughal architecture. At one time, the courtyard had a shallow tank, with a fountain.

A second storey, accessed through staircases from the prayer hall, with a narrow passage running along the rectangular hall, provided space for female courtiers to pray, while the arched doorway on the left wall, framed by ornate jharokas, was reserved for members of the royal family. On a marble slab within the mosque an inscription reads: "As long as there are people on the earth, may this edifice be frequented and people be happy and cheerful in it". Today it is the best preserved building in Purana Qila.

=== Sher Mandal ===
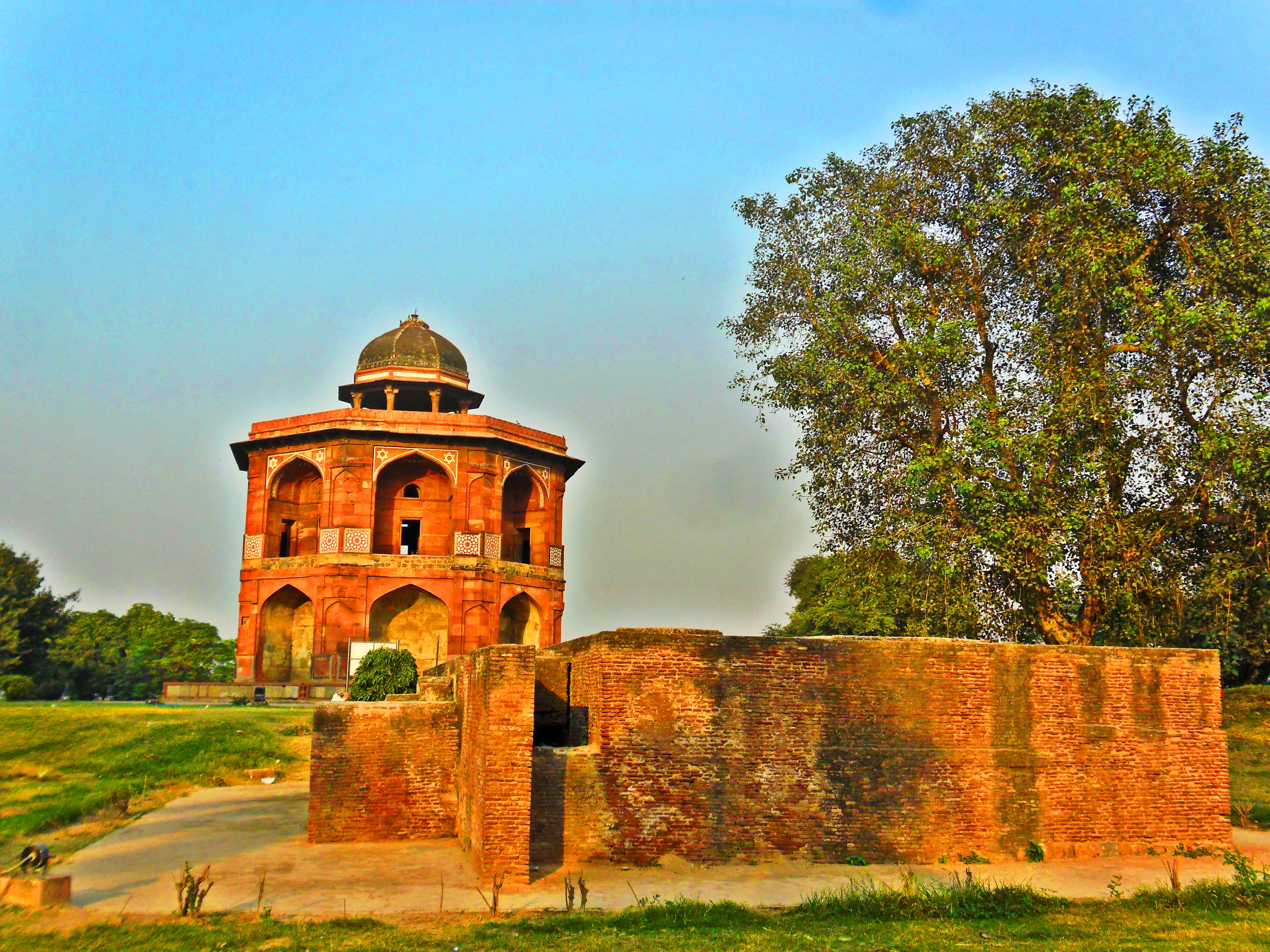
Old Fort Humayun's private library(Sher Mandal) Purana Qila and Hammam

The Sher Mandal named for Farid (Sher Shah) who had tried to finish what was ordered by Babur but had died during the initial phase and so construction was halted until the arrival of Humayun.

This double-storeyed octagonal tower of red sandstone with steep stairs leading up to the roof was intended to be higher than its existing height. Its original builder was Babur who ordered the construction and was used as a personal observatory and library for his son Humayun, finished only after he recaptured the fort. It is also one of the first observatories of Delhi, the earliest being in Pir Ghaib at Hindu Rao at Ridge built in the 14th century by Firoz Shah Tughlaq. The tower is topped by an octagonal chhatri supported by eight pillars and decorated with white marble in typical Mughal style.

Inside, there are remnants of the decorative plaster-work and traces of stone-shelving where, presumably, the emperor's books were placed.

This was also the spot where, on 24 January 1556 Humayun fell from the second floor to his death. He slipped while hastening to the evening prayers, following his hobby of astronomical star gazing at the top of this private observatory. He fell headlong down the stairs and died of his injuries two days later. Entry inside the library is now prohibited.

=== Outlying monuments ===
Several other monuments are strewn around the complex, like Kairul Manzil, mosque built by Maham Anga, Akbar's foster-mother, and which was later used as a madrasa. Sher Shah Suri Gate or Lal Darwaza, which was the southern gate to Shergarh, also lies opposite the Purana Qila complex, across Mathura Road, south-east of the Kairul Manzil.

== Gallery ==
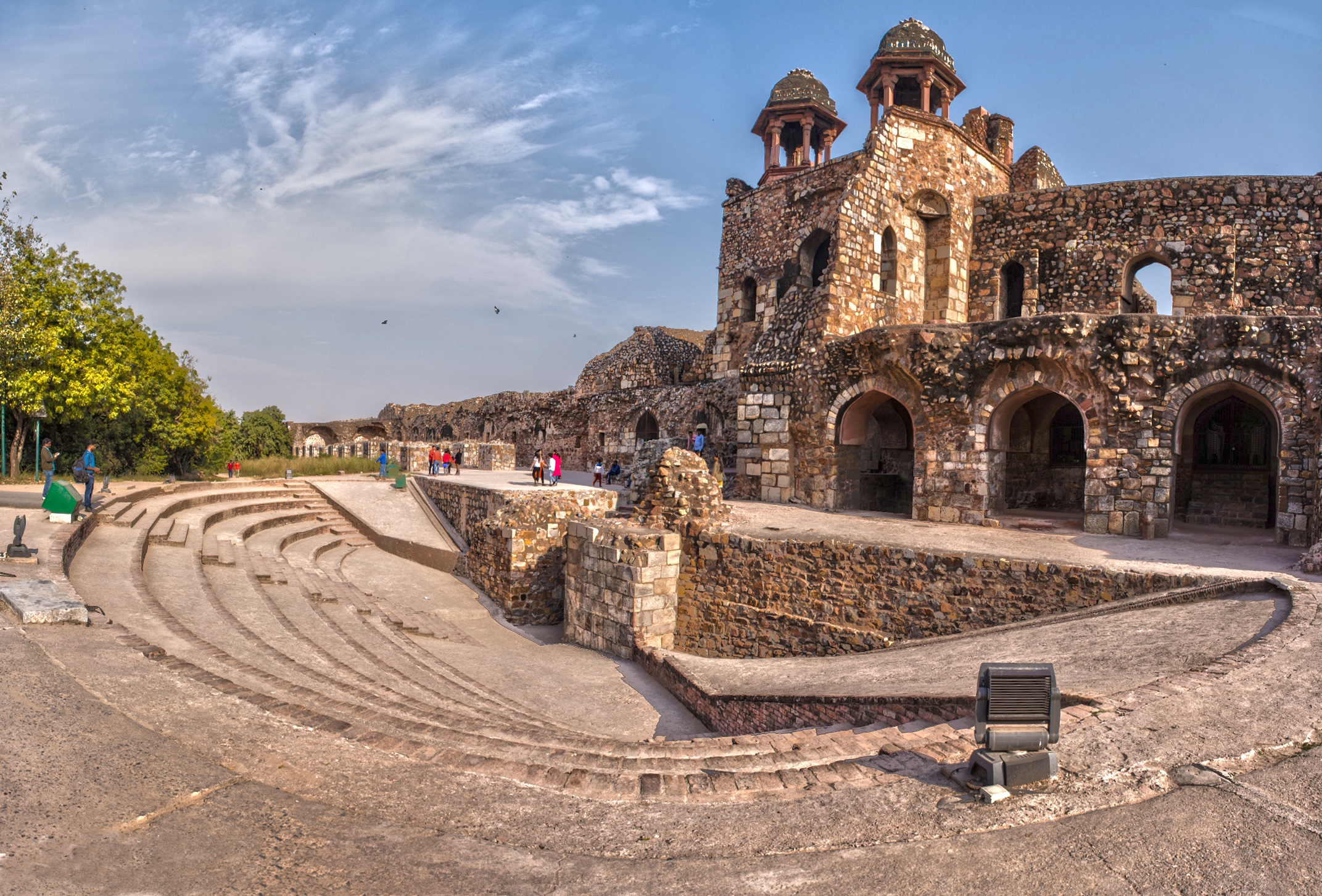
Humayun Gate

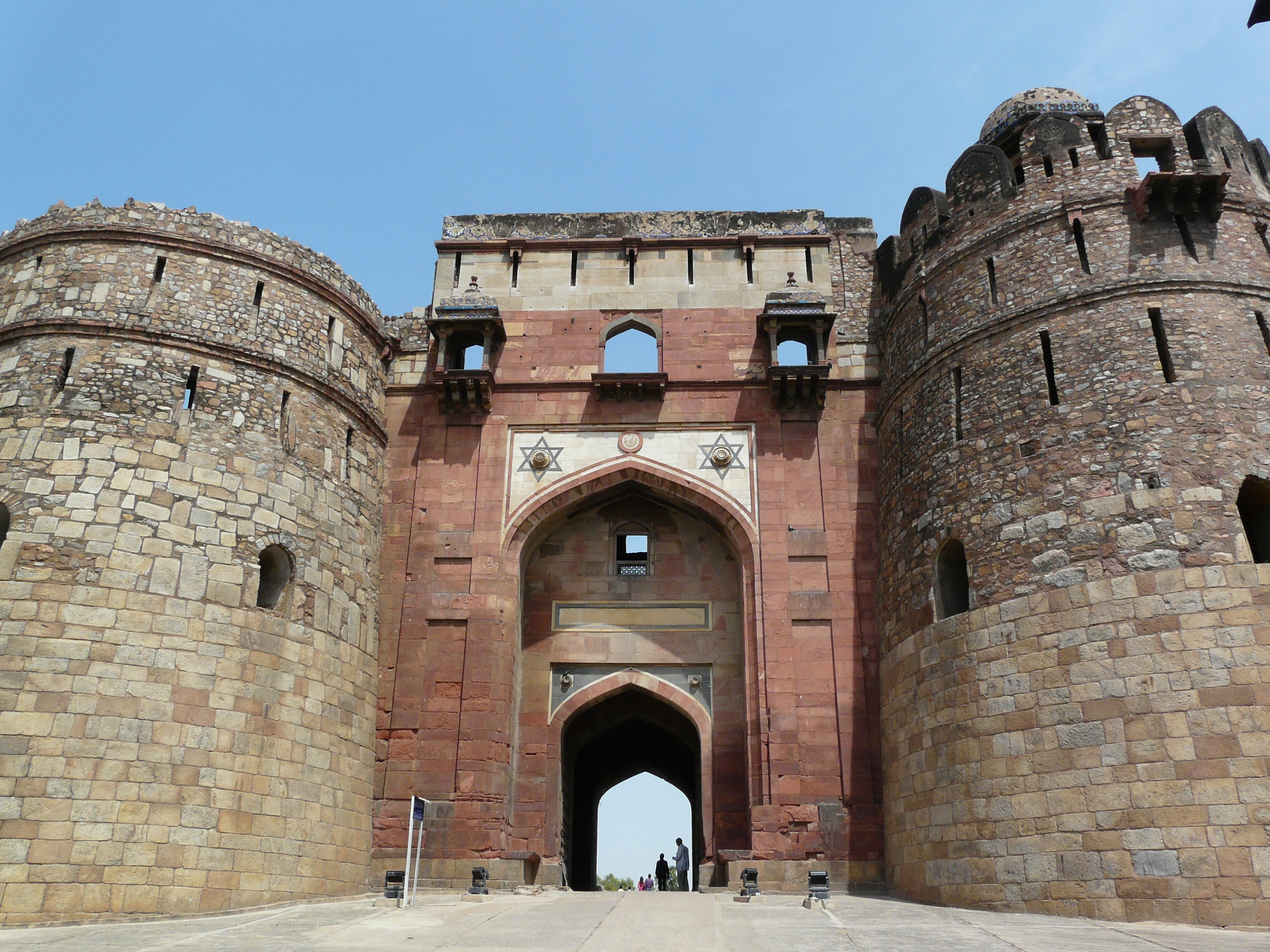
West Gate, 'Bara Darwaza', present main Entrance, with its bastion

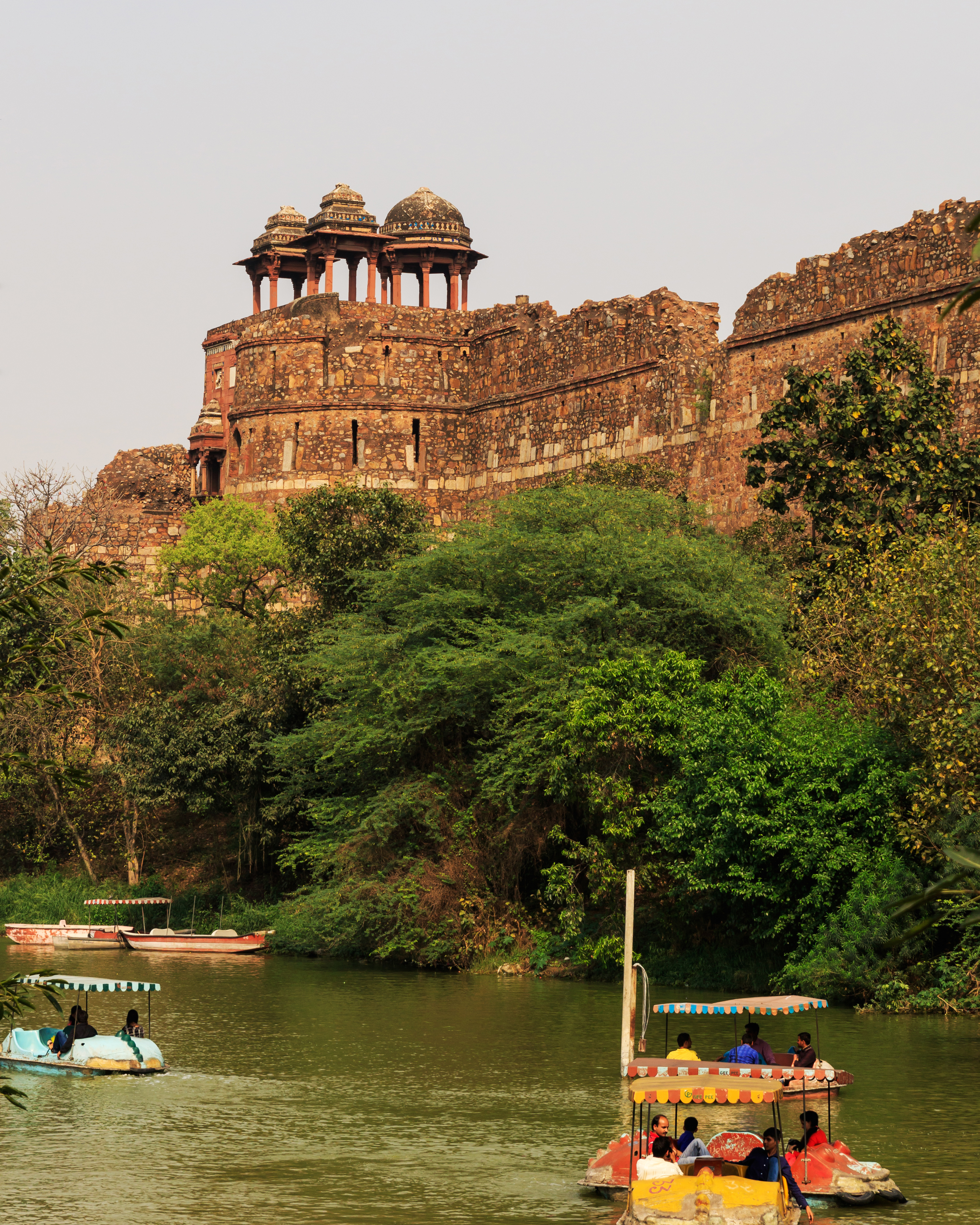
Lake outside Purana Qila

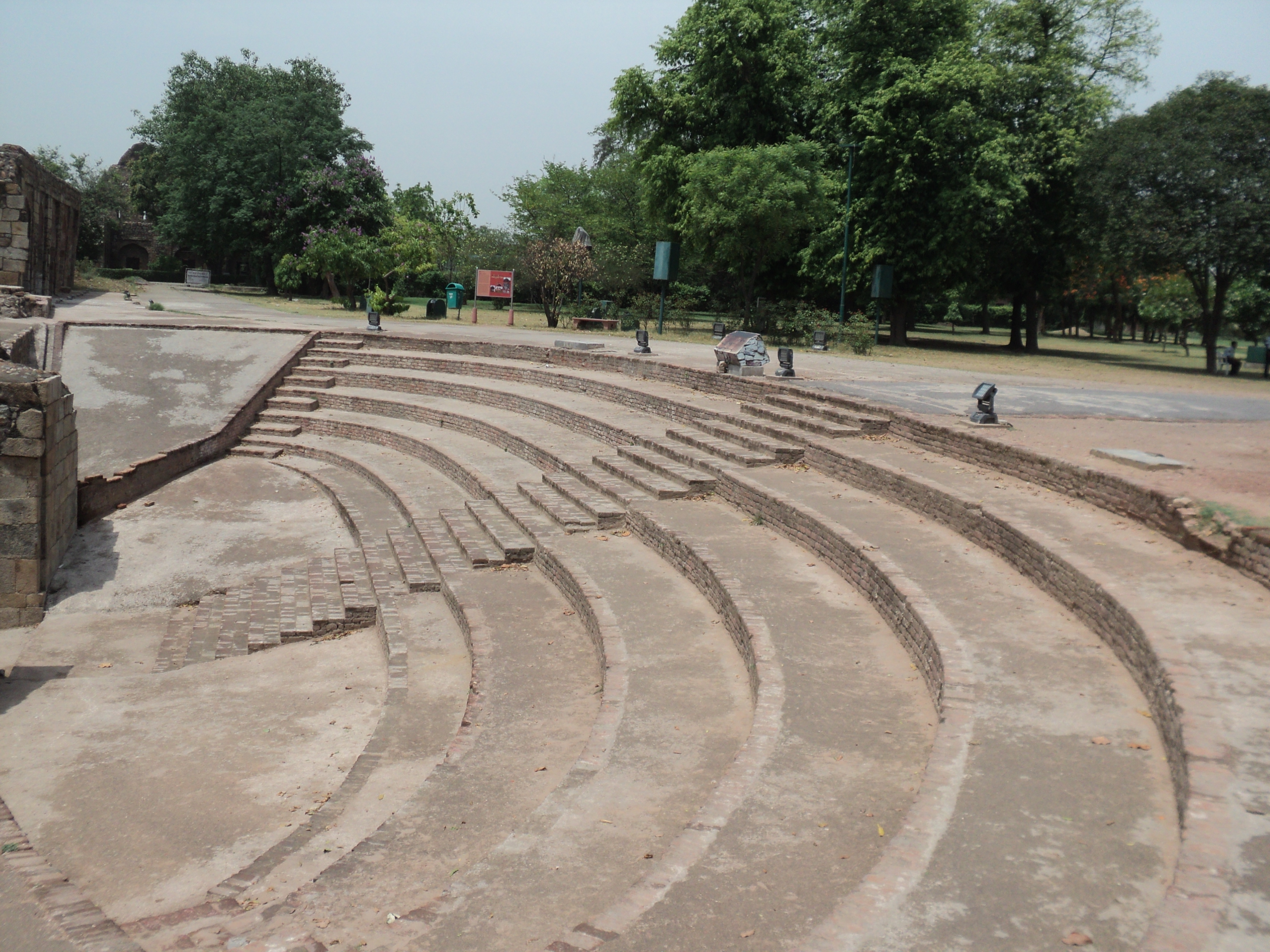
Remains of large outer walls

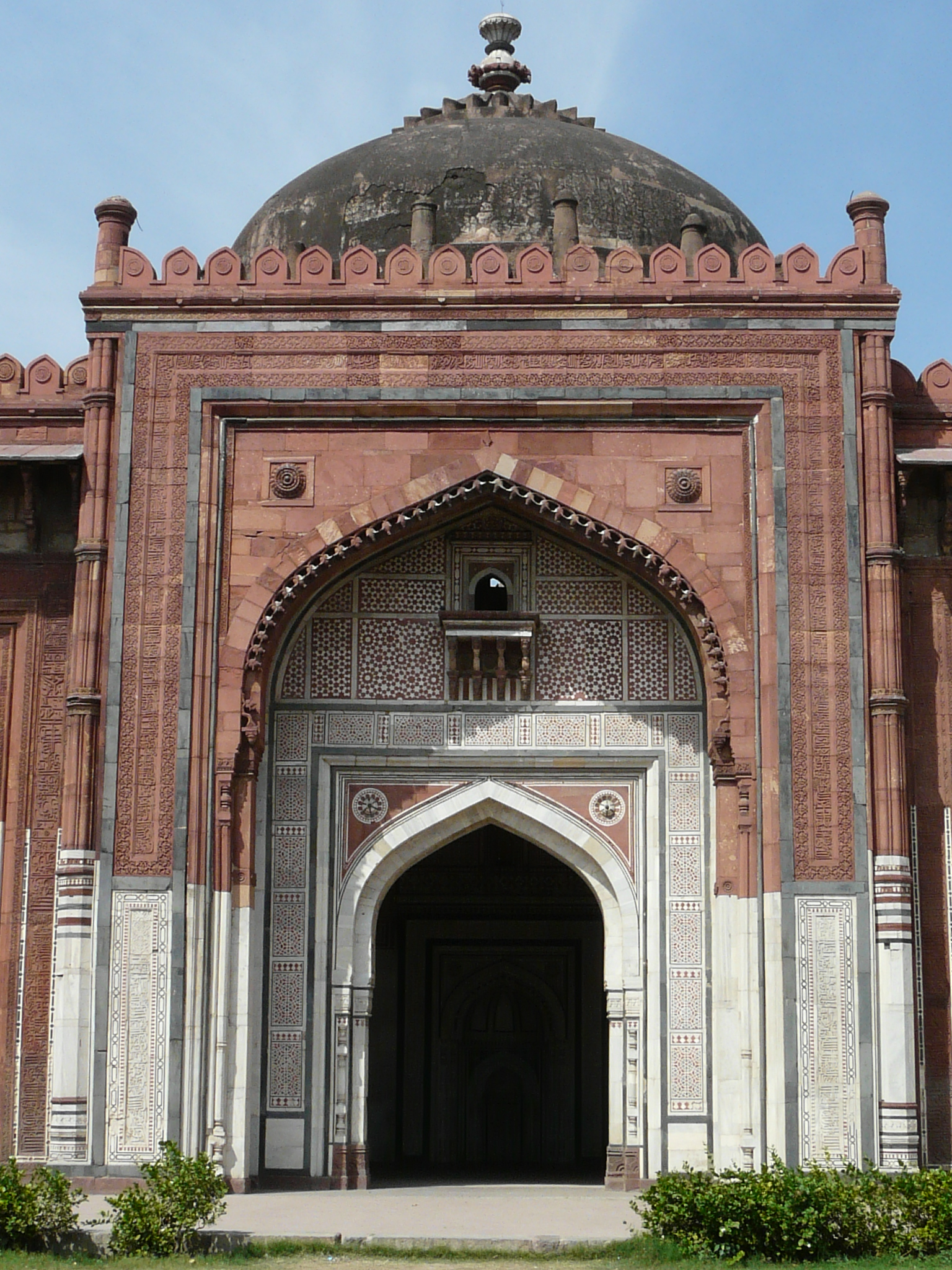
Qila-i-Kuhna Mosque 'Peshtak' (Entrance Arch)

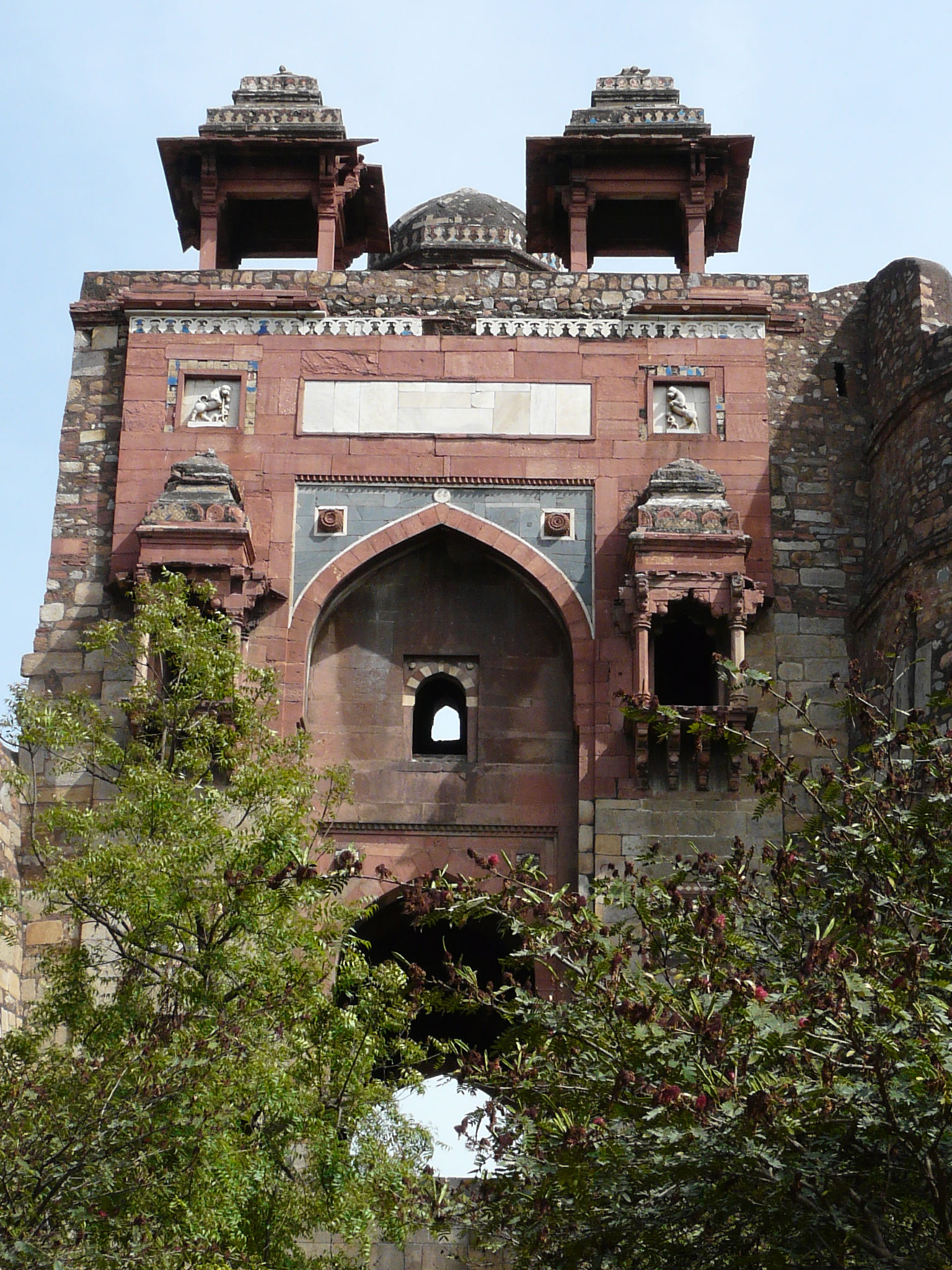
North Gate, or Talaqi Darwaza

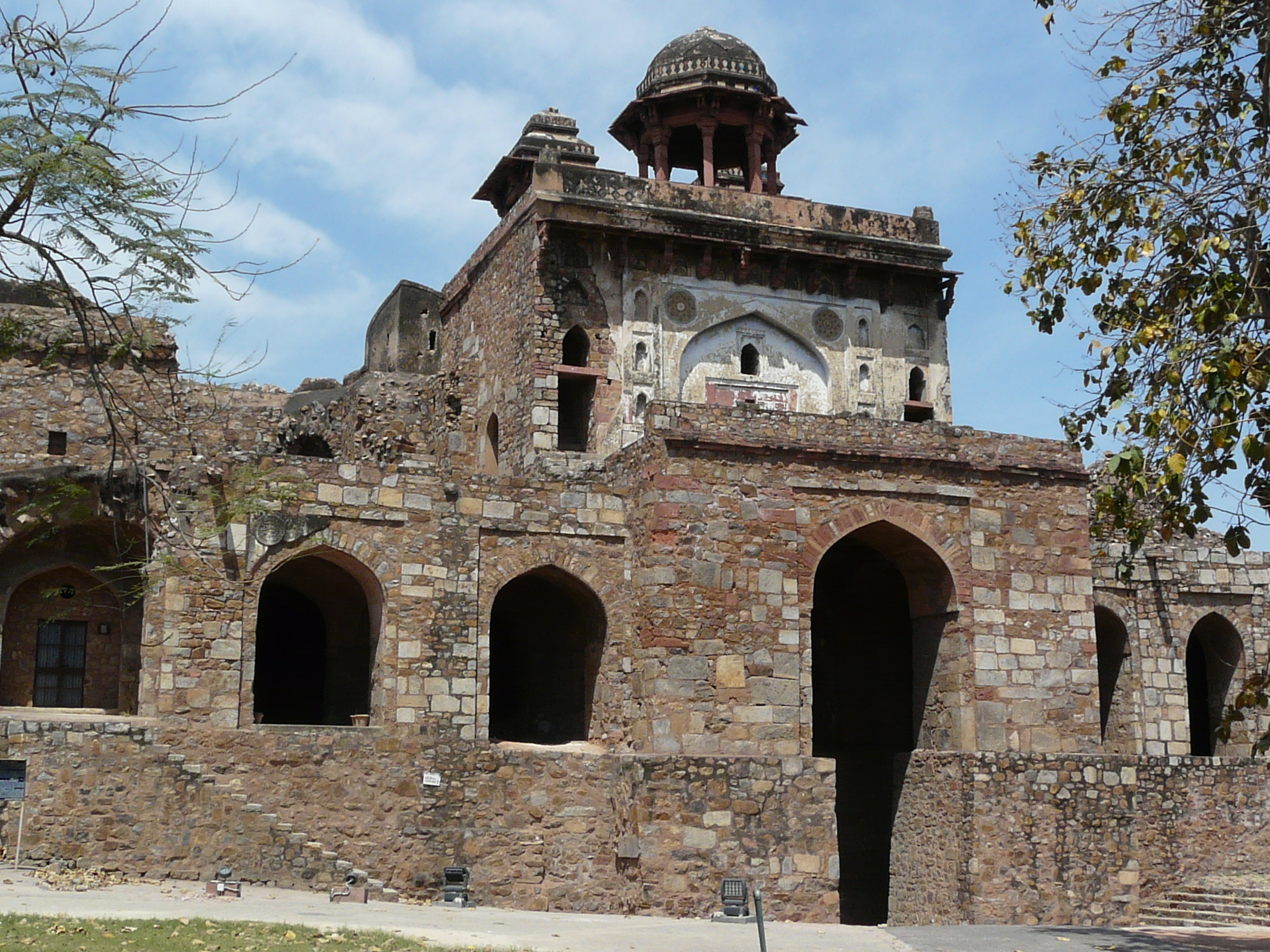
North Gate interior

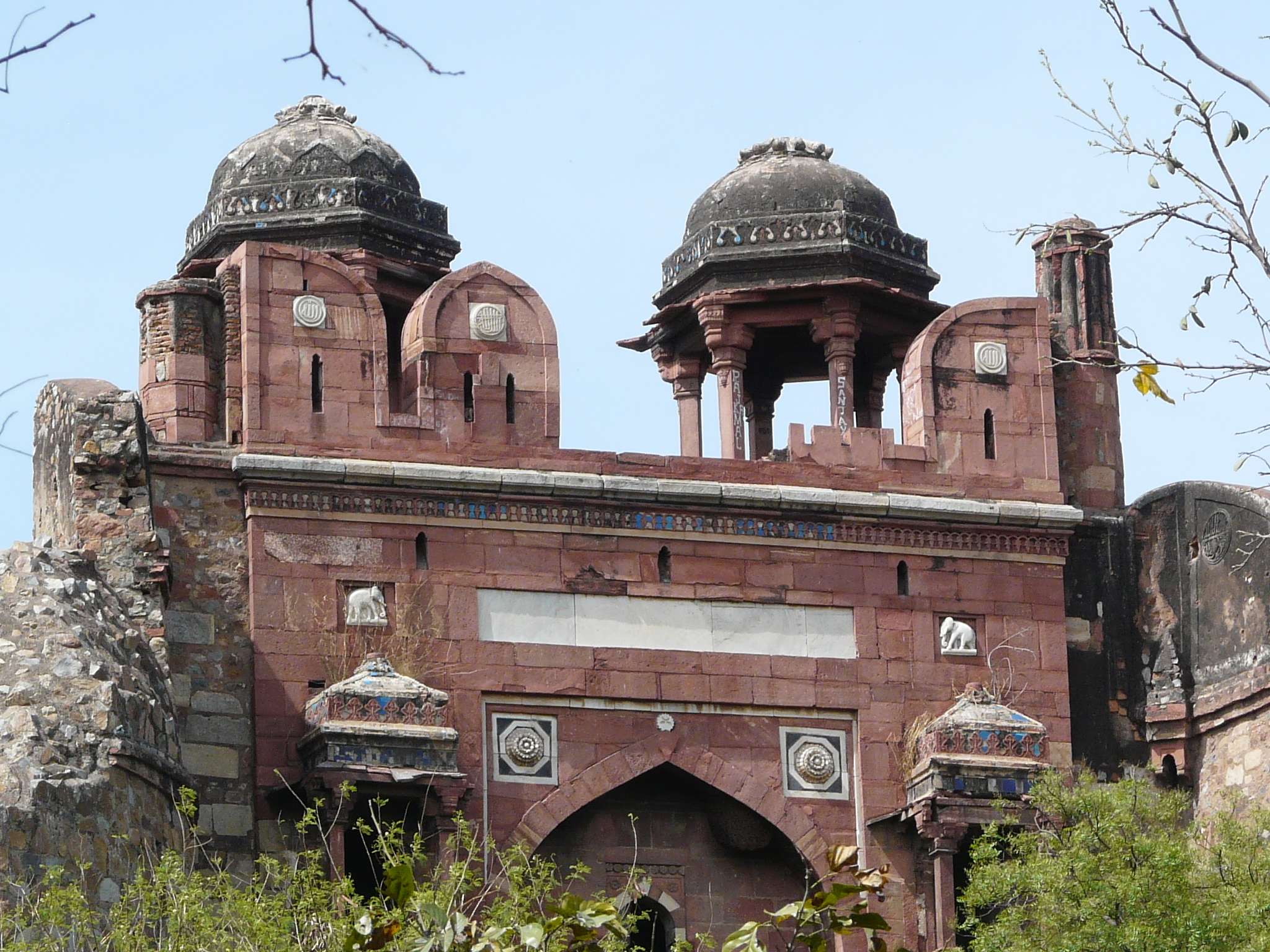
South Gate, as seen from adjacent Delhi Zoo

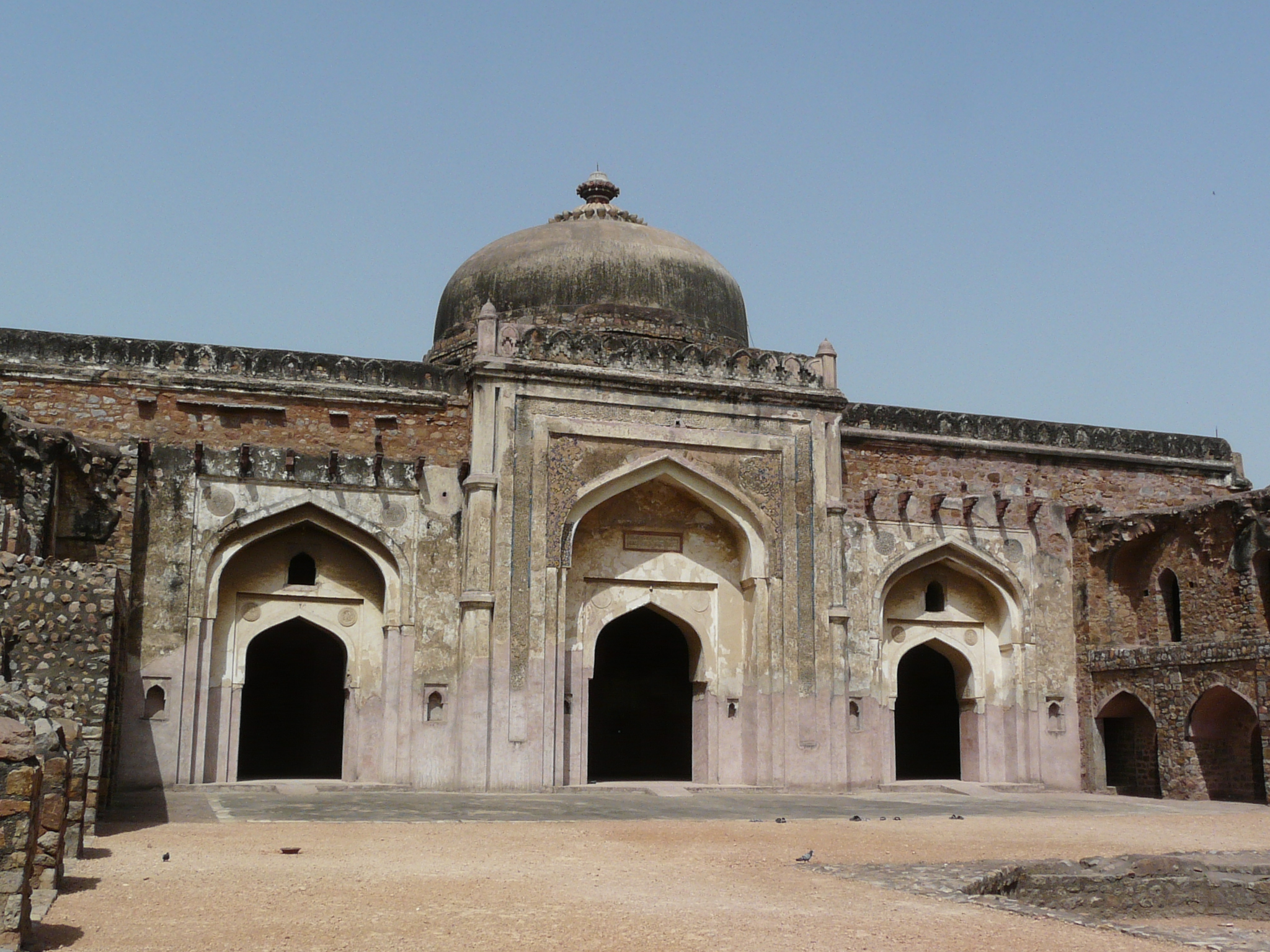
Khairul Manzil, a mosque and later a madrasa built by Maham Anga, stands opposite Purana Qila.

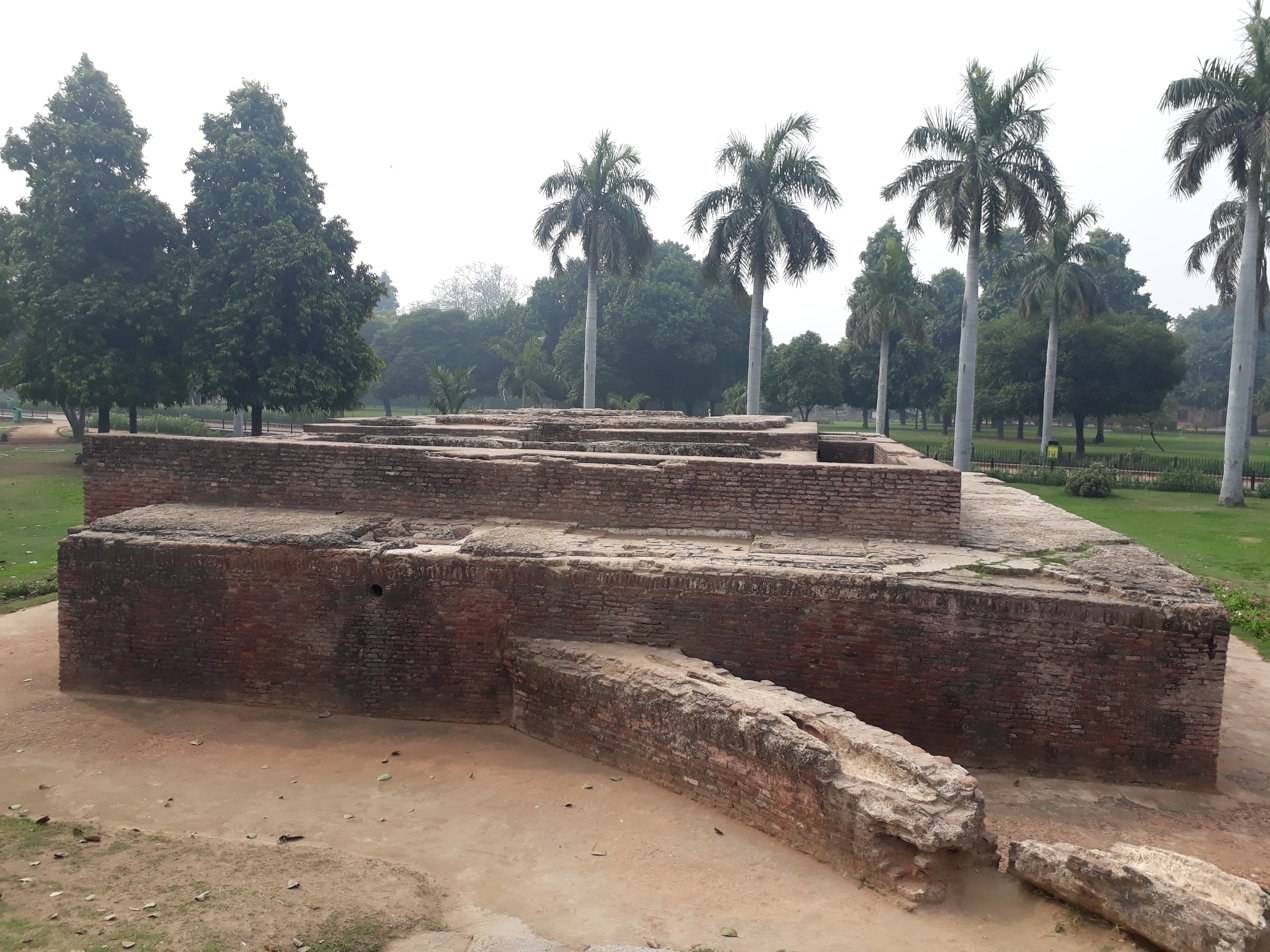
Hammam Khana (Bath House) in Purana Qila

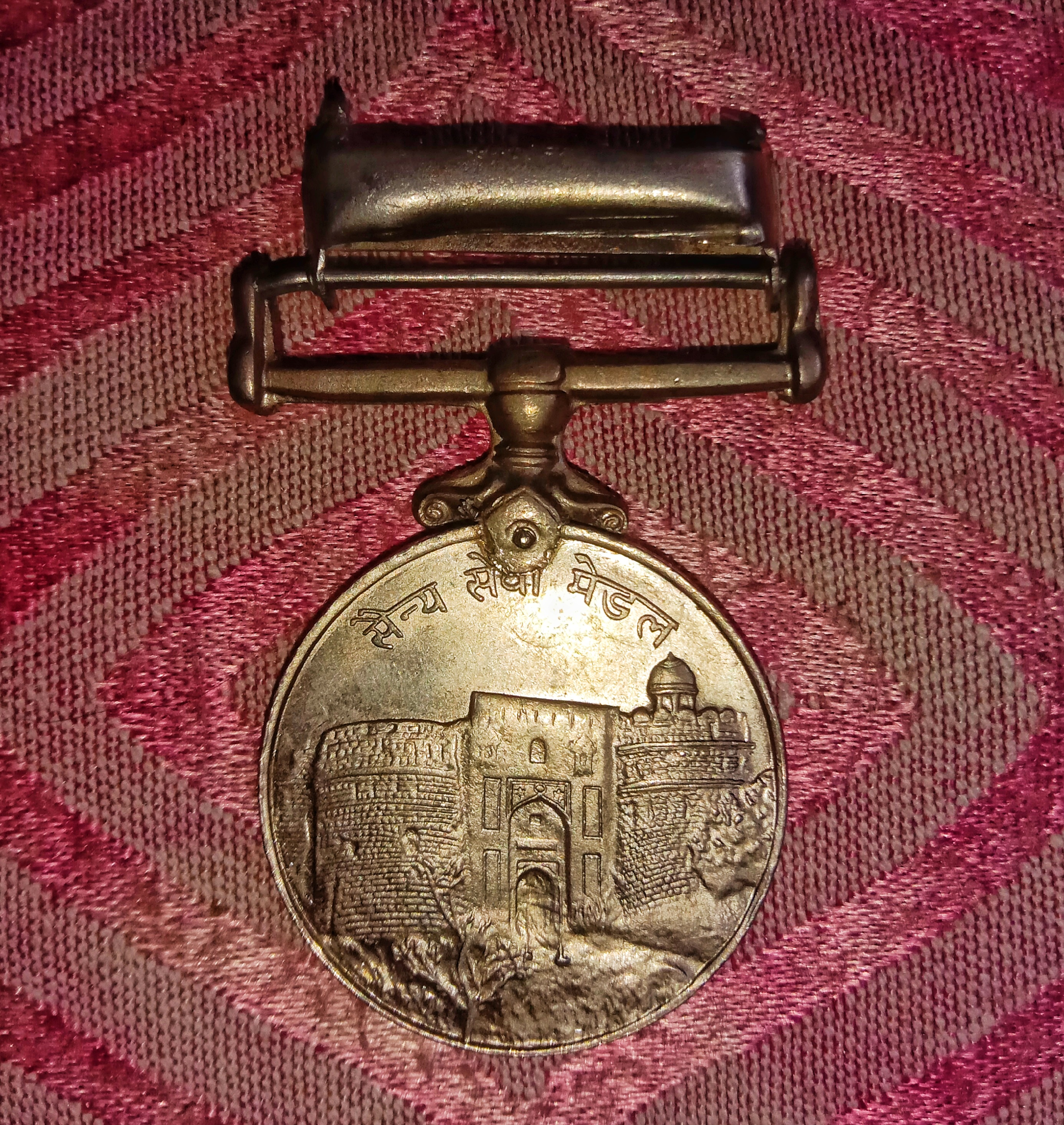
Reverse of the Sainya Seva Medal with depiction of Purana Qila.

== See also ==
- Agrasen Ki Baoli
- History of Delhi
- Red fort
- Kans Quila
- Qila Rai Pithora
- Siri Fort
- Tughlaqabad Fort
