= Sabz Burj =

Monuments in Delhi

Sabz Burj (Neeli Chattri)
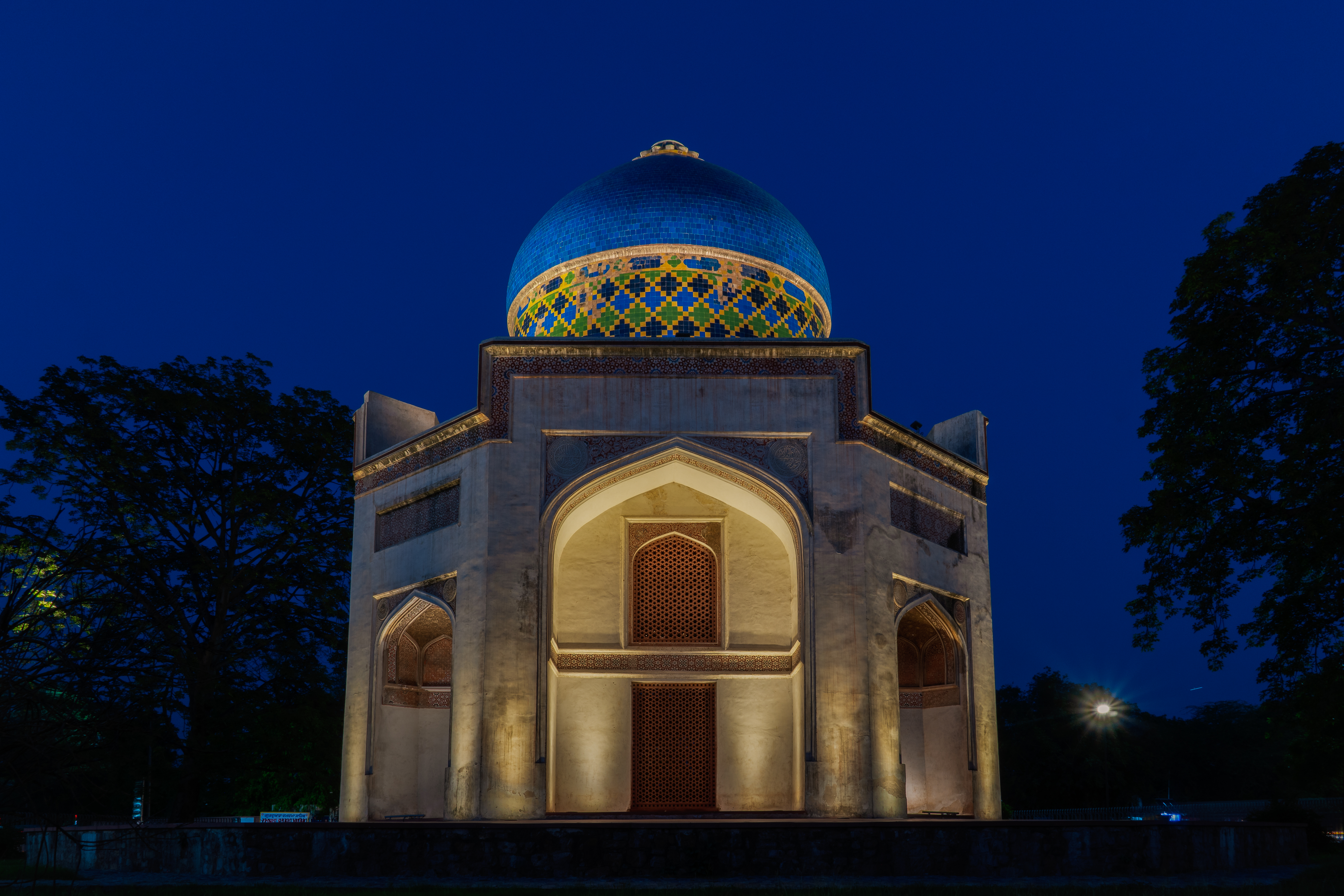
- The Sabz Burj, post restoration, in 2023
- Interactive map of Sabz Burj (Neeli Chattri)
- 28.59317°N 77.24366°E
- Type: Mausoleum
- Location: Mathura Road, Nizamuddin East, Delhi, India

History
- Built: 1530s

Site notes
- Height: 22 metres (72 ft)
- Architectural style: Mughal architecture with influences from Timurid architecture
- Restored: 2021; 5 years ago
- Restored by: Aga Khan Trust for Culture (AKTC) and Archaeological Survey of India (ASI)

Monument of National Importance

Sabz Burj (lit. 'Green Tower') is an octagonal Mughal-era mausoleum situated at an intersection on Mathura Road, near Nizamuddin complex, west of Humayun's Tomb, Delhi. Constructed in 1530s, it is among the earliest Mughal-era buildings and features rare patterns inspired by Timurid architecture from Central Asia. The identity of its builder and who is buried here is not known. Its ceiling, painted using pure gold and lapis lazuli is considered to be the earliest painted ceiling for any Mughal structure in India with no similar example surviving anywhere else in the world.

== Etymology ==
The name Sabz Burj, translates to "Green Tower". The current name of the monument refers to the green glazed tiles on the drum, onion dome, and finial of the tomb.

By the 1980s, when most of the original tiles on the exterior had fallen off, the Archaeological Survey of India (ASI) erroneously replaced it with modern blue tiles. These have since been removed in the restoration carried out in 2021. The Sabz Burj is often confused with another monument in its vicinity, called the Nila Gumbad (lit. 'Blue Dome').

It is also known as "Neeli Chattri", which translates to "Blue Umbrella".

== History ==
The Lodi dynasty that ruled the Delhi Sultanate was defeated by the forces of Babur in the year 1526 at the First Battle of Panipat, establishing the Mughal Empire on the Indian subcontinent. Thought to be constructed in the 1530s, the Sabz Burj predates the Humayun's Tomb and is thought to be among the earliest Mughal-era buildings.

Since there is no inscription or surviving historical record of the mausoleum, the identity of those buried under it is not known. However, its ceiling featuring opulent gold artwork and its location near the shrine of the 13th century Sufi-Saint Hazrat Nizamuddin suggests that it is of immense significance and could belong to a close aide of the Mughal ruler or a Mughal royal. Basis this evidence, Ebba Koch, a Mughal historian concluded that this mausoleum was built by Humayun, the second Mughal emperor for his mother, Maham Begum.

Originally situated within an enclosed garden, the monument today is situated on a traffic island. It was used as a police station in the early 20th century. During this period, the painted interiors were damaged due to the use of cement on the surfaces. This was followed by faulty repairs in the 1980s on the drum and the dome that led to further damage to the structure.

=== Restoration ===
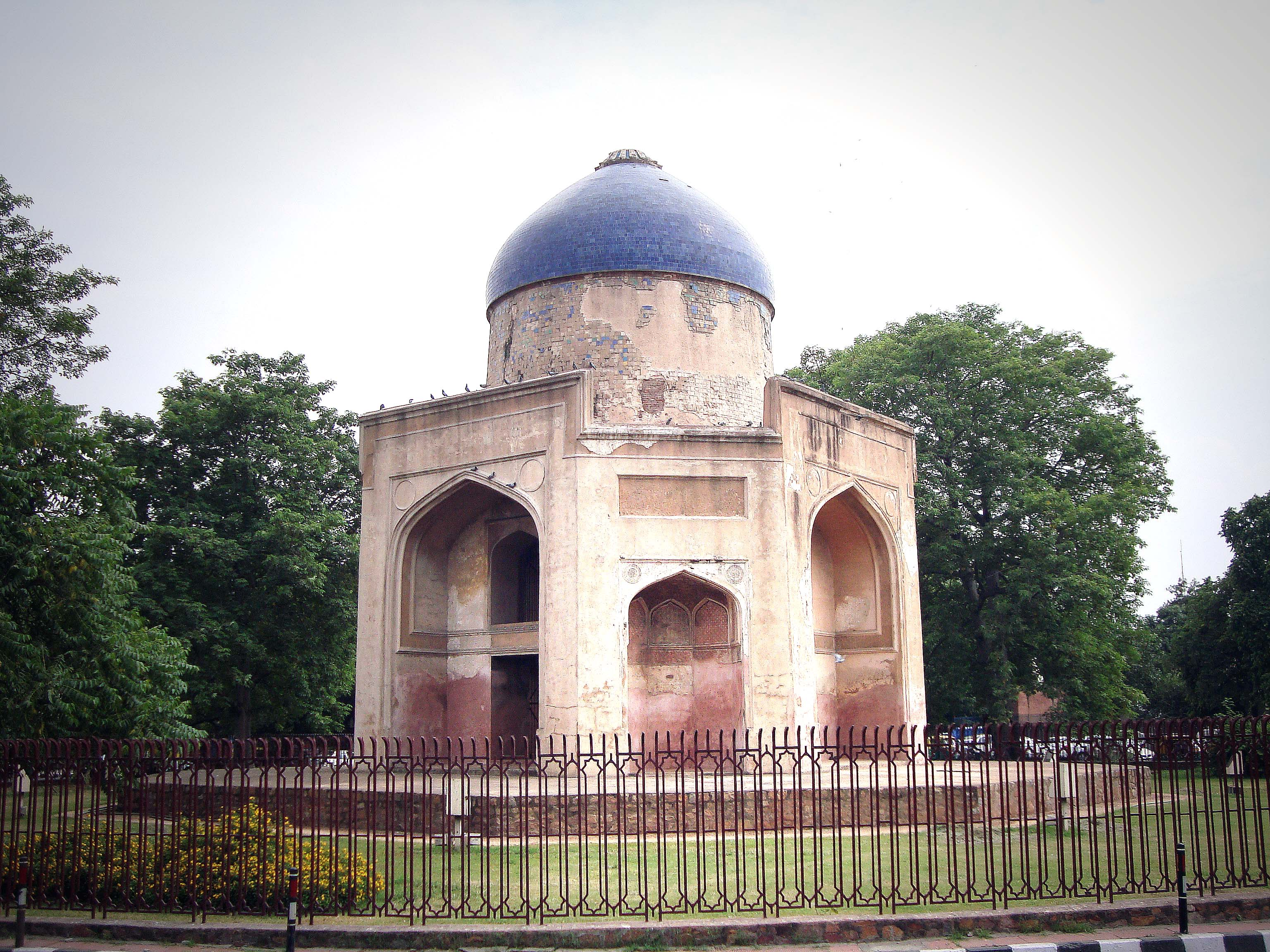
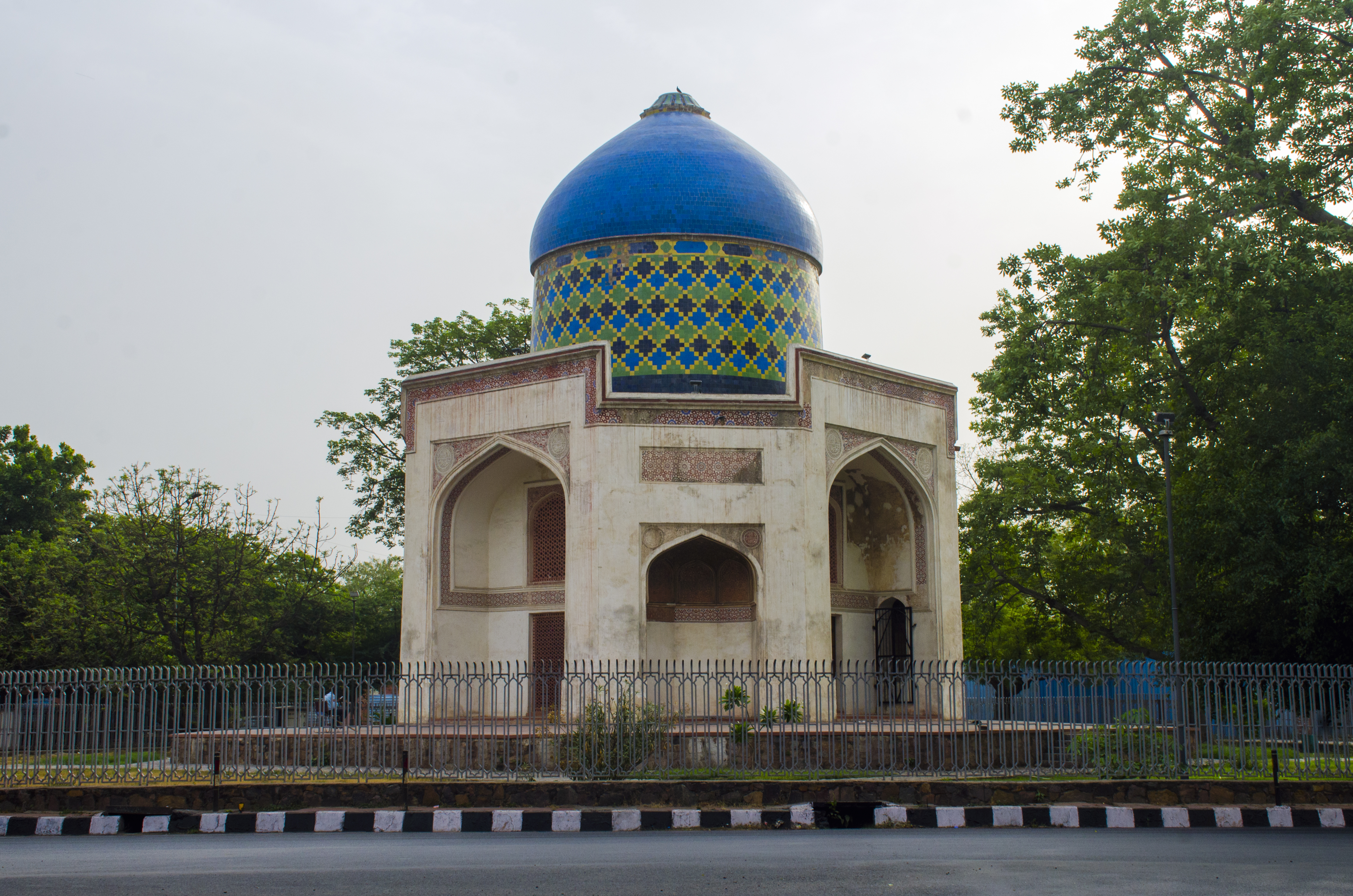
The Sabz Burj before restoration in 2013 (left) and after restoration in 2022 (right).

The Sabz Burj underwent a restoration between 2018 and 2021. The restoration was carried out by the Aga Khan Trust for Culture (AKTC) and the Archaeological Survey of India (ASI) with funds from Havells India after years of the structure being in a state of neglect, disuse and subject to faulty repairs.

The restoration work required the removal of cement plaster layers, terracotta tiles and iron grills, which were all 20th century additions, and these were replaced with glazed quartz tiles (closely matching the ones used in the 16th century) and sandstone jallis. The floral and geometric ornamentation made of incised plasterwork on the façade was restored by discerning the original patterns from surviving fragments of the design and restoring them in full. Traditional building material like lime mortar was used for all the repairs. Hand tools were used by master craftsmen for the conservation works and revived crafts like glazed tilework used during the restoration works of the Humayun's tomb were used to restore the tilework of the Sabz Burj.

When the original 16th century painting on the ceiling were rediscovered during conservation works, the AKTC requested the ASI to remove cement and tiles from the erroneous restoration in the 1980s in order to clean and conserve the painting. The rediscovery of the painting and its rarity and complexity took the conservators by surprise. It took three years of scientific cleaning of the plaster layers to reveal the surviving painting.

The restoration ensured that the painted ceiling was visible again after almost 100 years and further damage of the structure from issues like rainwater seepage was arrested. Restoration was completed by 2021. It is now an ASI protected monument and has been added to the list of Monuments of National Importance.

== Architecture ==
Subz Burj is an octagonal domed mausoleum with its dome largely covered in blue tiles (although subz means "green"). Its construction has influences of Central Asian architecture, consisting of alternating wide and narrow sides. Entrances have been built into the wider sides, while the narrower sides are ornamented in a pattern of incised plaster, paint or glazed tiles.

=== Style ===
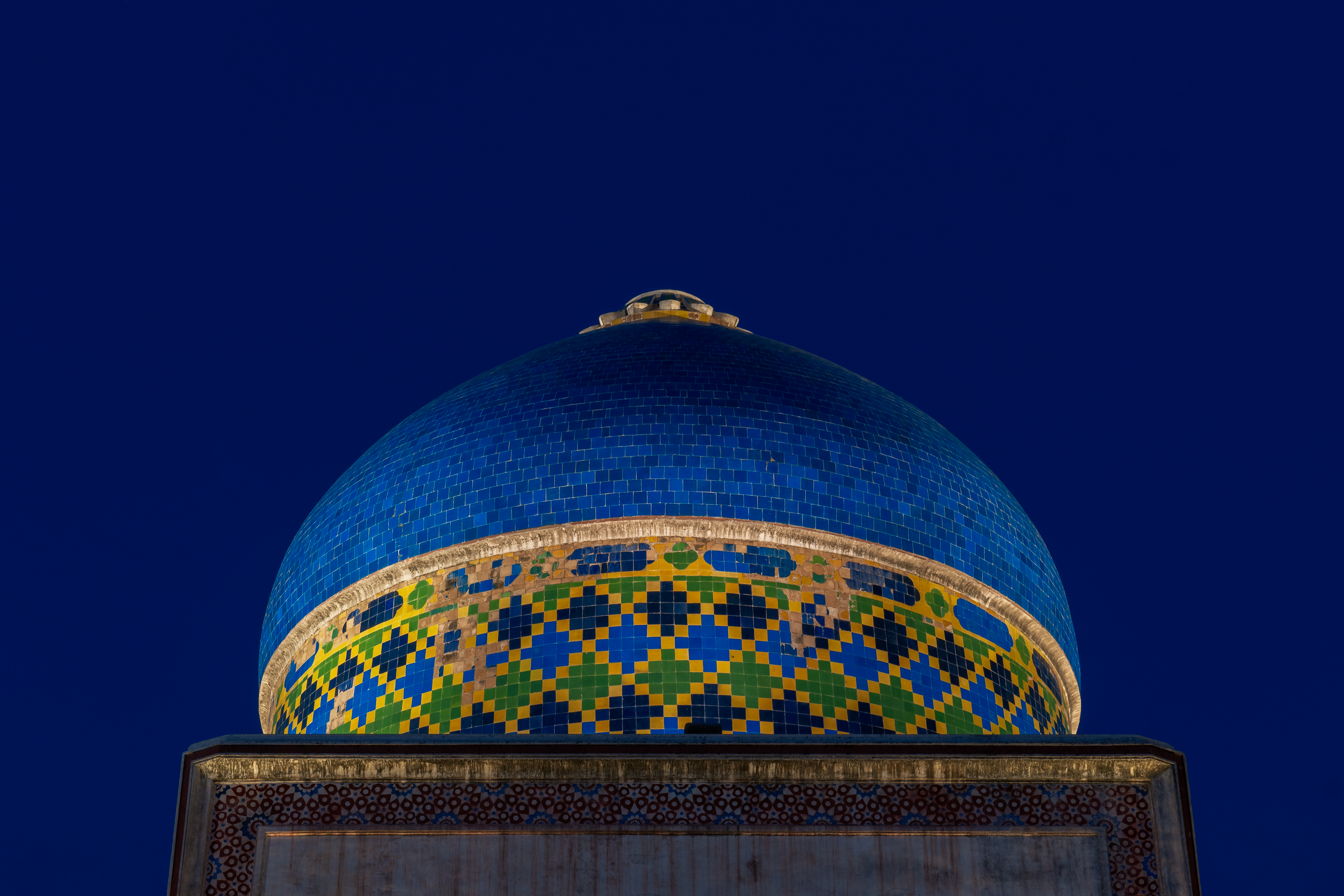
Interlacing geometric patterns made using glazed tiles on the tomb's drum.

Sabz Burj is an example of early Mughal architecture with influences from Timurid architecture from Central Asia. The mausoleum marks the first time in the history of medieval Indian art where two features, namely the octagonalised-square plan and the high bulbous dome appeared in perfectly developed state, making this an extremely important building.

The mausoleum's double-dome, thought to be the oldest in India, decorated with geometric designs made using glazed tiles is similar to the dome and geometric designs of the Gur-e-Amir, in present-day Uzbekistan. This establishes influences of Timurid architecture on early Mughal architecture.

==== Features and Decoration ====
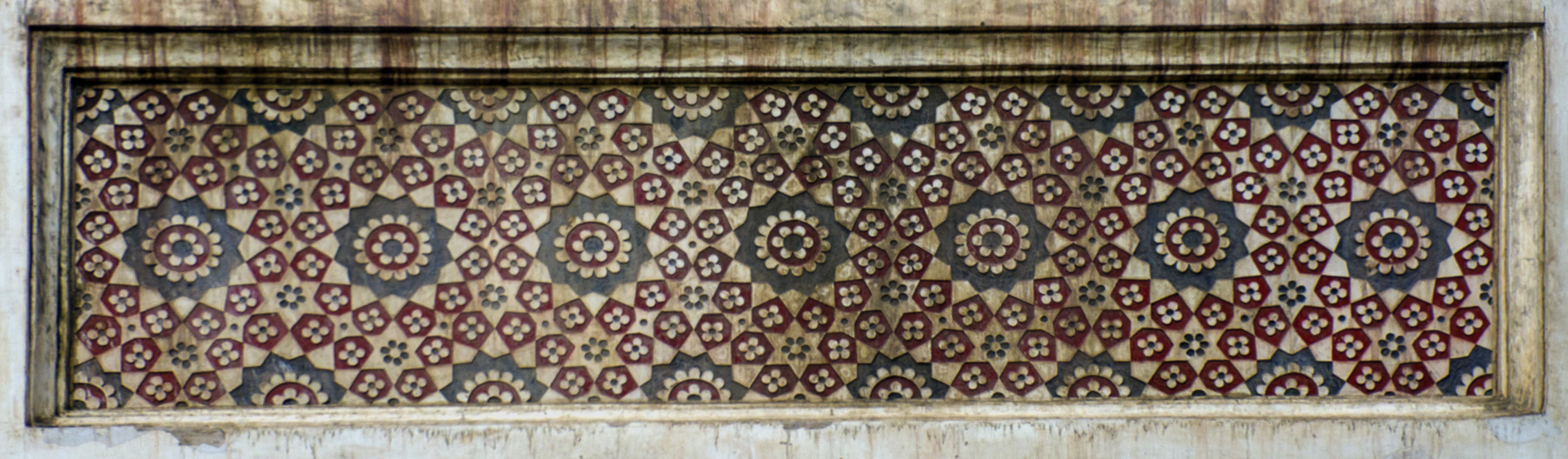
Ornamentation work on the façade.

The tomb features geometric tilework on its drum, dome and finial. It also has sandstone jaalis on its doorways and incised plaster work on its ceiling. Each of its eight façades have differing incised plaster patterns, which is uncommon on Islamic monuments. The tomb's painted ceiling is considered to be the most significant element of the tomb. Considered the earliest painted ceiling for any Mughal structure, it predates artforms like Mughal miniature paintings. Regarding the painted ceiling, Mughal historian Ebba Koch observed:

... such highly decorated vaults using lapiz lazuli and gold are known in royal buildings of Timurid architecture but their decoration tends to be organised in sections. A coherent decorative system such as at Sabz Burj is rare.

Originally, along with the painted ceiling, the walls of the inner chamber were completely covered in paintings. These have however been lost and only small patches of the original paintings survive today.
