= Mathura Road, Delhi =

Part of NH2; connecting Delhi to Mathura, Uttar Pradesh, India

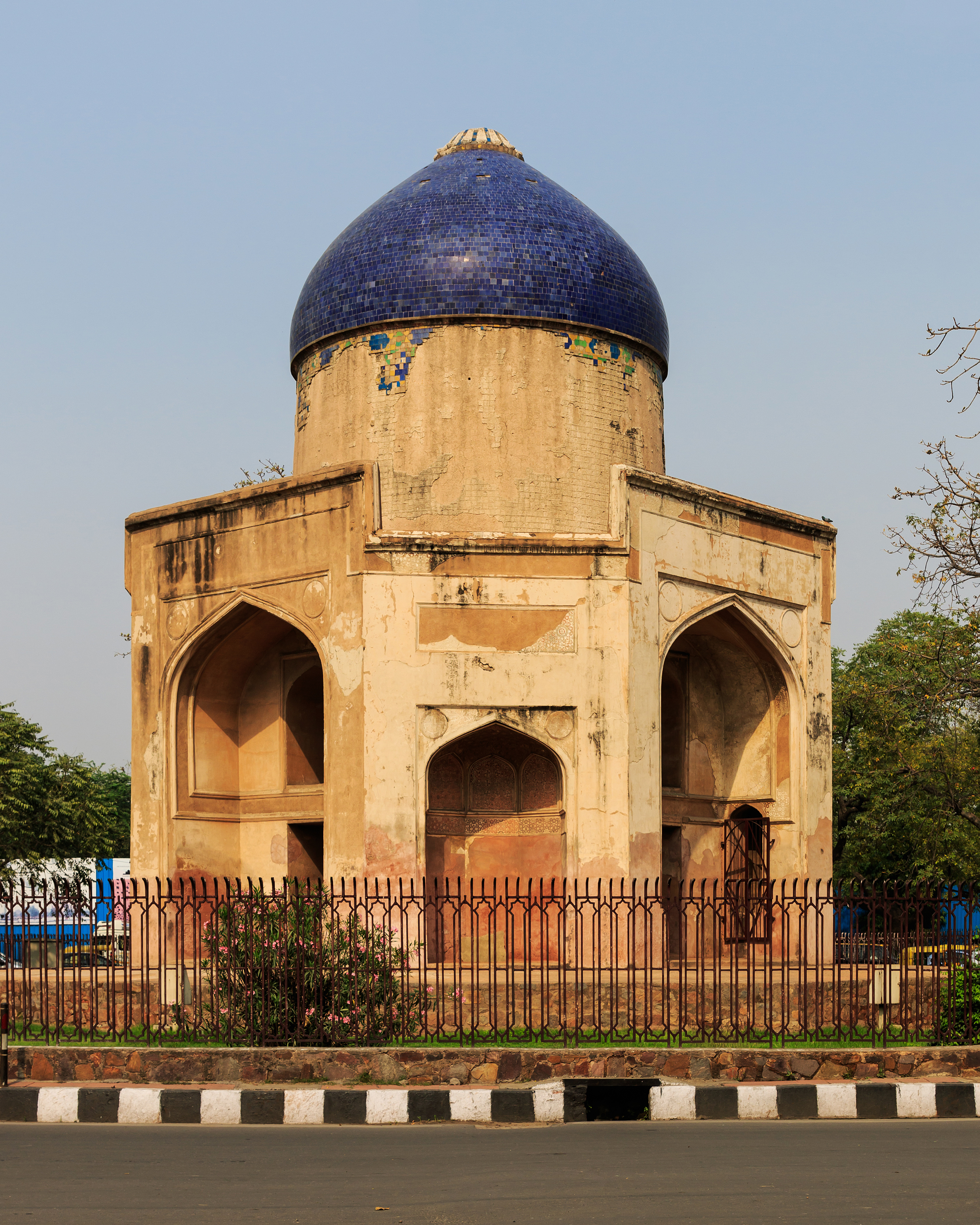
Sabz Burj on Mathura road traffic circle, Delhi

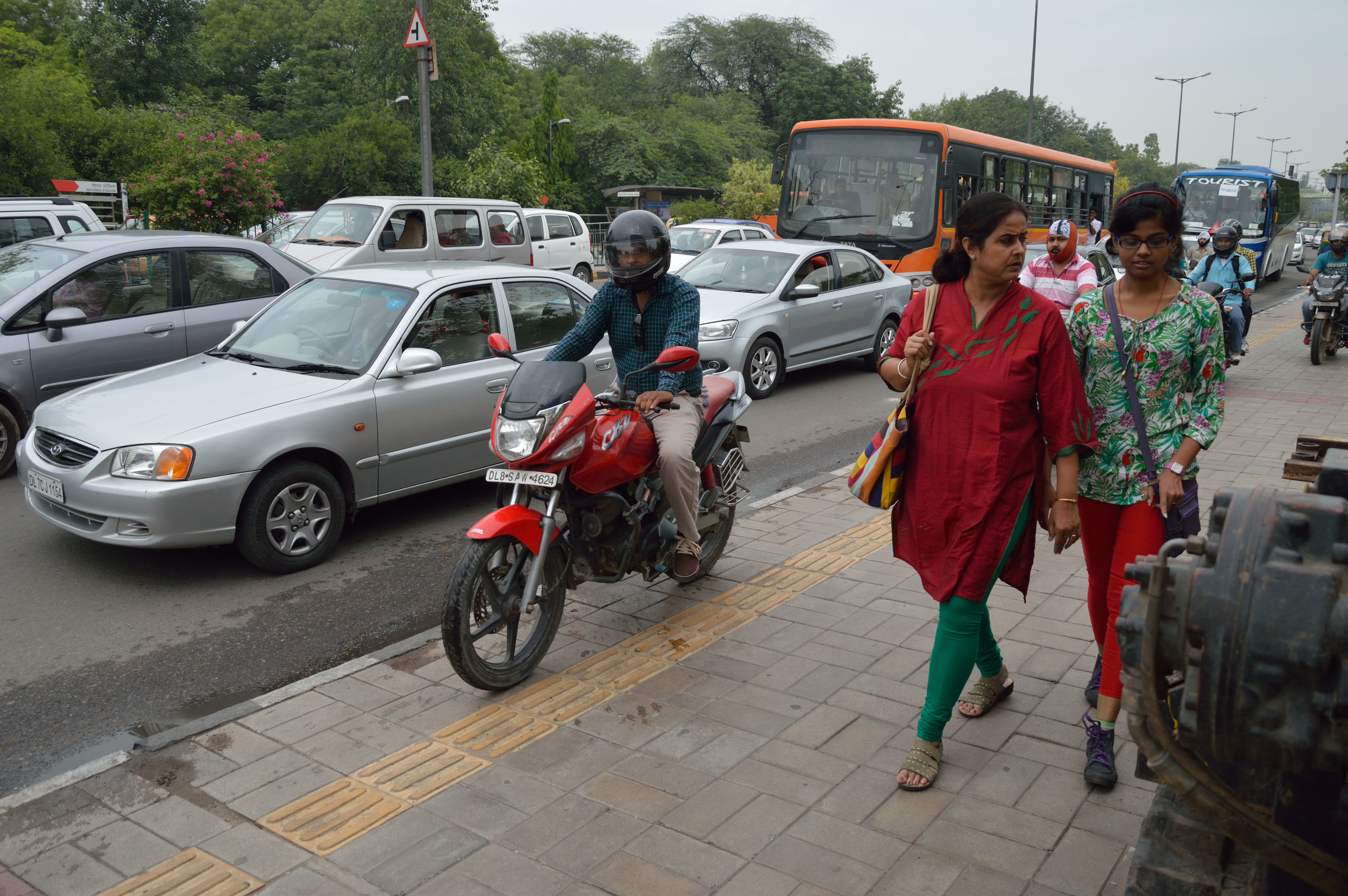
Busy Mathura road at office hours, New Delhi.

Mathura Road is a road in Delhi and a part of the NH 2 (Delhi-Howrah) Highway. Some of it is part of the Grand Trunk Road passing through Faridabad, and it leads right up to the town of Mathura, in Hindu mythology the birthplace of the god Krishna.

Further down the road stand the National Zoological Park Delhi, Purana Qila and Pragati Maidan, which was Delhi's largest convention and exhibition space.

The grave of the poet Bedil, lies in a garden called Bagh-e-Bedil (Garden of Bedil) situated across Purana Qila, at Mathura Road.

== Architectural monuments on Mathura Road ==
- Purana Qila, Delhi
- Sher Shah Gate, and the remains of the fort of Sher Shah Suri
- Bāġ-e Bīdel (Garden of Bīdel), the grave of Abdul-Qādir Bīdel
- Pragati Maidan, a venue for exhibitions and conventions
- Sabz Burj
- Humayun's Tomb
