= Kans Quila =

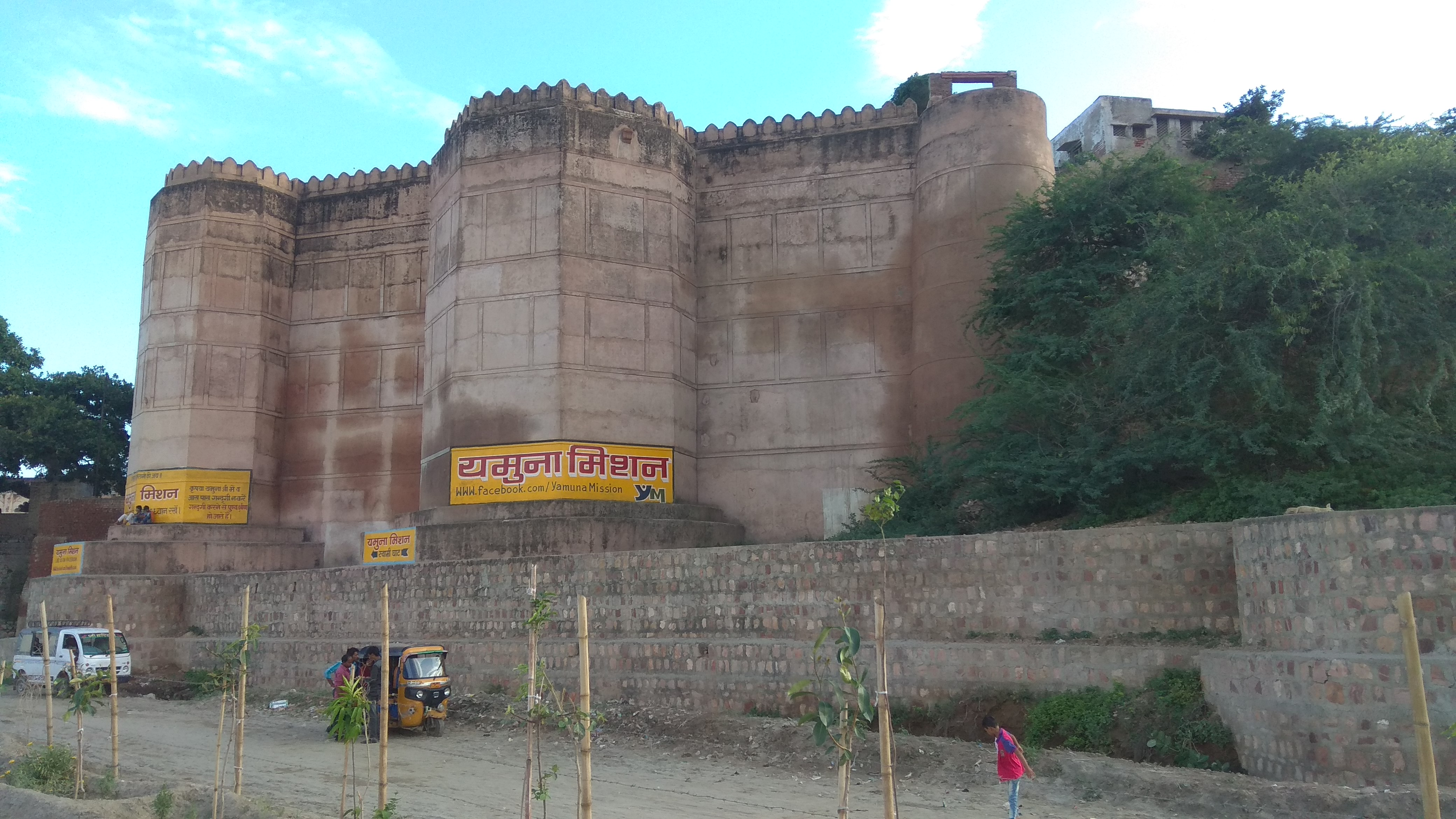
- Interactive map of the Kans Quila area

General information
- Location: Mathura, India
- Coordinates: 27°30′28″N 77°40′56″E

Technical details
- Structural system: Brick and Mortar

Kans Quila or Kans Kila is a fortified castle located in Mathura, India.

The earliest definitive mention of the castle is by Narahara Chakravarti in the 18th century, who described it to be the ruins of Kansa's castle. Since then, the castle walls have largely crumbled away and the site has been encroached upon. The current structure was built by Man Singh I. An observatory is said to have been added in the complex by Sawai Jai Singh (1699–1743), however it has been demolished now. The fort was used by Jats and Marathas, and under the British rule the fort was neglected and somewhat demolished. The fort has an audience hall surrounded by red sandstone pillars. The fort was earlier used as a barrier against floods.

== Gallery ==
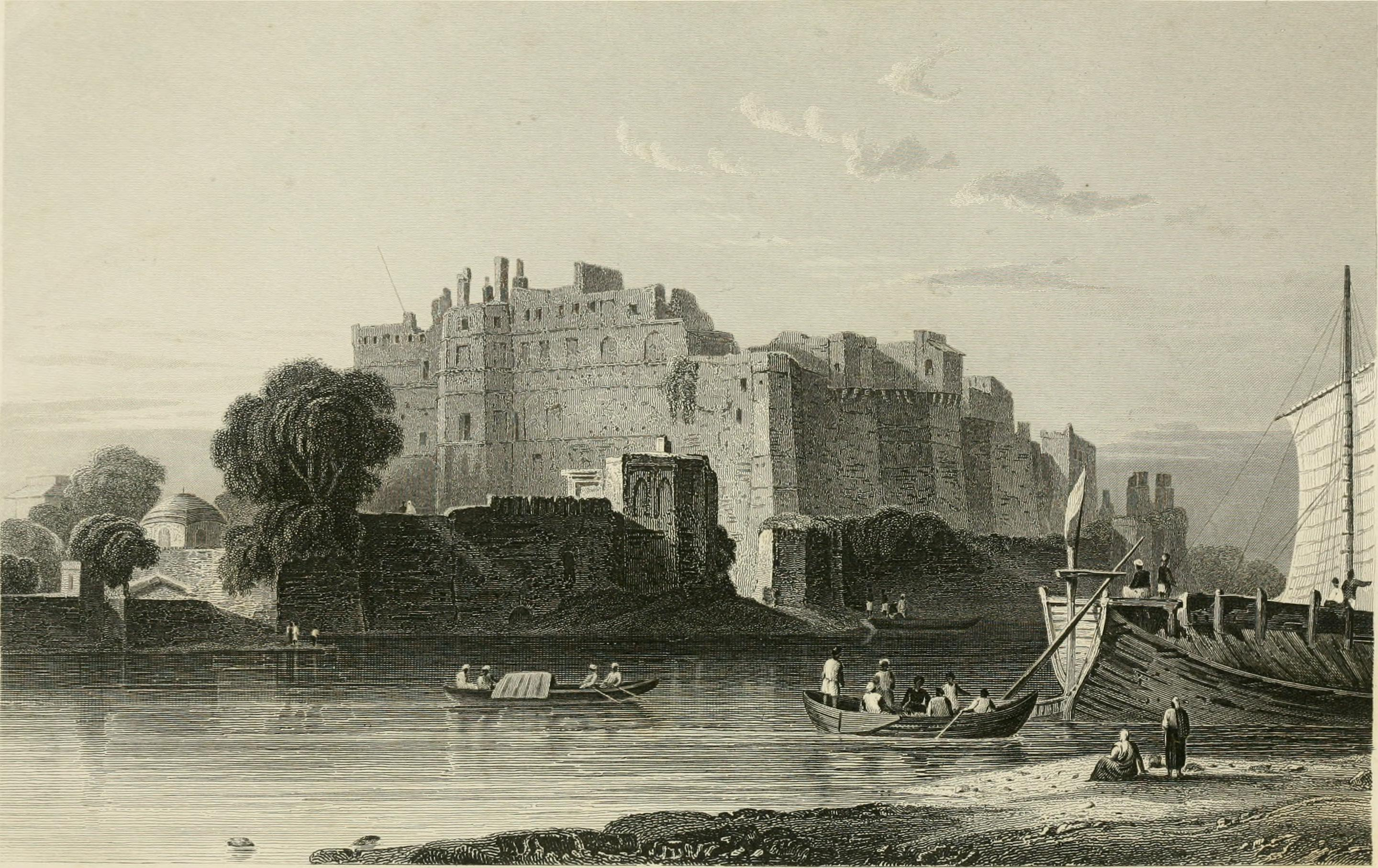
Kans Quila in 1858

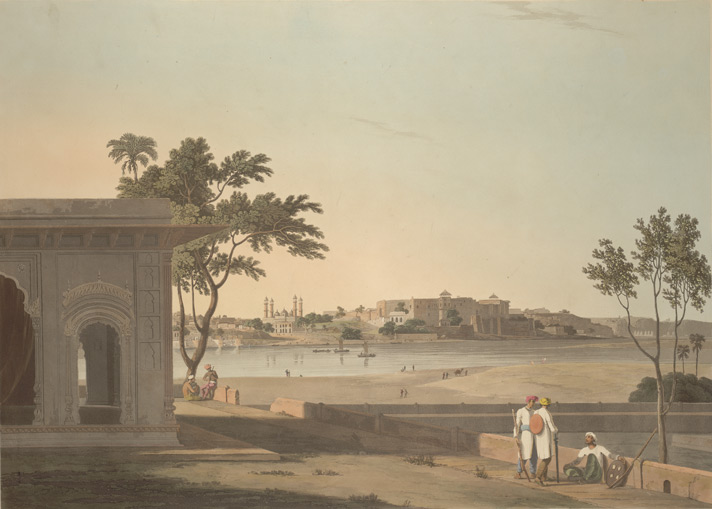
Late 18th century painting of Mathura, including Kans Qila, across the Jamuna river by Daniell brothers.

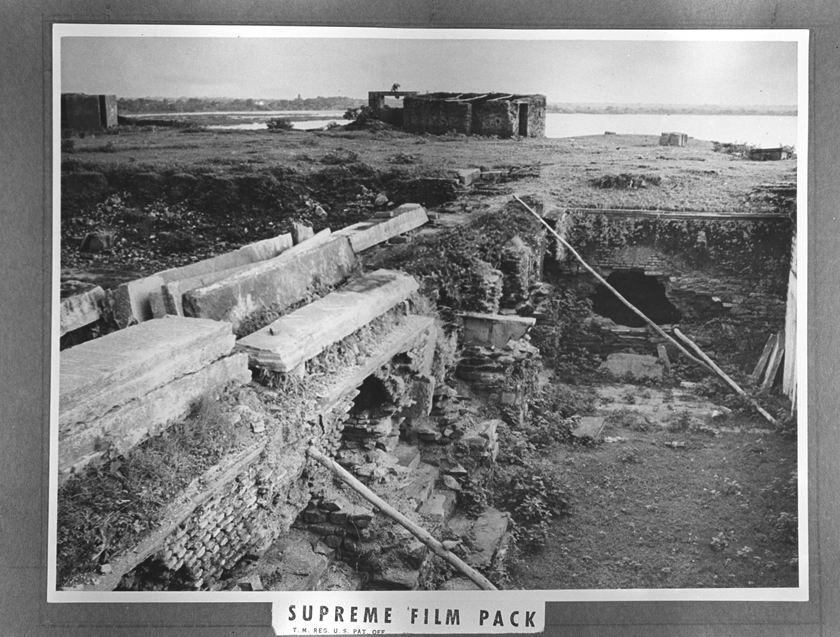
Interior view of Kamsa’s fort, 1949

== See also ==
- Purana Qila, location of Pandava's ancient capital Indraprastha in present day Delhi
- Dwarka, the ancient capital of Lord Krishna
