= Tarikh-i-Sher Shahi =

1580 biography of Suri emperor Sher Shah Suri (1472–1545)

- Author: Abbas Sarwani
- Publication date: 1580
- Publication place: Mughal India

The Tarikh-i-Sher Shahi (lit. 'History of Sher Shah') is a historical work dated 1580 CE which was compiled by Abbas Khan Sarwani, a waqia-navis under Mughal emperor Akbar, detailing the rule of Sher Shah Suri, founder of the Sur Empire. The work was commissioned by Akbar to provide detailed documentation about Sher Shah's administration - Akbar's father Humayun had been defeated by Sher Shah.

Abbas wrote the Tarik-i Sher Shahi using his own local Indo-Afghan cultural style, not in the style and language of standard Persian.

== Modern historiography ==
The history of medieval India has benefited greatly from this compilation, thanks to the efforts of K. Qanungo, H. Haig, A. Rahim and I. Siddiqui.

Abbas Khan Sarwani selected Tuhfah-i-Akbar Shahi as the title of his book and it was an elaborate history of the Lodi and Sur sultans. On the other hand, Tarikh-i-Sher Shahi was actually the first chapter of the book, only this part of the work is found at present. The writer of the Tarikh-i-Sher Shahi had marriage relations with Sher Shah, also he had contact with the acquaintances whose fathers worked for Sher Shah and his son Islam Shah. A number of persons who had served in the government of the Afghan rulers in high rank were mentioned as the sources of Sarwani. The book also includes brief biographies of those contemporary persons who are mentioned.

Under the Mughal emperor Akbar, Abbas Khan Sarwani was in charge of utilizing court documents, he was also in charge of the Mughal emperor’s library and private collection of books. In spite of serving as a Mughal emperor and being a government servant, Sarwani idealized Sher Shah and praised him for the introduction of new political and administrative institutions and policies. Sarwani was an Afghan himself but the tribal rivalry and jealousy of the Afghan leaders were known to him. He held these reasons responsible for Afghan misfortune and defeat against the Mughals. Sarwani wrote the Tarikh-i-Sher Shahi in 1586 AD.

For the restoration of Bengal’s history, the Tarikh-i-Sher Shahi is one of the most significant sourcebooks. The writer of the book provides a clear picture of Sher Shah taking over Bengal and how Bengal lost its independence. Ghiyasuddin Mahmud Shah was the sultan of Bengal from 1533 to 1538. Shah succeeded his father and brother and became the sultan of Bengal. He inherited an enormous kingdom and a well-decorated administration. The sagacity and intelligence of Sher Shah made it possible to overthrow Ghiasuddin Mahmud Shah from power and take control of Bengal. Sher Shah was the son of a jagirdar, from that position he taking over Bengal, successfully reached the throne of Delhi Sultanate.
