= Abbas Sarwani =

Mughal Indian historian

Abbas Sarwani was a historian during the Mughal period in India. Little is known of his personal life, except that he was a member of the Sarwani Pashtun family.

Accordingly, one of his ancestors settled near Banur town and received 2000 bighas of land during the reign of Bahlul Lodi. This land was eventually returned to Abbas' father, Shaykh Ali, during the reign of Shah Sur, following the expulsion of the Mughal Empire in 1540. By 1579 this land was returned to the state, which prompted Abbas to be employed by Sayyid Hamid, a scholar of the Mughal emperor Akbar.

At the behest of Akbar, Abbas compiled, in 1582, Tufah-yi Akbar Shahi, better known as, Ta'rikh-i Sher Shahi, a biography of Shah Sur. The Ta'rikh-i Sher Shahi was compiled after the fall of the Sur dynasty with the preconceived notion of enhancing the Pashtun dynasty when facts were lacking. Abbas' work is not a first hand source, but a combination of sources from Sarwani nobles that served with the Lodi and Sur dynasties.
