= Battle of Surajgarh =

Sher Shah Suri's war with Sultanate of Bengal in 1534 AD

Date	March 1534
Location	Bihar
Result	Sur victory

Belligerents
Sur Empire; Ujjainiya Estate	Bengal Sultanate; Lohani Chiefs; Portuguese Empire

Commanders and leaders
Sher Shah Suri; Gajpati Ujjainia	Ghiyasuddin Mahmud Shah; Jalal Khan; Ibrahim Khan †

The Battle of Surajgarh took place at Surajgarh in Bihar between Sher Shah Suri and the combined forces of the Lohani chiefs of Bihar and Sultan Mahmud Shah of Bengal in 1534.

== Background ==
Makhdum Alam refused to accept Ghiyasuddin Mahmud Shah as the Sultan of Bengal with a plea of assassinating Sultan Alauddin Firuz. Makhdum formed an alliance with Sher Khan who was the deputy ruler of Bihar. And afterwards he showed a rebellious attitude. At that time, Sher Khan was the ruler of Bihar as he was the acting guardian of Jalal Khan Lohani. Sher Khan's growing power created two groups in Bihar, one led by Sher Khan and the other by Jalal Khan. Jalal Khan asked for Mahmud's help against Sher Khan and with an excuse of attacking Bengal, he crossed the border with his supporters and surrendered himself to Mahmud's shelter, acknowledging his allegiance. The asylum of Jalal Khan at the court of the Sultan of Bengal gave Mahmud Shah the exclusive right to subdue Sher Khan. Mahmud Shah sent an army of artillery, cavalry and infantry under Ibrahim Khan in 1534 to conquer Bihar. Jalal Khan was also with Ibrahim Khan in this expedition.

== Battle ==
Sher Khan abruptly attacked the combined forces of the Lohani chiefs of Bihar and Mohamud Shah of Bengal and defeated them at Surajgarh in March 1534. In this battle Ibrahim Khan was defeated and killed and Jalal Khan was forced to return to his patron Mahmud Shah. Sher Shah invaded the whole Bihar with the victory.

== Aftermath ==
The battle of Surajgarh destroyed the military status of Bengal. The Lohanis then left the scene. Both Ghiyasuddin Mahmud Shah and Sher Khan were determined to continue fighting till the end. Meanwhile, the arrival of the Portuguese Empire on the coast of Bengal and their activities put Mahmud in more trouble. In 1534, the Portuguese came to Chittagong port to start trade in Bengal. But they misbehaved with the Muslim governors and businessmen of Chittagong. As a result, they were taken prisoner on the orders of Ghiyasuddin Mahmud Shah and were sent to Gauḍa as prisoners. But due to Sher Khan's aggressive activities, which were intensified by the conquest of Surajgarh, Mahmud was forced to change his course. Mahmud Shah realized the need to establish friendship with the Portuguese in order to deal with Sher Khan. The prisoners were released with this realization; afterwards he appointed de Melo Jusarte as a military adviser. The Portuguese were also allowed to build factories in Chittagong and Satgaon (Hooghli).

== See also ==
- Sur Empire
- Sur (Pashtun tribe)
- Delhi Sultanate
- Ghiyasuddin Mahmud Shah
- Gajpati Ujjainia
