= Siege of Raisen =

Siege of Raisen, may refer to:

- Siege of Raisen (1532), Bahadur Shah of Gujarat's conquest of Raisen
- Siege of Raisen (1542–1543), Sher Shah Suri's conquest of Raisen
