= Battle of Chausa =

1539 battle between Humayun and Sher Shah Suri

Date	26 June 1539
Location	Chausa (in present-day Buxar, Bihar, India)
Result	Suri victory

Belligerents
Sur Empire; Ujjainiya dynasty	Mughal Empire

Commanders and leaders
Sher Shah Suri; Gajpati Ujjainia; Jalal Khan; Khawas Khan	Humayun; Bairam Khan

Strength
Unknown	200,000

Casualties and losses
Unknown	7,000

The Battle of Chausa was a notable military engagement between the Mughal Emperor, Humayun, and the Afghan ruler, Sher Shah Suri. It was fought on 26 June 1539 at Chausa, 10 miles southwest of Buxar in modern-day Bihar, India. Sher Shah Suri was assisted by his allies, the Ujjainiya Rajputs of Bhojpur, as well as the Lohtamia and Gautam Rajputs who were led by the commander, Gajpati Ujjainia.

== Background ==
Armies of the Mughals and the Sur at Chausa

== Battle ==
Humayun divided the province of Bengal into Jagirs among his officers and indulged in luxuries. Meanwhile, Sher Khan established his control over various regions and cut off Humayun's contacts with Agra. To put pressure on Sher Khan, Humayun marched towards Agra through the Grand Trunk Road, but Sher Khan provoked Humayun to recross the Ganga River to its southern bank at Chausa. Both armies remained encamped for three months, during which Sher Khan cleverly indulged Humayun in negotiations for peace. With the beginning of the rains, Sher Khan attacked the Mughal forces and caused a lot of confusion among them. The Mughal camp was filled with water, and a great number of soldiers were killed by the Afghans, and about 8,000 of them drowned in the flooded Ganga. Sher Khan captured the Mughal camp along with their artillery and harem. Sher Khan treated the ladies of the harem kindly and made arrangements for their safe return to Humayun. Humayun escaped from the battlefield to save his life.

== Aftermath ==
Sher Shah was victorious and crowned himself Farīd al-Dīn Shēr Shāh. Babur's cousin, Mirza Haidar asserted that the armies might have numbered over 200,000 troops.

== See also ==
- Battle of Sirhind (1555)
