= Chausa =

- Town
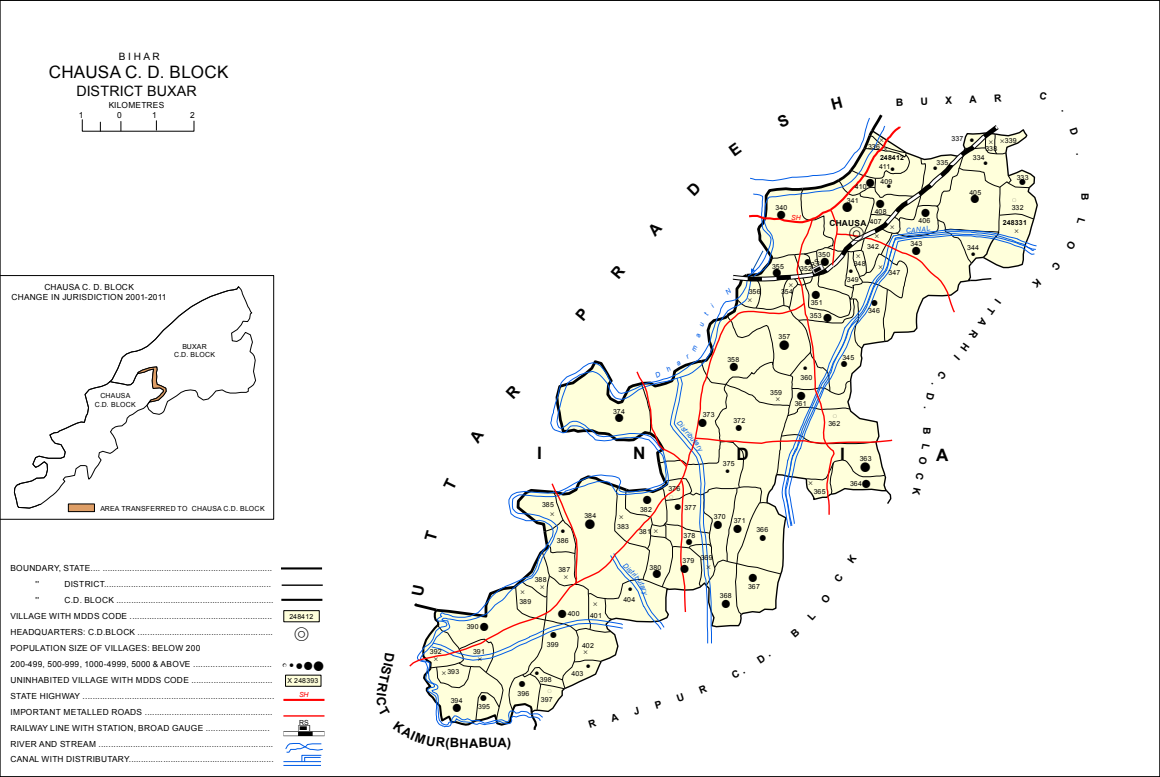
- Map of Chausa block

- Location in Bihar, India Chausa (India)
- Coordinates: 25.5075447°N 83.8823147°E
- Country: India
- State: Bihar
- District: Buxar
- Established: 1991

Area
  - Total: 2.68 km^{2} (1.03 sq mi)
- Elevation: 55 m (180 ft)

Population (2011)
  - Total: 9,011
  - Density: 3,360/km^{2} (8,710/sq mi)

Languages
  - Official: Hindi
- Time zone: UTC+5:30 (IST)
- PIN: 802114
- Telephone code: 06183
- Vehicle registration: Br-44
- Website: buxar.bih.nic.in

Chausa (also spelled as Chowsah) is a town and corresponding community development block in Buxar district, Bihar, India. It is located 11 km west of the district headquarters, Buxar, on the bank of the river Ganga. As of 2011, the population of the village of Chausa was 9,011, in 1,362 households, while the total block population was 103,670, in 15,817 households.

The area is famous as the site of the Battle of Chausa, in which the forces of Sher Shah Suri defeated Mughal emperor Humayun's army in 1539. It was also the site of discovery of the Chausa hoard, a set of 18 ancient Jain bronzes. According to the old records of Chausa we get to know that Chausa was established by Sakarwar Rajput of Kamsar region who adopted Islam in 1500ADs.

== Battle of Chausa ==
The Battle of Chausa (25 June 1539) took place between Mughal Emperor Humayun and Sher Shah Suri (Sher Khan). In this battle Humayun got defeated.

== Demographics ==
Historical population
Year	Pop.	±%
2001	83,594	—
2011	103,670	+24.0%
Source: 2011 Census of India

Chausa is an entirely rural block, with no major urban centres. The sex ratio of the block in 2011 was 916, lower than the Buxar district ratio of 922. The sex ratio was higher among the 0-6 age group, with 935 females for every 1000 males. Members of scheduled castes constituted 17.31% of the block's population, and members of scheduled tribes made up 1.39%. The literacy rate of the block was 71.27%, slightly above the district rate of 70.14%, with a 22.99% gender literacy gap between men (82.24%) and women (59.25%). Chausa block also had the highest literacy rate among scheduled castes populations (62.56%) among blocks in Buxar district.

=== Employment ===
A majority of workers in Chausa block were employed in agriculture in 2011, with 24.19% being cultivators who owned or leased their own land and another 52.68% being agricultural labourers who worked another person's land for wages. A further 4.72% were household industry workers, and the remaining 18.42% were other workers.

== Transport ==
Chausa possesses permanent pucca roads connected to both national and state highways. The village also has access to railway transport. Direct trains are available from major cities of country. Chausa Railway Station, Barakalan Railway Station are the very nearby railway stations to Chausa. The distance from Buxar Railway station is 11 km and Patna Airport/Railway 138 km and from Varanasi airport 127 km.

== Villages ==
Chausa block contains 82 villages, including Chausa itself. Of these, 57 are inhabited and 25 are uninhabited:

Village name	Total land area (hectares)	Population (in 2011)
Betbandh	93	0
Sharifpur	80	161
Nawagawan	47	640
Sauwanbandh	93	353
Dhundhani	138	369
Madanpura	13	0
Jokahi	47	418
Bahabuddin Chak	62	0
Mahmudpur	15	0
Narbatpur	289	4,376
Chausa (block headquarters)	268	9,011
Salarpur	73	0
Chundi	529	3,609
Kashipur	102	416
Bechanpurwa	257	779
Baghelwa	151	904
Mahdewa	119	0
Madhopur	21	0
Dharamaghatpur	40	300
Nyayapur	114	1,950
Kanak Narayanpur	117	1,333
Narainapur	21	744
Akhauripur	91	2,331
Jalwandei	22	0
Khelafatpur	162	1,242
Konia	17	0
Banarpur	298	5,192
Sikraur	270	4,839
Khorampur	150	0
Mohanpurwa	85	401
Kocharhi	102	2,489
Jagdishpur	114	47
Sarenja	424	8,483
Kusrupa	118	2,051
Tikaitpur	42	0
Ora	193	904
Pithari	161	1,030
Burhadih	178	1,395
Hafizwa	53	0
Rajapur	153	2,087
Goshainpur	127	1,555
Kathtar	441	814
Jalilpur	564	4,992
Sonpa	442	4,432
Puraina	176	284
Isapur	55	183
Nawar	113	992
Sauri	74	699
Paliya	123	1,683
Kharagpura	110	1,670
Hinguhi	17	0
Rohinibhavan	86	1,543
Bhilampur	114	0
Dehri	617	7,759
Kusahi	99	0
Holartikar	53	329
Alawalpur	84	0
Balbhaddarpur	59	0
Rampur Khurd	61	0
Rampur	471	4,356
Bairampur	57.9	0
Mianpur	99	0
Manipur	57	0
Tiwaya	237.6	2,230
Dharampur	44	634
Debi Dehra	101	541
Alawalpur	51	91
Gopalpur	29	362
Sagra	160	857
Nikris	168	1,349
Bhadua	58	0
Bishunpur	89	0
Rasulpur	66	257
Deuriya	181	290
Pauni	266	3,578
Mahuari	91	1,171
Khemrajpur	44	0
Kathgharwa	91	1,161
Husenpur	125	314
Bahadurpur	59	1,237
Hadipur	64	453
Narbatpur Taufir (unsurveyed)	46	0

== Nearby places ==
- Buxar
- Varanasi
- Patna
- Ghazipur

== See also ==
- Chausa Canal
