= Gajpati Ujjainia =

Raja of Bhojpur

Raja of Bhojpur
- Born: 1484; Bhojpur, present-day Bhojpur district, India
- Died: 1577 (aged 92–93); Bhojpur, present-day Bhojpur district, India
- Dynasty: Ujjainiya

Raja Gajpati Ujjainia, also known as Raja Gajpati Sahi, was a ruler of Bhojpur belonging to the Ujjainiya dynasty.

He accepted the suzerainty of Sher Shah Suri and thus also served as a commander in the army of Sher Shah Suri, the ruler of the Sur Empire. Two of his most important military campaigns he fought was the Battle of Surajgarh and Battle of Chausa. As a reward, he was given the territory of Rohtas to his dominion. He was the first Ujjainiya chief to have a continued battle with Mughals.

== Early life ==
Gajpati was the son of the Ujjainiya ruler, Raja Badal Singh and the nephew of Raja Dalpat Sahi. Following a war of succession, Gajpati, his mother and his brother, Bairi Sal were banished and Shivram Singh became the ruler of Bhojpur. In 1532, his mother requested Sher Shah Suri to help her sons get back the throne of Bhojpur. With the support of Sher Shah Suri, Gajpati defeated and killed Shivram Singh and ascended the throne of Bhojpur in 1534.

== Battle of Surajgarha ==
The Ujjainiyas under the leadership of Raja Gajpati helped Sher Shah Suri in the battle of Surajgarha against the Bengal sultanate who at the time were a major regional power. Raja Gajpati handpicked 2000 of his best men and was able to help Sher Shah Suri in achieving victory. General Ibrahim Khan was killed by Raja Gajpati and all the camp equipment, elephants and artillery pieces of the Bengal army fell into the hands of Ujjainiyas. In return for their help, the Ujjainiyas were entitled to any of the spoils of war that they looted from the defeated army. Sher Shah also assigned Rohtas and Buxar to him as a reward and gifted a sword to his brother, Bairi Sal.

== Aftermath ==
Following the battle, Gajpati was embroiled in another familial feud with Birbhan of Arail who requested Emperor Humayun in gaining the throne of Bhojpur in 1538. Humayun provided him with some retainers and they succeeded in driving Gajpati out of his stronghold. Birbhan also supported Humayun in his clashes with Sher Shah Suri as a result of this. Gajpati in turn, after being dispossessed from his dominion, joined Sher Shah Suri and possibly took a leading role in the Battle of Chausa. He then managed to recapture his dominion and made Jagdishpur his capital and constructed a fortress there. After the defeat of Humayun, Gajpati extended his boundaries till Jaunpur, becoming the most powerful ruler of the North-western Bihar. However, he remained under the suzerainty of Sur Empire.

Later in his life, he eventually did alliance with the Mughals in their offensive against Afghans in Bihar but oftentimes kept raising the standard of rebellion.
