= Puran Mal =

Raja of Chanderi from 1529 to 1543

Raja of Chanderi
- Reign: 1529–January 1543
- Predecessor: Babur
- Successor: Sher Shah Suri
- Father: Silhadi

Raja Puran Mal (r. 1529 – January 1543) was a Rajput ruler of Chanderi and Raisen, present-day town in Madhya Pradesh, India, during the Mughal Empire and the Suri dynasty.

He defeated Babur's Mughal army at Chanderi in 1529 and occupied the Chanderi Fort. Negotiations were made after Sher Shah Suri's attack on the fort in 1542 but Puran Mal was killed by conspiracists.

Though numerous other sources offer a different account, in which after the six-month long siege of Raisen, Puran Mal surrendered to Sher Shah and was thereafter executed.

== Conflict with Babur ==
Babur attacked India in 1527 and Rajput kings of Rajasthan under the leadership of Rana Sanga of Mewar failed to stop him in Battle of Khanwa. The defeat of Rajput kings in Khanwa allowed Babur to capture a great portion of Indian territory, which included Chanderi. He is also noted to treat Hindus of Chanderi poorly. This was supposedly the reason why Puran Mal attacked Chanderi in 1529, defeated Mughal army of Babur and captured Chanderi fort. After this defeat, the Mughals left Chanderi and Puran Mal took over the control of Chanderi.

== Conflict with Sher Shah Suri ==
The Mughal Empire was defeated by Sur Empire of Sher Shah Suri.

In 1542, Sher Shah added Malwa to his empire. During this campaign, he ordered his amir Shujaat Khan to bring Puran Mal to his presence. Shujaat Khan conducted Puran Mal, who had taken with him 6,000 horsemen before Sher Shah, who at once presented his new ally with a hundred horses and a hundred splendid robes of honour and then sent him home. Puran Mal set out for the return journey to Raisen leaving his brother Chaturbhuj in the service of Sher Shah. This arrangement soon went away. In 1543, a year after the understanding between the Afghan sultan and the Puran Mal, Sher Shah took Chanderi from Puran Mal and then laid siege to his stronghold Raisen. As his motive for this campaign Sher Shah is said to have given vent to his anger against Puran Mal, ‘who had made captives of the families of Muslims in Chanderi’, had forcibly made their daughters to be the dancing-girls and had not co-operated with his son. The siege continued for six months with the fort coming under heavy bombardment. Artillery proved to be the deciding factor and Puran Mal had to negotiate once again with Sher Shah. The negotiations were soon successful. Sher Shah granted to Puran Mal the iqta of Benares.

== Death ==
A little afterwards the negotiation, a number of Muslim women of Chanderi presented themselves before Sher Shah on the road-side and complained to him about Puran Mal. ‘He has killed our husbands’, they said, ‘put in chains our daughters whom he caused to dance along with the dancing-girls and has seized all our lands and earthly possessions.’ They threatened to accuse the sultan on the day of resurrection if he did not revenge them and, when he reminded them of the ‘oaths and vows’ that had been taken to guarantee the safety of the king, they told him to consult the ulema of his camp. Apparently Sher Shah simply had to comply with this. The ulema got together and issued a fatwa deciding that Puran Mal deserved death. The camp of the sultan's new ally was now surrounded by elephants and troops. Seeing this, Puran Mal went into his tent and severed the head of his beloved wife, namely, Ratnavali, brought it before his dear and near ones and ordered them likewise to slay their families. In the ensuing fight, 10,000 Rajput soldiers laid down their lives fighting. Abul Fazl denounces Sher Shah for his dishonesty and calls the ulema misguided men. Historian Abbas Sarwani describes a scene of the battle thus, "While the Hindus were employed in putting their women and families to death, the Afghans on all sides commenced the slaughter of the Hindus. Puran Mal and his companions failed not to exhibit valour and gallantry, but in the twinkling of an eye all were slain." Only a few women and children survived. Puran Mal's daughter was given to minstrels to be a dancing girl while his three nephews were castrated. As an excuse for the treachery, Sher Shah claimed it as a revenge for enslavement of Muslim women and that he had once, when seriously ill, pledged to wipe out the Rajputs of Raisen.
