= Sher Shah Suri =

Afghan Sultan of Hindustan from 1540 to 1545

- Al-Sulṭān al-Āḍil (Note: al-Āḍil was a title donned by Sher Shah, meaning "the Just King".); Usṭāḍ-i-Bāḍshahān (Note: Humayun, the rival of Sher Shah Suri, referred to Sher Shah as Ustad-i-Badshahan, meaning "Teacher of Kings".); Hazraṭ-i-Āla
- Painting of Sher Shah Suri from a manuscript of Tarikh-e-Khandan-e-Timuriyah (dated between c. 1570–1590), prepared by the court painters of Mughal emperor Akbar

Sultan of Hindustan Sur Emperor (Note: Sher Shah held his first coronation on 6 April 1538 after he captured Gauda, the capital of the Bengal Sultanate. However, his second coronation took place on 17 May 1540, after he defeated Humayun at the Battle of Kannuaj. Historians dispute when the Sur Empire was founded as a result, and both dates are used in different sources.)
- Reign: 17 May 1540 – 22 May 1545
- Coronation: 17 May 1540; Kannauj
- Predecessor: Humayun (as Mughal Emperor)
- Successor: Islam Shah Suri

Sultan of Bengal and Bihar
- Reign: 6 April 1538 – 17 May 1540
- Coronation: 6 April 1538; Gauda
- Predecessor: Ghiyasuddin Mahmud Shah (as Sultan of Bengal)
- Successor: Position abolished (Himself as Sultan of Hindustan); Shamsuddin Muhammad Shah (1553)

Hazrat-i-Ala of Bihar
- Reign: 1530 – 6 April 1538
- Predecessor: Jalal Khan Lohani
- Successor: Position abolished (Himself as Sultan of Bengal and Bihar)
- Born: Farid Khan Sur; 1472 or 1486; Sasaram, Bihar, Delhi Sultanate
- Died: 22 May 1545 (aged 73 or 59); Kalinjar, Bundelkhand, Sur Empire
- Burial: Tomb of Sher Shah Suri, Sasaram
- Spouse: Rani Shah (m. 1506) Lad Malika (m. 1530) Guhar Gusain (m. 1530)
- Issue: Qutb Khan Suri; Adil Khan Suri; Jalal Khan Suri
Names
- Farid al-Din Khan (فرید الدین خان)
- House: Sur
- Dynasty: Suri
- Father: Hasan Khan Sur
- Religion: Sunni Islam
- Seal
- Military career
- Allegiance: Sur Empire
- Branch: Sur Army
- Conflicts: See list: Battle of Ghaghra (1529); Acquisition of Chunar (1530); Siege of Chunar (1532); Battle of Surajgarh (1534); Siege of Gauda (1538); Battle of Chausa (1539); Battle of Kannauj (1540); Siege of Raisen (1542–1543); Battle of Sammel (1544); Siege of Kalinjar (1545)

Farid al-Din Sher Shah (Note: Persian: فرید الدین شیر شاه) (Farid Khan Sur; 1472/1486 – 22 May 1545), better known as Sher Shah Suri, (Note: Pashto: ﺷﯧﺮ ﺷﺎﻩ ﺳﻮﺭﻱ; Persian: شیرشاه سوری) was the Sultan of Hindustan also known by his title Sultan Adil (lit. 'the Just King'), as the first Sur Emperor, from 1540 until his death in 1545. Prior to his ascension, he also served as the regent, and later Sultan of Bihar (1530–1540) and Bengal (1538–1540). He established the Sur Empire after defeating the Mughal Empire and declaring Delhi his seat of power. The influence of his innovations and reforms extended far beyond his brief reign, being recognized as one of the greatest administrative rulers in India. Sher Shah is renowned as one of the most skillful Afghan generals in history, and by the end of his reign, his empire covered nearly all of Northern India.

Born between 1472 and 1486 and given the name Farid Khan, his early childhood saw him flee from home due to internal family strife. He pursued an education in Jaunpur, where his rise to power began after his father offered him a managerial position over his jagirs. Sher Shah effectively governed these territories, gaining a reputation for his reforms that brought prosperity to the region. However, due to family intrigues, he eventually relinquished his position over the jagirs. Sher Shah then moved to Agra, where he stayed until his father's death. This event allowed him to return to his family's jagirs and take control, thereby solidifying his leadership and furthering his rise to power.

Sher Shah spent time in Agra after the Mughals gained power, observing the leadership of Babur. After leaving Agra, he entered the service of the governor of Bihar. Following the governor's death in 1528, Sher Shah obtained a high position in Bihar and, by 1530, became the regent and de facto ruler of the kingdom. He engaged in conflicts with the local nobility and the Sultanate of Bengal. In 1538, while Mughal Emperor Humayun was engaged in military campaigns elsewhere, Sher Shah overran the Bengal Sultanate and established the Suri dynasty. He defeated the Mughals and drove them out of India, establishing himself as emperor in Delhi. As ruler of Hindustan, Sher Shah led numerous military campaigns, conquering Punjab, Malwa, Marwar, Mewar, and Bundelkhand. A brilliant strategist, Sher Shah was both a gifted administrator and a capable general. His reorganization of the empire and strategic innovations laid the foundations for future Mughal emperors, notably Akbar. Sher Shah died in May 1545 while besieging Kalinjar fort. Following his death, the empire descended into civil war until it was eventually re-conquered by the Mughals.

During his rule as Emperor of the Sur Empire, Sher Shah implemented numerous economic, administrative, and military reforms. He issued the first Rupiya, organized the postal system of the Indian subcontinent, as well as extending the Grand Trunk Road from Chittagong in Bengal to Kabul in Afghanistan, significantly improving trade. Sher Shah further developed Humayun's Dina-panah city, renaming it Shergarh, and revived the historical city of Pataliputra, which had been in decline since the 7th century CE, as Patna. Additionally, he embarked on several military campaigns that restored Afghan prominence in India.

== Name and title ==
His birth name was Farid al-Din Khan. After 1526, he was conferred the title Sher Khan, and following his ascension as Sultan of Hindustan in 1540, he became known as Sher Shah. His full title was Al‑Sultān al‑ʿĀdil Abū’l‑Muzzafar Farīd al‑Dunyā wa’d‑Dīn Sher Shah Khallada Allāhu Mulkahu wa Saltanahu. (Note: السلطان العادل ابوالمظفر فرید الدنیا و الدین شیر شاہ خلد اللہ ملکہ و سلطنہ)

His surname 'Suri' was taken from his Pashtun Sur tribe. He was a distant kinsman to Babur's brother-in-law, Mir Shah Jamal, who remained loyal to Humayun. The name Sher (means lion in Persian and tiger in Indo-Persian) was conferred upon him for his courage when, as a young man, he killed a tiger that leapt suddenly upon the governor of Bihar, Behar Khan Lohani.

== Early life and origin (1472/1486–1497) ==
Sher Shah was born in Sasaram, located in present-day Bihar, India. His birthdate is disputed, with some accounts stating he was born in 1472, while others claim 1486. He was a Pashtun/Afghan, belonging to the Sur clan.

Sher Shah's grandfather, Ibrahim Khan Sur, migrated from the region of Roh in present-day Afghanistan in the reign of Bahlol Lodi and began his career as a horse trader, eventually becoming a landlord (Jagirdar) in the Narnaul area of present-day Haryana. He represented his patron, Jamal Khan Lodi Sarangkhani, who assigned him several villages in Hissar Firoza. Sher Shah's father, Hasan Khan Sur, entered the service of Jamal Khan. In 1494, Jamal Khan was promoted and established in Bihar by Sikandar Khan Lodi. At Jamal Khan's request, Sikandar granted Hasan the jagirs of Khwaspur, Sasaram, and Hajipur in Bihar.

Hasan had several wives and fathered over eight sons, with Nizam Khan being Sher Shah's only full brother. His step-brothers were Sulaiman, Ahmad and Muda who were from a concubine. One of Sher Shah's stepmothers was cruel to him, and Hasan, being too submissive to his wife, was unable to intervene. As a result, Sher Shah sought refuge with Jamal Khan, aiming to gain experience and further his education.

Sher Shah pursued his education in Jaunpur for several years, studying subjects such as history and religion. On one occasion, Hasan visited Jamal Khan in Jaunpur and encountered some of Sher Shah's relatives, who spoke of Sher Shah's potential for future greatness. Impressed by these accounts, Hasan invited Sher Shah to manage his domains in 1497.

=== Rise to power (1497–1528) ===
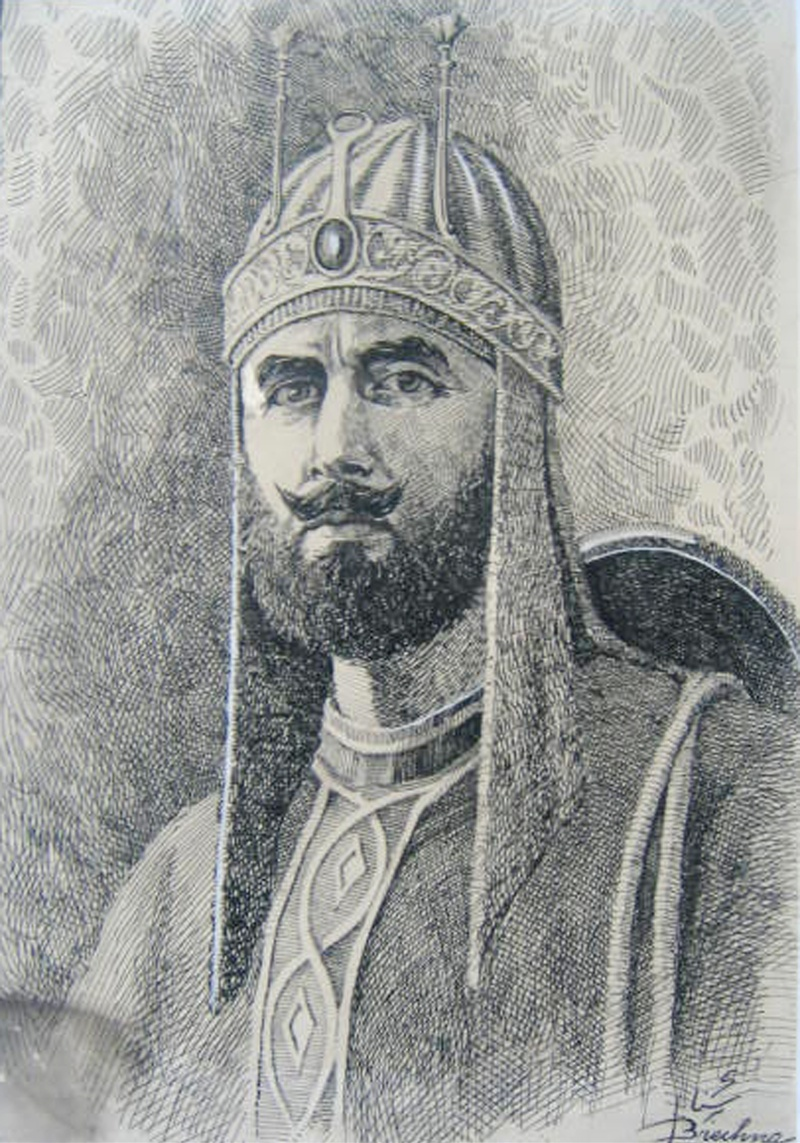
Imagined sketch of Sher Shah Suri by Afghan artist Abdul Ghafoor Breshna

Sher Shah accepted his father's offer and embarked on implementing numerous reforms. His early administrative career focused on combating corruption. One of Sher Shah's significant reforms as administrator of his father's domains was the assessment of land revenues, along with defining and establishing commissions for tax collectors. However, despite these reforms, Sher Shah faced resentment and intrigue from his stepmother, who had initially forced him to flee, and his step-brothers. This opposition eventually led to Sher Shah resigning from his post in 1518, after serving as manager for 21 years. Following his resignation, he initially engaged in banditry before departing for Agra, which was under the rule of the Lodi dynasty of the Delhi Sultanate and gained the support of Daulat Khan Lodi.

Sher Shah remained in Agra until his father's death, after which he received his father's jagirs from Sultan Ibrahim Khan Lodi which were initially held by his step-brother Sulaiman Khan. Returning to his jagirs in 1520–21, Sher Shah began administering them while in the service of Behar Khan Lohani. Conflict emerged however over the split of his father's land between his brothers, and Muhammad Khan Sur initially drove Sher Shah from the estate by defeating one of his governors. In 1526, the Lodis were overthrown, bringing the Mughals to power under Babur. During this time, Behar Khan Lohani established an independent state in Bihar and assumed the title of Sultan Muhammad. With the aid of Junaid Khan, the Mughal governor of Jaunpur, Sher Shah joined Mughal service. In April 1527, after Babur launched a campaign against the Afghans in Bihar, Sher Shah distinguished himself, and his estates were restored in 1528.

With his jagirs secured, Sher Shah accompanied Junaid Khan to Agra, where he met Mughal Emperor Babur. During this time, Sher Shah was conferred the title of Sher Khan after killing a tiger that leapt upon the ruler of Bihar. Sher Shah remained in Agra, observing Mughal military organization and administration.

Once, while dining with Mughal Emperor Babur, Sher Shah encountered a dish he was unfamiliar with eating. In response, he drew his dagger, cut the dish into smaller pieces, and then ate it with a spoon. Babur took notice and informed his minister, Mir Khalifa:

Keep an eye on Sher Khan, he is a clever man and the marks of royalty are visible on his forehead. I have seen many Afghan nobles, greater men than he, but they never made an impression on me, but as soon as I saw this man, it entered into my mind that he ought to be arrested for I find in him the qualities of greatness and the marks of mightiness.

— Babur

Suspecting a rising plot against him, Sher Shah departed Agra and left Mughal service, returning to his Jagirs in 1528. He sought refuge under the protection of Sultan Muhammad of Bihar. Upon Sher Shah's arrival, he was warmly received and appointed as the guardian of Muhammad's son, Jalal Khan.

== Reign in Bihar (1528–1538/1540) ==
In October 1528, Sultan Mohammad of Bihar died, and his queen, Dudu Bibi, assumed the role of regent. Sher Shah was appointed as her deputy governor, allowing him to begin consolidating his position in the region through a myriad of military and administrative reforms. These reforms significantly strengthened his position, making him one of the most influential Afghan leaders in India.

In 1529, Sher Shah anticipated joining Mahmud Lodi, the younger brother of Ibrahim Lodi, in his insurrection against the Mughals that rallied most of the significant Afghan leaders in India. Sher Shah, however, recognized the division among the Afghans and Mahmud's incompetence, thus refusing to aid Mahmud. Intending for the unification of all Afghan leaders, Mahmud marched with his army to Sasaram, persuading Sher Shah to join the rebellion. Hesitatingly, Sher Shah accompanied the expedition with his own set of men, and the insurrection initially succeeded, capturing Ghazipur and Banaras. However, upon the arrival of Mughal forces, Mahmud Lodi abandoned the army. After this, many Afghan nobles including Sher Shah submitted to Babur. In early 1530, the death of Dudu Bibi enabled Sher Shah to become the regent for Jalal Khan, effectively making him the de facto ruler of Bihar.

Despite his growing power, many of the Lohani nobles opposed Sher Shah's dominance. Although he offered to share power, the Lohani nobles rejected his proposal and instead fled to Bengal with Jalal Khan, seeking the support of Nasiruddin Nasrat Shah, the ruler of the Bengal Sultanate. Consequently, Sher Shah became the sole ruler of Bihar. However, he did not adopt any grand titles, preferring to style himself as Hazrat-i-Ala.

== Afghan nationalism ==
Modern historians, notably Kalika Ranjan Qanungo and Iqtidar Husain Siddiqui, have characterized Sher Shah Suri's state-building strategy as an early form of Afghan proto-nationalism, wherein he deliberately mobilized shared ethnic solidarity and tribal honor to unite fractious Pashtun clans against the Mughals. Following the collapse of the Lodi dynasty at the First Battle of Panipat (1526), Sher Shah recognized that chronic inter-tribal rivalries among major clans—such as the Lohanis, Farmulis, Nuhanis, and Niazis—had caused the loss of Afghan sovereignty in northern India.

=== Ideological mobilization ===
According to the late-16th-century chronicle Tarikh-i-Sher Shahi by Abbas Khan Sarwani, Sher Shah consciously deployed ethno-nationalist rhetoric to rally rival Afghan nobles behind his leadership:

- Assertion of martial equality: Seeking to erase the demoralization caused by Babur's conquests, Sher Shah famously reminded his followers that "Afghans/Pashtuns were never inferior to the Mughals in sword-wielding," asserting that they had lost Hindustan solely due to their own internal disunity and mutual jealousy.
- Collective restoration: He framed his campaigns against Humayun not merely as personal ambition, but as a collective struggle to reclaim Afghan dominion from foreign usurpers, warning wavering chiefs that submission to the Mughals would reduce all Afghans to servitude.
- Recruitment from Roh: To expand his army and counterbalance entrenched Afghan grandees, Sher Shah issued direct appeals to Pashtun tribes in Roh (modern-day Khyber Pakhtunkhwa and eastern Afghanistan), inviting his kinsmen to migrate to India with promises of stipends, land grants, and shared imperial prestige.

=== Centralization over tribalism ===
While leveraging Pashtun ethnic solidarity to seize power, Sher Shah refused to restore the loose tribal confederacy of the Lodi era once enthroned. He curtailed the hereditary autonomy of tribal chiefs, treating them as salaried officials of the crown, and replaced purely tribal levies with a centrally paid standing army—balancing Afghan ethnic supremacy at the top with a centralized imperial administration.

=== Acquisition of Chunar (1530) ===
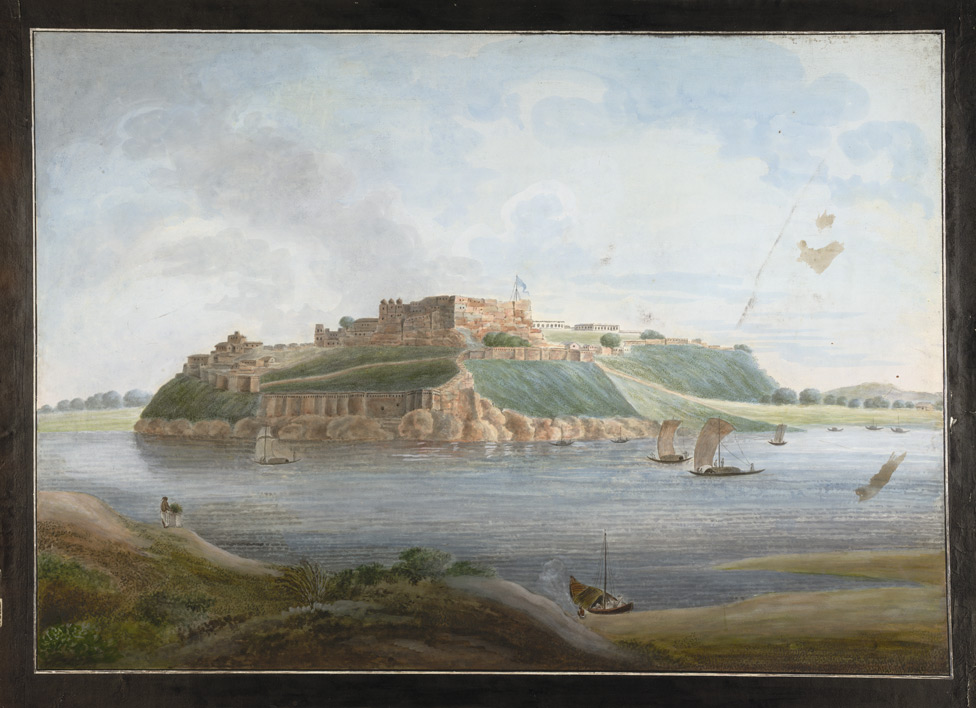
View of Chunar fort from the north across the Ganges river

Taj Khan, the governor of Chunar, was assassinated by his stepson. In the aftermath, his wealthy widow, Lad Malika, sought a protector to secure her position. Recognizing Sher Shah's growing influence, she agreed to marry him. Through these negotiations, which were kept secret from Taj Khan's sons, Sher Shah gained control of Chunar. This acquisition significantly bolstered Sher Shah's power and influence in the region, as he now controlled a significant fort and a large treasury.

=== First conflict with the Mughals (1530–1532) ===
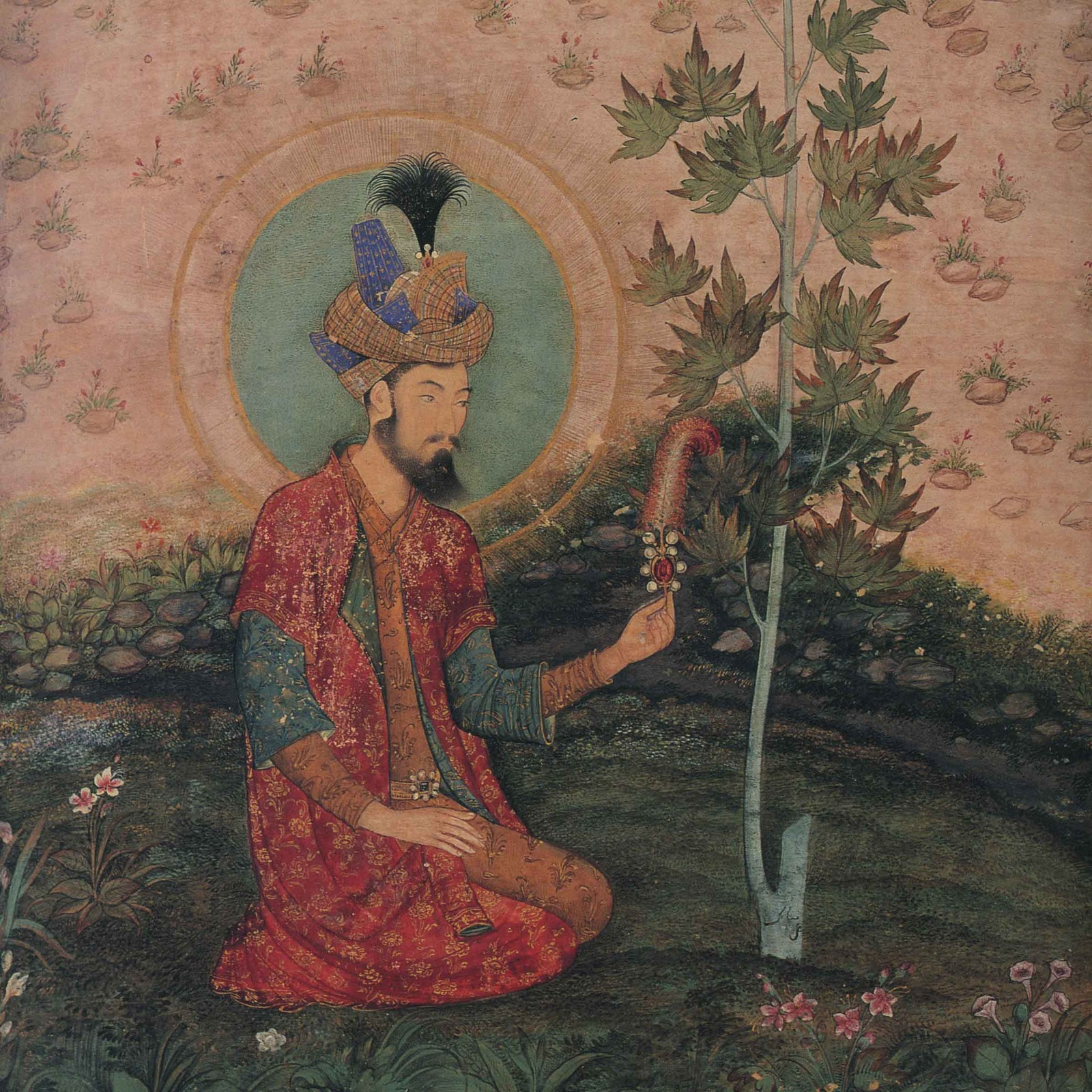
Portrait of Mughal Emperor Humayun seated in a garden

The death of Mughal Emperor Babur in December 1530 saw the Afghan insurrection rejuvenated, and Mahmud Lodi again returned. Sher Shah immediately ignored Mahmud's attempts of garnering Sher Shah's aid until he was promised all of Southern Bihar. After further being visited by Mahmud, Sher Shah acquiesced. The combined Afghan forces marched on Banaras and Jaunpur, with Junaid Khan withdrawing to Agra. The Afghan forces followed up their victories by seizing Lucknow.

Humayun, entrenched in a siege of Kalinjar, immediately withdrew, crossing the Ganges and began a battle against Mahmud Lodi at Dadrah in 1531. The Afghan forces were decisively defeated, and the coalition was shattered. Mahmud Lodi fled to Orrisa, while Sher Shah emerged on top by keeping Southern Bihar.

Humayun followed up his victory by besieging Chunar, a fortress owned by Sher Shah, in September 1532. The siege continued for over four months to no avail. In order to make peace, Sher Shah offered his loyalty to the Mughals on the condition that he remained in control of Chunar, offering to send his third son, Qutb Khan, as hostage. Humayun accepted and lifted the siege in December 1532, returning to Agra due to the rising threat of Bahadur Shah, the ruler of the Gujarat Sultanate. Humayun did not wish to split up his forces under the command of a noble to continue the siege, as this would split his strength, additionally giving reason for peace to be established.

=== Lohani conflict and Bengal campaign (1533–1537) ===
Makhdum Alam, the administrator of Hajipur, refused to recognize Ghiyasuddin Mahmud Shah as the Sultan of Bengal, accusing him of assassinating the previous Sultan, Alauddin Firuz. He formed an alliance with Sher Shah, who saw this as an opportunity to crush the power of the Lohani nobles allied with Mahmud Shah. Mahmud Shah sent several expeditions against Sher Shah, which were all defeated. Makhdum Alam however, was killed, and his estates fell to Sher Shah upon his death. In 1534, Mahmud Shah sent an army of artillery, cavalry and infantry under Ibrahim Khan to conquer Bihar, with Jalal Khan accompanying the campaign. However, Sher Shah launched a sudden attack on the combined forces of the Lohani chiefs of Bihar and Mahmud Shah of Bengal, defeating them at Surajgarh in March 1534, winning a decisive victory. Ibrahim Khan was killed during the battle, and Jalal Khan was forced to retreat to Bengal. Following the victory, Sher Shah consolidated his control over Bihar.

Between 1536 and 1537, Sher Shah followed up his victories by invading Bengal and defeating Mahmud Shah numerous times, occupying all lands west of the Teliagarhi pass. Mahmud Shah repeatedly requested the Portuguese to aid him, which they did by fortifying the Teliaghari and Sakrigali passes. Sher Shah, however, out-flanked the combined armies and reached Gauda by way of Jharkhand. Mahmud Shah immediately capitulated, and was forced to pay over 13,000,000 gold coins, and cede territory up to Sakrigali.

=== Second Bengal campaign and conflict with the Mughals (1537–1540) ===
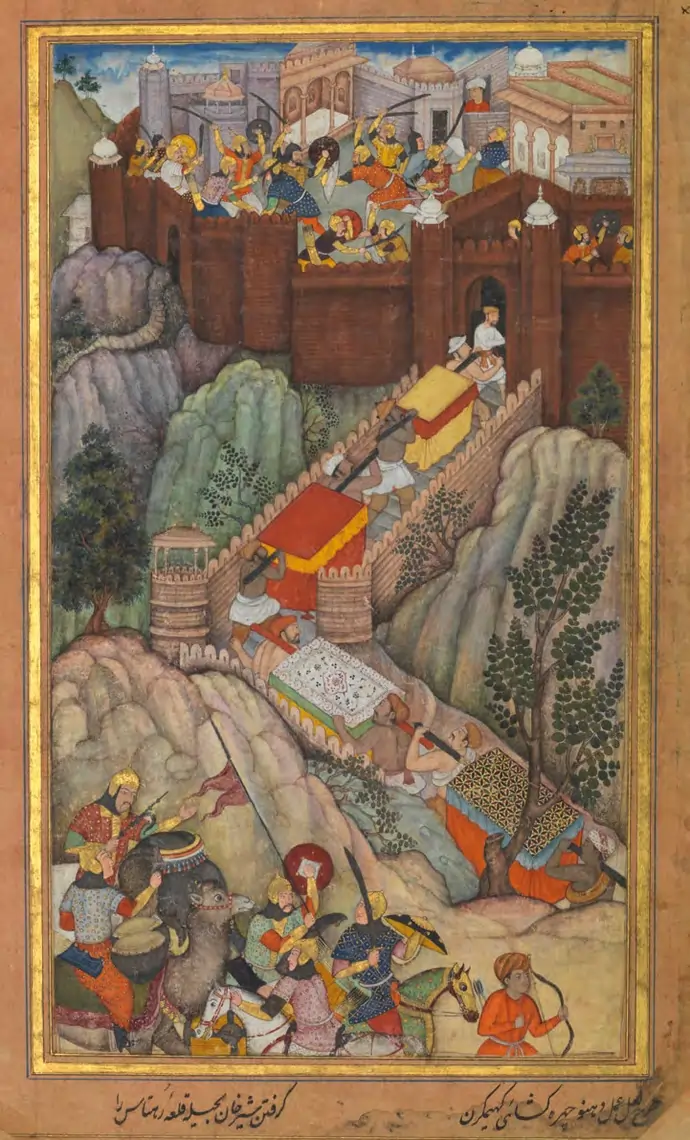
Depiction of Sher Shah's capture of Rohtasgarh fort through stratagem

Eager to conquer the Bengal Sultanate, Sher Shah prepared for another invasion, and an opportunity came when Mahmud Shah failed to send annual tribute, forcing him to seek refuge in Gaur and frantically ask Humayun for aid. In response, Humayun mobilized a Mughal army in July 1537, and advanced towards Chunar. The Mughals reached the fort in November 1537 and laid siege to it. The siege lasted over six months before the fort finally fell. Following this, Sher Shah began a second invasion into Bengal, seizing Rohtasgarh in March 1538 through stratagem. He used Rohtasgarh to situate Afghan families and loot he obtained during the war. Following up his victory, Sher Shah besieged Gauda, which fell in April 1538. Split detachments would also be sent to conquer Chittagong. Another force battled against Mahmud Shah led by Khawas Khan Marwat, a general of Sher Shah, which saw Mahmud Shah decisively defeated and mortally wounded. With these victories, Sher Shah held his first coronation.

After the fall of Gauda, Sher Shah offered favorable peace terms to Humayun, proposing to pay 1,000,000 dinars, and cede Bihar in exchange for control of Bengal. Humayun refused the offer, not wishing to leave Bengal's rich resources to a hostile state. Additionally, the wounded Mahmud Shah, who had entered Humayun's camp, urged him to continue the war against Sher Shah. Mahmud Shah died from his wounds soon after.

Following this, Humayun marched towards Bengal to confront Sher Shah. However, the Mughal army was troubled with heavy rains, causing the loss of their baggage between Patna and Monghyr. Humayun eventually reached Gauda and seized it without opposition on 8 September 1538. However, the city had been abandoned by the Afghans, and the treasury looted. Humayun remained in Gauda for months, restoring order to the city, as he was trapped with his army due to the weather. Sher Shah capitalized on this, seizing Bihar and Varanasi, reclaiming control over Chunar, and laying siege to Jaunpur. Other detachments of the Afghan army extended as far as Kannauj. As a result, Humayun found himself effectively stranded in Gauda with no lines of communication. Learning of unrest in Agra, Humayun immediately sought to settle for peace with Sher Shah. However, as he crossed the Karmanasa River, where his army was vulnerable to attack, Sher Shah capitalized on the Mughal army's fragile state and attacked at the Battle of Chausa. The Afghans descended on the Mughal army, which was 200,000 strong. Overwhelmed, the Mughal army was completely routed. Humayun barely escaped with his life, with the Mughals suffering over 7,000 casualties, including many prominent noblemen.

With his defeat, Humayun returned to Agra, and restored order after unrest began due to his brother, Hindal Mirza. Humayun then began mobilizing another army and advanced against Sher Shah, who raised his own army, although being numerically inferior. The two armies met at Kannuaj, mirroring each other across the Ganges river. Humayun crossed the river and engaged in skirmishes with Sher Shah's forces. During the fighting, many of Humayun's nobles hid their insignia to avoid recognition by the Afghans, and several fled the battle. The Mughal army was ultimately defeated, forcing Humayun to flee. Following this victory, Sher Shah was crowned a second time on 17 May 1540, being declared the ruler of Hindustan and adopting the epithet Sultan Adil, meaning "Just King." He further took on the name Sher Shah.

== Reign as Sur emperor (1540–1545) ==
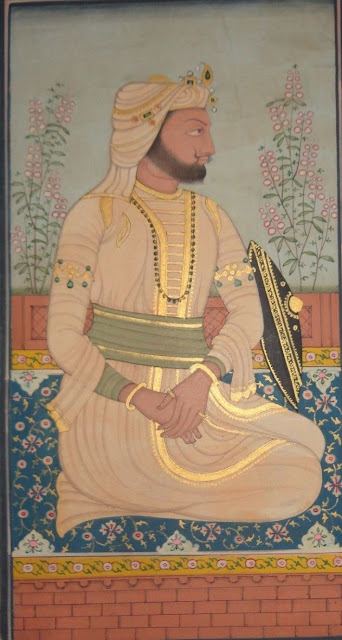
Illustration of Sher Shah Suri

=== Consolidation and Punjab campaign (1540–1542) ===
As Humayun fled, Sher Shah pursued him with split detachments. He then seized Agra, defeating the Mughals there, and sent Khawas in pursuit of Humayun. The pursuit and flight of Humayun allowed Sher Shah to capture and enter Delhi, beginning the consolidation of his rule there by reorganizing its administration. As Humayun reached Lahore in July 1540, the Afghans were at Sultanpur Lodhi. With the approach of the Afghans, the Mughals fled Lahore. At Khushab, Humayun and Kamran quarreled and parted ways, with Humayun leaving for Sindh, and Kamran to Kabul.

As Humayun began withdrawing, Khawas Khan initially gave up the pursuit, halting on the Jhelum river. Sher Shah then advanced from Sirhind toward Lahore, and then continued toward the Chenab river before arriving at Khushab. At Khushab, Sher Shah sent two detachments under Khawas Khan and Qutb Khan to pursue Humayun and his contingent out of the region. The pursuit continued as far as the Panjnad River before withdrawing back to Khushab and merging with Sher Shah's force.

Remaining encamped at Khushab, Sher Shah received the submission of Baloch chiefs, including prominently Ismail Khan, Fateh Khan, Ghazi Khan, and many others who inhabited the region between the Chenab and the Indus rivers. Sher Shah then entered into conflict with the Gakhars, who had historically been difficult to subjugate despite attempts by previous rulers. Sher Shah initially attempted diplomacy, inviting the Gakhar chief Sarang Khan to acknowledge him as the emperor of India. However, he gave an insulting response, which enraged Sher Shah. In retaliation, Sher Shah marched through Punjab, subjugating the Gakhars, devastating much of the countryside, and taking many prisoners. To further secure his rule, Sher Shah established Rohtas Fort and stationed 50,000 men in Punjab under his generals Haibat Khan Niazi and Khawas Khan Marwat. Subsequently, Sher Shah turned his attention to Bengal, where the governor he had appointed had become rebellious.

=== Reforms in Bengal (1541) ===
Recognizing the importance of Bengal, Sher Shah focused much of his administrative efforts in the region. In March 1541, Khizr Khan, the governor of Bengal under Sher Shah, led a revolt, as well as marrying a daughter of the former Sultan, Mahmud Shah. Sher Shah mobilized an army and personally led it to defeat Khizr Khan, restoring Bengal to his suzerainty. He then divided Bengal into 47 smaller administrative divisions, each overseen by a shiqdar, with Qazi Fazilat established as the chief supervisor of the Muqtars. These reforms increased the prominence of Afghans in Bengal, leading many to settle in the region. Some of these Afghan settlers later established the Muhammad Shahi dynasty, which ruled Bengal from 1553 to 1563, and the Karrani dynasty, which ruled from 1563 to 1576.

=== Conquest and consolidation of Malwa (1542) ===
In 1542, Sher Shah embarked on a campaign to Malwa. Qadir Khan, the ruler of the Malwa Sultanate, had offended Sher Shah by claiming he was equal to him, as well as failing pledged aid against the Mughals. Upon arriving in Gwalior, the governor of the city submitted to the Afghans. The Afghan army continued their march to Sarangpur. Believing defeat was imminent, Qadir Khan left Ujjain and awaited at Sarangpur for Sher Shah's arrival. Sher Shah received him, and they together advanced into Ujjain. Sher Shah then made Qadir Khan the governor of Gauda. However, suspicious of Sher Shah's intentions, Qadir Khan fled to Gujarat, leaving Malwa annexed to Sher Shah's domain.

Sher Shah consolidated his new territories before returning to Agra, also receiving submission from the ruler of Ranthambore. Shujaat Khan was appointed as the new governor of Malwa, with further attempts from Qadir Khan to reclaim Malwa ending in failure against Shujaat Khan.

=== Conquest of Raisen (1543) ===
After the death of Bahadur Shah of Gujarat, Puran Mal regained control of Raisen, which had been annexed by Bahadur Shah in 1532. Following the re-capture of the city, Puran Mal was accused of committing tyrannies unto the Muslim populace, which Puran Mal denied. After assembling an army, the Rajputs, facing defeat, surrendered under the promise of safe conduct. Puran Mal withdrew from the fort with 4,000 Rajputs, including their families. However, after being ill-advised by fanatic Muslims, as well as Muslim widows appealing to him after allegedly suffering under Puran Mal's rule, Sher Shah gave permission for the Afghan army to attack the Rajputs while they were still leaving the fort. The Rajputs killed their women and children before engaging in battle with the Afghans, before being defeated as the Afghans massacred them. This act is considered the darkest mark on Sher Shah's reign.

=== Conquest of Marwar (1543–1544) ===
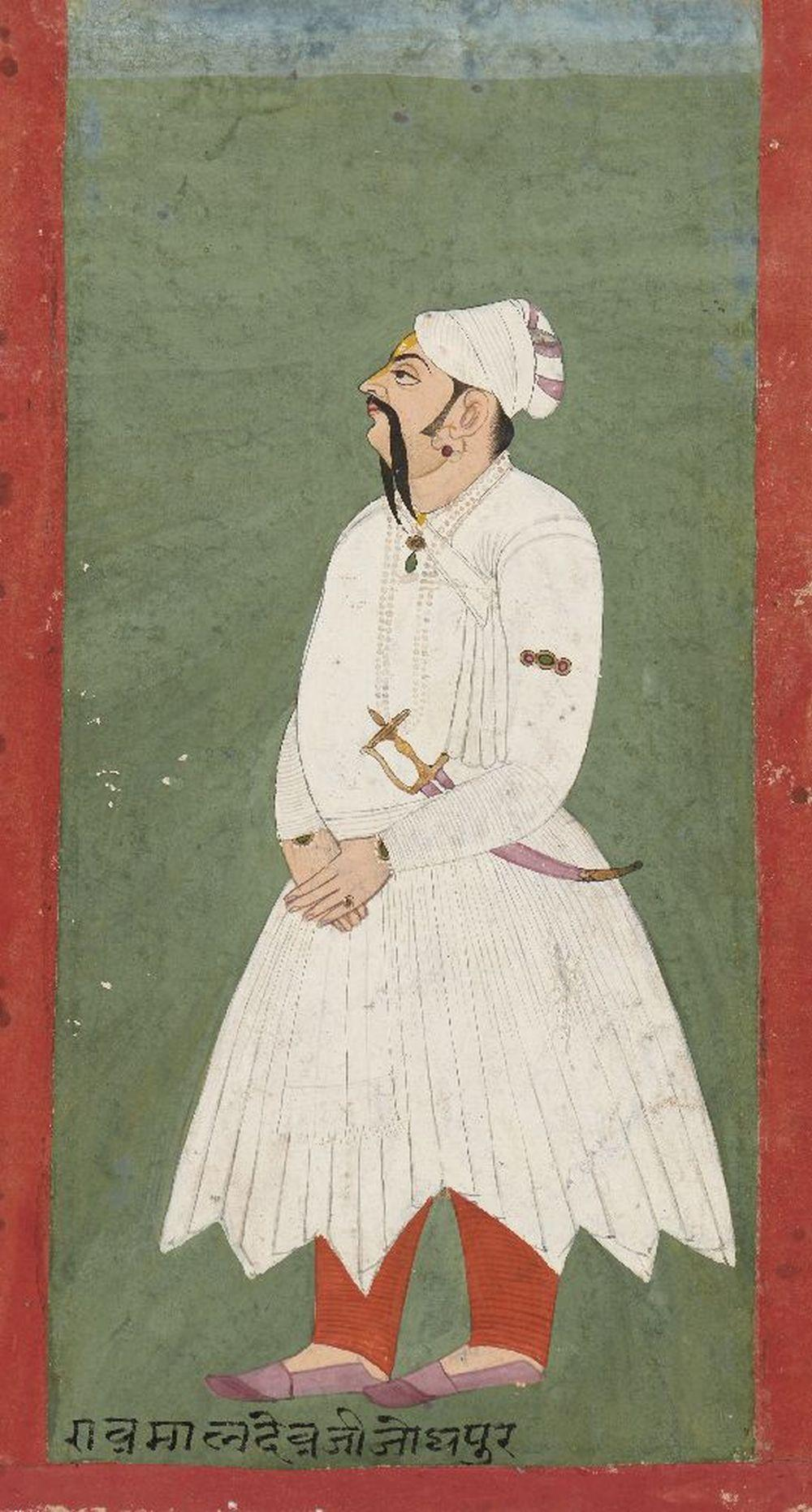
Portrait of Rao Maldeo Rathore

Having initially attempted to aid Humayun in regaining his throne, as well as having failed to capture Humayun for Sher Shah, and Marwar itself being a formidable kingdom and threat to his rule, Sher Shah began preparing for war in August 1542.

In early 1543, Sher Shah Suri, with a force of 80,000 cavalry, set out against Maldeo Rathore, the Rajput king of Marwar. The Afghan army advanced through Merta before Maldeo advanced with his own army of 50,000 to face Sher Shah, which had halted in the village of Sammel in the pargana of Jaitaran, near Jodhpur. Establishing defenses, Sher Shah's strong position made it difficult for Maldeo to launch an attack, while Sher Shah's position became dangerous due to supply difficulties for his large army. Sher Shah thus resorted to intrigue by dropping forged letters near Maldeo's camp, falsely indicating that some of his commanders intended to defect to the Afghans. This caused great distress to Maldeo, leading him to abandon his commanders and retreat to Jodhpur with his men.

Maldeo's generals, Jaita and Kumpa, split off a contingent of 12,000 men to fight against the Afghans. In the resulting Battle of Sammel, Sher Shah emerged victorious. Following the victory, Khawas Khan Marwat took possession of Jodhpur and occupied the territory of Marwar from Ajmer to Mount Abu in 1544, with Bikaner also submitting to Afghan rule. Maldeo was initially forced to retreat to Siwana, however after the death of Sher Shah he was able to recapture Jodhpur by July 1545 and the rest of his territories by 1546. In doing so he had to defeat the chain of garrisons that had been posted by Sher Shah before his death.

== Death (1545) ==
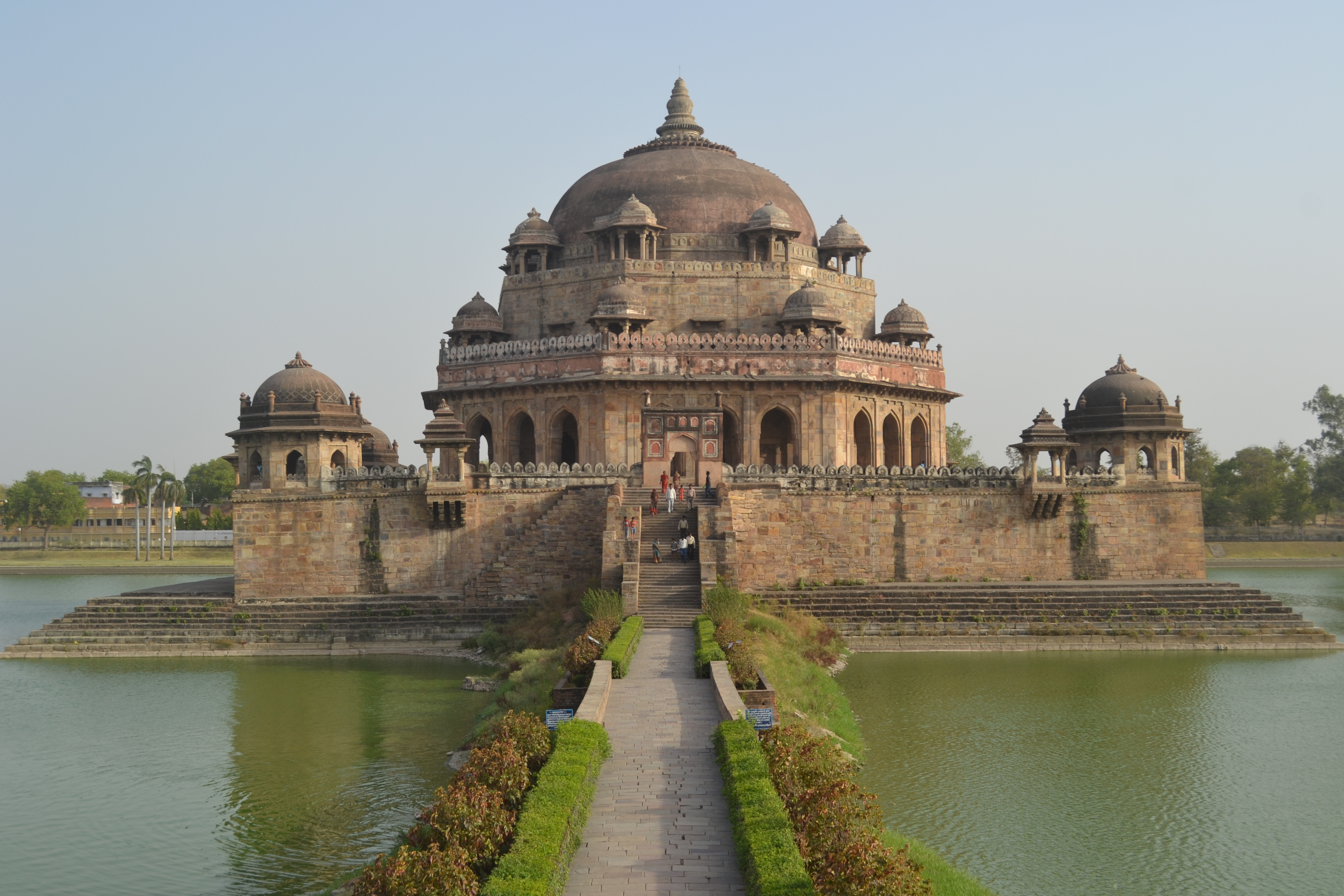
Tomb of Sher Shah Suri at Sasaram

Following the conquest of Marwar, Sher Shah besieged Kalinjar Fort in 1544. Due to continuous resistance from the Rajputs, he besieged the fort for seven months. The circumstances regarding Sher Shah's death are uncertain. Some sources state that he was mortally wounded by a gunpowder explosion when one of his cannons burst. Another account suggests that during a battle, as he descended from a rampart and ordered his men to hurl bombs into the fort, one bomb fell back and hit a cache of bombs, causing a large explosion. Some people escaped with minor burns, while Sher Shah was found half-burned and taken to his tent, where he remained for two days. Despite his critical condition, he ordered his men to swarm the fort, advancing close to the fort with his troops. Upon hearing that the fort had finally fallen, he remarked, "Thanks to Almighty god." Sher Shah succumbed to his wounds and died on 22 May 1545, at the age of 73 or 59.

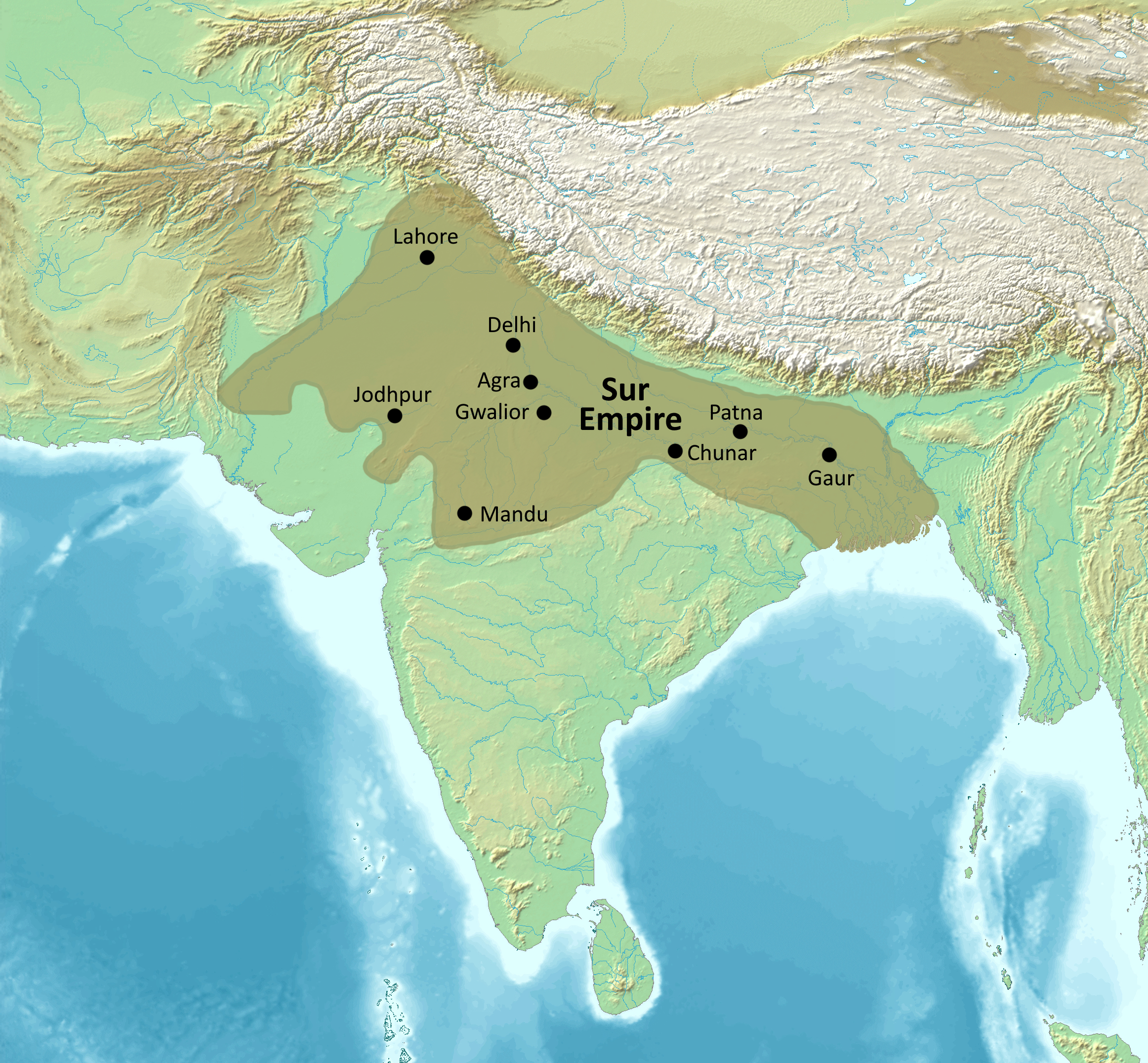
The Sur Empire at its height prior to the death of Sher Shah c. 1545

At the end of his reign, Sher Shah's empire spanned nearly the entirety of Northern India, excluding Assam, Kashmir, Gujarat, and the North-West Frontier Province. Sher Shah's heir apparent was his eldest son, Adil Khan. However, Jalal Khan was more favored by the nobility and seen as more experienced. As a result, Jalal Khan was invited by the nobility to be crowned, becoming Sher Shah's successor, and taking the regnal name Islam Shah Suri. Sher Shah was buried in the tomb of Sher Shah Suri, which stands in the middle of an artificial lake at Sasaram, a town on the Grand Trunk Road. The tomb finished its construction on 16 August 1545, three months after his death.

Hermann Goetz posited that one of the motivations for Sher Shah choosing his birthplace, Sasaram, as the site of his tomb, was that:

For Sher Shah ... [Sasaram] was the very symbol of his life and glory.

Decades after his death, the Tarikh-i-Sher Shahi was commissioned by Akbar to detail the reign of Sher Shah. Written by Abbas Sarwani, the source was significant toward detailing the conquest of Bengal by Sher Shah as well as the magnitude of his reforms, and greatly benefited in contribution towards the history of medieval India.

== Children and succession ==
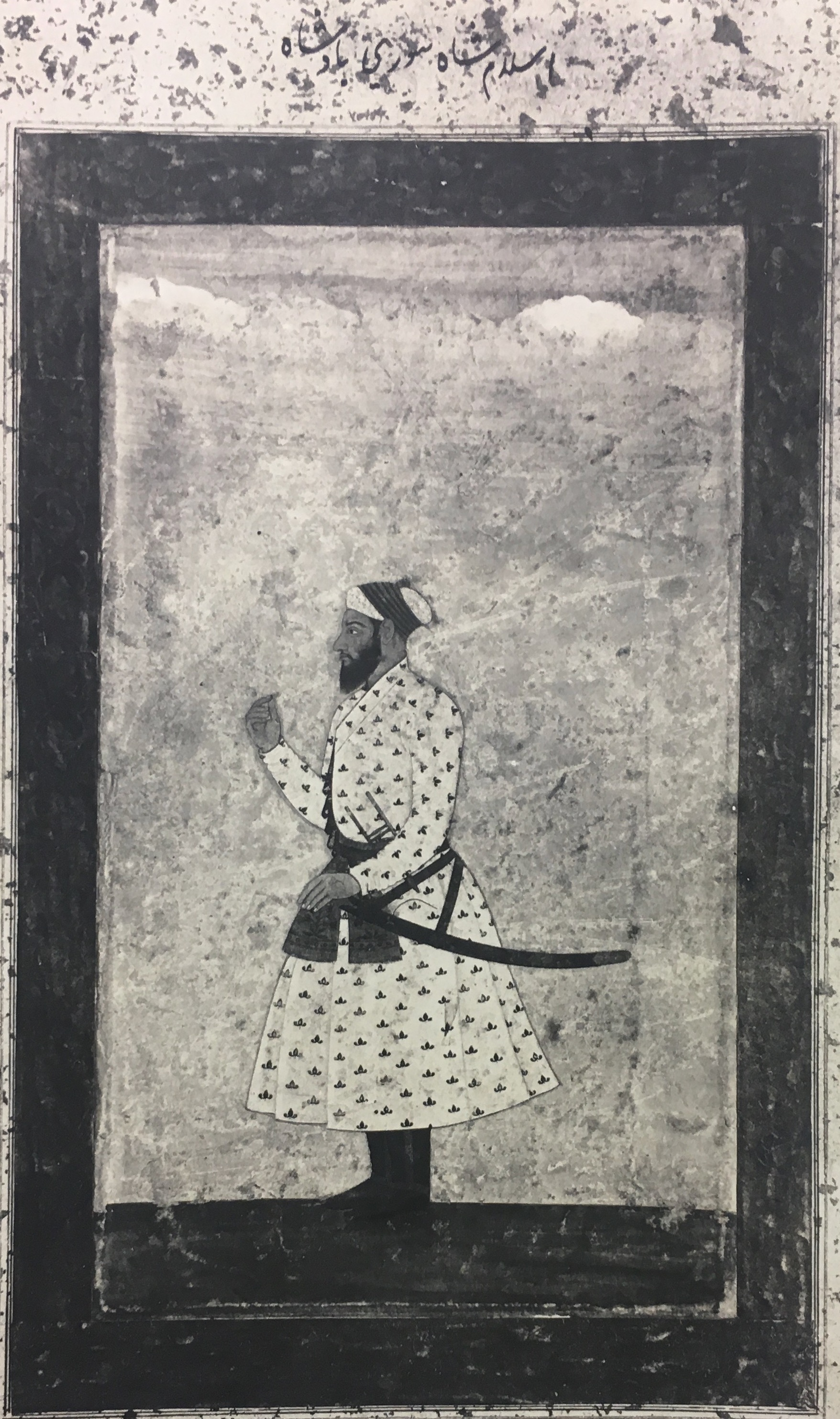
Illustration of Islam Shah Suri, son and successor of Sher Shah

Sher Shah's oldest son, Qutb Khan, was killed in a battle against Mughals in Malwa. Sher Shah had two surviving sons upon his death, Jalal Khan (known as Islam Shah Suri), and Adil Khan. Conflict emerged after Sher Shah's death and Islam Shah was victorious after a battle at Agra, with Adil Khan fleeing and his fate unknown. Islam Shah would rule until his death in 1553, being succeeded by his minor son, Firuz Shah Suri who was assassinated by Muhammad Adil Shah, a nephew of Sher Shah from his full brother, Nizam Khan.

The turbulence of succession and the instability afterward in the reign of Adil Shah unraveled the Sur Empire, including the rise of many military adventurers such as Taj Khan Karrani in Bihar, Ibrahim Shah Suri in Bayana, Sikandar Shah Suri in Lahore, and Muhammad Khan Sur in Bengal.

Initially having aborted an attempt against Islam Shah in 1553, Humayun returned to invade India. Capitalizing off of the instability to invade the Punjab, Mughal forces seized Lahore without opposition due to the civil war, and Afghan forces were defeated at Machhiwara. Sikander Shah attempted to give battle to Humayun at Sirhind before being defeated as well, allowing the Mughals to re-occupy Delhi.

== Legacy and reforms ==
=== Currency ===
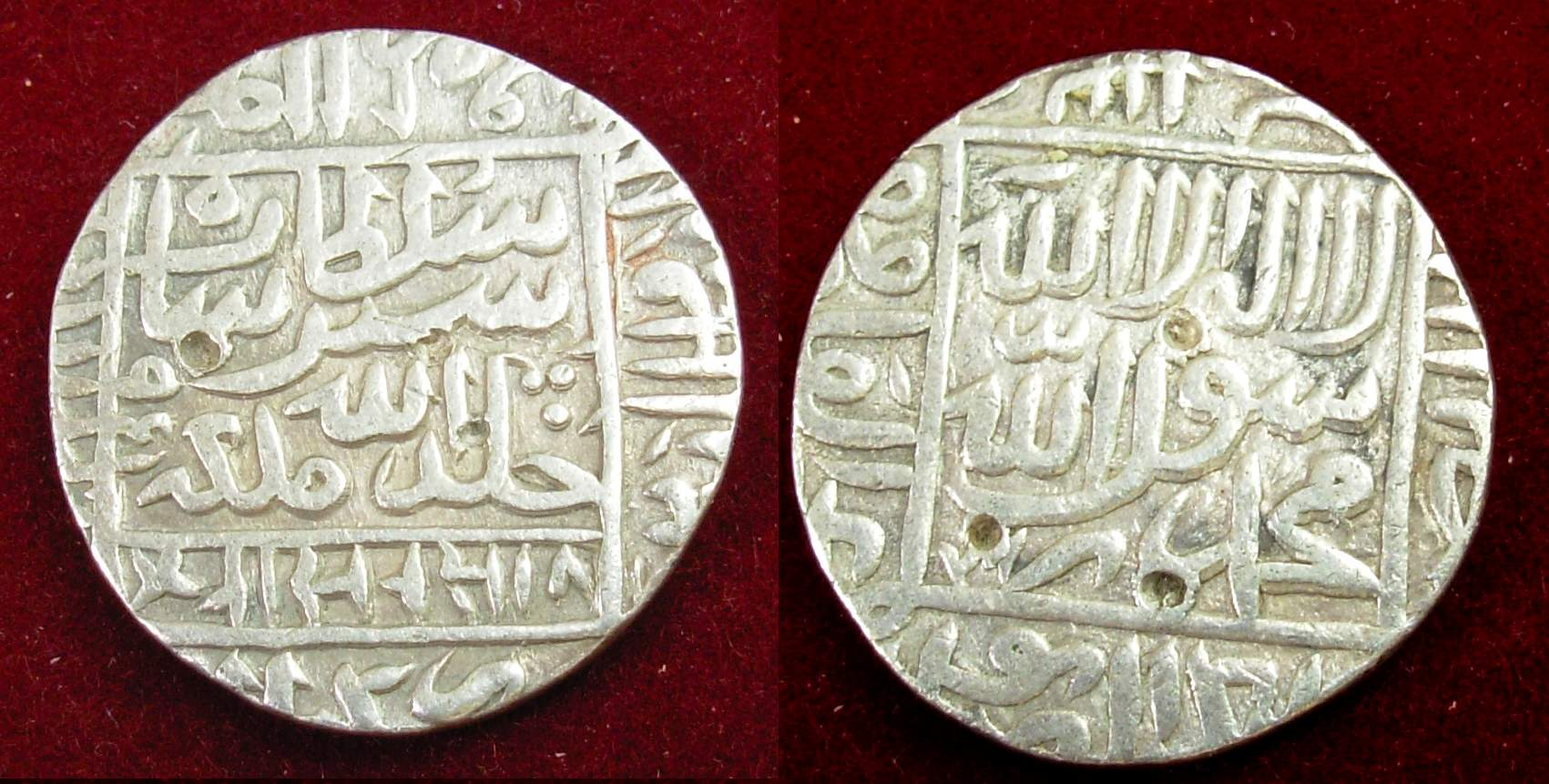
Rupiya released by Sher Shah Suri, 1538–1545 CE, was the first Rupee

The system of tri-metalism that came to characterize Mughal coinage was introduced by Sher Shah. While the term rūpya had previously been used as a generic term for any silver coin, during his rule the term rūpee came to be used as the name for a silver coin of a standard weight of 178 grains, which was the precursor of the modern rupee. The Rupee is today used as the national currency in India, Indonesia, the Maldives, Mauritius, Nepal, Pakistan, the Seychelles, and Sri Lanka. Gold coins called the Mohur weighing 169 grains and copper coins called Paisa were also minted during his reign. According to numismatists Goron and Goenka, it is clear from coins dated AH 945 (1538 AD) that Sher Shah had assumed the royal title of Farid al-Din Sher Shah and had coins struck in his own name prior to the battle of Chausa.

=== Provincial and local administration ===
Historians widely acclaim Sher Shah for his administrative ability, being referred to as one of the greatest Administrators in India. Some of his reforms took off the institutions of Alauddin Khalji. The Sur Empire was divided into many subdivisions called Iqtas, which were often ruled by military governors. Haibat Khan, who governed the Punjab, commanded over 30,000 men and could distribute jagirs to his soldiers. Khawas Khan, another military governor, ruled over Rajasthan with a force of over 20,000 men. The heads of Iqtas were known by various titles such as Hakim, Faujdar, or Momin and typically commanded bodies of men usually numbering less than 5,000. Their responsibilities included maintaining order and enforcing law within their jurisdictions.

Iqtas were further divided into districts known as Sarkars, each overseen by two chief officers: the Shiqar and the Munsif. The Shiqar was responsible for civil administration and could field 200–300 soldiers to maintain law and order. The Munsif handled revenue collection and civil justice, while chief Shiqars often dealt with criminal justice cases.

Sarkars were in turn divided into smaller units called Parganas, which consisted of a town and its surrounding villages. Each Pargana had a Shiqar, a Munsif, a Fotdar (treasurer), and a Karkun (clerk) proficient in Hindi and Persian. The Shiqar of a Pargana was a military officer under the Sarkar's Shiqar's oversight and was responsible for maintaining stability and assisting the Munsif in land revenue collection and measurement. The Munsif in the Pargana was under the supervision of the chief Munsif in the Sarkar.

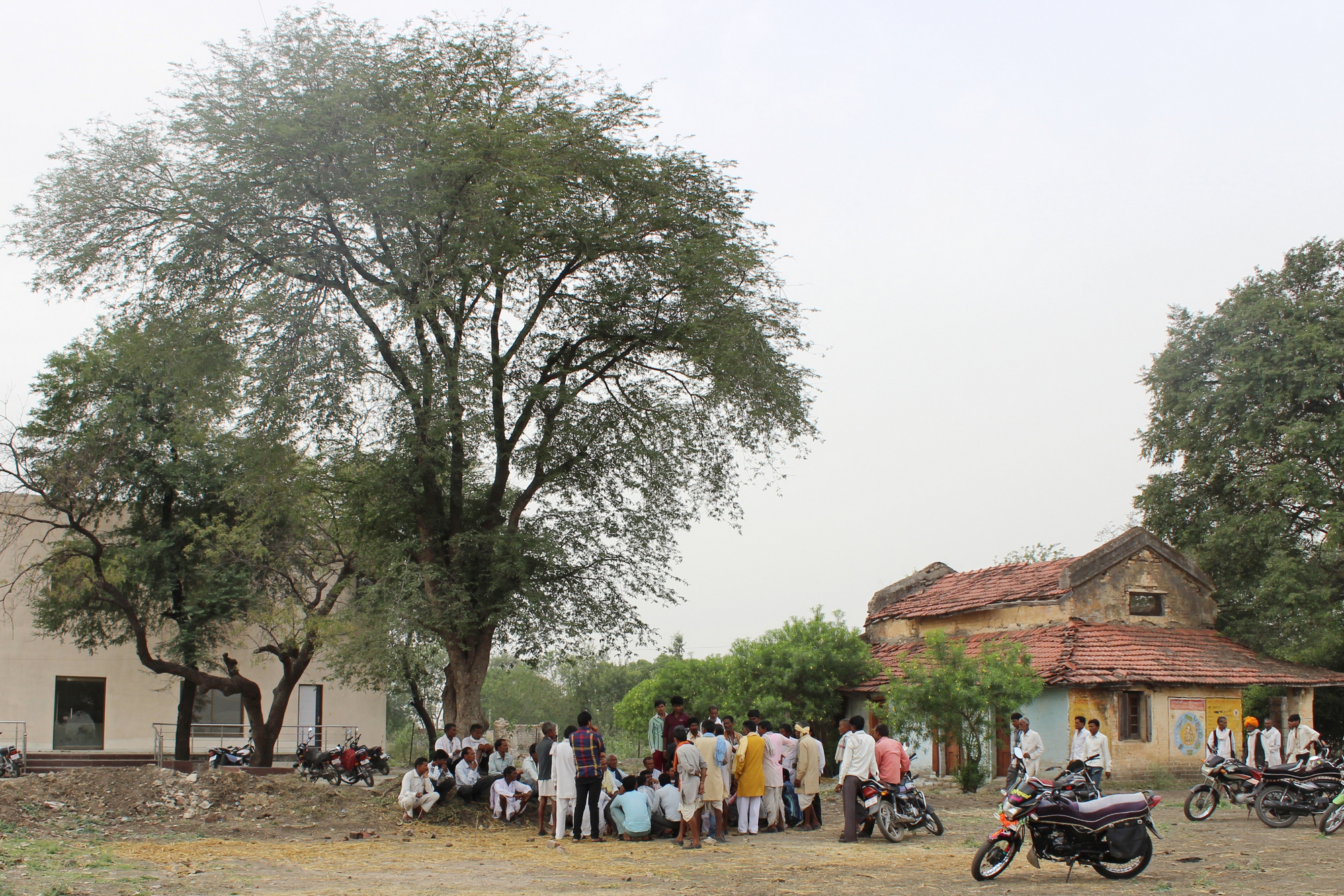
An open Panchayat in Narsingarh, Madhya Pradesh

Villages within the Parganas often operated autonomously and were governed by assemblies called Panchayats. This was respected by Sher Shah during his reign. These assemblies consisted of village elders who managed local needs and enforced community-specific punishments. The village chief acted as a liaison between the village and the higher levels of government.

=== Religious policy ===
The religious policy of Sher Shah is debated amongst historians. Dr. Qanungo states that Sher Shah upheld religious tolerance toward Hindus. Ram Sharma states that Sher Shah Suri was heavily devoted to his faith, always praying the five prayers, while also claiming that Sher Shah's wars against the Rajputs were a Jihad. The war against Puran Mal in particular was described as a Jihad, and his treatment of Maldeo were argued as signs of religious intolerance. Historians argue against this, however, with Sher Shah showing tolerance of Hindus throughout his reign. He did not bear grudges against Hindus or wage propaganda against them.

Srivastava elaborates, stating that Sher Shah's balanced approach satisfied his fellow Muslims despite his lenient treatment of Hindus. His policy was that Islam would hold supremacy over the lands he conquered, but without displacing Hinduism.

=== Military ===
Noted by historians as an excellent military leader, Sher Shah invited Afghans from across the empire as well as Afghanistan, giving them high positions and personally taking an interest in recruiting troops. Sher Shah promoted individuals based on merit rather than nepotism. The Afghan army emphasized cavalry, while their infantry were armed with muskets. One of his military reforms included dividing his army into divisions, each led by a commander. Discipline was strict, with provisions supplied by Banjaras who accompanied the army. Roles were assigned through the Dagh system, which also helped root out foreign spies. Salaries for soldiers were established at a fixed rate, and salaries were often regular.

During Sher Shah's first Bengal campaign from 1536 to 1537, his army was reportedly 240,000 strong, comprising 40,000 horsemen, 200,000 Infantry, 1,500 elephants, and 300 boats. In his second invasion from 1537 to 1538, his forces were said to include 100,000 horsemen and 300,000 footmen. These figures are likely exaggerated. A distressed Mughal commander in 1535 reported that Sher Shah only had 6,000 horsemen, while merely a few years later, he had over 70,000. These figures are put into question by Dirk H. A. Kolff, but he emphasizes the capabilities of Sher Shah in his methods of recruitment.

Chaurasia describe Sher Shah's commanding abilities through his patience, and foresight, being able to attack at a critical moment. Experienced with numerous military tactics, he often capitalized off of taking enemy forces by surprise. Sher Shah considered Pashto as a sign of friendliness, and gave higher salaries to Afghans who could speak Pashto in his army. By 1540, his standing army consisted of over 150,000 cavalrymen, 25,000 infantrymen, and over 5,000 war elephants.

=== Social justice ===
Sher Shah was renowned for his social justice. Courts were held by Qadis, with Sher Shah himself observing civil cases. Hindus settled their disputes in Panchayat assemblies, while in criminal cases, nobody was exempt from the law of the empire. The criminal law of the empire was extremely harsh to deter others from committing crimes out of fear of the repercussions. Sher Shah imposed heavy punishments on individuals in high posts, including government officials.

Sher Shah's reputation grew as he became known for being a formidable and just ruler, to the point where merchants could travel and sleep in deserts without fear of being harassed by bandits or robbers. His soldiers acted as police, with the duty of finding thieves and robbers. Sher Shah Suri also implemented the reform of self-responsibility, assigning officials the duty to find culprits in cases such as murder; if they failed, they would be held responsible and hanged. Historians praise these reforms for their effectiveness.

=== Buildings ===
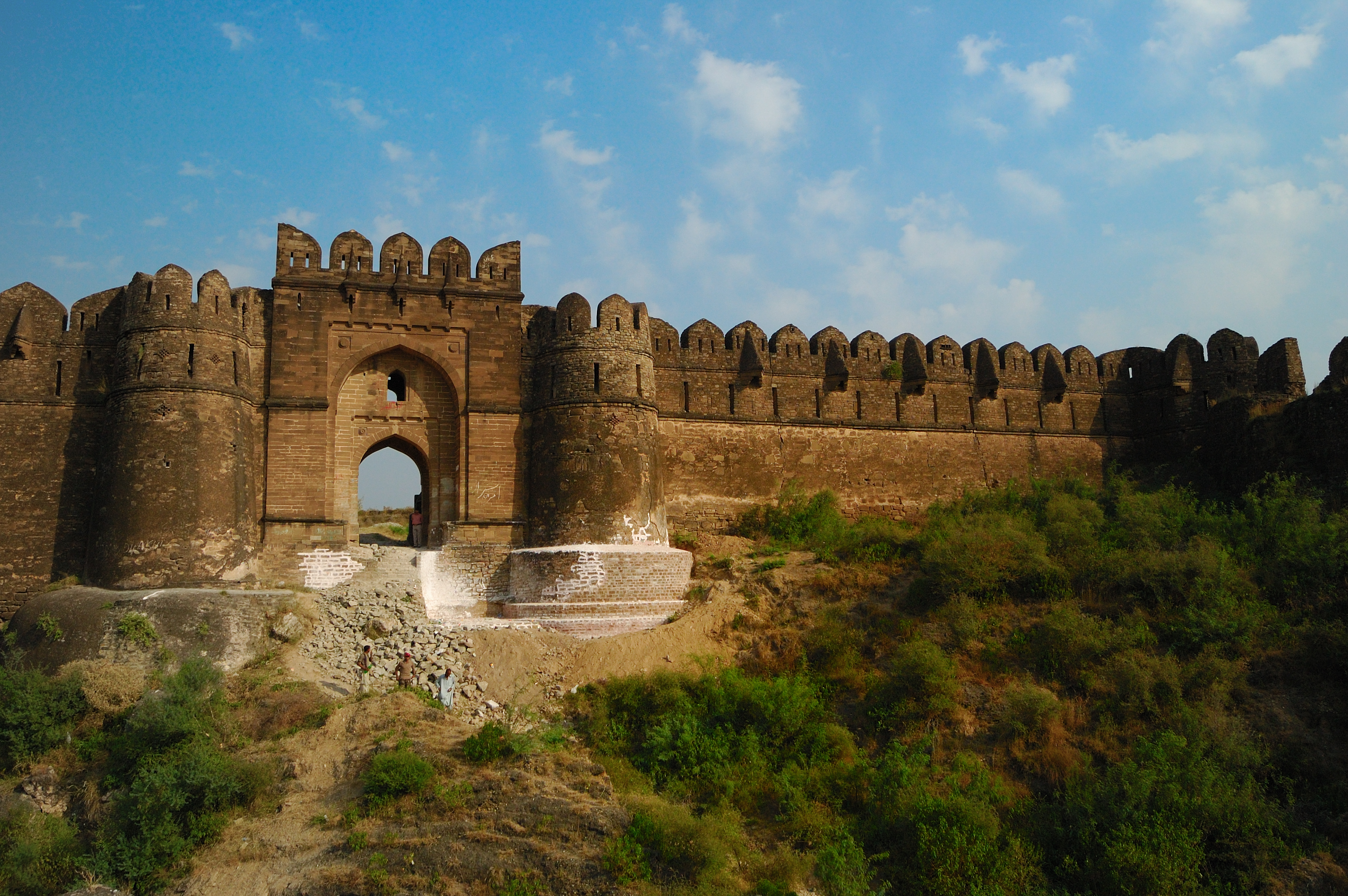
The Kabuli gate of Rohtas fort

Sher Shah built several monuments, including Rohtas Fort (now a UNESCO World Heritage Site in Pakistan), many structures in the Rohtasgarh Fort in Bihar, the Sher Shah Suri Masjid in Patna, the Qila-i-Kuhna Mosque inside the Purana Qila complex in Delhi, and the Sher Mandal, an octagonal building also inside the Purana Qila complex, which later served as the library of Humayun. He built a new city, Bhera, in present-day Pakistan in 1545, including within it a grand masjid named after him.

Sher Shah was responsible for greatly rebuilding and modernizing the Grand Trunk Road, a major artery that runs all the way from modern-day Bangladesh to Afghanistan. Caravanserais (inns) and mosques were built, and trees were planted along the entire stretch on both sides of the road to provide shade to travelers. Wells were also dug, especially along the western section. He also established an efficient postal system, with mail being carried by relays of horse riders.

The mausoleum of Sher Shah Suri was described as one of the most beautiful monuments in India due to its grandeur and dignity. British archaeologist Cunningham was even inclined to prefer it over the Taj Mahal.

=== Trade ===
Among his reforms while consolidating the empire, Sher Shah abolished taxes at the borders of provinces to invigorate trade throughout India. Only two levies remained in place: one on goods brought into the country and another when goods were sold. As a result, customs duties were entirely removed.

== In popular culture ==
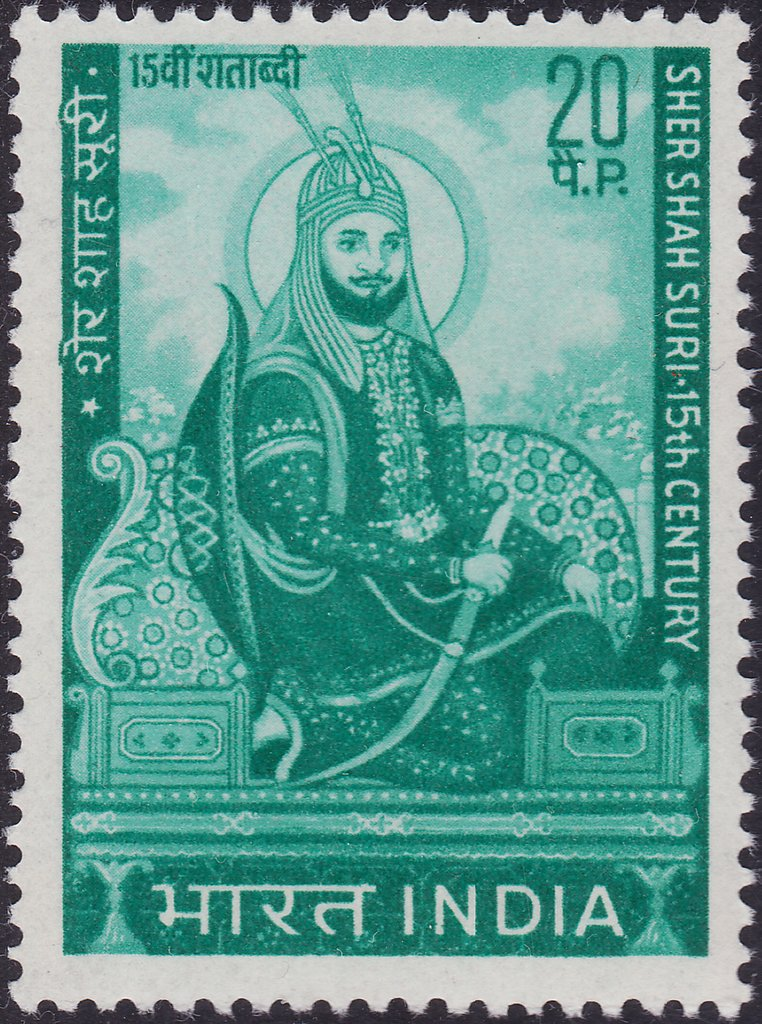
Sher Shah Suri on Indian Postage Stamp 1970

Sher Khan (1962), an Indian Hindi-language action film by Radhakant starring Kamaljeet in the titular role along with Kumkum, is ostensibly based on the emperor's life. Shershah Suri, a television show about the emperor, was aired on DD National by Doordarshan, the Indian national public broadcaster.

The Jungle Book, written by Rudyard Kipling, has its antagonist Shere Khan named after Sher Shah Suri.

== See also ==
- Isa Khan Niazi
- Khalji dynasty
- List of rulers of Bengal
- Jahangir Kabir (politician)
- History of Bangladesh
- History of India
- Shershabadia

Sher Shah Suri House of Sur Born: c. 1472/1486 Died: 1545
Regnal titles
New title Sur Empire established	Sultan of Hindustan; 1538/1540-1545	Succeeded by Islam Shah Suri
