= Siege of Raisen (1542–1543) =

Suri siege in 1542–1543

Date	July 1542 – January 1543
Location	Raisen
Result	Sur victory

Belligerents
Sur Empire	Purbiya Rajputs of Chanderi

Commanders and leaders
Sher Shah Suri	Puran Mal (executed)

Strength
Unknown	Unknown

Casualties and losses
Unknown	10,000 Abd al-Qadir Badayuni's claim

The siege of Raisen was a six-month siege led by Sher Shah Suri of the Sur Empire in 1543 against the Rajput leader, Raja Puran Mal of Chanderi. At the end of the siege, Puran Mal surrendered to Sher Shah and was executed thereafter.

In 1542, Sher Shah had conquered Malwa and proceeded towards Chanderi to annex the region. Mal had rebelled because Sher Shah had transferred him to Benares as part of his administration policy. Shortly after, Sher Shah besieged the fort, and Mal surrendered in January 1543 and was later executed by Sher Shah.

The ensuing siege lasted several months, but in the end heavy Afghan bombardment forced Mal to seek accommodation, and on Sher Shah giving his solemn assurance that he "shall suffer no injury in property or person", Mal came out of Raisen with his family and retinue.

Sher Shah and his army withdrew as agreed. However, along the way, he encountered widows of the chiefs of Chanderi and many others who demanded justice for the tyrannies they had suffered under the rule of Puran Mal, including enslavement of Muslim women. Sher Shah's army also heard this and demanded he take action. As a result, Sher Shah ordered Isa Khan Hajjab to lead a forced march that caught up with the retreating detachment of Puran Mal. As Abbas Sarwani describes the scene, when the Afghans surrounded his camp, Puran Mal went "into the tent of his beloved wife, Ratnavali, who sang Hindi melodies very sweetly, cut off her head," and ordered his captains also to slay their women and children. "While the Hindus were employed in putting their women and families to death, the Afghans on all sides commenced the slaughter of the Hindus. Puran Mal and his companions... failed not to exhibit valour and gallantry, but in the twinkling of an eye all were slain." Only a few women and children among the Rajputs survived. A daughter of Puran Mal who fell to the Afghans was given to minstrels to be brought up as a dancing girl; three of his young nephews were castrated.
