= Lohtamia =

Rajput clan of Bihar, India

Lohtamia is a Rajput clan of Eastern U.P ( Purvanchal ) and Shahabad region of Bihar ( now scattered in small numbers across Magadh and Mithila. There is a particular description given by almost every Historian about this clan " They are a sturdy independent race generally of fine physique, and addicted to frays and feuds of a serious character. Not many years ago the clan had the reputation of being closely associated with certain gangs of dacoits and robbers; they mevertheless furnish the army with some excellent soldiers ". They are old Suryavanshi Kshatriya and descendants of Lav ( Son of Ram ). They migrated from Lahore and established their kingdom Lohgadh and in 11th century. They settled around gangetic area in Bihar and U.P. It is said that they were such a courageous Rajput community who never made any matrimonial alliances with the Mughals in order to save their daughters from the eyes of Muslim invaders, they went and settled on the banks of Ganga in Bihar.

Lohtamia had moved from Lahore (Lohkot). Their dynasty ruled over Lohgadh (somewhere in the west), the Lohgadh fort was originally built by Lohtambh Rajputs .

Some Raghuvansi Kshatriya moved from Lohgadh state (somewhere in the west) and lived in Arrah, Balia & Ghazipur District . Due to the migration from Lohgadh they got the name Lohthambh and later to Lohtamiya Rajput. At Present day they are having around 40-45 villages in Arrah and Balia District. The commander of Shershah Suri, Sri Pahad Singh Ji was a Lohtamia Rajput. Lohthamia Rajputs fought alongside Babu Veer Kunwar Singh in first battle of 1857 Independence War in India against the Dumraon Estate and Britishers.Lohtamia Rajput Sri Vishwanath Singh Ji supported to Subhash Chandra Bose with his friend from Rajput Regiment in Rangoon War. As a Sainik of Azad Hind Fauz, Sri Viswanath Singh Ji was hanged till death by the British Company.

== History ==
Lohtamia Rajputs became an important ruling family in Mithila in the 18th century.

They captured Rajnagar and occupied multiple villages in the area with all Lohtamias claiming descent from a common ancestor. During the 17th century, they occupied a fort known as Rajnagar garh, the remains of which are still visible today establishing their own small regional militancy. Elders from the community state that they engaged in territorial disputes with other Rajput lineages including the Rajas of Dumraon.

Rajnagar developed into a minor chiefdom that was heavily militarised and the Lohtamia zamindars dominated life in the region however by the British-era, many Lohtamias lost their dominance due to continuous disputes with other Rajput clans and neighbouring castes.

== See also ==
- Babu Saheb
- Purbiya
- Babuaan
- Lohgadh
- Badgujar
