= Noohani dynasty =

Dynasty of Bihar

The Noohani dynasty was an Afghan Pashtun dynasty in Bihar, India. It originated from Sikandar Lodhi's period of political shifts. As Sikandar Lodhi gained power, the Jaunpur governor fled to Bihar. Tirhut and Saran's zamindars opposed central rule. All this led Lodhi to invade Bihar. Sikandar Lodi defeated Shah Shargi and appointed Dariya Khan Noohani as Bihar's administrator, who remained Bihar administrator until his death in 1523. After his father's death, his son Bahar Khan Noohani became an administrator. In 1523, Bahar Khan Noohani succeeded the throne. He declared independence and took Sultan Mohammad's title. Ibrahim Lodhi invaded his later. Initially, the Delhi army won but later British travelers John Marshall and Bernier visited Patna, Bhagalpur, Munger, Hajipur, discussing their prosperity.

The Mughals' fight to annex Bihar begins with Ghaghar's battle between Babur and Sultan Mohammad in 1527 AD. The Noohani dynasty ended in 1532 AD when Mughal Emperor Humayun defeated Afghans in Doha Sarah. He assaulted Chunar Fort in Al 1531. After the creation of Pakistan some Noohani families also migrated to Pakistan and settled in various areas of Sindh province, also migrated to Iran.
