= Motaher Hossain Sazu =

Former Deputy attorney general of Bangladesh

Motaher Hossain Sazu is a lawyer and former deputy attorney general of Bangladesh. In June 2024, Sazu represented petitioners seeking to restore a 30% quota in the Bangladesh Civil Service for children and grandchildren of Bangladesh Liberation War veterans, winning a verdict that led to the 2024 quota reform movement and the fall of the Sheikh Hasina led Awami League government. Following the government’s collapse, he was sued for the alleged murder of a student protester, along with several high-profile figures. The High Court granted him anticipatory bail, citing his senior status and absence from the incident site.

== Career ==
In November 2011, Sazu and SM Rezaul Karim led a group of pro-Awami League lawyers into the office of the President of the Bangladesh Supreme Court Bar Association Khandker Mahbub Hossain and remove photos of former President Ziaur Rahman, politician Maulana Abdul Hamid Khan Bhashani, and former chief of Bangladesh Army MAG Osmani from the office. Another group of pro-Awami League leaders led by Attorney General Mahbubey Alam, Abdul Matin Khasru, and Yusuf Hossain Humayun requested President Khandker Mahbub Hossain not hang the three portraits next to that of former President Sheikh Mujibur Rahman. The association was then dominated by lawyers aligned with the opposition Bangladesh Nationalist Party.

Sazu filed an appeal against the High Court Division verdict in 2016 that scrapped the 16th amendment to the constitution of Bangladesh, which was passed by the parliament on 22 September 2014, and gave it the power to remove judges due to incapability or misconduct. He defended executive magistrates on behalf of the state in the High Court Division. Sazu received the investigation report from the chief metropolitan magistrate of Dhaka in 2017 on Shyamal Kanti Bhakta, the Hindu principal of the Piyar Sattar Latif High School. Bhakta was allegedly humiliated by member of parliament AKM Salim Osman for allegedly insulting Islam.

Sazu represented the state in a case filed by a Bangladesh seeking to marry a Rohingya woman; Bangladeshi law does not allow its citizens to marry Rohingya refugees in Bangladesh. He represented the state in a hearing over the cancelled candidacy of Afroza Khan Rita the Bangladesh Nationalist Party candidate for Manikganj-3 due to defaulting on an 18 billion Bangladeshi Taka loan from Sonali Bank ahead of the 2018 general election. He represented the Bangladesh Election Commission in a hearing on an appeal filed by former Prime Minister Khaleda Zia against the cancellation of her candidacy by the Election Commission due to her conviction in a criminal case. The High Court bench upheld the decision of the commission. He represented the state in an apeal filed by Jalal Uddin, candidate of the Bikolpo Dhara Bangladesh, challenging the Election Commission canceling the candidacy of the Bangladesh Nationalist Party candidate Khandker Abu Ashfaq for Dhaka-1 on the grounds of him holding the office of Nawabganj Upazila chairman.

Sazu was the organizing secretary of the Peshajibi Samannay Parishad in 2020. He represented sub-inspector of Kotwali Police Station Mahmudul Hasan, nephew of Mizanur Rahman, in a case filed by the Anti-Corruption Commission. He represented Anwar Hossain Choudhury, faculty member of Chittagong University, in a sedition case filed by Asaduzzaman Tanvir, the former convener of Fatikchhari Upazila unit of the Bangladesh Chhatra League. The case was filed following an article on Bhorer Kagoj based on a journal article on the history of Bangladesh Liberation War, Awami League and Sheikh Mujibur Rahman by Chowdhury. In September 2023, he signed an open letter criticizing a letter by world leaders in support of Muhammad Yunus, founder of Grameen Bank, and described it as a threat to the sovereignty of Bangladesh. He also protested a resolution of the European Union parliament on the human rights situation in Bangladesh.

Sazu represented petitioners in June 2024 who asked the High Court Division to restore 30 percent quota in the Bangladesh Civil Service for children and grandchildren of veterans of Bangladesh Liberation War. He secured a verdict in favor of the petitioners which restored the 30 percent quota and led to the 2024 Bangladesh quota reform movement and collapse of the Awami League government.

Following the fall of the Sheikh Hasina led Awami League government, Sazu was sued for murder of a student protestor against Hasina at Jatrabari Police Station. Also accused in the case, aside from him, are former prosecutors of the International Crimes Tribunal Muklesur Rahman Badal, and Syed Haider Ali; Iqbal Sobhan Chowdhury, Shahriyar Kabir, Mozammel Haque Babu, senior journalist Monjurul Ahsan Bulbul, Sheikh Hasina, Shafique Ahmed, AM Amin Uddin, lawyer Tania Amir, and 293 others over the death of student Imran Hossain on August 5. Justices Mahmudul Hoque and Shahed Nuruddin granted him anticipatory bail in the case considering his status as a senior lawyer of the Bangladesh Supreme Court and that he was not present at the site of the death.
