= Syed Haider Ali (lawyer) =

Syed Haider Ali is a Bangladeshi lawyer and former prosecutor of the International Crimes Tribunal with the rank and status of the Attorney General of Bangladesh.

== Career ==
In May 2007, Ali was the defender of Mohiuddin Khan Alamgir, an Awami League politician, along with Syed Rezaur Rahman and Shahara Khatun.

Ali resigned as deputy attorney general of Bangladesh in June 2008.

Ali was appointed a prosecutor of the International Crimes Tribunal with the rank and status of an additional Attorney General of Bangladesh in March 2010. He represented the state in the trial of politicians Delawar Hossain Sayedee, Abdul Alim, and Abul Kalam Azad. He was the persecutor for Motiur Rahman Nizami. He argued for accepting newspaper reports as evidence in the tribunal.

In March 2013, the government of Bangladesh upgraded Ali's rank to that of the Attorney General of Bangladesh. After Chief Prosecutor Ghulam Arief Tipoo went on leave, Ali was appointed acting chief prosecutor. He continued to hold the position after Tipoo returned which led to a public spat between the two with allegations of professional misconduct directed at each other. In September 2015, the International Crimes Tribunal sought an explanation from him for skipping a hearing. He was the persecutor in war crimes trial of four accused from Maulvibazar District, Akmal Ali Talukder, Abdun Nur Talukder alias Lal Miah, Anis Miah, and Abdul Musabbir Miah and secured death penalty for them in 2018. He was the prosecutor in the war crimes case against six men from six Gaibandha District.

Following the fall of the Sheikh Hasina led Awami League government, Ali resigned as the acting chief prosecutor International Crimes Tribunal and was replaced by Mohammad Tajul Islam. He was sued for the murder of a student protester against Hasina at the Jatrabari Police Station. Also accused in the case, aside from Ali, are former deputy attorney general Motaher Hossain Sazu, prosecutor of the International Crimes Tribunal Muklesur Rahman Badal, Iqbal Sobhan Chowdhury, Shahriyar Kabir, Mozammel Haque Babu, senior journalist Monjurul Ahsan Bulbul, Sheikh Hasina,, Shafique Ahmed, AM Amin Uddin, lawyer Tania Amir, and 293 others over the death of student Imran Hossain on August 5.
