= Dhaka Bar Association =

Bar association of lawyers in Dhaka

- Formation: 1889
- Headquarters: Dhaka, Bangladesh
- Region served: Bangladesh
- Official language: Bengali
- Website: dhakabarassociation.com

Dhaka Bar Association is the bar association of lawyers in Dhaka, the capital of Bangladesh. The association has 34,639 members and 57,000 on the wait list.

== History ==
Dhaka Bar Association was established in 1889. During the 1952 Bengali Language movement, the All Party State Language Committee of Action had their meeting at the association office on 27 April 1952.

The two panels competing in elections at the association are Sammilito Ainjibi Samonnay Parishad, backed by the Awami League, and the Bangladesh Jatiotabadi Ainjibi Oikkya Panel, backed by the Bangladesh Nationalist Party.

In 2003, members of the Dhaka Bar Association declared Moudud Ahmed, Minister of Law, unwanted at the association. The association leaders visited former prime minister Sheikh Hasina after the 2004 Dhaka grenade attack at a rally of her.

President Khandaker Mahbub Hossain was called to control agitating Bangladesh Nationalist Party affiliated lawyers in 2010 who alleged former Khaleda Zia would not get a fair trial at the High Court Division. The association chose not to provide legal assistance to Sohel Rana, owner of the collapsed Rana Plaza.

The Awami League-backed panel swept the 2016 bar election. Khorshed Alam, president of the association, represented former prime minister Khaleda Zia, in 2017 in a corruption case. After Khaleda Zia left the courtroom, Alam and her other lawyers started fighting while trying to take center stage in front of the press. Former president of the association TM Akbar died while cross-examining a witness at the trial of Khaleda Zia. Golam Mostafa Khan, President of the Association, supported former Prime Minister Khaleda Zia. At the court, he said, “I came here as president of Dhaka Bar Association. None of madam's [Khaleda] lawyers is present in the court. There was a huge communication gap. We learnt about the shifting of the court from TV scrolls".

During the COVID-19 pandemic in Bangladesh, the association demanded that the Directorate General of Health Services designate six hospitals for treating lawyers and their family members exclusively. It provided 122.9 million Bangladesh Taka interest free loans to members during the pandemic. In January 2020, there was a brief fire at the association headquarters, which was quickly put out.

Lawyers backed by Bangladesh Nationalist Party and Bangladesh Jamaat-e-Islami won top posts in the 2020 bar election. The Sammilito Ainjibi Samonnay Parishad, backed by the Awami League, won the 2021, 2022 and 2023 Bar elections. The 2023 election was boycotted by lawyers affiliated with the Bangladesh Nationalist Party. Former president of the association Md Mohsin Miah sued nine police officers, including Additional Deputy Commissioner Muhit Kabir Sarneabat, for assaulting lawyers aligned with the Bangladesh Nationalist Party. The association was criticized for demolishing Neelam Ghar, a century old government auction house from the British Raj, to expand their office.

In March 2024, the Awami League backed White Panel won the 2024 bar election. After the fall of the Sheikh Hasina-led Awami League government, former general secretary of the association, Momtaz Uddin Ahmad Mehedi, was accused of murder in a case over the death of a protester against Sheikh Hasina, who had died in police firing. In November, the association was requested by the Chief Metropolitan Magistrate of Dhaka to investigate an attack on Swapan Krishna Roy Chowdhury, the lawyer of Awami League Member of Parliament Amir Hossain Amu inside the Dhaka Court by lawyers affiliated with the Bangladesh Nationalist Party.

On 6 April 2025, a Dhaka court rejected the bail pleas of 84 pro-Awami League lawyers and sent them to jail in connection with a case involving violence, vandalism, and attempted murder during a protest on 4 August 2024. The court granted bail to nine others, including Abu Sayeed Sagar, former president of the Dhaka Bar Association. The case, filed by executive member Mohammad Ali Babu, accused 144 pro-AL lawyers of attacking the court premises with crude bombs and weapons, looting chambers of pro-BNP lawyers, and causing extensive property damage. The accused had previously secured temporary bail from the High Court, which was set to expire on 7 April. On 29 June 2025, the Dhaka Bar Association filed three separate cases against 11 former executive committee members, all reportedly affiliated with the Awami League, alleging embezzlement of over Tk11 crore. The complaints, submitted to the court of Dhaka Metropolitan Magistrate Mehedi Hasan, cite criminal breach of trust and fraud across three consecutive committee terms (2022–2025). Accused individuals include past presidents, general secretaries, and treasurers of the association.

== Notable members ==
- Mahbubey Alam
- Khandaker Mahbub Hossain
