= A. J. Mohammad Ali =

Bangladeshi lawyer and politician (died 2024)

- এ. জে. মোহাম্মদ আলী

12th Attorney General for Bangladesh
- In office 30 April 2005 – 24 January 2007
- Appointed by: Iajuddin Ahmed
- President: Iajuddin Ahmed
- Preceded by: A. F. Hassan Ariff
- Succeeded by: Fida M. Kamal

Personal details
- Born: 15 December 1951 Naogaon, East Bengal, Dominion of Pakistan
- Died: 2 May 2024 (aged 72) Mount Elizabeth Hospital, Singapore
- Resting place: Banani graveyard
- Party: Bangladesh Nationalist Party
- Parent: M. H. Khandaker (father)
- Profession: Lawyer

Abdul Jamil Mohammad Ali (15 December 1951 – 2 May 2024) was a Bangladeshi lawyer who served as the 12th attorney general for Bangladesh from 2005 to 2007.

== Early life ==
Ali was born on 15 December 1951 in Naogaon in the then East Bengal, Dominion of Pakistan. His father MH Khandaker was the first attorney general of Bangladesh.

== Career ==
Ali was enrolled to practise in the High Court in 1980 and in the Appellate Division in 1985. He was appointed additional attorney general on 23 October 2001 and as the attorney general on 30 April 2005. He resigned from the position on 24 January 2007.

Ali served as the president of Bangladesh Supreme Court Bar Association and Bangladesh Bar Council's executive committee chairman. He served as the president of the Bangladesh Jatiyatabadi Ainjibi Forum.

Ali served as the lawyer of former prime minister Begum Khaleda Zia for the Zia Orphanage Trust corruption case. He was also the lawyer of Moudud Ahmed.

== Death ==
Ali died on 2 May 2024, at the age of 73, in Mount Elizabeth Hospital, Singapore. He had been suffering from prostate cancer.
