= Tasmima Hossain =

Bangladeshi politician

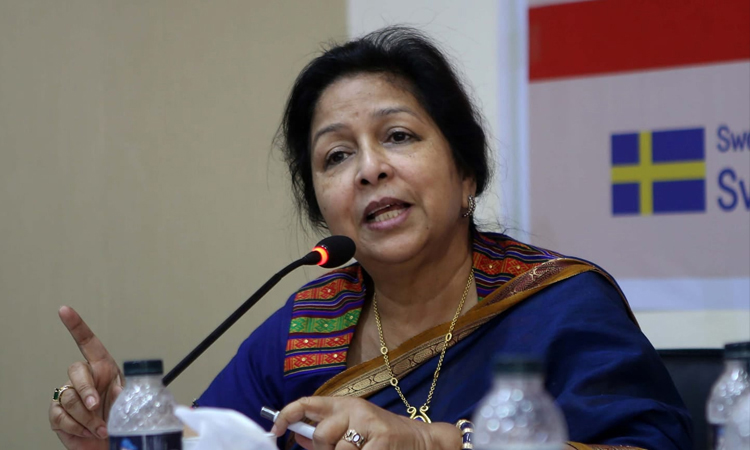
- Tasmima Hossain in 2022

Member of the Bangladesh Parliament for Pirojpur-2
- In office September 1996 – 13 July 2001
- Preceded by: Anwar Hossain Manju
- Succeeded by: Anwar Hossain Manju

Personal details
- Born: 12 January 1951 (age 75) Dhaka, East Bengal, Dominion of Pakistan
- Party: Jatiya Party (Manju)
- Spouse: Anwar Hossain Manju
- Relatives: Mainul Hosein (brother-in-law); Tofazzal Hossain Manik Miah (father-in-law)

Tasmima Hossain (Bengali: তাসমিমা হোসেন; born 1951) is a Jatiya Party politician Journalist. She was also served as a Member of Parliament representing the Pirojpur-2 constituency. Currently, She is the Editor of The Daily Ittefaq and Anannya.

== Early life ==
Hossain was born in 1951 to a Bengali family in Dacca, East Bengal, then part of the Dominion of Pakistan. She is originally from Gendaria.

== Career ==
Hossain was elected to parliament in 1996 from Pirojpur-2 as a Jatiya Party candidate. In 1988, she was made the editor of Anannya magazine. She was a founding member of Breaking the Silence, a non profit, and its chairperson for a number of years. In 2014, she became the deputy editor of The Daily Ittefaq. On 4 July 2018, she was made the editor of The Daily Ittefaq.

== Personal life ==
Hossain is married to Anwar Hossain Manju, the publisher of The Daily Ittefaq, and son of Tofazzal Hossain Manik Miah, the founding editor of The Daily Ittefaq. Hossain's youngest daughter, Anushay Hossain, is a journalist and former political analyst based in the United States, who in her nonfiction book The Pain Gap, wrote about the influence of her mother during her childhood.
