= Anwar Hossain Manju =

Bangladeshi politician (born 1944)

- আনোয়ার হোসেন মঞ্জু
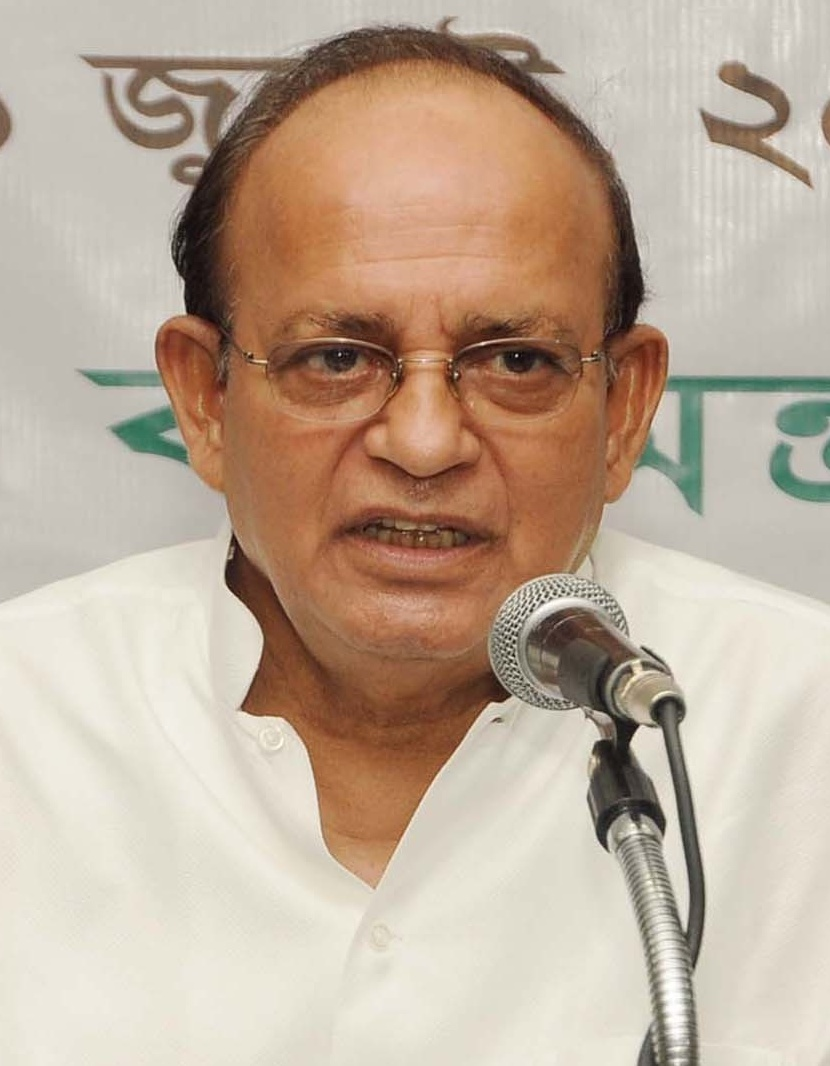
- Manju in 2015

Member of Bangladesh Parliament
- In office 29 January 2014 – 30 January 2024
- Preceded by: Shah Alam
- Succeeded by: Mohiuddin Maharaj
- In office 28 October 2001 – 27 October 2006
- Preceded by: Tasmima Hossain
- In office 15 April 1988 – 24 November 1995
- Preceded by: Monirul Islam Monir
- Succeeded by: Nurul Islam Manzur
- Constituency: Pirojpur-2
- In office 14 July 1996 – 13 July 2001
- Preceded by: Shahjahan Omar
- Succeeded by: Shahjahan Omar
- Constituency: Jhalokati-1

Minister of Water Resources
- In office 3 January 2018 – 7 January 2019
- Prime Minister: Sheikh Hasina
- Preceded by: Anisul Islam Mahmud
- Succeeded by: Vacant

Minister of Environment and Forest
- In office 12 January 2014 – 3 January 2018
- Succeeded by: Anisul Islam Mahmud

Minister of Road Transport and Bridges
- In office 23 June 1996 – 15 July 2001
- Prime Minister: Sheikh Hasina
- Preceded by: Abdul Matin Chowdhury
- Succeeded by: Nazmul Huda
- In office 27 March 1988 – 6 December 1990
- President: Hussain Muhammad Ershad
- Preceded by: M. Motiur Rahman
- Succeeded by: Oli Ahmad

Minister of Energy and Mineral Resource
- In office 1985–1988
- President: Hussain Muhammad Ershad

Personal details
- Born: 9 February 1944 (age 82) Pirojpur District, Bengal Presidency, British India
- Party: Jatiya Party (Manju)
- Spouse: Tasmima Hossain
- Children: Tareen Hossain (daughter)
- Parent: Tofazzal Hossain Manik Miah (father)
- Relatives: Mainul Hosein (brother); Khandaker Mahbub Hossain (uncle); Mujibur Rahman Chowdhury (son-in-law)
- Education: Georgetown University; University of Dhaka

Anwar Hossain Manju (born 9 February 1944) is a Bangladeshi politician and former journalist who is a former Jatiya Sangsad member representing Pirojpur-2 constituency which consists of Kawkhali, Bhandaria and Zianagar upazilas until January 2024. He was elected a member of Jatiya Sangsad a total of seven times. He is a former Minister of Water Resources, Minister of Communications as Communications Transport and Minister of Energy and Mineral Resource.

== Early life and education ==
Manju was born on 9 February 1944 to a Sunni Bengali family in the village of Bhandaria, then part of the Backergunge District of Bengal. He is the son of Tofazzal Hossain Manik Miah, founding editor of The Daily Ittefaq, and brother of politician Mainul Hosein. Manju's paternal grandfather, Moslehuddin Miah, was originally from Faridpur. His mother was the daughter of Khandaker Abul Hasan Faridpuri of Bamna. Manju's maternal ancestor, Khondkar Munshi Samiruddin, was the naib (deputy) of Taluqdar Hosenuddin Chowdhury, the second Zamindar of Bamna. His maternal uncles are lawyer Khandaker Mahbub Hossain and journalist Khandaker Shahadat Hossain.

Manju graduated in University of Dhaka, completing his honors in geography with physics and mathematics. He pursued further studies in international relations at Georgetown University in Washington, D.C..

== Career ==
Manju was the minister of energy and mineral resource of Bangladesh from 1985 to 1988 under Hossain Mohammad Ershad. As Energy Minister, his achievements include the augmentation of energy generation from 700 to 2,500 megawatts, and the launching of the major public works project of the Jamuna Bridge. Hossain then served as Minister of Communications (1988–1990) for Ershad's government.

Manju was a vocal opponent of Ershad's introduction of religious references to the Constitution of Bangladesh. He objected to the declaration of Islam as the state religion of Bangladesh and warned that such an assault on secularism constitutes a slippery slope that would erode Bangladesh's successes as a progressive society. From 1996 to 2001, he served as Minister of Communications (1996–2001) in Sheikh Hasina's government. Hossain negotiated Jatiya Party's extension of support to Sheikh Hasina's party, the Awami League, to form a national government. He is Chairman of Jatiya Party (JP-Manju). He led the faction of the Jatiya Party that rejected the 1994 decision of the Party leader Ershad to align the Party with Khaleda Zia's Bangladesh National Party (BNP). He was a Presidium Member of Jatiya Party (1986–1994).

Manju's public service also include positions in the legislative branch of government. He served as Member of Parliament in Bangladesh for five consecutive terms. He was elected five times to Parliament in 1986, 1988, 1991, 1996, and 2001 to represent the Bhandaria-Kaukhali constituency in the district of Pirojpur in the National Parliament. The mandate of the last Parliament expired in 2006, putting into place a caretaker government (CTG).

Manju served as the editor and publisher of The Daily Ittefaq from 1972 to 2007. The newspaper is the first Bangla vernacular newspaper founded by Maulana Abdul Hamid Khan Bhasani and Yar Mohammad Khan. Meanwhile, Tofazzal Hossain Manik Miah worked as an editor. Following an agreement with the other shareholders of Ittefaq, Manju assumed the position of editor and publisher in July 2010. Manju is also a businessman. His enterprise positions include founder, the Aegis Holdings Group. He is also chairman of the board, MAST Packaging Ltd. & Zenith Packaging Ltd., one of the most notable packaging firms in Bangladesh with an international clientele including the British-American Tobacco Company.

In a January 2018 cabinet reshuffle, he moved from the Ministry of Environment and Forest to become the Minister for Water Resources.

== Controversies ==
In April 2007, as part of the caretaker government's anti-graft crackdown, National Board of Revenue (NBR) directed all the banks to submit transaction data of 71 individuals including Manju, his wife and his four daughters. According to NBR, Manju bought a BMW using the parliamentarian membership privilege of importing duty-free cars.

On 24 March 2008, Manju and his wife were charged by Anti-Corruption Commission (ACC) for amassing wealth illegally and concealing information in their wealth statement. According to the complaint filed in October 2007, Manju owned property worth Tk 17.1 crore which was disproportionate to his income and he also had concealed information of wealth worth Tk 4.22 crore in the statement submitted to the ACC. Manju's wife was made an accused in the case for abetting her husband.

On 26 June 2007, Manju was sentenced to five years of imprisonment and fined Tk 10,000 for possessing 21 bottles of liquor at his Dhanmondi residence. Manju was sent to jail on surrender in a graft case.

In August 2010, the High Court cleared the 13-year-jail term sentenced by the lower court and in November 2015, the Supreme Court upheld the decision. A biographical detailed documentary film is made for Anwar Hossain Manju which is named as 'Iron Man' directed by Kamrul Hasan Nasim.

== Personal life ==
Manju is married to Tasmima Hossain and has 4 daughters - Seema Hossain, Tareen Hossain, Anushay Hossain, and Maneeza Hossain. Tareen Hossain is the managing director of The Daily Ittefaq and married to Mujibur Rahman Chowdhury, a relative of former Prime Minister Sheikh Hasina.

A documentary film, Iron Man, was produced in 2020 depicting the life stories of Manju.
