= Manik Mia Avenue =

Boulevard in Dhaka, Bangladesh

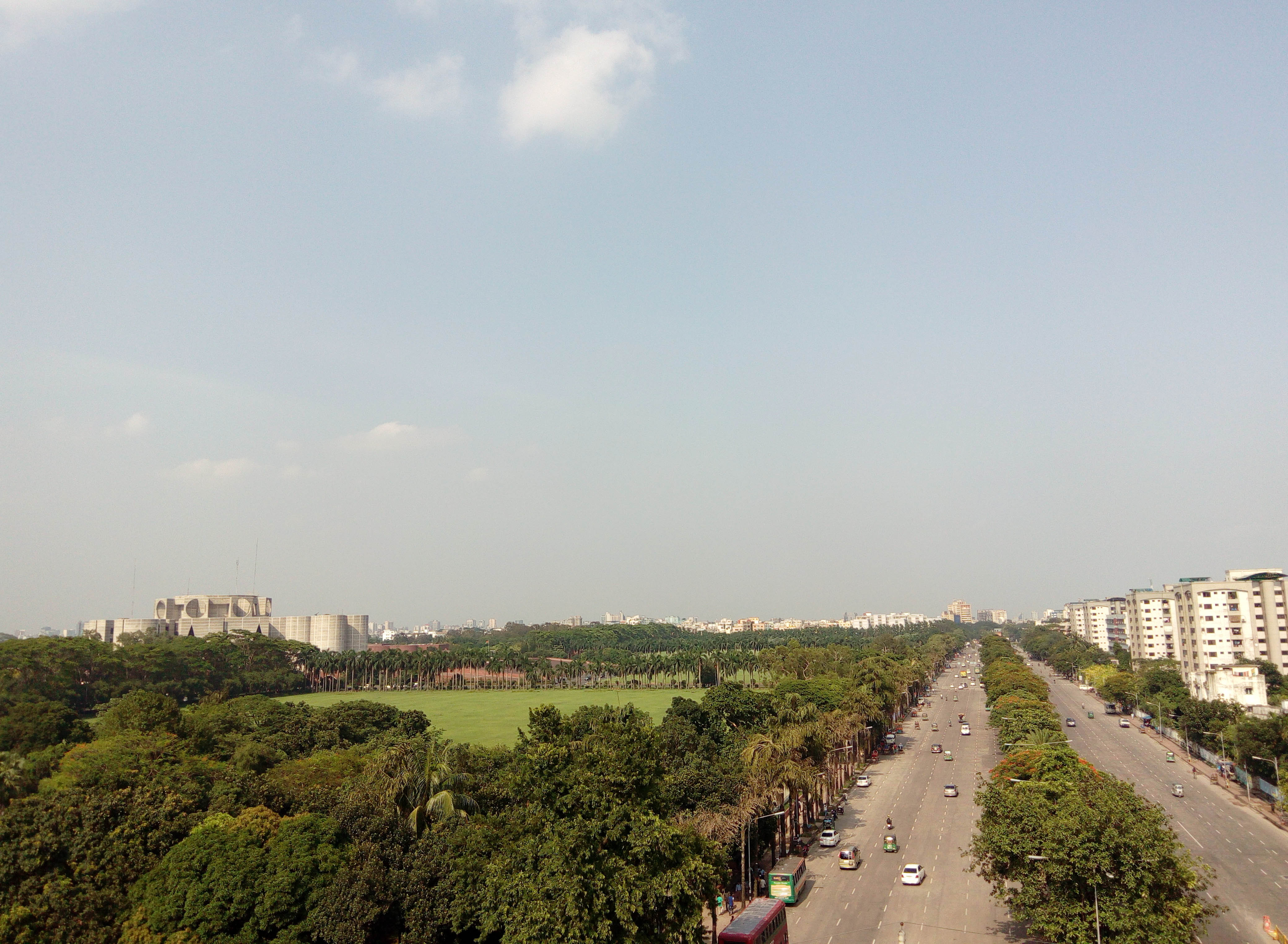
- Manik Mia Avenue
- Namesake: Manik Mia
- Type: Boulevard
- Maintained by: Dhaka North City Corporation
- Length: 0.95 km (0.59 mi)
- Location: Dhaka
- East end: Indira Road
- West end: Mirpur Road

Manik Mia Avenue is a major boulevard in Sher-e-Bangla Nagar, Dhaka, that forms the south boundary of the National Parliament House Complex and houses the official residences of many parliament members.

== Description ==
The avenue is a major street at Sher-e-Bangla Nagar in Dhaka. It starts from Bangabandhu Square, popularly known as Khamarbari roundabout at Farmgate, where it meets with Indira Road and Sangsad Avenue and ends at Lalmatia Aarong Intersection before Road 27 intersection of Dhanmondi, where it junctions with Mirpur Road and Road 27 of Dhanmondi R/A.

Before the then-governing Dhaka City Corporation put dividers on the avenue, political parties used to hold public meetings here because of its width.

It is named after Tofazzal Hossain Manik Miah, editor of The Daily Ittefaq.

== Landscape ==
- National Parliament House
- Bangladesh Jute Research Institute
- MP Hostels
