= Tofazzal Hossain Manik Miah =

Bengali politician and journalist (c.1911–1969)

- তফাজ্জল হোসেন মানিক মিয়া تفضل حسین مانک میاں
- Born: c. 1911; Bhandaria, Backergunge District, Eastern Bengal and Assam
- Died: 1 June 1969 (aged 57–58); Rawalpindi, Punjab, West Pakistan, Pakistan
- Burial place: Azimpur Graveyard, Dhaka, Bangladesh
- Other name: Musafir
- Occupation: Editor for The Daily Ittefaq
- Children: Mainul Hosein; Anwar Hossain Manju
- Relatives: Khandaker Mahbub Hossain
- Awards: Ekushey Padak

Tofazzal Hossain, popularly known as Manik Miah (c. 1911 – 1 June 1969), was a Pakistani Bengali journalist and politician. He served as the founding editor of The Daily Ittefaq. He wrote the editorial Rajnoitik Moncho ("The Political Stage"). Most of his newspaper's journalists were considered leftist, as Miah followed the pattern of Awami League. According to journalist and editor of Shongbad Bozlur Rahman, Awami activists followed his editorial more than any actual decision of a meeting. He was a close associate of Huseyn Shaheed Suhrawardy and a mentor to Sheikh Mujibur Rahman.

Miah wrote his political columns in Bengali. He was equally prolific in his English renderings. Miah, who was popularly known for his powerful political column in The Daily Ittefaq (founded by Abdul Hamid Khan Bhashani and Yar Mohammad Khan) under the pen-name 'Musafir', dedicated his entire life for the cause of emancipation of the people in the then East Pakistan (now Bangladesh) and establishing the democracy. Yar Mohammad Khan invited Miah, who was working at that time as a journalist, at Calcutta and made him the editor of The Daily Ittefaq.

== Early life ==
Hossain was born in 1911 to a Sunni Bengali family in the village of Bhandaria, then part of the Backergunge District in Eastern Bengal and Assam. His father, Moslehuddin Miah, was originally from Faridpur. Hossain attended Pirojpur High School upon passing his entrance examination and earned his Bachelor of Arts degree from Brojomohun College in Barisal.

== Career ==
Hossain started working under the sub-divisional officer of Pirojpur as an assistant. Subsequently, he became Barisal's district public relation officer. He resigned from government job and took up journalism as a profession on the advice of Huseyn Shaheed Suhrawardy. He moved to Kolkata in 1943 and started working in the office of the Bengal Muslim League as a secretary. He joined the Daily Ittehad as secretary to the board of directors in Kolkata, founded by Huseyn Shaheed Suhrawardy.

Hossain moved to Dhaka in 1948 and joined the weekly Ittefaq, published from Dhaka. In 1951, he became the editor of the weekly Ittefaq replacing Maulana Abdul Hamid Khan Bhashani. In 1952, he visited China to attend the Asia and Pacific Rim Peace Conference along with Sheikh Mujibur Rahman, Ataur Rahman Khan, Dr. Syed Yusuf Hasan, and Khandakar Mohammed Illias. Hossain converted the weekly Ittefaq into a daily in 1953. In 1959, he was detained for one year under martial law of President Ayub Khan. He was detained again in 1962.

Hossain served as the elected president of the Pakistan branch of International Press Institute in 1963, secretary of the government-sponsored Pakistan Press Court of Honours and director of Pakistan International Airlines (1956–58). On 16 June 1963, Hossain was detained again and the Daily Ittefaq banned. His press, New Nation Printing Press, was confiscated by the government of Pakistan. His two other newspapers, Dhaka Times and Purbani (Cine Weekly), were also forced close. After the 1963 Hazratbal Shrine theft of Prophet Muhammad's beard hair, in Kashmir, 1964 East Pakistan riots broke out. He helped in preventing the violence from spreading. He worked as the mouthpiece of the Combined Opposition Parties, which were the political parties of Pakistan working against General Ayub Khan and supporting the presidential candidacy of Fatima Jinnah, sister of the founder of Pakistan Mohammed Ali Jinnah.

Hossain played a notable role during the Six point movement of 1966. The movement—spearheaded by Awami League leadership after realizing that the East and West Pakistan were moving along divergent economic paths—tried to establish regional economic autonomy of East Pakistan. The announcement of the six-point movement was supposed to be made by Shah Azizur Rahman as per the decision of Mujib himself. However, Miah felt that it should be Mujib rather than Shah Azizur Rahman who should make the announcement. Mujib's declaration of the program in 1966 elevated his position as the undisputed supreme leader in what would become the movement for independence in 1971. He supported the six point movement, which bought him the pique of the government. Hossain was detained on 16 June 1966 and released on 27 March 1967.

Following the 1969 East Pakistan mass uprising, the ban on Ittefaq was lifted and it started operations again. The Daily Star described 1954 to 1971 as the "golden era" of The Daily Ittefaq under Hossain and uncompilable to any newspaper in Bangladesh. During the Bangladesh Liberation War, the office of Ittfaq was burned down by Pakistan Army on 25 March 1971 at the start of Operation Searchlight.

== Personal life ==
He was married to the daughter of Khandaker Abul Hasan Faridpuri of Bamna. Hossain's maternal great grandfather-in-law, Khondkar Munshi Samiruddin, was the naib (deputy) of Taluqdar Hosenuddin Chowdhury, the second Zamindar of Bamna. Hossain's brothers-in-law are lawyer Khandaker Mahbub Hossain and journalist Khandaker Shahadat Hossain.

Hossain's son, Anwar Hossain Manju, served as the editor of the Ittefaq and chairman of the Ittefaq Group of Publications. His older son, Mainul Hosein, was a barrister and publisher of The New Nation. The two brothers divided up the Ittefaq in 2010: Manju received the paper, while Mainul took the office building.

== Death and legacy ==
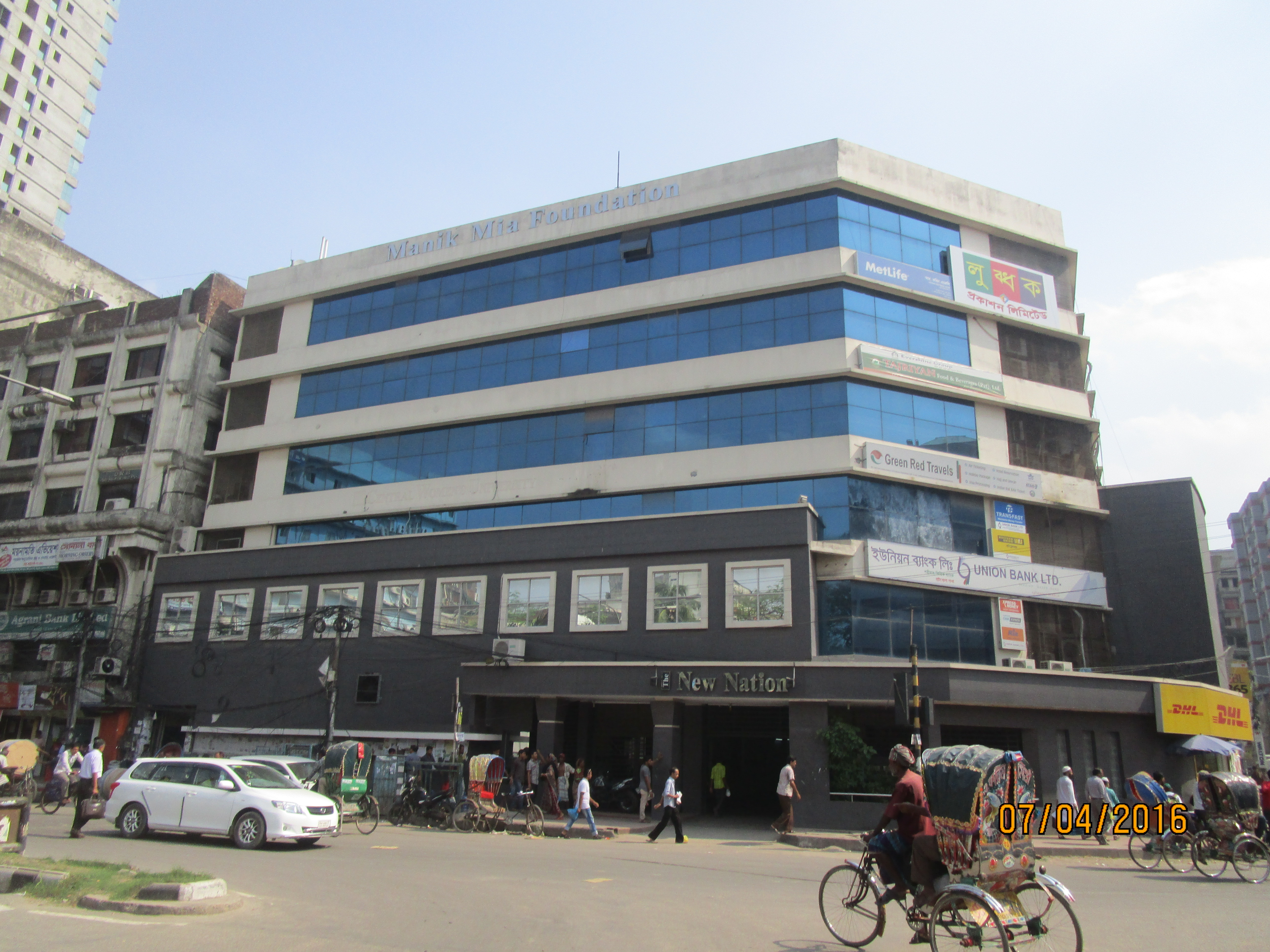
Manik Mia foundation

Hossain died in 1969 at the age of 58 at Rawalpindi's Intercontinental Hotel, in Pakistan, of cardiac arrest. He was buried at the Azimpur graveyard in Dacca. His closest friend and companion at death was A.K. Rafiqul Hussain Khair Miah, who accompanied his dead body to Tejgaon Airport. At the airport, many leaders were present to receive Miah's body. After the Independence of Bangladesh in 1971, the present Manik Mia Avenue of Dhaka was named after him. Mahfuz Anam described Hossain as "Manik Miah's clarity of vision, his powerful articulation, and his ability to communicate with his readers and the public beyond has proven to be unmatched in journalism till date".

== Books ==
- Pakistani Rajnitir Bish Bachhar (Twenty years of Pakistani Politics)
- Nirbachita Bhashan O Nibandha (Selected Speeches and Articles)
