= Ruhul Quddus Kazal =

Bangladeshi lawyer

- Kazal in 2026

18th Attorney General for Bangladesh
- Incumbent
- Assumed office 25 March 2026
- President: Mohammed Shahabuddin; Hafiz Uddin Ahmad (acting); Mirza Fakhrul Islam Alamgir
- Prime Minister: Tarique Rahman
- Preceded by: Md Asaduzzaman

Personal details
- Party: Bangladesh Nationalist Party
- Education: Dhaka University
- Profession: Lawyer, politician

Ruhul Quddus Kazal (born 19 November 1970) is a Bangladeshi lawyer and politician. He is serving as the 18th attorney general for Bangladesh. Earlier, he served as a senior advocate of the Supreme Court of Bangladesh.

== Early life and education ==
Kazal was born on 19 November 1970 in Maheshpur Upazila of Jhenaidah District. He completed his SSC from Maheshpur High School in Jhenaidah in 1986 and HSC from Jessore Cantonment College in 1988. Later he completed his Bachelor of Laws (LL.B.) degree from the University of Dhaka in 1993 and obtained a Master of Laws (LL.M.) degree in 1994.

During his student life, he was involved in journalism and student politics. He served as the Central Legal Affairs Secretary of Jatiyatabadi Chhatra Dal.

Later, he studied in the United Kingdom, where he earned another LL.B. (Honours) degree from the University of London in 2005. He then completed the Bar Vocational Course from City University, London in 2006. In the same year, he was called to the Bar from Lincoln’s Inn and qualified as a Barrister-at-Law.

== Career ==
Ruhul Quddus Kazal began his legal career in 1995 as an advocate at the Dhaka District and Sessions Judge Court. He was enrolled as a lawyer of the High Court Division of the Supreme Court of Bangladesh in 1996 and later became an advocate of the Appellate Division in 2008. In 2023, he was designated as a Senior Advocate of the Supreme Court.

From 2003 to 2006, he served as a Second Secretary at the Bangladesh High Commission in London. He has also played an active role in professional legal organizations and legal politics in Bangladesh. He served as the Secretary of the Supreme Court Bar Association and later as a member of the Bangladesh Bar Council, where he also held the position of chairman of its Executive Committee.

Kazal is associated with the Bangladesh Nationalist Party (BNP). He is a member of the party’s Executive Committee and has served as the Senior Joint Secretary General of the Jatiyatabadi Ainjibi Forum.

On 25 March 2026, he was appointed as the 18th Attorney General of Bangladesh and assumed office on the same day.
