= Pirojpur-2 =

Constituency of Bangladesh's Jatiya Sangsad

Coordinates: 22.49°N 90.06°E

- Constituency for the Jatiya Sangsad
- District: Pirojpur District
- Division: Barisal Division
- Electorate: 409,288 (2026)

Current constituency
- Created: 1984
- Party: Bangladesh Nationalist Party
- Member: Ahammad Sohel Monzoor
- ← 127 Pirojpur-1 129 Pirojpur-3 →

Pirojpur-2 is a constituency represented in the Jatiya Sangsad (National Parliament) of Bangladesh since 2026 by Ahammad Sohel Monzoor of the Bangladesh Nationalist Party.

== Boundaries ==
The constituency encompasses Bhandaria, Kawkhali, and Zianagar upazilas.

== History ==
The constituency was created in 1984 from a Bakerganj constituency when the former Bakerganj District was split into four districts: Bhola, Bakerganj, Jhalokati, and Pirojpur.

Ahead of the 2008 general election, the Election Commission redrew constituency boundaries to reflect population changes revealed by the 2001 Bangladesh census. The 2008 redistricting altered the boundaries of the constituency.

Ahead of the 2014 general election, the Election Commission swapped Zianagar Upazila from Pirojpur-1 to Pirojpur-2, and Nesarabad Upazila from Pirojpur-2 to Pirojpur-1.

== Members of Parliament ==
Election	Member	Party
1986	Mohammad Monirul Islam Monir	Jatiya Party
1988	Anwar Hossain Manju	Jatiya Party
Feb 1996	Nurul Islam Manzur	Bangladesh Nationalist Party
Sep 1996 by-election	Tasmima Hossain	Jatiya Party
2001	Anwar Hossain Manju	Jatiya Party (Manju)
2008	Shah Alam	Awami League
2014	Anwar Hossain Manju	Jatiya Party (Manju)
2024	Mohiuddin Maharaj	Independent
2026	Ahammad Sohel Monzoor	Bangladesh Nationalist Party

== Elections ==
=== Elections in the 2020s ===
General Election 2026: Pirojpur-2
Party	Candidate	Votes	%	±%
BNP	Ahammad Sohel Monzoor	105,185	45.7	N/A
Jamaat	Shameem Sayedee	96,897	42.1	N/A
Independent	Mahmud Hossain	16,219	7.0	N/A
IAB	Md. Abul Kalam Azad	6,697	2.9	N/A
JP(E)	Md. Mahibul Hossain	4,705	2.0	N/A
AB Party	Faisal Khan	390	0.2	N/A
GOP	Md. Anisur Rahman	145	0.1	N/A
Majority		8,288	3.6	N/A
Turnout		230,238	56.21	
BNP gain from Jatiya Party (M)				

=== Elections in the 2010s ===
Anwar Hossain Manju was elected unopposed in the 2014 general election after opposition parties withdrew their candidacies in a boycott of the election.

=== Elections in the 2000s ===
General Election 2008: Pirojpur-2
Party	Candidate	Votes	%	±%
AL	Shah Alam	128,544	65.4	+47.8
BNP	Nurul Islam Manjur	59,428	30.2	+3.3
IAB	Md. Abul Kalam Azad	8,209	4.2	N/A
Independent	Syed Shahidul Haque Jamal	276	0.1	N/A
Majority		69,116	35.2	+13.3
Turnout		196,457	84.4	+30.7
AL gain from Jatiya Party (M)				

General Election 2001: Pirojpur-2
Party	Candidate	Votes	%	±%
Jatiya Party (M)	Anwar Hossain Manju	37,350	48.8	N/A
BNP	Nurul Islam Manjur	20,594	26.9	+25.1
AL	A. Hakim	13,453	17.6	−17.8
IJOF	Md. Shahjahan Hawlader	4,915	6.4	N/A
Independent	Syed Khalilur Rahman	154	0.2	N/A
Bangladesh People's Congress	Shah Syed Md. Nurul Huda Jamader	56	0.1	N/A
Majority		16,756	21.9	−5.5
Turnout		76,522	53.7	+0.7
Jatiya Party (M) gain from JP(E)				

=== Elections in the 1990s ===
Anwar Hossain Manju stood for two seats in the 1996 general election: Jhalokati-1 and Pirojpur-2. After winning both, he chose to represent Jhalokati-1 and quit Pirojpur-2, triggering a by-election in Pirojpur-2. Tasmima Hossain, his wife, was elected in a September 1996 by-election.

Pirojpur-2 by-election, September 1996
Party	Candidate	Votes	%	±%
JP(E)	Tasmima Hossain	33,332	62.8	+10.8
AL	M. Matiur Rahman	18,801	35.4	+14.0
BNP	Abdul Wahab Howlader	930	1.8	−9.6
Majority		14,531	27.4	−3.2
Turnout		53,063	53.0	−1.5
JP(E) hold				

General Election June 1996: Pirojpur-2
Party	Candidate	Votes	%	±%
JP(E)	Anwar Hossain Manju	33,519	52.0	−4.0
AL	Altaf Hossain	13,811	21.4	−2.4
BNP	Nurul Islam Manjur	7,385	11.4	+2.0
Jamaat	A. B. M. Khairul Islam	6,346	9.8	+2.7
IAB	Nurul Huda	2,395	3.7	N/A
WPB	Khan Md. Rustom Ali	318	0.5	+0.1
BML	Md. Abdur Satter Hang	203	0.3	N/A
Zaker Party	Md. Zakir Hossain	192	0.3	−0.1
Independent	Monjur Hassan Mahmud Salim	126	0.2	N/A
FP	S. M. Mozibur Rahman	76	0.1	0.0
Independent	Shahadat Hossain	71	0.1	N/A
Jana Dal	Shah Alam	65	0.1	N/A
Majority		19,708	30.6	−1.6
Turnout		64,507	64.5	+19.2
JP(E) hold				

General Election 1991: Pirojpur-2
Party	Candidate	Votes	%	±%
JP(E)	Anwar Hossain Manju	36,651	56.0	
AL	A. Hakim	15,560	23.8	
BNP	Bazlul Haq Harun	6,140	9.4	
Jamaat	Abul Bashar	4,659	7.1	
IOJ	A. Matin	1,148	1.8	
UCL	Nimai Karishna Mondol	449	0.7	
WPB	Firoz	291	0.4	
Zaker Party	Mahbubur Rahman	266	0.4	
Ganatantri Party	Amalendu Bepari	202	0.3	
FP	S. M. Mozibur Rahman	58	0.1	
Independent	Khan Enayet Karim	45	0.1	
Majority		21,091	32.2	
Turnout		65,469	45.3	
JP(E) hold				
