= The Daily Ittefaq =

Bangladeshi daily newspaper

- 10 September 2023 cover of The Daily Ittefaq.
- Type: Daily newspaper
- Format: Broadsheet
- Owner: Ittefaq Group of Publications Ltd.
- Founders: Abdul Hamid Khan Bhasani; Yar Mohammad Khan
- Publisher: Tareen Hossain
- Editor: Tasmima Hossain
- Founded: 24 December 1953; 72 years ago
- Political alignment: Secular, Liberal
- Language: Bengali
- Headquarters: 40, Karwan Bazar, Dhaka 1215; Kazlarpar Demra, Dhaka 1232
- Website: ittefaq.com.bd

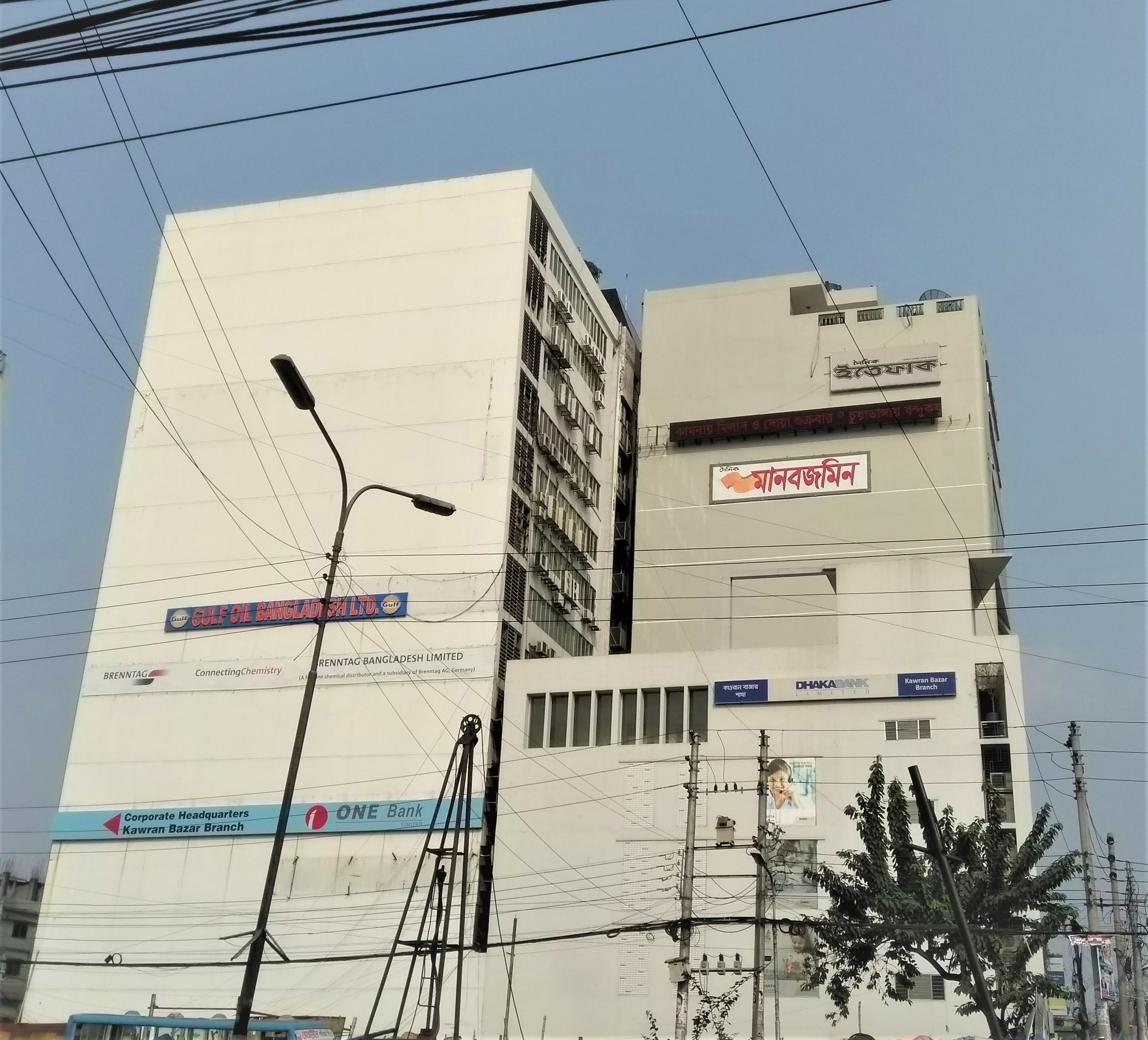
Headquarter of Ittefaq with Manab Zamin in Karwan Bazar

The Daily Ittefaq (Bengali: দৈনিক ইত্তেফাক, romanized: Dôinik Ittefāk, Bangla pronunciation: [ˈd̪ɔinik ˈit̪ːefak]) is a Bengali-language daily newspaper. Founded in 1949 by Abdul Hamid Khan Bhashani and Yar Mohammad Khan, it is the oldest and one of the most circulated newspapers in Bangladesh. The newspaper format is broadsheet, and is printed by Ittefaq Group of Publications Limited.

== Pre-1971 ==
Ittefaq was initially published weekly. On 15 August 1949, the first issue of Ittefaq was off the press. Bhashani served as the original editor. Later, Bhashani and Yar Mohammad Khan appointed Manik Miah as the editor. It became a daily on 24 December 1953 under the editorship of Tofazzal Hossain.

During the time of United Pakistan, it publicised the negligence and colonial mindset of Pakistani leaders to East Pakistan. As a result, the government acted against its editors and journalists. Hossain's post-editorial column 'Rajnaitik Mancha' (political platform) became popular in East Pakistan. The Daily Ittefaq played a vital role during the Bengali language movement era. Ittefaq had a significant role in the 1954 general elections, and it contributed to the victory of the United Front. From Ayub Khan to Yahya Khan, Ittefaq always strongly opposed all military rule of Pakistan.

The Ittefaq supported the six point movement of Awami League during the mid-1960s and helped publish its ideas. Ittefaq quickly emerged as the voice of East Pakistani citizens. President Ayub Khan censored its publication from 17 June to 11 July 1966, and then again from 17 July 1966 to 9 February 1969. Tofazzal Hossain was imprisoned several times.

Hossain died on 1 June 1969; the newspaper was subsequently managed by his two sons, Mainul Hosein and Anwar Hossain Manju.

== Role in Liberation War of Bangladesh ==
The Ittefaq office was burnt down and completely demolished on 25 March 1971, by the Pakistan Army as part of Operation Searchlight. It was all in ruins and there was not a sign of life there. The newspaper received Taka 100,000 (equivalent to £8,300 in 1971) as compensation from the Pakistan government. This enabled Barrister Mainul Hosein to resume publishing, under the watchful eye of the authorities, on 21 May 1971, from the Daily Pakistan Press. For the remainder of the Bangladesh Liberation War, the paper was a mouthpiece for Yahya and Tikka Khan and severely criticised the freedom fighters.

After the newspaper The Daily Sangram called Serajuddin Hossain (also transliterated Seraj Uddin Hossain), executive editor of The Daily Ittefaq, the editor was abducted on 10 December 1971 and never found. During Bangladesh's war crimes trials in 2012, Ali Ahsan Mohammad Mojaheed, a Jamaat-e-Islami party member, was charged with Hossain's murder.

== Present ==
Ownership was returned to Manik Mia's sons after nationalization on 24 August 1975. Tasmima Hossain is the editor. The Daily Ittefaq features all the standard sections of a modern daily newspaper like political news, economic, sports, education, entertainment, and general and local news.

== Online edition ==
This newspaper offers a daily Bengali electronic edition on its website and an English edition aimed at a younger audience.

This news portal also has E-paper.

== See also ==
- List of newspapers in Bangladesh
- Bangladesh Pratidin
- Bengali-language newspapers
- Samakal
- Prothom Alo
- Daily Inqilab
- Daily Brahmanbaria
- Dainik Bangla
- Janakantha
- Daily Nayadiganta
- The Daily Sangram
- Sylheter Dak
