= Sharif Uddin Chaklader =

Bangladeshi judge

Justice of the High Court Division of Bangladesh

Personal details
- Profession: Judge

Sharif Uddin Chaklader is a retired judge of the High Court Division of Bangladesh Supreme Court.

== Career ==
Chaklader was the assistant attorney general of Bangladesh in 1991.

Chaklader was one of 19 judges who filed a petition with the Bangladesh Supreme Court against a High Court Division verdict which ordered the government to reappoint 10 High Court judges whose appointment was not confirmed by the Bangladesh Nationalist Party. In October 2008, bombs were left at Chaklader's residence at the Judges' Complex on Park Avenue in Kakrail. Barrister Rafique-ul Huq condemned the presence of a major at the Bangladesh Supreme Court deciding the cause list of the court violating policy at a discussion organized by the Bangladesh Supreme Court Bar Association protesting the discovery of bombs at Chaklader's residence. In October 2008, Chaklader and justice Imdadul Haq Azad were transferred from the bench dealing with criminal cases to one dealing with death penalty after granting bail to more than a 100 politicians detained by the caretaker government.

In February 2014, Chaklader and Justice AKM Shahidul Huq refused to hear a bank loan case of Jamuna Bank Limited after a minister called seeking favor for one of the parities in the case. This led the Bangladesh Supreme Court Bar Association to call for the termination of said government minister. On 25 May 2014, Chaklader abstained from work following a call of the Jatiyatabadi Ainjibi Forum, a pro-Bangladesh Nationalist Party lawyers association.

Chief Justice Surendra Kumar Sinha sought an explanation from Chaklader and Justice A. K. M. Shahidul Huq who made some observations on the eviction of former prime minister Khaleda Zia in April 2015.

Chaklader retired in 2016.
