= Khandakar Muhammad Illyas =

Khandakar Muhammad Illyas (1923–1995) was a writer, left-wing politician, and supporter of ties between Bangladesh and the Soviet Union.

== Early life ==
Illyas was born on 3 May 1923.

== Career ==
Illyas toured China with Sheikh Mujibur Rahman, Tofazzal Hossain Manik Miah, and Ataur Rahman Khan in 1952 to attend Asia and Pacific Rim Peace Conference.

Illyas was a leader of the Bangladesh-USSR society. He served as a member of the Central Committee of Bangladesh Krishak Sramik Awami League, the one party government established by Awami League in 1975.

After the Assassination of Sheikh Mujibur Rahman in the 15 August 1975 Bangladesh coup d'état Illyas was arrested by the new military regime in 1976.

Illyas wrote a book about the time Abdul Hamid Khan Bhashani spent in exile in Europe titled Jokhon Bashani Europe-eh in 1978. He also wrote the Mujibbad. He served as the editor and publisher of Desher Dak, the newspaper founded by Bhashani, and friend of Tassduq Ahmad. He was considered part of the Bhashani group.

Illyas wrote Bangladesher Samaj Biplobe Bangabandhur Darshan about the impact of the philosophy of Sheikh Mujibur Rahman on socialism in Bangladesh.

== Death ==
Illyas died on 17 November 1995 at the BIRDEM hospital in Dhaka, Bangladesh.
