= Mahbubul Alam (journalist) =

Bangladeshi journalist and politician (1936–2014)

Ambassador of Bangladesh to Bhutan
- In office 3 January 1984 – 27 March 1986
- Preceded by: Mohiuddin Ahmed Jaigirdar
- Succeeded by: Abul Hassan Mahmood Ali

Personal details
- Born: 5 February 1936 Mymensingh, Bengal Province, British India
- Died: 2 June 2014 (aged 78) Dhaka, Bangladesh

Mahbubul Alam (5 February 1936 – 6 June 2014) was an advisor of the Caretaker Government of Bangladesh and editor of The Independent.

== Early life & education ==
Alam was born on 5 February 1936 in Mymensingh District, East Bengal, British India. He studied political science at the University of Dhaka.

== Career ==
Alam joined the Associated Press in 1957. He worked for the Plain Truth show on Radio Pakistan during the Bangladesh Liberation War in 1971. The show produced war propaganda for the Pakistan Army. He was briefly the press secretary to President Sheikh Mujibur Rahman but that came to an end due to controversy over his role during the war.

Alam was the press minister at the Embassy of Bangladesh, Washington, D.C. and High Commission of Bangladesh, London. He was the ambassador of Bangladesh to Bhutan. Under President Hussain Muhammad Ershad, he was the director general of the external affairs division of the Ministry of Foreign Affairs.

He was the editor and managing director of the state owned Bangladesh Sangbad Sangstha. He served as the editor of The New Nation. Alam became the editor of The Independent in the early 1990s. He was the president of the Newspaper Owners Association of Bangladesh.

Alam was the Information Advisor in the Caretaker government led by President Iajuddin Ahmed from 2006 to 2007. He served as the editor of The Independent. He was an advisor to BEXIMCO Group.

== Personal life ==
Alam's wife and three daughters live in the United States.

== Death ==
Alam died on 6 June 2014 at the BIRDEM hospital in Dhaka, Bangladesh. He was buried at Azimpur New Graveyard.
