= Rokanuddin Mahmud =

Bangladeshi lawyer

Rokanuddin Mahmud is a Bangladeshi Barrister and former Bangladesh Supreme Court Bar Association president. He is the former vice-chairman of Bangladesh Bar Council.

== Early life ==
Mahmud was born on 14 July 1946 in Chittagong District, East Bengal, British Raj. He completed his MA and Bachelor of laws (LL.B) from the University of Dhaka. He obtained Bar-at-Law from Lincoln's Inn in 1972. He completed an LL.M with high distinction from the Vrije Universiteit Brussel, Belgium.

== Career ==
In 1973, Mahmud enrolled as an advocate in Dhaka district & sessions judge court. He started practicing in the Bangladesh Supreme Court in 1975. In the first phase of his legal career, he worked as a junior associate with prominent Bangladeshi lawyer Syed Ishtiaque Ahmed.

From 2000 to 2005, Mahmud was affiliated with the International Court of Arbitration. He served two terms as the President of the Bangladesh Supreme Court Bar Association from 2003 to 2005. In June 2003, he cautiously welcomed the appointment of Justice KM Hasan as the chief justice of Bangladesh superseding two judges, justice M Ruhul Amin and justice Mohammad Fazlul Karim, and asked the government to appoint the most senior judge as the chief justice in the future. He represented former Prime Minister Sheikh Hasina in a corruption case filed over the purchase of BNS Bangabandhu. He ask lawyers to seize the offices of executive magistrates who send journalists to jail on the orders of government politicians in 2004.

In December 2005, Mahmud criticized the government passing an amendment to the Bangladesh Telecommunications Act, 2001 allowing law enforcement officers to eavesdrop phone calls and said that it created the potential for abuse. He criticized the Bangladesh Nationalist Party appointing 17 additional judges to the High Court Division with the input of the chief justice and accused the government of politicizing the judiciary in August 2006. He was the convenor of Peshajibi Samannay Parishad. In November 2006, he rushed to the police station with Barrister Amir-Ul Islam following the arrest of activists of Peshajibi Nari Samaj (Professional Women's Society) who were marching to the Election Commission with a memorandum.

From 2004 to 2007, Mahmud was the vice Chairman of the Bangladesh Bar Council. In January 2007, Mahmud was accused of vandalizing the premises of the Supreme Court.

Mahmud spoke in favor of 2014 Bangladeshi general election at a hearing in the Bangladesh High Court. He represented Dr Muhammad Yunus in a case challenging the government of Bangladesh removing him from Grameen Bank in 2011.

In 2020, Mahmud represented Matiur Rahman, editor of Prothom Alo, in a case filed over the accidental death of college student at a program of the newspaper.
