= Dakshin Telikhali =

Village in Bhandaria Upazila

Coordinates: 22.4166°N 89.9652°E

Dakshin Telikhali (Bengali: দক্ষিণ তেলিখালী) is a village in Bhandaria Upazila, which is in Pirojpur District of Barisal Division in southwestern Bangladesh.
