= Ahammad Sohel Monzoor =

Bangladeshi politician

- আহমেদ সোহেল মনজুর

Minister of State for Housing and Public Works
- Incumbent
- Assumed office 17 February 2026
- Prime Minister: Tarique Rahman
- Preceded by: Adilur Rahman Khan

Member of Parliament
- Incumbent
- Assumed office 17 February 2026
- Preceded by: Mohiuddin Maharaj
- Constituency: Pirojpur-2

Personal details
- Born: 1 January 1970 (age 56) Pirojpur, East Pakistan now Bangladesh
- Party: Bangladesh Nationalist Party

Ahammad Sohel Monzoor Sumon (born 1 January 1970) is a Bangladesh Nationalist Party politician and the incumbent Jatiya Sangsad member representing the Pirojpur-2 constituency since February 2026. He is currently serving as state minister at the Ministry of Housing and Public Works.
