= Ikri =

- Location in Bangladesh
- Coordinates: 22°24′36″N 89°58′48″E
- Country: Bangladesh
- Division: Barisal Division
- District: Pirojpur District
  - Summer (DST): UTC+6 (Bangladesh Time)

Ikri (Bengali: ইকড়ি) is a village in Ikri Union of Bhandaria Upazila, which is in the Pirojpur District of the Barisal Division of southwestern Bangladesh.
