= K. S. Nabi =

Bangladeshi politician (1941/1942–2018)

- কে . এস. নবী

9th Attorney General of Bangladesh
- In office 31 July 1996 – 30 May 1998
- President: Abdur Rahman Biswas; Shahabuddin Ahmed
- Preceded by: M. Nurullah
- Succeeded by: Mahmudul Islam

Personal details
- Born: 1941 or 1942 (age 83–84)
- Died: 8 July 2018 Dhaka, Bangladesh
- Party: Bangladesh Awami League

Kazi Shahidun Nabi (1941 or 1942 – 8 July 2018) was a Bangladeshi lawyer who served as the 9th Attorney General of Bangladesh from 1996 until 1998.

== Career ==
Nabi was called to the bar at Lincoln's Inn, London in 1961. He served as a faculty member of Central Law College in Dhaka. He was enrolled to Bangladesh Supreme Court in 1986.

In the Seventh National Parliamentary Elections in 1996, Nabi was a candidate of Bangladesh Awami League from the Munshiganj-1 constituency and lost to A. Q. M. Badruddoza Chowdhury. He served as the chairmen of the Bangladesh Bar Council during 1996–1998.

In 1999, Nabi served as the lawyer of Bangladeshi businessman Aziz Mohammad Bhai after he was arrested by the Special Branch of police in the allegation of being involved in film actor Sohel Chowdhury's murder, using women in smuggling and supply of secret government information and documents abroad.

== Personal life ==
Nabi is the son of one of the cousins of Humayun Rashid Choudhury, former speaker of the Bangladesh National Parliament.

Nabi died on 8 July 2018 in his Dhanmondi residence in Dhaka.
