= Aboul Khan =

American politician

Aboul Bashar Khan
- আবুল বশর খান

Member of the New Hampshire House of Representatives from the Rockingham 20th district
- Incumbent
- Assumed office 2016
- In office 2012–2014

Personal details
- Born: Aboul Bashar Khan; March 1, 1960 (age 66) Bhandaria, Bakerganj district, East Pakistan
- Citizenship: United States
- Party: Republican
- Occupation: Politician and businessman

Aboul Bashar Khan (Bengali: আবুল বশর খান; born March 1, 1960) is an American politician of Bangladeshi descent. He is currently serving as a member of the New Hampshire House of Representatives, representing Rockingham District 20 (Hampton Falls and Seabrook) since 2016. He previously represented the same district from 2012 to 2014.

== Early life and education ==
Khan was born on March 1, 1960, to a Bengali Muslim family of Khans in Bhandaria, Firozpur, then a part of the Bakerganj district of East Pakistan (present-day Barisal division, Bangladesh). He is the eldest of the two sons and two daughters of former defense secretary Mahbub Uddin Khan Kanchan and his wife Shahanara Begum.

Khan passed the matriculation examination from the Muslim Government High School, Dhaka, in 1976. After completing his higher secondary education from Notre Dame College in 1978, he was admitted to the Department of Political Science at the University of Dhaka. After studying there for three years, he moved to the United States on a student visa on January 10, 1981, and settled there.

== Electoral history ==
2016 Rockingham District 20 general election
Party	Candidate	Votes	%
Republican	Francis Chase (incumbent)	2,470	24.61
Republican	Jason Janvrin	2,408	23.99
Republican	Aboul Khan	2,829	28.18
Democratic	Mark Preston	2,331	23.22
Total votes		10,038	100.0
Republican hold			
Republican hold			
Republican hold			

2018 Rockingham District 20 general election
Party	Candidate	Votes	%
Republican	Aboul Khan (incumbent)	2,233	20.3
Republican	William Fowler	2,053	18.7
Republican	Max Abramson	1,980	18.0
Democratic	Patricia O'Keefe	1,819	16.6
Democratic	Greg Marrow	1,511	16.8
Democratic	Denis Rice	1,385	12.6
Total votes		10,981	100.0
Republican hold			
Republican hold			
Republican hold			

2020 Rockingham District 20 general election
Party	Candidate	Votes	%
Republican	Aboul Khan (incumbent)	3,444	21.6
Republican	Tim Baxter	3,292	20.6
Republican	Tina Harley	3,182	19.9
Democratic	Patricia O'Keefe	2,448	15.3
Democratic	Greg Marrow	1,905	11.9
Democratic	Louis Flynn	1,683	10.5
Total votes		15,954	100.0
Republican hold			
Republican hold			
Republican hold			
