= Ayub Ali =

Bangladeshi educator (1919–1995)

Abul Khayr Muhammad Ayub Ali Muhaddith

Personal life
- Born: Abul Khair Muhammad Ayub Ali; 1919 Telikhali, Pirojpur District, Backergunge District, Bengal Presidency
- Died: 1995 (aged 75–76)
- Education: Al-Azhar University; University of Dhaka

Religious life
- Religion: Islam
- Denomination: Sunni
- Jurisprudence: Hanafi
- Creed: Maturidi

Muslim leader
- Awards: Ekushey Padak
- Arabic name
- Personal (Ism): Muḥammad Ayyub ʿAlī محمد أيوب علي
- Patronymic (Nasab): ibn ʿAbd al-Wāḥid بن عبد الواحد
- Teknonymic (Kunya): Abū al-Khayr أبو الخير
- Toponymic (Nisba): al-Barīsālī البريسالي al-Bangālī البنغالي

Principal of Government Madrasah-e-Alia, Dhaka
- In office 1973–1979
- Preceded by: Yaqub Sharif
- Succeeded by: Yaqub Sharif

Principal of Sylhet Government Alia Madrasah
- In office 27 October 1970 – 19 July 1973
- Preceded by: Jalaluddin Ahmad
- Succeeded by: Yaqub Sharif

Principal of Rajshahi Madrasa
- In office 1958–1969

Abū al-Khayr Muḥammad Ayyūb ʿAlī al-Māturīdī (Arabic: أبو الخير محمد أيوب علي الماتريدي; 1919–1995), or simply Ayub Ali (Bengali: আইয়ূব আলী), was a Bangladeshi Islamic scholar, author and educationist. He was awarded the Ekushey Padak in 1976 by the Government of Bangladesh.

== Early life and education ==
Ali was born in 1919, (Note: Banglapedia suggests his year of birth to be 1887.) to a Bengali Muslim family in the village of Telikhali in Firozpur, Backergunge District, Bengal Presidency. His father, Abdul Wahed, was a moulvi, and his mother, Abida Khatun, was a housewife.

== Education ==
Ali studied at the Calcutta Alia Madrasa, receiving his alim certification in 1933, fazil in 1936 and kamil in 1938. He then enrolled at the University of Dhaka where he earned his BA Honors and MA degrees in Islamic Studies in 1943 and 1944 respectively. Ali received the Raja Kalinarayan Scholarship (one of the most prestigious scholarships at the university). He obtained a second MA degree in Persian from the same university in 1950. He then studied at the Al-Azhar University in Cairo, Egypt where he received his Alimiyyah Diploma in 1953 and Ph.D. in 1955.

== Career ==
Ali joined Dhaka College as a lecturer in 1944. He then served as the principal of the Rajshahi Madrasa between 1958 and 1969, the Sylhet Government Alia Madrasah between 1970 and 1973, and then at Government Madrasah-e-Alia, Dhaka from 1973 to 1979. He has written several books in English, Bengali and Arabic. In 1976, he was awarded the Ekushey Padak by the Government of Bangladesh for his literary contributions.

== Death ==
Ali died in 1995.

== Works ==
- History of Traditional Islamic education in Bangladesh (in English)
- عقيدة الإسلام والإمام الماتريدي ʿAqīdah al-Islām wa al-Imām al-Māturīdī (1983)
