= The Pain Gap =

2021 nonfiction book by Anushay Hossain

- Author: Anushay Hossain
- Audio read by: Priya Ayyar
- Publisher: Simon & Schuster
- Publication date: 2021
- Pages: 288
- ISBN: 9781982177775

The Pain Gap: How Sexism and Racism in Healthcare Kill Women is a nonfiction book about women's healthcare in the United States, written by Anushay Hossain and published by Simon & Schuster in 2021.

== Background ==
Anushay Hossain previously worked as a policy analyst with the Feminist Majority Foundation, and as of 2021 was working as a freelance journalist and podcast host of Spilling Chai. After her experience with healthcare related to pregnancy and giving birth in the United States, she began conducting research and interviews for a book with a focus on those issues, but as her research developed, she expanded her focus to women's healthcare more generally.

== Synopsis ==
The book includes Hossain's description of her childhood in Bangladesh, and the influence from her mother Tasmima Hossain. She also describes her own experience with United States healthcare related to giving birth, descriptions of other cases, and statistics related to national and global disparities in healthcare.

== Reception ==
In a review for Library Journal, Elizabeth Eastwood writes, "The book's tone effectively conveys Hossain's determination to change Western medicine's model of care, particularly for patients who are women of color; it's a call to arms for patients, to advocate for themselves and others", and "Hossain synthesizes a great deal of qualitative and quantitative data in this effective overview of bias in American medicine, particularly women's and maternal healthcare."

In The Daily Star, Jackie Kabir writes, "One of the most striking pieces of information we get from her book is that the USA, which seems to be a vehement advocate of human rights and equality, in reality does not take women patients very seriously." In South Asia Journal, Arnold Zeitlin writes, "Hossain has written an angry book that sheds light on an issue that confronts families the world over."

== Editions ==
- 2021, Simon & Schuster/Tiller Press (ISBN 9781982177775)
- 2022, Simon & Schuster/Simon Element (ISBN 9781982177799), paperback
- 2022, Simon & Schuster/Simon Element (ISBN 9781982177782), ebook
- 2022, Simon & Schuster Audio (ISBN 9781797134703), audiobook
