= Fida M. Kamal =

Bangladeshi lawyer

- ফিদা এম. কামাল

13th Attorney General for Bangladesh
- In office 5 February 2007 – 16 July 2008
- Appointed by: Iajuddin Ahmed
- President: Iajuddin Ahmed
- Preceded by: A. J. Mohammad Ali
- Succeeded by: Salahuddin Ahmad

Fida M. Kamal is a Bangladeshi lawyer and former Attorney General for Bangladesh.

== Career ==
Kamal is a former Additional Attorney General. He served as the Attorney General of Bangladesh from January 2007 to July 2008. He resigned due to differences with the military-backed caretaker government of Bangladesh.
