= Bangladesh Supreme Court Bar Association =

Bar Association

- Logo of Bangladesh Supreme Court Bar Association

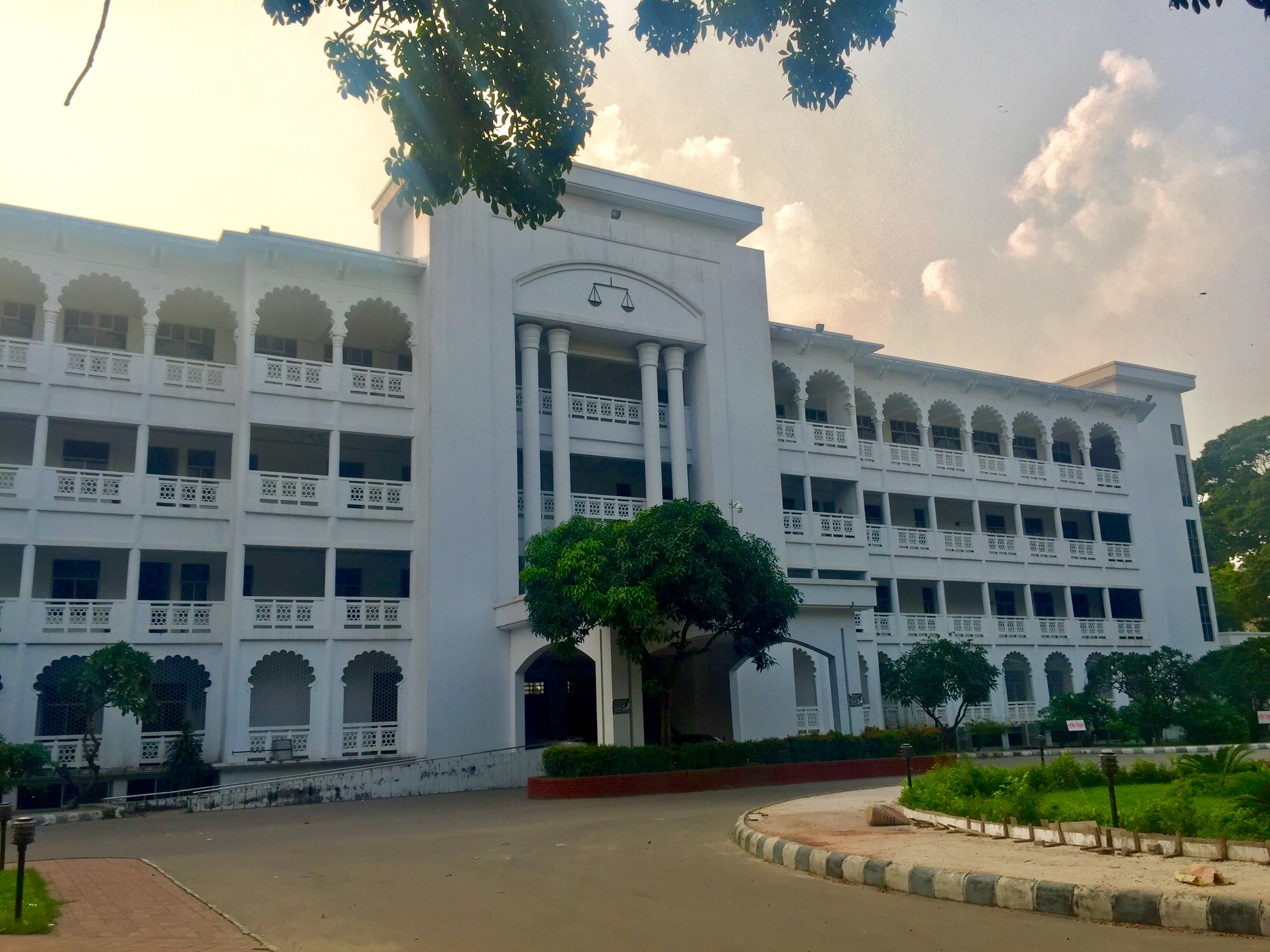
- Building of Bangladesh Supreme Court
- Formation: 1972
- Headquarters: Dhaka, Bangladesh
- Region served: Bangladesh
- Official language: Bengali
- President: Mahbub Uddin Khokon
- Website: scba.org.bd

The Bangladesh Supreme Court Bar Association (Bengali: বাংলাদেশ সুপ্রিম কোর্ট আইনজীবী সমিতি) is a professional association of Bangladesh Supreme Court lawyers.

== History ==
The Bangladesh Supreme Court Bar Association issued a statement expressing concern over the construction of Farakka Barrage by India near the border and preventing the flow of water to Bangladesh in February 1976.

In 1987, the President of association was detained and placed in Dhaka Central Jail as part of a wider crackdown on dissent against the dictatorship of President Hussain Mohammad Ershad. In 1999, President of the association, Habibul Islam Bhuiyan, moved a petition in the Appellate Division of the Supreme Court alleging statements of Prime Minister Sheikh Hasina was contemptuous of the court.

On 2 March 2005, Chief Justice of Bangladesh J. R. Mudassir Husain and other judges of the Supreme Court boycotted the break-up party of the association. President of the association, Barrister Rokanuddin Mahmud, reported that the judges boycotted the event as they felt certain judges were not invited respectfully.

In October 2017, the association expressed concern over the sudden leave of Chief Justice Surendra Kumar Sinha. According to President Advocate Zainul Abedin they failed in their attempt to meet Sinha which his described as alarming.

President of the Bangladesh Supreme Court Bar Association, Advocate Zainul Abedin, demanded that the government cancel the 11th national election and hold a new election on 3 January 2019 citing irregularities in the election. he stated that the new elections should be held under a neutral non-partisan government.

In April 2020, the association started providing interest free loans to lawyers facing financial difficulties during the COVID-19 pandemic in Bangladesh. On 9 October 2020, President of the Supreme Court Bar Association, AM Amin Uddin, was appointed the Attorney General of Bangladesh.

On 10 November 2020, the association sent a letter to the Chief Justice Syed Mahmud Hossain requesting mediation in a dispute between judges and lawyers. Two lawyers, Syed Sayedul Haque Suman and Ishrat Hasan, had appeared before the chief justice and according to them were treated with "discourteous behaviour" about which they posted on Facebook. Justice Gobinda Chandra Tagore and Justice Mohammad Ullah issued a contempt of court ruling against them over the Facebook posts.

On 13 March 2021, Abdul Matin Khasru, Member of Parliament and former Minister, was elected President of the association. After the death of Abdul Matin Khasru, in a Special General Meeting held on 04.05.2021 A. M Amin Uddin, Senior Advocate has been elected as President of the Supreme Court Bar Association for the third time.

On 27 April 2022, Advocate Md. Momtaz Uddin Fakir was elected president and Abdun Noor Dulal was elected Secretary of the association.

In March 2024, Mahbub Uddin Khokon was elected as the president of the association.

== List of presidents ==
Name	Term start	Term end	Reference
A. K. Fazlul Huq	1948	1956	
Nurul Huq Chowdhury	1956	1958	
Mohammed Nurul Huda	1958	1962	
Tafazzal Ali	1962	1964	
M. H. Khondker	1964	1965	
Abdus Salam	1965	1966	
Abdus Salam Khan	1966	1968	
A. S. M. Mofakhar	1968	1969	
Ataur Rahman Khan	1969	1970	
Asaduzzaman Khan	1970	1972	
Ahmed Sobhan	1972	1974	
Mirza Golam Hafiz	1973	1974	
Aleem-Al-Razee	1974	1975	
Tafazzal Ali	1975	1976	
T. H. Khan	1977	1978	
Syed Ishtiaq Ahmed	1978	1979	
Khondker Mahubuddin Ahmed	1979	1980	
Rafiqur Rahman	1980	1981	
Mohammad Yeasin	1981	1982	
Serajul Huq	1982	1983	
Shamsul Huq Choudhury	1983	1989	
Kamal Hossain	1990	1991	
Rafiqur Rahman	1991	1992	
Khondker Mahubuddin Ahmed	1992	1993	
Kazi Golam Mahbub	1993	1994	
M. Hafizullah	1994	1995	
Shaukat Ali Khan	1996	1997	
Nazmul Huda	1997	1998	
Habibul Islam Bhuiyan	1998	1999	
Shafique Ahmed	1999	2000	
Mainul Hosein	2000	2001	
Abdul Baset Majumder	2001	2002	
Mohammad Ozair Farooq	2002	2003	
Rokanuddin Mahmud	2003	2005	
Mahbubey Alam	2005	2006	
M. Amir-ul Islam	2006	2007	
Shafique Ahmed	2008	2009	
A. F. M. Mesbahuddin	2009	2010	
Khandker Mahbub Hossain	2010	2012	
Zainul Abedin	2012	2013	
A. J. Mohammad Ali	2013	2014	
Khandker Mahbub Hossain	2014	2016	
Muhammad Yusuf Hussain Humayun	2016	2017	
Zainul Abedin	2017	2019	
A. M. Amin Uddin	2019	2022	
Abdul Matin Khasru	2021	2022	
Momtazuddin Fakir	2022	2023	
Mahbub Uddin Khokon	2024		

== Secretaries ==
Name	Term start	Term end	Reference
Dinesh Chandra Roy	1948	1949	
Syed Jalal Uddin Hossain Khandaker	1949	1950	
Syed Modares Ali	1950	1951	
B. A. Siddiqui	1951	1952	
M. H. Khondker	1952	1953	
Muhammad Saydur Rahman	1953	1954	
Kemaluddin Hossain	1953	1954	
Syed Modares Ali	1954	1955	
Md. Moinul Huq	1955	1956	
Mohammad Jane Alam	1956	1957	
Abu Saadat Mohammed Sayem	1957	1958	
Abdul Wadud Chowdhury	1958	1959	
Abu Saadat Mohammed Sayem	1959	1960	
Ruhul Islam	1960	1962	
Nainuddin Ahmed	1962	1963	
A. H. M. Abdur Rashid	1962	1964	
Siddique Ahmed Chowdhury	1864	1965	
Muhammad Abdur Rob	1965	1966	
A. F. M. Abdur Rahman Chowdhury	1966	1968	
Muhammad Abdul Haque	1968	1969	
Tufail Ahmed	1969	1971	
Mohammad Yeasin	1971	1972	
Shamsul Huq Choudhury	1972	1973	
Mohammad Yeasin	1973	1975	
A. K. M. Shafiqur Rahman	1975	1976	
H. K. Abdul Hye	1976	1977	
Shah Md. Sharif	1977	1978	
M. Hafizullah	1978	1979	
Syed Abul Mokarrum	1979	1980	
Md. Ruhul Amin	1980	1981	
Habibul Islam Bhuiyan	1981	1982	
Md. Fazlul Karim	1982	1983	
Giusuddin Ahmed	1983	1984	
Abu Sayeed Ahammad	1984	1985	
A. Y. Masihuzzaman	1985	1986	
Abdul Baset Majumder	1986	1988	
M. A. Wahhab Miah	1988	1990	
Md. Fazlul Haque	1990	1991	
A. F. M. Mesbahuddin	1991	1992	
A. F. M. Ali Asgar	1992	1993	
Mahbubey Alam	1993	1994	
Mohammad Ozair Farooq	1994	1995	
S. M. Munir	1995	1996	
Nozrul Islam Chowdhury	1996	1997	
Zainul Abedin	1997	1998	
Abdul Awal	1998	1999	
Md. Saidur Rahman	1999	2000	
Md. Shahidul Karim Siddique	2000	2001	
Md. Momtazuddin Fakir	2001	2002	
M. A. Hafiz	2002	2003	
Md. Mahbub Ali	2003	2004	
Bashir Ahmed	2004	2005	
M. Enayetur Rahim	2005	2006	
A. M. Amin Uddin	2006	2007	
Md. Nurul Islam Sujan	2008	2009	
S. M. Rezaul Karim	2009	2010	
Md. Bodruddoza	2010	2012	
Momtaz Uddin Ahmed Mehedi	2012	2013	
Mahbub Uddin Khokon	2013	2020	
Ruhul Quddus Kazal	2020	2022	
Md. Abdun Nur Dulal	2022	2023	
Shah Monjurul Hoque	2024	2025	

== See also ==
- Bangladesh Bar Council
