= Bangladesh Jatiotabadi Ainjibi Forum =

Lawyers firm aligned with Bangladesh Nationalist Party (BNP)

- Abbreviation: BJAF
- Formation: 1979
- Headquarters: 80, Bhashani Bhaban, Naya Paltan Dhaka, Bangladesh
- Region served: Bangladesh
- President: Zainul Abedin
- Parent organization: Bangladesh Nationalist Party

Bangladesh Jatiotabadi Ainjibi Forum (Bengali: বাংলাদেশ জাতীয়তাবাদী আইনজীবী ফোরাম, lit. 'Bangladesh Nationalist Lawyers Forum') is a forum of lawyers aligned with the Bangladesh Nationalist Party.

== History ==
Bangladesh Jatiyatabadi Ainjibi Forum was founded by Tafazzal Hossain Khan after he joined the Bangladesh Nationalist Party which was founded by President Ziaur Rahman. Khan was elected to parliament in 1979.

Bangladesh Jatiyatabadi Ainjibi Forum, backed by the Bangladesh Nationalist Party, stands in Bar Association elections against the Awami League backed Bangladesh Sammilita Ainjibi Samannay Parishad.

In November 2005, Bangladesh Jatiyatabadi Ainjibi Forum created a new committee led by Aminul Haque and Tafazzal Hossain Khan, Minister of Post and Telecommunications of the Bangladesh Nationalist Party government.

On 25 May 2014, High Court Division Judge Sharif Uddin Chaklader abstained from work following a call of the Jatiyatabadi Ainjibi Forum.

In June 2017, 140 lawyers resigned from the Bangladesh Jatiyatabadi Ainjibi Forum in Narayanganj District after rejecting the district forum formed by Barrister Mahbub Uddin Khokon. Following the verdict of the Bangladesh Supreme Court on the 16th amendment case, Bangladesh Jatiyatabadi Ainjibi Forum held rallies in support of the verdict while Bangabandhu Awami Ainjibi Parishad held rallies against the verdict.

In 2018, Bangladesh Jatiyatabadi Ainjibi Forum demanded the cancelation of the election results of the Bangladesh Bar Council alleging irregularities and corruption. Which was denied by law secretary of governing Awami League SM Rezaul Karim. In October 2019, Bangladesh Nationalist Party expelled Bangladesh Jatiyatabadi Ainjibi Forum member Morsheda Khatun Shilpi for defending an accused in the Murder of Abrar Fahad.

Bangladesh Jatiyatabadi Ainjibi Forum demanded the release of former prime minister Khaleda Zia in January 2020.

In May 2023, lawyers of Bangladesh Jatiyatabadi Ainjibi Forum got in a fight with lawyers of Bangabandhu Awami Ainjibi Parishad. Secretary of the Bangladesh Supreme Court Bar Association Abdun Nur Dulal accused Bangladesh Jatiyatabadi Ainjibi Forum activists of vandalizing his office which the forum refuted by saying he vandalized his own office. Barrister Kaiser Kamal, secretary general of Bangladesh Jatiyatabadi Ainjibi Forum and legal affairs secretary of the Bangladesh Nationalist Party, filed a petition in October 2023 to ban the screening of Mujib: The Making of a Nation for alleged inaccurate portrayal of President Ziaur Rahman. In November, the Bangladesh Jatiyatabadi Ainjibi Forum claimed 20 thousand opposition activists were detained before the general election. Bangladesh Jatiyatabadi Ainjibi Forum claimed the Bangladesh Supreme Court Bar Association election was rigged in favor of Awami League while pro-Awami League lawyers accused them of creating an unnecessary controversy.

In April 2024, AM Mahbub Uddin Khokon was removed from senior vice-president post of Bangladesh Jatiyatabadi Ainjibi Forum after he was elected president of Bangladesh Supreme Court Bar Association. He had taken leadership of the Bar association against the wishes of the forum leadership. President of Bangladesh Jatiyatabadi Ainjibi Forum and vice chairman of the Bangladesh Nationalist Party, Zainul Abedin, asked the government to consider banning Awami League and parities that were in an electoral alliance with it after expressing support for the ban on Bangladesh Chhatra league.
