= Salahuddin Ahmad =

Bangladeshi politician (1947 or 1948 – 2025)

- সালাউদ্দিন আহমদ

14th Attorney General for Bangladesh
- In office 20 July 2008 – 12 January 2009
- Appointed by: Iajuddin Ahmed
- President: Iajuddin Ahmed
- Preceded by: Fida M. Kamal
- Succeeded by: Mahbubey Alam

Personal details
- Born: 1947 or 1948
- Died: 21 September 2025 (aged 77) Dhaka, Bangladesh
- Education: University of London; Columbia Law School
- Occupation: Jurist

Salahuddin Ahmad (1947 or 1948 – 21 September 2025) was a Bangladeshi jurist, the Attorney General for Bangladesh from 13 July 2008 to 12 January 2009, and a prominent practicing lawyer of the Supreme Court of Bangladesh. Ahmad was appointed after Fida M. Kamal, the then attorney general, resigned from his office in the wake of a series of disagreements with the government over a number of issues.

== Life and career ==
After the Grand Alliance led by Awami League leader Sheikh Hasina formed a new government on 6 January 2009, Salahuddin Ahmad submitted his "resignation to the law minister in line with the tradition that the attorney general resigns after a new government takes over". Ahmad has been replaced by Mahbub-e Alam.

Ahmad completed his BSc in economics from London School of Economics in 1969; MA from University of London in 1970, and LL.M from Columbia Law School in 1984.

He taught economics at University of Dhaka in the 1970s. He was appointed as an assistant professor at the Department of Economics, University of Dhaka as assistant professor and taught there for a number of years. Later, he also taught at IBA of DU and had worked for UNDP before switching to legal profession. He has been associated with Kamal Hossain & Associates.

Ahmad was appointed the director of the School of Law at the University of Asia Pacific for two years in the year 2018. He taught several modules in both the Bachelor of Laws and Master of Laws level.

Ahmad died on 21 September 2025, at the age of 77.
