= Faqueer Shahabuddin Ahmad =

Bangladeshi politician

- ফকির সাহাবউদ্দীন আহমদ

Attorney General of Bangladesh
- In office 18 December 1972 – 21 March 1976
- President: Abu Sayeed Chowdhury; Mohammad Mohammadullah; Sheikh Mujibur Rahman; Khondaker Mostaq Ahmad; Abu Sadat Mohammad Sayem
- Preceded by: M. H. Khandaker
- Succeeded by: Syed Ishtiaq Ahmed

Personal details
- Born: Aral village, Kapasia thana, Dacca district, British India
- Spouse: Ayesha Akhtar
- Children: 7
- Education: Dacca University

Faqueer Shahabuddin Ahmad was a Bangladeshi lawyer and politician. He was a drafter of the Constitution of Bangladesh and was the Attorney General of Bangladesh from 1972 to 1976.

== Biography ==
Ahmad was born in 1927 in Aral village of Kapasia thana, Dacca district, British India (now Kapasia Upazila, Gazipur District, Bangladesh). His father, Faqueer Gyasuddin, was a politician and social worker. Ahmad was educated in Dacca. He matriculated from St. Gregory's High School in 1943, and completed his intermediate at Jagannath College. He earned a bachelor's degree, master's degree, and Bachelor of Laws at Dacca University in 1950, 1951, and 1955, respectively.

Ahmad was enrolled as an advocate of the Dacca High Court in 1955 and of the Supreme Court of Pakistan in 1965. In September 1970, the Awami League nominated him for the Dacca-XX seat in the Provincial Assembly of East Pakistan.

During the Bangladesh Liberation War, the government in exile sent him to Sri Lanka as a diplomatic envoy. Bangladesh won its independence from Pakistan in December 1971. In April 1972, the Constituent Assembly of Bangladesh formed a 34-member committee to draft a constitution. Ahmad was one of nine lawyers appointed to the committee. In December 1972, he succeeded M. H. Khandaker as Attorney General of Bangladesh. He served in that post until March 1976.

Ahmad was married to Ayesha Akhtar. They had seven children. Their daughter Marina Ahmad teaches music and resides in New York City, Mumbai, and Dhaka.
