= M. H. Khandaker =

Attorney General of Bangladesh

1st Attorney General of Bangladesh
- In office 21 January 1972 – 17 December 1972
- Appointed by: Abu Sayeed Chowdhury
- President: Abu Sayeed Chowdhury
- Preceded by: Position established
- Succeeded by: Faqueer Shahabuddin Ahmad

Personal details
- Children: A. J. Mohammad Ali

M. H. Khandaker was the first attorney general of Bangladesh.

== Career ==
Former chief adviser Latifur Rahman was Khandaker's apprentice when he was the attorney general of Bangladesh.

== Personal life ==
Khandaker's son, A. J. Mohammad Ali, was appointed the 12th attorney general of Bangladesh.
