= Mahmudul Islam =

Bangladeshi politician

- মাহমুদুল ইসলাম

10th Attorney General of Bangladesh
- In office 16 July 1998 – 9 October 2001
- Appointed by: Shahabuddin Ahmed
- President: Shahabuddin Ahmed
- Preceded by: K. S. Nabi
- Succeeded by: A. F. Hassan Ariff

Personal details
- Born: 24 July 1936 Rangpur, Bengal Presidency, British India
- Died: 16 February 2016 (aged 79) Dhaka, Bangladesh
- Spouse: Tahmina Islam (m. 1966)
- Education: MA (political science); LLM; University of Dhaka; Indiana University

Mahmudul Islam (24 July 1936 – 16 February 2016) was a senior lawyer of Supreme Court of Bangladesh. He served as the 10th Attorney General of Bangladesh.

== Early life and education ==
Islam was born in Rangpur in 1936 to Azizul Islam, a lawyer and Jahanara Islam. Mahmudul passed his HSC examination from Carmichael College. He completed his bachelor's and master's in political science in 1957 and LLB degree in 1959 from the University of Dhaka. He later received his Master of Laws (LLM) degree from Indiana University in 1980.

== Career ==
Islam started his career at Rangpur Bar in 1961, and later got enlisted at the High Court in 1967. He worked as a junior with lawyer Birendra Nath Chowdhury and then with Syed Ishtiaq Ahmed. He was enrolled as an advocate of the appellate division of the Supreme Court of Bangladesh in 1972. He served as an assistant Attorney General from 1972 until 1976. He served as the Attorney General from 1998 to 2001.

Islam wrote books titled Constitutional Law of Bangladesh, Law of Civil Procedure and Interpretation of Statutes and Document.

== Personal life ==
Islam had two sons – Asif Islam and Arif Islam.
