= Siddique Ahmed Chowdhury =

Bangladeshi judge

Justice of the High Court Division of Bangladesh

Personal details
- Profession: Judge

Siddique Ahmed Chowdhury is a retired judge of the High Court Division of the Bangladesh Supreme Court.

== Career ==
From 1964 to 1965, Chowdhury was the general secretary of the Bangladesh Supreme Court Bar Association (then East Pakistan High Court Bar Association).

Chowdhury was removed from the High Court Division on 3 March 1979 when President Ziaur Rahman reduced the retirement age from 65 to 62.
