= Pavel Rahman =

Pavel Rahman is a Bangladeshi photographer and Ekushey Padak award recipient.

== Early life ==
Rahman was born on 26 April 1956 in Rangpur, East Pakistan, Pakistan.

== Career ==
Rahman joined the weekly Akota in 1973 as a photographer. From 1976 to 1980, he worked as a photographer in The Sangbad. From 1980 to 1993 he worked at The New Nation. In 1983, he took an iconic photograph of the back of Noor Hossain, which read "Gonotontra mukti pak" ("Let democracy be freed"), during protests against military dictator Hussain Mohammad Ershad.

In 1993, he joined the Banglabazar Patrika as the Photo Editor. He joined the Janakantha in 1994 and worked their till 1997. He joined the Associated Press as a photographer and is the photography adviser of the daily Prothom Alo. In 2008, he won the Pictures of the Year International award, one of seven winners from the Associated Press.

Rahman held a three-day solo exhibition on Sheikh Mujibur Rahman at Rangpur Zilla School in March 2019. In 2021, he was awarded the Ekushey Padak for photography.
