= Aleem al-Razee =

Bangladeshi lawyer and politician

Abdul Aleem al-Razee was a Bangladeshi lawyer and politician.

== Early life ==
al-Razee was born in 1925 in Karatia in Nagarpur Upazila, Tangail District, East Bengal, British India. He completed a M.A. and LL.B from University of Calcutta. He earned PhD from the University of London.

== Career ==
From 1949 to 1953, al-Razee was the chairman of the Muslim Welfare Association, London. He worked as the editor of The Oriental Times based in London. In 1953, he returned from London and joined the Dhaka High Court as an advocate. In 1965, he was elected to the National Assembly of Pakistan from Mymensingh-1 as an independent candidate.

In 1957, al-Razee founded City Law College, Dhaka and in 1968 he founded Nagarpur Degree College. He founded Lauhati Alim al-Razi Girls' High School in his village. From 1957 to 1972 he served as the President of City Law College, Dhaka. After the Independence of Bangladesh, he joined the National Awami Party (Bhashani) but left the party in 1974. From 1974 to 1975 he served as the president of the Bangladesh Supreme Court Bar Association.

After that he taught law at the University of Dhaka. In 1976, he founded Bangladesh People's League. He edited the weekly Durbin, published from Tangail. He published a book called Musalmaner Jene Rakha Bhalo. He wrote a fictional book called On Trekking through to Arakan.

== Death ==
al-Razee died on 16 March 1985 in Dhaka, Bangladesh. His book, The Constitutional Glimpses of Martial Law in India, Pakistan and Bangladesh, was published posthumously by University Press Limited. Dr. Aleem-Al-Razee Memorial Council organizes events on the anniversary of his death.
