= Daily Brahmanbaria =

Bangladeshi daily newspaper

The Daily Brahmanbaria (Bengali: দৈনিক ব্রাহ্মণবাড়িয়া) is a Bengali-language daily newspaper that serves Brahmanbaria District in Bangladesh. The newspaper was founded in 1991. The editor is Md. Nurul Hossain, who has more than forty years of experience as an editor. The newspaper is also published as an online publication. It was first published in tabloid sized. It changed to a broad sized newspaper, published in black and white.

== See also ==
- List of newspapers in Bangladesh
- Bengali-language newspapers
- The Daily Karatoa
- Sylheter Dak
