= Khandaker Mahbub Hossain =

Bangladeshi lawyer and politician (1938–2022)

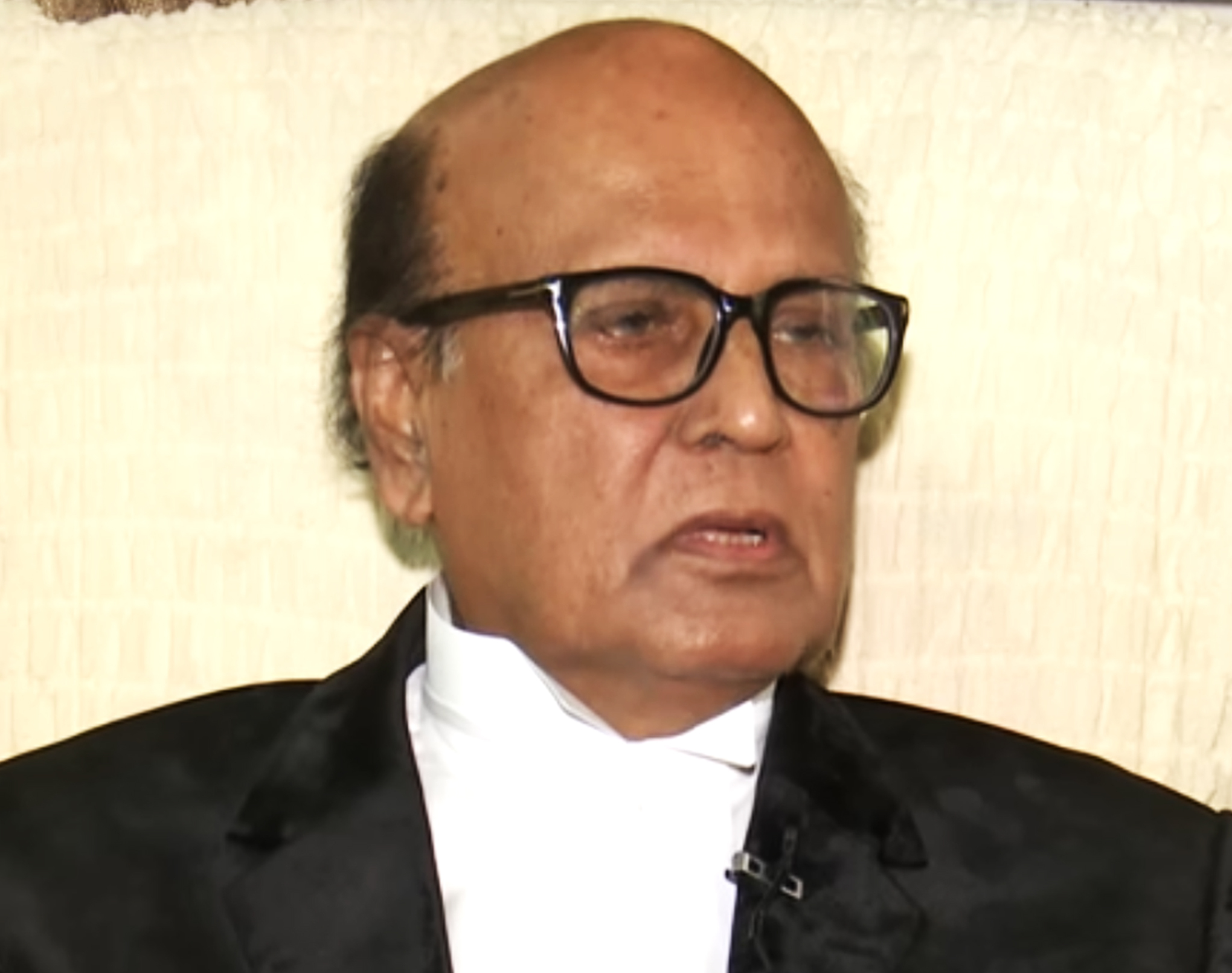

Vice Chairman, Bangladesh Nationalist Party
- In office 6 August 2016 – 2022

Bangladesh Supreme Court Bar Association
- In office 2006–2007

Personal details
- Born: 20 March 1938 Bamna, Backergunge District, Bengal
- Died: 31 December 2022 (aged 84) Dhaka, Bangladesh
- Relatives: Tofazzal Hossain Manik Miah (brother-in-law); Mainul Hosein (nephew); Anwar Hossain Manju (nephew)
- Occupation: Lawyer, politician
- Known for: Criminal law expert

Advocate Khandaker Mahbub Hossain (20 March 1938 – 31 December 2022) was a Bangladeshi lawyer and politician. In 1973, he was the chief prosecutor of the court set up to try war criminals under 'Dalal' Act. He served as Bangladesh Supreme Court Bar Association President and Supreme Court Bar Council Vice Chairman. He was known as a criminal law expert in Bangladesh.

== Early life and education ==
Hossain was born on 20 March 1938 to a Bengali family of Muslim Khandakers in Bamna, then part of the Backergunge District of Bengal. He was the son of Khandaker Abul Hasan, who had moved to Bamna from Faridpur after marrying the daughter of Khondkar Ismail. Hossain's maternal great grandfather, Khondkar Munshi Samiruddin, had arrived to Bamna to serve as a naib (deputy) for Taluqdar Hosenuddin Chowdhury of Bamna. Hossain's brother is journalist Shahadat Hossain and his brother-in-law was Tofazzal Hossain Manik Miah.

Hossain received his higher secondary education in Narayanganj. After passing matriculation exams, he studied at Notre Dame College in Dhaka and then at University of Dhaka law department.

== Career ==
Hossain was arrested during the 1952 Bengali Language Movement from Narayanganj. He was also arrested for protesting against military dictator Ayub Khan.

As a lawyer, Hossain was listed on 31 January 1967. On 20 October of that year, he was enrolled as a High Court Lawyer. In the legal profession, he handled the cases of all the first rank politicians of Bangladesh. Under the 1973 'Dalal' Act, he was the chief prosecutor of the court set up for war criminals.

Hossain served four times as Supreme Court Bar Association President and once as Supreme Court Bar Council Vice Chairman. He actively entered politics in 2008 with the Bangladesh Nationalist Party. He was the Vice-Chairman of Bangladesh Bar Council.

On 5 January 2014, a case was filed against Hossain at Dhaka's Ramna police station for obstructing police for performing their duty. He was arrested in front of the National Press Club in Dhaka on 7 January. He was released on bail by the Bangladesh High Court on 23 January of the same year.

From 2009 to 2016, he was appointed an advisor to the BNP Chairperson Khaleda Zia and in 2016 as the Vice Chairman of the Central Executive Committee of the BNP.

In August 2015, Hossain called the murder of secular activist Niladri Chattopadhyay Niloy a conspiracy by the government. He claimed the government was using the murder to claim seek support internationally for the government by portraying that it was locked in a struggle against Islamic terrorism.

In 2018, Hossain contested the 11th Bangladeshi general election as a candidate of the Bangladesh Nationalist Party from Barguna-2 . He received 9,518 votes but lost to Showkat Hasanur Rahman Rimon who received 2,00,325 votes.

== Death ==
Hossain died on 31 December 2022 at around 10:45 PM while undergoing treatment at Evercare Hospital in Dhaka from COVID-19 and pneumonia.
