= Sylheter Dak =

Bangladeshi daily newspaper

Sylheter Dak সিলেটের ডাক
- Type: Daily newspaper
- Format: Broadsheet
- Owner: Ragib Ali
- Founder: Ragib Ali
- Publisher: Abdul Hayee
- Political alignment: Liberal
- Language: Bengali
- Headquarters: Bandar Bazar, Sylhet, Bangladesh
- Website: sylheterdak.com.bd

The Daily Sylheter Dak (Bengali: সিলেটের ডাক) popularly known as the Sylheter Dak, is a local daily newspaper in Bangladesh, published from Sylhet in the Bengali language. The Sylheter Dak was founded on 18 July 1984. The newspaper, more than 30 years old, is the most widely circulated daily newspaper in Sylhet.

== Publication ==
The head office of the Sylheter Dak is located in Modhubon Supermarket, Bandar, Sylhet. Despite being the most widely circulated and popular among the local daily newspapers of Sylhet, the Sylheter Dak, published from Sylhet, was ordered to stop its publication in 2017, following the High Court's rule, when the owner was convicted. This order took place against the newspaper in accordance with the section 20 of the Printing, Press and Publication Act 1973. That order was postponed later.

The Weekly Sylheter Dak, a London-based weekly, was first published on 29 September 1996 by Bangladesh Media (UK) Ltd.

== See also ==
- List of newspapers in Bangladesh
- Bengali-language newspapers
- The Daily Karatoa
- Daily Brahmanbaria
- Daily Jalalabad
