= Mohiuddin Maharaj =

Bangladesh politician

- মহিউদ্দীন মহারাজ

Member of the Bangladesh Parliament for Pirojpur-2
- In office 30 January 2024 – 6 August 2024
- Preceded by: Anwar Hossain Manju

Personal details
- Born: 10 February 1976 (age 50)
- Party: Awami League
- Spouse: Umme Kulsum
- Occupation: Politician, businessperson

Mohiuddin Maharaj (born 10 February 1976) is a Bangladesh Awami League politician and a former Jatiya Sangsad member representing the Pirojpur-2 constituency. Maharaj, currently serving as the district Awami League Joint General Secretary. He is a former Zilla Parishad chairman of Pirojpur.

== Political life ==
Maharaj was elected Member of Parliament as an independent candidate in the 2024 twelfth National Parliament election with the eagle symbol. Before this he was the Chairman of Pirojpur District Council. He previously served as the assistant personal secretary (APS) of former minister, Anwar Hossain Manju.
