= Indira Road =

Street in Dhaka

Coordinates: 23.7583246°N 90.3845259°E

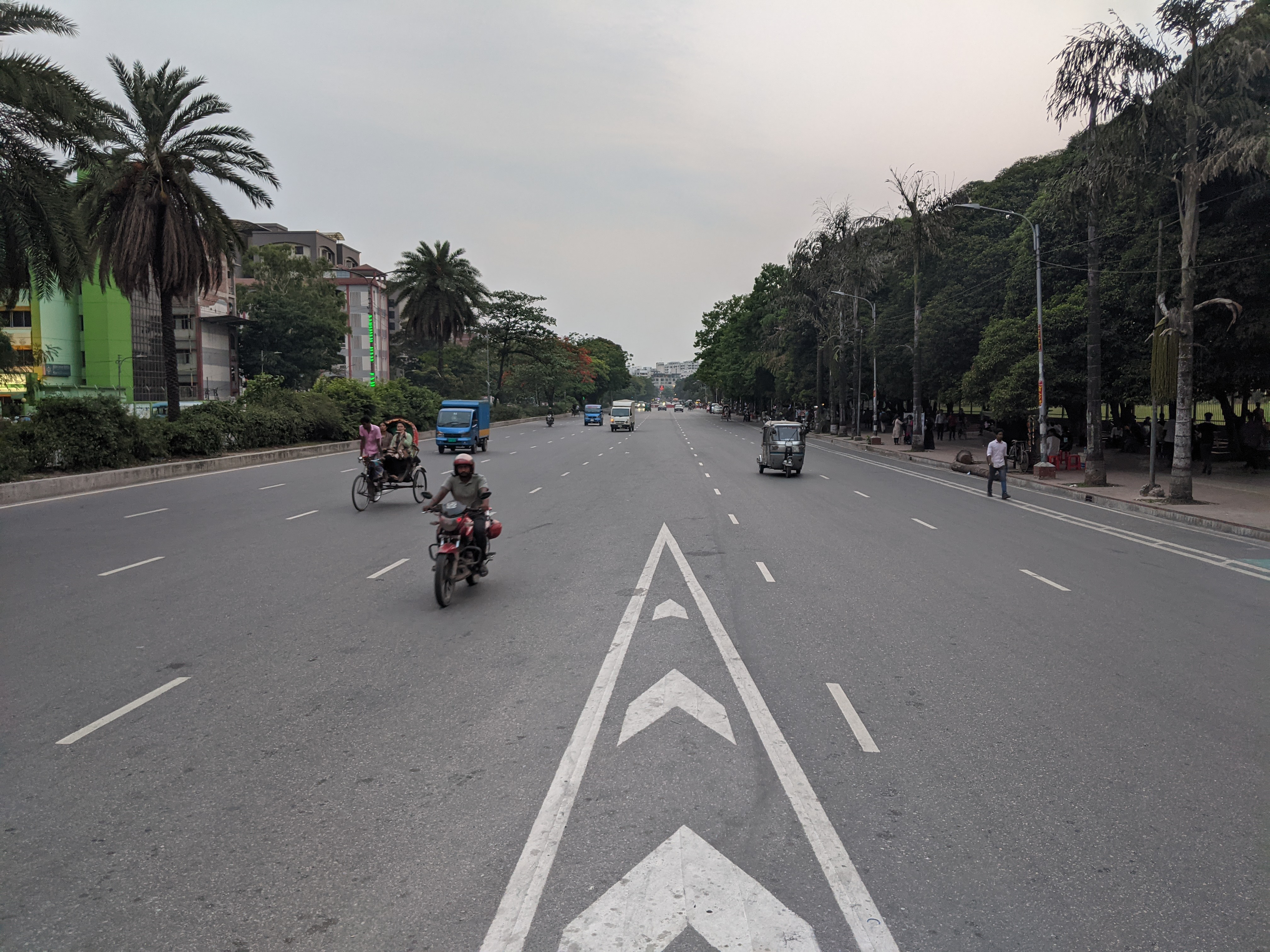
- Interactive map of Indira Road
- Namesake: Indira, Eldest daughter of Dwijdas Babu, a Rich person of this area
- Type: Street
- Maintained by: Dhaka North City Corporation
- Length: 1 km (0.62 mi)
- Location: Farmgate, Dhaka Bangladesh
- Postal code: 1207
- Nearest Dhaka Metro station: Farmgate metro station
- East end: Framgate
- West end: Bangabandhu Square

Indira Road is a road adjoining the Farmgate area of Dhaka city.

There is no evidence that it is named after Indira Gandhi. There is another theory about the naming of the road. In that area a wealthy person named Dwijdas Babu lived who was head of Manipur firm. His eldest daughter named Indira died. Her body was buried inside their own house. People think that the road was named after his daughter.

The road is under Dhaka North City Corporation and Tejgaon Thana. Tejgaon College is situated in the road. The government's Indira Road-Panthapath link road project is underway.
