= The New Nation (Bangladesh) =

Bangladeshi daily newspaper

- 9 November 2026 cover of The New Nation
- Type: Daily newspaper
- Format: Broadsheet
- Founder: Mainul Hosein
- Editor: Mokarram Hossain
- Founded: October 15, 1981; 45 years ago
- Language: English
- Headquarters: 1 R.K. Mission Road, Dhaka-1203
- Website: dailynewnation.com

The New Nation is a Bangladeshi English-language daily newspaper published from Dhaka, Bangladesh. Founded by ex Parliament member Mainul Hosein in 1981. The daily gained widespread recognition in November 1987 by publishing photojournalist Pavel Rahman's iconic photograph of pro-democracy activist Nur Hossain. It is one of the oldest English daily newspapers in the country. Md. Mokarram Hossain is the editor of the newspaper.

== History ==
Founded by former Member of Parliament Mainul Hosein, the publication began as a weekly in 1978 and was later launched as a daily newspaper on October 15, 1981. The newspaper is edited by Md. Mokarram Hossain.

The newspaper is published from the historic New Nation Press, which also played a notable role in Bangladesh's media history. During the 1987 anti-autocracy movement, photojournalist Pavel Rahman captured the iconic image of activist Nur Hossain with political slogans painted on his back. The publication of this photograph in The New Nation brought national attention to the movement and established the daily's role in Bangladesh's press history.
