= Shah Alam (Bangladeshi politician, born 1951) =

Bangladeshi politician

Member of Bangladesh Parliament

Personal details
- Born: 30 May 1951 (age 74)
- Political party: Bangladesh Awami League

Shah Alam is a Bangladesh Awami League politician and a former member of parliament for Pirojpur-2.

== Career ==
Alam was elected to parliament from Pirojpur-2 as a Bangladesh Awami League candidate in 2008.
