= AM Amin Uddin =

16th Attorney General for Bangladesh

A. M. Amin Uddin
- এ. এম. আমিন উদ্দিন
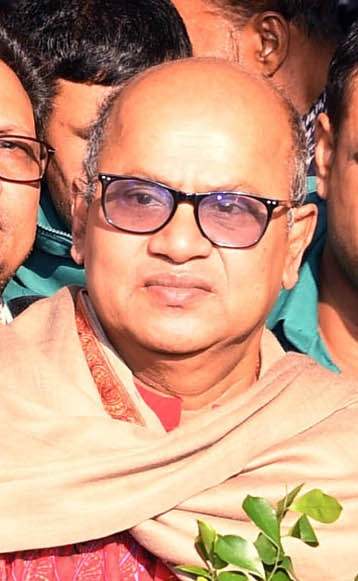
- Amin in 2023

16th Attorney General for Bangladesh
- In office 11 October 2020 – 7 August 2024
- President: Mohammad Abdul Hamid; Mohammed Shahabuddin
- Prime Minister: Sheikh Hasina; Muhammad Yunus (Chief adviser)
- Preceded by: Mahbubey Alam
- Succeeded by: Md Asaduzzaman

Personal details
- Born: 29 September 1962 (age 64) Moulvibazar, East Pakistan, Pakistan
- Education: Dhaka City College; Dhaka College; Central Law College

Abu Mohammad Amin Uddin (known as A. M. Amin Uddin; born 29 September 1962) is a Bangladeshi lawyer who served as the 16th attorney general for Bangladesh. He is former president of the Bangladesh Supreme Court Bar Association Executive Committee for the terms 2019–2020 and 2020–2021.

== Early life ==
Uddin was born in Kulaura Upazila, Moulvibazar District in the then East Pakistan. He completed his HSC from Dhaka City College and bachelor's from Dhaka University. He earned his LLB degree from Central Law College in 1982.

== Career ==
Uddin started practicing as a lawyer on 26 October 1987. He was later enrolled in the High Court Division on 28 October 1989 and in the Appellate Division in 2003, both of the Supreme Court of Bangladesh.

Uddin has served as an assistant attorney general from 1996 to 2000. He was the deputy attorney general from 2000 to 2001.

Uddin served as the secretary of the Bangladesh Supreme Court Bar Association Executive Committee 2006 - 2007. In 2008, as secretary of the Bangladesh Supreme Court Bar Association opposed proposals to appoint 50 percent of High Court Division judges from members of the Bangladesh Judicial Service Association.

In October 2020, Uddin was appointed Attorney General of Bangladesh following the death of Mahbubey Alam, the longest serving Attorney General of Bangladesh. Following his appointment, Murad Reza and Md. Momtazuddin Fakir, additional attorneys general, resigned from their posts.

In May 2021, Uddin was re-elected President of Bangladesh Supreme Court Bar Association through an oral vote presided by Muhammad Shafique Ullah. This was protested by lawyers associated with the Bangladesh Nationalist Party who called it against the charter of the association, as an election was not held. The 2023 Bangladesh Supreme Court Bar Association elections were chaotic with heavy police presence and fighting between lawyers. Uddin tried to stop the fighting during the vote which saw lawyers aligned with the ruling Awami League take all seats of the association including the post of President by Md Momtaz Uddin Fakir. Supporters of the Bangladesh Nationalist Party, the opposition party, called for new elections.

On 7 August 2024, Uddin resigned the attorney generalship following the fall of the Sheikh Hasina led Awami League government. The new government saw the removal of 68 law officers including Uddin. He was charged in a murder case in the death of a protester against the government on 19 July 2024 along with Prime Minister Sheikh Hasina and other senior members of the government.
