= Mainul Hosein =

Bangladeshi politician (1940–2023)

- মইনুল হোসেন

Law, Information and Land Advisor
- In office 14 January 2007 – 8 January 2008
- Prime Minister: Fakhruddin Ahmed
- Preceded by: Md. Fazlul Haque
- Succeeded by: A F Hasan Arif

Member of Parliament
- In office March 1973 – May 1975
- Preceded by: Position established
- Constituency: Bhandaria

Personal details
- Born: 31 January 1940 Bhandaria, Backergunge District, Bengal
- Died: 9 December 2023 (aged 83) Dhaka, Bangladesh
- Party: Bangladesh Awami League (1973-1975); Democratic League (1976)
- Parent: Tofazzal Hossain Manik Miah (father)
- Relatives: Anwar Hossain Manju (brother); Khandaker Mahbub Hossain (uncle)
- Education: University of Dhaka; Middle Temple
- Occupation: Lawyer, printer and publisher of The New Nation

Mainul Hosein (31 January 1940 – 9 December 2023) was a Bangladeshi lawyer and the publisher of the daily newspaper The New Nation. He was chairman of the editorial board of The Daily Ittefaq, whose building was shelled and completely demolished on 25 March 1971 by the Pakistan Army. He served as the law, information and land adviser to the immediate past interim Government of Bangladesh during January 2007 – January 2008.

== Background and education ==
Hosein was born on 31 January 1940 to a Sunni Bengali family in the village of Bhandaria, then part of the Backergunge District of Bengal. He is the son of Tofazzal Hossain Manik Miah, founding editor of The Daily Ittefaq, and brother of former government minister Anwar Hossain Manju. Hosein's paternal grandfather, Moslehuddin Miah, was originally from Faridpur. His mother was the daughter of Khandaker Abul Hasan Faridpuri of Bamna. Hosein's maternal ancestor, Khondkar Munshi Samiruddin, was the naib (deputy) of Taluqdar Hosenuddin Chowdhury, the second Zamindar of Bamna. His maternal uncles are lawyer Khandaker Mahbub Hossain and journalist Khandaker Shahadat Hossain. His son, Javed Husein, is married to the daughter of Anisul Islam Mahmud.

Hosein earned his bachelor's in political science from the University of Dhaka in 1961. He joined Middle Temple to study law. He was called to the Bar in 1965 and became a Barrister-at-Law.

== Career ==
Hosein was elected to the parliament in 1973 from Pirojpur constituency as a member of Bangladesh Awami League headed by Sheikh Mujibur Rahman, who eventually became the prime minister. Hosein however, resigned from the parliament along with M. A. G. Osmani, Commander-in-chief of Bangladesh Forces during the 1971 Bangladesh War of Independence, in May 1975 after the then President Rahman instituted one-party system of government through the Fourth Amendment to the constitution.

Hosein joined the Democratic League party, led by Khondaker Moshtaq Ahmad in 1976 well after Khondaker Mostaq Ahmad was ousted from power on 6 November 1975. Hosein along with other members of the Democratic League were subsequently jailed for three months by Major General Ziaur Rahman after trying to form an opposition platform to challenge BNP in the upcoming polls.

Hosein served as the president of Bangladesh Sangbadpatra Parishad, an association of newspaper owners. He was elected the president of Bangladesh Supreme Court Bar Association for the term 2000–2001.

Hosein joined the caretaker government as the law, information and land adviser on 14 January 2007. During his tenure, Bangladesh formally declared the separation of the government's executive and judicial functions on 1 November 2007.

== Controversy ==
In October 2018, Hosein was arrested as part of a political drive against the dissident publisher in a defamation case filed by a third party with a Rangpur court. Earlier, Masuda Bhatti, acting editor of Dainik Amader Notun Somoy, filed charges against Hosein for hurling abusive words at her and termed her "characterless" at the live talk show, Ekattor Journal, on government-backed Ekattor TV. Hosein got bail in the case filed by Bhatti but later, after his bail petition on cases filed by unrelated parties, a Dhaka Court sent Hosein to jail.

=== The Daily Ittefaq ===
After the death of Tofazzal Hossain Manik Miah on 1 June 1969, the two sons, Mainul Hosein and Anwar Hossain Manju took charge of the management of The Daily Ittefaq. The Bangladesh government banned all the newspapers except the government-run newspapers, the Bangladesh Observer and the Dainik Bangla, via the News Paper Cancellation Act on 16 June 1975. It also took over the publication of The Daily Ittefaq and the Bangladesh Times. Following the assassination of Sheikh Mujib and members of his family in a bloody and brutal coup conducted by few junior active and former military officers, all private newspapers including The Daily Ittefaq were returned to their owners on 24 August 1975.

In May 2010, an agreement was signed between the two brothers, which gave ownership of Ittefaq's title and goodwill to Manju and his sisters, and Hosein was given the ownership of the building on 1 RK Mission Road. After a High Court ruling in July 2010, Manju became the publisher, printer, and editor of the paper.

== Death ==
Hosein died of cancer in Dhaka, on 9 December 2023, at the age of 83.
