= Mahbubey Alam =

Bangladeshi lawyer (1949–2020)

- মাহবুবে আলম
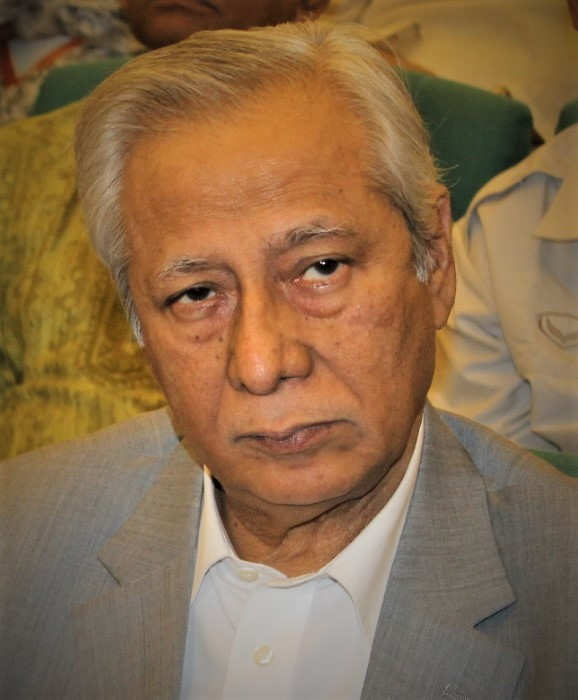
- Alam in 2017

15th Attorney General for Bangladesh
- In office 13 January 2009 – 27 September 2020
- President: Iajuddin Ahmed; Zillur Rahman; Mohammad Abdul Hamid
- Prime Minister: Sheikh Hasina; Fakhruddin Ahmed; (acting)
- Preceded by: Salahuddin Ahmad
- Succeeded by: AM Amin Uddin

Personal details
- Born: 17 February 1949 Munshiganj, East Bengal, Dominion of Pakistan
- Died: 27 September 2020 (aged 71) Dhaka, Bangladesh
- Cause of death: COVID-19
- Education: University of Dhaka

Mahbubey Alam (17 February 1949 – 27 September 2020) was a Bangladeshi politician, designated senior counsel, and Attorney General for Bangladesh. He was appointed attorney general on 13 January 2009. He was a senior advocate at the Supreme Court of Bangladesh. He had served earlier as additional attorney general from 15 November 1998 to 4 October 2001.

== Biography ==
Alam was born in Mouchhamandra village in Louhajang in Munshiganj(Bikrampur) on 17 February 1949. He studied at University of Dhaka, obtaining his Bachelor of Arts in Political Science (1968), Master of Arts in Public Administration (1969), and LL.B degree (1972). He also attained diplomas in constitutional law and parliamentary institutions and procedures in 1979 from the Institute of Constitutional and Parliamentary Studies (ICPS) in New Delhi.

He began his law career at the High Court Division of the Supreme Court of Bangladesh in January 1975 and became a lawyer of the Bangladesh Supreme Court, Appellate Division in 1980. He was the Chairman of the Bangladesh Bar Council from 13 January 2009 to 30 June 2018. He was Additional Attorney General for Bangladesh from 15 November 1998 to 4 October 2001. He was Attorney General of Bangladesh from 13 January 2009 until his death in 2020.

== Death ==
Mahbubey Alam was admitted to Combined Military Hospital on 4 September 2020 after being diagnosed with COVID-19 during the COVID-19 pandemic in Bangladesh and died on 27 September. A Namaz-e-Janaza was held at the Supreme Court on 28 September 2020, and Alam was buried at Mirpur Martyred Intellectual Graveyard.
