= Monjurul Ahsan Bulbul =

Manjurul Ahsan Bulbul
- Born: November 30, 1959 (age 66); Mymensingh District, East Pakistan, Pakistan (now Sherpur District, Bangladesh)
- Occupation: Journalist
- Years active: 1987–present

Manjurul Ahsan Bulbul (born 30 November 1959) is a Bangladeshi journalist and former president of a faction of the Bangladesh Federal Union of Journalists. In recognition of his contributions to journalism, the Bangla Academy awarded him an honorary Bangla Academy Fellowship in 2020.

Bulbul is former chief executive officer and chief editor of Ekushey Television. Throughout his career, he has worked with several television channels, including ATN Bangla and Boishakhi TV. He was the editor-in-chief of TV Today. He is the former chairman of Association for Social Advancement.

== Early life ==
Bulbul was born on 30 November 1959, in Nalitabari, Sherpur District, then part of East Pakistan (now Bangladesh). His father was Amzad Hossain Talukder, and his mother was Begum Rowshan Ara.

== Career ==
Bulbul was the executive editor of the daily Sangbad in 2006. He was the Chief of News of ATN Bangla in 2007. He served in a committee to monitor the textbook distribution by National Curriculum and Textbook Board.

Bulbul was the editor-in-chief of ATN News. He was a chief editor of Boishakhi Television. In 2015, he said a culture of impunity was threatening the press in Bangladesh. He received a death threat from Ansarullah Bangla Team, an Al Qaeda affiliate.

In 2016, following the death of then-president Altaf Mahmud, Bulbul was elected president of the pro-Awami League faction of the Bangladesh Federal Union of Journalists through a by-election. Prior to that, he had already served two consecutive terms as president. He called for the 9th Wage Board to be implemented for journalists. He served in the Bangladesh Press Council in 2015 and 2017.

Bulbul was a member of the jury board for the National Film Awards 2022. He served as an election commissioner for the Economic Reporters' Forum election. He was critical of the Digital Security Act, 2018 and called on the government to release everyone detained under the act.

Bulbul worked as the CEO of Ekushey Television. Bulbul was then appointed the editor-in-chief of ‘TV Today,’ a newly approved television channel. He was awarded by the National Board of Revenue for being one of the highest tax-paying journalists in Bangladesh. As chairman of the governing body of the Association for Social Advancement, he ordered the distribution of 550 billion BDT (4.5 billion USD) loans by the non-profit. In 2023, he was appointed an independent director of the Chittagong Stock Exchange.

Following the fall of the Sheikh Hasina-led Awami League government, Bulbul's press accreditation was revoked by the Muhammad Yunus led interim government along with 167 journalists. The Committee to Protect Journalists raised concerns for the revokations. The Bangladesh Financial Intelligence Unit ordered the freezing of his bank accounts along with those of nine other senior journalists, including the former president of the National Press Club.
