= Attorney General for Bangladesh =

Position in Bangladeshi government

- বাংলাদেশের অ্যাটর্নি জেনারেল
- Government Seal of Bangladesh

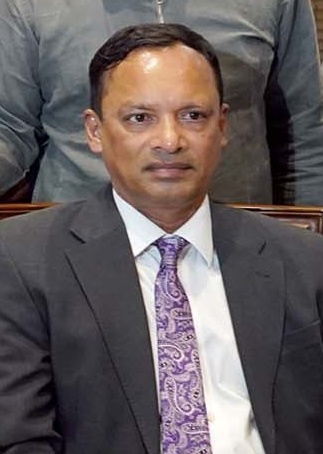
- Incumbent; Ruhul Quddus Kazal
- Office of the Attorney General
- Style: The Honourable (formal); Attorney General (informal)
- Type: Chief legal adviser
- Status: Senior advocate
- Abbreviation: AGB
- Member of: Bangladesh Bar Council
- Residence: Dhaka, Bangladesh
- Seat: Supreme Court of Bangladesh, Ramna, Dhaka
- Appointer: The president of Bangladesh
- Term length: Until the age of 67 or At the pleasure of the President
- Inaugural holder: M. H. Khandaker
- Formation: 21 January 1972; 54 years ago
- Deputy: Deputy Attorney General
- Website: attorneygeneral.gov.bd

The attorney general for Bangladesh (Bengali: অ্যাটর্নি জেনারেল) is the Bangladesh's State's chief legal adviser and its primary lawyer in the Supreme Court of Bangladesh. The attorney general is usually a highly respected senior advocate and is appointed by the ruling government. The attorney general is the ex-officio chairman of the Bangladesh Bar Council and accordingly he performs the duties assigned to that post and empowered to participate in any reference to the Supreme Court of Bangladesh made by the President under article 106 of the Constitution and can express his own opinion.

Unlike the attorney general of the United States, the attorney general of Bangladesh does not have any executive authority, and is not a political appointee; those functions are performed by the minister of justice. The attorney general is assisted by the several additional attorneys-general, deputy attorneys-general, and assistant attorneys-general.

== List of attorneys general ==
No.	Name	Took office	Left office	Tenure
1	M. H. Khandaker	21 January 1972	17 December 1972	331 days
2	Faqueer Shahabuddin Ahmad	18 December 1972	21 March 1976	3 years, 94 days
3	Syed Ishtiaq Ahmed	22 March 1976	6 May 1976	45 days
4	Khandaker Abu Bakr	10 May 1976	13 March 1985	8 years, 307 days
5	M. Nurullah	14 March 1985	6 April 1990	5 years, 23 days
6	Rafique Ul Huq	7 April 1990	17 December 1990	254 days
7	Aminul Haque	18 December 1990	13 July 1995	4 years, 207 days
8	M. Nurullah	26 July 1995	26 June 1996	336 days
9	K. S. Nabi	31 July 1996	30 May 1998	1 year, 303 days
10	Mahmudul Islam	16 July 1998	9 October 2001	3 years, 85 days
11	A. F. Hassan Ariff	14 October 2001	30 April 2005	3 years, 198 days
12	A. J. Mohammad Ali	30 April 2005	24 January 2007	1 year, 269 days
13	Fida M. Kamal	5 February 2007	16 July 2008	1 year, 162 days
14	Salahuddin Ahmad	20 July 2008	12 January 2009	176 days
15	Mahbubey Alam	13 January 2009	27 September 2020	11 years, 258 days
16	A. M. Amin Uddin	11 October 2020	7 August 2024	3 years, 301 days
17	Md Asaduzzaman	8 August 2024	28 December 2025	1 year, 142 days
—	Mohammad Arshadur Rouf (acting)	Jan 1 2026	March 25 2026	83 days
18	Barrister Ruhul Quddus Kazal	March 25 2026	Incumbent	

== See also ==
- Chief Justice of Bangladesh
- Justice ministry
- Politics of Bangladesh
