= Asia and Pacific Rim Peace Conference =

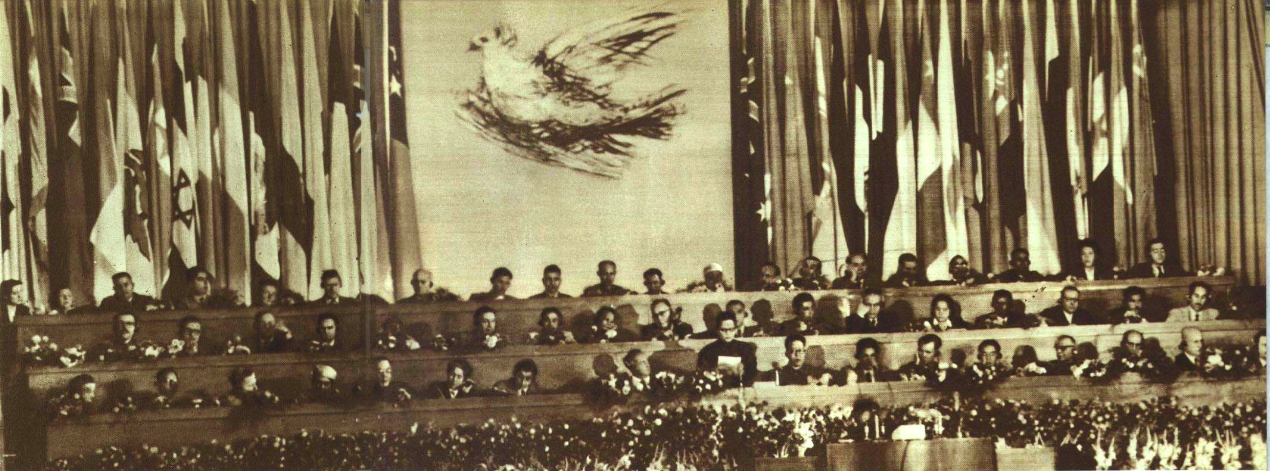
The Asia and Pacific Rim Peace Conference in Beijing on October 2, 1952

The Asia and Pacific Rim Peace Conference (also known as the Beijing Peace Conference) was held in Beijing, China, from October 2–12, 1952. Delegates from dozens of countries attended the conference, which including a number of speeches and opening remarks by Chinese communist leader Mao Zedong.

The gathering took place against the backdrop of the Korean War and the growing Cold War between the communist East and democratic West. It coincided with the heyday of positive Sino-Soviet relations. Delegates, mainly affiliated with domestic communist parties, traveled to Beijing from Canada, the United States, Guatemala, Colombia, Chile, Pakistan, India and Indonesia. Representatives from Australia attended the preliminary conference in Beijing in 1951, but proposed delegates for the 1952 conference had their passports revoked in an unprecedented Federal government intervention. Resolutions were passed, including a signed declaration by the Pakistani and Indian delegates supporting a negotiated settlement to any differences and the resolution of the Kashmir question "by the people of the Kashmir."
