= Bhandaria Upazila =

Bhandaria ভাণ্ডারিয়া
- Upazila
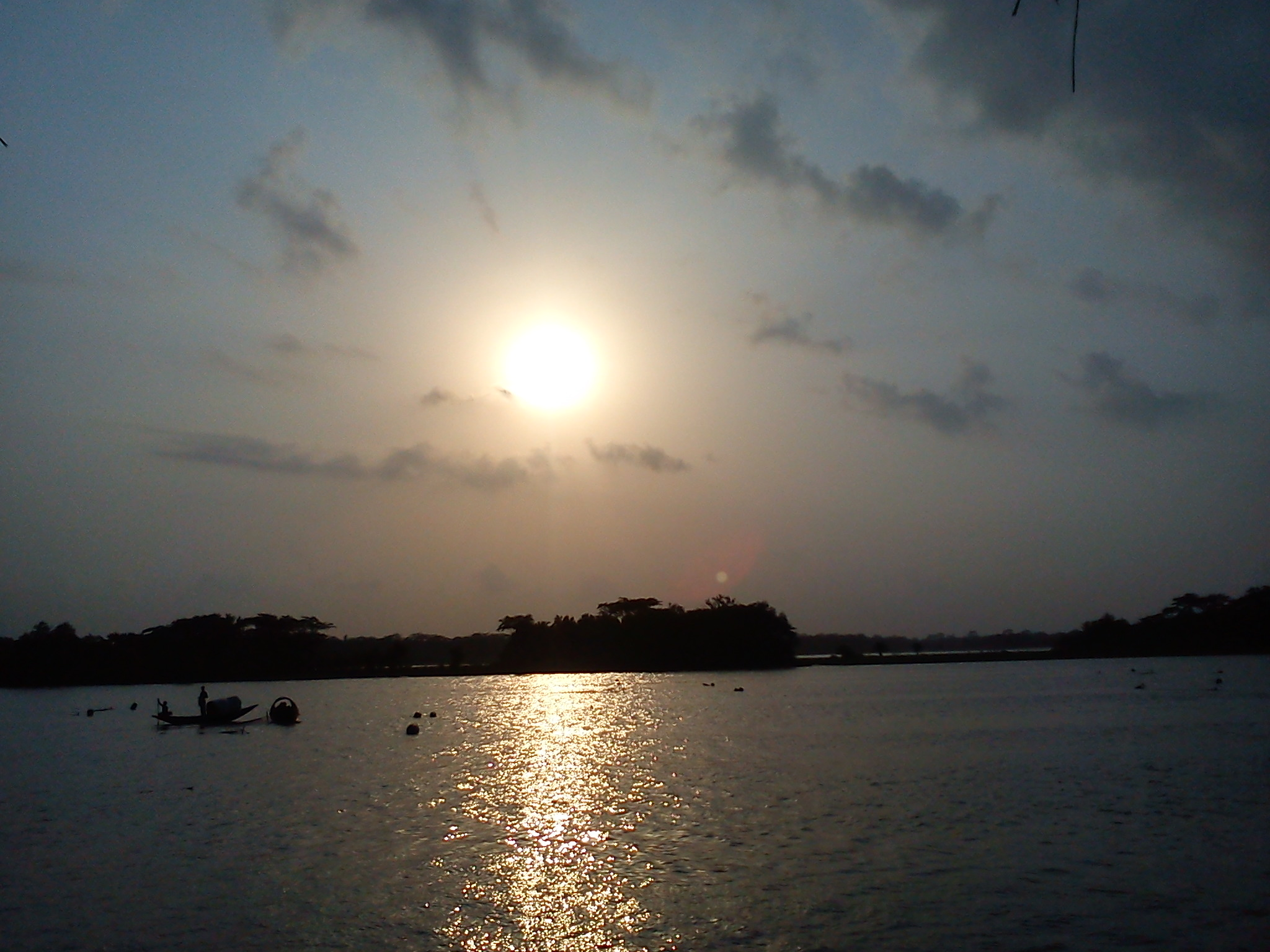
- Baleshwari River at Bhandaria

- Coordinates: 22°29.3′N 90°4.4′E
- Country: Bangladesh
- Division: Barisal Division
- District: Pirojpur District

Area
  - Total: 163.56 km^{2} (63.15 sq mi)

Population (2022)
  - Total: 163,654
  - Density: 1,000.6/km^{2} (2,591.5/sq mi)
- Time zone: UTC+6 (BST)
- Postal code: 8550
- Area code: 04623
- Website: Official Map of the Bhandaria Upazila

Bhandaria (Bengali: ভাণ্ডারিয়া) is an upazila of Pirojpur District in the Division of Barisal, Bangladesh.

== Geography ==
Bhandaria is located at 22.4889°N 90.0733°E. It has 27,969 households and a total area of 163.56 km^{2}.

== Demographics ==
Religions in Bhandaria Upazila (2022)
| Religion | Percent |
| Islam | 91.53% |
| Hinduism | 8.44% |
| Other or not stated | 0.01% |

Bhandaria Upazila mauza geocode map

According to the 2022 Bangladeshi census, Bhandaria Upazila had 41,365 households and a population of 163,654. 9.51% of the population were under 5 years of age. Bhandaria had a literacy rate (age 7 and over) of 84.51%: 85.01% for males and 84.04% for females, and a sex ratio of 95.36 males for every 100 females. 51,240 (31.31%) lived in urban areas.

According to the 2011 Census of Bangladesh, Bhandaria Upazila had 34,338 households and a population of 148,159. 34,318 (23.16%) were under 10 years of age. Bhandaria has a literacy rate (age 7 and over) of 67.7%, compared to the national average of 51.8%, and a sex ratio of 1050 females per 1000 males. 25,260 (17.05%) lived in urban areas.

According to the 1991 Bangladesh census, Bhandaria had a population of 145,233. Males constituted 50.34% of the population, and females 49.66%. The population aged 18 or over was 74,509. Bhandaria had an average literacy rate of 51.9% (7+ years), compared to the national average of 32.4%.

== Administration ==
UNO: Md. Easin Arafat Rana.

Bhandaria Upazila is divided into seven union parishads: Bhandaria, Bhitabaria, Dhaoa, Gouripur, Ikri, Nudmulla, and Telikhali. The union parishads are subdivided into 37 mauzas and 45 villages.

== Notable people ==
- Ayub Ali (1919–1995), Islamic scholar and educationist
- Aboul Bashar Khan (born 1960), American politician
