= Bangladesh Bar Council =

Regulating body of lawyers in Bangladesh

- Logo of Bangladesh Bar Council

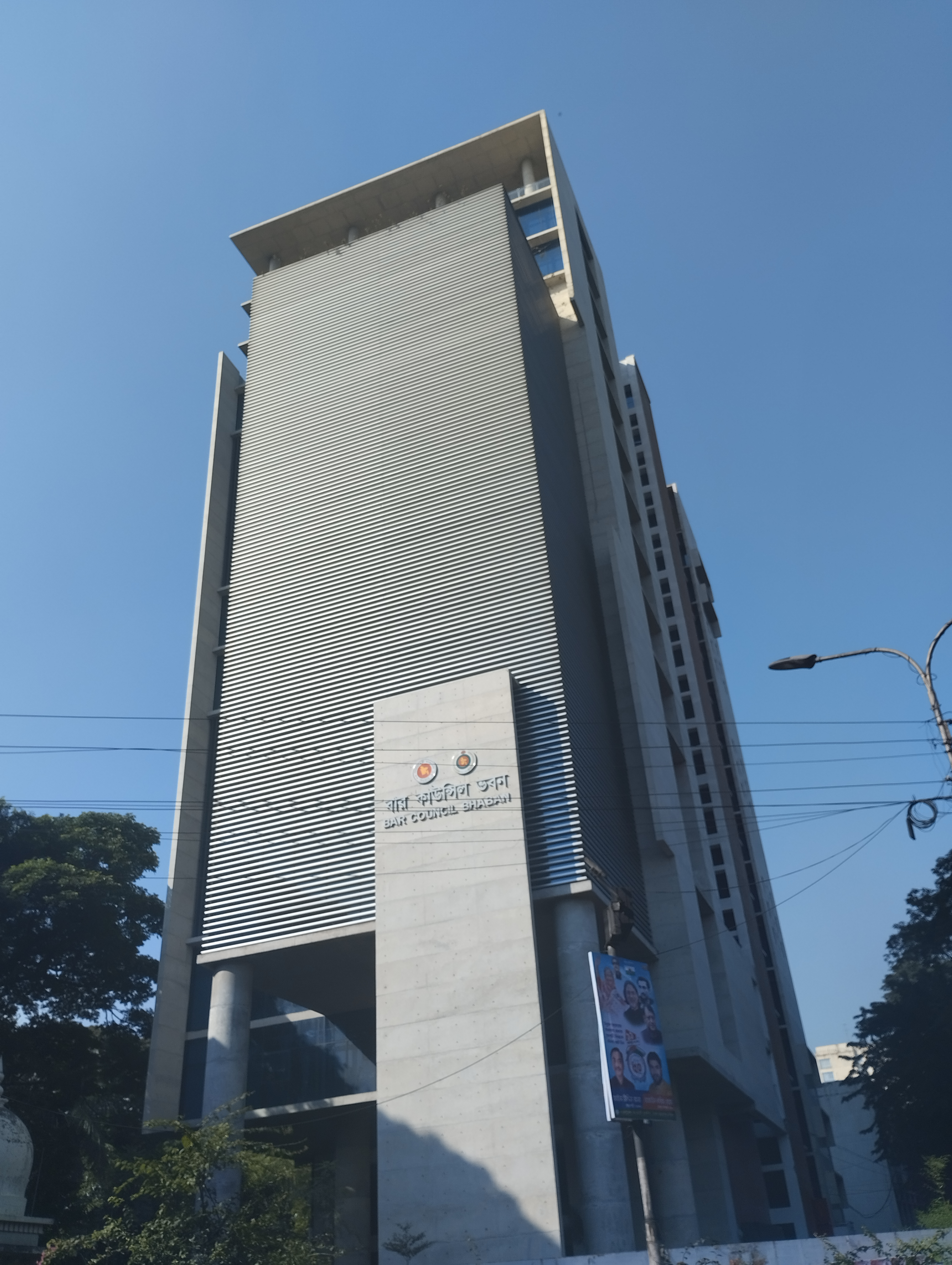
- Formation: 1972; 54 years ago
- Type: Statutory body Regulatory body
- Headquarters: Bar Council Bhaban, 3, Captain Mansur Ali Sarani, Dhaka 23°43′58.987″N 90°24′13.583″E
- Region served: Bangladesh
- Official language: Bangla and English
- Chairman: Md. Asaduzzaman
- Website: barcouncil.gov.bd

The Bangladesh Bar Council (Bengali: বাংলাদেশ বার কাউন্সিল) is a statutory autonomous body in Bangladesh, established under the Legal Practitioners and the Bar Council Order, 1972. It is the licensing and regulatory body for lawyers in Bangladesh. The Bangladesh Bar Council ensures that every lawyer maintains the highest professional standards and adheres to proper etiquette.

The bar council can establish tribunals to investigate and prosecute complaints against lawyers. In 2019, there were five such tribunals. A tribunal may reprimand or suspend a lawyer or remove them from practice. It dealt with 378 complaints from 2014 to 2018. Nine lawyers have lost their licenses permanently and six were suspended for a limited period of time.

== History ==
The council was established in 1972 through the Legal Practitioners and the Bar Council Order. It has 15 members with the attorney general of Bangladesh as its chairman. It publishes a law journal called Bangladesh Legal Decisions. Members are elected to the council. The elected members, in their first meeting, elect from amongst themselves a vice-chairman and different standing committees, viz- Executive Committee, Finance Committee, Legal Education Committee, Enrolment Committee, etc.
