= Government Suhrawardi College =

College in Pirojpur Sadar, Bangladesh

- Established: 1 July 1957
- Affiliations: National University
- Location: Pirojpur Sadar, Bangladesh
- Language: Bengali, English
- Website: gsc.edu.bd

Government Suhrawardi College is a public educational institution located in Pirojpur Sadar Upazila of Pirojpur District, Bangladesh. Established in 1957, the college is affiliated with the National University. It offers Higher Secondary, Degree, and some undergraduate-level programs.

== History ==
The college was founded in 1957 as a higher secondary institution. The B.A. (Pass) course was introduced in 1961, and honors-level courses began in 1993.

== Notable alumni ==
- Ziauddin Ahmed
- Kazi Saifuddin
- Jewel Aich
