= Pirojpur-1 =

Constituency of Bangladesh's Jatiya Sangsad

Coordinates: 22.58°N 89.98°E

- Constituency for the Jatiya Sangsad
- District: Pirojpur District
- Division: Barisal Division
- Electorate: 392,178 (2026)

Current constituency
- Created: 1984
- Party: Bangladesh Jamaat-e-Islami
- Member: Masood Sayedee
- ← 126 Jhalokati-2 128 Pirojpur-2 →

Pirojpur-1 is a constituency represented in the Jatiya Sangsad (National Parliament) of Bangladesh since 2026 by Masood Sayedee of the Bangladesh Jamaat-e-Islami.

== Boundaries ==
The constituency encompasses Nazirpur, Pirojpur Sadar, and Nesarabad upazilas.

== History ==
The constituency was created in 1984 from the Bakerganj-14 constituency when the former Bakerganj District was split into four districts: Bhola, Bakerganj, Jhalokati, and Pirojpur.

Ahead of the 2008 general election, the Election Commission redrew constituency boundaries to reflect population changes revealed by the 2001 Bangladesh census. The 2008 redistricting altered the boundaries of the constituency.

Ahead of the 2014 general election, the Election Commission swapped Zianagar Upazila from Pirojpur-1 to Pirojpur-2, and Nesarabad Upazila from Pirojpur-2 to Pirojpur-1.

== Members of Parliament ==
Election	Member	Party
1986	Mostafa Jamal Haider	Jatiya Party
1991	Sudhangshu Shekhar Haldar	Awami League
Feb 1996	Gazi Nuruzzaman Babul	Bangladesh Nationalist Party
Jun 1996	Delwar Hossain Sayeedi	Bangladesh Jamaat-e-Islami
2001	Delwar Hossain Sayeedi	Bangladesh Jamaat-e-Islami
2008	A. K. M. A. Awal Saydur Rahman	Awami League
2014	A. K. M. A. Awal Saydur Rahman	Awami League
2018	SM Rezaul Karim	Awami League
2024	SM Rezaul Karim	Awami League
2026	Masood Sayedee	Bangladesh Jamaat-e-Islami

== Elections ==
=== Elections in the 2020s ===
General Election 2026: Pirojpur-1
Party	Candidate	Votes	%	±%
Jamaat	Masood Sayedee	132,659	55.3	N/A
BNP	Alamgir Hossain	107,105	44.7	N/A
Majority		25,554	10.6	N/A
Turnout		239,764	61.1	N/A
Jamaat gain from AL				

=== Elections in the 2010s ===
AKMA Awal was re-elected unopposed in the 2014 general election after opposition parties withdrew their candidacies in a boycott of the election.

=== Elections in the 2000s ===
General Election 2008: Pirojpur-1
Party	Candidate	Votes	%	±%
AL	AKMA Awal	101,710	48.8	+8.9
Jamaat	Delwar Hossain Sayeedi	94,714	45.5	−11.7
JP(E)	Mostafa Jamal Haider	8,406	4.0	N/A
Jatiya Party (M)	Md. Nazrul Islam	2,536	1.2	−0.9
United Citizen Movement	Md. Abu Sayed	512	0.2	N/A
Bangladesh Kalyan Party	Tapan Kumar Mitra	275	0.1	N/A
BDB	Shamsul Jalal Chowdhury	98	0.0	N/A
Independent	Syed Shahidul Haque Jamal	38	0.0	N/A
Majority		6,996	3.4	−14.0
Turnout		208,289	87.1	+10.7
AL gain from Jamaat				

General Election 2001: Pirojpur-1
Party	Candidate	Votes	%	±%
Jamaat	Delwar Hossain Sayeedi	110,108	57.2	+20.2
AL	Sudhangshu Shekhar Haldar	76,731	39.9	+3.1
Jatiya Party (M)	Md. Nazrul Islam	4,059	2.1	N/A
IJOF	Sadeq Ahmmad	1,053	0.5	N/A
Independent	Abdullahil Mahmud	209	0.1	N/A
JSD	Pankaj Kumar Dakua	120	0.1	N/A
Independent	Manindra Nath Dhali	58	0.0	N/A
Majority		33,377	17.4	+17.2
Turnout		192,338	76.4	−0.9
Jamaat hold				

=== Elections in the 1990s ===
General Election June 1996: Pirojpur-1
Party	Candidate	Votes	%	±%
Jamaat	Delwar Hossain Sayeedi	55,717	37.0	+20.3
AL	Sudhangshu Shekhar Haldar	55,437	36.8	−8.7
JP(E)	Mostafa Jamal Haider	30,009	19.9	+17.7
BNP	Gazi Nuruzzaman Babul	5,912	3.9	−27.8
IOJ	Sheikh Rafique Ahmed	2,904	1.9	−0.7
Zaker Party	Shahedul Islam Panna	309	0.2	−0.1
Independent	Khitish Chandra Mondol	228	0.2	N/A
Islamic Sashantantrik Andolan	Md. Belaet Hossien Al Feroji	190	0.1	N/A
FP	Md. Emdadul Kabir	35	0.0	N/A
Majority		280	0.2	−13.7
Turnout		150,741	77.3	+25.0
Jamaat gain from AL				

General Election 1991: Pirojpur-1
Party	Candidate	Votes	%	±%
AL	Sudhangshu Shekhar Haldar	55,405	45.5	
BNP	Gazi Nuruzzaman Babul	38,538	31.7	
Jamaat	Tofazzel Hossain	20,350	16.7	
IOJ	A. Jabbar	3,215	2.6	
JP(E)	Shidul Haider	2,680	2.2	
Ganatantri Party	Ali Haider Khan	474	0.4	
Zaker Party	Shahidul Kalam	369	0.3	
Independent	A. H. Nasir Ali	256	0.2	
Jatiya Oikkya Front	Rejaul Karim	193	0.2	
Independent	Liaqat Ali Sheikh	168	0.1	
Bangladesh National Congress	Amar Krishna	54	0.0	
Majority		16,867	13.9	
Turnout		121,702	52.3	
AL gain from JP(E)				
