= Pirojpur Government High School =

Location
- Post Office Road; Pirojpur; 8500; Bangladesh; 22.5793507°N 89.9660869°E

Information
- Type: Government school
- Motto: "Knowledge is the key to success"
- Established: 19 April 1909
- Closed: 5:00 pm
- School board: Board of Intermediate and Secondary Education, Barisal
- School district: Pirojpur
- Principal: Md. Babur Talukdar
- Faculty: Science, Humanities, Commerce
- Grades: Class 4 – Class 10
- Gender: Boys
- Language: Bengali
- Campus size: 8.82 acres
- Campus type: Urban
- Colour
- Sports: Cricket, Football, Basketball, Discus throw, 100 metres, 400 metres, Chess, Volleyball
- Nickname: Govt. School, PGHS, Boys School
- Team name: PGHS CRICKET TEAM, PGHS FOOTBALL TEAM,
- Newspaper: PGHS PULSE, PGHS Network
- Yearbook: Proticchobi
- Communities served: Pirojpur Govt. High School (PGHS)
- Feeder schools: Primary School
- Special project: Classroom cleanliness program under the supervision of the British Council
- Website: www.pirojpurgovtschool.edu.bd

Pirojpur Government High School is a historic and prestigious government secondary educational institution located in the Pirojpur district of Bangladesh. Established in 1909, the school has retained its reputation among educational institutions in the southern region despite changes over time. Throughout its nearly one and a half centuries of journey, the school has been associated with the memories of many distinguished personalities of the country. The founding editor of the Daily Ittefaq, Tofazzal Hossain Manik Mia, poet Ahsan Habib, educationist Kabir Chowdhury, along with many others have enriched the legacy of this institution. The school’s large building, standing across its spacious campus in the heart of Pirojpur town, is a symbol of history, heritage, and pride. The institution operates in two shifts—morning and day—offering education from 4th to 10th grade. By consistently securing top positions under the Barisal Education Board in the SSC examinations, the school has already earned recognition as one of the best educational institutions in the country. Currently, about 1,300 students are studying here, and Md. Babar Talukder is serving as the acting headteacher. Numerous distinguished alumni who have made contributions to education, literature, arts, politics, administration, business, and entertainment have further increased the reputation of this institution.

== History ==
For administrative convenience, the British government declared Pirojpur a separate subdivision in 1859. Following this declaration, the subdivision gradually began transforming into a town or urban center. By 1865, a community of educated and conscious residents had already developed in the area. In this continuity, during 1866–67, under Sir John Lawrence, the institution that is now Pirojpur Government High School emerged as a lower secondary school under the name “National School.” To meet the educational needs of the children of this newly settled, education-friendly community, student enrollment at the National Junior School increased rapidly. Due to the growing demand for higher education, the school was upgraded to the higher-secondary level in 1882. Later, on 14 December 1885, the British government allocated 6.68 acres of land for the construction of necessary infrastructure for the school. For administrative centralization and the protection of colonial interests, settlements of lawyers, advocates, physicians, traditional healers, businessmen, and court employees began to develop in Pirojpur town. Several forward-thinking individuals from this community—Ugrakanta Roy, Binod Lal Mukherjee, Ambika Charan Sarkar, Kalikanta Sarkhel, Ukil Pyari Lakh Basu, Priyanath Basu, Priyanath Mitra, among others—played significant roles in establishing the school. Over time, the British administration gradually came to regard the school as an institution “influenced by Swadeshi ideals.” Against this backdrop, on 19 April 1909, the school was declared a government high school, and on 1 July of the same year, it officially began operating as a government higher secondary school. The following year, in 1910, the government appointed Bijoy Krishna Sen—a trusted teacher of the administration—as headmaster; he managed the school for about 14 years according to British administrative policies. In 1924, when Sher-e-Bangla A. K. Fazlul Huq was appointed Education Minister of the Bengal government, he took initiatives to build student hostels for the school. Through his efforts, a brick-built Muslim hostel and a separate tin-roofed Hindu hostel were constructed in 1934. Additionally, a large east–west–facing tin-shed building was also built. In 1960, a two-storied hostel was completed. Nearly a century ago, long before the modern Midday Meal System in Bangladesh, a tradition of providing tiffin to students had already been established at the school. During that period, the library, science laboratory, common room, and geography room were founded as well. The annual school magazine was published in both winter and summer seasons. The editor of the 1934 issue was a student of that time, Master Habib (later the renowned poet Ahsan Habib). As the school became the leading educational attraction of the southern region, a temporary hostel was built in the area now known as Ukilpara for students from distant areas outside the subdivision. Another building was later constructed, located between the current new hostel and the old science laboratory. When a devastating cyclone destroyed the tin-shed building in 1961, the present large two-storied administrative building was constructed. In 2005, another new two-storied hostel was built on the school premises. At present, the school stands on a total of 8.82 acres of land.

== Student uniform ==
The designated school uniform of Pirojpur Government High School consists of a full-sleeve white shirt and white pants. It is to be worn with a black belt and white sneakers. During winter, a blue sweater is compulsory as part of the uniform.

== Notable alumni ==
- Tofazzal Hossain Manik Miah, Bengali politician and journalist
- Ahsan Habib
- Kazi Saifuddin
- Ziauddin Ahmed
- Golam Mustafa
- Mostafa Jamal Haider
- Jewel Aich, Bangladeshi stage magician

== Centennial and 11-Year celebration ==
On 3 December 2021, a grand reunion titled One Century and One Decade Celebration was organized by the alumni of Pirojpur Government High School.
