= Kazi Saifuddin =

Bangladeshi psychologist

1st Vice-Chancellor

Pirojpur Science and Technology University
- In office 20 September 2022 – 27 October 2024
- Preceded by: Office established
- Succeeded by: Shahidul Islam

Personal details
- Born: 1964 (age 61–62) Backergunge District, East Pakistan, Pakistan
- Education: University of Rajshahi; Kobe University, Japan
- Occupation: Professor, academic administrator

Kazi Saifuddin (born 1964) is a Bangladeshi psychologist and academic. He is a professor in the Department of Psychology at Jagannath University (JNU) and served as the first Vice-Chancellor of the Pirojpur Science and Technology University located in Pirojpur District, Bangladesh.

== Early life ==
He was born in 1964 in present-day Pirojpur District, located in the Barishal Division, Bangladesh. His father, Kazi Shamsul Haque, was a freedom fighter, and his mother was Begum Fatema Khatun. His father was martyred during the Bangladesh Liberation War in 1971.

== Education ==
Saifuddin completed his SSC in 1980 from Pirojpur Government High School and HSC in 1982 from Government Suhrawardi College. He obtained his BSc (Honours) in 1988 and MSc in 1990 in Psychology from the University of Rajshahi, securing first place in both examinations. He earned his PhD in 2001 from Kobe University in Japan.

== Career ==
Saifuddin began his career as a member of the Bangladesh Civil Service (Education Cadre) and taught at several government colleges across the country. Later, he joined the Department of Psychology at Jagannath University. Alongside teaching, he served as a syndicate member, Dean of the Faculty of Life and Earth Sciences, department chair, President and General Secretary of the Jagannath University Teachers’ Association, Executive Member of the Federation of Bangladesh University Teachers’ Associations, and Treasurer of the Bangladesh Psychological Association. He has also been active in several social and professional organizations.

From 20 September 2022 to 27 October 2024, Saifuddin served as the first Vice-Chancellor of the Pirojpur Science and Technology University.

== Publications ==
He has published around fifty research articles in national and international journals and is the author of about thirty books.
