= Delwar Hossain Sayeedi =

Bangladeshi politician convicted of war crimes (1940–2023)

- দেলাওয়ার হোসাইন সাঈদী
- Delwar Hossain Sayeedi

Member of Parliament
- In office 14 July 1996 – 27 October 2006
- Preceded by: Gazi Nuruzzaman Babul
- Succeeded by: A. K. M. A. Awal Saydur Rahman
- Constituency: Pirojpur-1

Nayeb-e-Ameer of Bangladesh Jamaat-e-Islami
- In office 2009 – 14 August 2023
- Ameer: Motiur Rahman Nizami; Maqbul Ahmed; Shafiqur Rahman

Personal details
- Born: 2 February 1940 Pirojpur District, Bengal Presidency, British India
- Died: 14 August 2023 (aged 83) Dhaka, Bangladesh
- Party: Bangladesh Jamaat-e-Islami
- Children: Rafique; Shameem; Masood; Nasim
- Occupation: Politician

Delwar Hossain Sayeedi (2 February 1940 – 14 August 2023) was a Bangladeshi Islamist leader, politician, and convicted war criminal who served as a Member of Parliament representing the Pirojpur-1 constituency from 1996 to 2006. Before entering politics, Sayeedi delivered Islamic lectures at Waz Mahfils in Bangladesh. As a mufassir, he was recognized by the president of the Affairs of the Two Holy Mosques, Sheikh Abdul Rahman Al-Sudais.

In 2013, the International Crimes Tribunal (ICT) in Bangladesh found him guilty of eight out of twenty charges, including murder, rape, and religious persecution, sentencing him to death. Human Rights Watch and Amnesty International reported that the tribunal fell short of international standards. The verdict led to public protests, riots, and clashes. In September 2014, the Supreme Court commuted his sentence to life imprisonment. Sayeedi died on 14 August 2023 at the age of 83 following cardiac arrest.

== Early life ==
Sayeedi received his first primary religious education at his local village madrasah built by his father. Sayeedi attended the Sarsina Alia Madrasah in 1962, followed by the Khulna Alia Madrasah. Sayeedi and his family fled to Jessore seeking safety and stayed at the house of a pir for about two weeks from around 1 April 1971. After that, the Sayeedi family took refuge in Mohiron village, Bagharpara, Jessore, at the house of Roushan Ali.

== Political career ==
Sayeedi joined Bangladesh Jamaat-e-Islami in 1979. He became a Rukon of Jamaat in 1982 and a Shura member of Majlis in 1989. In 1996, he became a member of the executive council of Jamaat. He served as Nayeb-e-Ameer of Bangladesh Jamaat-e-Islami from 2009 until his death. Sayeedi was elected as a Member of Parliament for the Pirojpur-1 constituency in the June 1996 and 2001 general elections. Following the 2001 election, his opponent filed a lawsuit against him for electoral fraud. In 2003, the High Court nullified the election after finding that Sayeedi had violated campaign rules and failed to report the source of his election expenses. Sayeedi appealed to the Supreme Court and obtained a stay order, allowing him to remain a Member of Parliament until the end of the government's tenure.

== Trial ==
The government of Bangladesh established the International Crimes Tribunal (ICT) to prosecute individuals accused of committing war crimes, genocide, and atrocities during the 1971 war of independence. Sayeedi was brought before the tribunal following his arrest, and his trial proceeded after a one-month medical delay

=== Accusations ===
The ICT indicted Sayeedi on 20 of 31 prosecution charges in numerous crimes, including the killing of more than 50 people, arson, rape, looting, and forcibly converting Hindus to Islam.

=== Arrest ===
On 24 July 2009, immigration officials at Zia International Airport prevented Sayeedi from travelling abroad. He challenged the government's actions by filing a petition with the High Court on 27 July. The Appellate Division upheld the travel ban on 12 August, hours after the High Court declared the government's refusal to allow him to board an overseas flight illegal. The Attorney General stated before the Chamber Judge that Sayeedi had opposed the independence of Bangladesh in 1971. He argued that if Sayeedi was not barred from foreign travel, he might work against the government's efforts to bring justice for war crimes during that conflict. On 21 March 2010, Syed Rejaul Haque Chandpuri, secretary general of the Bangladesh Tarikat Federation, filed a case accusing Delwar Hossain Sayeedi and five other Jamaat leaders of hurting religious sentiment. He was subsequently arrested.

=== Charge sheets ===
On 12 August 2009, Manik Poshari filed a case in Pirojpur against Delwar Hossain Sayeedi and four others. His accusations related to events during the 1971 Bangladeshi War of Independence. Mahbubul Alam Howladar, a former pro-independence fighter and currently a member and deputy commander of the pro-independence fighters association called Zianagor Upazila Muktijoddha Sangsad, filed charges against Sayeedi with the Pirojpur senior judicial magistrate's court in Zianagar. Sayeedi's war crimes trial began on 20 November 2011 at the International Crimes Tribunal in Bangladesh. The tribunal charged him with twenty counts of crimes against humanity, including murder, rape, and arson, during the War of Independence. Some of the charges were:

- Passing secret information on the gathering of people behind the Madhya Masimpur bus stand to the Pakistan Army, and leading the Army there, where 20 unnamed people were shot and killed.
- The abduction and killing of government officials (deputy magistrate – Saif Mizanur Rahman, sub-divisional police officer – Foyezur Rahman Ahmed, and sub-divisional officer – Abdur Razzak) of Pirojpur.
- Identifying and looting the homes and shops of people belonging to the Awami League, Hindu community, and supporters of the war at Parerhat Bazar under Pirojpur Sadar.
- Leading an operation, accompanied by the Pakistan Army, to burn 25 homes of the Hindu community at Umedpur village (under the jurisdiction of Indurkani Police Station).
- Leading the group who abducted three women from the house of Gouranga Saha of Parerhat Bandar and handing them over to the Pakistan Army to be raped.

Sultan Ahmed Howlader, the fourth prosecution witness in the trial, testified that during the war, Sayeedi and his associate Moshleuddin confined Bipod Shaha's daughter Vanu Shaha at Parerhat, Pirojpur district, and regularly raped her. Another witness testified that Sayeedi had organised the Razakar militia, a paramilitary force that aided the Pakistan Army in Pirojpur. The trial saw 28 witnesses for the prosecution and 16 for the defence. In addition, the tribunal received 16 witness statements given to the investigator after the prosecution argued that those witnesses were either dead, or that producing them before the tribunal would incur unreasonable delay or expense.

=== Witness abduction ===
On 5 November 2012, Sukhranjan Bali, a prosecution witness who instead testified as a defense witness, was abducted outside the International Crimes Tribunal, allegedly by the Bangladesh Police. Human rights groups believed it to be a case of forced disappearance. Later, Bali was handed over to India's Border Security Force. "The apparent abduction of a witness in a trial at the ICT is a cause for serious concern about the conduct of the prosecution, judges and government," said a spokesperson for Human Rights Watch. Bali had been expected to counter prosecution allegations about Sayeedi's involvement in the 1971 murder of Bali's brother.

=== Conviction ===
The tribunal found Sayeedi guilty of 8 of the 20 charges, including mass killing, rape, arson, looting, and forcing minority Hindus to convert to Islam during 1971. On 28 February 2013, the tribunal sentenced him to death by hanging for two of the eight charges committed during the War of Independence in 1971. Sayeedi was sentenced to death for the offences listed in charge numbers 8 and 10. The court did not pass separate sentences of imprisonment for the offences listed in charge numbers 6, 7, 11, 14, 16, and 19, which it said had been proven beyond a reasonable doubt. At the same time, the accused was found not guilty of the crimes against humanity listed in charge numbers 1, 2, 3, 4, 5, 9, 12, 13, 15, 17, 18, and 20, and was acquitted of the said charges. Sayeedi's lawyers boycotted the trial and stated that the charges against Sayeedi and others were politically motivated.

=== Reactions ===
Various groups, including the Bangladesh Nationalist Party and Jamaat, questioned the legitimacy of the tribunal and conviction. His defence at the trial argued that this was a case of mistaken identity, stating that the original perpetrator was a man named Delwar Hossain Shikdar, who had been apprehended and executed by Mukti Bahini troops after the war. By the afternoon of the day of the primary verdict, clashes had erupted across Bangladesh between Islamist activists and police forces. An estimated 100 protesters died countrywide in a subsequent series of protests and crackdowns. According to the BBC, it marked "the worst day of political violence in Bangladesh in decades". Amnesty International released a statement on Sayeedi's trial. It noted that the organization neither endorsed the calls for capital punishment in the case of Delwar Hossain Sayeedi, nor could it affirm that the trials aligned with global benchmarks for impartial legal proceedings. On 2 November 2011, Human Rights Watch released a statement urging the Bangladeshi government to address and investigate instances of intimidation and threats against defense lawyers and witnesses involved in cases at the International Crimes Tribunal (ICT). Furthermore, Human Rights Watch said the proceedings of the trial fell short of international standards and urged a retrial. BT Today pointed out that no DNA testing was conducted, and some locals denied that he was involved. His family claimed that he was not in Pirojpur at the time and lived in the New Market area of Jessore.

=== Appeal hearings ===
On 17 September 2014, the Appellate Division of the Bangladesh Supreme Court, led by Chief Justice Md. Muzammel Hossain, and comprising a five-member bench, delivered a verdict reducing Sayeedi's sentence from the death penalty to life imprisonment for war crimes. The judgment reflected varying opinions among the judges.

== Travel and media appearances ==
In 2004, the US Terrorist Screening Center added Sayeedi to its No Fly List, established to prevent suspected radicals and terrorists from flying into the US. In July 2006, Sayeedi travelled to the UK to address rallies in London and Luton; his entry was cleared by the Foreign Office. Many British MPs considered his admission to the country to be controversial. In leaked emails reported by The Times, an adviser, Eric Taylor, said that Sayeedi's "previous visits to the UK have been reportedly marred by violence caused by his supporters." On 13 July 2006, the British journalist Martin Bright released a documentary called Who Speaks For Muslims?, which included Sayeedi and identified him as having extreme views. Sayeedi has a large supporter base within the British Bangladeshi community. He was invited to speak at the East London Mosque on 14 July 2006; the then Secretary General of the Muslim Council of Britain, Muhammad Abdul Bari, supported his invitation.

== Death ==
On 14 August 2023 at 8:40 pm, Sayeedi, aged 83, died at BMU after experiencing a cardiac arrest. Following his death, thousands of mourners and supporters assembled outside the hospital premises in a rally. Sayeedi's son Masud alleged that the then Bangladesh Awami League government, under the leadership of Sheikh Hasina, was involved in his death through judicial and medical processes. He was buried in his native village in Pirojpur, Barisal.

== Selected published books ==
- Biography of the Hereafter
- The Principle of Building a Corruption-Free Society
- Demands and Relevant Ideas for Banning Religion-Based Politics
- Why I Joined Jamaat-e-Islami
- Islam to Suppress Terrorism and Militancy
- Baby Training Methods
- Prayers of the Prophet
- Why Qadianis are not Muslims
- The Miracle of the Holy Qur'an
- In the Land of the Blue Sea
- My Duty to My Family
- Open Letter
- The Easy Process of Gaining Paradise
- The Ordeal of Faith
- Social Life in the Light of Hadith
