= Masood Sayedee =

Bangladeshi politician

- মাসুদ সাঈদী
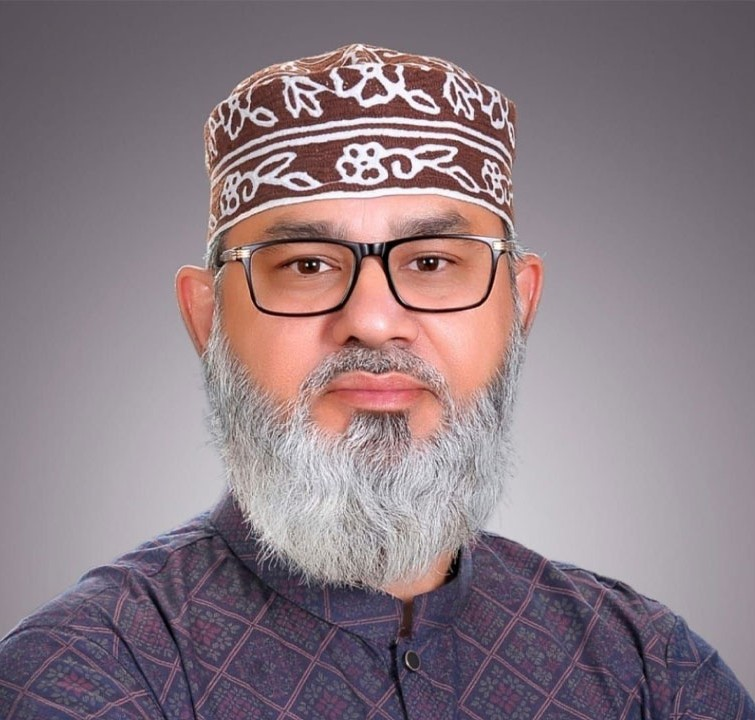

Member of the Bangladesh Parliament for Pirojpur-1
- Incumbent
- Assumed office 16 February 2026
- Preceded by: SM Rezaul Karim

Personal details
- Born: October 24, 1971 (age 55) Saidkhali, Zianagar, Pirojpur, East Pakistan
- Party: Bangladesh Jamaat-e-Islami
- Parent: Delwar Hossain Sayeedi (father)
- Occupation: Businessperson and politician

Masood Sayedee (Bengali: মাসুদ সাঈদী) is a Bangladesh Jamaat-e-Islami politician and an elected member of parliament from Pirojpur-1. He is the son of former Bangladesh Jamaat-e-Islami Nayeb-e-Ameer and member of parliament Delwar Hossain Sayeedi.

== Early life ==
Masud Saeedi was born on 24 October 1971 in Saidkhali village of Zianagar, East Pakistan. His father, Delwar Hossain Sayeedi, was an Islamic speaker and politician.
