= Bangladesh anti-Hindu violence =

Bangladesh anti-Hindu violence may refer to:

- 1990 Bangladesh anti-Hindu violence
- 2013 Bangladesh anti-Hindu violence
- 2014 Bangladesh anti-Hindu violence
- 2021 Bangladesh anti-Hindu violence
- 2022 Bangladesh anti-Hindu violence
- 2024 Bangladesh anti-Hindu violence
- 2025 Bangladesh anti-Hindu violence
