= Baithak (disambiguation) =

Baithak or bethak literally means "seat" or "place to seat" in several Indic languages and may refer to:

- Baithak, a type of Hindustani classical music performance
  - Baithak Gana, the Surinamese music
- Bethak redirects to squat, a type of exercise
- Pushtimarg Baithak, a sacred sites in Pushtimarg tradition of Vaishnava Hinduism
- Mehmaan khana, the sitting rooms of North India and Pakistan

== See also ==
- Baithakata, a village in Bangladesh
