= 2022 Bangladesh anti-Hindu violence =

Violence against Hindus in 2022

Several incidents of violence and human rights violations against the Hindu community were reported in Bangladesh at various times during 2022, which include vandalism of temples and idols, arson, looting of Hindu homes and businesses, murder, rape, harassment, and land grabbing.

== January to June ==
The Secretary General of the Bangladesh National Hindu Grand Alliance, Govinda Chandra Pramanik, claimed that from 1 January to 30 June 79 people from the Hindu community were killed. This included 468 incidents of house attacks, vandalism, and looting; 343 acts of arson; 93 business attacks; 2,159.36 acres of land usurped; and 419.63 acres of land attempted to be seized. Moreover, temple land grabbing in 29 cases, organized attacks in 501, attacks, vandalism and arson in temples in 56 cases, vandalism of idols in 219 cases, theft of idols in 50 cases and hurting religious sentiments in 63 incidents occurred within the country. Besides that, 57 cases of desecration of religious establishments, 60 cases of obstruction in religious ceremonies and 100 cases where people were forced to consume forbidden food in their religion were reported.

=== January ===
- On Monday night, 24 January 2022, the house factory of professional idol maker Ranjan Kumar Pal in Agardari village of Satkhira Sadar Upazila was vandalized, and the idols were destroyed. Four completed Kali idols along with 49 Saraswati idols prepared for painting were destroyed at that time. Police said that the culprit had not been identified.

=== February ===
- On the night of Tuesday, 15 February, the main gate of Sarbajanin Sri Sri Kali Temple in Bisharkandi area of Banaripara Upazila, Barisal was broken, and the idols of Kali and Mahadev were vandalised.

=== March ===
- On 17 March, communal violence occurred at the Radha-Kanta Jew ISKCON temple in the Wari area in Old Dhaka: that day, the Hindu community was celebrating the Holi festival. A group of around 200 Muslim attackers tried to seize the temple land by breaking down a boundary wall and carried out vandalism. Three people were injured trying to resist the attack.
- On Monday, 21 March, one fundamentalist Muslim named Ijazul Islam Khan climbed the gate of a temple at No. 7 Culvert Road in Tilpapara, Khilgaon, and vandalized the idols, scattering everything. Later, police arrested Ijazul Islam Khan after analyzing CCTV footage along with other evidence. Police also reported that the attacker was mentally unstable.

=== April ===
- On 11 April, a Hindu house was burned over alleged blasphemy on Facebook in Amarbunia village in Morelganj, Bagerhat, and a temple half a kilometer away from there was also vandalized. On 12 April, police arrested seven people who took part in this incident.

=== May ===
- On 30 May, Monday, some unidentified miscreants suddenly attacked the devotees who performed some religious rituals on the veranda of Basudev Temple located in Beanibazar, Sylhet. Later, police arrested Mohammad Ali Ahmed, a young man from the area in this connection. During the attack, ten devotees were injured.

=== June ===
- On 5 June, Sunday, two temples over than 50 years old in village Jandi, Tujarpur Union, Bhanga Upazila, Faridpur, were attacked: Sarbojanin Durga Temple and Mitrabari Family Temple. The locks were broken in the at night; the idols were vandalized and fires set.
- On 20 June, an 18-year-old girl, a class XI student from the Char Dakatia area of Chitalmari Upazila, Bagerhat, made derogatory and insulting comments about Islam and Muhammad on her Facebook account, and shared a video. Following this, tensions rose in the area, and on the night of 19 June (Sunday), the police arrested her. A clash occurred between the police and a group of outraged people in front of Chitalmari police station over the offensive post, resulting in at least 25 people being injured, including 12 police officers.

== July to December ==
=== July ===
- On the night of Monday, 4 July, attack and vandalism at four family temples in Hindupara village, Damodarpur of Taluk Kanupur Union, Gobindaganj Upazila in Gaibandha. Using a motorcycle, a man named Ariful Islam took along sticks and sharp weapons and started breaking the idols in the temples. There were two Lakshmi temples and one Kali and Shiva temple.
- Communal violence erupted over a Facebook post in the Dighalia Bazaar of Lohagara Upazila in Narail, on Friday, 15 July. Police arrested a Hindu named Ashok Saha, because of the post. Akash Saha claimed that his Facebook account was hacked. A human chain was staged in the evening demanding the arrest of the accused. At around 7:30 PM, during the protest, looters and vandals gathered and attacked more than 10 shops owned by the Hindu community in Dighalia Bazaar. They also looted and destroyed four houses, stole cash and gold jewelry, and set fire to the properties. The attackers, accusing the residents of disrespecting Islam, also threw stones at the Akhrabari Sarbojonin Temple and set it on fire at around 9 PM.
- On 31 July night, about 8:30 PM, eight Hindu houses in Kamaria village of Sailkupa Upazila in Jhenaidah were attacked and looted. At least 15 Hindus, including women, were injured in the incident. With local weapons, the assailants entered the village and first of all, they demanded a bribe of 300,000 taka from tea seller Deb Kumar. When he refused, they assaulted him. They also withdrew 120,000 taka from the account of fertilizer trader Bikash Mandal and beat him up. They broke into several houses, abused the inmates verbally, and looted cash and gold ornaments.

=== August ===
- On 1 August, police arrested four teens for breaking an idol in the Sheetala temple in the Kathulia area of Pirojpur Sadar Upazila. The ages were from 12 to 17 years.
- Idols were vandalised in Mongla on 6 August during a football match that was taking place near the temple.
- Two idols of Hindu Gods Shiva and Manasa were vandalised alongside a holy place on fire in the night of 9 August in Nagdanga village under Naodanga Union of Fulbari Upazila in Kurigram district.
- On 19 August, some terrorists from Srifalkati village led by Rashedul Islam and Ebadul Islam attacked the Munda indigenous people at Dhumghat, Shyamnagar Upazila, Satkhira, and tried to occupy the lands. Narendra Nath Munda, Sulata Munda, Bilasi Munda, and Rani Munda were seriously injured and sent to Shyamnagar Hospital for treatments and later shifted to Satkhira Medical College Hospital. Narendra Nath Munda died during treatment on Saturday afternoon, 20 August. A case was filed by his nephew Phanindranath Munda, accusing 22 named individuals along with 170 unidentified people. Police arrested five suspects.
- On 21 August, in Laskar Union, Paikgachha, Khulna, 13 people were injured during an attack when they tried to resist a forced land seizure attempt by opposing parties. Two of the injured were sent to Khulna Medical College Hospital for advanced treatment.
- During the night of 21 August, two temples were attacked in Shibganj Upazila of Bogura. Several idols in a Lakshmi temple and another Hari temple, located on the outskirts of the village, were damaged. The police arrested the accused Rabiul Islam.
- On 26 August, an idol newly constructed in the Durga temple of Ward No. 1, Shibpur Kanardanga, Satkhira Sadar Upazila, was vandalized after 11 PM.
- On the night of 27 August, a newly built idol at Bhadiakhola village's universal Durga temple, Harirampur Upazila, Manikganj, was vandalized.

=== September ===
- Lately at night on 17 September, an idol that was being constructed in the Kashipur Durga temple of Mehendiganj Upazila, Barisal, was vandalized.
- Another such incident happened on 19 September in Narsingdi, when Hindu students with sindoor (vermillion) and bangles were not allowed to enter the examination hall in order to attend the SSC exam. They were compelled to remove the vermillion and bangles before entering the examination center.
- On 23 September, an idol in a temple of Jayala Nolta village, Tala Upazila, Satkhira was vandalised. Some Muslim miscreants vandalized the head of the idol in Sahapara temple early in the morning.

=== October ===
- On Sunday, 2 October, at around 9:30 PM, miscreants attacked the Durga Puja Mandap at Shyam Sunder Jiu Akhra and Shiva Temple in Kishoreganj. A police constable named Shafiqul Islam, who was on duty for Puja security, was beaten. The incident occurred after a heated argument with four suspicious individuals he was questioning.

== See also ==
- 2025 Bangladesh anti-Hindu violence
- Persecution of Hindus in Bangladesh
