= SM Rezaul Karim =

Bangladeshi politician

- শেখ মোহাম্মদ রেজাউল করিম
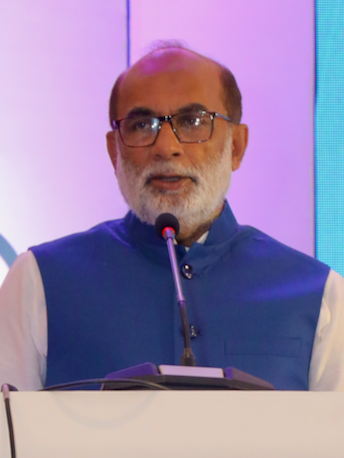

Minister of Fisheries and Livestock
- In office 13 February 2020 – 11 January 2024
- Prime Minister: Sheikh Hasina
- Preceded by: Narayon Chandra Chanda
- Succeeded by: Abdur Rahman

Minister of Housing and Public Works
- In office 7 January 2019 – 13 February 2020
- Prime Minister: Sheikh Hasina
- Preceded by: Mosharraf Hossain
- Succeeded by: Sharif Ahmed (Minister of State)

Member of Parliament
- In office 30 January 2019 – 6 August 2024
- Preceded by: AKMA Awal
- Succeeded by: Masood Sayedee
- Constituency: Pirojpur-1

Personal details
- Born: 18 February 1962 (age 64)
- Party: Bangladesh Awami League
- Education: M.S.S, L.L.B
- Profession: Lawyer, politician

Sheikh Mohammad Rezaul Karim (born 18 February 1962) is a Bangladesh Awami League politician and a former Jatiya Sangsad member representing the Pirojpur-1 constituency during 2019–2024. He is a former minister of fisheries and livestock. Earlier he had served as the minister of housing and public works for 13 months. He left for the United Kingdom following the fall of Sheikh Hasina’s government on 5 August 2024.

== Early life and background ==
Sheikh Mohammad Rezaul Karim was born on 18 February 1962 into one of the landed families of the Pirojpur region of Barisal, the Sheikh family of Nazirpur. His father was Abdul Khaleq Sheikh, a freedom fighter, his mother was Majeda Begum, he was the third born son in the family.

== Criticism ==
Rezaul Karim faces multiple cases regarding corruption allegations. On 19 February 2025, the Anti-Corruption Commission (ACC) filed two separate cases against him and his wife, Firoza Parveen.

He is accused of acquiring assets worth approximately ৳88.6 million (US$730,000) inconsistent with his known sources of income. Similarly, his wife has been charged with possessing illegal assets worth over ৳30.5 million (US$250,000).

Suspicious transactions amounting to nearly ৳68.4 million (US$570,000) were found across his 12 bank accounts, which constitutes an offense under the Money Laundering Prevention Act.

During his tenure as the Minister of Fisheries and Livestock, the ACC also began investigating allegations against him regarding the embezzlement of approximately ৳250 million (US$2.1 million) under the guise of purchasing equipment and training for the "Livestock and Dairy Development Project."

In the interest of a fair investigation, the court ordered the seizure of their income tax documents and the attachment of their immovable properties.

== Career ==
Rezaul Karim was a minister at the Ministry of Fisheries and Livestock and he was a member of parliament (MP) for Pirojpur-1. He is also a member of the executive committee of the National Economic Council (Ecnec), senior advocate of the Supreme Court of Bangladesh (Appellate Division & High Court Division), former minister of housing and public works, former secretary of the Bangladesh Supreme Court Bar. He was the founder and founding chief editor of Bangladeshi newspaper The Daily Ajker Darpon. He is legal affairs secretary of the Bangladesh Awami League's Central Working Committee.

Following the fall of the Sheikh Hasina led Awami League government, Karim's home in Pirojpur was burned down in February 2025. It was burned down again on 18 November 2026.

== Personal life ==
Rezaul Karim is married to Parveen Reza, a poet, and has a son and a daughter both of whom are barristers and are members of the Honorable Society of Lincoln's Inn, London. His son is Sheikh Tanveer Karim and his daughter is Sheikh Sadia Karim, his daughter is the first female barrister from Pirojpur District.
