= Hujra =

Hujra could refer to:

- Sacred Prophetic Chamber- enclosure of Prophet Muhammad's tomb under the Green Dome
- An alternative name for Mehmaan khana, (drawing room) where guests are entertained in many houses in North India, Bangladesh and Pakistan.
- Pashtun Hujra, a communal institution in Pashtuns societies in Afghanistan and Pakistan
