= Bisarkandi =

- Location in Bangladesh
- Coordinates: 22°51′N 90°3′E
- Country: Bangladesh
- Division: Barisal Division
- District: Pirojpur District
- Time zone: UTC+6 (Bangladesh Time)
- Postal code: 8530

Bisarkandi is a village in Barisal District in the Barisal Division of southwestern Bangladesh.
