= Dighia =

Dighia যুগিয়া Jugia
- Location in Bangladesh
- Coordinates: 22°46′N 90°2′E
- Country: Bangladesh
- Division: Barisal Division
- District: Pirojpur District
- Upazila: Nazirpur Upazila
- Time zone: UTC+6 (Bangladesh Time)

Dighia is a village in Nazirpur Upazila of the Pirojpur District in the Barisal Division of southwestern Bangladesh.It is situated besides the Taltola River.Two religious peoples are living there, they are Muslim and Hindu. Muslim is the main religion of this village.
