= Mugarjhor High School =

Location
- Baithakata, Barisal Division; Bangladesh
- Coordinates: 22.8078°N 90.0351°E

Information
- Type: Private secondary school
- Established: 1972

Mugarjhor High School is a private secondary school in Nazirpur Upazila, Pirojpur District, Barisal Division, Bangladesh. It is located in a remote area, near the village of Baithakata, and was founded in 1972.

== See also ==
- Baithakata College
