= Otak =

Otak may refer to:

- Otak-otak, a fish cake eaten throughout Malaysia, Singapore, and Indonesia
- Otaks, a species in the fictional world of Earthsea
- Indonesian and Malay name for brain.
- Otak, a Baithak in villages of Sindh.
