= Indurkani =

- Location in Bangladesh
- Coordinates: 22°28′N 89°58′E
- Country: Bangladesh
- Division: Barisal Division
- District: Pirojpur District
- Time zone: UTC+6 (Bangladesh Time)

Indurkani is a village in Pattashi Union, Indurkani Upazila, Pirojpur District in the Barisal Division of southwestern Bangladesh.
