= Goalbari =

- Location in Bangladesh
- Coordinates: 22°34′N 90°4′E
- Country: Bangladesh
- Division: Barisal Division
- District: Pirojpur District
- Time zone: UTC+6 (Bangladesh Time)

Goalbari is a village in Pirojpur District in the Barisal Division of southwestern Bangladesh.

== Etymology ==
The term "Goalbari" etymologically means "cowherd's house".
