= 2025 Bangladesh anti-Hindu violence =

- Part of the post-resignation violence and the Aftermath of the July Uprising
- Location: Bangladesh
- Target: Hindus of Bangladesh
- Attack type: Attacks on homes, looting, arson, temple vandalism, killings, abuse of women
- Weapons: Cleavers, sticks, sharp weapons, petrol/octane
- Perpetrators: Outlawed Islamist parties and organizations; Local criminal gangs; Awami League (in some cases); Bangladesh Nationalist Party (BNP) (in some cases); Hindus (in some cases)
- Defenders: Local Hindu community; Hindu rights activists (e.g., Bangladesh Sanatani Jagarana Mancha); Students and Muslim community members; Students Against Discrimination; Bangladesh Nationalist Party (BNP) activists; Bangladesh Army; Bangladesh Police
- Motive: Islamic extremism; Anti-Hindu sentiment; Anti-Awami League sentiment; Communalism; Politicide; Deterioration of law and order

Several incidents of violence and human rights violations against the Hindu community were reported in Bangladesh at various times during 2025, which included vandalism of temples and idols, arson, looting of Hindu homes and businesses, murder, rape, harassment, and land grabbing.

== Reports, statistics, and responses ==
=== Statistical overview ===
Data regarding the scale of anti-Hindu violence in 2025 has been compiled by several domestic rights organizations. On 10 July 2025, the Bangladesh Hindu Buddhist Christian Unity Council (BHBCOP), the country's largest minority rights organization, held a press conference reporting 258 incidents of violence against minorities in the first half of the year. These incidents included 20 cases of rape and 59 attacks on places of worship. The council situated these figures within a larger wave of violence, noting a total of 2,244 incidents occurring between 4 August 2024 and 30 June 2025.

Another rights monitor, Ain o Salish Kendra (ASK), documented 160 attacks specifically targeting Hindus between January and September 2025, a figure that included 60 distinct acts of idol vandalism. Addressing the disparity in statistics between various monitoring groups, a UK Home Office report stated that the variation is largely due to classification differences, where some monitors classify incidents as "communal violence" while others categorize the same events as "political violence."

=== International human rights assessments ===
International bodies expressed growing concern over the deterioration of religious freedom in Bangladesh. In a July 2025 factsheet, the United States Commission on International Religious Freedom (USCIRF) concluded that "religious freedom conditions in Bangladesh declined". The commission cited BHBCOP data indicating that in the first quarter of 2025 alone, there were 92 documented incidents, including 11 murders, 3 rapes, and 25 attacks on temples. USCIRF highlighted a pervasive "sense of fear" within the community, noting that Hindu women in certain regions had ceased wearing traditional markers such as bangles and bindis to avoid harassment. The report also drew attention to the continued detention of Hindu priest Chinmoy Krishna Das Prabhu, who was arrested in November 2024 and remained without bail through 2025.

Other international organizations corroborated these findings. Amnesty International reported that "religious minorities and Indigenous Peoples faced violence", emphasizing that mob violence continued to "destroy the lives of minority communities". Similarly, Human Rights Watch stated in July that the interim government was "falling short" on its human rights commitments, pointing to "an alarming surge in mob violence" and persistent violations against minorities.

=== Government response and criticism ===
The interim government of Muhammad Yunus has consistently denied allegations of state negligence or complicity. The Chief Adviser's Press Wing released a statement asserting that an investigation into 22 killings of minorities (spanning 23 incidents) found "not a single one" to be linked to communal violence. In an interview at the United Nations, the chief adviser described reports of violence as "baseless". On 19 January 2026, the Chief Adviser's Press Wing reported that 645 incidents of attacks on minority communities have been recorded in Bangladesh. Of these, police found communal elements in 71 incidents.

This stance was strongly contested by minority leadership. BHBCOP accused the government of "inaction" and "denial", arguing that labeling targeted attacks as generic "political incidents" emboldened perpetrators. Following the chief adviser's UN comments, the council issued a statement on 30 September characterizing the government's position as a "denial of truth", citing previous meetings and UN fact-finding reports. Furthermore, on 7 August, Ain o Salish Kendra (ASK) criticized the administration for failing to meet public expectations, citing the lack of effective countermeasures against mob terrorism.

== Chronology of violence ==
=== Desecration of religious sites and idols ===
Throughout 2025, a persistent campaign of vandalism targeting Hindu temples and murtis was documented across numerous districts. The year began with an incident on 1 January in Moulvibazar, where a Muslim individual disguised as a Hindu was arrested for vandalizing a deity and looting jewellery from a temple in Barlekha Upazila. This was followed by the destruction of idols at the old Pathaboli temple in Kaliakair, Gazipur, on 15 January. Attacks escalated at the end of the month in Faridpur, where a Saraswati idol was vandalized on 31 January; police arrested a suspect who had been previously detained for similar offenses in 2024 but released on grounds of mental instability.

In February, the Dakshin Kalibari temple in Mymensingh saw its Kali idol destroyed, while in Pirojpur, an assault on the Sarbajanin Durga temple and local shops left 10 Hindus injured when they attempted to intervene. A leader of the Bangladesh Jatiotabadi Swechhasebak Dal was arrested later that month for breaking into the Shri Shri Rakshakali Mata temple in Pabna and vandalizing the deity on two separate occasions.

Incidents occurred in Sirajganj and Lakshmipur in March, alongside a more severe event in Nazirpur, Pirojpur, where an Awami League leader and associates demolished a temple and residential homes. The garbhagriha of the central temple at Noakhali Science and Technology University was vandalized on 14 April.

State involvement in the demolition of religious sites became a point of international contention in June. On the eve of the Ratha Yatra festival, Bangladesh Railway officials bulldozed the Khilkhet Durga temple in Dhaka, citing a lack of construction permission. This action drew strong condemnation from India's Ministry of External Affairs and local Hindu leadership, who characterized the demolition as a "deep wound" inflicted under pressure from extremists.

The frequency of attacks increased in the second half of the year. In May, a Kali and Shiva temple in Sitakunda was torched. July saw the destruction of a 10-foot (3.0 m) Kali idol in Natore and vandalism at a temple in Faridpur. In August, two temples were vandalized in Madaripur, and online threats were issued regarding the construction of a mosque on the sacred Chandranath Hill in Sitakunda, though local officials denied any such permission had been granted.

September witnessed a surge in incidents: arson at a temple in Gaibandha; theft of CCTV equipment and vandalism in Kushtia; and damage to idols in Netrokona, Gazipur, Jamalpur, Satkhira, Jhenaidah, Nilphamari, and Manikganj. In October, perpetrators were apprehended following attacks on temples in Munshiganj, while vandalism continued into November with the destruction of eleven deities in Tangail and Radha-Krishna idols in Faridpur.

=== Mob violence and arson ===
Social media rumours served as a catalyst for organized mob violence against Hindu communities. On 29 March, a mob identifying as 'Towhidi Janata' attacked a Hindu home in Sakhipur, Tangail, following a Facebook comment, vandalising the property and publicly burning an image of the goddess Lakshmi.

In May, the Hindu village of Daharmasihati in Abhaynagar, Jessore, was targeted by an Islamist mob numbering hundreds. Eighteen homes were looted, vandalised, and set on fire. Victims reported that administrative assistance was delayed by nearly four hours. A similar large-scale attack occurred on 26 July in Gangachara, Rangpur, where thousands of Islamists looted and burned 15 to 20 Hindu homes. The violence was triggered by a Facebook post allegedly made from a "fake ID" using the name of a local Hindu student, who was subsequently taken into custody by police. Civil society organizations, including the Bangladesh Hindu Buddhist Christian Unity Council and Bangladesh Udichi Shilpigoshthi, as well as students of various universities, condemned the attack and the failure of authorities to protect the minority community.

In December, a Hindu family's house in the Bornikpara area of Ward No. 5 under Raozan Municipality in Chittagong was set on fire at night in a planned attack. The attackers poured kerosene and petrol around the house and ignited it, then locked the doors from outside by fixing hooks. Inside the tin-shed house, 10 people—including two children—were staying in seven rooms. Trapped by the intense fire, the male members of the family used iron rods and sharp tools to break open a door and managed to escape. In a period of five days, similar incidents were reported in three areas of the upazila. In each case, the houses targeted in the alleged arson attacks belonged to Hindu families. Similarly, on 27 December, in Dumritola village, Pirojpur, unidentified individuals set fire to several rooms of a family's residence. The attackers reportedly stuffed cloth into one of the rooms and set it ablaze, causing the fire to spread rapidly throughout the house. In another incident, a Hindu-owned house near Chattitagong was set on fire, trapping eight family members inside as the doors were locked from the outside. The family managed to escape but lost their belongings and pets in the fire. Police arrested five suspects during subsequent raids.

On 30 December 2025, 40-year-old Hindu Bajendra Biswas, a security worker at a factory in Bhaluka Upazila, Mymensingh district, was shot dead by a Muslim around 6:30 pm.

=== Land grabbing and forced eviction ===
Political figures from various parties were implicated in the seizure of property belonging to Hindu families. In March, local BNP leaders were accused of seizing land in Sharsha, Jessore, and assaulting a Hindu family in Sylhet, threatening them with death if they did not vacate their property. In August, a man accused of multiple murders and the rape of a Hindu priest's wife was reported to have used hired thugs to seize land in Kaliganj, Satkhira; police officers at the scene allegedly deleted evidence of the incident from the victims' phones.

In October, a mob of over 80 people demolished a Hindu home in Narail during a land seizure, while in Natore, seven families faced extortion demands and death threats.

On 28 December 2025, at least five houses belonging to a Hindu family were set on fire in Dumritala village, Pirojpur district, amid rising attacks on minority communities under the interim government.

=== Gender-based violence ===
Hindu women were targeted for sexual violence and harassment. In February, a 19-year-old woman in Patuakhali committed suicide following harassment by the son of a Jatiya Party leader. A similar incident involving the filming and online distribution of a sexual assault occurred in Comilla in June. In July, the gang rape of a 14-year-old Tripura girl in Khagrachari sparked protests; the victim's family alleged that the perpetrators were affiliated with the BNP.

=== Targeting of professionals ===
Hindu professionals faced intimidation and physical assault. In April, a school headmaster in Sitakunda was forced to resign by a group including local BNP leaders. In July, an assistant professor of Sanskrit at Chittagong University was confined and harassed by members of Islami Chhatra Andolan Bangladesh. In October, a newspaper editor in Barisal was assaulted by extremists who labeled him a "Kafir" and an "ISKCON member", forced him to sign stamp papers, and threatened his wife with gang rape.A man named Sabir allegedly robbed an electric rickshaw belonging to Kamal Biswas in Jashore. Sabir reportedly justified the robbery by citing a religious interpretation known as Sariya. He claimed that because Kamal was a member of ISKCON, robbing him was permissible under that religious interpretation. In 2026, law enforcement authorities arrested Sabir and several of his associates on allegations of spreading extremism under the guise of teaching martial arts.

=== Mob killing in Bhaluka ===
An incident of mob violence resulting in death occurred on 18 December Thursday night in Bhaluka, Mymensingh District. According to police and BBC Bangla, a Hindu youth was killed following allegations of religious insult. The victim was identified as Dipu Chandra Das. Police officials stated that he worked at a local garment factory and lived in a rented residence in the area. Initial reports indicate that a group of people detained him at around 9:00 p.m. after accusing him of insulting the Prophet of Islam. According to the duty officer of Bhaluka Police Station, the detainees assaulted Das, after which he was stripped, hanged, and later tied to a pole. His body was subsequently set on fire. Police arrived at the scene after receiving information, brought the situation under control, and recovered the body. The body was sent to Mymensingh Medical College Hospital for post-mortem examination.

== See also ==
- 2024 Bangladesh anti-Hindu violence
- Persecution of Hindus in Bangladesh
- Freedom of religion in Bangladesh
- Human rights in Bangladesh
