= Baithakata College =

Intermediate college in Bangladesh

- Type: Intermediate college
- Established: 1999
- Founders: Mahabubur Rahaman
- Principal: Nikhil Acharya
- Students: 50
- Location: Baithakata, Bangladesh; 22.8168°N 90.0450°E

Baithakata College is an intermediate college in Nazirpur Upazila of Pirojpur District, Barisal Division, Bangladesh. It is located in a remote area, near the village of Baithakata. It was founded in 1999 by the industrialist Mahabubur Rahaman, under the Board of Intermediate and Secondary Education, Jessore.

== See also ==
- Mugarjhor High School
