= Jatiya Party (Zafar) =

Political party in Bangladesh

Jatiya Party-JP জাতীয় পার্টি - জেপি
- Chairman: Mostafa Jamal Haider
- Secretary-General: Nawab Ali Abbas Khan
- Founder: Kazi Zafar Ahmed
- Founded: 2013
- Split from: Jatiya Party (Ershad)
- Headquarters: Dhaka
- Ideology: Conservatism (Bangladesh)
- Political position: Centre-right
- Bangladesh Parliament: 0 / 350

The Jatiya Party (Zafar) is a political party in Bangladesh. The party was formed as the result of a disagreement regarding the Jatiya Party led by Hussain Muhammad Ershad.

== History ==
Jatiya Party leader Hussain Muhammad Ershad had suspended Kazi Zafar Ahmed in 2013, for participation in a Hefazat-e-Islam rally in Motijheel. A few hours later, Ahmed tried to expel Ershad from the Jatiya Party, after which he formed his own faction of Jatiya Party. Ahmed criticised Ershad for Jatiya Party's partition at the Awami League-facilitated 2014 Bangladeshi general elections.

Golam Moshi joined the Kazi Zafar faction of Jatiya Party. On 20 December 2013, Ahmed was elected as chairman of the party. On 25 January 2014, the faction joined the Bangladesh Nationalist Party-led 20 Party Alliance.

After Ahmed's death in August 2015, TIM Fazle Rabbi Chowdhury and Mostafa Jamal Haider were appointed the chairman and general-secretary respectively. After Chowdhury's death in December 2018, Haider became the new chairman.
