= Gazi Nuruzzaman Babul =

Bangladeshi politician

Member of Bangladesh Parliament
- In office February 1996 – June 2001
- Preceded by: Sudhangshu Shekhar Haldar
- Succeeded by: Delwar Hossain Sayeedi

Personal details
- Born: Pirojpur District
- Died: 5 August 2024 Dhaka, Bangladesh
- Party: Bangladesh Nationalist Party

Gazi Nuruzzaman Babul (death 5 August 2024) was a Bangladesh Nationalist Party politician and a member of parliament from Pirojpur-1.

== Career ==
Babul was elected to parliament from Pirojpur-1 as a Bangladesh Nationalist Party candidate in February 1996.

In 2018, Babul, then district committee chief of the Bangladesh National Party, sought his party's nomination for the Pirojpur-1 seat. The party instead backed Shameem Sayedee, the son of convicted war criminal Delwar Hossain Sayeedi.
