= Mostafa Jamal Haider =

Bangladeshi politician

- মোস্তফা জামাল হায়দার

Member of Parliament for Pirojpur-1
- In office 1986–1991
- Preceded by: Constituency created
- Succeeded by: Sudhangshu Shekhar Haldar

Personal details
- Born: 10 December 1942 (age 83) Backergunge District, Bengal Province, British India
- Party: JP(Z)
- Spouse: Jaushan Ara Begum (d. 2018)

Mostafa Jamal Haider is a Bangladeshi politician affiliated with the Jatiya Party who served the Pirojpur-1 district as a member of the Jatiya Sangsad from 1986 to 1991. He is the current chairman of the Jatiya Party (Zafar).

== Early life and career ==
Mostafa Jamal Haider was born on 10 December 1942 in Pirojpur District.

Haider was elected to parliament from Pirojpur-1 as a Jatiya Party candidate in 1986 and 1988.
