= Waz Mahfil =

Islamic preaching event in Bangladesh

Waz Mahfil (alias: Waz, or Tafsir-ul-Quran Mahfil) is a traditional Islamic preaching event in Bangladesh that combines the Arabic words 'waz', meaning "giving advice", and 'mahfil', meaning "gathering". It is a gathering of Muslim devotees and common listeners for sermons on Islam, has long been one of the primary means of preaching Islam in Bangladesh. Waz Mahfils are typically held in open spaces, such as playgrounds, paddy fields, street corners, or public grounds, and usually last from evening until midnight. It is the most popular medium of discussing teachings of Islam and Tafsir in the subcontinent especially in Bangladesh. However, apart from preaching Islam through Waz Mahfil, various political, social and contemporary issues of the country are also discussed here. Ibrahim Ali Tashna is regarded as the founder of Waz Mahfil (previously known as Islamic Jalsa) in the country. In 1906, he organized Islamic Jalsa or Waz Mahfil in the open ground to spread Islamic knowledge among the common people. Thousands of people from far and wide used to attend the event he introduced. The news of this new type of event spread quickly in Sylhet and Assam region as a result, Waz Mahfil started being organized in different places.

== Introduction ==
Mahfil has long been one of the primary means of preaching Islam in Bangladesh. Waz is originally an Arabic word meaning “giving advice” on what to do and what not to do about Islamic culture and practices, while the Arabic word Mahfil denotes assembly, gathering, meeting, or congregation. Waz Mahfil is usually held in tents erected in the open space, either in playgrounds or paddy fields after harvest in rural areas or at street corners and public grounds in cities, especially during winter. It usually begins in the evening and continues until midnight. Several speakers, who are usually called Mufassir (an Arabic term meaning somebody who can authoritatively interpret the Qur'an) or Ulama, speak one after the other. The chief speaker for the day speaks last. The speakers are seated, together with guests of honors from socio-political leadership, on a slightly elevated stage. The male congregation assembles on the ground in front of the stage, which is covered with mats made out of bamboo, cotton, or rarely, straw. The female congregation is kept in different tents separated by a curtain from the male congregation. The size of the audience varies, depending on the popularity of the speakers, from several hundred to hundreds of thousands.

== History ==
Waz has a long history in Islamic culture. Muhammad used to do Waz in front of his companions and ever since it has been a culture in Muslim societies around the world to spread Islamic education. Waz Mahfil became a “regular feature of Muslim social life" in the late nineteenth century in the Indian subcontinent, particularly in Bengali Muslim society. Waz Mahfil a peaceful religious assembly or meeting as opposed to the gathering or meeting called bahas, where a fierce debate is held between two or more groups on a contentious religious issue. In the late nineteenth century, Waz Mahfil was a significant break with the tradition of bahas. The Waz Mahfil became popular in the late nineteenth century in the Bengal and played an effective medium of communication with the masses in rural areas. Even the politicians joined the campaign to use this unique medium of mass communication. Since the early 1980s, Waz Mahfil has become a forum of commentary on current affairs and thus more centered on ideology than on theology. Initially, such congregations were usually organized by various mosques, madrasahs, and other religious institutions, like orphanages run by Islamic groups, ostensibly to raise funds for the particular institutions. But in the 1990s, various socio-Islamic organizations floated in the country organized such Waz Mahfil once a year, preferably during the winter. The attendees of a Waz Mahfil are stimulated by the cultural construct of religion and these Waz Mahfil have emerged to be the most authoritative sources of the interpretation of Islam and its relevance in daily lives, creating an enormous influence of the medium on Bangladeshi culture and society. Bangladesh's biggest Islam-based political party Bangladesh Jamaat-e-Islami's senior leader late Allama Delwar Hossain Sayeedi – a former parliamentarian was the most well-known speaker of Waz Mahfil in Bangladesh. He single-handedly transformed the nature of Waz Mahfil and gave it a socio-political significance in the 1980s and 1990s and through this medium helped popularize "political Islam" in Bangladesh.

Waz Mahfil was not exclusively meant for the propagation of religious ideals, rather the medium used by the Islamic leaders, politicians, and social leaders to encourage modern education. Waz Mahfil was considered as one kind of pedagogical theatre where preachers teach the audience through scenes and gestures. While Waz Mahfil is a dominant feature in the Bangladeshi preaching landscape, the social meaning of Waz Mahfil in Bangladesh has gone far beyond the sermon. as it is manipulated for outright political mobilization, with preachers seen seeking vote for particular parties and speaking against particular parties in Waz Mahfil in Bangladesh.
