= Pirojpur Stadium =

Cricket Stadium in Bangladesh

Coordinates: 22°34′42.39″N 89°59′00.23″E

- Interactive map of Pirojpur Stadium
- Location: Pirojpur, Bangladesh
- Owner: National Sports Council
- Operator: National Sports Council
- Surface: Grass

Tenants
- Pirojpur Cricket Team; Pirojpur Football Team

Pirojpur Stadium is a cricket stadium located by the Pirojpur Fire Service in Pirojpur, Bangladesh. The stadium is often used as helipad for landing important people of Bangladesh.

== See also ==
- Stadiums in Bangladesh
- List of cricket grounds in Bangladesh
- Sport in Bangladesh
- Cricket in Bangladesh
- List of historic Bangladesh military aircraft
- Bangladesh Army Stadium
