= Eunus Ali Sarkar =

Bangladeshi politician (1953–2019)

Member of Parliament for Gaibandha-3
- In office 5 January 2014 – 27 December 2019
- Preceded by: TIM Fazle Rabbi Chowdhury
- Succeeded by: Umme Kulsum Smrity

Personal details
- Born: 15 June 1953
- Died: 27 December 2019 (aged 66) Dhaka, Bangladesh
- Party: Bangladesh Awami League
- Education: Rangpur Medical College

Eunus Ali Sarkar (15 June 1953 – 27 December 2019) was a Bangladesh Awami League politician who served as a Jatiya Sangsad member representing the Gaibandha-3 constituency.

== Early life ==
Sarkar was born on 15 June 1953. He completed his M.B.B.S. from Rangpur Medical College.

== Career ==
Sarkar was elected to parliament on 5 January 2014 from Gaibandha-3 as a Bangladesh Awami League candidate. In 2016, he asked the government to provide Eid bonus for members of parliament.

== Death ==
Sarkar died on 27 December 2019 from lung cancer at the age of 66 at Bangabandhu Sheikh Mujib Medical University hospital, Dhaka.
