= TIM Fazle Rabbi Chowdhury =

Bangladeshi politician (1934–2018)

Fazle Rabbi Chowdhury

Member of Jatiya Sangsad
- In office 7 May 1986 – 15 February 1996
- Succeeded by: Mukhlesur Rahman
- Constituency: Gaibandha-3
- In office 12 June 1996 – 14 January 2014
- Preceded by: Mukhlesur Rahman
- Succeeded by: Eunus Ali Sarkar

3rd Chief Whip of Parliament
- In office 10 July 1986 – 6 December 1987
- Speaker: Shamsul Huda Chowdhury
- Preceded by: Abul Hasanat
- Succeeded by: M. A. Sattar

Personal details
- Born: 1 October 1934 Gaibandha, Bengal Province
- Died: 20 December 2018 (aged 84) United Hospital, Dhaka, Bangladesh
- Party: Jatiya Party (Ershad) (1986-2001); Islami Jatiya Oikya Front (2001–2006); Jatiya Party (Ershad) (2006-2013); Jatiya Party (Zafar) (2013-2017); Jatiya Oikya Front (2018)

Fazle Rabbi Chowdhury (Bengali: ফজলে রাব্বি চৌধুরী; 1 October 1934 – 20 December 2018) was a Bangladeshi politician from Gaibandha who was a member of parliament for six terms. As an advisor to President Hussain Mohammad Ershad, he represented the Jatiya Party for most of his lifetime.

== Early life ==
Chowdhury was born on 1 October 1934, to a Bengali Muslim family of Chowdhuries from the village of Taluqzamira in Harinathpur, Palashbari under Gaibandha (formerly part of Rangpur District) in Bengal Province. He earned a M.Sc. and a PhD.

== Career ==
Chowdhury was elected to parliament from Gaibandha-3 in 1986, 1988, 1991, and 1996 as a candidate of Jatiya Party (Ershad). He was elected in 2001 as a candidate of Islami Jatiya Oikya Front and in 2008 as a candidate of Jatiya Party (Ershad). He was an advisor to President Hussain Mohammad Ershad. He worked as a professor at the Bangladesh Agricultural University. In 2015, he was the acting chairperson of Jatiya Party. He later joined the Jatiya Party faction led by Kazi Zafar Ahmed. After Ahmed's death in 2015, Chowdhury became the chairman of the faction until his own death.

== Death ==
Chowdhury died on 20 December 2018 in United Hospital, Dhaka.
