= A. K. M. A. Awal Saydur Rahman =

Bangladesh Awami League politician

A. K. M. A. Awal
- এ. কে. এম. এ. আউয়াল

Member of the Bangladesh Parliament for Pirojpur-1
- In office 25 January 2009 – 29 October 2018
- Preceded by: Delwar Hossain Sayeedi
- Succeeded by: SM Rezaul Karim

Personal details
- Born: 3 March 1954 (age 71)
- Political party: Bangladesh Awami League
- Spouse: Laila Parvin

A. K. M. A. Awal Saydur Rahman (known as AKMA Awal; born 3 March 1954) is a Bangladesh Awami League politician and a former Jatiya Sangsad member representing the Pirojpur-1 constituency during 2009–2018. As of September 2020, he has been serving as the president of the Pirojpur district Awami League branch.

== Early life ==
Awal studied up to H.S.C.

== Career ==
Awal was elected to the parliament from Pirojpur-1 in 2008 and re-elected on 5 January 2014 as a Bangladesh Awami League candidate. In January 2012, he testified against Delwar Hossain Sayedee at the International Crimes Tribunal.

=== Corruption charges ===
On 30 December 2019, the Anti-Corruption Commission (ACC) filed three cases against Awal. In the first case, he, along with his wife, Laila Parvin, took lease of a government land using fake documents and built a three-storied building on it. In the second case, he was accused of illegally grabbing another land and built a bungalow in Swarupkati Upazila. The third case accused him of grabbing a 44 decimal pond known as Rajar Pukur in Pirojpur town and erecting a boundary wall to keep it in his possession. They took interim bail from the High Court on 7 January 2020. On 3 March, a Pirojpur court ordered to send Awal and Parvin to jail after rejecting their bail prayer. But the court reversed the ruling four hours later and granted the bail. Meanwhile, District and Sessions judge, Md. Abdul Mannan, was stand released on the charges of corruption. On 21 September, the Pirojpur court extended the bail for another month.

In January 2021, a Senior Special Judge's Court of Dhaka ordered ACC to freeze 18 bank accounts and seize documents of 40 scheduled immovable properties of Awal and Parvin. The order was upheld by a High Court bench on 25 May.

In April 2023, charges was framed against Awal and Parvin in all three cases filed by ACC. Judge Mehdi Al Masud of the Barisal Divisional Special District Judge Court formed this complaint.
