= Abul Kawsar Mohammad Nazrul Islam =

Bangladeshi politician

- আবুল কাওছার মোহাম্মদ নজরুল ইসলাম

Member of the Bangladesh Parliament for Gaibandha-3
- Incumbent
- Assumed office 17 February 2026
- Preceded by: Umme Kulsum Smrity

Personal details
- Born: 1 March 1961 (age 65) Palashbari, Bangladesh
- Party: Bangladesh Jamaat-e-Islami

Abul Kawsar Mohammad Nazrul Islam is a Bangladeshi politician of the Bangladesh Jamaat-e-Islami. He is currently serving as a member of parliament from Gaibandha-3.

== Early life ==
Islam was born on 1 March 1961 in Palashbari Upazila under Gaibandha District.
