= Gaibandha-3 =

Bangladeshi parliamentary constituency

Coordinates: 25.39°N 89.47°E

- Constituency for the Jatiya Sangsad
- District: Gaibandha District
- Division: Rangpur Division
- Electorate: 506,185 (2026)

Current constituency
- Created: 1984
- Party: Bangladesh Jamaat-e-Islami
- Member: Abul Kawsar Mohammad Nazrul Islam
- ← 30 Gaibandha-2 32 Gaibandha-4 →

Gaibandha-3 is a constituency represented in the Jatiya Sangsad (National Parliament) of Bangladesh since 2026 by Abul Kawsar Mohammad Nazrul Islam of the Bangladesh Jamaat-e-Islami.

== Boundaries ==
The constituency encompasses Palashbari and Sadullapur upazilas.

== History ==
The constituency was created in 1984 from a Rangpur constituency when the former Rangpur District was split into five districts: Nilphamari, Lalmonirhat, Rangpur, Kurigram, and Gaibandha.

== Members of Parliament ==
| Election | Member | Party |
|---|---|---|
| 1986 | Fazle Rabbi Chowdhury | Jatiya Party |
| Feb 1996 | Mukhlesur Rahman | Bangladesh Nationalist Party |
| Jun 1996 | Fazle Rabbi Chowdhury | Jatiya Party |
| 2001 | Fazle Rabbi Chowdhury | Islami Jatiya Oikya Front |
| 2008 | Fazle Rabbi Chowdhury | Jatiya Party (Ershad) |
| 2014 | Eunus Ali Sarkar | Awami League |
| 2020 by-election | Umme Kulsum Smriti | Awami League |
| 2026 | Abul Kawsar Mohammad Nazrul Islam | Bangladesh Jamaat-e-Islami |

== Elections ==
=== Elections in the 2020s ===
General Election 2026: Gaibandha-3
| Party | Candidate | Votes | % | ±% |
|---|---|---|---|---|
| Jamaat | Abul Kawsar Mohammad Nazrul Islam | 162,457 | 52.0 | N/A |
| BNP | Syed Mainul Hasan Sadiq | 139,864 | 44.7 | N/A |
| IAB | Md. ATM Awlad Hossain | 2,835 | 0.9 | N/A |
| Independent | SM Khademul Islam Khudi | 2,045 | 0.7 | N/A |
| GOP | Md. Suruj Mia | 1,792 | 0.6 | N/A |
| JP(E) | Mainur Rabbi Chowdhury | 1,638 | 0.5 | N/A |
| Independent | Md. Azizar Rahman | 1,142 | 0.4 | N/A |
| CPB | Md. Abdullah Adil | 521 | 0.2 | N/A |
| Janotar Dol | Md. Manjurul Haque | 158 | 0.1 | N/A |
| IBB | Md. Mosaddiqul Islam | 147 | 0.0 | N/A |
| Majority | | 22,593 | 7.2 | N/A |
| Turnout | | 312,599 | 61.8 | N/A |
| Jamaat gain from AL | | | | |

=== Elections in the 2010s ===
The Bangladesh Nationalist Party (BNP) candidate, TIM Fazle Rabbi Chowdhury, died ten days before the 30 December 2018 general election. Voting in the constituency was postponed until 27 January 2019. The BNP selected Moinul Hasan Sadik to run in his place.

General Election 2014: Gaibandha-3
| Party | Candidate | Votes | % | ±% |
|---|---|---|---|---|
| AL | Eunus Ali Sarkar | 127,563 | 86.3 | N/A |
| Independent | SM Khademul Islam Khudi | 18,204 | 12.3 | N/A |
| Jatiya Party (M) | Fazle Karim Ahmed Pallab | 1,992 | 1.3 | N/A |
| Majority | | 109,359 | 74.0 | +37.8 |
| Turnout | | 147,759 | 40.0 | −46.8 |
| AL gain from JP(E) | | | | |

=== Elections in the 2000s ===
General Election 2008: Gaibandha-3
| Party | Candidate | Votes | % | ±% |
|---|---|---|---|---|
| JP(E) | TIM Fazle Rabbi Chowdhury | 179,095 | 63.2 | N/A |
| Jamaat | Abul Kowser Mohammad Nazrul Islam | 76,460 | 27.0 | −1.6 |
| Independent | Eunus Ali Sarkar | 27,581 | 9.7 | N/A |
| BKA | Md. Kholilur Rahman | 425 | 0.1 | N/A |
| Majority | | 102,635 | 36.2 | +30.1 |
| Turnout | | 283,561 | 86.8 | +9.2 |
| JP(E) gain from IJOF | | | | |

General Election 2001: Gaibandha-3
| Party | Candidate | Votes | % | ±% |
|---|---|---|---|---|
| IJOF | TIM Fazle Rabbi Chowdhury | 91,109 | 37.8 | N/A |
| AL | Eunus Ali Sarkar | 76,439 | 31.7 | +4.5 |
| Jamaat | Nazrul Islam | 69,022 | 28.6 | +11.4 |
| Jatiya Party (M) | Fazle Karim Ahmed Pallab | 3,583 | 1.5 | N/A |
| Ganatantri Party | Ganesh Prasad | 573 | 0.2 | N/A |
| Independent | Md. Khairul Alam | 312 | 0.1 | N/A |
| Majority | | 14,670 | 6.1 | −15.0 |
| Turnout | | 241,038 | 77.6 | +6.3 |
| IJOF gain from JP(E) | | | | |

=== Elections in the 1990s ===
General Election June 1996: Gaibandha-3
| Party | Candidate | Votes | % | ±% |
|---|---|---|---|---|
| JP(E) | TIM Fazle Rabbi Chowdhury | 85,027 | 48.3 | +7.2 |
| AL | Md. Nazrul Islam | 47,937 | 27.2 | N/A |
| Jamaat | Nazrul Islam | 30,264 | 17.2 | −6.2 |
| BNP | Shah Badrul Islam | 9,121 | 5.2 | +1.8 |
| WPB | Md. Jakaria Khandakar | 1,133 | 0.6 | N/A |
| IOJ | Md. Entanz Ali | 1,121 | 0.6 | N/A |
| CPB | Md. Zahedur Rahman | 887 | 0.5 | N/A |
| Zaker Party | Md. Moazzem Hossain | 600 | 0.3 | −0.5 |
| Majority | | 37,090 | 21.1 | +8.8 |
| Turnout | | 176,090 | 71.3 | +15.9 |
| JP(E) hold | | | | |

General Election 1991: Gaibandha-3
| Party | Candidate | Votes | % | ±% |
|---|---|---|---|---|
| JP(E) | TIM Fazle Rabbi Chowdhury | 56,869 | 41.1 | |
| BAKSAL | Abu Taleb Mia | 39,872 | 28.8 | |
| Jamaat | Nazrul Islam | 32,337 | 23.4 | |
| BNP | R. A. Gani | 4,675 | 3.4 | |
| Zaker Party | Md. Moazzem Hossain | 1,126 | 0.8 | |
| Independent | Azgar Ali Khan | 816 | 0.6 | |
| Independent | Abdul Momin Chawdhury | 682 | 0.5 | |
| Independent | Md. Muslem Uddin Khandakar | 487 | 0.4 | |
| Independent | Md. Nazrul Islam | 454 | 0.3 | |
| FP | Md. Mia Saikat Asgar | 388 | 0.3 | |
| NAP (Muzaffar) | Nurul Haq Mondol | 310 | 0.2 | |
| Jatiya Samajtantrik Dal-JSD | Md. Abul Khaer | 242 | 0.2 | |
| Majority | | 16,997 | 12.3 | |
| Turnout | | 138,258 | 55.4 | |
| JP(E) hold | | | | |
