= Mukhlesur Rahman =

Bangladeshi politician

- মোখলেছুর রহমান

Member of Parliament for Gaibandha-3
- In office 15 February 1996 – 12 June 1996
- Preceded by: TIM Fazle Rabbi Chowdhury
- Succeeded by: TIM Fazle Rabbi Chowdhury

Personal details
- Born: Gaibandha
- Party: Bangladesh Nationalist Party

Mukhlesur Rahman is a Bangladesh Nationalist Party politician. He was elected a member of parliament from Gaibandha-3 in February 1996.

== Career ==
Mukhlesur was elected to parliament from Gaibandha-3 as a Bangladesh Nationalist Party candidate in the 15 February 1996 Bangladeshi general election.
