= Umme Kulsum Smrity =

Bangladeshi politician

- উম্মে কুলসুম স্মৃতি

Member of the Bangladesh Parliament for Gaibandha-3
- In office 21 March 2020 – 6 August 2024
- Preceded by: Eunus Ali Sarkar
- Succeeded by: Abul Kawsar Mohammad Nazrul Islam

Personal details
- Born: 1 January 1963 (age 63)
- Party: Bangladesh Awami League

Umme Kulsum Smrity (born 1 January 1963) is a Bangladesh Awami League politician and a former Jatiya Sangsad member representing the Gaibandha-3 constituency during 2020–2024.

== Early life ==
Smrity was born on 1 January 1963. She graduated with a law degree.

== Career ==
Smrity was elected to parliament from a reserved seat as a Bangladesh Awami League candidate in 2014. She is the general secretary of the Central Committee of Bangladesh Krishak League. She was elected to parliament from Gaibandha-3 in a by-election on 21 March 2020.
