= Baithakata =

Baithakata বৈঠাকাটা Mugarjhor
- Village
- Location in Bangladesh
- Coordinates: 22°47′12.2″N 89°58′52.9″E
- Country: Bangladesh
- Division: Barisal
- District: Pirojpur
- Upazila: Nazirpur
- Union Council: Malikhali
- Time zone: UTC+6 (Bangladesh Time)
- Postal code: 8541
- Area code: +880-461

Baithakata (Bengali: বৈঠাকাটা), also known as Mugarjhor, is a village in Pirojpur District in the Barisal Division of southwestern Bangladesh.

== Geography ==
The village is part of the union council of Malikhali and lies near the eastern shore of Kaliganga River. It is 10 km north of Nazirpur, 80 km west of Barisal and 100 km east of Khulna.

== Education ==
In the village there are the Mugarjhor High School and the Baithakata College.
