= Pirojpur Science and Technology University =

Public university in Bangladesh

- পিরোজপুর বিজ্ঞান প্রযুক্তি বিশ্ববিদ্যালয়
- Other name: PrSTU
- Type: Public
- Established: 2022 (4 years ago)
- Affiliations: UGC
- Chancellor: President Mirza Fakhrul Islam Alamgir
- Vice-Chancellor: Mohammad Sabirul Islam Hawlader
- Students: 480
- Location: Pirojpur, Bangladesh
- Campus: Semi Urban, 75 acres (30 ha) proposed
- Language: English, Bengali
- Colors: green, White
- Website: prstu

Pirojpur Science and Technology University

Pirojpur Science and Technology University is a public university in Pirojpur District, Bangladesh. It is the third public university in Barisal Division after University of Barishal and Patuakhali Science and Technology University. It was established in 2022 by the Pirojpur Science and Technology University act in National Parliament of Bangladesh.

== History ==
To the desire of the prime minister of Bangladesh To establish a university in every district of Bangladesh, this university was established in Pirojpur District. The University Act was passed in the National Parliament in 2022.

The University Grants Commission allowed the university to commence instruction in the 2023–2024 academic year with up to 40 students in each of four subjects: computer science and engineering, mathematics, statistics, and psychology.

After the fall of the Sheikh Hasina led Awami League government, Bangabandhu Sheikh Mujibur Rahman Science and Technology University was renamed to Pirojpur Science and Technology University.

== See also ==
- List of universities in Bangladesh
