= Momin Mosque =

Mosque in Phirojpur, Bangladesh

- মমিন মসজিদ
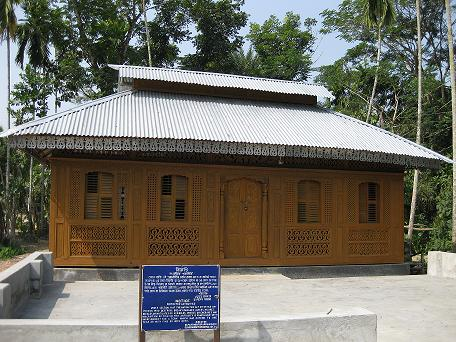
- The mosque in 2008, following restoration

- Location of the mosque in Bangladesh

Religion
- Affiliation: Islam
- Ecclesiastical or organisational status: Mosque
- Ownership: Moulovi Momin Uddin Akon
- Status: Active

Location
- Location: Burirchar, Mathbaria Upazila, Pirojpur District
- Country: Bangladesh
- Administration: Department of Archaeology
- Coordinates: 22°22′59″N 89°56′34″E

Architecture
- Architect: Moulovi Momin Uddin Akon
- Type: Mosque architecture
- Groundbreaking: 1913
- Completed: 1920; 2008 (renovation)

Specifications
- Capacity: 30 to 100 worshipers
- Interior area: 7.3 m × 5.5 m (24 ft × 18 ft)
- Height (max): 7.0 m (23 ft)
- Inscriptions: Two
- Materials: Timber; tin (roof)

The Momin Mosque (Bengali: মমিন মসজিদ, Arabic: مسجد مؤمن) is a mosque located in Burirchar, Mathbaria Upazila, in the Pirojpur District of Bangladesh. The mosque is made of wood and structured without nails by woodworkers and calligraphers. The woodworks are arranged in geometric balance and painted with natural colors. A philanthropist in the village of Burirchar, Momin Uddin Akon, started building this mosque in 1913 by employing twenty-one artisans, and it took seven years to complete the work. In 2003, the Bangladeshi Department of Archaeology designated the mosque as a national heritage and listed it under the name Momin Mosque for preservation. Restoration work on the mosque began in 2008.

== History ==
Momin Uddin Akon decided to build a mosque because of the distance he had to travel to perform his daily prayers. He visited mosques across Bangladesh to study their architecture and design. Initially, he began constructing the mosque with bricks made in his backyard. However, he later opted to use wood to harmonize with the wooden houses in the surrounding village. The mosque is decorated with carved and painted images of leaves, flowers, and fruits, including pineapples.

Akon employed twenty-two artisans, mainly from the Swarupkati area in Barisal district, and sourced wood from Chittagong and Myanmar. Momin Uddin Akon personally directed all aspects of the plans, layouts, designs, colors, and calligraphy. Construction commenced in 1913 and was completed in approximately seven years.

In the late twentieth century, the woodwork suffered deterioration of colour and structural integrity due to extensive rain. To help preserve the mosque, Mohammad Shahidullah, grandson of Momin Uddin Akon, wrote articles and later published a book, Momin Mosque - Smriti Bismritir Katha, to raise awareness.

In 2003, the mosque was designated a national heritage site and listed as Momin Mosque under the "Antiquities Act 1976" by the Directorate of Archaeology.

== Architecture ==
The architecture of the Momin Mosque stands apart from the more common styles of the Mughal, Parthian, and Sassanian. Constructed from wood without the use of nails, it features a four-sided pitch roof, or chouchala, covered with corrugated iron sheets. The central part of the roof is elevated to facilitate ventilation by fresh air. This raised apex is topped by a dochala, a two-sided pitch roof.

The Momin Mosque is an oblong-shaped prayer hall measuring 7.47 by 3.55 metres (24.5 by 11.6 ft), with 15-centimetre-thick (5.9 in) wooden walls. The hall is accessed from the east through a double-leaved door. Corresponding to the frontal opening, the qibla wall features a rectangular projected space, serving as a mihrab. This mihrab is supported by a flat wooden arch on two posts. The prayer hall is built on a high plinth, and the floor is finished with neat cement over the original stone. Six five-inch square wooden posts on each longer side and three posts on each shorter side support the roof frame.

One of two inscriptions with calligraphic designs is placed above the main entrance, and the other is fixed over the mihrab. Information regarding the construction period is carved into the frontal inscription in the Bengali and is located on the right-hand side of the entrance.

Ventilation was a key consideration in the wall's design. The peripheral wall is divided vertically into three sections. The lower and upper parts are covered by fixed perforated wooden screens or panels with various designs. The middle section contains two types of windows: pivotal and swing, both operated from the inside. There are four swing windows on the longer sides and two on each shorter side. The space between the windows features a fixed panel on the outside and a pivotal panel on the inside.

All structural posts, purlins, and rafters are made of Loha kath, also known as iron wood, while Burmese teak was used for paneling and ornamentation. The wooden surfaces were originally painted with different colours, but only yellow has been used during the restoration process.

== See also ==
- Islam in Bangladesh
- List of mosques in Bangladesh
