= Sudhangshu Shekhar Haldar =

Bangladeshi politician

- সুধাংশু শেখর হালদার

Member of Parliament for Pirojpur-1
- In office 5 March 1991 – 24 November 1995
- Preceded by: Mostafa Jamal Haider
- Succeeded by: Gazi Nuruzzaman Babul

Member of Parliament for Bakerganj-14 (extinct)
- In office 2 April 1979 – 24 March 1982

Personal details
- Died: 29 September 2004 Dhaka, Bangladesh
- Party: Bangladesh Awami League

Sudhangshu Shekhar Haldar (died on 29 September 2004) was a Bangladesh Awami League politician. He was elected a member of parliament in 1979 and 1991 from Pirojpur-1.

== Career ==
Haldar was elected a member of parliament in 1979 from Bakerganj-14 (extinct). He was elected to member of parliament from Pirojpur-1 in 1991.
