= Bangladesh National Hindu Grand Alliance =

- বাংলাদেশ জাতীয় হিন্দু মহাজোট; Bangladesh Jatiya Hindu Mohajote
- Abbreviation: BJHM or BNHGA
- Formation: September 17, 2006; 19 years ago
- Type: Social and religious organisation
- Legal status: Active
- Purpose: Consolidate the Hindu society, protect and serve Hinduism within Bangladesh
- Headquarters: Dhaka, Bangladesh
- Chairman: Prabhas Chandra Ray
- Secretary General: Gobinda Chandra Pramanik

Bangladesh National Hindu Grand Alliance (abbreviation: BNHGA, in Bengali: বাংলাদেশ জাতীয় হিন্দু মহাজোট, romanised: Bāṅlādēś Jātiyō Hindu Môhājôte, abbreviation: BJHM), is a non-political, social Hindu religious organisation based in Bangladesh. It was formed as an alliance of 23 Hindu religious organisations of Bangladesh on 17 September 2006. BJHM's main objectives are to consolidate the Hindu community, protect and serve Hinduism and to realise the religious, social, cultural and political rights of the Hindu community in Bangladesh.

After the establishment of the National Hindu Grand Alliance, it has been invited and participated as a representative of the Hindu community of Bangladesh in various international conferences including the World Hindu Conference, World Hindu Congress which were held in different countries including the US and India. The current president of the alliance Dr. Prabhas Chandra Roy and Executive Secretary General and Spokesperson Gobinda Chandra Pramanik.

== History ==
The organisation is a grand alliance of 23 other Hindu religious organisations of Bangladesh, involving all several districts of the country. The alliance was established on 17 September 2006. The organisation also has a youth wing, the Jubo Mohajote (Youth Grand Alliance) and a student wing, the Chhatra Mahajote (Student Grand Alliance).

=== 7 point demand ===
On August 30, 2013, the organisation released a three-point demands list. Later, including these three points, an updated "seven point of demand" were announced on September 17, 2021. These demands included the establishment of a Ministry of Minority Development, reserved parliamentary seats for Hindus, reforming the Hindu Succession Act, and declaring more Hindu holidays as public holidays for Hindu worship.

In 2021, the organization demanded the construction of a model temple in every upazila, similar to how model mosques are built in every upazila in Bangladesh.

In August 2024, after the fall of the Awami League government in Bangladesh, the Secretary General Gobindo Chandra Pramanik criticised Indian media for "spreading fake news" regarding the vandalism of Hindu homes and temples in Bangladesh during the unrest that followed, asserting that such claims are bogus, and that Hindus in Bangladesh are safe, and any attacks that may have happened were politically motivated to Awami League politicians, regardless of religion, and not specifically towards Hindus.

== Affiliate organisations ==
- Bangladesh National Hindu Student Grand Alliance
- Bangladesh National Hindu Youth Grand Alliance
- Bangladesh Hindu Women Grand Alliance
- Bangladesh Hindu Volunteer Grand Alliance

== Controversy ==
Currently, according to Hindu Inheritance Law, if someone has a son, then the daughter does not inherit his property. But if there is no son, then the daughters who have sons get the share of the deceased person's property. The BJHM calls the Foundation for Humanity, an organisation which aims to change this law, "anti-Hindu religion and anti-sociality."

Apart from these, there are allegations against the BJHM of running a propaganda campaign against The Daily Star editor Mahfuz Anam and the "Hindu Law Enforcement Initiative" organisation.
