= Zianagar Upazila =

- Upazila
- Zianagar Upazila
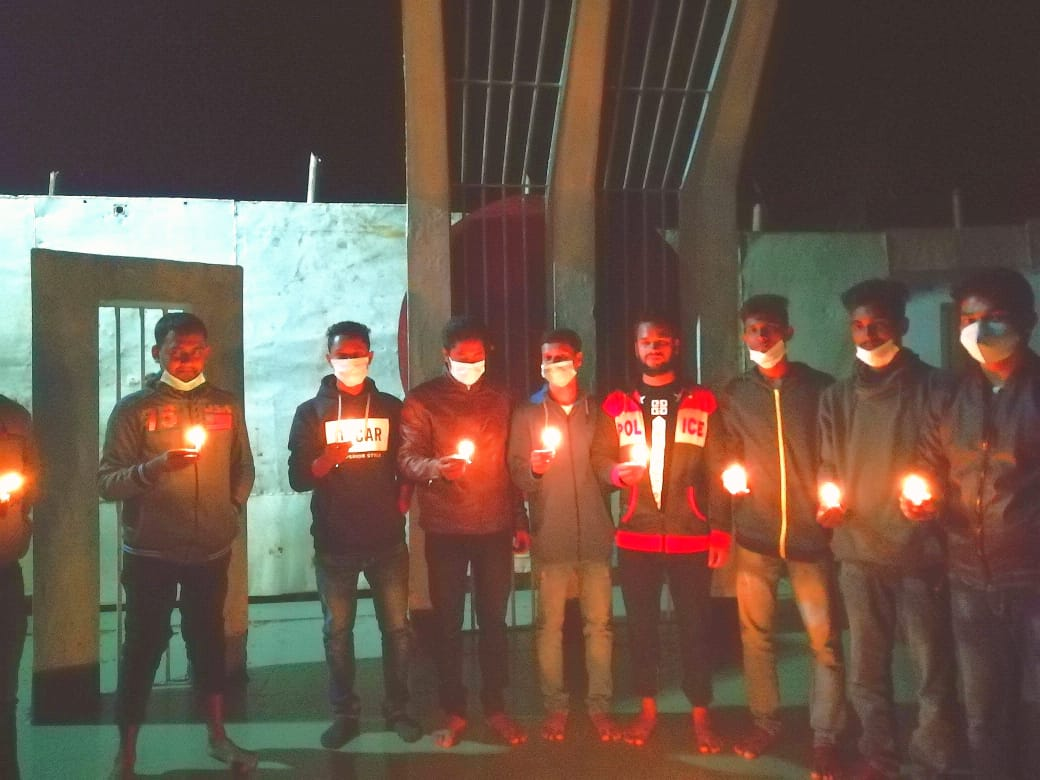
- 49th Indurkani Liberation Day, captured in Indurkani

- Coordinates: 22.4805°N 89.9604°E
- Country: Bangladesh
- Division: Barisal Division
- District: Pirojpur District

Area
  - Total: 94.59 km^{2} (36.52 sq mi)

Population (2022)
  - Total: 85,454
  - Density: 903.4/km^{2} (2,340/sq mi)
- Time zone: UTC+6 (BST)
- Postal code: 8502

Zianagar Upazila mauza geocode map

Indurkani, also known as Zianagar, is an upazila, or sub-district, of the Pirojpur District in Barisal Division, Bangladesh.

== History ==
Zianagar Upazila was liberated from Pakistani occupation on 2 December 1971 during the Bangladesh Liberation War. It was the first upazila in Pirojpur district to be freed from occupying forces.

During the war, Indurkani fell under Sector 9, with the Sundarbans Sub-Sector commanded by Major (Retd.) Ziauddin Ahmed. Liberation activities in the area were primarily concentrated around Parerhat Port and the adjacent market in Parerhat Union.

Pakistani forces entered Pirojpur on 4 May 1971. Following a series of joint operations by the Mukti Bahini and allied forces, the occupying troops withdrew from Parerhat Port on 2 December 1971, marking the complete liberation of Indurkani.

On 28 July 1980, President Ziaur Rahman turned Indurkani river police station into a full police station. On 21 April 2002, Prime Minister Begum Khaleda Zia renamed Indurkani into Zianagar Upazila. On 9 January 2017, the National Implementation Committee for Administrative Reform led by Prime Minister Sheikh Hasina renamed Zianagar Upazila back to Indurkani Upazila.

== Administration ==
UNO: Md. Abu Bakker Siddique.

Zianagar Upazila is divided into five union parishads: Indurkani Sadar, Chandipur, Balipara, Parerhat, and Pattashi. The union parishads are subdivided into 29 mauzas and 48 villages.

== Demographics ==
Religions in Indurkani Upazila (2022)
| Religion | Percent |
| Islam | 92.73% |
| Hinduism | 7.26% |
| Other or not stated | 0.01% |

According to the 2022 Bangladeshi census, Zianagar Upazila had 20,465 households and a population of 85,454. 10.09% of the population were under 5 years of age. Zianagar had a literacy rate (age 7 and over) of 81.26%: 80.54% for males and 81.92% for females, and a sex ratio of 94.18 males for every 100 females. 6,906 (8.08%) lived in urban areas.

According to the 2011 Census of Bangladesh, Zianagar Upazila had 17,199 households and a population of 77,217. 18,847 (24.41%) were under 10 years of age. Zianagar has a literacy rate (age 7 and over) of 61.2%, compared to the national average of 51.8%, and a sex ratio of 1036 females per 1000 males. 6,069 (7.86%) lived in urban areas.
