= Pirojpur =

Pirojpur পিরোজপুর
- Town & District headquarter
- Location in Bangladesh Pirojpur (Bangladesh)
- Coordinates: 22.578°N 89.968°E
- Country: Bangladesh
- Division: Barisal
- District: Pirojpur

Area
  - Total: 29.50 km^{2} (11.39 sq mi)

Population (2011)
  - Total: 60,056
  - Density: 2,036/km^{2} (5,273/sq mi)
- Time zone: UTC+6 (BST)
- Website: pirojpurmunicipality.org.bd

Pirojpur (Bengali: পিরোজপুর) is a town in Pirojpur district in Barisal Division in southern Bangladesh. It is the administrative headquarters and the largest town of Pirojpur district. The town covers an area of 29.50 square kilometres (11.39 sq mi) with a population of 78,057 as of the 2011 census. It also houses Pirojpur Cricket Stadium which is also used as a helipad for landing important people of Bangladesh.

== Demographics ==
Religions in Pirojpur (2011)
Religion	Percent
Islam	82.54%
Hinduism	17.44%
Other or not stated	0.02%

At the time of the 2011 census, Pirojpur had 13,646 households and a population of 60,056. 11,515 (19.17%) were under 10 years of age. Pirojpur has a sex ratio of 999 females per 1000 males and a literacy rate of 77.81%.

== Education ==
- Pirojpur Science and Technology University
- Government Suhrawardi College
- Pirojpur Government High School
- Dakshin Gabtala High School
- Pirojpur Government Girls College
