= Jewel Aich =

Bangladeshi stage magician (born 1950)

- জুয়েল আইচ
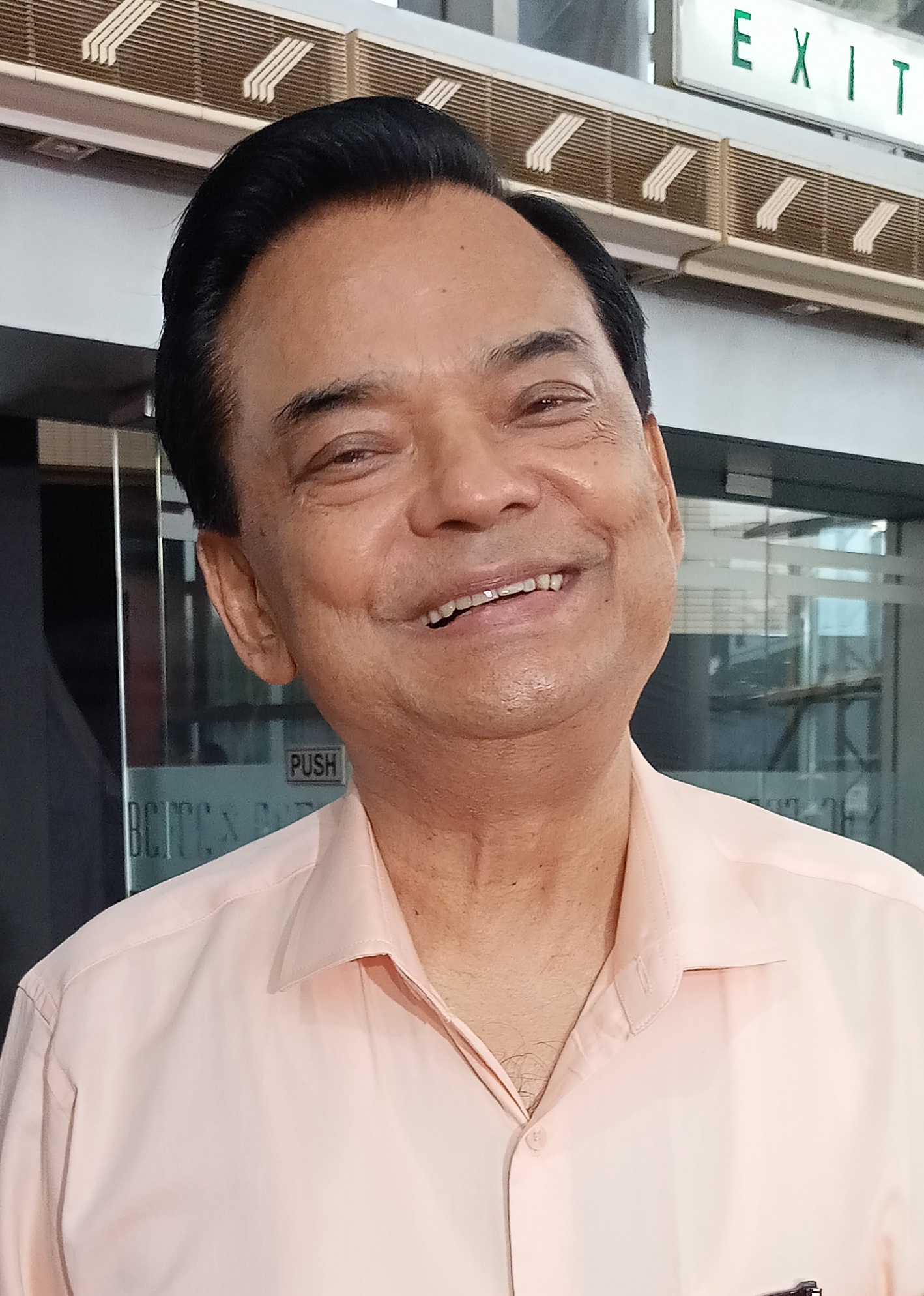
- Aich in 2025
- Born: 10 April 1950 (age 76); Pirojpur, East Bengal, Pakistan
- Education: Jagannath University (B.A.)
- Occupations: Magician and flautist
- Spouse: Bipasha Aich (née Pasha Khoshnu)
- Children: 1
- Awards: Ekushey Padak

Jewel Aich (born 10 April 1950) is a Bangladeshi magician and bansuri player. He is a veteran of the Bangladesh Liberation War.

== Personal life ==
Aich was born in Shomdekathi, East Bengal (present-day Barisal District, Bangladesh), the fifth of nine children born to Indian businessman Bijoy Kumar (B.K.) Aich and Saraju Aich, a homemaker. He became interested in magic and choreography early in his life. His interest grew after a Romani man performed a magic and dance routine during a visit to Aich's family home. On 23 July 1985, Aich married Pasha Khoshnu, daughter of Professor Darbesh Ali Khan and a political science teacher at Dhaka University. After their wedding, Pasha Khoshnu became known as Bipasha Aich. The couple have one daughter, Kheya Aich, who has appeared onstage with her mother during Aich's performances.

=== Participation in the Liberation War ===
In 1971, after finishing his studies, Aich and his family participated in the Bangladesh Liberation War. While in Bahadurpur (Nadiya), West Bengal, India, at a freedom fighters' camp, he taught students in refugee camps. He also performed magic to entertain the children at the camp.

=== Origin of name ===
After the Liberation War, Aich began writing regularly for Kishore Bangla, a newspaper for young people. One young fan from Rajshahi would address him as "Jewel Aich" instead of "G.L. Aich." Finding this simpler than his own name, he received permission from his family before changing his name to Jewel Aich.

== Professional career ==
After seeing a Romani man perform magic during a visit to his village, Aich was immediately drawn to it. He later saw a circus performing in a nearby settlement and was impressed by a magician who appeared to cut off his assistant's neck. Inspired by the trick, he designed a special knife, which he later demonstrated to his friends by "cutting off" a friend's leg. Aich learned some tricks from fellow magician Abdur Rashid of the Lion Circus in Pirojpur. By the time he enrolled in college, he was already known in his district as an amateur magician.

=== TV appearance ===
In 1977, a Bangladeshi TV host, Abdullah Abu Syed, invited Aich to perform magic on his show, which was Aich's first appearance on television. He would subsequently appear in more television shows, such as Ananda Mela and Ityadi. Later, he created his own TV specials at Bangladesh Television (BTV); one of these, 'Anandamela, Magic World of Jewel Aich', was named Program of the Year.

== Music ==
Aich is also a flautist, having studied with Ustad Abdur Rahman, Profullo Masid, and his son Montu Masid. From 1973, he began playing flute on Dhaka Radio (Bangladesh), Kolkata Radio (India), Radio Beijing (China), Deutsche Welle (Germany), BBC (UK), and VOA (US).

== Awards ==
- Ekushey Padak (1993)
