= Ziauddin Ahmed (officer) =

Bangladeshi fighter

Personal details
- Born: 14 September 1950 Pirojpur, East Bengal, Pakistan
- Died: 28 July 2017 (aged 66) Mount Elizabeth Hospital, Singapore
- Party: Jatiyo Samajtantrik Dal; Bangladesh Awami League
- Spouse: Kaniz Mahmuda
- Profession: Military officer

Military service
- Allegiance: Bangladesh; Pakistan (before 1971)
- Branch/service: Pakistan Army (before 1971); Bangladesh Army
- Years of service: 1970 – 1976
- Rank: Major
- Unit: Punjab Regiment; East Bengal Regiment
- Commands: Sub-Commander of Sector - IX; 2IC of 1st East Bengal Regiment; 2IC of 6th East Bengal Regiment
- Battles/wars: Bangladesh Liberation War

Ziauddin Ahmed (14 September 1950 – 28 July 2017) was a war hero, freedom fighter, and sub-sector commander under Sector 9 of Mukti Bahini during the Bangladesh Liberation War in 1971.

Ziauddin was a witness in the Bangabandhu assassination case. He took part in the Day of Uprising of Soldier and People on 7 November 1975.

== Early life and education ==
Ziauddin was born at Parerhat village in Pirojpur District in 1950. His father, Aftabuddin Ahmed, was a chairman of Pirojpur municipality and founder of the then Pirojpur Awami League division.

Ziauddin Ahmed completed his higher secondary certificate from Pirojpur Government Shaheed Suhrawardy College. He was the Pirojpur Sub-Division Chhatra Union president in 1968.

== Career ==
Ahmed was commissioned as a second lieutenant in the 27th Punjabis of the Pakistan Army in 1970. He was serving in the army in the then West Pakistan when the Liberation War broke out in 1971.

Ahmed fled from Lahore, West Pakistan, in July 1971 and joined the Liberation War thereafter. He was appointed as commander of the Sundarbans sub-sector under sector 9. He is reputed to have run the most disciplined force during the war.

Ziauddin was a major in the Bangladesh Army in 1975. He was serving at the Directorate Forces Intelligence (DFI) during the brutal bloodbath of August 15, 1975. After the assassination of Sheikh Mujibur Rahman, he was relieved of his duty. Following the killing of Bangabandhu on August 15, Ziauddin joined the so-called Day of Uprising of Soldier and People (otherwise known as National Revolution and Solidarity Day) on November 7, the same year under the leadership of Col. Taher.

After 1975, he moved to Pirojpur and joined Jatiya Samajtantrik Dal. He started a non-political organisation, "Banchao Sundarban", to protect the wildlife sanctuary of Sundarban. Later, he stood for the Biplobi Sainik Sangshta (Revolutionary Sepoy's Organisation) in opposing the military rule and took shelter in the Sundarbans with his followers as part of the resistance. Ziaduddin was arrested in an army operation in the Sundarbans in 1976. Along with many other dissenting military officials and political leaders, he was sentenced to life imprisonment by a military court. In 1980, he was freed on presidential clemency. Ziauddin served as municipality chairman of Pirojpur municipality between 1989 and 1991. In 1996, he joined the Awami League and was an advisor to the Awami League's Pirojpur unit.

To eliminate bandits from the Sundarbans, Ziauddin formed an organisation of fishermen named the Dubla Fisherman Group, of which he was also the chairman. He was injured during a gun battle with the forest's bandits in 2013. Ziauddin also forged a non-political organization named 'Banchao Sundarban', as part of protecting the wildlife sanctuary of Sundarban.

== Personal life ==
Ziauddin Ahmed was a writer and a journalist. He married Kaniz Mahmuda and fathered four children. His nephew, Mainur Rahman, is serving in the Bangladesh army as a lieutenant general. He was nicknamed the 'Mukuthin Somrat' (crownless king) of the Sundarbans.

== Death ==
He had been suffering from liver ailments since 2015. He died at Singapore's Mount Elizabeth Hospital on 28 July 2017. He was given a state honour by the Bangladesh Army. He was buried at his family graveyard at Parerhat Road in Pirojpur.

== Authored book ==
- Muktijuddhe Sundarban.
