= Pirojpur Sadar Upazila =

Pirojpur Sadar পিরোজপুর সদর
- Upazila
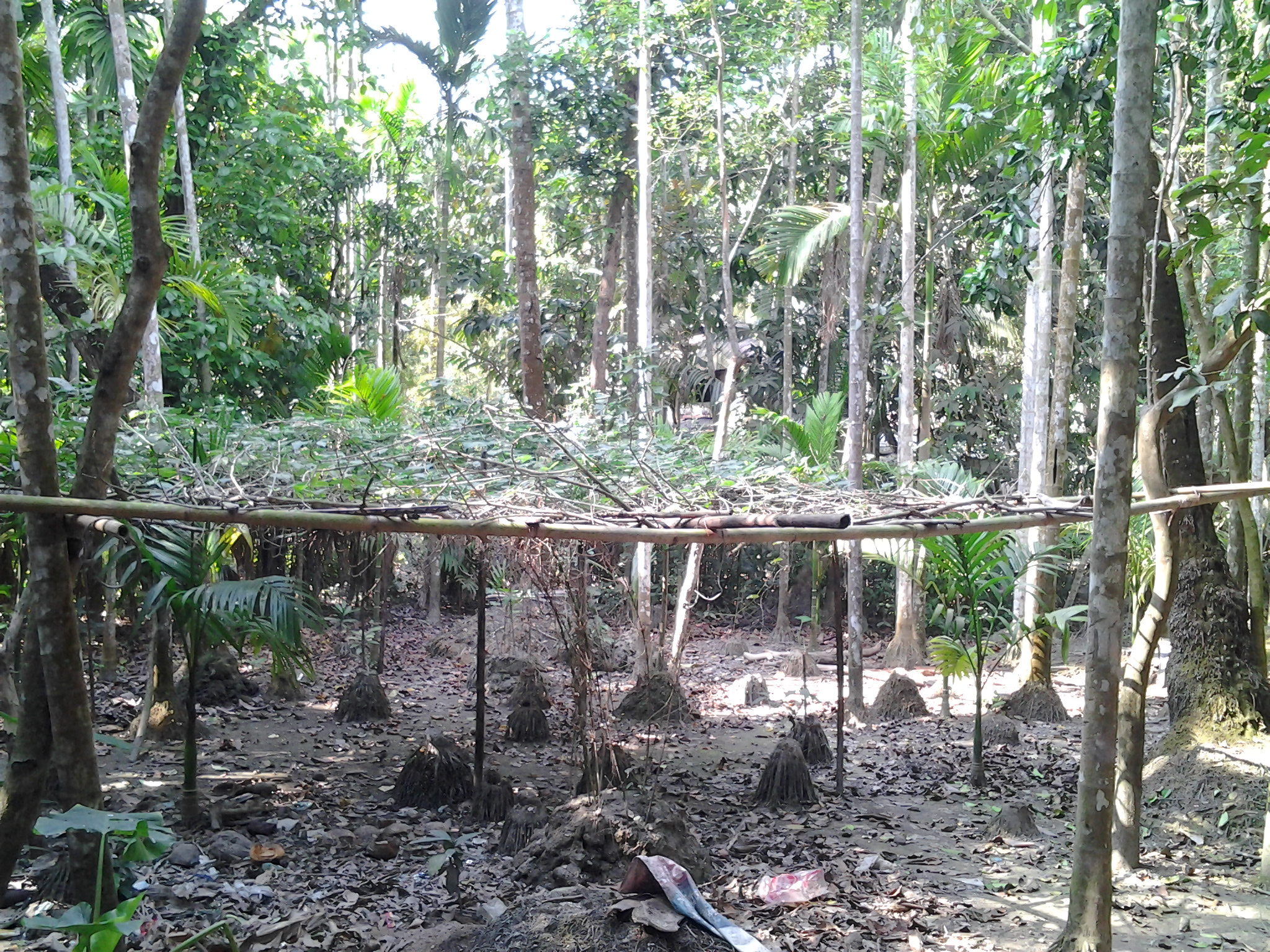
- Forest in Kalakhali

- Coordinates: 22°34.7′N 89°59.4′E
- Country: Bangladesh
- Division: Barisal
- District: Pirojpur
- Headquarters: Pirojpur

Area
  - Total: 166.81 km^{2} (64.41 sq mi)

Population (2022)
  - Total: 181,707
  - Density: 1,089.3/km^{2} (2,821.3/sq mi)
- Time zone: UTC+6 (BST)
- Postal code: 8500
- Area code: 0461
- Website: Official Map of the Pirojpur Sadar Upazila

Pirojpur Sadar Upazila mauza geocode map

Pirojpur Sadar (Bengali: পিরোজপুর সদর) is an upazila of Pirojpur District in Barisal, Bangladesh.

== Geography ==
Pirojpur Sadar is located at 22.5778°N 89.9900°E. It has a total area of 166.81 km^{2}.

== Demographics ==
Religions in Pirojpur Sadar Upazila (2022)
Religion	Percent
Islam	85.18%
Hinduism	14.81%
Other or not stated	0.01%

According to the 2022 Bangladeshi census, Pirojpur Sadar Upazila had 44,783 households and a population of 181,707. 8.71% of the population were under 5 years of age. Pirojpur Sadar had a literacy rate (age 7 and over) of 87.07%: 87.72% for males and 86.44% for females, and a sex ratio of 96.52 males for every 100 females. 77,255 (42.52%) lived in urban areas.

According to the 2011 Census of Bangladesh, Pirojpur Sadar Upazila had 38,017 households and a population of 163,470. 34,704 (21.23%) were under 10 years of age. Pirojpur Sadar had a literacy rate (age 7 and over) of 70.30%, compared to the national average of 51.8%, and a sex ratio of 1026 females per 1000 males. 60,056 (36.74%) lived in urban areas.

As of the 1991 Bangladesh census, Pirojpur Sadar has a population of 225,156. Males constitute 50.93% of the population, and females 49.07%. This Upazila's eighteen up population is 116,628. Pirojpur Sadar has an average literacy rate of 50.7% (7+ years) compared to the national average of 32.4% literate.

== Administration ==
UNO: Md. Arif Murshed Mishu.

Pirojpur Sadar Upazila is divided into Pirojpur Municipality and seven union parishads: Durgapur, Kadamtala, Kalakhali, Shankorpasha, Shariktola, Sikder Mallik, and Tona. The union parishads are subdivided into 64 mauzas and 98 villages.

Pirojpur Municipality is subdivided into 9 wards and 30 mahallas.

== See also ==
- Upazilas of Bangladesh
- Districts of Bangladesh
- Divisions of Bangladesh
- Thanas of Bangladesh
- Administrative geography of Bangladesh
- Union councils of Bangladesh
- Villages of Bangladesh
- Pirojpur District
