= Nazirpur Upazila =

Nazirpur নাজিরপুর
- Upazila
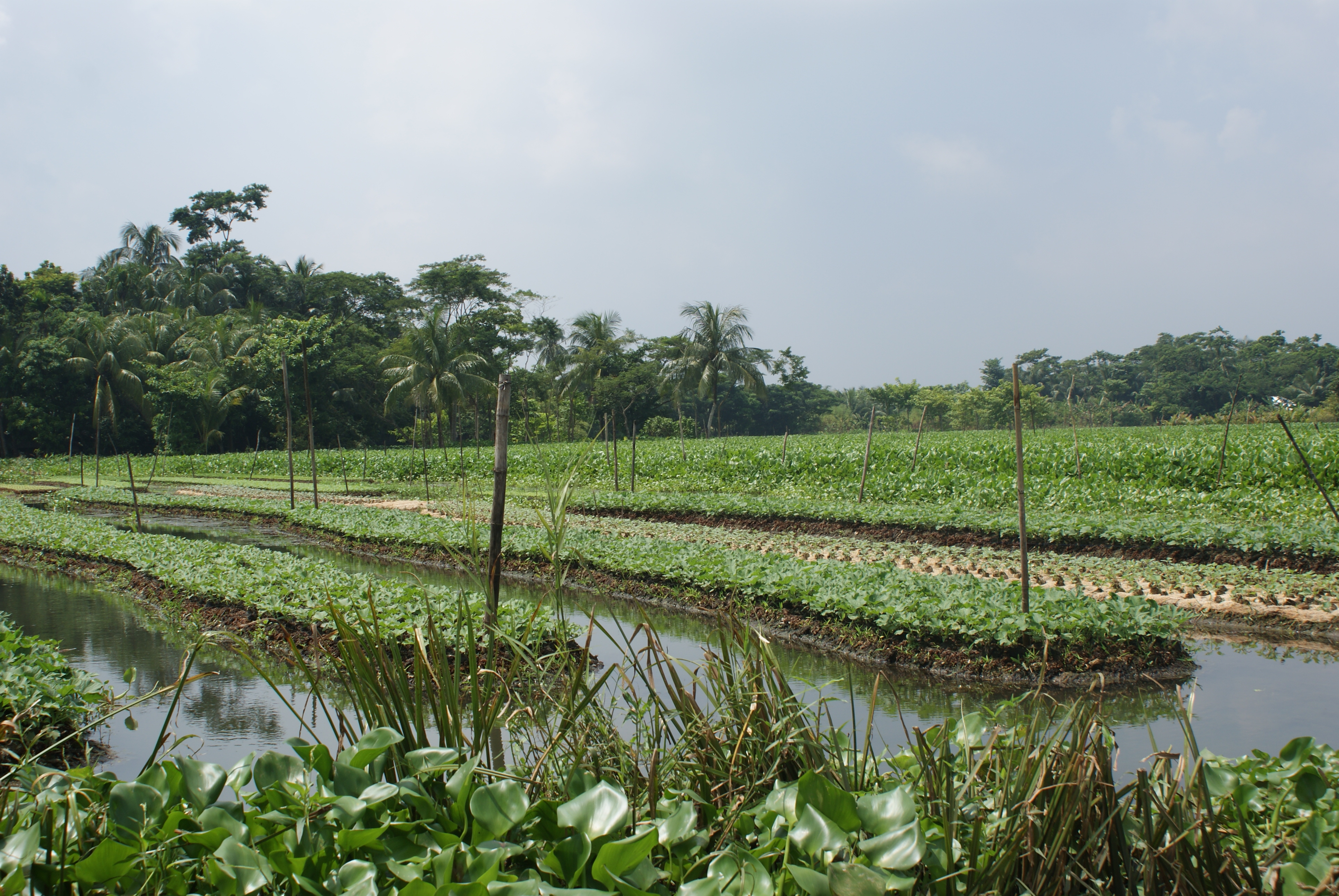
- Floating crop field in the village of Baithakatha, Nazirpur, Pirojpur

- Coordinates: 22°44.8′N 89°58.1′E
- Country: Bangladesh
- Division: Barisal Division
- District: Pirojpur District
- Capital: Nazirpur

Area
  - Total: 233.65 km^{2} (90.21 sq mi)

Population (2022)
  - Total: 187,991
  - Density: 804.58/km^{2} (2,083.9/sq mi)
- Time zone: UTC+6 (BST)
- Postal code: 8540
- Area code: 04626
- Website: Official map of Nazirpur Upazila

Nazirpur Upazila mauza geocode map

Nazirpur (Bengali: নাজিরপুর) is an upazila of Pirojpur District in the Division of Barisal, Bangladesh.

== Geography ==
Nazirpur is located at 22.7461°N 89.9678°E. It has a total area of 228.69 km^{2}.

== Demographics ==
According to the 2022 Bangladeshi census, Nazirpur Upazila had 46,221 households and a population of 187,991. 9.15% of the population were under 5 years of age. Nazirpur had a literacy rate (age 7 and over) of 83.87%: 84.83% for males and 82.94% for females, and a sex ratio of 98.03 males for every 100 females. 24,903 (13.25%) lived in urban areas.

Religions in Nazirpur Upazila (2022)
Religion	Percent
Islam	71.56%
Hinduism	28.43%
Other or not stated	0.01%

Population by religion in Union
Union	Muslim	Hindu	Others
Deulbari Dobra Union	14,977	7,376	2
Dirgha Union	5,882	9,869	5
Kalardoania Union	20,781	1,211	5
Malikhali Union	12,501	9,900	4
Matibhanga Union	18,256	4,132	2
Nazirpur Union	16,044	4,782	3
Shankharikati Union	14,934	3,726	2
Sheikhmatia Union	20,639	3,319	0
Sreeramkati Union	10,507	9,129	0

🟩 Muslim majority 🟧 Hindu majority

According to the 2011 Census of Bangladesh, Nazirpur Upazila had 40,561 households and a population of 180,408. 40,448 (22.42%) were under 10 years of age. Nazirpur has a literacy rate (age 7 and over) of 59.3%, compared to the national average of 51.8%, and a sex ratio of 1011 females per 1000 males. 4,730 (2.62%) lived in urban areas.

According to the 1991 Bangladesh census, Nazirpur had a population of 166,014. Males constituted 50.92% of the population, and females 49.08%. The population aged 18 or over was 86,581. Nazirpur had an average literacy rate of 43.4% (7+ years), compared to the national average of 32.4%.

== Administration ==
UNO: Arup Ratan Singha. (Additional duty)

Nazirpur Upazila is divided into nine union parishads: Daulbari Dobra, Dirgha, Kolardoania, Malikhali, Mativangga, Nazirpur, Shakhmatia, Shakharikathi, and Sriramkathi. The union parishads are subdivided into 68 mauzas and 171 villages.

== Education ==
In the union council of Mativanga Baraibunia Secondary School, Baraibunia Girls School, union council of Malikhali here the Lara Secondary School and next to the 12 no. Jugia Govt. Primary School at Dighia, next to the village of Baithakata, there are the Baithakata College and the Mugarjhor High School.

- Sreeramkathi U.J.K High School
- Nazirpur College
- Bangamata Fazilatunnisa Girls College
- AM Ideal Grammar School
- Qawmi Madrasha (Arabic school)

== See also ==
- Upazilas of Bangladesh
- Districts of Bangladesh
- Divisions of Bangladesh
