= Mehmaan khana =

Room for entertaining guests in houses in parts of South Asia

A mehmaan khana (Dari مہمان خانہ, मेहमान ख़ाना, Bengali: মেহমান খানা) is a drawing room where guests are entertained in many houses in North India, Bangladesh and Pakistan. Alternative names include hujra and baithak. These rooms were a typical feature of many Mughal era havelis palaces and mansions in the region. Many houses in the rural areas of Bangladesh, Pakistan and India still have mehmaan khanas for guests. In Bangladesh, it is more commonly known as baithak ghar or bangla ghar (Bengali: বৈঠক ঘর or বাংলা ঘর).

== Etymology ==
The term mehmān khānā is direct derivation from Persian and means "guest house" or "room". In Iran and adjoining areas, the term can refer to hotels. The term (also spelled memonkhona in Latin script) is also used to describe a guest room in other parts of Central Asia. The term baithak (بیٹهک, बैठक or বৈঠক) literally means sitting room in Hindustani and Bengali. Hujra is derived from Arabic and means room or cell. In non-Pashtun Muslim households or North India and Pakistan, the term hujra (حجره, हुजरा or হুজরা) can also refer to a dedicated prayer room. In Bangladesh, hujra usually refers to the sitting room of the imam in a mosque.

== Hujra ==
The term hujra is especially prevalent in the predominantly Pashtun areas of Pakistan. Pashtun hujras are used mainly to entertain male guests in a household, although sometimes community hujras are also maintained by tribal units. In individual houses, the size and trappings of a hujra are sometimes indicative of family status.

As old as perhaps the Jirga itself is, Hujra is a community club situated in each village, each Khail (street) and some times owned by a well off family but shared by the whole community. Other than a place to accommodate collective ceremonies, male members of the community who hang out and associate like a larger family regularly attend hujra(s). Members of a Hujra are mostly close relatives but other people from neighborhood are also welcomed. Elderly people spend their day to enjoy hubble-bubble and chat over the tea, younger men in their spare time listen to the stories of elders and raise issues while the children keep playing around, waiting for a call from one of the elders to take a message or bring fresh tea. A guest house for male guests, Hujra also serves as a place to initiate Jirgas. Issues are put on the table, brainstormed and a consensus is developed before the issue can be put to the wider community. Hujra is considered to be a secular place but closely associated with Hujra is the role of mosque in the neighborhood. Although there are few similarities between a mosque and a Hujra, the role of mosque has gained more importance recently due to many national and regional settings tilted towards Islamization. Additionally, the role of Hujra is diminishing from community life because of the economic trends, and a faster pace of life which allows little leisure time with people to spare for community based activities. Decay in the institution of Hujra is definitely affecting the efficacy of Jirga, but this study tends not necessarily to argue for reinvigoration of Hujra; rather our focus will remain to find strengths and challenges for Jirga from where it is today and move forward.

== Mehmaan Khana ==
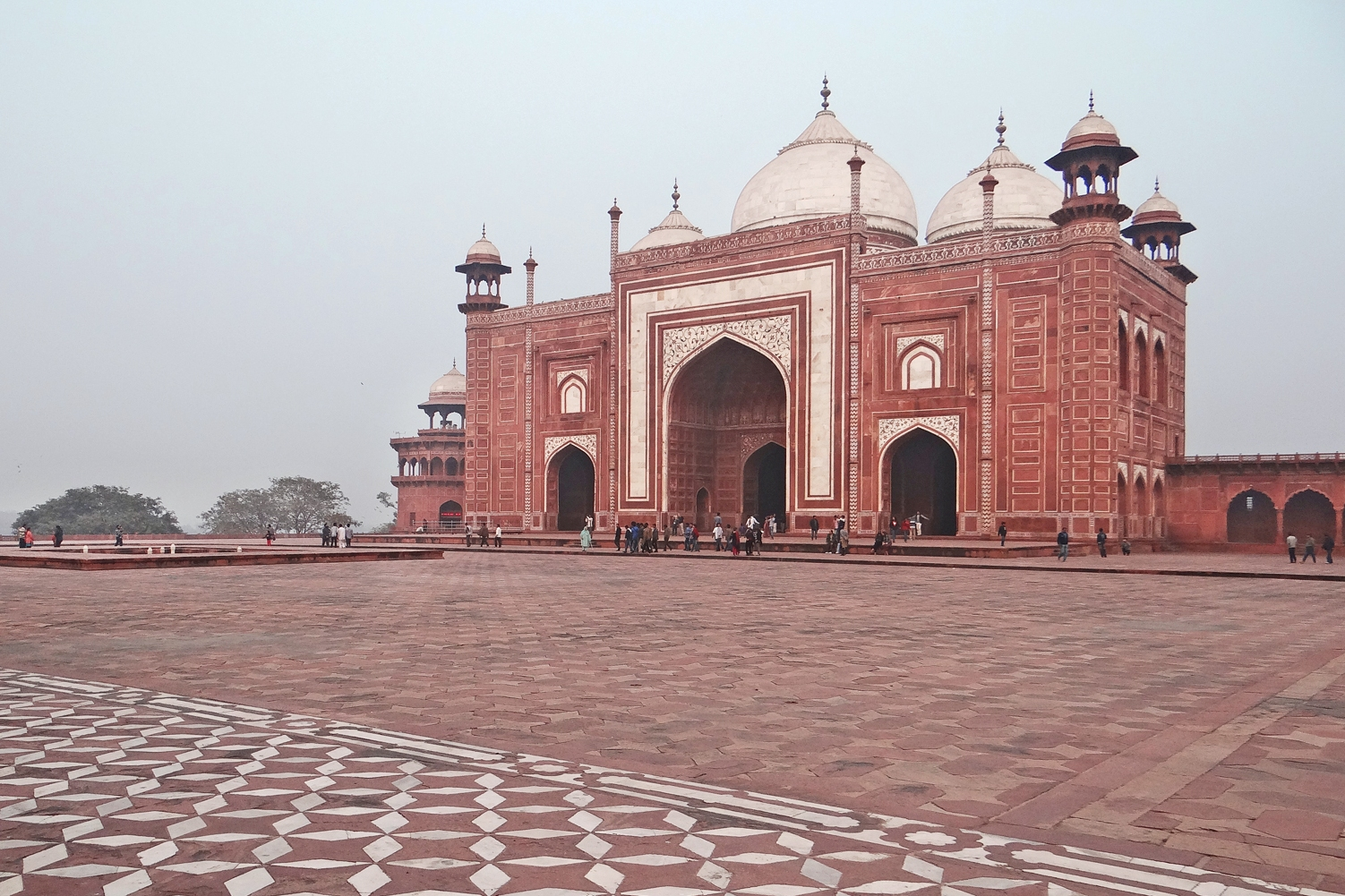
Mehmaankhana at Taj Mahal

To the east side of the Taj Mahal is a guest house or mehmankhana resembling the mosque Naqqar Khana, which gives symmetry to the facade.
