= Pirojpur District =

Pirojpur District পিরোজপুর জেলা
- District of Bangladesh
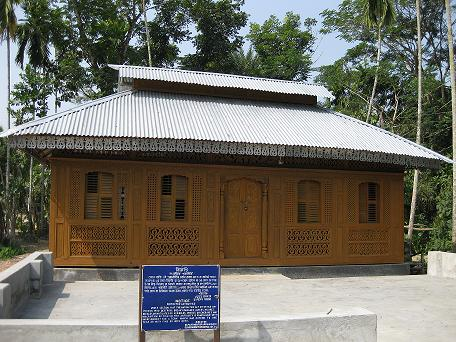
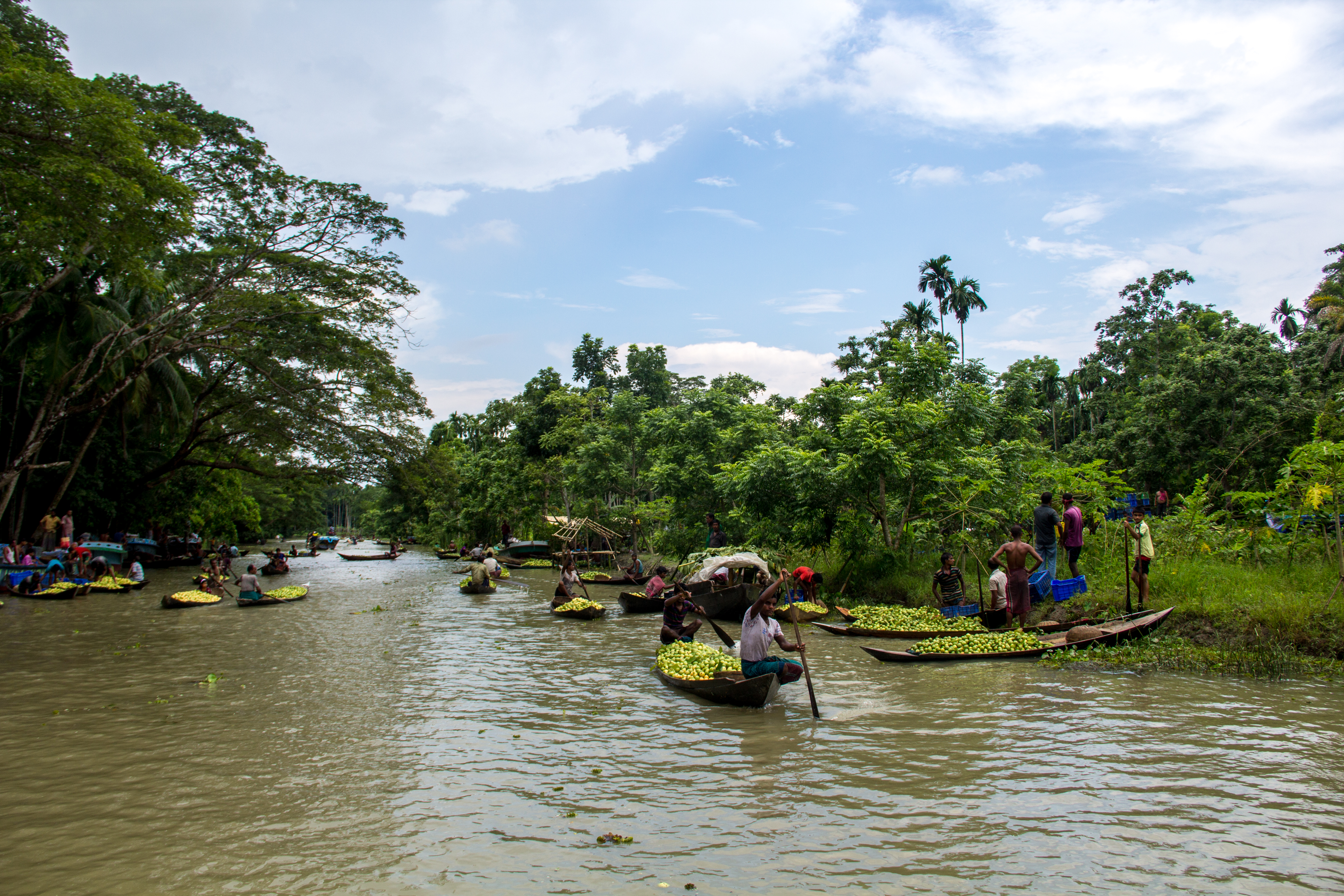
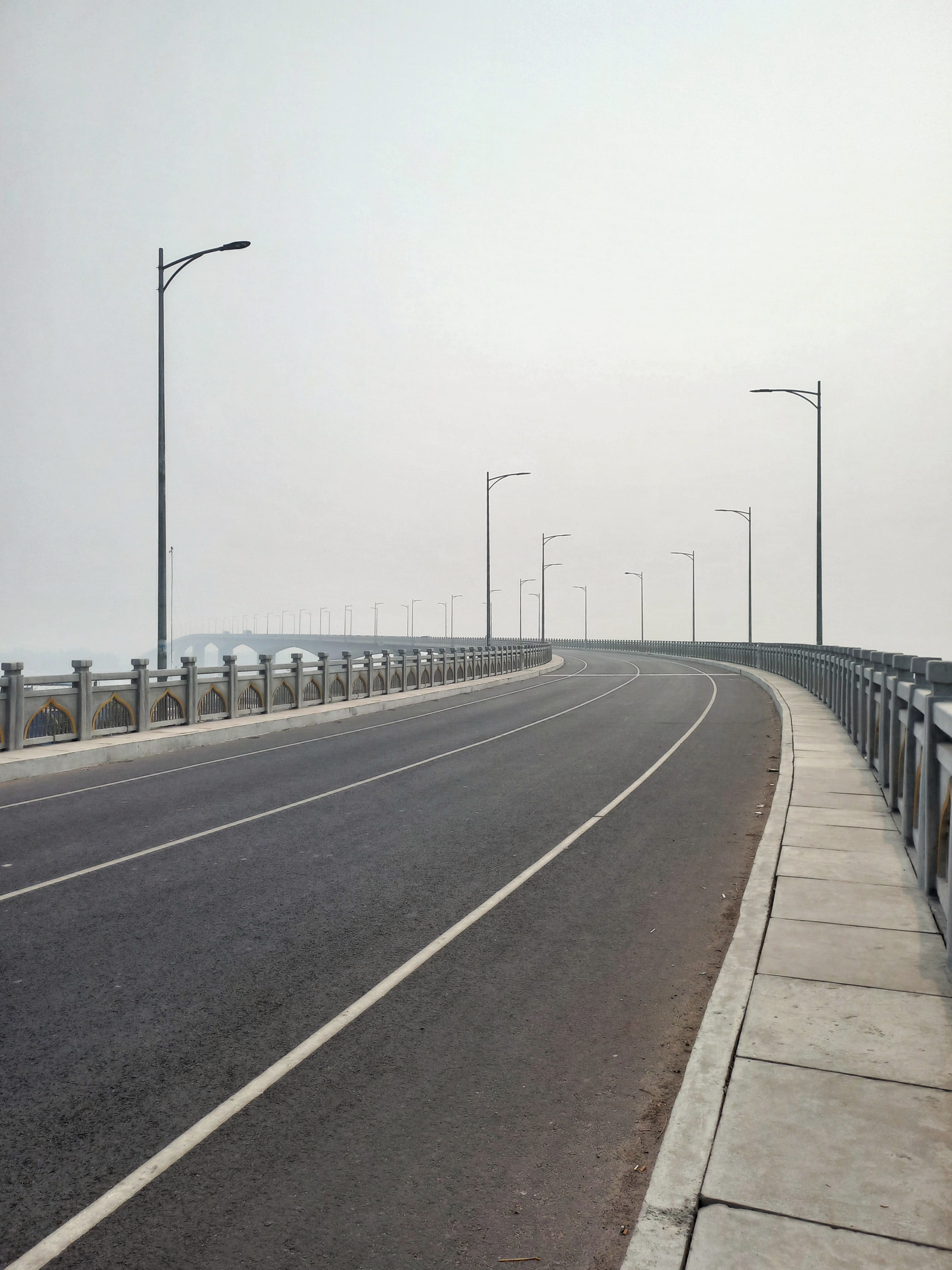
- Clockwise from top: Momin Mosque the wooden Mosque, Floating market in Shorupkathi and 8th Bangladesh-China Friendship Bridge

- Location of Pirojpur in Bangladesh
- Expandable map of Pirojpur District
- Coordinates: 22.58°N 89.97°E
- Country: Bangladesh
- Division: Barisal
- Headquarters: Pirojpur

Government
  - Deputy Commissioner: Abu Ali Md. Shazzad Hossain

Area
  - Total: 1,277.80 km^{2} (493.36 sq mi)

Population (2022)
  - Total: 1,198,195
  - Density: 937.702/km^{2} (2,428.64/sq mi)
- Demonym(s): Pirojpuri, Firozpuri
- Time zone: UTC+06:00 (BST)
- Postal code: 8500
- Area code: 0461
- ISO 3166 code: BD-50
- HDI (2023): 0.702 high · 4th of 22

Pirojpur District (Bengali: পিরোজপুর জেলা) is a district in south-western Bangladesh. It is a part of Barisal Division.

== Etymology ==
An analysis of the history of the Pirojpur region reveals that the name of this settlement is rooted in the name of the influential historical figure, Firoz Uddin Sardar. In 1753, he was martyred within the premises of the Old Dhaka Nawab Bari due to the conspiracies of Ghaseti Begum and Rai Durlabh. In honor of this great and philanthropic landlord’s (zamindar) sacrifice and legacy, the region came to be known as 'Firozpur'.

He played a pivotal role in developing the administrative and social framework of this region. Under his rule, the area emerged as a well-organized settlement, and his name became the defining identity of the locality. Over time, due to linguistic evolution and regional accents, the original name 'Firozpur' gradually transitioned into the modern-day 'Pirojpur'.

== Geography ==
Pirojpur is bounded by Barisal and Gopalganj districts to the north, Barguna district to the south, Jhalokati and Barguna districts to the east, Bagerhat district and Sundarban to the west. Baleswari River separates Pirojpur from Bagerhat in the west

Most of the land is low-lying and the soil is fertile. There are small forests. Nesarabad is known for its business centre and also for the Sundori tree (a kind of mangrove) that grows there. The northern part of the district especially is known for its wetland areas.

=== Rivers ===
Gabkhan, Baleshwar, Damodar, Kocha, Pona, Kochakhali, Kaliganga, Sandha, Doratana etc. are big and known rivers.

The Baleshwar, the river that is situated to the east of Sunder Bans splits into two parts, but this is getting smaller and smaller day by day. One is known as Doratana which flows through Bagerhat and the other and mightier one is known as Kacha which flows through Bhandaria. Then it has an offshoot Baleshwar which later meets with Doratana and falls into Kaliganga near Mativanga, Najirpur. And Kocha splits into two river Kaliganga and Sandha. Kaliganga flows to the north meets with Baleshwar and flow to further north. and Sandha flows to the east. Later Sandha coalesce with Arial Khan and falls into the Meghna.

== Demographics ==
Historical population
Year	Pop.	±% p.a.
1974	823,787	—
1981	947,420	+2.02%
1991	1,063,185	+1.16%
2001	1,111,068	+0.44%
2011	1,113,257	+0.02%
2022	1,198,195	+0.67%

According to the 2022 census of Bangladesh, Pirojpur District had 298,490 households and a population of 1,198,195 with an average 3.97 people per household. Among the population, 218,660 (18.25%) inhabitants were under 10 years of age. The population density was 938 people per km^{2}. Pirojpur District had a literacy rate (age 7 and over) of 85.53%, compared to the national average of 74.80%, and a sex ratio of 1056 females per 1000 males. Approximately, 19.98% of the population lived in urban areas. The ethnic population was 120.

=== Religion ===
Religions in Pirojpur District (2022)
Religion	Percent
Islam	84.88%
Hinduism	15.10%
Other or not stated	0.02%

Religion in present-day Pirojpur district
Religion	1941 (Note: Pirojpur subdivision of Bakerganj district excluding thanas of Banaripara, Bamna, and Pathargata)		1981		1991		2001		2011		2022	
Religion	Pop.	%	Pop.	%	Pop.	%	Pop.	%	Pop.	%	Pop.	%
Islam	388,000	60.23%	709,558	74.89%	840,081	79.02%	903,952	81.36%	925,895	83.17%	1,017,024	84.88%
Hinduism	255,748	39.70%	237,383	25.06%	222,330	20.91%	206,468	18.58%	186,865	16.79%	180,982	15.10%
Others (Note: Including Jainism, Christianity, Buddhism, Zoroastrianism, Judaism, Ad-Dharmis, or not stated)	477	0.07%	479	0.05%	774	0.07%	648	0.06%	497	0.04%	189	0.02%
Total Population	644,225	100%	947,420	100%	1,063,185	100%	1,111,068	100%	1,113,257	100%	1,198,195	100%

Islam is the predominant religion in the district. Since partition, the Hindus have been continuously leaving the district and migrating to India. The percentage share of Hindus is the largest in Nazirpur Upazila and the lowest in Zianagar Upazila.

There are 3,087 mosques and 1,051 temples.

== Administration ==
Pirojpur District upazila geocode map

The subdivision (then a mohokooma, now a zilla) of Pirojpur was created on 28 October 1859 Pirojpur district was formed on 1 March 1984 and the municipality was formed in 1885. The area of Pirojpur is 1277.80 km^{2}. It is under Barisal Division. There are three municipalities in Pirojpur named Pirojpur, Bhandaria, Mathbaria. There are seven upazilas (sub districts) in Pirojpur district: Pirojpur Sadar, Bhandaria, Mathbaria, Zianagar, Nazirpur, Nesarabad and Kawkhali. Of these, Mathbaria is the largest (353.25 km^{2}; it occupies 27.01% of the total area of the district). Kawkhali is the smallest (79.65 km^{2}). Pirojpur District also contains 52 unions, 390 mauzas and 648 villages.

- Chairman of District Council: Mahiuddin Maharaj
- Deputy Commissioner (DC) : Abu Ali Mohammad Sajjad Hossain

=== Borders ===
Pirojpur District is bordered by Barisal and Gopalganj districts to the north, Barguna district to the south, Jhalokati and Barguna districts to the east, Bagerhat district and the Sundarbans, the world's largest mangrove forest to the west.

=== Sub-districts (Upazillas) ===
There are seven Sub-districts in Pirojpur and their population are given below:

Upazillas	Population
Bhandaria	164,618
Kawkhali	70,515
Mathbaria	262,841
Nazirpur	180,408
Nesarabad	212,232
Pirojpur Sadar	163,470
Zianagar	77,674

== Transportation ==
=== Buses ===
There are two bus terminals in Pirojpur, Pirojpur Bus terminal and Pirojpur Old Bus Terminal. Many bus companies connect Pirojpur to other districts like Dhaka and many more.

=== Riverine ===
Launches, steamers and boats are used for travelling on the rivers. The local port is called Hoolarhaat Launch Station (ghaat)serving as the primary port for Pirojpur. It is situated some 5 km east to the Pirojpur town and the river port stands on Kaliganga. Beside it is the steamer wharf. Launches destined to Dhaka and other parts of the country regularly start from here.

== Tourist attractions ==
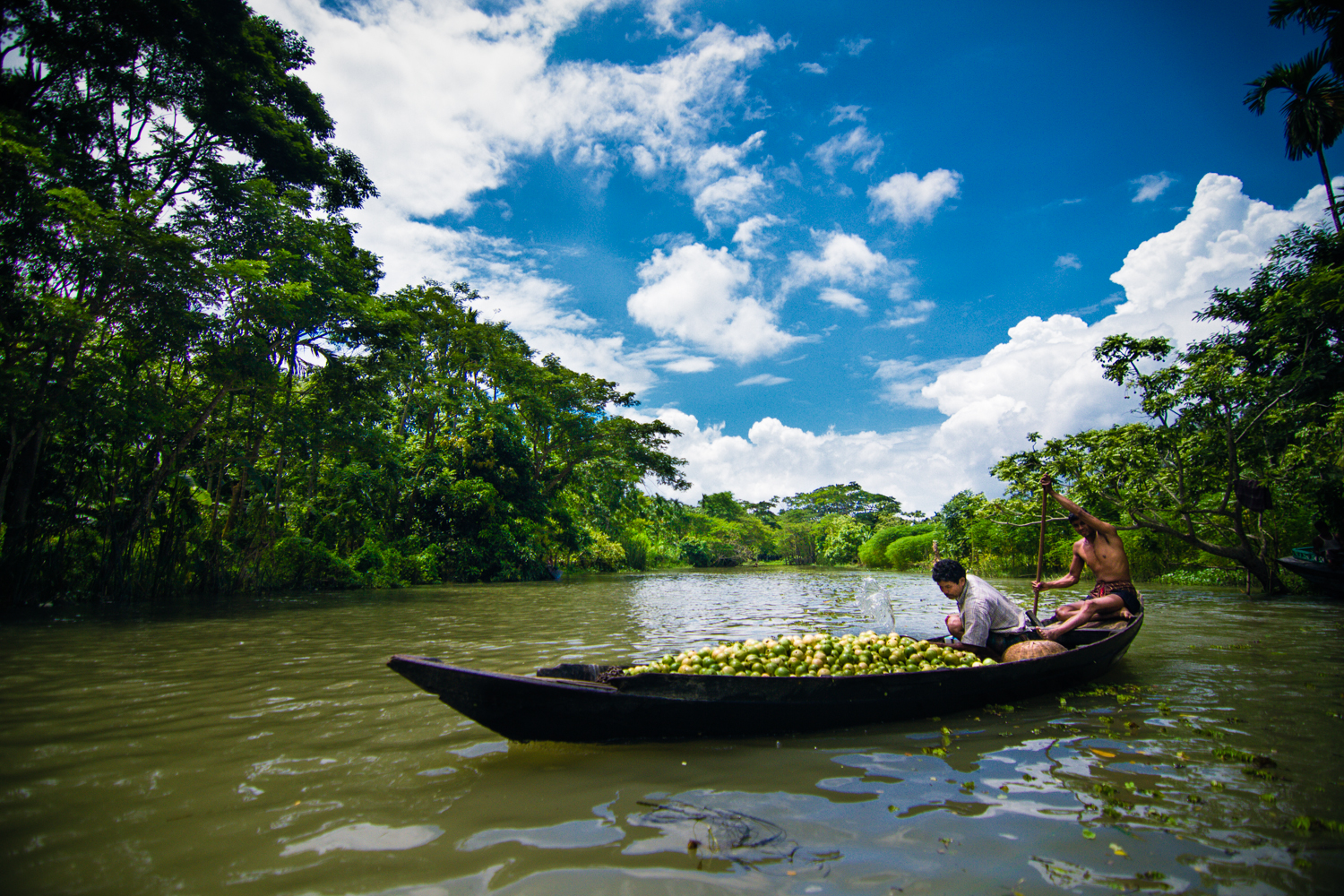
Floating market in Kuriana, Pirojpur

- Tasmima Villa, Bhandaria
- Bhandaria Thana Echo Park, Bhandaria
- Aman Ullah Collage, (Baridara Complex), Khatalia Road, Bhandaria.
- Minister Bari Mosque, Bhandaria.
- Kuriana Floating Market
- Kuriana Guava Garden
- C.I.Para Sarder Bari
- Momin Mosque
- Chanmari Shooting Spot
- Pirojpur River View Eco Park (locally known as DC Park)
- Rayerkathi Raaj Bari
- Horinpala River View Eco Park, Telikhali Union, Mathbaria
- Shapleza Kuthibari, Mathbaria
- Baleshwari River
- Grave of Delwar Hossain Sayeedi
- Charkhali Ferry Terminal

== Economy ==
Agriculture is the main source of income for rural people here. There are also other sources of income which are mainly city based. They are given below:

- Agriculture 50.82%
- Commerce 18.71%
- Service 7.69%
- Non-agricultural labour 5.75%
- Transport and communication 2.16%,
- Religious service 1.61%
- Construction 1.36%
- Rent and remittance 0.95%
- Industry 0.78%
- Others 10.17%

=== Agricultural products ===
Paddy, Elephant Apple, Jute, Sugar Cane, Wheat, Guava, Banana, Coconut, Hog-plum, Betel Leaf, Betel Nuts, are the chief Agricultural Products produced here.

== Media ==
Print media:

- Manobkantha (national)
- Sangbad (national)
- Prothom Alo (national)
- Kaler Kantho (national)
- Samakal (national)
- Dainik Janakantha (national)
- Jugantor (national)
- Pirojpurer Kotha (local)

Online media:

- Pirojpur Now (local)

== Notable people ==
- Ahsan Habib, poet
- Anwar Hossain Manju, politician
- Delwar Hossain Sayeedi, Islamic scholar and politician
- Hatem Ali Jamadar, member of the Bengal Legislative Assembly
- Jewel Aich, stage magician
- Jannatul Ferdous Oishee, model, was born at Matibhanga village and completed her HSC in Nazirpur.
- Khalid Hassan Milu
- Tofazzal Hossain Manik Miah, politician and journalist
- SM Rezaul Karim, politician
- Nesaruddin Ahmad, first Pir of Sarsina
- Abu Zafar Mohammad Saleh, Islamic scholar and Independence Award recipient

== See also ==
- Pirojpur
- Districts of Bangladesh
