= Naushad Siddiqui =

Indian politician

Pirzada Naushad Siddiqui
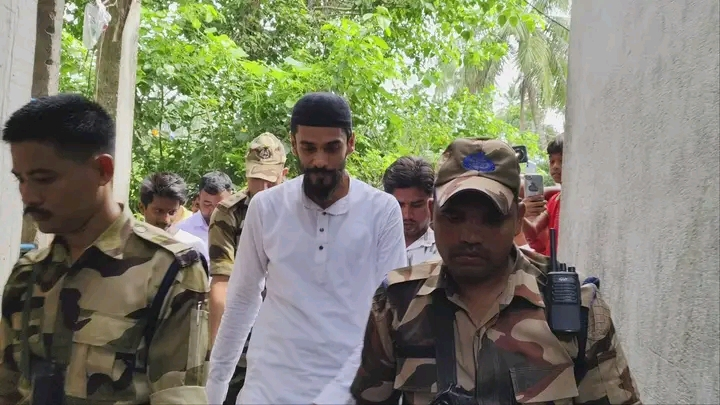
- The MLA of Bhangar, South 24 Parganas

Member of the West Bengal Legislative Assembly
- Incumbent
- Assumed office 2 May 2021
- Preceded by: Abdur Razzak Molla
- Constituency: Bhangar

Chairman of West Bengal Legislative Assembly Development Committee
- Incumbent
- Assumed office 9 July 2021
- Preceded by: Position established

Personal details
- Born: 2 May 1993 (age 33)
- Party: Indian Secular Front
- Relations: Abbas Siddiqui (Brother)
- Parent: Mohammad Ali Akbar Siddique (father)
- Education: Aliah University

Religious life
- Religion: Islam
- Denomination: Sunni
- Jurisprudence: Hanafi
- Tariqa: Silsila-e-Furfura

Pirzada Mohammad Nawsad Siddiqui (born 2 May 1993) is an Indian politician belonging to the Indian Secular Front (ISF). He is the Chairman of the ISF. Currently, he is serving as an MLA from Bhangar constituency in the West Bengal Legislative Assembly. He is great-grandson of the Pir of Furfura's Mohammad Abu Bakr Siddique.

== Early life and education ==
Nawsad Siddiqui is from Bhangar, South 24 Paraganas district, West Bengal. His father Ali Akbar Siddiqui was the son of Pir Zulfiqar Ali, known as "Chhto Huzur" of Furfura Sharif. He is the fourth generation of the founder of Furfura Sharif Mohammad Abu Bakr Siddique. Nawsad's elder brother Abbas Siddiqui is the founder of the All India Secular Front. In 2015, he obtained a master's degree under Aliah University.

== Political career ==
On 21 January 2021, Abbas Siddiqui founded a new political party called the Indian Secular Front and appointed his younger brother Nawsad as its chairman. Ahead of the 2021 assembly elections, the party formed a united front called Sanjukta Morcha with the Indian National Congress and the Left Front.

In the 2021 West Bengal Legislative Assembly election, Nawsad was elected from Bhangar as a candidate representing Rashtriya Secular Majlis Party. The Sanjukta Morcha won only this seat in the election.

=== Electoral Performance ===
West Bengal Legislative Assembly
Year	Constituency	Party	Votes	%	Opponent	Party	Votes	%	Margin	Result
2026	Bhangar	ISF	1,26,555	47.33	Saokat Molla	AITC	94,467	35.33	32,088	Won

== See also ==
- 2026 West Bengal Legislative Assembly election
- List of chief ministers of West Bengal
- West Bengal Legislative Assembly
- 18th West Bengal Assembly
