= Nesaruddin Ahmad =

Bangladeshi Islamic scholar

Allama Shah Sufi Nesaruddin Ahmad Sarsinar Pir Saheb Qibla
- নেছারউদ্দীন আহমদ
- Nesaruddin Ahmad, Pir of Sarsina

Personal life
- Born: 1873 Magura, Firozpur, Backergunge District, Bengal Province
- Died: January 31, 1952 (aged 78–79) Sarsina, Firozpur, East Bengal, Dominion of Pakistan
- Resting place: Sarsina Darbar Sharif graveyard
- Children: Abu Zafar Mohammad Saleh
- Education: Calcutta Alia Madrasa; Hooghly Madrasah

Religious life
- Religion: Islam
- Denomination: Sunni
- Jurisprudence: Hanafi
- Tariqa: Furfura (Chishti-Qadri-Naqshbandi (Mujaddidi))
- Creed: Maturidi

Muslim leader
- Disciple of: Mohammad Abu Bakr Siddique
- Influenced by: Syed Ahmad Shaheed Abdul Awwal Jaunpuri

1st Pir of Sarsina
- Succeeded by: Abu Zafar Mohammad Saleh

Naib-e-Sadar of Jamiat-e-Ulama Bangla o Assam
- Arabic name
- Personal (Ism): Nithār ad-Dīn Aḥmad نثار الدين أحمد
- Patronymic (Nasab): ibn Ṣadr ad-Dīn ibn Ẓahīr ad-Dīn بن صدر الدين بن ظهير الدين
- Epithet (Laqab): Shôrśinar Pīr Ṣāḥeb Qiblah শর্ষিণার পীর সাহেব কেবলা
- Toponymic (Nisba): Ākhūnd آخوند al-Barīsālī البريسالي

Nesaruddin Ahmad (Bengali: নেছারউদ্দীন আহমদ; 1873 – 31 January 1952) was a Bengali Islamic scholar, spiritual reformer, educationist and writer. He was the main disciple of Furfura Sharif's Mohammad Abu Bakr Siddique in eastern Bengal. Ahmad was the inaugural Pir of Sarsina (Bengali: শর্ষিণার পীর), having founded the Sarsina Darbar Sharif and Darussunnat Kamil Madrasa in 1915, one of the largest Islamic institutions in South Bengal and the first major alia madrasah after Calcutta. Ahmad was among the leading Islamic leaders in colonial Barisal, and his influence extended across Bengal. The Nesarabad Upazila of Bangladesh has been named after him.

== Early life and family ==
Ahmad was born in 1873 to a Bengali Muslim family of Akhunds in the village of Magura, Firozpur, then located under the Backergunge District of the Bengal Presidency. When he was twelve years old, his father, Sadruddin Akhund, decided to set off for the Hajj pilgrimage to Arabia. Akhund was a murid of Haji Saizuddin Miah of Bahadurpur. Before leaving, he married Ahmad to Sahera Khatun, the daughter of his neighbour Daliluddin Shiqdar. Ahmad's father died in Mecca, being buried in Jannat al-Mu'alla, and so Ahmad was raised by his mother, Zohra Begum, and paternal grandfather. His paternal grandfather, Zahiruddin Akhund, was a munshi and disciple of Haji Shariatullah of the Faraizi movement based in Mathbaria where he had a sizeable following.

In 1905, Ahmad married the daughter of Abdul Wafi Chowdhury from Kushla, Gopalganj.

== Career ==
After receiving khilafat (spiritual succession) from his murshid Mohammad Abu Bakr Siddique, Ahmad returned to his village. He planned to leave for Hajj but was affected by pox. As soon as he recovered in 1901, Ahmad boarded the ship to Arabia along with his family and nephew Abdur Rashid. His wife, Sahera Khatun, and son, Shah Muhammad Muzahar, died in Mecca. After returning to Bengal, Ahmad dedicated himself to propagating Islamic teachings. In 1905, he built a small library in his village which became the Qiratiyyah Madrasah in 1913. In 1918, he decided to transform the library into a madrasa modelled from Calcutta Alia Madrasa. Ahmad named the madrasa "Sarsina Darussunnat Kamil Alia Madrasa". From then on, the village of Magura got the name of Sarsina. He appointed Moulvi Mirza Ali of Idilpur as its head. Ahmad donated all of his property to act as the madrasa's waqf in 1934. With the assistance of Prime Minister A. K. Fazlul Huq, the madrasa became the second title madrasa of Bengal after Calcutta in 1938.

Ahmad gave his support to Maniruzzaman Islamabadi's plans in establishing a dedicated Islamic university in Chittagong.

=== Political involvement ===
Ahmad was a supporter of the Pakistan Movement. He maintained good relations with Shamsul Haque Faridpuri, who belonged to the Deobandi movement. He favoured Faridpuri over Sheikh Mujibur Rahman in the Muslim League local elections. Ahmad sent a telegram to Muhammad Ali Jinnah requesting that he admits A. K. Fazlul Huq back into the All-India Muslim League to ensure the League's victory in Barisal. In 1946, Ahmad organised the All-India Ulama Conference held at Mohammad Ali Park, Calcutta. At the conference, Ahmad co-signed a petition with Abdul Hai Siddique in pamphlet form addressing Bengali Muslim voters in favour of Pakistan. During the 1947 Sylhet referendum, he sent an eight-member team (including Azizur Rahman Qaid Nesarabadi) to Sylhet under the leadership of his son Abu Zafar Mohammad Saleh.

After the independence of Pakistan, Ahmad focused on Islamic values within the government. An outline of 22 points was formulated at the All-Parties Ulama Conference in Sarsina. Ahmad presided the East Bengal Horooful Quran Conference in Dacca in August 1951, which supported Urdu as the national language of Pakistan and Bengali in Arabic script as the provincial language.

== Bibliography ==
Ahmad was written many books relating to Islam. He wrote articles for the fortnightly Tabligh magazine. Among them are:

- মোছলেম রত্নহার (Moslem Ratnahar)
- ফুরফুরা পীর সাহেবের অছিয়তনামা (Furfura Pir Saheber Asiyatnama)
- তালিমে মারেফত (Talim-e-Marefat)
- তাহকীকে বর্জখ (Tahqiq-e-Barzakh)
- খেলাফত আন্দোলন পদ্ধতি (Khelafat Andolan Paddhati)
- সমাজ উন্নতি (Samaj Unnati)
- মাওলানার উক্তি (Mawlanar Ukti)
- ছোবহেছাদেক (Subh-e-Sadeq)
- রদ্দে বদগুমান (Radd-e-Badguman)
- মজহব ও তকলীদ (Mazhab O Taqlid)
- দাড়ি গোঁফ সমস্যা ও হক কথা (Dari Gof Samasya O Haq Katha)
- নুরুন হেদায়েত ও বেদাত ফকিরের ধোকা ভঞ্জন (Nurun Hedayet O Bedat Faqirer Dhoka Bhanjan)
- ফতোয়ায়ে ছিদ্দিকী (Fatwa-e-Siddiqi)
- তরিকুল ইসলাম (Tariqul Islam)
- নারী ও পরদা (Nari O Parda)
- জুমার অকাট্য দলীল প্রভৃতি (Jumar Akatya Dalil Prabhriti)
- দাড়ি ও ধুমপান (Dari O Dhumpan)
- হজরত বায়েজীদ বোস্তামী (Hazrat Bayazid Bostami)
- الحقيقة المعرفة الربانية (Al-Haqiqah al-Marifah al-Rabbaniyyah)

== Death and legacy ==
Ahmad died on 31 January 1952 and was buried at the Sarsina Darbar Sharif. He was succeeded by his son, Abu Zafar Mohammad Saleh, as the Pir of Sarsina. His other son, Azizur Rahman Qaid, founded the Nesarabad Darbar Sharif. In 1985, the Swarupkati Upazila was renamed to Nesarabad Upazila in honour of Ahmad. The annual gathering at Sarsina Darbar Sharif, which was started in 1891, continues to take place.

== See also ==
- Muhammad Shahidullah
- Delwar Hossain Sayeedi
- Ahmed Ali Enayetpuri
