= Abbas Siddiqui =

Islamic scholar, theologian and politician

Pirzada Abbas Siddiqui

Personal details
- Born: Mohammad Abbass Siddiquie Furfura Sharif, Hooghly, West Bengal
- Party: All India Secular Front
- Parent: Mohammad Ali Akbar Siddique (father)
- Relatives: Mohammad Abu Bakr Siddique (great-grandfather); Nawsad Siddique (brother)
- Education: Furfura Fatehia Senior Madrasah
- Occupation: Islamic Scholar • Politician
- Nickname: Bhaijaan

Religious life
- Religion: Islam
- Denomination: Sunni
- Jurisprudence: Hanafi
- Tariqa: Silsila-e-Furfura

Pirzada Md. Abbas Siddiqui (born 1987) is an Islamic scholar, social activist and Indian politician who founded the All India Secular Front political party in 2021. He is a cleric of the Furfura Sharif in Hooghly, West Bengal and is the scion of the Siddique family, which is the founder and custodian of the Furfura Sharif.

== Early life ==
Abbas Siddiqui was born to Pirzada Ali Akbar Siddiqui. He is the great-grandson of Mohammad Abu Bakr Siddique who established the Silsila-e-Furfura (Order of Furfura Sharif) and is the nephew of Toha Siddiqui. Siddiqui has studied Islamic Theology from Furfura Fatehia Senior Madrasah.

== Political career ==
On 21 January 2021 he formed his party Indian Secular Front which will be contesting in the 2021 West Bengal Elections. Initially they planned to join hands with AIMIM leader Asaduddin Owaisi. However, that plan faltered and instead he joined hands with the Left Front (comprising various communist parties) and the Congress to form the Sanjukta Morcha. His party All India Secular Front contested on a borrowed symbol from Rashtriya Secular Majlis Party (RSMP) which is a Bihar-based party.
