= Abdul Khaleque (scholar) =

Pakistani Islamic preacher and politician

Pir Mawlānā Abdul Khaleque Sufi

Member of the East Bengal Legislative Assembly for Brahmanbaria South-East Muslim
- In office 1954–1955
- Governor: Chaudhry Khaliquzzaman; Iskander Mirza; Muhammad Shahabuddin
- Chief Minister: A.K. Fazlul Huq; Abu Hussain Sarkar
- Preceded by: constituency created

Personal details
- Born: 1892 Tipperah District, Bengal Presidency, British India
- Died: 2 April 1955 (aged 62–63) Dacca, East Bengal, Dominion of Pakistan
- Resting place: Chhatura
- Citizenship: Pakistan
- Party: Independent
- Children: Abdus Sabur Ashrafee
- Education: Comilla Hossamia Madrasa; Ishwar Pathshala; Comilla Victoria Government College; University of Dhaka
- Occupation: Professor, Translator, Islamic scholar

Personal life
- Education: Jamiyat-e-Ula; Bachelor of Arts; Master of Arts

Religious life
- Religion: Islam
- Denomination: Sunni
- Order: Chhatura Sharif
- Jurisprudence: Hanafi

Muslim leader
- Disciple of: Sadr Uddin Ahmad Shaheed, Abu Bakr Siddique
- Influenced: Burhanuddin

Abdul Khaleque was a social reformer, Islamic preacher, educator, philosopher, Sufi personality, politician, and writer. He was born in 1892 in the village of Chhatura, in the Tipperah District of Bengal Presidency, British India (now in Akhaura Upazila, Brahmanbaria District, Bangladesh).

== Career ==
He began his career as a Persian professor at Feni Government College. Later, he served as a professor and administrator at Presidency College, Kolkata, Lady Brabourne College, and Dhaka Eden Girls' College. Between 1925 and 1949, he worked at various educational institutions.

Mawlana Khaleque was also the chief disciple of Mawlana Abu Bakr Siddique of Furfura Sharif and actively preached Islam across different regions of the Indian subcontinent.

He was master of Noor Muhammad Nizampuri. After Pakistan's independence in 1947, the Taleemat-e-Islami Board was formed to adapt Islamic legal structure to the first Pakistani constitution. He was a member of it.

In the Legislative Assembly election of 1954, he contested as an independent candidate and defeated opponents from both the United Front and the Pakistan Muslim League to secure a seat in the East Bengal Legislative Assembly.

== Literary works ==
Mawlana Abdul Khaleq authored many books, including the renowned Sirajus Salikin and Sayyidul Mursalin. He translated Munabbihat into Bengali and wrote Guncha-e-Farsi and Durratul Adab, which were once part of the Kolkata Education Board curriculum.

== Personal life ==
He had two sons, of whom only one is known: Abdus Sabur Ashrafee, a lawyer and close associate of Sheikh Mujibur Rahman. He was associated with the Dhaka Bar Association.

== Death and legacy ==
He died on 2 April 1955, at his residence in Bakshi Bazar, Dhaka. After his death, his shrine was established in chhaturaura, which is now known as the Chhatura Darbar Sharif Complex.
