= Abu Zafar Mohammad Saleh =

Bangladeshi Islamic scholar

- আবু জাফর মোহাম্মদ সালেহ

Personal life
- Born: 1915 Sarsina, Swarupkati, Backergunge District, Bengal Province
- Died: 13 February 1990 (aged 74–75) Sarsina, Nesarabad, Pirojpur District, Bangladesh
- Resting place: Sarsina Darbar Sharif graveyard
- Parent: Nesaruddin Ahmad
- Education: Darussunnat Kamil Madrasa; Mazahir Uloom; Darul Uloom Deoband

Religious life
- Religion: Islam
- Denomination: Sunni
- Jurisprudence: Hanafi

Muslim leader
- Teacher: Nesaruddin Ahmad; Zakariyya al-Kandhlawi
- Influenced by: Mohammad Abu Bakr Siddique, Hussain Ahmad Madani
- Awards: Independence Day Award (1980)

2nd Pir of Sarsina
- In office 31 January 1952 – 13 February 1990
- Preceded by: Nesaruddin Ahmad
- Succeeded by: Shah Muhibbullah
- Arabic name
- Personal (Ism): Muḥammad Ṣāliḥ محمد صالح
- Patronymic (Nasab): ibn Nithār ad-Dīn Aḥmad ibn Ṣadr ad-Dīn ibn Ẓahīr ad-Dīn بن نثار الدين أحمد بن صدر الدين بن ظهير الدين
- Teknonymic (Kunya): Abū Jaʿfar أبو جعفر
- Epithet (Laqab): Pīr Ṣāḥeb Sārsīna পীর সাহেব ছারছিনা
- Toponymic (Nisba): Ākhūnd آخوند al-Barīsālī البريسالي

Abu Zafar Mohammad Saleh (Bengali: আবু জাফর মোহাম্মদ সালেহ; 1915 – 13 February 1990), popularly known as the Pir of Sarsina, was a Bangladeshi Islamic scholar. He was said to have contributed to the establishment of 3000 educational institutions. Saleh had also pushed for the establishment of the Islamic Arabic University and ibtedayi madrasas in Bangladesh. Despite being a recipient of the Independence Day Award, he has been accused of collaborating with the Pakistan Army and committing war crimes during the Bangladesh Liberation war.

== Early life and family ==
Saleh was born on a Thursday in 1915, to a scholarly Bengali Muslim family of Pirs in the village of Sarsina in Swarupkati (later renamed to Nesarabad), Firozpur, then situated in the Backergunge District of the Bengal Province. His father, Nesaruddin Ahmad, was a khalifah (spiritual successor) of Furfura Sharif's Mohammad Abu Bakr Siddique and the inaugural Pir of Sarsina. His grandfather, Haji Sadruddin Akhand, and great-grandfather, Munshi Zahiruddin Akhand, were also prominent Sufis of the Greater Barisal region.

== Education ==
Saleh began his education under his father. He enrolled at the Darussunnat Kamil Madrasa in Sarsina – one of the most prominent institutions in greater Barisal, founded by his father in 1915. Saleh studied several books there including the Mishkat al-Masabih. He then set off for Hindustan, where he studied at the Mazahir Uloom seminary of Saharanpur. He completed his studies there by reciting the Kutub al-Sittah to his teachers. Among his teachers in Saharanpur were Zakariyya al-Kandhlawi, Abdur Rahman Kamilpuri, Allamah Asadullah and Allamah Siddiq. Saleh was then admitted into Darul Uloom Deoband where he maintained a cordial relationship with Hussain Ahmad Madani.

== Career ==
After his father's death in 1952, Saleh inherited the leadership of Sarsina Darbar Sharif and the chairmanship of the Darussunnat Kamil Madrasa. Saleh supported Abdus Sattar, the Bangladesh Nationalist Party candidate for presidency in 1981. He headed the Bangladesh Jamate Hizbullah Hazrat and Bangladesh Jamate Ulema.

== Controversy ==
Saleh was awarded by the Government of Bangladesh with the Independence Day Award, the highest civilian honour, for his contribution to the education sector of Bangladesh in 1980. During this time, the Bangladesh Nationalist Party was in power. The Awami League government has thought of revoking this award as various government documents claim that Saleh was involved in crimes against humanity. Among them is the book "War of Independence of Bangladesh: Documents" (Vol. 7) and "Where are the killers and brokers of 1971", which give direct account of his crimes. It has also been said that he enjoyed friendly relations with the Pakistan Army during the war.

== Death ==
Saleh died on 13 February 1990, and was buried near his father in Sarsina.
