= Canning Purba Assembly constituency =

Constituency of the West Bengal Legislative Assembly, in India

Canning Purba
- Constituency No. 139 for the West Bengal Legislative Assembly
- Interactive Map Outlining Canning Purba Assembly Constituency

Constituency details
- Country: India
- Region: East India
- State: West Bengal
- District: South 24 Parganas
- Lok Sabha constituency: Jaynagar
- Established: 1957
- Total electors: 262,325
- Reservation: None

Member of Legislative Assembly
- 18th West Bengal Legislative Assembly
- Incumbent Mohammad Baharul Islam
- Party: AITC
- Alliance: AITC+
- Elected year: 2026

Canning Purba Assembly constituency is a Legislative Assembly constituency of South 24 Parganas district in the Indian State of West Bengal.

== Overview ==
As per order of the Delimitation Commission in respect of the Delimitation of constituencies in the West Bengal, Canning Purba Assembly constituency is composed of the following:

- Deuli-I, Deuli-II, Kalikatala, Matherdighi, Sarengabad, Tambuldaha-I and Tambuldaha-II gram panchayats of Canning II community development block
- Bodra, Chandaneswar-I, Chandaneswar-II, Durgapur, Shanksahar and Tarda gram panchayats of Bhangar I community development block

Canning Purba Assembly constituency is a part of No. 19 Jaynagar Lok Sabha constituency.

== Members of the Legislative Assembly ==
Year	Name	Party
Canning
1957	Khagendra Nath Naskar	Indian National Congress
1957	Abdus Shukur	Indian National Congress
1962	Khagendra Nath Naskar	Indian National Congress
1967	A. C. Halder	Bangla Congress
1969	Narayan Naskar	Indian National Congress
1971	Gobinda Chandra Naskar	Indian National Congress
1972	Gobinda Chandra Naskar	Indian National Congress
Canning Purba
1977	Abdur Razzak Molla	Communist Party of India (Marxist)
1982	Abdur Razzak Molla	Communist Party of India (Marxist)
1987	Abdur Razzak Molla	Communist Party of India (Marxist)
1991	Abdur Razzak Molla	Communist Party of India (Marxist)
1996	Abdur Razzak Molla	Communist Party of India (Marxist)
2001	Abdur Razzak Molla	Communist Party of India (Marxist)
2006	Abdur Razzak Molla	Communist Party of India (Marxist)
2011	Abdur Razzak Molla	Communist Party of India (Marxist)
2016	Saokat Molla	Trinamool Congress
2021	Saokat Molla	Trinamool Congress
2026	Md. Baharul Islam	Trinamool Congress

== Election results ==
=== 2026 ===
2026 West Bengal Legislative Assembly election: Canning Purba
Party	Candidate	Votes	%	±%
AITC	Mohammad Baharul Islam	148,687	61.53	▲8.99
AISF	Arabul Islam	56,733	23.48	▼6.29
BJP	Ashim Sapui	28,593	11.83	▼2.99
NOTA	None of the above	1,624	0.67	▼0.3
Majority		91,954	38.05	▲15.28
Turnout		241,664	97.96	▲9.24
AITC hold		Swing		

=== 2021 ===
2021 West Bengal Legislative Assembly election: Canning Purba
Party	Candidate	Votes	%	±%
AITC	Saokat Molla	122,301	52.54	▼7.02
AISF	Gazi Shahabuddin Siraji	69,294	29.77	
BJP	Kalipada Naskar	34,503	14.82	▲8.47
SUCI(C)	Rafik Akunje	2,686	1.15	▼0.17
NOTA	None of the above	2,267	0.97	
Majority		53,007	22.77	
Turnout		232,766	88.72	
AITC hold		Swing		

=== 2016 ===
2016 West Bengal Legislative Assembly election: Canning Purba
Party	Candidate	Votes	%	±%
AITC	Saokat Molla	115,264	59.56	New entry
CPI(M)	Ajijer Rahaman Molla	60,230	31.12	▼23.18
BJP	Sudarshan Goswami	12,293	6.35	▲4.11
NOTA	None of the above	3,193	1.65	New entry
SUCI(C)	Sujit Naskar	2,548	1.32	Steady
Majority		55,034	28.44	▲14.97
Turnout		1,93,528	87.70	▼2.89
AITC gain from CPI(M)		Swing		

=== 2011 ===
2011 West Bengal Legislative Assembly election: Canning Purba
Party	Candidate	Votes	%	±%
CPI(M)	Abdur Razzak Molla	85,105	54.30	
INC	Ibrahim Molla	63,992	40.83	
BJP	Ghanashyam Mondal	3,503	2.24	
SUCI(C)	Eahia Akhand	2,074	1.32	
SDPI	Anisur Rahaman	1,179	0.75	
BSP	Mahim Chandra Sardar	874	0.56	
Majority		21,113	13.47	
Turnout		1,56,727	90.59	
CPI(M) hold		Swing		

=== 2006 ===
Abdur Razzak Molla of CPI(M) has represented the Canning Purba Assembly constituency from 1977 to 2006. He defeated his nearest rivals, Amirul Islam of AITC in 2006, Mujibar Rahman Kayal of INC in 2001, Akram Laskar of INC in 1996, Abdus Sattar Molla of INC in 1991, Amar Nath Bandopadhyay of INC in 1987, Ahammad Nuruzzaman of INC in 1982 and Osman Gani of INC in 1977.

=== 1972 ===
Gobinda Chandra Naskar of INC won the Canning Assembly constituency in 1972 and 1971. Narayan Naskar of INC won in 1969. A.C.Halder of Bangla Congress won in 1967. Khagendra Nath Naskar of INC won in 1962. In 1957, Canning Assembly constituency had joint seats. Khagendra Nath Naskar and Abdus Shukur, both of INC, won. The seat did not exist prior to that.
