= Ahmed Ali Enayetpuri =

Bengali politician

Shams al-ʿUlamāʾ Khān Bahādur Mawlānā Ahmed Ali Enayetpuri
- আহমদ আলী এনায়েতপুরী

Member of the Bengal Legislative Assembly
- In office 1938–1945
- Succeeded by: Tofazzel Hossain
- Constituency: Jhenaidah

Personal life
- Born: Ahmed Ali; 21 January 1898 Enayetpur, Jessore District, Bengal Presidency, British India
- Died: 4 January 1959 (aged 60) Enayetpur, Jhenaidah, Jessore District, East Bengal, Pakistan
- Political party: All-India Muslim League

Religious life
- Religion: Islam
- Denomination: Sunni
- Jurisprudence: Hanafi
- Tariqa: Silsila-e-Furfura

Muslim leader
- Teacher: Mohammad Abu Bakr Siddique

Ahmed Ali Enayetpuri (Bengali: আহমদ আলী এনায়েতপুরী) was a Bengali writer, journalist, and politician.

== Early life and education ==
Ahmed Ali was born on 21 January 1898, to a Bengali Muslim family in the village of Enayetpur in Jessore District, Bengal Presidency. The family had Iraqi ancestry. His father, Shah Abed Ali (d. 1956), was a Mawlana and his mother's name was Sayeda Khatun.

He studied at the Shajiali Lower Primary School under Pandit Dvijabar Charkabarti and others. After that he enrolled at the Jessore District School, studying until class 8. His father realised Ali's lack of interest and enrolled him at the Calcutta Alia Madrasa instead. In Calcutta, Ali completed Islamic studies and learnt Arabic under Mawlana Gul Muhammad Khan and Mawlana Bashir Ahmad. However, instead of completing his studies at the madrasa, Ali came under the influence of Mohammad Abu Bakr Siddique, the inaugural Pir of Furfura Sharif. Siddique taught him Islamic theology, Persian and Urdu. Enayetpuri later self-learned English too and was conferred the title of Shamsul Ulama. Not long after his studies, his pir instructed him to give public speeches, calling towards Islam.

== Career ==
Enayetpuri founded Sariat (also spelled Sariyat), a monthly magazine, in 1924 and became its editor. He renamed the newspaper Sariat-i-Islam. It was the sole Hanafi publication in Kolkata. It was dogmatic. He served as the editor of the Sariat-i-Islam for 32 years. In 1934, the British Raj awarded him the title of Khan Sahib. He served as a member of the Jessore District Board.

In 1937 he was elected to the Bengal Legislative Assembly from Jhenaidah constituency as a candidate of the All India Muslim League. In the assembly he introduced a bill to make primary education free. He was awarded the title of Khan Bahadur in 1938.

== Death ==
Enayetpuri died on 4 January 1959 in Enayetpur, Jessore District, East Bengal, Pakistan.
