= Baharul Islam (disambiguation) =

Baharul Islam (1918–1993) was a judge in the Supreme Court of India.

Bahar ul Islam (Arabic: بهار الإسلام) is an Arabic name. It may also refer to:

- Baharul Islam, Indian actor
- K M Baharul Islam, Indian academic
- Md. Baharul Islam (born 1988), Indian politician
