= Baba Umer Dargah =

Islamic shrine in Solapur, India

The Baba Umer Dargah (Urdu: بابا امر درگاہ) is a famous Islamic shrine in Solapur, India. It is known for a baby throwing ritual, in which infants are dropped from a 15-meter platform onto a cloth held by both Muslim and Hindu men. This practice is five to seven hundred years old; it is said to originate when a pir "advised people whose babies were dying to build a shrine and drop the ailing infants from the roof to show their trust in the almighty" and after doing so, "the babies were miraculously cradled to safety in a hammock-like sheet that appeared in midair."
