= Anti-intellectualism =

Hostility to and mistrust of education, philosophy, art, literature, and science

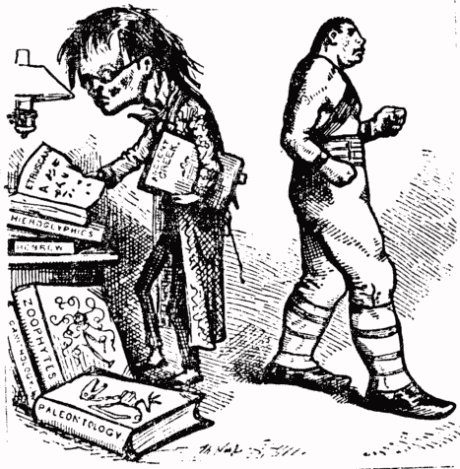
Anti-intellectualism contrasts the reedy scholar with the bovine boxer; the comparison epitomizes the populist view of reading and study as antithetical to sport and athleticism. In this image, the heads and bodies are disproportionate, with the size of the head representing mental ability and the size of the body representing physical ability. (Thomas Nast)

Anti-intellectualism refers to a range of attitudes, characterized by skepticism, mistrust or criticism of intellect, intellectuals, or intellectualism. It is commonly expressed as questioning the value or relevance of intellectual pursuits, including education and philosophy, and the dismissal of art, literature, history, and science as impractical, politically motivated, and even contemptible human endeavours. Anti-intellectuals may present themselves and be perceived as champions of common folk—populists against political and academic elitism—and tend to see educated people as a status class that dominates political discourse and higher education while being detached from the concerns of ordinary people.

Totalitarian governments have, in the past, manipulated and applied anti-intellectualism to repress political dissent. During the Spanish Civil War (1936–1939) and the following dictatorship (1939–1975) of Francisco Franco, the reactionary repression of the White Terror (1936–1945) was notably anti-intellectual, with most of the 200,000 civilians killed being the Spanish intelligentsia, the politically active teachers and academics, artists and writers of the deposed Second Spanish Republic (1931–1939). During the Cambodian genocide (1975–1979), the totalitarian regime of Cambodia led by Pol Pot nearly destroyed its entire educated population.

Anti-intellectualism manifests in various forms across cultures and historical periods and is influenced by complex social dynamics. It can stem from a distrust of elites or institutions perceived as disconnected from everyday experiences, concerns about cultural identity, or competition in valuing practical knowledge over theoretical or academic expertise. As such, psychological research suggests that certain individuals with anti-intellectual attitudes could sometimes lean towards a display of confidence in their personal experiences rather than trusting authorities, while others adopt their anti-intellectual positions as a reaction to perceived threats to their social status or group identity.

Anti-intellectualism has long been exhibited in political rhetoric, with research showing that politicians incorporate appeals to common sense into idealized conceptions of leadership, portray references to complexity and expertise as illegitimate ploys, and cultivate a low-epistemic style of political performance.

The topic of anti-intellectualism has become a more widely discussed phenomenon in recent years, particularly due to its role in shaping public perception of expertise in science and education. This has led to widespread skepticism of scientific experts and advancements, raising questions about the dangers of anti-intellectualism in public health. The increasing use of anti-intellectualism in politics can be seen in modern society, such as the anti-vax movement.

== Ideological anti-intellectualism ==
The new rulers of Cambodia call 1975 "Year Zero", the dawn of an age in which there will be no families, no sentiment, no expressions of love or grief, no medicines, no hospitals, no schools, no books, no learning, no holidays, no music, no song, no post, no money – only work and death.

— John Pilger, Year Zero: The Silent Death of Cambodia (1979)

In the 20th century, societies systematically removed intellectuals from power to expediently end public political dissent. During the Cold War (1945–1991), the Czechoslovak Socialist Republic (1948–1990) ostracized the playwright Václav Havel as politically unreliable and unworthy of ordinary people's trust; the anti-communist Velvet Revolution of 1989 elected Havel president. Ideologically-extreme dictatorships who mean to recreate a society such as the Khmer Rouge rule of Cambodia (1975–1979) pre-emptively killed potential political opponents, especially the educated middle-class and the intelligentsia. To realize the Year Zero of Cambodian history, Khmer Rouge social engineering restructured the economy by de-industrialization and assassinated non-communist Cambodians suspected of "involvement in free-market activities" such as the urban professionals of society (physicians, attorneys, engineers, et al.) and people with political connections to foreign governments. The doctrine of Pol Pot identified the farmers as the true proletariat of Cambodia and the true representatives of the working class entitled to hold government power, hence the anti-intellectual purges.

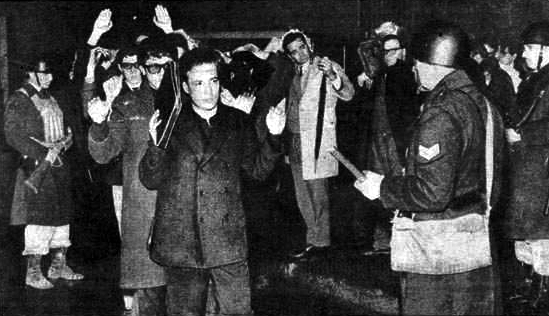
In the Night of the Long Batons (29 July 1966), the federal police physically purged politically incorrect academics who opposed the right-wing military dictatorship of Juan Carlos Onganía (1966–1970) in Argentina from five faculties of the University of Buenos Aires.

In 1966, the anti-communist Argentine military dictatorship of Juan Carlos Onganía (1966–1970) intervened at the University of Buenos Aires with the Night of the Long Batons to physically dislodge politically dangerous academics from five university faculties. That expulsion to the exile of the academic intelligentsia became a national brain drain upon the society and economy of Argentina. In opposition to the military repression of free speech, biochemist César Milstein said ironically: "Our country would be put in order, as soon as all the intellectuals who were meddling in the region were expelled."

== Academic anti-intellectualism ==
Galileo's trial by Artur Grottger. The Galileo affair is often portrayed as an example of the anti-intellectualistic side of religious fundamentalism within scientific circles.

In The Campus War (1971), the philosopher John Searle said,

[T]he two most salient traits of the radical movement are its anti-intellectualism and its hostility to the university as an institution. ... Intellectuals, by definition, are people who take ideas seriously for their own sake. Whether or not a theory is true or false is important to them, independently of any practical applications it may have. [Intellectuals] have, as Richard Hofstadter has pointed out, an attitude to ideas that is at once playful and pious. But, in the radical movement, the intellectual ideal of knowledge for its own sake is rejected. Knowledge is seen as valuable only as a basis for action, and it is not even very valuable there. Far more important than what one knows is how one feels.

In Social Sciences as Sorcery (1972), the sociologist Stanislav Andreski advised laymen to distrust the intellectuals' appeals to authority when they make questionable claims about resolving the problems of their society: "Do not be impressed by the imprint of a famous publishing house, or the volume of an author's publications. ... Remember that the publishers want to keep the printing presses busy, and do not object to nonsense if it can be sold."

In Science and Relativism: Some Key Controversies in the Philosophy of Science (1990), philosopher of science and epistemologist Larry Laudan said that the prevailing type of philosophy taught at universities in the U.S. (Postmodernism and Poststructuralism) is anti-intellectual, because "the displacement of the idea that facts and evidence matter, by the idea that everything boils down to subjective interests and perspectives is—second only to American political campaigns—the most prominent and pernicious manifestation of anti-intellectualism in our time."

== Distrust of intellectuals ==
In the U.S., the conservative American economist Thomas Sowell argued for distinctions between unreasonable and reasonable wariness of intellectuals in their influence upon the institutions of a society. In defining intellectuals as "people whose occupations deal primarily with ideas", Sowell conveys the view that they are different from people whose work is the practical application of ideas. Under this framework, the cause for layman's mistrust lies in the intellectuals' supposed incompetence outside their fields of expertise. The portrayed view is that, although having great working knowledge in their specialist fields when compared to other professions and occupations, the intellectuals of society could face little discouragement against speaking authoritatively beyond their field of formal expertise and thus are unlikely to face responsibility for the social and practical consequences of their errors. Hence, a physician is judged competent by the effective treatment of a patient's sickness, yet might face a medical malpractice lawsuit should the treatment harm the patient. In contrast, a tenured university professor is unlikely to be judged competent or incompetent by the effectiveness of their intellectualism (ideas) and thus not face responsibility for the social and practical consequences of the implementation of the ideas.

In Britain, the anti-intellectualism of the writer Paul Johnson derived from his close examination of twentieth-century history, which brought him to the conclusion that intellectuals have continually championed disastrous public policies for social welfare and public education, and warned the layman public to "beware [the] intellectuals. Not merely should they be kept well away from the levers of power, they should also be objects of suspicion when they seek to offer collective advice." In that vein, "In the Land of the Rococo Marxists" (2000), the American writer Tom Wolfe characterized the intellectual as "a person knowledgeable in one field, who speaks out only in others." In 2000, British publisher Imprint Academic published Dumbing Down, a compilation of essays edited by Ivo Mosley, grandson of the British fascist Oswald Mosley, which included essays on a perceived widespread anti-intellectualism by Jaron Lanier, Ravi Shankar, Robert Brustein, Michael Oakshott among others.

=== Discrimination ===
Discrimination of excellence is the violation of formal equality of opportunity and meritocracy, which reward merits of individuals and overachievement. Discrimination of excellence can be caused by different reasons, including legacy preferences, nepotism, substantive equality, affirmative action, ageism or random luck.

An example is when academics, teachers, and students were targeted during the Cambodian genocide. Khmer Rouge chose new teachers by ideology and not by teaching excellence, which resulted in high illiteracy. Gifted education has been criticized on substantive equality grounds.

Legacy preferences for college admissions have been criticized. Discrimination against excellent students during admissions to Ivy League has been debated during 2019 college admissions bribery scandal. The United States Department of Justice scrutinized higher education over potential systemic biases in college admission standards that would underweight transparent standardized testing criteria due to affirmative action. Harvard College has been sued in Students for Fair Admissions v. President and Fellows of Harvard College due to individuals outperforming on standardized college admission tests but not being admitted. Non-merit-based admissions practices, degree conferral or promotion standards have been criticized. Some universities perform affirmative action on men, in order to maintain a gender balance.

== In the United States ==
=== 17th century ===
In The Powring Out of the Seven Vials (1642), the Puritan John Cotton demonized intellectual men and women by saying that "the more learned and witty you bee, the more fit to act for Satan will you bee. ... Take off the fond doting ... upon the learning of the Jesuits, and the glorie of the Episcopacy, and the brave estates of the Prelates. I say bee not deceived by these pompes, empty shewes, and faire representations of goodly condition before the eyes of flesh and blood, bee not taken with the applause of these persons". Yet, not every Puritan concurred with Cotton's religious contempt for secular education, such as John Harvard, a major early benefactor of the university which now bears his name.

In The Quest for Cosmic Justice (2001), the economist Thomas Sowell said that anti-intellectualism in the U.S. began in the early Colonial era as an understandable wariness of the educated upper classes because the country mostly was built by people who had fled political and religious persecution by the social system of the educated upper classes. Moreover, few intellectuals possessed the practical hands-on skills required to survive in the New World of North America, which absence from society led to a deep-rooted, populist suspicion of men and women who specialize in "verbal virtuosity", rather than tangible, measurable products and services:

"From its colonial beginnings, American society was a "decapitated" society—largely lacking the top-most social layers of European society. The highest elites and the titled aristocracies had little reason to risk their lives crossing the Atlantic, and then face the perils of pioneering. Most of the white population of colonial America arrived as indentured servants and the black population as slaves. Later waves of immigrants were disproportionately peasants and proletarians, even when they came from Western Europe ... The rise of American society to pre-eminence, as an economic, political, and military power, was thus the triumph of the common man, and a slap across the face to the presumptions of the arrogant, whether an elite of blood or books."

=== 19th century ===
In U.S. history, the advocacy and acceptability of anti-intellectualism have varied, in part because the majority of Americans lived a rural life of arduous manual labor and agricultural work prior to the industrialization of the late nineteenth century. Therefore, academic education in the Greco–Roman classics was primarily perceived as having impractical value, and the bookish scholar deemed an unprofitable occupation. Yet, Americans of the nineteenth century were generally literate people who read Shakespeare for intellectual pleasure and the Christian Bible for emotional succor; thus, the ideal American was a literate and technically skilled man who was successful in his trade, ergo a productive member of society. Culturally, the ideal American was the self-made man whose knowledge derived from life-experience, not an intellectual man whose knowledge of the real world was derived from books, formal education, and academic study; thus, the justified anti-intellectualism reported in The New Purchase, or Seven and a Half Years in the Far West (1843), the Rev. Bayard R. Hall, A.M., said about frontier Indiana:

We always preferred an ignorant, bad man to a talented one, and, hence, attempts were usually made to ruin the moral character of a smart candidate; since, unhappily, smartness and wickedness were supposed to be generally coupled, and [like-wise] incompetence and goodness.

Yet, the "real-life" redemption of the egghead American intellectual was possible if he embraced the mores and values of mainstream society; thus, in the fiction of O. Henry, a character notes that once an East Coast university graduate "gets over" his intellectual vanity, he no longer thinks himself better than other men, realizing he makes just as good a cowboy as any other young man, despite his common-man counterpart being the slow-witted naïf of good heart, a pop culture stereotype from stage shows.

=== 20th–21st centuries ===
There is a cult of ignorance in the United States, and there has always been. The strain of anti-intellectualism has been a constant thread winding its way through our political and cultural life, nurtured by the false notion that democracy means that 'my ignorance is just as good as your knowledge'.

— Isaac Asimov, 1980

In 1912, New Jersey governor Woodrow Wilson described the battle:

What I fear is a government of experts. God forbid that, in a democratic country, we should resign the task and give the government over to experts. What are we for if we are to be scientifically taken care of by a small number of gentlemen who are the only men who understand the job?

In Anti-intellectualism in American Life (1963), the historian Richard Hofstadter said that anti-intellectualism is a social-class response by the middle-class "mob", against the privileges of the political elites. As the middle class developed political power, they exercised their belief that the ideal candidate to the office was the "self-made man", not the well-educated man born to wealth. The self-made man from the middle class could be trusted to act in the best interest of his fellow citizens. As evidence of this view, Hofstadter cited the derision of Adlai Stevenson as an "egghead". In Americans and Chinese: Passages to Differences (1980), Francis Hsu said that American egalitarianism is stronger in the United States than in Europe, e.g. in England,

English individualism developed hand in hand with legal equality. American self-reliance, on the other hand, has been inseparable from an insistence upon economic and social as well as political equality. The result is that a qualified individualism, with a qualified equality, has prevailed in England, but what has been considered the inalienable right of every American is unrestricted self-reliance and, at least ideally, unrestricted equality. The English, therefore, tend to respect class-based distinctions in birth, wealth, status, manners, and speech, while Americans resent them.

Such social resentment characterises contemporary political discussions about the socio-political functions of mass-communication media and science; that is, scientific facts, generally accepted by educated people throughout the world, are misrepresented as opinions in the U.S., specifically about climate science and global warming.

Miami University anthropology professor Homayun Sidky has argued that 21st-century anti-scientific and pseudoscientific approaches to knowledge, particularly in the United States, are rooted in a postmodernist "decades-long academic assault on science": "Many of those indoctrinated in postmodern anti-science went on to become conservative political and religious leaders, policymakers, journalists, journal editors, judges, lawyers, and members of city councils and school boards. Sadly, they forgot the lofty ideals of their teachers, except that science is bogus."

Anti-vaccine protestor from Ohio, USA protesting against mandatory COVID-19 vaccination.

In 2017, a Pew Research Center poll revealed that a majority of American Republicans thought colleges and universities had a negative impact on the United States. During the first and second Trump administrations, fake news and alternative facts became central pillars of discourse in the United States. In 2019, academics Adam Waters and E.J. Dionne stated that Trump "campaigned for the presidency and continues to govern as a man who is anti-intellectual, as well as anti-fact and anti-truth." In 2020, Trump signed an executive order banning anti-racism bias trainings from offices of federal agencies, grant programs, and federal contractors as part of a larger strategy to combat a perceived progressive academic bias, like emphases on the political legacy of American slavery, with "patriotic education" instead. As a result of the firing of researchers, attacks on colleges, and turning away of already-educated adult immigrants, some have declared a United States brain drain in effect since the 2010s.

==== Education and knowledge ====
The U.S. ranks at a middling quality of education compared to other countries, and Americans often lack basic knowledge and skills. John Traphagan of the University of Texas attributes this to a culture of anti-intellectualism, noting that nerds and other intellectuals are often stigmatized in American schools and popular culture. At universities, student anti-intellectualism has resulted in the social acceptability of cheating on schoolwork, especially in the business schools, a manifestation of ethically expedient cognitive dissonance rather than of academic critical thinking.

The American Council on Science and Health said that denialism of the facts of climate science and of climate change misrepresents verifiable data and information as political opinion. Anti-intellectualism puts scientists in the public view and forces them to align with either a liberal or a conservative political stance. Moreover, 53% of Republican U.S. Representatives and 74% of Republican senators deny the scientific facts of the causes of climate change.

In the rural U.S., anti-intellectualism is an essential feature of the religious culture of Christian fundamentalism. Mainline Protestant churches and the Roman Catholic Church have directly published their collective support for political action to counter climate change, whereas Southern Baptists and Evangelicals have denounced belief in both evolution and climate change as a sin, and have dismissed scientists as intellectuals attempting to create "Neo-nature paganism". People of fundamentalist religious belief tend to report not seeing evidence of global warming.

== In Europe ==
=== Soviet Union ===
The remains of the Helsinki University of Technology after being bombed by the Soviet Army during the Winter War.

In the first decade after the Russian Revolution of 1917, the Bolsheviks suspected the Tsarist intelligentsia as having the potential to betray the proletariat. Thus, the initial Soviet government consisted of men and women without much formal education. Moreover, the deposed propertied classes were termed Lishentsy ("the disenfranchised"), whose children were excluded from education. Eventually, some 200 Tsarist intellectuals such as writers, philosophers, scientists and engineers were deported to Germany on philosophers' ships in 1922 while others were deported to Latvia and Turkey in 1923.

During the revolutionary period, the pragmatic Bolsheviks employed "bourgeois experts" to manage the economy, industry, and agriculture and so learn from them. After the Russian Civil War (1917–1922), to achieve socialism the Soviet Union (1922–91) emphasized literacy and education in service to modernizing the country via an educated working class intelligentsia rather than an Ivory Tower intelligentsia. During the 1930s and 1950s, Joseph Stalin replaced Vladimir Lenin's intelligentsia with an intelligentsia that was loyal to him and believed in a specifically Soviet world view, thereby producing the pseudoscientific theories of Lysenkoism and Japhetic theory.

In October 1937, there was a mass extermination of Belarusian writers, artists and statespeople by the Soviet Union occupying authorities. This event marked the peak of the Great Purge and repressions of Belarusians in the Soviet-controlled area of eastern Belarus. More than 100 notable persons were executed, most of them on the night of 29–30 October 1937. Their innocence was later admitted by the Soviet Union after Joseph Stalin's death.

At the beginning of World War II, the Soviet secret police carried out mass executions of the Polish intelligentsia and military leadership in the 1940 Katyn massacre.

=== Fascism ===
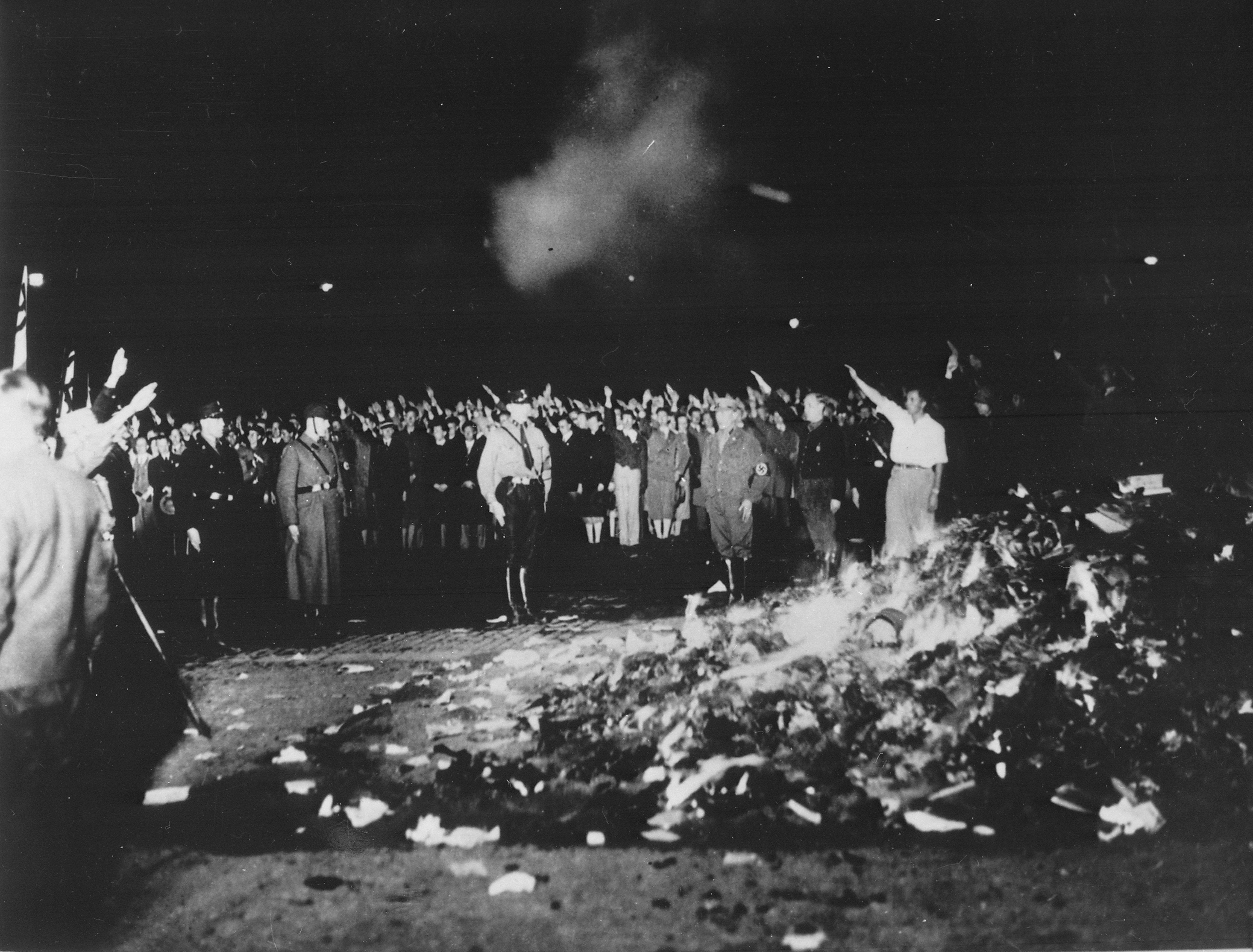
University students in Berlin making the Nazi salute while "offensive" books were burnt in the Bebelplatz in 1933.

The idealist philosopher Giovanni Gentile established the intellectual basis of Fascist ideology with the autoctisi (self-realisation) that distinguished between the good (active) intellectual and the bad (passive) intellectual:

Fascism combats [...] not intelligence, but intellectualism, [...] which is [...] a sickness of the intellect, [...] not a consequence of its abuse, because the intellect cannot be used too much. [...] [I]t derives from the false belief that one can segregate oneself from life.

— Giovanni Gentile, addressing a Congress of Fascist Culture, Bologna, 30 March 1925

To counter the "passive intellectual" who used their intellect abstractly, and was therefore "decadent", he proposed the "concrete thinking" of the active intellectual who applied intellect as praxis—a "man of action", like the Fascist Benito Mussolini, versus the decadent Communist intellectual Antonio Gramsci. The passive intellectual stagnates intellect by objectifying ideas, thus establishing them as objects. Hence the Fascist rejection of materialist logic, because it relies upon a priori principles improperly counter-changed with a posteriori ones that are irrelevant to the matter-in-hand in deciding whether or not to act.

In the praxis of Gentile's concrete thinking criteria, such consideration of the a priori toward the properly a posteriori constitutes impractical, decadent intellectualism. Moreover, this fascist philosophy occurred parallel to Actual Idealism, his philosophic system; he opposed intellectualism for its being disconnected from the active intelligence that gets things done, i.e. thought is killed when its constituent parts are labelled, and thus rendered as discrete entities.

Related to this is the confrontation between the Spanish Francoist General José Millán-Astray and the writer Miguel de Unamuno during the Dia de la Raza celebration at the University of Salamanca in 1936, during the Spanish Civil War. The General exclaimed: ¡Muera la inteligencia! ¡Viva la Muerte! ("Death to the intelligentsia! Long live death!"); the Falangists applauded.

== In Asia ==
=== China ===
==== Imperial China ====
Qin Shi Huang (246–210 BC), the first Emperor of unified China, consolidated political thought, and power, by suppressing freedom of speech at the suggestion of Chancellor Li Si, who justified such anti-intellectualism by accusing the intelligentsia of falsely praising the emperor, and dissenting through libel. From 213 to 206 BC, it was generally thought that the works of the Hundred Schools of Thought were incinerated, especially the Shi Jing (Classic of Poetry, c. 1000 BC) and the Shujing (Classic of History, c. 6th century BC). The exceptions were books by Qin historians, and books of Legalism, an early type of totalitarianism—and the Chancellor's philosophic school (see the Burning of books and burying of scholars). However, upon further inspection of Chinese historical annals such as the Shi Ji and the Han Shu, this was found not to be the case. The Qin Empire privately kept one copy of each of these books in the Imperial Library but it publicly ordered that the books should be banned. Those who owned copies were ordered to surrender the books to be burned; those who refused were executed. This eventually led to the loss of most ancient works of literature and philosophy when Xiang Yu burned down the Qin palace in 208 BC.

==== People's Republic of China ====
The Cultural Revolution (1966–1976) was a politically violent decade which saw wide-ranging social engineering throughout the People's Republic of China by its leader Chairman Mao Zedong. After several national policy crises during which he was motivated by his desire to regain public prestige and control of the Chinese government, Mao announced on 16 May 1966 that the Chinese Communist Party (CCP) and Chinese society were permeated with liberal bourgeois elements who meant to restore capitalism to China and he also announced that people could only be removed after a post–revolutionary class struggle was waged against them. To that effect, China's youth nationally organized themselves into Red Guards and hunted the "liberal bourgeois" elements who were supposedly subverting the CCP and Chinese society. The Red Guards acted nationally, purging the country, the military, urban workers and the leaders of the CCP. The Red Guards were particularly aggressive when they attacked their teachers and professors, causing most schools and universities to be shut down once the Cultural Revolution began. Three years later in 1969, Mao declared that the Cultural Revolution was ended, yet the political intrigues continued until 1976, concluding with the arrest of the Gang of Four, the de facto end of the Cultural Revolution.

=== Democratic Kampuchea ===
When the Communist Party of Kampuchea and the Khmer Rouge (1951–1981) established their regime as Democratic Kampuchea (1975–1979) in Cambodia, their anti-intellectualism which idealised the country and demonised the cities was immediately imposed on the country in order to establish agrarian socialism, thus, they emptied cities in order to purge the Khmer nation of every traitor, enemy of the state and intellectual, often symbolised by eyeglasses.

=== India ===
India has witnessed a surge of anti-intellectual sentiment under the premiership of Narendra Modi, as a part of the right-wing populist narrative of the ruling Bharatiya Janata Party (BJP), which associates intellectualism with communism, Islamoleftism and Westernisation. The BJP-led government is closely aligned with Hindu nationalist ideology, known as Hindutva, and has made numerous attempts to revise curriculum to include Hindu religious elements in a phenomenon known as saffronisation. Ramachandra Guha, a vociferous critic of the Modi government's revisionist tactics, has labelled Modi's government as the most anti-intellectual the country has ever seen. In 2015, several highly renowned writers, academics and rationalists started returning government awards to raise awareness about rising communal violence in India, murder of minorities and rationalists, and alleged government silence, termed as 'award wapsi' protest. Modi himself has stated that he preferred 'hardwork over (degress from) Harvard' in response to the Nobel Laureate Amartya Sen's criticism of the demonetisation drive. In a significant break with tradition, the Modi government also refused to felicitate the Indian-American Nobel Laureate Abhijit Banerjee, who was instead denounced by Cabinet Minister Piyush Goyal for his left-wing credentials. Academic freedom is also observed to be declining under the BJP-led government, with India ranking in bottom 10% of all countries according to academic freedom index by V-Dem in 2025. Scholars at Risk, an international network of over 650 academic institutes and organizations, publishes an annual report under its academic freedom monitoring project, that claims that the BJP-led government was exerting political control of academic institutions and considered India as "completely restricted" which is the worst score it received since 1940s after consistent decline in the index from 2013-2026.

There are also several instances of political violence in institutes and intimidation of academic, which has also including prominent ministers of the state for example in West Bengal, a state renowned for its culture of intellectualism, where its state cabinet minister Dilip Ghosh directed BJP cadres to physically assault intellectuals opposed to the newly formed Suvendu Adhikary ministry by throwing eggs at them, whereas Adhikari himself led a rally consisting of sadhus and BJP cadres to Jadavpur University in order to intimidate the predominant left-wing student activists of the campus, whom he accused of spreading anti-Hindu and anti-Indian sentiments. The incident led to violent clash on Jadavpur University campus primarily between RSS-affiliated ABVP student body, right-wing outfits that barged onto campus and communist-aligned student bodies like the SFI, DYFI and AISF. The incident is criticized for ineffective action by police officials, denial of incidents by the Adhikary administration, and violence related to saffronisation of institutes.

In 2026, Modi has denounced the youth protestors in various instances addressing the nation, referring to those involved in the 2026 NEET scandal protests and anti-CEC protests, as "dimagi (intellectual in Hindi) Naxals" which is a reference to the early days of the Naxalite-Maoist insurgency when students in Kolkata radicalized into far-left ideology clashed with state agencies in the aftermath of the Naxalbari uprising.

=== Ottoman Empire ===
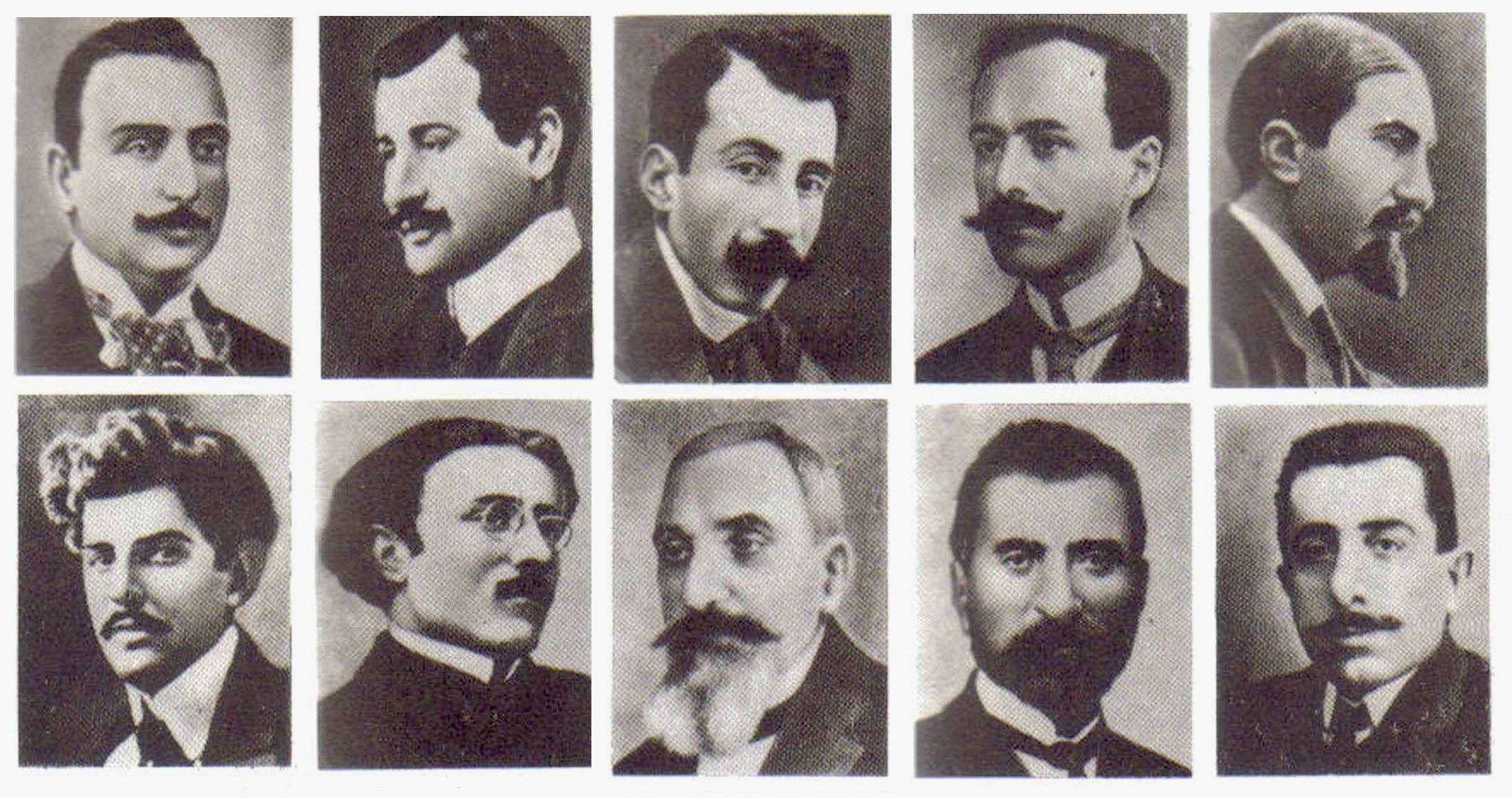
Some of the Armenian intellectuals who were detained, deported, and killed in the Armenian genocide of 1915

Destruction of the Constantinople observatory of Taqi ad-Din in 1580 occurred in the backdrop of a large-scale anti-intellectual turn of the Ottoman Empire (later consolidated under the umbrella of the Kadizadeli movement), leading to its stagnation.

In the early stages of the Armenian genocide of 1915, around 2,300 Armenian intellectuals were deported from Constantinople (Istanbul) and most of them were subsequently murdered by the Ottoman government. The event has been described by historians as a decapitation strike, the purpose of which was intended to deprive the Armenian population of an intellectual leadership and a chance to resist.

=== Pakistan ===
A scene from a madrassa in Pakistan from 2009 of students being trained in jihad instead of academic studies. Such Pakistani madrassas have been described as being the recruitment grounds for extremist groups operating in neighbouring countries, the most notable being the Taliban.

Pakistani Nobel Laureate Dr. Abdus Salam continues to be denounced even after his death by the Pakistani government due to his Ahmaddiya faith, as the Second Amendment to the Constitution of Pakistan declared Ahmaddiyas as kafirs. Spread of scientific education was significantly hampered under the presidency of Zia-ul-Haq, under whom the centre of education shifted away from government run schools to madrassas, which has been accused of indoctrinating students into religious extremism, discrimination and anti-Indian sentiments. This continues to impact the country to this day, as governments continue to deliberately underfund schools in favour of madrassas while at the same time replacing and minimising secular content in madrassa textbooks in order to sustain Islamisation.

=== Muslim world ===
Entrance of the Comilla Public Library in Comilla. This and its affiliated Ramamala Library were burnt down by Islamists during the 2024 July Revolution

Anti-scientific and anti-intellectual attitudes are a widespread phenomenon across the multiple countries of the Muslim world, caused largely due to the rise of Islamism following the 1979 Iranian revolution. Ruhollah Khomeini, when questioned about his mismanagement of Iran's economy, had famously replied back by saying "Economics is for the donkeys". The parallel propagation of Wahhabism resulting in Islamic revivalism among many Muslim societies is also considered to be a contributing factor for the declining interest in secular pursuits among Muslims. Others argue that the institutionalisation of anti-intellectual attitudes in the Muslim world can be traced back to the fatwa against the printing press issued by the Ottoman Sultan Selim I in his capacity as Caliph, effectively isolating the Muslim world from the emerging Scientific Revolution and Enlightenment ideals of Europe, which were denounced by the ulema as bid'ah. When these same ideals were disseminated among Muslims under colonial rule, they were tied to Westernisation, thereby evoking widespread opposition and anti-colonial sentiments in the Islamic world.

== See also ==
- Antiscience – attitudes that reject science and the scientific method
- Book burning - an activity often deemed as an external manifestation of anti-intellectualism
- Conspiracy theory – attributing events to secret plots instead of more reasonable explanation
- Counter-Enlightenment, not to be confused with the more recent Dark Enlightenment – Various intellectual stances against mainstream attitudes of the 18th-century Enlightenment
- Cultural genocide generally – imperial strategy, wherein destroying a society's epistemic elite makes subduing it much easier;
- Discrimination of excellence
- Dumbing down – deliberate oversimplification of intellectual content
- Equality of outcome or Substantive equality as distinct from equal opportunity
- Harrison Bergeron – 1961 short story by Kurt Vonnegut
- Just-world fallacy
- Legacy preferences
- List of destroyed libraries
- Luddite – an individual who opposes or resists the use of new technology
- Myth of meritocracy
- Noble savage – a stock character
- Philistinism – hostility to intellect, art and beauty
- Populism – when the democratic ethos moves into places which it is purported not to belong in; paradigmatically academic research
- Ressentiment – a tendency to reflexively detract from others, e.g. as regards their greater, implicitly perceived, intelligence; as chiefly described by Nietzsche and Scheler
- Law of Jante
- Merit, excellence, and intelligence (MEI) – a framework that emphasizes the selection of candidates solely based on their merits, achievements, skills, abilities, intelligence and contributions
- Tall poppy syndrome
