= Nesarabad Upazila =

Nesarabad নেছারাবাদ Swarupkati
- Upazila
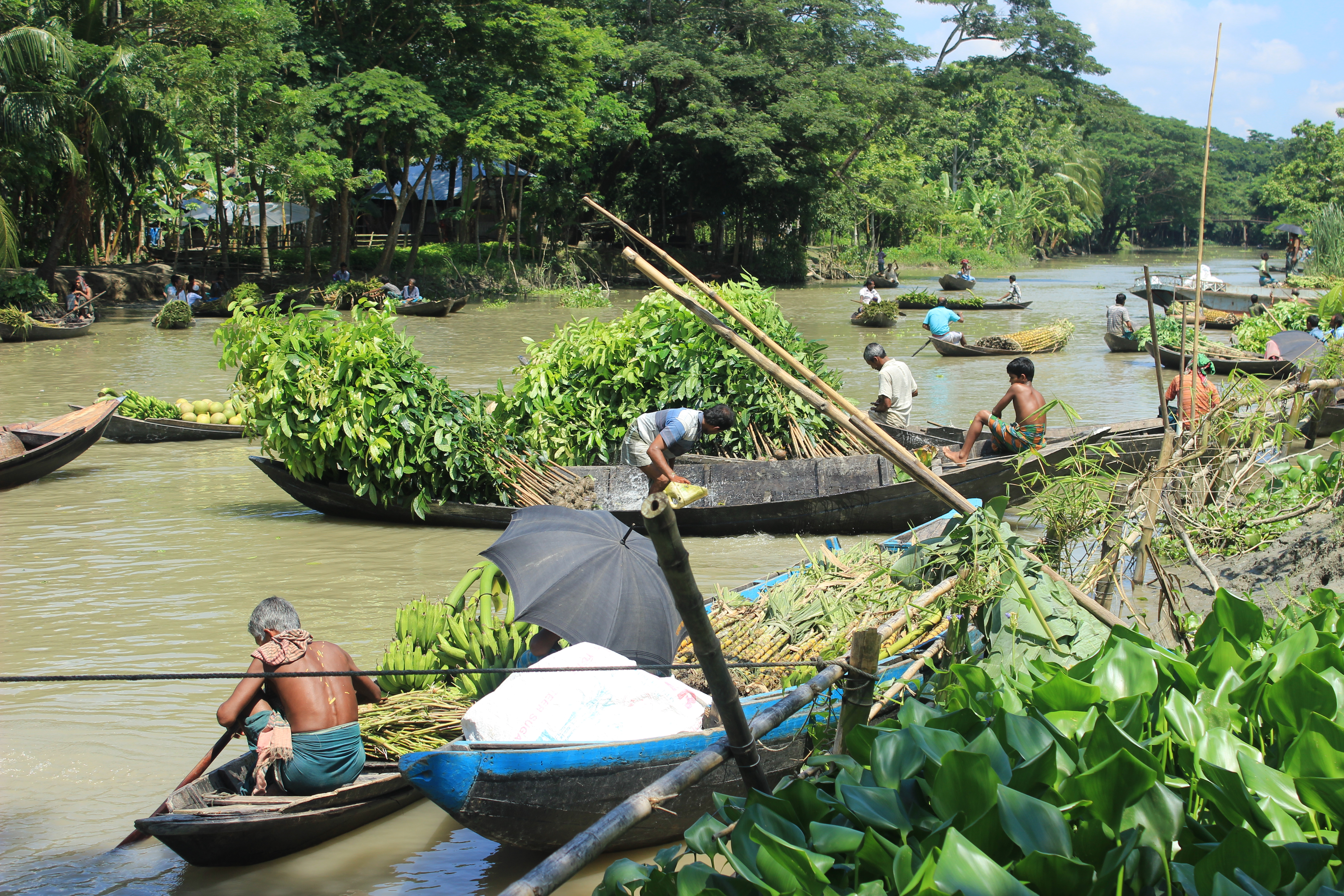
- Guava market in Nesarabad upazila

- Coordinates: 22°44.8′N 90°6.2′E
- Country: Bangladesh
- Division: Barisal Division
- District: Pirojpur District

Area
  - Total: 200.33 km^{2} (77.35 sq mi)

Population (2022)
  - Total: 230,976
  - Density: 1,153.0/km^{2} (2,986.2/sq mi)
- Time zone: UTC+6 (BST)
- Postal code: 8520
- Area code: 04627
- Website: nesarabad.pirojpur.gov.bd

Nesarabad Upazila mauza geocode map

Nesarabad, formerly called Swarupkati (Bengali: নেছারাবাদ) is an upazila of Pirojpur District in Barisal, Bangladesh. Nesarabad is named after Nesaruddin Ahmad, the founder of Sarsina Darbar Sharif. At present, guava gardens, floating market and backwaters of Nesarabad are turning into famous tourist attractions.

== Geography ==
Nesarabad is located at 22.7472°N 90.1036°E. It has a total area of 200.33 km^{2}.

== History ==
Nesarabad, formerly known as Swarupkati, has a recorded administrative history dating back to the early 20th century. Nesarabad Thana was established in 1906 and was upgraded to an upazila in 1983. In 1985, the upazila was officially renamed from Swarupkati to Nesarabad.

The area contains several sites of archaeological and historical significance, including the Gayebi Mosque and a three-domed mosque at Barchakatigram, the Sarkar Bari Pancharatna Math at Alangkarkati, the Chakrabarti Bari Mandir at Atghar Kuriana, and remnants of Rajbari structures at Kaurikhara and Ragbari, some dating back to the 18th century.

During the Bangladesh Liberation War, Nesarabad was the site of extensive atrocities. The Pakistan Army launched its first attack on the upazila on 11 May 1971. In May and June, with assistance from local collaborators (razakars), the army carried out widespread looting, arson, and killings in areas such as Miar Hat and Inder Hat, resulting in the deaths of around 100 people. On 10 November 1971, 18 civilians were tied and tortured to death at Barajkati Kachhari, and seven members of one family were killed earlier at Barajkati village under Sohagdal Union. Overall, approximately one thousand people were killed in the upazila during the war, with the most brutal massacre occurring at the Peara Bagan (guava garden) of Atghar Kuriana. After independence, about 300 human skulls were recovered from a ditch behind Kuriana College, indicating the scale of the killings. One mass grave and one mass killing site have been identified in the upazila, notably at Barchakati.

The region has also been affected by major natural disasters over time. The earthquake of 1762 significantly altered its geological formation by causing rivers to silt, while floods and cyclones between the late 18th and early 20th centuries caused extensive damage to settlements and livelihoods.

== Economy ==
The economy of Nesarabad Upazila is predominantly agrarian, with agriculture accounting for about 36.17% of employment. Major agricultural products include paddy, jute, sugarcane, wheat, pulses, betel leaf, onion, garlic, and a variety of vegetables. Fruit cultivation is also significant, particularly guava, banana, coconut, hog-plum, lemon, litchi, and betel nut. Some traditional crops, such as local varieties of paddy, kaun, and arahar, are now extinct or nearly extinct.

Commerce is the second-largest source of income, engaging approximately 30.05% of the workforce. Non-agricultural labor constitutes 8.96%, while services account for 7.19%. Small-scale industries and cottage industries play a limited but notable role, including coconut fiber processing, welding workshops, blacksmithing, bamboo work, and bidi manufacturing. Industrial employment overall remains low, at about 1.44%.

The upazila has 24 hats and bazars, which serve as key centers for trade, along with several annual fairs, some of which have religious and cultural significance. Main export items include coconut fiber products, guava, banana, coconut, betel leaf, betel nut, and hog-plum.

Land ownership is uneven, with about 59.88% of residents owning agricultural land and 40.12% being landless. Agricultural land ownership is higher in rural areas than in urban areas. All unions and wards are connected to the rural electrification network, though only about 26.55% of households have direct access to electricity, reflecting ongoing infrastructure and development challenges.

== Demographics ==
According to the 2022 Bangladeshi census, Nesarabad Upazila had 56,317 households and a population of 230,976. 8.47% of the population were under 5 years of age. Nesarabad had a literacy rate (age 7 and over) of 88.20%: 89.12% for males and 87.32% for females, and a sex ratio of 96.83 males for every 100 females. 27,516 (11.91%) lived in urban areas.

Religions in Nesarabad Upazila (2022)
Religion	Percent
Islam	80.49%
Hinduism	19.48%
Other or not stated	0.03%

Population by religion in Union/Paurashava
Union/Paurashava	Muslim	Hindu	Others
Swarupkathi Paurashava	21,026	2,338	2
Atghar Kuriana Union	9,283	9,215	14
Baldia Union	35,193	15,88	2
Daihari Union	4,730	5,544	0
Guarekha Union	7,307	6,189	1
Jalabari Union	10,765	8,060	23
Swarupkati Union	14,487	557	1
Samudaykathi Union	"7,487	6,319	24
Sarengkathi Union	10,355	2,988	9
Sohagdal Union	32,476	1,213	0
Sutiakati Union	"32,796	971	3

🟩 Muslim majority 🟧 Hindu majority According to the 2022 Bangladeshi census, Nesarabad Upazila had 48,492 households and a population of 211,032. 42,090 (19.94%) were under 10 years of age. Nesarabad has a literacy rate (age 7 and over) of 88.20%, compared to the national average of 51.8%, and a sex ratio of 1,033 females per 1,000 males. 48,024 (22.76%) lived in urban areas.

According to the 1991 Bangladesh census, Nesarabad had a population of 202,520. Males constituted 49.54% of the population, and females 50.46%. The population aged 18 or over was 107,488. Nesarabad had an average literacy rate of 50.8% (7+ years), compared to the national average of 32.4%.

== Administration ==
UNO: Moniruzzaman

Nesarabad Upazila is divided into Swarupkati Municipality and ten union parishads: Atghar Kuriana, Baldia, Daihari, Guarekha, Jalabari, Nesarabad, Sarengkathi, Sohagdal, Somudoykathi, and Sutiakathi. The union parishads are subdivided into 80 mauzas and 134 villages.

Swarupkati Municipality is subdivided into 9 wards and 9 mahallas.

== Notable people ==
- Nesaruddin Ahmad, Islamic scholar and first Pir of Sarsina
- Abu Zafar Mohammad Saleh, the 2nd Pir of Sarsina Darbar Sharif
- Enayet Hossain Khan, former MP
- Fakhrul Islam Khan, playwright and journalist
- Hashem Ali Khan, politician
- Shah Alam, former MP
- Sheikh Anne Rahman, politician
- Chittaranjan Sutar, former parliamentarian
- Khan Mohammad Salek, educator

== See also ==
- Upazilas of Bangladesh
- Districts of Bangladesh
- Divisions of Bangladesh
- Administrative geography of Bangladesh
