= AISF =

AISF may refer to:

- All India Students' Federation, a student organisation
- All India Secular Front, a political party in West Bengal
