= Bhangar Assembly constituency =

Legislative Assembly constituency in West Bengal, India

Bhangar
- Constituency No. 148 for the West Bengal Legislative Assembly
- Interactive Map Outlining Bhangar Vidhan Sabha Constituency

Constituency details
- Country: India
- Region: East India
- State: West Bengal
- District: South 24 Parganas
- Lok Sabha constituency: Jadavpur
- Established: 1951
- Total electors: 271,859
- Reservation: None

Member of Legislative Assembly
- 18th West Bengal Legislative Assembly
- Incumbent Md. Nawsad Siddiqui
- Party: AISF
- Alliance: LF
- Elected year: 2026

Bhangar Assembly constituency is a Legislative Assembly constituency of South 24 Parganas district in the Indian State of West Bengal.

Most Successful parties from Bhangar Assembly Constituency
1. Communist Party of India (Marxist) (5 times) 31.25 (29.4%)
2. Trinamool Congress (2 times) 12.5 (11.8%)
3. Indian National Congress (5 times) 31.25 (29.4%)
4. All India Secular Front (2 times) 12.5 (11.8%)
5. Others 18.75 (17.6%)

== Overview ==
As per order of the Delimitation Commission in respect of the Delimitation of constituencies in the West Bengal, Bhangar Assembly constituency is composed of the following:

- Jagulgachhi, Narayanpur and Pranganj gram panchayats of Bhangar I community development block
- Bhangar II community development block

Bhangar Assembly constituency is a part of No. 22 Jadavpur Lok Sabha constituency.

== Members of the Legislative Assembly ==
Year	Member	Party
1952	Hem Chandra Naskar	Indian National Congress
1952	Gangadhar Naskar	Communist Party of India
1957	Hem Chandra Naskar	Indian National Congress
1962	A. K. M. Ishaque	Indian National Congress
1967	A. Molla	Bangla Congress
1969	A. K. M. Ishaque	Indian National Congress
1971	A. K. M. Hassan Uzzaman	Independent
1972	Abdur Razzak Molla	Communist Party of India (Marxist)
1977	Daud Khan	Communist Party of India (Marxist)
1982	Daud Khan	Communist Party of India (Marxist)
1987	Abdur Razzak Molla	Communist Party of India (Marxist)
1991	Badal Jamadar	Communist Party of India (Marxist)
1996	Badal Jamadar	Communist Party of India (Marxist)
2001	Badal Jamadar	Communist Party of India (Marxist)
2006	Arabul Islam	Trinamool Congress
2011	Badal Jamadar	Communist Party of India (Marxist)
2016	Abdur Razzak Molla	Trinamool Congress
2021	Md. Nawsad Siddiqui	All India Secular Front
2026	Md. Nawsad Siddiqui	All India Secular Front

== Election results ==
Vote share of Winning candidates
2026	47.33%
2021	45.10%
2016	49.57%
2011	47.33%
2006	48.07%
2001	54.10%
1996	62.46%
1991	59.19%
1987	54.64%
1982	58.66%
1977	34.29%
1972	33.60%
1971	24.56%
1969	34.68%
1967	76.74%
1962	57.70%
1957	43.87%
1951	16.97%
1951	17.77%

=== 2026 ===
2026 West Bengal Legislative Assembly election: Bhangar
Party	Candidate	Votes	%	±%
AISF	Md. Nawsad Siddiqui (Note: ISF candidate was supported by CPI(M)-led Left Front)	126,555	47.33	
AITC	Saokat Molla	94,467	35.33	
BJP	Jayanta Gayen	30,177	11.29	
IND	Naosan Molla	5,968	2.23	
NOTA	None of the Above	1,595	0.60	
Majority		32,088	12.00	
Turnout		267,394	98.04	
AISF hold		Swing		

=== 2021 ===
2021 West Bengal Legislative Assembly election: Bhangar
Party	Candidate	Votes	%	±%
AISF	Md. Nawsad Siddiqui (Note: Indian Secular Front is an unregistered political party and it contested the election on the "Envelope" symbol and name of Bihar-based political party Rashtriya Secular Majlis Party (RSMP).)	109,237	45.10	
AITC	Karim Rezaul	83,086	34.31	
BJP	Soumi Hati	38,726	15.99	
CPI(ML)RS	Mirja Hasan	4,930	2.04	
NOTA	None of the Above	3,243	1.34	
IND	Noushar Ali Molla	1,303	0.54	
SUCI(C)	Tapan Ghosh	937	0.39	
IND	Ismail Molla	723	0.30	
Majority		26,151	10.79	
Turnout		242,185	89.07	
Swing to AISF from AITC		Swing		

=== 2016 ===
2016 West Bengal Legislative Assembly election: Bhangar
Party	Candidate	Votes	%	±%
AITC	Abdur Razzak Molla	102,087	49.57	
CPI(M)	Abdur Rasid Gazi	83,963	40.77	
BJP	Abani Kumar Mondal	9,563	4.64	
WPOI	Jalal Uddin Ahmed	4,039	1.96	
NOTA	None of the Above	2,423	1.18	
LJP	Ikbal Molla	2,048	0.99	
IND	Abdus Salam Molla (Raju)	1,804	0.88	
Majority		18,124	8.80	
Turnout		205,927	87.99	
Swing to AITC from CPI(M)		Swing		

=== 2011 ===
2011 West Bengal Legislative Assembly election: Bhangar
Party	Candidate	Votes	%	±%
CPI(M)	Badal Jamadar	81,965	47.33	
AITC	Arabul Islam	76,859	44.38	
IND	Md. Nannu Hossain	10,363	5.98	
BJP	Madhusudan Sanpui	4,006	2.31	
Majority		5,106	2.95	
Turnout		173,193	92.43	
Swing to CPI(M) from AITC		Swing		

=== 2006 ===
2006 West Bengal Legislative Assembly election: Bhangar
Party	Candidate	Votes	%	±%
AITC	Arabul Islam	71,990	48.07	
CPI(M)	Mosharaf Hossain Laskar	69,000	46.08	
IND	Siddiqullah Chowdhury	6,059	4.05	
LJP	Molla Shamsuzzaman	2,701	1.80	
Majority		2,990	1.99	
Turnout		149,750		
Swing to AITC from CPI(M)		Swing		

=== 2001 ===
2001 West Bengal Legislative Assembly election: Bhangar
Party	Candidate	Votes	%	±%
CPI(M)	Badal Zamadar	71,578	54.10	
AITC	Abdus Sattar Mollah	53,298	40.28	
BJP	Dr. Amir Ali Mollah	4,516	3.41	
INL	Hassan Shahidullah Ashrafi	2,915	2.20	
Majority		18,280	13.82	
Turnout		132,309	83.03	
CPI(M) hold		Swing		

=== 1996 ===
1996 West Bengal Legislative Assembly election: Bhangar
Party	Candidate	Votes	%	±%
CPI(M)	Badal Zamadar	81,180	62.46	
INC	Azibar Rahaman	43,120	33.18	
BJP	Kartick Ghosh	4,557	3.51	
IND	Chitta Ranjan Naskar	716	0.55	
IND	Nazrul Islam	395	0.30	
Majority		38,060	29.28	
Turnout		133,475	88.63	
CPI(M) hold		Swing		

=== 1991 ===
1991 West Bengal Legislative Assembly election: Bhangar
Party	Candidate	Votes	%	±%
CPI(M)	Badal Jamadar	64,987	59.19	
INC	Nuzuzzaman Molla	39,000	35.52	
BJP	Kanai Lal Mandal	5,273	4.80	
IND	Harendranath Pal	526	0.48	
Majority		25,987	23.67	
Turnout		112,260	84.83	
CPI(M) hold		Swing		

=== 1987 ===
1987 West Bengal Legislative Assembly election: Bhangar
Party	Candidate	Votes	%	±%
CPI(M)	Abdur Razzak Molla	51,266	54.64	
INC	Shaikh Sahidar Rahman	38,809	41.36	
IND	Manabendra Mondal	2,283	2.43	
IND	Amin Nurul	896	0.95	
IUML	Ibrahim Md. Khan	572	0.61	
Majority		12,457	13.28	
Turnout		95,357	83.20	
CPI(M) hold		Swing		

=== 1982 ===
1982 West Bengal Legislative Assembly election: Bhangar
Party	Candidate	Votes	%	±%
CPI(M)	Daud Khan	43,270	58.66	
INC	Seriful Alam Ishaque	28,876	39.15	
JP	Amir Ali Molla	1,616	2.19	
Majority		14,394	19.51	
Turnout		75,057	80.96	
CPI(M) hold		Swing		

=== 1977 ===
1977 West Bengal Legislative Assembly election: Bhangar
Party	Candidate	Votes	%	±%
CPI(M)	Daud Khan	14,680	34.29	
JP	Amir Ali Molla	13,632	31.85	
IND	Mochte Moni Hossain	6,145	14.36	
CPI	Loteman Ali Molla	4,918	11.49	
INC	Abdul Jalil Molla	3,174	7.41	
IUML	Saukat Ali	257	0.60	
Majority		1,048	2.44	
Turnout		43,649	54.73	
CPI(M) hold		Swing		

=== 1972 ===
1972 West Bengal Legislative Assembly election: Bhangar
Party	Candidate	Votes	%	±%
CPI(M)	Abdur Razzak Molla	13,459	33.60	
INC	Md Nuruzzaman	11,593	28.94	
IUML	Molla Mohammed Yunus	10,951	27.34	
IND	Sunilkrishna Debnath	3,707	9.26	
IND	Rabindra Nath Kar Roy	344	0.86	
Majority		1,866	4.66	
Turnout		40,985	52.05	
Swing to CPI(M) from Independent		Swing		

=== 1971 ===
1971 West Bengal Legislative Assembly election: Bhangar
Party	Candidate	Votes	%	±%
IND	A. K. M. Hassan Uzzaman	10,868	24.56	
CPI(M)	Abdur Razzak Molla	10,415	23.54	
CPI	Lateman Ali Molla	10,415	23.54	
INC	Mochtesham Hossain	7,343	16.60	
INC(O)	Amir Ali Molla	4,344	9.82	
BAC	Ebrahim Ali Molla	859	1.94	
Majority		453	1.02	
Turnout		46,904	60.06	
Swing to Independent from INC		Swing		

=== 1969 ===
1969 West Bengal Legislative Assembly election: Bhangar
Party	Candidate	Votes	%	±%
INC	A. K. M. Ishaque	16,583	34.68	
LKD	Amir Ali Molla	13,610	28.46	
BAC	Molla Ebrahim Ali	11,382	23.80	
IND	Prabir Sarkar	4,289	8.97	
PML	Moulana Abdul Khaleque	1,613	3.37	
INDF	Sanat Roy	345	0.72	
Majority		2,973	6.22	
Turnout		48,803	65.05	
Swing to INC from Bangla Congress		Swing		

=== 1967 ===
1967 West Bengal Legislative Assembly election: Bhangar
Party	Candidate	Votes	%	±%
BAC	A. Molla	35,048	76.74	
INC	Sukurali	10,623	23.26	
Majority		24,425	53.48	
Turnout		47,728	63.87	
Swing to Bangla Congress from INC		Swing		

=== 1962 ===
1962 West Bengal Legislative Assembly election: Bhangar
Party	Candidate	Votes	%	±%
INC	A. K. M. Isahaque	30,320	57.70	
IND	Samir Kumar Sircar	12,057	22.94	
CPI	Lateman Ali Molla	7,479	14.23	
PSP	Anil Ghosh	1,335	2.54	
SWA	Mojammel Hossain	1,191	2.27	
IND	Shekh Habibar Rahaman	170	0.32	
Majority		18,263	34.76	
Turnout		54,879	67.37	
INC hold		Swing		

=== 1957 ===
1957 West Bengal Legislative Assembly election: Bhangar
Party	Candidate	Votes	%	±%
INC	Hem Chandra Naskar	16,302	43.87	
IND	Mazammel Hussain	10,576	28.46	
CPI	Latemanali Mollah	10,279	27.66	
Majority		5,726	15.41	
Turnout		37,157	46.01	

=== 1951 ===
1951 West Bengal Legislative Assembly election: Bhangar
Party	Candidate	Votes	%	±%
INC	Hemchandra Naskar	16,943	17.77	
CPI	Gangadhar Naskar	16,176	16.97	
CPI	Khagendra Kumar Roy Choudhury	15,436	16.19	
IND	Mozamel Hossain Shaik	12,347	12.95	
INC	Hridoy Bhusan Chakravorty	11,970	12.55	
IND	Hari Kumar Chakravorty	5,973	6.26	
IND	Shahadat Ali	4,500	4.72	
ABJS	Ananta Kumar Roy Sardar	4,179	4.38	
ABJS	Kishori Mohan Bhattacharjee	3,939	4.13	
IND	Rajani Kanto Naskar	2,095	2.20	
IND	Haridas Mondal	1,790	1.88	
Majority		767	0.80	
Turnout		95,348	86.92	
