= Badal Jamadar =

Indian politician

MLA of Bhangar Vidhan Sabha constituency
- In office 20 June 1991 – 12 May 2006
- Preceded by: Abdur Razzak Molla
- Succeeded by: Arabul Islam
- In office 13 May 2011 – 19 May 2016
- Preceded by: Arabul Islam
- Succeeded by: Abdur Razzak Molla

Personal details
- Born: 5 August 1940
- Died: 28 March 2020 (aged 79)
- Party: Communist Party of India (Marxist)
- Spouse: Rizia Bibi

Badal Jamadar is an Indian teacher and politician. He was elected as MLA of Bhangar Vidhan Sabha Constituency in West Bengal Legislative Assembly in 1991, 1996, 2001 and 2011.
