= Baldia =

Baldia (Urdu: بلدیہ) may refer to:

- The Urdu language word meaning municipal administration:
  - Baldia Town (Urdu: بلدیہ ٹائون) in the City of Karachi
  - Baldia, Bangladesh
- Baldia (worm), a genus in the family Capitellidae
