= Saokat Molla =

Indian politician

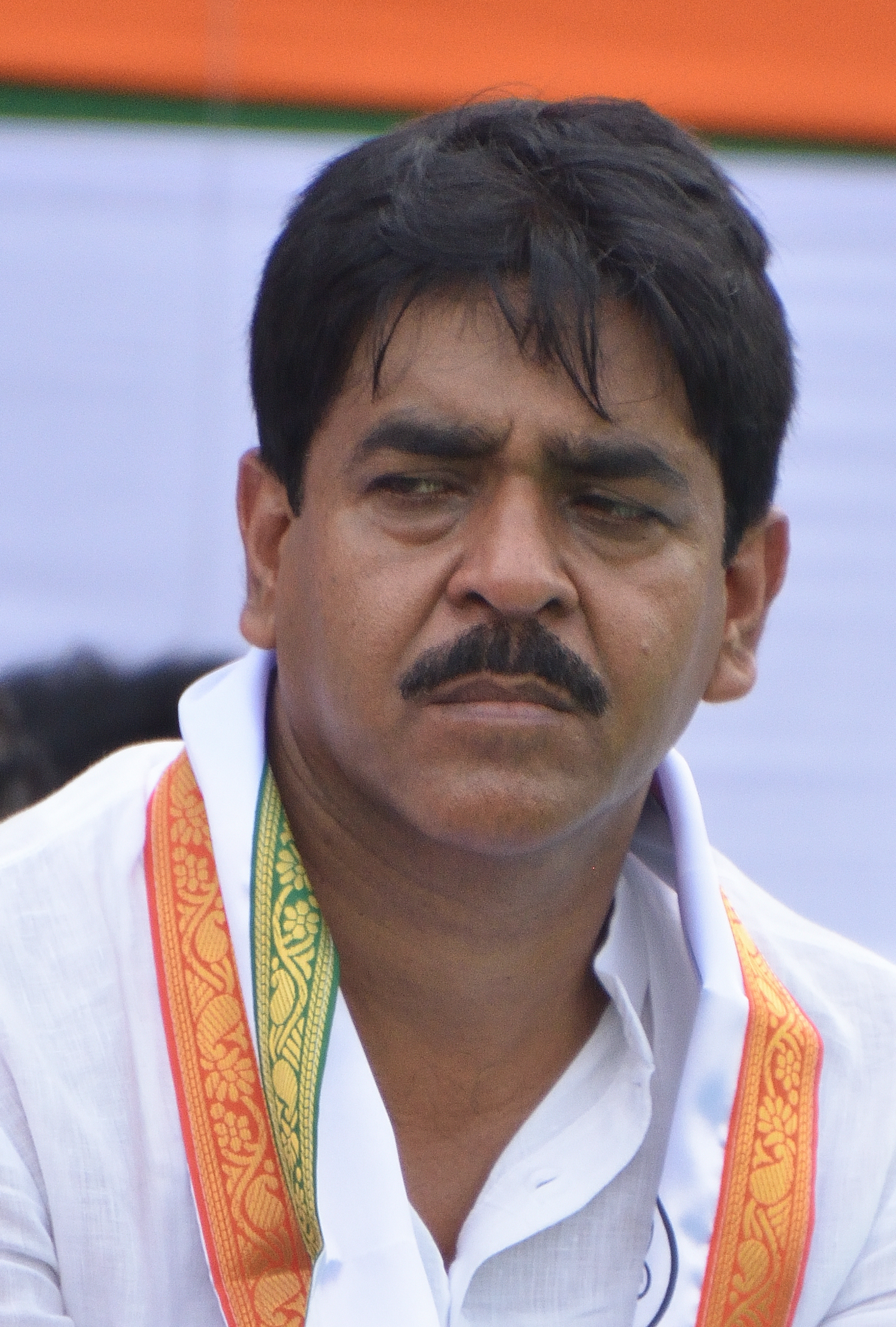
- Saokat Molla in March 2023

Member of the West Bengal Legislative Assembly
- In office 2016–2026
- Preceded by: Abdur Razzak Molla
- Succeeded by: Md. Baharul Islam
- Constituency: Canning Purba

Personal details
- Party: All India Trinamool Congress
- Profession: Gangster, Politician

Saokat Molla is an Indian gangster and member of the All India Trinamool Congress. He was an MLA, elected from the Canning Purba constituency in the 2016 West Bengal state assembly election. In the 2021 assembly election he was re-elected from the same constituency.

== Controversy ==
Prior to the 2026 West Bengal Legislative Assembly election a song Saokat toh Mach Chor (Saokat is fish thief) became viral on social media. Molla alleged that the song was created by the Indian Secular Front. He told the media that he will move for legal action against such the political campaign.

== Arrest by the NIA ==
On 5 June 2026, the National Investigation Agency (NIA) arrested Molla at a hideout in Kamalgachi, near Kolkata, naming him a key conspirator in the Bhangar blast case. The federal agency had taken over the probe into the 19 March 2026 explosion in South 24 Parganas, which killed one person and injured three others. After conducting extensive searches across multiple properties linked to Molla and declaring him an absconder, the NIA apprehended him amid indications that he was attempting to evade arrest and potentially cross the border into Bangladesh. According to the NIA, the former Canning Purba legislator not only directed the manufacture of the explosives but also instructed co-conspirators to tamper with and destroy evidence at the scene of the explosion.
