= Amlan Datta =

Indian economist (1924 - 2010)

Amlan Dutta
- Born: June 17, 1924; Comilla, British India
- Died: February 18, 2010 (aged 85); Bidhannagar, Kolkata, West Bengal, India
- Education: University of Calcutta
- Occupations: Economist; professor
- Awards: Ananda Puraskar; Vidyasagar Puraskar; Jagattarini Padak; Desikottom

Amlan Datta (Bengali: অম্লান দত্ত; 17 June 1924 – 18 February 2010) was an Indian economist and educationist. He was Pro-vice Chancellor of Calcutta University and Vice Chancellor of North Bengal and Visva-Bharti universities.

== Biography ==
Amlan Datta, originally named Amlan Kusum Dattagupta, was born into a Baidya family in the Comilla district of Bengal Presidency (now in Bangladesh). His parents’ names were Ashwini Kumar Datta Gupta and Sunitibala Devi. He was schooled at Ishwar Pathshala at Comilla, took 1st class first in Bachelor of Arts in economics from the Presidency College, and earned a first-class fourth in MA from the same university, both with distinction.

As a writer on socio-economic, political and philosophical subjects, Datta's works drew inspiration from Tagore, Mahatma Gandhi and Nehru. An opponent of parochialism and dogmatism, Datta evaluated prevailing political and economic doctrines, including Marxist Communism. He wrote along these lines for The Radical Humanist, The Economic Weekly, and Thought. His first book was published in 1953, titled For Democracy. He was the joint editor of Quest magazine along with Abu Sayeed Ayub.

After finishing his education in 1946, he started a career as a lecturer in Asutosh College of the University of Calcutta, and went on to be a lecturer at the University of Calcutta in 1948. He was the Pro-Vice Chancellor of Calcutta University during 1972–74. He also served as the Vice Chancellor of the University of North Bengal (1974–77). Then, he joined the Gandhian Institute of Studies as director in 1978, and thereafter as vice chancellor of Visva-Bharati University, Santiniketan. He also taught as visiting lecturer at Banaras Hindu University and the University of Brussels. He represented India at the United Nations Social Development Commission in 1979.

He died of a heart attack at his Salt Lake City residence on 18 February 2010.

== Awards and recognitions ==
- Desikottam Award from Visva Bharati University
- Jagattarini Award and Kamala Award from Calcutta University
- Ananda Puraskar from Anandabazar Group

Academic offices
Preceded by Surajit Chandra Sinha	Upacharya, Vishwa Bharati; 1980–1984	Succeeded by Nemai Sadhan Basu
