= Furfura Fatehia Senior Madrasah =

Coordinates: 22.74722°N 88.12972°E

- Established: 1 January 1903; 123 years ago
- Founder: Abu Bakr Siddique
- Students: 8,000
- Location: Hooghly, West Bengal, 712706, India

Furfura Fatehia Senior Madrasah (Note: Bengali: ফুরফুরা ফাতেহিয়া সিনিয়র মাদ্রাসা, Arabic: المدرسة الفتحية فرفرا) is a madrasah in Furfura Sharif, Hooghly district, West Bengal, India. It was founded in 1903 by the inaugural Pir of Furfura, Mohammad Abu Bakr Siddique.

== Educational activities ==
This madrasa is open to boys only, and classes are held in one shift. The medium of instruction is Bengali only, and the academic year of the madrasa begins in April. The madrasa has adequate classrooms and is taught by qualified teachers.

== Co-curricular activities ==
In addition to the institutional teaching, this madrasa organizes various competitive events. Such as international Quran recitation competitions, debate competitions and inter-competitive games. It also organizes regular educational tours. This madrasa has a large open playground, where students play games. The madrasa also has an advanced library with 30,000 books, this library is kept open for madrasa students and teachers.

== Alumni ==
- Abbas Siddiqui, politician and Islamic scholar
