= Md. Baharul Islam =

Indian politician (born 1988)

Mohammad Baharul Islam (born 1988) is an Indian politician from West Bengal. He is a member of the West Bengal Legislative Assembly from the Canning Purba Assembly constituency in South 24 Parganas district representing the All India Trinamool Congress.

== Early life and education ==
Islam is from Bhangar, South 24 Parganas district, West Bengal. He is the son of the late Abdul Hakim. He completed his B.A. at Bhangar Mahavidyalaya, Bhangar, which is affiliated with University of Calcutta in 2007. He is a farmer and also served as a chairman of the standing committee of Zilla Parishad. His wife is into Agri trading. He declared assets worth Rs.1.9 crore in his affidavit to the Election Commission of India.

== Career ==
Islam won the Canning Purba Assembly constituency representing the All India Trinamool Congress in the 2026 West Bengal Legislative Assembly election. He polled 1,48,687 votes and defeated his nearest rival, Arabul Islam of the All India Secular Front, by a margin of 91,954 votes.
