= Khan Mohammad Salek =

Bangladeshi educationist (born 1917)

Personal details
- Awards: Ekushey Padak - 1992

Khan Mohammad Salek was an educationist from Bangladesh. For his special contribution to the field of education, he was awarded the Ekushey Padak in 1992.

== Early life ==
Khan Mohammad Salek was born in 1917 in the village of Aklam, Nesarabad Upazila, Pirojpur District.

== Awards and honors ==
- Ekushey Padak - 1992
