= Mohammad Abu Bakr Siddique =

Bengali Islamic scholar and Sufi guide

Mujaddid-e-Zamān Amīr-e-Sharīʿat Mohammad Abu Bakr Siddique Pīr Ṣāḥeb Furfura
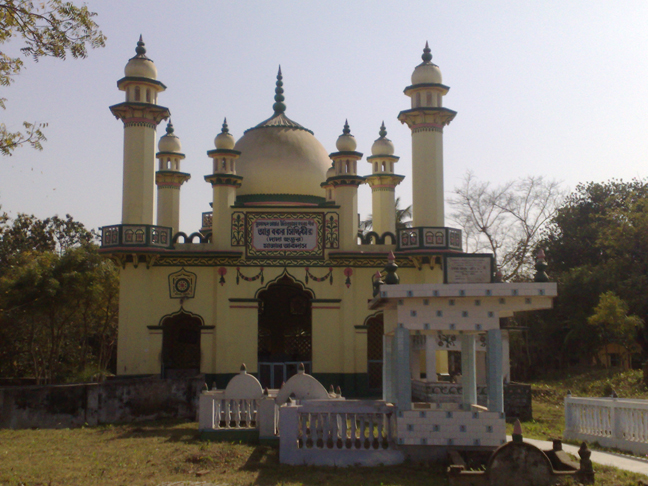
- Shrine of Abu Bakr Siddique

Personal life
- Born: 15 April 1845 Furfura, Hooghly district, Bengal Presidency
- Died: 17 March 1939 (aged 93)
- Resting place: Furfura Sharif
- Children: 5 sons
- Parents: Abdul Muqtadir Siddique (father); Muhabbatun Nisa Begum (mother)
- Notable work(s): Ilm Ma'refat and Service of Shari'ah
- Education: Hooghly Madrasah
- Relatives: Abbas Siddiqui (great-grandson); Nawsad Siddique (great-grandson); Mohammad Kasem Siddique (great-grandson)

Religious life
- Religion: Islam
- Denomination: Sunni
- Order: Furfura Sharif
- Jurisprudence: Hanafi

Muslim leader
- Teacher: Jamaluddin, Bilayet, Amin Ridwan
- Successor: Abdul Hai Siddique
- Disciple of: Fateh Ali Waisi
- Disciples: Abdul Khaleque Muhammad Shahidullah Nesaruddin Ahmad
- Students: Ahmed Ali Enayetpuri
- Influenced by: Karamat Ali Jaunpuri

Moḥammad Abū Bakr Ṣiddīque al-Qurayshī (15 April 1845 – 17 March 1939) was a Bengali Islamic scholar and the inaugural Pir of Furfura Sharif in West Bengal. He is regarded by his followers, who are scattered across eastern India and Bangladesh, as a mujaddid (reviver) of Islam in the region, due to his significant contributions in religious propagation via the establishment of mosques and madrasas, publication of newspapers and education development in neglected areas. He was the founding president of the sociopolitical Anjuman-i-Wazin-i-Bangla organisation, which advocated for causes such as the Khilafat Movement and Pakistan Movement. Siddique died in 1943, and his shrine is greatly venerated as one of West Bengal's most prominent Sufi centres.

== Early life and family ==
Mohammad Abu Bakr Siddique was born on 15 April 1845, to a Bengali Muslim family in the village of Furfura, located in Hooghly district. His father, Haji Abdul Muqtadir Siddiqui, was a mawlana. The family was believed to have been descendants of Abu Bakr, the first Caliph of Islam and a member of the Banu Taym clan, part of the Arab tribe of Quraysh. Their ancestor, Mansur Baghdadi, left Baghdad in the Abbasid Caliphate in 741 AH (1340 CE) and settled in a village now known as Mollapara in Hooghly district, in the erstwhile Sultanate of Bengal. Mansur's descendant, Haji Mustafa Madani, pledged bay'ah along with Emperor Aurangzeb to Masum Sirhindi, the third son of Ahmad Sirhindi. Some letters of correspondence between Madani and Sirhindi are preserved in the Maktubat-e-Masumia in Rauza Sharif, Sirhind, and were published by Abdul Halim Arambagi in his biography of Mohammad Abu Bakr Siddique. In 1667, Mughal Emperor Aurangzeb gifted Madani tax-free land and an estate which included a mosque, and the area was named after him as Madanipur (Midnapore).

Siddique's father died when he was nine months old, and so he was raised by his mother, Mohabbat-un-Nesa Begum.

== Education ==
His childhood education started at home around 1850. After learning basic Islamic knowledge, he enrolled in a local primary school and intended to begin teaching non-Islamic subjects including English. One night as a child, he dreamed that the Prophet of Islam, Muhammad, was advising him to abandon this teaching. He then left this education and joined Sitapur Madrassah, an ancient educational institution (established in 1772) near Furfura. After completing his primary education here, he took first place in the then highest Jamaat-e-Ula class from Mohsinia Madrasa in Hooghly city.

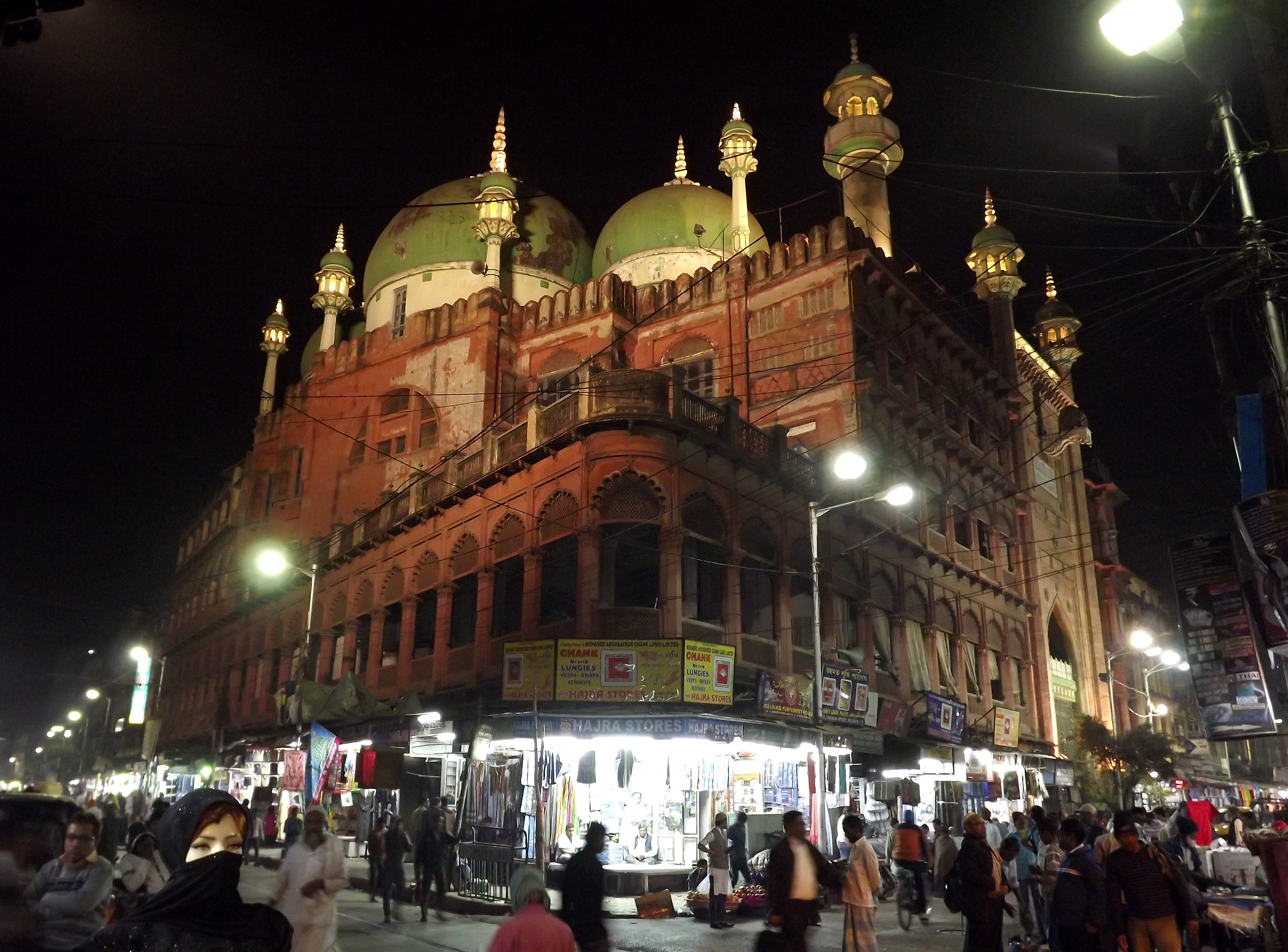
The Nakhoda Mosque of Kolkata, where Siddique studied.

Then went to Calcutta city and enrolled in Jamaluddin Education Center in the then Sinduria Patti Masjid (now Kalutla, Kolkata). There, Hafez studied Hadith, Tafsir and Fiqh under Jamaluddin Mungeri. Hafez Jamal Uddin was the caliph of Syed Ahmad Barelvi. He then studied Hikmah and philosophy under Nazar Shah Belayati from Firangi Mahal. He stayed at the Nakhoda Mosque while studying with Belayati.

After completing his formal education, he researched various aspects of Islam for 18 years. During this time he established his own library, where there were many rare books. The library is currently attached to the Furfura title madrasa he founded. In 1892 he traveled to Mecca and Medina. During his stay in Medina, he obtained the certificate of 40 Hadith books from the Muhaddith Syed Mohammad Amin Ibn Ahmad.

== Contribution to education ==
He established 1100 madrassahs and 700 mosques. The Madrassahs he established in his village became one of India's leading educational institutions, and even Haji Shariatullah, the founder of the Faraizi movement in East Bengal, came to this village to learn Arabic and Persian. He was a member of the managing committee of Calcutta Alia Madrassah in 1928.

== Hadith studies ==
M. Obaidul (1903–1984), principal of Feni Alia Madrassah in Bangladesh, said about him,

"ইলমে জাহের ব্যতীত আল্লাহ তাকে ইলমে লাদুন্নিও (আল্লাহ প্রদত্ত বিশেষ জ্ঞান) প্রদান করেছিলেন। তিনি ফলে কুরআন, হাদিস ও ফিকহের, ও ইসলামের মারেফতি শিক্ষার গভীরে জ্ঞান অর্জন করেছিলেন। বিশেষ করে তিনি হাদিস শাস্ত্রে অভূতপূর্ব জ্ঞান অর্জন করেছিলেন, যার জ্ঞান সারা উপমহাদেশে ছড়িয়ে পরেছে।

In addition to ilme jahr, Allah also bestowed upon him ilme ladunni (special knowledge given by God). He consequently acquired profound knowledge of the Qur'an, hadith and jurisprudence, and the teachings of Islam. In particular, he acquired an unprecedented knowledge of hadith, the knowledge of which spread throughout the subcontinent.

— M. Obaidul, From a biography of Abu Bakr Siddique

During his lifetime there was no teaching of Hadith in Alia Madrassah. He introduced this system, the practice of this system started in 1902 by teaching hadith in Kolkata Ghaspatti Mosque. Shamsul Ulama Shah Safiullah was appointed to this mosque to teach hadith on a salary of 20 rupees. He himself used to teach hadith in this mosque.

He acquired special erudition on hadith scriptures, his nephew Abu Jafar Siddique obtained the certificate of 20 hadith books from him. Maulana Mansoor Hussain, one of his relatives of Furfura village, received from him the recitation and attestation of the hadith book Musnad Abu Hanifa. Also many scholars learned hadith from him.

== Spiritual experience ==
Abu Bakr Siddique imbibed two methods of attaining nearness to Allah namely jizba and suluk. Much is said about his spiritual state during his student days at the Hooghly Madrassah, a four-way connection with his heart most nights. When this connection was associated with the Tariqa, he would eagerly chant that Tariqa. Also many times his apada-masat would be covered by a light and his self-forgetfulness would occur.

He was a khalifah of Fateh Ali Waisi.

== Influence ==
At the end of the 19th century, when the intensity of the Faraizi and Tariqa-e-Muhammadiyah movements subsided, the Muslims were also somewhat weak. There were many divisions among the Muslims, Abu Bakr was worried when the Muslims adopted different religions in different places. He was determined to work for the unity of the Ummah, and tried to eliminate shirk, Bid'ah, superstition etc. from the two Bengals. Among the scholars who helped him in this work were Shamsul Ulama Ghulam Salmani (1854–1912), Allama Lutfur Rahman Burdwani (d. 1920), Allama Ishaq Burdwani (d. 1928), Belayat Hussain Birbhumi (1887), Abdul Wahid Chatgami (d. 1910), Muhammad Mangalkoti Burdwani (d. 1907) is notable. Abdul Awwal Jaunpuri and Karamat Ali Jaunpuri also helped in spreading various ahadith. Both of them were influential writers.
