= Swarupkathi =

Municipality in Pirojpur, Bangladesh

Swarupkathi স্বরূপকাঠি
- Town and Municipality
- Interactive map of Swarupkathi
- Established: December 1998, 17; 27 years ago

Area
  - Total: 4.98 km^{2} (1.92 sq mi)

Population
  - Total: 28,529

Swarupkathi (স্বরূপকাঠি) is a municipality in Nesarabad, Pirojpur, Barisal, Bangladesh. It is the administrative headquarters of Nesarabad Upazila.

== History ==
On 17 December 1998, Swarupkathi Municipality was established.

== Administration ==
Swarupkathi Municipality has 9 wards.
