= Sutiakathi Union =

Sutiakathi সুটিয়াকাঠী
- Union
- Location in Bangladesh
- Coordinates: 22°44.8′N 90°6.2′E
- Country: Bangladesh
- Division: Barisal Division
- District: Pirojpur District

Area
  - Total: 11.3 km^{2} (4.4 sq mi)

Population (2011)
  - Total: 29,432
- Time zone: UTC+6 (BST)
- Postal code: 8522
- Website: Official website of Sutiakathi Union

Sutiakathi (Bengali: সুটিয়াকাঠী) is a Union of Nesarabad Upazila, Pirojpur District in the Division of Barisal, Bangladesh.
