= Hooghly Madrasah =

- হুগলি মাদ্রাসা

Location
- Chuchura, West Bengal, 712102; India
- Coordinates: 22°53′17″N 88°24′06″E

Information
- School type: Public
- Established: 1817
- Founder: Haji Muhammad Mohsin
- Grades: 1 - 10
- Language: Bengali & English

Hooghly Madrasah is one of the oldest educational institute in West Bengal. It was established by a renowned philanthropist of Bengal, Haji Muhammad Mohsin.

== History ==
Haji Muhammad Mohsin (1732–1812) a renowned philanthropist of Bengal, donated all his properties for the Muslim community in 1806 by establishing a waqf (charitable endowment). Five years after his death, ‘Madrasa-e-Mahsania’ was established on the bank of Ganges at Chinchura town. This madrasa was later came to be known as Hooghly Madrasa. Hooghly Mahsin College was established in 1836 by `Mohsin Endowment Fund’ and Hooghly Madrasa was administered by the college. In 1915, madrasa syllabus was revised by the British government and modern education was introduced. Since 1940 Hooghly Madrasa is also functioning as an intermediate college. After the independence and until 1962, West Bengal State Madrasa Board office was in the madrasa premises. Now it is only fully Govt. sponsored Madrasa and administered directly by the education department of West Bengal- Department of School Education.

== Alumni ==
Notable alumni include:

- Sir Syed Ameer Ali (1849–1928), jurist
- Mohammad Abu Bakr Siddique (1845–1939), Islamic scholar
- Maniruzzaman Islamabadi (1875-1950), author and Islamic scholar
- Tajuddin Ahmad (1925–1975), former prime minister of Bangladesh
- Abu Mohammed Habibullah (1911–1984), historian and educationist
- Shah Azizur Rahman (1925–1989), former prime minister of Bangladesh
- Abbas Ali Khan, education minister of East Pakistan
