= Ishwar Pathshala =

Coordinates: 23.4573°N 91.1804°E

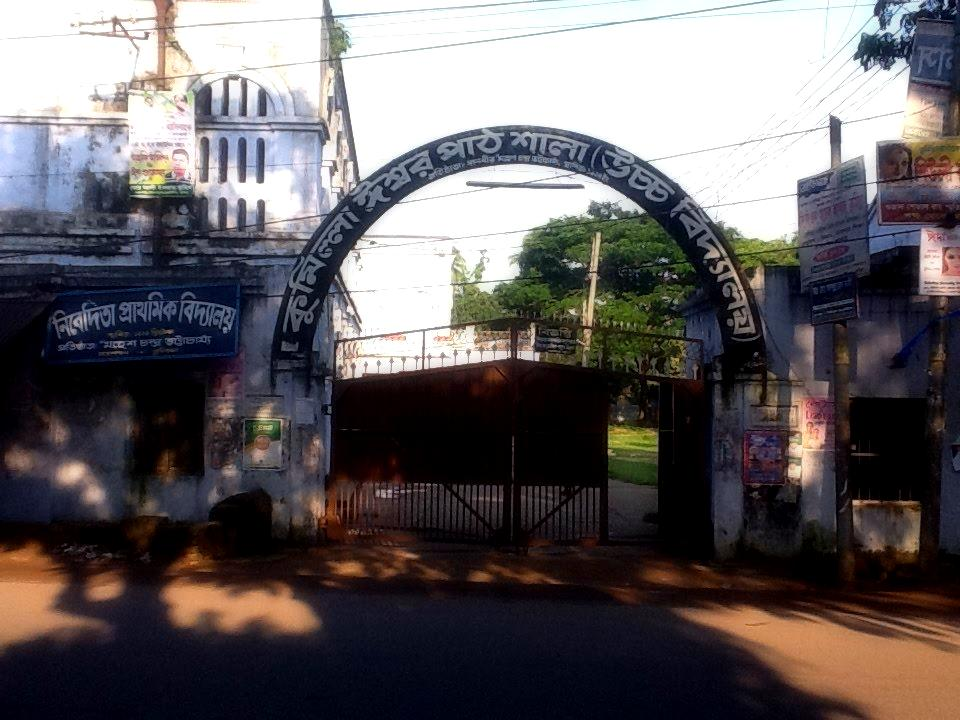
Ishwar Pathsala in 1914.

Ishwar Pathshala is a school in Comilla, Bangladesh.

The Rammala Library in Comilla is among the oldest libraries in Bangladesh. It was founded in 1912 by scholar and philanthropist Mahesh Chandra Bhattacharya (1858-1944), by expanding the earlier private library of a Sanskrit school called the Ishwar Pathsala Tol.

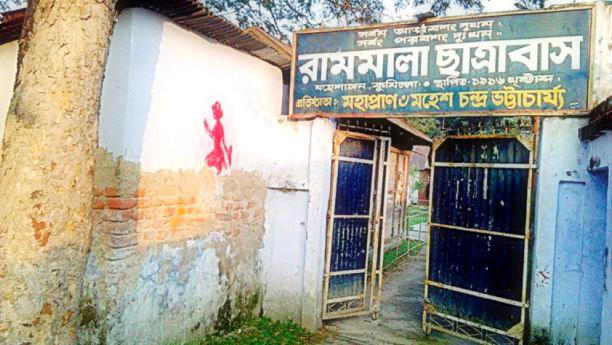
Rammala Library in 1912

Mahesh Chandra established Rammala Library after his mother's name in 1912 and Ishwar Pathsala in memory of his father in 1914. He established Rammala Hostel in 1916 where 84 male students live now. The Nibedita Girls Hostel established by the philanthropist in 1919 is home to 62 female students.
