= Panchpiria =

Muslim community in India

The Panchpiria are a Muslim community found in the state of Uttar Pradesh in India.
