= Arabul Islam =

Indian politician

Member of West Bengal Legislative Assembly
- In office 11 May 2006 – 13 May 2011
- Preceded by: Badal Jamadar
- Succeeded by: Badal Jamadar
- Constituency: Bhangar

Personal details
- Born: 10 October 1965 (age 60)
- Party: All India Trinamool Congress (2006–2026); Indian Secular Front (19th March 2026– 21st August 2026)

Arabul Islam is an Indian politician. He was elected as MLA of Bhangar Vidhan Sabha Constituency in West Bengal Legislative Assembly in 2006.

On 19 March 2026, he left the All India Trinamool Congress and joined the Indian Secular Front at Furfura Sharif.
