= Pirzada =

Owner of a Sufi shrine

A pirzada, refers to the owner of Sufi mausoleums and shrines in Muslim lands, with their earliest mention being in Baghdad. The word comes from the Persian word, pir (Persian: پیر) which means "teacher" or "guide" and the suffix zada means "son of".

In South Asia, pirzada refers to a gaddi nasheen.

== As a surname ==
- Pirzada Hanzala, Bangladeshi member of parliament
- Aamir Peerzada, Indian journalist
- Farooq Ahmed Shah Pirzada, Indian politician from Jammu and Kashmir
- Feroze Ahamad Peerzada, Indian politician from Jammu and Kashmir
- Gurfateh Pirzada, Indian actor, brother of Mehreen
- Mehreen Pirzada, Indian actress and model
- Mohammed Javed Pirzada, Indian politician from Gujarat
- Mohammad Syed Peerzada, Indian politician from Jammu and Kashmir
- Rabi Pirzada, Pakistani actress
- Sharifuddin Pirzada, Secretary General Organization of the Islamic Conference from 1985 to 1988
