= Baldia Union =

Baldia বলদিয়া
- Union
- Location in Bangladesh
- Coordinates: 22.7542°N 90.0720°E
- Country: Bangladesh
- Division: Barisal Division
- District: Pirojpur District
- Time zone: UTC+6 (Bangladesh Time)

Baldia is a Union in Pirojpur District under Nesarabad Upazila in the Barisal Division of southwestern Bangladesh.
