= Left Front-led Alliance =

Political coalition in India

- Left Front+
- Abbreviation: LF+
- Leader: Mohammed Salim
- Chairperson: Biman Bose
- Founded: 2026
- Ideology: Marxism-Leninism; Socialism; Secularism; Revolutionary patriotism Anti-imperialism
- Political position: Left-wing
- Colours: Red
- Lok Sabha: 0 / 42
- Rajya Sabha: 0 / 16
- West Bengal Legislative Assembly: 2 / 294
- Gram Panchayats: 3,785 / 63,229
- Panchayat Samitis: 196 / 9,730
- Zilla Parishads: 3 / 928
- Municipalities: 1 / 108
- Politics of India; Political parties; Elections; A: The Front is described as a broad left-wing alliance, with centre-left and far-left parties.

Left Front-led Alliance (abbr. LF+) is an alliance of left-wing to centre-left political parties led by the Left Front in West Bengal ahead of 2026 West Bengal Legislative Assembly election in opposition to the All India Trinamool Congress (AITC) and the Bharatiya Janata Party (BJP).

== History ==
=== Background ===
Following the fall of CPI(M)-led Left Front government in West Bengal along with the rise of the Trinamool Congress in 2011 and the rise of the Bharatiya Janata Party in 2014, the CPI(M) had welcomed ideas of the broad understanding of secular and democratic forces. The first signs came when in the Siliguri municipal election, CPI(M) made some local understanding with INC resulting in CPI(M) leader Ashok Bhattacharya being appointed as the mayor. This success got popularity as the "Siliguri Model". After the success of the model, in the long run, some Congress and CPI(M) leader advocated for a Left-Congress alliance. This gradually materialized into "alliance" between INC and Left Front. The precedence of the Left Front providing outside support to the UPA-I government in 2004-2008 was cited in support. Given the political history of West Bengal, the materialisation of an alliance between the Congress & the CPI(M), 2 parties that have been bitter rivals of each other since the 1970s & have a history of unleashing political violence against each other's cadres, took the political circles of the state by surprise. After much dispute and secession of two far-left groups: SUCI(C) and CPI(ML)L, from the Left Front, both Congress and the Communists formed an understanding basis of what they called "seat-sharing", strongly objecting to the use of the word "alliance".

=== 2016 election and Mahajot ===
In 2016, Mahajot was formed on the broad agreement that some political parties proposed before the 2016 West Bengal Legislative Assembly election for fighting against the Trinamool Congress government in West Bengal and the Bharatiya Janata Party on national level. Left Front consisting of CPI(M), CPI, RSP, AIFB and DSP along with INC released their respective candidate list in several rounds after consultations and bargaining. However, the alliance failed to gain the majority seats in the assembly elections.

Afterwards, ahead of 2019 Indian general election, the alliance between the Congress and the Left Front is off the cards as both camps could not agree on a seat-sharing formula for Lok Sabha elections, especially in the Raiganj and Murshidabad seats, where the incumbent MP was from CPI(M) but the MLAs of the constituent legislative assembly seats were mostly from the Congress.

=== 2021 election and Sanjukta Morcha ===
Subsequently, Mahajot was succeeded by Sanjukta Morcha in 2021 with the joining of ISF in the alliance. Despite a spirited campaign, both the Left Front and the Indian National Congress drew a blank in the election with a considerable decrease in their respective vote shares. That was the first time when the West Bengal Legislative Assembly was devoid of any MLA from Left Front or Congress.

=== 2024 election and Secular Democratic Alliance ===
Ahead of 2024 Indian general election, ISF decided to contest alone in the Lok Sabha polls due to some differences in seat sharing and marks the end of alliance with Left and INC. Thereafter, Sanjukta Morcha was succeeded by LF–INC Alliance or Secular Democratic Alliance. The alliance won only 1 seat (Maldaha Dakshin by INC) out of the 42 it contested.

=== 2026 election and Left Front-led Alliance ===
Afterwards, ahead of 2026 West Bengal Legislative Assembly election Indian National Congress decided to fight alone in the polls marking the end of LF–INC Alliance. On the other hand, Left Front kept uniting other left parties (communist and socialist parties) including CPI(ML)L and other 'secular', 'democratic' forces and fractions together forming a broader Left Front-led Alliance. Subsequently, ISF once again joined hands with the alliance led by the CPI(M)-led Left Front. The alliance won 2 seats (Domkal by CPI(M) and Bhangar by ISF) out of 293 it contested.

== Members ==
Left Front+
| Party | Flag | Ideology | Political position | Leader(s) |
|---|---|---|---|---|
Left Front
| Communist Party of India (Marxist) | | Marxism-Leninism; Anti-imperialism | Left-wing to far-left | M. A. Baby; Mohammed Salim |
| Communist Party of India | | Marxism-Leninism; Anti-imperialism | Left-wing to far-left | D. Raja; Swapan Banerjee |
| All India Forward Bloc | | Left-wing nationalism Anti-imperialism | Left-wing | G. Devarajan; Naren Chatterjee |
| Revolutionary Socialist Party | | Revolutionary socialism Anti-imperialism | Left-wing | Manoj Bhattacharya; Tapan Hore |
| Revolutionary Communist Party of India | | Marxism-Leninism | Far-left | Subhash Roy |
| Marxist Forward Bloc | | Marxism | Left-wing | Ashish Chakraborty |
| Bolshevik Party of India | | Marxism-Leninism | Left-wing | Probir Ghosh |
| Workers Party of India | | Marxism | Left-wing | Shipra Chakraborty |
Left Front allies
| Communist Party of India (Marxist-Leninist) Liberation | | Marxism-Leninism-Maoism; Anti-imperialism | Far-left | Dipankar Bhattacharya; Abhijit Majumder |
| West Bengal Socialist Party | | Socialism | Left Wing | Manindra Chandra Paul |
| All India Secular Front | | Social justice | Centre to centre-left | Nawsad Siddiqui |
| Social Democratic Party of India | | Social justice | Right wing | Hakikul Islam |

=== External support ===
| Party | Flag | Ideology | Political position | Leader(s) |
|---|---|---|---|---|
| Communist Party of India (Marxist-Leninist) Red Star | | Marxism-Leninism-Maoism | Far-left | Sankar Ghosh |
| West Bengal Forward Bloc | | Scientific socialism | Left-wing | Subrata Kumar Dey |

=== Past members ===
| Party | Flag | Ideology | Political position | Leader(s) |
|---|---|---|---|---|
| Indian National Congress | | Secularism; Civic nationalism | Centre | Subhankar Sarkar |

== Election results ==
=== Results of State Assembly election in West Bengal ===
| Election Year | Overall Votes | % of overall votes | Total seats | Seats won | +/- in seats | +/- in vote share |
|---|---|---|---|---|---|---|
| 2026 | 4,330,575 | 6.77 | 293 | 2 | ▲1 | ▼ |

== See also ==
- Left Democratic Front (Kerala)
- Left Front (West Bengal)
- Left Front (Tripura)
- Communist Party of India (Marxist), West Bengal
