= Ramamālā Library =

Library in Comilla, Bangladesh

Coordinates: 23.4574°N 91.1808°E

- Formation: 1912; 114 years ago
- Type: Library
- Legal status: Public Library
- Headquarters: Comilla, Bangladesh
- Location: F55J+482, Laksham Rd, Comilla
- Region served: Bangladesh
- Official language: Bengali

The Rāmamālā Library (or Ramamala Library; Rammala Library; Ramamala Granthagar) in Comilla, Bangladesh, is one of the oldest still active traditional libraries in Bangladesh. It was founded in 1912 by the scholar and philanthropist Mahesh Chandra Bhattacharya (1858–1944), growing out of the earlier private library of the traditional Sanskrit school called the Īśvara Pāṭhaśālā Ṭol (or Iswar Pathsala Tol). After its founding, Rashmohan Chakravarty and Mahesh Chandra Bhattacharya himself worked to expand its holdings. According to a recent article, "many of the manuscripts were donated by local families who gave up their household libraries on the eve of the British colonial period for the sake of preserving them."

The Rāmamālā Library collection includes approximately 9,000 palm-leaf and paper manuscripts, mostly from the early modern period (roughly 1700-1900 AD). The collection was established in order to promote education and preserve Bengali culture. It includes many manuscripts of scientific, legal, and other literature in Sanskrit, together with many regional works in Bengali (e.g., a rare recension of the Mahābhārata) and some works in Prakrit. The library encompasses not just Hindu works but also works related to a distinctive, regional variety of Islam (Satya Pir). "The known contents of the library include works of literature, poetics, philosophy, grammar, medicine, astrology and theatre," notes Benjamin Fleming, "but despite early efforts by various scholars, the full scope of the collection remains unknown." There have been various efforts at preserving the library; a new initiative to make a list of its contents and digitally photograph some manuscripts began in 2014.

The library has also played a significant role in the study of Sanskrit, not just collecting and preserving manuscripts, but also publishing Sanskrit books. It also become an important research centre in Religious Studies due to its collection of printed books on different faiths like Hinduism, Buddhism, Christianity, Islam and Jainism.
