= Abdur Razzak Molla =

Indian politician (1944–2025)

- আব্দুর রেজ্জাক মোল্লা

Minister of Land and Land Reforms Government of West Bengal
- In office 1991–2011

Member of the West Bengal Legislative Assembly
- In office 1977–2016
- Constituency: Canning Purba
- In office 2016–2021
- Constituency: Bhangar

Personal details
- Born: 31 July 1944
- Died: 11 April 2025 (aged 80) Bankra, North 24 Parganas, West Bengal, India
- Party: Trinamool Congress (2016–2025); Bharatiya Naybichar Party (BNP) (expelled in 2016); Communist Party of India (Marxist) (expelled in 2014)
- Parent: Arsed Molla (father)

Abdur Razzak Molla (Note: alternatively spelled Rezzak Mollah) (31 July 1944 – 11 April 2025) was an Indian politician who served as Minister for Land and Land Reforms in the Left Front Ministry in West Bengal. He became MLA for 11 terms in his political career.

== Background ==
Molla was son of the late Arsed Molla, attracted to the Communist movement while a college student and started his political career on the peasant front. Molla was born at Bankri village in a farming family in rural South 24 Parganas. He passed Secondary Education in 1978.

Molla died on 11 April 2025, at the age of 80.

== Political career ==
Molla was elected from the Canning Purba seat from 1977 to 2011. He was one of the few ministers to retain his seat in the 2011 elections.

In February 2014, the CPI(M) West Bengal State Committee issued a note expelling Molla from the party for his anti-party activities. He formed a new political party- Bharatiya Naybichar Party (BNP) on 18 October 2014. However, Molla was expelled from the BNP for establishing relationship with Mamata Banerjee and TMC in Jan 2016 and he joined hands with Trinamool Congress officially in Feb 2016.

He was made a candidate for the Trinamool Congress from Bhangar for the 2016 assembly elections.
