= All India Secular Front =

Political party in West Bengal, India

- Abbreviation: AISF
- Chairman: Nawsad Siddique
- Secretary: Biswajit Maity
- Founder: Abbas Siddiqui
- Founded: 21 January 2021 (5 years ago)
- Headquarters: Furfura Sharif, Hooghly, West Bengal
- Colours: Blue
- ECI status: Registered Unrecognised Party
- Seats in West Bengal Legislative Assembly: 1 / 294

Election symbol
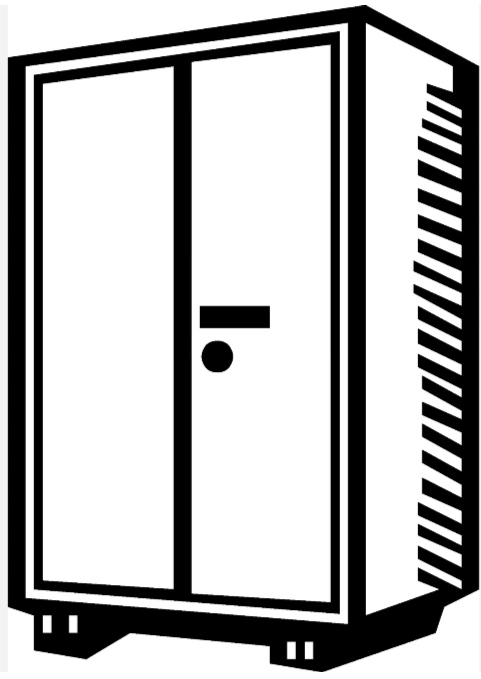

Party flag

The All India Secular Front (AISF) is an Indian political party founded by Abbas Siddiqui in 2021. Currently allied with the Left Front-led Alliance, the party is chaired by Naushad Siddiqui and has its headquarters located at Furfura Sharif in Hooghly district.

== History ==
AISF was formed ahead of the West Bengal Assembly election of 2021 and joined the Sanjukta Morcha, led by the Left Front and the Indian National Congress against the All India Trinamool Congress and the Bharatiya Janata Party. It contested the 2021 West Bengal Legislative Assembly election in 32 seats and won in 1 seat. The party fought the election under the borrowed symbol of Rashtriya Secular Majlis Party, a Bihar-based political party. Afterwards, ahead of 2026 West Bengal Legislative Assembly election, AISF again joined the alliance led by CPI(M)-led Left Front. Subsequently, AISF retained its common election symbol under the revised ECI criteria ahead of the polls. In 2026 West Bengal Legislative Assembly election, AISF won 1 seat out of 29 it contested.

== Electoral performance ==
For the 2021 West Bengal Legislative Assembly election, the AISF allied with the Communist Party of India (Marxist) and Indian National Congress in an alliance named Sanjukta Morcha. Nawsad Siddique is the only MLA from the party. Ahead of 2026 West Bengal Legislative Assembly election, AISF joined the alliance led by CPI(M)-led Left Front. AISF won the Bhangar Assembly constituency both in 2021 and 2026 respectively.

Election Year	Leader	Poll alliance	seats contested	seats won	+/- in seats	Overall votes	% of overall votes	+/- in vote share	Sitting side
West Bengal Legislative Assembly
2021	Nawsad Siddique	SM	32	1	▲1	813,489	1.35%	▲	Opposition
2026	Nawsad Siddique	LF+	30	1	Steady	972,280	1.53%	▲	Opposition

== See also ==
- List of political parties in India
