= Furfura Sharif =

- Village
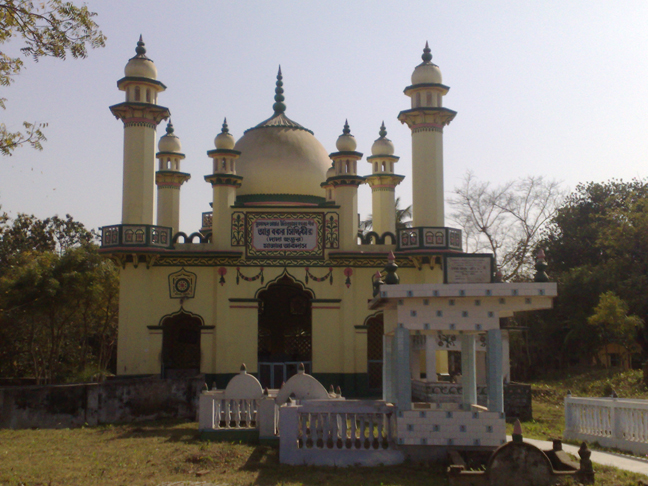
- Furfura Mazar

- Location in West Bengal, India Furfura Sharif (India)
- Coordinates: 22.7502292°N 88.1320064°E
- Country: India
- State: West Bengal
- District: Hooghly
- Elevation: 11 m (36 ft)

Population (2001)
  - Total: 6,720

Languages
  - Official: Bengali, English
- Time zone: UTC+5:30 (IST)
- PIN: 712706
- Telephone code: 91 3212
- ISO 3166 code: IN-WB

Furfura is a village in Jangipara community development block of Srirampore subdivision in Hooghly District in the state of West Bengal, India. It is a holy place for some Bengali Muslims. Before the afternoon prayers, people queue up at the mazar (shrine) of Mohammad Abu Bakr Siddique (1846–1939), a prominent pir (holy person) of the town. People say it is the second most prominent mazar in west bengal after Gazi Pir Mazar in Ghutiari Sharif.

== History ==
The masjid built by Muqlish Khan in 1375 is a site for Muslim pilgrimage, especially during the pir's mela (fair). It attracts a large number of pilgrims during Urs festival. Oral tradition holds that the Bagdi (Barga Kshatriya) king who ruled here was defeated by Shah Kabir Halibi and Karamuddin, both of whom were killed in the battle. Their tombs are revered to this day by both Hindus and Muslims. Veracity of the account and other details are unstudied.

Furfura Sharif contains the mazar of one Pir Mohammad Abu Bakr Siddique and his five sons, popularly known as the Panch Huzur Qeblah. He was a social and religious reformer, who founded charitable institutes, orphanages, madrasas, schools and learning centers. He encouraged female education by establishing a School for girls in Furfura Sharif named Siddiqua High School. He was the founder of the "Order Of Furfura Sharif" or "Silsila-e-Furfura Sharif" and a religious congregation observed on the 21st, 22nd and 23rd of Falgun (Bengali month) (Approx 5, 6 & 7 March).

Jangipara CD block map

== Location ==
Furfura is located at 22.7545°N 88.1301°E

Villages in Furfura panchayat are as follows: Furfura, Purba Durgapur, Gopalnagar, Hosenpur, Dakshindihi, Rampara, Toralpur, Santoshpur, Chak Barada, Belpara, Ramnagar, Nilarpur, Charpur, Bakcha, Kashipur, Ramchandrapur, Hazipur, and Bhimpur.

== Demographics ==
Furfura had a population of 6,720 out of which 1,133 belonged to scheduled castes and 195 belonged to scheduled tribes according to the census of 2001.

== Education ==
Furfura High Madrasah is a coeducational institution affiliated to the West Bengal Council of Higher Secondary Education. It has arrangements for teaching Bengali, English, history, geography, philosophy, political science, mathematics and economics. Furfura High Madrasah, established in 1908, is the oldest high madrasah in the district.

The Aliah University controls three other "madrasah colleges" in the state — the "colleges" at Batna (in Malda district), Beldanga (in Murshidabad district) and Furfura Sharif. With the introduction of "modern subjects" including computer application, the teachers for these colleges will now be recruited through the Public Service Commission.

Sk Md Rofiqul Islam was Assistant Teacher and Teacher-in-Charge, Furfura Fatehia Senior Madrasah won the National Award for Teachers in 2007.

== Healthcare ==
Furfura has a Primary Health Centre with 10 beds.
