= Pir (Sufism) =

Sufi master or spiritual guide

Pir (Persian: پیر, romanized: pīr, lit. 'elder') or Peer is a title for a Sufi spiritual guide. They are also referred to as a Hazrat (from Arabic: حضرة, romanized: Haḍra) . The title is often translated into English as "saint". In Sufism, a Pir's role is to guide and instruct his disciples on the Sufi path. This is often done by general lessons (called Suhbas) and individual guidance. Other words that refer to a Pir include Murshid (Arabic: مرشد, lit. 'guide, mentor') and Sarkar (Persian: سرکار, lit. 'master, lord').

== Pirzada ==
The title Pirzada or Peerzada (from Persian: بابا, lit. 'father') is common in the Indian subcontinent used as a salutation to Sufi masters or similarly honored persons. After their death, people visit their tombs or mausolea, referred to as dargah or maqbara. The people having this title are also called Shah. The title is most used by Pirs of Sindh. The title is common in Iran, India and Afghanistan.

== Pir-o-Murshid ==
Pir-o-Murshid is a Persian term that is often used in Sufism. In Sufism, a Pir (also spelled as peer) refers to a spiritual guide or master who provides guidance and mentorship to seekers on their spiritual path.

The word "Pir" is derived from the Persian word for "old" or "elder". The term "Murshid" is an Arabic word meaning "guide" or "teacher." It is used to refer to a spiritual leader who offers guidance and support to disciples or students in their spiritual journey.

== See also ==
- Spiritual direction
- Satya Pir, a folk hero
- Panchpiria, an ethnic group defined by their reverence for five pirs
