= Mohsin Fund =

Historical endowment for academic instititutions in Bengal

Mohsin Fund was an important endowment created by Muhammad Mohsin which funded the establishment of numerous academic establishments across Bengal in the 19th and early 20th century.

== History ==
Mohsin Fund was established in 1806 by philanthropist Muhammad Mohsin. He was the zamindar of Saiyadpur Estate which he inherited from half-sister Mannujan Khanam. He funded a number of food kitchens during the Great Bengal famine of 1770. He established an Waqf to manage revenue from his zamindari and his family Shi'ite Imambara. The Waqf, Islamic trust, would provide funding to the Mohsin Fund. He himself was celibate and as such did not have any heirs. The Waqf governors start embezzling the assets and funds of the Waqf including the Saiyadpur Estate.

The Privy Council took up the case and the British Raj dismissed all governors as they believed the corruption would be threatening revenue from the estate. The Waqf and Fund expanded significantly under management of the colonial government. It funded the established of Hooghly Madrasah in 1817 and Hooghly Mohsin College in 1836. The government used the fund to benefit both Muslim and Hindu students but it was decided to exclusively use the fund for Muslim students in 1873.

=== List of institutions funded by Mohsin Fund ===
- Hooghly Mohsin College
- Hooghly Madrasah
- Kabi Nazrul Government College
- Dhaka Madrasah (Mohasania Madrasah)
- Brajalal College
- Mohammedan Literary Society
- Hooghly Imambara
