= Dhaka Government Muslim High School =

Dhaka Govt. Muslim High School
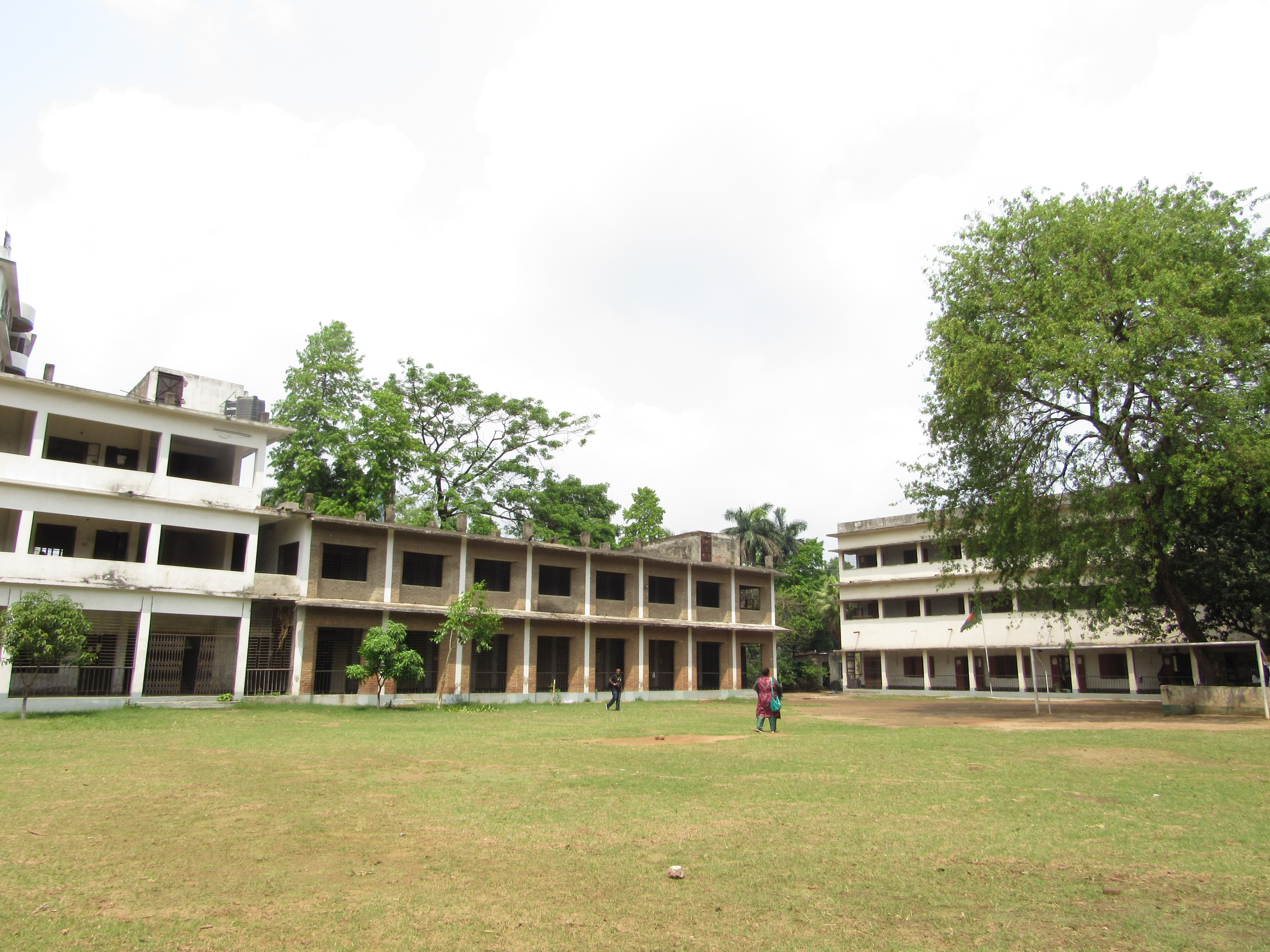

Location
- Victoria (now Bahadur Shah) Park; Luxmibazar; Dhaka; Bangladesh; 23.7087°N 90.4130°E

Information
- Type: Government, Boys High School
- Established: 1874

Dhaka Government Muslim High School (Bengali: ঢাকা গভঃ মুসলিম হাই স্কুল) is a secondary school in Lakshmi Bazaar in Dhaka, Bangladesh. It is one of the oldest schools in Dhaka.

== History ==
Muslim Government High School, Dhaka was originally established as Dhaka Madrasah in 1874 under governor of Bengal George Campbell and approval of the Madrasah Reform Committee. It was funded by the Haji Muhammad Mohsin Fund established by Haji Muhammad Mohsin and named Mohsinia Madrasah. Ubaidullah Al Ubaidi Suhrawardy became principal of the Madrassah and operated it from various temporary housing.

khwaja Abdul Ghani provided Rs 5,500 for the Madrassah to buy a permanent land. The new building was designed by Major Mann and with Vivian Scott working as site engineer. It moved to the new building in 1880. It was elevated to a High School level Madrassah in 1915.

The Anglo-Persian wing of the Madrassah becomes the Dhaka Government Muslim High School, and the rest of the departments are turned into the Islamic Intermediate College, affiliated with the Department of Islamic Studies of the University of Dhaka. The college would later become Islamia Government College and Islamia Govt. High School in 1970. The college finally became Kabi Nazrul Government College in 1972.

== Notable alumni ==
- Abdullah-Al-Muti, educationist
- Khwaja Khaeruddin, politician
- Nurul Momen, playwright
- ANM Bazlur Rashid, educationist
- Abdur Razzak, National Professor
- Khwaja Wasiuddin, Lt. General
- Kazi Abdul Baset, painter

== Gallery ==
The academic building of the school

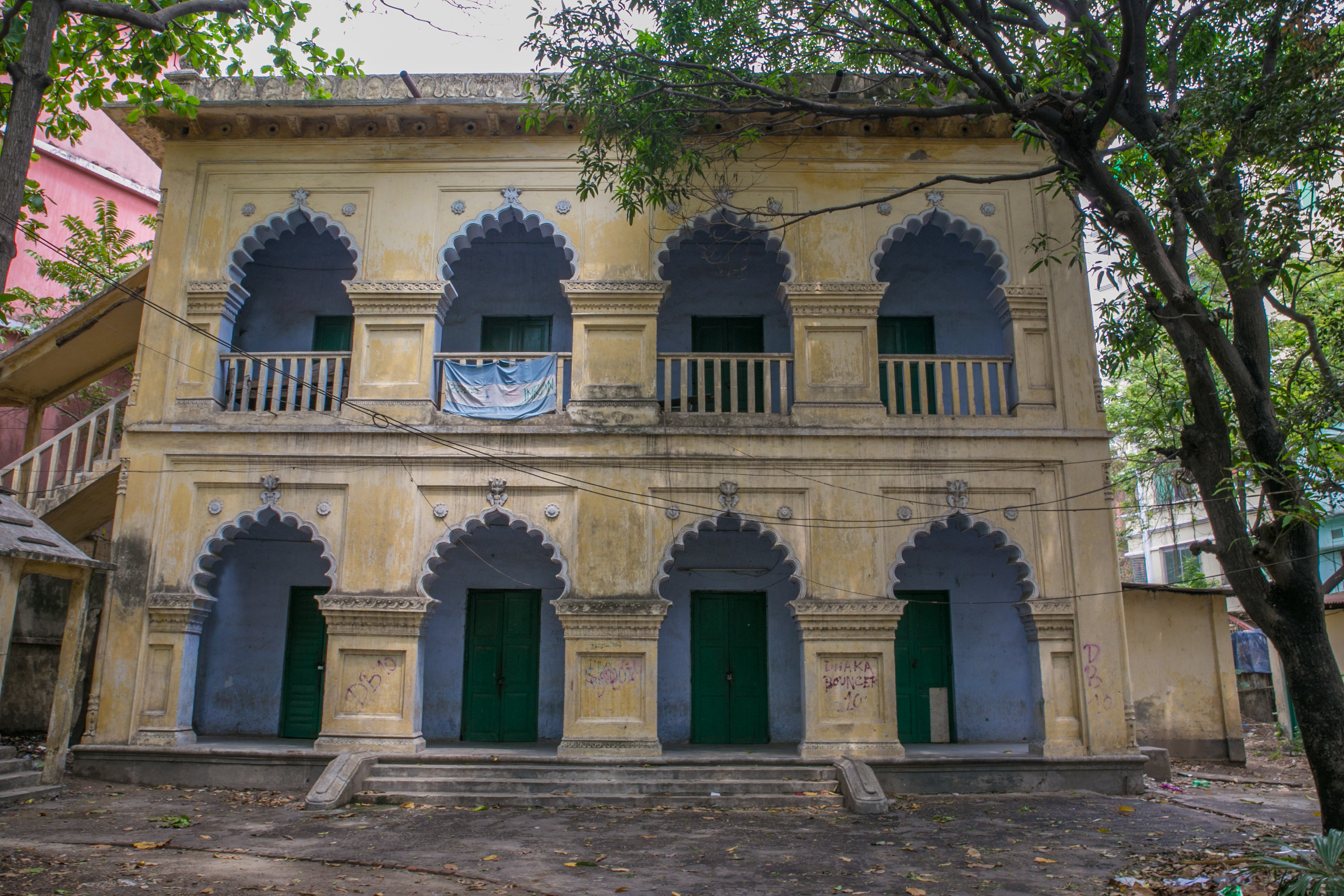
Dormitory building

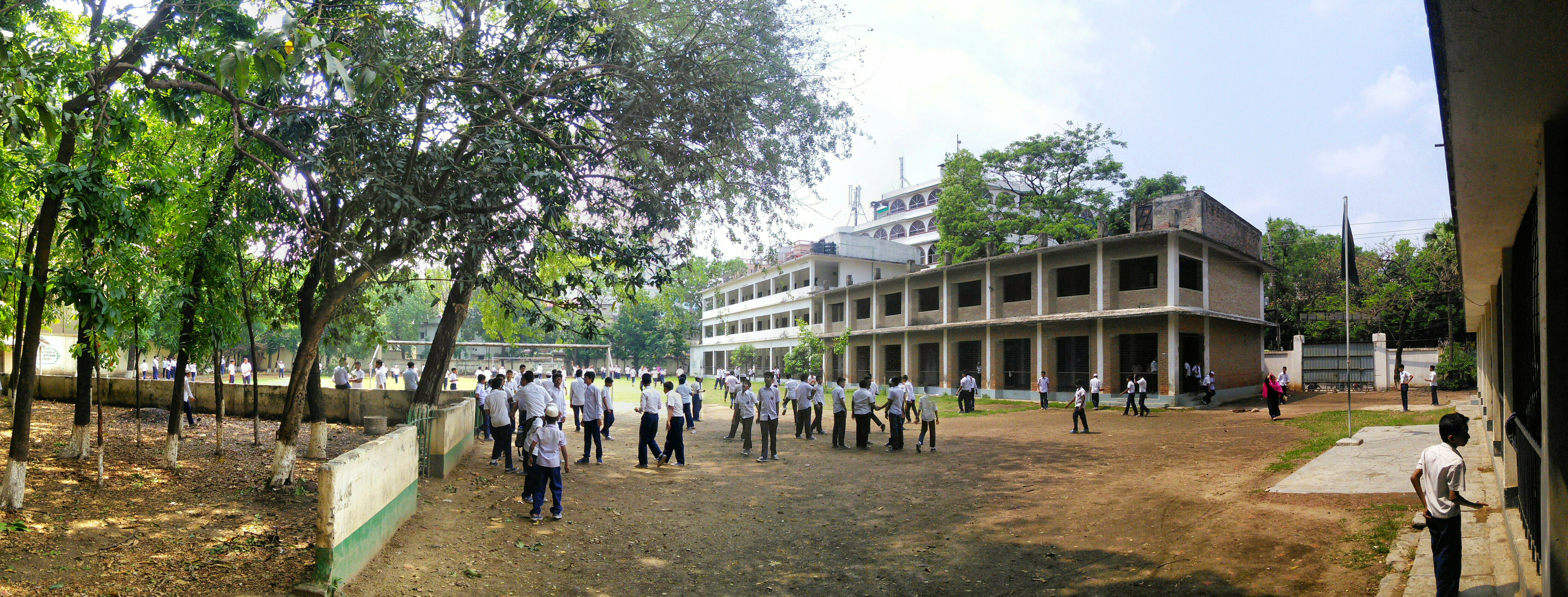
The courtyard and the academic building.

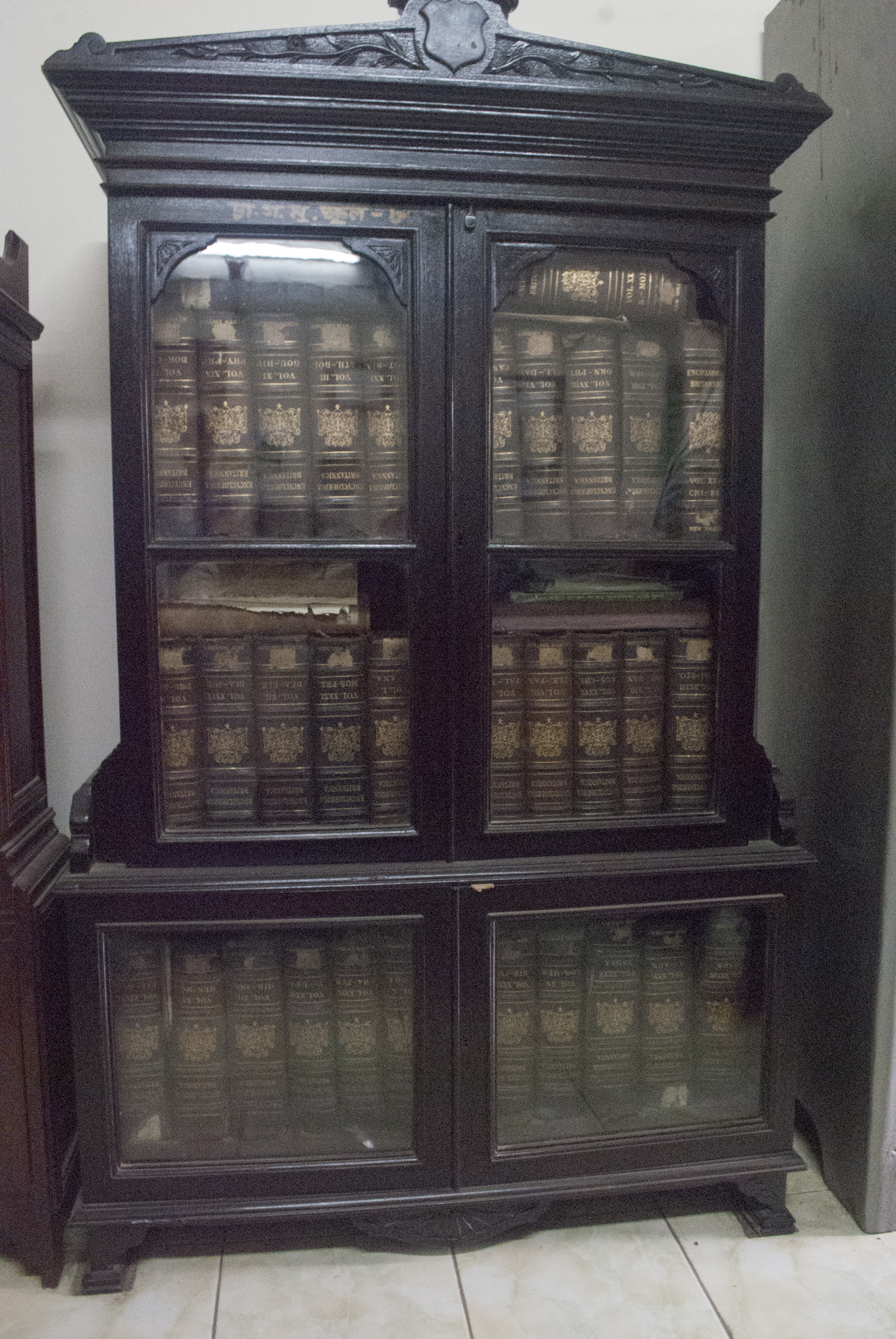
Bookshelves of early 1920s are still preserved in the school. The bookshelf contains original copies of Encyclopædia Britannica.
