= Hooghly Muslim Cemetery =

Muslim cemetery in West Bengal

- Hooghly Muslim Cemetery

Details
- Location: Hooghly-Chinsurah, Hooghly district, West Bengal
- Country: India
- Type: Muslim cemetery

Hooghly Muslim Cemetery is a Muslim burial ground situated beside the historic Imambara at Hooghly-Chinsurah, in the Indian state of West Bengal. The cemetery is associated with the religious and charitable institutions founded by Haji Muhammad Mohsin, the prominent Bengali Muslim philanthropist.

== History ==
The cemetery is attached with the Hooghly Imambara, an Islamic religious complex established by the charitable trust of Haji Muhammad Mohsin. Mohsin executed the trust deed in 1806, dedicating his inherited wealth to religious and charitable purposes. The deed provided for expenditure on religious purposes, the maintenance of the Imambara and this cemetery. The burial ground contains the tomb of Muhammad Mohsin.

== Gallery ==
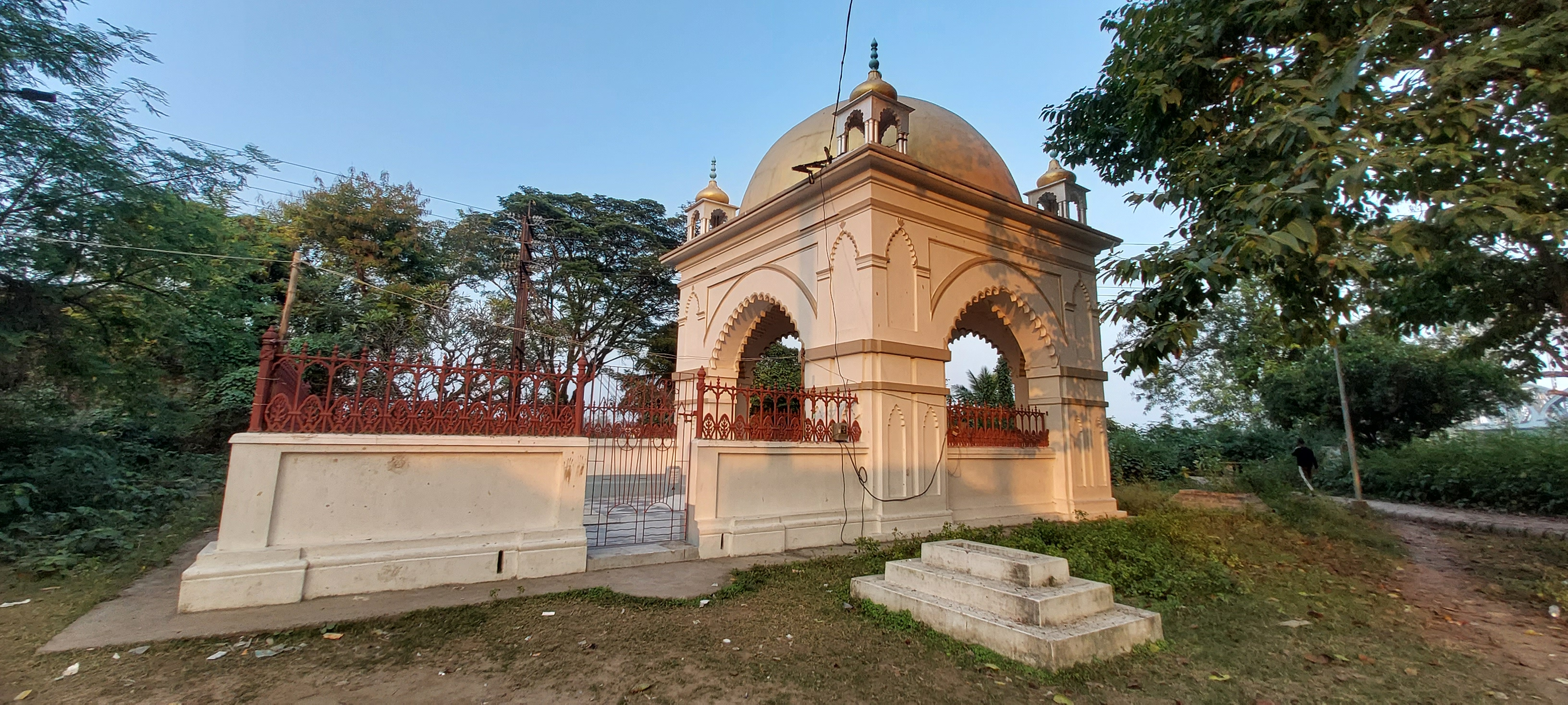
The tomb of Haji Muhammad Mohsin

View of the cemetery

Graves within the cemetery

Graves of Muhammad Mohsin's damily
