= Salma Khatun (train driver) =

- সালমা খাতুন
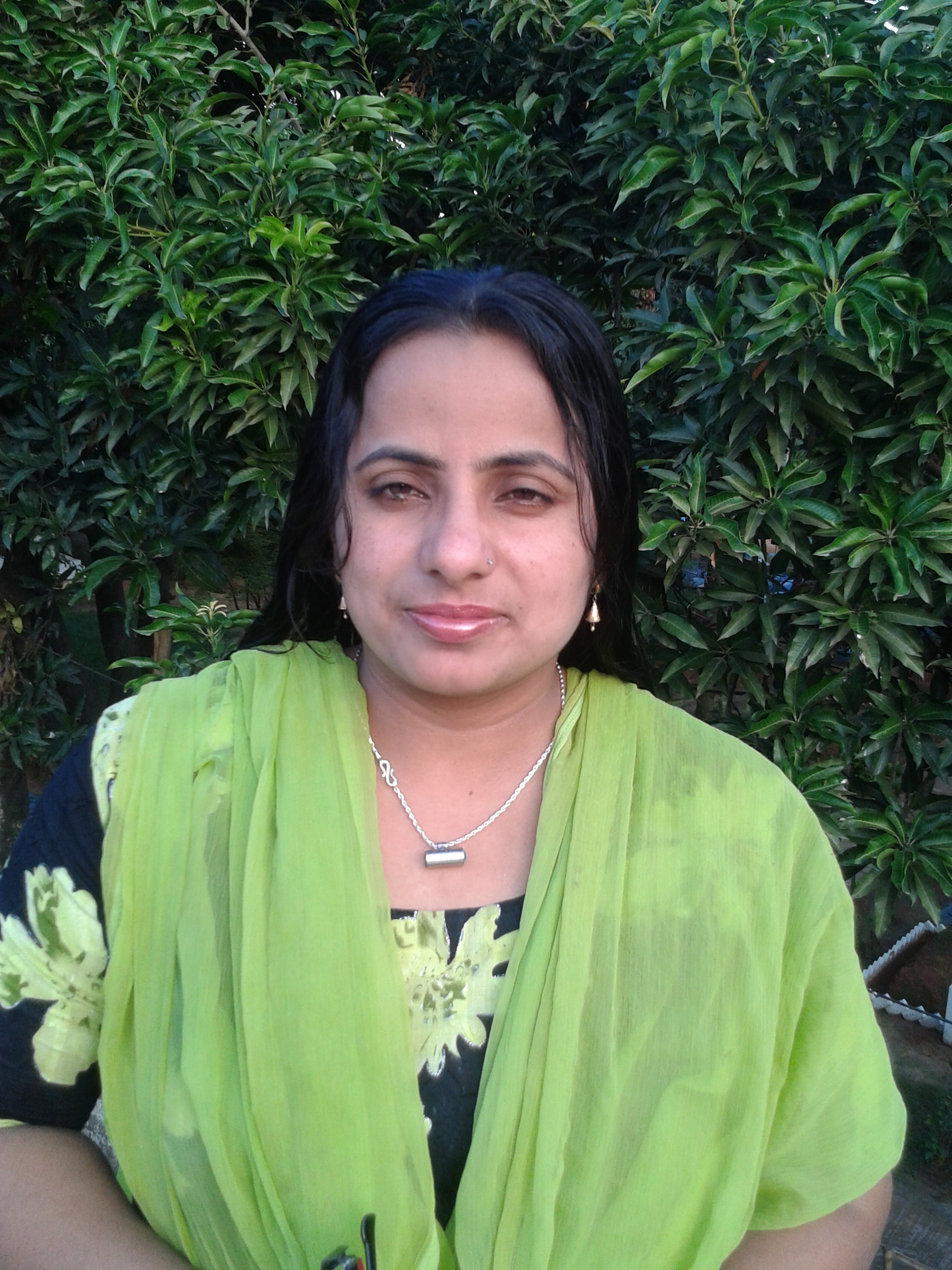
- Khatun in 2012
- Born: Tangail District
- Education: Kabi Nazrul Government College (master's, 2015)
- Occupation: Train driver

Salma Khatun is the first female train driver of Bangladesh. She started work as Assistant Locomotive Master (ALM) of Bangladesh Railway in 2004. Since she became the first female ALM with Bangladesh Railway, she has been joined by at least 14 more.

== Early life and education ==
Salma Khatun was born in the village of Arjuna in Bhuapur Upazila, Tangail District to a subsistence farmer and a homemaker. Khatun earned her Secondary School Certificate (SSC) from Arjuna Muhsin High School and passed her Higher Secondary Certificate (HSC) exam from Kumudini Government College. She was studying for an honors degree at Jagannath University when she applied for a job with Bangladesh Railway in 2003. She continued her studies after she got the job in 2004, eventually completing a BSS, BEd, and master's degree from Kabi Nazrul Government College.
