= Kazi Abdul Baset =

- Born: December 4, 1935; Dhaka, Bengal Presidency, British India
- Died: May 23, 2002 (aged 66); Dhaka, Bangladesh
- Occupation: Painter

Kazi Abdul Baset (December 4, 1935 – May 23, 2002) was a Bangladeshi painter and art teacher. He was awarded Ekushey Padak in 1991 by the Government of Bangladesh.

== Education and career ==
Baset was born to Abdul Jalil and Nurjahan Begum. He passed his matriculation from Muslim Government High School in Dhaka in 1951. In 1956, he completed his bachelor's in fine arts from the Government Art Institute (later Faculty of Fine Arts, University of Dhaka) in Dhaka. With a Fulbright Fellowship he got higher training in painting at the Art Institute of Chicago University during 1963–1964. He then joined the head of Drawing and Painting Department of the Government Art Institute. He retired from the institute in 1995.

== Awards ==
- Bangladesh Shilpakala Academy Award (1982)
- Srijnab Atisha Dipankar Gold Medal (1987)
- Bangladesh Fine Arts Sangsad Award (1989)
- Ekushey Padak (1991)
