= Mohammedan Literary Society =

Literary society of Muslims in British India

- Formation: 1863
- Defunct: 1930
- Legal status: Succeeded by the "Muslim Institute of Calcutta"
- Headquarters: Calcutta, Bengal Presidency, British India
- Region served: British India

Mohammedan Literary Society was a literary society of Muslims in British India. Based in Calcutta, it was established in 1863 and was succeeded by the Muslim Institute of Calcutta in 1930.

== History ==
Mohammedan Literary Society was founded by Nawab Abdul Latif in 1863 in Calcutta. The society was located at Latif's residence in 16 Taltala, Kolkata. Latif was the secretary of the society while Prince Mahomed Ruheemoodin of Mysore was the president. The society had two vice-presidents, Prince Mahomed Nusseroodin Hyder of Mysore and Prince Mirza Jahan Kader Bahadur, the son-in-law of the Prince of Oudh. Notable members in the governing committee included Nawab Asman Jah Bahadur and Prince Mahomed Bakhtyar Shah. The patron of the society was the Lieutenant Governor of Bengal. The society used Arabic, English, Persian, and Urdu languages.

The goal of the society was the education of Muslim youth in English medium schools that would allow them to compete with their English and Hindu peers. The society held gathering annually in Kolkata Town Hall. In the meeting in 1865 was attended by over 2000 people including Christians, Hindus, Jews, and Muslims. The society was a gathering place Indian royals such as the Maharaja of Indore, Sultan Shah Jahan, Begum of Bhopal, the rajas of Jaipur State, Maharaja of Patiala, and the Raja of Cooch Behar State. The society campaigned for the utilization of the Mohsin Fund and drew attention of the British government to the educational needs of the Muslim community of India. It survived till 1930, at which point its name changed to Muslim Institute of Calcutta.
