= Muhammad Mohsin =

Bengali philanthropist (c.1732–1812)

Haji Muhammad Mohsin মুহাম্মদ মহসিন
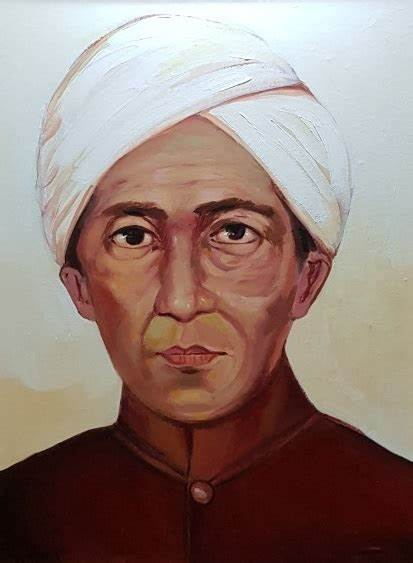
- Born: c. 1732; Hooghly, Bengal, Mughal Empire (now West Bengal, India)
- Died: 1812 (aged 79–80); Hooghly, Bengal, British India (now West Bengal, India)
- Burial place: Hooghly Imambara, Chinsurah, West Bengal, India
- Known for: Philanthropy
- Title: Dānavīr (Hero of Charity)

Religious life
- Religion: Islam
- Denomination: Shia

Haji Muhammad Mohsin (c. 1732 – 29 November 1812) was a prominent Bengali Muslim philanthropist and Educator. His most notable contribution was establishing the Hooghly Mohsin College and the Hooghly Imambara. He also played a significant role during the Great Bengal famine of 1770 by helping thousands of victims.

== Early life ==
Mohsin was born into a Bengali Shia Muslim family to Haji Faizullah and Zainab Khanam in Bengal in 1143 AH (1731–1732 AD). He was home-schooled and gained knowledge in the study of the Quran, Hadith and the Fiqh. Later, he went on a voyage to other countries of Asia, including the regions in current-day Iran, Iraq, Turkey and the Arab peninsula. He also made the pilgrimage to Mecca, and visited Medina, Kufa, Karbala and other holy places. After performing the Hajj, he was given the title Haji.

== Philanthropy ==
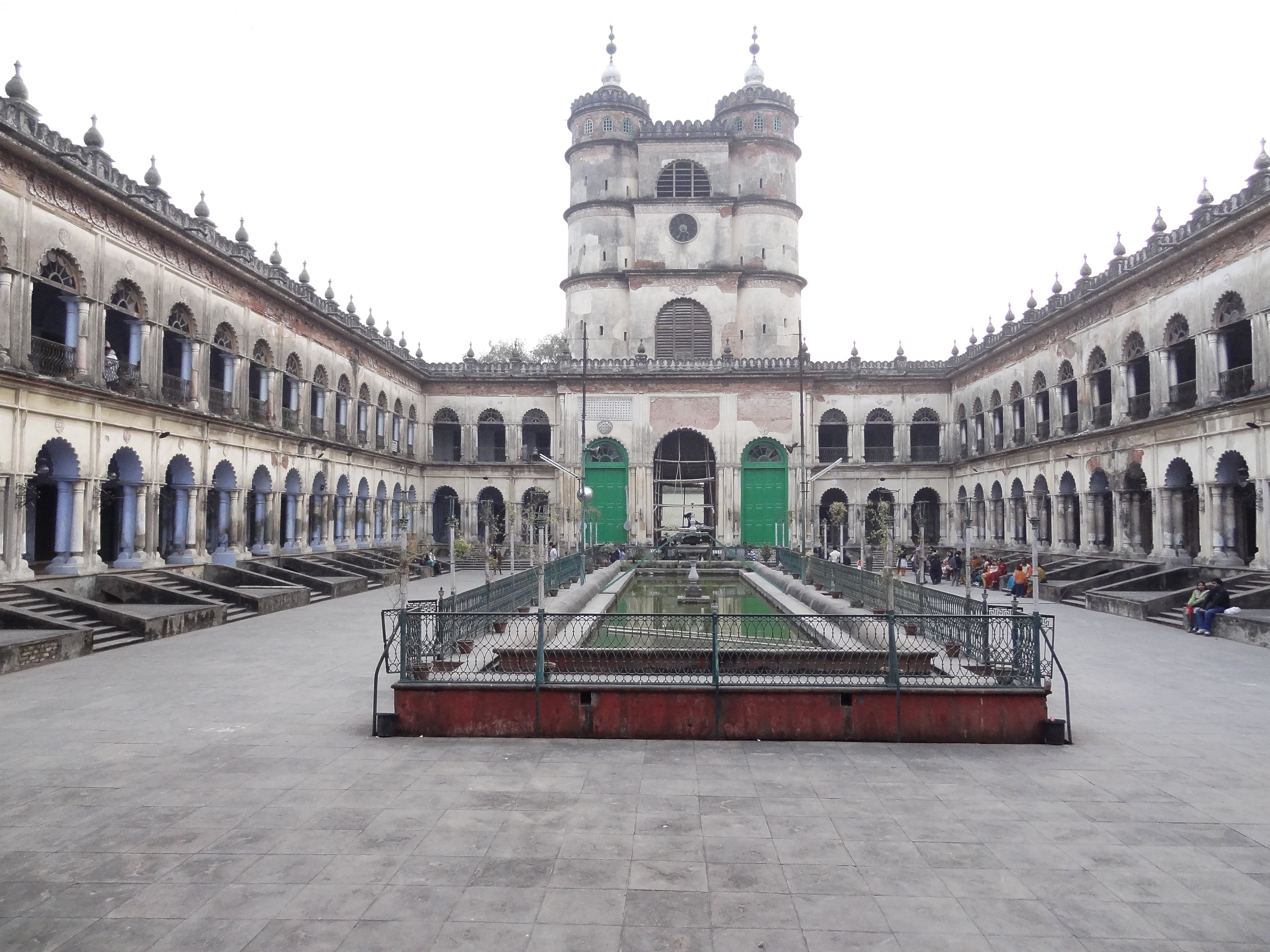
Hooghly Imambara founded by Haji Muhammad Mohsin at Hooghly

Following his return, Mohsin took over the management of the estate of his half-sister, Munnujan. She was the widow of Mirza Salahuddin, the Naib-faujdar or deputy military governor of Hooghly working for the Nawab of Bengal. She inherited a fortune from her mother Zainab, whose first husband Aga Motahar had much land and properties in Hooghly, Jessore, Murshidabad and Nadia.

After Munnujan's death in 1803, Mohsin inherited all of her fortune. He bequeathed this fortune for charity and created a Waqf or trust in 1806, with his entire wealth of 156,000 taka. One-third of his fortune was to be donated for education and religious programmes, four-ninths for pensions to the elderly and disabled, and the remaining two-ninths for the expenses of the two trustees.

== Death and legacy ==
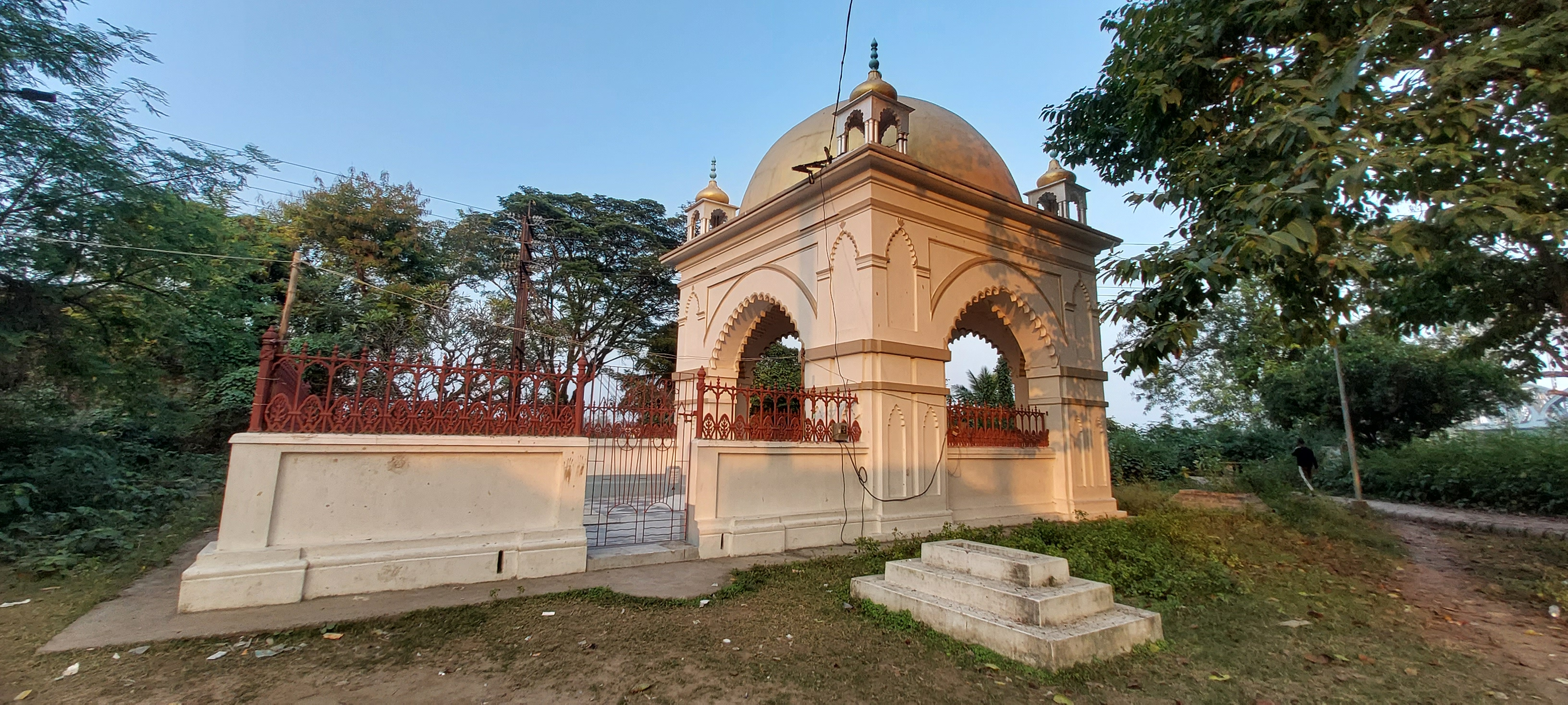
Grave of Haji Muhammad Mohsin

Mohsin died on 29 November 1812. His grave is situated in Hooghly Muslim Cemetery near Hooghly Imambara.

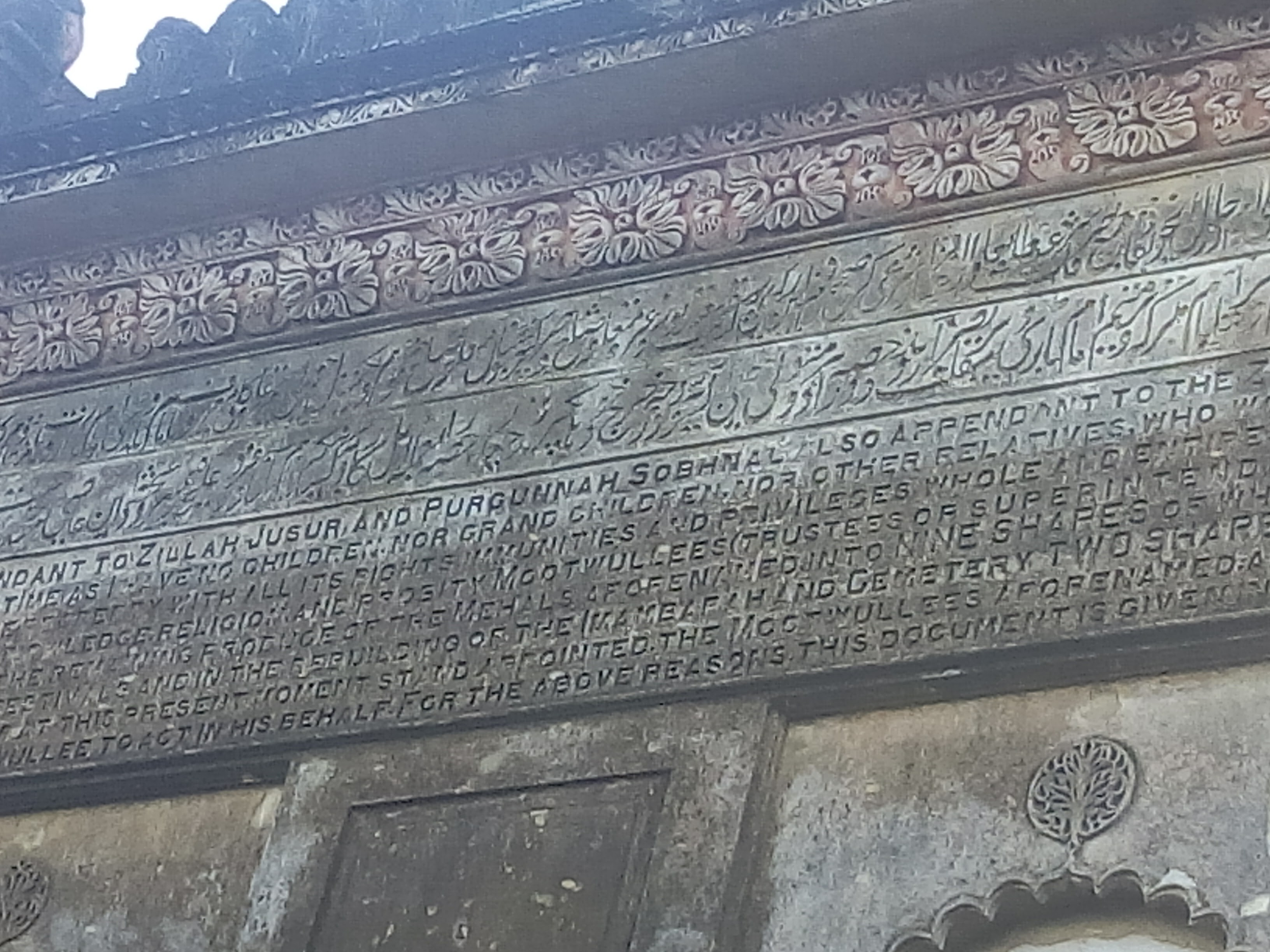
The wall inscription of Hooghly Imambara in West Bengal, writing about activities of its founder and philanthropist Muhammad Mohsin.

Due to his contributions in the field of education, Mohsin is the namesake of many educational institutions in India and Bangladesh. The New Hooghly College in Chinsurah, West Bengal, which now bears his name as the Hooghly Mohsin College was established by him. In Bangladesh, he is the namesake of Hazi Mohammad Mohsin Government High School and Government Hazi Mohammad Mohsin College in Chittagong, Haji Muhammad Mohsin Government High School Rajshahi in Rajshahi, Government Hazi Mohammad Mohsin College in Khulna, Mohsinia Madrasa, Dhaka (at present Kabi Nazrul Government College) and the Haji Muhammad Mohsin Hall in University of Dhaka.

Mohsin is also the namesake of a Bangladesh Navy base BNS Haji Mohsin located in Dhaka. Commendably, Mohipur Hazi Mohsin Government College is located at Panchbibi, Joypurhat as founded by Maulana Abdul Hamid Khan Bhasani.
