= Hooghly Imambara =

Shia Islam mosque in Hooghly, West Bengal, India

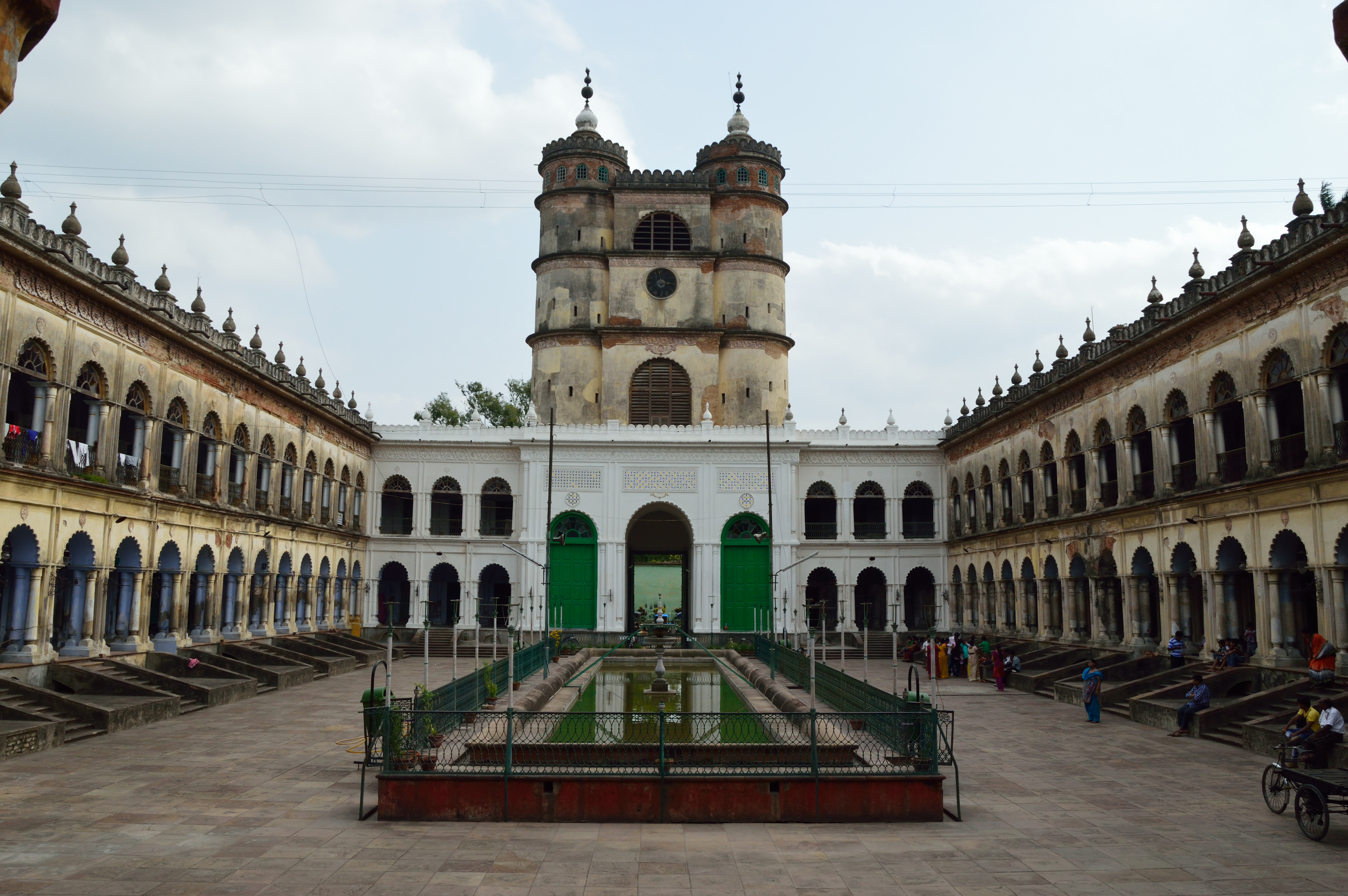
- Main façade and clocktower of the Imambara

- Location of the imambara in West Bengal

Religion
- Affiliation: Shia (Twelver)
- Ecclesiastical or organizational status: Mosque and Imambara
- Status: Active

Location
- Location: Hooghly, Hooghly district, West Bengal
- Country: India
- Interactive map of Hooghly Imambara
- Coordinates: 22°54′30″N 88°24′00″E

Architecture
- Type: Mosque architecture
- Style: Indo-Islamic
- Founder: Muhammad Mohsin
- Groundbreaking: 1841
- Completed: 1861

Website
- hooghlyimambargah.com

The Hooghly Imambara is a Twelver Shia congregation hall and mosque, located in Hooghly, in the state of West Bengal, India. The construction of the building was started by Muhammad Mohsin in 1841 and completed in 1861. The building is a two-storied structure, with a tall clock tower over the entrance gate. The mosque has intricate designs and texts from Quran engraved on the wall. The interior of the mosque is decorated with marbles, candles and hanging lanterns.

== Clock ==
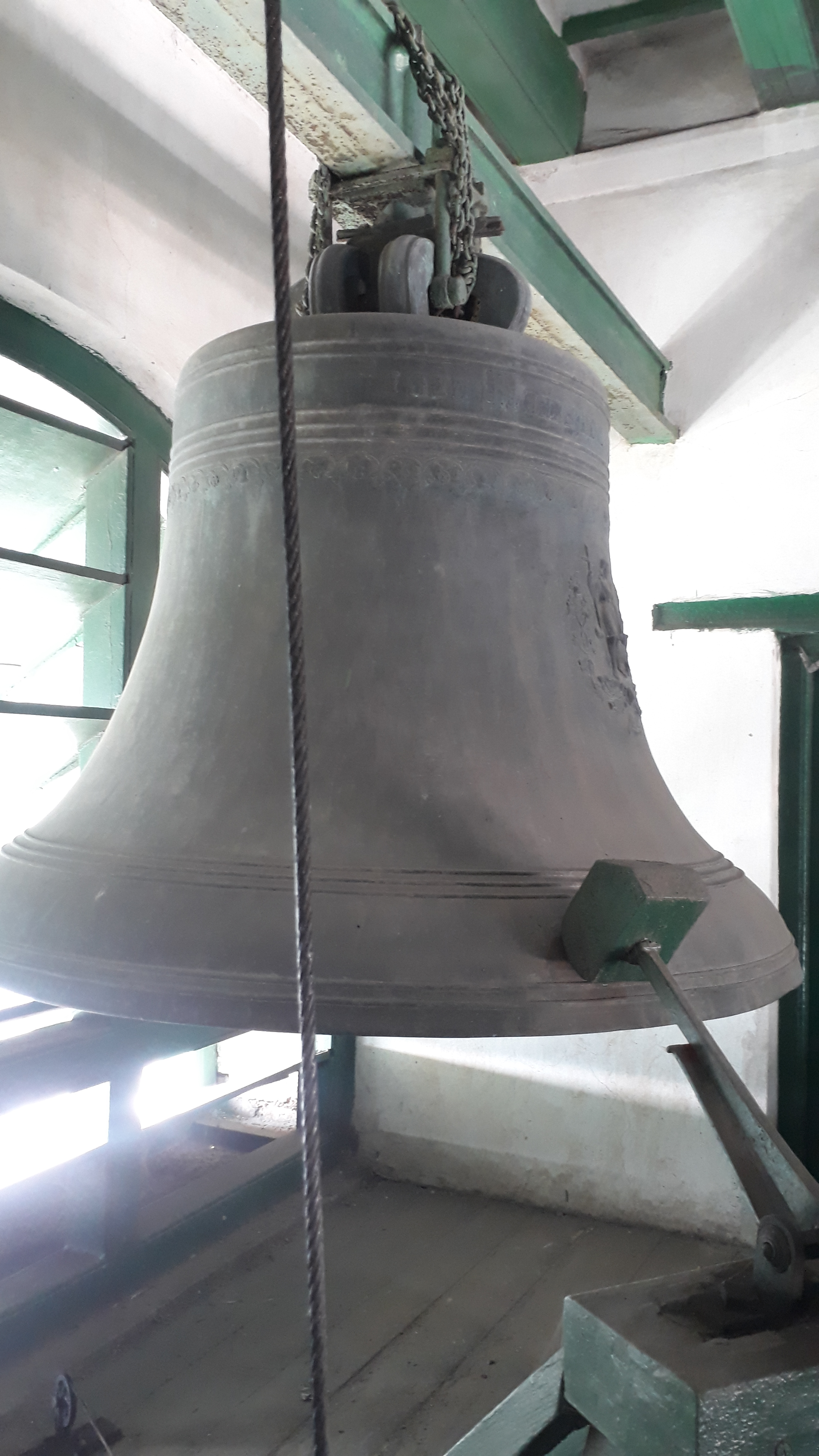
Vaunted clock of the Imambara tower

The Hooghly Imambara is famous for its vaunted clock. It is at the middle of the twin towers constructed on the doorway of the main entrance. Each tower, is approximately 46 metres (150 ft) high, with 152 steps to reach to its top. The clock has two dials with three bells that weigh 80 mds, 40 mds and 30 mds. Smaller bells ring at an interval of 15 minutes and larger bell rings to signify one hour. The clock requires two people to wind it for half an hour of each week, with a key that weighs 20 kilograms (44 lb). The clock was bought for Rs. 11,721 (in 1852) by Syed Keramat Ali from the manufacturer: M/s Black & Hurray Co., Big Ben, London.

== Accessibility ==
People who come from Kolkata typically to take a train to Naihati Junction railway station, and then they catch the Bandel local train to the Hooghly Ghat station. From there, the Imambara is a short walking distance. There are rickshaws and autos to ferry visitors to the Imambara from the station.

An alternative is to access the Imambara via Howrah railway station and access the straight trains (local EMUs), which are more frequent and less crowded, to Bandel. From the Hooghly railway station, autos, totos, and rickshaws provide easy access to the Imambara.

== Gallery ==
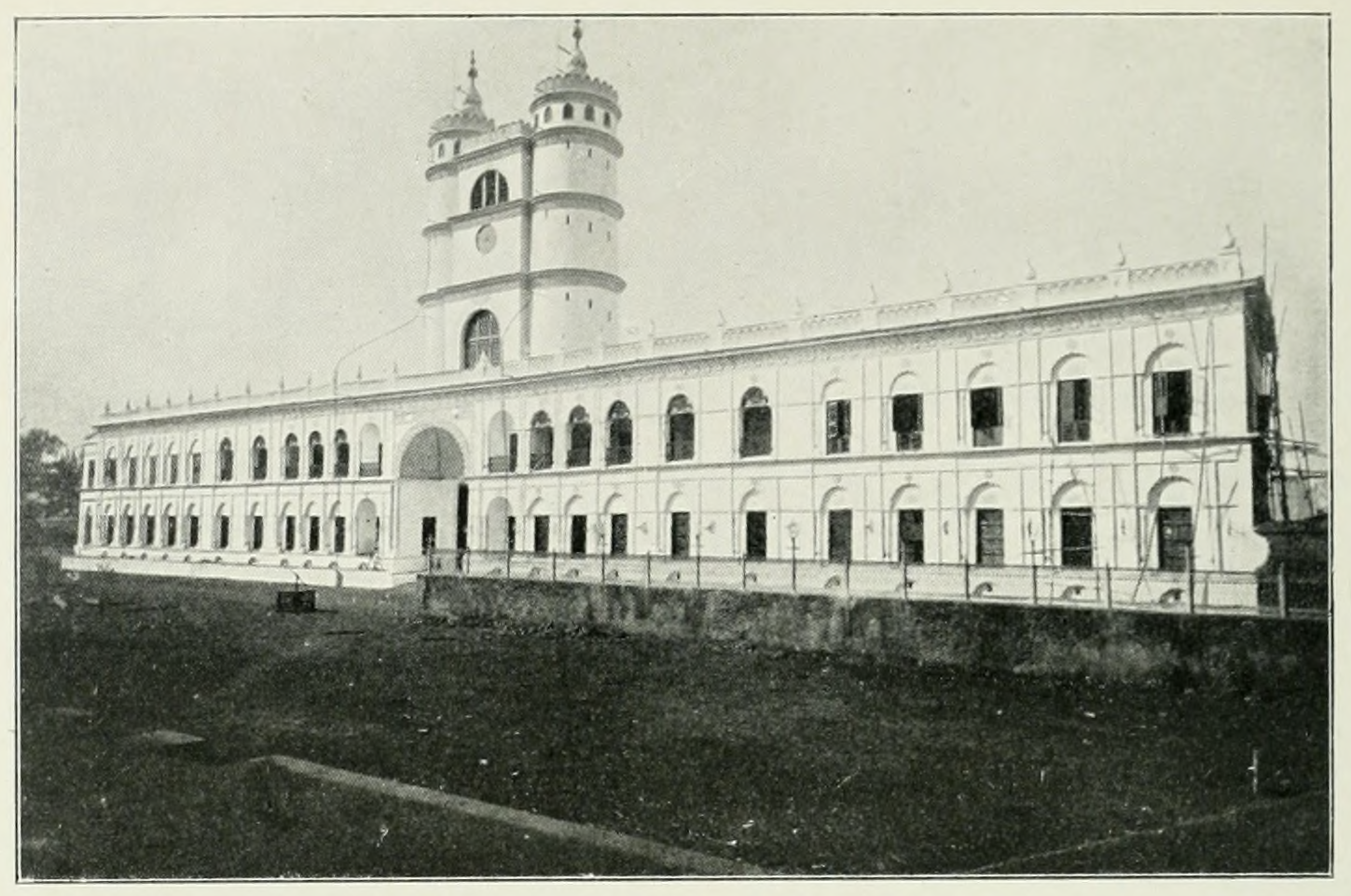
Photograph of the Imambara from Calcutta, Past & Present, by Kathleen Blechynden

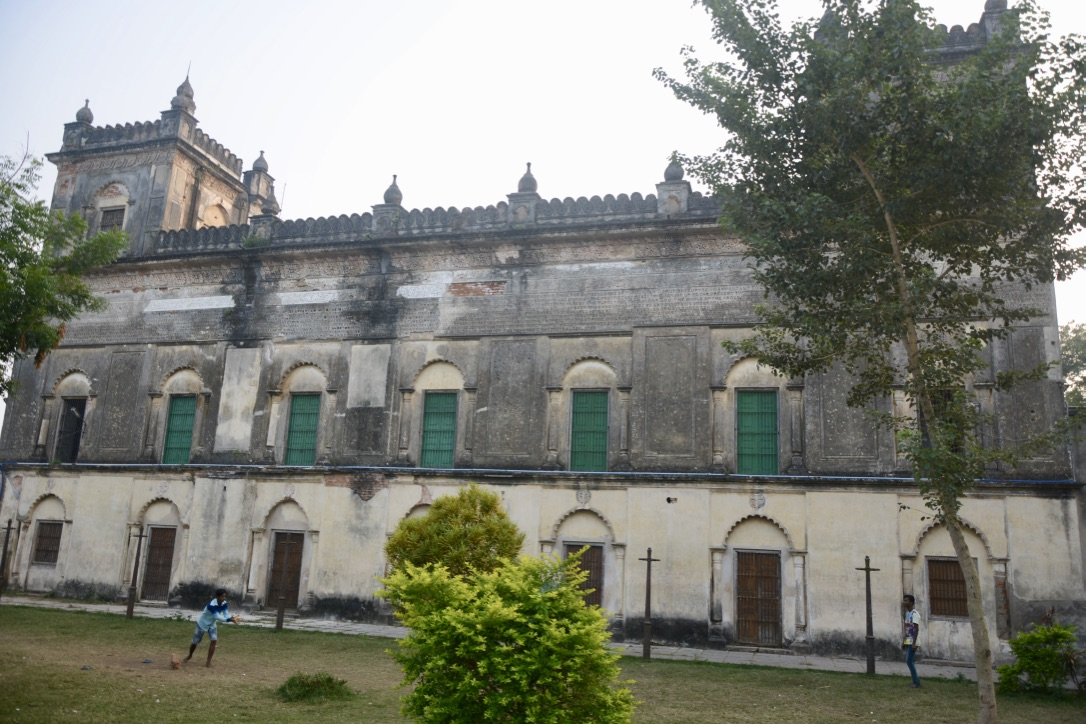
The rear portion of the Imambara

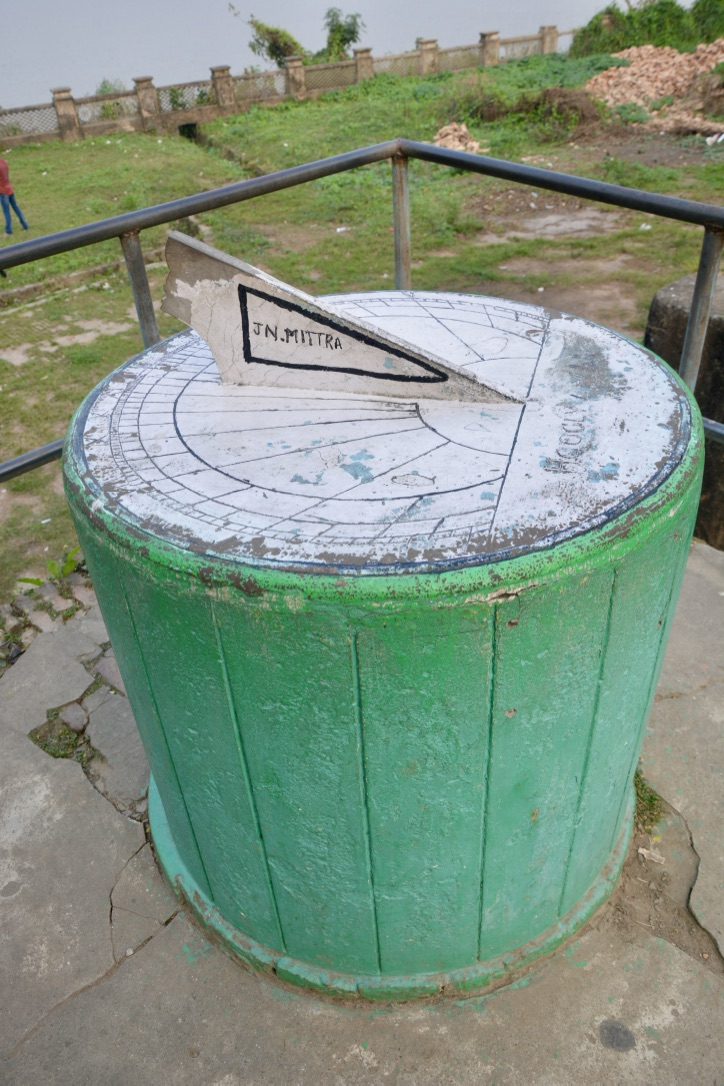
The sun dial of the Imambara

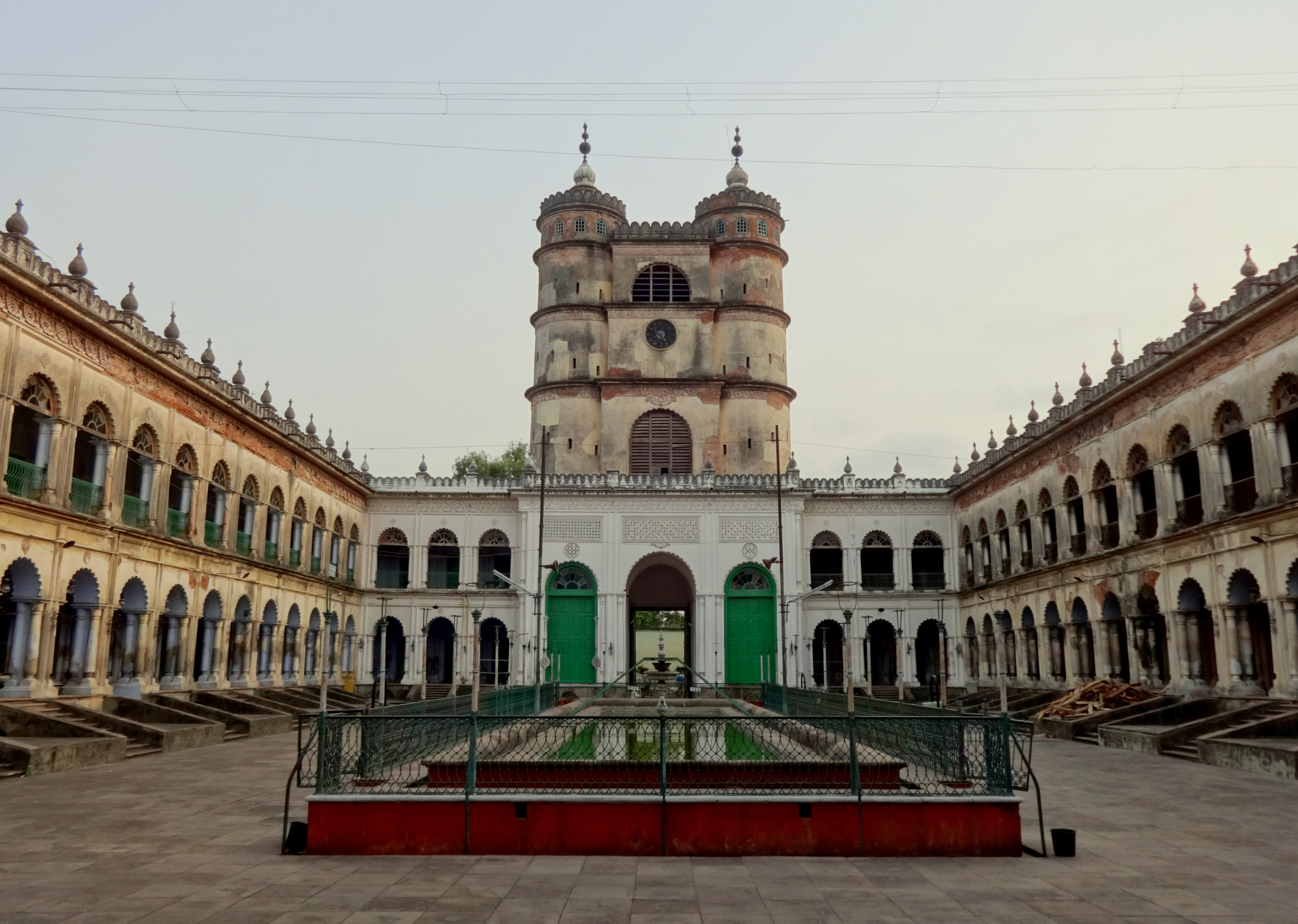
Imambara courtyard

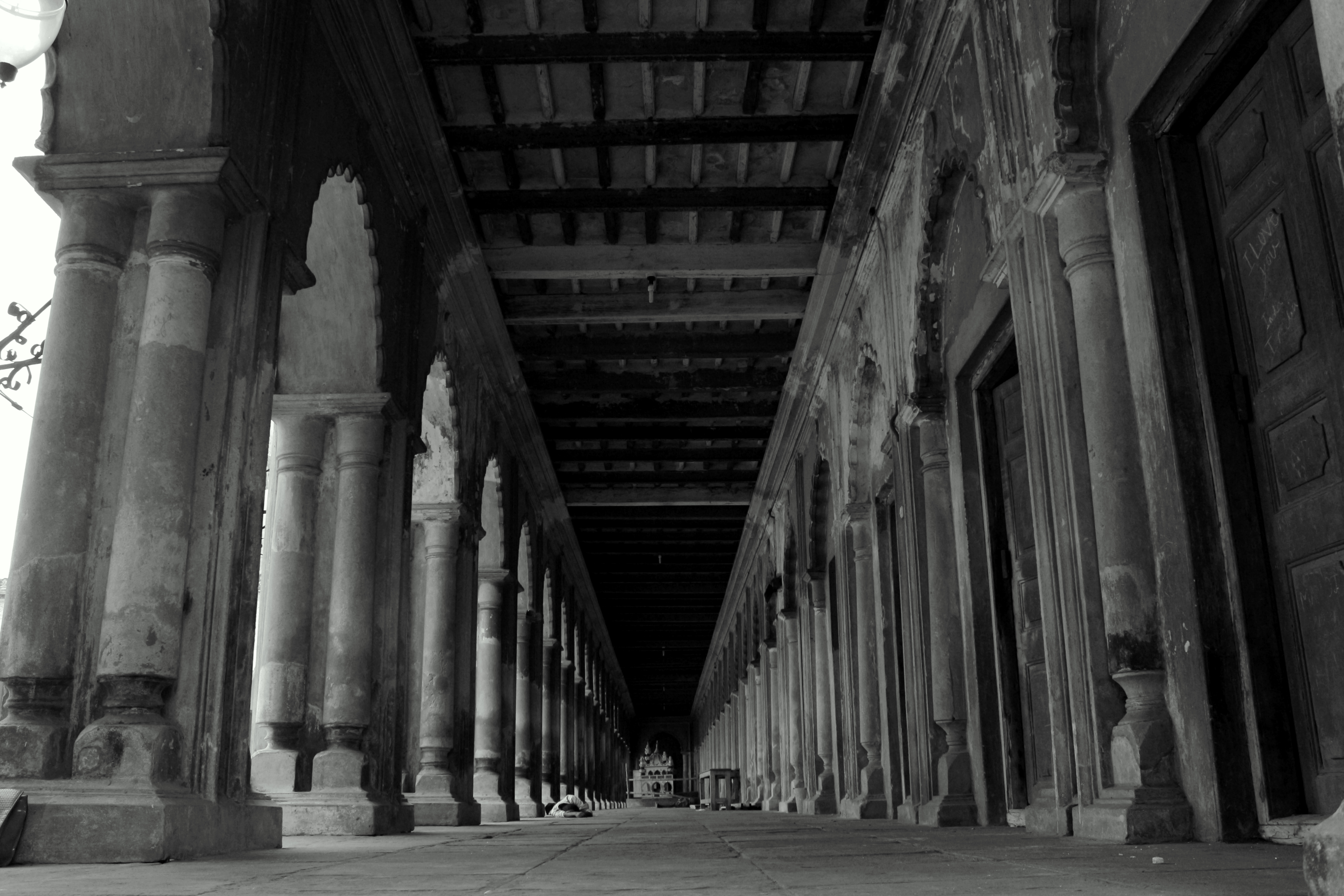
B&W version

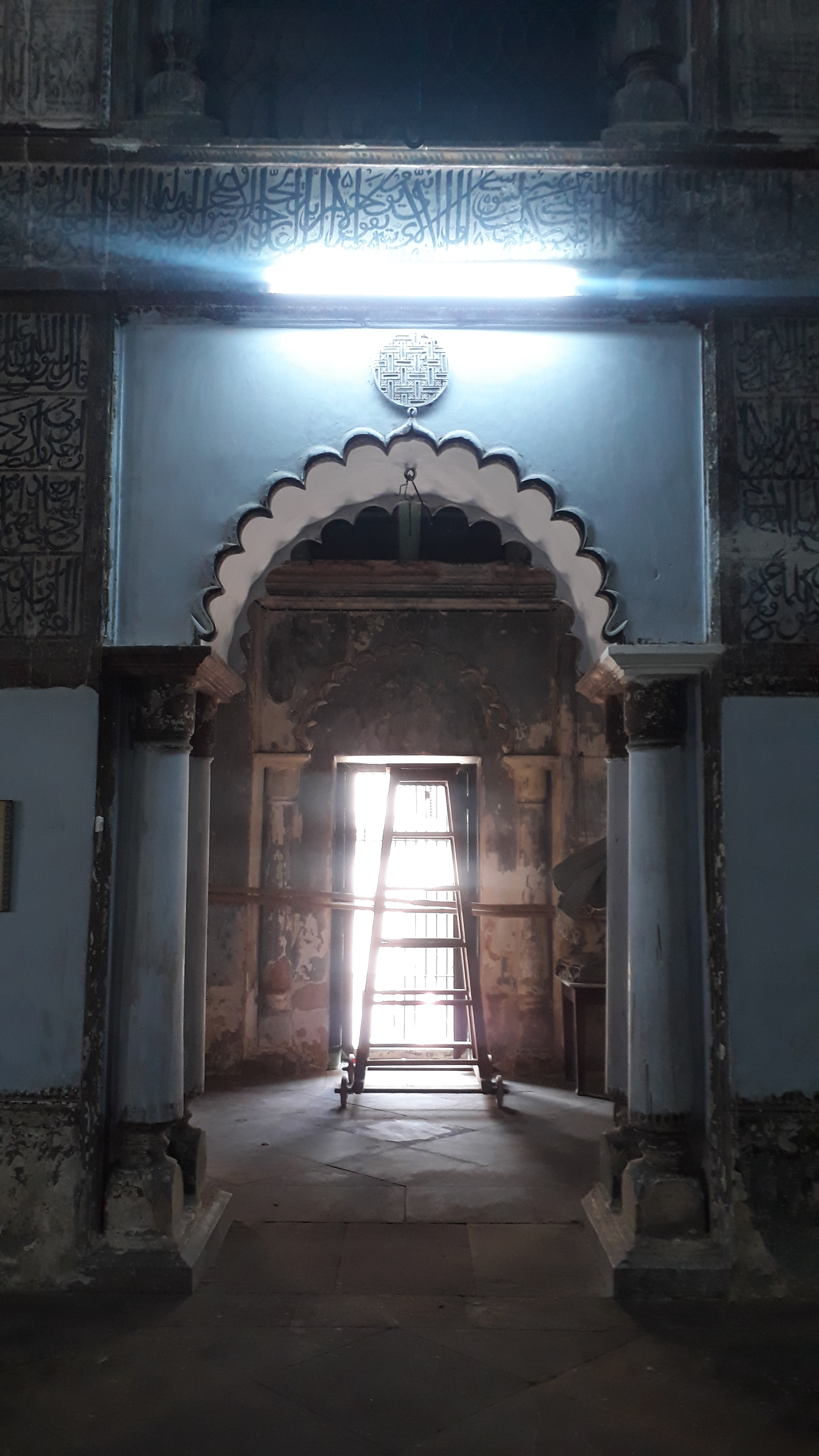
Inside the prayer hall

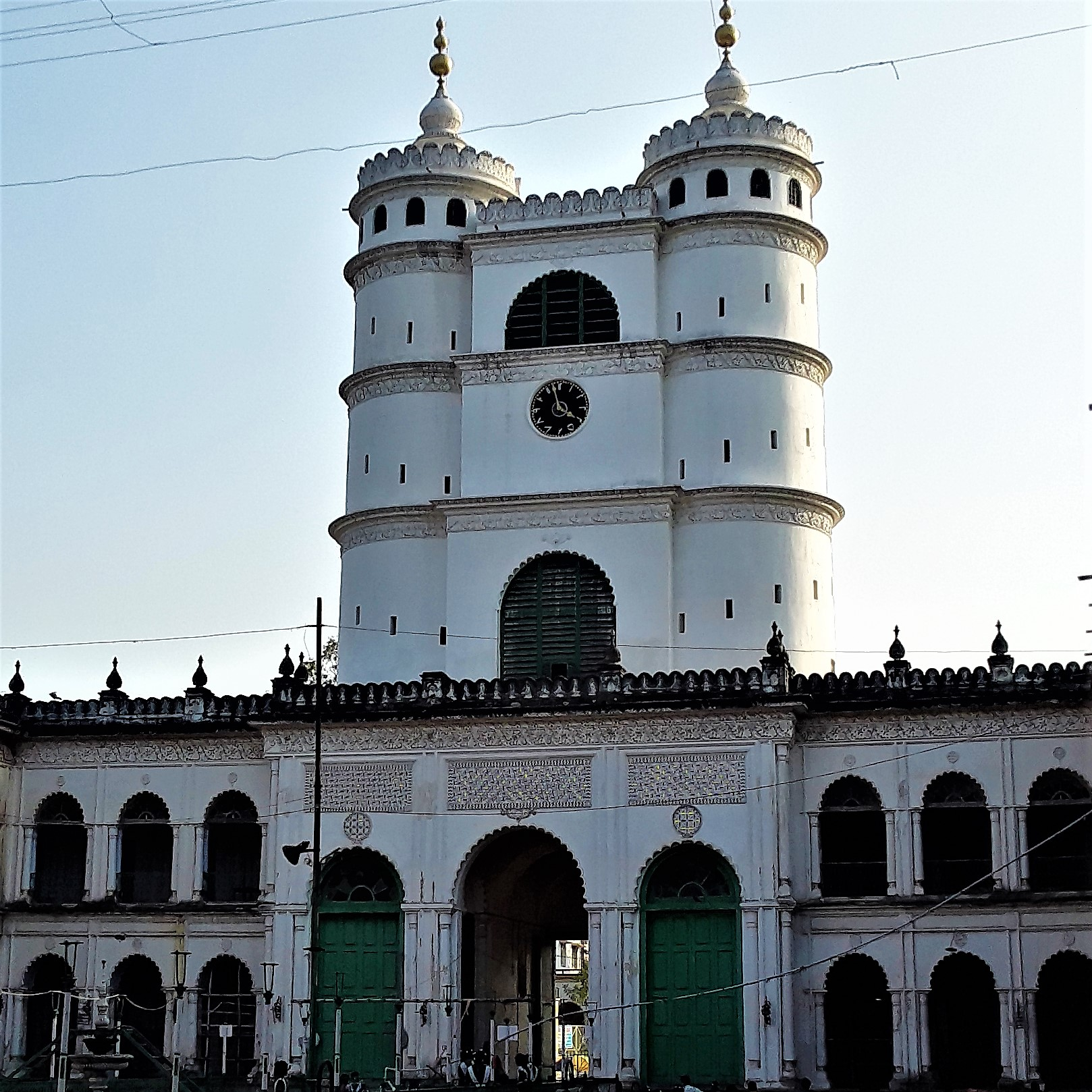
Clock tower

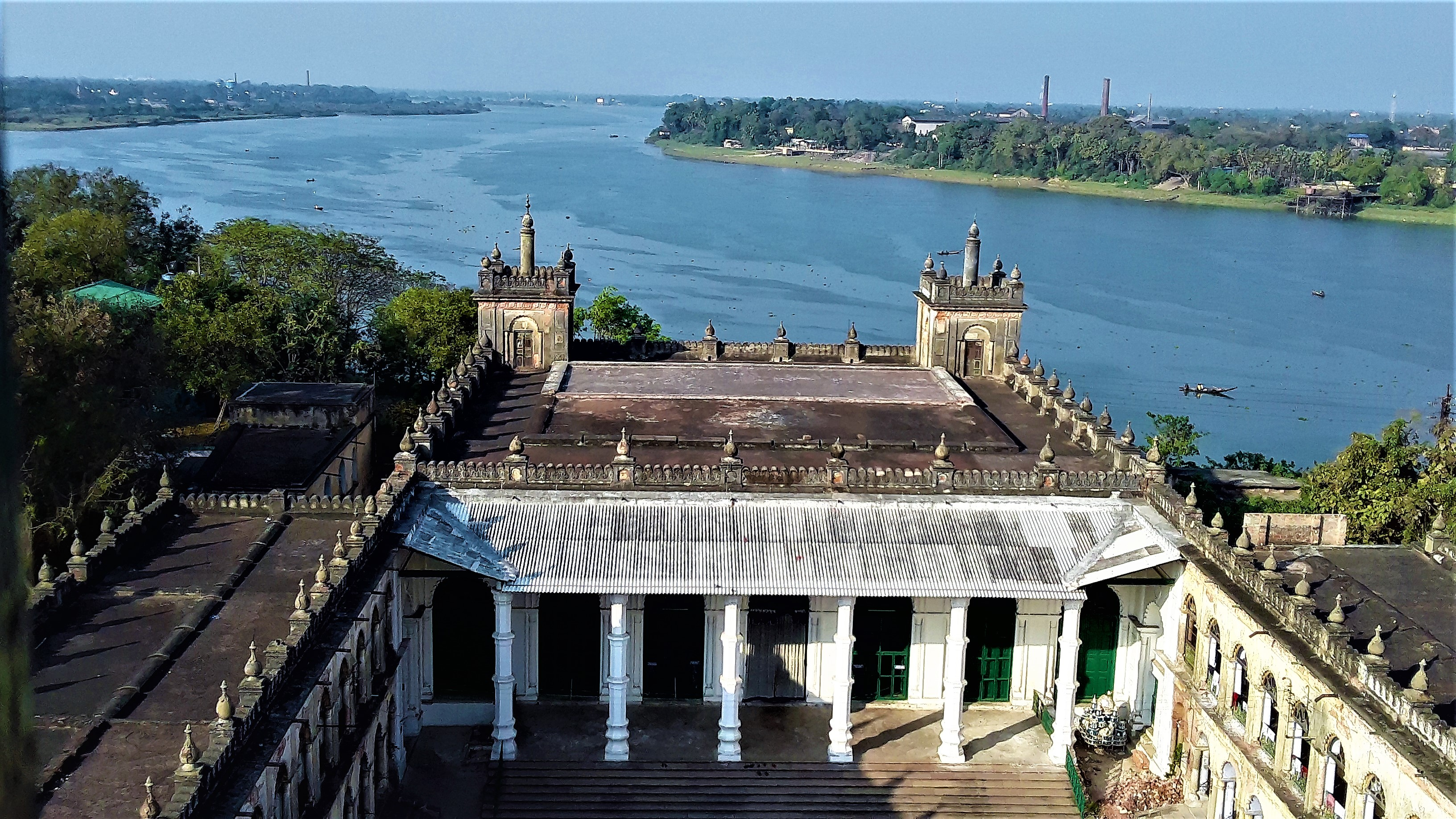
View of the Hooghly River from the clock tower

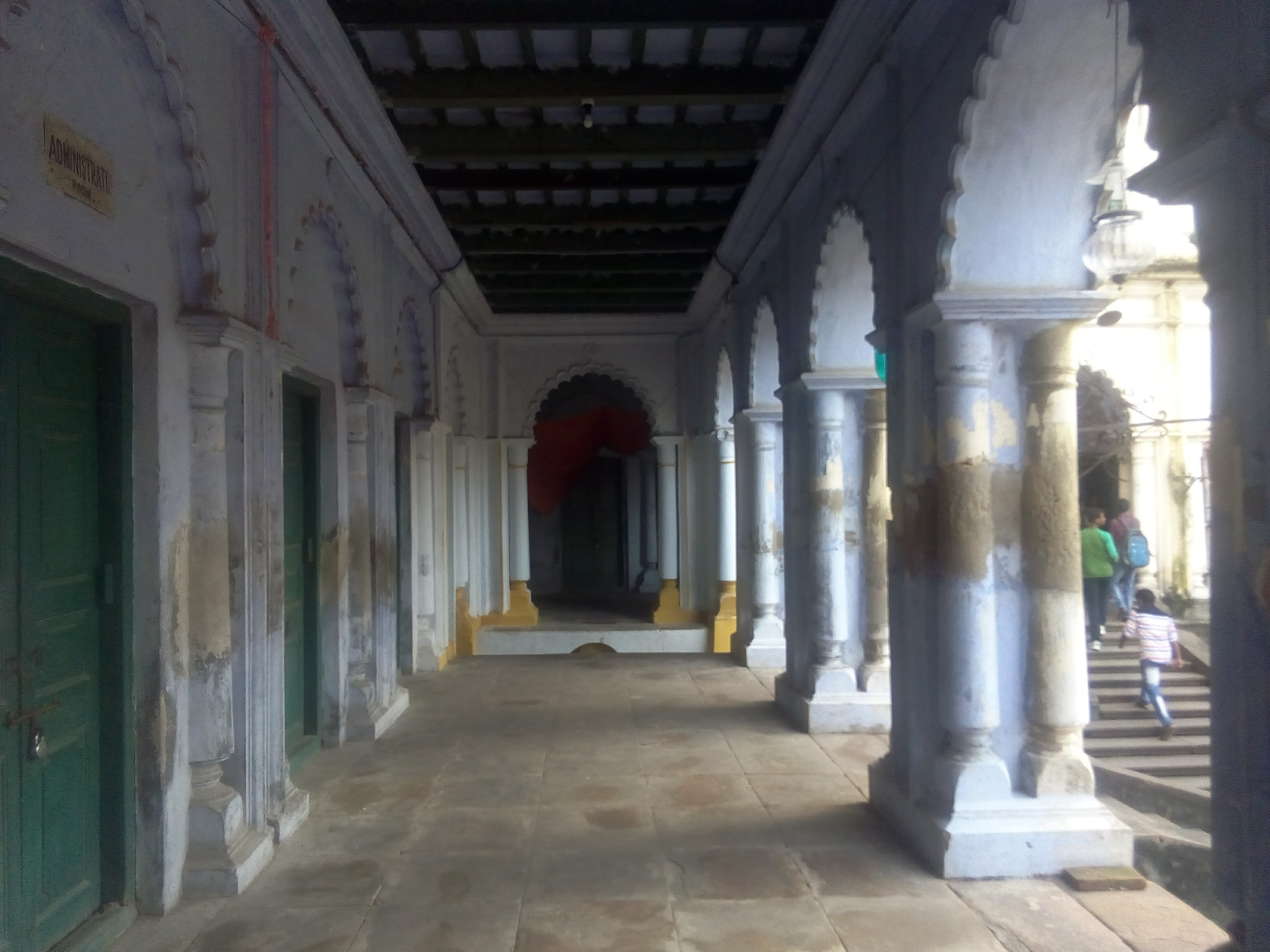
An inside view

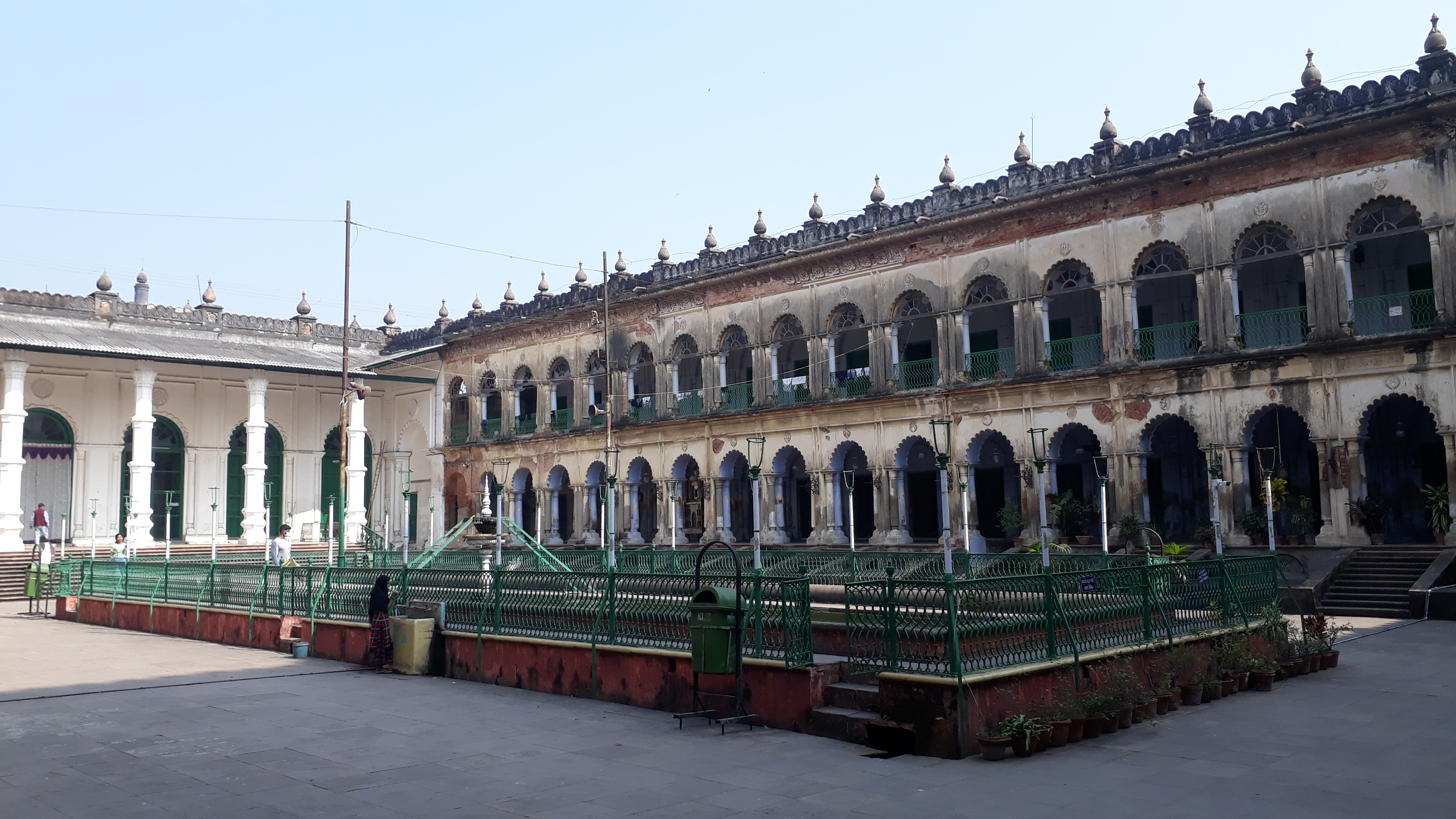
Courtyard

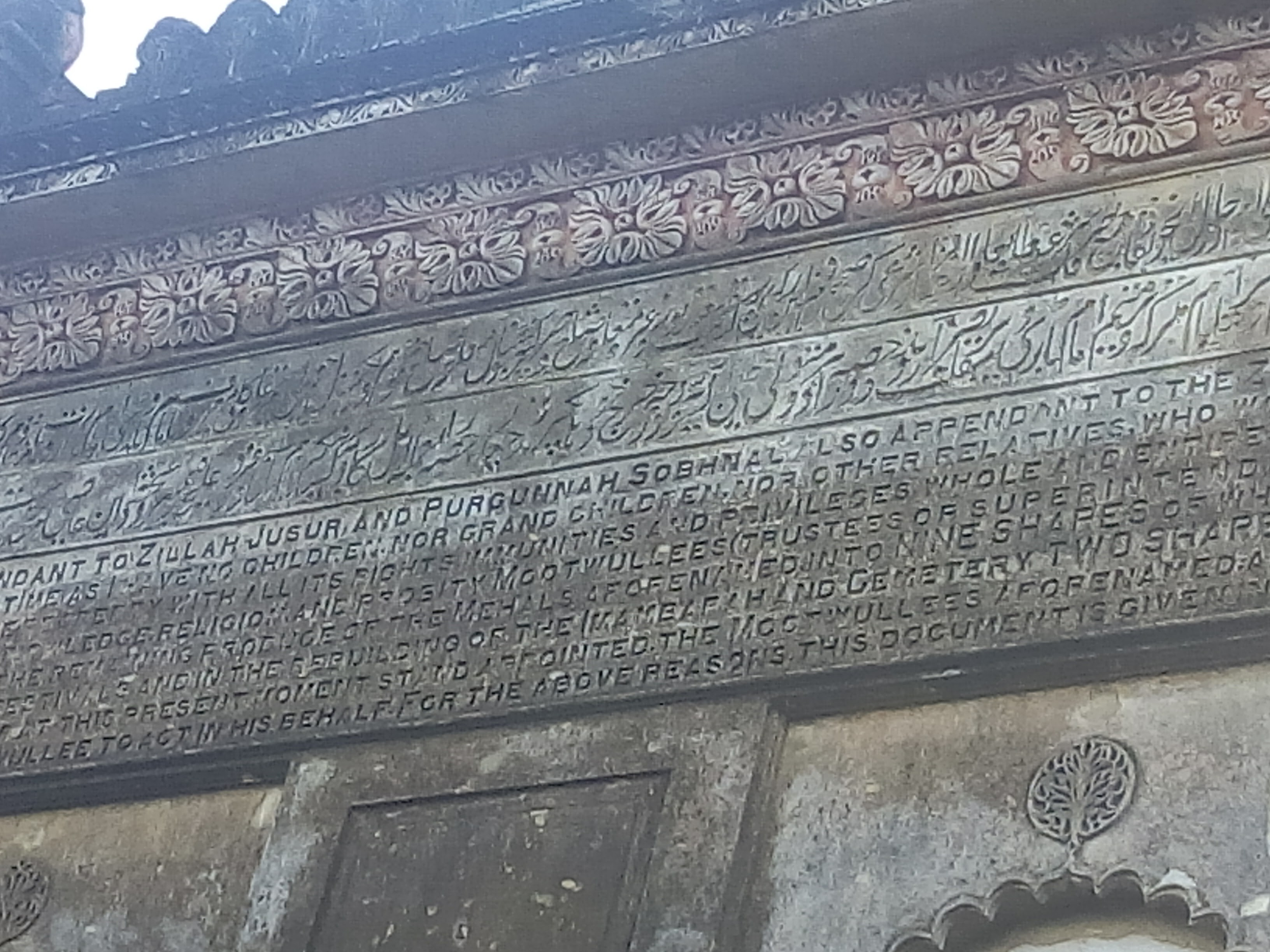
The inscription about activities of Muhammad Mohsin

== See also ==
- Shia Islam in India
- List of mosques in India
