= Kabi Nazrul Government College =

Public college in Dhaka, Bangladesh

Coordinates: 23°42′35″N 90°24′48″E

- কবি নজরুল সরকারি কলেজ
- Crest of Kabi Nazrul Government College
- Former names: Dhaka Madrasah (1915); Dhaka High Madrasah (1916-1926); Islamia Intermediate College (1926-1968)
- Motto: জ্ঞানই আলো
- Motto in English: Wisdom is light
- Type: Public School; Public College
- Established: 1874; 152 years ago
- Founder: Haji Muhammad Mohsin
- Parent institution: Dhaka Central University
- Affiliations: Dhaka Education Board
- Chancellor: President of Bangladesh
- Vice-Chancellor: Md. Lutfor Rahaman
- Principal: Professor Muhammad Habibur Rahman
- Location: Luxmibazer, Old Dhaka, 1 Municipality Street, Dhaka, 1100, Bangladesh
- Campus: 1.2 hectares (3 acres); Urban
- Website: kabinazrulcollege.gov.bd

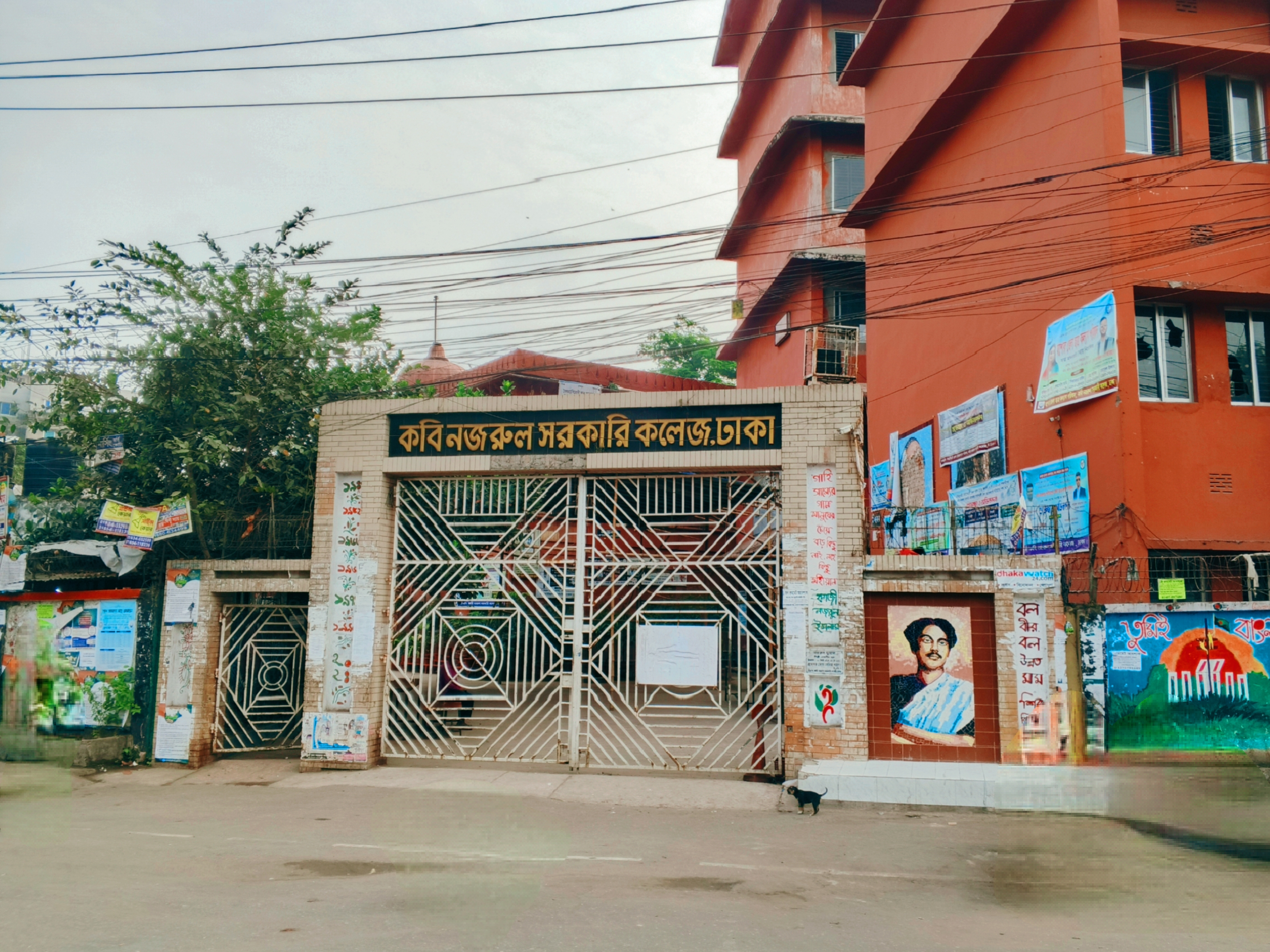
Kabi Nazrul Government College entrance

Kabi Nazrul Government College (Dhaka Central University Attached: Kabi Nazrul Government College, Dhaka) informally known as KNGC is a governmental college located in Luxmibazar, Dhaka, the capital of Bangladesh. It was formerly known as Govt. Kabi Nazrul College.

It offers higher secondary education (HSC) as well as bachelor's degree and master's degree programmes. Its former name was Mohasania Madrasa. The name of the institution has been changed four times, the current name is "Kabi Nazrul Govt. College." It was affiliated with the University of Dhaka from February 2017 to January 2025.

== History ==
In 1874, Mohasania Madrasah was established by a grant from the Mohsin Fund. It was built on the model of Calcutta Alia Madrasah (now Aliah University). The institute was later known as Dhaka Madrasah. In 1915, it became Dhaka High Madrasah. In 1916, the Anglo-Persian department became a separate school named Dhaka Government Muslim High School.

After the establishment of University of Dhaka in 1921, the school was upgraded to a college and renamed Islamia Intermediate College. In 1968, the college section was named Government College Dhaka and was given its current name in 1972.

== Academics ==
Kabi Nazrul Government College offers Higher Secondary Certificate, four-year honours and one-year master's courses in various majors.

=== Faculty of Science ===
- Botany
- Chemistry
- Geography & Environment
- Mathematics
- Zoology
- Physics

=== Faculty of Arts and Social Science ===
- Arabic
- Bengali
- Economics
- English
- History
- Islamic History and Culture
- Islamic Studies
- Philosophy
- Physical Exercise
- Political Science

=== Faculty of Business Studies ===
- Finance and Banking
- Accounting
- Management
- Marketing

== Landmarks ==
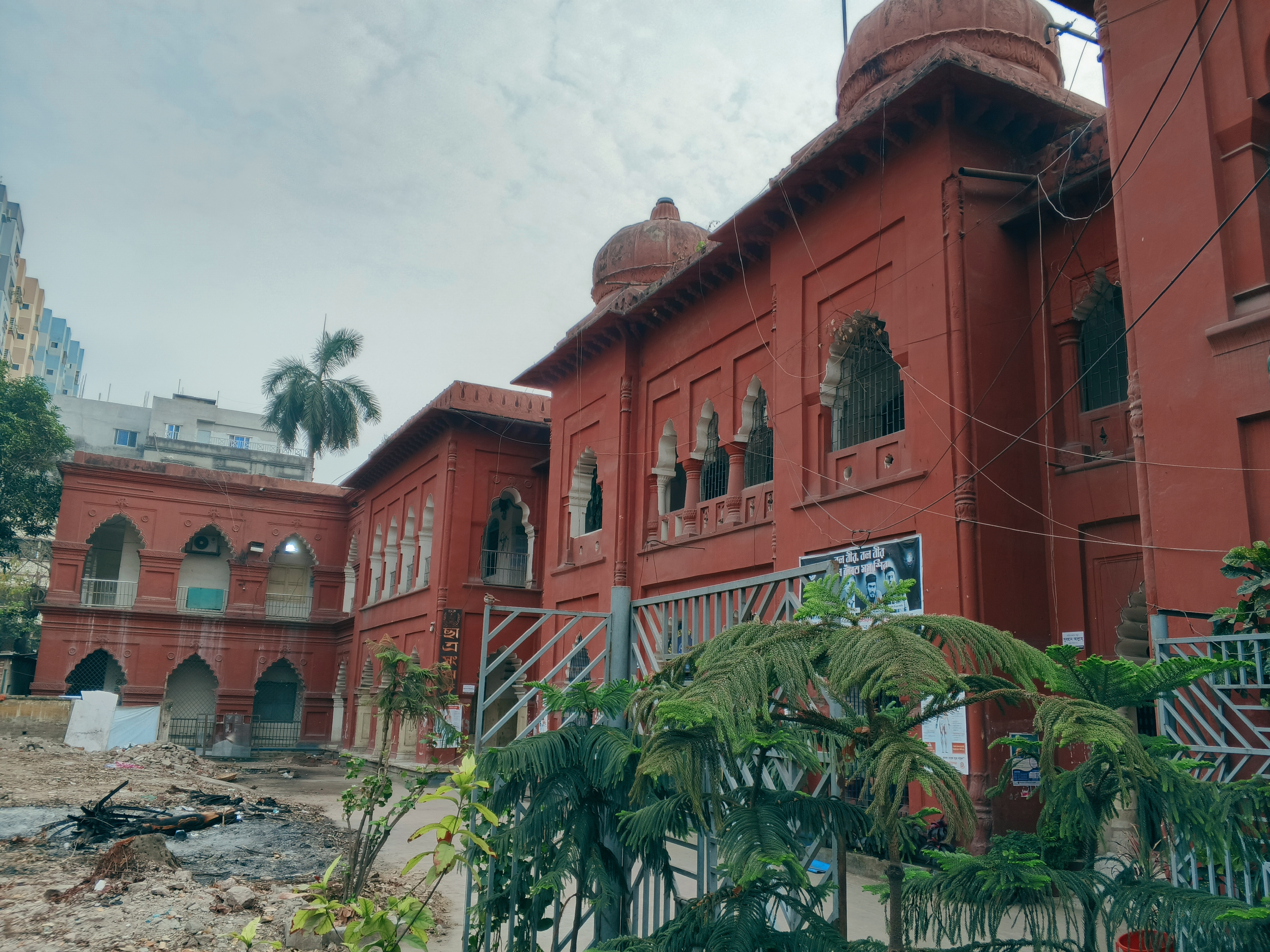
প্রশাসনিক ভবন

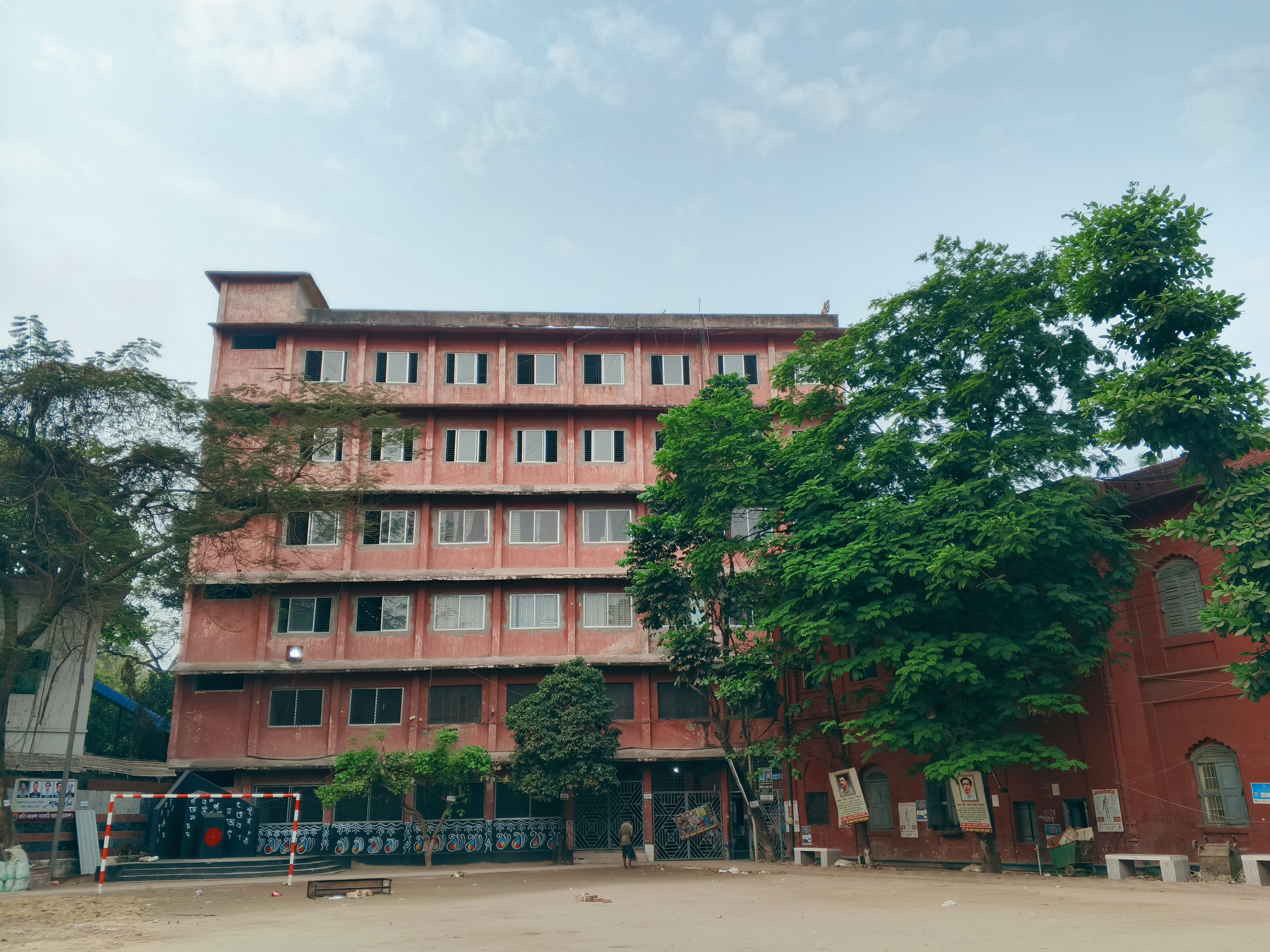
মাঠ থেকে ( ক্যাম্পাসের কিছু অংশ)

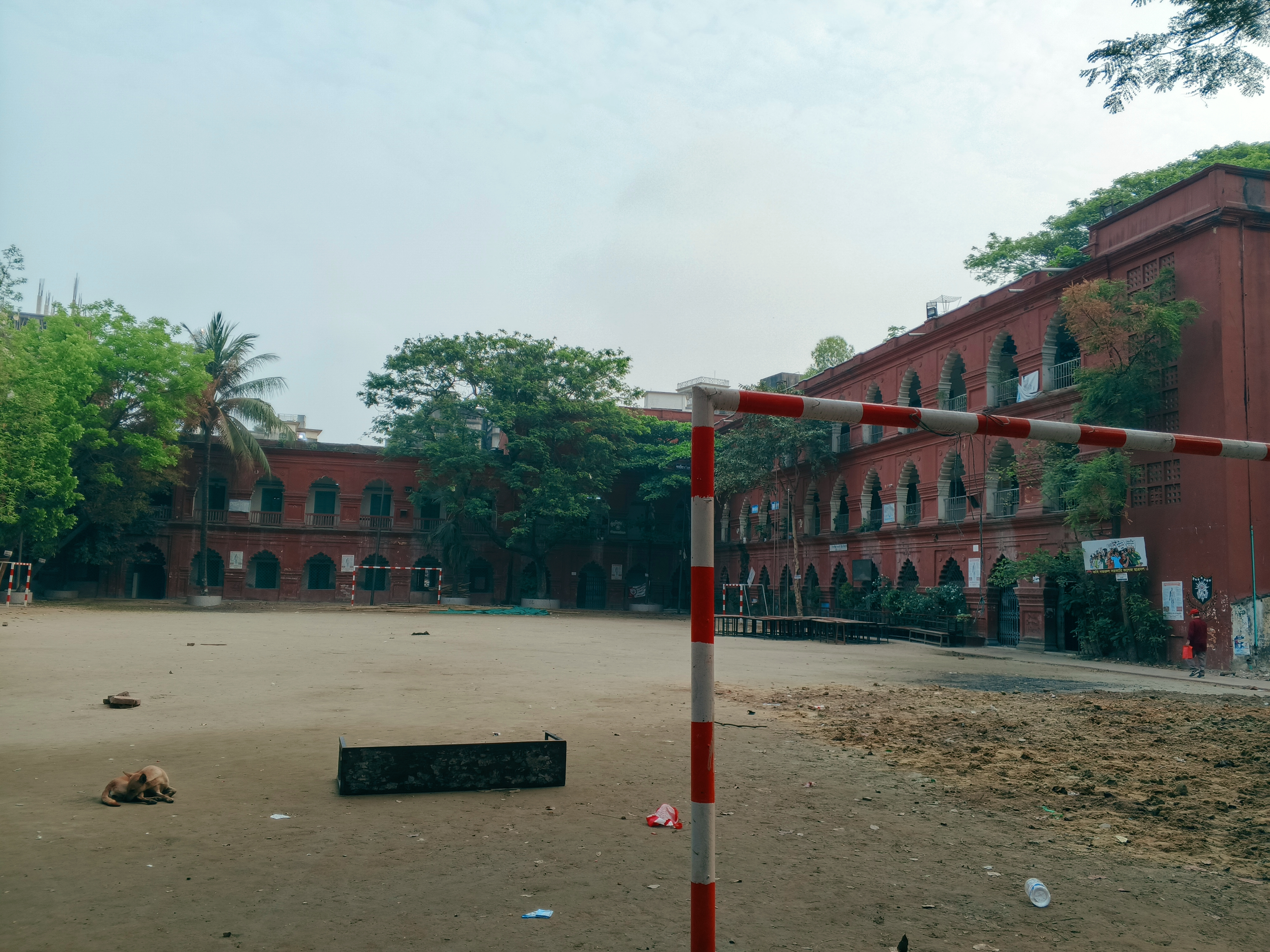
মাঠ থেকে ( ক্যাম্পাসের কিছু অংশ)

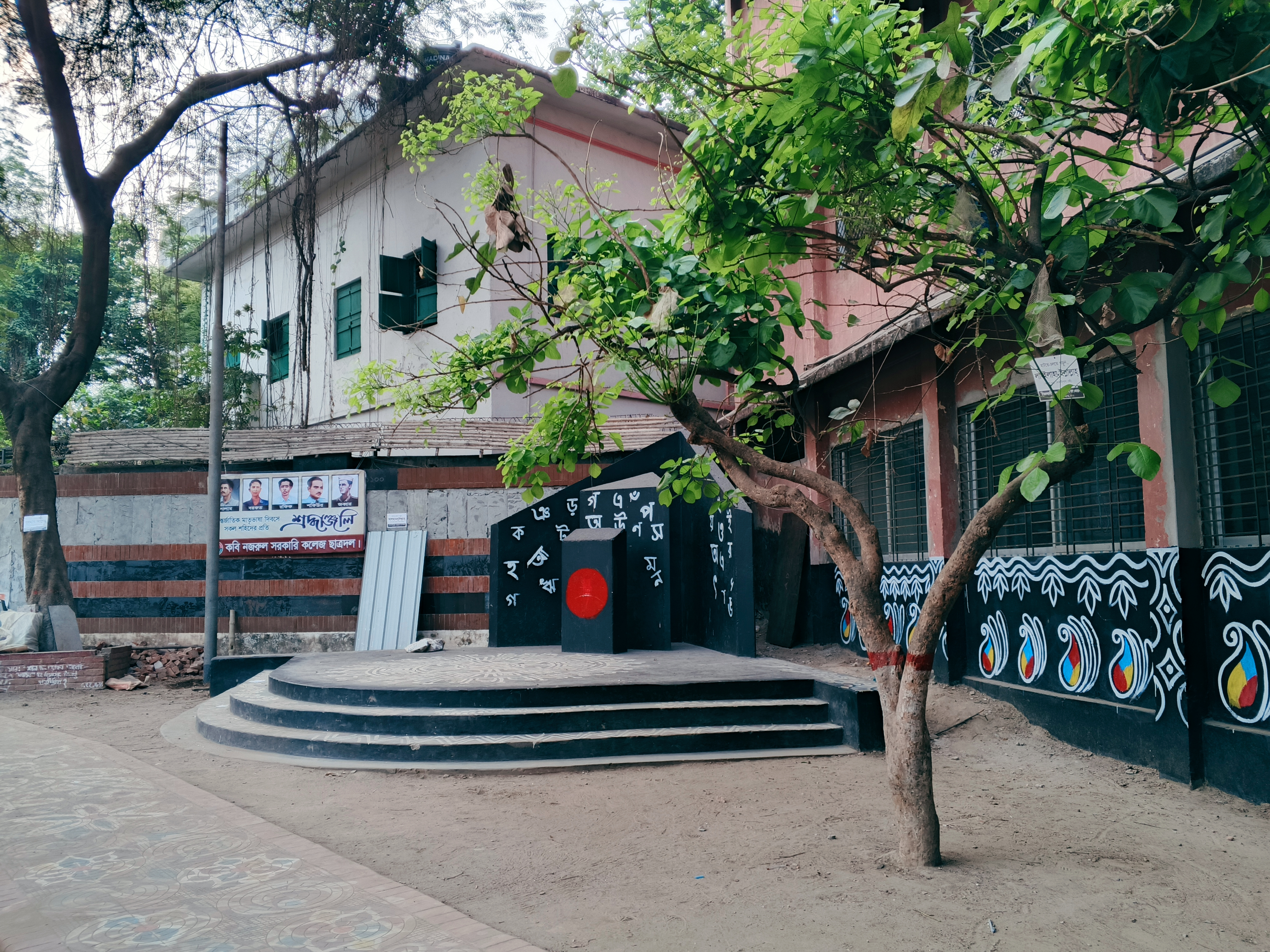
শহীদ মিনার

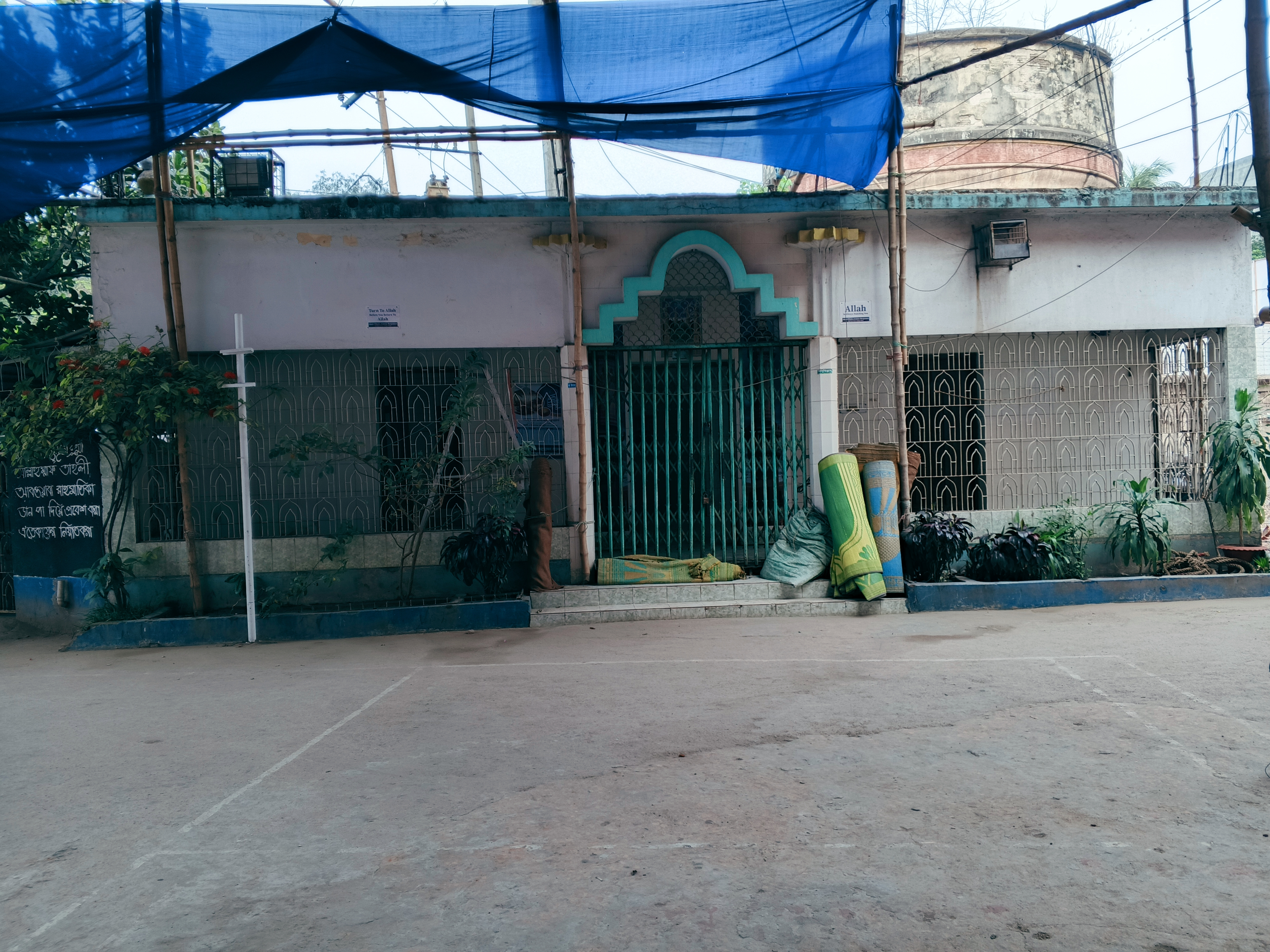
ক্যাম্পাস মসজিদ

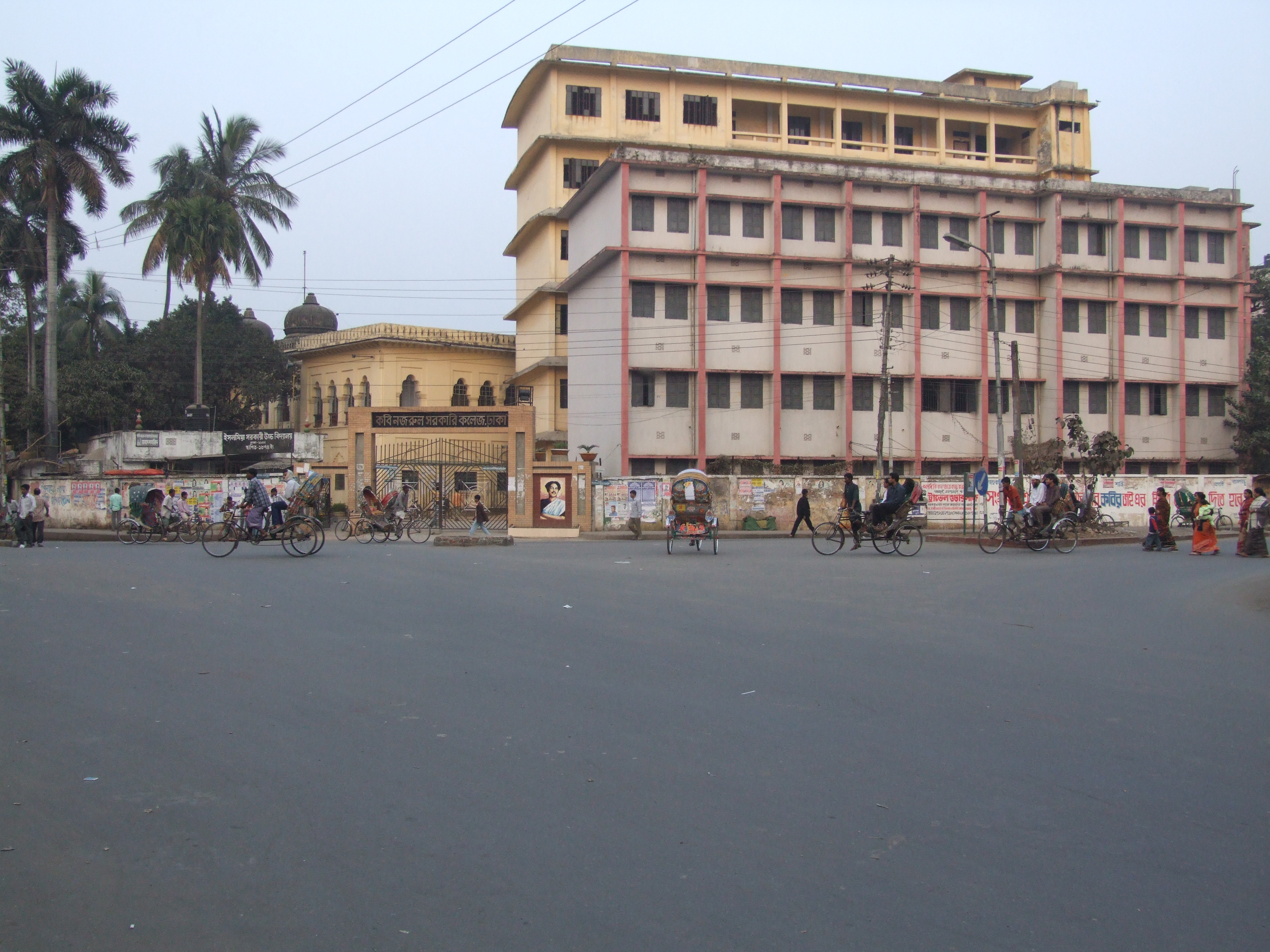
View from Bahadurshah Park

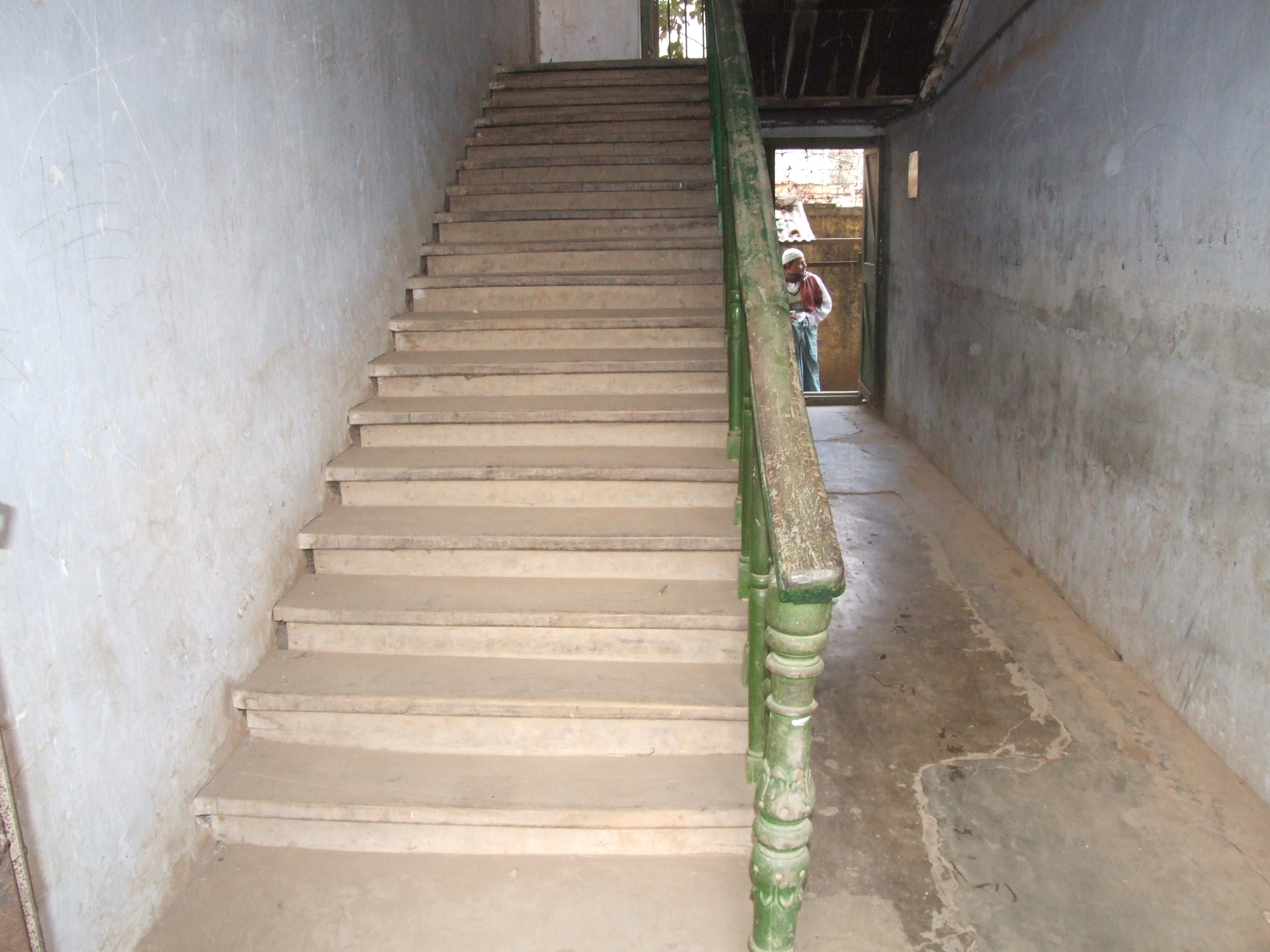
Wooden staircase

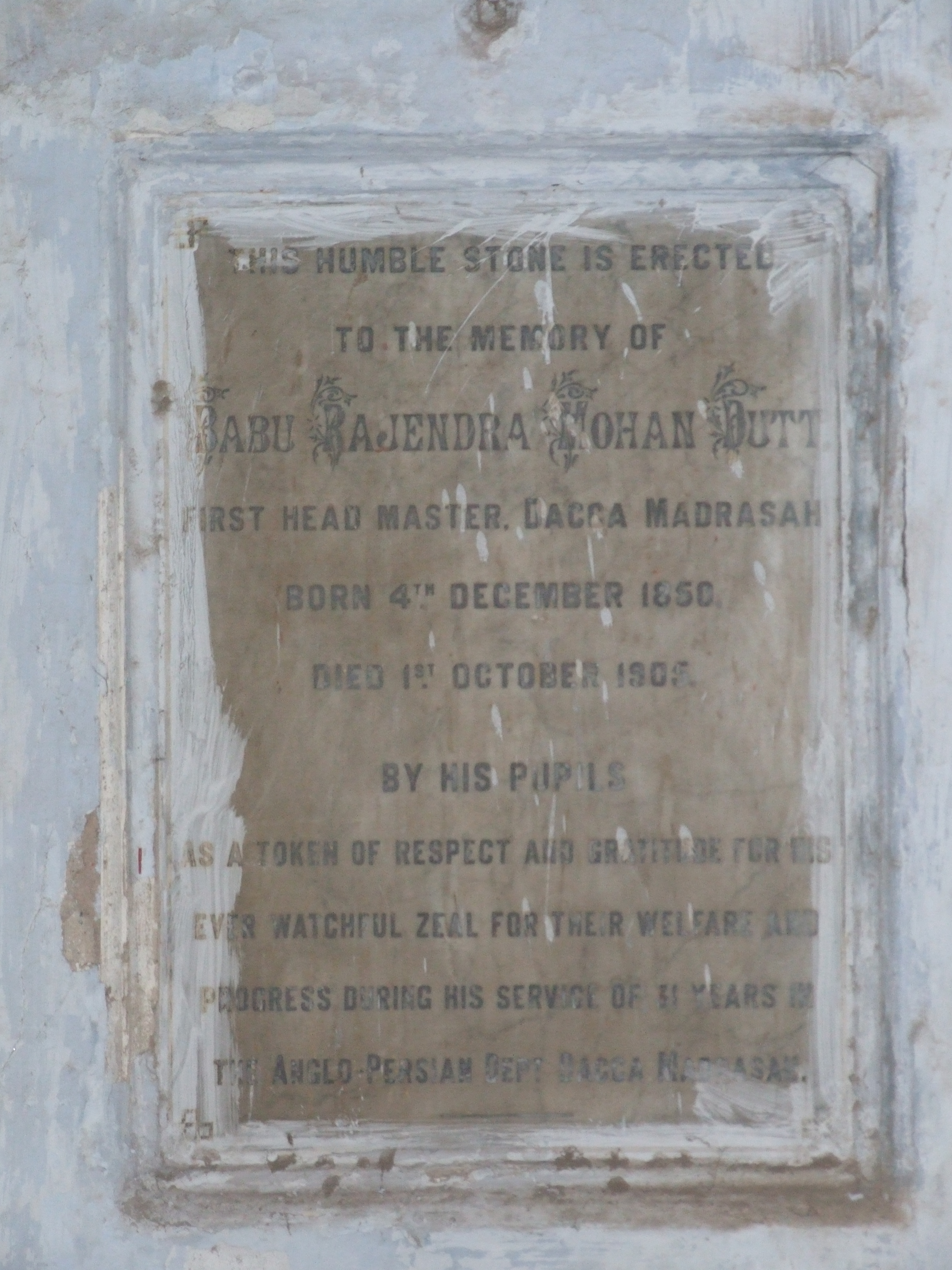
Nameplate

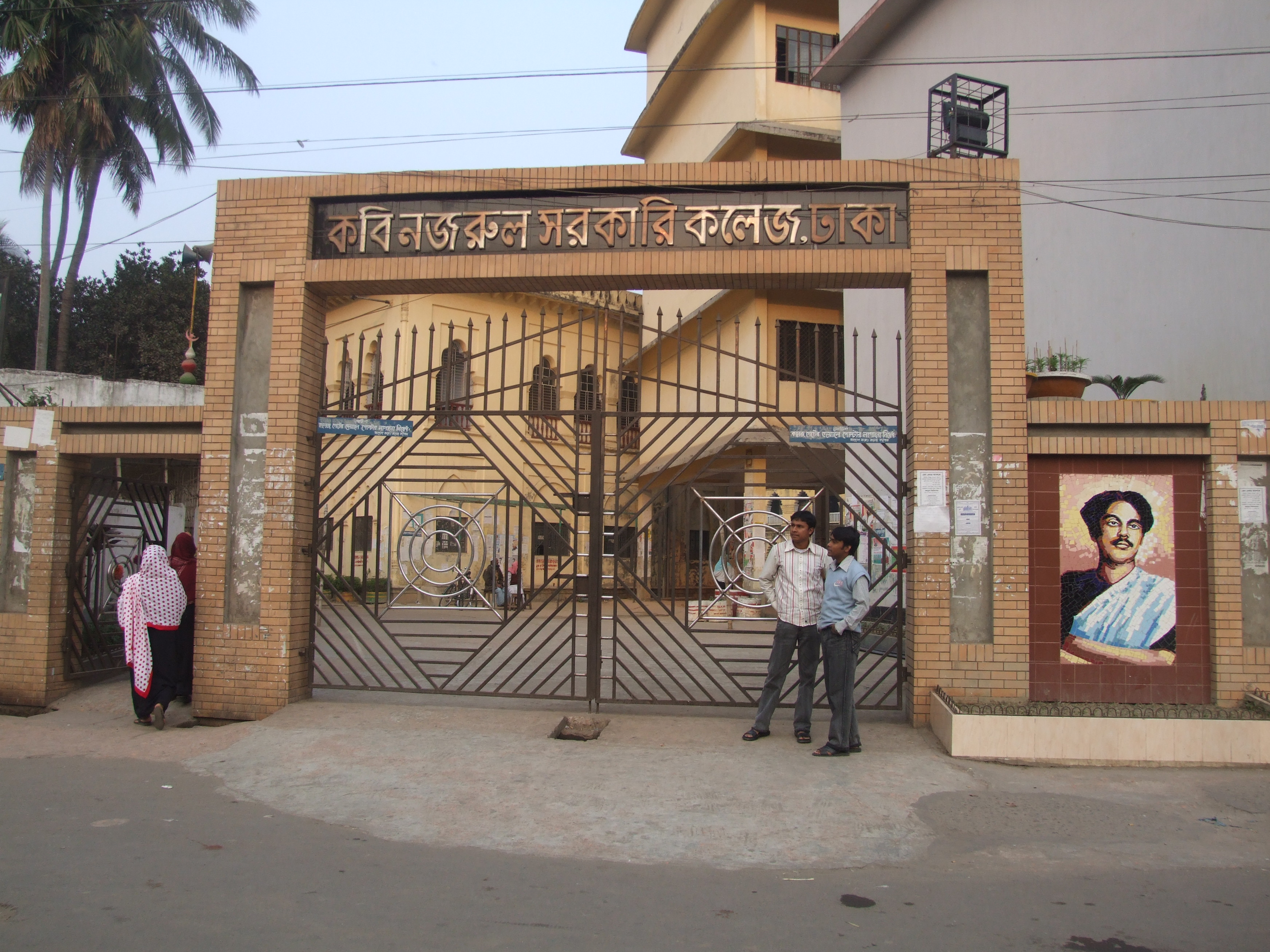
Entrance gate

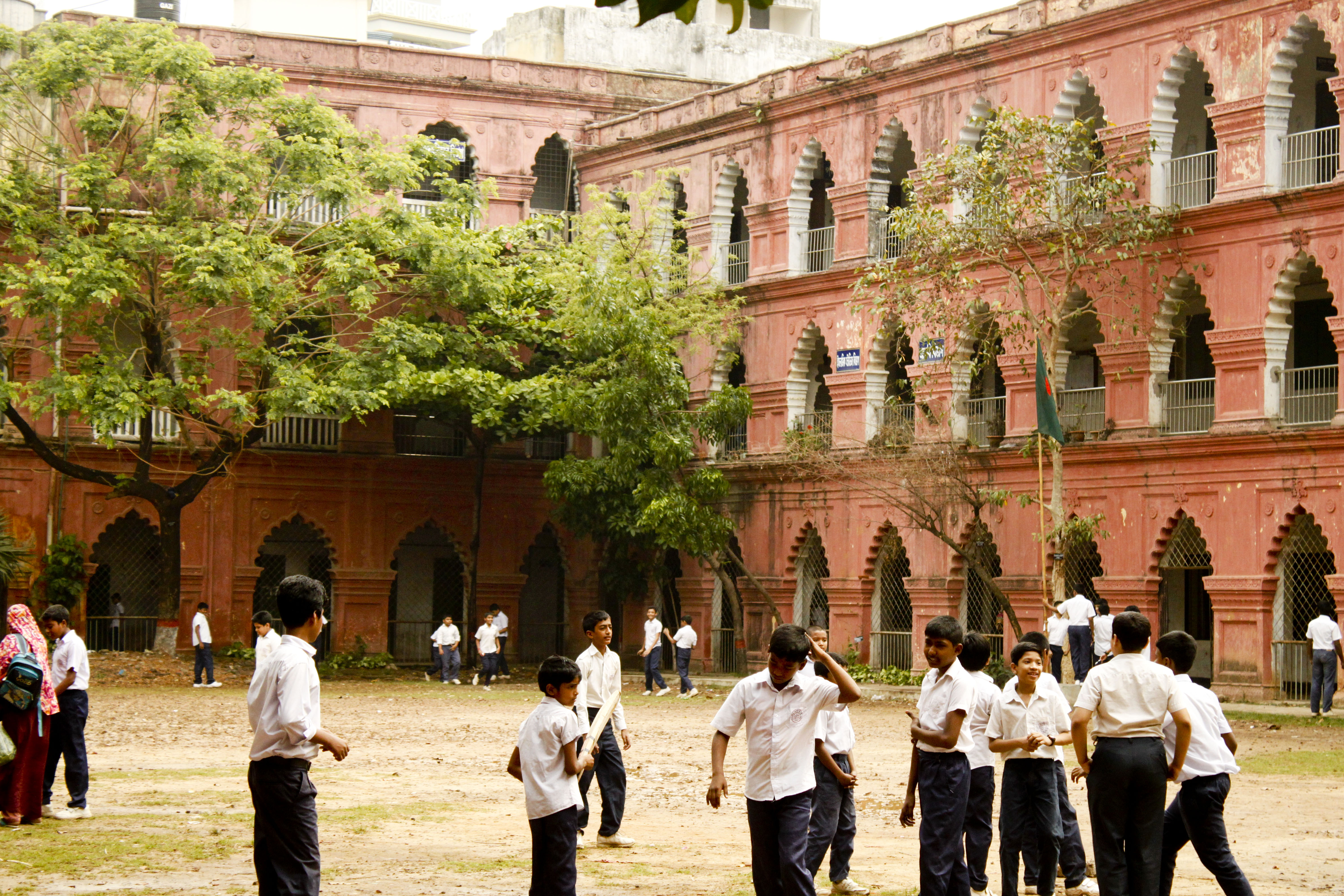
Campus

== Notable alumni ==
- Salma Khatun, Bangladesh's first female locomotive driver
- Sheikh Shaheb Ali, international football coach and player
