= List of villages in Bangladesh =

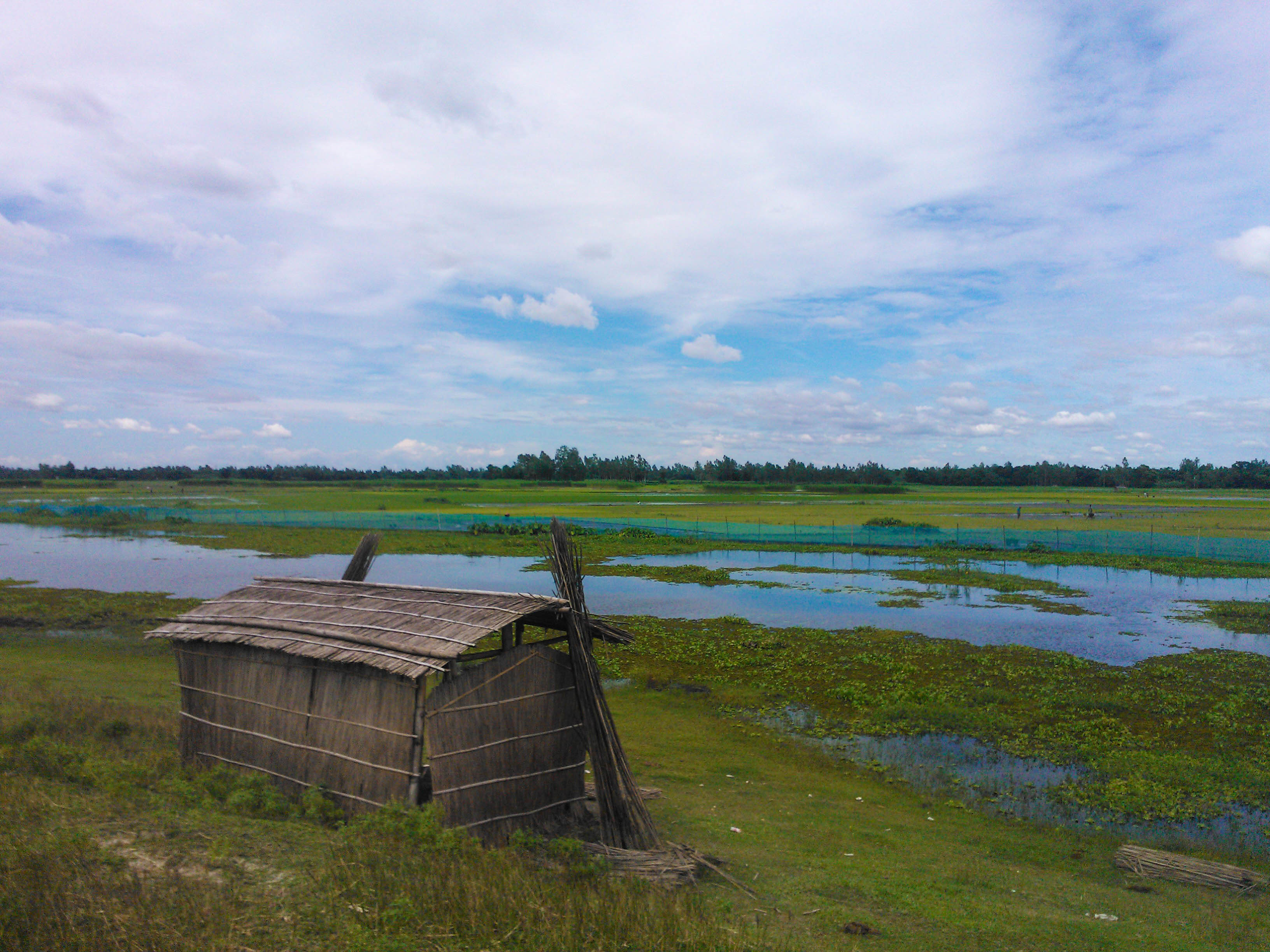
Countryside view of Bangladesh. This photo is taken from Jamalpur District.

This is a list of villages in Bangladesh. A village is a clustered human settlement or community, larger than a hamlet but smaller than a town, with a population ranging from a few hundred to a few thousand. Some villages in Bangladesh may be covered in thickets of trees, including bamboo, coconut, date palm, betel nut, mango and jackfruit. However, "only a small portion of the country’s land surface is covered with forests".

== A ==
- Abhaypara
- Achra
- Alokdia
- Aburkandi
- Achalchhila
- Adabaria, Barguna
- Adabaria, Patuakhali
- Adakhola
- Adarsha Andulia
- Adhara
- Adhuna
- Adoar
- Adra Ramchandrapur
- Afalkati
- Agharbari
- Ahammadkati
- Ahammadpur
- Aihar
- Aingiri
- Ainpur
- Aithadi
- Aitpara
- Ajagara
- Ajalia
- Akania
- Akania Nasirpur
- Akharpara
- Akiara
- Algi Mukundi
- Aliara
- Alumura
- Amanullapur
- Ambagan
- American Camp
- Aminpur
- Amiyapur
- Amlaki
- Amragachhia Hogalpati
- Amua
- Amuakandi
- Amujan
- Anailkota
- Anakhanda
- Anandakati
- Andar Char
- Andirpar
- Andua
- Angaria, Jhalokati
- Angaria, Patuakhali
- Angura Muhammadpur
- Ankutia
- Anurag
- Anwarpur
- Aorabania
- Araibeki
- Araidron
- Arpangasia
- Aruli
- Asali Santoshpur
- Asatkuari
- Asharkota
- Ashrafpur
- Ashtodona
- Asikathi
- Āsoār
- Asokati
- Asrafpur
- Aswinpur
- At Hazar
- Atakara
- Atakati
- Atarkhali
- Athara Gachhia
- Atipara
- Atiswar
- Auliapur
- Ausia
- Ayla Patakata
- Ayma
- Aynatali

Top of page

== B ==
- Babarkhana
- Bacha Shah Nagar
- Bachaia
- Bachhpar
- Badalpara
- Badanpur
- Badepurura
- Badiulla
- Badiyazzamapur
- Baduri
- Badurtala
- Baga, Bhola
- Baga, Patuakhali
- Bagdha
- Bagdia
- Baghabari
- Baghadi
- Baghar
- Baghia
- Baghmara
- Baghopara
- Bagiser Par
- Bagua Anantapur
- Bagura
- Bahadurpur, Bangladesh
- Bahalgachhia
- Bahari
- Baharia
- Baharkati
- Baher Khalisaduli
- Baherakhola
- Bahir Char Kshudrakati
- Bahirghat
- Baiara
- Baichatali
- Baichhara
- Baiddyamari
- Baidyanathpur
- Bairagia
- Bajetula
- Bakai
- Bakal
- Bakhaia
- Bakharpara
- Bakharpur
- Bakila
- Bakra
- Baksi Char
- Balaibania
- Balaikati
- Balairkandi
- Balakhal
- Baldia
- Baliakandi
- Baliarpur
- Baliatali
- Balichatia
- Balsid
- Balur Char
- Baluthupa
- Baman Barara
- Bamanikati
- Bamankati
- Bamrail
- Banamalikati
- Bangila
- Baniacho
- Baniakandi
- Baniasuri
- Bankati
- Bansbaria
- Bansgari
- Bansgari
- Baorkhola
- Bapta
- Bara Ani
- Bara Baduria
- Bara Baliatali
- Bara Basail
- Bara Bighai
- Bara Char Khajurtala
- Bara Char Lamchhi Pata
- Bara Char Samaia
- Bara Chaulakati
- Bara Doani
- Bara Gaurichanna
- Bara Hamidpur
- Bara Hamidpur
- Bara Jalia
- Bara Kanthalia
- Bara Kasba
- Bara Machhua
- Bara Madhab Rayer Char
- Bara Manika
- Bara Nachnapara
- Bara Paika
- Bara Pata
- Bara Patar Char
- Bara Puiautha
- Bara Saula
- Baradal
- Baragharia
- Barahanuddin
- Barahazar
- Barahipur
- Baraidaha
- Barakotha
- Barapaika
- Bariali
- Baribathan
- Barpara, Bandarban
- Barta
- Barthi
- Basabari
- Basantapur
- Basudeb Chap
- Basudebpara
- Basupatti
- Batajor
- Batamara
- Bathua
- Baulasar
- Bausia
- Bayelakhal
- Bazitkhan
- Bebaz
- Begungram
- Bejahar
- Bejra
- Belgachhi
- Beluhar
- Betagi Sinhakhali
- Betbunia, Khulna
- Betgarbha
- Betra
- Beukhir
- Bezgati
- Bhadeshwar
- Bhadun
- Bhandarikati
- Bhangar Mona
- Bharikati
- Bharpasa
- Bharsakati
- Bhaterchar
- Bhaudhar
- Bhazon Kara
- Bhikampur
- Bhimerpar
- Bhimruli
- Bhitabaria
- Bhojmahal
- Bhottopara
- Bhumsara
- Bhurghata
- Bhuta Lakshmipur
- Bhutardia
- Bhutua
- Biara
- Bibi Chini
- Bihangal
- Biharipur
- Bilgabbari
- Billabari
- Billagram
- Bisainkhan
- Bisarad
- Bisarikati Charkhanda
- Bisarkandi
- Boali Sakhipur
- Boalia, Barisal
- Boalia, Gopalgonj
- Bonpara
- Borta Para
- Brahmandia
- Braja Mohan
- Budhar
- Budhrail
- Bukabania
- Burir Char

Top of page

== C ==
- Chakman
- Chanchra
- Chand Trisira
- Chandi
- Chandkati
- Chandpasa Kismat
- Changaria
- Chaora
- Chapachupa
- Char Abdani
- Char Aicha
- Char Algi
- Char Amtali
- Char Annadaprasad
- Char Bahadurpur
- Char Balarampur
- Char Bara Lamchhi Dhali
- Char Bausia
- Char Bausiar Ghordaur
- Char Bhuai
- Char Bhuta
- Char Chandra Prasad
- Char Chithalia
- Char Dahali
- Char Decree
- Char Dhaleswar
- Char Doani Lathimara
- Char Dumurtala
- Char Durgapur
- Char Gachhua
- Char Gadhatali
- Char Haria
- Char Hesamaddi
- Char Hijla
- Char Hogalpatai
- Char Hogla
- Char Ilsa
- Char Jahapur
- Char Kalekhan
- Char Kapalbera
- Char Keutia
- Char Khagkata
- Char Khajuria
- Char Khanam
- Char Kolania
- Char Kusaria
- Char Lakshmipura
- Char Lata
- Char Madhab Rai
- Char Mahisha
- Char Malanga
- Char Manpura
- Char Memania
- Char Monai
- Char Nehalganj
- Char Padma
- Char Pakshya
- Char Pattania
- Char Payla
- Char Rangasri
- Char Sahebpur
- Char Sangar
- Char Santoshpur
- Char Satikhola
- Char Silinda
- Char Sonapur
- Char Sonarpur
- Char Udaypur
- Char Ulanghuni
- Charamaddi
- Charbaria Lamchari
- Charbaria
- Charigaon
- Charkhali
- Charkowna
- Charshahi
- Chata Araji
- Chatra
- Chaukati
- Chaulahar
- Chaulakati
- Chauliapatty
- Chengatia
- Chhagaldi
- Chhailabania
- Chhanbaria
- Chhankhola
- Chhaygram
- Chhopkhali
- Chhota Basail
- Chhota Char Khajurtala
- Chhota Chaulakati
- Chhota Dumuria
- Chhota Hamidpur
- Chhota Kandapasa
- Chhota Kasba
- Chhota Lakshmipur
- Chhota Patar Char
- Chhota Puiautha
- Chhota Saula
- Chila Chhonauta
- Chinatola Bazaar
- Chirakhola
- Chotogolla
- Chowara
- Chowbari
- Chunakhali
- Chunar Char
- Chunati
- Crowpara

Top of page

== D ==
- Daihari
- Dakshin Pustigasa
- Dakshin Telikhali
- Dal Char
- Daokati
- Darbeser Kandi
- Dari Char Gazipur
- Dari Char Khajuria
- Dariabad
- Dasherjangal
- Daspatti
- Dattasar
- Datterabad
- Dauatala
- Daudkhali
- Daulatpur, Manikganj
- Deapara
- Deopara
- Dehergati
- Deotala
- Des Bhuai
- Derpara
- Deulbari Dobra
- Dhakirgaon
- Dhakurkati
- Dhalua
- Dhamsar
- Dhamura
- Dhangora
- Dhanisafa
- Dhankundi
- Dhannapur
- Dhaoa
- Dhopakati
- Dhopapara
- Dhul Khola
- Dhumchar
- Dhumdumia
- Dhupkhali
- Dhuriail
- Diapara
- Diasur
- Diatali
- Dighia
- Dingar Hat
- Dohazari
- Donarkandi
- Dudhal
- Dulalpur
- Durgapur
- Durvazury
- Dwip Char

Top of page

== E ==
- East Jorkhali
- East Pasuribania
- Egarosindur

Top of page

== F ==
- Fultali
- Fardabad
- Fasiatala

Top of page

== G ==
- Garaia
- Garangal Rajpasa
- Gariabania
- Gakulnagar
- Gazipur, Barguna
- Ghighara
- Ghorashal
- Ghorua
- Ghosher Tikikata
- Gilatala
- Gimadanga
- Goalbari
- Gojkhali
- Gokarna
- Golartek
- Golbunia
- Golman
- Gomostapur
- Gopalpur
- Gopinathkati
- Gopinathpur
- Gorfotu
- Gowpara
- Guatan
- Guli
- Gulisakhali
- Gupta Brindaban

Top of page

== H ==
- Haidarabad
- Haldia
- Harbang
- Haribhanga
- Haridaspur
- Haridrabaria
- Hat Mokamia
- Haydor Pur
- Hemayetpur
- Himanandakati
- Hogalpati
- Hogla

Top of page

== I ==
- Ikri
- Ishwaripur
- Islampur
- Itna

Top of page

== J ==
- Jagair-At
- Jahedpur
- Jalabari
- Jaminpur
- Jammura
- Jamunia
- Jaykul
- Jethagram
- Jhigli
- Jilbania
- Jnanpara
- Joy Narayanpur
- Jugirkanda
- Jurvarongpara

Top of page

== K ==
- Kachikata
- Kafurkati
- Kakchira
- Kalaran Chandipur
- Kalikabari
- Kalipur
- Kalmegha
- Kalyanpur
- Kamarkati
- Kanaipur
- Kanchabalia
- Kansa
- Kantha Chora
- Kanudaskati
- Karai Tala
- Karpara
- Karpurkati
- Karuna
- Kathaltali
- Katnarpara
- Kayempur
- Kawkhali
- Kazirabad
- Keorabunia
- Kesarta
- Kewabania
- Khaduly
- Khadimpur
- Khanjanpur
- Khilpara
- Kotkandi
- Krisnapur
- Kukua
- Kumar Barilya
- Kumrakhali

Top of page

== L ==
- Lainkalangpara
- Langalbandh
- Latifpur
- Lebubania
- Lohagara, Chittagong

Top of page

== M ==
- Machimpur
- Matubhuiyan
- Magura, Pirojpur
- Magurchara Punji
- Mahajanpara
- Malikanda
- Masaba
- Matibhanga
- Middle Basura
- Middle Courtgaon
- Mirerkhil, Bhujpur union
- Mirzaganj, Patuakhali
- Mirzapur, Ishwarganj, Mymensingh
- Mithakhali
- Muninag
- Munshinagla
- Musurikati

Top of page

== N ==
- Nadmula
- Naikati
- Nalbania
- Naldanga
- Nali Chak
- Naltona
- Namazpur
- Naodhar
- Napitkhali
- Narerkati
- Narikelbaria
- Nazir Hat
- Niamati
- Nidhanpur
- Nij Bamna
- Nilati
- Nilakkhi
- Nizamia Ghopkhali
- Nizbolail
- Noagaon, Sarail
- Noapara
- North Halta
- Nowlamary
- Nazirpur

Top of page

== O ==
- Oskhali

Top of page

== P ==
- Paiyapathar
- Pakmahar
- Palash Kandy
- Panch Para
- Panchuria
- Patakata
- Pathorghata
- Payari
- Phalaibania
- Phuljhuri
- Pirgachha, Bogra
- Pomara
- Poshanda
- Pratapnagar
- Purquil
- Purush Pal
- Porabari

Top of page

== Q ==
- Quaderpur

Top of page

== R ==
- Rajapur
- Ramnagar, Bangladesh
- Rajdharpur
- Rambadak
- Ramu, Cox's Bazar
- Ranamati
- Rangalia
- Randhunibari
- Ranhat
- Ranipur
- Ratonpur
- Rejupara
- Roangchari
- Ronipara
- Rudaghara
- Rudrapur
- Rulkippara
- Ruma Bazar

Top of page

== S ==
- Sadarkati
- Sagornal
- Sahata
- Saildaha
- Sakarail
- Sakhagachhi
- Sakharia
- Samudaykati
- Sangumukh
- Sankardhabal
- Sankharikati
- Sapleja
- Sarankhola
- Sardarpara
- Satadaskati
- Shaharpara
- Shahebabad
- Shahbazpur, Brahmanbaria
- Shahjalal Uposhahar
- Singbahura
- Singhanagar
- Singpa
- Sit Mamudpur
- Sohagdal
- South Amragachhia
- South Gazipur
- South Halta
- South Kalikabari
- South Sarwakati
- South Shreepur
- Srikanthakati
- Srimantakati
- Sriramkati
- Sujaul
- Suktagar
- Sultanpur
- Sunampur
- Syedpur

Top of page

== T ==
- Taltoli
- Tanibhanga
- Tarabania
- Tarpurchandi
- Tarundia
- Tatinakhali
- Telihar
- Telikhali
- Than Sinhapur
- Titurkandi
- Tona
- Tushkhali

Top of page

== U ==
- Ujalhati
- Ujalpur
- Ulipukuri
- Umajuri
- Umarerbari
- Uttar Sonakhali

Top of page

== V ==
- Ververy

Top of page

== W ==
- West Chunakhali

Top of page

== Y ==
- Yasinpur

Top of page

== See also ==
- Index of Bangladesh-related articles
- List of cities and towns in Bangladesh
- Outline of Bangladesh
- Villages of Bangladesh
