= Deotala =

Coordinates: 23.6689°N 90.1155°E

Deotala (Bengali: দেওতলা) is a small village of Bangladesh. It's situated in the Nayanshree union of Nawabgonj upazila of Dhaka District.

== See also ==
- List of villages in Bangladesh
