= Tanibhanga =

Coordinates: 23.136°N 91.186°E

Tanibhanga is a village in Bangladesh with population of less than one thousand". "The village is under Jodda Union, Nangalkot Upazila in Comilla District".

== See also ==
- List of villages in Bangladesh
