= Bhutua =

Coordinates: 23°26′N 91°14′E

kamalpur Comilla Adarsha Sadar Upazila of Comilla District, Bangladesh.

== Demographics ==
According to the 2011 Bangladesh census, Bhutua had 125 households and a population of 674.

== Economy ==
About 65% of those employed are engaged in agriculture, with the remainder being in the service sector. The nearest market is in Chowara.

== Education ==
The village includes one of girls' High school,

== See also ==
- List of villages in Bangladesh
