= Dulalpur =

Village in Bangladesh

Coordinates: 23°37′40″N 91°04′55″E

Dulalpur is a village in Brahmanpara Upazila of Comilla District in the Chittagong Division of eastern Bangladesh.

== Mosques ==
Name of Masjid	Establishment
Dulalpur Bazar Masjid	1940
Dulalpur Bara Jame Masjid	1945
Dulalpur Uttar Para Jame Masjid	2002
Dulalpur Dakkhin Para Jame Masjid	1990
Dulalpur Pashcim Para Jame Masjid	1990
Dulalpur Baktar Bari Jame Masjid	2000
Dulalpur Mirkilla Para Jame Masjid	1970
