= Gojkhali =

- Location in Bangladesh
- Coordinates: 22°14′N 90°16′E
- Country: Bangladesh
- Division: Barisal Division
- District: Barguna District
- Time zone: UTC+6 (Bangladesh Time)

Gojkhali is a village in Barguna District in the Barisal Division of southern-central Bangladesh.
