= Shingbahura =

Coordinates: 23.0339°N 90.9822°E

Shingbahura, also spelled Shingbaura, is a village (postcode 3883) in Chatkhil Upazila, Noakhali District, Chittagong Division, Bangladesh.
