= Dari Char Khajuria =

Darichar Khajuria
- Village
- Location in Bangladesh
- Coordinates: 22°50′N 90°29′E
- Country: Bangladesh
- Division: Barisal Division
- District: Barisal District
- Time zone: UTC+6 (Bangladesh Time)

Darichar Khajuria is a village in Mehendiganj Upazila in Barisal District in the Barisal Division of southern-central Bangladesh.
