= Gazipur, Barguna =

- Location in Bangladesh
- Coordinates: 22°11′N 90°20′E
- Country: Bangladesh
- Division: Barisal Division
- District: Barguna District
- Time zone: UTC+6 (Bangladesh Time)

Gazipur, Barguna is a village in Barguna District in the Barisal Division of southern-central Bangladesh.
