= Barpara, Bandarban =

Empu para
- Location in Bangladesh
- Coordinates: 21°59′N 92°18′E
- Country: Bangladesh
- Division: Chittagong Division
- District: Bandarban District
- Time zone: UTC+6 (Bangladesh Time)

Empu para is a village in Bandarban District in the Chittagong Division of southeastern Bangladesh.
