= Chapachupa =

- Location in Bangladesh
- Coordinates: 22°56′13″N 90°10′27″E
- Country: Bangladesh
- Division: Barisal Division
- District: Barisal District
- Time zone: UTC+6 (Bangladesh Time)

Chapachupa is a village in Barisal District in the Barisal Division of southern-central Bangladesh.
