= Singpa =

- Location in Bangladesh
- Coordinates: 21°36′N 92°32′E
- Country: Bangladesh
- Division: Chittagong Division
- District: Bandarban District
- Time zone: UTC+6 (Bangladesh Time)

Singpa is a village in Bandarban District in the Chittagong Division of southeastern Bangladesh.
