= Jammura =

Coordinates: 23.3250°N 91.2845°E

Jammura is a village in Kalikapur Union in Chauddagram Upazila of Comilla District in the division of Chittagong, Bangladesh.

== Demography ==
According to the 2011 Bangladesh census, Jammura had 387 households and a population of 1,744. 12.0% of the population was under the age of 5. The literacy rate (age 7 and over) was 75.9%, compared to the national average of 51.8%.
