= Deapara =

Village in Jessore District, Bangladesh

Coordinates: 23.0651°N 89.3920°E

Deapara is a village that is located in Sreedharpur Union of Abhaynagar Upazila, Jessore District, Bangladesh.
