= Amujan =

সাকুড়া
- Location in Bangladesh
- Coordinates: 23°17′N 90°57′E
- Country: Bangladesh
- Division: Chittagong Division
- District: Chandpur District
- Time zone: UTC+6 (Bangladesh Time)

Amujan is a village in Chandpur District in the Chittagong Division of eastern Bangladesh.
