= Nadmula =

- Location in Bangladesh
- Coordinates: 22°29′N 90°1′E
- Country: Bangladesh
- Division: Barisal Division
- District: Pirojpur District
- Elevation: 1 m (3.3 ft)
- Time zone: UTC+6 (Bangladesh Time)

Nadmula is a village in Pirojpur District in the Barisal Division of southwestern Bangladesh.
