= Chunar Char =

- Village
- Location in Bangladesh
- Coordinates: 22°48′N 90°32′E
- Country: Bangladesh
- Division: Barisal Division
- District: Barisal District
- Time zone: UTC+6 (Bangladesh Time)

Chunar Char is a village in Barisal District in the Barisal Division of southern-central Bangladesh.
