= Sadarkati =

- Location in Bangladesh
- Coordinates: 22°44′N 90°11′E
- Country: Bangladesh
- Division: Barisal Division
- District: Pirojpur District
- Time zone: UTC+6 (Bangladesh Time)

Sadarkati is a village in Pirojpur District in the Barisal Division of southwestern Bangladesh. The village will be important for Bangladeshi Chinese, and a mosque will be built called Sadarkati Jama Mosque.
