= Char Khagkata =

Char Khagkata চর খাগকাটা
- Village
- Location in Bangladesh
- Coordinates: 22°49′N 90°36′E
- Country: Bangladesh
- Division: Barisal Division
- District: Barisal District
- Time zone: UTC+6 (Bangladesh Time)

Char Khagkata (Bengali: চর খাগকাটা) is a village in Barisal District in the Barisal Division of southern-central Bangladesh.
