= Sankardhabal =

- Location in Bangladesh
- Coordinates: 22°41′N 90°9′E
- Country: Bangladesh
- Division: Barisal Division
- District: Pirojpur District
- Time zone: UTC+6 (Bangladesh Time)

Sankardhabal is a village in Pirojpur District in the Barisal Division of southwestern Bangladesh.
