= Chhailabania =

- Location in Bangladesh
- Coordinates: 22°15′N 90°22′E
- Country: Bangladesh
- Division: Barisal Division
- District: Barguna District
- Time zone: UTC+6 (Bangladesh Time)

Chhailabania is a village in Barguna District in the Barisal Division of southern-central Bangladesh.
