= Beluhar =

Beluhar বেলুহার
- Village
- Location in Bangladesh
- Coordinates: 22°56′N 90°11′E
- Country: Bangladesh
- Division: Barisal Division
- District: Barisal District
- Upazila: Agailjhara Upazila

Area
  - Total: 1.45 km^{2} (0.56 sq mi)

Population (2022)
  - Total: 2,021
  - Density: 1,390/km^{2} (3,610/sq mi)
- Time zone: UTC+6 (Bangladesh Time)

Beluhar is a village in Agailjhara Upazila of Barisal District in the Barisal Division of southern-central Bangladesh.

According to the 2022 Census of Bangladesh, Beluhar had 472 households and a population of 2,021. It has a total area of 1.45 km^{2} (0.56 sq mi).
