= Char Hijla =

Char Hijla চর হিজলা
- Location in Bangladesh
- Coordinates: 22°55′N 90°33′E
- Country: Bangladesh
- Division: Barisal Division
- District: Barisal District
- Time zone: UTC+6 (Bangladesh Time)

Char Hijla (Bengali: চর হিজলা) is a village in Barisal District in the Barisal Division of southern-central Bangladesh.
