= Bagdia =

Bagdia বাগদিয়া
- Village
- Location in Bangladesh
- Coordinates: 22°31′N 90°24′E
- Country: Bangladesh
- Division: Barisal Division
- District: Barisal District
- Upazila: Bakerganj Upazila

Population (2022)
  - Total: 5,583
- Time zone: UTC+6 (Bangladesh Time)

Bagdia is a village in Bakerganj Upazila of Barisal District in the Barisal Division of southern-central Bangladesh.

According to the 2022 Census of Bangladesh, Bagdia had 1,419 households and a population of 5,583.
