= South Amragachhia =

- Location in Bangladesh
- Coordinates: 22°24′N 90°13′E
- Country: Bangladesh
- Division: Barisal Division
- District: Barguna District
- Time zone: UTC+6 (Bangladesh Time)

South Amragachhia is a village in Barguna District in the Barisal Division of southern-central Bangladesh.
