= Jnanpara =

Village in Barisal Division, Bangladesh

- Location in Bangladesh
- Coordinates: 22°10′N 90°1′E
- Country: Bangladesh
- Division: Barisal Division
- District: Barguna District
- Time zone: UTC+6 (Bangladesh Time)

Jnanpara is a village in Barguna District in the Barisal Division of southern-central Bangladesh.
