= Machimpur =

Village under ward 23 of Sylhet, Bangladesh

Coordinates: 24.888°N 91.880°E

Machimpur, also spelt Masimpur is a village under Ward 23 of Sylhet, Bangladesh. According to the 2011 Bangladesh census, the population of the village was 6,829. The village was noted in the 20th century for Manipuri dance after it was visited by Nobel laureate Rabindranath Tagore.
