= Bakra =

- Location in Bangladesh
- Coordinates: 23°17′9″N 90°43′52″E
- Country: Bangladesh
- Division: Chittagong Division
- District: Chandpur District
- Time zone: UTC+6 (Bangladesh Time)

Bakra is a village in Chandpur District in the Chittagong Division of eastern Bangladesh.
