= Bara Baliatali =

- Location in Bangladesh
- Coordinates: 22°54′N 90°13′E
- Country: Bangladesh
- Division: Barisal Division
- District: Patuakhali District
- Time zone: UTC+6 (Bangladesh Time)

Bara Baliatali is a village in Patuakhali District in the Barisal Division of southern-central Bangladesh.
