= Ruma Bazar =

- Location in Bangladesh
- Coordinates: 22°02′57.30″N 92°24′31.80″E
- Country: Bangladesh
- Division: Chittagong Division
- District: Bandarban District
- Time zone: UTC+6 (Bangladesh Time)

Ruma Bazar is a village in Bandarban District in the Chittagong Division of southeastern Bangladesh.

== Gallery ==
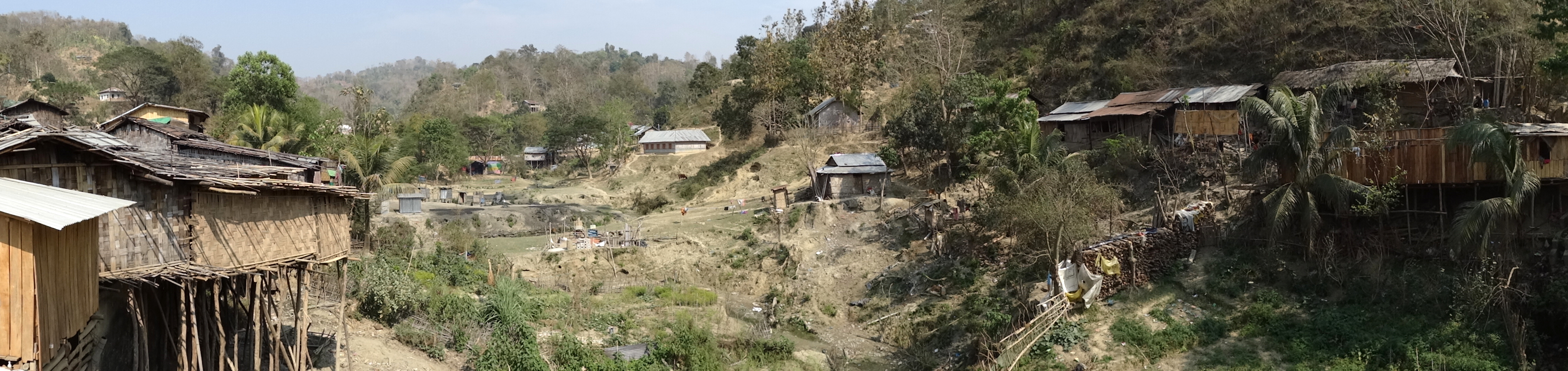
