= Deopara =

- Village
- Location in Bangladesh
- Coordinates: 22°55′N 90°15′E
- Country: Bangladesh
- Division: Dhaka Division
- District: Tangail District
- Time zone: UTC+6 (Bangladesh Time)

Deopara is a village in Tangail District in the Dhaka Division of southern-central Bangladesh.

Deopara is a hill locked Union Parishad under Ghatail Upa-Zilla of Tangail District under Dhaka Division. Deopara is surrounded by nearby villages like Taltala, Kalikapur, Sholakipara, Sharashak and Goariya. Deopara-Taltala-Kalikapur is renowned primarily for its natural resources especially woods. Famous teak timbers are still found in the locality. The local zigzag roads within the deep jungle will definitely baffle anyone taking the roads. There is also some tribal people in the village Taltala, Kalikapur and Chaiterbaid known as Mandai. People from Deopara-Taltala have been able to contribute to the Country in various aspects.
