= Adra Ramchandrapur =

Adra Ramchandrapur ( আদ্রা ) আদ্রা
- Location in Bangladesh
- Coordinates: 23°18′N 90°59′E
- Country: Bangladesh
- Division: Chittagong Division
- District: Comilla District
- Time zone: UTC+6 (Bangladesh Time)
- Postal code: 3561

Adra Ramchandrapur is a village in Comilla District in the Chittagong Division of eastern Bangladesh.
