= Quaderpur =

- Village
- Location in Bangladesh
- Coordinates: 26°16′27″N 88°32′08″E
- Country: Bangladesh
- Division: Rangpur Division
- District: Panchagarh District
- Time zone: UTC+6 (Bangladesh Time)

Quaderpur is a village in Panchagarh District in the Rangpur Division of northern-western Bangladesh.
