= Char Aicha =

Char Aicha চর আইচা
- Village
- Location in Bangladesh
- Coordinates: 22°41′N 90°24′E
- Country: Bangladesh
- Division: Barisal Division
- District: Barisal District
- Upazila: Barisal Sadar Upazila

Population (2022)
  - Total: 6,405
- Time zone: UTC+6 (Bangladesh Time)

Char Aicha is a village in Barisal Sadar Upazila of Barisal District in the Barisal Division of southern-central Bangladesh.

== Demographics ==
According to the 2022 Census of Bangladesh, Char Aicha had 1,502 households and a population of 6,405.
