= Bakila =

- Location in Bangladesh
- Coordinates: 23°15′N 90°47′E
- Country: Bangladesh
- Division: Chittagong Division
- District: Chandpur District
- Time zone: UTC+6 (Bangladesh Time)

Bakila is a Bazaar in Hazigonj Thana, Chandpur District in the Chittagong Division of eastern Bangladesh. Many big cattle markets sit on Thursdays. This cattle market is a very old market. This market is contributing to the revenue of the government
