= Char Jahapur =

Jahapur চর জাহাপুর Char Jahapur
- Village
- Motto: we are as like a large family, we all are friendly, we all are cultured, educated
- Location in Bangladesh
- Coordinates: 22°55′N 90°20′E
- Country: Bangladesh
- Division: Barisal Division
- District: Barisal District
- Time zone: UTC+6 (Bangladesh Time)

Char Jahapur is a village in Barisal District in the Barisal Division of southern-central Bangladesh.
