= Ghorua =

Coordinates: 24.491°N 91.742°E

Gharua is a village located within the Sheola Union, Beanibazar Upazila, Sylhet District, Bangladesh. Its population is less than 500 people. Gharua has a government primary school.
