= Bisarikati Charkhanda =

- Location in Bangladesh
- Coordinates: 22°37′0″N 90°30′0″E
- Country: Bangladesh
- Division: Barisal Division
- District: Barisal District
- Elevation: 3.3 ft (1 m)
  - Density: 1,650/sq mi (636/km^{2})
- Time zone: UTC+6 (Bangladesh Time)

Bisarikati Charkhanda is a village in the Barisal District of the Barisal Division within Bangladesh.
