= Badalpara =

Badalpara বাদলপাড়া
- Village
- Location in Bangladesh
- Coordinates: 22°38′N 90°25′E
- Country: Bangladesh
- Division: Barisal Division
- District: Barisal District
- Upazila: Bakerganj Upazila

Population (2022)
  - Total: 5,505
- Time zone: UTC+6 (Bangladesh Time)

Badalpara (Bengali: বাদলপাড়া) is a village in Bakerganj Upazila of Barisal District in the Barisal Division of southern-central Bangladesh.

== Population ==
According to the 2022 Census of Bangladesh, Badalpara had 1,273 households and a population of 5,505.
