= Katnarpara =

Coordinates: 24°51′29″N 89°22′08″E

Katnarpara is one of the largest neighbourhood (para in Bengali) of Bogra in Bangladesh.

== Demographics ==
According to the 2011 Bangladesh census, the population of the area was 7,174.

== Region ==
Katnarpara is under ward no. 3 of Bogra municipal corporation. Sub-regions of this region are Shibbati, Kalitola, Ali-Sonar Lane, Cotton-Mill, Dottobari, Borogola, Namajgor, etc. It covers almost five square kilometers.

== Economy ==
Two factories make bread: Lucky bread factory and Shimu Bakery.

== Education ==
Coronation is a large school that has operated for 150 years. There is another high school. Three primary schools are in the area.

== Mosques and temples ==
Five mosques & three temples are located there. Two graveyards, Namajgor Gorosthan and Dottobari Smoshan and a funeral parlor are there.
