= Khanjanpur =

Coordinates: 25.101°N 89.005°E

Khanjapur or Khanjapur (Bengali: খাঞ্জাপুর, খান-জা-পুর) is a village situated at the periphery of Gournadi Upazila, Barishal District in the Barishal Division of Bangladesh.
