= Amragachhia Hogalpati =

- Location in Bangladesh
- Coordinates: 22°14′N 89°55′E
- Country: Bangladesh
- Division: Barisal Division
- District: Pirojpur District
- Time zone: UTC+6 (Bangladesh Time)

Amragachhia Hogalpati is a village in Pirojpur District in the Barisal Division of southwestern Bangladesh.
