= Diatali =

- Village
- Location in Bangladesh
- Coordinates: 22°32′N 90°23′E
- Country: Bangladesh
- Division: Barisal Division
- District: Barisal District
- Time zone: UTC+6 (Bangladesh Time)

Diatali is a village in Kalaskati Union of Bakerganj Upazila, Barisal District in the Barisal Division of southern-central Bangladesh.
