= Bara Pata =

- Location in Bangladesh
- Coordinates: 22°26′N 90°43′E
- Country: Bangladesh
- Division: Barisal Division
- District: Bhola District
- Time zone: UTC+6 (Bangladesh Time)

Bara Pata is a village in Bhola District in the Barisal Division of southern-central Bangladesh.
