= Dhupkhali =

Coordinates: 23.2535°N 89.3353°E

Dhupkhali is a village under Narikelbaria Union, Bagherpara Upazila, Jessore District in Bangladesh.

According to the 2011 Bangladesh census, Narail Sadar Upazila had 435 households and a population of 1,950. 88% of the employed population was engaged in agricultural work.

There is a primary school and one girls' madrasa in the village.
