= Kalmegha =

Village in Dhaka Division, Bangladesh

Coordinates: 24.2680°N 90.2705°E

Kalmegha is a village in Jadbpur Union, Sakhipur Upazila, Tangail District, Dhaka Division, Bangladesh.
