= Gilatala =

- Location in Bangladesh
- Coordinates: 22°46′N 89°59′E
- Country: Bangladesh
- Division: Barisal Division
- District: Pirojpur District
- Time zone: UTC+6 (Bangladesh Time)

গিলাতলা মাধ্যমিক বিদ্যালয় Gilatala is a village in Pirojpur District in the Barisal Division of southwestern Bangladesh.
