= Chhota Kandapasa =

Chhota Kandapasa ছোট কাঁদাপাশা
- Village
- Location in Bangladesh
- Coordinates: 22°56′N 90°18′E
- Country: Bangladesh
- Division: Barisal Division
- District: Barisal District
- Time zone: UTC+6 (Bangladesh Time)

Chhota Kandapasa is a village in Barisal District in the Barisal Division of southern-central Bangladesh.
