= Umajuri =

- Location in Bangladesh
- Coordinates: 22°44′N 89°55′E
- Country: Bangladesh
- Division: Barisal Division
- District: Pirojpur District
- Time zone: UTC+6 (Bangladesh Time)

Umajuri is a village in Bagerhat District in the Khulna Division of southwestern Bangladesh.
