= Malikanda =

Coordinates: 23°34′N 90°09′E

Malikanda is a village at Wazirpur Upazila in Barisal District, Bangladesh, by the River Sandha. Malikanda has two parts: Dakkhin Malikanda and Uttar Malikanda (South Malikanda and North Malikanda).
