= Phalaibania =

Phalaibania ফালাইবানিয়া
- Location in Bangladesh
- Coordinates: 22°33′N 90°3′E
- Country: Bangladesh
- Division: Barisal Division
- District: Pirojpur District
- Time zone: UTC+6 (Bangladesh Time)

Phalaibania (Bengali: ফালাইবানিয়া) is a village in Pirojpur District in the Barisal Division of southwestern Bangladesh.
