= Bhurghata =

Bhurghata ভুরঘাটা
- Village
- Location in Bangladesh
- Coordinates: 22°04′N 90°12′E
- Country: Bangladesh
- Division: Barisal Division
- District: Barisal District
- Upazila: Gournadi Upazila

Area
  - Total: 0.71 km^{2} (0.27 sq mi)

Population (2022)
  - Total: 2,302
  - Density: 3,200/km^{2} (8,400/sq mi)
- Time zone: UTC+6 (Bangladesh Time)

Bhurghata is a village in Gournadi Upazila of Barisal District in the Barisal Division of southern-central Bangladesh.

According to the 2022 Census of Bangladesh, Bhurghata had 535 households and a population of 2,302. It has a total area of 0.71 km^{2} (0.27 sq mi).
