= Chand Trisira =

- Location in Bangladesh
- Coordinates: 22°57′N 90°5′E
- Country: Bangladesh
- Division: Barisal Division
- District: Barisal District
- Time zone: UTC+6 (Bangladesh Time)

Chand Trisira is a village in Barisal District in the Barisal Division of southern-central Bangladesh.
