= Charamaddi =

Charamaddi চরামদ্দি
- Village
- Location in Bangladesh
- Coordinates: 22°38′N 90°26′E
- Country: Bangladesh
- Division: Barisal Division
- District: Barisal District
- Upazila: Bakerganj Upazila

Area
  - Total: 10.98 km^{2} (4.24 sq mi)

Population (2022)
  - Total: 9,924
  - Density: 903.8/km^{2} (2,341/sq mi)
- Time zone: UTC+6 (Bangladesh Time)

Charamaddi is a village in Bakerganj Upazila of Barisal District in the Barisal Division of southern-central Bangladesh.

According to the 2022 Census of Bangladesh, Charamaddi had 2,429 households and a population of 9,924. It has a total area of 10.98 km^{2} (4.24 sq mi).
