= Bara Bighai =

Bara Bighai বড় বিঘাই
- Location in Bangladesh
- Coordinates: 22°18′N 90°16′E
- Country: Bangladesh
- Division: Barisal Division
- District: Patuakhali District
- Time zone: UTC+6 (Bangladesh Time)

Bara Bighai (Bengali: বড় বিঘাই, Bengali pronunciation: [bɔɽo biɡʱai]) is a village in Patuakhali District in the Barisal Division of southern-central Bangladesh.
