= Bara Paika =

Bara Paika বারপাইকা
- Village
- Location in Bangladesh
- Coordinates: 22°56′N 90°9′E
- Country: Bangladesh
- Division: Barisal Division
- District: Barisal District
- Upazila: Agailjhara Upazila

Area
  - Total: 7.85 km^{2} (3.03 sq mi)

Population (2022)
  - Total: 7,160
  - Density: 912/km^{2} (2,360/sq mi)
- Time zone: UTC+6 (Bangladesh Time)

Bara Paika is a village in Agailjhara Upazila of Barisal District in the Barisal Division of southern-central Bangladesh.

According to the 2022 Census of Bangladesh, Bara Paika had 1,804 households and a population of 7,160. It has a total area of 7.85 km^{2} (3.03 sq mi).
