= Yasinpur =

- Railway Station
- Location in Bangladesh
- Coordinates: 24°21′45″N 88°57′49″E
- Country: Bangladesh
- Division: Rajshahi Division
- District: Natore District
- Time zone: UTC+6 (Bangladesh Time)

Yasinpur Railway Station

Yasinpur is a Railway Station at south-end of Natore Sadar Upazila and adjacent to Bagatipara Upazila in Natore District in the Rajshahi Division of north-west Bangladesh. This Station has been named as per the name of Alhaj Yasin Ali Pramanik.

The social-worker Alhaj Yasin Ali Pramanik, one of the younger brothers of Eminent Noble Physician of the Locality Dr. Waj Box Pramanik, played vital role and sacrificed his own wealth in establishing this Station.
