= Niamati =

Niamati নিয়ামতি
- Village
- Location in Bangladesh
- Coordinates: 22°29′N 90°13′E
- Country: Bangladesh
- Division: Barisal Division
- District: Barisal District
- Upazila: Bakerganj Upazila

Area
  - Total: 5.83 km^{2} (2.25 sq mi)

Population (2022)
  - Total: 8,555
  - Density: 1,470/km^{2} (3,800/sq mi)
- Time zone: UTC+6 (Bangladesh Time)

Niamati is a village in Bakerganj Upazila of Barisal District in the Barisal Division of southern-central Bangladesh.

According to the 2022 Census of Bangladesh, Niamati had 2,304 households and a population of 8,555. It has a total area of 5.83 km^{2} (2.25 sq mi).
