= Char Gachhua =

Char Gachhua চর গাছুয়া
- Location in Bangladesh
- Coordinates: 22°58′N 90°26′E
- Country: Bangladesh
- Division: Barisal Division
- District: Barisal District
- Time zone: UTC+6 (Bangladesh Time)

Char Gachhua (Bengali: চর গাছুয়া) is a village in Barisal District in the Barisal Division of southern-central Bangladesh.
