= Bacha Shah Nagar =

Bacha Shah Nagar বাচা শাহ নগর
- Location in Bangladesh
- Coordinates: 22.449°N 92.018°E
- Country: Bangladesh
- Division: Chittagong Division
- District: Chittagong District
- Time zone: UTC+6 (BST)
- Postal code: 4360

Bacha Shah Nagar (Bengali: বাচা শাহ নগর) is a village of Rangunia Upazila at Chittagong District in the Division of Chittagong, Bangladesh.
