= Barahipur =

- Location in Bangladesh
- Coordinates: 22°45′N 90°42′E
- Country: Bangladesh
- Division: Barisal Division
- District: Bhola District
- Time zone: UTC+6 (Bangladesh Time)

Barahipur is a village in Bhola District in the Barisal Division of southern-central Bangladesh.
