= Bachhpar =

- Location in Bangladesh
- Coordinates: 23°12′N 90°48′E
- Country: Bangladesh
- Division: Chittagong Division
- District: Chandpur District

Population (As of 2009)
  - Total: 241,799
- Time zone: UTC+6 (Bangladesh Time)

Bachhpar is a village in Chandpur District in the Chittagong Division of eastern Bangladesh.
