= Khadimpur =

Khadimpur is situated in the southern part of Balurghat, Dakshin Dinajpur (District), West Bengal, India. It is within Balurghat Municipality, Ward No. 5. Sandha cinema hall and local market is also situated here. Major schools in this area are Khadimpur Girls' School and Khadimpur Boys School.
