= Dhangora =

Coordinates: 24.3494°N 90.0646°E

Dhangora is a village of Kalihati Upazila of Tangail District in the Division of Dhaka Division, Bangladesh. It stands on the Bangshi River.

The people of this village are engaged in agriculture, business and other income generating activities. A large number of people of this village are working abroad. There are also some high educated persons in the village. There is electricity, but poor road communication.
