= Asokati =

- Location in Bangladesh
- Coordinates: 22°57′36″N 90°13′55″E
- Country: Bangladesh
- Division: Barisal Division
- District: Barisal District
- Time zone: UTC+6 (Bangladesh Time)

Asokati is a village in Gournadi Upazila of Barisal District in the Barisal Division of southern-central Bangladesh.
