= Dehergati =

Dehergati দেহেরগতি
- Village
- Location in Bangladesh
- Coordinates: 22°47′N 90°17′E
- Country: Bangladesh
- Division: Barisal Division
- District: Barisal District
- Upazila: Babuganj Upazila

Area
  - Total: 6.56 km^{2} (2.53 sq mi)

Population (2022)
  - Total: 4,572
  - Density: 697/km^{2} (1,810/sq mi)
- Time zone: UTC+6 (Bangladesh Time)

Dehergati is a village in Babuganj Upazila of Barisal District in the Barisal Division of southern-central Bangladesh.

According to the 2022 Census of Bangladesh, Dehergati had 1,112 households and a population of 4,572. It has a total area of 6.56 km^{2} (2.53 sq mi).
