= Bhazon Kara =

Coordinates: 23.1000°N 91.3394°E

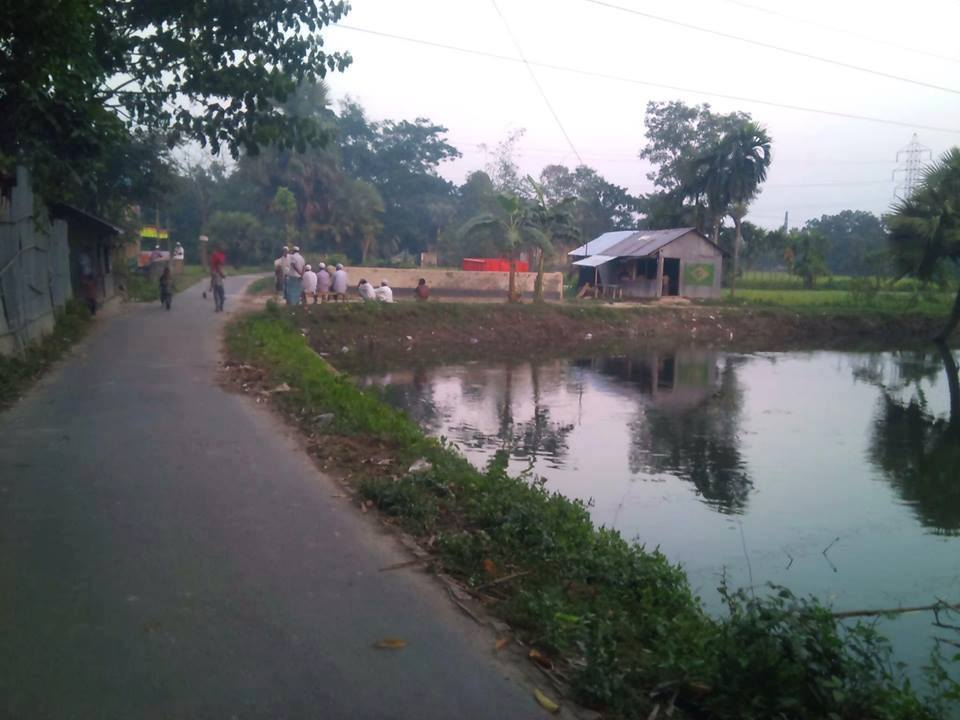
A village of Bangladesh. Located on Comilla District under Chauddargram Upazila.

Bhazon Kara is a village in Alkara Union of Chauddagram Upazila, which is in the Comilla District of eastern Bangladesh.

Communication is pretty good due to beside of Dhaka-Chittagong highway. The village has a primary school, community clinics, including mosque, madrasas and tourist attractions.
