= At Hazar =

At Hazar আট হাজ়ার
- Location in Bangladesh
- Coordinates: 22°45′N 90°26′E
- Country: Bangladesh
- Division: Barisal Division
- District: Barisal District
- Time zone: UTC+6 (Bangladesh Time)

At Hazar (Bengali: আট হাজ়ার, Bengali pronunciation: [aʈ ɦazaɾ]) is a village in Barisal District in the Barisal Division of southern-central Bangladesh.
