= Dhalua =

Dhalua ঢলুয়া
- Location in Bangladesh
- Coordinates: 22°05′56″N 90°02′58″E
- Country: Bangladesh
- Division: Barisal Division
- District: Barguna District
- Time zone: UTC+6 (Bangladesh Time)

Dhalua is a village in Barguna District in the Barisal Division of southern-central Bangladesh.
