= Durgapur, Bangladesh =

Susang Durgapur, Netrokona Bangladesh
- Location in Bangladesh
- Coordinates: 22°39′N 89°59′E
- Country: Bangladesh
- Division: Barisal Division
- District: Pirojpur District
- Time zone: UTC+6 (Bangladesh Time)

Durgapur, Bangladesh is a village in Pirojpur District in the Barisal Division of southwestern Bangladesh.
