= Afalkati =

- Location in Bangladesh
- Coordinates: 22°29′N 90°26′E
- Country: Bangladesh
- Division: Barisal Division
- District: Barisal District
- Time zone: UTC+6 (Bangladesh Time)

Afalkati is a village in Bakerganj Upazila of Barisal District in the Barisal Division of southern-central Bangladesh.
