= Char Bausia =

- Location in Bangladesh
- Coordinates: 22°57′02″N 90°31′48″E
- Country: Bangladesh
- Division: Barisal Division
- District: Barisal District
- Time zone: UTC+6 (Bangladesh Time)

Char Bausia is a village in Barisal District in the Barisal Division of southern-central Bangladesh.
