= Char Keutia =

Char Keutia চর কেউটিয়া
- Village
- Location in Bangladesh
- Coordinates: 22°42′N 90°28′E
- Country: Bangladesh
- Division: Barisal Division
- District: Barisal District
- Time zone: UTC+6 (Bangladesh Time)

Char Keutia (Bengali: চর কেউটিয়া) is a village in Barisal District in the Barisal Division of southern-central Bangladesh.
