= Char Khajuria =

Char Khajuria চর খাজুরিয়া
- Village
- Location in Bangladesh
- Coordinates: 22°49′N 90°26′E
- Country: Bangladesh
- Division: Barisal Division
- District: Barisal District
- Time zone: UTC+6 (Bangladesh Time)

Char Khajuria (Bengali: চর খাজুরিয়া) is a village in Barisal District in the Barisal Division of southern-central Bangladesh.
