= Umarerbari =

Umarerpar
- Location in Bangladesh
- Coordinates: 22°49′N 90°3′E
- Country: Bangladesh
- Division: Barisal Division
- District: Barishal District
- Time zone: UTC+6 (Bangladesh Time)

Umarerpar is a village in Barishal District in the Barisal Division of southwestern Bangladesh.
