= Rejupara =

- Location in Bangladesh
- Coordinates: 21°15′N 92°12′E
- Country: Bangladesh
- Division: Chittagong Division
- District: Bandarban District
- Time zone: UTC+6 (Bangladesh Time)

Rejupara is a village in Bandarban District in the Chittagong Division of southeastern Bangladesh. It came to limelight when Myanmar border guards Nasaka attacked a Bangladesh Rifles (BDR) Border Out Post (BOP) in 1991 killing a BDR member. Nasaka justified its attack saying that insurgents were operating from that area. Tension between the border guards persisted for few months. There were also influx of Rohingya refugees to Bangladesh.
