= Namazpur =

Namazpur নামাজ়পুর
- Location in Bangladesh
- Coordinates: 22°33′N 89°58′E
- Country: Bangladesh
- Division: Barisal Division
- District: Pirojpur District
- Time zone: UTC+6 (Bangladesh Time)

Namazpur (Bengali: নামাজ়পুর) is a village in Pirojpur District in the Barisal Division of southwestern Bangladesh.
