= Bagdha =

Bagdha বাগধা
- Village
- Location in Bangladesh
- Coordinates: 22°56′N 90°6′E
- Country: Bangladesh
- Division: Barisal Division
- District: Barisal District
- Upazila: Agailjhara Upazila

Area
  - Total: 8.15 km^{2} (3.15 sq mi)

Population (2022)
  - Total: 10,015
  - Density: 1,230/km^{2} (3,180/sq mi)
- Time zone: UTC+6 (Bangladesh Time)

Bagdha is a village in Agailjhara Upazila of Barisal District in the Barisal Division of southern-central Bangladesh.

According to the 2022 Census of Bangladesh, Bagdha had 2,201 households and a population of 10,015. It has a total area of 8.15 km^{2} (3.15 sq mi).
