= South Sarwakati =

- Location in Bangladesh
- Coordinates: 22°45′N 90°11′E
- Country: Bangladesh
- Division: Barisal Division
- District: Pirojpur District
- Time zone: UTC+6 (Bangladesh Time)

South Sarwakati is a village in Pirojpur District in the Barisal Division of southwestern Bangladesh. It is located approximately 109 kilometers (68 miles) south of Bangladesh's capital, Dhaka.
