= Baorkhola =

Village in Bangladesh

Coordinates: 23.6177°N 90.6804°E

Dakshin Baorkhola is a village in Meghna Upazila in Comilla District, Bangladesh. It has one side flowing by a canal and other side by a straight road. There are two government primary schools and a private high school.
