= Titurkandi =

Titurkandi is a village in Tagarbanda Union, Alfadanga Upazila, Faridpur District, Bangladesh. There is one primary school, one madrasa, one community hospital, two mosques, four temples and one Union Office.
