= Āsoār =

Asoar
- Location in Bangladesh
- Coordinates: 23°49′N 90°13′E
- Country: Bangladesh
- Division: Barisal Division
- District: Barisal District
- Time zone: UTC+6 (Bangladesh Time)

Āsoār is a village in Banaripara Upazila, of Barisal District in the Barisal Division of southern-central Bangladesh.
