= Atakati =

- Location in Bangladesh
- Coordinates: 22°30′N 90°20′E
- Country: Bangladesh
- Division: Barisal Division
- District: Patuakhali District
- Time zone: UTC+6 (Bangladesh Time)

Atakati is a village in Patuakhali District in the Barisal Division of southern-central Bangladesh.
