= Mahajanpara =

- Location in Bangladesh
- Coordinates: 22°8′25″N 92°25′04″E
- Country: Bangladesh
- Division: Chittagong Division
- District: Bandarban District
- Time zone: UTC+6 (Bangladesh Time)

Mahajanpara is a village in the Bandarban District in the Chittagong Division of southeastern Bangladesh.
