= Syed Rahmatur Rob Irtiza Ahsan =

Bangladeshi politician (1935–2020)

Syed Rahmatur Rub Irtiza Ahsan
- সৈয়দ রহমাতুর রব ইরতিজ়া আহসান

Member of the Bangladesh Parliament for Barguna-2
- In office 1986–1988
- Preceded by: Akhtaruzzaman Alamgir
- Succeeded by: Nurul Islam Moni

Personal details
- Born: 7 May 1937 Bamna, Barguna, Bengal Presidency
- Died: 13 April 2020 (aged 84) Apollo Hospital Dhaka, Bangladesh
- Party: Jatiya Party (Ershad)
- Relatives: Syeda Sajeda Chowdhury; Syed Qamarul Ahsan

Syed Rahmatur Rub Irtiza Ahsan (Bengali: সৈয়দ রহমাতুর রব ইরতিজ়া আহসান, Bengali pronunciation: [ʃoi̯jod rɔɦmatuɾ rɔb iɾtiza aɦsan]) was a Bangladeshi politician and a former member of parliament for Barguna-2.

== Early life and family ==
Syed Rahmatur Rub Irtiza Ahsan was born on 7 May 1937, to a Bengali Muslim zamindar family known as the Syeds of Bamna based in Barguna, then located under the Backergunge District of the Bengal Presidency. His father, Syed Najmul Ahsan, was the son of Syed Abi Muhammad (d. 1951) and they traced their ancestry to Syed Mir Qadir Bakhsh, who belonged to the Syed family of Malidia in Faridpur. Irtiza Ahsan's great grandfather, Syed Mir Sarwar Jan (d. 1914), who was Bakhsh's son, migrated to Bamna in greater Barisal after marrying Azizunnesa, the daughter of Taluqdar Husayn ad-Din Chowdhury, and eventually inheriting the taluqdari of Ramna-Bamna. Ahsan's uncle Syed Ziaul Ahsan, was a speaker for the East Bengal Legislative Assembly during the United Front regime and married to Syeda Shaukat Ara Begum, the daughter of Syed Abdul Jabbar, a zamindar of Comilla. His other uncle Syed Moinul Ahsan, was the vice-principal of Dhaka College and the father of former secretariat Shamim Ahsan. Ahsan's youngest uncle, Syed Qamarul Ahsan, was a former parliamentarian. Syeda Sajeda Chowdhury, the incumbent deputy leader of the Jatiya Sangsad, is the daughter of Najmul Ahsan's cousin Syed Shah Hamidullah.

== Career ==
During the Bangladesh Liberation War of 1971, Ahsan was the chairman of Bamna Union. Ahsan was elected to parliament from the new Barguna-2 constituency (formerly part of Patuakhali-1) as a Jatiya Party (Ershad) candidate in 1986. He contested the 1991 election as a candidate of National Democratic Party but lost to independent candidate Nurul Islam Moni.
