= Asmat Ali Sikder =

Bangladeshi politician

Advocate Asmat Ali Sikder
- আসমৎ আলী সিকদার

Member of 1st Jatiya Sangsad
- In office 7 March 1973 – 6 November 1975
- Succeeded by: Akhtaruzzaman Alamgir
- Constituency: Patuakhali-1

Member of National Assembly of Pakistan
- In office 1970–1970
- Constituency: NE-70 (Patuakhali-III)

Personal details
- Born: 31 December 1939 Kalikapur, Backergunge District, Bengal Presidency
- Died: 9 May 2001 (aged 61) Bangladesh
- Resting place: Mirpur Martyred Intellectual Graveyard
- Party: Awami League
- Education: University of Dacca; Brojomohun College

Asmat Ali Sikder (Bengali: আসমৎ আলী সিকদার; 31 December 1939 – 9 May 2001) is a Bangladeshi Awami League politician and a former member of parliament for Patuakhali-1.

== Early life and education ==
Sikder was born on 31 December 1939 to a Bengali family of Muslim Shiqdars in the village of Kalikapur in Bamna, Barguna subdivision, Backergunge District, Bengal Presidency. He was the son of Abdul Majid Shiqdar and Afiya Khatun. Sikder completed his matriculation from the Sarwar Jan Pilot Middle School in Bamna, and proceeded to study at the Brojomohun College in Barisal. He graduated from the University of Dacca with a Bachelor of Arts in history in 1961. He completed his Master of Arts in the following year, along with a Bachelor of Laws degree.

== Career ==
He joined the East Pakistan Students League in 1953. During his university years, he was elected as the office secretary of the League's central committee. In 1962, he served as the vice president of the Dacca Hall Students' Union. He joined the Narsingdi College as a history teacher in the following year. In 1954, he lost his job for supporting United Front political candidate Mohiuddin Ahmad. A convocation occurred in the Curzon Hall square in Dhaka University on 24 March 1964 in which students refused to accept certificate from Governor Abdul Monem Khan. This movement was led by Sikder and so he was arrested, tortured and his MA degree was nullified by the Government of Pakistan. After he was released from jail, he started law business in Dhaka Court. He participated in the six point movement. Sikder moved to Barguna in 1969, where he continued his law work and served as the founding vice president of the Barguna Awami League. He also served as the branch's general secretary and contributed in the founding of the Barguna College. He was also the vice president of the Patuakhali subdivisional Awami League in 1969, when the Pakistani government created a separate Patuakhali district which included Barguna and Bhola. During the 1970 Pakistani general election, Sikder was elected as an Awami League candidate from the NE-70 (Patuakhali-III) constituency which consisted of the areas of Barguna, Betagi and Amtali. However, this assembly was not formed because of the war, and Sikder participated in the Bangladesh Liberation War as a freedom fighter. During the 1973 Bangladeshi general election, he was elected from Patuakhali-1 (Barguna-Betagi) as an Awami League candidate.

== Death ==
Sikder died in his home on 9 May 2001. He was buried at the Mirpur Martyred Intellectual Graveyard in Dhaka, leaving behind a son and two daughters.
