= Marichbania =

Marichbania may refer to:

- Marichbania, Barguna, Bangladesh
- Marichbania, Pirojpur, Bangladesh
