= Barguna-2 =

Constituency of Bangladesh's Jatiya Sangsad

Coordinates: 22.04°N 89.97°E

- Constituency for the Jatiya Sangsad
- District: Barguna District
- Division: Barisal Division
- Electorate: 337,744 (2026)

Current constituency
- Created: 1984
- Party: Bangladesh Nationalist Party
- Member: Nurul Islam Moni
- ← 109 Barguna-1 111 Patuakhali-1 →

Barguna-2 is a constituency represented in the Jatiya Sangsad (National Parliament) of Bangladesh since 2026 by Nurul Islam Moni of the Bangladesh Nationalist Party.

== Boundaries ==
The constituency encompasses Bamna, Betagi, and Patharghata upazilas.

== History ==
The constituency was created in 1984 from the Patuakhali-1 constituency when the former Patuakhali District was split into two districts: Barguna and Patuakhali.

Ahead of the 2008 general election, the Election Commission redrew constituency boundaries to reflect population changes revealed by the 2001 Bangladesh census. The 2008 redistricting altered the boundaries of the constituency.

== Members of Parliament ==
Election	Member	Party
1986	Syed Rahmatur Rob Irtiza Ahsan	Jatiya Party
1988	Nurul Islam Moni	Independent
1991	Nurul Islam Moni	Bangladesh Nationalist Party
Feb 1996	Golam Sarwar Hiru	Bangladesh Nationalist Party
Jun 1996	Golam Sarwar Hiru	Islami Oikya Jote
2001	Nurul Islam Moni	Bangladesh Nationalist Party
2008	Golam Sabur Tulu	Awami League
2013 by-election	Showkat Hasanur Rahman Rimon	Awami League
2014	Showkat Hasanur Rahman Rimon	Awami League
2018	Showkat Hasanur Rahman Rimon	Awami League
2024	Sultana Nadira	Awami League
2026	Nurul Islam Moni	Bangladesh Nationalist Party

== Elections ==
=== Elections in the 2020s ===
General Election 2026: Barguna-2
Party	Candidate	Votes	%	±%
BNP	Nurul Islam Moni	90,643	45.75	−1.95
Jamaat	Sultan Ahmad	85,247	43.02	+42.82
IAB	Mizanur Rahman	16,463	8.30	−1.00
Majority		5,396	2.72	−71.58
Turnout		198,121	58.66	−0.14
Registered electors		337,744		
BNP gain from AL				

=== Elections in the 2010s ===
General Election 2014: Barguna-2
Party	Candidate	Votes	%	±%
AL	Showkat Hasanur Rahman	117,382	86.2	
Independent	Abul Hossain Sikder	16,129	11.8	
Gano Front	Md. Kamruzzaman Liton	2,717	2.0	
Majority		101,253	74.3	
Turnout		136,228	58.8	
AL hold				

Golam Sabur Tulu died in July 2013. Showkat Hasanur Rahman of the Awami League was elected in an October by-election.

=== Elections in the 2000s ===
General Election 2008: Barguna-2
Party	Candidate	Votes	%	±%
AL	Golam Sabur Tulu	90,161	52.0	+25.2
BNP	Khondokar Mahbub Hossain	66,433	38.3	−9.4
IAB	Sayed Ashak Md. Abul Khair	16,138	9.3	N/A
BDB	Abdur Rahman	312	0.2	N/A
Jamaat	Sultan Ahmad	273	0.2	N/A
Majority		23,728	13.7	−7.1
Turnout		173,317	85.5	+16.4
AL gain from BNP				

General Election 2001: Barguna-2
Party	Candidate	Votes	%	±%
BNP	Nurul Islam Moni	44,014	47.7	+22.2
AL	Golam Sarwar Hiru	24,772	26.8	+4.2
Jatiya Party (M)	Anwar Hossain Manju	19,350	21.0	N/A
IJOF	Md. Nurul Islam Khan	2,934	3.2	N/A
Bangladesh Samajtantrik Dal (Mahbub)	Md. Altaf Hossain Badal	1,175	1.3	N/A
Independent	Sali Uddin	58	0.1	N/A
Independent	Md. Bellal Hossain	57	0.1	N/A
Majority		19,242	20.8	+19.1
Turnout		92,360	69.1	−6.0
BNP gain from IOJ				

=== Elections in the 1990s ===
General Election June 1996: Barguna-2
Party	Candidate	Votes	%	±%
IOJ	Golam Sarwar Hiru	21,848	27.1	N/A
BNP	Nurul Islam Moni	20,505	25.5	+21.3
AL	Golam Kabir	18,185	22.6	+2.7
JP(E)	Khandoker Mahbub Hossain	17,234	21.4	+21.2
Jamaat	Md. Tiabur Rahman	1,583	2.0	N/A
Zaker Party	Md. Mojibur Rahman	504	0.6	−0.2
NAP	Md. Aminul Islam	361	0.4	N/A
BKA	Md. Bojilur Rahman	315	0.4	N/A
Majority		1,343	1.7	−6.8
Turnout		80,535	75.1	+21.0
IOJ gain from Independent				

General Election 1991: Barguna-2
Party	Candidate	Votes	%	±%
Independent	Nurul Islam Moni	19,616	28.4	
AL	Golam Kabir	13,764	19.9	
Independent	Golam Sarwar	11,001	15.9	
NDP	Syed Rahmatur Rob Irtiza Ahsan	9,043	13.1	
Independent	Md. Golam Sarwar Kamal	5,434	7.9	
Independent	Khandoker Mahbub Hossain	4,750	6.9	
BNP	A. K. M. Aktaruzzaman Almgir	2,870	4.2	
BAKSAL	A. Kader Molla	1,216	1.8	
Zaker Party	A. T. M. Hannan	517	0.7	
Independent	Shamsuddin Azad	422	0.6	
Jatiya Samajtantrik Dal-JSD	Nurul Islam	163	0.2	
JP(E)	G. M. Sarwar	152	0.2	
FP	Md. Sobhan Khan	89	0.1	
Majority		5,852	8.5	
Turnout		69,037	54.1	
Independent gain from				
