= Gazaria =

Gazaria may refer to several places:

== Bangladesh ==
- Gazaria Union
- Gazaria Upazila

== Crimea ==
- Perateia (Perateian Gazaria), medieval Crimea
- Gazaria (Genoese colonies), medieval Genoese colonies on the Black Sea in the former Khazaria
- Principality of Theodoro (Theodorite Gazaria), a Gotho-Byzantine state in the medieval Crimea
