= Abdul Kader Mia =

Bengali politician

Abdul Kader Lal Mia
- আব্দুল কাদের লাল মি আব্দুল কাদের মিয়াঞা

Member of the East Bengal Legislative Assembly
- In office 1954–1960
- Constituency: Patuakhali West

Member of the Bengal Legislative Assembly
- In office 1937–1945
- Succeeded by: Shamsuddin Sikder
- Constituency: Patuakhali South

Personal details
- Born: Barguna, Backergunge District, Bengal Presidency
- Died: 1960 East Pakistan
- Party: Krishak Sramik Party; United Front

Abdul Kader (Bengali: আব্দুল কাদের; died 1960), also known by his daak naam Lal Mia (Bengali: লাল মিঞা), was a Bengali politician. He served as a member of the Bengal Legislative Assembly and later the East Bengal Legislative Assembly. He played an important role in the popularisation of the Krishak Praja Party in Greater Barisal.

== Biography ==
Abdul Kader was born into a Bengali Muslim family from the Saheb Bari of Bashbunia in Barguna, Backergunge District, Bengal Presidency. He contested in the 1937 Bengal legislative elections as a Krishak Praja Party candidate, and successfully defeated his rival Abi Abdullah Khan Chan Miah of the All-India Muslim League. His constituency, Patuakhali South, covered Betagi, Barguna Sadar, Amtali and Khepupara. The party struggled to gain support at the 1946 elections due to the popularity of the Muslim League's Pakistan Movement. In this election, Mia lost the Patuakhali South constituency to Abdur Rahman Khan of the Muslim League.

The 1954 East Bengal Legislative Assembly election was the first legislative election in the Dominion of Pakistan, and Abdul Kader contested as a candidate of the Krishak Sramik Party under its United Front coalition in the Patuakhali West constituency. He was thus elected as a member of the East Bengal Legislative Assembly.

== Death and legacy ==
He died in 1960. The Abdul Kader Road in Bashbunia is named after him. His elder son, educationist Abdul Halim Bacchu, was one of the three pioneers of cycling in Barguna town and the founder of the Lal Mia Teachers Training College. His youngest son, Abdul Alim Himu, was a notable journalist and the founding chairman of the Barguna Press Club.
