= Bibi Chini Mosque =

Archaeological site located in Barguna, Bangladesh

- বিবি চিনি মসজিদ
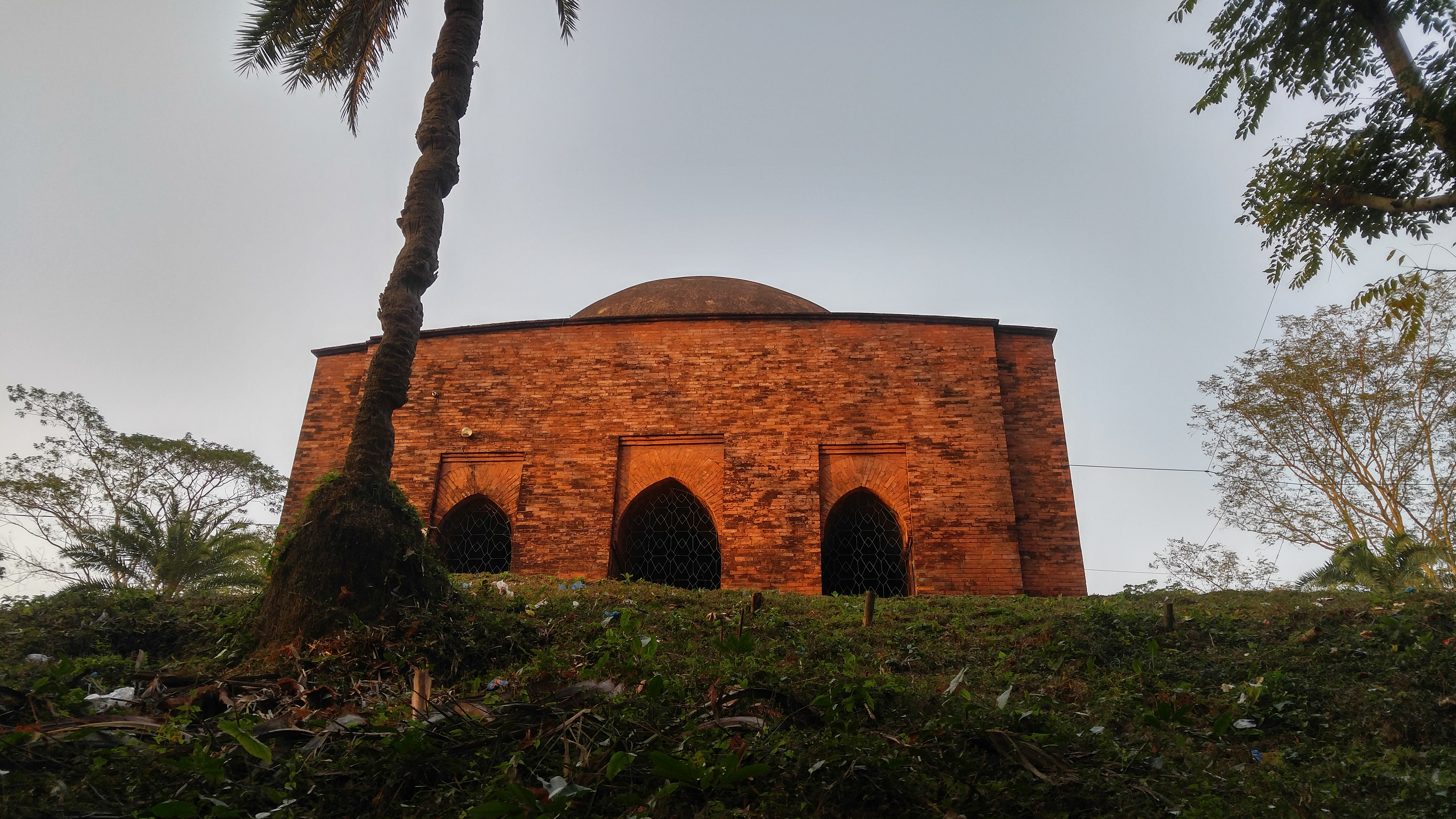

- Location within Bangladesh

Religion
- Affiliation: Sunni Islam
- Ecclesiastical or organizational status: Mosque
- Ownership: Department of Archaeology
- Status: Protected

Location
- Location: Betagi Upazila, Barguna District
- Country: Bangladesh
- Interactive map of Bibi Chini Mosque
- Coordinates: 22°28′25″N 90°11′39″E

Architecture
- Type: mosque
- Style: Mughal
- Founder: Shah Neyamat Ullah
- Completed: 17th century

Specifications
- Length: 10 m (33 ft)
- Width: 10 m (33 ft)
- Dome: 1

Bibi Chini Mosque (Bengali: বিবি চিনি মসজিদ) is an ancient mosque and archaeological site located in Barguna District of Bangladesh. It is located in the Bibi Chini village of Betagi Upazila. This Mughal-style mosque was built by an Islamic preacher named Shah Neyamat Ullah.

== Overview ==
The mosque has three access points. It is 10 metres (33 ft) tall, 10 metres (33 ft) wide and the walls of the mosque are about 1.8 metres (6 ft) wide. Shah Neyamat Ullah came to this region with some disciples in 1659 when Shah Shuja was the governor of Bengal and Odisha. Shuja requested him to build this mosque. The village was named after Chini Bibi, daughter of Shah Neyamat Ullah. Since the mosque is located in the village, later it also became known as Bibi Chini Mosque. Neyamat Ullah died in 1700.

The mosque was first renovated in 1985 by the Betagi Upazila administration. In 1992, the Department of Archaeology took charge of the maintenance and renovation of the mosque and listed it as an archaeological site.

== Gallery ==
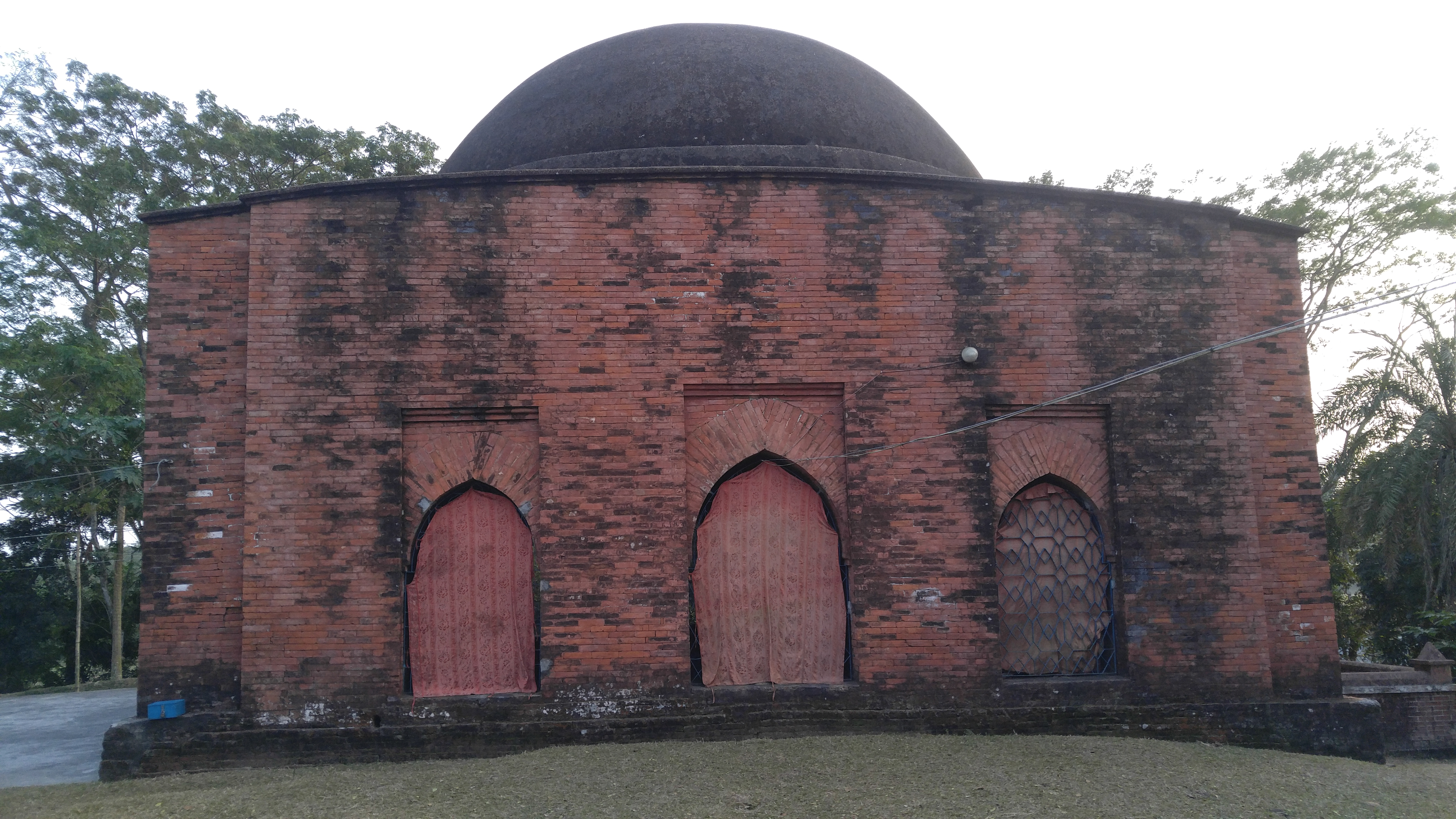
Rear view of the mosque

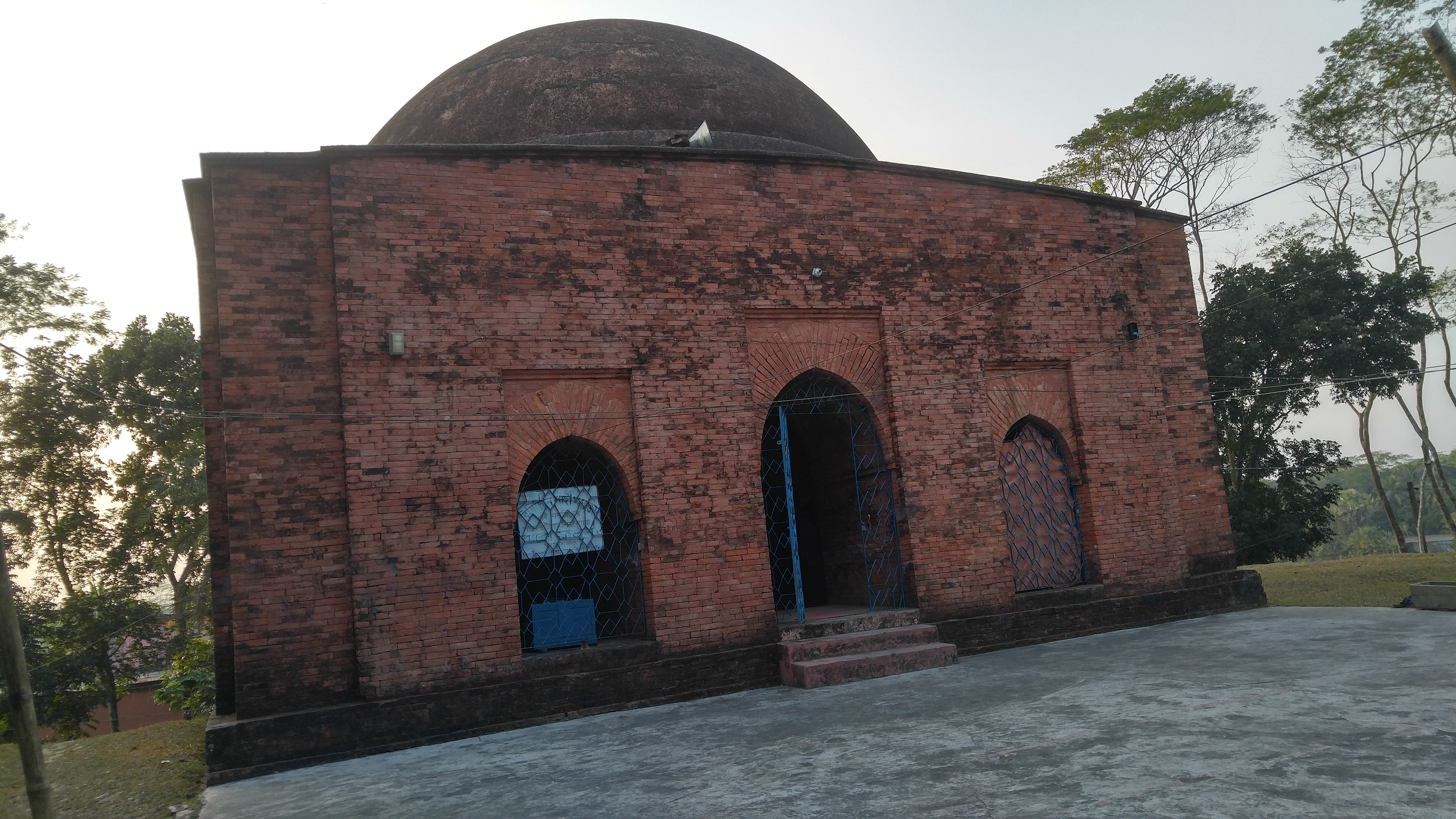
Entrance door

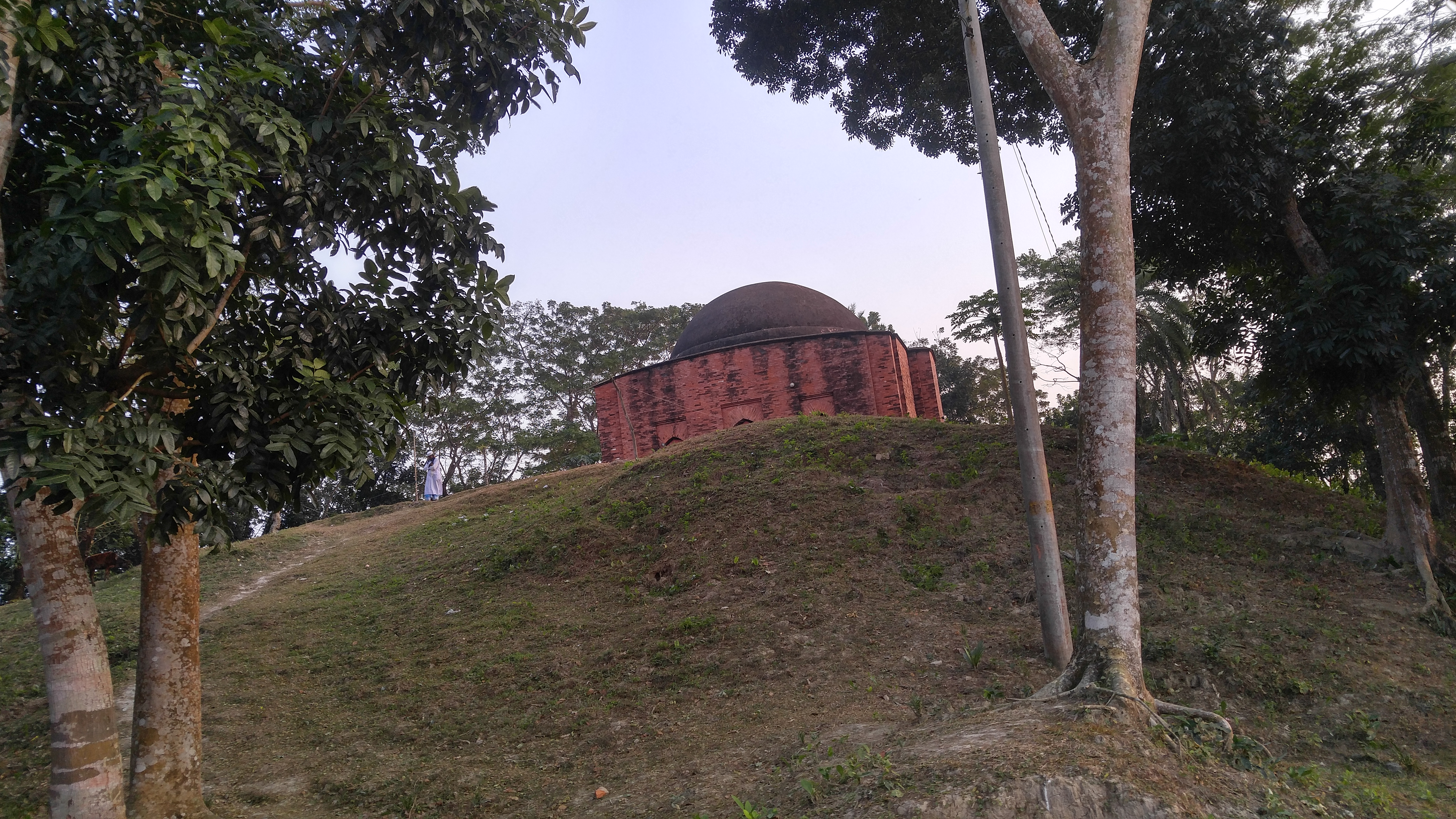

== See also ==
- Islam in Bangladesh
- List of mosques in Bangladesh
- List of archaeological sites in Bangladesh
