= Mohammad Keramat Ali =

Bangladeshi public servant and politician

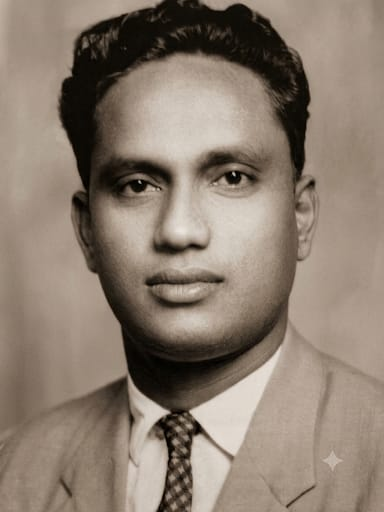

Member of Bangladesh Parliament
- In office 1991–1996
- Preceded by: Sardar Abdur Rashid
- Succeeded by: Shahjahan Mia
- Constituency: Patuakhali-1

Personal details
- Born: 1 January 1926
- Died: 4 June 2004 Dhaka
- Party: Bangladesh Nationalist Party
- Education: Barisal Zila School, Kolkata Presidency College

Mohammad Keramat Ali (1926-2004) was a senior 20th century civil servant, diplomat, and Bangladesh Nationalist Party politician who represented the Patuakhali-1 constituency in the Parliament of Bangladesh and served in several Cabinet positions following Bangladesh's return to electoral democracy in the 1990s.

== Early life ==
M. Keramat Ali was born in 1926 in a remote village of Dumki in Barisal (Patuakhali), East Bengal, British India. This region became East Pakistan in 1947, and ultimately, Bangladesh in 1971.

Keramat Ali matriculated from Barisal Zilla School in 1943 with high distinction. He completed his intermediate education from Brojomohun College (BM College), Barisal, one of the oldest institutions of higher education in Bangladesh, in 1945. He graduated from Presidency College, Calcutta (Kolkata), India, in 1948.

== Career ==
Ali was elected to parliament from Patuakhali-1 as a Bangladesh Nationalist Party candidate in 1991. He was minister of commerce from March to November 1991 and of posts and telecommunications from then until September 1993.

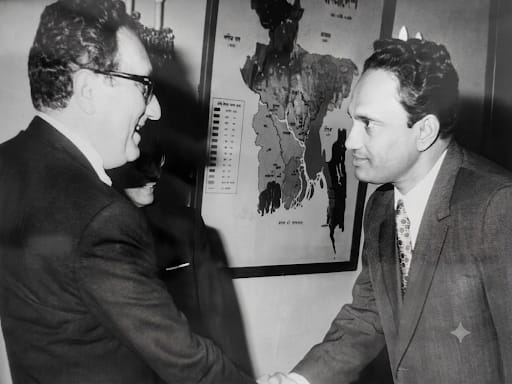
Keramat Ali greets U.S. Secretary of State Henry Kissinger during his October 1974 visit to Dhaka.

== Writings ==
Keramat Ali was an Islamic scholar and published The Message: Selected Verses from the Holy Quran in 1993.
