= Kazirabad =

Kazirabad কাজ়িরাবাদ
- Location in Bangladesh
- Coordinates: 22°16′N 90°8′E
- Country: Bangladesh
- Division: Barisal Division
- District: Barguna District
- Time zone: UTC+6 (Bangladesh Time)

Kazirabad (Bengali: কাজ়িরাবাদ) is a village in Barguna District in the Barisal Division of southern-central Bangladesh.
