= A. F. M. Abdur Rahman =

Bangladeshi Supreme Court justice

- Born: 5 July 1951 (age 75); East Bengal, Dominion of Pakistan (now Gazaria Upazila, Munshiganj District, Bangladesh)
- Education: Central Law College; University of London
- Website: www.justicerahman.webs.com

A. F. M. Abdur Rahman (born 5 July 1951) is a retired justice of the High Court Division of the Supreme Court of Bangladesh. He was elevated to the High Court Division as an additional judge on 27 April 2003, and was confirmed as a permanent judge on 27 April 2005 by then-President of Bangladesh Iajuddin Ahmed. Abdur Rahman retired from the bench on 4 July 2018.

== Early life and education ==
Abdur Rahman was born on 5 July 1951 in East Bengal, Dominion of Pakistan (now Gazaria Upazila, Munshiganj District, Bangladesh) to Dr. Abdul Gaffer Khan and Mosammat Mohsena Begum.

He earned an LLB degree from Central Law College, Dhaka in 1977, and obtained a second LLB with honors from the University of London.

== Career ==
Abdur Rahman was enrolled as an advocate of the District Court on 3 February 1979, the High Court Division on 16 September 1982, and the Appellate Division of the Supreme Court of Bangladesh on 14 January 2000. He has described his field of practice as civil law, banking law, admiralty law, company matters, writ petitions, and arbitration.

He was elevated to the High Court Division as an additional judge on 27 April 2003, and was confirmed as a permanent judge on 27 April 2005. He retired from the bench on 4 July 2018.

At present, he is practising as a Senior Advocate at the Appellate Division of the Supreme Court of Bangladesh and heading his own law firm Rahman Law Associates & Company. He is mostly engaged in commercial and maritime arbitration practice as well as supervising corporate litigation by this firm.
