= Nurul Islam Moni =

Bangladeshi politician

- নুরুল ইসলাম মনি
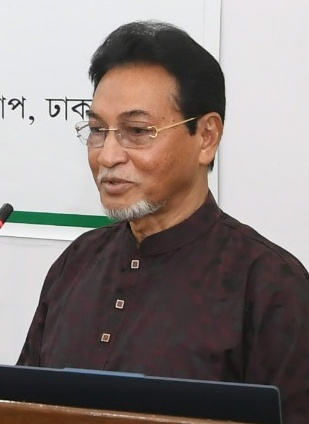
- Moni in 2026

12th Chief Whip of the Jatiya Sangsad
- Incumbent
- Assumed office 2 March 2026
- Leader: Tarique Rahman
- Preceded by: Noor-E-Alam Chowdhury Liton

Member of the Bangladesh Parliament for Barguna-2
- Incumbent
- Assumed office 17 February 2026
- Preceded by: Sultana Nadira
- In office 28 October 2001 – 27 October 2006
- Preceded by: Golam Sarwar Hiru
- Succeeded by: Golam Sabur Tulu
- In office 27 February 1991 – 15 February 1996
- Succeeded by: Golam Sarwar Hiru
- In office 3 March 1988 – 27 February 1991
- Preceded by: Syed Rahmatur Rob Irtiza Ahsan

Personal details
- Born: 23 March 1955 (age 71) Patharghata, Barguna
- Party: Bangladesh Nationalist Party

Nurul Islam Moni is a Bangladesh Nationalist Party politician and a member of parliament for Barguna-2 and Chief Whip of the Jatiya Sangsad.

== Career ==
Moni was elected to parliament from Barguna-2 as an independent candidate in 1988.

Moni was elected to parliament from Barguna-2 as an independent candidate in 1991. He had received 19,616 votes while Golam Kabir of Awami League came second with 13,764.

Moni was elected to parliament from Barguna-2 as a Bangladesh Nationalist Party candidate in 2001. He had received 44,014 votes while his nearest rival Md. Golam Sarowar Hiru of Awami League got 24,772. Anowar Hossain Monju of Jatiya Party came third with 19,350. He received a plot in Chittagong City from the Bangladesh Nationalist Party government.

On 4 November 2007, Moni was sentenced to 14 years imprisonment in a corruption case by Barguna District Court. His brother, Saiful Islam Jamal, was also sentenced to jail in the verdict. They went on the run and surrendered to the Barguna court on 29 October 2008. Judge Md Musharraf Hossain sent them to jail upon surrender.

Moni sought nomination from Bangladesh Nationalist Party for Barguna-2 constituency for the 11th parliamentary election in 2018. The party nominated him for the election.

In September 2022, Moni's motorcade was attacked by Awami League activists injuring him and 50 activists of the Bangladesh Nationalist Party.

He is currently the chief whip of Jatiya Sangsad following the 2026 elections in Bangladesh
