= Barguna Polytechnic Institute =

- Type: Government Polytechnic Institute
- Established: 2006; 19 years ago
- Academic staff: 23
- Administrative staff: 27
- Students: 1,600
- Location: Barguna, Bangladesh
- Campus: Urban, 2 acres (0.81 ha)
- Affiliations: Bangladesh Technical Education Board
- Website: www.bargunapoly.gov.bd

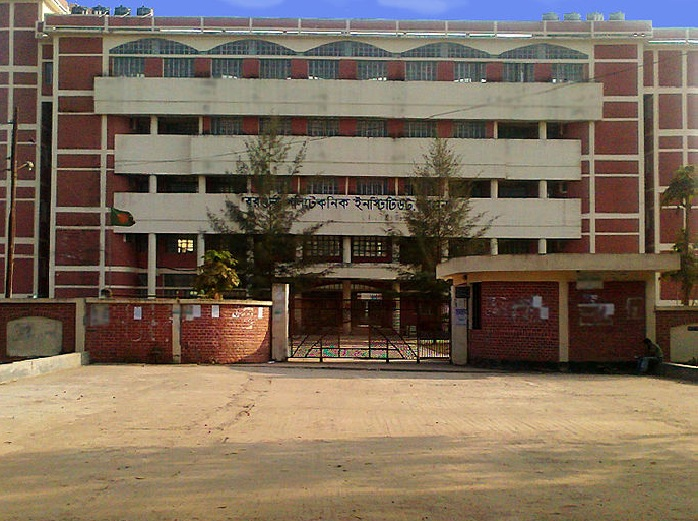
Barguna Polytechnic Institute

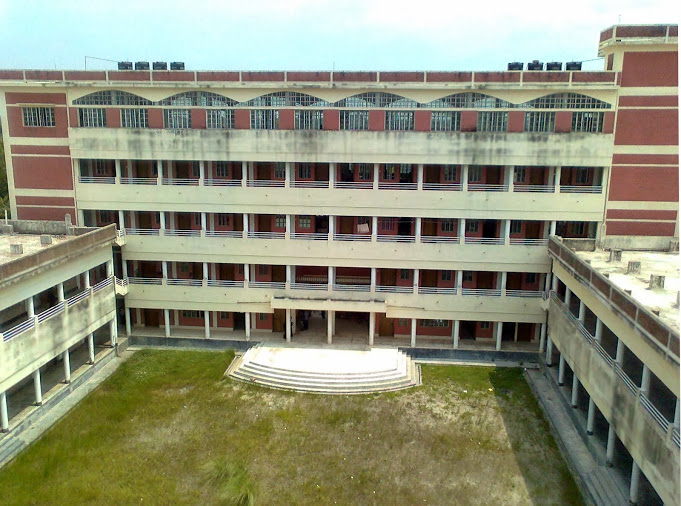
This is an image of Barguna polytechnic Institute in Bangladesh.It is the inside view.Barguna Polytechnic Institute is a Government owned Polytechnic Institute in Bangladesh.

Barguna Polytechnic Institute is a government-owned polytechnic institute in Bangladesh. It was established in 2006 at Barguna, in Barguna District.

The institute is situated at Barguna near the 'Khakdon' river in Bangladesh. It is about 3 kilometres (1.9 mi) west of the main town of Barguna.

== History ==
Barguna Polytechnic Institute was established in 2006.

Student protests in June 2013 demanded the removal of Principal AZM Masudur Rahman over accusations of corruption and sexual harassment, allegations that he denied. The upazila nirbahi officer (UNO) formed a committee, led by the heads of the polytechnic's five departments, to investigate the charges. The Barguna-Mathbaria-Khulna road, on which the polytechnic is located, was blocked by protesters on multiple occasions. As the committee's investigation continued without result, the demonstrations became increasingly violent, culminating in a 19 June clash between police and about a thousand students in which 50 students and 5 police were injured, and 13 students were arrested. After that, students avoided campus, bringing classes to a halt. On 30 June, Mainul Ahsan was appointed acting principal, replacing Rahman, but the standoff between the administration and students continued for at least another 10 days.

== Academics ==
The polytechnic offers a four-year course of study leading to a Diploma in Engineering in one of five specialities:

1. Computer Technology
2. Electronics Technology
3. Civil Technology
4. Environment Technology
5. Refrigeration and air conditioning Technology

Candidates have to take an admission test to be admitted. There are two shifts of classes, the first shift in the morning and the second shift later in the day.
