= Bamna Upazila =

Sub-district

Bamna বামনা
- Upazila
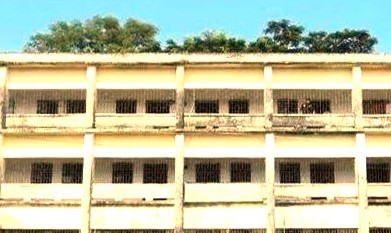
- Government Bamna College

- Coordinates: 22°18.1′N 90°6′E
- Country: Bangladesh
- Division: Barisal Division
- District: Barguna District

Area
  - Total: 101.05 km^{2} (39.02 sq mi)

Population (2022)
  - Total: 78,942
  - Density: 781.22/km^{2} (2,023.3/sq mi)
- Time zone: UTC+6 (BST)
- Postal code: 8730
- Website: Official Map of the Bamna Upazila

Bamna (Bengali: বামনা) is an upazila of Barguna District in Barisal, Bangladesh.

== Etymology ==
According to local tradition, the name Bamna derives from an incident involving the Bawalis, traditional forest-dwelling woodcutters, who once navigated the Bishkhali River in their Bawali boats. In those days, the surrounding region formed part of the vast Sundarbans mangrove expanse. Legend recounts that during one such voyage, a man named Baman fell overboard around this area and vanished into the river's depths. In commemoration of this unfortunate event, the locality came to be known as Bamna.

== Geography and climate ==
Bamna Upazila is surrounded by Kathalia Upazila to the north, Mathbaria Upazila to the west, Betagi and Barguna Sadar upazilas to the east, and Patharghata Upazila to the south. Bamna Upazila is situated on the banks of the Holta River to the west and the Bishkhali River to the east. Bamna has immense potential to prosper from its natural resources but has suffered from successive natural disasters. Cyclones and tidal waves in 1961, 1965, 1970, and 1991, and the impacts of Cyclone Sidr in 2007 and Cyclone Aila in 2009, have repeatedly battered Bamna Upazila.

== History ==
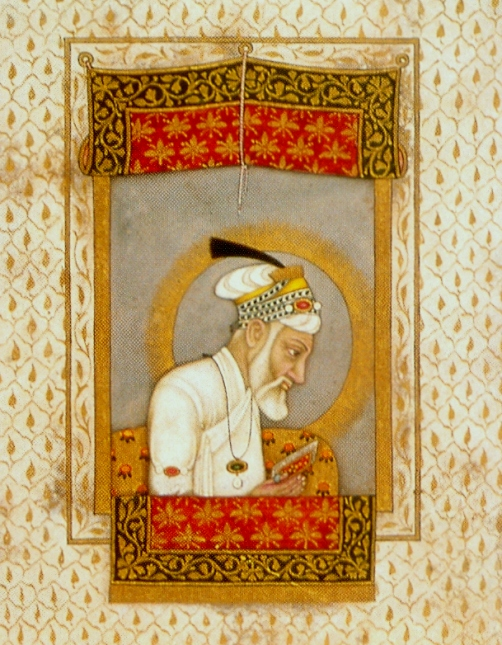
Bamna was formerly part of the Pargana Buzurg-Umedpur, which was gifted to Buzurg Umed Khan by the Mughal emperor Aurangzeb.

The area now comprising Bamna Upazila was part of the Chandradwip kingdom and thereafter Pargana Buzurg-Umedpur, which was gifted to Buzurg Umed Khan by the Mughal emperor Aurangzeb. The pargana's largest taluq was the uninhabited Ramna-Bamna Taluq. In the 17th century, attempts were made to cultivate it in a few places. Due to the oppression of Magh and Portuguese pirates, no settlement was established. After the arrival of the East India Company in the middle of the 18th century, salt began to be cultivated in the region, and the taluq was leased to Sadashiva Majumdar, and later the Armenian merchant Khwaja Michael. During the time of the Thomson Partition in 1792, Ramna-Bamna was still a part of the Sundarbans.

In 1795, Ramna-Bamna was occupied by Safizuddin Jamadar, son of Muhammad Idrak of Durgapasha and brother of Zamindar Sidam Chowdhury of Gyanpara. Safizuddin, also known as Safi Mahmud Chowdhury, was a peyada of the East India Company salt-houses in Chechri and Amua who had been promoted to a jamadar. By 1809, with the assistance of the English merchants, Jamadar secured a seven-year revenue settlement for the Ramna-Bamna estate at an annual rent of 1,165 takas. The taluq consisted of 43 villages on the banks of the Bishkhali River. He began to permanently settle in Bamna, and the Saheb Bari Bazaar is named after the Chowdhury Taluqdars of Bamna. He had two sons: Hosenuddin Chowdhury and Nasruddin (Nayebuddin) Chowdhury. Hosenuddin inherited the zamindari estate from his father and is credited with constructing the Rangmahal Chan Pukur (where the Bamna hospital is now located). Khondkar Munshi Samiruddin served as his naib and is considered to be the founder of the Khondkar family in Bamna. Hosenuddin Chowdhury had a son and three daughters: Afsaruddin, Fakhrunnesa, Azizunnesa, and Asmatunnesa.

Mir Sarwar Jan (d. 1914), an heir of the Syeds of Malidia, settled in Bamna after marrying Azizunnesa Chowdhurani. Upon her premature death, he married her widowed elder sister, Fakhrunnesa Chowdhurani, thereby securing proprietary rights over a substantial portion of the Ramna-Bamna estate and emerging as a rival to his brother-in-law Taluqdar Afsaruddin Chowdhury. When Afsaruddin's sole son, Fakhruddin Chowdhury, was still a minor, Sarwar Jan was appointed guardian. After Fakhruddin attained maturity, a prolonged legal battle ensued, culminating in a landmark ruling by His Majesty's Most Honourable Privy Council in London, which formally declared Fakhruddin an adult at the age of thirty-six. By then, Fakhruddin had married the sister of Sir Kazi Golam Mohiuddin Faroqui and established his residence in Alekanda, Barisal. Fakhruddin (Nabalak Saheb) was childless and devoted himself to the philanthropic management of an orphanage, with the talukdari transferring over to the newly settled Syed family of Bamna. Sarwar Jan was succeeded by his son Zamindar Syed Abi Muhammad Ahsan (d. 1951), who constructed the Hasina Manzil on Nazimuddin Road, Dacca, which he named after his wife. Ahsan was succeeded by his son, Zamindar Syed Najmul Ahsan, under whom the zamindari was abolished under the East Bengal State Acquisition and Tenancy Act of 1950.

Bamna Upazila was initially part of the Mathbaria thana of Pirojpur subdivision established in 1871. In 1913, greater Mathbaria thana was partitioned, with its eastern portion (consisting of four unions) forming the Bamna Thana. Bamna Thana was a floating thana, its headquarters being a ship, up until 1961, when an actual station was established in Bamna village. This station was swallowed up by the corals of the Bishkhali River in 1964, and so the headquarters was shifted to the village of Safipur in the same year. This village was named after Taluqdar Safi Mahmud Chowdhury (Safizuddin Jamadar). All the establishments that can be seen in Bamna now, such as the police station, hospital, tehsil office, and high school, were built after 1964 as a result of Bishkhali erosion. On 1 January 1969, the greater Pirojpur subdivision was partitioned, with the southern portion forming the new Barguna subdivision including Bamna thana. During the Bangladesh Liberation War in 1971, the headquarters of a sub-sector of Patuakhali Sector No. 9 was located in Bukabunia Union. Bamna thana was liberated from the Pakistan Army on 24 November 1971. The status of Bamna was upgraded to upazila (sub-district) in 1983 as part of President Hussain Muhammad Ershad's decentralisation programme.

== Demographics ==
Historical population
Year	Pop. (000)	±%
1981	64	—
1991	66	+3.1%
2001	70	+6.1%
2011	79	+12.9%
2022	78	−1.3%
Source: Bangladesh Bureau of Statistics

Religions in Bamna Upazila (2022)
Religion	Percent
Islam	93.17%
Hinduism	6.78%
Other or not stated	0.05%

According to the 2022 Bangladeshi census, Bamna Upazila had 20,756 households and a population of 78,942. 8.53% of the population were under 5 years of age. Bamna had a literacy rate (age 7 and over) of 82.51%: 84.22% for males and 81.01% for females, and a sex ratio of 89.94 males for every 100 females. 14,611 (18.51%) lived in urban areas.

Bamna Upazila mauza geocode map

According to the 2011 Census of Bangladesh, Bamna Upazila had a population of 79,564 living in 19,537 households. 17,529 (22.03%) were under 10 years of age. Bamna has a literacy rate (age 7 and over) of 61.1%, compared to the national average of 51.8%, and a sex ratio of 1,018 females per 1,000 males. 7,744 (9.73%) lived in urban areas.

== Administration ==
UNO: Md. Al Imran

Bamna Upazila is divided into four union parishads: Bamna, Bukabunia, Dauatola, and Ramna. The union parishads are subdivided into 39 mauzas and 49 villages. Bamna also has one thana which is known as Bamna Thana.

== Religion ==
Bamna Upazila is a Muslim-majority subdistrict, with 73,550 Muslims inhabiting it. It is home to two Chishti khanqahs. The Chalabhanga Darbar Sharif was founded by Mawlana Syed Abdur Rashid Chishti and is now being led by Mawlana Syed Saad Husayn Chishti. The Chalitabunia Darbar Sharif was founded by Mohiuddin Hasan Chishti, and its current gaddinashin is Alanoor Alauddin Dayal Chishti. Bamna is home to one fazil madrasa, five alim madrasas, nine dakhil madrasas, and eight ibtedayi madrasas.

== Notable people ==
- Syeds of Bamna
  - Syed Rahmatur Rob Irtiza Ahsan (1935–2020), politician
  - Syed Qamarul Ahsan, politician and litterateur
  - Syed Ziaul Ahsan, politician
- Khandaker Mahbub Hossain (1938–2022), politician and advocate
- Asmat Ali Sikder (1939–2001), politician and teacher

== See also ==
- Upazilas of Bangladesh
- Districts of Bangladesh
- Divisions of Bangladesh
- Administrative geography of Bangladesh
