= Hatibandha Union =

Baheratoil Union বহেড়াতৈল ইউনিয়ন
- Location of Baheratoil Union in Bangladesh
- Coordinates: 24.210502°N 90.149240°E
- Country: Bangladesh
- Division: Dhaka Division
- District: Tangail District
- Upazila: Sakhipur Upazila
- Established on: 1984

Government
  - Type: Union Council
  - Chairman: Md. Gias Uddin (Bangladesh Awami League)

Area
  - Total: 60.86 km^{2} (23.50 sq mi)
- Elevation: 14 m (46 ft)

Population (2011)
  - Total: 34,445
  - Density: 566.0/km^{2} (1,466/sq mi)
- Time zone: UTC+6 (BST)
- Postal code: 1950
- Website: baheratoilup.tangail.gov.bd

Baheratoil Union (Bengali: বহেড়াতৈল ইউনিয়ন) is a union of Sakhipur Upazila, Tangail District, Bangladesh. It is situated 29 km east of Tangail, the district headquarters.

== Demographics ==
According to the census of 2011 performed by Bangladesh Bureau of Statistics, the population of Baheratoil union was 34445. There are 8630 households in total.

== Education ==
The literacy rate of Baheratoil Union is 42% (Male-46.2%, Female-38.3%).

== See also ==
- Union Councils of Tangail District
