= Shahjahan Mia =

Bangladeshi politician (1940–2023)

- শাহজাহান মিয়া

Member of Parliament for Patuakhali-1
- In office 7 January 2019 – 21 October 2023
- Preceded by: ABM Ruhul Amin Howlader
- Succeeded by: Afzal Hossain
- In office 6 January 2009 – 5 January 2014
- Preceded by: Altaf Hossain Chowdhury
- Succeeded by: ABM Ruhul Amin Howlader

Minister of State for Religious Affairs
- In office 6 January 2009 – 24 January 2014
- Prime Minister: Sheikh Hasina
- Preceded by: A. F. Hassan Ariff
- Succeeded by: Shamim Kaisar Lincoln

Personal details
- Born: 17 January 1940
- Died: 21 October 2023 (aged 83) Dhaka, Bangladesh
- Resting place: Patuakhali
- Party: Bangladesh Awami League
- Education: LL.B (Hons)
- Occupation: Lawyer

Shahjahan Mia (17 January 1940 – 21 October 2023) was a Bangladesh Awami League politician. He was a Jatiya Sangsad member from Patuakhali-1 constituency. He served as the state minister of religious affairs in the second Sheikh Hasina administration. He served as president of the Patuakhali Zilla Awami League until December 2019.

== Death ==
Shahjahan Mia died on 21 October 2023 while undergoing treatment at the Bangabandhu Sheikh Mujib Medical University Hospital in Dhaka. He was 83.
