= Baheratoil Union =

Baheratoil Union ইউনিয়ন
- Location of Baheratoil Union in Bangladesh
- Coordinates: 24.3245°N 90.0992°E
- Country: Bangladesh
- Division: Dhaka Division
- District: Tangail District
- Upazila: Sakhipur Upazila
- Established: 1984

Government
  - Type: Union council
  - Chairman: Golam Ferdous (Bangladesh Awami League)

Area
  - Total: 43.13 km^{2} (16.65 sq mi)
- Elevation: 14 m (46 ft)

Population (2011)
  - Total: 24,413
  - Density: 566.0/km^{2} (1,466/sq mi)
- Time zone: UTC+6 (BST)
- Postal code: 1950
- Website: baheratoilup.tangail.gov.bd

Baheratoil Union (Bengali: বহেরাতৈল ইউনিয়ন)is a union of Sakhipur Upazila, Tangail District, Bangladesh. It is situated 52 km east of Tangail, the administrative headquarters of the district.

== Demographics ==
According to Population Census 2011 performed by Bangladesh Bureau of Statistics, The total population of Baheratoil union is 24413.There are 6207 households in total.

== Education ==
The literacy rate of Baheratoil Union is 36.1% (Male-38.4%, Female-34.2%).

== See also ==
- Union Councils of Tangail District
