= Taslima Memorial Academy =

High School in Bangladesh

- তাসলিমা মেমোরিয়াল একাডেমি

Location
- College Road; Patharghata Upazila, Barguna District; 8720; Bangladesh
- Coordinates: 22.044291°N 89.970412°E

Information
- Motto: শিক্ষার জন্য এসো, সেবার তরে যাও
- Established: 1995
- School board: Board of Intermediate and Secondary Education, Barisal
- School district: Barguna District
- Headmaster: Abul Bashar Azad
- Faculty: 30
- Grades: Class I-X
- Gender: Boys and Girls
- Enrollment: 900
- Language: Bengali
- Color
- Communities served: Scouting

Taslima Memorial Academy is a high school located at Patharghata Upazila in Barguna District, Bangladesh. It is one of the top ranked high schools in Barisal Education Board and the first ranked school in Barguna District. It is a semi-public educational institution located at College Road. It was founded by ex Mayor of Patharghata, Mallik Mohammad Ayub, on January 1, 1995. The school offers grades from class I to class X. It has two shifts, morning and day. The morning shift starts at 7:00 am and the day shift starts at 10:00 am.

== History ==
The school was founded by Mallik Mohammad Ayub on first January, 1995. The school was inaugurated with five teachers and forty six students. Then the school was a kindergarten school and the first principal was Abu Masud. The school was named Taslima Precadet and Child Care Homes after the name of Taslima Begum, wife of Mallik Mohammad Ayub. In 1998, it was upgraded to a secondary school and was renamed Taslima Memorial Academy.

== See also ==
- List of educational institutions in Barisal
