= Showkat Hasanur Rahman Rimon =

Bangladeshi politician and Member of Parliament

Member of Parliament

Personal details
- Born: 25 November 1964
- Political party: Bangladesh Awami League

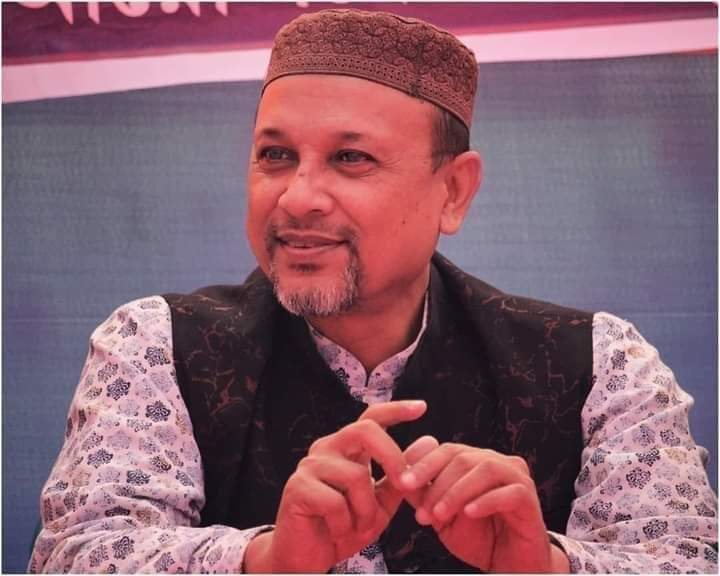
Shaukat Hachanur Rahman Rimon, elected member from Barguna-2 seat of Bangladesh National Parliament

Showkat Hasanur Rahman Rimon (Bengali: শওকত হাচানুর রহমান রিমন) is a Bangladesh Awami League politician and former Member of Parliament from Barguna-2.

== Early life ==
Rimon born on 25 November 1964. He has a bachelor's and a master's degree in science.

== Career ==
Rimon was elected to Parliament in October 2013 in a by-election following the death of the incumbent Golam Sabur Tulu in a road accident. Rimon received 65,813 votes while his nearest rival Golam Sarwar Hiru of Islami Andolon Bangladesh received 57,993 votes. Hiru alleged irregularities in the voting which was denied by Rimon.

Rimon elected to parliament in 2014 from Barguna-2 as a Bangladesh Awami League candidate. In March 2016, he was sued by the Bangladesh Election Commission for allegedly violating the electoral code of conduct. In August 2018 he was sued by the Md Idris Chowdhury, president of the Barguna district Tanti League for extortion. He faced some criticism from local Awami League activists for occupying the land of a religious shrine. He also faced flank for allegedly "insulting" a woman at a local arbitration in Barguna.

Rimon was re-elected in 2018 from Barguna-2 in as a candidate of Awami League.
