= Qamarul Ahsan =

Bangladeshi politician

Syed Qamarul Ahsan
- সৈয়দ কামরুল আহসান; سید قمر الاحسن
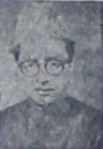

Member of 3rd National Assembly
- In office 1962–1965
- President: Ayub Khan
- Succeeded by: Muazzam Ahmed Choudhury
- Constituency: Sylhet-V

Personal details
- Relatives: Syeda Sajeda Chowdhury; Syed Rahmatur Rob Irtiza Ahsan; Syed Ziaul Ahsan

Syed Qamarul Ahsan (Bengali: সৈয়দ কামরুল আহসান, Urdu: سید قمر الاحسن) was a Bengali politician and litterateur. He was a Member of the 3rd National Assembly of Pakistan, representing the Sylhet-V (Habiganj) constituency.

== Early life and family ==
Syed Qamarul Ahsan was born into a Bengali Muslim zamindar family known as the Syeds of Bamna based in Barguna, then located under the Backergunge District of the Bengal Presidency. His great grandfather, Syed Mir Qadir Bakhsh, belonged to the Syed family of Malidia in Faridpur but Bakhsh's son, Syed Mir Sarwar Jan (d. 1914), migrated to Bamna in greater Barisal after marrying Azizunnesa, the daughter of Taluqdar Husayn ad-Din Chowdhury, and eventually inheriting the taluqdari of Ramna-Bamna.

Qamarul Ahsan was the fourth son among the four sons and one daughter of Syed Abi Muhammad (d. 1951). His eldest brother, Syed Najmul Ahsan, was the father of Bangladeshi parliamentarian Syed Rahmatur Rob Irtiza Ahsan. The second brother, Syed Ziaul Ahsan, was a speaker for the East Bengal Legislative Assembly during the United Front regime and married to Syeda Shaukat Ara Begum, the daughter of Syed Abdul Jabbar, a zamindar of Comilla. His third brother, Syed Moinul Ahsan, was the vice-principal of Dhaka College and the father of former secretariat Shamim Ahsan. Syeda Sajeda Chowdhury, the incumbent deputy leader of the Jatiya Sangsad, is the daughter of Qamarul Ahsan's cousin Syed Shah Hamidullah.

== Career ==
Qamarul Ahsan was a Member of the 3rd National Assembly of Pakistan representing Sylhet-V (Habiganj Subdivision).
