= Golam Sabur Tulu =

Bangladeshi politician

Member of Parliament
- In office 2008–2013
- Preceded by: Nurul Islam Moni
- Succeeded by: Showkat Hasanur Rahman Rimon

Personal details
- Died: 27 July 2013
- Political party: Bangladesh Awami League
- Spouse: Sultana Nadira

Golam Sabur Tulu was a Bangladesh Awami League politician and former Member of Parliament from Barguna-2.

== Career ==
Tulu was elected to parliament from Barguna-2 as a Bangladesh Awami League candidate in 2008.

== Death ==
Tulu was killed on 27 July 2013 in a road accident on Vanga in Faridpur District.
