= Golam Sarwar Hiru =

Bangladeshi politician (1949–2026)

- গোলাম সরোয়ার হিরু

Member of Bangladesh Parliament
- In office 1996–2001
- Preceded by: Nurul Islam Moni
- Succeeded by: Nurul Islam Moni

Personal details
- Born: 30 August 1949 Kalmegha Union, East Bengal, Pakistan
- Died: 27 July 2026 (aged 76) Dhaka, Bangladesh
- Party: Islami Oikya Jote

Golam Sarwar Hiru (30 August 1949 – 27 July 2026) was a Bangladeshi Islami Oikya Jote politician who was a member of parliament for Barguna-2.

== Life and career ==
Hiru was elected to parliament from Barguna-2 as an Islami Oikya Jote candidate in 1996. In the 7th Jatiya Sangshad session, he was the sole representative of Islami Oikya Front. He was threatened with expulsion for breaking party discipline.

Hiru died in Dhaka on 27 July 2026, at the age of 76.
