= Dariapur Union =

Dariapur Union দাড়িয়াপুর ইউনিয়ন
- Location of Dariapur Union in Bangladesh
- Coordinates: 24.2796°N 90.1009°E
- Country: Bangladesh
- Division: Dhaka Division
- District: Tangail District
- Upazila: Sakhipur Upazila
- Established on: 2011

Government
  - Type: Union Council
  - Chairman: Ansar Ali Asif (Bangladesh Awami League)
- Elevation: 22 m (72 ft)

Population (2011)
  - Total: 22,190
- Time zone: UTC+6 (BST)
- Postal code: 1950
- Website: dariapurup.tangail.gov.bd

Dariapur Union is a union of Sakhipur Upazila in Tangail District, Bangladesh. It was established in 2011.

== See also ==
- Union Councils of Tangail District
