= Sardar Abdur Rashid =

Bangladeshi politician

Member of Bangladesh Parliament
- In office 1986–1988
- Preceded by: Akhtaruzzaman Alamgir
- Succeeded by: Sardar Abdur Rashid
- In office 1988–1991
- Preceded by: Sardar Abdur Rashid
- Succeeded by: Mohammad Keramat Ali

Personal details
- Born: Kalikapur, Patuakhali
- Party: Jatiya Party (Ershad)
- Education: Patuakhali Government College

Sardar Abdur Rashid is a Jatiya Party (Ershad) politician and a former member of parliament for Patuakhali-1.

== Career ==
Rashid fought in Bangladesh Liberation war. His sisters, SM Monwara Monu and SM Anwara Anu, also fought in the war. He was elected to parliament from Patuakhali-1 as a Jatiya Party candidate in 1986.
