= Altaf Hossain Choudhury =

Bangladeshi politician

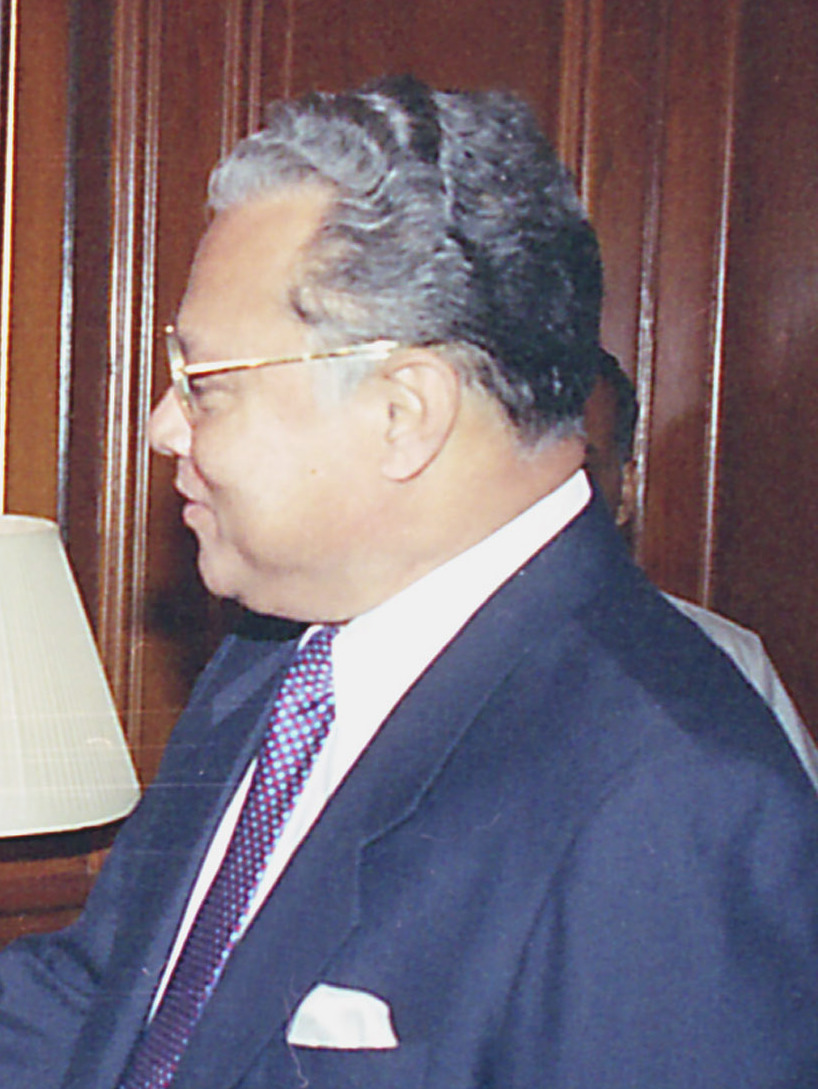
- Chowdhury in 2004

Member of the Bangladesh Parliament for Patuakhali-1
- Incumbent
- Assumed office 17 February 2026
- Preceded by: A. B. M. Ruhul Amin Howlader
- In office 28 October 2001 – 27 October 2006
- Preceded by: Shahjahan Mia
- Succeeded by: Shahjahan Mia

8th Chief of Air Staff
- In office 4 June 1991 – 3 June 1995
- President: Shahabuddin Ahmed (acting); Abdur Rahman Biswas
- Prime Minister: Khaleda Zia
- Preceded by: Momtaz Uddin Ahmed
- Succeeded by: Jamal Uddin Ahmed

Minister of Home Affairs
- In office 10 October 2001 – 25 March 2004
- Prime Minister: Khaleda Zia
- Preceded by: Mohammed Nasim
- Succeeded by: Sahara Khatun

Minister of Commerce
- In office 25 March 2004 – 24 April 2006
- Prime Minister: Khaleda Zia
- Preceded by: Amir Khasru Mahmud Chowdhury
- Succeeded by: Hafizuddin Ahmed

Personal details
- Born: 1942 or 1943 (age 83–84) Kathaltali, Mirzaganj Upazila, Patuakhali
- Party: Bangladesh Nationalist Party

Military service
- Allegiance: Pakistan (before 1972); Bangladesh
- Branch/service: Pakistan Air Force; Bangladesh Air Force
- Years of service: 1963–1995
- Rank: Air Vice Marshal
- Unit: No. 5 Squadron
- Commands: Commandant of Bangladesh Air Force Academy; Director of Directorate General of Defence Purchase; AOC of BAF Base Matiur Rahman; ACAS (Administration) at Air Headquarters; Chief of Air Staff

Altaf Hossain Choudhury is a Bangladeshi politician and retired military officer who served as the chief of air staff of the Bangladesh Air Force from 1991 to 1995. A senior leader of the Bangladesh Nationalist Party (BNP), he currently serves as a vice chairman of the party's National Executive Committee. Chowdhury served as the minister of home affairs (2001–2004) and minister of commerce (2004–2006). He is a two-term member of the Jatiya Sangsad representing the Patuakhali-1 constituency, having previously served from 2001 to 2006 and being re-elected in the 13th National Parliament Election held on February 12, 2026.

== Military career ==
Altaf started his career as a fighter pilot in the Pakistan Air Force, qualifying as a lead pilot in the Dassault Mirage III. In 1971, he was a flight lieutenant. He joined the Bangladesh Air Force in 1972 as a squadron leader after being released from detention by Pakistan. Between 1974 and 1977, he was an instructor at the pilot training school. He was the chief of the Bangladesh Air Force from 1991 to 1995.

== Political career ==
After retiring from military service in 1994, he joined the Bangladesh Nationalist Party. He went on to serve as a minister of different ministries and a member of the Jatiya Sangsad during the BNP-Jamaat administration from 2001 until 2006.

Altaf served as the president of the Patuakhali District BNP Unit in 2008. He lost both the 2008 and 2018 general elections to the Awami League candidate Shahjahan Mia. As of 2016, Altaf serves as the vice chairman of the Bangladesh Nationalist Party.

=== Charges ===
Chowdhury was taken into custody of joint forces in May 2007 during the caretaker government's reign. The force seized a shotgun and a rifle, 99 bullets, 970 pieces of saree and 160 pieces of lungi of the government relief materials from his Patuakhali residence.

On 18 December 2007, the Anti-Corruption Commission (ACC) filed a case against Chowdhury for concealing wealth information and amassing wealth worth beyond known sources of income. In April 2017, the High Court cleared the way for a lower court to resume the trial proceedings.

On 26 February 2008, the ACC filed another case accusing Khaleda Zia and 10 of her former cabinet members, including Chowdhury, of taking bribes in the Barapukuria coal mine deal. In December 2017, the High Court asked Chowdhury to surrender to a lower court within four weeks in this case.

On 11 June 2011, Chowdhury and Hafizuddin Ahmed were arrested and sent to jail in connection with an arson case. They were later freed on bail.

== Personal life ==
Chowdhury is married to Suriya Chowdhury. Chowdhury's two brothers, Babul Chowdhury and Shahin Chowdhury, were accused in an armed robbery case in Mirzaganj Upazila in Patuakhali in 2007.
