= Marichbania, Barguna =

Marichbania
- Location in Bangladesh
- Coordinates: 22°17′N 90°18′E
- Country: Bangladesh
- Division: Barisal Division
- District: Barguna District
- Elevation: 6 m (20 ft)
- Time zone: UTC+6 (Bangladesh Time)

Marichbania is a village in Barguna District in the Barisal Division of southern-central Bangladesh.
