= Kakrajan Union =

Kakrajan Union কাকরাজান ইউনিয়ন
- Location of Kakrajan Union in Bangladesh
- Coordinates: 24.401661°N 90.126738°E
- Country: Bangladesh
- Division: Dhaka Division
- District: Tangail District
- Upazila: Sakhipur Upazila
- Established: 1984

Government
  - Type: Union Council
  - Chairman: Md. Dulal Hossain (Independent)

Area
  - Total: 66.8 km^{2} (25.8 sq mi)
- Elevation: 14 m (46 ft)

Population (2011)
  - Total: 38,453
  - Density: 576/km^{2} (1,490/sq mi)
- Time zone: UTC+6 (BST)
- Postal code: 1950
- Website: Official Website of Kakrajan Union

Kakrajan Union (Bengali: কাকরাজান ইউনিয়ন) is a union of Sakhipur Upazila, Tangail District, Bangladesh. It is situated 29 kilometres (18 mi) east of Tangail, the district headquarters.

== Demographics ==
According to the 2011 Bangladesh census, Kakrajan Union had 9,676 households and a population of 38,453. The literacy rate (age 7 and over) was 36% (male: 39.4%, female: 33.1%).

== See also ==
- Union Councils of Tangail District
