= Sakhipur Upazila =

Sakhipur সখিপুর
- Upazila
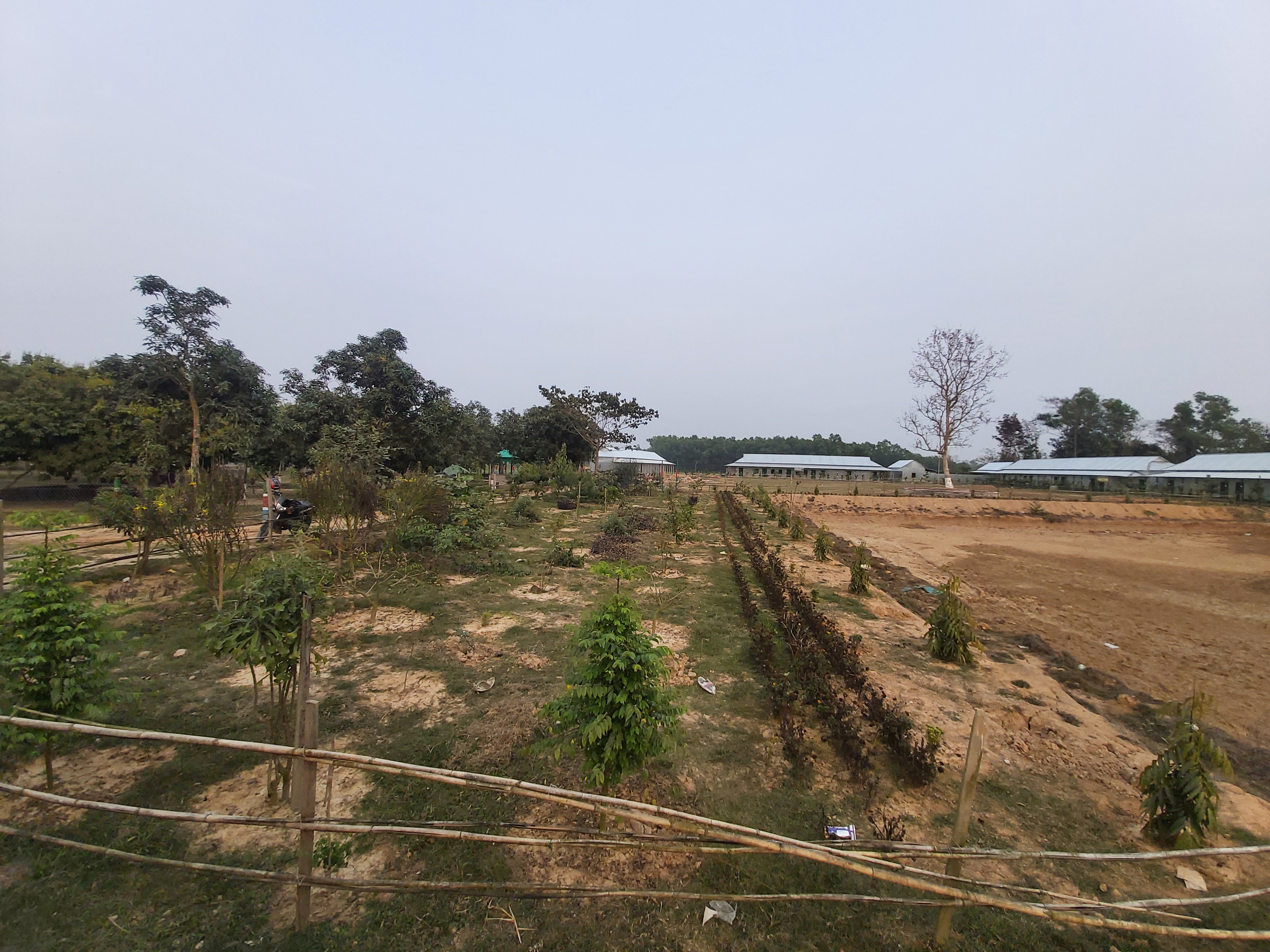
- Chander Haat, Sakhipur

- Coordinates: 24.319205°N 90.172466°E
- Country: Bangladesh
- Division: Dhaka
- District: Tangail
- Headquarters: Sakhipur

Area
  - Total: 435.19 km^{2} (168.03 sq mi)

Population (2022)
  - Total: 322,345
  - Density: 740.70/km^{2} (1,918.4/sq mi)
- Time zone: UTC+6 (BST)
- Postal code: 1950
- Area code: 09232
- Website: www.sakhipur.com

Sakhipur Upazila mauza geocode map

Sakhipur (Bengali: সখিপুর) is an upazila of Tangail District in the division of Dhaka, Bangladesh.

== Demographics ==
Religions in Sakhipur Upazila (2022)
Religion	Percent
Islam	94.50%
Hinduism	5.40%
Other or not stated	0.10%

According to the 2022 Bangladeshi census, Sakhipur Upazila had 89,168 households and a population of 322,345. 8.65% of the population were under 5 years of age. Sakhipur had a literacy rate (age 7 and over) of 66.87%: 70.21% for males and 64.01% for females, and a sex ratio of 87.75 males for every 100 females. 73,964 (22.95%) lived in urban areas.

According to the 2011 Census of Bangladesh, Sakhipur Upazila had 71,009 households and a population of 277,685. 60,420 (21.76%) were under 10 years of age. Sakhipur had a literacy rate (age 7 and over) of 41.06%, compared to the national average of 51.8%, and a sex ratio of 1103 females per 1000 males. 45,645 (16.44%) lived in urban areas. Ethnic population was 3,946 (1.42%), of which Koch were 2,544 and Barman 1,235.

== Administration ==
Sakhipur Upazila is divided into Sakhipur Municipality and Ten union parishads: Baheratoil, Dariapur, Gazaria, Hatibandha, Jadabpur, Kakrajan, Kalia, and Kalmegha, Borochawna and Hateya Razabari. The union parishads are subdivided into 59 mauzas and 122 villages.

Sakhipur Municipality is subdivided into 9 wards and 18 mahallas.

== See also ==
- Upazilas of Bangladesh
- Districts of Bangladesh
- Divisions of Bangladesh
