= Sakhipur =

Sakhipur সখিপুর
- Town
- Location within Bangladesh
- Coordinates: 24.3167°N 90.175°E
- Country: Bangladesh
- Division: Dhaka Division
- District: Tangail District
- Upazila: Sakhipur Upazila

Government
  - Type: Pourashava
  - Administrator: MD. Abdullah Al Roni

Area
  - Total: 18.27 km^{2} (7.05 sq mi)

Population
  - Total: 30,028
  - Density: 1,644/km^{2} (4,257/sq mi)
- Time zone: UTC+6 (BST)
- Postal codes: 1950
- Area code: 9232
- Website: sakhipur.tangail.gov.bd

Sakhipur Municipality mahallah geocode map

Sakhipur (Bengali: সখিপুর) is a town of Sakhipur Upazila, Tangail, Bangladesh. The town is situated 36 kilometres (22 mi) east of Tangail city and 77 kilometres (48 mi) northwest of Dhaka city, the capital of Bangladesh.

== Demographics ==
According to Population Census 2011 performed by Bangladesh Bureau of Statistics, The total population of Sakhipur town is 30028. There are 7473 households in total.

== Education ==
The literacy rate of Sakhipur town is 57.6% (Male-59.8%, Female-55.5%).

== See also ==
- Mirzapur, Bangladesh
- Madhupur, Bangladesh
