= Shahjada Abdul Malek Khan =

Bangladeshi politician

Shahzada Abdul Malek Khan

Member of Bangladesh Parliament

Personal details
- Born: 1925
- Died: 1 April 2007 (aged 81–82)
- Political party: Bangladesh Awami League

Shahzada Abdul Malek Khan (Bengali: শাহজাদা আবদুল মালেক খান, 1925 – 1 April 2007) was a Bangladesh Awami League politician and a member of parliament for Patuakhali-2.

== Early life and family ==
Khan was born in 1925, to a Bengali Muslim political zamindar family known as the Khans of Kaunia based in Betagi which was under the Backergunge District of the Bengal Presidency. The family trace their origins to Qutub Khan, a soldier of Shah Shuja's army, who settled in Kaunia and was given the malikana of Buzurg-Umedpur Taluq. His father, Abi Abdullah Khan Chan Miah, was the founder of the Kaunia zamindar estate and member of the Bengal Legislative Council. His paternal uncle, Abdur Rahman Khan, was a member of the Bengal Legislative Assembly.

== Career ==
Khan was elected to parliament from Patuakhali-2 as a Bangladesh Awami League candidate in 1973. He served as the State Minister of Industries in the second Sheikh Mujibur Rahman cabinet.
