= Sultana Nadira =

Bangladeshi politician

- সুলতানা নাদিরা

Member of the Bangladesh Parliament for Barguna-2
- In office 10 January 2024 – 6 August 2024
- Preceded by: Showkat Hasanur Rahman Rimon

Member of the Bangladesh Parliament for Reserved women's seat-15
- In office 20 February 2019 – 7 January 2024

Personal details
- Born: 27 March 1955 (age 71)
- Party: Bangladesh Awami League

Sultana Nadira (born 27 Mar 1955) is a Bangladeshi politician. She is a former Jatiya Sangsad member representing the Barguna-2 constituency in 2024. Earlier, she had served as Member of 11th Jatiya Sangsad of Reserved Seats for Women. She is a politician of Bangladesh Awami League. Her late husband Golam Sabur Tulu was an MP from her same constituency.
