= Afzal Hossain (Patuakhali politician) =

Bangladeshi politician

Advocate Afzal Hossain is a Bangladesh Awami League politician. He was Jatiya Sangsad member from Patuakhali-1 constituency. He is the Organising Secretary of Awami League central committee. He has been elected in Patuakhali-1 by-polls uncontested. He sworn in as MP on 13 November 2023.
