= Gazaria Upazila =

Gazaria গজারিয়া
- Upazila
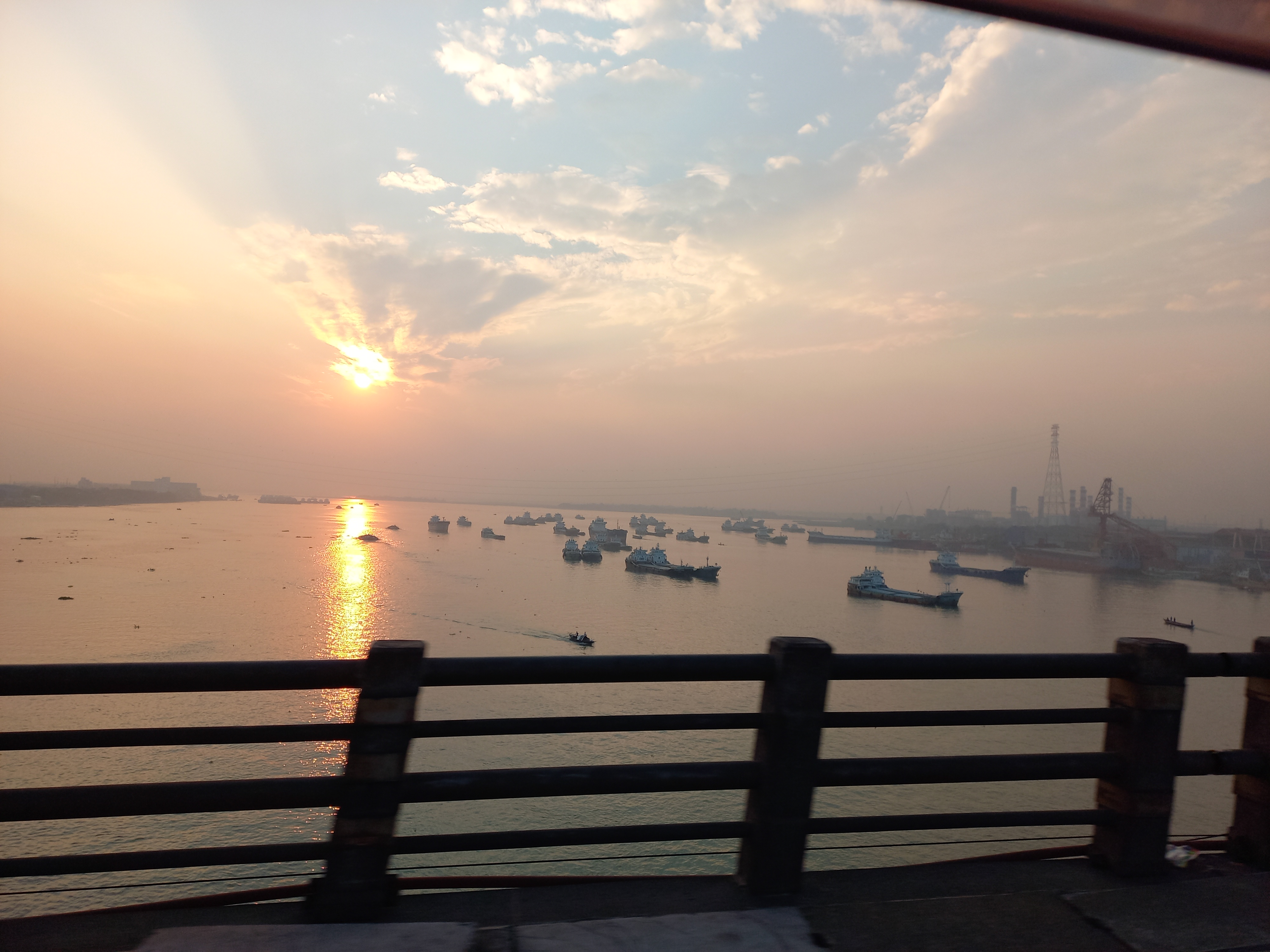
- Meghna Bridge near Gazaria

- Coordinates: 23.5417°N 90.6083°E
- Country: Bangladesh
- Division: Dhaka
- District: Munshiganj

Area
  - Total: 131.00 km^{2} (50.58 sq mi)

Population (2022)
  - Total: 185,259
  - Density: 1,414.2/km^{2} (3,662.7/sq mi)
- Time zone: UTC+6 (BST)
- Postal code: 1510
- Area code: 06922
- Website: gajaria.munshiganj.gov.bd

Gazaria Upazila mauza geocode map

Gazaria Upazila (Bengali: গজারিয়া) is one of the six upazilas of Munshiganj District in Dhaka Division, Bangladesh. It is located on the Meghna river delta, 28 kilometres (17 mi) from the capital city, Dhaka.

== History ==
Gazaria is mainly composed of alluvial land around the Meghna river. The locality became a part of Tippara Thana under the Assam District during British rule. Gazaria became the part of Munshiganj Thana in 1946 and independent Gazaria Thana was established in 1954.

the then government of East Pakistan established Dhaka-Chittagong Highway through the locality. Gazaria Thana was turned into an upazila in 1983 under Hussain Muhammad Ershad's decentralization programme.

=== War of Independence ===
In May 1971, the Pakistani army entered Gazaria by river. A raid on the village of Goshairchar on 9 May killed more than four hundred people. The army proceeded to Bhaberchar where they also killed eleven sheltering in a ditch. Other villages in the area were attacked in the same raid.

Bangladeshi soldiers from Gazaria fought at Bhabercha, Baluakand and Baushia under the leadership of Rafiqul Islam and interrupted communication along the highway by destroying the bridge at Bhaterchar in August 1971, obstructing the advancement of the Pakistani army.

In 2011, the local government constructed a memorial at Goshairchar, Gazaria.

== Geography ==
Gazaria Upazila is located at 23.5417°N 90.6083°E, covering a total area of 130.92 km^{2}. It is the Meghna River delta, which separates it from the district headquarters of Munshiganj. Two bridges connect it with the mainland: the Meghna Bridge in the west, and the Meghna-Gomotee Bridge in the east. The Kajali river flows through the district.

== Demographics ==
Religions in Gazaria Upazila (2022)
Religion	Percent
Islam	96.72%
Hinduism	3.20%
Other or not stated	0.08%

According to the 2022 Bangladeshi census, Gazaria Upazila had 44,537 households and a population of 185,259. 9.00% of the population were under 5 years of age. Gazaria had a literacy rate (age 7 and over) of 76.75%: 79.15% for males and 74.35% for females, and a sex ratio of 100.65 males for every 100 females. 14,176 (7.65%) lived in urban areas.

According to the 2011 Census of Bangladesh, Gazaria Upazila had 34,760 households and a population of 157,988. Out of this population, 34,949 inhabitants (22.12%) were under 10 years of age. Gazaria had a literacy rate (age 7 and over) of 57.19%, compared to the national average of 51.8%, and a sex ratio of 1006 females per 1000 males. 6,559 (4.15%) lived in urban areas.

According to the 1991 Bangladesh census, Gazaria had a population of 128,368.

== Administration ==
Gazaria Upazila is divided into eight union parishads: Baluakandi, Baushia, Gajaria, Guagachia, Hosendee, Imampur, Tengarchar, and Vaberchar. The union parishads are subdivided into 114 mauzas and 133 villages.

== Literacy rate ==
In 2001, Gazaria had a literacy rate of 32.7% (counting people over the age of 7), compared to national figures of 32.4%.
