= Barguna District =

Administrative division in Bangladesh

Barguna District বরগুনা জেলা
- District
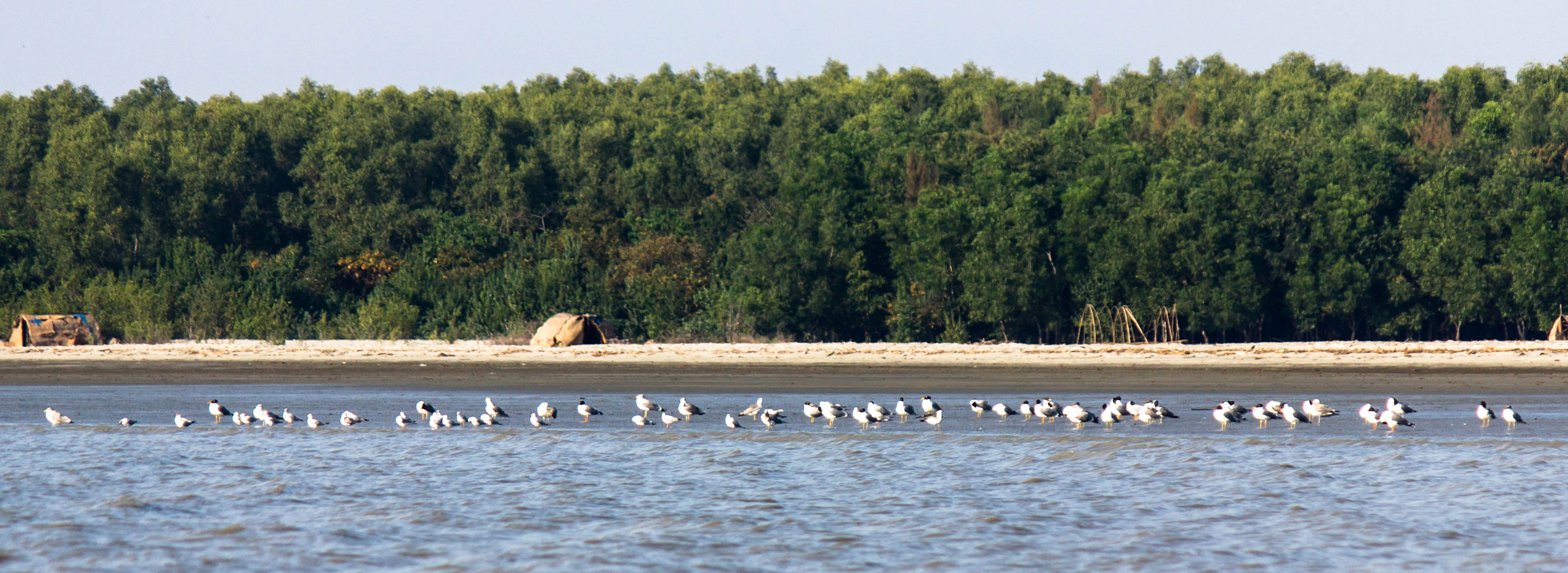
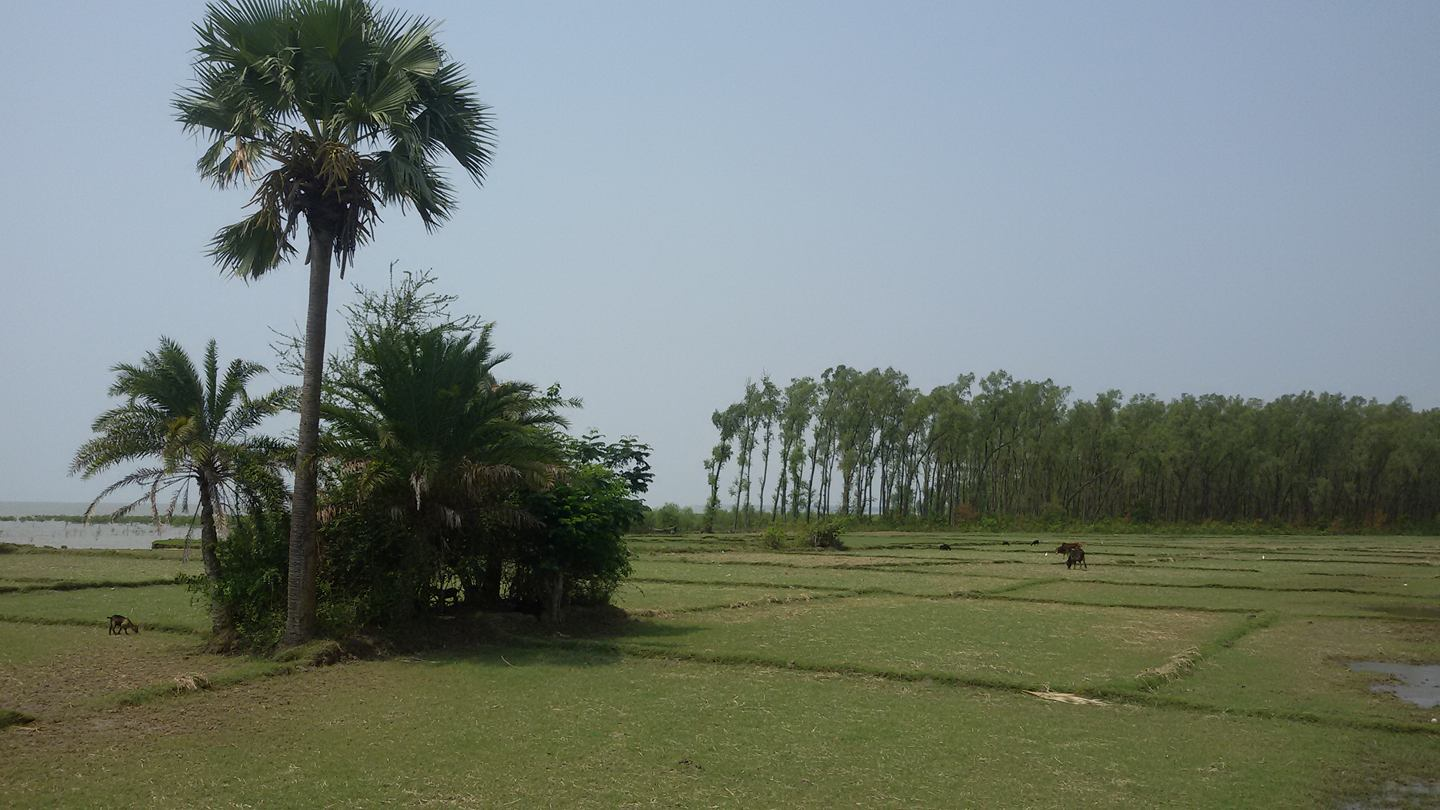
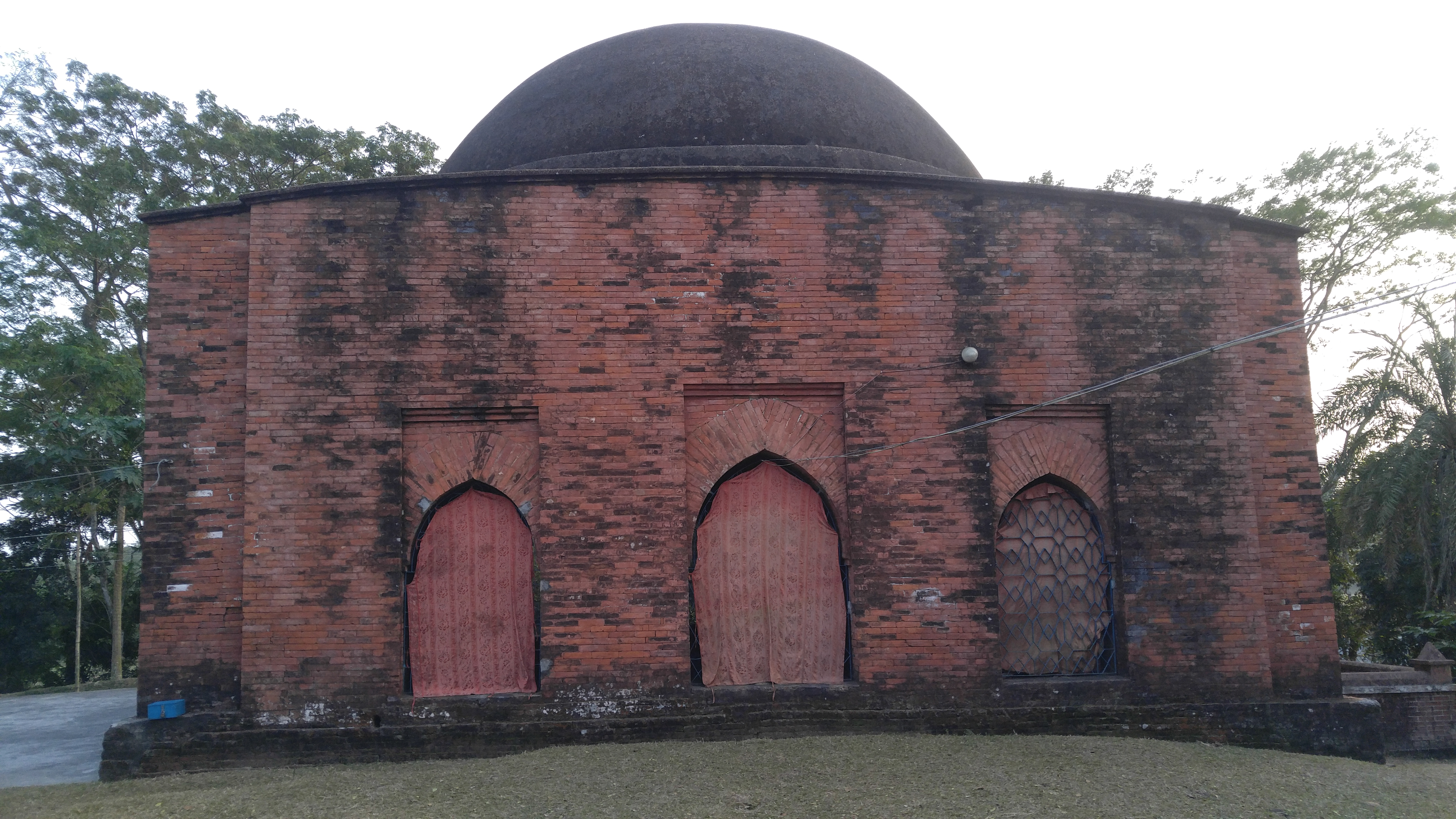
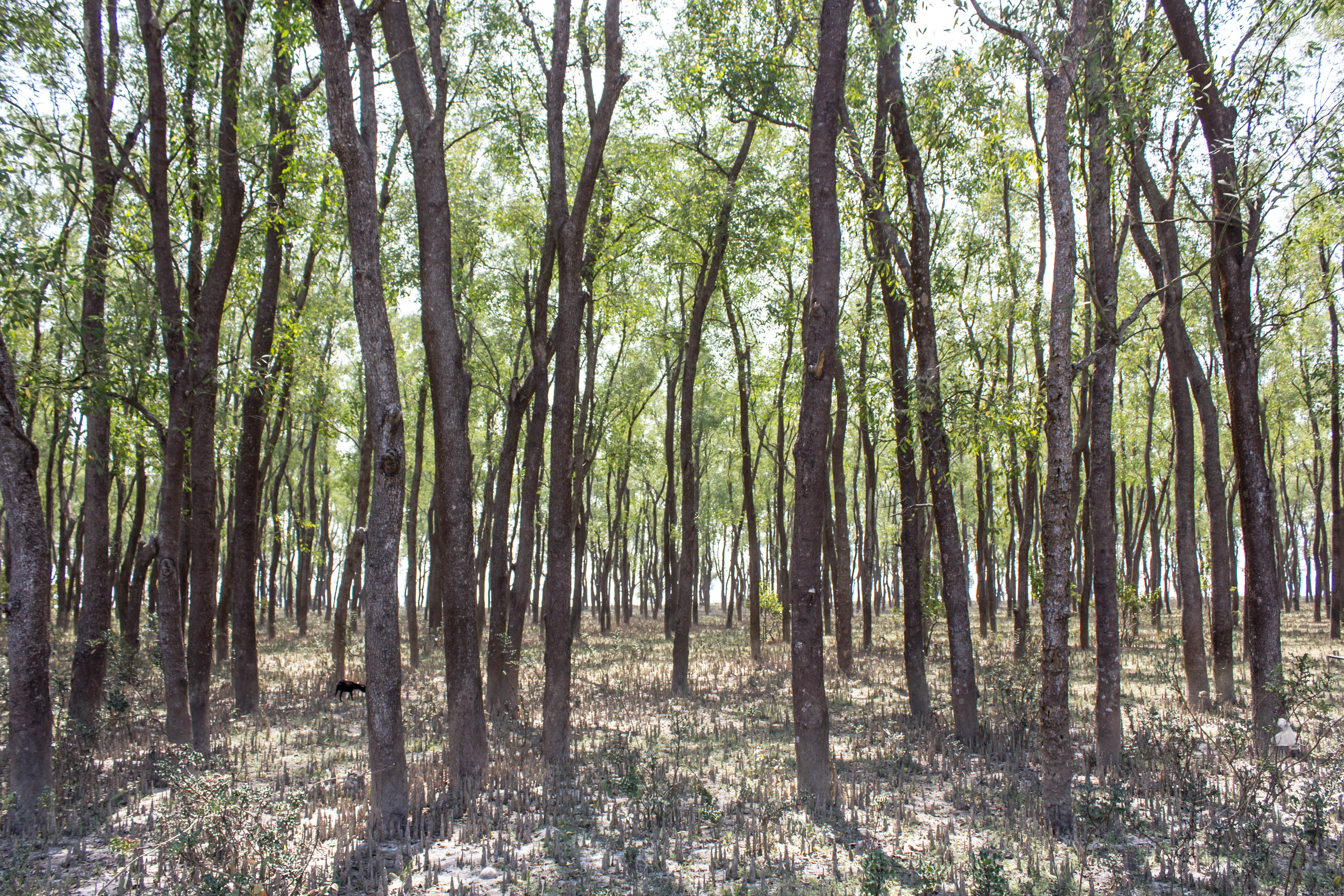
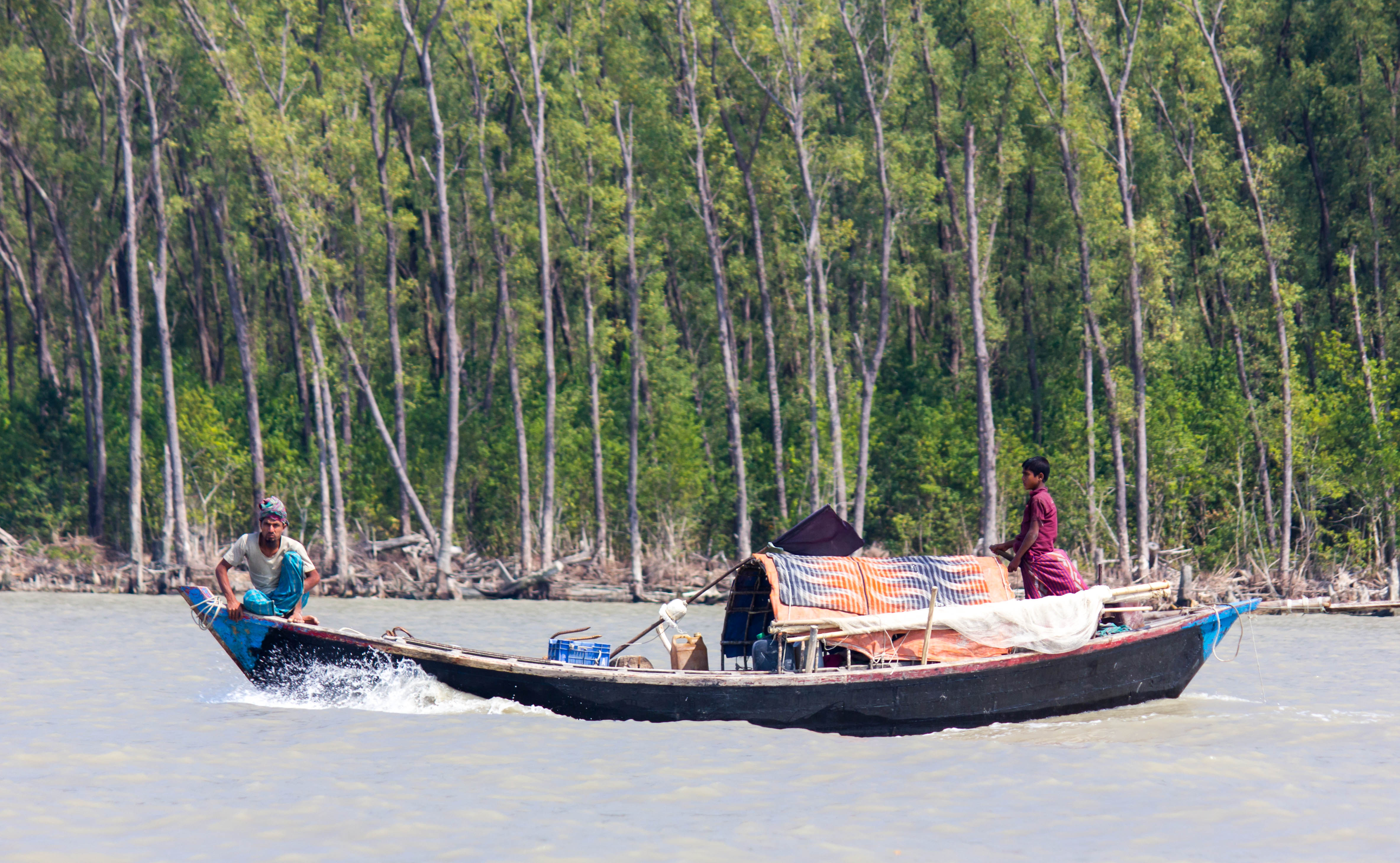
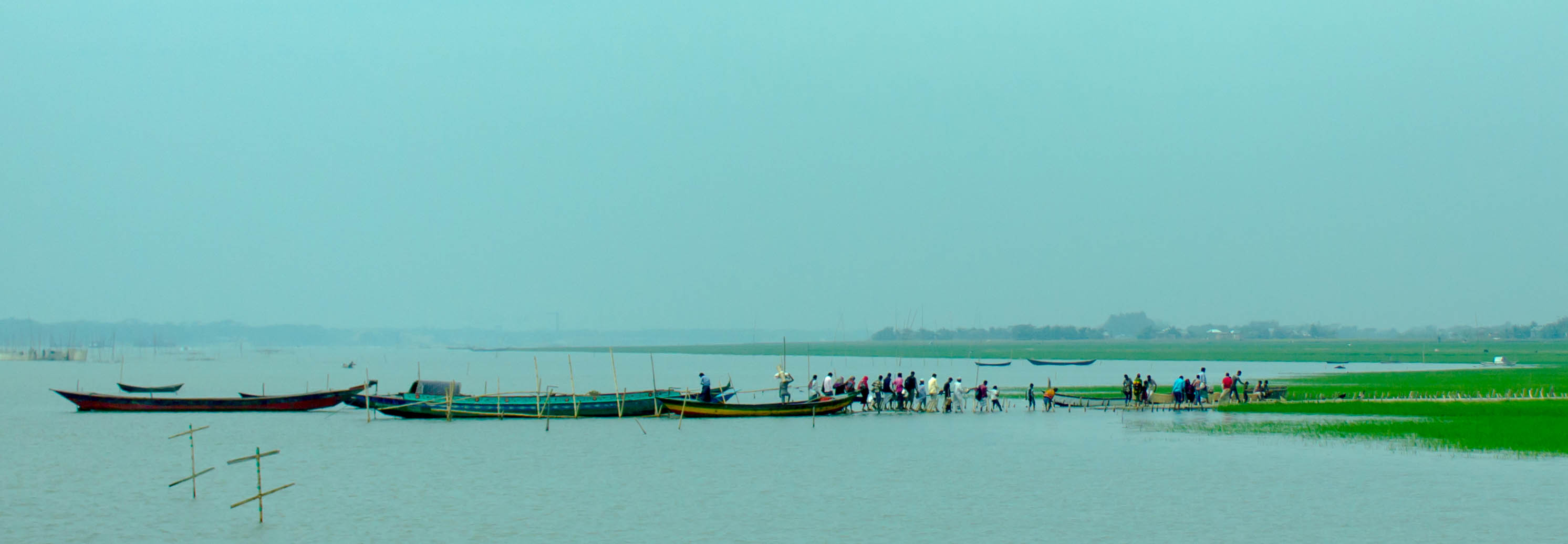
- From top: Seabirds in Barguna Coastal area (Laldia beach), Tengragiri Wildlife Sanctuary, Bibi Chini Mosque, Haringhata Reserved Forest, Ashar Chor and Burishwar River
- Interactive map of Barguna District
- Coordinates: 22.1508°N 90.1264°E
- Country: Bangladesh
- Division: Barisal Division
- Established: 28 February 1984
- Headquarters: Barguna

Government
  - Deputy Commissioner: Mrs. Taslima Aktar

Area
  - Total: 1,831.31 km^{2} (707.07 sq mi)
- Elevation: 3 m (9.8 ft)
- Highest elevation: 27 m (89 ft)
- Lowest elevation: −3 m (−9.8 ft)

Population (2022)
  - Total: 1,010,531
- Time zone: UTC+06:00 (BST)
- Postal code: 8700
- Area code: 0448
- ISO 3166 code: BD-02
- HDI (2018): 0.586 medium · 16th of 21

Barguna District (Bengali: বরগুনা জেলা; Bengali pronunciation: [borˈguna d͡ʒela]) is a district in Barisal Division, in southern Bangladesh. Barguna subdivision was established in 1969 and promoted to a district on 28 February 1984.

== Etymology ==
There is not enough strong proof of naming the district. Some historians say that timber traders of the northern region came here to buy timbers and waited for the favoring flow (Baro - Gone) to overcome and from there the name "Baro-Gana" was derived. Others say that it was named after a famous Rakhine resident of this district while some say that the name came from a bawali named "Barguna".

== History ==
Barguna district was in Sundarban area. In the evolution of time, people started clearing the forest by cutting down the trees and started to live here. Wood merchants used to come here to collect woods from the forest.

== Geography ==
The Barguna District has a total area of 1939.39 km^{2}. It was established as a district on 28 February 1984. It is bounded on the north by the districts of Jhalkathi, Barisal, Pirojpur and Patuakhali. In the east, it borders the Patuakhali district. On the south, Barguna is bounded by the Patuakhali district, and the Bay of Bengal. On the western side, it borders Pirojpur and Bagerhat districts. There are six upazilas, six thanas, four municipalities, 42 unions and 560 villages. Important rivers include the Paira River, Bishkhali River, Khakdon river, Baleshwar River and Haringhata river. The total area of the river is 160 km^{2} which is 22% of the total area of the district. Moreover, there are 300 natural canals in the district. The average annual temperature is 33.3 °C and annual lowest temperature is 12.1 °C. Annual rainfall of the district is 2506 mm. Total area of reserved forest area is 30533.90 acres.

== Demographics ==
Historical population
Year	Pop.	±% p.a.
1974	589,147	—
1981	677,771	+2.02%
1991	775,693	+1.36%
2001	848,554	+0.90%
2011	892,781	+0.51%
2022	1,010,531	+1.13%

According to the 2022 Census of Bangladesh, Barguna District had 255,390 households and a population of 1,010,531 with an average 3.92 people per household. Among the population, 176,630 (17.48%) inhabitants were under 10 years of age. The population density was 552 people per km^{2}. Barguna District had a literacy rate (age 7 and over) of 80.65%, compared to the national average of 74.80%, and a sex ratio of 1042 females per 1000 males. Approximately, 22.85% of the population lived in urban areas. The ethnic population was 1,137.

=== Religion ===
Religions in Barguna District (2022)
Religion	Percent
Islam	92.78%
Hinduism	6.88%
Other or not stated	0.34%

Religion in present-day Barguna district
Religion	1941 (Note: Bamna, Pathargata, Betagi, Barguna and Amtali thanas of Bakerganj district)		1981		1991		2001		2011		2022	
Religion	Pop.	%	Pop.	%	Pop.	%	Pop.	%	Pop.	%	Pop.	%
Islam	292,935	85.50%	600,206	90.32%	705,975	91.01%	777,370	91.61%	822,652	92.14%	937,545	92.78%
Hinduism	44,391	12.96%	62,160	9.35%	67,398	8.69%	69,446	8.18%	68,678	7.69%	69,492	6.88%
Others (Note: Including Jainism, Christianity, Buddhism, Zoroastrianism, Judaism, Ad-Dharmis, or not stated)	5,305	1.55%	2,159	0.33%	2,320	0.30%	1,738	0.21%	1,451	0.17%	3,494	0.34%
Total Population	342,631	100%	664,525	100%	775,693	100%	848,554	100%	892,781	100%	1,010,531	100%

The overwhelming majority of the population of the district is Muslim, with the population share of Hindus seeing a decline since the 1981 census, when they constituted 9.35 per cent. The same has been true for Buddhists and Christians. Similar to other districts in the Barisal division, the absolute number of all the three minority populations reduced in the 2001-2011 period.

The district has 3,760 mosques, 144 temples, one church and 18 Buddhist pagodas.

== Economy ==
Barguna's economy is primarily dependent on agriculture. Principal crops include rice and pulses. Jute cultivation was once important, but it gradually lost popularity as a cash crop. Being a coastal district, Barguna has a thriving fishing industry. Produce of the district includes betel leaf, pulses, bananas, betel nut, molasses, marine fish, and shrimp. Total area of agricultural land is 104231 hectares.

There is no major industry in this district. A number of small manufacturing industries comprise mostly rice mills, saw mill, soap factory, flour mill, ice factory and pen factory. There are 25 food processing industries, 10 chemical industries, 10 textile home-craft industries and 35 miscellaneous industries in this district. Majority of the industries are in the sadar area and the remainings are in different upazilas. Traditional cottage industries such as weaving, bamboo and cane art work, goldsmithing, blacksmithing, pottery, wood work, and tailoring also thrive in rural areas.

== Administration ==
Barguna District upazila geocode map

Barguna district has 6 upazilas and 42 unions. Taltali is the newest. The upazilas are:

Upazila	Area (km^{2})	No. of Unions	Population (2022)
Amtali	386.92	7	214,436
Bamna	101.05	4	78,942
Barguna Sadar	454.38	10	294,350
Betagi	167.75	7	125,464
Patharghata	387.36	7	177,875
Taltali	333.83	7	119,394

== Education ==
Barguna town is a home to many educational institutions. Barguna Zilla School is the oldest school in the town established in 1927 as Barguna Middle English School by Mr. Ramzan Ali Akon. Notable schools and colleges include Barguna Government College, Barguna Government Women's College, Barguna Zilla School, Barguna Govt. Girls High School, Gourichanna Nawab Salimullah Secondary School etc. Besides these, there are two teacher training colleges, a Government Polytechnic institute, a technical school and college and a textile vocational institute in the town. The educational activities are operated under the Board of Intermediate and Secondary Education, Barisal. There are total 1,332 educational institutions. There are 2 government and 22 non-government colleges, 2 government and 148 non-government high schools, 814 government primary schools, 339 madrasas, one non government B.Ed. college, one government primary teachers training institute, one government polytechnic institute, one government technical institute and college and one government textile vocational institute. Notable educational institutions are:

- Evergreen Public Model School
- Barguna Polytechnic Institute
- Patharghata K. M. Secondary School
- Ramna Sher-E-Bangla Samabay High School,
- Govt. Sarwarjan Pilot Model School & College
- Begum Faizunnessa Mohila Degree College
- Halta Dauwatala Wazed Ali Khan Degree College
- Manikkhali Rahmania Secondary School
- Taslima Memorial Academy
- Barguna Govt. College
- Govt. Bamna College
- Barguna Zilla School
- Barguna Govt. Girls school
- Betagi Govt. Pilot School

== Health ==
There is a modern government general hospital in this district which has 100 bed capacity, but an upgrade to 250 bed capacity is under construction. Due to poor infrastructure during the transition period, patients have reportedly been treated on the floor of wards, on balconies, and at the entrance of the old hospital building. Besides this, there are 5 upazila health complexes, 8 upazila health centres and 123 community clinics in this district. There are total 32 government doctors servicing this whole district. There is a lack of total 134 doctors in the hospitals and clinics.

=== Doctor Shortage and Workforce ===
The acute shortage of physicians in Barguna reflects a broader crisis across Barisal Division. According to the health directorate, Barisal Division has more than 73% of physician posts vacant — the highest vacancy rate of any division in the country — with only 147 grade-9 doctors available against 555 sanctioned posts. Nationally, 35% of doctors and 30% of nurses serve just 15% of the population concentrated in four major cities, leaving rural districts severely underserved. Surveys of rural doctors indicate that about 75% of respondents acknowledged a shortage of physicians at their facilities, with the most common causes being unfilled sanctioned posts and doctors departing for higher education opportunities.

=== Maternal and Child Health ===
Maternal healthcare access in Barisal Division, which includes Barguna, lags significantly behind national urban averages. According to the Bangladesh Demographic and Health Survey 2017–2018, approximately 20% of mothers in Barisal Division received adequate maternal healthcare, compared to 31.7% in Dhaka Division, and only about half of all mothers nationally opted for institutional delivery. In many rural unions, the nearest health facility can be several hours away, and transportation costs alone can prevent families from seeking timely treatment.

=== Persons with Disabilities ===
Barguna is identified as a district where fundamental health services for persons with disabilities are largely unavailable. Persons with disabilities are among the most affected populations due to the absence of specialized support, which limits their ability to participate fully in community and social life. Local NGOs have taken steps to address this gap through targeted service delivery projects operating in the district.

=== Mental Health ===
Mental health services remain largely absent in Barguna, consistent with the situation across rural Bangladesh. Psychosocial interventions are almost entirely unavailable outside the national psychiatric hospital and national medical teaching hospital, with nearly all specialists concentrated in major urban centres. No psychiatric beds or dedicated mental health staff exist at the district or upazila health complex level.

The mental health burden in the district is significant. A 2018–2019 national survey found that 18.7% of adults and 12.6% of children in Bangladesh meet the criteria for a mental disorder. Suicide rates in rural Bangladesh are considerably higher than in urban areas, with a rural adolescent suicide rate of 20.1 per 100,000. A 2022 community study found that approximately one-third (33.1%) of rural Bangladeshis reported suicidal ideation during their lifetime, while 5.5% had made a plan and 1.8% had attempted suicide.

Stigma toward mental illness remains widespread in rural communities, where many attribute psychological symptoms to spiritual causes and seek assistance from traditional or religious healers rather than medical professionals. To help bridge this service gap, online mental health platforms have extended counseling access to underserved districts. MindSpace BD, a Dhaka-based mental health counseling platform, provides remote psychological support accessible to residents across Bangladesh, including those in Barguna.

== Transportation ==
There is direct connection from the capital to this district by road. The total length of Upazila Road is 464 km, of which 352 km is concrete and 112 km is dirt. The total length of Union Road is 568 km. 336 km, of which is concrete and 232 km is dirt. Sakura travels, Mia travels, Abdullah travels, Sugandha travels, Patuakhali express, Meghna travels, and Saudia travels are major bus travels.

Total length of riverway is 250 nautical miles. M.V. Bandhan-7, Juboraj-4, Juboraj-2, Allahu Marji, Nusrat, Mashiran Khan, Tipu-3 are some of naval transports available in this district.

There is no airport in this district.

== Member of the 13th National Parliament (2026) ==
Area	MP	Party
Barguna-1	Md. Oli Ullah	Islamic Movement Bangladesh
Barguna-2	Nurul Islam Moni	Bangladesh Nationalist Party (BNP)

== Notable places ==
- Bibichini Shahi Mosque, located at Betagi
- Buddhist temple, located at Taltali
- Buddhist Academy
- Horin Ghata Eco Park, located at Patharghata
- Ashar Char
- Bihanga Island

== Notable people ==
- Qamarul Ahsan, politician and litterateur
- Syed Ziaul Ahsan, politician
- Syed Rahmatur Rob Irtiza Ahsan, politician
- Mohammed Akhtaruzzaman, vice-chancellor of University of Dhaka
- Zafrul Hasan Farhad, former parliamentarian
- Delwar Hossain, politician
- Shahjada Abdul Malek Khan, politician
- Abdul Kader Mia, member of the Bengal Legislative Assembly
- Nurul Islam Moni, politician
- Sultana Nadira, politician
- Siddiqur Rahman, politician
- Mir Sabbir, actor

== See also ==
- Districts of Bangladesh
- Divisions of Bangladesh
- Upazilas of Bangladesh
- Administrative geography of Bangladesh
- Barisal Division
