= Patuakhali-1 =

Constituency of Bangladesh's Jatiya Sangsad

Coordinates: 22.36°N 90.33°E

- Constituency for the Jatiya Sangsad
- District: Patuakhali District
- Division: Barisal Division
- Electorate: 505,840 (2026)

Current constituency
- Created: 1973
- Parliamentary Party: Bangladesh Nationalist Party
- Member of Parliament: Altaf Hossain Choudhury
- ← 110 Barguna-2 112 Patuakhali-2 →

Patuakhali-1 is a constituency represented in the Jatiya Sangsad (National Parliament) of Bangladesh. The current Member of Parliament in this constituency is Altaf Hossain Chowdhury of Bangladesh Nationalist Party.

== Boundaries ==
The constituency encompasses Dumki, Mirzaganj and Patuakhali Sadar upazilas.

== History ==
The constituency was created for the first general elections in newly independent Bangladesh, held in 1973.

Ahead of the 2008 general election, the Election Commission redrew constituency boundaries to reflect population changes revealed by the 2001 Bangladesh census. The 2008 redistricting altered the boundaries of the constituency.

Ahead of the 2014 general election, the Election Commission expanded the boundaries of the constituency. Previously it had excluded three union parishads of Patuakhali Sadar Upazila: Auliapur, Kamalapur, and Lohalia.

== Members of Parliament ==
Election	Member	Party
1973	Asmat Ali Sikder	Awami League
1979	Akhtaruzzaman Alamgir	BNP
Major Boundary Changes
1986	Sardar Abdur Rashid	Jatiya Party
1991	Mohammad Keramat Ali	BNP
Feb 1996	Altaf Hossain Chowdhury	BNP
Jun 1996	Shahjahan Mia	Awami League
2001	Altaf Hossain Chowdhury	BNP
2008	Shahjahan Mia	Awami League
2014	ABM Ruhul Amin Howlader	Jatiya Party
2018	Shahjahan Mia	Awami League
2023 by-election	Afzal Hossain	Awami League
2024	ABM Ruhul Amin Howlader	Jatiya Party
2026	Altaf Hossain Chowdhury	BNP

== Elections ==
=== Elections in the 2020s ===
General election 2026: Patuakhali-1
Party	Candidate	Votes	%	±%
BNP	Altaf Hossain Choudhury	152,087	58.64	+23.34
IAB	Md Firoz Alam	58,161	22.43	+16.73
AB Party	Md Abdul Wahab	46,310	17.85	+17.85
BJSD	Gautam Chandra Shil	1,334	0.51	+0.51
JP(E)	A Manna Hawlader	1,055	0.41	−67.99
GOP	Md. Shahidul	347	0.13	+0.13
Majority		93,926	36.2	−1.7
Turnout		259,294	51.3	+28.5
Registered electors		505,840		
BNP gain from JP(E)				

=== Elections in the 2010s ===
General Election 2014: Patuakhali-1
Party	Candidate	Votes	%	±%
JP(E)	ABM Ruhul Amin Howlader	79,203	68.8	N/A
Independent	Md. Shafiqul Islam	35,582	30.9	N/A
JSD	Habibur Rahman Shawkat	307	0.3	N/A
Majority		43,621	37.9	+15.1
Turnout		115,092	34.5	−48.9
JP(E) gain from AL				

=== Elections in the 2000s ===
General Election 2008: Patuakhali-1
Party	Candidate	Votes	%	±%
AL	Shahjahan Mia	120,132	58.1	+16.7
BNP	Altaf Hossain Choudhury	73,017	35.3	−14.1
IAB	Abdur Rahman	11,804	5.7	N/A
Zaker Party	Md. Abdul Hai	893	0.4	N/A
BTF	Mutawakkil Billah	551	0.3	N/A
BSD	Jahirul Alam	372	0.2	N/A
Majority		47,115	22.8	+14.9
Turnout		206,769	83.4	+22.1
AL gain from BNP				

General Election 2001: Patuakhali-1
Party	Candidate	Votes	%	±%
BNP	Altaf Hossain Chowdhury	95,838	49.4	+10.6
AL	Shahjahan Mia	80,403	41.4	−5.9
IJOF	Mohammad Keramat Ali	17,388	9.0	N/A
CPB	Subhash Chand	348	0.2	N/A
Independent	Mohammad Ruhul Amin	197	0.1	N/A
Majority		15,435	7.9	−0.7
Turnout		194,174	61.3	−0.7
BNP gain from AL				

=== Elections in the 1990s ===
General Election June 1996: Patuakhali-1
Party	Candidate	Votes	%	±%
AL	Shahjahan Mia	63,951	47.3	+1.3
BNP	Mohammad Keramat Ali	52,369	38.8	−7.2
IOJ	Md. A. Goni	10,328	7.6	+4.8
JP(E)	ABM Ruhul Amin Howlader	5,332	3.9	+1.7
Jamaat	A. Zabbar Azadi	2,043	1.5	−0.6
Gano Forum	Abdul Aziz	331	0.2	N/A
Zaker Party	A. Aziz Shing	329	0.2	−0.5
Bangladesh Krisak Sramik Janata Party	Razzak Mridha	294	0.2	N/A
Jatiya Janata Party (Asad)	J. M. Anisur Rahman	126	0.1	N/A
Majority		11,582	8.6	+3.0
Turnout		135,103	62.0	+25.3
AL gain from BNP				

General Election 1991: Patuakhali-1
Party	Candidate	Votes	%	±%
BNP	Mohammad Keramat Ali	51,278	46.0	
AL	Shahjahan Mia	45,006	40.3	
IOJ	A. F. Md. Shahjahan	3,070	2.8	
Bangladesh Janata Party	A. K. M. Ashikur Rahman	2,756	2.5	
JP(E)	Sardar Abdur Rashid	2,468	2.2	
Jamaat	S. K. Zabbar Azadi	2,383	2.1	
Jatiya Oikkya Front	Abdur Razzak Chowdhury	2,324	2.1	
Zaker Party	A. Bari	805	0.7	
Independent	Abdul Aziz Mollik	775	0.7	
JSD	Habibur Rahman Shawkat	557	0.5	
Pragotishi Jatiatabadi Dal (Nurul A Moula)	Md. Selim Talukdar	131	0.1	
Majority		6,272	5.6	
Turnout		111,553	36.7	
BNP gain from JP(E)				
