= Akhtaruzzaman Alamgir =

Bangladeshi politician

Member of the Bangladesh Parliament for Patuakhali-1
- In office 2 April 1979 – 24 March 1982
- Preceded by: Asmat Ali Sikder
- Succeeded by: Sardar Abdur Rashid

Personal details
- Party: Bangladesh Nationalist Party

Akhtaruzzaman Alamgir is a Bangladesh Nationalist Party politician and a former member of parliament for Patuakhali-1.

== Career ==
Alamgir was elected to parliament from Patuakhali-1 as a Bangladesh Nationalist Party candidate in 1979.
