= Kalmegha Union =

Kalmegha Union কালমেঘা ইউনিয়ন
- Location of Kalmegha Union in Bangladesh
- Coordinates: 24.2796°N 90.1009°E
- Country: Bangladesh
- Division: Dhaka Division
- District: Tangail District
- Upazila: Sakhipur Upazila
- Established on: 2011

Government
  - Type: Union Council
  - Chairman: Golam Kibria Selim (Bangladesh Awami League)

Area
  - Total: 20.46 km^{2} (7.90 sq mi)
- Elevation: 22 m (72 ft)

Population (2011)
  - Total: 49,885
  - Density: 2,438/km^{2} (6,315/sq mi)
- Time zone: UTC+6 (BST)
- Postal code: 1950
- Website: kalmeghaup.tangail.gov.bd

Kalmegha Union (Bengali: কালমেঘা ইউনিয়ন) is a union of Sakhipur Upazila, Tangail District, Bangladesh. It was established in 2011.

== See also ==
- Union Councils of Tangail District
