= Syed Ziaul Ahsan =

Pakistani politician (1917–1967)

- সৈয়দ জিয়াউল আহসান

Deputy Speaker of the East Pakistan Provincial Assembly
- In office 27 September 1958 – 7 October 1958
- Preceded by: Shahed Ali Patwary
- Succeeded by: Gamiruddin Pradhan; Md. Moshihul Azam Khan

Personal details
- Born: Syed Abu Naser Ziaul Ahsan; 1917 Backergunge District, Bengal Presidency, British India
- Died: 14 November 1967 (aged 49–50) Dacca, East Pakistan, Pakistan
- Citizenship: Pakistan
- Party: AL
- Relatives: Qamarul Ahsan (brother)

Syed Abu Naser Ziaul Ahsan was an East Pakistani politician from Nazimuddin Road of Old Dhaka. He was a member of the Syed zamindar family from Bamna Upazila. Ahsan was born in 1917. In the 1954 East Bengal Legislative Assembly election, he contested as an independent candidate and won. Later, he joined the East Pakistan Awami League. On 26 September 1958, Shahed Ali Patwary, Deputy Speaker of the East Pakistan Provincial Assembly, passed away. The following day, Ahsan was appointed Acting Deputy Speaker until a new Speaker was elected. Due to illness, he died on 14 November 1967 at Dacca Medical College.
