= Gazaria Union =

Gazaria Union গজারিয়া ইউনিয়ন
- Location of Gazaria Union in Bangladesh
- Coordinates: 24.310280°N 90.210384°E
- Country: Bangladesh
- Division: Dhaka Division
- District: Tangail District
- Upazila: Sakhipur Upazila
- Established on: 1984

Government
  - Type: Union Council
  - Chairman: Abdus Samad (Bangladesh Awami League)

Area
  - Total: 25.33 km^{2} (9.78 sq mi)
- Elevation: 14 m (46 ft)

Population (2011)
  - Total: 38,120
  - Density: 1,505/km^{2} (3,898/sq mi)
- Time zone: UTC+6 (BST)
- Postal code: 1950
- Website: gajariaup.tangail.gov.bd

Gazaria Union (গজারিয়া ইউনিয়ন) is a union of Sakhipur Upazila, Tangail District, Bangladesh. It is situated 44 km east of Tangail, The District Headquarter.

== Demographics ==
According to Population Census 2011 performed by Bangladesh Bureau of Statistics, The total population of Gazaria union is 38120.There are 10884 households in total.

== Education ==
The literacy rate of Gazaria Union is 40.8% (Male-44.8%, Female-37.3%).

== See also ==
- Union Councils of Tangail District
