= Barguna =

District headquarters in Barisal Division, Bangladesh

Barguna বরগুনা
- Town & District headquarter
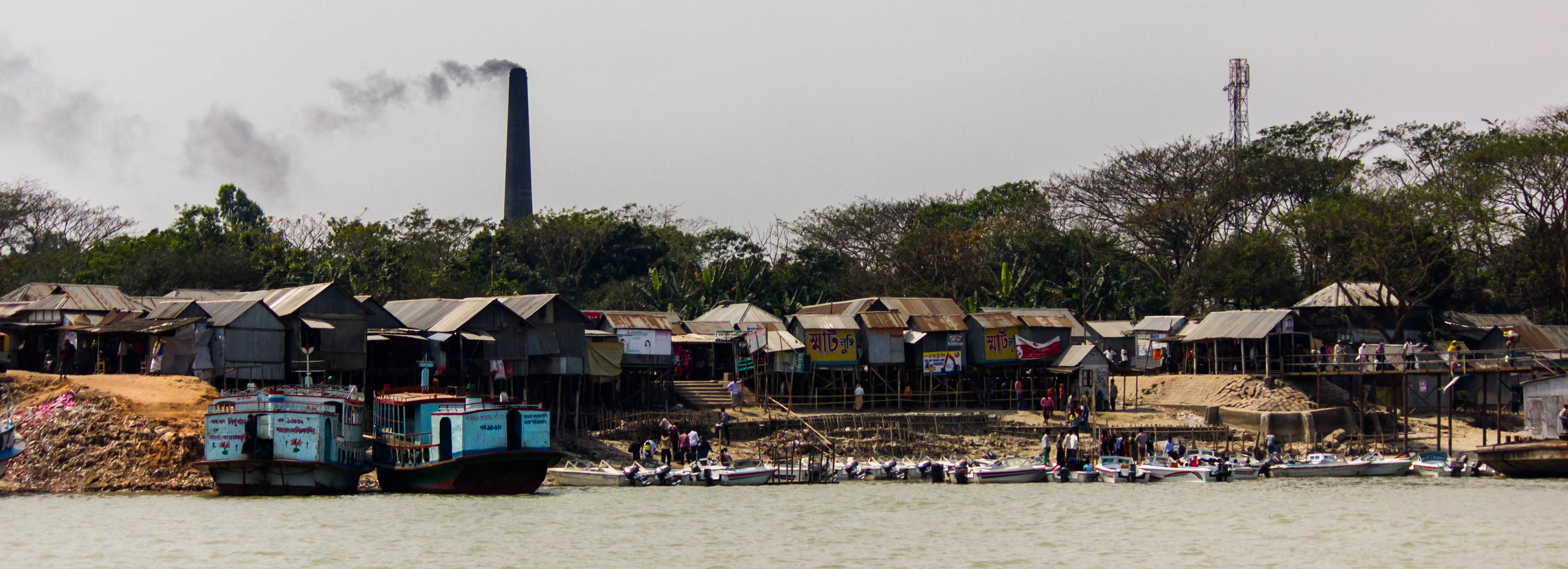
- Barguna coastal area, Bangladesh

- Location in Bangladesh Barguna (Bangladesh)
- Country: Bangladesh
- Division: Barisal Division
- District: Barguna District
- Municipality Eshtablished: 23 July 1973

Area
  - Total: 45.57 km^{2} (17.59 sq mi)

Population (2022)
  - Total: 190,235
  - Density: 4,175/km^{2} (10,810/sq mi)
- Time zone: UTC+6 (BST)
- Postal code: 8700
- Website: bargunamunicipality.org.bd

Barguna (Bengali: বরগুনা) is a town in Barguna district in southern Bangladesh. It is the administrative headquarters and the largest town of Barguna district and a part of Barisal Division. Located on the bank of Khakdon river, the town covers an area of 45.57 square kilometres (17.59 sq mi) with a population of 130235 according to the 2022 census.

== History ==
=== Etymology ===
There are different opinions about the origin of the name "Barguna". The general belief is that the name is derived from Bengali name "Baragun" meaning high tide. The remote past wood traders from the northern region had to wait here for Baragun (high tide) to pull their boats against strong current of the Khakdon river. While others say, Barguna was named after an eminent Magh people who settled there at the very beginning of the habitation. As to the concept of history and folk, Barguna was named the official name likely in 1871, through the creation of a Patuakhali subdivision under then Bakerganj District (present Barisal).

=== Mughal period ===
Historians found that in the thirteenth century there was no trace of plantation in the region. The entire region was then full of jungle and along the riverside in Sundarbans. However, in the early fourteenth century, people started settling here for cultivation. It was then a part of Bakla-Chandradwip kingdom. The inhabitants of the region faced repeated attacks from the Maghs and Portuguese pirates. Umed Khan son of Shaista Khan saved the inhabitants from the Maghs repression and established the absolute authority of the emperor Aurangzeb. The emperor was pleased with him and awarded him to rule the state of Bakla-Chandradwip which Barguna was part of it. It is said that during the reign of Nawab Ali Vardi Khan, a group of Rakhine people settled permanently in Baliatoli near the present town, clearing the bushes and jungles and starting cultivation there.

=== British period ===
Barguna was a resumed Sundarbans estate almost entirely reclaimed from forest. It was resumed by an order of the Presidency Commissioner dated the 25 July 1856. It was claimed by the Nawab of Dacca as belonging to Aila-Fuljhuri, but was ultimately decreed to Government by the Privy Council in 1870. It was the key to the Sundarbans and was the healthiest of the Sundarbans estates. There was a Khas Mahal Tashil cutchari under the supervision of a Sub-Deputy Collector (Circle Officer).

Barguna thana (police station) was established in 1904 and became the first administrative unit of the town. With the influx of population from the districts of Dhaka, Faridpur and Barisal a good market, a middle English school, a post office and a charitable dispensary were gradually established and trading firms opened up business.

=== Present history ===
Barguna was elevated to a sub-division in 1969 during the formation of Barisal District during the East Pakistan period. After the formation of Bangladesh, the sub-division was upgraded to a district in 1984 under Hussain Muhammad Ershad's decentralization programme and Barguna became the headquarters of Barguna district.

== Demographics ==
Religions in Barguna (2022)
Religion	Percent
Islam	81.65%
Hinduism	18.25%
Other or not stated	0.10%

At the time of the 2022 census, Barguna had 22,353 households and a population of 190,235. Barguna has a literacy rate of 79.90% and a sex ratio of 931 females per 1000 males.

== Points of interest ==
- Nathpotty Lake
- Payra River
- Artist Konu's Artshop
- Barguna Town Hall
- Freedom Fighters Memorial Monument.

== Sports ==
Cricket and football are the two most popular sports in Barguna while local games like Kabaddi, Kho kho, Lathi Khela are also popular. There is a local stadium in the town known as Barguna District Stadium. It is used for hosting local sports and national events.

== Administration ==
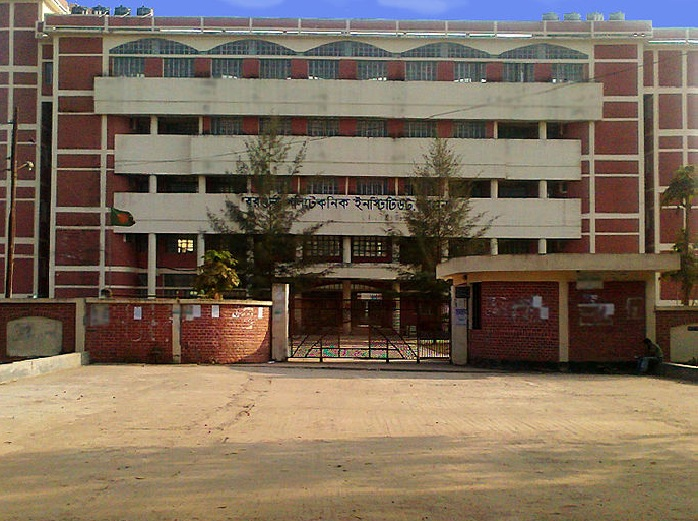
Barguna Polytechnic Institute

Barguna municipality was established on 23 July 1973. The municipality is administrated by 9 councilors, 3 woman councilors and the mayor elected by the local government election which sits in the office for a five-year tenure.

== Transport and communications ==
The main transport systems used in the town are cycle, rickshaws, auto rickshaws, buses, micro-buses and cars. Barguna can be reached by road and waterways. There is a bus station and a launch terminal in the town which maintains communication with the other districts of the country. There is no railway in this region.

== Education ==
Barguna town is a home to many educational institutions. Barguna Zilla School is the oldest school in the town established in 1927 as Barguna Middle English School by Mr. Ramzan Ali Akon. Notable schools and colleges include Barguna Government College, Barguna Government Women's College, Barguna Zilla School, Barguna Govt. Girls High School, Gourichanna Nawab Salimullah Secondary School etc. Besides these, there are two teacher training colleges, a Government Polytechnic institute, a technical school and college and a textile vocational institute in the town. The educational activities are operated under the Board of Intermediate and Secondary Education, Barisal.

== Media ==
Print media: Prothom Alo (National), The Daily Kaler kantho (National), Daily Samakal (National), Dainik News (National)

Telecommunications: Teletalk, Airtel, BTCL, BanglaLink, Grameen Phone, Robi etc.
