= Betagi Upazila =

Administrative division in Bangladesh

Betagi বেতাগী
- Upazila
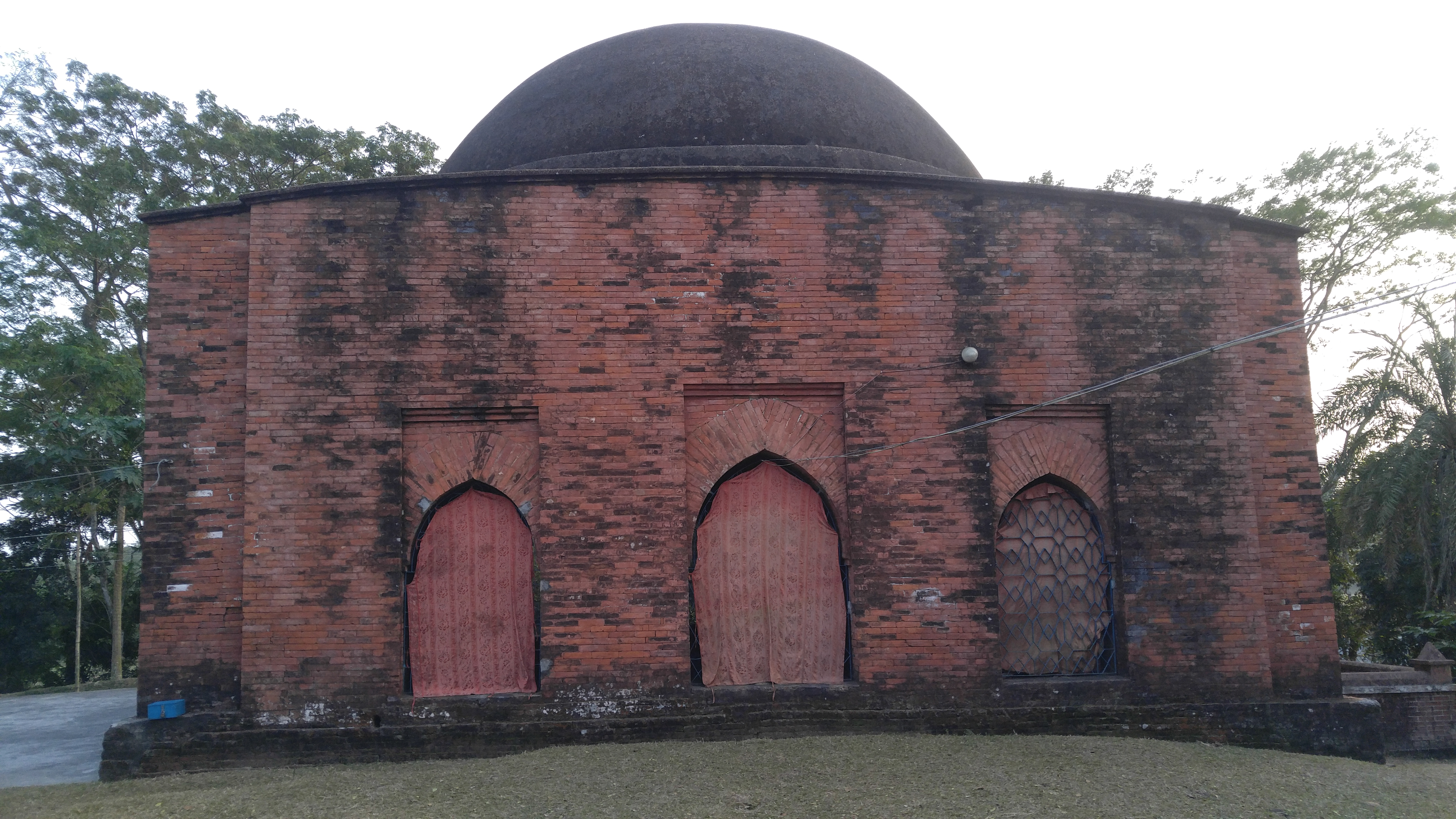
- Bibi Chini Shahi Mosque, Betagi

- Coordinates: 22°25′N 90°10.1′E
- Country: Bangladesh
- Division: Barisal Division
- District: Barguna District

Area
  - Total: 167.75 km^{2} (64.77 sq mi)

Population (2022)
  - Total: 125,472
  - Density: 747.97/km^{2} (1,937.2/sq mi)
- Time zone: UTC+6 (BST)
- Postal code: 8740
- Website: Official Map of the Betagi Upazila

Betagi Upazila mauza geocode map

Betagi (Bengali: বেতাগী) is an upazila of Barguna District in Barisal Division, Bangladesh.

== Geography ==
Betagi is located at 22.4167°N 90.1681°E. It has 22,156 households and a total area of 167.75 km^{2}.

== Demographics ==
Religions in Betagi Upazila (2022)
Religion	Percent
Islam	90.75%
Hinduism	9.09%
Other or not stated	0.16%

According to the 2022 Bangladeshi census, Betagi Upazila had 31,209 households and a population of 125,472. 8.22% of the population was under 5 years of age. Betagi had a literacy rate (age 7 and over) of 82.50%: 84.93% for males and 80.22% for females, and a sex ratio of 94.57 males for every 100 females. 15,828 (12.61%) lived in urban areas.

According to the 2011 Census of Bangladesh, Betagi Upazila had a population of 117,145 living in 27,922 households. 25,857 (22.07%) were under 10 years of age. Betagi has a literacy rate (age 7 and over) of 60.1%, compared to the national average of 51.8%, and a sex ratio of 1067 females per 1000 males. 12,786 (10.91%) lived in urban areas.

According to the 1991 Bangladesh census, Betagi had a population of 110,926. Males constitute 49.95% of the population, and females 50.05%. The population aged 18 or over was 57,885. Betagi had an average literacy rate of 87% (7+ years), compared to the national average of 72.4%.

== Administration ==
UNO: Md. Saddam Hossen

Betagi Upazila is divided into Betagi Municipality and seven union parishads: Betagi, Bibichini, Buramazumdar, Hosnabad, Kazirabad, Mokamia, and Sarishamuri. The union parishads are subdivided into 59 mauzas and 73 villages.

Betagi Municipality is subdivided into 9 wards and 9 mahallas.

== Education ==
=== Primary schools ===
- Masuakhali Government Primary School
- Betagi Model Government Primary School
- Jingabariya Government Primary School

=== High schools ===
- Mokamia Secondary School
- Betagi Government Pilot High School
- Betagi Girls' School and College
- Kaialghata High School
- Kaunia Emdadia Secondary School

=== Colleges ===
- Betagi Government Degree College
- Betagi Girls' School and College

== Notable people ==
- Shahjada Abdul Malek Khan, MP

== See also ==
- Upazilas of Bangladesh
- Districts of Bangladesh
- Divisions of Bangladesh
- Administrative geography of Bangladesh
