= Matarbari =

Matarbari may refer to:

- Matarbari Port, a port in Bangladesh
- Matarbari Island, an island in the Bay of Bengal
- Matarbari Power Plant, a power plant in Bangladesh
- Matarbari Assembly constituency, an Assembly constituency in Tripura
