= M. A. Jabbar =

Bangladeshi politician (1932–2020)

- এম এ জব্বার

Member of Parliament for Pirojpur-4
- In office 7 May 1986 – 15 April 1988
- Preceded by: Position created
- Succeeded by: Manirul Islam

Member of Parliament for Pirojpur-3
- In office 15 April 1988 – 6 December 1990
- Preceded by: Anwar Hossain Manju
- Succeeded by: Mohiuddin Ahmed
- In office 19 March 1996 – 30 March 1996
- Succeeded by: Rustum Ali Faraji

Personal details
- Born: 30 November 1932 Pirojpur District, Bengal Presidency, British India
- Died: 18 August 2020 (aged 87) Florida, United States
- Party: Jatiya Party (Ershad)

M. A. Jabbar (30 November 1932 – 18 August 2020) was a Jatiya Party politician and a Jatiya Sangsad member representing the Pirojpur-3 and Pirojpur-4 constituencies.

In February 2015, Jabbar was sentenced to life imprisonment on the conviction of four charges of crimes against humanity and genocide committed during the Bangladesh War of Independence.

== Early life and career ==
Jabbar earned his bachelor's in engineering degree and joined the politics of Muslim League. He was elected an MPA in 1964. He was elected to the parliament from Pirojpur-4 as a Jatiya Party candidate in 1986. Jabbar was elected to the parliament from Pirojpur-3 as a Jatiya Party candidate in 1988.

=== War crimes and convictions ===
According to the International Crimes Tribunal prosecution, while Jabbar was serving as the chairman of Mathbaria Peace Committee, he played a key role in the formation of the Razakar force and led it to commit war crimes. They brought five charges against him for killing, mass killing, looting and forced conversions in Pirojpur in 1971:

- Killing two freedom fighters at Mathbaria's Phuljhuri during the Liberation War. Torching and ransacking of over 100 houses at Nathparha and Kuluparha in Pirojpur.
- Killing a man at Phuljhuri, setting fire to 360 houses before looting them.
- Killing 11 people at Pirojpur's Noli village, looting and setting fire to 60 houses there.
- Forced conversion of 200 Hindus at Phuljhuri.
- Detaining 37 people from Angulkata and Mathbaria, killing 22 of them and seriously injuring others.

In May 2014, an arrest warrant was issued against Jabbar. According to the investigators, he had resided in the United States in his later life.
