= Bihanga (disambiguation) =

Bihanga is a settlement in Ibanda District, Uganda.

Bihanga may also refer to:

- Bihanga Military Training School, Bihanga, Uganda - see List of military schools in Uganda
- Bihanga Island, Barguna District, Bangladesh
- Bihanga, a 1999 film by Abdullah al Mamun
- Bihanga, the inflight magazine of Biman Bangladesh Airlines

== See also ==
- Bihangal, a village in Barishal Division, Bangladesh
