= Pirojpur-3 =

Bangladeshi parliamentary constituency

Coordinates: 22.29°N 89.96°E

- Constituency for the Jatiya Sangsad
- District: Pirojpur District
- Division: Barisal Division
- Electorate: 241,361 (2026)

Current constituency
- Created: 1984
- Party: Bangladesh Nationalist Party
- Member: Ruhul Amin Dulal
- ← 128 Pirojpur-2 130 Tangail-1 →

Pirojpur-3 is a constituency represented in the Jatiya Sangsad (National Parliament) of Bangladesh since 2026 by Ruhul Amin Dulal of the Bangladesh Nationalist Party.

== Boundaries ==
The constituency encompasses Mathbaria Upazila.

== History ==
The constituency was created in 1984 from a Bakerganj constituency when the former Bakerganj District was split into four districts: Bhola, Bakerganj, Jhalokati, and Pirojpur.

Ahead of the 2008 general election, the Election Commission redrew constituency boundaries to reflect population changes revealed by the 2001 Bangladesh census. The 2008 redistricting altered the boundaries of the constituency.

Ahead of the 2014 general election, the Election Commission reduced the boundaries of the constituency. Previously it had also included one union parishad of Bhandaria Upazila: Telikhali.

== Members of Parliament ==
Election	Member	Party
1986	Anwar Hossain Manju	Jatiya Party
1988	M. A. Jabbar	Jatiya Party
1991	Mohiuddin Ahmed	Bangladesh Krishak Sramik Awami League
Feb 1996	M. A. Jabbar	Bangladesh Nationalist Party
Jun 1996	Rustum Ali Faraji	Jatiya Party
2001	Rustum Ali Faraji	Bangladesh Nationalist Party
2008	Anwar Hossain	Awami League
2014	Rustum Ali Faraji	Independent
2018	Rustum Ali Faraji	Jatiya Party (Ershad)
2024	Shamim Shahnawaz	Independent
2026	Ruhul Amin Dulal	Bangladesh Nationalist Party

== Elections ==
=== Elections in the 2020s ===
General Election 2026: Pirojpur-3
Party	Candidate	Votes	%	±%
BNP	Ruhul Amin Dulal	63,791	46.6	N/A
NCP	Md. Shamim Hamidi	36,616	26.7	N/A
IAB	Md. Rustum Ali Faraji	35,968	26.3	N/A
Independent	Tauhiduzzaman	231	0.2	N/A
BJSD	Karim Sikdar	212	0.2	N/A
JP(E)	Md. Mashreful Azam	169	0.1	N/A
Majority		27,175	19.9	N/A
Turnout		136,987	56.8	N/A
BNP gain from Independent				

=== Elections in the 2010s ===
General Election 2014: Pirojpur-3
Party	Candidate	Votes	%	±%
Independent	Rustum Ali Faraji	29,342	53.4	+29.2
AL	Anwar Hossain	25,409	46.2	+2.6
Independent	Rama Rani	234	0.4	N/A
Majority		3,933	7.2	−12.2
Turnout		54,985	32.5	−52.5
Independent gain from AL				

=== Elections in the 2000s ===
General Election 2008: Pirojpur-3
Party	Candidate	Votes	%	±%
AL	Anwar Hossain	59,420	43.6	+17.0
Independent	Rustum Ali Faraji	33,008	24.2	N/A
BNP	Md. Shahajahan Meah	31,602	23.2	−34.9
IAB	Shafi Mahamud Talukder	12,237	9.0	N/A
Majority		26,412	19.4	−12.1
Turnout		136,267	85.0	+14.7
AL gain from BNP				

General Election 2001: Pirojpur-3
Party	Candidate	Votes	%	±%
BNP	Rustom Ali Faraji	64,958	58.1	+32.7
AL	Mahamuda Shawgat	29,756	26.6	−3.7
Jatiya Party (M)	Anwar Hossain Manju	11,565	10.3	N/A
IJOF	Shafi Mahamud Talukder	5,051	4.5	N/A
Independent	Sudhir Ranjan Biswas	227	0.2	+0.1
CPB	Bimolendu Halder	102	0.1	N/A
BKA	Md. Abdul Latif Siraji	88	0.1	N/A
Majority		35,202	31.5	+24.5
Turnout		111,747	70.3	+0.5
BNP gain from JP(E)				

=== Elections in the 1990s ===
General Election June 1996: Pirojpur-3
Party	Candidate	Votes	%	±%
JP(E)	Rustum Ali Faraji	29,837	37.3	+3.7
AL	Mohiuddin Ahmed	24,263	30.3	N/A
BNP	M. A. Jabbar	20,326	25.4	+12.9
Jamaat	Nur Mohammed Akon	4,915	6.1	N/A
Zaker Party	Abdullah Mmin Faridi	350	0.4	−0.8
Islamic Sashantantrik Andolan	Md. Zaharul Haque	227	0.3	N/A
Independent	Sudhir Ranjan Biswas	50	0.1	N/A
Majority		5,574	7.0	+4.3
Turnout		79,968	69.8	+21.9
JP(E) gain from Bangladesh Krishak Sramik Awami League (1983–1991)				

General Election 1991: Pirojpur-3
Party	Candidate	Votes	%	±%
Bangladesh Krishak Sramik Awami League (1983–1991)	Mohiuddin Ahmed	26,813	36.3	
JP(E)	M. A. Jabbar	24,844	33.6	
Independent	Nur Mohammed Akon	10,958	14.8	
BNP	Krishibid M A Samad	9,214	12.5	
Bangladesh Janata Party	Abul Bashar	1,014	1.4	
Zaker Party	Md. Anwar Hossain Farazi	876	1.2	
Independent	A. Salam	130	0.2	
Jatiya Samajtantrik Dal-JSD	Md. Afzal Hossain	68	0.1	
Majority		1,969	2.7	
Turnout		73,917	47.9	
Bangladesh Krishak Sramik Awami League (1983–1991) gain from JP(E)				
