= Cox's Bazar-2 =

Constituency of Bangladesh's Jatiya Sangsad

Coordinates: 21.52°N 91.96°E

- Constituency for the Jatiya Sangsad
- District: Cox's Bazar District
- Division: Chittagong Division
- Electorate: 296,177 (2018)

Current constituency
- Created: 1984
- Party: Bangladesh Nationalist Party
- Member: Alamgir Mohammad Mahfuzullah Farid
- ← 294 Cox's Bazar-1 296 Cox's Bazar-3 →

Cox's Bazar-2 is a constituency represented in the Jatiya Sangsad (National Parliament) of Bangladesh since 2026 by Alamgir Mohammad Mahfuzullah Farid of the Bangladesh Nationalist Party.

== Boundaries ==
The constituency encompasses Kutubdia and Maheshkhali upazilas.

== History ==
The constituency was created in 1984 from a Chittagong constituency when the former Chittagong District was split into two districts: Chittagong and Cox's Bazar.

== Members of Parliament ==
Election	Member	Party
1986	Jahirul Islam	Jatiya Party
1991	Md. Ishak	Bangladesh Krishak Sramik Awami League
Feb 1996	ATM Nurul Bashar Chowdhury	Bangladesh Nationalist Party
Jun 1996	Alamgir Mohammad Mahfuzullah Farid	Bangladesh Nationalist Party
2008	A. H. M. Hamidur Rahman Azad	Bangladesh Jamaat-e-Islami
2014	Asheq Ullah Rafiq	Awami League
2026	Alamgir Mohammad Mahfuzullah Farid	Bangladesh Nationalist Party

== Elections ==
=== Elections in the 2010s ===
Asheq Ullah Rafiq was elected unopposed in the 2014 general election after opposition parties withdrew their candidacies in a boycott of the election.

=== Elections in the 2000s ===
General Election 2008: Cox's Bazar-2
Party	Candidate	Votes	%	±%
Jamaat	A. H. M. Hamidur Rahman Azad	104,271	53.9	N/A
AL	Ansarul Karim	86,944	45.0	+12.9
IOJ	Mohammad Solaiman	1,335	0.7	N/A
Gano Front	Golam Mowla	467	0.2	N/A
Zaker Party	Mohammad Elias	340	0.2	N/A
Majority		17,327	9.0	−26.5
Turnout		193,357	85.6	+13.9
Jamaat gain from BNP				

General Election 2001: Cox's Bazar-2
Party	Candidate	Votes	%	±%
BNP	Alamgir Mohammad Mahfuzullah Farid	103,503	67.6	+26.8
AL	Faridul Islam Chowdhury	49,190	32.1	+2.3
Independent	A. N. M. Shahid Uddin	426	0.3	N/A
Majority		54,313	35.5	+24.5
Turnout		153,119	71.7	+1.8
BNP hold				

=== Elections in the 1990s ===
General Election June 1996: Cox's Bazar-2
Party	Candidate	Votes	%	±%
BNP	Alamgir Mohammad Mahfuzullah Farid	44,445	40.8	+15.7
AL	Sirajul Mostafa	32,443	29.8	N/A
Jamaat	Master Shafiullah Kutubi	21,859	20.0	−8.5
JP(E)	Jahirul Islam	5,793	5.3	−0.1
IOJ	Moulana Amjad Ali	3,683	3.4	N/A
Samridhya Bangladesh Andolan	Shamim Ara Dulan	604	0.6	N/A
Gano Forum	A. K. M. Faijul Karim	198	0.2	N/A
Majority		12,002	11.0	+8.1
Turnout		109,025	69.9	+21.7
BNP gain from Bangladesh Krishak Sramik Awami League (1983–1991)				

General Election 1991: Cox's Bazar-2
Party	Candidate	Votes	%	±%
Bangladesh Krishak Sramik Awami League (1983–1991)	Md. Ishak B A	25,727	31.4	
Jamaat	Shafi Ullah	23,345	28.5	
BNP	Md. Rashid	20,563	25.1	
BIF	Md. Shafiqul Alam	5,747	7.0	
JP(E)	Shaker Ullah	4,461	5.4	
NDP	Mostak Ahmed Chowdhury	1,862	2.3	
Independent	Sirajul Mostafa	101	0.1	
Independent	Md. Nur Boks	100	0.1	
Majority		2,382	2.9	
Turnout		81,906	48.2	
Bangladesh Krishak Sramik Awami League (1983–1991) gain from JP(E)				
