= Haringhata forest =

Forest in Bangladesh

Haringhata Forest
- IUCN category IV (habitat/species management area)
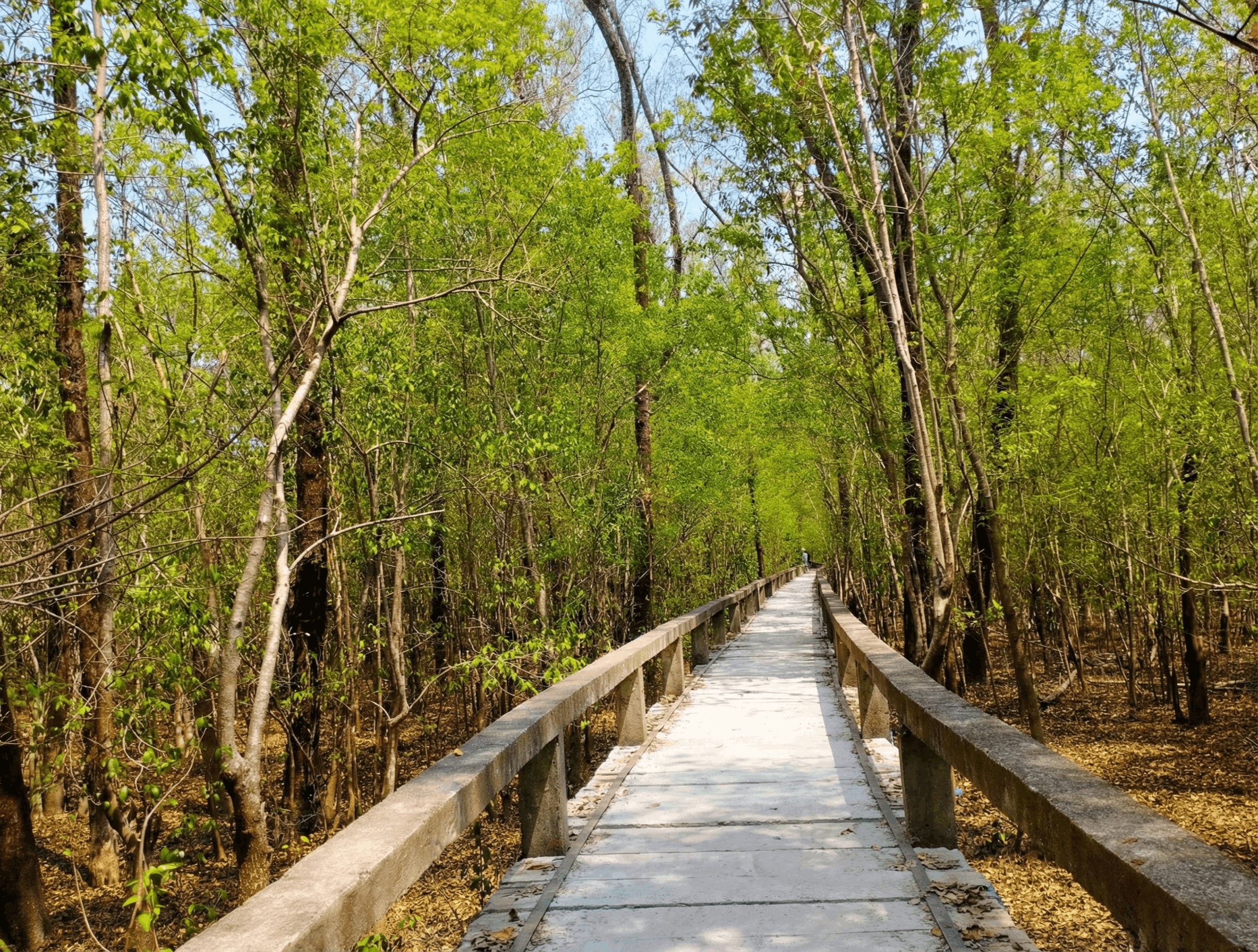
- An elevated concrete walkway extends through the mangrove canopy of Haringhata Forest.

- Location within Bangladesh
- Location: Patharghata Upazila, Barguna District, Barisal Division, Bangladesh
- Nearest city: Barguna
- Coordinates: 21.82°N 89.98°E
- Area: 3,685 acres (14.91 km^{2}; 1,491 ha)
- Designation: Wildlife sanctuary / Eco-park
- Established: 2011 (Eco-park designation)
- Governing body: Bangladesh Forest Department

Haringhata Forest (হরিণঘাটা বন), also spelt Horinghata, is a mangrove forest and designated eco-park located in Patharghata Upazila of Barguna District in southern Bangladesh. Situated at the confluence of the Baleshwar River and the Bishkhali River near the Bay of Bengal, the forest covers approximately 3,685 acres (14.91 km^{2}; 1,491 ha) under the Patharghata Forest Range of the Patuakhali Coastal Forest Division. The forest originated from a coastal afforestation programme begun in 1967 by the Bangladesh Forest Department, primarily using Sonneratia apetala (Keora) to stabilise newly accreted mudflats and to serve as a greenbelt against cyclonic storm surges. Over subsequent decades the plantation underwent natural ecological succession, developing into a complex mangrove ecosystem that supports a large population of chital (spotted deer), estimated at approximately 5,000 individuals. The toponym Haringhata (হরিণঘাটা) translates from Bengali as "the riverbank of the deer". In 2011 the Bangladesh government designated the area as an eco-park to promote regulated ecotourism.

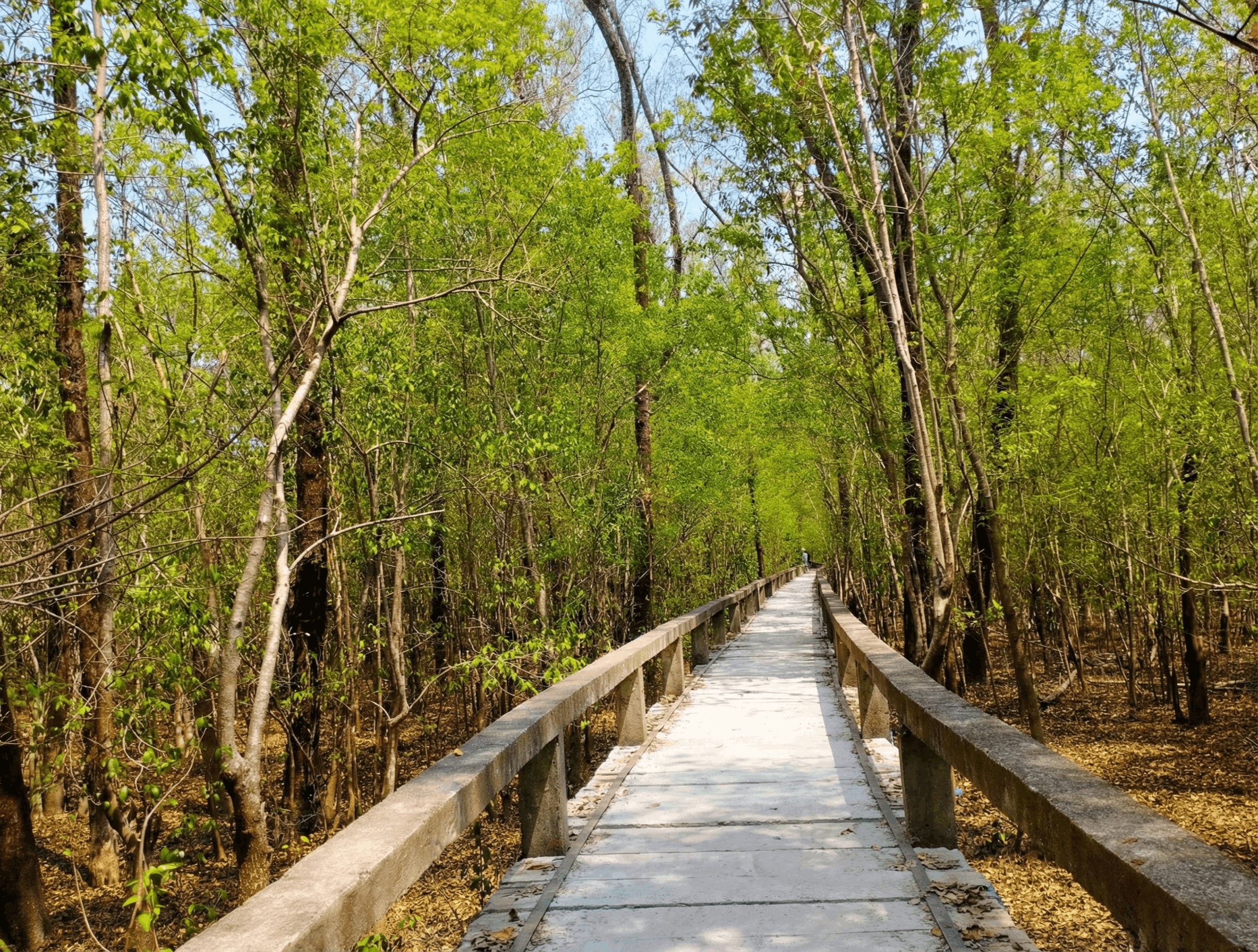
An elevated concrete walkway extends straight through the lush, dense greenery of Haringhata Forest.

== Geography ==
Haringhata Forest occupies the estuarine zone where the Baleshwar and Bishkhali rivers converge before entering the Bay of Bengal. The Baleshwar River forms the western boundary of both Barguna District and the forest; it functions as the terminal reach of the Gorai–Madhumati distributary system, which carries freshwater from the Ganges into the lower Bengal delta. The Bishkhali River lies to the east, enclosing Patharghata Upazila on its seaward side.

Hydrological studies of the Ganges–Brahmaputra–Meghna delta indicate that the Baleshwar channel at this latitude has a relatively shallow average depth of 4 to 5 metres (13 to 16 ft) during the monsoon season, whereas the Bishkhali–Burishwar system exceeds 18 metres (59 ft) in average depth with higher current velocities. The shallower Baleshwar carries a higher concentration of suspended sediment; as this sediment-laden flow meets tidal resistance from the bay, rapid deposition occurs, generating new mudflats along the forest's southern and western edges. Prominent accreted landforms include Laldia Char and the adjacent Padma beach zone, which provide substrate for pioneer mangrove colonisation and contribute to the forest's gradual southward expansion.

The formally gazetted Haringhata Forest Beat encompasses 3,000 acres (12 km^{2}; 1,200 ha) of the original legacy plantation. However, continued sediment accretion and additional planting on newly formed chars have expanded the contiguous forested area; regional forestry officials and media reports cite the total functional forest zone at 15,000 to 20,000 acres (61 to 81 km^{2}; 6,100 to 8,100 ha).

== Biodiversity ==
=== Flora ===
The initial afforestation programme planted Sonneratia apetala (Keora) almost exclusively, selected for its tolerance of fluctuating salinity and unconsolidated substrates. As the Keora stands matured, their root systems trapped additional sediment, raising the land elevation and reducing tidal inundation frequency. This facilitated secondary succession: species such as Excoecaria agallocha (Gewa), Heritiera fomes (Sundari), Bruguiera spp., and Avicennia spp. colonised the understorey and canopy through waterborne seed dispersal from the adjacent Sundarbans. Between 2013 and 2016, the Forest Department undertook enrichment planting under a government-funded initiative, adding 100 to 200 hectares (250 to 490 acres) of new mangrove and Casuarina equisetifolia (Jhau) plantation, particularly on Laldia Char and along sandy beach margins.

A 2022 botanical survey formally catalogued the vascular flora of the Barguna coastal mangrove ecosystem, documenting the Haringhata Forest Beat as a distinct unit within the Patharghata Range with an area of 3,000 acres (1,200 ha).

=== Fauna ===
The forest's principal faunal attraction is a large, free-ranging population of chital (Axis axis), estimated at approximately 5,000 individuals by the Patuakhali regional forest division. Because the forest is separated from the core Bengal tiger habitats of the Sundarbans by wide river channels, the deer population experiences minimal large-carnivore predation. Other recorded mammals include wild boar (Sus scrofa), rhesus macaque (Macaca mulatta), jungle cat (Felis chaus), and small civets.

The mangrove environment supports populations of water monitor (Varanus salvator) and Bengal monitor (Varanus bengalensis), which serve as the principal meso-predators and scavengers in the ecosystem.

Field surveys and ecotourism reports document 35 to 50 species of resident and migratory birds in and around the forest, including red junglefowl (Gallus gallus), various kingfishers, and woodpeckers. The southern coastal margin at Laldia Char serves as a foraging and staging area for migratory shorebirds and waterfowl along the Central Asian Flyway during the winter months.

== Tourism ==
The Bangladesh government designated Haringhata Forest as an eco-park in 2011, with formal promotion as a tourist destination beginning around 2015. Infrastructure development has been funded primarily by the Bangladesh Climate Change Trust Fund (BCCTF) under the Ministry of Environment and Forests.

=== Infrastructure ===
The eco-park's central feature is an elevated foot-trail (ফুট ট্রেইল) designed as a raised walkway on reinforced concrete pillars, intended to allow visitor access to the forest canopy without damaging the pneumatophores (breathing roots) of the mangrove trees or disturbing wildlife. The trail has been constructed in phases:

- Phase 1 — 500 metres (1,600 ft) of raised walkway, at a cost of ৳25 million (2.5 crore taka) from climate trust funds.
- Phase 2 — an additional 450 metres (1,480 ft) of pathway.
- Phase 3 — the remaining approximately 2,000 metres (6,600 ft), planned to extend the trail to the Casuarina (Jhau) forests near Laldia beach; this segment remains incomplete.

The master plan envisions a total trail length of 2,950 metres (9,680 ft). Portions of the trail incorporate suspension bridges (ঝুলন্ত সেতু) to span tidal creeks within the forest. Additional facilities include a 60-foot-tall (18 m) observation watchtower, rest houses (বিশ্রামাগার), and circular pavilions (গোলঘর).

=== Conservation concerns ===
Academic studies on the eco-park have identified a tension between the current tourism model and ecological sustainability. Researchers have noted that disruption from unregulated visitor numbers, noise pollution, and infrastructure construction within the mangrove habitat poses behavioural risks to wildlife, particularly the spotted deer, and advocate adoption of a community-based tourism framework with enforced carrying-capacity limits and designated quiet zones.

Illegal logging and poison fishing within the estuarine creeks have been reported as threats to the forest's integrity. In response, the Forest Department has integrated Haringhata into the Spatial Monitoring and Reporting Tool (SMART) patrolling system, funded at approximately ৳21 million (2.10 crore taka) by the BCCTF, equipping forest guards with GPS-based data logging to improve law-enforcement coverage.

=== Cyclone risk ===
Haringhata Forest is exposed to cyclonic storm surges from the Bay of Bengal and functions as a critical coastal buffer. Hydrodynamic modelling of the Barguna coast has estimated that a mature mangrove belt 600 metres (2,000 ft) wide can reduce storm-surge height by up to 0.45 metres (1.5 ft), with the first 133 metres (436 ft) of vegetation absorbing the most energy and reducing surge by 0.18 metres (0.59 ft). During Cyclone Sidr in 2007, the forest served as a physical barrier protecting inland settlements and agricultural polders. However, cyclonic events inflict severe mechanical damage on the standing vegetation, necessitating ongoing replanting programmes by the Forest Department to maintain stem density and protective capacity.

== See also ==
- Sundarbans
- Patharghata Upazila
- Barguna District
- Mangrove
- Cyclone Sidr
