= Matarbari Island =

Island in Bangladesh

- Interactive map of Matarbari Island

Geography
- Location: Moheshkhali Upazila
- Coordinates: 21°45′N 91°54′E

Administration
- Bangladesh

Matarbari Island (Bengali: মাতারবাড়ী দ্বীপ) is an island of Moheshkhali Upazila, of the Cox's Bazar District of Bangladesh.It is being transformed into a hub for power, ports, logistics and manufacturing for Bangladesh.

== Location ==
The island situated at Moheshkhali Upazila in the northwestern part of Cox's Bazar District .

== Effect of climate change ==
Due to rise of sea water level, around 600 families have been displaced by coastal erosion.

== Important places ==
- Matarbari Power Plant
- Matarbari Port
