= Haringhata River =

River in Bangladesh

Coordinates: 21°54′N 89°57′E

The Haringhata River is located in Bangladesh. It is one of the large coastal rivers of the Ganges-Padma system south of the confluence of the Bhola and the Baleshwar, and sets part of the boundary between Bagerhat District and Barguna District before emptying into the Bay of Bengal. The Haringhata flows between Sarankhola Upazila in Bagerhat district, and Patharghata Upazila of Barguna district.
