= Ruhul Amin Dulal =

Bangladeshi politician

Members of Parliament
- Incumbent
- Assumed office 17 February 2026
- Preceded by: Shamim Shahnawaz
- Constituency: Pirojpur-3

Personal details
- Party: Bangladesh Nationalist Party
- Occupation: Politician

Ruhul Amin Dulal is a Bangladeshi politician the Bangladesh Nationalist Party. He was elected as the Member of Parliament for the Pirojpur-3 constituency in the 2026 Bangladeshi general election held on 12 February 2026.
