= Hatem Ali Jamadar =

Bengali politician

Khan Sahib Hatem Ali Jamadar
- হাতেম আলী জমাদ্দার

Member of the East Bengal Legislative Assembly
- In office 1947–1953
- Constituency: Pirojpur South

Member of the Bengal Legislative Assembly
- In office 1937–1947
- Constituency: Pirojpur South

Personal details
- Born: 1872 Mathbaria, Backergunge District, Bengal Presidency
- Died: March 8, 1982 (aged 109–110)
- Party: Krishak Sramik Party

Khan Sahib Hatem Ali Jamadar (Bengali: হাতেম আলী জমাদ্দার; 1872–1982) was a Bengali politician and philanthropist. He served as a member of the Bengal Legislative Assembly and the East Bengal Legislative Assembly.

== Early life ==
Jamadar was born in 1872, to a Bengali Muslim family from the village of Mithakhali in Mathbaria, Firozpur located in the Backergunge District of the Bengal Presidency.

== Career ==
Jamadar attended the Gaurichanna Tenant Coneference in 1930, presided by Hashem Ali Khan, which protested in favour of tenant rights against zamindars. He was also a member of the District Khilafat Committee which supported the pro-Ottoman Khilafat Movement. The British Raj conferred the title of Khan Sahib on him in 1932.

In 1937, Jamadar contested in the Bengal legislative elections as a Krishak Praja Party candidate, and successfully defeated his rival Moulvi Azharuddin Ahmad of the All-India Muslim League. His constituency, Firozpur South, covered Mathbaria, Bhandaria, Kathalia, Bamna and Patharghata. Despite the party struggling to gain support at the 1946 elections as a result of the growing popularity of the Muslim League's Pakistan Movement, Jamadar preserved his Firozpur South seat against Aftabuddin Wakil of the Muslim League. He also won a seat in the East Bengal Provincial Assembly following the 1962 Basic Democracy elections.

Jamadar was the founder of Mathbaria Central Co-operative Bank. In 1968, he founded the Hatem Ali Girls Middle School to provide for the education of women in Mathbaria. He is also the founder of the K. M. Latif Institution.

== Death ==
Jamadar died on 8 March 1982.
