= Badurtala =

Badurtala বাদুরতলা
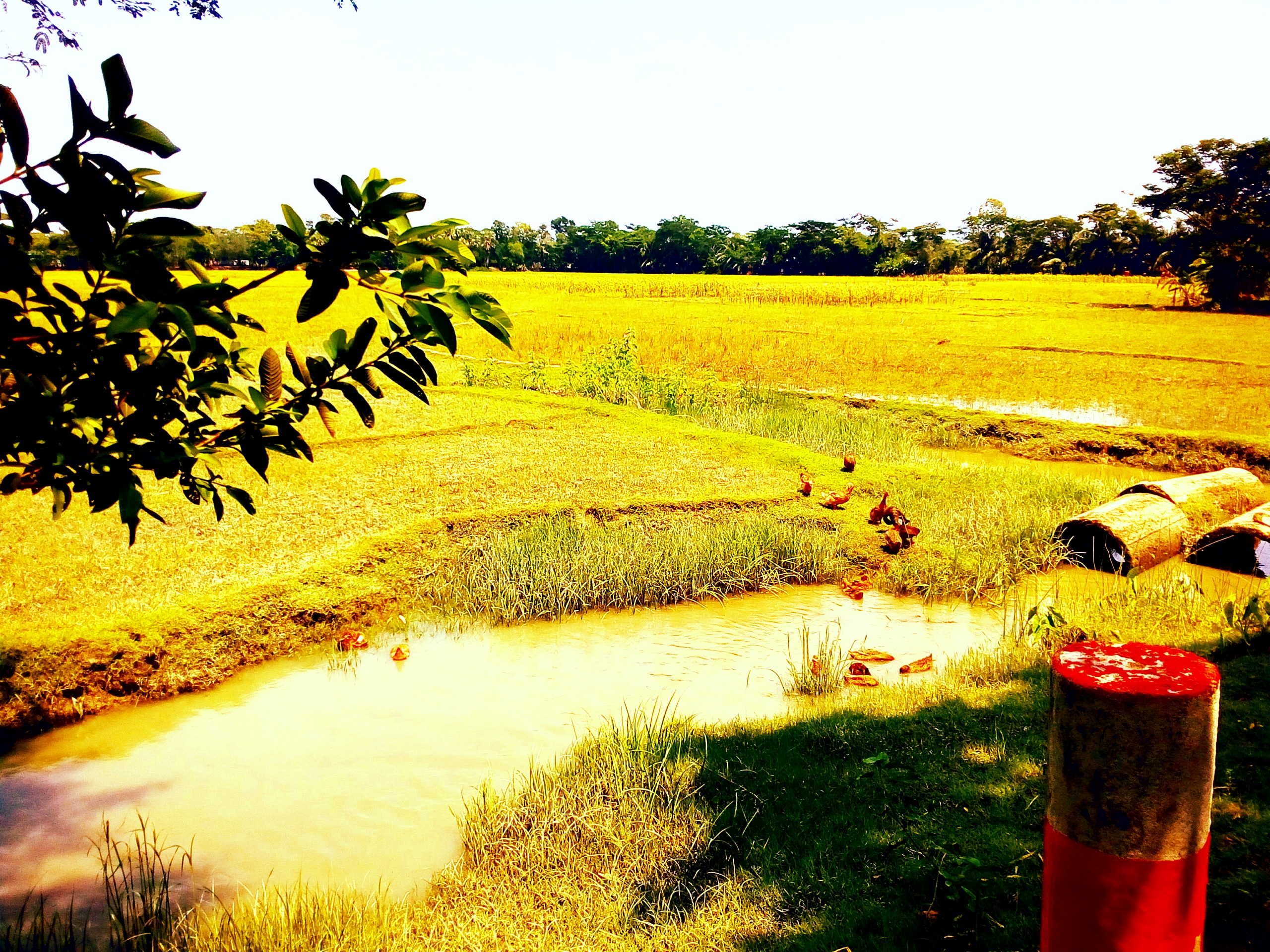
- Skyline of Badurtala.

- Location in Bangladesh
- Coordinates: 23°3′N 90°13′E
- Country: Bangladesh
- Division: Barisal Division
- District: Barisal District
- Upazila: Patharghata Upazila
- Time zone: UTC+6 (Bangladesh Time)

Badurtala is a village of Patharghata Upazila in Barguna District in the Barisal Division of southern-central Bangladesh.
