= Awami League (Mizan) =

Awami League আওয়ামী লীগ
- Abbreviation: AL (Mizan)
- President: Mizanur Rahman Chowdhury
- General Secretary: Muhammad Yusuf Ali
- Founder: Mizanur Rahman Chowdhury
- Founded: 12 August 1978
- Dissolved: 1984
- Split from: AL
- Merged into: JND
- Headquarters: Dhaka
- Ideology: Multi-party democracy
- Political position: Centrist

Awami League (Mizan) was a political party in Bangladesh. Its registered name was Awami League.

== History ==
After the 15 August 1975 coup d'état, the Bangladesh Awami League was revived in 1976. However, internal conflicts over leadership persisted. In March 1978, a debate arose within the party over whether to follow a multi-party democracy or a one-party system. In the same year, Abdul Malek Ukil was elected as the party president, while Mizanur Rahman Chowdhury's opposition to the one-party system caused further discord within the party.

On 12 August 1978, amid the internal conflicts, Bangladesh Awami League politician Mizanur Rahman Chowdhury announced the formation of a new separate convening committee. He claimed that the conflict stemmed from the coexistence of supporters of the one-party system, particularly those favoring the former Bangladesh Krishak Sramik Awami League, and advocates of multi-party democracy. He asserted that at least 20-22 members of the central executive committee supported his decision. As a result, the Bangladesh Awami League split into two factions—one led by Mizan and the other by Malek.

Between 3-5 November 1978, the Bangladesh Awami League faction led by Mizan held a council where a full party committee was announced. He was made the party president, Muhammad Yusuf Ali was appointed general secretary, Mohiuddin Ahmed and Muzaffar Hossain Paltu were made joint conveners, and Nur-e-Alam Siddique was appointed organizational secretary. The party participated in the 1979 Bangladeshi general election and won two seats. In that election, its electoral symbol was 'ladder'. In 1984, Mizan's faction merged into the Janadal, established by A. F. M. Ahsanuddin Chowdhury.

== Election results ==
Election	Party leader	Votes	%	Seats	+/–	Position	Government
1979	Mizanur Rahman Chowdhury	535,426	2.78%	2 / 300	New	▲5th	Opposition

== See also ==
- Bangladesh Krishak Sramik Awami League (1983–1991)
