= Haritana Adarsha Secondary School =

High School in Bangladesh

- হাড়িটানা আদর্শ মাধ্যমিক বিদ্যালয়

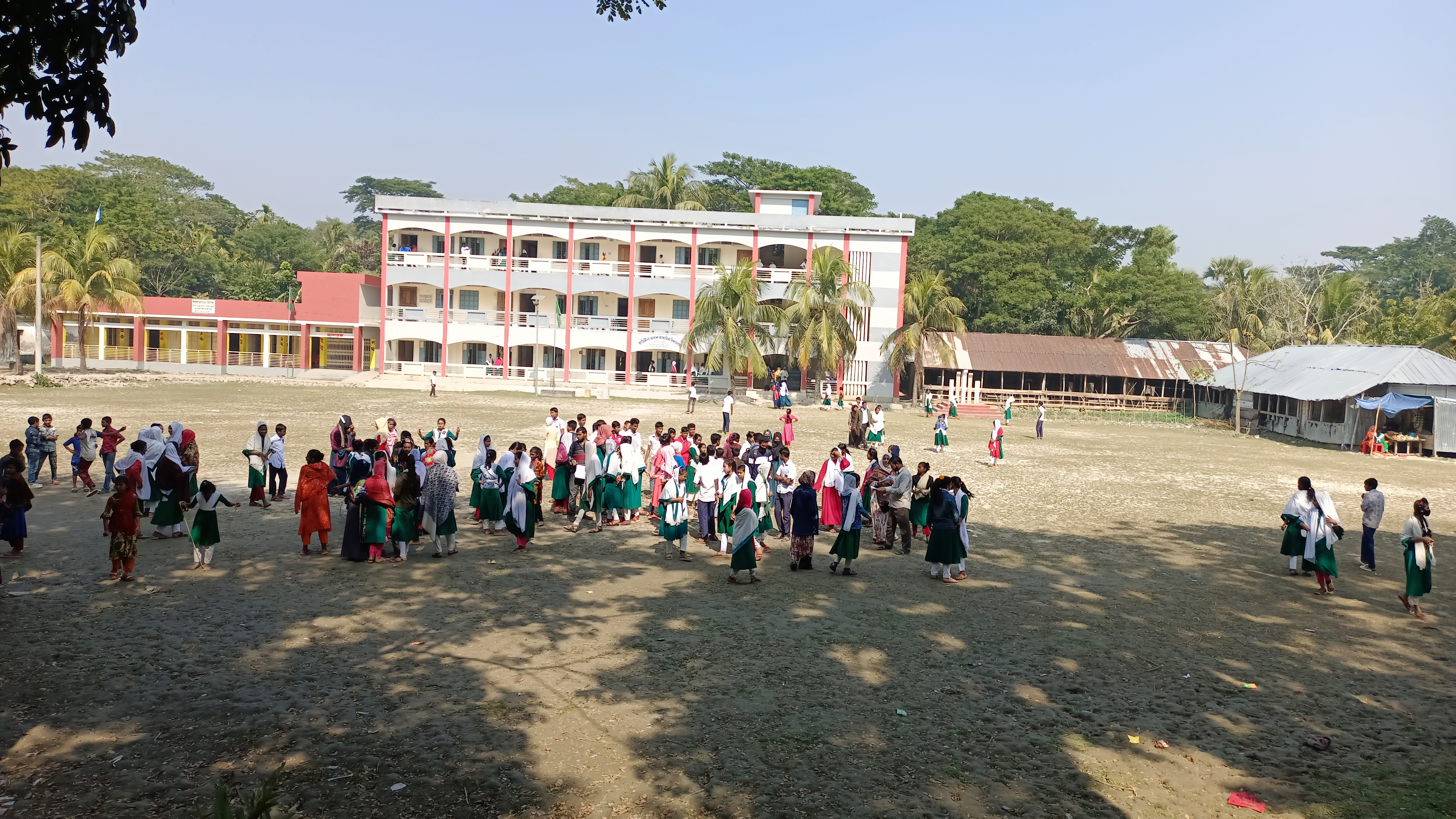
- Logo of Haritana Adarsha Secondary High School

Location
- Haritana village Patharghata Upazila, Barguna District; 8720; Bangladesh
- Coordinates: 22.0139°N 89.9563°E

Information
- Type: High School
- Motto: পড়, তোমার প্রভুর নামে (Recite in the name of your Lord)
- Established: 1979
- School board: Board of Intermediate and Secondary Education, Barisal
- School district: Barguna District
- Headmaster: Utpal Kumar Mitro
- Faculty: 8 (as of 2013)
- Grades: Class VI-X
- Gender: Boys and Girls
- Enrollment: 400+
- Language: Bengali & English
- Campus type: Village
- Color
- Communities served: Scouting, Red crescent
- School Code: 100316

Haritana Adarsha Secondary School is a high school located at Patharghata Upazila in Barguna District, Bangladesh. This school follows curriculum of Barisal Education Board. It is a semi-public educational institution located at Haritana village. It was founded by some wealthy locals in 1979. The school offers grades from class VI to class X.

== History ==
The school was established in 1979 as a junior high school with the some wealthy local persons. It was recognised by government on 1 June 1981. Indigenous people helped to build this school. In 1995 it was started as a secondary school and was recognised on 1 January 1995.
