= Md. Rustum Ali Faraji =

Bangladeshi politician (born 1952)

- মোঃ রুস্তম আলী ফরাজী

Member of the Bangladesh Parliament for Pirojpur-3
- In office 25 January 2014 – 29 January 2024
- Preceded by: Anwar Hossain
- Succeeded by: Shamim Shahnawaz
- In office 14 July 1996 – 27 October 2006
- Preceded by: Mohiuddin Ahmed
- Succeeded by: Anwar Hossain

Personal details
- Born: 21 March 1952 (age 74)
- Party: Bangladesh Nationalist Party; Jatiya Party (Ershad); Independent

Md. Rustum Ali Faraji (born 21 March 1952) is a Bangladeshi politician who is former Jatiya Sangsad member from the Pirojpur-3 constituency. He has been a member of the Bangladesh Nationalist Party and the Jatiya Party (Ershad).

== Early life and career ==
Faraji worked as physician before becoming a politician.

Faraji was elected to the parliament from Pirojpur-3 as a Jatiya Party candidate in 1996 and as a Bangladesh Nationalist Party candidate in 2001. He was elected to parliament on 5 January 2014 from Pirojpur-3 as an independent candidate. He is a member of the Parliamentary Standing Committee on Public Accounts.

Faraji was not nominated by the Jatiya Party for the 2024 Bangladeshi general election.
