= Bakerganj-18 =

Constituency of Bangladesh's Jatiya Sangsad 1973–1979

Coordinates: 22.97°N 90.23°E

- Former constituency for the Jatiya Sangsad
- District: Barisal District
- Division: Barisal Division

Former constituency
- Created: 1973
- Abolished: 1979

Bakerganj-18 was a constituency represented in the Jatiya Sangsad of Bangladesh from 1973 to 1979 in Barisal District. Throughout its existence, it returned one member of Parliament, that being Mohiuddin Ahmed.

== History ==
The constituency was created for the first general elections in newly independent Bangladesh, held in 1973.

== Members of Parliament ==
Election	Member	Party
1973	Mohiuddin Ahmed	Awami League
Former Constituency

== See also ==
- 1973 Bangladeshi general election
- List of members of the 1st Jatiya Sangsad
