= Bihanga Island =

Island in Bangladesh

Coordinates: 22.0221°N 89.9066°E

Native name: ধানসির চর
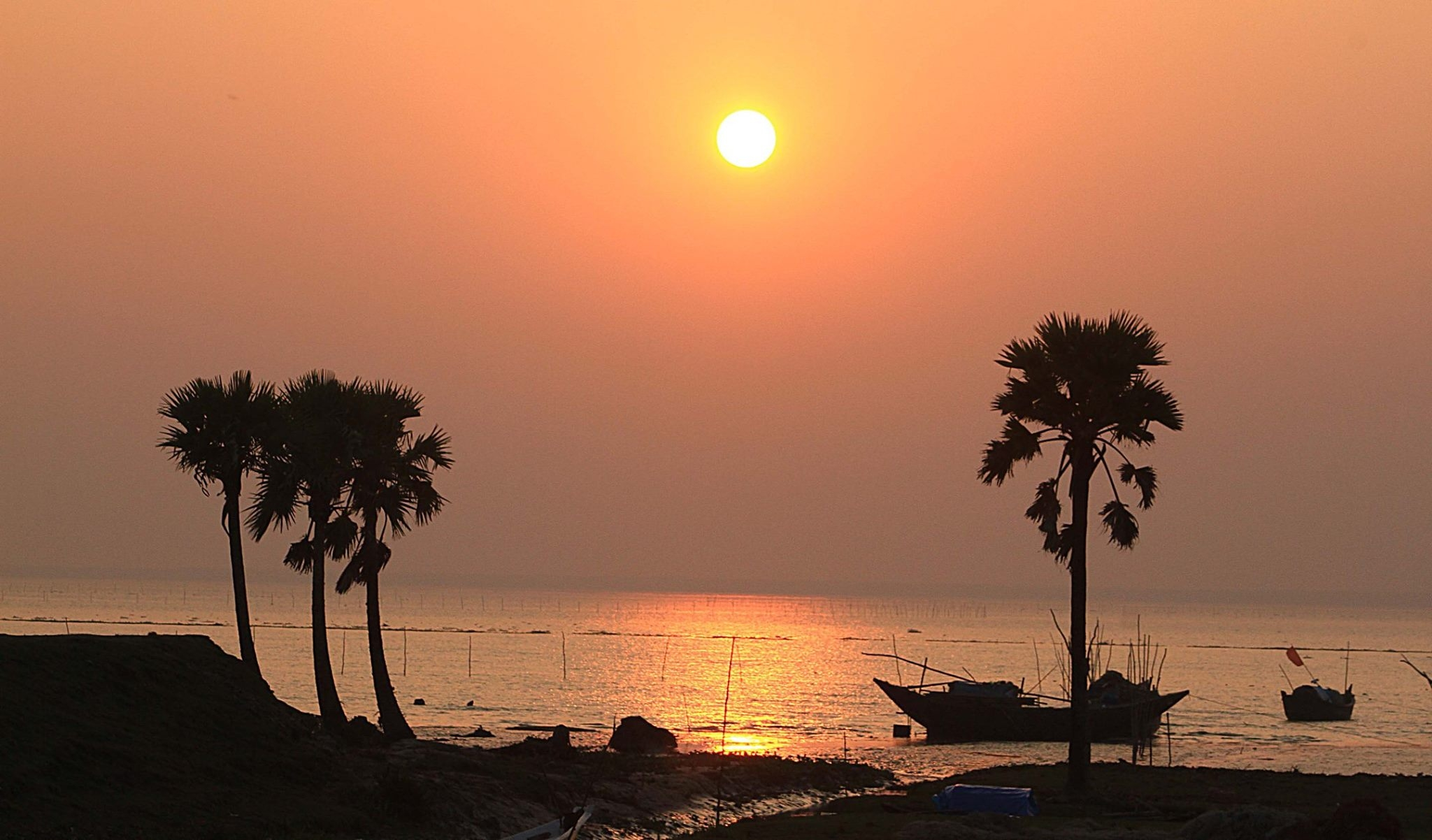
- Interactive map of Bihanga Island

Geography
- Location: Baleshwari River

Administration
- Bangladesh
- Division: Barisal Division
- District: Barguna District
- Upazila: Patharghata Upazila

Additional information
- Time zone: BST (UTC+6)

Bihanga Island is located at Patharghata Upazila in Barguna District. It is an island of Baleshwari River. Although the island was discovered long ago, it was recently named Bihanga Island. The name Bihanga in Bengali language means "bird". To the locals it is known as the Dhanseer Char. At one time, the island had a lot of Dhanshee plants. It is located close to the World Heritage Sunderbans.

== Geography ==
World Heritage Sundarbans in the west, Patharghata Upazila in the east, Chordwani Union and some parts of Sunderbans in the north and Baleshwari river in the south between the Bay of Bengal.
