= Alamgir Mohammad Mahfuzullah Farid =

Bangladeshi politician

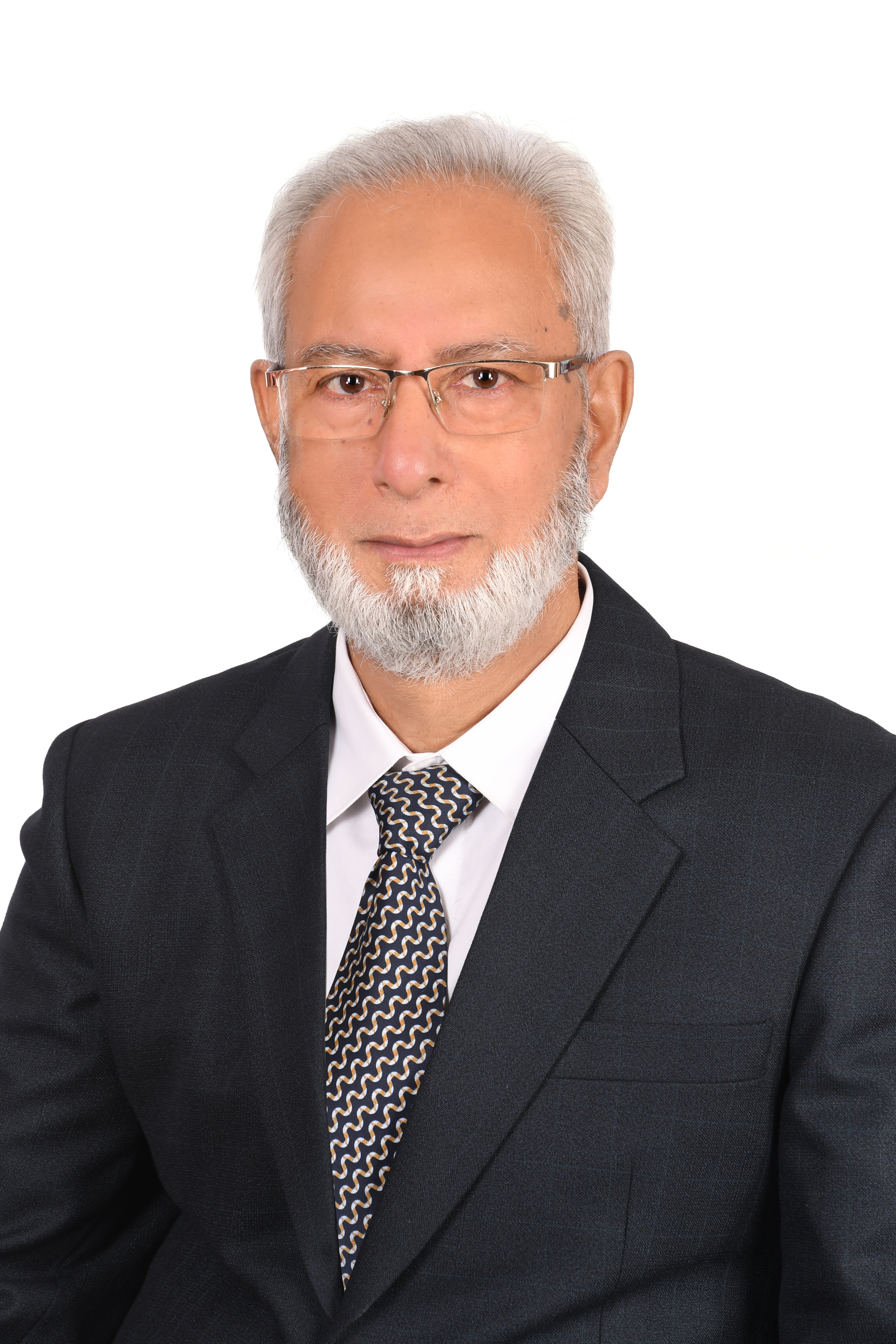
- Photo of 2025

Member of Parliament
- In office 14 July 1996 – 29 October 2006
- Preceded by: A. T. M. Nurul Bashar Chowdhury
- Succeeded by: A. H. M. Hamidur Rahman Azad
- Constituency: Cox's Bazar-2

Personal details
- Born: 1 October 1957 (age 69) Moheshkhali Upazila, Cox's Bazar, East Pakistan
- Party: Bangladesh Nationalist Party
- Occupation: Advocate
- Profession: Advocate

Alamgir Mohammad Mahfuzullah Farid (Bengali: আলমগীর মোহাম্মদ মাহফুজুল্লাহ ফরিদ) is a Bangladesh Nationalist Party politician and a former member of parliament from Cox's Bazar-2. Apart from his political career, Farid is also an advocate registered with the Cox’s Bazar Bar Council.

== Career ==
Farid was elected to parliament in 1996 from Cox's Bazar-2 as a candidate of the Bangladesh Nationalist Party. He was reelected from Cox's Bazar-2 in 2001. He served on the Public Undertaking Committee in the Parliament. Farid was listed as serial no. 122 on the Bangladesh Nationalist Party's National Executive Committee, confirming his membership in the party’s top policymaking body.He was elected to parliament in 2026 again from Cox'sBazar-2 after defeating Jaamat backed candidate by almost 35,000 votes.

== Personal life ==
Alamgir Md Mahfujullah Farid was born into a family of eight siblings — four brothers and four sisters. His eldest brother, the late Sirajul Haque, served as a union parishad chairman. His second brother, the late Akramul Haque, was an officer in the Department of Agricultural Extension. Farid is the third among the brothers. His youngest brother, Mohammad Shahidullah, was also chairman of Boro Moheshkhali Union Parishad in Cox’s Bazar. He also has four sisters.

== Controversy ==
On 13 May 2007, he was arrested by the Rapid Action Battalion on corruption charges. He was arrested on 5 extortion cases filed against him in Moheshkhali Police Station on 15 April 2007. The Anti-Corruption Commission filed charges against him and his wife for corruption on 29 April 2008.
