= Anwar Hossain (physician) =

Bangladeshi politician

- আনোয়ার হোসেন

Member of Parliament for Pirojpur-3
- In office 25 January 2009 – 24 January 2014
- Preceded by: Md. Rustum Ali Faraji
- Succeeded by: Md. Rustum Ali Faraji

Personal details
- Born: 1 March 1955 (age 71)
- Party: Bangladesh Awami League

Anwar Hossain (born 1 March 1955) is a Bangladesh Awami League politician and a former Jatiya Sangsad member representing the Pirojpur-3 constituency.
