= Pirojpur-4 =

Constituency of Bangladesh's Jatiya Sangsad

- Former constituency for the Jatiya Sangsad
- District: Pirojpur District
- Division: Barisal Division

Former constituency
- Created: 1984
- Abolished: 1988

Pirojpur-4 is a defunct constituency represented in the Jatiya Sangsad (National Parliament) of Bangladesh abolished in 1988.

== Members of Parliament ==
Election	Member	Party
1986	M. A. Jabbar	Jatiya Party (Ershad)
1988	Manirul Islam	Jatiya Party (Ershad)
Abolished constituency
