= A. T. M. Nurul Bashar Chowdhury =

Bangladesh Nationalist Party politician

ATM Nurul Bashar Chowdhury
- এ টি এম নুরুল বশর চৌধুরী

Member of Parliament for Cox's Bazar-2
- In office 15 February 1996 – 12 June 1996
- Preceded by: Md. Ishak
- Succeeded by: Alamgir Mohammad Mahfuzullah Farid

Administrator of Cox's Bazar Zila Parishad

Personal details
- Born: Cox's Bazar District
- Party: Bangladesh Nationalist Party

ATM Nurul Bashar Chowdhury (Bengali: এ টি এম নুরুল বশর চৌধুরী) is a Bangladesh Nationalist Party politician. He was elected a member of parliament for Cox's Bazar-2 in the February 1996 Bangladeshi general election.

Currently, he is serving as the Administrator of Cox's Bazar Zila Parishad.

== Early life ==
ATM Nurul Bashar Chowdhury was born on 1 January 1953 in Cox's Bazar District.

== Career ==
Chowdhury is the senior vice president and former general secretary of Cox's Bazar district BNP. He was the chairman of Kutubdia Upazila Parishad and the elected chairman of Ali Akbar Dale Union for 5 consecutive terms.

He was elected to parliament for Cox's Bazar-2 as a Bangladesh Nationalist Party candidate in the 15 February 1996 Bangladeshi general election.
