= Matarbari Port =

First deep-sea port in Bangladesh

- Interactive map of Matarbari Port
- Location within Bangladesh

Location
- Country: Bangladesh
- Location: Matarbari, Maheshkhali Upazila, Cox's Bazar
- Coordinates: 21.6914°N 91.8590°E

Details
- Owned by: Government of Bangladesh
- Type of Harbor: Artificial
- No. of berths: 2
- No. of wharfs: 1
- No. of piers: 2
- Draft depth: 14.5 m (48 ft)
- Navigational channel: Length: 14.3 km (8.9 mi); Width: 350 m (1,150 ft)

Matarbari Port is an under-construction sea port on the shores of Bay of Bengal, located at Moheshkhali upazila, Cox's Bazar district, Chittagong Division, Bangladesh. Construction of the port began in the late 2010s with the construction of a Captic Jetty for the Matarbari Power Plant, and later the Government of Bangladesh undertook a project to build a full-fledged commercial port. Once completed, it will be Bangladesh's first deep-sea port. It is estimated that the cost for the construction of the port in the first phase will be ৳177.77 billion to ৳200.00 billion, including the approach road.

The port consists of an artificial harbour, and its navigable channel is surrounded by Breakwaters. The harbour has a depth of 16 m (52 ft) and can accommodate panamax and capesize ships. Cargo will be handled through container berths and multi-purpose cargo berths at the harbour. The port has a navigable channel about 14.3 km (8.9 mi) long and 350 m (1,150 ft) wide with a depth of 16 m (52 ft), which is the deepest among ports in Bangladesh. The port's draft ranges from about 14.4 m (47 ft) to a maximum of 18 m (59 ft) with tidal support, which will allow entry for carrying more than 8,000 TEUs or 100,000 deadweight tons container ships.

== History ==
The initiative to build a deep-seaport in Bangladesh was taken in 2009. In 2009, Pacific Consultants International of Japan visited nine potential sites and submitted a survey report recommending the construction of a deep-seaport at Sonadia. As a result, Sonadia island in Cox's Bazar was proposed as the site for setting up the first deep-seaport in Bangladesh. The Government of Bangladesh approved the Sonadia Island deep-seaport project in 2012, and the first phase is scheduled to be completed in 2016. Funding for the project was discussed with China, but the project fell through when Prime Minister Sheikh Hasina's visit to China in June 2014 failed to sign a memorandum of understanding for the construction of a deep-seaport at Sonadia.

The feasibility of seaport development began when three jetties were constructed to bring in materials for the Matarbari coal-based power plant funded by the Japanese agency JICA. JICA conducted a data collection survey in 2016, which revealed the possibility of developing a commercial port using the channel adjacent to the three jetties. After this survey, the Ministry of Shipping examined the feasibility of developing a seaport in the area and said that it is possible to build a seaport for commercial use. Later, along with the construction of the Port of Payra in Patuakhali, the Government of Bangladesh took the plan to construct a deep-seaport at Matarbari. Matarbari sea port was originally built for Matarbari coal-fired power plant then the government decided to turn it into a deep-seaport.

The Executive Committee of the National Economic Council approved the construction of the Matarbari port on March 10, 2020. The cost of this project, including ports and connecting roads, is estimated at ৳177.77 billions, of which ৳128.93 billions is collected from Japan as a loan, and the Government of Bangladesh agreed to provide ৳26.71 billions and Chittagong Port Authority ৳22.13 billions. After the approval, design work on the terminal began in July 2020. After the finalization of the design, tenders are issued and notified, and in the tender, two companies jointly led by Pentawashen Construction Company Limited submitted a tender.

Coal Power Generation Company Bangladesh Limited or CPGCBL dredged a 14.3 km (8.9 mi) long shipping channel under the coal based power project at Matarbari. As per the original plan, the channel was supposed to be 3 km-long, 250 metres wide and 15 m (49 ft) deep; but as per the agreement signed between the Ministry of Shipping and the Ministry of Power, Energy and Mineral Resources on 29 November 2018, the depth, length and width of the channel were increased to 16 m (52 ft), 14.3 km (8.9 mi) and 350 m (1,150 ft) respectively for the construction of Matarbari port. On 29 December 2020, MV Venus Triumph, a 120 metres long general cargo ship, became the first foreign ship to dock at the port. The shipping channel was handed over to the Chittagong Port Authority on 20 September 2023. On 11 November 2023, Prime Minister Sheikh Hasina inaugurated the channel and laid the foundation stone of the construction of the terminal.

On 25 April 2023, a vessel named Ausu Maro with a length of 230 m (750 ft) and a draft of 14 m (46 ft) berthed as the first coal carrier at the coal jetty of Matarbari power plant. The vessel was carrying 80,000 metric tonnes of coal for the Matarbari coal-fired power plant, and it was the largest cargo ship berthed at any port jetty in Bangladesh.

== Development ==
Based on the Japanese ports of Kashima and Niigata, the port will be the first deep sea port and the fourth sea port in Bangladesh. The port is planned to reduce pressure on the Port of Chittagong. During the first stage, one 300 metres (980 ft) long multipurpose terminal and one 460 metres (1,510 ft) meter long container terminal is planned to be constructed by 2026. The navigation channel will be 350 metres (1,150 ft) length with a maximum permissible draught of 16 metres (52 ft). Ships with the capacity of 8,000 TEU containers will be able to dock. In September 2020, Japan International Cooperation Agency won the contract for the consultancy services of Matarbari Port development project. Two contracts were signed by Roads and Highways Department (RHD) with Oriental Consultants Global Company Ltd and by Chittagong Port Authority with Nippon Koei.

== Port details ==
=== Harbour and navigation channel ===
The Matarbari port's harbour is an artificial harbour, protected by a sea wall along with a navigation channel. The prescribed water depth for the harbour is 16 m (52 ft); the maneuvering basin in the middle of the harbor is also 16 m (52 ft) deep.

Depth of water in the channel
Depth		Measure (meters)
Condition	Value	Measure (meters)
Natural depth	Range	5–16 metres (16–52 ft)
Natural depth	Dredged	16 metres (52 ft)
Tidal depth	Maximum	18 metres (59 ft)

The port's navigation channel connects the 16 m (52 ft) deep water body of the Bay of Bengal to the harbour. It is 14.3 km (8.9 mi) long, and used for ship navigation in the port's harbour. The navigation channel has a depth of 16 m (52 ft) and a minimum width of 350 m (1,150 ft), allowing ships with a draft of 15 m (49 ft) to enter and exit the harbour without tidal assistance. Tides of 4.88 m (16.0 ft) are observed in the harbour and navigation channel, and ships with drafts of 18 m (59 ft) are able to berth at the jetty with tidal support.

=== Terminals ===
The first phase of the port includes two terminals—a general cargo multipurpose terminal and a container terminal—with a quay (wharf) and an inner-bay for tug boats. The height of the deck of quay is 9 metres (30 ft) above the water surface, and the total length is 760 meters.

In the first phase of construction, the container terminal will be built on 20 hectares and will have a 460-meter long berth or part of quay. It will be able to accommodate 8,000 TEU vessels and will have an annual capacity of 6,00,000 to 1.1 million TEU. Later, the container terminal will be expanded, up to 70 hectares, with a 1,850 metres (6,070 ft) berth, and have a 2.8 million TEU capacity. The multi-purpose terminal will be built on 12 hectares, have a 300 metres (980 ft) berth, and be able to accommodate vessels with up to 70,000 dwt. The terminal will have an annual cargo handling capacity of 0.6 million tonnes of grain and 1,200 tonnes of steel products.

== See also ==
- Ports in Bangladesh

== Bibliography ==
- JICA (2018). Final Report Preparatory Survey on Matarbari Port Development Project in the People’s Republic of Bangladesh (PDF) (Report). Japan International Cooperation Agency.
