= Mohiuddin Ahmed (politician, born 1925) =

Bangladeshi politician

- মহিউদ্দিন আহমেদ

Member of 5th Jatiya Sangsad
- In office 27 February 1991 – 15 February 1996
- Preceded by: M. A. Jabbar
- Succeeded by: M. A. Jabbar
- Constituency: Pirojpur-3

Member of 2nd Jatiya Sangsad
- In office 18 February 1979 – 12 February 1982
- Preceded by: Mainul Hosein
- Succeeded by: Position abolished
- Constituency: Bakerganj-17

Member of 1st Jatiya Sangsad
- In office 7 March 1973 – 6 November 1976
- Preceded by: Position established
- Succeeded by: Position abolished
- Constituency: Bakerganj-18

Member of the East Bengal Legislative Assembly
- In office 1954–1954
- Constituency: Mathbaria

Personal details
- Born: 15 January 1925 Gulishakhali, Backergunge District, Bengal Presidency
- Died: 12 April 1997 (aged 72) Bangladesh
- Resting place: Martyred Intellectuals Graveyard, Mirpur, Dhaka
- Party: Bangladesh Awami League
- Other political affiliations: BAKSAL; Awami League (Mizan); National Awami Party; Ganatantri Dal; All-India Muslim League

Mohiuddin Ahmed (Bengali: মহিউদ্দিন আহমেদ; 15 January 1925 – 12 April 1997), also known by his daak naam Panna Mia (Bengali: পান্না মিঞা), was a Bangladeshi politician. He was elected a member of parliament in 1973, 1979 and 1991. He was posthumously awarded with an Ekushey Padak in 2000.

== Early life and family ==
Mohiuddin Ahmed Panna Mia was born on 15 January 1925 to a Bengali Muslim family in Gulishakhali Mia Bari in Mathbaria, Firozpur, then part of the Backergunge District of the Bengal Presidency. His father, Azharuddin Ahmed, was a member of the Bengal Legislative Council from 1920 to 1926. He was married to Begum Rebecca (died 2018) and had two sons and one daughter.

== Career ==
Ahmed was involved in political activism from the age of 12, particularly the Pakistan Movement. He was the general secretary of the All-India Muslim Student League's Nadia-Bakerganj branches. Ahmed was also a member of its central committee. He later became the secretary general of the Muslim League's Barisal branch. He then became the Secretary of the Krishak Federation and led the Ganatantri Dal. After that merged with the National Awami Party, he joined its central committee. During the 1954 East Bengal Legislative Assembly election, he was elected MLA for Mathbaria constituency as part of the United Front. Ahmed joined the Awami League in 1972 and was appointed as a senior vice-president. He took part in the Bengali language movement, the Six point movement and the Bangladesh Liberation War.

Following independence, he served as chairman of the Bangladesh Krishak Sramik Awami League and later became a senior member of the Awami League Central Presidium. Ahmed was elected to the Jatiya Sangsad from Bakerganj-18 as an Awami League candidate in 1973. Following the 1979 Bangladeshi general election, Ahmed was renominated as the Awami League (Mizan) MP for Bakerganj-17. During this term, he served as the deputy leader of the opposition party. His third term in the Jatiya Sangsad took place after being elected during the 1991 Bangladeshi general election from Pirojpur-3 constituency as a BAKSAL politician.

== Death ==
Ahmed died on 12 April 1997 in Bangladesh. He was buried at the Martyred Intellectuals Graveyard in Mirpur, Dhaka.
