= A. H. M. Hamidur Rahman Azad =

Bangladeshi politician

- এ. এইচ. এম. হামিদুর রহমান আজাদ

Coordinator of the 11 Party Alliance
- Incumbent
- Assumed office 19 October 2025

Assistant Secretary General of the Bangladesh Jamaat-e-Islami
- Incumbent
- Assumed office October 2016
- Ameer: Shafiqur Rahman
- Secretary-General: Mia Golam Parwar

Member of the Bangladesh Parliament for Cox's Bazar-2
- In office 5 January 2009 – 5 January 2014
- Preceded by: Alamgir Mahfuzullah Farid
- Succeeded by: Asheq Ullah Rafiq

Personal details
- Born: 1 December 1965 (age 60) North Dhurang, Kutubdia Upazila, Cox's Bazar, East Pakistan
- Party: Bangladesh Jamaat-e-Islami
- Occupation: Politician

A. H. M. Hamidur Rahman Azad (Bengali: এ. এইচ. এম. হামিদুর রহমান আজাদ) is a Bangladeshi politician affiliated with Bangladesh Jamaat-e-Islami. He is a former member of parliament from the Cox's Bazar-2 constituency and as of 2018 serves as the party's assistant secretary general.

== Career ==
Azad is the secretary of the Dhaka city unit of the Bangladesh Jamaat-e-Islami. Azad was elected to parliament in 2008 from Cox's Bazar-2 as a candidate of the Bangladesh Jamaat-e-Islami. He served on the Parliamentary Standing Committee on Ministry of Water Resources.
