= Moheshkhali Upazila =

Moheshkhali মহেশখালী
- Upazila
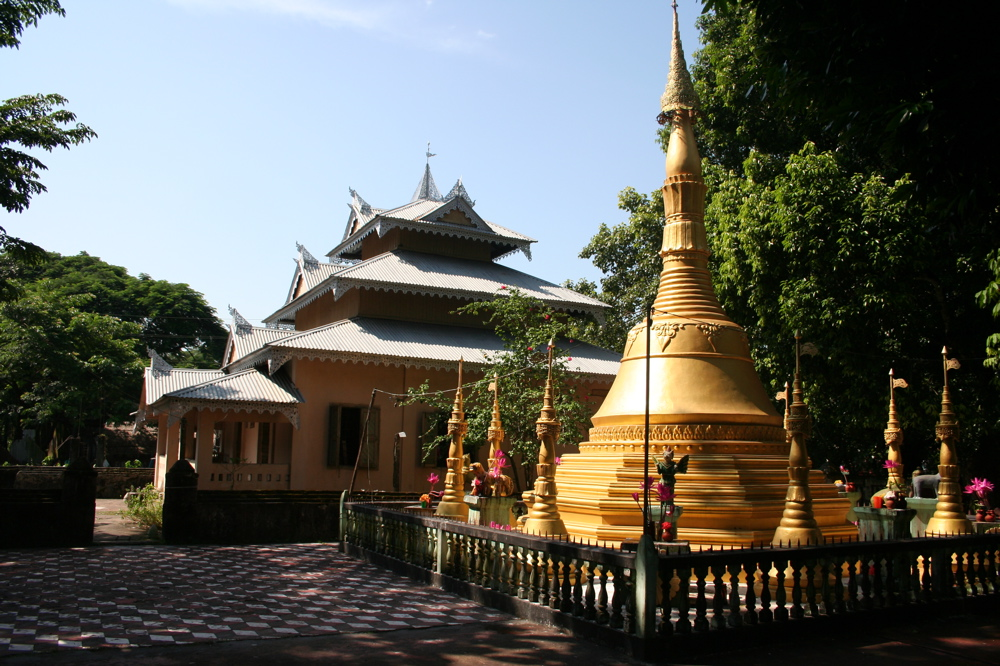
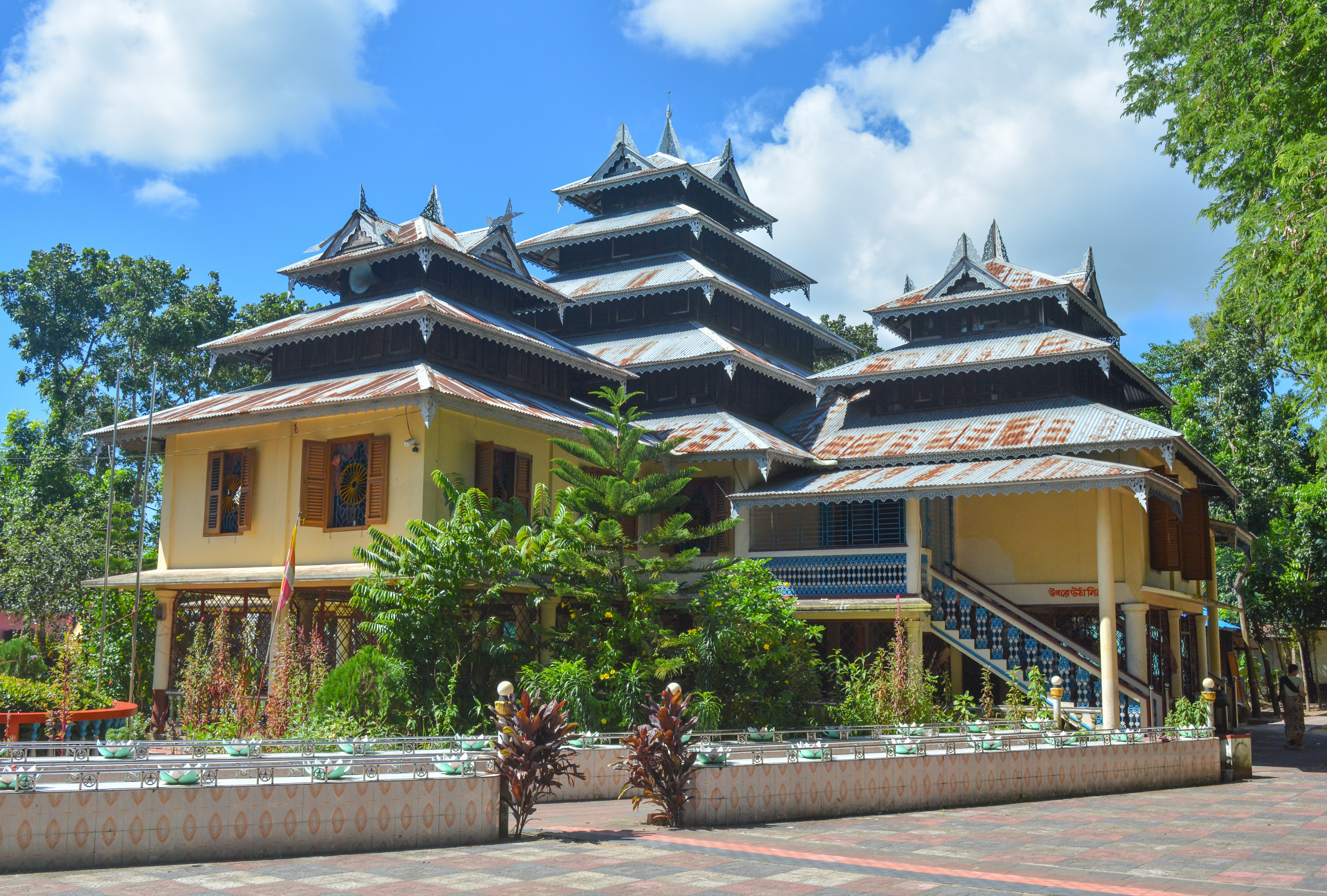
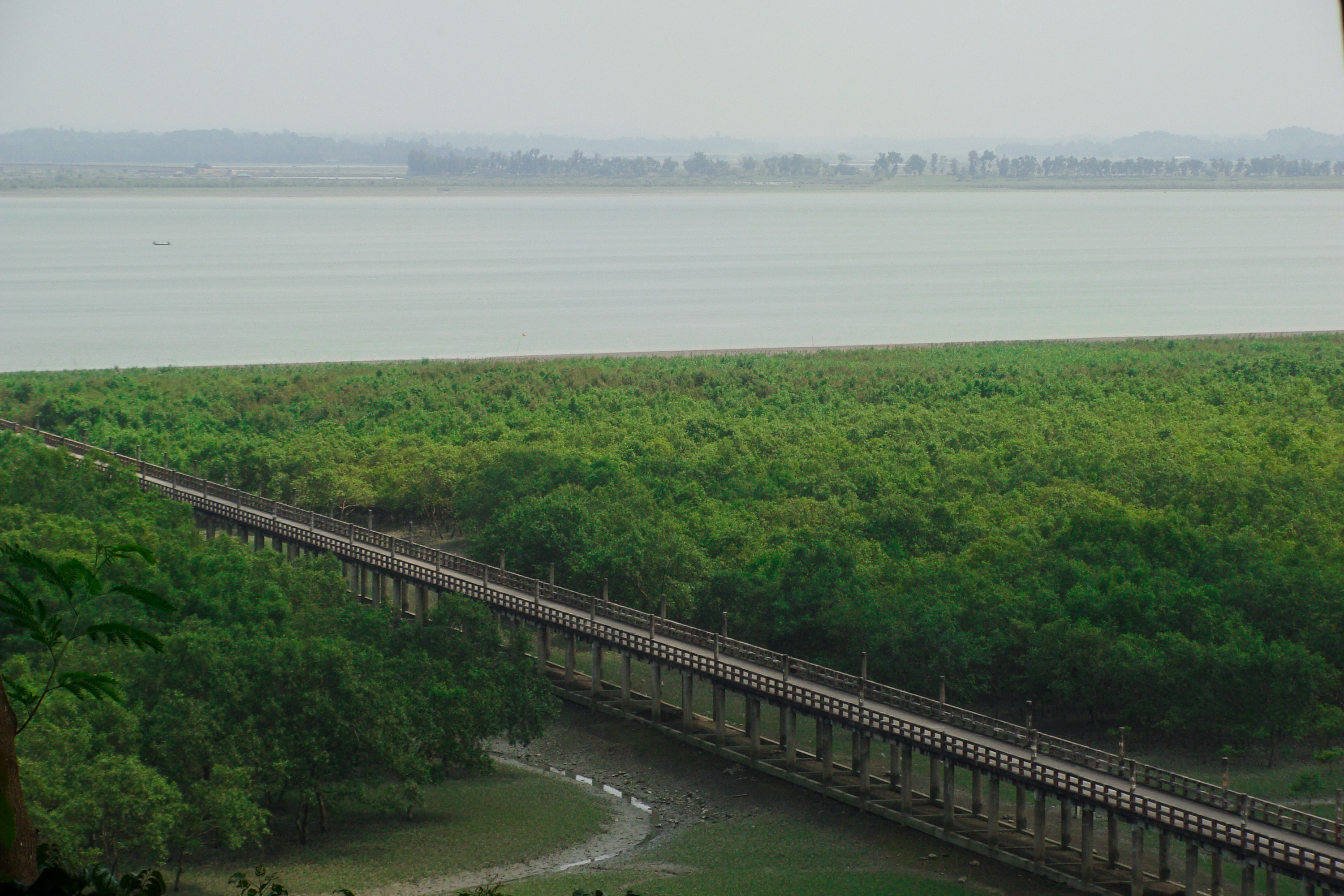
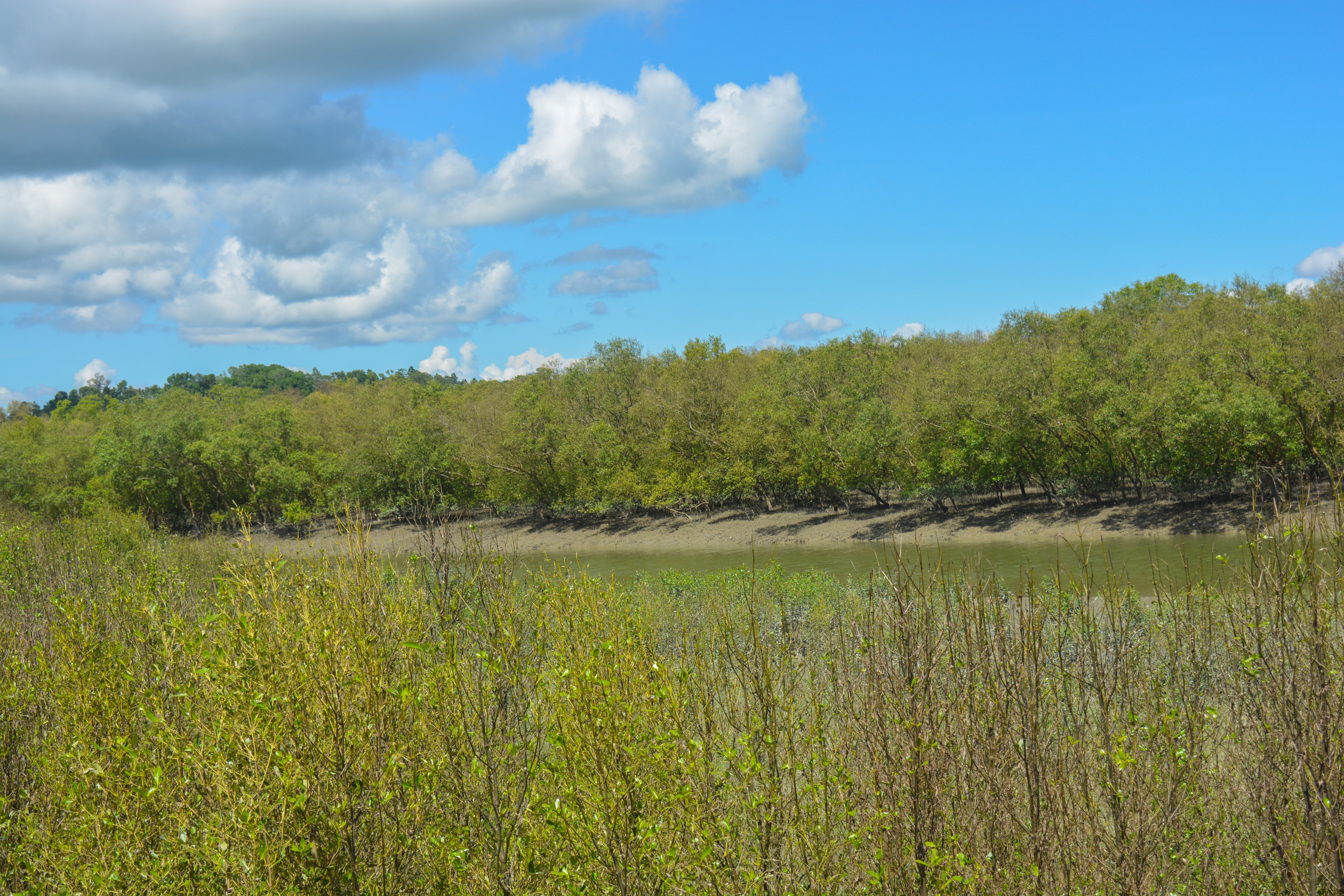
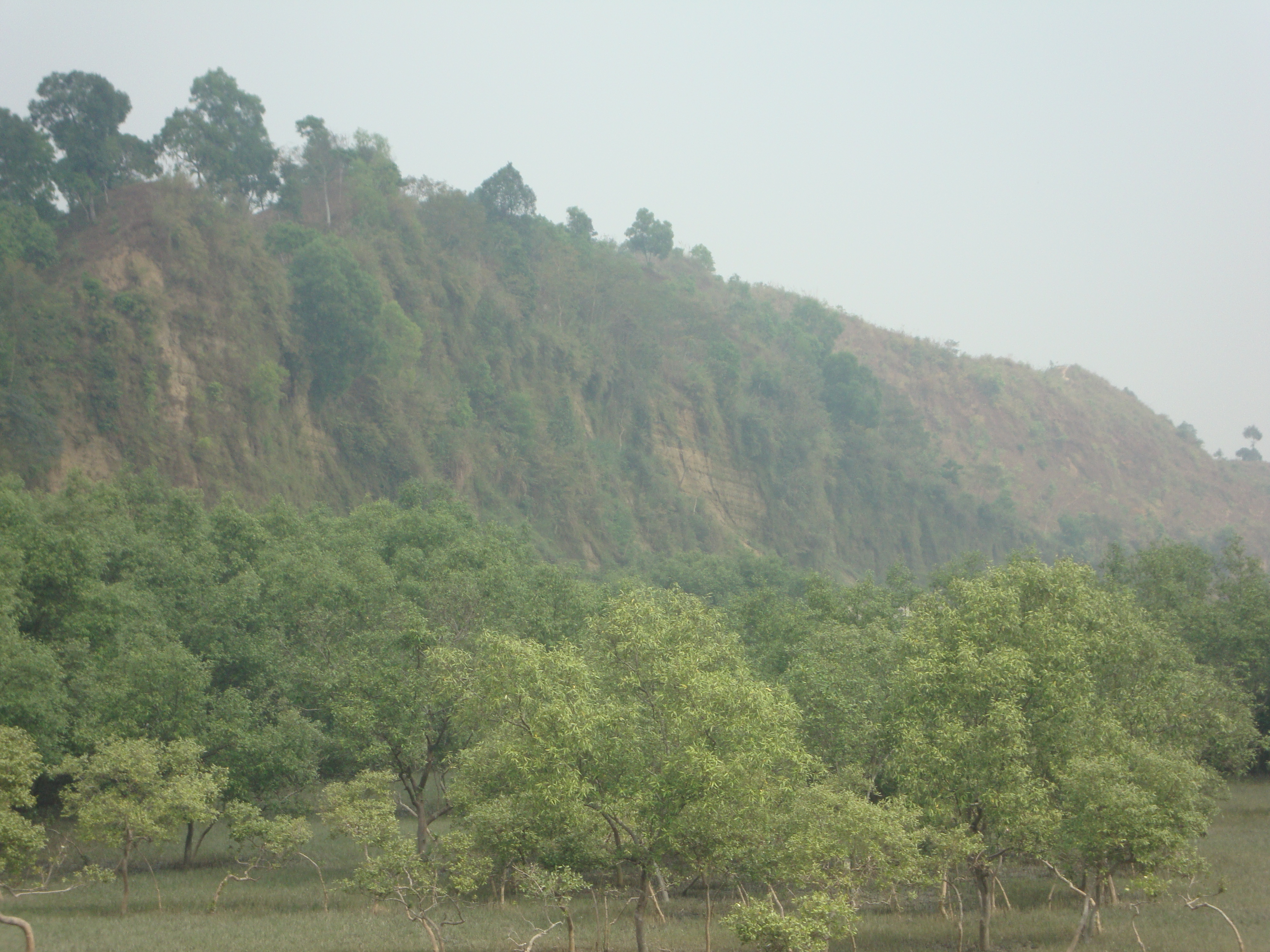
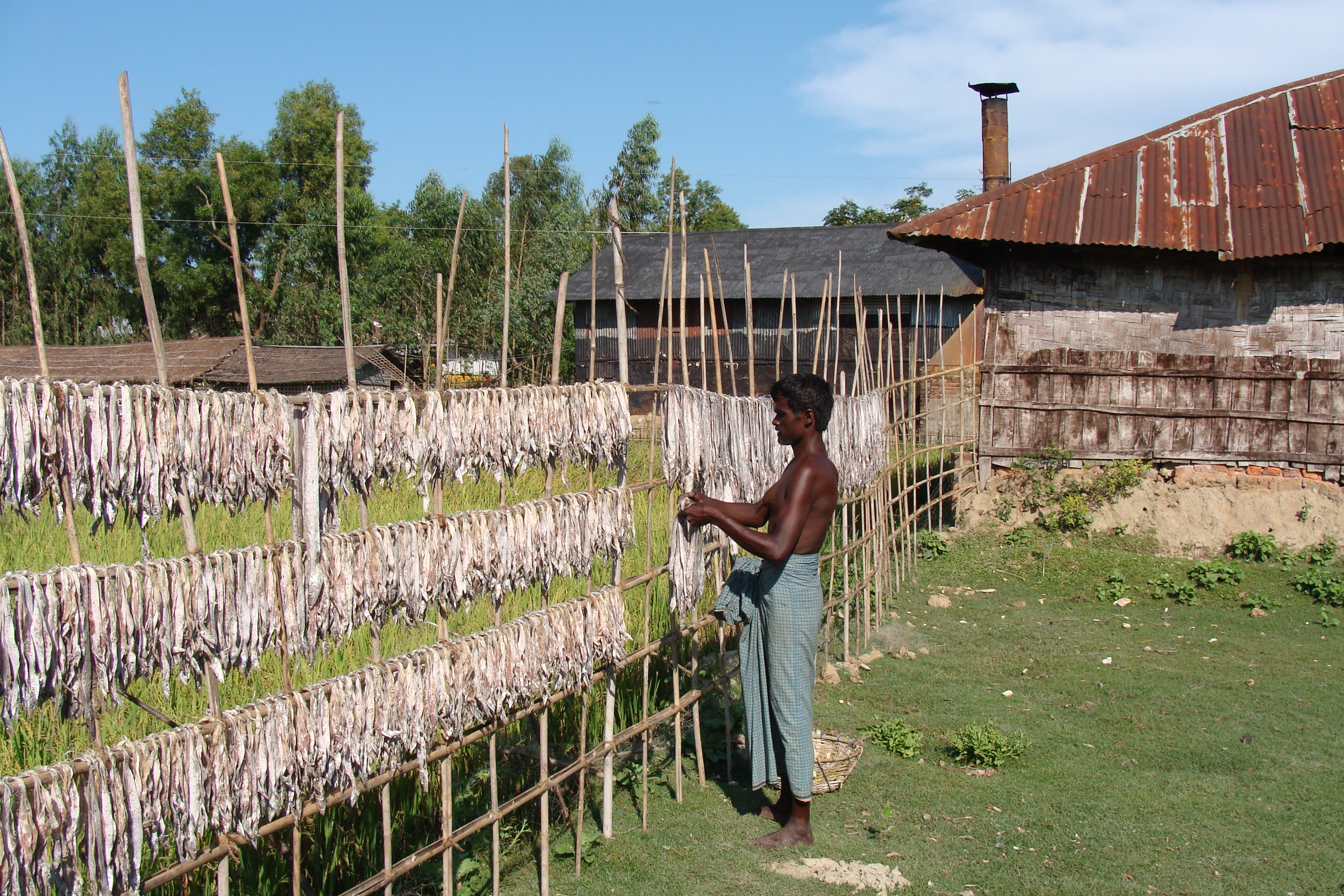
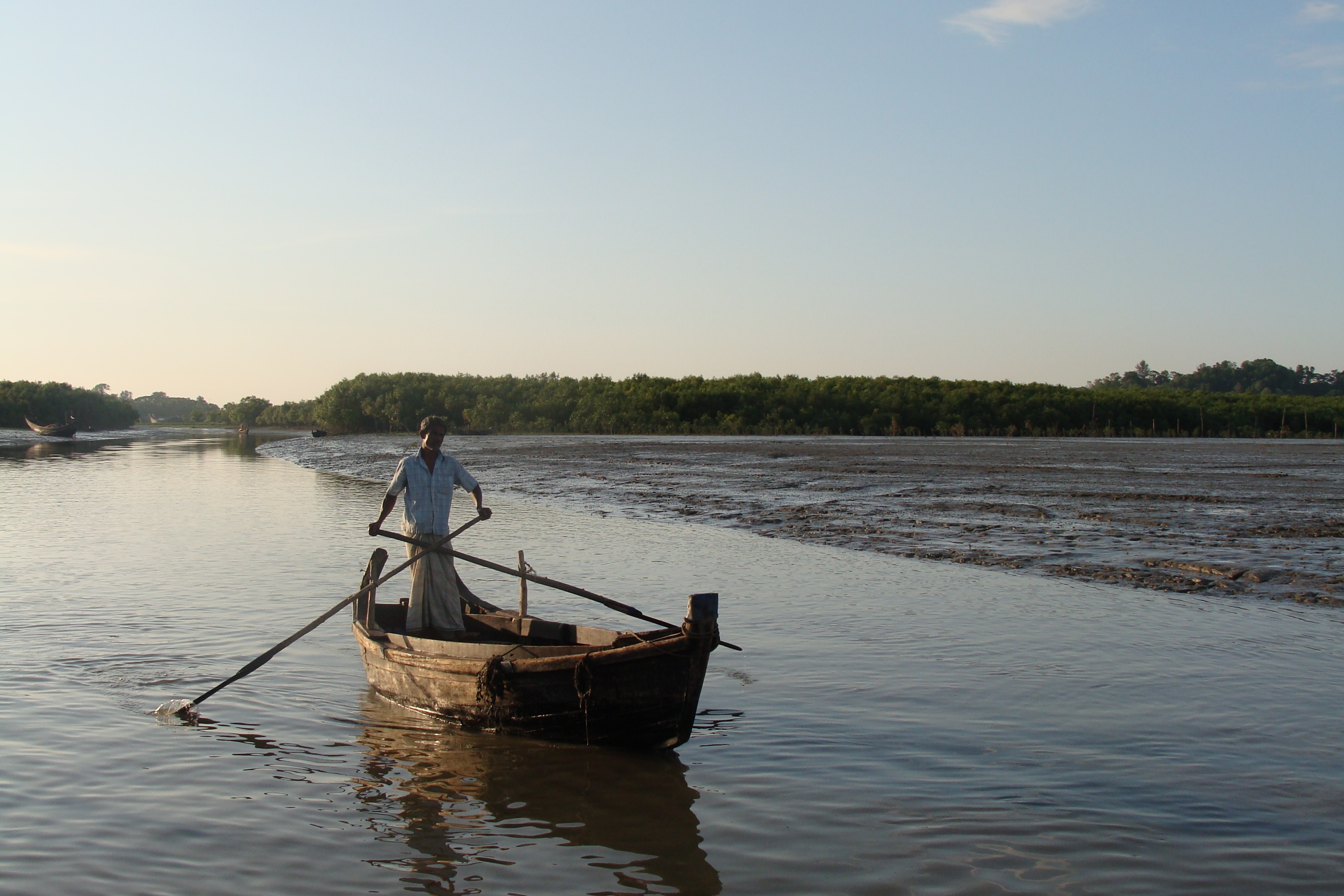
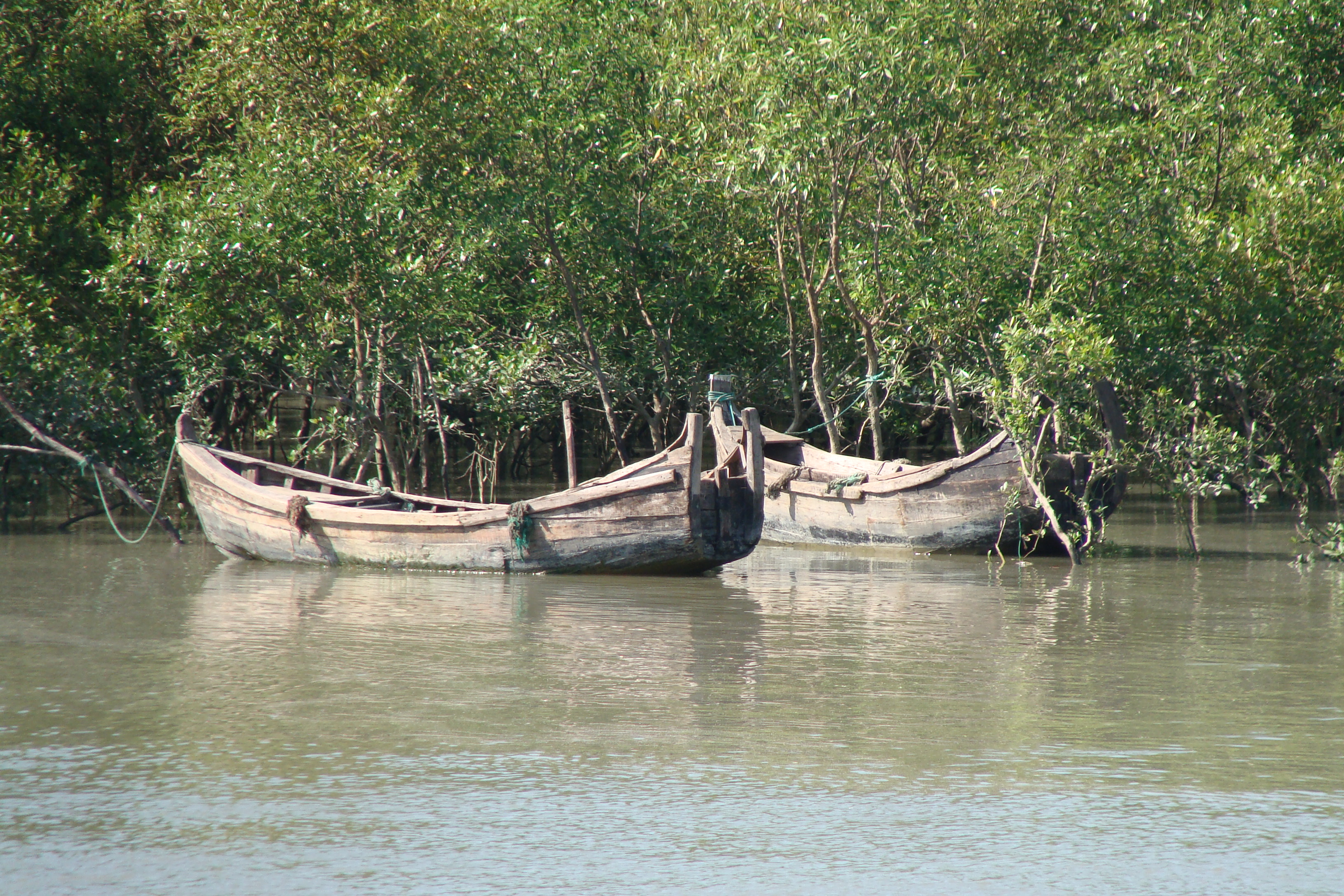
- From top: Adinath Buddhist Temple, Ananda Myitta Buddha Temple, Maheshkhali Bridge, Mangrove Island, Maheshkhali Hill Dried fish Village, Fish boats

- Coordinates: 21°33′N 91°57′E
- Country: Bangladesh
- Division: Chittagong
- District: Cox's Bazar

Area
  - Total: 362.18 km^{2} (139.84 sq mi)

Population (2022)
  - Total: 385,510
  - Density: 1,064.4/km^{2} (2,756.8/sq mi)
- Time zone: UTC+6 (BST)
- Postal code: 4710
- Area code: 03424
- Website: Official Map of Maheshkhali

Moheshkhali (Bengali: মহেশখালী) is an upazila of Cox's Bazar District in Chittagong, Bangladesh.

The government's ambitious project to transform Maheshkhali Island in the Bay of Bengal into a thriving energy hub aims to establish power plants and a liquefied natural gas (LNG) terminal by 2027. This endeavor is driven by the objective of strengthening the country's economy and achieving self-reliance in the power and fuel sector. As a result of this initiative, the country's energy crisis will improve significantly, and the socio-economic landscape of the region will become more sustainable.

To support this transformation, the government is constructing substantial oil storage infrastructure at Kalamarchara in Maheshkhali as part of the Single Point Mooring (SPM) project. This pipeline system will not only save time but also reduce expenses by approximately TK 800 crore annually. The Maheshkhali terminal will be equipped with six storage tanks, three for diesel and three for crude oil, allowing for storage capacities of approximately 115,000 tonnes of crude oil and 75,000 tonnes of diesel. This strategic storage capability will further bolster the country's energy security and reinforce its position as a robust energy hub in the region. According to the Maheshkhali Upazila Nirbahi, the Single Point Mooring (SPM) project holds paramount importance to the prime minister. The successful execution of this project is expected to generate employment opportunities for the local population, leading to the eradication of unemployment in this region.

== Geography ==
Moheshkhali is located at 21.5500°N 91.9500°E. It has 58,177 households and total area 362.18 km^{2}.

== Demographics ==
Religions in Maheshkhali Upazila (2022)
Religion	Percent
Islam	94.59%
Hinduism	4.72%
Buddhism	0.68%
Other or not stated	0.01%

According to the 2022 Bangladeshi census, Maheshkhali Upazila had 80,578 households and a population of 385,510. 12.88% of the population were under 5 years of age. Maheshkhali had a literacy rate (age 7 and over) of 63.85%: 62.46% for males and 65.28% for females, and a sex ratio of 104.11 males for every 100 females. 123,919 (32.14%) lived in urban areas.

As of the 2011 Census of Bangladesh, Maheshkhali upazila had 58,177 households and a population of 321,218. 94,186 (29.32%) were under 10 years of age. Maheshkhali had an average literacy rate of 30.78%, compared to the national average of 51.8%, and a sex ratio of 939 females per 1000 males. 27,321 (8.51%) of the population lived in urban areas. Ethnic population is 1,403 (0.44%).

As of the 1991 Bangladesh census, Moheshkhali has a population of 219520. Males constitute are 53.13% of the population, and females 46.87%. This Upazila's eighteen up population is 90892. Maheshkhali has an average literacy rate of, and the national average of literate.

== Administration ==
Moheshkhali Upazila is divided into Moheshkhali Municipality and eight union parishads: Bara Maheshkhali, Chota Moheshkhali, Dhalghata, Hoanak, Kalarmarchhara, Kutubjom, Matarbari, and Saflapur. The union parishads are subdivided into 25 mauzas and 151 villages.

Moheshkhali Municipality is subdivided into 9 wards and 28 mahallas.

== Notable residents ==
- Badiul Alam, Vice Chancellor of University of Chittagong (2006–2009), was born in Nalbila village in 1949.
- Alamgir Mohammad Mahfuzullah Farid, MP
- Md. Ishak, MP
- Jahirul Islam, MP
- Salimullah Khan, academic, essayist, and critic, grew up in Moheshkhali.
- Asheq Ullah Rafiq, MP

== See also ==
- Upazilas of Bangladesh
- Districts of Bangladesh
- Divisions of Bangladesh
