= Jahirul Islam =

Bangladeshi politician

Member of Parliament from Cox's Bazar-2
- In office 1986–1990
- Preceded by: Seats start
- Succeeded by: Md. Ishak

Personal details
- Born: Cox's Bazar District
- Party: Jatiya Party (Ershad)

Military service
- Allegiance: Pakistan (before 1972); Bangladesh
- Branch/service: Pakistan Air Force; Bangladesh Air Force
- Years of service: 1963 - 1981
- Rank: Wing Commander
- Unit: No. 5 Squadron, GD(N)
- Commands: Station Commander of BAF Station Shamshernagar; FSR of BAF Base Chittagong
- Battles/wars: Indo-Pakistani War of 1965

Jahirul Islam is a Jatiya Party (Ershad) politician and a former member of parliament for Cox's Bazar-2. He was an officer in the Bangladesh Air Force.

== Career ==
Islam was a wing commander in the Bangladesh Air Force. He was elected to parliament from Cox's Bazar-2 as a Jatiya Party candidate in 1986 and 1988.
