= Phuljhuri =

- Location in Bangladesh
- Coordinates: 22°13′N 90°9′E
- Country: Bangladesh
- Division: Barisal Division
- District: Barguna District
- Time zone: UTC+6 (Bangladesh Time)

Phuljhuri is a village in Barguna District in the Barisal Division of southern-central Bangladesh.

== Etymology ==
The term "Phuljhuri" etymologically means "a basket of flowers".
