= Shamim Shahnawaz =

Bangladeshi politician

Shamim Shahnewous

Member of the Bangladesh Parliament for Pirojpur-3
- In office 30 January 2024 – 6 August 2024
- Preceded by: Md. Rustum Ali Faraji

Personal details
- Born: 6 July 1974 (age 51)

Shamim Shahnewous (born 6 July 1974) is a Bangladeshi politician. He is a former Jatiya Sangsad member representing the Pirojpur-3 constituency. He defeated 5 time MP Md. Rustum Ali Faraji to gain office.

== Political career ==
Shamim Shahnewous's younger brother Ashrafur Rahman was nominated by Bangladesh Awami League for the Pirojpur-3 Mathbaria seat in the 12th National Assembly elections of 2024. He had to withdraw his nomination due to seat sharing calculations. Although the nomination was withdrawn, Ashrafur Rahman supported his elder brother, independent candidate Shamim Shahnewous.

Shamim Shahnewous, with the banana stick symbol, defeated four-time MP Md. Rustum Ali Faraji, securing 62,130 votes to become a member of parliament. After the non-cooperation movement in 2024, President Mohammed Shahabuddin dissolved the National Assembly, costing him his seat.
