= Md. Ishak =

Bangladeshi politician (1934–2001)

- মোঃ ইসহাক

Member of Parliament from Cox's Bazar-2
- In office 27 February 1991 – 15 February 1996
- Preceded by: Jahirul Islam
- Succeeded by: ATM Nurul Bashar Chowdhury

Personal details
- Born: 1 January 1934 Cox's Bazar District
- Died: 3 October 2001 (aged 67)
- Party: Bangladesh Awami League

Md. Ishak (1 January 1934 – 3 October 2001), known as Md. Ishaq BA, was a Bangladesh Awami League politician. He was elected a member of parliament for Cox's Bazar-2 in 1991.

== Early life ==
Md. Ishak was born on 1 January 1934 in Cox's Bazar District.

== Career ==
Ishaq was a politician of the Bangladesh Awami League. He was elected to parliament for Cox's Bazar-2 as a BAKSAL candidate in the 1991 Bangladeshi general election.

== Death ==
Md. Ishak died on 3 October 2001.
