= Asheq Ullah Rafiq =

Bangladeshi politician

- আশেক উল্লাহ রফিক

Member of Parliament
- In office 3 January 2014 – 6 August 2024
- Preceded by: A. H. M. Hamidur Rahman Azad
- Constituency: Cox's Bazar-2

Personal details
- Born: 24 July 1971 (age 55) Cox's Bazar, Bangladesh
- Party: Bangladesh Awami League
- Occupation: Business

Asheq Ullah Rafiq is a Bangladesh Awami League politician and a former Jatiya Sangsad member representing the Cox's Bazar-2 constituency. He is a senate member of the University of Chittagong.

== Early life ==
Asheq Ullah Rafiq was born on 24 July 1971. He completed his undergraduate and post graduate studies in accounting and finance. He was born in an illustrious political family in Cox's Bazar. Mr. Rafiq is engaged in student politics since his college days in Chittagong and after finishing his formal education he got himself actively in Awami League in his home town Cox's Bazar and village Moheskhali.

== Career ==
Rafiq was elected to parliament from Cox's Bazar-2 as a Bangladesh Awami League candidate on 5 January 2014.
