= Mathbaria =

Mathbaria মঠবাড়িয়া
- Town and Municipality
- Mathbaria Municipality mahallah geocode map

- Location in Bangladesh
- Coordinates: 22°18′N 89°57′E
- Country: Bangladesh
- Division: Barisal Division
- District: Pirojpur District
- Upazila: Mathbaria Upazila

Government
  - Body: Mathbaria Municipality

Area
  - Total: 22.50 km^{2} (8.69 sq mi)

Population
  - Total: 28,851
  - Density: 1,282/km^{2} (3,321/sq mi)
- Time zone: UTC+6 (Bangladesh Time)

Mathbaria (Bengali: মঠবাড়িয়া) is a town and municipality in Pirojpur District in Barisal Division of southwestern Bangladesh. It is the administrative headquarters of Mathbaria Upazila.
