= Baleshwari River =

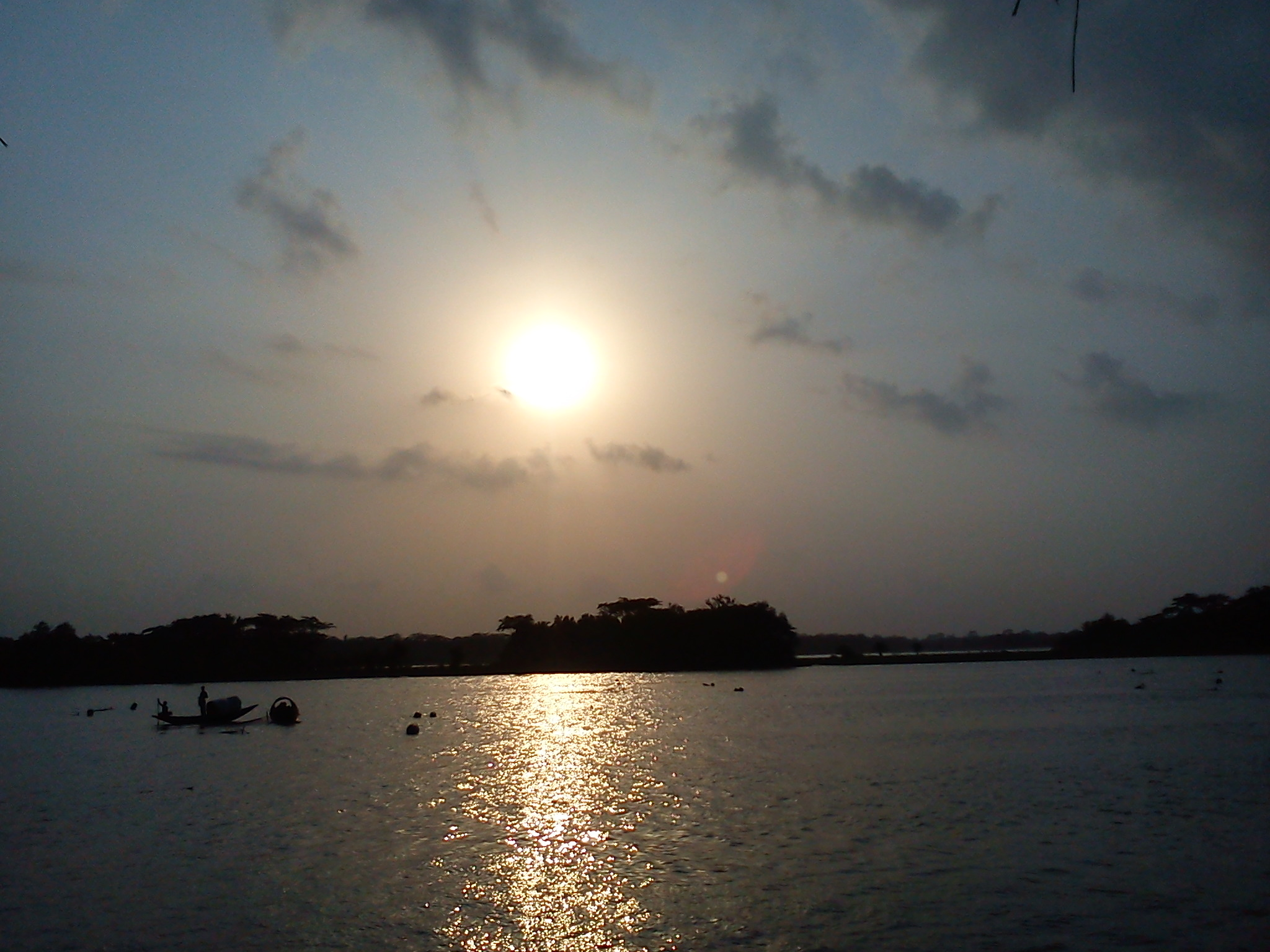
- Baleshwar River

Location
- Country: Bangladesh
- Region: Barisal Division
- Districts: Bagerhat and Barguna

Physical characteristics
- Source: Kaliganga River
  - coordinates: 22°44′03″N 89°59′50″E
- Mouth: Haringhata River (to the Bay of Bengal)
  - coordinates: 22°29′25″N 89°58′48″E
- Length: 146 km (91 mi)

The Baleshwari River is located in Bangladesh, forming part of the eastern border of Bagerhat District and the western border of Barguna District. It borders on the east the largest mangrove forest in the world, in the Ganges-Brahmaputra delta, the Bangladesh part of which is set aside as the Sundarbans Reserve Forest. The 146-kilometer-long Baleshwar flows south into the Haringhata River, which empties into the Bay of Bengal.

== See also ==
- Bihanga Island, island in the Baleshwari river.
