= Matarbari Power Plant =

Coal-fired power station in Bangladesh

The Matarbari Power Plant is a 1,200-megawatt (2×600) coal-fired power station under construction in Maheshkhali Upazila of Cox's Bazar District in southeastern Bangladesh.

The coal plant is being built with over $2.4 billion in climate change financing from Japan, and it is part of Japan's climate finance pledge.

Additionally, CPGCBL has planned to develop the 500-600 MW LNG based CCPP, Matarbari 2×600 MW USC CFPP (Phase II) Project, a 50 MW Grid-Tied Solar Power Project, a Wind Power Project, and a Transshipment Terminal (TT) Project. CPGCBL has also entered into an MOU in 2023 with Sembcorp Utilities PTE Ltd. for the development of a 400 MW Renewable Energy Generation Project at the Matarbari area.

== See also ==
- Electricity sector in Bangladesh
- List of power stations in Bangladesh
