= Bangladesh Krishak Sramik Awami League (1983–1991) =

Bangladesh Krishak Sramik Awami League বাংলাদেশ কৃষক শ্রমিক আওয়ামী লীগ
- Abbreviation: BaKSAL
- President: Mohiuddin Ahmed
- General Secretary: Abdur Razzaq
- Founder: Abdur Razzaq
- Founded: 22 October 1983
- Dissolved: 15 August 1991
- Split from: AL
- Merged into: AL
- Headquarters: Dhaka
- Ideology: Mujibism
- National affiliation: 8-party alliance

The Bangladesh Krishak Sramik Awami League, abbreviated as BaKSAL, was a political party established in 1983 by expelled members of the Bangladesh Awami League. Abdur Razzaq was the founder of this party. In the 2022 meeting of the Central Executive Parliament of Bangladesh Awami League, politicians admitted that after the creation of the BaKSAL, the party faced loss.

== Background ==
There was a party under the same name. Bangladesh Krishak Sramik Awami League (BaKSAL) was a political front comprising the Bangladesh Awami League, the Communist Party of Bangladesh, the National Awami Party (Muzaffar), and Bangladesh Jatiya League. Following the Fourth Amendment to the Constitution of Bangladesh, enacted on 25 January 1975, Sheikh Mujibur Rahman formed BaKSAL on 24 February. A presidential order also outlawed all political parties other than BaKSAL, creating a state of emergency and obligating other parties to join the front. The party advocated for democratic socialism as a part of reforms under the theory of the Second Revolution, which BaKSAL worked to achieve the objectives of. Although BaKSAL was put into effect during September 1975, the assassination of Sheikh Mujibur Rahman and most of his family members eventually led to the party's dissolution. As a result, all the political parties that merged with BaKSAL became independent again.

== History ==
On 25 March 1983, Hussain Muhammad Ershad, the then chief martial law administrator of the country, said that political activities would be allowed from 1 April 1983. In June 1983, accusations were made against Abdur Razzaq in an Awami League party meeting at the residence of Sheikh Mujibur Rahman. On 2 August 1983, Abdur Razzaq and Mohiuddin Ahmed were expelled from the party with four additional members. On 22 October 1983, they created a new political party under the name Bangladesh Krishak Sramik Awami League. Mohiuddin Ahmed became president, and Abdur Razzaq became general secretary of the newly founded party. Awami League politician Abu Sayeed also joined the party. It was affiliated with the 8-party alliance that time. The party participated in the 1986 and 1991 general elections; in 1986, the party's symbol was a boat, while it was a bicycle in 1991. On 14 August 1991, the party decided to merge into the Bangladesh Awami League, and the next day, when Mourning National Day was celebrated by Awami League, all BaKSAL members joined the party.

== Revival ==
After the party was merged into Awami League, there were several attempts to revive it by a group of its former members. There was an attempt to get registration of a political party under the same name before the 2008 Bangladeshi general election. In 2014, Kazi Mohammad Zahirul Qayyum, a self-claimed supporter of Mujibism, applied for registration of a political party under the name BaKSAL, claiming himself as its secretary general. In 2015, it became affiliated with the Bangladesh National Alliance formed by Nazmul Huda.

== Election results ==
=== Jatiya Sangsad elections ===
Election	Party leader	Votes	%	Seats	+/–	Position	Government
1986	Mohiuddin Ahmed	191,107	0.67%	3 / 300	▲3	10th	Opposition
1988	Mohiuddin Ahmed	Boycotted		0 / 300	▼3	—N/a	Extra-parliamentary
1991	Mohiuddin Ahmed	616,014	1.81%	5 / 300	▲5	▲5th	Opposition
