= Mathbaria Upazila =

Mathbaria মঠবাড়িয়া
- Upazila
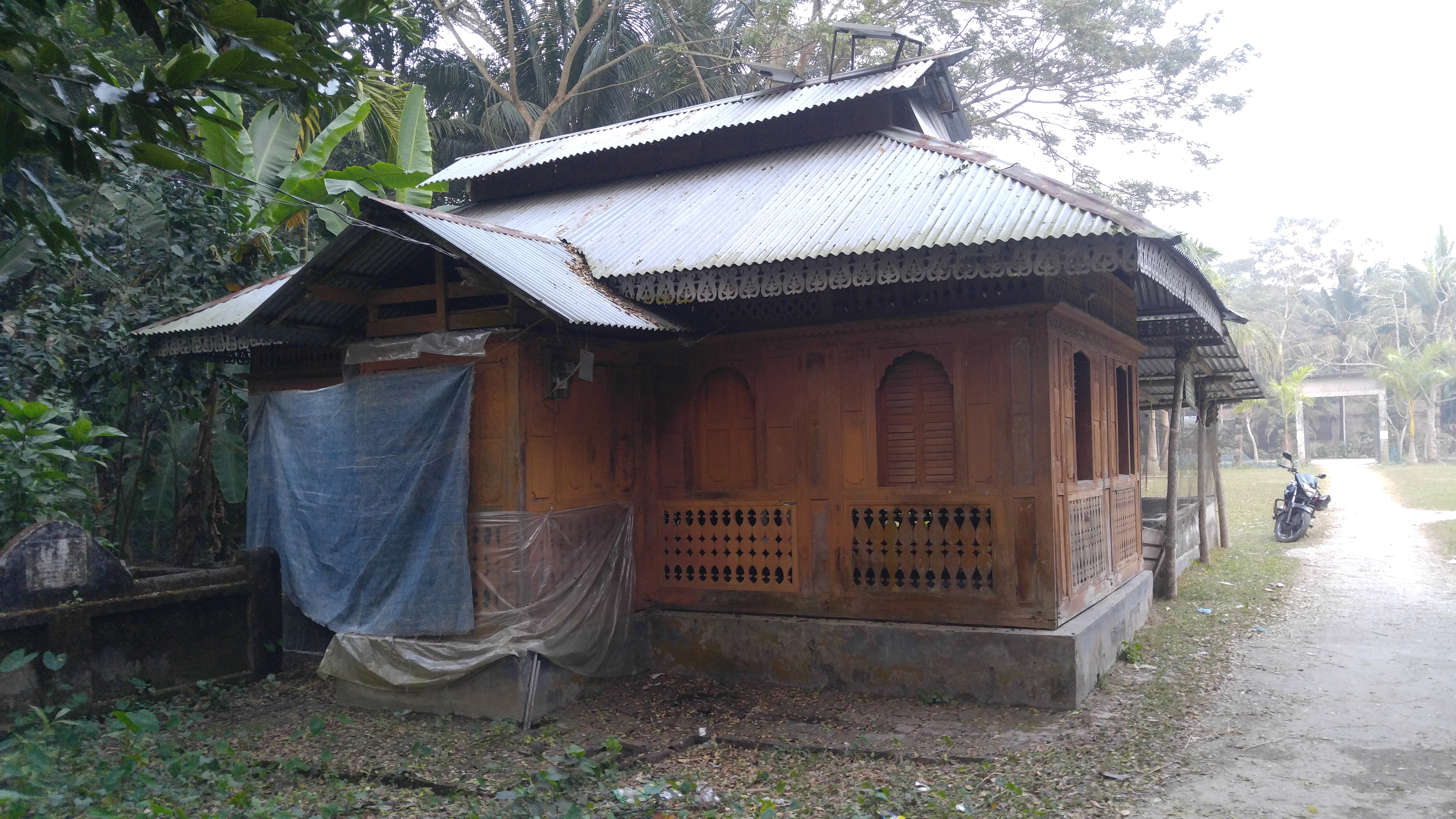
- Momin Mosque

- Coordinates: 22°17.2′N 89°58′E
- Country: Bangladesh
- Division: Barisal
- District: Pirojpur
- Headquarters: Mathbaria

Area
  - Total: 344.23 km^{2} (132.91 sq mi)

Population (2022)
  - Total: 277,627
  - Density: 806.52/km^{2} (2,088.9/sq mi)
- Time zone: UTC+6 (BST)
- Postal code: 8560
- Area code: 04625

Mathbaria Upazila mauza geocode map

Mathbaria (Bengali: মঠবাড়িয়া) is an upazila consisting of eleven unions under Pirojpur district under Barisal Division.

== Geography ==
Mathbaria is located at 22.2869°N 89.9667°E. It has a total area of 344.23 km^{2}.

== History ==
The ancient history of Mathbaria dates back to the Mughal period. Subedar Murshid Quli Khan sent Aga Baker Khan to Kirtan Khola in the area of Chandradwip which was named Baker Ganj after him. It was named Mathbaria after the Hindu-dominated Math of Mathbaria in a lower area in the Mauza of Baker Ganj. Mathbaria police station was established in 1904. Mathbaria upazila currently has 1 municipality and 11 unions. The ancient history of Mathbaria has developed since the Mughal era. The Subedar Murshid Quli Khan sent Aga Baker Khan to name a location near the Kirtankhola River, which later became known as Bakerganj. In the Hindu-populated area here, it was named Mathbaria, Mathbaria Thana was established in 1904. currently, Mathbaria Upazila has 1 municipality and 11 unions.

Notable figures in Mathbaria's history include Mahyuddin Ahmed, Shaheed Noor Hossain, and Major (Retd) Mehedi Ali Imam. Significant water bodies in the area include the Baleshwari, Kocha, and Pona rivers.

The literacy rate is 62.8%, with a notable number of colleges, secondary schools, and primary schools. The primary source of income for the population is agriculture.

Local markets and fairs are significant. The electricity and drinking water supply systems in the upazila are improving, but the sanitation and health center conditions need enhancement.

== Demographics ==
Religions in Mathbaria Upazila (2022)
Religion	Percent
Islam	90.72%
Hinduism	9.27%
Other or not stated	0.01%

According to the 2022 Bangladeshi census, Mathbaria Upazila had 71,075 households and a population of 277,627. 9.34% of the population were under 5 years of age. Mathbaria had a literacy rate (age 7 and over) of 84.95%: 84.89% for males and 85.00% for females, and a sex ratio of 89.79 males for every 100 females. 42,744 (15.40%) lived in urban areas.

According to the 2011 Census of Bangladesh, Mathbaria Upazila had 61,187 households and a population of 262,841. 58,216 (22.15%) were under 10 years of age. Mathbaria has a literacy rate (age 7 and over) of 61.7%, compared to the national average of 51.8%, and a sex ratio of 1,040 females per 1,000 males. 48,024 (22.76%) lived in urban areas.

== Administration ==
UNO: Abdul Kaium

Mathbaria Upazila is divided into Mathbaria Municipality and 11 union parishads: Amragasia, Betmor Rajpara, Boromasua, Daudkhali, Dhanishafa, Gulishakhali, Mathbaria, Mirukhali, Shapleza, Tikikata, and Tuskhali. The union parishads are subdivided into 67 mauzas and 93 villages.

Mathbaria Municipality is subdivided into 9 wards and 16 mahallas.

== Notable people ==
- Hatem Ali Jamadar (1872–1982), member of the Bengal Legislative Assembly
- Shamim Shahnawaz, former MP
- Nasir Khan, Bangladeshi film actor

== See also ==
- Upazilas of Bangladesh
- Districts of Bangladesh
- Divisions of Bangladesh
- Administrative geography of Bangladesh
