= Patharghata Upazila =

Administrative division in Bangladesh

Patharghata Upazila পাথরঘাটা উপজেলা
- Upazila
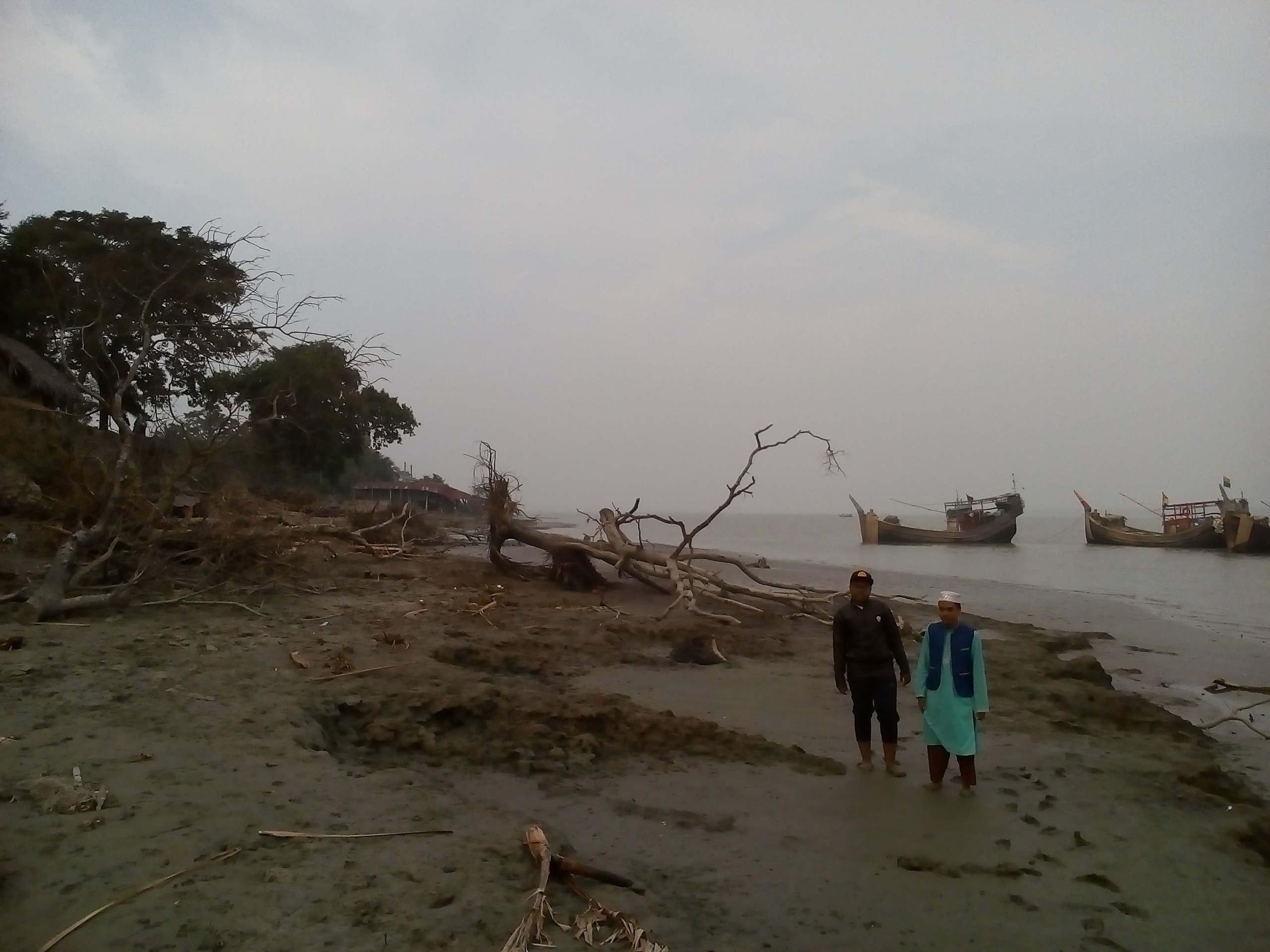
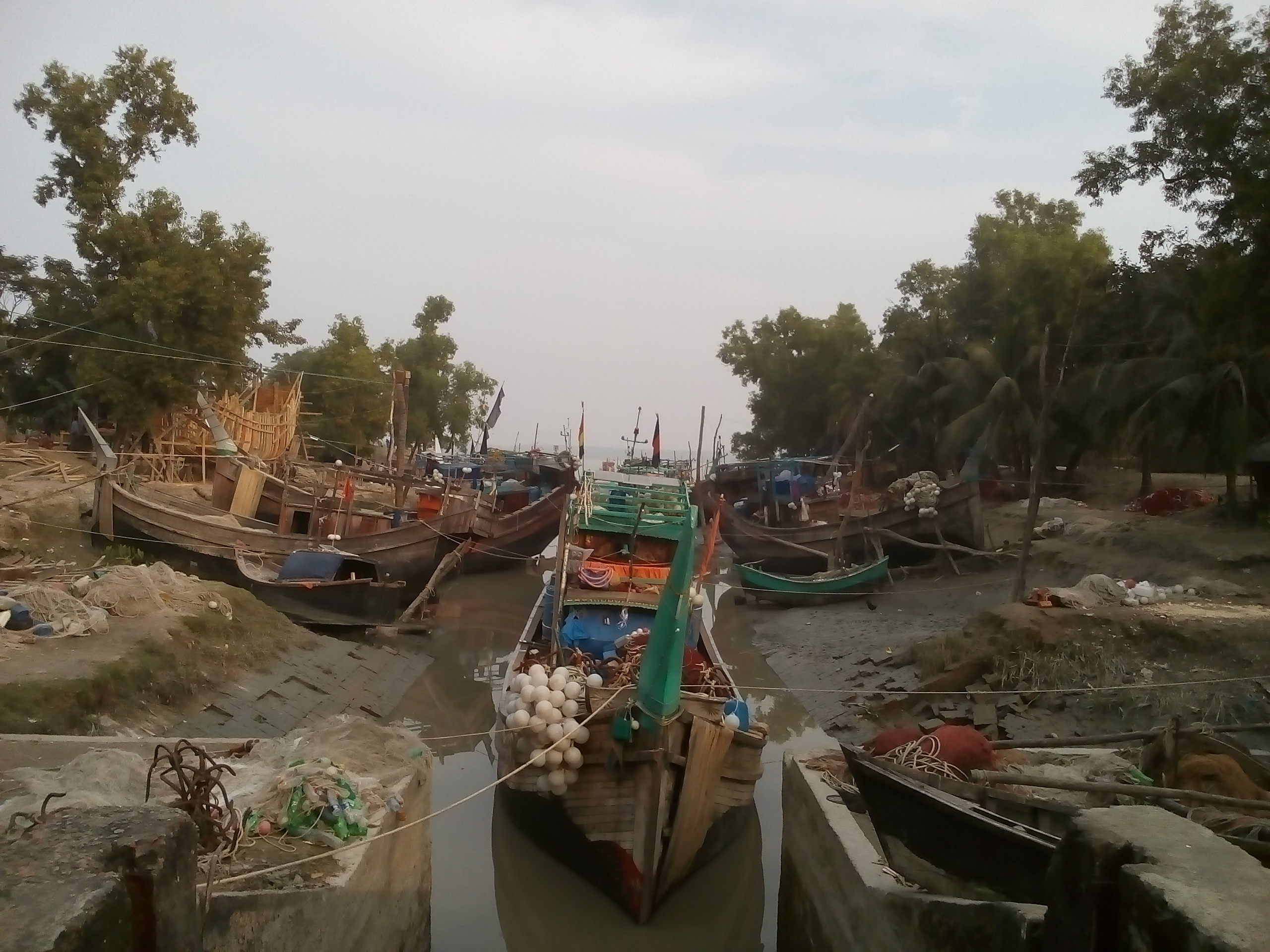
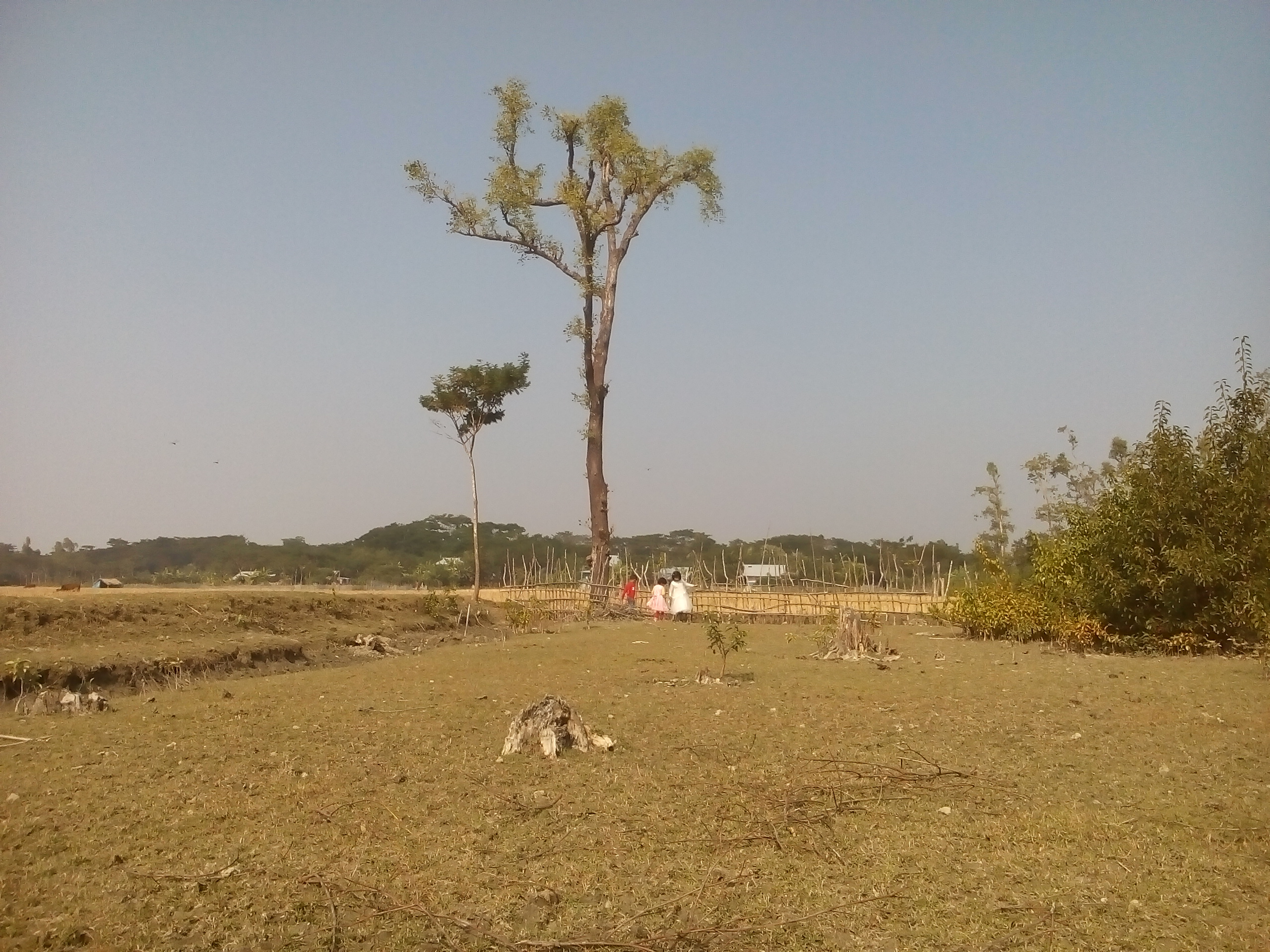
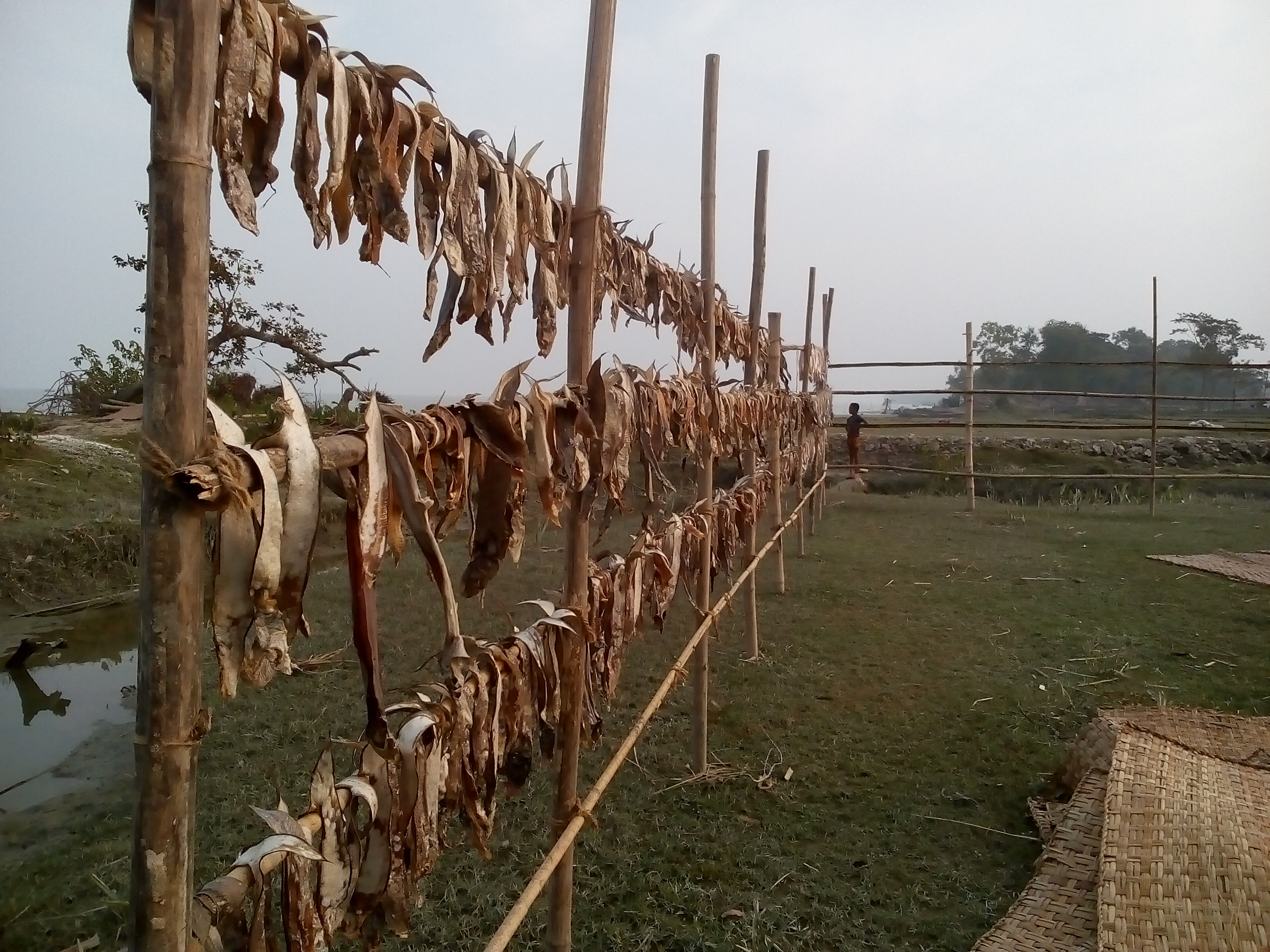
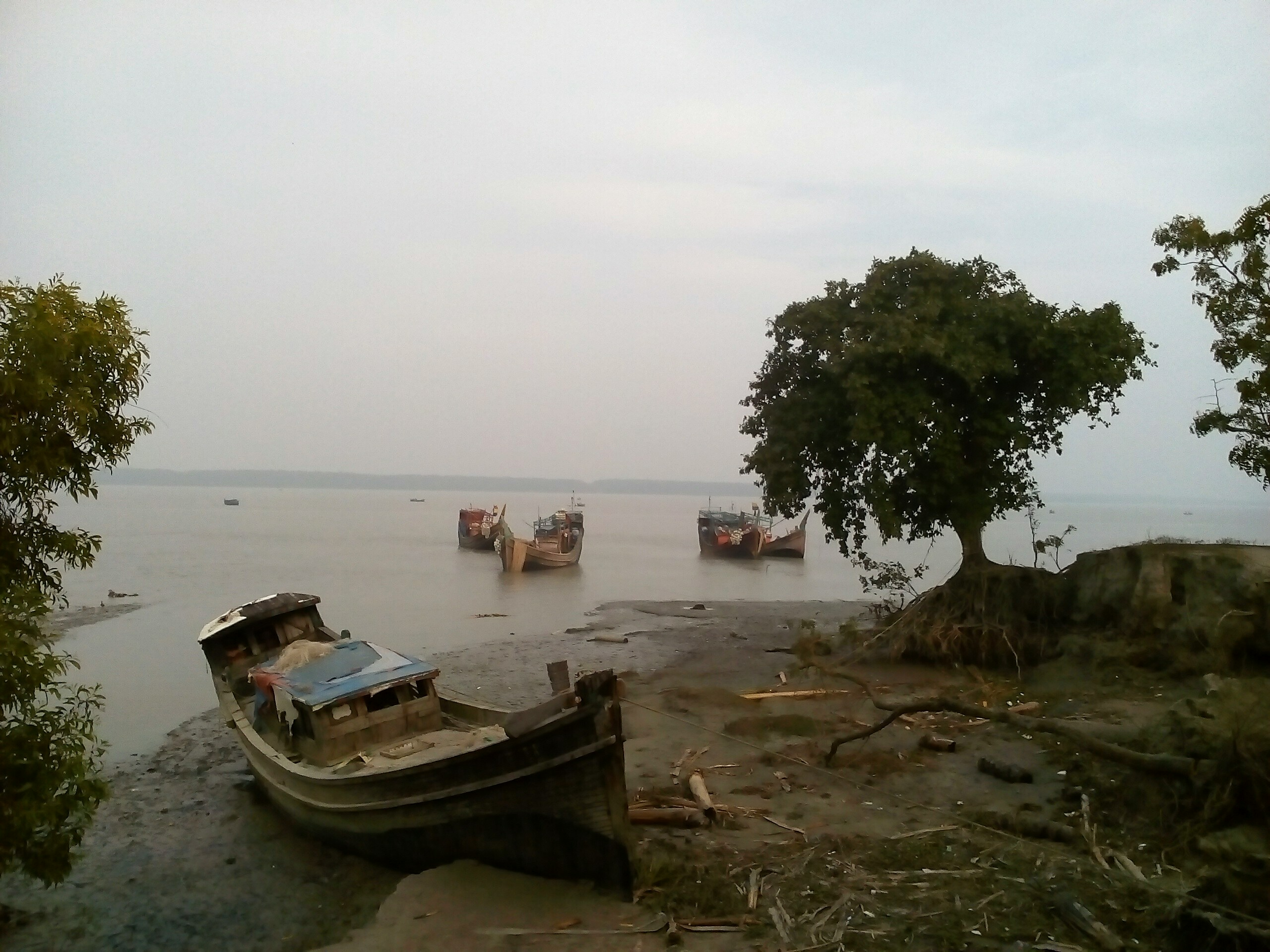
- Notable Places in Patharghata upazila

- Coordinates: 22°2.7′N 89°58.1′E
- Country: Bangladesh
- Division: Barisal Division
- District: Barguna District

Area
  - Total: 387.36 km^{2} (149.56 sq mi)

Population (2022)
  - Total: 177,893
  - Density: 459.24/km^{2} (1,189.4/sq mi)
- Time zone: UTC+6 (BST)
- Postal code: 8720
- Area code: 04455
- Website: Official Map of the Patharghata Upazila

Patharghata Upazila mauza geocode map

Patharghata (Bengali: পাথরঘাটা উপজেলা) is a coastal sub-district (upazila) within the Barguna District in Barisal Division, Bangladesh.

== Climate ==
Patharghata Upazila

Climate chart (precipitation, max. and min. temperature)
J	F	M	A	M	J	J	A	S	O	N	D
6 23 15	27 25 17	36 30 21	68 28 23	424 28 23	541 26 24	559 26 19	461 25 25	448 27 25	282 25 24	18 27 21	4 23 17
- █ Average max. and min. temperatures in °C
- █ Precipitation totals in mm
Imperial conversion
J	F	M	A	M	J	J	A	S	O	N	D
0.2 73 59	1.1 77 63	1.4 86 70	2.7 82 73	17 82 73	21 79 75	22 79 66	18 77 77	18 81 77	11 77 75	0.7 81 70	0.2 73 63
- █ Average max. and min. temperatures in °F
- █ Precipitation totals in inches

== Geography ==
Patharghata is located at 22.0458°N 89.9689°E. It has a total area of 387.36 km^{2}. It is one of six upazilas in the Barguna District, situated at the very south of the district. To the north of Patharghata Upazila, lies Bamna Upazila and Mathbaria Upazila of Pirojpur District, to the south is the Bay of Bengal, to the east are Barguna Sadar Upazila and the Bishkhali River, and to the west are Sharankhola Upazila of Bagerhat District and the Harinaghata River. The upazila has been recognized by the Government of Bangladesh as a char (riverine island), remote, and coastal area, and has been incorporated into the government's revenue sector.

== Economy ==
The upazila, developed after clearing parts of the Sundarbans, covers an area of 387.36 square kilometers. It is home to the Tengragiri Wildlife Sanctuary, the second largest breathable forest in Bangladesh after the Sundarbans. This area is predominantly agricultural. Nonetheless, its economy is indirectly dependent on marine fisheries. The upazila has facilities for fish landing and wholesale fish trading.

== Background ==
During the British rule, for administrative convenience, the Patuakhali subdivision was created in 1871. At that time, this subdivision included the areas of Patuakhali, Mirzaganj, Gulishakhali, Bauphal, and Galachipa, totaling 5 police stations. Bamna and Patharghata were under the jurisdiction of Mathbaria Thana. At that time, Barguna was within the Gulishakhali Thana. Later, towards the end of the century, for administrative convenience, the police stations of Bamna, Patharghata, Barguna, Betagi, and Khepupara were established. For the first time, Barguna appeared on the map through the naming of these police stations.

In the fourteenth century, the entire southern region was under the jurisdiction of Bakerganj. In the mid-eighteenth century, Aga Bakar Khan was a notable figure in East Bengal. His zamindari was in Bakla Chandradwip. Patuakhali and Barisal were known as Bakla Chandradwip. For governance, the British government created Bakerganj District in 1797 following the 7th resolution, named after Aga Bakar Khan. To maintain peace and order and to counter pirate attacks, a temporary police outpost was constructed on the banks of the Bishkhali River in Fuljhuri in the early nineteenth century. Subsequently, as chars formed in the Bay of Bengal and cultivation began in the Sundarbans area, significant settlements developed.

In the early twentieth century, some people from the areas of Mathbaria, Bamna, and Betagi came here, cleared Sundari tree gardens, and began to settle. Later, the British government registered the land in the area in 1910. In 1913, a minor flood washed away the settlements in these areas. Later, in 1926, the British government brought merchants from Dhaka and Faridpur to establish businesses in Patharghata market, including tailor and sweet shops. After the end of British rule in 1947, the governance of this area came under the Bakerganj subdivision of the Patuakhali Sub-Division. Even though some road development took place in the area after independence in 1971, it was not until 1985 when the Ershad government introduced the upazila system that the area's road connectivity began to improve. Before this, the only means of communication in the area was through waterways using Pansi boats.

Once part of the Sundarbans forest area, Barguna gradually transformed into a densely populated area. Political, social, and cultural activities began in this area. Due to administrative convenience, increased size, and population growth, Barguna became a sub-district town in the historical records with the creation of the Patuakhali District in 1969. In 1915, Patharghata was a police station of the Pirojpur subdivision. Among the 10 police stations listed in the Pirojpur subdivision at that time, one was Patharghata. Kalapara, Amtali, Barguna, Betagi, and the Patharghata and Bamna police stations of the Pirojpur subdivision formed the Barguna subdivision. Later, due to the needs of the time, Barguna subdivision was upgraded to a district on February 28, 1984. Patharghata was upgraded to an upazila on March 24, 1983. The indigenous people had cleared large trees to establish settlements before this period. The roots of these trees can still be found underground, which the local people excavate for firewood.

== Demographics ==
Religions in Patharghata Upazila (2022)
Religion	Percent
Islam	90.53%
Hinduism	9.45%
Other or not stated	0.02%

According to the 2022 Bangladeshi census, Patharghata Upazila had 47,166 households and a population of 177,893. 9.15% of the population were under 5 years of age. Patharghata had a literacy rate (age 7 and over) of 84.67%: 85.23% for males and 84.16% for females, and a sex ratio of 93.19 males for every 100 females. 39,319 (22.10%) lived in urban areas.

According to the 2011 Census of Bangladesh, Patharghata Upazila had a population of 163,927 living in 43,085 households. 35,397 (21.59%) were under 10 years of age. Patharghata has a literacy rate (age 7 and over) of 60.5%, compared to the national average of 51.8%, and a sex ratio of 1038 females per 1000 males. 28,521 (17.40%) lived in urban areas.

As of the 1991 Bangladesh census, Patharghata has a population of 134635. Males constitute 50.56% of the population, and females 49.44%. This upazila's eighteen up population is 68,751. Patharghata has an average literacy rate of 66.4% (7+ years), and the national average of 32.4% literate.

== Administration ==
UNO: Md. Ruknuzzaman Khan.

Patharghata Upazila is divided into Patharghata Municipality and seven union parishads: Char Duani, Kakchira, Kalmegha, Kathaltali, Nachnapara, Patharghata, and Raihanpur. The union parishads are subdivided into 42 mauzas and 66 villages.

Patharghata Municipality is subdivided into 9 wards and 9 mahallas.

- Charduani
- Kakchira
- Kalmegha
- Kanthaltali
- Nachna Para
- Patharghata
- Raihanpur

== See also ==
- Upazilas of Bangladesh
- Districts of Bangladesh
- Divisions of Bangladesh
- Thanas of Bangladesh
- Administrative geography of Bangladesh
- Union councils of Bangladesh
