= List of islands of Bangladesh =

This is a list of Islands of Bangladesh.

The islands of Bangladesh are scattered along the Bay of Bengal and the river mouth of the Padma. The word "Char" is used in many of the names and refers to floodplain sediment islands in the Ganges Delta. Many large rivers originated from the Himalayas carry a high level of sediment and it accumulates across the shoreline of Bay of Bengal, Bangladesh. This has led to significant changes in the morphology of the coastal area, including the development of the new Islands.

== Western Bay of Bengal ==
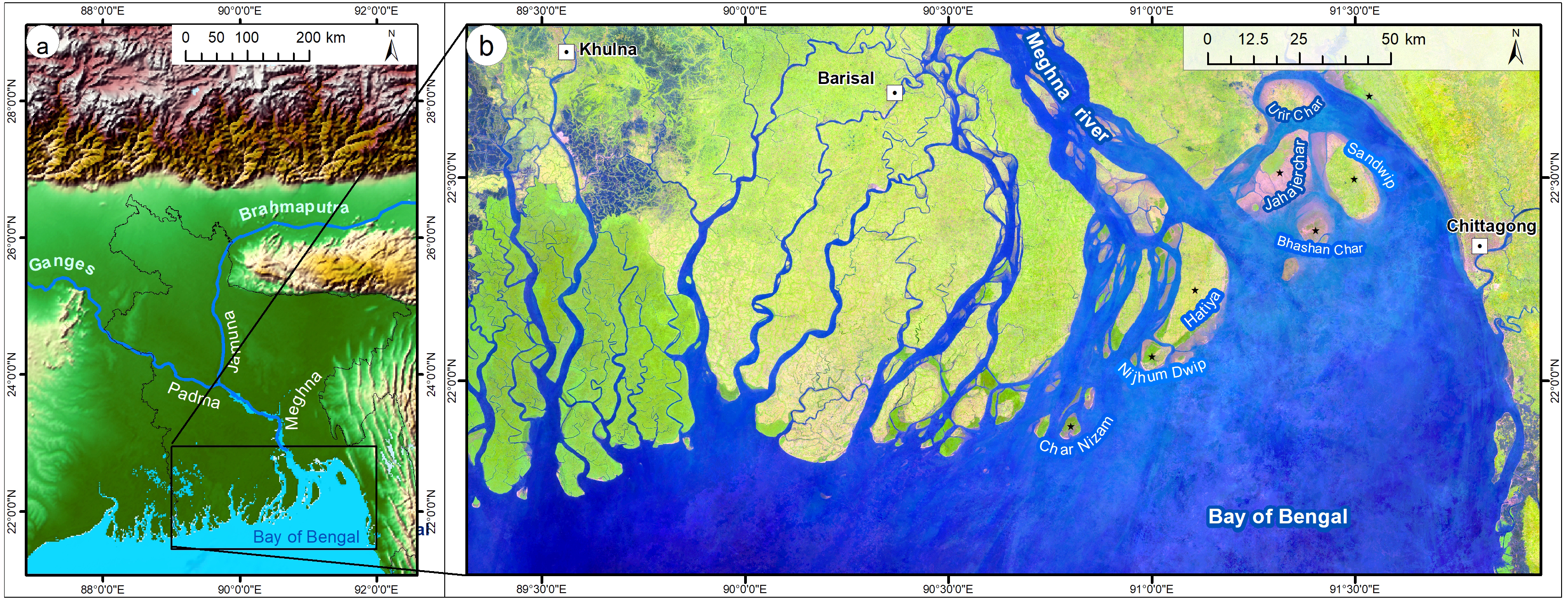
Mountain originated river flow out to the northern Bay of Bengal, which creates the greatest riverine delta on earth.

- Ashar Char
- Andar Char
- Rangabali
- Dublar Char
- Bangabandhu Island
- Burir Char
- Char Hare
- Char Lakhsmi/Birshreshta Hamid Island
- Char Manika
- Ramnabad Island
- Char Mantaz
- Pakhkhir Char
- Dimer Char
- Char Bagala
- Char Kashem
- Char Tufania
- Char Bijoy

== Northern Bay of Bengal ==
- Bhola Island, the country's largest island
- Sandwip, a large island in Chittagong District
- Urirchar
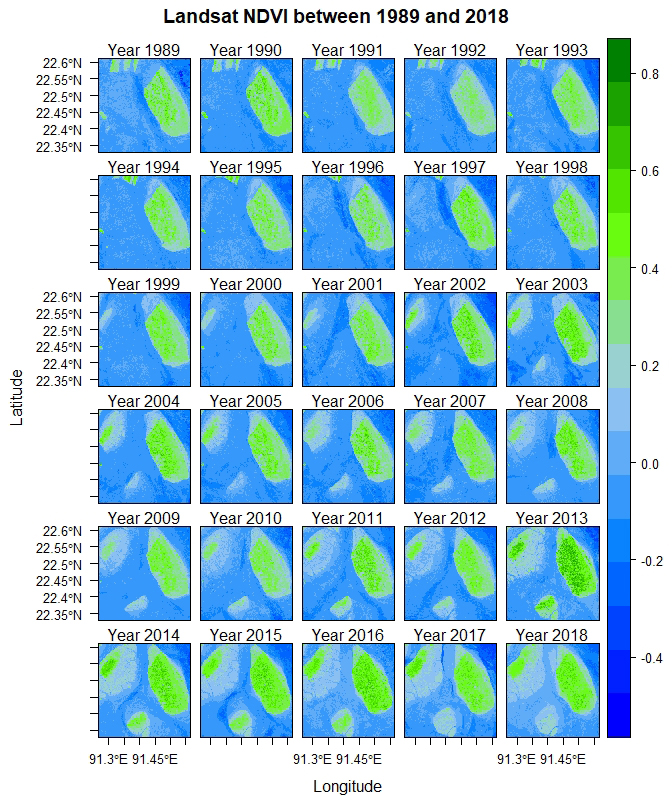
  Vegetation succession at the Bhashan Char, Jahajer char, and Sandwip islands
- Bhasan Char
- Swarna Dweep (Jahajer Chor/ Jahejjar chor)
- Hatiya
- Nijhum Dwip
- Manpura Island
- Dal Char
- Char Nizam
- Char Kukri Mukri
- Char Lakshmi
- Ballar Char
- Char Sakuchia
- Char Montaz
- Char Gazi
- Char Faizuddin

== Eastern Bay of Bengal ==
- Kutubdia Dwip
- Matarbari Island
- Maheshkhali Island
- Sonadia
- Jaliadwip
- St. Martin's Island
- Chhera island (extension of St. Martin's Island)
- Shah Porir Dwip

== Disappeared islands ==
Islands that were previously existent but have now disappeared.

- Bholar Dweep, a small islet situated between Teknaf and St. Martin's Island, disappeared in 1861.
- South Talpatti Island was disputed between India and Bangladesh. The Associated Press reported it submerged by March 2010.
