= Amtali Upazila =

Administrative division in Bangladesh

Amtali আমতলী
- Upazila
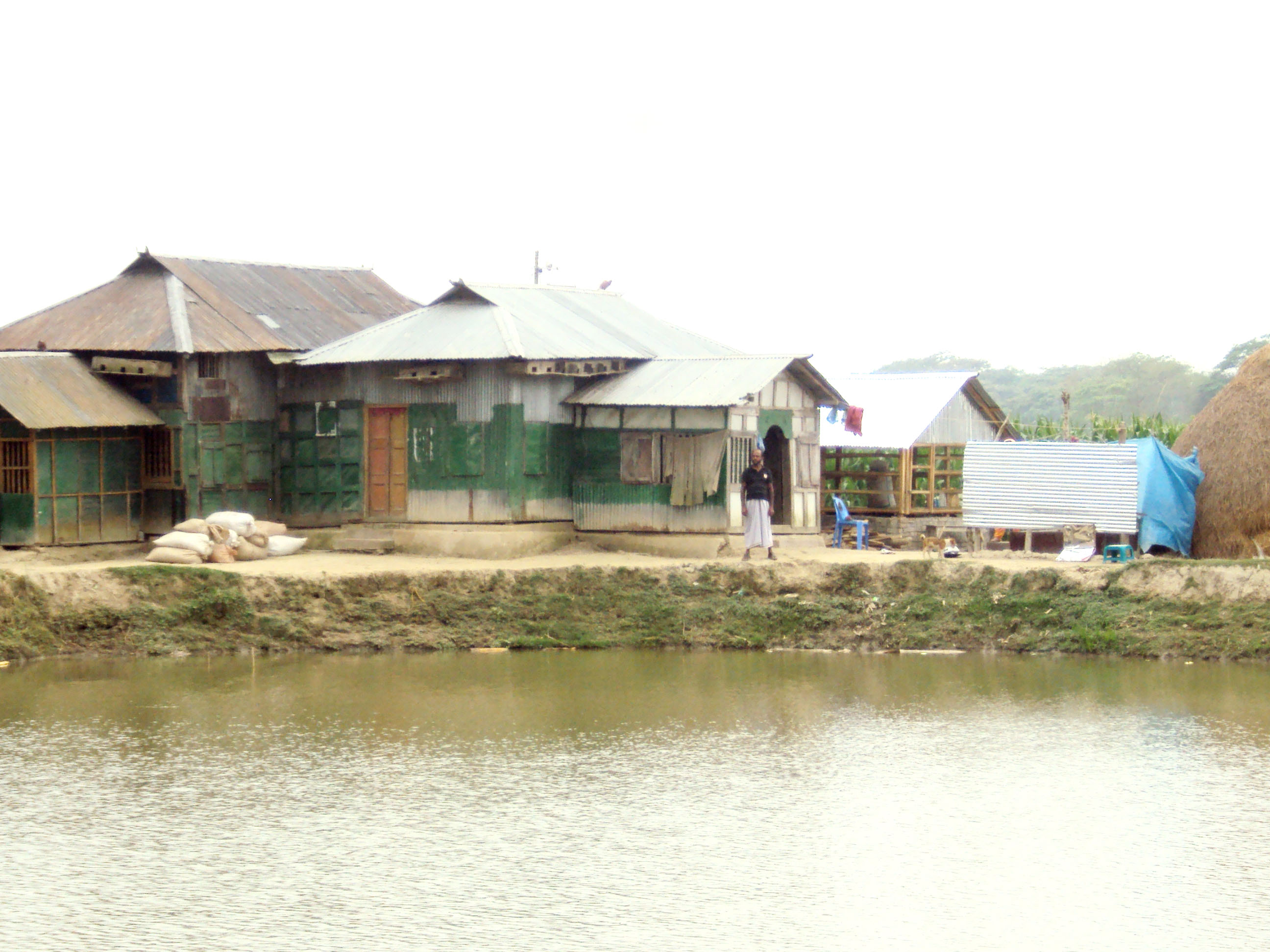
- A house in a village of Amtali

- Coordinates: 22°7.764′N 90°13.734′E
- Country: Bangladesh
- Division: Barisal Division
- District: Barguna District

Area
  - Total: 386.92 km^{2} (149.39 sq mi)

Population (2022)
  - Total: 214,446
  - Density: 554.24/km^{2} (1,435.5/sq mi)
- Time zone: UTC+6 (BST)
- Postal code: 8710
- Website: Official Map of the Amtali Upazila

Amtali Upazila mauza geocode map

Amtali (Bengali: আমতলী) is the easternmost upazila of Barguna District in Barisal Division, Bangladesh.

== Etymology ==
The name “Amtali” is of Bengali origin and is commonly interpreted as meaning “the place beneath the mango trees.” Since ancient times the banks of the Payra River were lined with numerous mango trees. Boatmen used to tie their boats to the trunks of these trees. Over time, the place where boats were moored under the shade of the mango trees came to be known as “Amtala”, and later “Amtali.” Another explanation connects the name to the Amtali River, a branch of the Payra that once flowed from north to south along the eastern side of the present Amtali port. A different local legend offers that when Amtali was still a forest-covered and remote area, a Magh leader from Arakan named Ampati obtained a lease from the British Raj and began cultivating here. It is therefore also thought that the name “Amtali” may have originated from the name of Ampati Magh.

== History ==
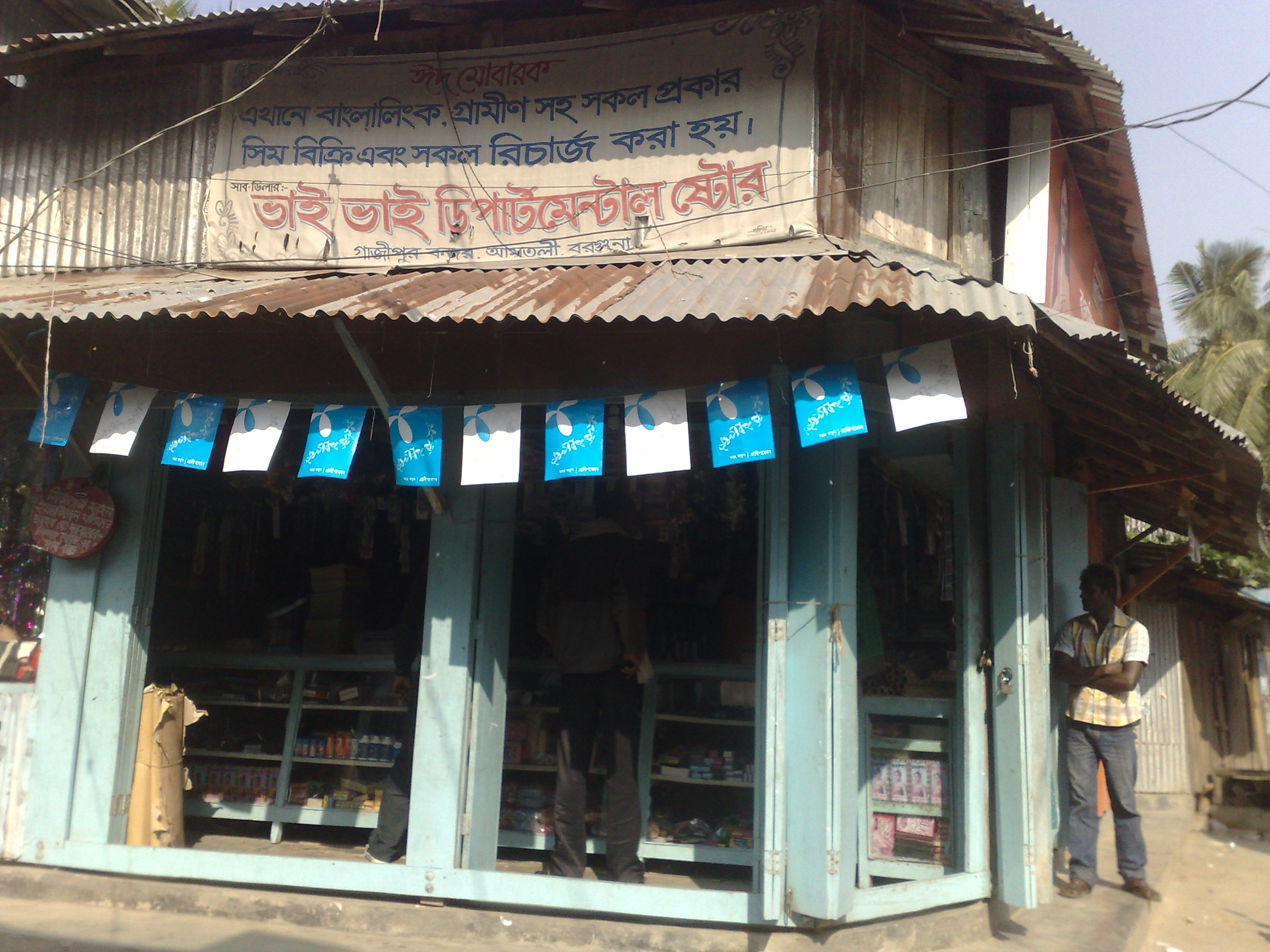
Ghazipur Bandar, Amtali

The South Tepura mouza in Haldia Union, Amtali Upazila is home to the dargah of Ghazi and Kalu. Nearby stands a brick-built enclosure (indira), and a short distance away lies the site where their disciples, known as the Twelve Awliya, are believed to have gathered. During the reign of Mughal emperor Jahangir, the Muslim population in greater Patuakhali began to increase as many Sufi pirs and awliya from Arabia, Iran and Iraq came to propagate Islam in the region. The village of Faqirkhali is home to a large reservoir and lofty hill which is understood to have been excavated and used as a khanqah by one of these missionary faqirs. The village of Gunaighar hosts the mazar (mausoleum) of Rahman Faqir, Mashakira village hosts the mazar of Kawthar Dawlat Shah Faqir and Ponra village is home to the mazar of Mainuddin Faqir.

Amtali had a historical importance in the coastal defence network of the Bengal Subah during the Mughal period. In the 17th century, the area suffered repeated raids by Magh and Portuguese pirates which started to depopulate vast areas of the lower delta, and it is known that there once existed a Portuguese fort at Khepupara, near Amtali. This prompted Mughal authorities to establish an earthen fort in the village of Patakata in Chaora Union, Amtali for protection and counterattack. It was strategically situated on the Chaora River, which once extended nearly 20 kilometres and served as an important inland waterway. Over time, the river’s course changed and its strong current diminished, leaving behind only a large earthen mound that marks the remnants of the earlier defensive fortification. It is generally thought to have been constructed under Subahdar Shaista Khan of Bengal, perhaps under the initiative of his son Buzurg Umed Khan. However, other historians alternatively attributed its establishment to the defensive initiatives undertaken by Prince Shah Shuja or Faujdar Agha Baqer Khan. During the reign of Emperor Aurangzeb, Amtali was placed under the Aurangpur pargana.

During the Konbaung conquest of Arakan in 1785, the Buddhist Maghs of Rakhine fled to Baliatali in Amtali and began to settle there. Amtali was also home to the Mians of Bighai, a Muslim taluqdar clan of wealthy fish traders that had risen to prominence. They were awarded a taluq and settled near the Bighai Haat (present-day Patuakhali Sadar). During the colonial period, a minor by the name of Mufizuddin Chowdhury had become the head of the family. The estate was misappropriated by Chowdhury's naib, Ishwar Chandra Dutta, and the remaining portions were sold off to Mr. Brown in order to cover debts. Despite these upheavals, Chowdhury's three daughters of continue to reside in their ancestral home, the Miah Bari of Bighai.

In 1853, a thana was founded by the British Raj in Gulishakhali village on the banks of the Payra. The Gulishakhali Thana administered present-day Amtali, Kalapara and Patuakhali Sadar. In 1871, it was included within the Patuakhali subdivision. The headquarters of the Gulishakhali Thana was changed to Amtali in 1901 due to river corrosion and was renamed to Amtali Thana in 1944. On 12 November 1970, Amtali was affected by the Great Cyclone, which resulted in the loss of many lives, livestock and crops. During the Bangladesh Liberation War of 1971, Amtali was pretty much always under the control of the Bengali freedom fighters. C.I. Police Officer Anwar Hossain of Barguna, accompanied by a contingent of loyal police personnel, sought refuge at the Amtali Thana. On the night of 12 December 1971, Abdur Rabb of Galachipa, leading his armed unit, launched an assault on the Amtali Thana from the premises of the A.K. School. Accompanying him in the operation were several prominent local leaders, including Amtali Awami League secretary Afazuddin Bishwas,, Nurul Islam Talukder Pasha, Moin Talukder, Nizam Uddin Ahmed Talukdar, and Qutubuddin Talukder, among others. Following intense fighting that continued throughout the night, the police of Pakistan and Razakar forces stationed at Amtali surrendered through the mediation of Amtali Awami League President Asmat Ali Akon. Subsequently, C.I. Police Officer Anwar Hossain and Sub-Inspector Rois Bhuiyan were executed. The status of Amtali Thana was upgraded to upazila (sub-district) in 1983 as part of the President of Bangladesh Hussain Muhammad Ershad's decentralisation programme and included within the Barguna District (formerly part of the Greater Patuakhali district).

On 25 April 2012, Amtali was partitioned with the southern portion now forming the Taltali Upazila.

== Geography ==
Amtali is at 22.1294°N 90.2289°E, in the southern coastal zone of Bangladesh. It borders the Barguna Sadar and Mirzaganj upazilas to its west, Patuakhali Sadar to its north, the Galachipa and Kalapara upazilas to its east and the Bay of Bengal on the south. It has a total area of 695 square kilometers with 212 square km covered by water bodies.

The Burishwar River (also called the Payra River), Andharmanik River, and the Ramnabad Channel are among the principal watercourses influencing Amtali’s geography. Within the Amtali municipal area, approximately 1.5 kilometres of the Payra riverbank has been reinforced with concrete embankments, protecting the township from tidal erosion and storm surges. During the summer and winter seasons, the area becomes lively with travelers and picnic groups arriving from different parts of the region to enjoy the Payra riverside scenery.

== Demographics ==
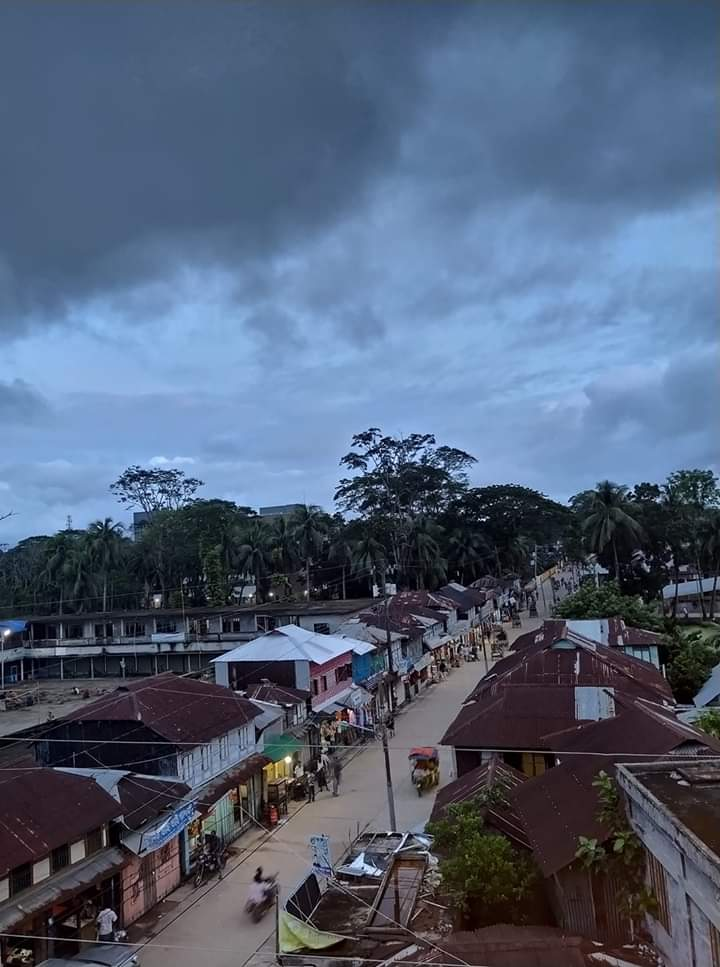
A bazaar in Amtali.

Amtali Upazila has 45,804 households.

Historical population
Year	Pop. (000)	±%
1981	232	—
1991	244	+5.2%
2001	260	+6.6%
2011	271	+4.2%
Source: Bangladesh Bureau of Statistics

Religions in Amtali Upazila (2022)
Religion	Percent
Islam	95.13%
Hinduism	4.86%
Other or not stated	0.01%

According to the 2022 Bangladeshi census, Amtali Upazila had 53,556 households and a population of 214,446. 8.93% of the population were under 5 years of age. Amtali had a literacy rate (age 7 and over) of 73.23%: 75.38% for males and 71.20% for females, and a sex ratio of 95.67 males for every 100 females. 40,891 (19.07%) lived in urban areas.

As of the 2011 Census of Bangladesh, Amtali has a population of 182,798 living in 42,201 households. Amtali has an average literacy rate of 51.73% (7+ years) and a sex ratio of 1,066 females per 1,000 males. 21,808 (11.93%) of the population lived in urban areas.

== Administration ==
UNO: Md. Ashraful Alam

Amtali Upazila is divided into Amtali Municipality and one thana known as Amtali Thana and seven union parishads: Amtali, Arpangasia, Atharogasia, Chaora, Gulishakhali, Haldia, and Kukua.

Amtali Municipality is subdivided into 9 wards and 14 mahallas.

== Notable people ==
- Nizam Uddin Ahmed Talukdar (1948–1990), politician and MP for Patuakhali-5 and Barguna-3
- Mujibur Rahman Talukder (died 2001), MP for Barguna-3
- M. Motiur Rahman Talukdar, MP for Barguna-3
- Abdul Majid Mallick, MP for Barguna-3

== See also ==
- Upazilas of Bangladesh
- Districts of Bangladesh
- Divisions of Bangladesh
- Administrative geography of Bangladesh
