= Amtali =

Amtali may refer to:

== Bangladesh ==
- Amtali Upazila, an upazila of Barisal District
- Amtali, Barisal, a town in Barisal Division

== India ==
- Amtali, Agartala, India
