= Ashar Char =

Island in Bangladesh

Geography
- Location: Bay of Bengal

Administration
- Bangladesh
- Division: Barisal Division
- District: Barguna District
- Upazila: Amtali Upazila

Demographics
- Population: small (declining)

Ashar Char is a two-mile-long island in the western Bay of Bengal, located along the path of the Pyra river in the Taltali Upazila, Barguna District of Bangladesh.

== History ==
In the aftermath of Cyclone Sidr in 2007, Ashar Char and other remote islands in the Barguna and Patuakhali districts were left isolated, with limited access to relief, drinking water, and medical supplies. Survivors in Ashar Char reported consuming seaweed, leaves, and banana tree cores due to the absence of food aid. While relief reached some larger and more accessible chars, many remote areas, including Ashar Char, Kauwar Char, Char Hair, Sonar Char, and Rupar Char, remained cut off, with survivors facing starvation and untreated injuries. Blocked roads and inadequate local response severely hampered the distribution of emergency assistance.

== Geography ==
A char is an island formed by the continuous shifting of a river.

== Population ==
In the past thousands of people lived on Ashar Char, but the island has been shrinking, and only a few hundred live there currently. The island was devastated by Cyclone Sidr in 2007. It is estimated that more than a thousand people died during the cyclone.

== Economy ==
Ashar Char is one of several coastal islands in Bhola District known for its seasonal production of dried fish, locally known as shutki, between October and March each year. As part of the one billion BDT industry in Charfesson and Manpura upazilas, Ashar Char contributes significantly to the national supply of dried fish, much of which is used in aquaculture feed across the country. The industry involves approximately 10,000 people.

Ashar Char is home to a reserved Kewra forest that has come under threat due to large-scale illegal deforestation. Reports indicate that thousands of Kewra trees have been felled by dried fish producers and traders, who have converted portions of the forest into fish drying zones.

== See also ==
- List of islands of Bangladesh
