= Siddiqur Rahman (Patuakhali politician) =

Bangladeshi politician

- সিদ্দিকুর রহমান

Member of the Bangladesh Parliament for Patuakhali-2
- In office 1979–1986
- Preceded by: Shahjada Abdul Malek Khan
- Succeeded by: Humayun Kabir Hiru

Personal details
- Born: 2 October 1951 Barguna, Backergunge District, East Bengal
- Died: 29 June 1986 (aged 34) Postgraduate Hospital, Dhaka, Bangladesh
- Cause of death: Sudden Mysterious death. Cause unknown.
- Resting place: Barguna District, Bangladesh
- Party: Awami League

Siddiqur Rahman (Bengali: সিদ্দিকুর রহমান; 2 October 1951 – 29 June 1986) was a politician of Barguna District of Bangladesh and member of parliament for then Patuakhali-2 constituency, which currently is Barguna-1, in 1979. He was a freedom fighter in the 1971 independence war.

== Early life and education ==
Siddiqur Rahman was born on 2 October 1951 to a Bengali Muslim family in the village of Roadpara in Barguna, Backergunge District, East Bengal, Dominion of Pakistan. He completed his matriculation from Nali Middle School, and his Intermediate of Arts and Bachelor of Arts from Patuakhali College, where he served as vice-president of its students union. His speech had a hypnotic power due to which he became a favorite of Sheikh Mujibur Rahman at a very young age.

== Career ==
Siddiqur Rahman was president of the Chhatra League's Barguna branch from 1970 to 1971. He assisted Asmat Ali Sikder in organising the Barisailla freedom fighters for the Bangladesh Liberation War. When the armed liberation war started in Barguna subdivision and training started in every police station. The youth of Barguna started training with all the students of Chhatra League and Chhatra Union in the field and treasury field of Barguna police station. After 26 March, the Pak army attacked Barguna. Kills innocent people in prisons and brutally tortures women. Similarly, the Pakistani aggressors killed and tortured in other police stations. The freedom-loving youths organized at that time left the city and went into hiding and formed groups of freedom fighters under the leadership of Siddiqur Rahman in different areas. He led a group of freedom fighters in entering into West Bengal via the Sundarbans.

When the erstwhile subdivisional officer of Barguna, Sirajuddin Ahmad, organized resistance in Barguna Subdivision in protest against the Assassination of Sheikh Mujibur Rahman on August 15, 1975, Siddiqur Rahman prepared for armed conflict in cooperation with the Jatiya Rakkhi Bahini paramilitary force. He was arrested by the Government of Bangladesh shortly after for a long while. During the 1979 Bangladeshi general election, Siddiqur Rahman was elected to the Patuakhali-2 (Barguna-Betagi) constituency as an Awami League (Mizan) candidate.

== Death ==
He died prematurely at Postgraduate Hospital, Dhaka on June 29, 1986 at 11 pm. He was buried in a public graveyard in Barguna.
