= Galachipa Upazila =

Galachipa গলাচিপা
- Upazila
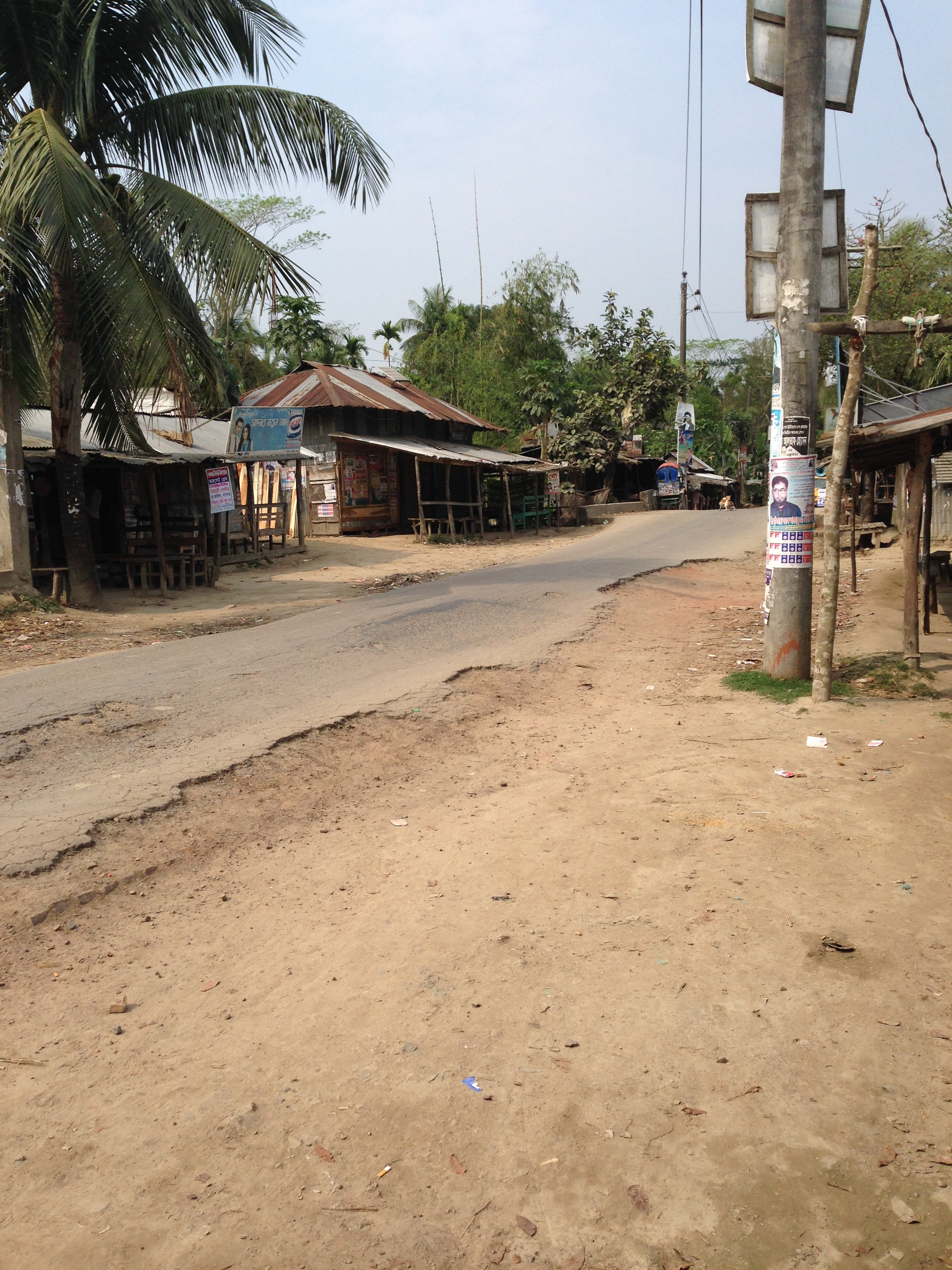
- Galachipa Bus stand

- Coordinates: 22°9.8′N 90°25.8′E
- Country: Bangladesh
- Division: Barisal
- District: Patuakhali
- Headquarters: Galachipa

Government
  - Chairman: Vacant

Area
  - Total: 924.68 km^{2} (357.02 sq mi)

Population (2022)
  - Total: 300,218
  - Density: 324.67/km^{2} (840.90/sq mi)
- Time zone: UTC+6 (BST)
- Postal code: 8640
- Area code: 04424
- Website: galachipa.patuakhali.gov.bd (in Bengali)

Galachipa (Bengali: গলাচিপা) is an upazila of Patuakhali District in Barisal Division, Bangladesh. In March 2011, part of the upazila was separated to make a new upazila, which is known as Rangabali Upazila.

== Geography ==
Galachipa is located at 22.1639°N 90.4306°E. It has 49,982 households and a total area of 1267.89 km^{2}. It is located along the southern coast and includes a few char areas.

=== Rivers ===
Galachipa Upazila has many rivers and canals. The Bay of Bengal is very close here. Galachipa town is situated on the bank of the Ramnabad River. Due to the river, Galachipa is a famous port for rice and other crops. A large Haat takes place every Saturday based on the river. It is one of the largest Haats of greater Barisal. Other famous rivers of Galachipa are Agunmukha, and Bura Gaurang.

=== Sonar Char ===
Galachipa Upzilla is famous for her "Sonarchar". "Char" means land disconnected from the mainland by rivers. These lands are highly disconnected and the river route is the only route. Road traffic has not been arranged yet. Some chars are larger while some are very much smaller.

Most Char areas are now split off into their own upazila: Rangabali, Baher Char, Barho Baishdia, Choto Baishdia, Chalitabunia, Char Kajal, Char Shiba, Char Momtaj, Char Biswas, Mayar Char, Char Karfarma, Char Lakshmi, Char Kukri Mukri, Latar Char, Char Kalagachia, etc. are very known to all. The land of these chars is very fertile and crops grow heavily here. But most of the people here are poor and deprived. They also suffer from a lack of information greatly and their quality of life is very poor. The people here are mainly "Bhumiheen" (landless).

== Demographics ==
Religions in Galachipa Upazila (2022)
Religion	Percent
Islam	92.45%
Hinduism	7.54%
Other or not stated	0.01%

According to the 2022 Bangladeshi census, Galachipa Upazila had 74,964 households and a population of 300,218. 9.44% of the population were under 5 years of age. Galachipa had a literacy rate (age 7 and over) of 73.62%: 75.65% for males and 71.67% for females, and a sex ratio of 97.03 males for every 100 females. 43,975 (14.65%) lived in urban areas.

According to the 2011 Bangladeshi census, Galachipa Upazila had 258,515 people in 57,466 households. 64,626 (25.00%) were under 10 years of age. Galachipa has 126,631 males and 131,206 females for a sex ratio of 1,036 females per 1,000 males and a literacy rate of 47.27%. 25,917 (10.03%) lived in urban areas. 237,277 Muslims live in the area (91.78%) and 21,201 Hindus as well (8.20%).

According to the 1991 Bangladesh census, Galachipa has a population of 286,307. Males constituted 51.36% of the population, and females constituted 48.64%. This upazila's adult population is 137,818. Galachipa has an average literacy rate of 29.4% (7+ years), and a national average of 32.4% literate.

== Points of interest ==
Agunmukha river is situated at the side of Panpatty Union. It is the meet-point of several rivers.

== Administration ==
Galachipa Upazila is divided into Galachipa Municipality and 12 union parishads:

1. Galachipa Union
2. Amkhola Union
3. Char Biswas, Char Kajol (union)
4. Chiknikandi Union
5. Ratandi Taltali Union
6. Dakua Union
7. Galachipa Union
8. Gazalia Union
9. Golkhali Union
10. Kalagachhia Union
11. Panpatti Union
12. Bakulbaria Union

The union parishads are subdivided into 140 mazes and 227 villages.

Galachipa Municipality is subdivided into 9 wards and 9 mahallas.

== Education ==
Galachipa Upazila has several schools, madrasas, and colleges, they are:

1. Galachipa Govt. Model Secondary School
2. Galachipa Govt. Degree College
3. Galachipa Girls' Secondary School
4. Galachipa Women Degree College
5. Galachipa NZMA Alim Madrasha
6. Galachipa Ideal School & College
7. Ratandi Taltoli Secondary School
8. Udayan Pre-Cadet and Secondary School
9. Galachipa High School attached Primary School
10. Galachipa Girls High School attached Primary School
11. Patabunia High School
12. Patabunia Ideal Agricultural and Technical School
13. Lamna Polytechnic Institute
14. Uttor Purba Gazalia Dakhil Madrasha
15. Ulania Hat High School
16. Panpatty High School
17. Bango Bondhu Girls High School
18. Haridevpur High School
19. Haridebpur Secondary School
20. Charkhali Secondary School
21. North Chair Khali High School
22. Char Kazal High School
23. Char Kapal Bera Adarsha Secondary School
24. Chickni kandi High school
25. Shuhari High School
26. Chicknikandi High School & College
27. Chicknikandi Salehia Dakhil Madrasha
28. Chicknikandi Primary School
29. Kharizzama Ishak Secondary School
30. Kharizzama Degree College
31. Galachipa Polytechnic Institute

== Notable residents ==
- Habibur Rahman Mia, First MP in Independent Bangladesh in the 1973 Bangladeshi general election
- Anwar Hossain Howlader, MP in 1986 Bangladeshi general election
- AKM Jahangir Hossain, the member of parliament (MP) for constituency Patuakhali-3 from 1991 to 2006 and was MP for Patuakhali-3 again since 2014
- Golam Maula Rony, member of parliament for Patuakhali-3 from 2009 to 2014
- Nurul Haq Nur, joint-convener of Bangladesh Sadharan Chhatra Adhikar Sangrakshan Parishad and former vice-president, Dhaka University Central Students' Union
- Abul Hossain, former director general of Border Guard Bangladesh and ex-officio chairman of Shimanto Bank

== See also ==
- Upazilas of Bangladesh
- Districts of Bangladesh
- Divisions of Bangladesh
- Administrative geography of Bangladesh
