= Abdur Rahman Khokon =

Bangladeshi politician

Member of Bangladesh Parliament
- In office February 1996 – June 1996
- Preceded by: Dhirendra Debnath Shambhu
- Succeeded by: Dhirendra Debnath Shambhu

Personal details
- Political party: Bangladesh Nationalist Party

Abdur Rahman Khokon is a Bangladesh Nationalist Party politician and a former member of parliament for Barguna-1.

== Career ==
Ahmed was elected to parliament from Barguna-1 as a Bangladesh Nationalist Party candidate in February 1996.
