= Char Tufania =

Island in Bangladesh

Geography
- Location: Bay of Bengal
- Coordinates: 21.8453°N 90.3779°E

Administration
- Bangladesh
- Division: Barisal Division
- District: Patuakhali District
- Upazila: Rangabali Upazila

Demographics
- Languages: Bengali

Char Tufania (Bengali: চর তুফানিয়া) is an island in Bangladesh, situated in the Bay of Bengal. It is part of the Rangabali Upazila of Patuakhali District.

== Geography ==
Char Tufania is characterized by sandy beaches, water channels, and low-lying land. The island is accessible by ferry from the Rangabali Upazila mainland. A char is an island formed by the continuous shifting of a river.

== See also ==
- List of islands of Bangladesh
