= Char Amtali =

Amtali Paurosava
- Location in Bangladesh
- Coordinates: 22°31′N 90°15′E
- Country: Bangladesh
- Division: Barisal Division
- District: Barguna District
- Time zone: UTC+6 (Bangladesh Time)
- Postal code: 8710
- Website: www.amtali.com

Amtali Paurasava is a Paurasava in Amtali Upazila in Barguna District in the Barisal Division of southern-central Bangladesh. It's famous for Amtali M.U High School and Amtali Degree College.It Stands on the bank of Payra River. It is the main Upazila of Barguna District
