= Athara Gachhia =

Athara Gachhia Union আঠারগাছিয়া ইউনিয়ন
- Union Council
- No. 3 Athara Gachhia Union Council
- Location in Bangladesh
- Coordinates: 22°12′N 90°21′E
- Country: Bangladesh
- Division: Barisal Division
- District: Barguna District
- Upazila: Amtali Upazila

Government
  - Union Parishad Chairman: Mohammad Rafiqul Islam Ripon

Population
  - Total: 23,444
- Time zone: UTC+6 (BST)
- Website: athrogasiaup.barguna.gov.bd

Athara Gachhia Union (Bengali: আঠারগাছিয়া ইউনিয়ন) is a union parishad under Amtali Upazila of Barguna District in the Barisal Division of southern Bangladesh.

== Geography ==
The area of Athara Gachhia Union is 11,296 acres.

== Administration ==
Athara Gachhia Union is the 3rd Union Parishad under Amtali Upazila. The administrative activities of this union are under the jurisdiction of Amtali Thana. It is part of the 109th parliamentary constituency, Barguna-1. It contains 12 villages:

1. Atharagasia
2. Godanga
3. Darikata
4. Chalitabunia
5. Ghazipur
6. Gerabunia
7. Algi
8. Sakharia
9. Chaola
10. Dharma Narayan
11. Golbunia
12. Sonakhali

== Population ==
According to the 2011 Bangladeshi census, the total population of Athara Gachhia Union is 23,444. Among them, 11,350 are males and 12,094 are females. The total number of households is 5,349.

== Education ==
According to the 2011 census, the literacy rate of Chaora Union is 44.2%.
