= Chaora Union =

Chaora Union চাওড়া ইউনিয়ন
- Union Council
- No. 5 Chaora Union Council
- Location in Bangladesh
- Coordinates: 22°10′N 90°17′E
- Country: Bangladesh
- Division: Barisal Division
- District: Barguna District
- Upazila: Amtali Upazila

Government
  - Union Parishad Chairman: Mohammad Akhtaruzzaman Khan Badal

Population
  - Total: 20,802
- Time zone: UTC+6 (BST)
- Postal code: 3126
- Website: chowraup.barguna.gov.bd

Chaora Union (Bengali: চাওড়া ইউনিয়ন) is a union parishad under Amtali Upazila of Barguna District in the Barisal Division of southern Bangladesh.

== History ==
Chaora had a historical importance in the coastal defence network of the southern Bengal Subah during the Mughal period. In the 17th century, the greater Patuakhali and Barisal region suffered repeated raids by Magh and Portuguese pirates which started to depopulate vast areas of the lower delta, and it is known that there once existed a Portuguese fort at Khepupara, near Amtali Upazila. This prompted Mughal authorities to establish an earthen fort in the village of Patakata in present-day Chaora Union for protection and counterattack. It was strategically situated on the Chaora River, which once extended nearly 20 kilometres and served as an important inland waterway. Over time, the river’s course changed and its strong current diminished, leaving behind only a large earthen mound that marks the remnants of the earlier defensive fortification. It is generally thought to have been constructed under Subahdar Shaista Khan of Bengal, perhaps under the initiative of his son Buzurg Umed Khan. However, other historians alternatively attributed its establishment to the defensive initiatives undertaken by Prince Shah Shuja or Faujdar Agha Baqer Khan.

== Geography ==
The area of Chaora Union is 10,239 acres.

== Administration ==
Chaora Union is the 5th Union Parishad under Amtali Upazila. The administrative activities of this union are under the jurisdiction of Amtali Thana. It is part of the 109th parliamentary constituency, Barguna-1. It contains 14 villages:

- Batiyaghata
- Chandra
- Chandra Chalitabunia
- Chaora
- Kaunia
- Chalabhanga
- Lodha
- Chaora Chalitabunia
- Chaora Kali Bari
- Ghotkhali
- Baitaghata
- Gilatala
- Betmor
- Patakata

== Population ==
According to the 2011 Bangladeshi census, the total population of Chaora Union is 20,802. Among them, 10,154 are males and 10,648 are females. The total number of households is 4,741.

== Education ==
According to the 2011 census, the literacy rate of Chaora Union is 46.6%.
