= Patuakhali-5 =

- Former constituency for the Jatiya Sangsad
- District: Patuakhali District
- Division: Barisal Division

Former constituency
- Created: 1973
- Abolished: 1984
- Last MP: Habibur Rahman Mia

Patuakhali-5 was a constituency represented in the Jatiya Sangsad (National Parliament) of Bangladesh. It was located in Patuakhali District.

== History ==
The Patuakhali-5 constituency was created for the first general elections in independent Bangladesh, held in 1973. The constituency was abolished in 1984.

== Members of Parliament ==
Election	Member	Party
1973	Nizam Uddin Ahmed	Bangladesh Awami League
1979	Habibur Rahman Mia	Bangladesh Awami League
Constituency abolished
