= Char Hare =

Island in Bangladesh

Coordinates: 21°50′N 90°26′E

- Interactive map of Char Hare

Geography
- Location: Bay of Bengal

Administration
- Bangladesh
- Division: Barisal Division
- District: Patuakhali District
- Upazila: Rangabali Upazila

Demographics
- Languages: Bengali

Char Hare (Bengali: চর হেয়ার), also known as Char Kalagachia, is an island in Bangladesh, in the waters of the Bay of Bengal. It lies off the coast of the Rangabali Upazila of Patuakhali District in the Barisal Division. The island features a four‑kilometre long sandy beach fronting the sea.

== Geography ==
Char Hare is positioned such that to its east is a protected forest area and adjacent is Char Kashem. A char is an island formed by the continuous shifting of a river.

== Tourism ==
Char Hare is gaining popularity among adventure and eco‑tourism visitors due to its relatively untouched environment.

== See also ==
- List of islands of Bangladesh
