= Andar Char =

Andar Char আন্ডার চর
- Location in Bangladesh
- Coordinates: 22°52′N 90°31′E
- Country: Bangladesh
- Division: Barisal Division
- District: Patuakhali District
- Upazila: Galachipa
- Union council: Char Montaz

Population (2011)
  - Total: 1,609
- Time zone: UTC+6 (Bangladesh Time)

Andar Char (Bengali: আন্ডার চর) is a village in Patuakhali District in the Barisal Division of southern-central Bangladesh. It is on a coastal island in the western Bay of Bengal which has the same name. The village forms a mauza along with the village of Kabiraj Para.

== Etymology ==
A char is an island formed by the continuous shifting of a river.

== History ==
On 7 May 2003, Andar Char was the site of a pirate attack against 27 fishing trawlers. The boats were in the bay when they were boarded by armed pirates, and the fishermen involved lost their catch, their nets, and other valuables. 11 fishermen who attempted to resist were thrown overboard; 7 of them drowned and the other 4 were rescued by other fishermen.

== Population ==
As of 2011, the village's population is 1,609 people, in 348 households.

== Demographics ==
According to the 2011 Bangladesh census, Andar Char has a population of 1,609 people, in 348 households, with an average household size of 4.6 people. The population includes 830 males and 779 females, with a corresponding sex ratio of 107. The village's literacy rate is 63.9%, including 63.8% among males and 64.1% among females. 1,589 of the village's residents are Muslim and 20 are Hindu. A total of 42.0% of the village's residents are age 0 through 19. The village has a total workforce of 99 people, including 93 men and 6 women; all the women and all but two of the men are employed in agriculture. The remaining two men are employed in the service sector. In addition, 76 women were counted as primarily engaged in household work.

Of the village's 348 households, a majority (67.2%) are kutcha structures, with another 28.7% being jhupri and the remaining 4.0% being semi-pucca (none were fully pucca). 21.8% of households had sanitary toilets with water seal, 47.4% had sanitary toilets with no water seal, 26.1% had non-sanitary toilets, and the remaining 4.6% had no toilets. All households obtained drinking water via tube well, and likewise all households were owned instead of rented.
