= Mahmudul Hossain Waliullah =

Bangladeshi politician (born 1983)

Mufti Mahmudul Hossain Waliullah Pir Saheb Barguna
- মোহম্মদ মাহমূদুল হোসেন অলিউল্লাহ্

Member of Parliament
- Incumbent
- Assumed office 17 February 2026
- Preceded by: Golam Sarwar Tuku
- Constituency: Barguna-1

Personal details
- Born: 1 February 1983 (age 43) Keorabunia, Barguna District, Bangladesh
- Party: Islami Andolan Bangladesh

Religious life
- Religion: Islam
- Denomination: Sunni
- Jurisprudence: Hanafi
- Movement: Deobandi

Muslim leader
- Predecessor: Mohammed Abdur Rashid
- Disciple of: Mohammed Abdur Rashid

Mohammad Mahmudul Hossain Waliullah (Bengali: মোহম্মদ মাহমূদুল হোসেন অলিউল্লাহ্), or simply Md Oli Ullah, is a Bangladeshi Islamic scholar, businessman and politician. He is the spiritual guide of the Keorabunia Darbar Sharif and known reverentially as the Pir Saheb of Barguna. Waliullah is also a member of the 13th Jatiya Sangsad after being elected from the Barguna-1 constituency at the 2026 Bangladeshi general election.

== Early life ==
Waliullah was born on 1 February 1983 to a Sunni Muslim Bengali family in the Huzur Bari of Keorabunia in Barguna District, Bangladesh. He is the second son and principal spiritual successor of Pir Saheb Barguna Mawlana Mohammed Abdur Rashid (1928–2018), founder of the Keorabunia Darbar Sharif complex encompassing a madrasa, orphanage and lodge. His father was an authorised disciple of Syed Muhammad Ishaq of Charmonai and a former vice-president of Islami Andolan Bangladesh. Waliullah completed his education at Jamia Eshaqia Rashidia, an Islamic institution founded by his father in Keorabunia.

== Political career ==
Waliullah joined the Barguna District committee of Islami Andolan Bangladesh, serving in various roles from convener, member secretary etc. to eventually becoming the branch's president and general secretary. He is also a central member of the National Ulama Mashayekh Aimma Council. Waliullah serves as the chief adviser of the Barguna District branch of Islami Andolan Bangladesh and is a member of the political party's central majlis-e-Shura.

Waliullah contested in the 2018 Bangladeshi general election but was unsuccessful. He was successfully elected for the first time in the 2026 Bangladeshi general election as an Islami Andolan candidate from Barguna-1. He gained 140,291 votes.
