= Char Kashem =

Island in Bangladesh

Geography
- Location: Bay of Bengal
- Coordinates: 21°53′40.48″N 90°26′18.18″E

Administration
- Bangladesh
- Division: Barisal Division
- District: Patuakhali District
- Upazila: Rangabali Upazila

Demographics
- Languages: Bengali

Char Kashem (Bengali: চর কাশেম) is a remote island located in the Rangabali Upazila of Patuakhali District of Bangladesh. It is surrounded by waterways and the Bay of Bengal, and forms one of the most isolated inhabited chars in the country.

== Geography ==
A char is an island formed by the continuous shifting of a river. Char Kashem lies in a low-lying area vulnerable to river erosion and tidal flooding. Due to its location, the island is subject to frequent waterlogging, making basic facilities difficult to access.

Char Hare is adjacent to the island.

== Population ==
The island is inhabited by around 600 people. Despite the population, there is currently no primary school or other educational institution on the char.

== See also ==
- List of islands of Bangladesh
