= Amtali, Agartala =

Amtali
- town
- Location within Tripura Location within India
- Coordinates: 23°46′N 91°16′E
- Country: India
- State: Tripura
- District: West Tripura
- Elevation: 22 m (72 ft)

Languages
  - Official: Bengali, Kokborok, English
- Time zone: UTC+5:30 (IST)
- Vehicle registration: TR
- Website: tripura.gov.in

Amtali is a town in Tripura. It is 10 km away from Agartala in West Tripura district of Tripura state. There is one post-office in the Amtali Bazar (market place) and one Police station also. It is approximately 2 km away from the Tripura University. This town is located in Dukli Rural Development Block.
