= Humayun Kabir Hiru =

Bangladeshi politician

Member of Bangladesh Parliament
- In office 1986–1988
- Succeeded by: Zafrul Hasan Farhad

Personal details
- Party: Jatiya Samajtantrik Dal-JSD

Humayun Kabir Hiru is a Jatiya Samajtantrik Dal-JSD politician and a former member of parliament for Barguna-1.

== Career ==
Hiru was elected to parliament from Barguna-1 as a Jatiya Samajtantrik Dal-JSD candidate in 1986.
