= Patuakhali-3 =

Constituency of Bangladesh's Jatiya Sangsad

Coordinates: 22.17°N 90.41°E

- Constituency for the Jatiya Sangsad
- District: Patuakhali District
- Division: Barisal Division
- Electorate: 298,675 (2018)

Current constituency
- Created: 1973
- Party: Gono Odhikar Parishad
- Member: Nurul Haque Nur
- ← 112 Patuakhali-2 114 Patuakhali-4 →

Patuakhali-3 is a constituency represented in the Jatiya Sangsad (National Parliament) of Bangladesh. The current member of parliament is Nurul Haque Nur.

== Boundaries ==
The constituency encompasses Dashmina and Galachipa upazilas.

== History ==
The constituency was created for the first general elections in newly independent Bangladesh, held in 1973.

Ahead of the 2014 general election, the Election Commission reduced the boundaries of the constituency. Previously it had included one union parishad of Patuakhali Sadar Upazila: Auliapur.

== Members of Parliament ==
| Election | Member | Party |
|---|---|---|
| 1973 | Habibur Rahman Mia | Awami League |
| 1979 | Moazzem Hossain | BNP |
Major Boundary Changes
| 1986 | Anwar Hossain Howlader | Jatiya Party |
| 1988 | Mohammad Yakub Ali Chowdhury | Jatiya Party |
| 1991 | AKM Jahangir Hossain | Awami League |
| Feb 1996 | Shajahan Khan | BNP |
| Jun 1996 | AKM Jahangir Hossain | Awami League |
| 2008 | Golam Maula Rony | Awami League |
| 2014 | AKM Jahangir Hossain | Awami League |
| 2018 | SM Shahjada | Awami League |
| 2026 | Nurul Haque Nur | Gono Odhikar Parishad |

== Elections ==
=== Elections in the 2010s ===
General Election 2014: Patuakhali-3
| Party | Candidate | Votes | % | ±% |
|---|---|---|---|---|
| AL | AKM Jahangir Hossain | 153,840 | 97.7 | +36.7 |
| BNF | AYM Kamrul Islam | 3,105 | 2.0 | N/A |
| Jatiya Samajtantrik Dal-JSD | Md. Habibur Rahman | 489 | 0.3 | N/A |
| Majority | | 150,735 | 95.7 | +65.9 |
| Turnout | | 157,434 | 62.5 | −22.8 |
| AL hold | | | | |

=== Elections in the 2000s ===
General Election 2008: Patuakhali-3
| Party | Candidate | Votes | % | ±% |
|---|---|---|---|---|
| AL | Golam Maula Rony | 120,010 | 61.0 | +10.7 |
| BNP | Shahjahan Khan | 61,423 | 31.2 | −10.5 |
| IAB | Abu Bakar Siddik | 14,970 | 7.6 | N/A |
| Gano Forum | Shah Alom Bhuyan | 469 | 0.2 | N/A |
| Majority | | 58,587 | 29.8 | +21.2 |
| Turnout | | 196,872 | 85.3 | +23.9 |
| AL hold | | | | |

General Election 2001: Patuakhali-3
| Party | Candidate | Votes | % | ±% |
|---|---|---|---|---|
| AL | AKM Jahangir Hossain | 75,138 | 50.3 | −2.4 |
| BNP | Shahjahan Khan | 62,310 | 41.7 | +9.1 |
| Independent | A. Barek Dhali | 6,176 | 4.1 | N/A |
| IJOF | Anowar Hossain | 4,366 | 2.9 | N/A |
| Independent | Syed Md. Haroon Ur Rashid | 1,013 | 0.7 | N/A |
| Independent | Md. Abul Barkat | 295 | 0.2 | N/A |
| CPB | Md. Samsul Haq Gazi | 130 | 0.1 | −0.1 |
| Jatiya Party (M) | Md. Moklesur Rahman Khan | 29 | 0.0 | N/A |
| Majority | | 12,828 | 8.6 | −11.5 |
| Turnout | | 149,457 | 61.4 | −0.2 |
| AL hold | | | | |

=== Elections in the 1990s ===
General Election June 1996: Patuakhali-3
| Party | Candidate | Votes | % | ±% |
|---|---|---|---|---|
| AL | AKM Jahangir Hossain | 50,639 | 52.7 | −1.8 |
| BNP | Shahjahan Khan | 31,281 | 32.6 | +12.3 |
| IOJ | Md. Mohibullah | 5,754 | 6.0 | N/A |
| JP(E) | Mohammad Yakub Ali Chowdhury | 3,977 | 4.1 | −9.0 |
| Jamaat | Ashraf Ali Khan | 3,257 | 3.4 | −7.1 |
| Zaker Party | Md. Ajizul Haque | 380 | 0.4 | +0.1 |
| Jatiya Samajtantrik Dal-JSD | Md. Nizam Uddin Tang | 243 | 0.3 | 0.0 |
| CPB | Samsul Haque Gazi | 212 | 0.2 | N/A |
| Gano Forum | Rafikul Islam | 190 | 0.2 | N/A |
| FP | Afzal Hossain | 180 | 0.2 | +0.1 |
| Majority | | 19,358 | 20.1 | −14.1 |
| Turnout | | 96,113 | 61.6 | +22.8 |
| AL hold | | | | |

General Election 1991: Patuakhali-3
| Party | Candidate | Votes | % | ±% |
|---|---|---|---|---|
| AL | AKM Jahangir Hossain | 51,754 | 54.5 | |
| BNP | A. Baten | 19,243 | 20.3 | |
| JP(E) | Shahjahan Islam | 12,416 | 13.1 | |
| Jamaat | Ashraf Ali Khan | 9,950 | 10.5 | |
| IOJ | Shahjahan Pada | 947 | 1.0 | |
| Jatiya Samajtantrik Dal-JSD | A. B. Siddikur Rahman | 306 | 0.3 | |
| Zaker Party | A. Malek | 271 | 0.3 | |
| FP | Rafikul Islam | 96 | 0.1 | |
| Majority | | 32,511 | 34.2 | |
| Turnout | | 94,983 | 38.8 | |
| AL gain from JP(E) | | | | |
