= Shajahan Khan (Patuakhali politician) =

Bangladeshi politician (1951/1952 – 2022)

- শাহজাহান খান

Member of Parliament for Patuakhali-3
- In office 19 March 1996 – 30 March 1996
- Preceded by: AKM Jahangir Hossain
- Succeeded by: AKM Jahangir Hossain

Personal details
- Born: 1951/1952
- Died: 28 November 2022 (aged 70) Dhaka, Bangladesh
- Party: Bangladesh Nationalist Party

Shajahan Khan (1951/1952 – 28 November 2022) was a Bangladesh Nationalist Party politician who was a Jatiya Sangsad member from the Patuakhali-3 constituency in March 1996.
