= Galachipa =

- Town
- Location of Galachipa in Barisal Division
- Coordinates: 22.163373°N 90.410162°E
- Country: Bangladesh
- Division: Barisal Division
- District: Patuakhali District
- Upazila: Galachipa Upazila
- Municipal town: 1998
- Upazila town: 1984

Government
  - Type: Municipality
  - Body: Galachipa Municipality
  - Mayor: Ahsanul Haque Tuhin

Area
  - Total: 11.92 km^{2} (4.60 sq mi)

Population
  - Total: 25,917
  - Density: 2,174/km^{2} (5,631/sq mi)
- Time zone: UTC+6 (BST)

Galachipa Municipality mahallah geocode map

Galachipa is a town in Patuakhali District under Barisal Division, Bangladesh. It is the headquarters of Galachipa Upazila. It is the third largest town of Patuakhali District and the largest and main urban center of Galachipa Upazila. The nearest international and domestic airports to the town are Hazrat Shahjalal International Airport and Patuakhali Airport respectively. The town is located 72.7 km from the divisional city Barisal and 31.7 km from the district headquarters Patuakhali.

== Demographics ==
The total population of Galachipa town is 25,917, of which 13,246 are male and 12,671 are female. The male-to-female ratio is 105:100. The town has a total of 6,128 households.

== Geography ==
The geographical coordinates of Galachipa town are 22.163373°N 90.410162°E. Its average elevation above sea level is 8.91 meters.

== Administration ==
In 1998, to provide civic services and other facilities to the residents of Galachipa, a local government body named Galachipa Municipality was formed. It is divided into 9 wards and 9 mahallas. Out of the total 11.92 square kilometers of Galachipa town, 3.39 sq km are under the jurisdiction of Galachipa Municipality.

== Education ==
The literacy rate of Galachipa town is 70 percent.
