= Moazzem Hossain (politician) =

Bangladeshi politician

Member of Bangladesh Parliament
- In office 1979–1986
- Preceded by: Habibur Rahman Mia
- Succeeded by: Anwar Hossain Howlader

Personal details
- Political party: Bangladesh Nationalist Party

Moazzem Hossain is a politician of the Bangladesh Nationalist Party and a former member of parliament for Patuakhali-3.

== Career ==
Hossain was elected to parliament from Patuakhali-3 as a candidate of the Bangladesh Nationalist Party in 1979.
