= Panpatti Union =

Coordinates: 22.1167°N 90.4414°E

Panpatti Union is a union parishad of Galachipa Upazila of Patuakhali District in Bangladesh. During the war of liberation in 1971, three members of the Pakistan Army were killed at Panpatti in an encounter with the rebels. There is a monument at Panpatti memorializing the war.
