= Delwar Hossain (Barguna politician) =

Bangladeshi politician (died 2023)

- দেলোয়ার হোসেন

Member of Parliament for Barguna-1
- In office 28 October 2001 – 27 October 2006
- Preceded by: Direndro Debnath Shambhu
- Succeeded by: Direndro Debnath Shambhu

Personal details
- Born: c. 1955
- Died: 12 January 2023 (aged 67) Barisal, Bangladesh
- Party: Independent

Delwar Hossain (c. 1955 – 12 January 2023) was a Bangladeshi independent politician who was a Jatiya Sangsad member, representing the Barguna-1 constituency.

== Life and career ==
Hossain was elected to parliament from Barguna-1 as an independent candidate in 2001.

Hossain died of kidney disease on 12 January 2023, at the age of 67.
