= Char Bijoy =

Island in Bangladesh

Native name: চর বিজয়
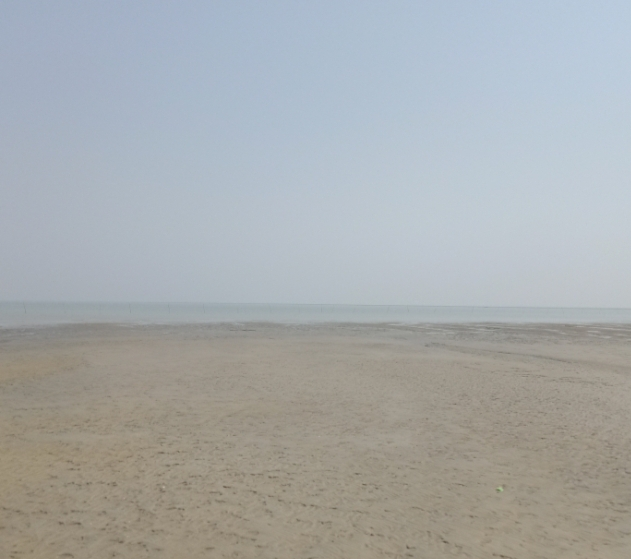
- A view of Char Bijoy

Geography
- Location: Bay of Bengal

Administration
- Bangladesh
- Division: Barisal Division
- District: Patuakhali District

Demographics
- Languages: Bengali

Char Bijoy (Bengali: চর বিজয়; Bengali pronunciation: [tʃɔr bidʒɔe̯]) is an island in Bangladesh, located in the Bay of Bengal, approximately 30 km off the coast of Kuakata in Patuakhali District. The island emerged naturally and is gradually increasing in size.

== Etymology ==
The island was identified by authorities in December 2017. In Bangladesh, December is celebrated as the month of victory, and the island was subsequently named "Char Bijoy" in reference to this.

== Geography ==
A char is an island formed by the continuous shifting of a river. Char Bijoy features sandy beaches and low-lying land that emerges during low tide. The island is slowly becoming a permanent landmass over time.

== Flora and fauna ==
Char Bijoy hosts red crabs. Efforts for afforestation and environmental management have been mentioned by local authorities.

== Tourism ==
Char Bijoy is gaining attention as a potential future hotspot for eco-tourism in Bangladesh.

== See also ==
- List of islands of Bangladesh
