= SM Shahjada =

Bangladeshi politician

- এস এম শাহাজাদা

Member of the Bangladesh Parliament for Patuakhali-3
- In office 30 January 2019 – 6 August 2024
- Preceded by: AKM Jahangir Hossain
- Succeeded by: Nurul Haque Nur

Personal details
- Born: 15 January 1974 (age 52)
- Party: Bangladesh Awami League

SM Shahjada (born 15 January 1974) is a Bangladesh Awami League politician and a former Jatiya Sangsad member representing the Patuakhali-3 constituency.

== Career ==
Shahjada was elected to parliament from Patuakhali-3 as a Bangladesh Awami League candidate on 30 December 2018. His candidacy was controversial as his maternal uncle, KM Nurul Huda, was the head of the Bangladesh Election Commission overseeing the general elections.
