= Sonadia Island =

Island in Bangladesh

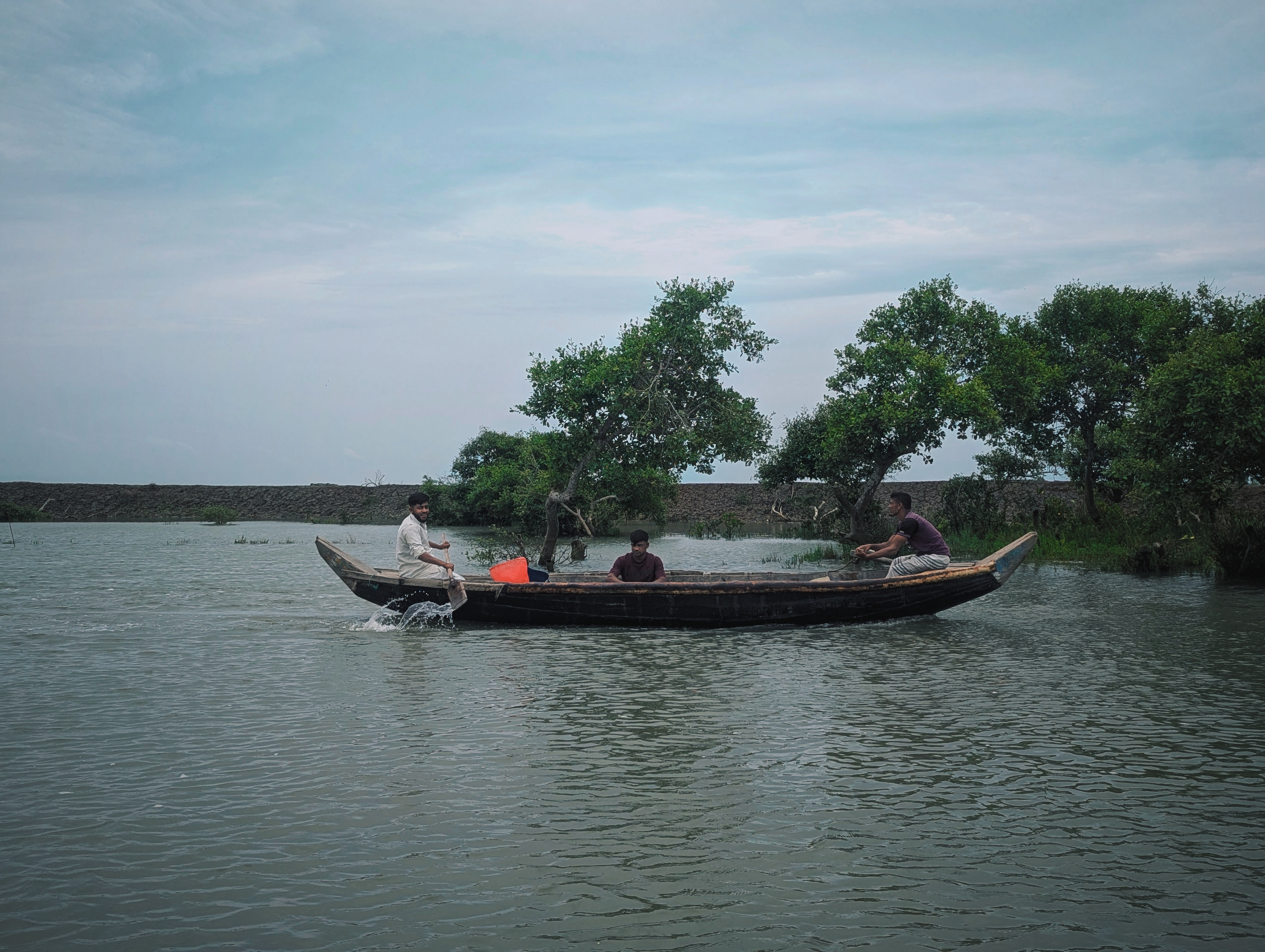
- Coastal mangroves

- Location within Bangladesh

Geography
- Location: Bay of Bengal
- Coordinates: 21.496°N 91.884°E
- Area: 9 km^{2} (3.5 sq mi)

Administration
- Bangladesh

Sonadia Island is a small island of about 9 km^{2} (3.5 sq mi), off the Cox's Bazar coast of Chittagong Division, Bangladesh. Sonadia is located at Kutubjom Union in Maheshkhali Upazila, 15 km north-west of Cox's Bazar District Headquarters. Sonadia Maheshkhali is separated from the main island by a canal.

== Biodiversity ==
=== Turtles ===
Five species of sea turtle have been reported from the territorial waters of Bangladesh, but only olive ridley and green turtles nest on Sonadia Island. The illegal harvesting of turtle eggs, bycatch in offshore fisheries, and alterations of sand dunes and nesting beaches are the main threats to sea turtles in Bangladesh. Since 1980, the nesting populations of sea turtles have declined significantly due to severe exploitation of eggs and killing of adult turtles by fishing and other activities. Despite complete legal protection since 2010, sea turtles continue to face severe threats in Bangladesh, and many of the nesting rookeries remain poorly studied.

=== Birds ===
The island has been designated an Important Bird Area (IBA) by BirdLife International because it supports significant populations of wintering migratory waders, including great knots, spoon-billed sandpipers and spotted greenshanks.

== Threats ==
Sonadia is seen as a potential deepwater port lying on the Bay of Bengal that could serve the landlocked parts of India, Myanmar and China. Rail connections have yet to be built, and the question of gauge has yet to be resolved.

== See also ==
- Transport in Bangladesh
- List of islands of Bangladesh
