= Golam Sarwar Tuku =

Bangladeshi politician

Golam Sorowar Tuku
- গোলাম সরোয়ার টুকু

Member of the Bangladesh Parliament for Barguna-1
- In office 10 January 2024 – 6 August 2024
- Preceded by: Dhirendra Debnath Shambhu
- Succeeded by: Mahmudul Hossain Waliullah

Personal details
- Born: 7 July 1970 (age 55)
- Party: Awami League
- Occupation: Politician

Golam Sarwar Tuku (born 7 July 1970) is a Bangladeshi politician. He is a former Jatiya Sangsad member representing the Barguna-1 constituency.

== Career ==
Tuku was elected to parliament in January 2024 from Barguna-1 as an Independent candidate. He received 61, 742 beating Awami League candidate Dhirendra Debnath Shambhu.
