= Zafrul Hasan Farhad =

Bangladeshi politician

Member of Parliament for Barguna-1
- In office 1988–1990
- Preceded by: Humyun Kabir Hiru
- Succeeded by: Dhirendra Debnath Shambhu

Personal details
- Born: c. 1953
- Died: 17 January 2017 (aged 64)
- Party: Jatiya Party

Zafrul Hasan Farhad (Bengali: জ়াফরুল হাসান ফরহাদ, Bengali pronunciation: [zadfrul ɦasan fɔrɦad]; c. 1953 – 18 January 2017) was a Bangladeshi politician from Barguna belonging to Jatiya Party. He was a member of the Jatiya Sangsad.

== Biography ==
Farhad was the president of Barguna District unit of Jatiya Party. He was elected as a member of the Jatiya Sangsad from Barguna-1 in 1988.

Farhad died of cardiac arrest on 18 January 2017 at Sher-e-Bangla Medical College Hospital in Barisal at the age of 64.

Farhad's daughter, Azmeri Monalisa, died of dengue in Barguna on 7 June 2025. Her family alleged medical negligence at the Barguna Sadar Hospital.
