= Golam Maula Rony =

Bangladeshi politician

- গোলাম মাওলা রনি

Member of Parliament
- In office 25 January 2009 – 24 January 2018
- Preceded by: AKM Jahangir Hossain
- Succeeded by: AKM Jahangir Hossain
- Constituency: Patuakhali-3

Personal details
- Born: 1967 (age 58–59) Sadarpur Thana, Faridpur District, Pakistan (now Bangladesh)
- Party: Bangladesh Nationalist Party
- Other political affiliations: Bangladesh Awami League
- Education: University of Dhaka
- Occupation: Politician, businessman

Golam Maula Rony (born c. 1967) is a Bangladeshi politician and businessman. He is a former Jatiya Sangsad member for the Patuakhali-3 constituency representing Bangladesh Awami League. He joined Bangladesh Nationalist Party in November 2018.

== Early life ==
Golam Maula was born in 1967 to Monowara Begum and Samsuddin Munshi (d. 2010) in Sadarpur Thana of Faridpur District. He was the eldest of Samsuddin Munshi's seven sons. In 1974, Samsuddin Munshi, to expand his business, moved his family to Ulania in Patuakhali District.

Rony attended Baisharshi Shiv Sundar Academy in Faridpur, and later Ulania Hat Secondary School in Galachipa Upazila, where he completed his Secondary School Certificate (SSC) in 1986 and stood 2nd in barishal division. He got married after completing SSC. After completing HSC (Higher Secondary Certificate) from Dhaka College Rony took admission in University of Dhaka and completed graduation at LLB. He completed his further education in the same field in Chicago, Illinois, United States.

== Career ==
Golam Maula Rony started his career with journalism. Later he started his own shipping and textile business. He is the chief executive officer (CEO) of Saybolt Group and also the owner of dnewsbd.com.

In the 9th national parliamentary election Rony was elected to be the MP of Patuakhali-3. Chief Whip Abdus Shahid investigated Rony for letting his chauffeur use his government allocated furnished apartment violating parliamentary rules. In July 2013, he was detained from Bashundhara Residential Area by Detective Branch over allegations of beating up Independent TV journalists in his office. He had also filed a case against the journalists accusing them of trying to extort him. In the tenth national parliamentary election of Bangladesh Rony did not do election (Awami League) for Patuakhali-3, because of embarrassing the government by making anti Awami League statement in a TV show.

Rony ran for mayor of Dhaka South City Corporation in April 2015, but couldn’t win the election. On 26 November 2018, he joined the Bangladesh Nationalist Party. He was nominated by the Party for Patuakhali-3 in 2018.

In July 2022, the government of Bangladesh demolished Rony residence Ulania Bazar, Galachipa Upazila, Patuakhali District along with 15 other buildings allegedly build on government land. He filed a petition with the Bangladesh High Court but it was denied by Justices Zafar Ahmed and Md. Akhtaruzzaman.

== Personal life ==
Golam Maula Rony is married to Kamrun Nahar Runu, his childhood sweetheart. The couple have two sons and one daughter.

== Books ==
Rony is the author of four books:

- এমপির কারাদহন (in Bengali). Anbesa. 2014. ISBN 978-9848991701.
- Draṃ, Sañjība (2013). গোলাম মাওলা রনির নির্বাচিত কলাম [Golam Maula Rony selected columns] (in Bengali). Sūcīpatra. ISBN 978-9848557891.
- Rani, Golāma Māolā (2014). তাসের ঘরে বাঁশের খুটি [Bamboo pillars in the house of cards] (in Bengali). ISBN 978-9847601748.
- Rani, Golāma Māolā (2014). মোঘল হেরেমের দুনিয়া কাঁপানো প্রেম [Mughal harem Earth-shaking love] (in Bengali). Ānbeshā Prakāśana. ISBN 978-9848991695.
