= Mohammad Yakub Ali Chowdhury (politician) =

Bangladeshi politician

Member of Bangladesh Parliament
- In office 1988–1991
- Preceded by: Anwar Hossain Howlader
- Succeeded by: AKM Jahangir Hossain

Personal details
- Died: 25 July 2015
- Party: Jatiya Party (Ershad)

Mohammad Yakub Ali Chowdhury (died 25 July 2015) was a Jatiya Party (Ershad) politician and a former member of parliament for Patuakhali-3.

== Career ==
Chowdhury was elected to parliament from Patuakhali-3 as a Jatiya Party candidate in 1988.
