= Mujibur Rahman Talukder =

Bangladeshi politician

Barguna-3 constituency Member of Parliament
- In office 27 February 1991 – 15 February 1996
- Preceded by: Matiar Rahman Talukder
- Succeeded by: Abdul Majid Mallick
- In office 1996 – 1 October 2001
- Preceded by: Abdul Majid Mallick
- Succeeded by: Sheikh Hasina

Personal details
- Born: Barguna
- Died: 30 August 2001
- Party: Awami League
- Education: Calcutta Islamia College

Mujibur Rahman Talukder (Died: 30 August 2001) Politician and organizer of the Bangladesh Liberation war in Barguna District who was a Member of Parliament for the then Barguna-3 constituency.

== Early life ==
Talukder was born in Barguna district. He studied at Islamia College, Calcutta.

== Career ==
Talukdar was the organizer of the war of liberation and president of the Barguna District Awami League. He was elected a member of the provincial council as an Awami League candidate in the 1970 elections. He was elected as a Member of Parliament from the then Barguna-3 constituency as a candidate of Bangladesh Awami League in the fifth parliamentary elections of 1991 and the seventh parliamentary elections of 12 June 1996.

== Death ==
Talukder died on 30 August 2001.
