= Bangabandhu Island =

Island in Bangladesh

Geography
- Location: Bay of Bengal
- Coordinates: 21.7051°N 89.3382°E
- Type: Ephemeral
- Area: 10 km^{2} (3.9 sq mi)
- Length: 9 km (5.6 mi)
- Width: 0.5 km (0.31 mi)

Administration
- Bangladesh

Demographics
- Population: None

Additional information
- Time zone: UTC+6

Khulna Island, also known as Putney Island, is an island in the Bay of Bengal, 10 km south of Dublar Char, in Khulna, Bangladesh. It is a new tourist attraction in the Khulna District.

== Location ==
Putney Island lies in the Satkhira range of Sundarbans. The island is located on the Bay of Bengal, 15 km from Hiran Point in Sundarbans and 20 km from Dublar Char.

== History ==
The existence of the island has been detected in satellite images since 1976. After that the island occasionally resurfaced and sunk again. In 1992, while fishing in the sea, a fisherman named Malek Farazi, who was a fan of the first president of Bangladesh, Sheikh Mujibur Rahman (widely known as "Bangabandhu"), first discovered the newly awakened island with other two fishermen. At that time, Farazi named the uninhabited island after Rahman and put up a signboard there with the island's name.

After 2004, the size of the island gradually stabilized. Since then, the island has been growing steadily without sinking. In 2017, some researcher from the University of Dhaka went to the newly awakened island. They stayed there for three consecutive days and carried out various types of scientific investigations including internal soil, DCP survey and visibility analysis of the island.

== Geographical extent and topography ==
At first, the Island was only 2 acres, but today it stands at around 10 square kilometers. Above sea level, its height is about 2 meters. The island has a sandy beach which is 9 kilometer long and 500 meter wide. There are small sand dunes or sandbars behind the island. Within less than ten years, a verdant expanse of forest and mangrove forest developed in the island.

== Flora and fauna ==
In terms of biodiversity, the flora and fauna of the island is quite diverse. The island is rich in biodiversity, with the beautiful running of countless red crabs, clear water, and wide sandy beaches. Initially, four species of crabs, 16 species of molluscs (snails, oysters, etc.), eight species of plankton and two species of barnacles were found on the island. Besides, a species of ascidian has been found on the island, which is the first in Bangladesh. Various species of insects including grasshoppers, butterflies, and bees are found among terrestrial animals.
