= Dukli =

Coordinates: 22°18′N 79°29′E

- Village
- Interactive map of Dukli
- Country: India
- State: Tripura
- District: West Tripura
- Sub-district: Dukli

Population (2011)
  - Total: 18,839
- Time zone: UTC+05:30 (IST)
- ISO 3166 code: IN-TR
- Website: tripura.gov.in

Dukli is a large village located in the West Tripura District, Tripura, India. The population is 17,306. 8,850 people are male. 7,989 people are female.
