= Barguna-1 =

Constituency of Bangladesh's Jatiya Sangsad

Coordinates: 22.14°N 90.23°E

- Constituency for the Jatiya Sangsad
- District: Barguna District
- Division: Barisal Division
- Electorate: 519,460 (2026)

Current constituency
- Created: 1984
- Party: Islami Andolan Bangladesh
- Member: Mahmudul Hossain Waliullah
- ← 108 Satkhira-4 110 Barguna-2 →

Barguna-1 is a constituency represented in the Jatiya Sangsad (National Parliament) of Bangladesh since 2026 by Mahmudul Hossain Waliullah of the Islami Andolan Bangladesh.

== Boundaries ==
The constituency encompasses Amtali, Barguna Sadar, and Taltali upazilas.

== History ==
The constituency was created in 1984 from a Patuakhali constituency when the former Patuakhali District was split into two districts: Barguna and Patuakhali.

Ahead of the 2008 general election, the Election Commission redrew constituency boundaries to reflect population changes revealed by the 2001 Bangladesh census. The 2008 redistricting altered the boundaries of the constituency.

== Members of Parliament ==
Election	Member	Party
1986	Humayun Kabir Hiru	Jatiya Samajtantrik Dal (Rab)
1988	Zafrul Hasan Farhad	Jatiya Party
1991	Dhirendra Debnath Shambhu	Awami League
Feb 1996	Abdur Rahman Khokon	Bangladesh Nationalist Party
Jun 1996	Direndra Debnath Shambhu	Awami League
2001	Delwar Hossain	Independent
2008	Direndra Debnath Shambhu	Awami League
2014	Direndra Debnath Shambhu	Awami League
2018	Direndra Debnath Shambhu	Awami League
2024	Golam Sarwar Tuku	Independent
2026	Mahmudul Hossain Waliullah	Islami Andolan Bangladesh

== Elections ==
=== Elections in the 2020s ===
General Election 2026: Barguna-1
Party	Candidate	Votes	%	±%
IAB	Mahmudul Hossain Waliullah	140,291	49.46	+41.26
BNP	Md. Nazrul Islam Molla	136,145	48.00	+38.60
Khelafat Majlis	Md. Jahangir Hossain	6,232	2.20	New
Jatiya Party (M)	Md. Jamal Hossain	981	0.35	New
Majority		4,146	1.46	−17.94
Turnout		283,649	54.61	−27.69
Registered electors		519,460		
IAB gain from Independent				

=== Elections in the 2010s ===
General Election 2014: Barguna-1
Party	Candidate	Votes	%	±%
AL	Dhirendra Debnath Shambhu	85,080	56.4	+6.2
Independent	Delwar Hossain	65,179	43.2	+12.4
BNF	Md. Kholilur Rahman Khan	512	0.3	N/A
Majority		19,901	13.2	−6.2
Turnout		150,771	41.9	−40.4
AL hold				

=== Elections in the 2000s ===
General Election 2008: Barguna-1
Party	Candidate	Votes	%	±%
AL	Direndro Debnath Shambhu	131,368	50.2	+15.9
Independent	Delwar Hossain	80,590	30.8	−25.9
BNP	Motiawer Rahaman Talukder	24,686	9.4	+8.5
IAB	Md. Mosharef Hossain	21,384	8.2	N/A
Zaker Party	Md. Kamruzzaman Khalek	2,354	0.9	N/A
BTF	Shah Md. Abul Kalam	510	0.2	N/A
BSD	Ferdaus Ahammad	363	0.1	N/A
Independent	Rashidul Hasan Khan	224	0.1	N/A
Majority		50,778	19.4	−2.9
Turnout		261,479	82.3	+19.7
AL gain from Independent				

General Election 2001: Barguna-1
Party	Candidate	Votes	%	±%
Independent	Delwar Hossain	84,611	56.7	N/A
AL	Dhirendra Debnath Shambhu	51,302	34.3	−13.4
IJOF	A. Rashid	11,889	8.0	N/A
BNP	Md. Jahangir Hossain	1,376	0.9	−15.3
JSD	Ziaul Kabir Dulu	178	0.1	N/A
Majority		33,309	22.3	−0.7
Turnout		149,356	62.6	−3.3
Independent gain from AL				

=== Elections in the 1990s ===
General Election June 1996: Barguna-1
Party	Candidate	Votes	%	±%
AL	Dhirendra Debnath Shambhu	54,953	47.7	+7.3
IOJ	A. Rashid	28,479	24.7	N/A
BNP	Md. Abdur Rahman	18,703	16.2	−5.1
JP(E)	Zafrul Hasan Farhad	7,890	6.8	+5.2
Jamaat	Sultan Ahmed	2,659	2.3	N/A
Zaker Party	Md. Mojibur Rahman	1,160	1.0	−0.6
Bangladesh Muslim League (Jamir Ali)	Gaji Md. Abdur Rashid	450	0.4	N/A
CPB	Abdul Halim	441	0.4	N/A
Jatiya Samajtantrik Dal-JSD	Md. A. Shobahan	268	0.2	−3.1
Independent	Md. A. Sobahan	243	0.2	N/A
Majority		26,474	23.0	+9.3
Turnout		115,246	65.9	+20.6
AL hold				

General Election 1991: Barguna-1
Party	Candidate	Votes	%	±%
AL	Dhirendra Debnath Shambhu	44,722	40.4	
IOJ	A. Rashid Pir Shaheb	29,507	26.7	
BNP	Md. Fazlul Haq Sagir	23,540	21.3	
Jatiya Samajtantrik Dal-JSD	Humayun Kabir Hiru	3,661	3.3	
Independent	Kabir Ahsan	2,663	2.4	
Zaker Party	Mozibar Rahman	1,817	1.6	
JP(E)	Zafrul Hasan Farhad	1,746	1.6	
Independent	Zalal Ahmad	1,320	1.2	
Independent	A. Naser Azam Khan	1,169	1.1	
NAP (Muzaffar)	Md. Nurul Alam	340	0.3	
FP	Md. Nazmul Ahsan	129	0.1	
NDP	A. K. A. Aziz	91	0.1	
Majority		15,215	13.7	
Turnout		110,705	45.3	
AL gain from				
