= Amtali, Barisal =

Town and municipality in Barisal Division

Amtali আমতলী
- Municipality
- Location in Bangladesh
- Coordinates: 22.137°N 90.228°E
- Country: Bangladesh
- Division: Barisal Division
- District: Barguna District
- Upazila: Amtali Upazila
- Municipality established: 1998

Government
  - Type: Municipality
  - Body: Amtali Municipality
  - Municipal Mayor: Md. Motiar Rahman (Bangladesh Awami League)

Area
  - Total: 21.0 km^{2} (8.1 sq mi)

Population (2011)
  - Total: 21,808
  - Density: 1,040/km^{2} (2,690/sq mi)
- Time zone: UTC+6 (BST)
- Website: amtalimunicipality.gov.bd

Amtali (Bengali: আমতলী) is a municipality in Barguna District in the division of Barisal, Bangladesh. It is the administrative headquarters and urban centre of Amtali Upazila. The municipality was established in 1998.
