= AKM Jahangir Hossain =

Bangladeshi politician (1954–2020)

- আ খ ম জাহাঙ্গীর হোসাইন

State Minister of Textiles
- In office 1 January 1998 – 15 July 2001
- Succeeded by: Ministry merged

Member of Parliament for Patuakhali-3
- In office 29 January 2014 – 29 October 2018
- Succeeded by: SM Shahjada
- In office 14 July 1996 – 27 October 2006
- Succeeded by: Golam Maula Rony
- In office 5 March 1991 – 24 November 1995
- Preceded by: Mohammad Yakub Ali Chowdhury
- Succeeded by: Shajahan Khan

Personal details
- Died: 24 December 2020 (aged 66) Dhaka, Bangladesh
- Party: Bangladesh Awami League

AKM Jahangir Hossain (1954 – 24 December 2020) was a Bangladesh Awami League politician and a four-term Jatiya Sangsad member representing the Patuakhali-3 constituency.

== Career ==
Hossain was elected to parliament from Patuakhali-3 in 1991, 1996, 2001 and 2014 as a Bangladesh Awami League candidate. He was made the state minister of textiles in 1998 in the first Hasina cabinet. He did not receive the nomination for 2008 general election from Bangladesh Awami League for his support of reforms in the league during the 2006–08 Bangladeshi political crisis. The nomination went to Golam Maula Rony. In 2013, he was removed from all committees of Bangladesh Awami League.

Hossain died from COVID-19 complications during the COVID-19 pandemic in Bangladesh on 24 December 2020, at the Bangabandhu Sheikh Mujib Medical University Hospital in Dhaka.
