= Char Lakshmi =

Island of Barisal Division of Bangladesh

Coordinates: 21°57′N 90°33′E

Char Lakshmi is an island of Barisal Division of Bangladesh.
