= Anwar Hossain Howlader =

Bangladeshi politician

Member of Bangladesh Parliament
- In office 1986–1988
- Preceded by: Moazzem Hossain
- Succeeded by: Mohammad Yakub Ali Chowdhury

Personal details
- Party: Jatiya Party (Ershad)

Anwar Hossain Howlader is a Jatiya Party (Ershad) politician and a former member of parliament for Patuakhali-3.

== Career ==
Howlader was elected to parliament from Patuakhali-3 as a Jatiya Party candidate in 1986.
