= Nizam Uddin Ahmed (Awami League politician) =

Bangladeshi politician

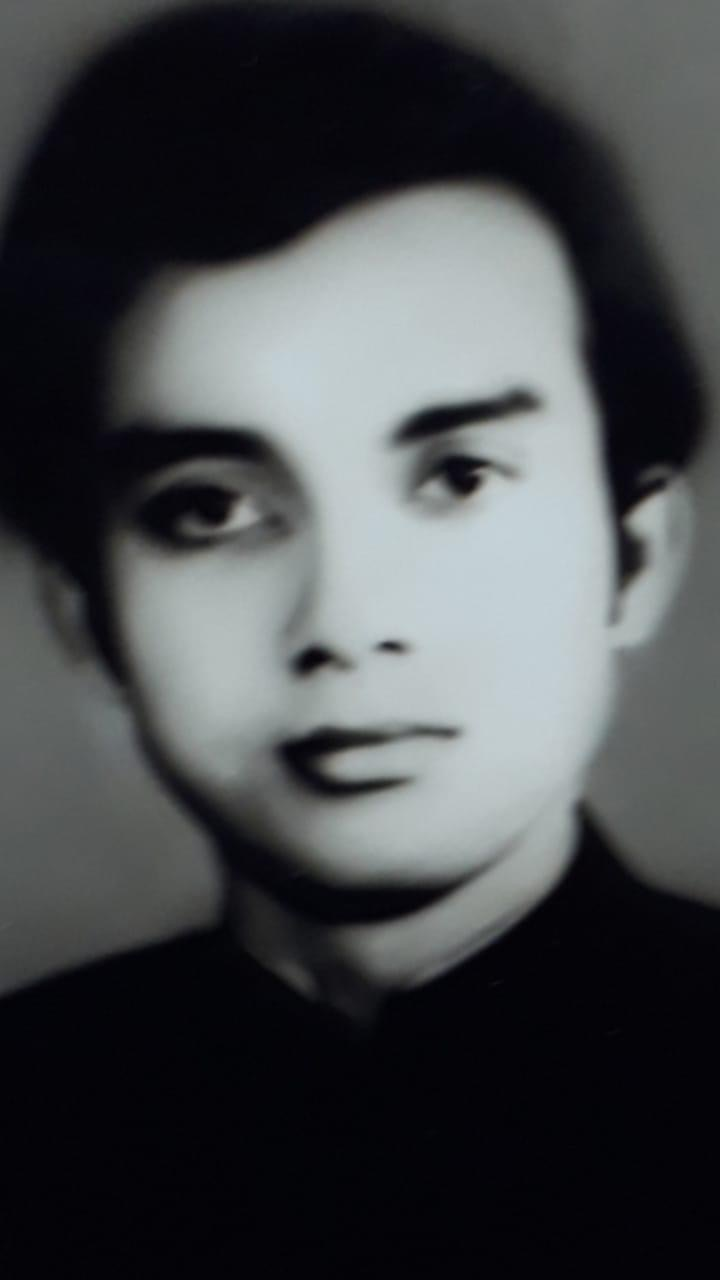

Member of Parliament for (Patuakhali-5)
- In office 1973–1975

Personal details
- Died: 9 December 1990
- Party: Awami League

Nizam Uddin Ahmed (Bengali: নিজাম উদ্দীন আহমেদ) was an Awami League politician in Bangladesh and a member of parliament for Patuakhali-5 and Barguna-3.

== Early life and career ==
Ahmed was born to Ismail Talukder (Badsha Mia), who was also a former MPA. He was elected to parliament from Patuakhali-5 as an Awami League candidate in 1973. He was later elected to parliament from Barguna-3 as an Awami League candidate in 1986. He was the President of the Barguna District unit of the Awami League.

== Death ==
Ahmed died in a road accident on 9 December 1990, in front of the Institution of Engineers, Bangladesh.
