= Abdul Majid Mallick =

Bangladeshi politician

Member of Bangladesh Parliament
- In office February 1996 – June 2001

Personal details
- Party: Bangladesh Nationalist Party

Abdul Majid Mallick is a Bangladesh Nationalist Party politician and a former member of parliament for Barguna-3.

== Career ==
Mallick is a professor.

Mallick was elected to parliament from Barguna-3 as a Bangladesh Nationalist Party (BNP) candidate in February 1996.

He sought the BNP's nomination for Barguna-3 in the 2018 Bangladesh general election.
