= M. Motiur Rahman Talukdar =

Bangladeshi politician (1946/1947–2025)

- মতিয়ার রহমান তালুকদার

Member of Bangladesh Parliament
- Incumbent
- Assumed office 2001

Personal details
- Born: 1946 or 1947 Barguna, Bangladesh
- Died: 17 November 2025 (aged 78) Dhaka, Bangladesh
- Party: Bangladesh Nationalist Party

M. Motiur Rahman Talukdar (1946 or 1947 – 17 November 2025) was a Bangladesh Nationalist Party politician who was a member of parliament for Barguna-3.

== Life and career ==
Talukdar was elected to parliament from Barguna-3 as a Bangladesh Nationalist Party candidate in 2001. He died in Dhaka on 17 November 2025, at the age of 78.
