= Habibur Rahman Mia =

Bangladeshi politician

Member of Bangladesh Parliament
- In office 1973–1979
- Succeeded by: Moazzem Hossain

Personal details
- Party: Bangladesh Awami League

Habibur Rahman Mia is a Bangladesh Awami League politician and a former member of parliament for Patuakhali-3.

== Career ==
Mia was elected to parliament from Patuakhali-5 as a Bangladesh Awami League candidate in 1973.
