= Taltali Upazila =

Administrative division in Bangladesh

Taltali তালতলী
- Upazila
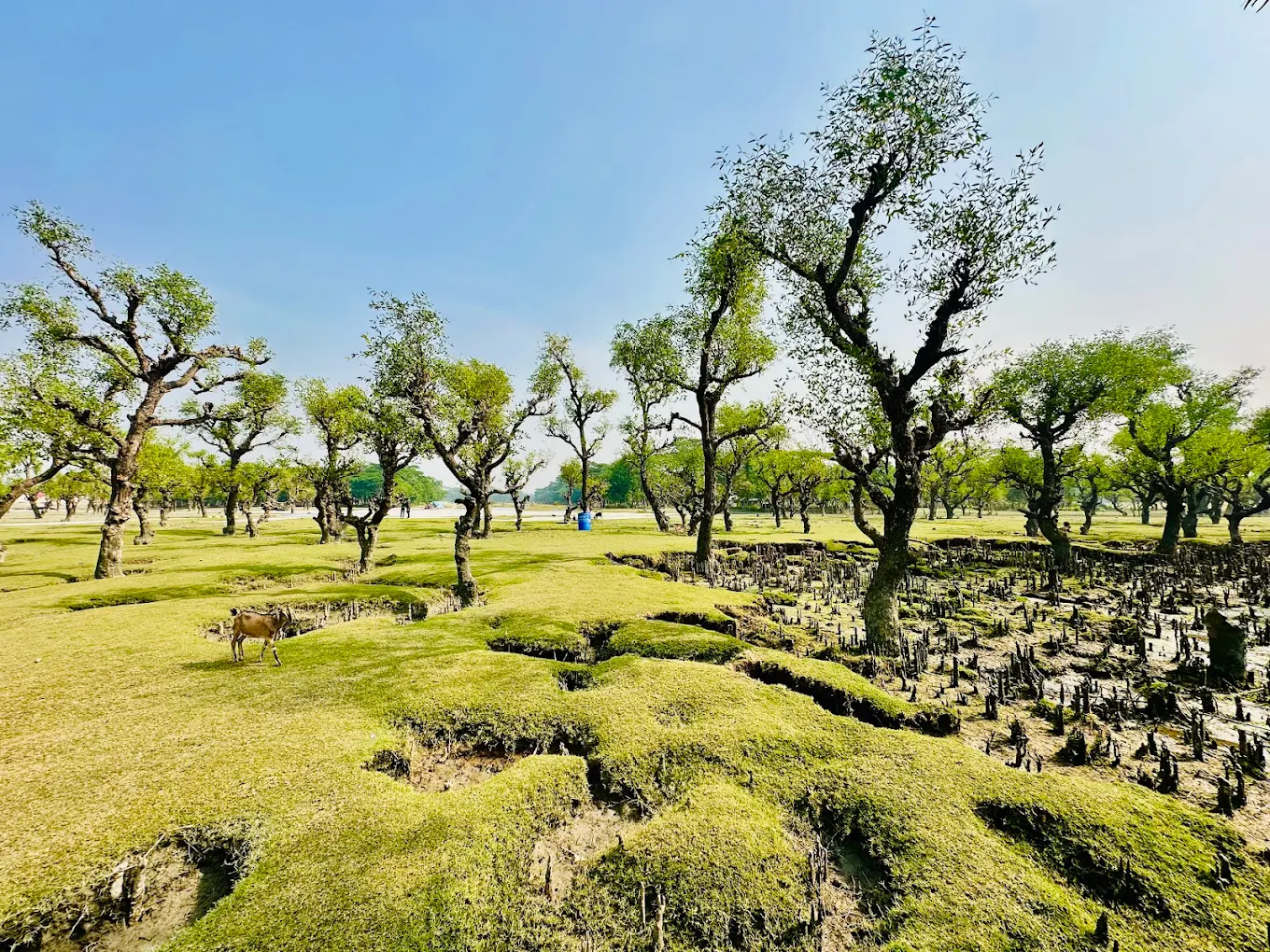
- Nidrar Char, Taltali

- Coordinates: 21.985°N 90.085°E
- Country: Bangladesh
- Division: Barisal Division
- District: Barguna District

Area
  - Total: 333.83 km^{2} (128.89 sq mi)

Population (2022)
  - Total: 119,403
  - Density: 357.68/km^{2} (926.38/sq mi)
- Time zone: UTC+6 (BST)
- Postal code: 8710
- Website: taltali.barguna.gov.bd

Taltali Upazila mauza geocode map

Taltali (Bengali: তালতলী) is the southernmost upazila of Barguna District in Barisal Division, Bangladesh.

== History ==
Taltali Upazila was established on 25 April 2012. It was previously part of Amtali Upazila.

== Geography ==
Taltali is at 22.0876°N 90.1770°E. It covers an area of 258.94 km^{2} with a population of 88,004 people. It is by the Bay of Bengal. Burishwar river and Barguna Sadar Upazila are on the west of it, while Andharmanik river and Kalapara Upazila of Patuakhali are in the east.

== Demographics ==
Religions in Taltali Upazila (2022)
Religion	Percent
Islam	92.04%
Hinduism	5.40%
Buddhism	2.54%
Other or not stated	0.02%

According to the 2022 Bangladeshi census, Taltali Upazila had 29,001 households and a population of 119,403. 9.34% of the population were under 5 years of age. Taltali had a literacy rate (age 7 and over) of 80.77%: 82.40% for males and 79.06% for females, and a sex ratio of 104.97 males for every 100 females. 31,673 (26.53%) lived in urban areas. Ethnic population was 977 (0.82%), of which Rakhine were 922.

As of the 2011 Census of Bangladesh, Taltali has a population of 88,004 living in 21,011 households. Taltali has an average literacy rate of 54.99% (7+ years) and a sex ratio of 1,013 females per 1,000 males. The population is entirely rural.

Muslims are 81,375 (92.47%), Hindus 5,611 (6.38%) and Buddhists 974 (1.11%). Most of The area is rural based. Farmers and fishermen are the leading professions. It has a natural forest reserve named Tengragiri Wildlife Sanctuary and a beach named Shuvo-Shondha. Many tourists come to Paira-Bishkhali-Bay of Bengal Mohona. Some 998 Rakhaine people are still living here.

== Administration ==
UNO: Sifat Anower Tumpa.

Taltali Upazila is divided into seven union parishads: Barabagi, Chhotabagi, Kariibaria, Nishanbaria, Panchakoralia, Sarikkhali, and Sonakata.

== See also ==
- Upazilas of Bangladesh
- Districts of Bangladesh
- Divisions of Bangladesh
