= Dhirendra Debnath Shambhu =

Bangladeshi politician

Member of Parliament for Barguna-1
- In office 25 January 2009 – 7 January 2024
- Preceded by: Delwar Hossain
- Succeeded by: Golam Sarwar Tuku

Deputy Minister for Food
- In office 1 January 1998 – 2001

Deputy Minister for Shipping
- In office 23 June 1996 – 31 December 1997
- Preceded by: ABM Zahidul Haq
- Succeeded by: Saber Hossain Chowdhury

Personal details
- Born: 14 December 1948 (age 77)
- Party: Bangladesh Awami League

Dhirendra Debnath Shambhu (Bengali: ধীরেন্দ্র দেবনাথ শম্ভু) (born 14 December 1948) is a Bangladesh Awami League politician and former Jatiya Sangsad member representing the Barguna-1 constituency.

== Early life ==
Shambhu was born 14 December 1948. He has a law degree and a M.A. degree.

== Career ==
Shambhu was elected to parliament from Barguna-1 as an Awami League candidate in 1991 with 44,722 votes while his nearest rival Mau. A Rashid Pir Shaheb of the Islami Oikya Jote had received 29,507 votes.

Shambhu was elected to parliament from Barguna-1 as an Awami League candidate in 1996 with 54,953 while his nearest rival Mau. A Rashid Pir Shaheb of the Islami Oikya Jote had received 28,479 votes.

Shambhu contested the 2001 election from Barguna-1 as an Awami League candidate but lost to independent candidate Md. Delowar Hossain. Shambhu had received 51,302 votes while Hossain had received 84,611 votes.

Shambhu was elected to parliament from Barguna-1 as an Awami League candidate in 2008 with 131,368 while his nearest rival Md. Delowar Hossain had received 80,590 votes.

Shambhu was elected to parliament from Barguna-1 as an Awami League candidate in 2014 with 85,080 while his nearest rival Md. Delowar Hossain had received 65,179 votes. In May 2018, he sued Emdadul Haque Milon, the editor of Kaler Kantho, after the newspaper published a report on corruption by Shambhu and his son, Sunam Debnath. He served as the deputy minister in an Awami League government. The Prothom Alo reported that he was involved with the theft from Test Relief and Food For Work. His son is accused of leading an organized crime racket in Barguna. The accused in the Murder of Rifat Sharif asked why Sunam Debnath was not charged in the case as they were following his directives.

Shambhu was re-elected in 2018 as a candidate of Awami League from Barguna-1 with 319,957 votes while his nearest rival, Matiur Rahman Talukder of Bangladesh Nationalist Party, 15,344 votes.

Following a confrontation between Additional Superintendent of Police Muharam Ali of Barguna District and Bangladesh Chhatra League activists, Shambhu supported the transfer of the police officer to Chittagong pending a departmental investigation.

Shambhu was arrested from Uttara in November 2024.
