= Barguna Sadar Upazila =

Administrative division in Bangladesh

Barguna Sadar বরগুনা সদর
- Upazila
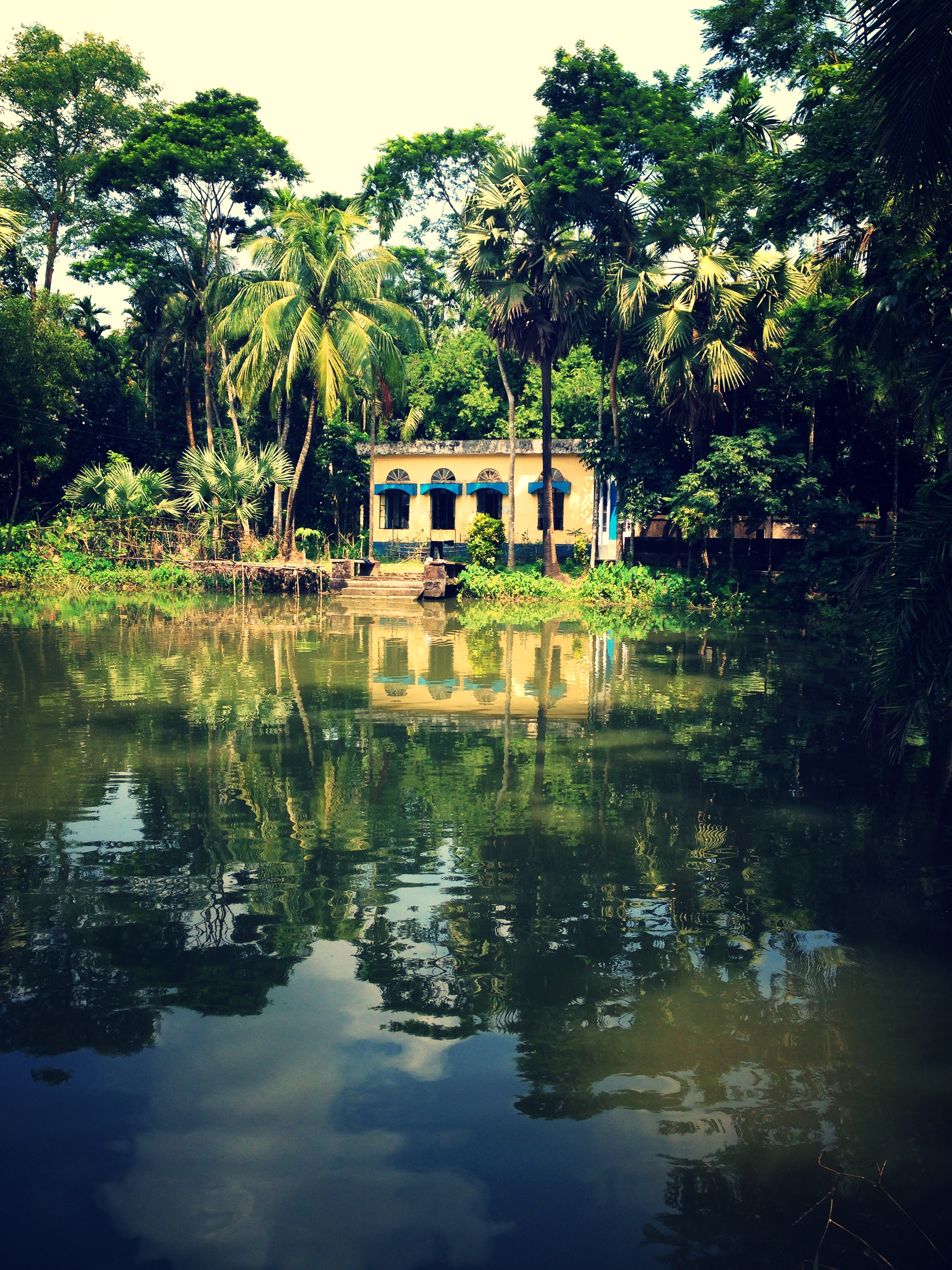
- Baitul Ekram Jamey Mosque, Barguna

- Coordinates: 22°9′N 90°7.6′E
- Country: Bangladesh
- Division: Barisal Division
- District: Barguna District
- Headquarters: Barguna

Government
  - Upazila Chairman: Muhammad Munirul Islam
  - MP (Barguna-1): Dhirendra Debnath Shambhu

Area
  - Total: 454.38 km^{2} (175.44 sq mi)

Population (2022)
  - Total: 294,375
  - Density: 647.86/km^{2} (1,678.0/sq mi)
- Time zone: UTC+6 (BST)
- Postal code: 8700
- Area code: 0448
- Website: Official Map of the Barguna Sadar Upazila

Barguna Sadar (Bengali: বরগুনা সদর) is an upazila of Barguna District in Barisal Division, Bangladesh.

== Geography ==
Barguna Sadar is located at 22.1508°N 90.1264°E. It has a total area of 454.39 km^{2}.

== History ==
In 1904, a thana (police outpost headquarters) was founded in Barguna. During the Bangladesh War of 1971, many people were murdered in Barguna town as well as Bengali fighters when retreating. 100 prisoners at the Barguna Jail were killed by the Pakistan Army on 29 and 30 November, and they were later buried in a mass grave to the west of the jail. By 3 December, Barguna had been captured by pro-independence militants. Barguna Sadar thana's status was upgraded to an upazila (sub-district) in 1983 as part of President Hussain Muhammad Ershad's decentralisation programme.

== Demographics ==
Religions in Barguna Sadar Upazila (2022)
Religion	Percent
Islam	93.48%
Hinduism	6.48%
Other or not stated	0.04%

According to the 2022 Bangladeshi census, Barguna Sadar Upazila had 73,658 households and a population of 294,375. 8.58% of the population were under 5 years of age. Barguna Sadar had a literacy rate (age 7 and over) of 82.28%: 83.85% for males and 80.77% for females, and a sex ratio of 96.54 males for every 100 females. 88,539 (30.08%) lived in urban areas.

According to the 2011 Census of Bangladesh, Barguna Sadar Upazila had a population of 260,830 living in 62,086 households. 56,337 (21.56%) were under 10 years of age. Barguna Sadar has a literacy rate (age 7 and over) of 58.6%, compared to the national average of 51.8%, and a sex ratio of 1036 females per 1000 males. 32,235 (12.36%) lived in urban areas.

According to the 1991 Bangladesh census, Barguna Sadar had a population of 219,729. Males constituted 50.7% of the population, and females 49.3%. The population aged 18 or over was 111,209. Barguna Sadar had an average literacy rate of 90.8% (7+ years), compared to the national average of 72.4%. The majority of its residents are Barisali Bengali Muslims, though there is a substantial population of Barisali Bengali Hindus as well as a minority Rakhine Buddhist community in Baliatali Union.

== Administration ==
Barguna Sadar Upazila mauza geocode map

UNO: Md. Shamim Mia.

Barguna Sadar Upazila is divided into Barguna Municipality and ten union parishads: Aylapatakata, Barguna, Bodorkhali, Burirchor, Dhalua, Fuljhuri, Gowrichanna, Keorabunia, M. Baliatali, and Noltona. The union parishads are subdivided into 51 mauzas and 191 villages.

Barguna Municipality is subdivided into 9 wards and 18 mahallas.

== Notable people ==
- Siddiqur Rahman (1951–1986), politician

== See also ==
- Upazilas of Bangladesh
- Districts of Bangladesh
- Divisions of Bangladesh
- Administrative geography of Bangladesh
