= Rangabali Upazila =

Rangabali রাঙ্গাবালী
- Upazila
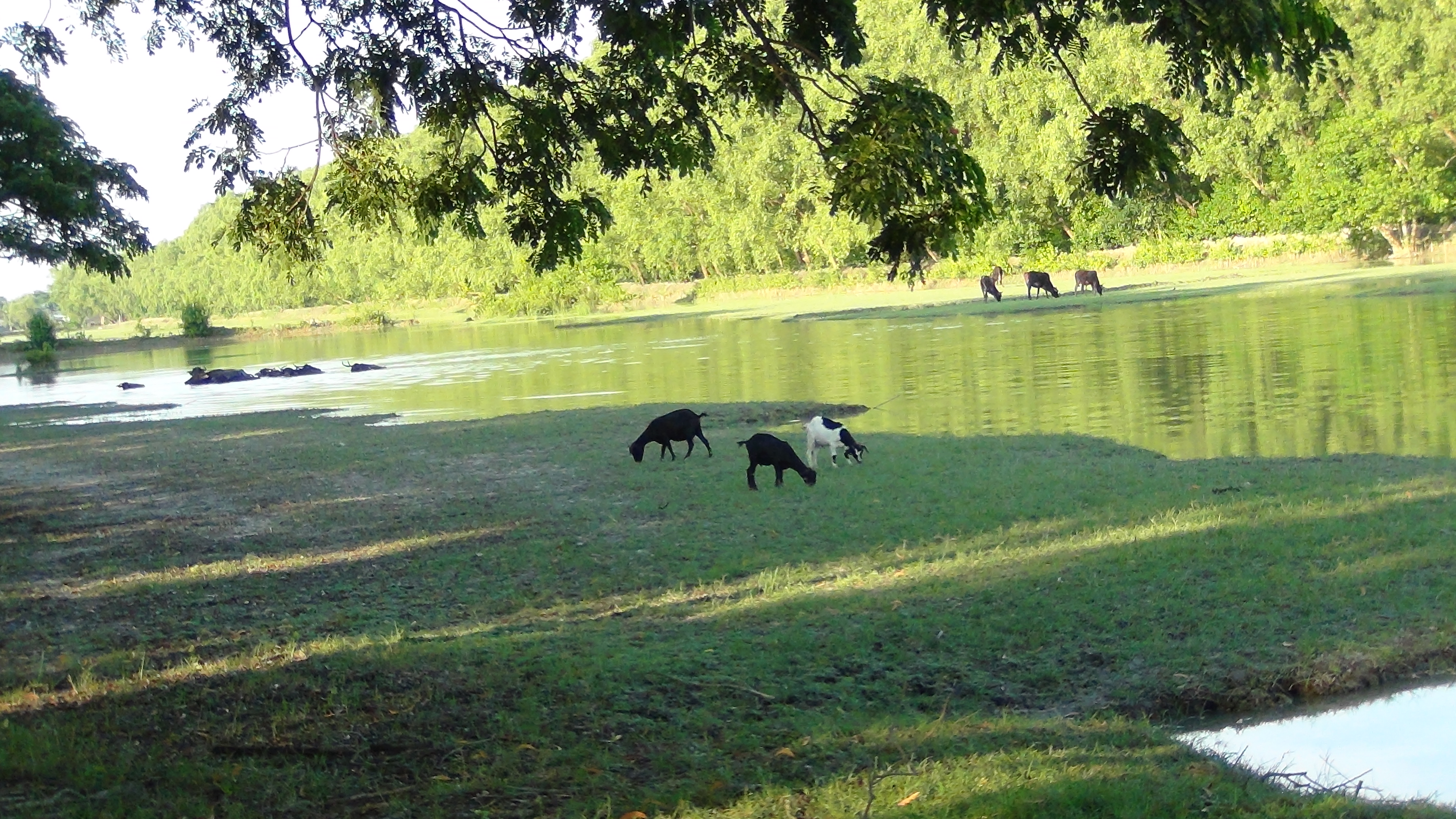
- Bhanga area of Rangabali

- Coordinates: 21°56′N 90°26′E
- Country: Bangladesh
- Division: Barisal
- District: Patuakhali

Area
  - Total: 343.69 km^{2} (132.70 sq mi)

Population (2022)
  - Total: 118,377
  - Density: 344.43/km^{2} (892.07/sq mi)
- Time zone: UTC+6 (BST)
- Postal code: 8640

Rangabali (Bengali: রাঙ্গাবালী) is an upazila of Patuakhali District in the division of Barisal, Bangladesh.

Rangabali Upazila mauza geocode map

== History ==
The exact history of naming of Rangabali Upazila is not known. However, it is said that due to the creation of new shelf in the sea, the sand of this shelf was red in the evolution of time. The word 'red' is locally known as 'ranga'. This is the origin of the name "Rangabali". Historians say that in 184, some Rakhine people fled the state of Arakan and settled in the area. From then on, settlement started in this area.

The administrative approval of Rangabali Upazila was given on 6 June 2011 at the 105th meeting of Nikar (National Implementation Committee for Administration Reform). Following this, Bangladesh Gazette was published on 13 June 2011. The upazila was inaugurated in 2012.

== Geography ==
Rangabali Upazila is located in the southernmost part of Patuakhali District in the chars of the Bay of Bengal. Chalitabunia and Agunmukha rivers and Char Biswas in the north, Ramnabad Channel and Kalapara Upazila in the west, Char Kurri-Mukri in Char Fasson Upazila in the east and Bay of Bengal in the south.

== Demographics ==
Religions in Rangabali Upazila (2022)
Religion	Percent
Islam	98.21%
Hinduism	1.73%
Other or not stated	0.06%

According to the 2022 Bangladeshi census, Rangabali Upazila had 28,323 households and a population of 118,377. 10.32% of the population were under 5 years of age. Rangabali had a literacy rate (age 7 and over) of 70.22%: 70.87% for males and 69.57% for females, and a sex ratio of 101.83 males for every 100 females. 815 (0.69%) lived in urban areas.

The current population as per 2011 Census of Bangladesh is 103,003 in 22,588 households. 26914 (26.13%) were under 10 years of age. Rangabali has 52,403 males and 50,600 females for a sex ratio of 966 females per 1000 males and a literacy rate of 40.77%. The entire population is rural. Muslims make up 101,046 (98.10%) and Hindus 1,868 (1.81%).

== Administration ==
At present there are 6 unions in Rangabali upazila. Administrative activities of the whole upazila are under Rangabali police station.

Unions:

1. Rangabali Sadar Union
2. Boro Baishadia Union
3. Chhoto Baishdia Union
4. Char Momtaz Union
5. Chalitabunia Union
6. Maudubi Union (formed from Bara Malikani beach Baishadia Union)

== Notable Social Organizations ==
- Rangabali Press Club
- Rangabali Youth Society (RYS)
