= Dhal Char =

Island in Bhola District, Bangladesh

Coordinates: 21.906°N 90.740°E

Dhal Char is the southernmost island of Bhola district in Bangladesh. The island has attracted the attention of researchers, environmentalists and tourists alike for its unique position as one of the country's remotest permanently inhabited islands, far out in the Bay of Bengal. It also one of the most threatened pieces of land in the world as a result of rising sea levels, due to climate change.

== Geography ==
Dhal Char is one of the numerous islands in the delta of the Meghna River in the wider Ganges Delta region. The nearest other bodies of land are Char Kukri Mukri to the northeast and Char Nizam to the west, both similar, albeit larger, islands.

The eastern part of the island is witnessing rapid river bank erosion due to strong tidal flow of the Meghna as well as inclement weather in the Bay of Bengal. The island is marked as one of the most vulnerable areas for natural disasters and is regularly pummeled by cyclones in the northern Bay of Bengal ocean. Similar to most islands in the area, the land is low-lying, and at high tides large portions of the island go under water. Much of the shore is mud flats on the eastern side, while the southern and western sides have extensive mangrove swamps, which check land erosion.

Dhal Char is a union parishad under the Char Fasson Upazila of the district.

== Transportation ==
Transportation from the mainland is possible only through boats. The nearest ferry terminal is Kacchapiya Ghat, about 35 kilometres (22 miles) away in southern Char Fasson.

== Demographics ==
Despite the resident population occupying only a fraction of the land area towards the northern tip of the island, Dhal Char is home to approximately 13,000 people.

- Floating people: 5000
- Households: 1500

Islam is the predominant religion. There are two mosques.

== See also ==
- North Indian Ocean tropical cyclone
- Climate change in Bangladesh
