= Char Fasson Upazila =

Char Fasson Upazila চরফ্যাশন
- Upazila
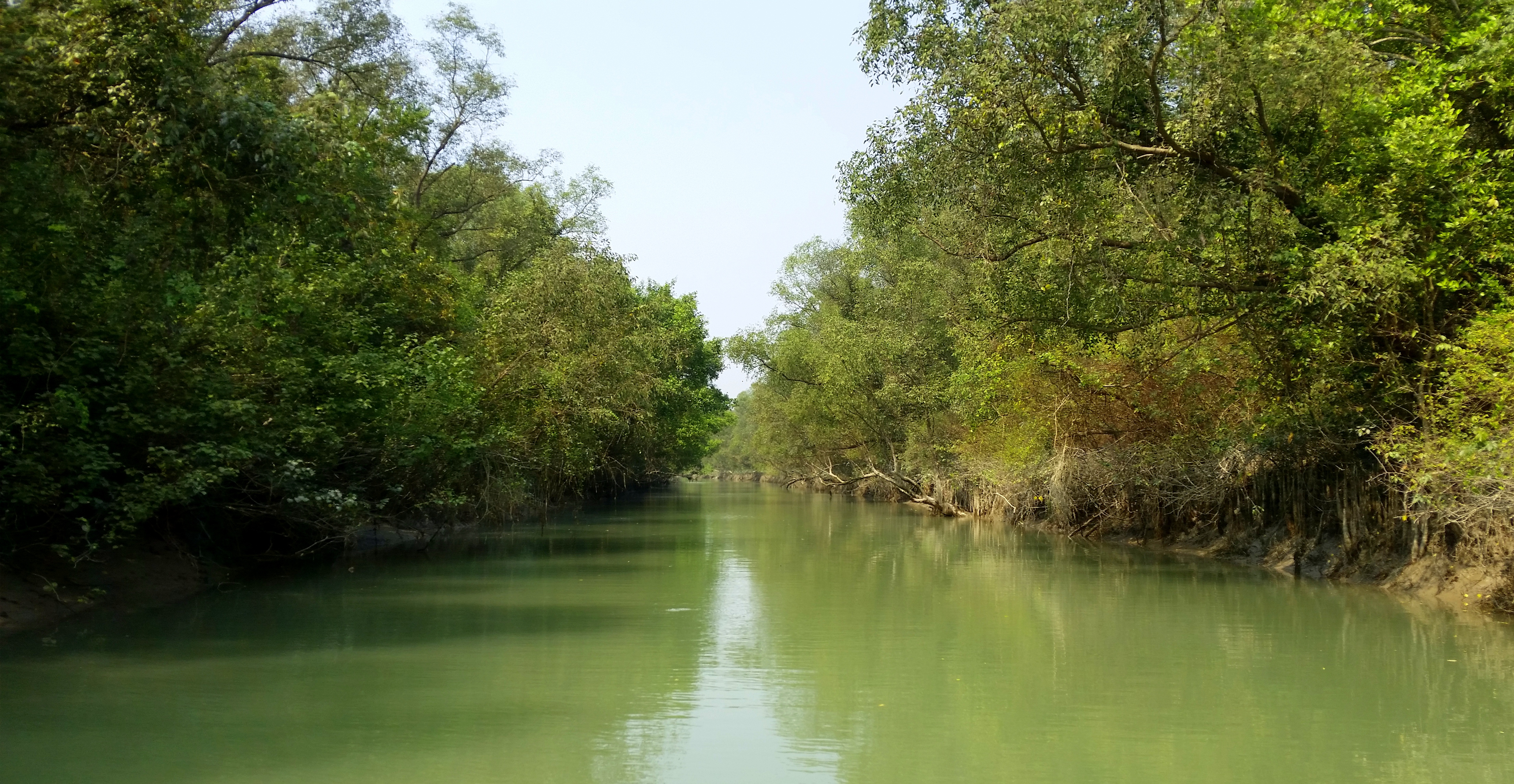
- Mangroves at Char Kukri-Mukri Wildlife Sanctuary

- Coordinates: 22°11.1′N 90°45.8′E
- Country: Bangladesh
- Division: Barisal
- District: Bhola
- Headquarters: Char Fasson

Area
  - Total: 1,440.04 km^{2} (556.00 sq mi)

Population (2022)
  - Total: 518,817
  - Density: 360.280/km^{2} (933.120/sq mi)
  - Male: 213,918
  - Female: 199,675
- Time zone: UTC+6 (BST)
- Postal code: 8340
- Muslim: 403,043
- Hindu: 10,505
- Buddhist: 10
- Christian: 15
- Others: 20

Char Fasson Upazila mauza geocode map

Char Fasson (Bengali: চরফ্যাশন) is an upazila of Bhola District in the Division of Barisal, Bangladesh.

== Geography ==
Char Fasson Upazila has area of 1440.04km^{2}, located in between 21°54' and 22°16' north latitudes and in between 90°34' and 90°50' east longitudes. It is bounded by Lalmohan Upazila on the north, Bay of Bengal on the south, Manpura Upazila, Shahbazpur Channel and Bay of Bengal on the east, Dashmina and Galachipa Upazilas on the west. There are more than 100 islands in the upazila. Among them are Char Kukri Mukri, Dhal Char, and Char Nizam.

== Demographics ==
According to the 2022 Bangladeshi census, Charfasson Upazila had 120,176 households and a population of 518,817. 11.27% of the population were under 5 years of age. Charfasson had a literacy rate (age 7 and over) of 67.62%: 67.68% for males and 67.55% for females, and a sex ratio of 100.49 males for every 100 females. 99,780 (19.23%) lived in urban areas.

As of the 2011 Census of Bangladesh, Char Fasson has a population of 456,437 living in 94,649 households. 128,696 (28.20%) were under 10 years of age. Char Fasson has an average literacy rate of 43.50% (7+ years) and a sex ratio of 996 females per 1000 males. 42,915 (9.92%) of the population lives in urban areas.

According to the 1991 Bangladesh census, Char Fasson had a population of 342,038. Males constituted 51.49% of the population, and females 48.51%. The population aged 18 or over was 148,319. Char Fasson had an average literacy rate of 25.5% (7+ years), compared to the national average of 32.4%.

== Arts and culture ==
Char Fasson has fifteen clubs, one library, six movie theatres, four theatres and one stadium.

== Points of interest ==
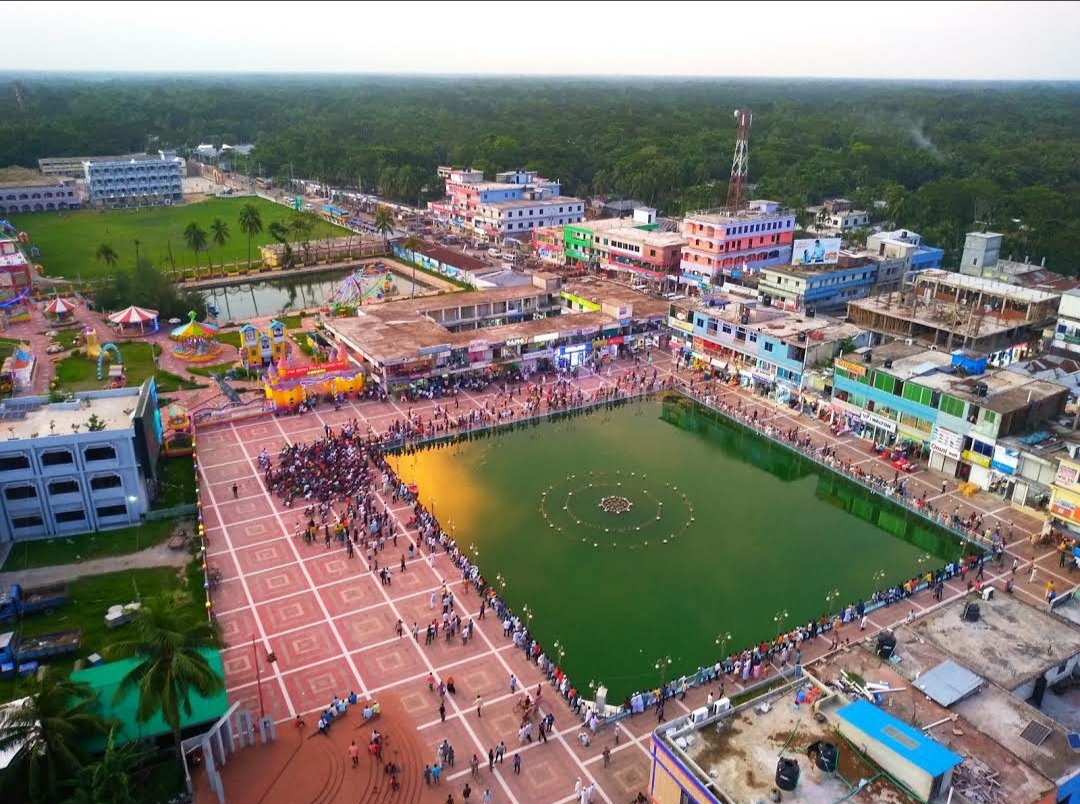
Fashion Square view from Jakob Tower

- Jakob Tower
- Fashion Square, Char Fasson
- Char Kukri Mukri
- Taruya Sea beach
- Charfasson Eid Gah
- Charfasson BM. Town-Hall
- Maya Bridge
- Charfasson Binodon Park
- Betuya launch ghat
- Ministry khamar Bari
- Char Kajur Gachiya
- Dakshin Aicha Thana
- Charfasson Bus Terminal
- Charfasson Samraj Gat
- Five Kopat Gat
- Char Patila
- Char Sondip

== Administration ==
Char Fasson Thana, now an upazila, was formed in 1970.

The Upazila is divided into Char Fasson Municipality and 19 union parishads: Abubakarpur, Abdullapur, Aminabad, Aslampur, Awajpur, Char Kolmi, Char Madras, Char Manika, Dhal Char, Hazarigonj, Jahanpur, Jinnaghar, Kukri Mukri, Mujib Nagar, Nazrul Nagar, Nilkamal, Nurabad, Rasulpur, and Osmanganj. The union parishads are subdivided into 68 mauzas and 77 villages.

Char Fasson Municipality is subdivided into 9 wards and 9 mahallas.

== Religious institutions ==
There are 601 mosques and 5 temples in Char Fasson Upazila.

Religions in Char Fasson Upazila (2022)
Religion	Percent
Islam	98.41%
Hinduism	1.58%
Other or not stated	0.01%

== Communication facilities ==
Roads

- Paved road = 96.80 km
- Semi-paved road = 50 km
- Mud road = 516.32 km.

== Education ==
There are eight colleges in the upazila. They include Char Fasson Govt. College, Dular Hat Adarsha Degree College, Fatema Matin Mohila College, founded in 1993, and Rasulpur Degree College.

According to Banglapedia, Charfashon Govt. T. Barret Model Secondary School, founded 1932, is a notable secondary school in the upazila.

The madrasa education system includes eight Fazil and two Kamil madrasas. According to Banglapedia, Charfassion Karamatia Kamil Madrasah, founded in 1945, is a notable Kamil madrasa and Hazari Gonj Hamidia Fazil Madrasah is a notable Fazil madrasa

== Media ==
Weekly

Fasson Barta (Defunct), Upakul Barta, Pratham Akash.

== See also ==
- Upazilas of Bangladesh
- Districts of Bangladesh
- Divisions of Bangladesh
