= Hazariganj Union =

Hazariganj হাজারীগঞ্জ
- Union of Bangladesh
- Nickname: ১০ নং হাজারীগঞ্জ ইউনিয়ন
- Location in Bangladesh
- Coordinates: 22°06′31″N 90°44′57″E
- Country: Bangladesh
- Division: Barisal Division
- District: Bhola District
- Upazila: Char Fasson Upazila

Area
  - Total: 70.994 km^{2} (27.411 sq mi)

Population (2001)
  - Total: 62,939
  - Density: 309/km^{2} (800/sq mi)
  - Male: 32,957
  - Female: 29,982
- Time zone: UTC+6 (BST)
- Post Code: 8340
- Website: hazarigonjup.bhola.gov.bd

Hazariganj Union is a union of Char Fasson Upazila under Bhola District.

== Area ==
The area of Hazariganj Union is 6,326 acres.

== Administration ==
Hazariganj Union is union parishad No. 10 under Char Fasson Upazila. Administrative activities of the union are under the jurisdiction of Shashibhushan police station. It is part of Bhola-4 constituency 118 of the National Assembly.

== Demographics ==
According to the 2011 census, the total population of Hazariganj Union is 30,396. Of these, 15,413 are males and 14,963 are females. Total families are 6,008.

== Education ==
According to the 2011 census, the literacy rate of Hazariganj Union is 42.1%.

Hazari Gonj Hamidia Fazil Madrasah is one of the educational institutions located in Hazariganj Union.
