= Charfassion Khasmahal Central Jame Mosque =

Mosque in Char Fasson, Bangladesh

Charfassion Central Khasmahal Mosque

Religion
- Affiliation: Islam
- Branch/tradition: Sunni
- Status: Active

Location
- Location: College Road, Char Fasson Upazila
- Country: Bangladesh
- Interactive map of Charfassion Central Khasmahal Mosque
- Coordinates: 22°11′10.10″N 90°45′30.70″E

Architecture
- Architect: Kamruzzaman Liton
- Style: Modern
- Established: October 20, 2023; 2 years ago
- Construction cost: ৳ 250 million

Specifications
- Interior area: 53,200 ft^{2} (4,940 m^{2})
- Dome: 1

Charfassion Central Khasmahal Mosque is located in Char Fassion Municipality, Bangladesh, serving as the central mosque of Char Fasson Upazila. It is situated on College Road, between Charfassion Upazila Mini Stadium and Jakob Tower.

Constructed in a modern architectural style with ceramic bricks, the mosque can accommodate approximately 4,500 worshippers. Twenty-five percent of the revenue from Jakob Tower is used by Charfassion Municipality for the mosque’s maintenance and management.

Construction began in 2018 and, at a cost of 250 million Bangladeshi Taka, took 5 years to complete. Charfassion Municipality contributed 100 million Taka. The mosque was officially inaugurated on 20 October 2023.

== Description ==
Designed by architect Kamruzzaman Liton, the Khasmahal Mosque is a four-story building with a basement, totaling 53,200 square feet. The adhan is broadcast from the top of Jakob Tower. It has a single dome with a spider-web-inspired design. The main entrance features a long, tall staircase made of white stone. LED lighting is installed both inside and outside for aesthetic effect, with fountains, flower gardens, and walking paths around the courtyard.

The main prayer hall can accommodate about 4,500 worshippers during salat. A separate prayer area is available for women with a capacity of 500. The mosque includes facilities for ablution for 200 people and dedicated rooms for imams and muezzins.

== Architecture ==
The Khasmahal Mosque is built in a modern style. Ceramic brick walls with perforations allow natural ventilation, reducing electricity use for lighting and temperature control. The interior uses a white cement coating mixed with dense stone pieces to maintain an eco-friendly environment. The dome is made of glass to allow direct sunlight, a first in Bangladesh.
