= Lalmohan Municipality =

Municipality in Barisal, Bangladesh

Coordinates: 22°20′28″N 90°44′00″E

Lalmohan Municipality লালমোহন পৌরসভা
- Municipality
- Interactive map of Lalmohan Municipality
- Country: Bangladesh
- Division: Barisal
- District: Bhola

Area
  - Total: 8.79 km^{2} (3.39 sq mi)

Population (2022)
  - Total: 32,462

Lalmohan Municipality mahallah geocode map

Lalmohan Municipality (Bengali: লালমোহন পৌরসভা, lit. 'Lalmohan Municipality') is a municipality in Lalmohan, Bhola, Barisal, Bangladesh. As of the year 2022, it had a population of 32,462.

== History ==
On 9 December 1990, Lalmohan Municipality was established.
