= Char Kolmi Union =

Union of Bhola District

Char Kolmi Union চর কলমী ইউনিয়ন
- Union
- Location in Bangladesh
- Coordinates: 22.1095°N 90.6388°E
- Country: Bangladesh
- Division: Barisal Division
- District: Bhola District
- Upazila: Char Fasson Upazila

Government
  - Type: Union council

Area
  - Total: 34.17 km^{2} (13.19 sq mi)

Population (2001)
  - Total: 19,419
  - Density: 568.3/km^{2} (1,472/sq mi)
- Time zone: UTC+6 (BST)
- Postal code: 8340
- Website: charkolmiup.bhola.gov.bd

Char Kolmi Union (Bengali: চর কলমী ইউনিয়ন) is a union parishad in Char Fasson Upazila of Bhola District, in Barisal Division, Bangladesh.

== Geography ==
The area of Char Kolmi Union is 8,443 acres.

== Demographics ==
According to the 2011 census, the total population of Char Kolmi Union is 19,419 Of these, 9,588 are males and 9,831 are females. The total number of families is 3,954.

== Administration ==
Char Kolmi Union is a union of Char Fasson Upazila. Administrative activities of this union are under Char Fasson police Station. It is part of Bhola-4 constituency 118 of the National Assembly.

== Education ==
According to the 2011 census, Char Kolmi Union has an average literacy rate of 36.9%.
