= Bhola Government College =

Government college in Bhola

- ভোলা সরকারি কলেজ

Location
- Yugirghol, Bhola-Char Fasson Road; Bhola, 8300; Bangladesh; 22.6705°N 90.6563°E

Information
- Type: Public
- Motto: Bengali: হে প্রভু জ্ঞান দাও (O Lord, give me knowledge)
- Established: 1962
- School board: Board of Intermediate and Secondary Education, Barisal
- Faculty: 45
- Enrollment: 8934
- Language: Bengali
- Campus size: 15.6 acres (6.3 ha)
- Campus type: Urban
- Affiliation: National University
- Website: bholagovtcollege.edu.bd

Bhola Government College is a government educational institution located in the area adjacent to Yugirghol, Bhola-Char Fashion Road in Bhola city. It was established in 1962, the college is the oldest school in Bhola District. form.

Nationalized in 1989. In this college higher secondary and undergraduate level educational activities are conducted. This college is affiliated to Bangladesh National University.

== Establishment background ==
With the aim of developing the backward population of Bhola, the largest island of Bangladesh, the then Deputy Commissioner Abdul Aziz and some enthusiastic people started Bhola College on 15 September 1982 with the Department of Science, Commerce and Humanities. Degree (pass) courses were introduced in the college in the academic year 1983–84.

The college was nationalized on May 7, 1989. The first phase of the college was established in 1962 at the present Abdur Rab Secondary School. After that, the activities of the college were fully started by constructing a tin shed house on the land purchased in the name of the college. In 1978, the construction work of the brick building was started and later the brick building was renovated to its present form.

== Campus ==
=== Academic building ===
Student accommodation

The college has two dormitories named 'Shahbazkhan Hostel' and 'Poet Nazrul Islam Hostel'. In addition, two new dormitories with 500 beds are under construction. The dormitories are run under the supervision of the Housing and Dormitory Committee. There is also a 20-bed dormitory for students.

Field

Inside the college is a huge historic college grounds. Different divisional level sports are held here.

Library

The library of Bhola Government College is one of the oldest libraries in the Barisal division. The college has a central and 16 departmental seminar library. The Central Library has 15,616 and the departmental seminar libraries have about 20,000 books. The college library also has daily, weekly, fortnightly and monthly magazines for the students.

== Faculties and departments ==
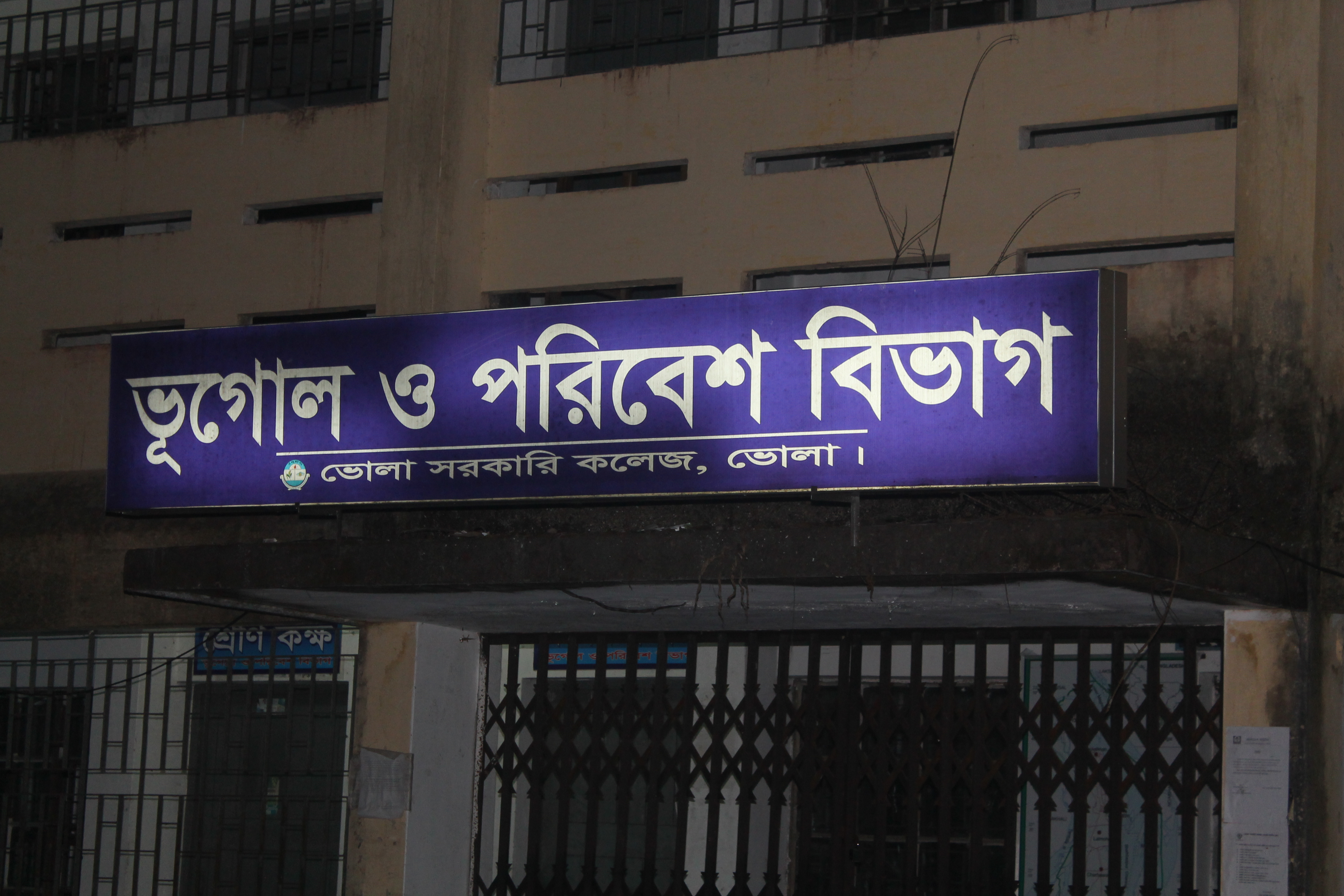
Department of Geography and Environment

- Department of Bangla language and literature
- Department of English language and literature
- Department of History and Culture of Islam
- Department of History
- Department of Economics
- Department of Political Science
- Department of Social Work
- Department of Mathematics
- Department of Philosophy
- Department of Physics
- Department of Chemistry
- Department of Botany
- Department of Zoology
- Department of Accounting Science
- Department of Management
- Department of Geography and Environment
- Department of Soil Science
- Department of Islamic Education
- Department of Information and Communication Technology

== Other infrastructural facilities ==
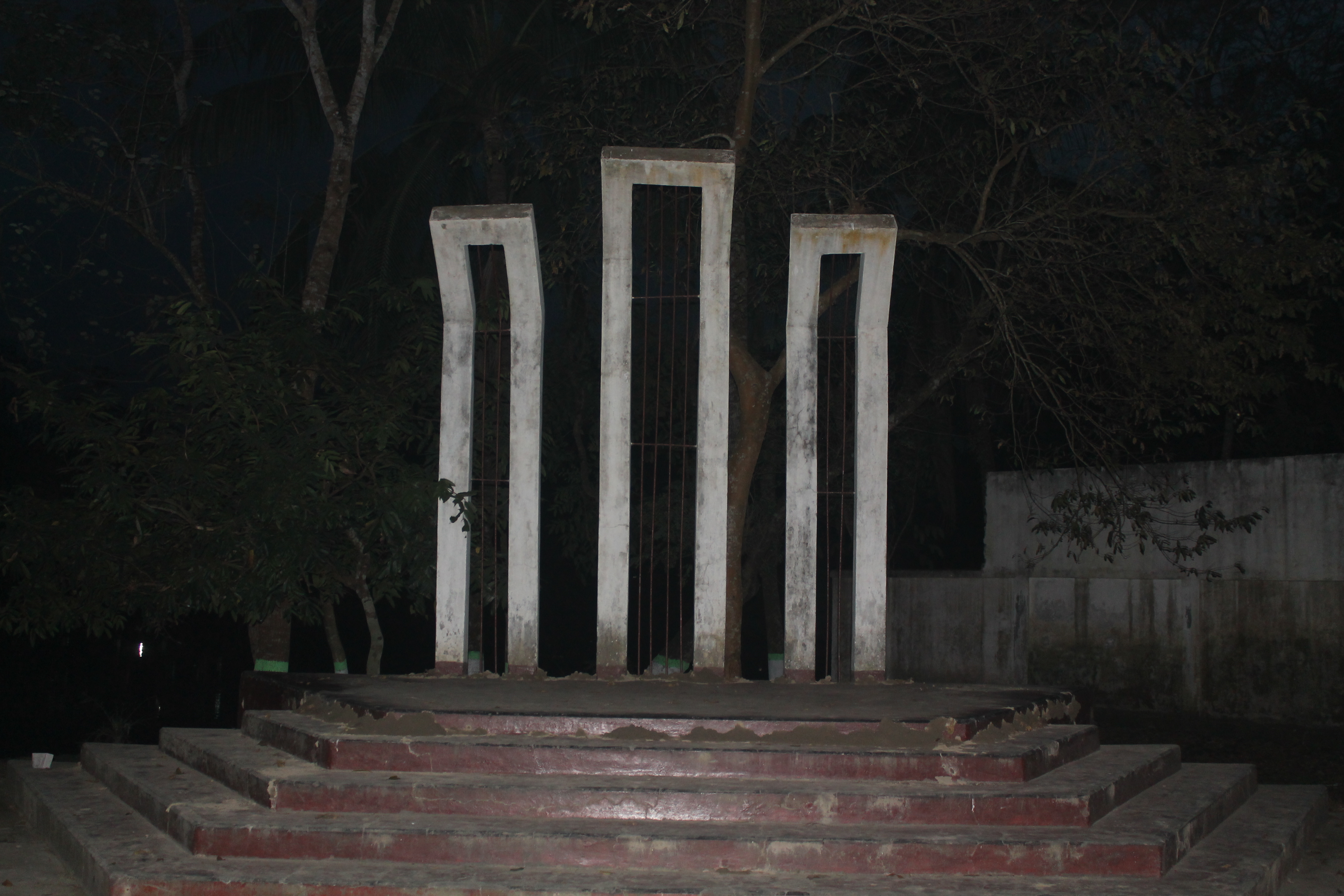
Martyr monument

- There is 1 mosque in the college.
- There are separate auditoriums for male and female students.
- Canteen
- Bicycle garage
- Shaheed Minar
- Science Lab
- Botanical Garden

== See also ==
- Char Fasson Govt. College
