= Jakob Tower =

Watchtower for tourists

- জ্যাকব টাওয়ার
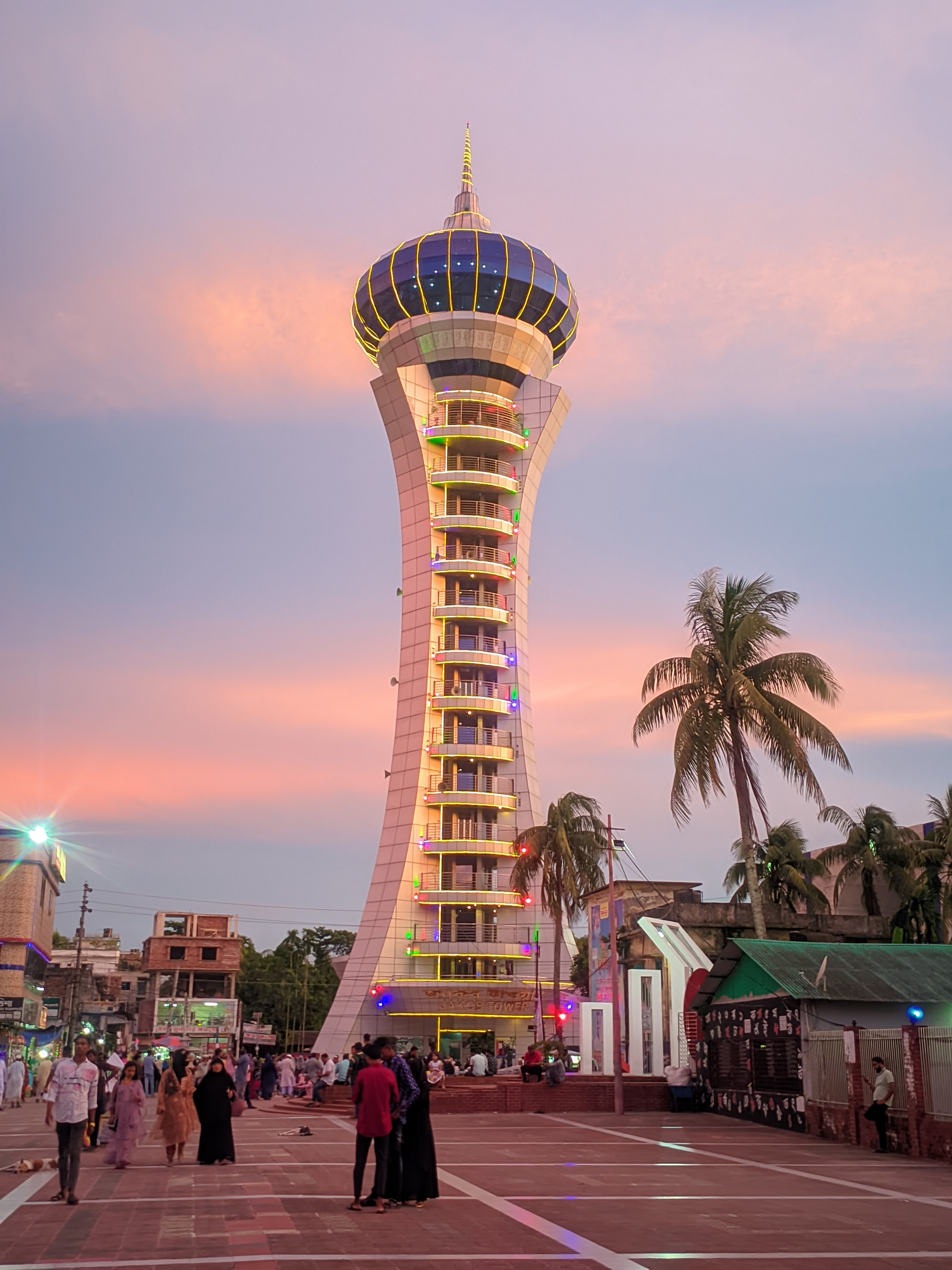
- Jakob watch tower day view.
- Interactive map of the Jakob Tower area

General information
- Location: College Road, Char Fasson Sadar, Char Fasson, Bhola, Bangladesh
- Coordinates: 22°11′10″N 90°45′33″E
- Estimated completion: 2018
- Opening: January 16, 2018
- Cost: 2.35 Million USD (approximately)
- Operator: Char Fassson Municipality

Height
- Antenna spire: 225 feet (69 m)

Technical details
- Floor count: 16
- Lifts/elevators: 1

Design and construction
- Architect: Kamruzzaman Liton

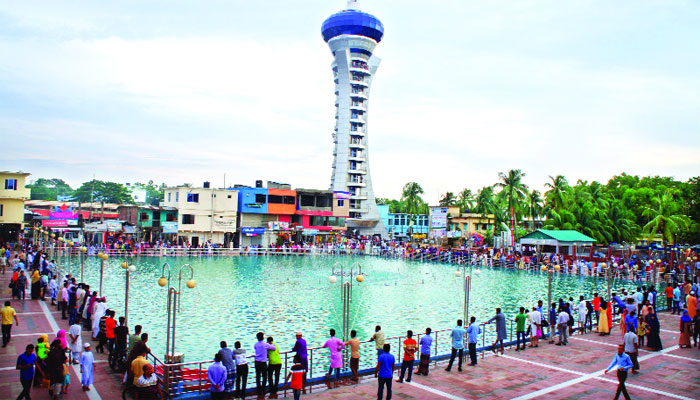

Jakob Tower (Bengali: জ্যাকব টাওয়ার) is a tourist watchtower located in the Char Fasson town of Bhola Island in southern Bangladesh. Natural beauty can be enjoyed from this tower up to an area of 100 km^{2} (39 sq mi). It is the tallest watchtower in Bangladesh as well as in the subcontinent. Built in the style of the Eiffel Tower, the 16-story watchtower can accommodate 50 visitors on each floor and 500 visitors throughout the tower.

== Location ==
The watchtower is located in front of the Khasmahal Mosque on Char Fasson College Road, an Upazila town on the shores of the Bay of Bengal, 60 km (37 mi) from Bhola district town.

== Naming ==
It was not called Jakob Tower at the beginning of construction. Former commerce minister Tofail Ahmed visited the tower under construction on May 16, 2017, and was impressed by the construction style and aesthetic beauty of the tower and named it 'Jakob Tower'. The tower is named after Bhola-4 MP Abdullah Al Islam Jakob.

== Construction and structure ==
Construction of the tower began in February 2013 at a cost of about 20 crore BDT. It is 225 feet (69 m) high. Char Fasson Municipality has implemented a tower construction project on an acre of land. The tower was designed by architect Kamruzzaman Liton. Built entirely on a cast-piling foundation 65 ft (20 m) below the ground, the tower can withstand a magnitude 6 earthquake. From the ground up to the dome-shaped watchpoint at the top of the tower, there is 5 mm diameter transparent glass on the surrounding aluminium.

== Tourism ==
An area of about 100 km^{2} (39 sq mi) can be seen from the top of Jakob Tower. Binoculars are available to see distant places. From here you can see the protected forests of Char Kukri Mukri, Tarua Beach, Char Piyal of Swapnadwip Monpura, Hatiya's Nijhum Island, and the Bay of Bengal.
