= Karpurkati =

Coordinates: 22.3584°N 90.5820°E

Karpurkati is a village situated in Bauphal Upazila under Patuakhali District in Barisal division. To its south is Dashmina Upazila, to the north there is Kalaiya and in the east there is the Shoula village and also the Tentulia River. According to the 2011 Bangladesh census, Karpurkati had 1,176 households and a population of 5,242.
