= Lalmohan Upazila =

Lalmohan লালমোহন
- Upazila
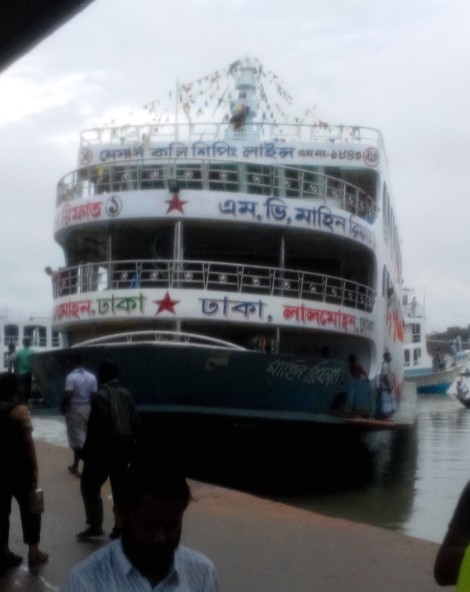
- Passenger launch docked at Lalmohan Launch Ghat

- Coordinates: 22°19.3′N 90°44.8′E
- Country: Bangladesh
- Division: Barisal Division
- District: Bhola District

Area
  - Total: 396.24 km^{2} (152.99 sq mi)

Population (2022)
  - Total: 297,692
  - Density: 751.29/km^{2} (1,945.8/sq mi)
- Time zone: UTC+6 (BST)
- Postal code: 8330
- Area code: 04925
- Website: Official Map of Lalmohan Upazila

Lalmohan Upazila mauza geocode map

Lalmohan (Bengali: লালমোহন) is an upazila of Bhola District in Barisal, Bangladesh.

== Geography ==
Lalmohan is located at 22.3211°N 90.7472°E. It has a total area of 396.24 km^{2}. The upazila is bounded by Burhanuddin and Tazumuddin upazilas on the north, Char Fasson upazila on the south, Manpura upazila on the east, Dashmina and Bauphal upazilas on the west.

The rivers Tentulia, Betua, and Boalia; Debnath Beel, Gatiar and Bhutar Canals, Shahbazpur Channel are notable water bodies here.

== Demographics ==
Historical population
Year	Pop. (000)	±%
1981	202	—
1991	252	+24.8%
2001	277	+9.9%
2011	284	+2.5%
Source: Bangladesh Bureau of Statistics

Religions in Lalmohan Upazila (2022)
Religion	Percent
Islam	97.08%
Hinduism	2.91%
Other or not stated	0.01%

According to the 2022 Bangladeshi census, Lalmohan Upazila had 69,850 households and a population of 297,692. 11.46% of the population were under 5 years of age. Lalmohan had a literacy rate (age 7 and over) of 64.63%: 65.59% for males and 63.76% for females, and a sex ratio of 92.62 males for every 100 females. 57,165 (19.20%) lived in urban areas.

According to the 2011 census of Bangladesh, Lalmohan Upazila has a population of 283,889 and they are living in 60,988 households. 78,309 (27.58%) were under 10 years of age. Lalmohan has an average literacy rate of 40.00% (7+ years), compared to the national average of 51.8%, and a sex ratio of 1,045 females per 1,000 males. 36,066 (12.70%) of the population lives in urban areas.

== Administration ==
Lalmohan, primarily formed as a Thana in 1919, was turned into an upazila in 1983 under Hussain Muhammad Ershad's decentralization programme.

The Upazila is divided into Lalmohan Municipality and nine union parishads: Badarpur, Charbhuta, Dholigournagar, Farajgonj, Kalma, Lalmohan, Lord Hardinge, Paschim Char Umed and Ramagonj. The union parishads are subdivided into 53 mauzas and 78 villages.

== Notable people ==
- M. M. Nazrul Islam, academic and politician

== See also ==
- Upazilas of Bangladesh
- Districts of Bangladesh
- Divisions of Bangladesh
- Administrative geography of Bangladesh
