= Ilisha River =

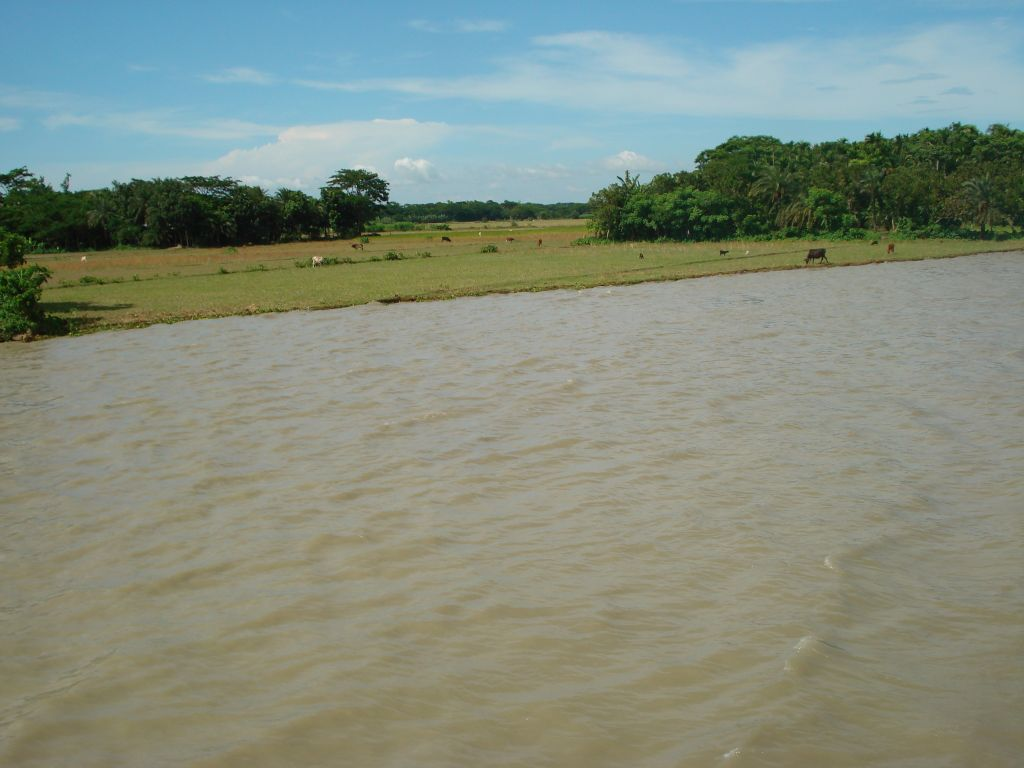
- Ilisha River, Bhola District

- Location within Bangladesh
- Native name: ইলিশা নদী (Bengali)

Location
- Country: Bangladesh
- Division: Barisal Division
- District: Bhola District

Physical characteristics
- Source: Meghna River
  - location: Bhola District, Barisal Division, Bangladesh
  - coordinates: 22°48′8.9″N 90°38′25.9″E
- Mouth: Tentulia River
  - location: Barisal, Bangladesh
  - coordinates: 22°42′2.7″N 90°34′5.8″E
- Length: 10 km (6.2 mi)

Basin features
- Progression: Meghna River → Ilisha River → Tentulia River → Bay of Bengal
- River system: Meghna River
- Tributaries
  - left: Goneshpura River
- Inland ports: Ilisha Ferry Terminal

Ilisha River is a distributary of the Meghna River flowing through the Bhola District of Bangladesh. The Meghna River takes the name "Ilisha" in the northwestern part of Bhola District. Flowing through the western side of Bhola and alongside the Tentulia River, it eventually drains into the Bay of Bengal. Together, these two rivers have turned Bhola-Shahbazpur into an island. Flowing west of Bhola as the Tentulia, the Ilisha River passes through Bakerganj, Bauphal, and Galachipa before reaching the Bay of Bengal.

== Course ==
The Ilisha River originates from the right bank of the Meghna River. After merging with the Goneshpura River, it takes the name Tentulia River. The river stretches for about 10 kilometers and flows up to the Mehendiganj area.

== Riverbank Erosion ==
For a long time, Rajapur Union in Bhola Sadar Upazila has been affected by erosion caused by the Ilisha River. According to local sources, over the past 25 years, thousands of acres of land and numerous homes across at least ten mouzas have disappeared into the river. Recently, the erosion has taken a severe form. A report published in the Daily Prothom Alo in August 2023 mentioned that around 250 acres of agricultural land were lost in just a few months, and at least 50 families had to relocate. In addition, Koralia Government Primary School, several mosques and madrasas, about 15 roads, and several culverts were damaged. Around 5,000 families are now at risk due to this erosion. The Bangladesh Water Development Board (BWDB) has stated that urgent steps are being taken, including laying geotextile bags, and a 5.5-kilometer-long embankment protection project is being proposed, which is awaiting approval from ECNEC.

== See also ==
- List of rivers of Bangladesh
