= Tarua Beach =

Beach located in Char Fasson Upazila, Bangladesh

Tarua
- Beach
- Location: Tarua Island, Char Fasson, Bhola, Barisal
- Offshore water bodies: Bay of Bengal

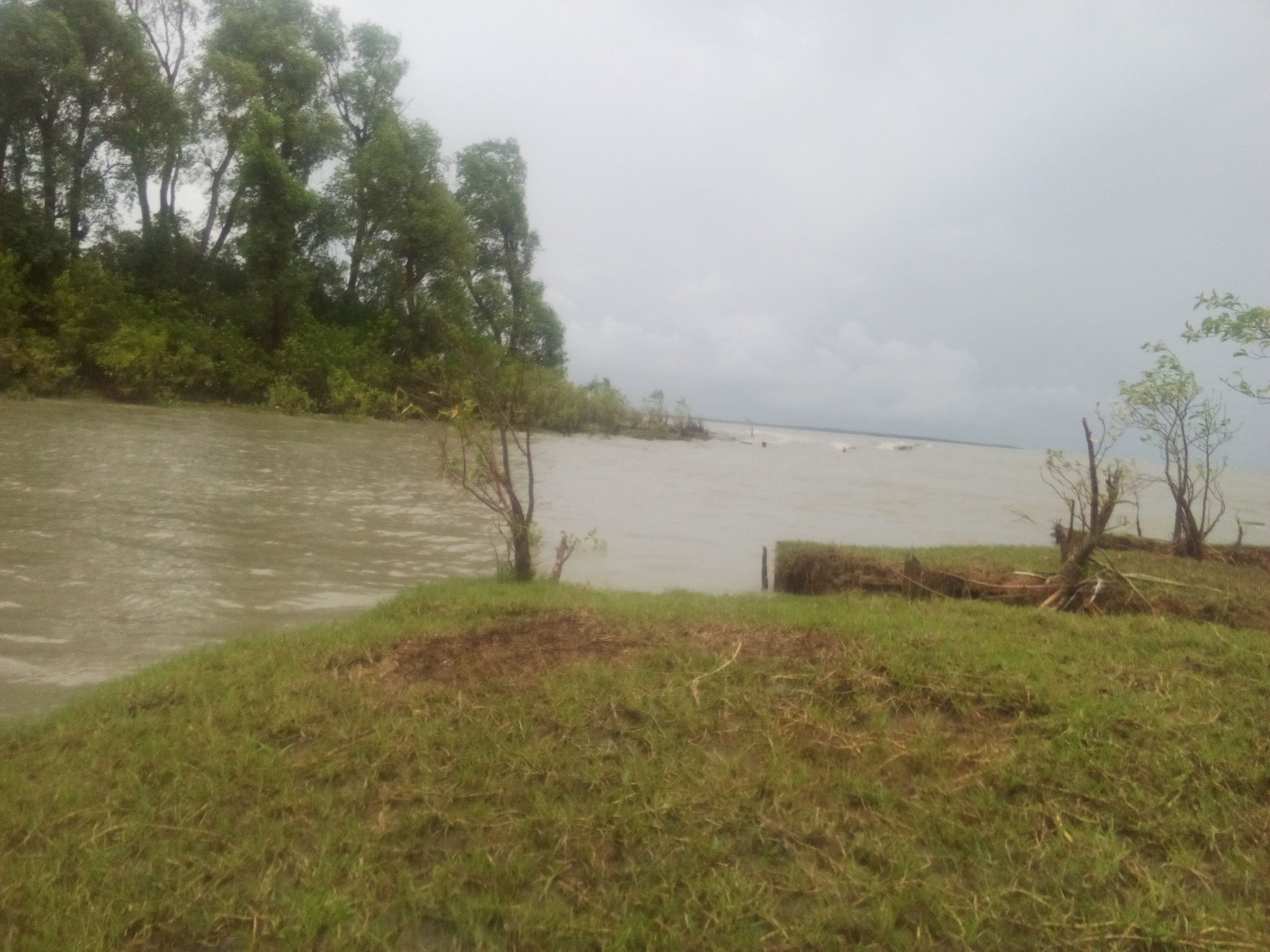
Tarua Sea Beach

Tarua Sea Beach is a beach located in Char Fasson Upazila, Bhola District, Bangladesh. It is situated about 150 kilometers from the district headquarters. After traveling 135 kilometers on paved roads, one has to cross 15 kilometers by boat to reach the beach.

== Tourism ==
At Tarua Sea Beach, tourists can enjoy the vast expanse of the sea, the chirping of various birds, sandy desert-like paths, and the dense greenery of the mangrove forest. Visitors can also experience diverse wildlife and the roaring waves of the sea. It is as if nature has decorated the island with its own hands.

Currently, Tarua Island has become one of the major tourist destinations in Bangladesh.

== See also ==
- List of beaches in Bangladesh
