= Nalini Das (revolutionary) =

- নলিনী দাস
- Born: 1 January 1910; Backergunge District, East Bengal and Assam, British India
- Died: 19 June 1982 (aged 72); Bangladesh
- Citizenship: Bangladesh
- Education: I.Sc.
- Alma mater: B. M. College
- Occupations: Writer, politician
- Known for: Participation in the Indian independence movement
- Notable work: Swadhinata Sangrame Dweepantorer Bandi
- Political party: Communist Party of Bangladesh
- Other political affiliations: Communist Party of Pakistan (1947–1971); Communist Party of India (before 1947)
- Movement: Indian independence movement
- Father: Durgamohan Das

Nalini Das (1 January 1910 – 19 June 1982) was a prominent revolutionary of the Indian independence movement in the Indian subcontinent and a leading figure during the period of armed resistance. In 1929, after an arrest warrant was issued against him in the Mechuabazar bombing case, he went into hiding. While underground, he was arrested in 1930 in connection with an attempt to assassinate the then Police Commissioner of Calcutta, Charles Tegart.

== Early life ==
Nalini Das was born in present-day Shahbazpur, Bhola District, Bangladesh. His father's name was Durgamohan Das. He began his education in Bhola. While in the fifth grade, he participated in strikes and was imprisoned. He passed matriculation from Bhola Government High School in 1928 and enrolled in the I.Sc. class at Brojomohun College in Barisal. He was also a noted football player in Barisal during that time. However, due to legal cases, he could not sit for the final exams.

== Work in the Communist Party of India ==
After being released from prison in September 1946, Nalini Das became an active and dedicated worker of the Communist Party of India. He worked with resistance committees in riot-affected Calcutta during communal violence.

== Activities in Barisal ==
After the Partition of India, Nalini Das moved to Barisal and became involved in peasant movements in the Bhola region. In 1950, during communal riots, he was sentenced to 10 years' imprisonment by the Pakistan government in a false case. Although he was released by the High Court, he was re-arrested at the prison gate. He remained in detention without trial as a political prisoner until 1955. After a brief release, he was arrested again and remained in prison until September 1956. He was finally released under the United Front government. In 1958, a warrant was again issued against him by the authoritarian regime of Ayub Khan.

Since 1958, while in hiding, he worked to organize the Communist Party in various villages of Barisal. He participated in the Bangladesh Liberation War in 1971. For the welfare of the people, he donated all his movable and immovable property to the Durgamohan Trust.

== Jail and underground life ==
Out of his 70 years of life, Nalini Das spent 23 years in imprisonment in places like the Cellular Jail in the Andamans, various jails in British India, India, and Pakistan. He spent over 20 years living in hiding. His book, Swadhinata Sangrame Dweepantorer Bandi ("Prisoner in the Islands during the Freedom Struggle") contains vivid descriptions of his 23 years of incarceration and 20–21 years of underground life.
