= Abdul Jabbar Chowdhury Bari =

Abdul Jabbar Chowdhury House

General information
- Type: Residence
- Location: Borhanuddin Upazila, Bhola District, Bangladesh
- Owner: Abdul Jabbar Chowdhury

Technical details
- Material: Brick, surki, and rod

Abdul Jabbar Chowdhury House is an ancient and historic structure located in Kutuba Union of Borhanuddin Upazila, Bhola District, Bangladesh.

== History ==
The ancestors of Abdul Jabbar Chowdhury settled in the Manika Union of the upazila. A man named Dhan Gazi from Uttar Shahbazpur first came to this region. His son Mon Gazi and grandson Barket Ullah later established a settlement in the current location. To solve the local drinking water crisis, Barket Ullah excavated a large pond, which is still in use today.

Barket Ullah’s son, Jibon Hawladar, purchased government land and built the first brick house. His middle son, Tamizuddin, expanded the property. Tamizuddin’s son, Abdul Jabbar Mia, became a wealthy landowner and earned the title “Chowdhury.” In 1927, he purchased the property from the then Bakerganj District Board, and in 1931, he was declared owner and possessor by verdict No. 95 of the Calcutta court. His estate eventually expanded to about four thousand acres.

Abdul Jabbar Chowdhury was born in 1255 Bengali Year and died in 1341 Bengali Year at the age of 96. Before his death, in 1337 Bengali Year, he endowed all his zamindari properties as waqf. In 1972, Abdul Jabbar Government College was established on about 50 acres of this waqf land.

Among his four sons, Mojibur Haque Chowdhury was elected a member of the East Bengal Legislative Assembly in the 1954 election from the United Front. Mojibur Haque Chowdhury’s son, Reza-e-Karim Chowdhury (Chunnu Mia), was a language movement activist and was elected a member of the Provincial Assembly in the 1970 election.

Although the zamindari system was abolished, the entire house still stands in the traditional zamindar style, and the descendants of the family continue to live there.

== Architecture ==
The house consists of 12 rooms of two to three stories. The structure is built with brick, surki, iron, and wood. Each room is adorned with artistic decorations. The house was constructed in phases between Bengali years 1319 and 1351.
