= Independence Museum =

Museum in Bhola, Bangladesh

Independence Museum is a museum and research center located at Banglabazar in Bhola District, Bangladesh. The museum preserves and exhibits documents and photographs from the anti-British movement up to the Liberation War of Bangladesh.

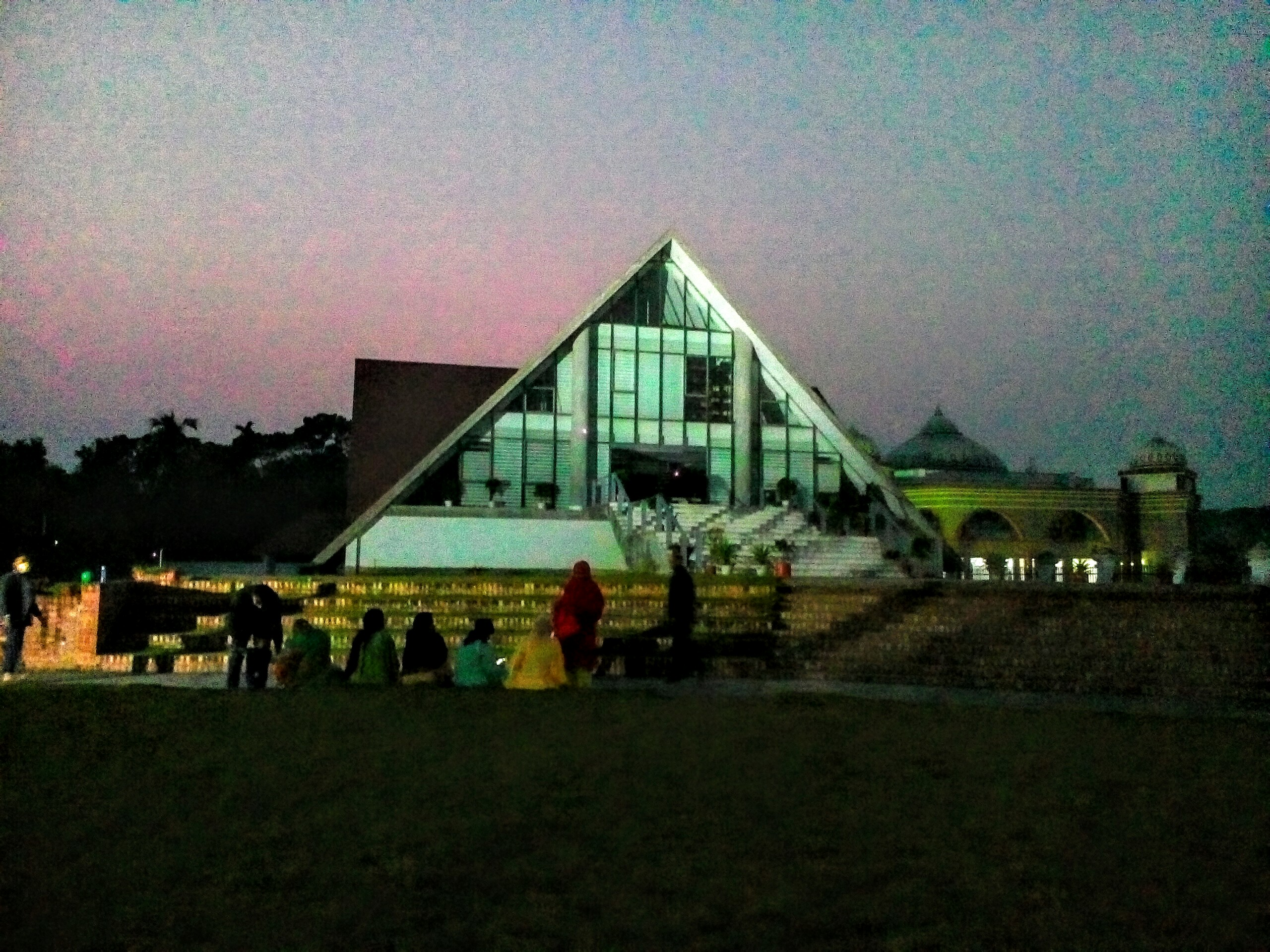
Independence Museum, Bhola.

== History ==
Around 2015, the construction of the museum began at Fatema Khanom Complex in Banglabazar, Bhola, named after the mother of then Commerce Minister Tofail Ahmed. The foundation stone was laid by the then Finance Minister Abul Maal Abdul Muhith. Historian Dr. Muntassir Mamoon and several other researchers contributed to enriching the museum’s collections.

The museum, built to preserve the history of the Liberation War, was inaugurated on 25 January 2018 by the President of Bangladesh, Abdul Hamid.

== Description ==
The Independence Museum of Bhola preserves rare photographs of Bengali heritage, the Liberation War, and the contribution of Bangabandhu. The continuous process of achieving Bangladesh’s independence over 80 years is displayed through documents, photographs, and digital exhibitions.

The museum has three galleries. On the first floor, one section displays heritage, archaeological artifacts, the anti-British movement, the Partition of 1947, and rare photographs and documents of the Language Movement. On the other side, there is a library and research center. This floor also has a multimedia display hall.

The second floor exhibits visual representations of key historical events from the Language Movement to the Liberation War. The third floor displays the movements of 1958, military rule in Pakistan, the Six-Point Movement of 1966, the Mass Uprising of 1969, the Election of 1970, the 7 March Speech, the Liberation War of 1971, and rare photographs of Sheikh Mujibur Rahman at different times. This floor also hosts digital displays of all speeches by Bangabandhu in audio and video format.
