= Nizam-Hasina Foundation Mosque =

Mosque in Ukil Para, Bhola Sadar, Bhola, Bangladesh

Nizam Hasina Foundation Mosque
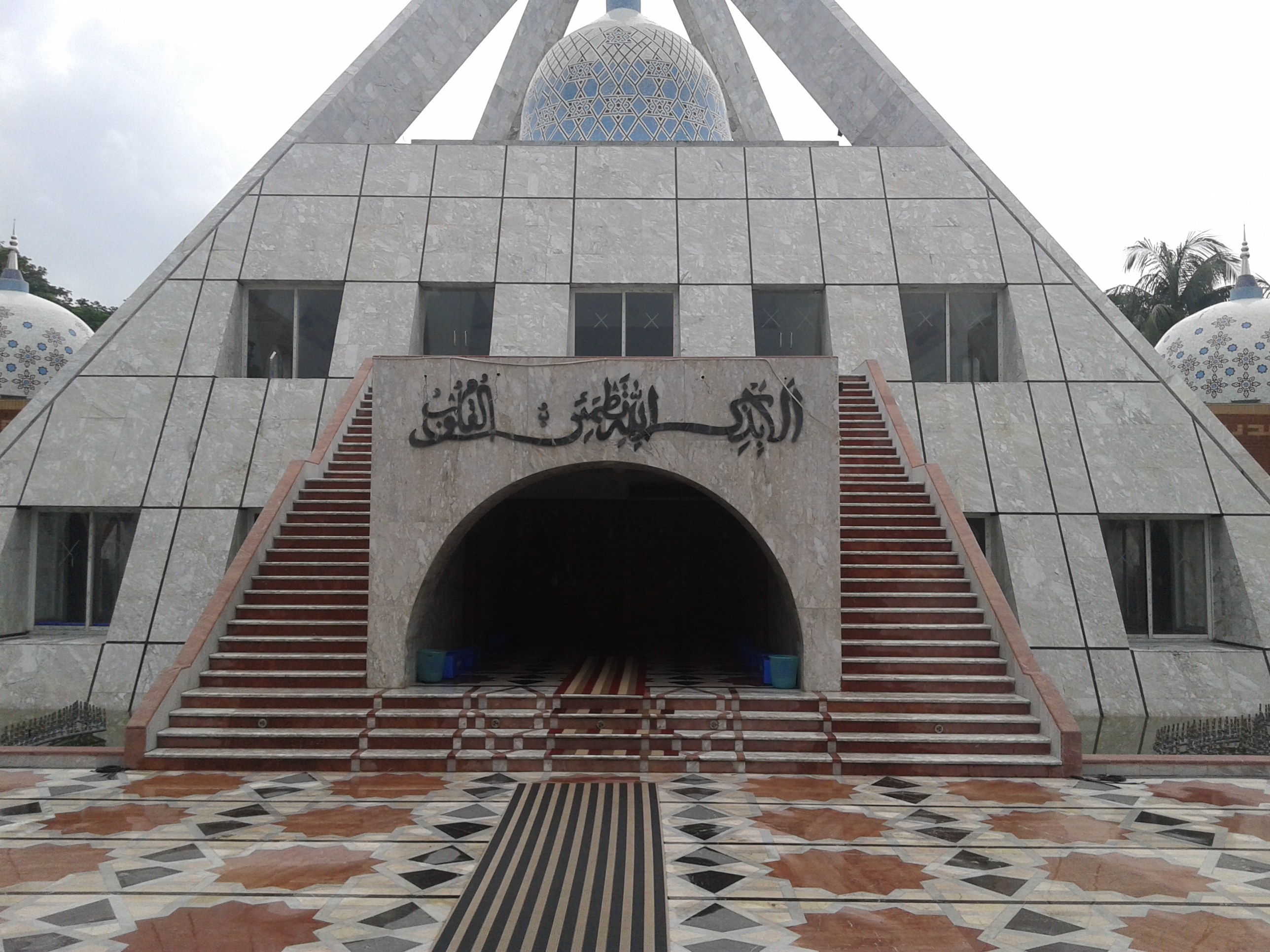

Religion
- Affiliation: Islam
- Ownership: Nizam Hasina Foundation

Location
- Location: Ukil Para, Bhola Sadar Upazila, Bhola District
- Interactive map of Nizam Hasina Foundation Mosque
- Coordinates: 22°40′42″N 90°38′59″E

Architecture
- Architect: Kamruzzaman Liton
- Type: Mosque
- Style: Modern traditional architecture
- Groundbreaking: 1 June 2010
- Completed: 30 December 2016
- Construction cost: Approximately 300 million BDT

Specifications
- Capacity: 1,500
- Dome: 4
- Dome height (inner): 60 feet
- Minaret: 2
- Minaret height: 120 feet
- Materials: Brick, sand, marble stone, cement

Nizam Hasina Foundation Mosque is a mosque located in Ukil Para, Bhola Sadar Upazila, Bhola District, Bangladesh. It is a modern mosque built with funding from the Nizam Hasina Foundation.

== History ==
The mosque was built on 24,000 square feet or 1.5 acres of land with the financial assistance of the Nizam Hasina Foundation, established by businessman Nizamuddin Ahmed and his family. Construction of the mosque began in June 2010, and was inaugurated in December 2016 by Tofail Ahmed, Ali Azam Mukul, and the Imam of Baitul Mukarram National Mosque. The construction cost was approximately 300 million BDT. Around 52,000 laborers worked for seven years to complete the mosque.

== Architecture ==
Architectural engineer Kamruzzaman Liton designed the mosque, which is constructed with marble and other expensive stones featuring modern architectural artistry. The mosque is two-storied, with two minarets of 120 feet and four domes of 60 feet. Separate prayer areas and ablution spaces are provided for men and women. It also includes an Islamic library, a modern Hifzkhana (Qur’an memorization center), and a bathing area for those observing Itikaf during Ramadan. The mosque has three doors, two gates, two rooms for the khatib, imam, and muezzin, and an office for the foundation’s chairman. The mosque is illuminated at night and surrounded by flowering plants.

== See also ==
- List of mosques in Bangladesh
