= Manpura Island =

Island in Bhola District, Bangladesh

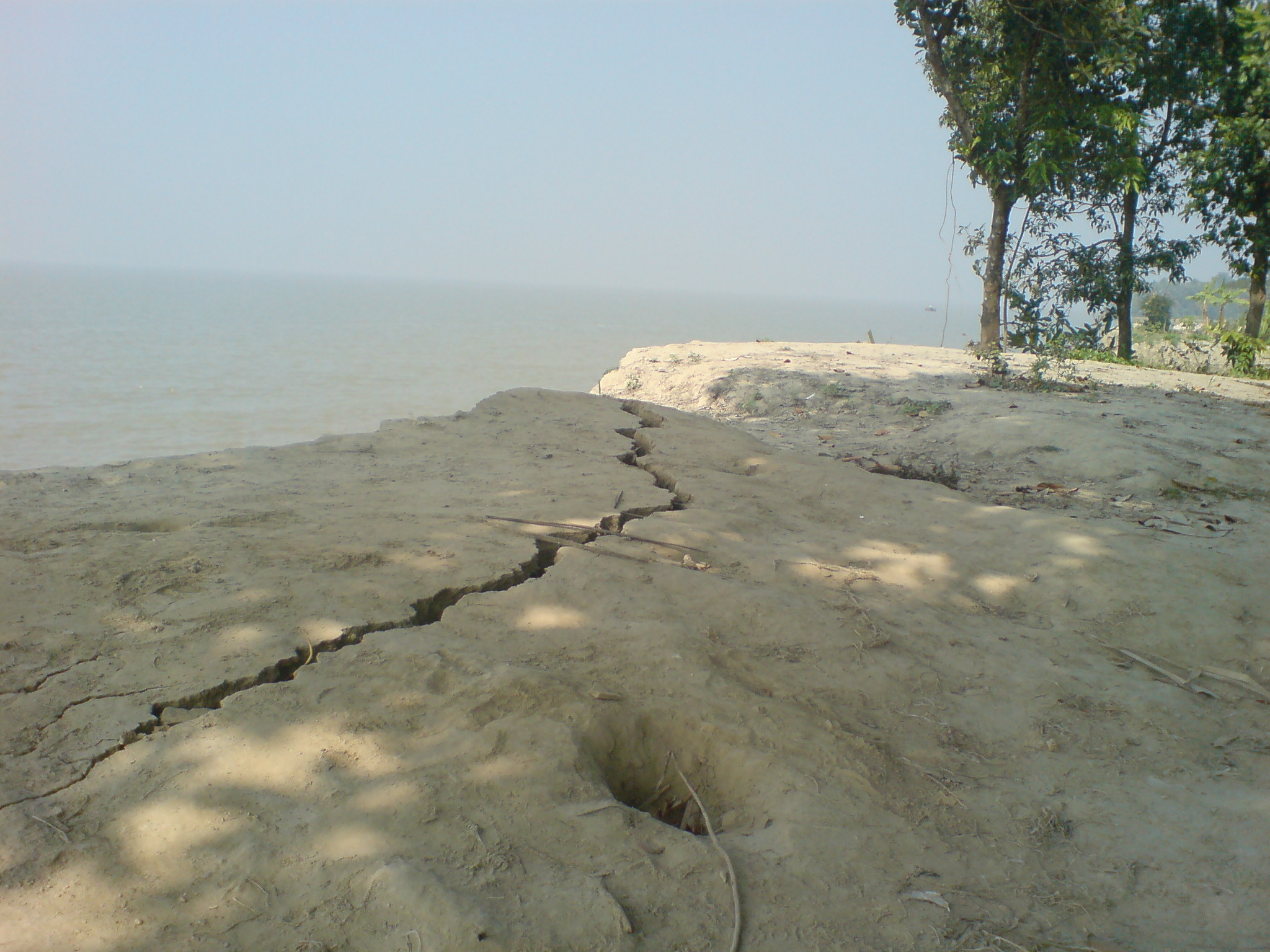
- Soil on the verge of erosion along the shore
- Interactive map of Manpura Island

Geography
- Location: Bay of Bengal
- Coordinates: 22°18′N 90°58′E
- Area: 373 km^{2} (144 sq mi)

Administration
- Bangladesh
- Division: Barisal
- District: Bhola

Demographics
- Population: 76,582 (2011)
- Pop. density: 205.3/km^{2} (531.7/sq mi)
- Ethnic groups: Bengalis

Additional information
- Time zone: BST (UTC+6)

Manpura Island is an island in the northern Bay of Bengal, Bangladesh, at the mouth of the Meghna river. It consists of Manpura upazila, Bhola District. The name of Monpura was driven from Moin Gazi, a leaser of this island. The island has an area of 373 km^{2}. Other major offshore islands of this region are Bhola Island (which is the largest) and Hatia Island. All of these islands are densely populated.

== Nature ==
The island has a high rate of erosion. Studies made from 1973 to 2010 have shown the proof of the islands threat of land erosion.

=== Bhola Cyclone ===
The Bhola Cyclone hit Manpura Island in 1970. The first person to notice it on the island was Kammaluddin Chodhur Y, a farmer who saw a glow in the distance before realizing it was a wave from the cyclone.

=== Renewable energy ===
The island is set to be the first island in Bangladesh to be powered only by renewable energy by 2021. The Sustainable and Renewable Energy Development Authority have started traveling throughout the island to share the energy. It first started on October 1, 2019.

== Crime ==
This island has experienced pirate attacks. In 2005, pirates looted Tk 20 lakh ($23,690.58) and kidnapped five fisherman.

On October 28, 2009, a woman was gang raped by multiple passengers of a speed boat while heading to Manpura Island.

== See also ==
- List of islands of Bangladesh
