= Charfasson Government College =

Government college in Bangladesh

Char Fasson Govt. College
- চরফ্যাসন সরকারি কলেজ
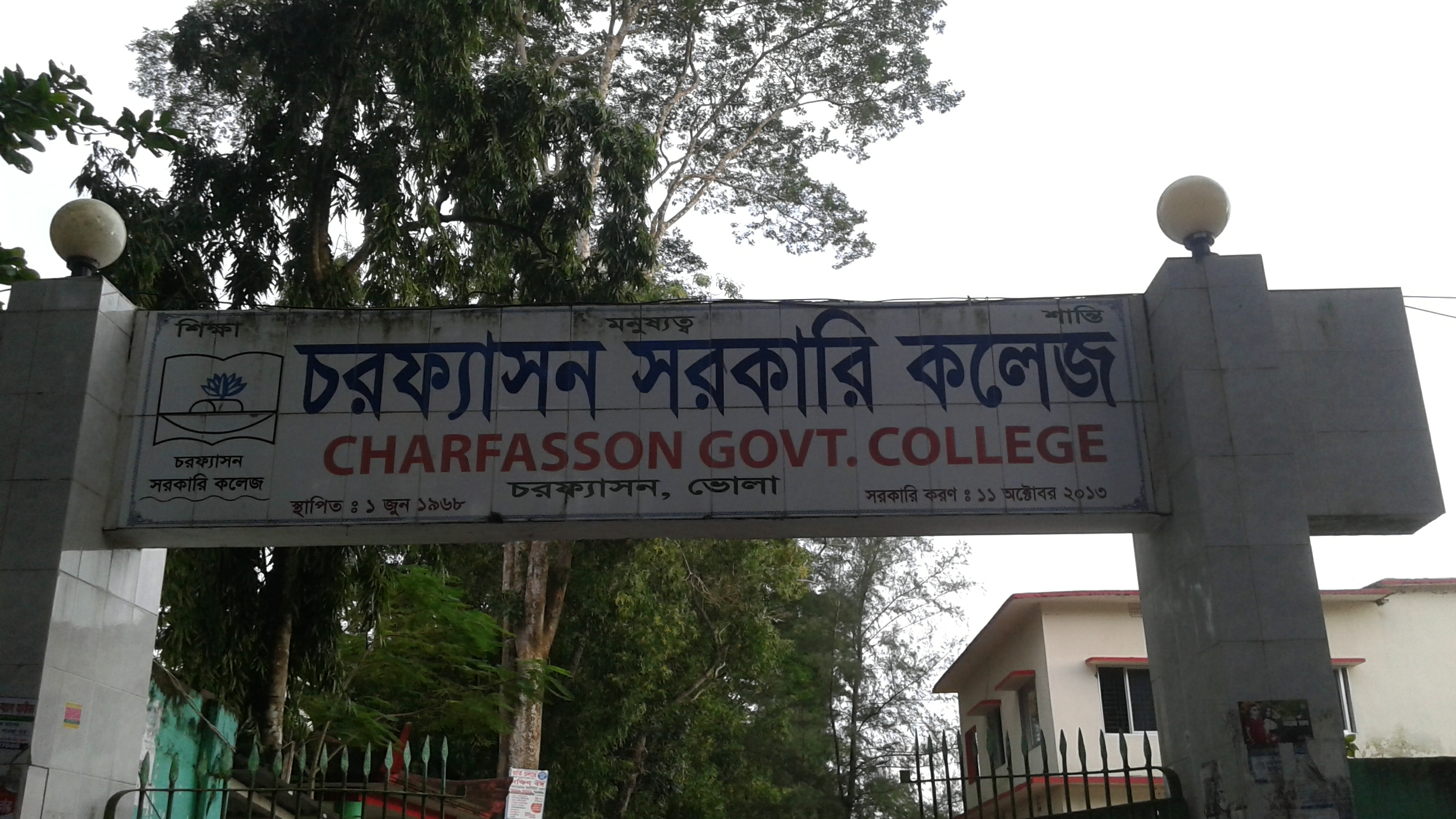
- প্রধান প্রবেশ পথ

Location
- On the side of Principal Nazrul Islam Road, 1970 feet west of Bhola Char Fasson Road; Char Fasson, Bhola 8340; Bangladesh; 22°11′19.518″N 90°45′12.928″E

Information
- School type: Govt. College
- Motto: Education-Humanity Peace (শিক্ষা-মনুষ্যত্ব শান্তি)
- Established: 1968
- School district: Bhola
- Principal: Professor Mohammad Ullah
- Staff: 20
- Faculty: 05
- Teaching staff: 63
- Language: Bangla
- Campus size: 13.20 acres (5.34 ha)
- Campus type: Urban
- Sports: Football, cricket
- Publication: Polimatir Kotha (published 2014)
- Affiliation: Bangladesh National University, Barisal Education Board
- Board of Education: Board of Intermediate and Secondary Education, Barisal
- Affiliation: National University
- EIIN: 101439
- Website: charfassongovtcollege.edu.bd

Char Fasson Government College is a government educational institution. It is one of the colleges in Bhola. Established in 1968, the college is one of the oldest schools in Bhola district and one of the best in South Bengal. In this college higher secondary and undergraduate level educational activities are conducted. The college is surrounded by a beautiful and captivating natural environment. This college is affiliated to Bangladesh National University and Barisal Education Board.

== History of establishment ==
The name comes from its location, Char Fasson, a coastal town of Bhola.

In the late fifties, an initiative was taken to set up a Char Fasson College under the leadership of A. Haq Master, the headmaster of Charfashion Govt. T. Baret Secondary School. According to him, the entrepreneurs submitted an application to the then sub-divisional administrator MA Aziz to set up Char Fassson College. Until then Bhola College was not established. Then the sub-divisional administrator said, when there is no college in Bhola, Char Fasson is a union, how can a college be established there! AH Haque Master told him to come and establish a college here. In 1982, he became the founding principal of Bhola Government College. Then the establishment of Char Fasson College was somewhat hampered, but did not stop.

On 1 June 1986, dignitaries of the time, market traders, social workers and people's representatives all gathered at the Brajgopal Public Club. The meeting, chaired by Abdul Motaleb Master, a prominent person of the area, took a formal decision to establish Char Fasson College. A 143-member organizing committee was formed. Founder President of the College Committee, Sub-Divisional Administrator, Secretary Abdul Matin, Joint Secretary Fazlur Rahman Faraji, Treasurer Md. Samsuddin Master. At the first day's meeting, the treasurer paid ten thousand TK in cash. The then eminent person Char Fasson TB High School headmaster M. M. Nazrul Islam appointed, the head of Char Fasson TB School, as the principal of Char Fasson College. On August 1, 1986, he joined Char Fasson College as the principal. The first activities of the college started at Brajgopal Public Club.

On 11 June 2013, the Prime Minister's Office sent a letter of consent from the prime minister to the Ministry of Education. The inspection team formed by the Department of Secondary Higher Education to make the college a government college visited on 23 June 2013. On 22 July 2013, the Ministry of Education sent a letter of Deed of Gift for the transfer of all movable and immovable property to the Government, including the ban on transfer of immovable property and promotion of the college for government purposes.

According to the decision of the meeting of the Governing Body dated 2 August 2013, the Deed of Gift was executed on behalf of Char Fasson College on behalf of the Principal along with His Excellency the President in the document No. 365 dated 14 August 2013. Then on 22 October 2013, the Ministry of Education issued a memorandum No. 9 / S.K.-18/2013/518 to the Charfason College from 11 October 2013. Charfasson Government College was made official and was registered in the Bangladesh Gazette on 31 October 2013.

== Establishment of examination center ==
The secondary examination centre was established in 1982 and in 1989 degree examination centre was Established. In 2013 honours testing Centre was also established.

== Faculties and departments ==
Bachelor's Degree Honours Courses:

- Department of Political Science
- Department of Social Work
- Department of History
- Department of Management
- Department of Accounting
- Department of Arts
- Department of Science
- Department of Business Education

Bachelor Degree (Pass) Courses:

- B. A. (Pass)
- B. S. S. (Pass)
- B. Sc. (Pass)
- B. B. S. (Pass)
