= Bir Sreshtho Mostafa Kamal Memorial Museum and Library =

Coordinates: 22.6600°N 90.6321°E

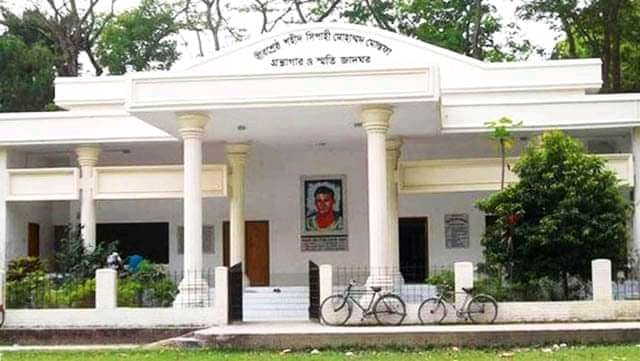
Bir Sreshtho Mostafa Kamal Memorial Museum

The Bir Sreshtho Mohammad Mostafa Kamal Memorial Museum and Library was established in early 2008 in memory of the national hero.

== Location ==
The Bir Sreshtho Mostafa Kamal Memorial Museum and Library is located at Mostafa Nagar in Alinegar Union, about seven kilometers away from Bhola town.

== History ==
As part of a project to build museums and libraries at the birthplaces of seven national heroes and three language martyrs, the Bir Sreshtho Sipahi Mohammad Mostafa Kamal Library and Memorial Museum was constructed on 3 May 2008 at a cost of 5.7 million Bangladeshi taka. It was built to spread the history of the Liberation War and the heroism of the Bir Sreshthos among future generations.

== Description ==
The museum preserves memorabilia and books that help the new generation learn about the history of the Liberation War. The library has separate shelves for different subjects, each labeled by topic to make it easy to find the desired book. The collection includes biographies, novels, religious books, works on science and information technology, writings on the Bangladesh Liberation War, general knowledge, children's literature, poetry collections, and more. In addition to books, the large auditorium features small reading tables. On one side of the arranged books are displayed personal items and photographs of the Bir Sreshtho. The library also offers access to daily national newspapers.

== Schedule ==
Except on public holidays, the museum remains open to visitors every day from 10 a.m. to 4 p.m.
