= Borhanuddin Zamindar Bari =

- Alternative names: Chowdhury Bari

General information
- Type: Residential house
- Location: Borhanuddin Upazila, Bhola District, Bangladesh
- Opening: c. 1950
- Owner: Borhan Uddin Chowdhury

Technical details
- Material: Brick, surki, and rod
- Floor count: 2

Borhanuddin Zamindar Bari is a historic Zamindar house located in Sachra Union of Borhanuddin Upazila in Bhola District, Bangladesh.

== History ==
The zamindar house was established about one and a half centuries ago. It was founded by Zamindar Borhan Uddin Chowdhury. He was a prominent zamindar of his time. The Borhanuddin Upazila of Bhola District was later named after him by the British authorities. His zamindari included about 27 mouzas, along with thousands of acres of property across parts of Bhola and Barisal. The zamindars undertook various development works within their estates. Before his death, Zamindar Borhan Uddin Chowdhury donated large portions of land for social development and mosque construction. However, most of these lands are now under public possession. He passed away on 21 Boishakh, 1419 Bengali year.

== Architecture ==
A two-storied residential building and three additional structures, known as kachari ghars (administrative houses), were built for zamindari affairs, trials, and accommodation of guests. A mosque was also built at the entrance of the estate.

== Present condition ==
Due to negligence and lack of maintenance, much of the heritage of the zamindar house is now on the verge of destruction. Only the mosque remains in relatively good condition because it is still in use.
