= Bhuiyan Iqbal =

Bangladeshi writer (1946–2021)

Bhuiya Iqbal
- Born: November 22, 1946; Bhola
- Died: 22 July 2021 (aged 74)
- Citizenship: Bangladeshi
- Known for: Bangla Academy Literary Award (2014)
- Spouse: Laila Zaman
- Children: Anindya Iqbal(m. Tishna Sabrina), Ashesh Iqbal(m. Jaohar Nusrat Bina)

Bhuiyan Iqbal (22 November 1946 – 22 July 2021) was a Bangladeshi writer. He received the Bangla Academy Literary Award in 2014 in the "Research" category.

== Early life ==
Bhuiyan Iqbal was born on 22 November 1946 in Bhola. He studied at Siddheshwari and West End schools, and later at Dhaka College. He completed his BA and MA in Bengali from the University of Dhaka, and earned a PhD from the University of Calcutta in 1984.

== Career ==
Bhuiyan Iqbal started his career at the then Dainik Pakistan newspaper. In 1973, he joined the Department of Bengali at the University of Chittagong as a professor and retired in 2013.

== Bibliography ==
=== Published books ===
- Abul Kalam Shamsuddin
- Anwar Pasha
- Buddhadeb Bosu
- Shashankmohon Sen
- (Sir) Azizul Haque
- Social images in the novels of Bangladesh
- A bunch of letters by Rabindranath

=== Rabindranath ===
- His Letters
- Letters to Him
- Rabindra Reception in Bangladesh

==== Edited works ====
- Manik Bandopadhyay

=== Selected writings ===
- Abdul Karim Sahityabisharad
- From Solitude to Crowd

== Awards ==
- Bangla Academy Literary Award (2014)
- Humayun Kabir Memorial Award
