= Char Fashion Municipality =

Local governing body of Char Fasson Municipality, Bangladesh

Char Fasson Municipality চর ফ্যাশন পৌরসভা
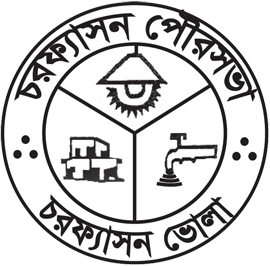
- Emblem of the Char Fasson Municipality

Type
- Type: Municipality

History
- Founded: 1990; 36 years ago

Leadership
- Mayor: Vacant
- Administrator: Rasna Sharmin Mithi since 17 November 2024
- Deputy Mayor: Vacant since 19 August 2024

Structure
- Seats: Vacant seats 9 councillors
- Length of term: Up to five years

Elections
- Voting system: First past the post
- Next election: TBD

Meeting place
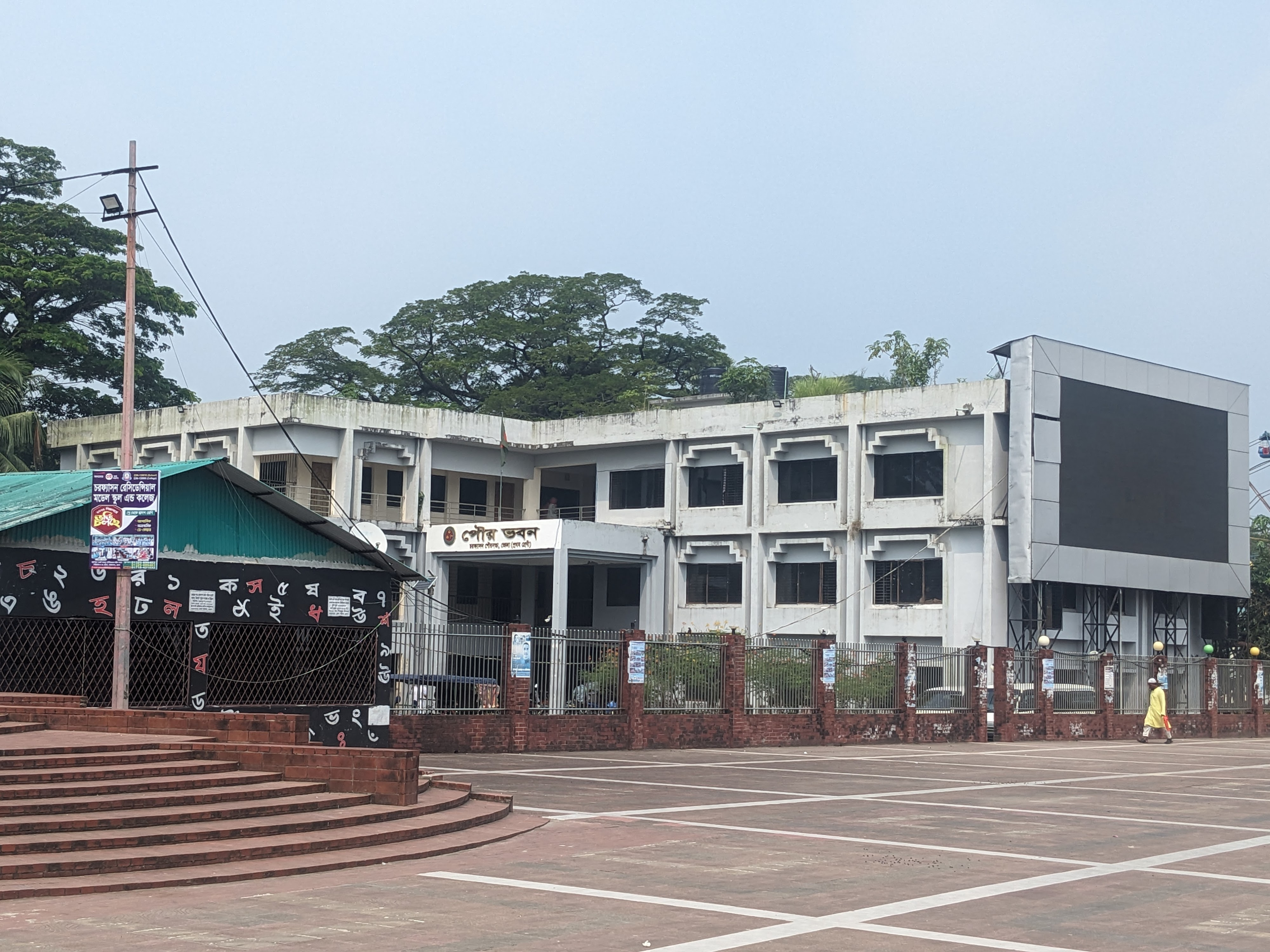
- Char Fashion Municipality, Bhola

Website
- charfesson.bhola.gov.bd/bn/site/page/%E0%A6%AE%E0%A7%87%E0%A7%9F%E0%A6%B0

Char Fashion Municipality চর ফ্যাশন পৌরসভা
- Town and Municipality
- Location in Bangladesh
- Coordinates: 22°11′10″N 90°45′35″E
- Country: Bangladesh
- Division: Barisal Division
- District: Bhola District
- Upazila: Char Fasson Upazila

Government
  - Type: Municipality
  - Body: Char Fasson Municipality

Area
  - Total: 31.7 km^{2} (12.2 sq mi)

Population (2011)
  - Total: 42,915
  - Density: 1,350/km^{2} (3,510/sq mi)
- Time zone: UTC+6 (BST)

Char Fashion Municipality (Bengali: চর ফ্যাশন পৌরসভা) is a town and municipality in Bhola District in Barisal Division, Bangladesh. It is the administrative headquarters and urban center of Char Fasson Upazila. It functions as the commercial and service center for Char Fasson Upazila. The municipality covers an area of approximately 31.7 km² and had a population of 42,915 at the 2011 census.

== Administration ==
The municipality is divided into **9 wards** and **9 mahallas**. It is administered by a Mayor and a council elected by the residents.

== Geography and climate ==
Char Fashion Municipality lies on Bhola Island in the lower Meghna delta, close to the Bay of Bengal. Because of its coastal and island-adjacent setting, the area is vulnerable to tropical cyclones, tidal surges, and salinity intrusion. Infrastructure such as roads and drainage is often challenged by heavy monsoon rainfall and river erosion.

== Infrastructure and services ==
=== Roads and transport ===
Roads in the area are reported to be in poor condition. For example, some local reports note about 90 km of municipal and connecting roads showing serious potholes and waterlogging.

=== Waste management ===
In March 2025, municipal authorities were criticized for dumping household and clinical waste along the Bhola-Char Fasson regional highway, which had become a health and environmental hazard for commuters.

== Demographics ==
According to the 2022 updated population data for the town area, the urban population is 41,562, comprising 21,226 males, 20,316 females, and 20 hijras. The religious composition is 38,265 Muslims and 3,265 Hindus.

== Economy and livelihood ==
The local economy is largely based on agriculture, fishing, small-scale trade, and fisheries-related services. Being an island town, Bhola-Char Fasson serves as a transit and market hub for surrounding char (river-island) communities.

== Education and culture ==
The municipality hosts a number of secondary schools, colleges and madrasa institutions serving the wider Char Fasson Upazila.

- Charfashion Govt. T. Barret Model Secondary School
- Charfasson Government College

== Issues and challenges ==
Because of its coastal setting and limited infrastructure, the municipality faces recurring challenges:

- Frequent road damage and waterlogging after heavy rains or tides
- Inadequate waste disposal services and environmental health concerns
- Power supply and street-lighting problems reported by residents (e.g., broken street lights leading to increased safety risks)

== See also ==
- Char Fasson Upazila
- Municipalities of Bangladesh
