= Tazumuddin Upazila =

Tazumuddin তজমুদ্দিন
- Upazila
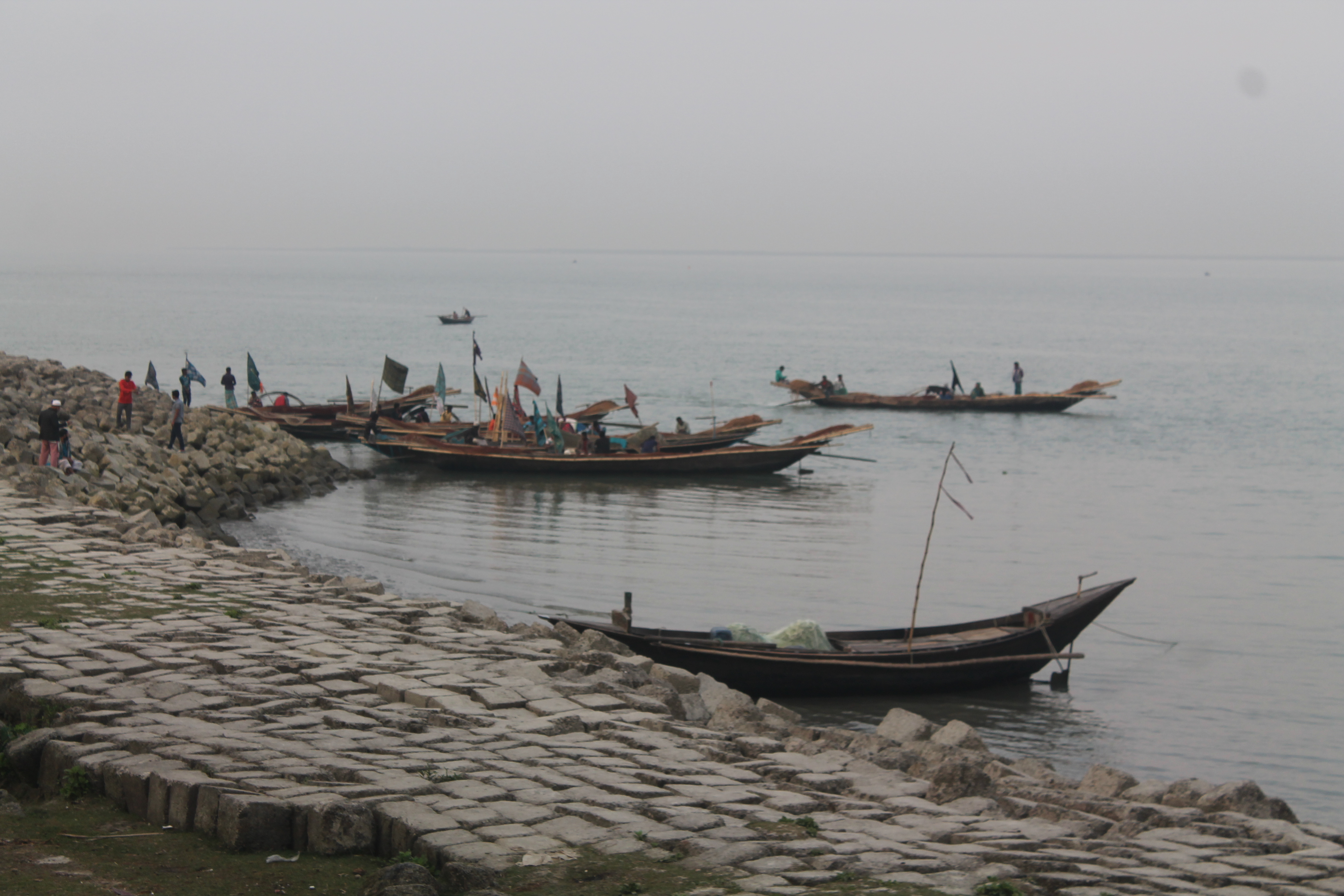
- Meghna River at Tazumuddin upazila

- Coordinates: 22°25′N 90°50.9′E
- Country: Bangladesh
- Division: Barisal Division
- District: Bhola District

Area
  - Total: 512.91 km^{2} (198.04 sq mi)

Population (2022)
  - Total: 134,176
  - Density: 261.60/km^{2} (677.53/sq mi)
- Time zone: UTC+6 (BST)
- Postal code: 8350
- Website: http://tazumuddin.bhola.gov.bd

Tazumuddin (Bengali: তজমুদ্দিন) is an upazila of Bhola District in the Division of Barisal, Bangladesh.

== Geography ==
Tazumuddin is located at 22.4167°N 90.8486°E. It has a total area of 512.92 km^{2}. It is bounded by Daulatkhan upazila on the north, Lalmohan, Manpura upazilas and Meghna river on the south, Hatiya and Ramgati upazilas and Meghna river on the east, Burhanuddin upazila on the west.

== Demographics ==
Religions in Tazumuddin Upazila (2022)
Religion	Percent
Islam	95.09%
Hinduism	4.90%
Other or not stated	0.01%

According to the 2022 Bangladeshi census, Tazumuddin Upazila had 32,441 households and a population of 134,176. 11.48% of the population were under 5 years of age. Tazumuddin had a literacy rate (age 7 and over) of 62.43%: 61.93% for males and 62.93% for females, and a sex ratio of 99.41 males for every 100 females. 57,638 (42.96%) lived in urban areas.

As of the 2011 Census of Bangladesh, Tazumuddin has a population of 126,940 living in 28,734 households. 33,274 (26.21%) were under 10 years of age. Tazumuddin has an average literacy rate of 42.90% (7+ years) and a sex ratio of 949 females per 1000 males. 20,941 (16.50%) of the population lives in urban areas.

Par the 2001 Bangladesh census, Tazumuddin had a population of 120,189; males constituted 63,576, females 56,613; Muslim 109,063, Hindu 11,086, Buddhist 11, Christian 20 and others 9.

According to the 1991 Bangladesh census, the upazila had a population of 116,822, living in 20,444 households. Males constituted 51.94% of the population, and females 48.06%. The population aged 18 or over was 51,881. Tazumuddin had an average literacy rate of 27% (ages seven years and up), against the national average of 32.4%.

== Administration ==
Tazumuddin Thana was formed on 28 August 1928 and it was turned into an upazila on 14 March 1983.

The Upazila is divided into five union parishads: Baro Molongchora, Chanchra, Chadpur, Shambupur, and Sonapur. The union parishads are subdivided into 36 mauzas and 75 villages.

== See also ==
- Upazilas of Bangladesh
- Districts of Bangladesh
- Divisions of Bangladesh
