= Char Kukri-Mukri Wildlife Sanctuary =

Wildlife sanctuary in Bangladesh

- IUCN category IV (habitat/species management area)
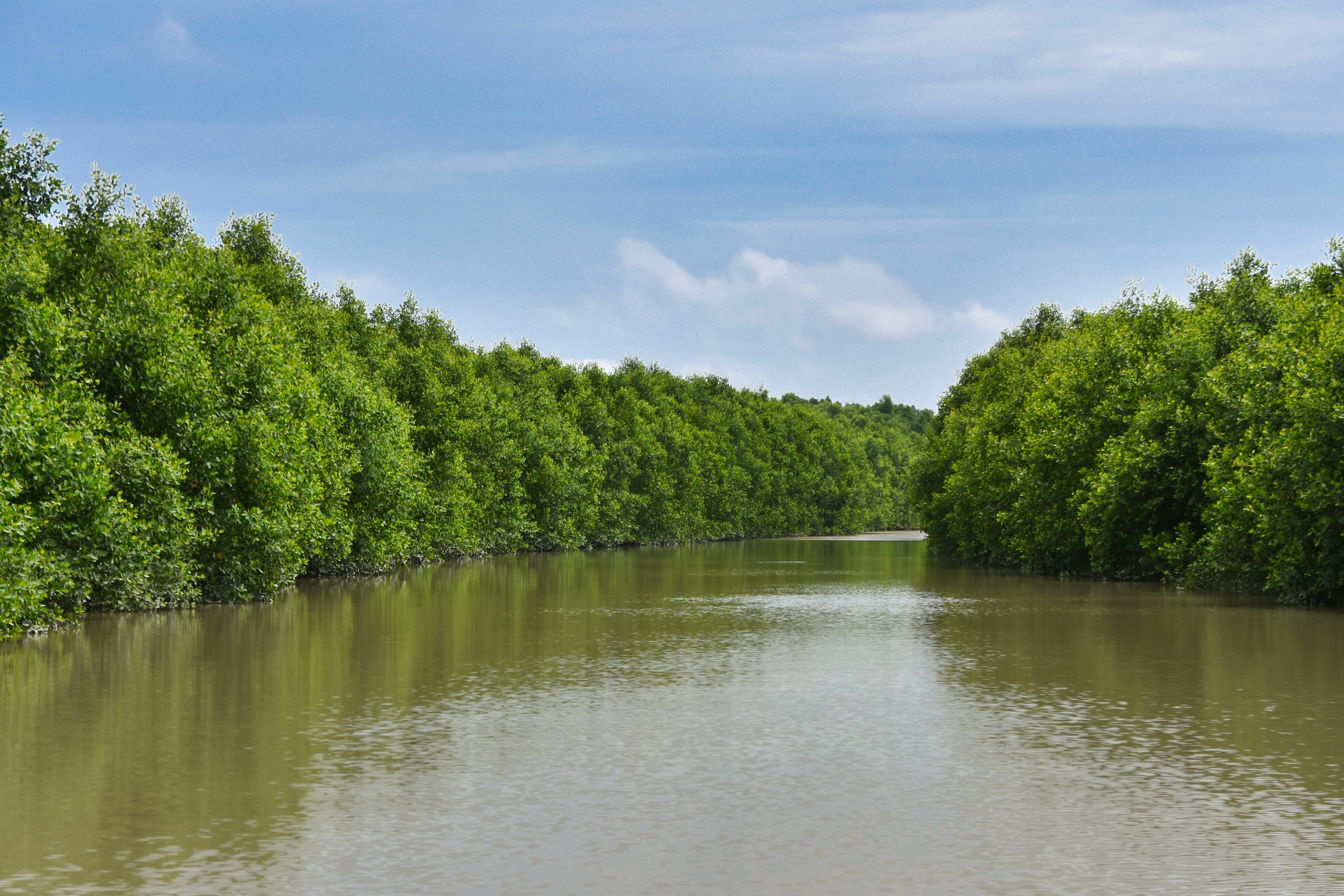
- Mangroves in the sanctuary

- Location within Barisal division Location within Bangladesh
- Location: Bhola District, Barisal Division, Bangladesh
- Nearest city: Bhola
- Coordinates: 21°55′32.1″N 90°38′49.4″E
- Area: 40 ha (99 acres)
- Established: 19 December 1981

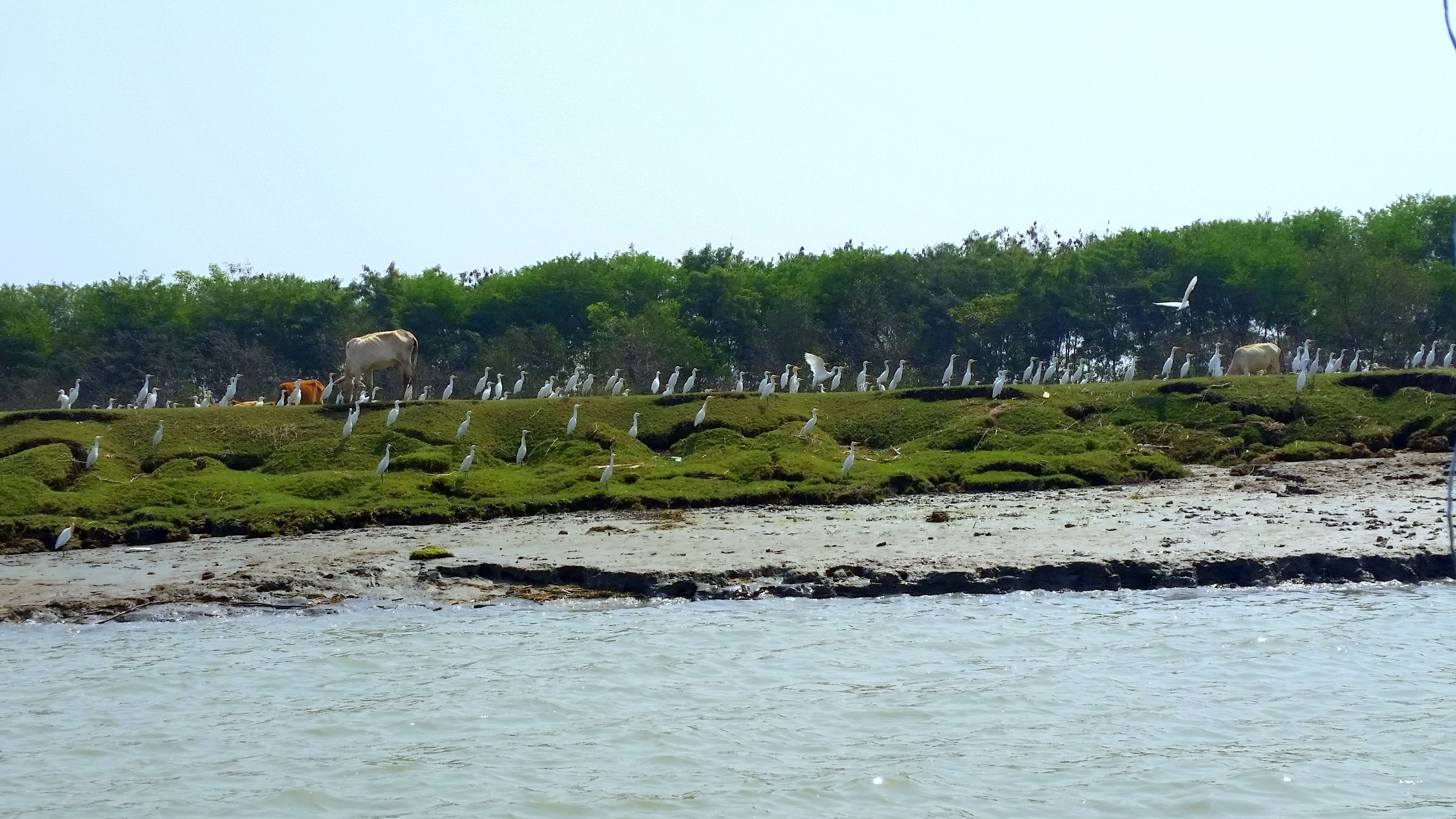
Char Kukri-Mukri Wildlife Sanctuary

Char Kukri-Mukri Wildlife Sanctuary (Bengali: চর কুকরি মুকরি বন্যপ্রানী সংরক্ষণ অভয়ারন্য) is a wildlife sanctuary in southern Charfession Upazila of Bangladesh, located on Char Kukri Mukri island in the Bay of Bengal. The area of the sanctuary is 40 ha (99 acres), and is elongated in shape. It is 130 km from Barisal town in the gangetic delta on the mouth of Meghna river. It is also called Charfasson wildlife sanctuary. Most part of the sanctuary is submerged twice in a day due to high tide and is covered with dense mangrove vegetation. The soil type is clay.

== Climate ==
The rainfall is very high during the monsoon season, the recorded rainfall is 2,790 mm (110 in) round the year. The climate is hot and humid round the year. The sanctuary is dissected by 6 small Khals or creeks.

== History ==
According to the local people the human habitation started on the island around 1930 during the British Raj. The Bhola cyclone which hit the Bangladesh in 1970 had swept the entire human population on the island. After the cyclone, in the year 1973/1974 people again migrated to the island and started fishing and cultivation. Bangladesh forest department started afforestation of many mangrove species on the island.

== Management ==
The park is managed by 1 Range officer and 1 forest beat guard. It is administered by the Coastal Forest Division at Bhola. It was declared as wildlife sanctuary on 19-12-1981 under the Bangladesh wildlife (Preservation) Amendment Act of 1947. No forestry activities is carried out in the mangrove forest except conservation activities.

== Flora and fauna ==
The sanctuary has an estuarine ecosystem; the sanctuary is covered with mangrove forest on the major part with intermittent open mudflats.

=== Flora ===
Char Kukri-Mukri mangrove ecosystem reveals the occurrence of 383 species belonging to 264 genera under 85 families of vascular plants, of which 48 species are mangroves and mangrove associates, and the rest of the 335 species are non-mangroves. The major plant groups, viz., pteridophytes are represented by 11 species under 10 genera and six families; gymnosperms by two species under two genera and two families; magnoliopsida (dicotyledonous) by 278 species belonging to 194 genera and 60 families; and liliopsida by the rest of the 92 species under 59 genera and 17 families. Fabaceae is the largest dicot family with 43 species, and Poaceae with 30 species is recorded as the largest monocot family. Among the life-form categories, 198 (51.7%) species are recorded as herbs, followed by 98 (25.59%), 45 (11.75%), and 42 (10.97%) species those are recognized as trees, shrubs, and climbers, respectively. The Mangrove species like Keora (Sonneratia apetala), Soilla (Sonneratia caseolaris), Baine (Avicennia officinalis), Gewa (Excoecaria agallocha), Hargoja (Acanthus ilicifolius), Golpata (Nypa fruticans) etc. are common.

=== Fauna ===
Common mammals include Fishing cat (Felis viverrina) and Oriental small-clawed otter (Aonyx cinerea). Water fowl species of Bitterns, Herons, Egrets, kingfishers are very common. Eight species of Herons breed in the sanctuary. The Grey Pelican or Spot-billed pelican which is included in the Near threatened species list of IUCN Red data Book is also found in this sanctuary. All three species of Monitor lizard namely (Varanus salvator), Bengal monitor (Varanus bengalensis) and Yellow monitor (Varanus flavescens) are also found in the sanctuary.

== Threats ==
This productive and protective ecosystem is gradually degraded due to perturbation caused by multifarious anthropogenic activities, such as- habitat destruction, deforestation, overexploitation of forest resources, timber and firewood collection, over grassing, infrastructure development, introduction of invasive plant species, unplanned tourism, pollution, as well as the frequent occurrence of natural disasters like cyclones, tidal surges, and tropical storms, river bank erosion by tidal waves, etc. are recognized as the severe threats for this mangrove ecosystem. In addition to the lack of proper management and public awareness are the critical threats for the flora and habitats of the mangrove ecosystems of the Char Kukri Mukri Island.

== See also ==
- List of protected areas of Bangladesh
