= Char Nizam =

Island in Bhola district, Bangladesh

- Island
- Interactive map of Char Nizam
- Coordinates: 21.900°N 90.801°E
- Country: Bangladesh
- Division: Barishal Division
- District: Bhola District
- Time zone: UTC+6 (BST)

Char Nizam, also known as Char Nizam Kalkini, is a remote island in the Meghna river delta in the Bhola district of Bangladesh.

Char Nizam is home to 250 families.

== History ==
Char Nizam was discovered in the mid 1980s and was soon after settled by people.
