= Bhola District =

Bhola District ভোলা জেলা
- District of Bangladesh
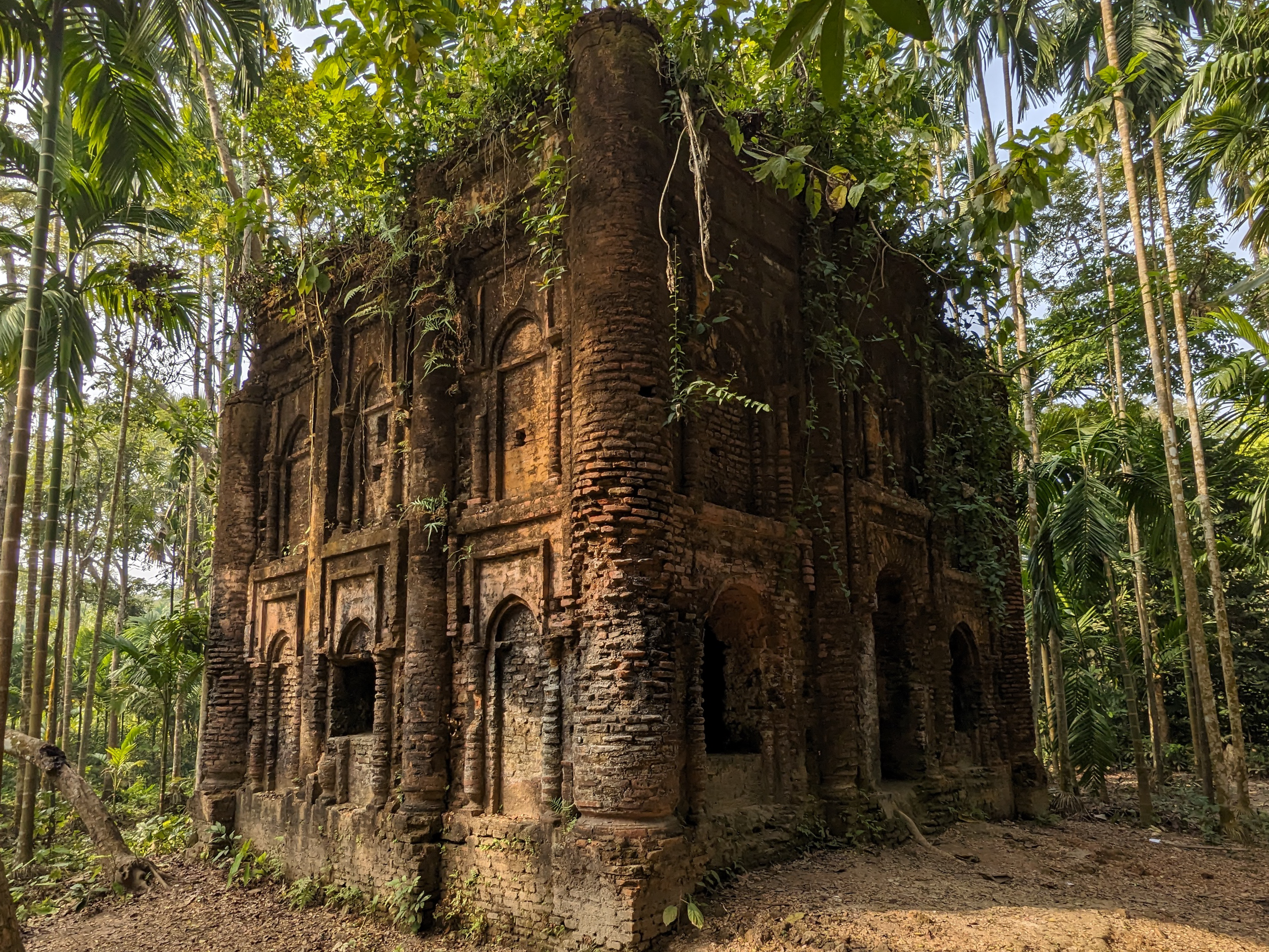
- Mughal-era mosque in South Dighaldi, Bhola Sadar
- Interactive map of Bhola District
- Coordinates: 22.69°N 90.6525°E
- Country: Bangladesh
- Division: Barisal Division
- Established: 1984
- Headquarters: Bhola

Area
  - Total: 3,403.48 km^{2} (1,314.09 sq mi)

Population (2022)
  - Total: 1,932,518
  - Density: 567.806/km^{2} (1,470.61/sq mi)
  - Male: 946,629
  - Female: 985,815
- Demonym: Bholaiya
- Time zone: UTC+06:00 (BST)
- Postal code: 8300
- Area code: 0491
- ISO 3166 code: BD-07
- HDI (2018): 0.586 medium · 16th of 21
- Website: www.bhola.gov.bd

Bhola District (Bengali: ভোলা জেলা) is an administrative district of Barisal Division in south-central Bangladesh, which includes Bhola Island, the largest island of Bangladesh. It has an area of 3,403.48 km^{2}. It is bounded by Lakshmipur and Barisal District to the north, the Bay of Bengal to the south, by Lakshmipur and Noakhali districts, the (lower) Meghna river and Shahbazpur Channel to the east, and by Patuakhali District and the Tentulia river to the west.

The district is intersected by several rivers, among which the Ilisha River plays a vital role in shaping the local geography and livelihoods. Flowing as a distributary of the Meghna River, the Ilisha River runs through the western part of Bhola before merging with the Tentulia river and eventually draining into the Bay of Bengal. Along its course, the river forms part of the natural boundary that separates Bhola Island and contributes to the sedimentation that sustains the island’s landmass. However, the Ilisha River is also a major source of erosion, threatening settlements and agricultural land in its path, particularly in areas like Mehendiganj and Rajapur Union.

Bhola is also known as the Home of Ilish, and rivers like the Ilisha provide crucial habitat for the iconic hilsa fish that the district is famous for.

== History ==
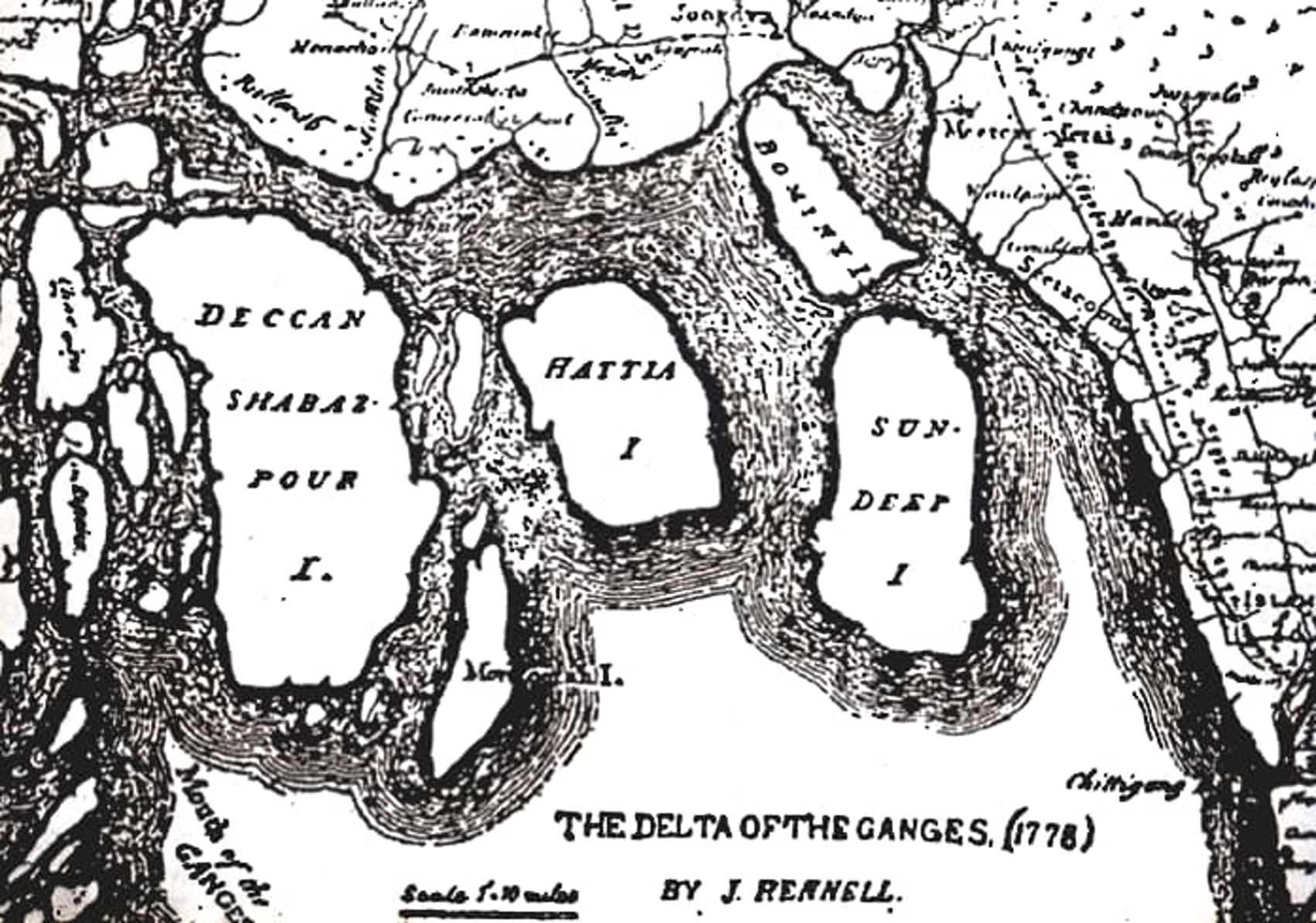
South Shahbajpur Island ( marked as DECCAN SHABAZPOUR l.) which is now Bhola in 1778 map by James Rennell

The previous name of Bhola district is Ashutosh. J. C. Jack stated in his "Bakerganj Gazetier" that the island started creating in 1235 and cultivation in this area started in 1300. In 1500, Portuguese and Mog pirates established their bases on this island. The Arakan and Mog pirates established their bases in the southern part of Shahbajpur also.

Shahbajpur was a part of Bakerganj district till 1822. At the beginning of 19th century, it became difficult to connect to the southern Shahjadpur from the district headquarter due to the expansion of Meghna River. Government then decided to include south Shahbajpur and Hatia in Noakhali District. Bhola was included in Noakhali till 1869. In 1869, it was included again in Barisal District as a sub-division. In 1876, the administrative headquarter was moved from Daulatkhan to Bhola. In 1984, it was established as a district.

== Etymology ==
The canal situated in the Bhola Sadar was very wide in ancient times. The canal was known as Betua river. People used boat to cross the river. There was a very old boatman who used to cross the river daily. His name was Bhola Ghazi Patni. The name of the district is derived from the name of this famous boatman, Bhola Ghazi. The other sub-districts of this districts are also named according to the names of famous persons as well.

== Geography ==
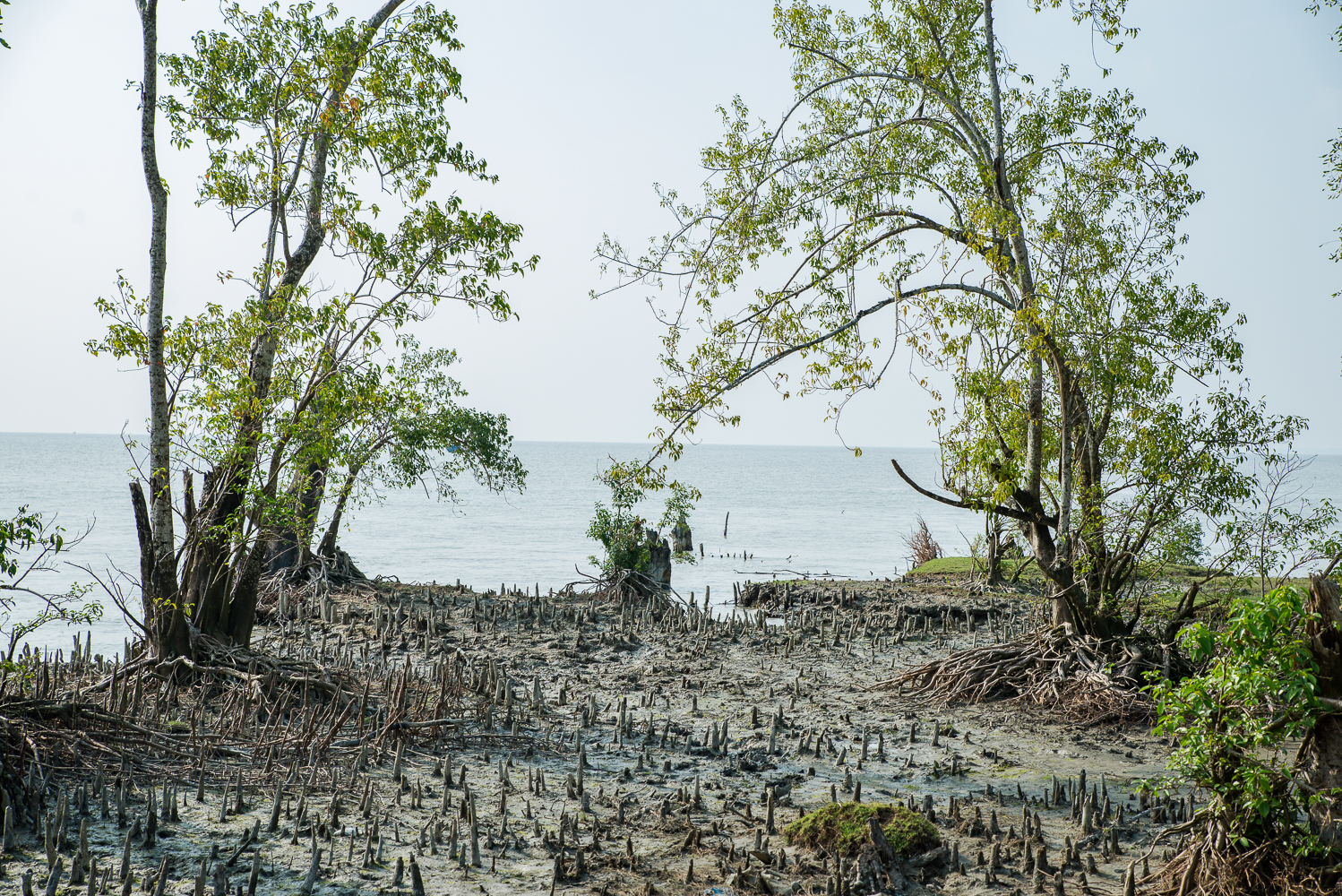
Mangroves in Char Kukri-Mukri Wildlife Sanctuary.

Bhola is a delta island. There are two rivers in this district which are Meghna and Tetulia. Meghna is in east and north side of the district and Tetulia is in the west side. Bay of Bengal is in the south of Bhola district.

=== Islands ===
- Bhola Island
- Manpura Island
- Dhal Char
- Char Kukri Mukri
- Char Nizam
- Char Jahiruddin
- Char Nazeur Rahaman

== Administration ==
Bhola District upazila geocode map

There are five municipalities, 7 sub-districts, 10 thanas, 70 unions and 473 villages in this district.

=== Subdistricts ===
Bhola district comprises the following upazilas:

Name of Sub-district	Union	Area (km^{2})	Population (2022)
Bhola Sadar Upazila	13	413.16	444,828
Daulatkhan Upazila	9	316.99	181,809
Burhanuddin Upazila	9	284.67	265,430
Tazumuddin Upazila	5	512.92	134,173
Lalmohan Upazila	9	396.24	297,669
Char Fasson Upazila	21	1106.31	518,792
Manpura Upazila	3	373.19	89,743

== Demographics ==
Historical population
Year	Pop.	±% p.a.
1974	959,768	—
1981	1,170,262	+2.87%
1991	1,476,328	+2.35%
2001	1,703,117	+1.44%
2011	1,776,795	+0.42%
2022	1,932,518	+0.77%

According to the 2022 Census of Bangladesh, Bhola District had 449,057 households and a population of 1,932,518 with an average 4.27 people per household. Among the population, 427,671 (22.13%) inhabitants were under 10 years of age. The population density was 568 people per km^{2}. Bhola District had a literacy rate (age 7 and over) of 67.30%, compared to the national average of 74.80%, and a sex ratio of 1041 females per 1000 males. Approximately, 27.65% of the population lived in urban areas. The ethnic population was 773.

Religions in Bhola District (2022)
Religion	Percent
Islam	97.11%
Hindus	2.87%
Other or not stated	0.02%

Religion in present-day Bhola district
Religion	1941 (Note: Bhola subdivision of erstwhile Bakerganj district)		1981		1991		2001		2011		2022	
Religion	Pop.	%	Pop.	%	Pop.	%	Pop.	%	Pop.	%	Pop.	%
Islam	463,403	86.44%	1,077,569	92.08%	1,379,188	93.42%	1,630,460	95.73%	1,715,497	96.55%	1,876,758	97.11%
Hinduism	72,638	13.55%	91,964	7.86%	96,005	6.50%	72,275	4.24%	61,162	3.44%	55,535	2.87%
Others (Note: Including Jainism, Christianity, Buddhism, Zoroastrianism, Judaism, Ad-Dharmis, or not stated)	76	0.01%	729	0.06%	1,135	0.08%	382	0.03%	136	0.01%	225	0.02%
Total Population	536,117	100%	1,170,262	100%	1,476,328	100%	1,703,117	100%	1,776,795	100%	1,932,518	100%

The majority of residents are Muslims and there are 2391 mosques, 130 temples and 14 church in this district. The Hindu population has been decreased significantly in this district since 1991.

== Economy ==
80% of the total people living here are fisherman. Main source of income of this district are: Agriculture 63.64%, non-agricultural labourer 4.95%, industry 0.50%, commerce 12.67%, transport and communication 2.47%, service 5.74%, construction 1.55%, religious service 0.35%, rent and remittance 0.44% and others 7.69%. There is no major industry in this district due to its geographical location. In recent times, small factories like shoe, plastics, wax, tar etc. have been established here.

== Education ==
The literacy rate of Bhola district is 67.12% (according to bangladesh.gov.bd). The literacy rate among the male population is 67.03% and the female population is 67.20%. There are 3 government and 34 non-government colleges, 6 government and 174 non-government high schools, 84 junior high schools, one PTI, one VTI, 9 technical schools, 922 government primary schools, and 32 community primary schools in Bhola. There are 103 Kowmi madrasa, 460 ebtedai madrasa, 171 dakhil madrasa, 28 alim madrasa, 29 fazil madrasa and 5 kamil madrasa in Bhola. Notable schools and colleges are:

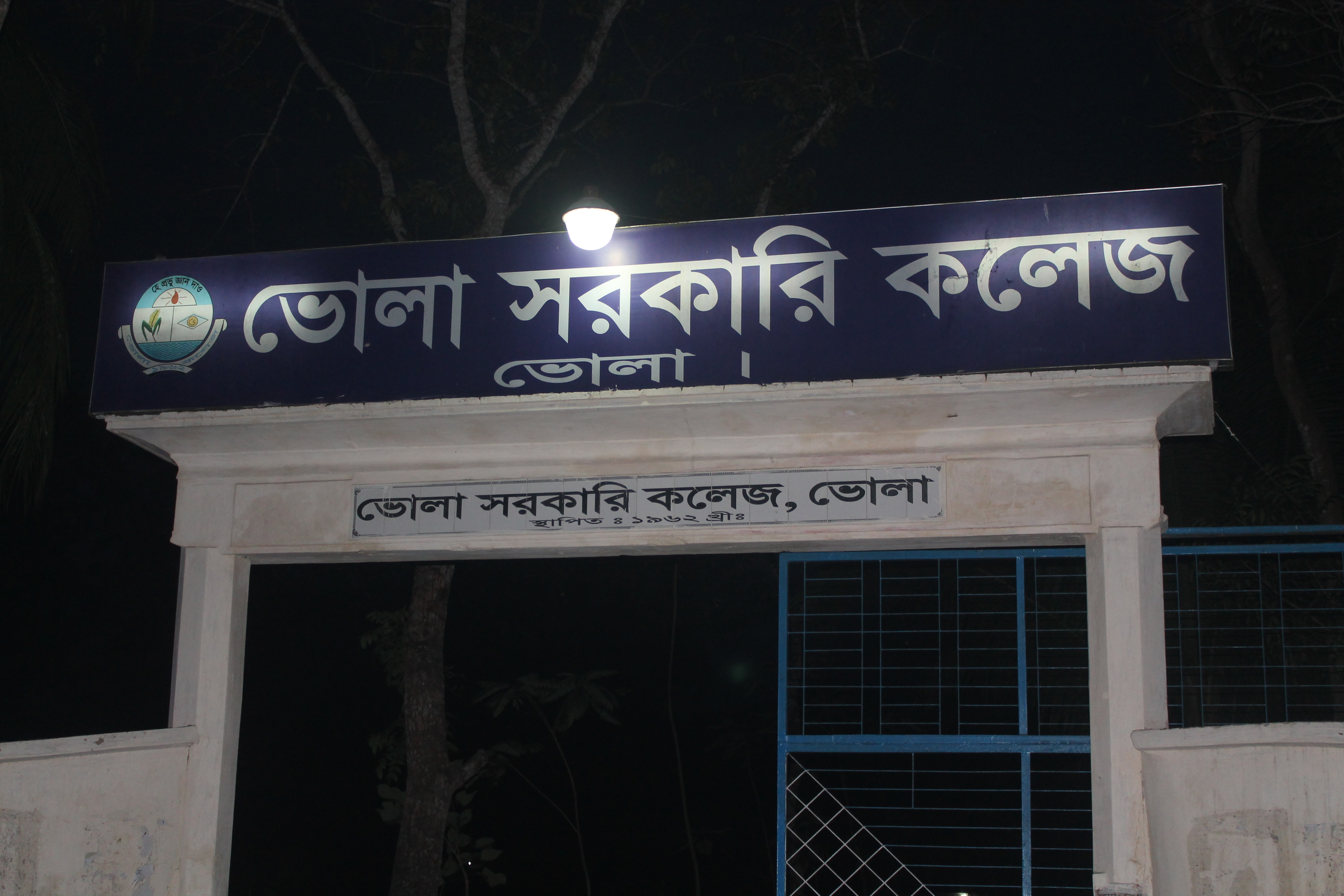
Bhola Government College main gate

=== Government Colleges (National University) ===
- Bhola Govt. College
- Charfasson Govt. College
- Daulatkhan Govt. Abu Abdullah College
- Bhola Govt. Mohila College
- Govt. Abdul Jabbar College, Borhanuddin
- Shahabajpur Govt. College
- Monpura Govt. College
- Tazumuddin Govt College

=== Colleges ===
- Fatema Motin Mohila College
- Begum Rahima Islam College
- Rasulpur Degree College
- Daulatkhan Mohila College
- Banglabazar Degree College
- Principal Nazrul Islam Degree College
- Dular Hat Adarsha Degree College
- South AICHA Principal Nazrul Islam College

=== Textile Institute ===
- Bhola Textile Institute, Bhola, for Diploma in Engineering under BTEB

=== Polytechnics & Technical Institute ===
- Bhola Polytechnic Institute
- Bhola Textile Institute
- Bhola Government Technical School & College
- Technical Training Center, Bhola
- Dokkhin Bongo Technical Institute
- Bhola Sadar Polytechnic Institute
- HEED Polytechnic Institute
- Charfassion Polytechnic Institute

=== Government High School ===
- Charfashion Govt. T. Barret Model Secondary School
- Bhola Govt. High School
- Bhola Govt. Girls High School
- Daulatkhan Govt. High School
- Daulatkhan Govt. Girls High School
- Lalmohan Govt. Model Secondary School
- Fazilatunnesa Govt. Girls High School
- Chandpur Govt. High School
- Borhanuddin Govt. High School
- Borhanuddin Govt. Girls High School
- Hazir Hat Model Govt. Secondary School

=== Private High School ===
- Charfashion Girls Secondary School
- Charfassion Town Secondary School
- Charfassion Model Secondary School
- Lalmohon Ha-meem Academy
- Sakina Adarsha Academy, Daulatkhan
- Sukdeb M. M. High School, Daulatkhan

=== Teacher Training Colleges ===
- Principal Nazrul Islam Teachers Training College, Char Fashion, Bhola.

=== Religious Institutions ===
- Charfasson Karamatia Kamil Madrasa
- Al Madrasatul Azizia Darul Ulum Al Islamia, Charshuvi Madrasa
- Charkhalifa Madrasa

== Health ==
There is 1 modern government hospital, 6 government health complexes, 1 Tuberculosis clinic, 1 mother and child care, 1 diabetic hospital, 276 satellite clinics and 2 government child care in this district.

== Transportation ==
There is no railway and airport in this district and no direct connection to the capital by road. Waterways are the main medium of transportation. Launch, steamer and sheep are used for transportation. Bhola is 195 km away from Dhaka by waterways and 247 km away by road. Total area of rivers is 1133.46 km^{2}. Total length of road is 3893.65 km, concrete road is 3001.8 km and dirt road is 899.85 km.

Major launch services are M.V Greenline 1&2 M.V Bhola, Tasrif, Shompod, Srinagar, Karnaphuli, Balia, M.V Parijaat and Lali. Depending on season, different class of ships operate from Bhola to Lakhshmipur connecting west and east side of Bangladesh across mighty Meghna river. During calm winter seasons small ships and speedboats are available all day long from the Ilisha port, but during monsoon, heavy coastal ships like M.V Parijaat and Sea-tricks are the only means of crossing Meghna. The condition of internal travels is very good. Road transportation is available between the sub-districts. Sea-truck is used for travelling Monpura sub-district.

== Members of the 13th parliament ==
The district is divided into four parliamentary constituencies. In the 2018 general election, the Awami League won all four seats.

Currently, three seats are occupied by members of Bangladesh Nationalist Party and one by Bangladesh Jatiya Party.

Member	Seat	Party
Andaleeve Rahman Partho	Bhola-1	Bangladesh Jatiya Party
Hafiz Ibrahim	Bhola-2	Bangladesh Nationalist Party
Hafizuddin Ahmed	Bhola-3	Bangladesh Nationalist Party
Mohammad Nurul Islam	Bhola-4	Bangladesh Nationalist Party

== Points of interest ==
1. Manpura Island
2. Char Kukri Mukri
3. Deuli
4. Dhal Char
5. Manpura landing station
6. Tarua Beach
7. Independence Museum
8. Shahbazpur Gas Field
9. Jakob Tower
10. Nizam-Hasina Foundation Mosque
11. Tulatuli
12. Fashion Square, Char Fasson
13. Charfasson Eid Gah
14. Charfasson BM. Town-Hall
15. Maya Bridge
16. Charfasson Binodon Park
17. Betuya launch ghat (Prosanti Park)
18. Ministry Khamarbari Resort
19. Char Kajur Gachiya Beach
20. Dakshin Aicha Thana
21. Charfasson Bus Terminal
22. Charfasson Samraj Gat
23. Five Kopat Gat
24. Char Patila
25. Char Sondip
26. Abdul Jabbar Chowdhury Bari
27. Bir Sreshtho Mostafa Kamal Memorial Museum and Library
28. Borhanuddin Zamindar Bari

== Notable residents ==
- Mostafa Kamal (Bir Sreshtho), freedom fighter in 1971
- Abdul Hye Choudhury, lawyer and politician and provincial law minister of East Pakistan and judge of the Dhaka High Court.
- Azahar Uddin Ahmed ,politician and physician(MLA) and deputy leader of the East Pakistan Provincial Assembly.
- Naziur Rahman Manzur, MP, Mayor of Dhaka, founder of Bangladesh Jatiya Party
- Major Hafizuddin Ahmed (Bir Bikrom), politician and footballer
- Nazimuddin Alam, MP
- Jafar Ullah Chowdhury, MP
- Tofail Ahmed, MP
- Saad Zagulul Faruk, MP, academician and politician
- M. M. Nazrul Islam, MP, academician and politician
- Abdullah Al Islam Jakob, MP
- Andaleeve Rahman, MP
- Mosharraf Hossain Shahjahan
- Amir Jang Ghaznavi, footballer
- Nalini Das (revolutionary),
- Bhuiya Iqbal, writer
- Rafiqul Islam (Bir Bikrom), freedom fighter
- Nurunnabi Chowdhury, MP
