= Kukri Mukri =

Island in Bangladesh

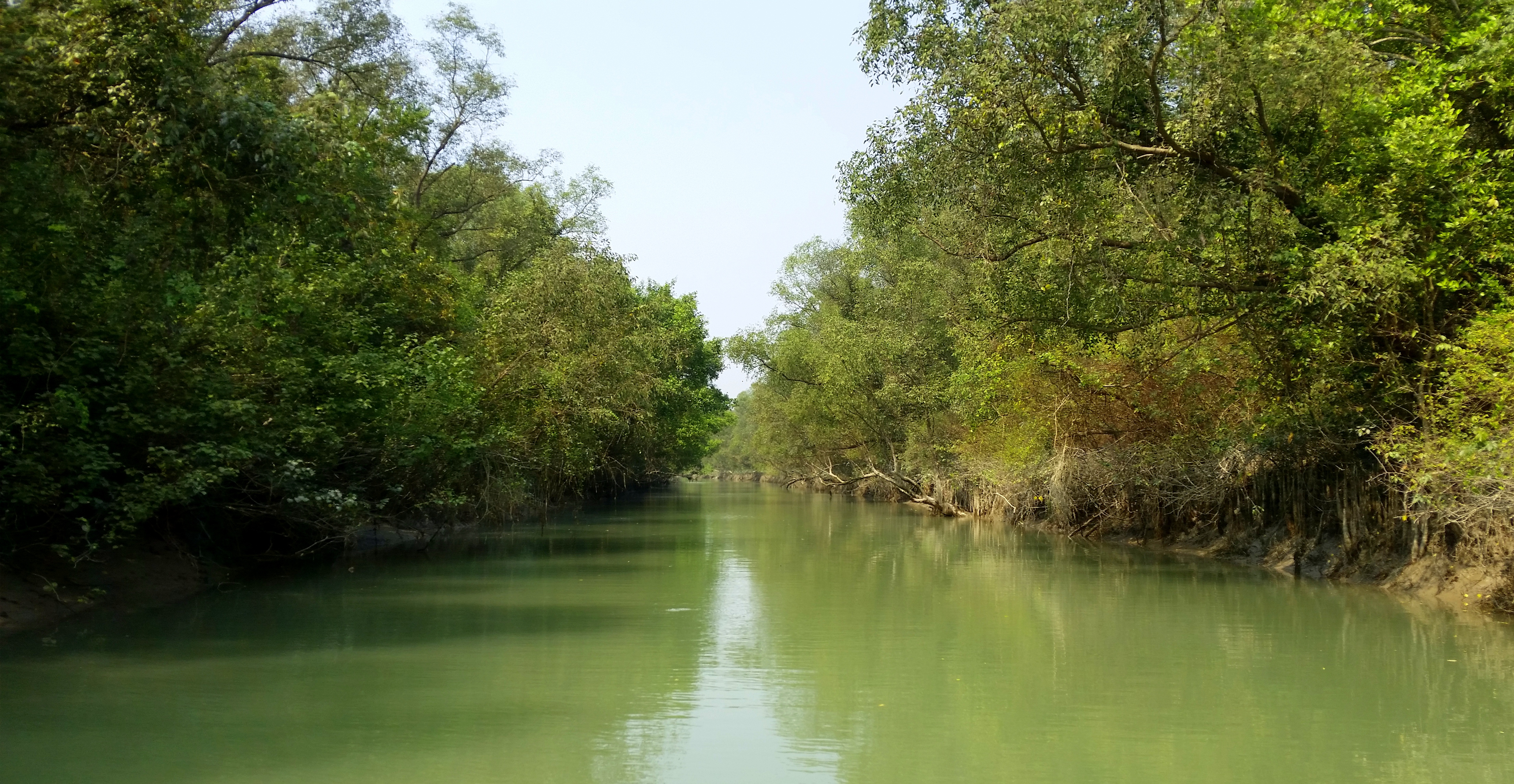
- A view of Kukri Mukri Island

- Location within Bangladesh

Geography
- Location: Bay of Bengal
- Coordinates: 21.9351°N 90.6406°E
- Area: 25 km^{2} (9.7 sq mi)
- Length: 10 km (6 mi)
- Width: 9.5 km (5.9 mi)

Administration
- Bangladesh
- Division: Barisal Division
- District: Bhola District

Demographics
- Population: Inhabited

Additional information
- Home to Char Kukri-Mukri Wildlife Sanctuary

Kukri Mukri (Bengali: কুকরি মুকরি; Bengali pronunciation: [kukri mukri]) is an island (char) of Char Kukri Mukri union, Bhola District, in southern Bangladesh. It is the southernmost part of the district.

== Etymology ==
The name Kukri Mukri is commonly explained through a local tradition that associates the island with dogs and rats. According to this account, the name derives from "Kukuria Mekuria," meaning "dog and cat island." The tradition further suggests that the island was once inhabited by unusually large rats, which were said to resemble dogs and cats.

A separate local legend attributes the name to a visit by a prince, sometimes identified in local accounts as Prince Brown, who allegedly encountered dogs and cats on the otherwise sparsely inhabited island.

== Geography ==
Kukri Mukri is 10 kilometres (6.2 mi) long, 9.5 kilometres (5.9 mi) across at its widest, and its total area is 25 square kilometres (9.7 sq mi). The land is low-lying, and at high tide extensive portions are under water. Much of the shore is mud flats. The Char Kukri-Mukri Wildlife Sanctuary lies on the island.

== History ==
No historically accurate information is available about Kukri Mukri history. It is believed that this char arose in 1912. Its area is 3 thousand 403 square kilometers.

== See also ==
- List of islands of Bangladesh
- Char Kukri-Mukri Wildlife Sanctuary
