= Tentulia River =

River in Bangladesh

Coordinates: 22.218°N 90.646°E

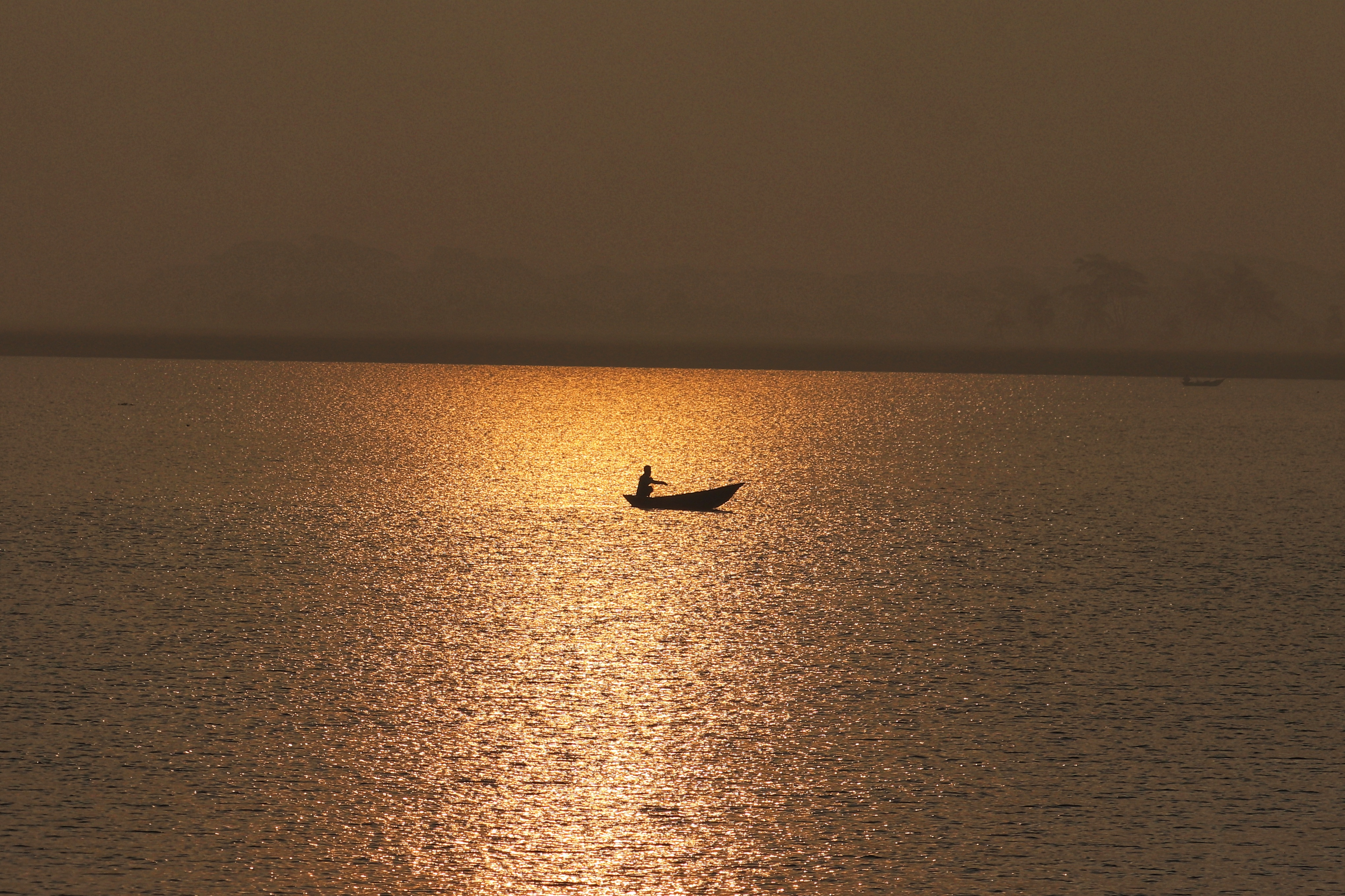

The Tentulia River, called Ilsha for part of its length, is located in southern Bangladesh. It is one of the larger coastal rivers of the Ganges-Padma system, and adds major flow to the Meghna River. The Ilsha is one of four principal mouths through which the Meghna empties into the Bay of Bengal in Bhola District.

== River Course ==
The Tentulia River originates from the Meghna River at Ilisha Union of Bhola Sadar Upazila. Thereafter, its water flows through Char Kajal and Panpatti unions and continues to Chaltabunia Union of Galachipa Upazila in Patuakhali District, where it ultimately empties into the Bay of Bengal. The river carries water throughout the year and is navigable by both small and large vessels. During the monsoon season, the river’s water flow increases and the surrounding basin becomes inundated with floods. The river is influenced by tidal fluctuations. It has been recognized as a first-class navigational route by the Bangladesh Inland Water Transport Authority.

== See also ==
- List of rivers of Bangladesh
