= Bhola (town) =

Bhola ভোলা
- Town; Municipality
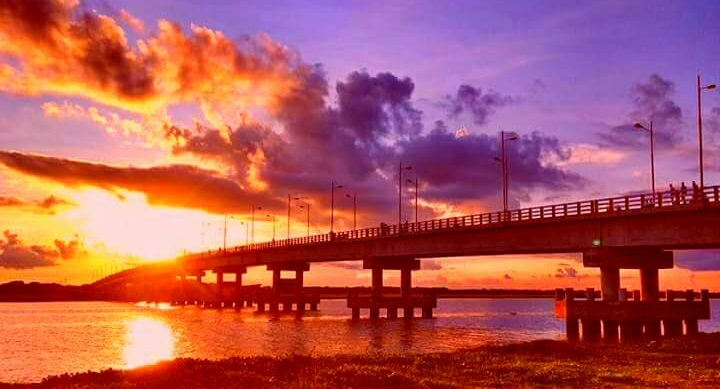
- Bridge connecting Bhola and Barisal

- Location of Bhola town in Bangladesh Bhola (Bangladesh)
- Coordinates: 22.686286°N 90.646065°E
- Country: Bangladesh
- Division: Barisal
- District: Bhola
- Upazila: Bhola Sadar

Government
  - Type: Municipality
  - Paura Mayor: Mohammod Monirujjaman

Area
  - Total: 31.9 km^{2} (12.3 sq mi)

Population (2011)
  - Total: 47,477
  - Density: 1,490/km^{2} (3,850/sq mi)
- Time zone: UTC+6 (BST)

Bhola (Bengali: ভোলা) is a town and district headquarters of Bhola District in Barisal Division, Bangladesh.

== Administration ==
Bhola sub-division was established under the Noakhali district in 1845. At that time its administrative center was at Amania of Daulatkhan. The sub-division was included in the Barisal district in 1869. The sub-division then consisted of Daulatkhan and Burhanuddin Hat Thanas and three outposts, namely, Taltali, Gazipur, and Tazumuddin. The sub-divisional headquarters was shifted from Daulatkhan to Bhola in 1876. It was elevated to a district on 1 February 1984.

== Demographics ==
As of 2011, Bhola has 9,635 households and a population of 47,477. 9,320 (19.63%) were under 10 years of age. Bhola had a literacy rate of 76.04% and a sex ratio of 939 females per 1,000 males.

== Climate ==
Climate data for Bhola (1991–2020, extremes 1965-present)
Month	Jan	Feb	Mar	Apr	May	Jun	Jul	Aug	Sep	Oct	Nov	Dec	Year
Record high °C (°F)	31.0 (87.8)	34.7 (94.5)	38.8 (101.8)	38.9 (102.0)	37.8 (100.0)	37.0 (98.6)	37.2 (99.0)	36.6 (97.9)	37.3 (99.1)	36.5 (97.7)	34.5 (94.1)	31.0 (87.8)	38.9 (102.0)
Mean daily maximum °C (°F)	25.4 (77.7)	28.6 (83.5)	32.0 (89.6)	33.2 (91.8)	33.1 (91.6)	32.0 (89.6)	31.1 (88.0)	31.4 (88.5)	31.6 (88.9)	31.8 (89.2)	29.9 (85.8)	26.7 (80.1)	30.6 (87.1)
Daily mean °C (°F)	17.8 (64.0)	21.5 (70.7)	25.8 (78.4)	28.2 (82.8)	28.9 (84.0)	28.7 (83.7)	28.2 (82.8)	28.4 (83.1)	28.2 (82.8)	27.3 (81.1)	23.7 (74.7)	19.4 (66.9)	25.5 (77.9)
Mean daily minimum °C (°F)	12.3 (54.1)	15.8 (60.4)	20.9 (69.6)	24.1 (75.4)	25.3 (77.5)	26.1 (79.0)	26.0 (78.8)	26.1 (79.0)	25.8 (78.4)	24.1 (75.4)	19.3 (66.7)	14.4 (57.9)	21.7 (71.1)
Record low °C (°F)	4.4 (39.9)	9.5 (49.1)	12.3 (54.1)	17.5 (63.5)	19.0 (66.2)	20.4 (68.7)	22.7 (72.9)	23.4 (74.1)	22.0 (71.6)	18.5 (65.3)	13.0 (55.4)	7.5 (45.5)	4.4 (39.9)
Average precipitation mm (inches)	8.0 (0.31)	21.0 (0.83)	44.0 (1.73)	98.0 (3.86)	235.0 (9.25)	418.0 (16.46)	448.0 (17.64)	360.0 (14.17)	295.0 (11.61)	192.0 (7.56)	41.0 (1.61)	7.0 (0.28)	2,167 (85.31)
Average precipitation days (≥ 1.0 mm)	1.0	2.0	3.0	6.0	12.0	19.0	24.0	23.0	17.0	9.0	2.0	1.0	119.0
Average relative humidity (%)	81	77	77	81	84	88	90	89	89	86	83	82	84
Mean monthly sunshine hours	190.0	198.4	212.9	208.5	184.7	128.9	117.7	133.1	136.6	190.3	209.4	180.6	2,091.1
Source 1: NOAA
Source 2: Bangladesh Meteorological Department (humidity 1981–2010)
