= Barisal Division =

Division of Bangladesh

Barisal Division বরিশাল বিভাগ
- Division
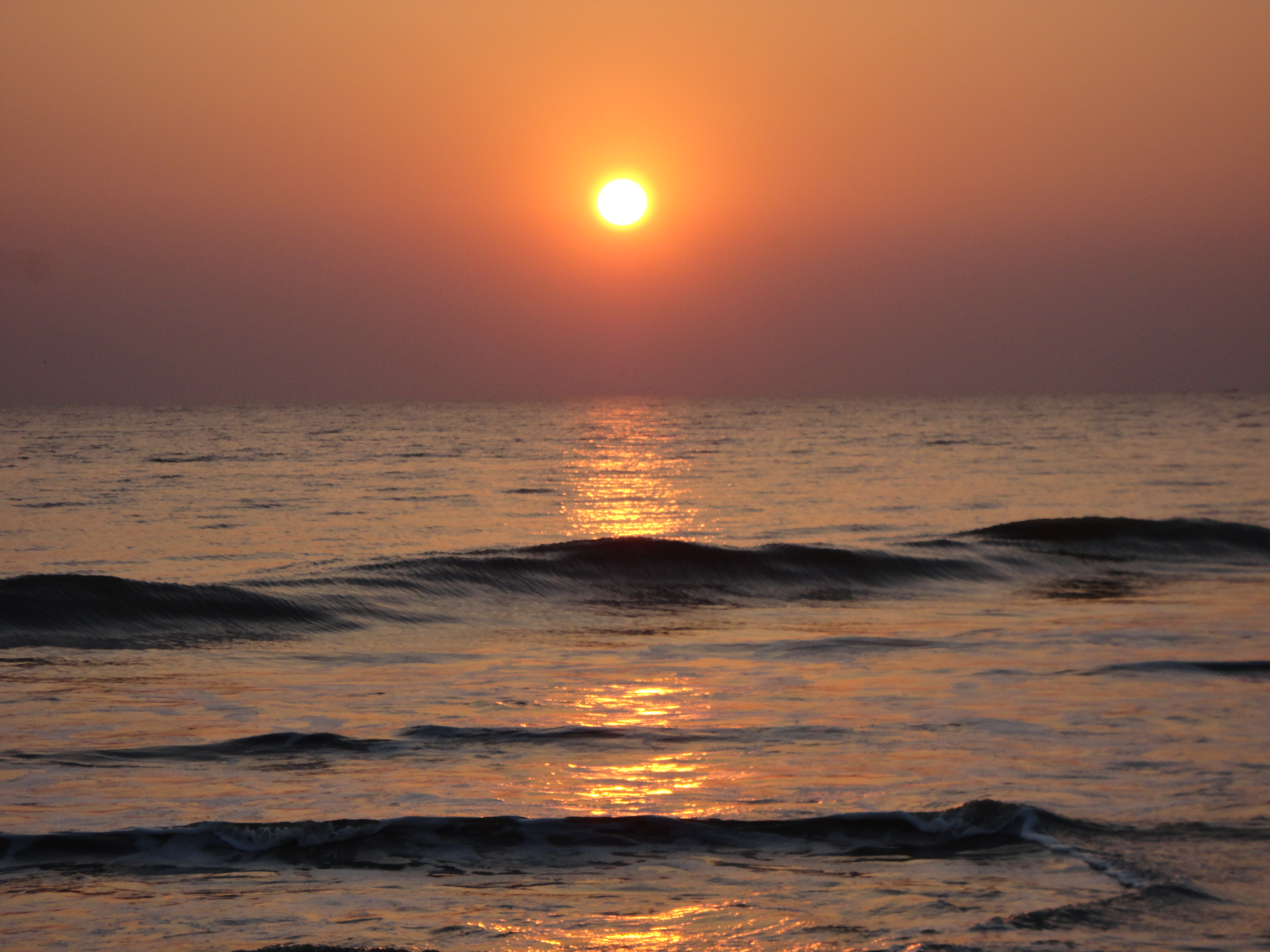
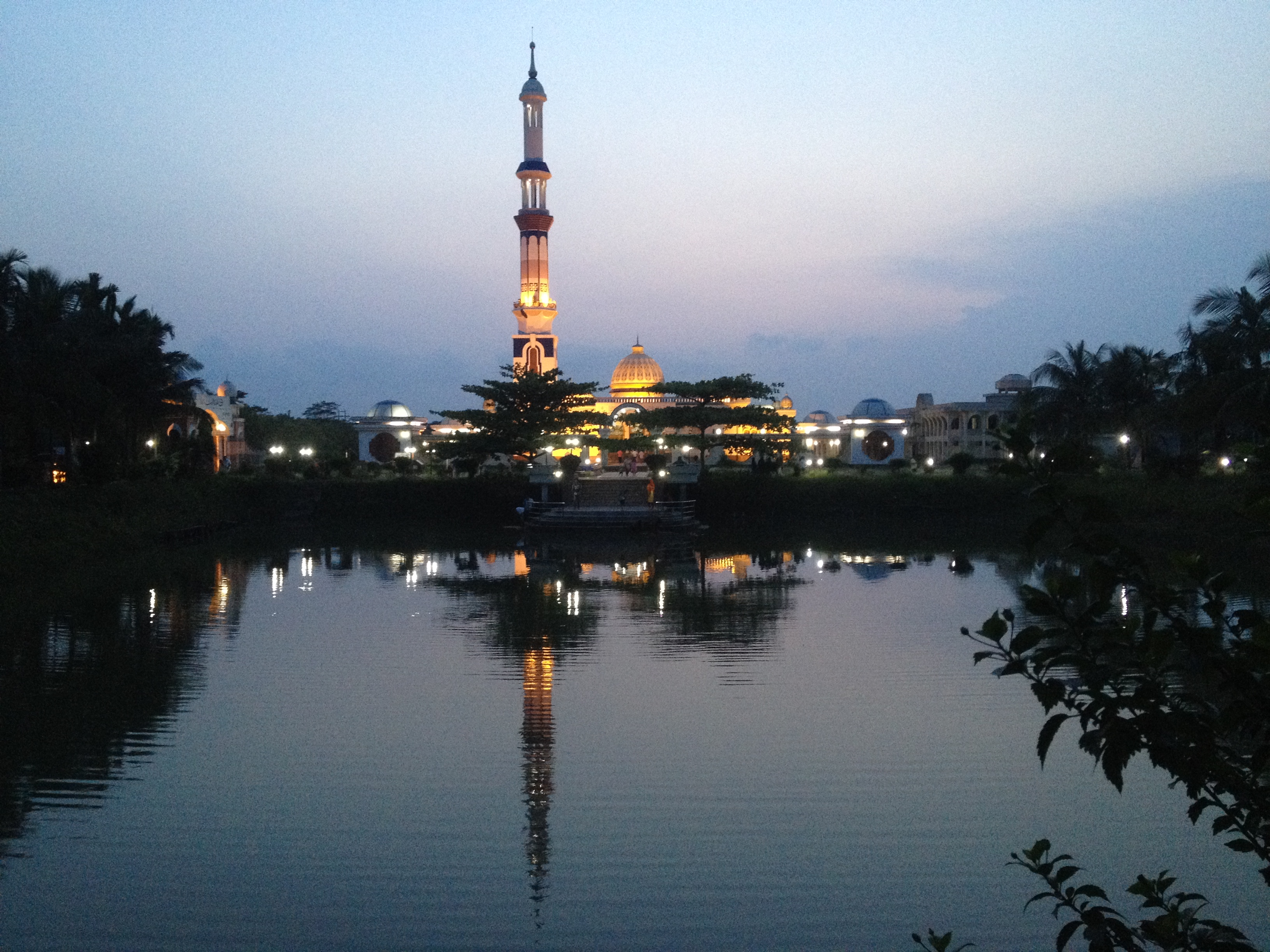
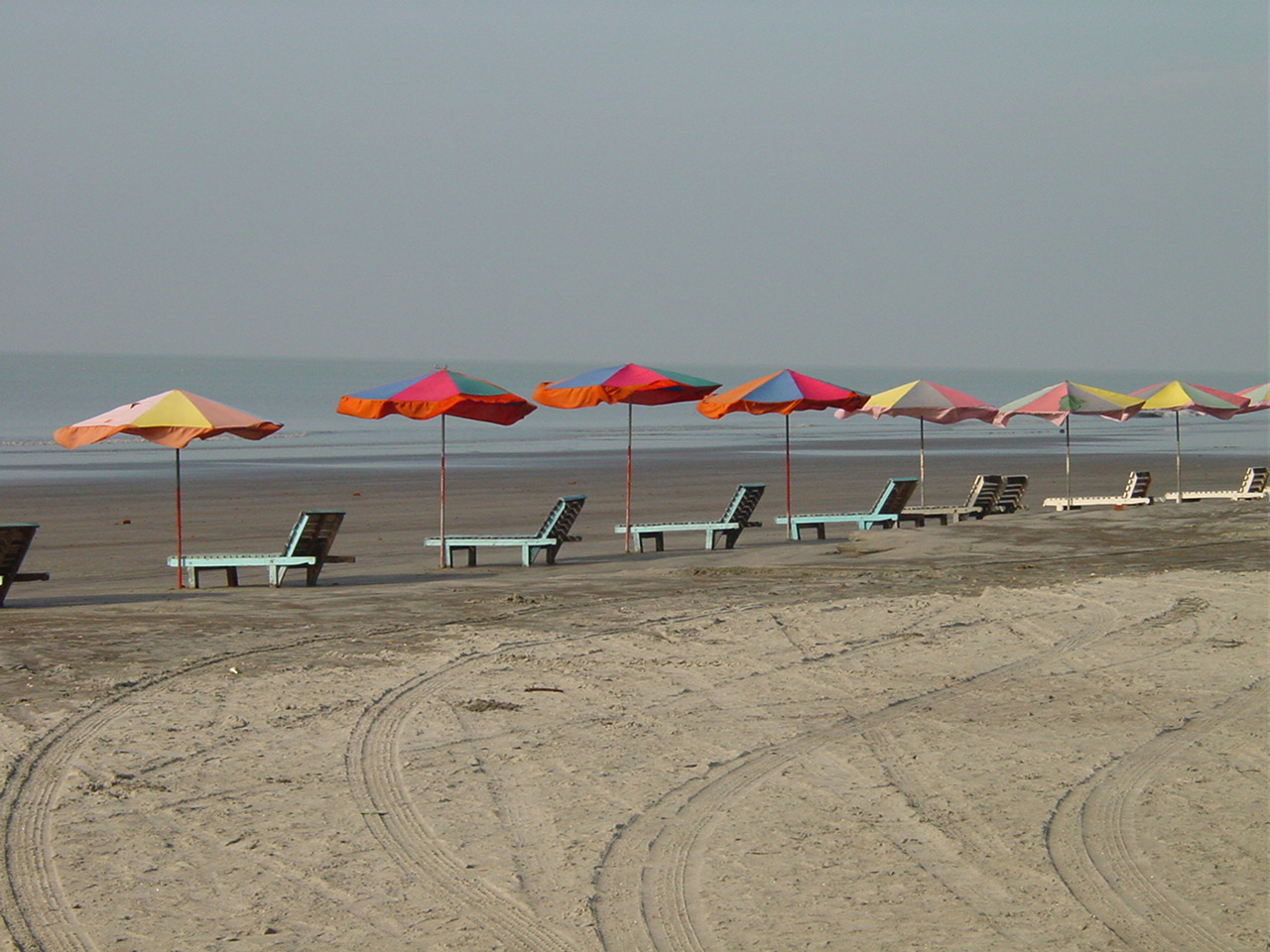
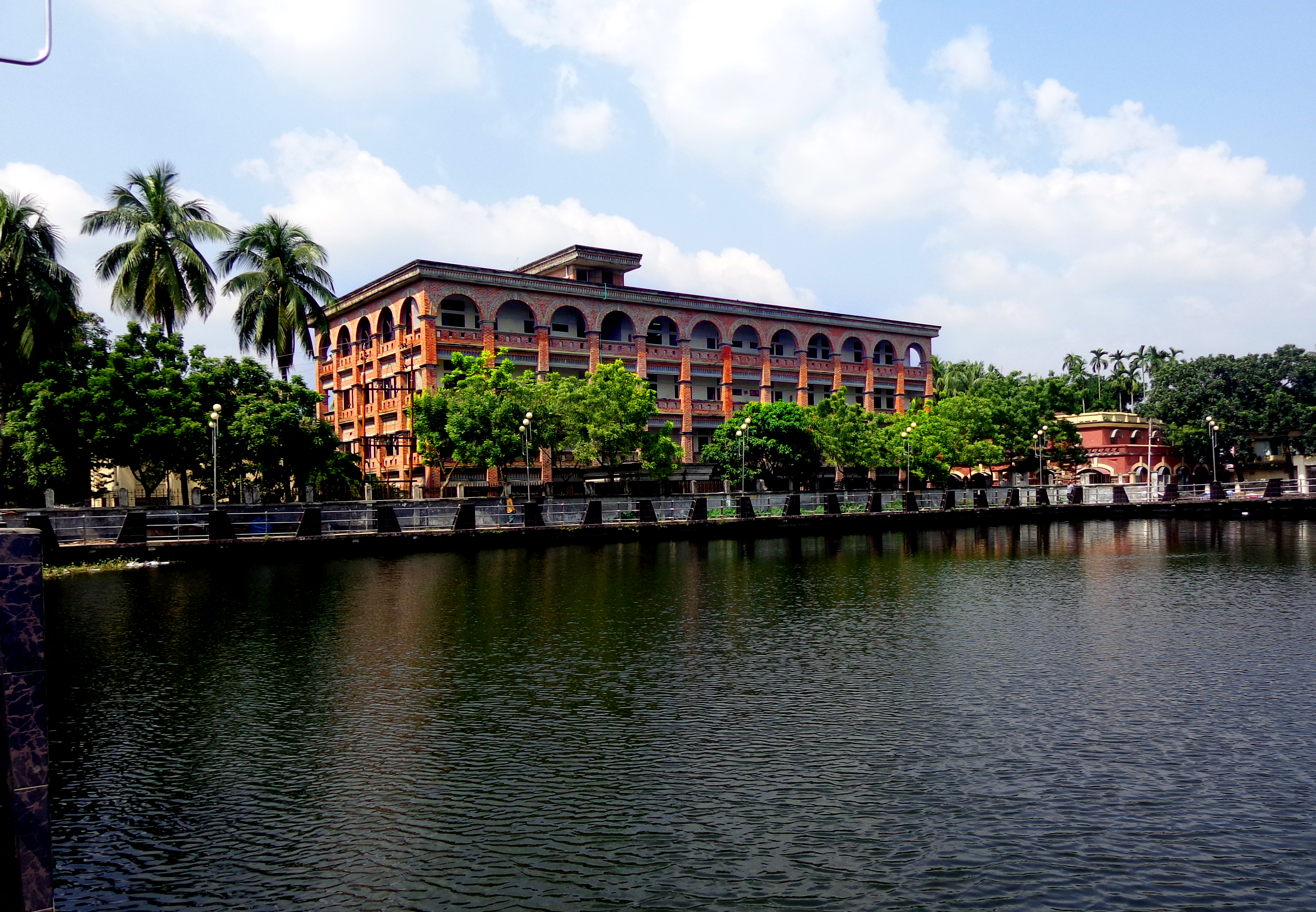
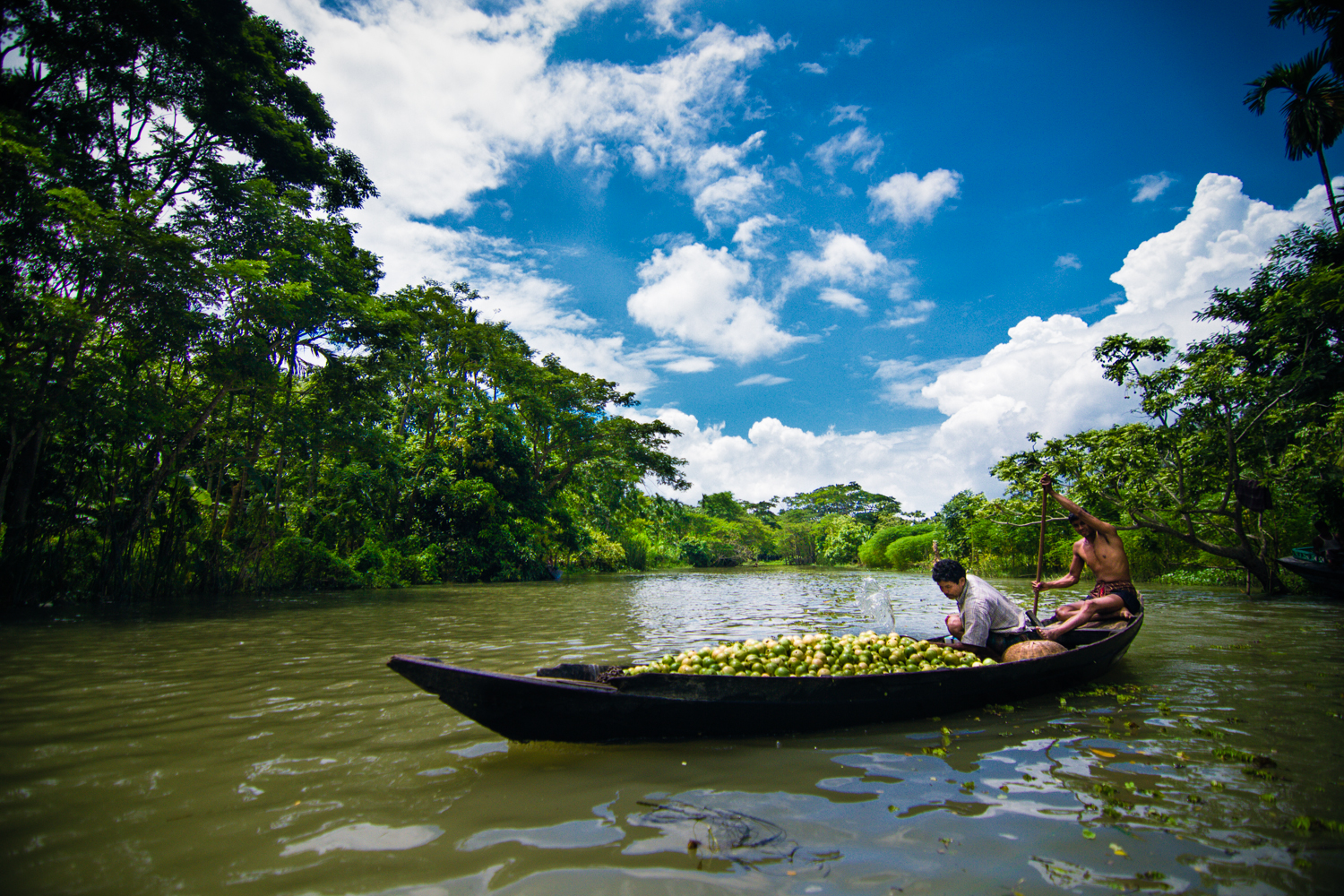
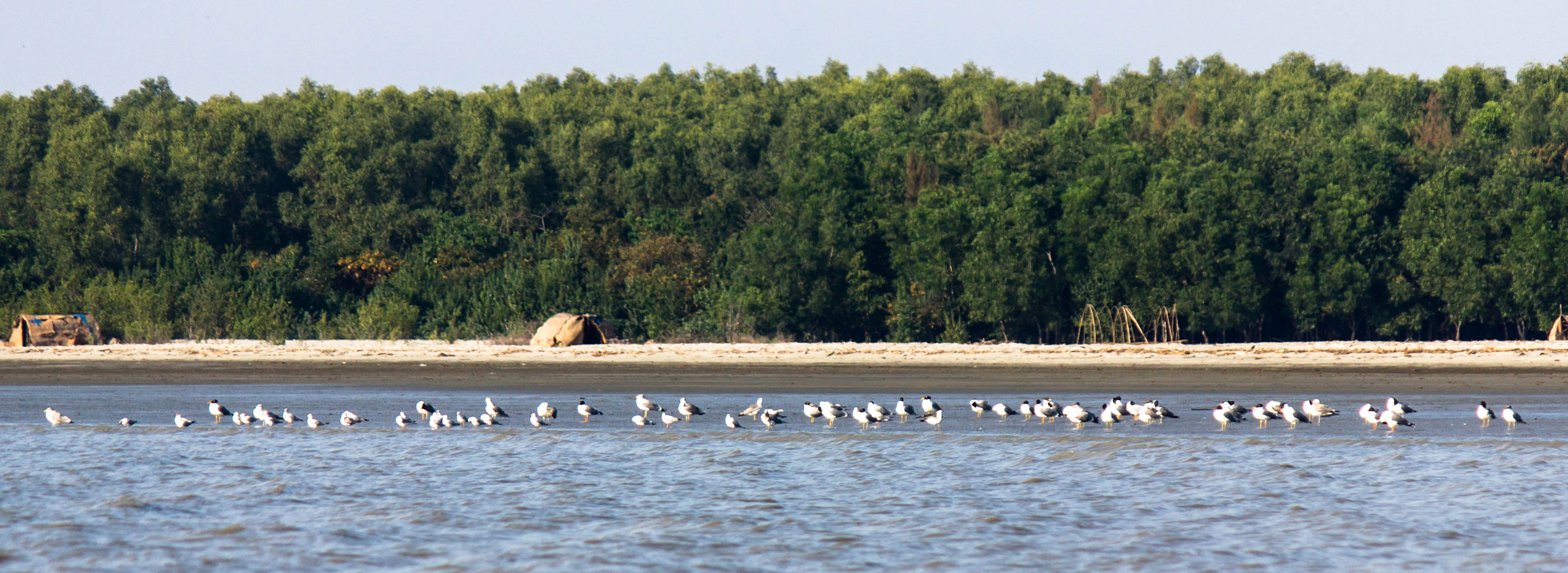
- Clockwise from the top: Bay of Bengal, Kuakata Beach, Floating stalls at Nesarabad, Edges of Sundarbans in Barguna, Barisal Collect-orate Edifice and Baitul Aman Mosque

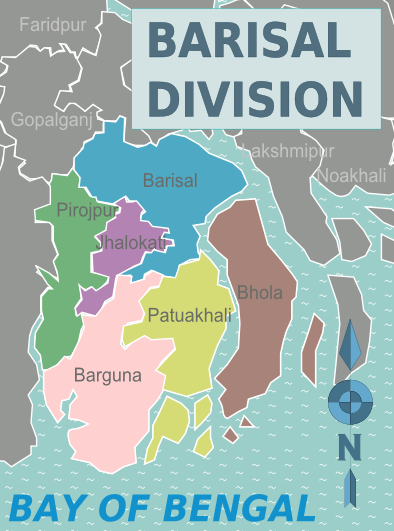
- Coordinates: 22°30′N 90°20′E
- Country: Bangladesh
- Established: 1 January 1993
- Capital and largest city: Barisal

Government
  - Divisional Commissioner: Md. Rayhan Kawsar
  - DIG: Md. Monzur Morshed Alam
  - Parliamentary constituency: Jatiya Sangsad (21 seats)

Area
  - Division: 13,225 km^{2} (5,106 sq mi)
- Elevation: 1.2 m (3.9 ft)

Population (2022)
  - Division: 9,100,104 (Enumerated)
  - Density: 688.10/km^{2} (1,782.2/sq mi)
  - Urban: 2,286,285
  - Rural: 6,811,636
  - Metro: 419,472
  - Adjusted Population: 9,325,820
- Demonyms: Barishali, Borishailla, Bholaiya

Languages
  - Official language: Bengali
  - Indigenous minority languages: List: Rakhine
- Time zone: UTC+6 (BST)
- ISO 3166 code: BD-A
- HDI (2023): 0.702 high
- Notable cricket teams: Fortune Barishal, Barisal Division
- Districts: 6
- Sub-Districts: 41
- Union Councils: 352
- Website: Barisal Division

Barisal Division (Bengali: বরিশাল বিভাগ, romanized: Borishal Bibhag; Bengali pronunciation: [boriʃal bibʱag]) is one of the eight administrative divisions of Bangladesh. Located in the south-central part of the country, it has an area of 13,225 km^{2} (5,106 sq mi), and a population of 9,325,820 at the 2022 census. It is the least populous division in Bangladesh. It is bounded by Dhaka Division on the north, the Bay of Bengal on the south, Chittagong Division on the east and Khulna Division on the west. The administrative capital, Barisal city, lies in the Padma River delta on an offshoot of the Arial Khan River. Barisal division is criss-crossed by numerous rivers that earned it the nickname Dhan-Nodi-Khal, Ei tin-e Borishal (rice, river and canal built Barisal).

== Etymology ==
Barisal Division is named after its headquarters, the city of Barisal. The toponym Barisal is etymologically derived from the Perso-Arabic phrase "Bahr-e-Sawal," translating to "the ship of questions". This appellation is rooted in the interactions of Semitic Arab maritime traders, who, in their nautical endeavours, referred to their sea-bound merchant vessels as bahr, which has endured as a term in the lexicon of the Bengali language to this day. The perilous and turbulent waters of Bengal's southern seacoast, notorious for their treacherous waves, presented a hazardous maritime route. As such, upon encountering this tempestuous stretch of coastline, the Arab traders would often be prompted to pose various queries (sawal) regarding the safety, conditions, and navigability of the route. Over time, this word was corrupted to the name Barisal.

== History ==
=== Ancient period ===
The modern Barisal division area was the part of Vanga and Gangaridai empire in ancient times. The historic land of Vaṅga (Bôngô in Bengali), situated in present-day Barisal division. After the fall of Gupta rule in Bengal, the region became a part of Gauda Kingdom in the 6th century. Later the region came under the rule of Khadgas, Palas, Chandras and Varmans in the early mediaeval period. In ancient times, the region was known as the name Bangala from which probably the medieval name 'Bakla' derived. According to the epigraphical records of Sena period, the modern Barisal was known as Anuttara Banga (southern Bengal), an ancient division of Bengal region. After the Sena Dynasty, Barisal was ruled by Deva kings in the 12th-13th century.

=== Early Middle Ages ===
In early times, the Barisal region was composed of an amalgamation of marshlands formed by the merging of islands brought into existence and built up by alluvial soils washed down the great channels of the combined Brahmaputra-Ganges-Meghna river systems.

In the early 13th century, Muhammad bin Bakhtiyar Khalji led the Muslim conquest of Barisal, and soon later Muhammad bin Tughluq completely conquered eastern Bengal. The Hindu chieftains from northwest Bengal were dislodged from power and they dispersed over Barisal region and founded the kingdom of Bakla.

During the Mughal intervention in Bengal, Hindu society was concentrated to northern and western Barisal (known as Bakarganj). Barisal's southern portion was still covered by forests and laced with lagoons. The northwest was also the only part of Bakarganj where the Hindu population exceeded Muslims in early British censuses.

=== Mughal period ===
Barisal saw a second wave of immigration in the late 17th and early 18th centuries. This time, it was Muslim pioneers who assumed the leading role. Establishing Dhaka as the provincial Mughal capital of the region, in the early 17th century the Barisal region (known as Sarkar Bakla to Mughals) was more accessible to businessmen and developers than at any previous time. However, piracy in this region along the coasts and rivers of southeastern Bengal by Arakanese and renegade Portuguese seamen inhibited any sustained attempts by Mughal governors to push into the Barisal forests.

After 1666, when Mughal naval forces cleared the Meghna estuary of such external threats, the Barisal interior lay ripe for colonization. Land developers acquired grants of plots of land, taluq (তালুক), from provincial authorities. Abundant and easily obtainable by purchase from the late 17th century, these grants tended to be regarded by their possessors taluqdar (তালুকদার). As taluqdars brought their taluqs into agricultural production, these men passed up the land revenue through a class of non-cultivating intermediaries, or zamindar (জমিদার). Zamindars typically resided in the provincial capital, where they had ready access to the chief provincial revenue officer, or dewan (দেওয়ান).

In a second pattern of land development, Muslim pirs or Qazi went directly into uncultivated regions, organized the local population for clearing the jungles, and only later, after having established themselves as local men of influence, entered into relations with the Mughal authorities. Relationships between Muslim pirs and Mughal authorities were not always harmonious, since a pir's natural ties of authority and patronage usually lay with the peasant masses beneath him rather than with the governors and bureaucrats. For example, in remote Jhalakati Thana in the eastern Bakarganj many of 18th-century pirs and Educationist, Islamic scholars came under the authority, among them named Saiyid Faqir and Faizus Ahmed Khan (A Persian business man and educationist, came for the business trade through Khyber pass and spread education among the Indian sub continent) from wielded enormous influence with the cultivators of the all-Muslim village of Saiyidpur, Hizla and Muladi named after the pirs. But a difficulty arose, noted a 1906 village survey of Pir Fakir of Saiyidpur village, because "the people of this part looked upon the Fakir as their guide and did not pay rent to the Nawab." In this situation, one Lala Chet Singh, a captain in the employ of the governor, "succeeded in persuading the Fakir to leave the country."

=== British era ===
In 1797, the area was established as Bakerganj District but later renamed as Barisal District and Pir of Hizla-Muladi, Faizus Ahmed Khan stayed back and settled in Muladi-Hizla village.

=== Pakistani era ===
In 1948, a part of Bakerganj District area was renamed as Barisal and other was Patuakhali District as one of five districts of Khulna Division.

=== Bangladesh ===
The Greater Barisal region (Barisal District along with five other neighbouring districts) was created as Barisal Division on 1 January 1993.

== Economy ==
Barisal is known as the "Granary of Bengal" for its rice production. It is still an important rice-producing area of the country. Since the Middle Ages, Barisal has acted as a trans-shipment center for hides, rice, dried beans, dried peas, lentils, chickpeas, and other legumes for Bengal. Bakery, textile, and pharmaceutical products are the output of a few industrial installations. There are Sher-e Bangla Medical College (affiliated with the National University) and B. M. College (an educational institution of Barisal Division established in 1889). Barisal is also a river port once connecting Calcutta-Barisal-Dhaka and many other routes. Today Barisal River port is the most important hub of steamer and motor launch service of Southern Bangladesh.

== Points of interest ==
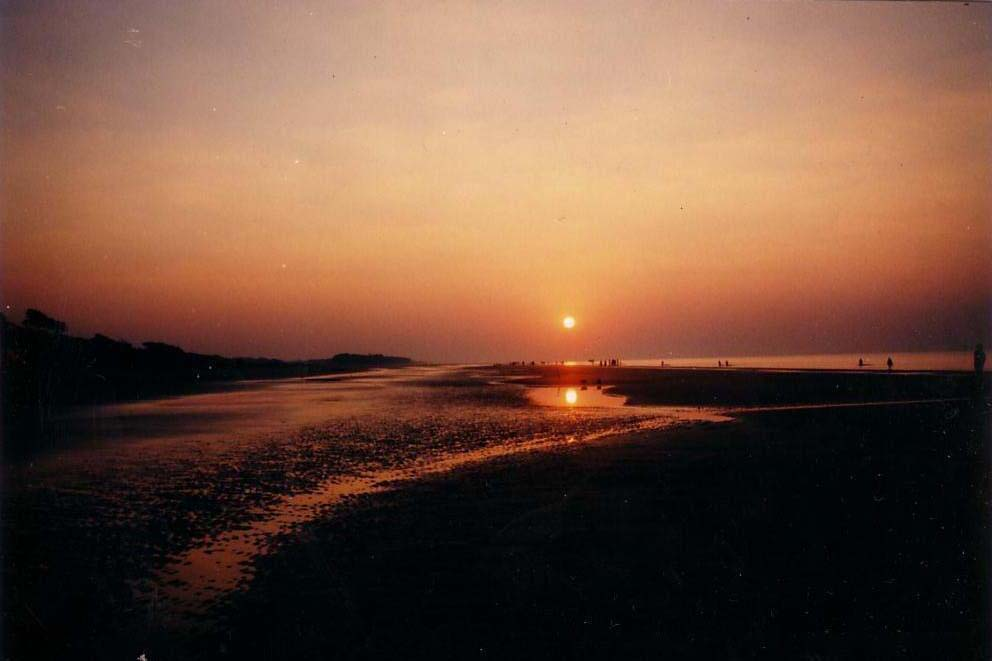
Sunrise at Kuakata sea beach, Barisal

Kuakata beach is the main tourist spot in the division. It is a sea beach from which one can watch the sun both rise and set over the ocean.

Durga Sagar is a man-made pond where a number of migratory birds arrive every winter.

Guthia Mosque is a mosque complex built over a land area of 5.7 hectares (14 acres), comparing to the 3.36 ha (8.30 acres) land area of the national mosque Baitul Mukarram.

Char Kukri-Mukri Wildlife Sanctuary (Bengali: চর কুকরি মুকরি বন্যপ্রানী সংরক্ষণ অভয়ারন্য) is a wildlife sanctuary in southern Char Fasson Upazila of Bangladesh, located on Char Kukri Mukri island in the Bay of Bengal in the south of the country.

== Administration ==
The division is subdivided into six districts (zilas) and then into 42 sub-districts (upazilas; Rangabali in Patuakhali and Taltoli in Barguna being the most recent). Lower level administrative areas are 353 union parishads, 3,159 mouzas, 12 municipalities, 25 wards and 4,163 villages.

Name	Capital	Area (km^{2})	Population 1991 Census	Population 2001 Census	Population 2011 Census	Population 2022 Census
Barisal District	Barisal	2,784.52	2,207,426	2,355,967	2,324,310	2,570,446
Barguna District	Barguna	1,831.31	775,693	848,554	892,781	1,010,531
Bhola District	Bhola	3,403.48	1,476,328	1,703,117	1,776,795	1,932,518
Jhalokati District	Jhalokati	706.76	666,139	694,231	682,669	661,160
Patuakhali District	Patuakhali	3,221.31	1,273,872	1,460,781	1,535,854	1,727,254
Pirojpur District	Pirojpur	1,277.80	1,063,185	1,111,068	1,113,257	1,198,195
Total Districts	6	13,255.20	7,462,643	8,173,718	8,325,666	9,100,104

List of Upazilas in Barisal Division

District	Upazila
Barisal District	1. Agailjhara Upazila; 2. Babuganj Upazila; 3. Bakerganj Upazila; 4. Banaripara Upazila; 5. Barisal Sadar Upazila; 6. Gournadi Upazila; 7. Hizla Upazila; 8. Mehendiganj Upazila; 9. Muladi Upazila; 10. Wazirpur Upazila
Barguna District	1. Amtali Upazila; 2. Bamna Upazila; 3. Barguna Sadar Upazila; 4. Betagi Upazila; 5. Patharghata Upazila; 6. Taltali Upazila
Bhola District	1. Bhola Sadar Upazila; 2. Daulatkhan Upazila; 3. Burhanuddin Upazila; 4. Tazumuddin Upazila; 5. Lalmohan Upazila; 6. Char Fasson Upazila; 7. Manpura Upazila
Jhalokati District	1. Jhalokati Sadar Upazila; 2. Kathalia Upazila; 3. Nalchity Upazila; 4. Rajapur Upazila
Patuakhali District	1. Dumki Upazila; 2. Patuakhali Sadar Upazila; 3. Mirzaganj Upazila; 4. Bauphal Upazila; 5. Galachipa Upazila; 6. Dashmina Upazila; 7. Rangabali Upazila; 8. Kalapara Upazila
Pirojpur District	1. Bhandaria Upazila; 2. Kawkhali; 3. Mathbaria Upazila; 4. Nazirpur Upazila; 5. Nesarabad Upazila; 6. Pirojpur Sadar Upazila; 7. Indurkani Upazila

== Transport ==
Numerous rivers and canals force the inhabitants to use boats as the main medium of transportation. The main rivers are the Arial Khan, Bishkhali, Burishwar, Tentulia, Paira, Haringhata, Baleshwar, Kirtankhola, Katcha, and Agunmukha. It is linked by steamers with Dhaka (117 km or 73 mi to the north) and with Chittagong to the southeast. Road communication has improved significantly over last decades with the building of many bridges. The Barisal airport has regular service to Dhaka.

== Education ==
Barisal Division has the highest literacy rate (age 7 and over) of any division in the country, 65.7% as of the 2011 Bangladesh census.

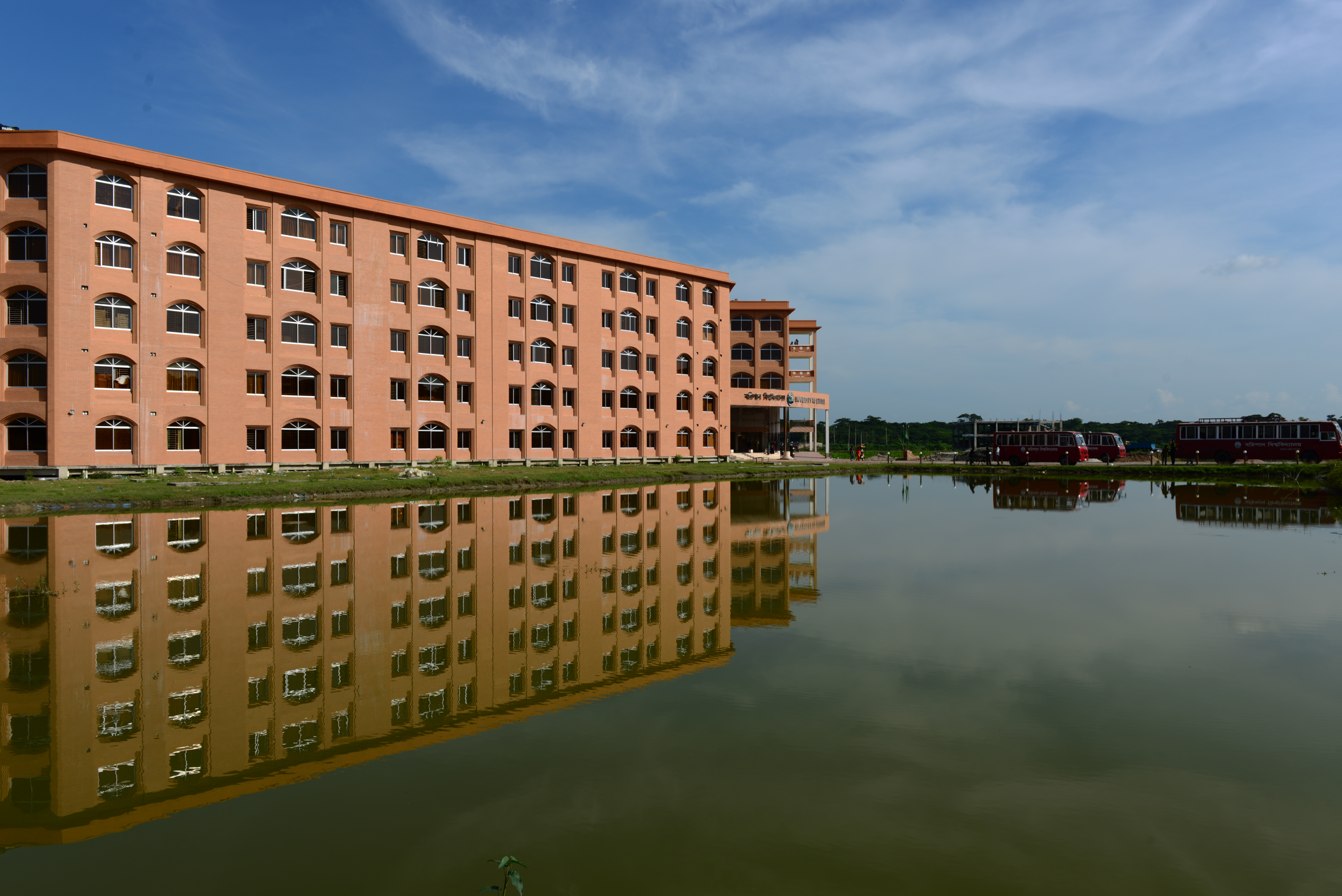
Academic buildings of the University of Barisal

There are three public universities in the division:

- Patuakhali Science and Technology University, founded in 2002.
- University of Barisal founded in 2011.
- Pirojpur Science and Technology University founded in 2022 .

There are also three private universities:

- Global University Bangladesh
- University of Global Village
- Trust University Barisal

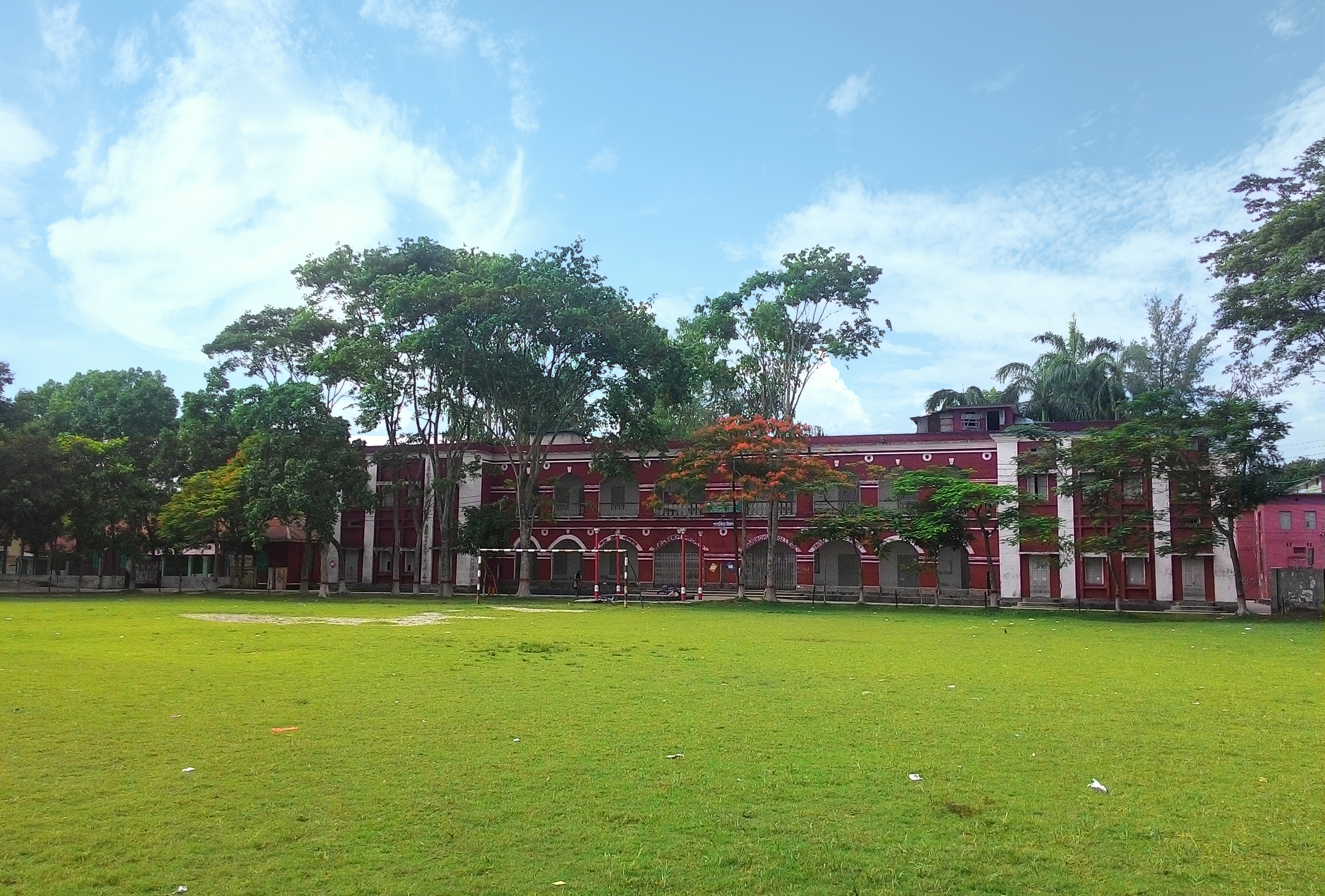
Brojomohun College,

There are 258 colleges in the division. They include:

- Charfasson Govt. College,
- Bhola Govt. College,
- Barisal Government Women's College,
- Brojomohun College (1889)
- Government Barisal College
- Government Syed Hatem Ali College,
- Syed Bazlul Haque College.

The division also contains specialized tertiary educational institutions: Two medical schools:

- Patuakhali Medical College (2014)
- Sher e Bangla Medical College (1968);

The Division also have four government polytechnic institutes & many private Polytechnic institutes;

- Barisal Polytechnic Institute
- Bhola Polytechnic Institute
- Patuakhali Polytechnic Institute
- Barguna Polytechnic Institute
- Infra Polytechnic Institute, Barisal (Private)

Three government textile colleges;

- Barishal Textile Engineering College for Undergraduate education under BUTEX
- Bhola Textile Institute, Bhola for Diploma in Engineering under BTEB
- Barishal Textile Institute, Barishal for Diploma in Engineering under BTEB

One Public Engineering college;

- Barisal Engineering College under University of Dhaka.

One military/Cadet college;

- Barishal Cadet College

Three law colleges;

- Barishal Law College
- Patuakhali Law College
- Pirojpur Law College

Four teacher training colleges;

- Govt. Teachers Training College, Barisal
- Principal Nazrul Islam Teachers Training College, Char Fashion, Bhola.
- Lalmia Teachers Training College, College Road, Barguna.
- Mathbaria Teachers Training College, Pirojpur.
- Pirojpur Teachers Training College, Pirojpur.
- Dokhinbongho Teachers Training College, Sher-e-Bangla Road, Patuakhali.

== Religion ==
Religion in Barisal Division (2022)
Religion	Percent
Muslims	91.56%
Hindus	8.24%
Christians	0.13%
Others	0.06%

== Notable residents ==
- Abul Hasanat Abdullah, Bangladesh Awami League politician, MP
- Mohiuddin Ahmed, a Language Movement veteran and 1971 War organiser
- Tania Ahmed, actress
- Tofail Ahmed, Bangladeshi politician, Minister of Commerce and Minister of Industries
- Ziauddin Ahmed, war hero, fighter and sub-sector Commander under Sector 9 of Mukti Bahini during Bangladesh Independence war in 1971
- Jewel Aich, magician, veteran of 1971 Bangladesh war
- Mir Maswood Ali, mathematician and statistician
- Amir Hossain Amu, politician
- Abdur Rahman Biswas, former President of Bangladesh
- Anil Biswas, Hindi and Bengali film song composer
- Mohammad Ali Bogra, Bengali politician, statesman, served as third Prime Minister of Pakistan, 1953 – 1955.
- Abala Bose, social reformer and wife of Jagadish Chandra Bose
- Nachiketa Chakraborty, famous Tollywood singer's family hails from Chechri Rampur village in Kathalia Upazila
- Abdul Gaffar Choudhury, an author, columnist, lyricist.
- Asad Chowdhury, poet, writer, translator, radio, television personality and journalist, as well as a cultural activist in Bangladesh.
- Jibanananda Das, poet
- Kusumkumari Das, poet and mother of Jibanananda Das
- Mukunda Das, Bengali poet, ballad singer, composer
- Gurudas Dasgupta, politician
- Basudeb DasSarma, chemist
- Arundhati Devi, Indian actress, director and writer
- Utpal Dutt, Indian actor, director and writer-playwright
- Aswini Kumar Dutta, social reformer and philanthropist
- Narayan Gangopadhyay, was a Bengali novelist, poet, essayist, and short story writer, a leading writer of modern Bengali literature.
- Sohag Gazi, Bangladeshi cricketer
- Debaprasad Ghosh, an Indian mathematician, linguist, lawyer, journalist, educationist and statesman.
- Nikhil Ghosh, was an Indian musician, teacher and writer, known his proficiency on the percussion instrument of tabla.
- Pannalal Ghosh, musician and flutist
- Parul Ghosh, was an Indian playback singer. Ghosh sang in Hindi and Bengali movies from 1935 to 1951.
- Jyotirmoy Guhathakurta, Bengali educator and humanist of East Pakistan
- Hiranmay Sen Gupta, physicist
- Ahsan Habib, Bangladeshi poet and literary figure
- A. M. Harun-ar-Rashid, Bangladeshi physicist and Bose Professor of Physics at the University of Dhaka
- Abul Hasan, poet, journalist and literary figure in Bengali culture
- Ehsan Hoque, medical doctor, social entrepreneur and child rights activist, founder and honorary executive director of Distressed Children & Infants International
- Mainul Hosein, lawyer and the printer, publisher of daily newspaper, The New Nation, former chairman of the editorial board of The Daily Ittefaq
- Kamal Hossain, Bangladeshi jurist, statesman and fighter, Minister of Law from 1972 to 1973 and as Minister of Foreign Affairs from 1973 to 1975.
- A.K. Fazlul Huq, Bengali lawyer, legislator and statesman
- Mohiuddin Jahangir (Bir Shreshto), a fighter
- Major M. A. Jalil, commander of Sector 9 during Bangladesh War of Independence in 1971.
- Shamsuddin Abul Kalam, actor and an author of Bengali literature
- Mostafa Kamal (Bir Shreshto), a fighter.
- Sufia Kamal, poet
- Fazlul Karim, scholar, academic, philosopher and essayist
- Mosharraf Karim, actor
- A.Z.M. Enayetullah Khan, veteran journalist, former minister of Bangladesh
- Abdul Jabbar Khan, 6th Speaker of the National Assembly of Pakistan.
- Abdul Karim Khan, folk-singer
- Sadek Khan, Bangladeshi journalist, columnist and filmmaker
- Salman Khan, founder of Khan Academy
- Abdul Wahab Khan, 3rd speaker of the National Assembly of Pakistan.
- Nazia Khanum, OBE DL, academic and management consultant
- Abdul Latif, singer, musician, and lyricist
- Altaf Mahmud, Bengali film song composer
- Anwar Hossain Manju, Bangladeshi politician
- Naziur Rahman Manzur, Jatiya Party politician
- Hasan Masood, Bangladeshi actor, former journalist and military officer
- Aroj Ali Matubbar, astronomer and philosopher
- Rashed Khan Menon, Bangladeshi politician
- Tofazzal Hossain Manik Miah, founder editor of The Daily Ittefaq
- Khalid Hassan Milu, Bangladeshi singer
- Mehedi Hasan Miraz, Bangladeshi cricketer
- Ghulam Murshid, author, scholar and journalist, based in London
- Golam Mustafa, film actor
- Suborna Mustafa, actress
- Shahriar Nafees, Bangladeshi cricketer
- Jahangir Kabir Nanak, Awami League politician
- Abu Zafar Obaidullah, poet
- Shahjahan Omar, Bangladesh Nationalist Party politician
- Andaleeve Rahman, president of Bangladesh Jatiya Party
- Bazlur Rahman, editor, writer
- Selima Rahman, Bangladesh Nationalist Party politician
- Sohel Rana, Bangladeshi film actor, director and producer.
- Nasreen Jahan Ratna, Member of Parliament
- Sudhir Ray, Indian politician
- Amal Kumar Raychaudhuri, physicist
- Tapan Raychaudhuri, historian
- Kamini Roy, poet and first woman graduate with honours in the subcontinent.
- Mir Sabbir, actor
- Hanif Sanket, TV presenter, entertainer, writer and producer
- Golam Sarwar, journalist, writer and the founding editor of Samakal and Jugantor
- Papia Sarwar, Bangladeshi singer
- Delwar Hossain Sayeedi, Bangladeshi Islamic scholar, speaker and politician
- Manikuntala Sen, revolutionary
- Nikhil Sen, dramatist
- Mihir Sengupta, writer
- Abdur Rab Serniabat, cabinet minister, brother-in-law of Sheikh Mujibur Rahman
- Kaliprasanna Vidyaratna, scholar of Sanskrit

== Sources ==
Census figures for 1991, 2001 and 2011 are from Bangladesh Bureau of Statistics, Population Census Wing. The 2011 Census figures are based on preliminary results.
