= Rakudia =

Rakudia রাকুদিয়া
- Village
- Location in Bangladesh
- Coordinates: 22°49′N 90°17′E
- Country: Bangladesh
- Division: Barisal Division
- District: Barisal District
- Upazila: Babuganj Upazila

Area
  - Total: 8.72 km^{2} (3.37 sq mi)

Population (2022)
  - Total: 7,273
  - Density: 834/km^{2} (2,160/sq mi)
- Time zone: UTC+6 (Bangladesh Time)

Rakudia is a village in Babuganj Upazila of Barisal District in the Barisal Division of southern-central Bangladesh.

According to the 2022 Census of Bangladesh, Rakudia had 1,765 households and a population of 7,273. It has a total area of 8.72 km^{2} (3.37 sq mi).
