= Agarpur =

Agarpur আগরপুর
- Village
- Location in Bangladesh
- Coordinates: 22°47′N 90°17′E
- Country: Bangladesh
- Division: Barisal Division
- District: Barisal District
- Upazila: Babuganj Upazila

Area
  - Total: 1.48 km^{2} (0.57 sq mi)

Population (2022)
  - Total: 2,080
  - Density: 1,410/km^{2} (3,640/sq mi)
- Time zone: UTC+6 (Bangladesh Time)

Agarpur is a village in Babuganj Upazila of Barisal District in the Barisal Division of southern-central Bangladesh.

According to the 2022 Census of Bangladesh, Agarpur had 501 households and a population of 2,080. It has a total area of 1.48 km^{2} (0.57 sq mi).
