= Baherchar Khudrakathi =

Baherchar Khudrakathi বহেরচর ক্ষুদ্রকাঠি
- Village
- Location in Bangladesh
- Coordinates: 22°50′N 90°18′E
- Country: Bangladesh
- Division: Barisal Division
- District: Barisal District
- Upazila: Babuganj Upazila

Area
  - Total: 2.81 km^{2} (1.08 sq mi)

Population (2022)
  - Total: 2,415
  - Density: 859/km^{2} (2,230/sq mi)
- Time zone: UTC+6 (Bangladesh Time)

Baherchar Khudrakathi is a village in Babuganj Upazila of Barisal District in the Barisal Division of southern-central Bangladesh.

According to the 2022 Census of Bangladesh, Baherchar Khudrakathi had 623 households and a population of 2,415. It has a total area of 2.81 km^{2} (1.08 sq mi).
