= Uttara Group =

Uttara Group may refer to

- Uttara Group of Companies, holding company of Uttara Motors Limited
- Uttara Group of Industries, trading company founded by Giridhari Lal Modi, a Marwari businessman
