= ONE Bank =

Bangladeshi commercial bank

ONE Bank PLC
- Type: Public limited company
- Industry: Banking
- Founded: Dhaka, Bangladesh
- Headquarters: Dhaka, Bangladesh
- Key people: Mr. A.S.M. Shahidullah Khan (Chairman); Muhit Rahman (Managing Director)
- Products: Banking services Consumer Banking; Corporate Banking; Investment Banking; Islamic Banking
- Net income: ▲
- Website: www.onebank.com.bd

ONE Bank PLC (OBPLC) (Bengali: ওয়ান ব্যাংক) is a public limited commercial bank in Bangladesh. It is in the business of taking deposits from public through various saving schemes and lending the fund in various sectors at a higher margin. A.S.M. Shahidullah Khan is chairman and Mr. Muhit Rahman is the managing director of One Bank PLC.

HRC Group Chairman, Late Sayeed Hossain Chowdhury, previously served as the chairman of the Bank.

== History ==
ONE Bank Limited started its activities in Bangladesh from May 1999. The Board of Directors consists of 6 members. Former Chief of Bangladesh Navy, Admiral AMM Mohammad Aurangzeb Chowdhury, is an independent director of One Bank Limited.

In January 2003, Bangladesh Bank fired the managing director of One Bank Limited, Mirza Ejaj Ahmed, for having links with Hundi accounts of Uttara Group of Industries and Doel Group.

On 21 November 2004, One Bank signed an agreement with the Central Depository Bangladesh Limited to convert paper shares into electronic shares. It purchased 40 million BDT worth of shares in Vanik Bangladesh Limited. Vanik Bangladesh was later renamed to LankaBangla Finance Limited with Mohammad A Moyeen as its chairman. It was established by Vanik Incorporation Limited of Sri Lanka with Bangladesh partners. Sampath Bank and Chinkara Capital (Singapore) Pte Ltd were partners in the venture as well.

In September 2007, Bangladesh Bank warned One Bank Limited for hiring a former managing director of the bank as a consultant violating banking rules. In April 2008, One Bank Limited decided to increase its authorised capital to five billion BDT following instructions from Bangladesh Bank to all banks to increase their authorised capital. One Bank Limited launched a one billion BDT mutual fund in June 2009.

Farman R Chowdhury, managing director of One Bank Limited, signed an agreement with the Joint Secretary of Local Government Division, Shamima Nargis, and director of Digital Bangladesh, Md Nazrul Islam Khan, to establish mobile banking at the 4,501 Union Information Service Centres of Bangladesh in 2012. One Bank saw its shares decline in February 2016. One Bank saw its chairman, Sayeed H Chowdhury, reelected for another term in June 2018.

Sayeed H Chowdhury was reelected chairman of One Bank in August 2019. One Bank limited announced in September to launch 4 billion BDT in bonds. In June, Zahur Ullah, was appointed vice-chairman of One Bank Limited. On 23 December 2021, Md Monzur Mofiz was appointed managing director of One Bank Limited.

In July 2020, Bangladesh Bank has removed HRC Group Chairman Sayeed Hossain Chowdhury from the post of chairman of One Bank over loan delinquency on a loan from Standard Bank. Sayeed Hossain Chowdhury is brother of Saber Hossain Chowdhury, Awami League politician and member of Parliament. In June, the Bank had 19.54 billion BDT in bad loans accounting for 9.63 per cent of all loans of the bank. In November, Bangladesh Bank appointed Md Shazzad Hossoin, an official of Bangladesh Bank, to one bank as an observer.

One Bank reduced their CEO pay following decline in profit in 2021. In September 2022, One Bank received International Organisation for Standardisation for information security management. In 2023, the bank changed its name to ONE Bank PLC.

== Board of directors ==
Name	Position	Reference
A.S.M. Shahidullah Khan	Chairman	
Zahur Ullah	Vice-chairman	
Kazi Rukunuddin Ahmed	Director	
Shawket Jaman	Director	
Anannya Das Gupta	Director	
Aurangzeb Chowdhury	Independent Director	
Md. Monzur Mofiz	Managing Director	
