= Committee for Civil Liberties and Legal Aid =

Bangladeshi think tank and organization

Committee for Civil Liberties and Legal Aid, abbreviated as the Civil Liberties Committee, was a forum in Bangladesh formed by the members of civil society to restore the civil liberties and provide legal aid to the dissenting population of the country who were the victims of Jatiya Rakkhi Bahini. Headed by the eminent poet Sikandar Abu Zafar, the committee consisted a total of 33 members.

The forum was launched on 31 March 1974 through a press briefing at the National Press Club of capital city Dhaka. The committee was highly critical to the government and many of its member were either arrested of were compelled to go underground.

== Background ==
After the Liberation War of Bangladesh, Awami League formed the government ignoring the call from most of the political parties to form a government of national consensus. Soon after consolidating power, Awami League government established a new paramilitary force Jatiya Rakkhi Bahini in March 1972 which was blamed for crushing anti-government protests brutally and getting engaged in deadly confrontations with the opposition parties.

=== Political killing ===
By 1973, according to President of Jatiyo Samajtantrik Dal (Jasad) Major M. A. Jalil, the number of politically motivated murders reached 2000. Among the prominent politicians Jasad Vice-President Mosharraf Hossain, Jasad supported Krishak League leader Siddiq Master, Manikganj Jasad Joint Secretary Sadat Hossain Badal, Jahangirnagar University Central Students' Union general secretary Borhanuddin Rokon were killed.

An 18-year-old boy, Shahjahan Sharif, from Naria upazila of Faridpur went missing from the Rakkhi Bahini custody in January 1974. His disappearance prompted his family to petition the court for a writ of habeas corpus. Justice Debesh Bhattacharya, after hearing both parties, said in his verdict:

the irregular and very unsatisfactory manner of the handling of the matter by the Rakkhi Bahini has created a situation which urgently calls for an effective action on the part of the authorities to clear the cloud and create a sense of assurance in the mind of the people.

=== Special Powers Act, 1974 ===
In February 1974, the parliament passed the Special Powers Act 1974 to make provisions for preventive detentions.

Section 3 of the Special Powers Act provided for preventive detentions. A person was to be detained if the government was satisfied that it was necessary to do so.

=== Ramna massacre ===
See also 1974 Ramna massacre

Jasad called for a meeting to protest the authoritarian rule of the government on 17 March 1974. The meeting was followed by a march to surround the resident of Home Minister Muhammad Mansur Ali after the rally which subsequently went violent.

The incident claimed at least fifty lives when the Jatiya Rakkhi Bahini was called on and eventually opened fire targeting the protesters.

Thousands of cases were filed against Jasad politicians. A. S. M. Abdur Rab, Shajahan Siraj and almost all the bigwigs of the party landed in jail. The Jatiya Rakkhi Bahini started a drive to hunt down all the supporters of Jasad after that. Police and Jatiya Rakkhi Bahini personnel raided the office of Ganakantha and arrested the editor, Al Mahmud.

== Key personnel ==
The committee was formed with 33 members of civil society. They were from different background that included teachers, engineers, lawyers, doctors, writers, poets and journalists.

The first meeting of the committee was held at the National Press Club in Dhaka on 31 March 1974 and was presided over by Professor Ahmed Sharif.

The prominent figures of the committee are:

- Sikandar Abu Zafar as President
- Mirza Ghulam Hafiz in charge of Legal analysis
- Professor Ahmed Sharif in charge of Publication
- Vinod Das Gupta in charge of Investigation
- Abdul Huq in charge of Legal aid
- A.Z.M. Enayetullah Khan as Treasurer
- Moudud Ahmed as general secretary
- Syed Zafar as Assistant general secretary
- Jasimuddin
- Badruddin Umar
- Muhammad Habibur Rahman
- Ahmed Sofa
- Mohiuddin Alamgir
- Kamrunnahar Laili

== Demands ==
In their first meeting, the committee made the following demands:

1. Withdrawal of laws not consistent with the constitution and termination of attack on fundamental rights by the various government forces and administrative machineries
2. Immediate repeal of the undemocratic Special Powers Act
3. Repeal of the Rakkhi Bahini Act and withdrawal of the troops who were all engaged in brutal activities
4. Release of all political prisoners detained in different jails of the country
5. Restoration of freedom of the press and release of all newspaper workers, including Al Mahmud, editor of the daily Ganakantha, and withdrawal of warrants against those wanted by the government for political reasons

== Activities ==
The committee was vocal against the repression of the government and the offences of the government forces. Several meetings and dialogues were held under the banner of the committee.

One of the most discussed event of the committee was a large public meeting which was held in front of Baitul Mukarram National Mosque in Dhaka to express solidarity with the suffering people. The committee held the Awami League responsible for the Bangladesh famine of 1974.

Veteran journalist and a member of the committee, A.Z.M. Enayetullah Khan, was highly critical to the government excesses in handling of the opposition parties and dissenting groups and wrote a series of editorials against the government. He was subsequently arrested for his articles. General Secretary of the committee Moudud Ahmed was also arrested for being critical to the government and providing legal aid to the victims of government agencies.

Ahmed Sofa was chased by Sheikh Mujibur Rahman's son Sheikh Kamal in New Market area of Dhaka for criticising the government. He later went into hiding at Comilla BARD.

== See also ==
- Centre for Policy Dialogue
- Centre for Law and Mediation (Bangladesh)
- Odhikar
