= Sadek Khan =

Bangladeshi journalist and filmmaker

- Born: 21 June 1933; Munshiganj District, Bengal Presidency, British India
- Died: 16 May 2016 (aged 82); Dhaka, Bangladesh
- Occupations: journalist, columnist, filmmaker
- Spouse: Anjuman Chowdhury Khan
- Children: Kishon Khan
- Father: Abdul Jabbar Khan
- Relatives: Selima Rahman (sister); A.Z.M. Enayetullah Khan (brother); Abu Zafar Obaidullah (brother); Rashed Khan Menon (brother); Mr Alan Khan (brother); Sultan M. Khan (brother)

Sadek Khan (21 June 1933 – 16 May 2016) was a Bangladeshi journalist, columnist and filmmaker. In 2002, he was awarded Ekushey Padak by the Government of Bangladesh.

== Personal life ==
Khan was the eldest son of justice Abdul Jabbar Khan, former speaker of the then Pakistan National Assembly and former president of East Pakistan Muslim League. His ancestors were from Baherchar-Khudrakathi village, Babuganj Upazila, Barisal District. His siblings include former government minister and politician Selima Rahman, poet Abu Zafar Obaidullah, journalist and government minister A.Z.M. Enayetullah Khan, government minister Rashed Khan Menon, Architect Sultan M. Khan, Alan Khan, a photographer in Sydney, and New Age news publisher Shahidullah Khan Badal.

Khan was married to Anjuman Chowdhury Khan. Together they had a son Kishon Khan.

== Career ==
Khan was a Language Movement activist in 1952 and a freedom fighter of Bangladesh Liberation War in 1971. He worked as a sub-editor in the Daily Sangbad during 1955–1957. He served as contributing editor in the Weekly Holiday. He served as the chairman of the Press Institute of Bangladesh. He spoke against forming a war crimes tribunal in Bangladesh in November 2007.

Khan worked in the film industry. He directed and produced the film Nadi O Nari (The River and the Women, 1965). Film critic Ahmed Muztaba Zamal, when asked by Cinemaya in 2000 to select the top ten films from Bangladesh, named Nadi O Nari, made when the country was still East Pakistan, as one of the top twelve. He also directed the 1965 Urdu film Kaise Kahun. Khan acted in the Urdu film Duur Hay Shukh Ki Gaon directed by A. J. Kardar and the 1964 Bengali film Raja Elo Shohore directed by Mohiuddin.

== Death ==
Sadek died on 16 May 2016, aged 83, after falling ill at his residence in Baridhara in the capital. He was taken to a private hospital, where he was pronounced dead.
