= Uttara Finance and Investments Limited =

Non-bank financial institution

- Industry: Financial services
- Founded: 1995; 31 years ago
- Headquarters: Dhaka, Bangladesh
- Website: uttarafinance.com

Uttara Finance and Investments Limited, also known as UFIL, is a major non-bank financial institution in Bangladesh. is the chairman of Uttara Finance and Investments Limited. It is owned by the owners of Uttara Group of Companies.

The former managing director of Uttara Finance and Investments Limited, SM Shamsul Arefin, was removed by Bangladesh Bank over financial irregularities. Following a Bangladesh Bank investigation which found evidence of a 51 billion BDT scam.

== History ==
Uttara Finance and Investments Limited was established on 7 May 1995.

On 31 August and 7 September 1977, Uttara Finance and Investments Limited listed on the Chittagong Stock Exchange and Dhaka Stock Exchange respectively.

In May 2005, Uttara Finance and Investments Limited announced a 15 per cent cash dividend and a 10 per cent stock dividend for the 2004 financial year. The next year it provided a 25 per cent cash dividend.

On 14 July 2011, Uttara Finance and Investments Limited opened a branch in Bogra.

Uttara Finance and Investments Limited announced a 10 per cent stock dividend and 20 per cent cash dividend for the 2012 fiscal year.

In 2018, Uttara Finance and Investments Limited purchased 9.41 per cent shares of Beka Garments and Textiles which nearly collapsed by 2023. The Bangladesh Export Processing Zones Authority found production closed and called for the auction of the factory due to non-payment of rent. The Business Standard could not reach its chairman Micky Diaz who had raised 600 million BDT by selling shares of the company.

Bangladesh Bank began an investigation into Uttara Finance and Investments Limited in 2020. In 2021, Dhaka Tribune reported Uttara Finance and Investments Limited was providing depositors money as loans to companies owned by directors of Uttara Finance and Investments Limited.

Bangladesh Bank removed the managing director of Uttara Finance, SM Shamsul Arefin, on 23 June over irregularities and the asked the financial institution to begin legal proceedings against him. Uttara Finance asked the Anti-Corruption Commission to prevent SM Shamsul Arefin from leaving the country. Bangladesh Bank dissolved the board of directors of Uttara Finance and Investments Limited on 28 December 2022 after it found 51 billion BDT in irregular transactions. The majority of the irregular loans, not recorded in public statements, went to various subsidiaries of Uttara Group of Industries, which was owned by the directors of Uttara Finance and Investments Limited. It found the involvement of Mujibur Rahman, director of Uttara Finance and Investments Limited and managing director of a number of subsidiaries of Uttara Group of Industries. Fake deposits receipts worth 2.36 billion BDT were created under the name of Bluechip Securities; Mujibur Rahman was the managing director of Bluechip Securities. Bangladesh Bank had sought a list of directors of Uttara Finance from Bangladesh Securities and Exchange Commission in November. Bangladesh Bank removed chairman of the board of directors of Uttara Finance Rashidul Hasan and Vice Chairman Matiur Rahman. It also removed board members Kazi Imdad Hossain, Nayeemur Rahman, and Zakia Rahman. Dhaka Metropolitan Senior Special Judge, Md Asaduzzaman, issued a travel ban against them, Mohammad Mainuddin, and Anil Chandra Das following a petition of the Anti-Corruption Commission. The Bangladesh Securities and Exchange Commission appointed 12 independent directors to Uttara Finance and Investments Limited including Major General Mohammad Maksudur Rahman as chairman.

In February 2023, Justice Khizir Ahmed Choudhury of Bangladesh High Court rejected a petition by SM Shamsul Arefin, former chairman of Uttara Finance and Investments Limited, seeking the dissolution of Uttara Finance and Investments Limited.
