= LankaBangla Finance PLC =

Non-banking financial company in Bangladesh

LankaBangla Finance PLC.
- Formation: 1997
- Headquarters: Dhaka, Bangladesh
- Official language: Bengali
- Website: www.lankabangla.com

LankaBangla Finance PLC. is a licensed non-banking financial company in Bangladesh. Mohammad A. Moyeen is the chairman of LankaBangla Finance Limited. Humaira Azam is the CEO and managing director of LankaBangla Finance PLC.

== History ==
LankaBangla Finance Limited was established in 1997 as a non-banking financial institution by Vanik Incorporation Limited of Sri Lanka and some Bangladeshi investors (HRC Group). It was originally named Vanik Bangladesh Limited but was renamed to LankaBangla Finance Limited in 2003. Sampath Bank and One Bank Limited purchased shares in 2003.

In 2005, LankaBangla Finance Limited launched LankaBangla Finance MasterCard replacing the old Vanik Card which was launched in 1998. In May 2007, it provided a 10 per cent cash dividend.

In 2010, the company was planning to go public with LankaBangla Securities Limited. Mohammed Nasir Uddin Chowdhury was appointed managing director of LankaBangla Finance Limited on 4 December 2011.

On 1 June 2017, Khwaja Shahriar was appointed managing director of LankaBangla Finance Limited.

LankaBangla Finance Limited increased their profit by 14.35 per cent in 2019 despite the liquidity crises in the financial market of Bangladesh. It received US$20 million from the Islamic Corporation for the Development of the Private Sector. In June 2020, it declared a 12 per cent dividend.

In 2022, LankaBangla Finance Limited signed memorandum of understanding with Rangs Limited. It signed an agreement with Nagad in June. LankaBangla Securities was the top stock broker for 16 years at Dhaka Stock Exchange and 15 years at the Chittagong Stock Exchange consecutively. LankaBangla Securities Limited thanked chairman of Bangladesh Securities and Exchange Commission Shibli Rubayat-Ul-Islam for approving TradeXpress of LankaBangla, a broker hosted OMS. It had 4.35 billion BDT in classified loans in 2022. Government Pension Fund of Norway invested US$1.76 million in LankaBangla Finance.

In 2023, LankaBangla Finance Limited signed an agreement with Trust Axiata Pay (TAP).

== Subsidiaries ==
- LankaBangla Securities Limited
- LankaBangla Investments
- LankaBangla Asset Management Company
- LankaBangla Foundation

== Board of directors ==
Name	Position	Nationality	Reference
Mohammad A. Moyeen	Chairman	Bangladeshi	
I. W. Senanayake	Director	Sri Lankan	
Nanda Fernando	Director	Sri Lankan	
Mahbubul Anam	Director	Bangladeshi	
Tahsinul Huque	Director	British	
Aneesha Mahial Kundanmal	Director	Bangladeshi	
Zaitun Sayef	Independent Director	Bangladeshi	
M. Fakhrul Alam	Independent Director	Bangladeshi	
Humaira Azam	CEO and Managing Director	Bangladeshi	
