= Abdul Karim Sahitya Bisharad =

Bengali writer

- আবদুল করিম সাহিত্যবিশারদ
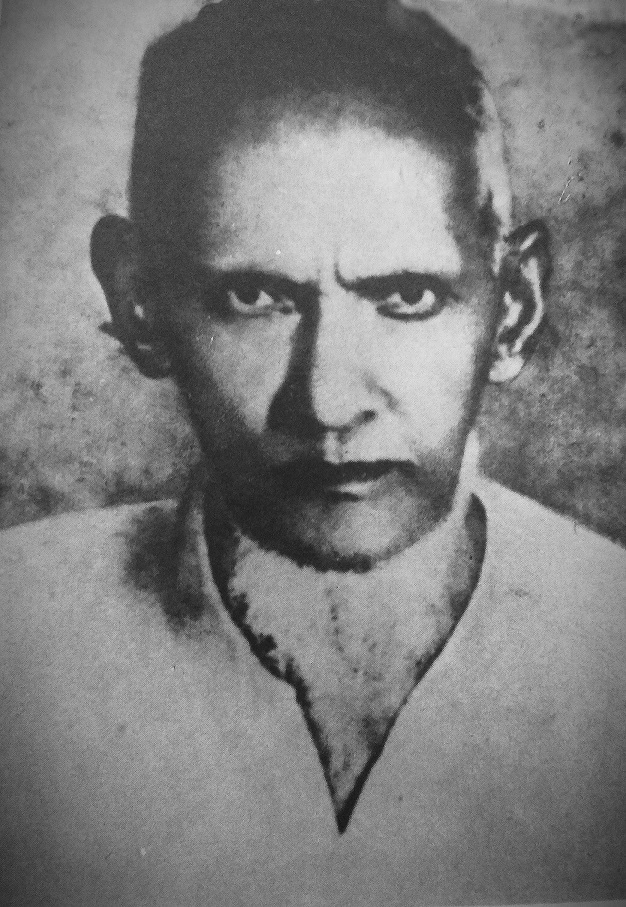
- Born: c. 1871; Suchakradandi, Chittagong District, Bengal Presidency
- Died: 1953 (aged 81–82); East Bengal, Pakistan
- Occupation: Writer
- Relatives: Ahmed Sharif (nephew)

Munshi Abdul Karim (11 October 1871 – 1953), known as Abdul Karim Sahitya Bisharad, was a Bengali littérateur, historian of Bangla literature and collector and interpreter of old Bangla manuscripts.

== Early life ==
Munshi Abdul Karim was born on 11 October 1871 to an upper middle class Bengali family of Muslim Malla-Sheikhs in the village of Suchakradandi in Patiya, Chittagong District, Bengal Presidency (now in Bangladesh). His father, Munshi Nuruddin, died before his birth and his mother, Misrijan, died when he was seventeen years old. His paternal family were descended from Habilas Malla, who served as a soldier under the Sultan of Bengal. After suffering injuries in a battle, he retired to Chittagong, settling in the village of Habilas Dwip. Karim's paternal grandfather, Muhammad Nabi Chowdhury, was the grandson of Sufi poet Dost Muhammad Abdul Qadir Raja, who migrated from Habilas Dwip to the nearby village of Suchakradandi. His maternal grandfather, Musharraf Ali, was a descendant of Daulat Hamzah, the Pathan tarafdar of Hulain near Habilas Dwip.

Abdul Karim passed his Entrance examination in 1893 from Patiya High School. He served as a teacher in few schools. He later joined the office of the Divisional Commissioner of Chittagong and became Divisional Inspector of schools. He retired from the position in 1934.

== Literary career ==
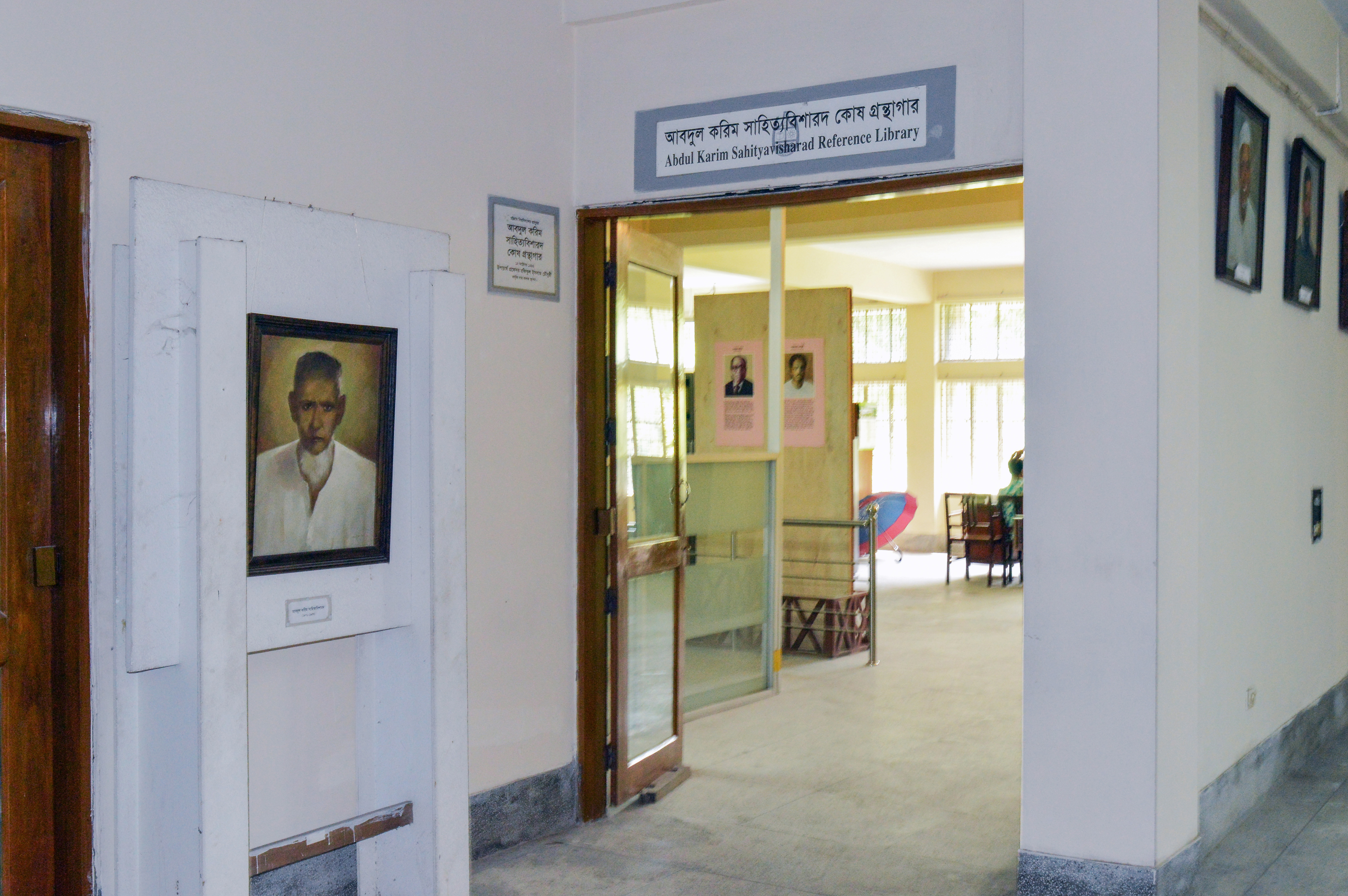
Abdul Karim Sahitya Bisharad Reference Library at Chittagong University Museum

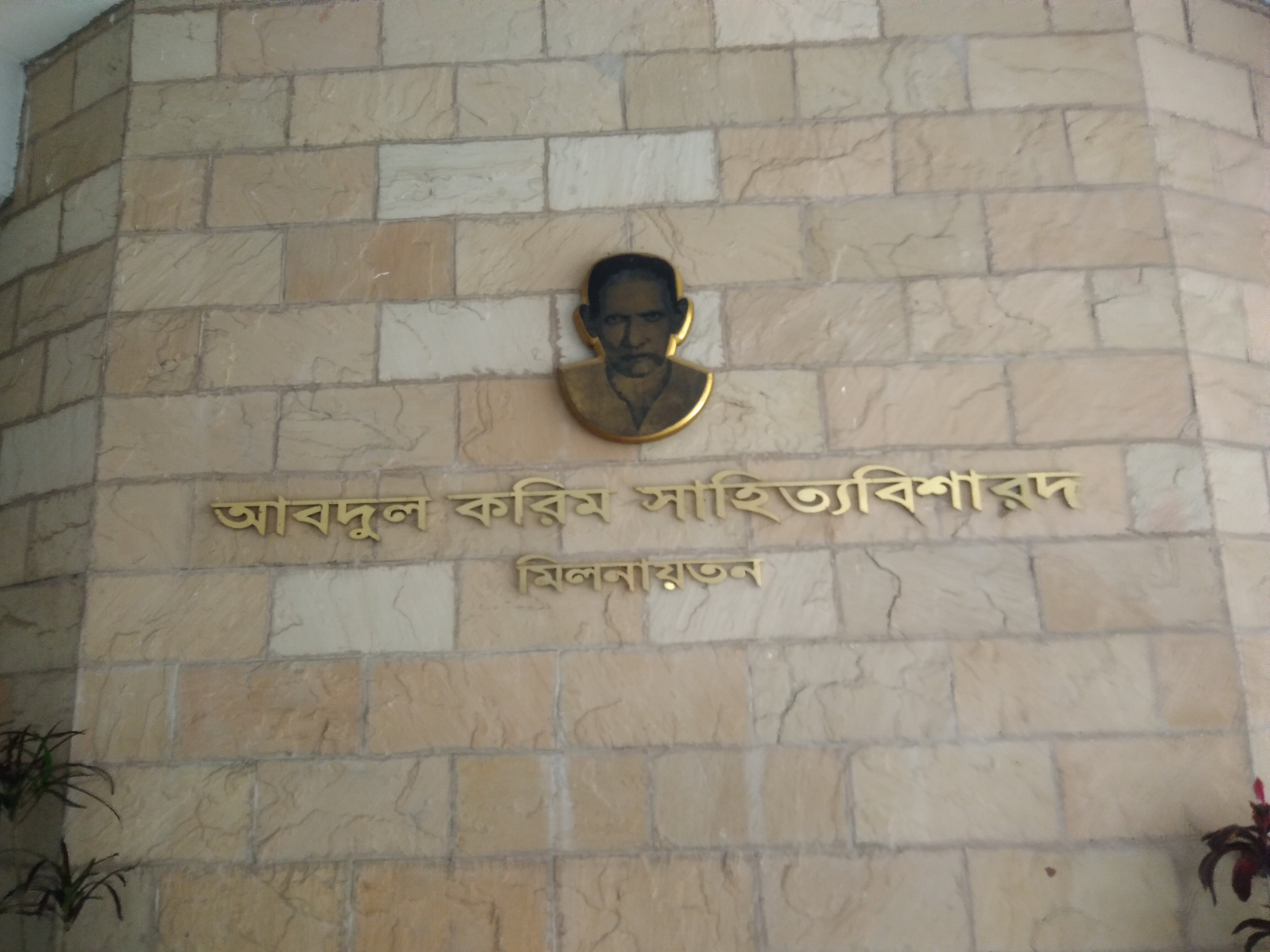
Abdul Karim Sahitya Bisharad Auditorium in Bangla Academy

Abdul Karim was given title called "Sahitya Bisharod" which means literary expert. He had a special research interest in Muslim contribution to Bengali Literature in the medieval period. He collected puthis (old Bangla manuscripts). The Bangiya Sahitya Parisad published his catalog of Bengali manuscripts titled Bangala Prachin Puthir Bivaran in two volumes in 1920–21. The Department of Bengali of the University of Dhaka published a catalog of the manuscripts preserved in the University Library under the title Puthi Parichiti.

Karim edited and published eleven old Bengali texts and a book on the history and culture of Chittagong, titled Islamabad. Daulat Qazi, Alaol, Syed Sultan and Muhamad Khan were notable Bengali poets. Karim discovered about a hundred Muslim poets whose names and works were not known before.

Literary Association of Nadia honored him with the title of Sahitya Sagar and Chattal Dharmamandali Sabha gave him the title of Sahitya Visharad.

== Personal life ==
Abdul Karim married Badi-un-Nesa, and they had a daughter named Altaf-un-Nesa.

== Legacy ==
The Government of Bangladesh conferred Independence Day Award to Karim posthumously in 1995.
