= Lutfun Nesa Khan =

Bangladeshi politician

- লুৎফুন্নেসা খাঁ

Member of 11th Jatiya Sangsad of Reserved Seats for Women
- In office 16 February 2019 – 10 January 2024

Personal details
- Born: 19 August 1946 (age 79)
- Party: Workers Party of Bangladesh
- Spouse: Rashed Khan Menon
- Occupation: Politician

Lutfun Nesa Khan (Bengali: লুৎফুন্নেসা খাঁ, Bengali pronunciation: [lut̪fun nesa kʰã]; born 19 August 1946) is a Workers Party of Bangladesh politician. She was elected as a member of 11th Jatiya Sangsad of Reserved Seats for Women.
