= HRC Group =

Bangladeshi industrial conglomerate (e. 1991)

- Company type: Private
- Industry: Conglomerate
- Founded: 14 March 1991
- Founder: Sayeed Hossain Chowdhury
- Headquarters: Dhaka, Bangladesh
- Key people: Sayeed Hossain Chowdhury (Group Chairman).
- Products: Media, real-estate, IT, manufacturing, finance, shipping
- Number of employees: 3000+ (2022)
- Website: www.hrcbd.com

HRC Group is a Bangladeshi industrial conglomerate. The industries under this conglomerate include media, agriproducts, tea, real estate, finance, and shipping.

== Latest update ==
Sayeed Hossain Chowdhury died on July 15, 2025, his three sons Halif Raees Chowdhury, Hameem Raees Chowdhury and Haziq Raees Chowdhury now run HRC group.

== History ==
The group was established on 14 March 1991 as a Shipping Agency for Chittagong and Mongla ports by entrepreneur Sayeed Hossain Chowdhury. Since then it has expanded to more than 20 subsidiaries.

On 10 December 1998, two security guards of the group were killed during the robbery at the HRC Group headquarters in Karwan Bazar, Dhaka.

In July 2008, the chairperson of the group, Sayeed Hossain Chowdhury, was arrested by joint forces on charges of money laundering and tax evasion. He received bail on 28 August 2008.

In July 2020, Sayeed Hossain Chowdhury, the chairperson of the HRC Group, was removed from his position as chairperson of One Bank Limited by Bangladesh Bank due to the subsidiaries of HRC Group defaulting on loans from various banks.

== List of companies ==
Shipping and logistics

- HRC Shipping Limited
- HRC Freight Limited
- HRC Travels Limited
- Travel Wise Limited
- Arkan Express Limited

Media

- Jaijaidin - Daily Bengali newspaper
- Protichitra - Weekly Bengali newspaper
- New Age- English daily newspaper
- Holiday Weekly English newspaper

Real estate

- HRC Properties Ltd.
- Hamid Properties Limited

Agro-products

- HRC Dairies Limited
- HRC Agrocom
- HRC Land Limited (Clevedon Tea Estate and Dildarpur Tea Estate)
- HRC Products Limited producing Clevedon, Clone, and Premier branded tea.

Manufacturing

- HRC Lighting Limited
- HRC Lamps Limited

IT

- Information Services Network Limited, which was the first Bangladeshi Private ISP as Bangla.net

Finance

- ONE Bank
- LankaBangla Finance PLC.
- Bangladesh General Insurance Company Limited
- National Housing Finance and Housing Limited

== See also ==
- List of companies of Bangladesh
