= Ahmed Sharif =

Educationist, philosopher, critic, writer and scholar of medieval Bengali literature

- আহমদ শরীফ
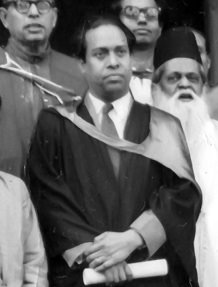
- Sharif in a graduation ceremony
- Born: 13 February 1921; Patiya, Chittagong, Bengal Presidency, British India
- Died: 24 February 1999 (aged 78); Dhaka, Bangladesh
- Education: Ph.D. in Bengali literature
- Alma mater: University of Dhaka
- Spouse: Saleha Mahmud
- Relatives: Abdul Karim Sahitya Bisharad (Uncle)
- Writing career
- Notable awards: full list
- Movement: Anti-establishment

Ahmed Sharif (13 February 1921 – 24 February 1999) was an educationist, philosopher, critic, writer and scholar of medieval Bengali literature. He is recognized as one of the most outspoken atheists and radical thinkers of Bangladesh.

== Biography ==
Ahmed Sharif was born on 13 February 1921 in Patiya, Chittagong District, Bangladesh. His father was Abdul Aziz, and his uncle, Abdul Karim Sahitya Bisharad, was a renowned historian and a leading figure in Bengali literature. Sharif was raised in an environment surrounded by rare manuscripts and literary journals collected by his uncle, which significantly influenced his intellectual growth.

He pursued his master's in Bengali literature from the University of Dhaka in 1944 and obtained his Ph.D. from the same university in 1967.

He was an active member of the Committee for Civil Liberties and Legal Aid, which was established in March 1974 to protect opposition politicians and members of civil society whose civil liberties were being violated by the Awami League government. He and Lt. Colonel Kazi Nuruzzaman led the Muktijuddha Chetana Bikash Kendra (Centre for the Development of the Spirit of the Liberation War), a group of left-leaning intellectuals who spoke out against the dictatorship of Hussain Muhammad Ershad.

== Career ==
Sharif's professional journey began in 1944 when he joined the Anti-Corruption Department as a Grievance Officer, earning a salary of 250 Taka. However, he left this position soon after due to ethical disagreements. In 1945, he shifted to academia, beginning as a lecturer at Laksam Nawab Faizunnessa College, where he worked until 1948 with a salary of just 115 Taka. He then moved to Feni Degree College, teaching there until June 1949.

=== Academic tenure at the University of Dhaka ===
In 1950, Ahmed Sharif joined the University of Dhaka as the institution's first research assistant in the Bengali Department. His appointment came with a unique condition: Sharif had to donate Abdul Karim Sahitya Bisharad's extensive manuscript collection to the university at no cost, in exchange for the responsibility of preserving the collection.From 1952 to 1953, served as a temporary lecturer in the Bengali Department, and in 1957, he was officially appointed as a lecturer. By 1962, he was teaching part-time in the Journalism Department and, in 1963, joined the University of Dhaka Library Section in addition to his teaching role. Sharif was elected chairman of the Bengali Department in 1969 and continued in this position until his retirement on 31 October 1983. He had a 36-year-long association with the University of Dhaka. During his career, he was elected dean of the Faculty of Arts multiple times. On February 1, 1984, he joined the University of Chittagong as the esteemed "Nazrul Professor" and served in that position until February 1985.

== Literary contributions ==
Ahmed Sharif's upbringing amidst Abdul Karim Sahitya Bisharad's invaluable collection of manuscripts and periodicals shaped his literary pursuits. He devoted his life to researching and documenting the literary and social history of medieval Bengali society, producing analytical and historically grounded works that remain crucial to Bengali literary scholarship. Through his extensive research and detailed analyses, Sharif provided a comprehensive overview of medieval Bengali society and culture, making significant contributions to understanding the era.

Sharif authored and edited over a hundred books. His first edited work, "Layli Majnu", was published in 1957, based on a manuscript by Daulat Wazir Bahram Khan. In 1959, his first original work, Bichitra Chinta (Diverse Thoughts), was released, which marked the beginning of his career as a prolific writer and scholar.

Sharif taught about medieval Bengali literature and regularly gave insights into the history of Bengal, the Bangladesh Liberation War and Rabindranath Tagore.

== Philosophy ==
Ahmed Sharif's philosophical outlook was an amalgamation of idealism, humanism, and Marxism. These elements were deeply reflected in his thoughts, beliefs, actions, and literary works. Throughout his career, Sharif authored over a hundred books and essays, wherein he strongly rejected the prevailing social systems, beliefs, and superstitions with powerful arguments. He was also a staunch advocate for establishing a socialist society. From the 1950s until the late 1990s, Sharif wrote extensively on various topics, including society, literature, culture, politics, philosophy, and history.

He remains a revered figure among revolutionary social changemakers due to his critical perspectives and his critique of established social structures. His body of work not only discusses human socio-economic and political liberation but also the emancipation of East Pakistan (now Bangladesh) from the oppressive regime of West Pakistan.

== Association with the "Nucleus" ==
During the 1960s, Ahmed Sharif was closely associated with the "Nucleus" (also known as the Swadhin Bangla Biplobi Parishad), a secret organization formed under the leadership of Sirajul Alam Khan, who was a theoretical leader of the East Pakistan Students League. The "Nucleus" aimed to achieve the liberation of East Pakistan and transform it into an independent Bangladesh. His famous 1965 essay, "Itihasher Dharay Bangali", mentioned the term "Bangladesh" as well as the lyrics of the iconic song "Amar Shonar Bangla, Ami Tomay Bhalobashi" which later became the national anthem of Bangladesh.

Sharif's advocacy for the independence of Bangladesh and his involvement in the intellectual and political discourse surrounding it continued throughout his life. From the pre-independence period to his death, he actively participated, both individually and collectively, in various crises and movements to safeguard freedom and democracy.

== Legacy ==
In the fields of South Asian literature, culture, and politics, Ahmed Sharif was a distinguished scholar, a secular rationalist, a philosopher, and a progressive humanist. His non-conformist views and commitment to free thinking made him a unique bearer of rationalist and humanist ideologies. Sharif's works continue to inspire and guide those striving for social justice, secularism, and liberation in Bangladesh and beyond.

=== Dr. Ahmed Sharif Memorial Award ===
The Swadesh Chinta Sangha, an organization established by Ahmed Sharif, has instituted the "Dr. Ahmed Sharif Memorial Lecture and Award." This award is conferred annually in his memory .

== Death ==
In 1995, Ahmed Sharif made a will bequeathing his posthumous body and eyes. He believed that “eyes are the finest organs and blood is the symbol of life. Hence, it is more desirable to use the entire body for human welfare rather than leaving it to decay in the grave.” Accordingly, after his death, his body was donated to Dhaka Medical College for the benefit of medical students and educational purposes.

== Awards ==
- Bangla Academy Literary Award (1968)
- Dawood Prize for Literature
- Ekushey Padak (1991)
