= Rashed Khan Menon =

Bangladeshi politician (born 1943)

- রাশেদ খান মেনন
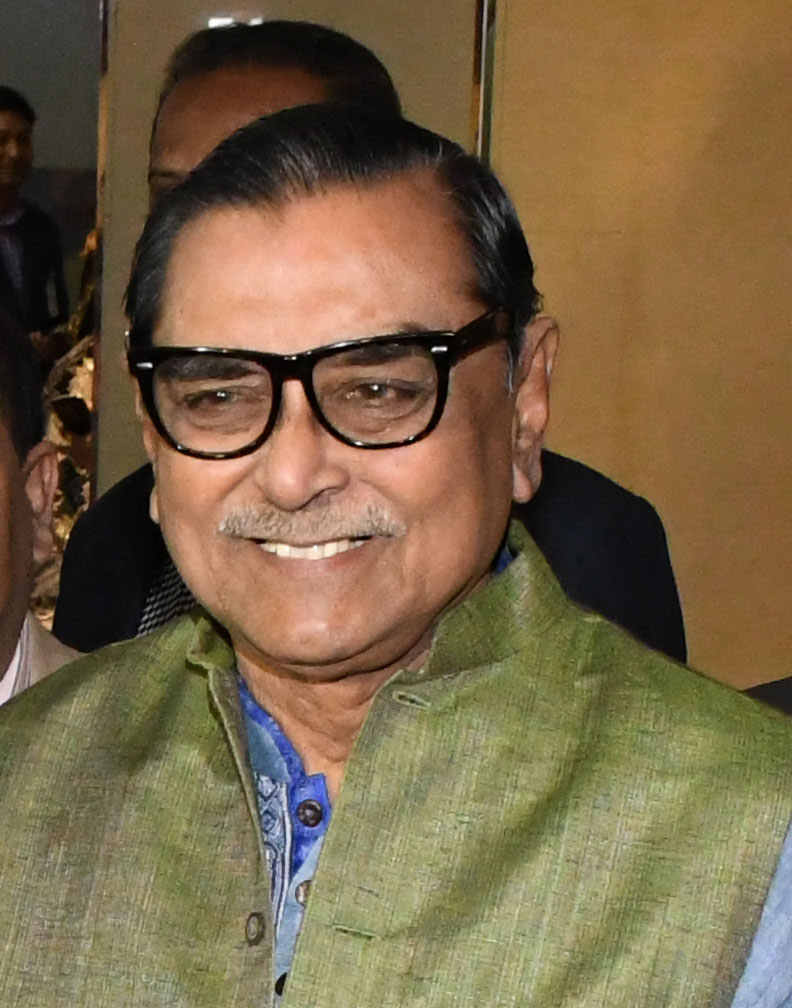
- Menon in 2020

Member of Bangladesh Parliament
- In office 30 January 2024 – 6 August 2024
- Preceded by: Shah-e-Alam
- Constituency: Barisal-2
- In office 25 January 2009 – 29 January 2024
- Preceded by: Nasiruddin Ahmed Pintu
- Succeeded by: AFM Bahauddin Nasim
- Constituency: Dhaka-8
- In office 5 March 1991 – 24 November 1995
- Preceded by: Syed Azizul Huq
- Succeeded by: Golam Faruque Ovi
- Constituency: Barisal-2

Minister of Social Welfare
- In office 3 January 2018 – 7 January 2019
- Prime Minister: Sheikh Hasina
- Preceded by: Geetiara Safya Chowdhury
- Succeeded by: Nuruzzaman Ahmed

Minister of Civil Aviation and Tourism
- In office 14 January 2014 – 3 January 2018
- Prime Minister: Sheikh Hasina
- Preceded by: Faruk Khan
- Succeeded by: A.K.M. Shahjahan Kamal

Personal details
- Born: 18 May 1943 (age 83) Faridpur, Bengal Presidency, British India
- Party: Workers Party of Bangladesh
- Other political affiliations: National Awami Party (Bhashani)
- Spouse: Lutfun Nessa Khan
- Parent: Abdul Jabbar Khan (father)
- Relatives: Sadek Khan (brother); Enayetullah Khan (brother); Selima Rahman (sister); Abu Zafar Obaidullah (brother)
- Education: Dhaka College University of Dhaka
- Occupation: Politician

Rashed Khan Menon (born 18 May 1943) was a Bangladeshi politician. He was the president of Workers Party of Bangladesh and a former Jatiya Sangsad member representing the Barisal-2 and Dhaka-8 constituencies. He was the chairman of the Parliamentary Standing Committee of the Ministry of Education. Earlier, he served as the Minister for Civil Aviation and Tourism.

== Early life ==
Menon was born in Faridpur. He studied at Dhaka Collegiate School, finish in 1958. In 1960, he passed intermediate in arts group from Dhaka College. He graduated from Dhaka University in 1963 with a degree in economics. In 1964, he received his master's degree.

In the late 1960s, Menon was president of the East Pakistan Students Union faction linked to the National Awami Party of Maulana Bhasani. However, he differed with Maulana Bhasani when the latter accepted participation in elections in January 1970. Menon's East Pakistan Student Union launched a campaign against elections, stating that they would be merely a facade of democracy, that fair elections could not be held under martial law and that the situation was ripe for revolution. He built a revolutionary Maoist organisation along with Kazi Zafar Ahmed. The Menon-Zafar group built a base in Khulna (in Begerhat), amongst workers near Dacca and had a student group named Revolutionary Students Union.

Menon contested the 1973 Bangladeshi parliamentary election as a NAP (Bhasani) candidate. He did not win any seat, and afterward he complained that the Awami League government had used unfair methods to win the election.

== Career ==
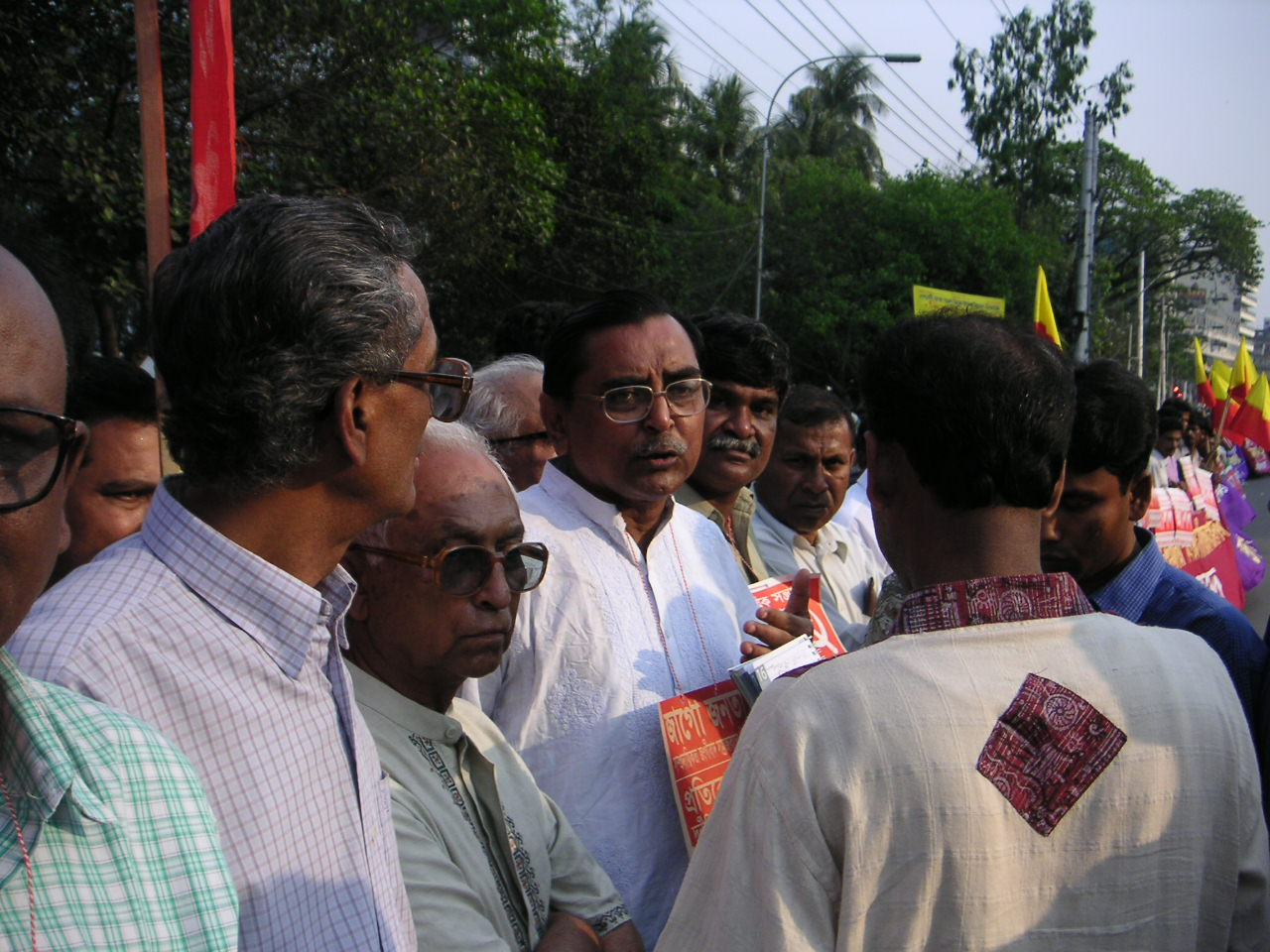
Menon at an opposition rally in Dhaka, 2005

Menon was elected to parliament in 1979. In 1990, he played a leading role in the mass struggle that toppled the Hossain Mohammad Ershad regime. In 1991, he was again elected to parliament. In 1991, he, as a Workers Party of Bangladesh parliamentarian, submitted four demands for constitutional amendments in the parliament. These demands and others were submitted to a 15-member constitutional review committee, in which he was included. After 29 meetings, the committee submitted a unanimous report to the parliament.

On 17 August 1992, Menon survived a violent near-fatal attack. Unidentified assailants opened fire on the Workers Party office, injuring Menon.

Bangladesh Workers' Party of Menon joined the 14-party alliance led by Awami League and participated in the 2008 national election. They also participated in the 2014 national election which was boycotted by the main opposition party BNP. Menon was appointed the minister of civil aviation and tourism. Menon, once rose a strong voice against authoritarian West Pakistani regime.

On 22 August 2024, after the fall of the Sheikh Hasina, Menon was arrested from Gulshan area in Dhaka. While attending a hearing both Menon and Hasanul Haq Inu were assaulted by lawyers at the court premises. The Anti-Corruption Commission investigated allegations that Menon had accumulated 25000 crore BDT (2.5 Billion USD) worth of wealth through corruption. By June, he had spent 36 days in remand. He had been charged in multiple cases over the death of protestors against former Prime Minister Sheikh Hasina.

== Family ==
Menon's father, Abdul Jabbar Khan, hailed from Khudrakathi village, in Babuganj Upazila, Barisal. Menon is closely related to several prominent Bangladeshi personalities. His father was the speaker of the Pakistani National Assembly. His siblings include journalist and columnist Sadek Khan, architect Sultan M. Khan, Alan Khan, a photographer in Sydney, poet Abu Zafar Obaidullah, former minister Selima Rahman, journalist and ambassador to Burma Enayetullah Khan and the publisher of New Age Shahidullah Khan Badal.

Menon is married to Lutfun Nessa Khan. She is elected as a Jatiya Sangsad member at the 11th Parliament from the reserved women's seat-48 representing the Workers Party of Bangladesh.
