= Babuganj Upazila =

Babuganj বাবুগঞ্জ
- Upazila
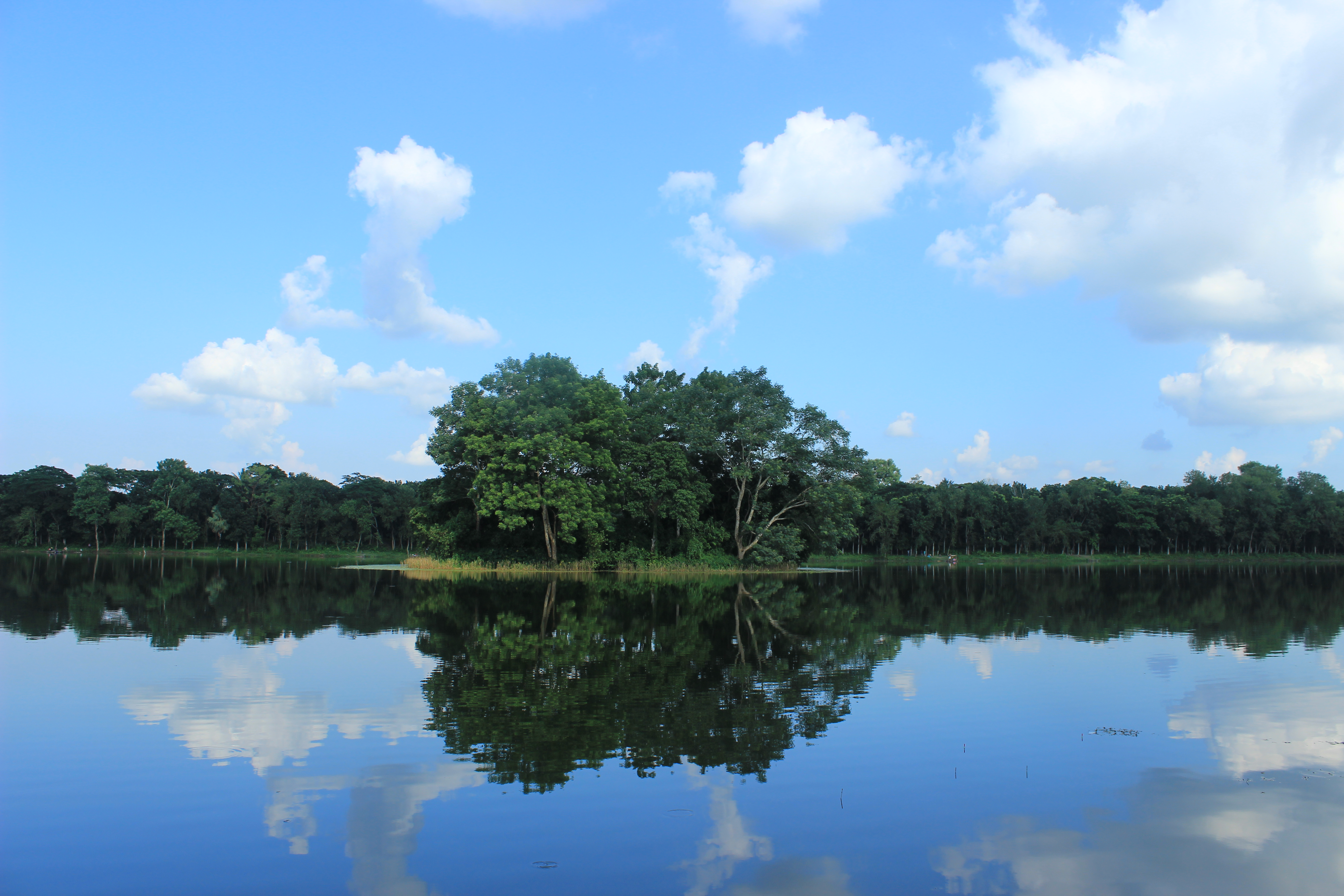
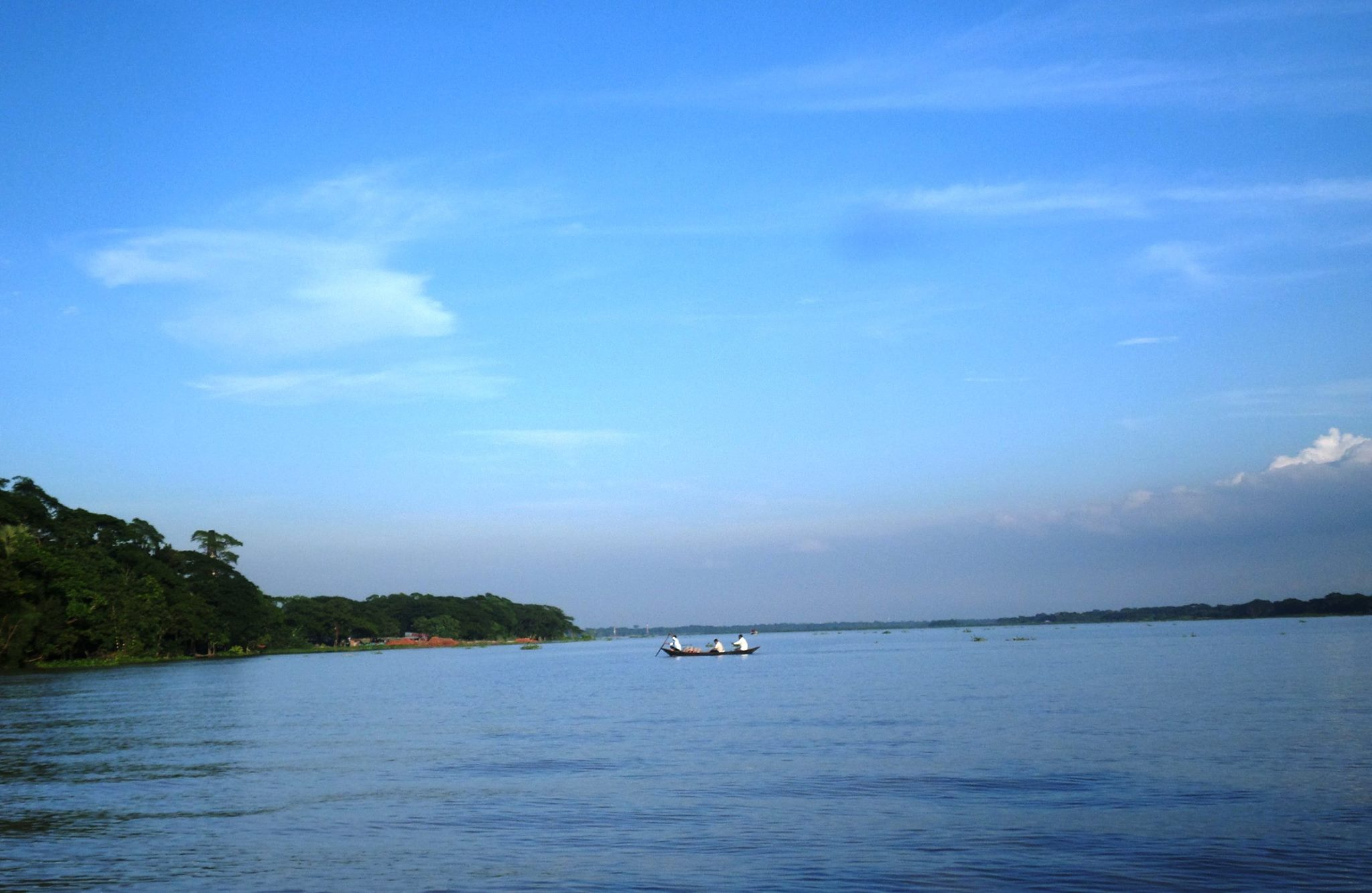
- Durga Sagar, Sondha River

- Coordinates: 22°49.9′N 90°19.3′E
- Country: Bangladesh
- Division: Barisal
- District: Barisal
- Headquarters: Babuganj

Area
  - Total: 164.88 km^{2} (63.66 sq mi)

Population (2022)
  - Total: 154,558
  - Density: 937.40/km^{2} (2,427.8/sq mi)
- Time zone: UTC+6 (BST)
- Postal code: 8210
- Area code: 04327
- Website: babuganj.barisal.gov.bd

Babuganj (Bengali: বাবুগঞ্জ) is an administrative unit of Barisal District in the Division of Barisal, Bangladesh.

== Geography ==
Babuganj is located at 22.8319°N 90.3222°E. It has a total area of 164.88 km^{2}.

== Demographics ==
Historical population
Year	Pop. (000)	±%
1981	131	—
1991	136	+3.8%
2001	146	+7.4%
2011	140	−4.1%
2022	155	+10.7%
Source: Bangladesh Bureau of Statistics

Religions in Babuganj Upazila (2022)
Religion	Percent
Islam	95.07%
Hinduism	4.77%
Other or not stated	0.16%

According to the 2022 Bangladeshi census, Babuganj Upazila had 37,997 households and a population of 154,558. 9.31% of the population were under 5 years of age. Babuganj had a literacy rate (age 7 and over) of 81.09%: 81.95% for males and 80.33% for females, and a sex ratio of 90.58 males for every 100 females. 19,904 (12.88%) lived in urban areas.

According to the 2011 Census of Bangladesh, Babuganj Upazila had 31,663 households and a population of 140,361. 29,468 (20.99%) were under 10 years of age. Babuganj had a literacy rate (age 7 and over) of 68.83%, compared to the national average of 51.8%, and a sex ratio of 1077 females per 1000 males. 9,847 (7.02%) lived in urban areas.

== Points of interest ==
=== Durgasagar ===
Durgasagar, with an area of about 2,500 hectare, is the largest pond or dighi of southern Bangladesh. It is located at Madhabpasa village of Babuganj upazila, about 11 km away from Barisal town. Locally it is known as Madhabpasha Dighi. According to a desire of Rani Durgavati, mother of Raja Joynarayan, the dighi was dug in 1780 (1187 BS).

=== Educational institutions ===
The faculty of animal science and veterinary medicine of Patuakhali Science and Technology University is situated at Khanpura, Babuganj.

== Administration ==
UNO: Shakila Rahman.

Babuganj Upazila is divided into six union parishads: Chandpasha, Dehergati, Jahangir Nagar, Kedarpur, Madhabpasha, and Rahmatpur. The union parishads are subdivided into 81 mauzas and 90 villages.

== Maps ==
- "Babuganj Upzilla". Prime Minister's Office Library. Archived from the original on 2018-06-12.

== Notable people ==
- Kirtinarayan Basu, 17th-century Raja of Chandradwip who converted to Islam
- Abdul Wahab Khan (1898–1972), 3rd Speaker of the National Assembly of Pakistan
- Abdul Jabbar Khan (1902–1984), 6th Speaker of the National Assembly of Pakistan
- Sadek Khan (1933–2016), journalist, columnist and filmmaker
- Abu Zafar Mohammad Obaidullah Khan (1934–2001), poet and civil servant
- A.Z.M. Enayetullah Khan (1939–2005), journalist and government minister
- Rashed Khan Menon (born 1943), government minister
- Selima Rahman, politician
- Fakhrul Amin Khan, father of Sal Khan known as founder of Khan Academy
