= Abdul Jabbar Khan (speaker) =

Pakistani politician

- আব্দুল জব্বার খাঁন

4th Speaker of the National Assembly
- In office 12 June 1965 – 25 March 1969
- Deputy: Fazal Ilahi Chaudhry
- Preceded by: Fazlul Qadir Chaudhry
- Succeeded by: Zulfikar Ali Bhutto

Acting President of Pakistan
- In office 12 June 1965 – 25 June 1965
- President: Ayub Khan
- Preceded by: Ayub Khan
- Succeeded by: Ayub Khan
- In office 25 March 1969 – 25 March 1969
- President: Ayub Khan
- Preceded by: Ayub Khan
- Succeeded by: Ayub Khan

Personal details
- Born: 1 January 1902 Baherchar, Backergunge District, Bengal Presidency
- Died: 23 April 1984 (aged 82) Gulshan Dhaka, Bangladesh
- Party: Convention Muslim League (1962–1969)
- Other political affiliations: Muslim League (before 1962)
- Children: 7, including: Sadek Khan; A.Z.M. Enayetullah Khan; Selima Rahman; Rashed Khan Menon; Abu Zafar Obaidullah
- Parent: Kajal Khan (father)
- Education: University of Dhaka

Justice Abdul Jabbar Khan (Bengali: আব্দুল জব্বার খাঁন; 1 January 1902 – 23 April 1984) was a Bangladeshi judge and civil servant. He was the 6th Speaker of the National Assembly of Pakistan. He was preceded by Fazlul Qadir Chaudhry.

== Early life ==
He was born on 1 January 1902 in the village of Baherchar in Babuganj, then part of the Backergunge District of the Bengal Presidency. Khan completed his matriculation from Barisal Zilla School in 1919 and completed his Intermediate of Arts from Brojomohun College two years later. He earned his Bachelor of Arts (honours) degree in Arabic from the University of Dacca. He received his Master of Arts in Arabic from the same university in 1925. After that, he completed his Bachelor of Laws degree in 1927.

== Career ==
In 1929, he joined the judicial branch of the Bengal Civil Service. In his career he served as the subordinate judge, additional district judge and district judge and a justice of the Dhaka High Court. He retired from the judiciary to enter politics in 1962. He started his political career with the Convention Muslim League, and in 1964 he was made the president of the East Pakistan wing of the Muslim League. In 1965 he was elected to the National Assembly of Pakistan from Barisal. He went on to be elected Speaker of the National Assembly and remained in that post until 1969.

He served as acting president on several occasions. On resigning in 1969, President Ayub Khan did not hand over power to him but instead abrogated the constitution and invited General Yahya Khan to declare martial law, leading to the creation of Bangladesh.

He established various religious and educational institutions such as the Gulshan Central Masjid, Baherchar Kajal Khan High School (named after his father), Gouranadi College, and Gugandia Abul Kalam College. He also played a part in the founding of the Sher-e-Bangla Medical College.

Justice Feroz Nana was father of Ms Anita Ghulam Ali while Justice Mushtaq Ali Kazi was father in law of Justice Agha Rafiq Khan former Chief Justice of the Federal Shariat Court.

== Acting President of Pakistan ==
Abdul Jabbar Khan was the acting president of Pakistan from 1965 to 1965, when President Ayub Khan went abroad for medical treatment. He resigned to join politics in 1962 and got elected as MNA and was speaker of the National Assembly from 1965 to 1969. He served as acting president on several occasions. On resigning in 1969.

== Death ==
He died on 23 April 1984 in Gulshan, Dhaka, Bangladesh. His children include journalists A.Z.M. Enayetullah Khan, Sadek Khan; poet Abu Zafar Obaidullah, politicians Selima Rahman, Rashed Khan Menon; Architect Sultan M. Khan, Sydney based photographer Alan Khan, and the publisher of New Age Shahidullah Khan Badal.

Political offices
Preceded by Fazlul Qadir Chaudhry	Speaker of the National Assembly; 1965–1969	Succeeded by Zulfikar Ali Bhutto
