= Holiday (newspaper) =

Weekly publication

- Type: Weekly newspaper
- Format: Broadsheet
- Owner(s): Holiday Publications Limited
- Founder(s): A.Z.M. Enayetullah Khan
- Publisher: Holiday Publications Limited
- Editor: Sayed Kamaluddin
- Founded: August 1, 1965; 60 years ago
- Language: English
- Headquarters: 30, Tejgaon Industrial Area, Dhaka, Bangladesh
- Website: weeklyholiday.net

Holiday is an independent English-language newsweekly published on Fridays in Bangladesh. Founded by the late eminent journalist Enayetullah Khan in 1965, it was one of the most influential newspapers in East Pakistan and was known for its outspoken stance against successive Pakistani regimes. In newly independent Bangladesh, it was a staunch critic of the regime of Sheikh Mujibur Rahman and was briefly banned in 1975. Since the 1990s, the paper has seen significant decline in circulation. It is now owned by HRC Group which is owned by Saber Hossain Chowdhury, an Awami League member of parliament.
