= Selima Rahman =

Bangladeshi politician

- সেলিমা রহমান
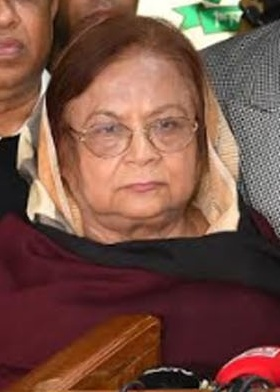
- Rahman in 2018

Minister of State for Cultural Affairs
- In office 10 October 2001 – 28 October 2006
- Prime Minister: Khaleda Zia
- Preceded by: Rokia Afzal Rahman
- Succeeded by: C. M. Shafi Sami

Member of the Bangladesh Parliament for Reserved Women's Seat-27
- In office 10 October 2001 – 28 October 2006
- Preceded by: Panna Kaiser
- Succeeded by: Rubi Rahman

Member of the Bangladesh Parliament for Reserved Women's Seat-1
- Incumbent
- Assumed office 3 May 2026

Personal details
- Party: Bangladesh Nationalist Party
- Parent: Abdul Jabbar Khan (father)
- Relatives: Sadek Khan (brother); A.Z.M. Enayetullah Khan (brother); Abu Zafar Obaidullah (brother); Rashed Khan Menon (brother)

Selima Rahman is a Bangladesh Nationalist Party (BNP) politician and the incumbent Jatiya Sangsad member for reserved women's seat. She also served as a minister of state at the Ministry of Cultural Affairs of the government of Bangladesh and Member of Parliament from 2001 to 2006.

== Background ==
Rahman is the daughter of justice Abdul Jabbar Khan, a former speaker of the Pakistan National Assembly. Her siblings include journalist and columnist Sadek Khan, poet Abu Zafar Obaidullah, journalist and government minister A.Z.M. Enayetullah Khan, government minister Rashed Khan Menon, architect Sultan M. Khan, photographer Allen Khan and the publisher of New Age, Shahidullah Khan Badal.

== Career ==
Rahman served as the joint secretary general and vice-chairman of the BNP.

Rahman was arrested several times during her political career — in April 2012 under section 54 of the Criminal Procedure Code, in December 2013, in January 2014 for the Ramna Police Station arson case, in August 2015 for assaulting police and in September 2016 for an arson attack on a bus.

In 2026, she was elected for the reserved womens seat in the Jatiya Sangsad.
