= Uttara Group of Industries =

Bangladeshi diversified conglomerate

- Formation: 1972
- Headquarters: Dhaka, Bangladesh
- Region served: Bangladesh
- Official language: Bengali
- Website: gemcongroup.com

Uttara Group of Industries (Bengali: উত্তরা গ্রুপ অব ইন্ডাস্ট্রিজ) is a Bangladeshi diversified conglomerate based in Dhaka founded by Giridhari Lal Modi, a Marwari businessman.

== History ==
Uttara Group of Industries was founded by Giridhari Lal Modi. He is from a Marwari family, an ethnic group from Rajasthan specializing in business.

In 2003, an investigation by Bangladesh Bank found that Dhaka Bank Limited, National Bank Limited, National Credit and Commerce Bank Limited, and One Bank Limited had failed to prevent money laundering by Giridhari Lal Modi, Uttara Group, Om Prakash Agarwal, Ashok Kejriwal, and Doel Group. Bangladesh Bank then suspended the managing director of Dhaka Bank Limited, Mokhlesur Rahman, the managing director of National Credit and Commerce Bank Limited, Anwar Ahmed, and the managing director of One Bank Limited, Mirza Ejaj Ahmed. Bangladesh Bank found that the group violated the law by not bringing the revenue to Bangladesh of their textile exports. The investigation into the accounts showed links to hundi business. It also found loans worth 3.3 billion BDT were given by these banks to Uttara Group and Doel Group violation the banking rules of Bangladesh.

The group in March purchased Nabarun Jute Mill, a state owned jute mill, from the government of Bangladesh 139.6 million BDT, after making the lowest bid in 1998. In October 2005, Additional Superintendent of Police in the Dhaka District Police Amjad Hossain and the officer in charge of Savar Police Station, Tariq Kamal, were suspended for allegedly tying to steal 180 million BDT from Uttara Group. Sub-Inspector Ibrahim Khalil was suspended and sent to jail while Sub-Inspector Aminul Islam had gone into hiding to evade arrest. Additional Superintendent Ashiq Sayeed of Savar Upazila was placed under investigation over the same issue. Second officer of the Savar Police Station, Shawkat Ali, sued two police officers and five police sources over seizing the money, 23.8 million BDT, from an official of Uttara Group who was travelling to Dhaka on the excuse of investigating hundi links of Uttara Group. Some of the money was later returned.

In March 2007, the caretaker government created a list of individuals to be targeted in a corruption drive which include the name of the chairman of Uttara Group of Industries, Giridhari Lal Modi. The police questioned Giridhari Lal Modi on allegations of laundering 34 million BDT to the United States. Modi was detained by the police in May. He was produced by the police before Bangladesh High Court advisory board, composed of two judges and one joint secretary from the Ministry of Home Affairs, along with Bangladesh Nationalist Party vice chairman Tarique Rahman to decide whether to extend their decision. In July, Modi was asked to submit a wealth statement by the Anti Corruption Commission.

The National Board of Revenue sued four directors of Uttara Spinning Mill, including Dilip Kumar Modi, on charges of tax evasion in 2008. The National Board of Revenue froze the bank accounts of Giridhari Lal Modi. The Anti Corruption Commission sued Giridhari Lal Modi. Modi secured bail from Bangladesh High Court in July 2008. The finance minister of Bangladesh, Abul Maal Abdul Muhith, said in January 2009, the government was to decide what to do with the frozen accounts, including that of Modi, after the National Board of Revenue sought ministry advice. The government ordered some to be unfrozen.

The Anti Corruption Commission asked for the accounts of Giridhari Lal Modi in February 2015.

The Central Intelligence Cell of the National Board of Revenue asked for the accounts of Dilip Kumar Modi, son of Giridhari Lal Modi and managing director of Uttara Group.

== Businesses ==
- Uttara Spinning Mill
- Six Seasons Food & Beverages Limited (Terra Bite, Party, and Thai-chi)
- Uttara Traders (Pvt) Limited
- Nabarun Jute Mill
- Uttara Jute Mills
- Uttara Jute Fibres and Industries Limited
