= Uttara Group of Companies =

Uttara Group of Industries
- Formation: 1973
- Headquarters: Dhaka, Bangladesh
- Region served: Bangladesh
- Official language: Bengali

Uttara Group of Industries (Bengali: উত্তরা গ্রুপ অব কোম্পানিজ) is a Bangladeshi diversified conglomerate based in Dhaka. Matiur Rahman, president of the president of Bangladesh Motorcycle Manufacturers and Assemblers Association, is the chairman and managing director of Uttara Group of Industries.

Uttara Motors Limited, the flagship of the group, is the official distributor of Asia MotorWorks, Bajaj Auto, Force Motors, Isuzu, Maruti Suzuki, Pak Suzuki Motor Corporation Limited, Suzuki Indomobil Motor, SML Isuzu, and Suzuki in Bangladesh.

== History ==
Uttara Group of Industries traces its origins to Uttara Motors Limited, the flagship of the group, founded in 1972 by Mukhlesur Rahman.

In October 2010, Mujibur Rahman, deputy managing director of Uttara Group of Companies, was elected chairman of the Eastern Insurance Company Limited.

In August 2014, Uttara Group announced plans to build a 1.5 billion BDT factory to build Bajaj motorcycles. It owns 11 per cent of IPDC Finance.

In June 2021, the Deputy Managing Director, Mehdadur Rahman Durand, died in a fire accident that occurred in his home in Gulshan one week ago. The group made a donation to Prime Minister Sheikh Hasina's relief fund.

Ambassador of Japan to Bangladesh, ITO Naoki, gave the Order of the Rising Sun, Gold Rays with Rossete to the chairman of Uttara Group, Matiur Rahman, for his role in Bangladesh-Japan trade in March 2022. Rahman was part of the International Chamber of Commerce Bangladesh delegation to Dubai. The group launched a book on students health written by ASM Waheeduzzaman.

The directors of Uttara Group are also directors of Uttara Finance and Investment Limited. Bangladesh Bank removed them from the board of Uttara Finance an investigation found 51 billion BDT in irregular loans including to the directors and subsidiaries of Uttara Group in December 2022. Uttara Finance asked the Anti-Corruption Commission to prevent SM Shamsul Arefin from leaving the country. Bangladesh Bank dissolved the board of directors of Uttara Finance and Investments Limited on 28 December 2022 after it found 51 billion BDT in irregular transactions. The majority of the irregular loans, not recorded in public statements, went to various subsidiaries of Uttara Group of Industries. It found the involvement of Mujibur Rahman, director of Uttara Finance and Investments Limited and managing director of a number of subsidiaries of Uttara Group of Industries. Fake deposits receipts worth 2.36 billion BDT were created under the name of Bluechip Securities; Mujibur Rahman was the managing director of Bluechip Securities. Bangladesh Bank had sought a list of directors of Uttara Finance from Bangladesh Securities and Exchange Commission in November. Bangladesh Bank removed chairman of the board of directors of Uttara Finance Rashidul Hasan and Vice Chairman Matiur Rahman. It also removed board members Kazi Imdad Hossain, Nayeemur Rahman, and Zakia Rahman. Dhaka Metropolitan Senior Special Judge, Md Asaduzzaman, issued a travel ban against them, Mohammad Mainuddin, and Anil Chandra Das following a petition of the Anti-Corruption Commission. The Bangladesh Securities and Exchange Commission appointed 12 independent directors to Uttara Finance and Investments Limited including Major General Mohammad Maksudur Rahman as chairman.

== Businesses ==
- Uttara Motors Limited
- Uttara Finance and Investment Limited
- Uttara Automobiles Limited
- Uttara Motor Corporation Limited
- Uttara Automobile Manufacturers Limited
- Menoka Motors Limited
- Eastern Motors Limited
- Uttara Services Limited
- Uttara Tyre Retreading Co. Limited.
- Uttara Knitting & Dyeing Limited
- Uttara Knitwears Limited
- Hallmark Pharmaceuticals Limited
- Exchange & Securities Limited
- UGC Securities Limited
- Eastern Capital Limited
- Uttara Hongkong JVC Limited
- Uttara Properties Limited
- The Consolidated Tea & Lands Company (Bangladesh) Limited
- Ramgarh Tea Plantation Limited
- National Life Insurance Company Limited
