= Shamima Nargis =

Retired government senior secretary and chairperson

Shamima Nargis is a retired government senior secretary and chairperson of the Bangladesh Development Bank. She is a former member of the Planning Commission.

== Early life ==
Nargis graduated from the University of Dhaka with a bachelor's and master's in English literature. She received a Hubert H Humphrey Fellowship to study at the University of Minnesota.

== Career ==
Nargis joined the Bangladesh Civil Service in 1988.

In 2010, Nargis was the deputy secretary at the Economic Relations Division at the Ministry of Finance. She then worked at the Local Government Division as a joint secretary.

In July 2015, Nargis was the additional secretary at the Economic Relations Division at the Ministry of Finance. She signed an agreement, titled Efficient and Accountable Local Governance, between the Economic Relations Division and the United Nations Development Programme.

In April 2018, Nargis was promoted to secretary. She was working as the acting secretary at the Planning Commission.

Nargis was promoted in March 2020 to senior secretary. She retired from the civil service in October 2020; she was serving as a member of the Planning Commission.

On 15 November 2021, Nargis was appointed chairperson of Bangladesh Development Bank by the Financial Institutions Division of the Ministry of Finance.
