= Sikandar Abu Zafar =

Bangladeshi writer and poet (1918–1975)

- সিকান্দার আবু জাফর
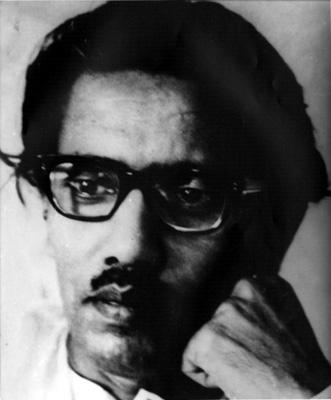
- Sikander Abu Zafar
- Born: 19 March 1918; Tetuliya, Tala, Satkhira, Bengal Presidency, British India
- Died: 5 August 1975 (aged 56); Dhaka, Bangladesh
- Education: Secondary (1936), Tala BD English High School, Khulna (now Satkhira) Intermediate, Ripon College (renamed to Sutendranath College), Calcutta

Sikandar Abu Zafar (19 March 1918 – 5 August 1975) was a Bangladeshi journalist, dramatist, writer and poet. Although primarily a poet, he had a smooth stride in various fields of literature. He was always at the forefront of progressive cultural movements. The monthly literary magazine "Samakal", published for a long time under his editorship, became a meeting place for young writers; a strong platform for intellectual protest and resistance against the then Pakistani misrule. This magazine was banned several times and its published issues were confiscated due to its vocal protest against the then Pakistani military rule.

Sikandar Abu Jafar's educational career began at the then Tala BD English High School in Khulna (now Satkhira). After completing his studies there, he studied at Surendranath College (formerly Ripon College) in Kolkata. After completing his education, he joined various intellectual professions from 1941. After the partition, he moved to East Bengal and served as a staff artist of Radio Pakistan until 1953. He was mainly a journalist. He also had experience working in the magazine "Nabojug" edited by Kazi Nazrul Islam. During the Liberation War, he played a major role in editing and publishing the magazine "Saptahik Ovijhan" from Kolkata.

Sikandar Abu Zafar, the author of famous works such as "Amader Sangram Chalbey" and "Bangla Chhado", was also particularly appreciated as a playwright. Apart from "Sirajuddullah", his other famous plays include "Makdsa" (1960), "Shakunta Upakhyan" (1962) and "Mahakabi Alaol" (1966). In addition to poetry and plays, he has made special achievements in various creative activities including novels and translations.

He was awarded Bangla Academy Literary Award in 1966 (In recognition of his theatrical practice), Ekushey Padak in 1984 and Independence Day Award in 1999 by the government of Bangladesh.

== Early life and education ==
Sikander Abu Zafar passed the secondary education in 1936 from Tala BD English High School in the then Khulna (now Satkhira). He completed his higher secondary (intermediate) from Ripon College, Calcutta (later renamed to Surendranath College).

Sikander Abu Zafar moved to Dhaka from Calcutta after the partition of Indian Subcontinent in 1947 and worked as a journalist for the dailies Nabajug (edited by Kazi Nazrul Islam), Ittefaq, Sangbad and Millat. He founded and edited a monthly literary magazine called Samakal during 1959–1970.

== Literary Works ==
Poetry: 'Prosonno Prohor' (1965), 'Boiri Bristite' (1965), 'Timirattik' (1965), 'Kobita 1372' (1968), 'Brischik Longno' (1971), 'Bangla Chhado' Drama: 'Makdsa' (1960), 'Shakuntu Upakhyan'(1958), 'Siraj-ud-ullah' (1965), 'Mahakhabi Alaol' (1965) Novel: 'Mati ar Ossru' (1942), 'Purobi' (1944) Teenage novels: 'Joyer Pathe' (1942), 'Nabi Kahini' (1951) Translation: 'Rubaiyat Omar Khayyam' (1966), Saint Luis's 'Setu' (1961), Bernard Malamud's 'Jadur Kolos' (1959) Song: 'Mallob Kuoshik' (1966), 'Amader Sangram Cholbe' are this famous song.
