= Abu Zafar Obaidullah =

Bangladeshi poet

- আবু জাফর ওবায়েদুল্লাহ

Minister of Agriculture
- In office 1 August 1982 – 31 May 1984
- President: Hussain Muhammad Ershad
- Preceded by: Fasihuddin Mahtab
- Succeeded by: Abdul Haleem Chowdhury

Minister of Water Resources
- In office 11 February 1982 – 1 June 1984
- President: Hussain Muhammad Ershad
- Preceded by: L. K. Siddiqi
- Succeeded by: M. H. Khan

11th Bangladesh Ambassador to the United States
- In office 8 November 1984 – 10 December 1984
- President: Hussain Muhammad Ershad
- Prime Minister: Ataur Rahman Khan
- Preceded by: Humayun Rashid Choudhury
- Succeeded by: A. H. S. Ataul Karim

Personal details
- Pronunciation: [abu d͡ʒafoɾ obae̯d̪ulːaʱ]
- Born: Abu Zafar Mohammad Obaidullah Khan; 8 February 1934
- Died: 19 March 2001 (aged 67)
- Parent: Abdul Jabbar Khan (father)
- Relatives: Sadek Khan (brother); Enayetullah Khan (brother); Selima Rahman (sister); Rashed Khan Menon (brother)
- Education: University of Dhaka
- Awards: Ekushey Padak (1985); Bangla Academy Literary Award

Abu Zafar Obaidullah (Note: Bengali pronunciation: [abu d͡ʒafoɾ obae̯d̪ulːaʱ].) (Bengali pronunciation: [abu d͡ʒafoɾ obae̯d̪ulːaʱ]; 8 February 1934 – 19 March 2001) was a Bangladeshi poet and civil servant. Two of his long poems, Aami-Kingbodontir-Kathaa Bolchi and Bristi O Shahosi Purush-er Jonyo Prarthona, have become famous since their first publication in the late 1970s.

== Early life and education ==
On 8 February 1934 poet Abu Zafar Mohammad Obaidullah Khan was born in Baherchar-Kshudrakathi village under Babuganj upazila of Barisal District on 8 February 1934, in British India. He was the second son of Justice Abdul Jabbar Khan, a speaker of the Pakistan national assembly. His brothers include journalist Enayetullah Khan and politician Rashed Khan Menon. He received his primary education in Mymensingh town where his father Abdul Jabbar Khan was working as the district judge. In 1948, he passed the matriculation examination from the Mymensingh Zilla School. He passed the Intermediate in Arts examination as a student of the Dhaka College in 1950. He was then admitted into the University of Dhaka to study English and after securing B.A. (Honours) and M.A. degrees, he joined the same university in 1954 as a lecturer in the Department of English. He appeared in the Pakistan Superior Service Examinations and having stood second in the combined national merit list, he joined the Civil Service of Pakistan in 1957.

== Career ==
Obaidullah was promoted as Secretary to the Government of Bangladesh in 1976 and after retiring in 1982, he accepted the position of Minister for Agriculture and Water Resources in 1982. Later he also served as Bangladesh's Ambassador to the United States of America. In 1992, he became the Assistant Director General of FAO Regional Office in Bangkok; he retired from this position four years later.

=== Participation in Language Movement ===
Obaidullah actively participated in the Language Movement of 1952. He composed "Kono Ek Ma-key" ("To a Mother") for the first anthology on Ekushey, which is recited at the Central Shaheed Minar on 21 February every year.

=== Padaboli ===
Obaidullah founded "Padaboli" which became the leading poetry movement of Bangladesh in the 1980s.

Obaidullah was one of the pioneers of the Dhaka-centric group theatre movement that originated in the 1950s. Along with Syed Maksudus Saleheen, Taufiq Aziz Khan and Bazlul Karim he established Drama Circle in 1956.

== Awards ==
- Ekushey Padak (1985)
- Bangla Academy Literary Award (1979)

== Books ==
Poet Hasan Hafizur Rahman published Obaidullah's first compilation of poetry at Saogat Press in 1962. In 1999, the complete poems of Abu Zafar Obaidullah, covering all eight of poetry books of the poet, were compiled in a volume titled "Abu Zafar Obaidullah-er Kabitasamagra".

- Kokhono Rong Kokhono Shoor
- Kamol-er Chokh
- Ami Kingbadontir Katha Bolchhi
- Shohishnu Protikkha
- Brishti Ebong Shahoshi Purush-er Jonyo Prarthona
- Amar Shomoi Amar Shakol Katha
- Khachar Bhitor Ochin Pakhi
- Yellow Sands' Hills: China through Chinese Eyes
- Rural Development – Problems and Prospects
- Creative Development; Food and Faith
- Abu Zafar Obaidullah-er Kabitasamagra

== Death and legacy ==
Obaidullah died on 19 March 2001.

=== Poet Abu Zafar Obaidullah Foundation ===
Poetry lovers of Dhaka established Poet Abu Zafar Obaidullah Foundation in 2002. Currently Arif Nazrul is the Foundation president (2008). Among other regular activities, this foundation gives annual awards to people they view as contributing to the national interest.

Also, "Poet Abu Zafar Obaidullah Smriti Pathagar" (memorial library) was established in Babuganj of Barisal in 2003.
