= A.Z.M. Enayetullah Khan =

Bangladeshi journalist and politician

- এ.জেড.এম. এনায়েতুল্লাহ খান

Ambassador of Bangladesh to Myanmar
- In office 9 November 1987 – 30 November 1989
- Preceded by: Mustafizur Rahman
- Succeeded by: Mostafa Faruk Mohammad

Personal details
- Born: Abu Zafar Mohammad Enayetullah Khan; 25 May 1939 Mymensingh, Bengal Province, British India
- Died: 10 November 2005 (aged 66) Toronto, Canada
- Parent: Abdul Jabbar Khan (father)
- Relatives: Sadek Khan (brother); Selima Rahman (sister); Abu Zafar Obaidullah (brother); Rashed Khan Menon (brother); Fazlur Rahman Khan (brother-in-law)
- Education: Ananda Mohan College
- Awards: Ekushey Padak (2004)

Abu Zafar Mohammad Enayetullah Khan (known as Enayetullah Khan; 25 May 1939 – 10 November 2005) was a Bangladeshi journalist and government minister. He founded the weekly newspaper Holiday and the daily newspaper New Age. He served in Ziaur Rahman's cabinet, first as minister of land administration and land reform from December 1977 to June 1978, and then as minister of petroleum and natural resources from July 1978 to October 1978.

Md. Shaheduzzaman had remarked him as one of the best political writers in South-East Asia.

He was president of the Jatiya Press Club and the Dhaka Club.

== Early life and family ==
Enayetullah Khan was born in Mymensingh, Bengal Province (present-day Bangladesh) on 25 May 1939, the third son of the late Justice Abdul Jabbar Khan, a former speaker of the Pakistan National Assembly. Enayetullah Khan was nicknamed as Mintu.

Khan's siblings include journalist and columnist Sadek Khan, poet Abu Zafar Obaidullah, former minister Selima Rahman, political leader Rashed Khan Menon MP, Architect Sultan M. Khan, Alan Khan, a photographer in Sydney, and the publisher of New Age, Shahidullah Khan Badal. In 1962, he married Masuda Khan Leena, the sister of renowned structural engineer Fazlur Rahman Khan.

== Politics and education ==
Khan was a student of Anand Mohan College. He served as the general secretary of Students' Union of his college. Then he got admitted in University of Dhaka, completed his graduation and attained master's degree in philosophy. While studying in University of Dhaka, he was involved in student politics on behalf of Bangladesh Students' Union and served as the vice-president of Shahidullah Hall section.

He actively participated in the Bengali language movement in 1952. Later on he worked in favour of Bangladesh Liberation War. He joined Farakka Long March Committee with Abdul Hamid Khan Bhashani.

== Life and career ==
Khan started his journalism career in 1959 as a cub reporter with the then Pakistan Observer. Later, he founded the Weekly Holiday in August 1965 and took over as its editor in 1966. Weekly Holiday was critical to the Ayub Khan regime in Pakistan and supported the Mass Upsurge in 1969.

Later, after Independence war Khan was nominated as a member of the search committee to find out the information regarding the deceased intellectuals during Bangladesh Independence War.

Khan was the owner editor of Weekly Holiday, the magazine that played a strong role against the anarchy of Sheikh Mujibur Rahman and published many reports that included full description of atrocities done by the Jatiyo Rakkhi Bahini from 1972 to 1975. He was later detained and Weekly Holiday was banned by Sheikh Mujibur Rahman.

Khan also served as the coordinator of Committee for Civil Liberties and Legal Aid, the organisation that helped the victims of Jatiyo Rakkhi Bahini. When the famine of 1974 started in Bangladesh he formed Famine Resistance Committee and helped the hungry and destitute.

Khan served as the editor of the Bangladesh Times from 1975 to 1977.

Later, Khan served as minister of petroleum and mineral resources in the cabinet of President Ziaur Rahman. Then he was commissioned as the ambassador of Bangladesh to China, North Korea, Cambodia, and Myanmar. He also worked as the President of National Press Club and Dhaka Club.

Khan was in the 1976 Farakka March Committee led by Moulana Bhasani and the Committee Against Communalism in 1981.

Khan served as the minister of land administration and then the minister of petroleum and mineral resources in the then-government of Bangladesh from 1977 to 1978 and as the ambassador to China (1984–1987) and Myanmar (1987–1989).

In 2003, Khan started the publication of the daily newspaper New Age.

== Death ==
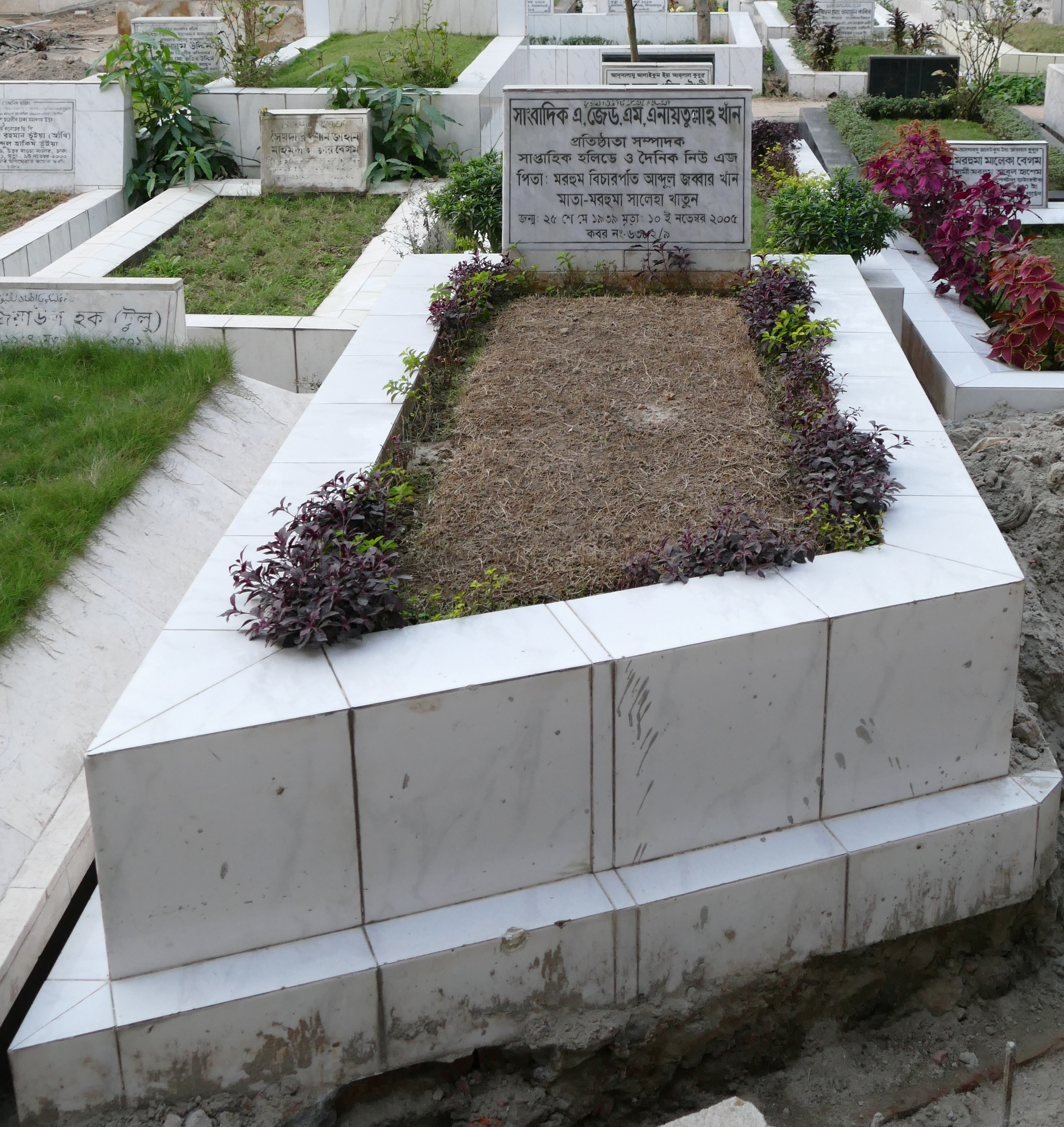
Grave of A.Z.M. Enayetullah Khan at Banani Graveyard

Khan died in Toronto, Canada on 10 November 2005 at the age of 66. He had been suffering from cancer of the pancreas.
