= New Age (Bangladesh) =

Bangladeshi English-language newspaper

- New Age logo
- Type: Daily newspaper
- Format: Broadsheet
- Owner(s): Media New Age Limited, HRC Group
- Founder: A.Z.M. Enayetullah Khan
- Editor: Nurul Kabir
- Founded: 2003
- Language: English
- Headquarters: Hamid Plaza, 3000/5/A/1 Bir Uttam CR Datta Road, Hatirpool, Dhaka-1205
- Website: newagebd.net

New Age is a Bangladeshi English-language daily newspaper published from Dhaka. It is printed in broadsheet. It is one of the country's most outspoken newspapers, regarded for its anti-establishment editorial policy. Nurul Kabir is the present editor of the newspaper.

== History ==
=== Content ===
At one-point, New Age–like its rival, the Daily Star–included a literature page (defunct by mid-2019), which stimulated Bangladesh's English literary scene.

=== Conflicts ===
In 2014, the offices of New Age were searched without a warrant by Bangladesh Police.

In 2009, a New Age reporter was tortured by the law enforcement agency Rapid Action Battalion members.

In 2013, editor Nurul Kabir allegedly received a phone call from a person claiming to be a criminal nicknamed "Shahadat," who threatened him, his wife and children, demanded Tk100,000, and ordered him to "speak carefully" when appearing in talk shows. In response, a group of 50 activists signed a petition calling for an investigation and punishment of the alleged crime.

In 2014, police attempted to search the New Age office, at the Tejgaon area in the capital, without a warrant. Over objections from staff, police entered and videotaped some of the interior. Later, a police official said it was a "misunderstanding" due to a report "that Jamaat-Shibir activists" were "in the area."

In February 2015, police allegedly beat Nazmul Huda Suman, the Dhaka University correspondent for New Age, and a companion, as they returned to the university from the newspaper's office. He alleged that he had photographed some police misconduct, and was promptly surrounded by 20-30 officers, and attacked—on site, in a police car, and at the police station. Friends later rushed him to a hospital where he was examined for head injury. The incident sparked various public protests by political and cultural organizations. The correspondent promptly sued 13 officers of the Ramna police, sparking a court-ordered police investigation.

=== David Bergman issues ===
New Age blogger David Bergman has been a subject of particular controversy. Bergman is the husband of human rights lawyer and activist Sara Hossain, who is daughter of Bangladeshi politician & internationally acclaimed lawyer Kamal Hossain.

In 2014, the controversial International Crimes Tribunal of Bangladesh ordered Bergman to pay a fine of approximately US$65, or serve a week in prison, for questioning the controversial, allegedly exaggerated, official historical record on the actual death toll in Bangladesh's 1971 War of Independence. The court's actions, essentially declaring that its judgments could not be the subject of journalistic inquiry, even after issued, met with international condemnation.

== See also ==
- List of newspapers in Bangladesh
- Daily Sun (Bangladesh)
