= List of unions in Barisal Division =

Barisal Division

This is a list of union councils in the Barisal Division of Bangladesh. Union councils are the smallest government unit, and are partially responsible for agriculture, education, health, infrastructure, and sanitation. They also oversee administrative duties like birth registration, census activities, and maintaining civil status registers. Additionally, they contribute to maintaining law and order in their areas.

== Barguna District ==
=== Amtali Upazila ===
- Amtali Union
- Arpangasia Union
- Athara Gachhia Union
- Chaora Union
- Gulishakhali Union
- Haldia Union
- Kukua Union

=== Bamna Upazila ===
- Bamna Union
- Bukabunia Union
- Dauatola Union
- Ramna Union

=== Barguna Sadar Upazila ===
- Aylapatakata Union
- Barguna Union
- Bodorkhali Union
- Burirchor Union
- Dhalua Union
- Fuljhuri Union
- Gowrichanna Union
- Keorabunia Union
- M. Baliatali Union
- Noltona Union

=== Betagi Upazila ===
- Betagi Union
- Bibichini Union
- Buramazumdar Union
- Hosnabad Union
- Kazirabad Union
- Mokamia Union
- Sarishamuri Union

=== Patharghata Upazila ===
- Charduani Union
- Kakchira Union
- Kalmegha Union
- Kanthaltali Union
- Nachna Para Union
- Patharghata Union
- Raihanpur Union

=== Taltali Upazila ===
- Barabagi Union
- Chhotabagi Union
- Kariibaria Union
- Nishanbaria Union
- Panchakoralia Union
- Sarikkhali Union
- Sonakata Union

== Barishal District ==
=== Agailjhara Upazila ===
- Bagdha Union
- Bakal Union
- Gaila Union
- Rajiher Union
- Ratnapur Union

=== Babuganj Upazila ===
- Chandpasha Union
- Dehergati Union
- Jahangir Nagar Union
- Kedarpur Union
- Madhabpasha Union
- Rahmatpur Union

=== Bakerganj ===
- Bharpasha Union
- Charadi Union
- Char Amaddi Union
- Darial Union
- Dudhal Union
- Durgapasha Union
- Faridpur Union
- Garuria Union
- Kabai Union
- Kalashkati Union
- Nalua Union
- Niamati Union
- Padri Shibpur Union
- Rangasree Union
- Banaripara Union
- Baisari Union

=== Banaripara Upazila ===
- Bisarkandi Union
- Chakhar Union
- Iluhar Union
- Saliabakpur Union
- Saidkati Union
- Udaykati Union

=== Gaurnadi Upazila ===
- Barthi Union
- Batajore Union
- Chandshi Union
- Khanjapur Union
- Mahilara Union
- Nalchira Union
- Sarikal Union

=== Hizla ===
- Bara Jalia Union
- Dhulkhola Union
- Guabaria Union
- Harinathpur Union
- Hizla Gaurabdi Union
- Kuchaipatti Union
- Memania Union

=== Barishal Sadar Upazila ===
- Chandpura Union
- Chandramohan Union
- Char Baria Union
- Char Kowa Union
- Char Monai Union
- Jagua Union
- Kashipur Union
- Roypasha-Karapur Union
- Shayestabad Union
- Tungibaria Union

=== Mehendiganj ===
- Alimabad Union
- Andharmanik Union
- Bhasanchar Union
- Bidyanandapur Union
- Chandpur Union
- Char Ekkaria Union
- Char Gopalpur Union
- Dakshin Ulania Union
- Darichar Khajuria Union
- Gobindapur Union
- Jangalia Union
- Joynagar Union
- Lata Union
- Mehendiganj Union
- Sreepur Union
- Uttar Ulania Union

=== Muladi ===
- Batamara Union
- Char Kalekhan Union
- Gachhua Union
- Kazir Char Union
- Muladi Union
- Nazirpur Union
- Safipur Union

=== Wazirpur ===
- Shikerpur Union
- Bamrail Union
- Barakotha Union
- Guthia Union
- Harta Union
- Jalla Union
- Otra Union
- Satla Union
- Sholak Union

== Bhola District ==
=== Bhola Sadar Upazila ===
- Alinagor Union
- Bapta Union
- Charshamya Union
- Dakshin Digholdi Union
- Dhania Union
- Ilisha Union
- Kachia Union
- Paschim Ilisa Union
- Razapur Union
- Shibpur Union
- Uttar Digholdi Union
- Bheduria Union
- Bhelumia Union

=== Daulatkhan Upazila ===
- Char Khalifa Union
- Charpata Union
- Dakshin Joynagar Union
- Hazipur Union
- Madanpur Union
- Madua Union
- Sayedpur Union
- Uttar Joynagar Union
- Bhabanipur Union

=== Burhanuddin Upazila ===
- Boro Manika Union
- Deula Union
- Gongapur Union
- Hasannogor Union
- Kachia Union
- Kutuba Union
- Pakshia Union
- Sachra Union
- Tobgi Union

=== Char Fasson Upazila ===
- Abubakarpur Union
- Abdullahpur Union
- Aminabad Union
- Aslampur Union
- Awajpur Union
- Char Kolmi Union
- Char Madras Union
- Char Manika Union
- Dhal Char Union
- Hazarigonj Union
- Jahanpur Union
- Jinnaghar Union
- Kukri Mukri Union
- Mujib Nagar Union
- Nazrul Nagar Union
- Nilkamal Union
- Nurabad Union
- Rasulpur Union
- Osmanganj Union

=== Lalmohan Upazila ===
- Badarpur Union
- Charbhuta Union
- Dholigournagar Union
- Farajgonj Union
- Kalma Union
- Lalmohan Union
- Lord Hardinge Union
- Paschim Char Umed Union
- Ramagonj Union

=== Manpura Upazila ===
- Dakshin Sakuchia Union
- Hazirhat Union
- Monpura Union
- Uttar Sakuchia Union

=== Tazumuddin Upazlia ===
- Baro Molongchora Union
- Chanchra Union
- Chadpur Union
- Shambupur Union
- Sonapur Union

== Jhalokati District ==
=== Jhalokati Sadar Upazila ===
- Basanda Union
- Binoykati Union
- Gabkhandhansiri Union
- Gabharamchandrapur Union
- Keora Union
- Kirtipasha Union
- Nabagram Union
- Nathullabad Union
- Ponabalia Union
- Sekherhat Union

=== Kathalia Upazila ===
- Chenchrirampur Union
- Patikhalghata Union
- Amua Union
- Kanthalia Union
- Shaulajalia Union
- Awrabunia Union

=== Nalchity]] ===
- Bhairabpasha Union
- Dapdapia Union
- Kulkati Union
- Kusanghal Union
- Mollahat Union
- Magar Union
- Nachan Mohal Union
- Ranapasha Union
- Siddhakati Union
- Subidpur Union

=== Rajapur ===
- Baraia Union
- Galua Union
- Mathbari Union
- Rajapur Union
- Saturia Union
- Suktagarh Union

== Patuakhali District ==
=== Bauphal Upazila ===
- Adabaria Union
- Bauphal Union
- Boga Union
- Das Para Union
- Dhulia Union
- Kachipara Union
- Kalaiya Union
- Kalishuri Union
- Kanakdia Union
- Keshabpur Union
- Madanpura Union
- Najirpur Union
- Nawmala Union
- Shurjamoni Union

=== Dashmina Upazila ===
- Rangopaldi Union
- Alipur Union
- Betagi Shankipur Union
- Bahrampur Union
- Bashbaria Union
- Char Bohranuddin Union
- Dashmina Sadar Union

=== Galachipa Upazila ===
- Bakulbaria Union
- Amkhola Union
- Char Biswas Union
- Char Kajal Union
- Chiknikandi Union
- Ratandi Taltali Union
- Dakua Union
- Galachipa Union
- Gazalia Union
- Golkhali Union
- Kalagachhia Union
- Panpatti Union

=== Kalapara Upazila ===
- Baliatali Union
- Chakamaia Union
- Champapur Union
- Dalbugonj Union
- Dhankhali Union
- Dulaser Union
- Lalua Union
- Latachapli Union
- Mahipur Union
- Mihagonj Union
- Nilgonj Union
- Tiakhali Union

=== Mirzaganj ===
- Amragachia Union
- Deuli Subidkhali Union
- Kakrabunia Union
- Madhabkhali Union
- Majidbaria Union
- Mirzaganj Union

=== Patuakhali Sadar ===
- Auliapur Union
- Badarpur Union
- Boro Bighai Union
- Choto Bighai Union
- Itbaria Union
- Jainkathi Union
- Kalikapur Union
- Kamalapur Union
- Laukathi Union
- Lohalia Union
- Madarbunia Union
- Marichbunia Union

=== Rangabali ===
- Rangabali Sadar Union
- Boro Baishadia Union
- Chhoto Baishdia Union
- Char Momtaz Union
- Chalitabunia Union
- Maudubi Union

=== Dumki ===
- Angaria Union
- Labukhali Union
- Muradia Union
- Pangasia Union
- Sreerampur Union

== Pirojpur District ==
=== Bhandaria Upazila ===
- Bhandaria Union
- Bhitabaria Union
- Dhaoa Union
- Gouripur Union
- Ikri Union
- Nudmulla Union
- Telikhali Union

=== Kawkhali Upazila ===
- Amrajuri Union
- Shial Kati Union
- Chirapara Parshaturia Union
- Kawkhali Union
- Sayna Raghunathpur Union

=== Mathbaria Upazila ===
- Amragasia Union
- Betmor Rajpara Union
- Boromasua Union
- Daudkhali Union
- Mathbaria Union
- Mirukhali Union
- Shapleza Union
- Tikikata Union
- Tuskhali Union
- Dhanishafa Union
- Gulishkhali Union

=== Nazirpur Upazila ===
- Daulbari Dobra Union
- Dirgha Union
- Kolardoania Union
- Malikhali Union
- Mativangga Union
- Nazirpur Union
- Shakhmatia Union
- Shakharikathi Union
- Sriramkathi Union

=== Pirojpur Sadar Upazila ===
- Durgapur Union
- Kadamtala Union
- Kalakhali Union
- Shankorpasha Union
- Shariktola Union
- Tona Union
- Sikder Mallik Union

=== Nesarabad Upazila ===
- Atghar Kuriana Union
- Baldia Union
- Daihari Union
- Guarekha Union
- Jalabari Union
- Nesarabad Union
- Sarengkathi Union
- Sohagdal Union
- Somudoykathi Union
- Sutiakathi Union

=== Indurkani ===
- Indurkani Sadar Union
- Chandipur Union
- Balipara Union
- Parerhat Union
- Pattashi Union
