= List of maritime disasters in Bangladesh =

This is a list of maritime disasters that have taken place in the Bangladesh. It may also be called maritime incidents or ferry disasters. The list may be incomplete for years before 1986 or later. During the past 25 years (since 1994), 250 ferry incidents with over 2,000 deaths have been recorded till 2019.

Ferry incidents "occur frequently in Bangladesh" due to structural-defects, severe weather, overcrowding and noncompliance to safety standards.

== 1986 - 1990 ==
- On 20 April 1986, ferry Atlas Star was carrying the passengers in Shitalakshya river when a cyclone struck it and killed 200 people.
- On 25 May 1986, a ferry sank in Meghna river near Barishal district that left 600 people dead with several other missing.
- On 27 December 1986, ferry Haisal was accidentally struck by a cargo ship in Dhaleswari river and killed 200 people.
- On 28 January 1990, a ferry sank in a river when it collided with another vessel. The incident subsequently killed several people, but the actual toll was never counted.

== 1994 - 1996 ==
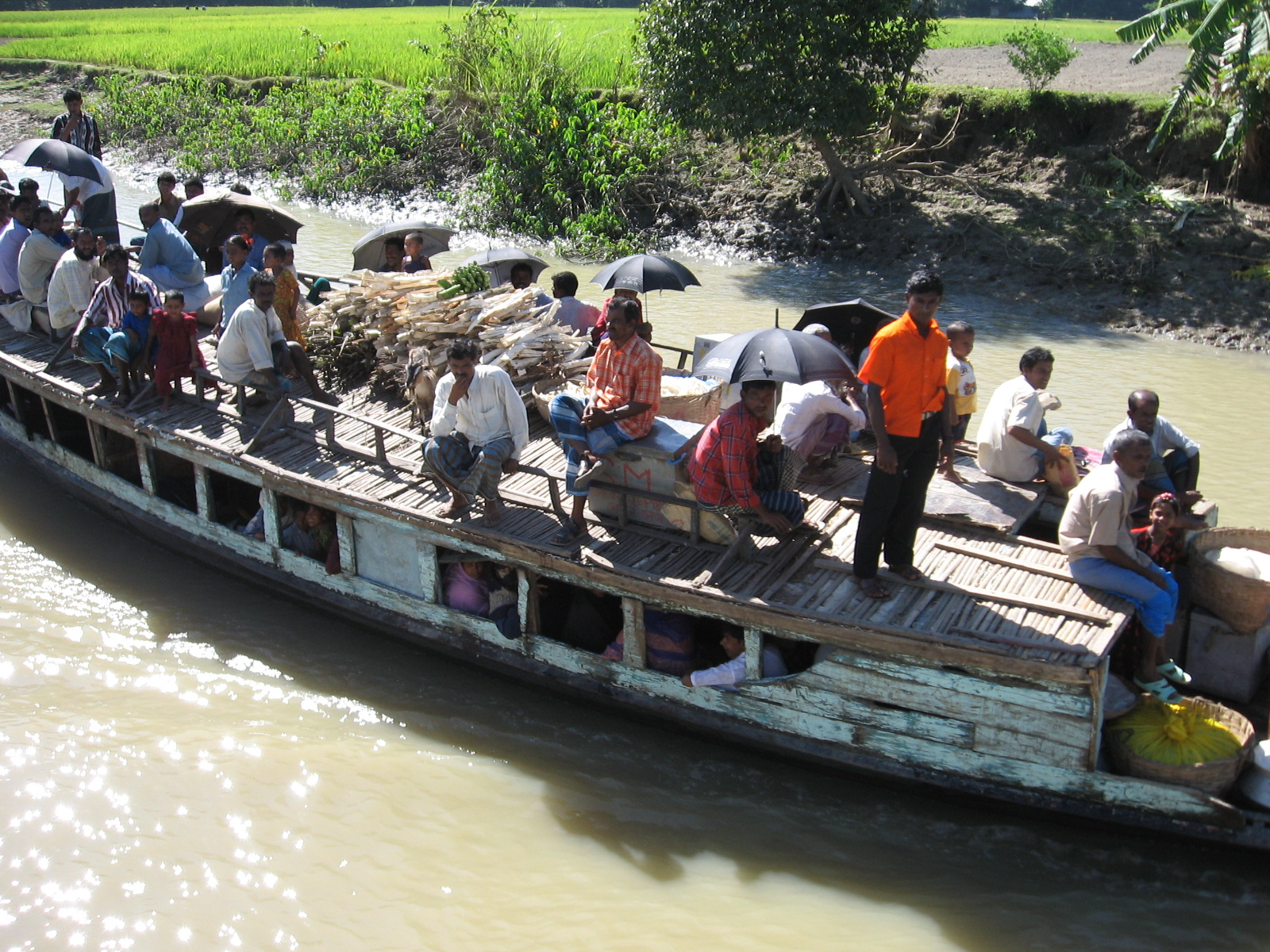
A small launch in the Haor Bangladesh

- On 20 August 1994, more than 200 people were killed when an overloaded ferry sank in Meghna river.
- On 1 January 1996, an oil tanker struck a small ferry that subsequently killed 50 people in Meghna river.
- On 14 June 1996, a ferry carrying 250 passengers met with an accident and killed 50 people when it capsized in Dhanu river.
- On 23 June 1996, a ferry sank in Jamuna river and killed 50 people while it was carrying 200 passengers.
- On 28 June 1996, a ferry in the Bay of Bengal sank in the river with 150 passengers during an extreme weather condition.

== 1998 - 1999 ==
- On 14 March 1998, two ferries sank in a river and killed at least 20 passengers and 30 went missing.
- On 8 May 1999, the MV Dwipkanya vessel sank in river near Lakshmipur district that killed 100 to 300 people.
- On 5 August 1999, a boat sank in Sitalakya river after a collision and killed 20 people.
- On 11 December 1999, a ferry was carrying about 200 passengers when it sank in Meghna river and killed 63 people.
- On 17 December 1999, a ferry in Buriganga river capsized with 250 passengers and killed 15 people with several others missing.

== 2000 - 2002 ==
- On 1 May 2000, two ferries capsized during a severe weather in Meghna river that subsequently killed 73 people and 100 went missing.
- In December 2000, a ferry with 400 passengers sank in Meghna river and subsequently killed 158 people.
- On 29 November 2001, a ferry with 130 passengers sank in Tentulia river, however, the actual toll is not known.
- On 3 May 2002, MV Salahuddin-2 was set on sail with 500 passengers when she sank in Meghna river and subsequently killed 300 people.
- On 23 May 2002, ML Suraha with 100 passengers sank during a stormy weather in Baleshwari river when it was moving towards Khulna from Charduani. The incident left 60 people missing and 40 other were rescued.

== 2003 - 2004 ==
- On 4 April 2003, a ferry sank in the Surma river that subsequently killed 62 people.
- On 21 April 2003, two ferries sank in Buriganga and Meghna river during a severe weather that killed 200 people in two separate incidents.
- On 8 July 2003, a triple-deck ferry MV Nasrin-1 sank in Meghna river that killed over 500 people.
- On 23 May 2004, two ferries sank in Meghna river that killed about 200 people.

== 2005 - 2006 ==
- On 19 February 2005, M V Moharaj (Dhaka-Motlob-Dhaka) Launch sank in Burigonga river near Dhaka that subsequently killed 118 people while 80 people went missing.
- On 15 May 2005, a two-deck ferry MV Prince sank in Tentulia river that killed 60 people and more than 30 went missing.
- On 8 June 2006, a ferry sank in Bay of Bengal during a stormy weather that killed 17 people and 20 other passengers went missing.
- On 23 October 2006, an overcrowded ferry with 125 passengers capsized in Meghna river that killed 15 people with 35 others missing.

== 2008 - 2009 ==
- On 28 February 2008, MV Shourav with 100 passengers sank in Buriganga river that killed 39 people.
- On 13 May 2008, MV Nazimuddin sank in Ghorautra river that subsequently killed 14 people.
- On 27 November 2009, MV Coco-4 was struck by a river shoal, leading the vessel lost her balance. The incident killed 75 people with several other missing.
- On 4 December 2009, a motorboat capsized in Daira river that killed 47 people with 8 others missing.

== 2011 - 2015 ==
- On 21 April 2011, a ferry with 100 passengers was moving from Bhairab towards Jamalganj when it collided with a shipwreck that left 24 people dead.
- On 12 March 2012, MV Shariatpur 1 with 250 passengers sank in the Meghna river that killed 147 people. The incident occurred after it collided with a cargo ship.
- On 8 February 2013, a ferry with more than 50 passengers sank in a river near Munshiganj district after colliding with a sand barge. The incident killed 14 people with several other missing.
- On 15 May 2014, MV Miraj-4 with 150 to 200 passengers sank in Meghna river that killed 29 people with several other missing.
- On 4 August 2014, MV Pinak-6 capsized near Mushinganj
- On 23 Feb 2015, a vessel with 140 passengers collided with a cargo ship and sank in a Bangladesh river that subsequently killed 69 people with several other missing.

== 2016 - present ==
- On 21 September 2016, ML Oishee ferry capsized near Barishal in Sondha river that killed 13 people with 15 passengers missing.
- On 6 February 2020, a small wooden boat with 130 passengers was set on sail from Bangladesh to Malaysia when it sank in Bay of Bengal. The incident killed 11 Rohingya refugees with several other missing.
- On 29 June 2020, MV Morning Bird, which was carrying up to 60 passengers sunk in the Buriganga River after colliding with Mayur-2, a larger ferry, at around 8:55 a.m. The incident killed at least 34 passengers.
- On 4 April 2021, ML Sabit Al Hasan with 50 passengers capsized in the Shitalakkhya river in Narayanganj district. The incident killed 34 people.
- On 3 May 2021, a speedboat coming from Munshiganj District, which was going to Madaripur District crashed into a sand-laden bulk carrier that saw the death of at least 26 people. Five wounded people were rescued so far, including three children from the speedboat which was carrying 36 passengers. However, five others are still believed to be missing.
- On 24 December 2021, a ferry from Dhaka to Barguna caught fire in the Sugandha River in Jhalokati Sadar Upazila, killing at least 39 people and injuring at least 72.
- On 5 January 2022, a trawler carrying 70 people collided with the ferry MV Farhan-6 in the Meghna river, and sank. Four crew of MV Farhan 6, including the captain, were detained by authorities.

== See also ==
- List of disasters in Bangladesh by death toll
- List of shipwrecks of Asia
- List of aviation accidents and incidents in Bangladesh
