= Bara Kanthalia =

Bara Kanthalia বড় কাঁঠালিয়া
- Village
- Location in Bangladesh
- Coordinates: 22°24′42″N 90°08′11″E
- Country: Bangladesh
- Division: Barisal Division
- District: Jhalkathi District
- Upazila: Kathalia
- Union: Kanthalia

Population (2011)
  - Total: 1,804
- Time zone: UTC+6 (Bangladesh Time)
- Postal code: 8430
- Area code: 10 42 43 442 410 020
- Website: Official Govt. Website

Bara Kanthalia is a village in Kanthalia Union of Kathalia Upazila in the Jhalokati District of Barisal Division of southern-central Bangladesh.
