= Kanthalia Union =

Kanthalia Union কাঁঠালিয়া ইউনিয়ন
- Union council
- Kanthalia Union within Bangladesh
- Coordinates: 22°23′40″N 90°6′55″E
- Country: Bangladesh
- Division: Barisal Division
- District: Jhalokati District
- Upazila: Kathalia Upazila
- Union formed: 1986

Government
  - Type: Union Council

Area
  - Total: 17.49861 km^{2} (6.75625 sq mi)

Population
  - Total: 19,333
  - Density: 1,104.8/km^{2} (2,861.5/sq mi)
- Time zone: UTC+6 (BST)
- Postal code: 8430
- Website: kanthaliaup.jhalakathi.gov.bd

Kanthalia Union (Bengali: কাঁঠালিয়া ইউনিয়ন) is one of the six union parishads under Kathalia Upazila of Jhalakati District in the Barishal Division of southern region of Bangladesh.

== Geography ==
Kanthalia Union is located at 22°23′39.998″N 90°6′55.001″E. Kanthalia Union is situated at the Kathalia Sadar of Kathalia Upazila. It shares borders with Panchanoanda Canal to the north, Hetalbuniya-Amua Road located in the south, to the east Bishkhali River, to the west Majhibari Canal.

Kanthalia Union has an area of 4324 acres.

=== Canals and rivers ===
- Bishkhali River
- Boro Kanthalia Canal
- Aura Canal

== Demographics ==
According to Census-2011, The total population of Kanthalia Union is 19,333.Among them number of male is 9376 and number of female is 9957.Number of total family is 5,082.

=== Village-wise population ===
Village-wise Population of Kanthalia Union
Serial No.	Name of Village	Population		Total Population
Serial No.	Name of Village	Male	Female	Total Population
1	North Aura	3289	3314	6603
2	Bara Kanthalia	885	919	1804
3	Kanthalia	3101	2923	6024
4	South Aura	534	527	1061
5	West Aura	963	1011	1974
6	Ainolbuniya	1207	1279	2486
7	Joykhali	981	1013	1994
9	Lebubuniya	425	453	878
10	Chingrakhali	459	511	970
11	Amribuniya	669	702	1371
12	Moshabuniya	445	478	923
13	Hetalbuniya	699	735	1434

== Economy ==
The main occupations of the people of this area are business and service holding. Other occupations are fish farming, fish hunting, animal husbandry, poultry rearing etc.

The major crops of these area are paddy, betel nut, pulses, and grains of summer.

=== Markets ===
List of Markets in Kanthalia Union
Serial No.	Name of Market	Days
01	Kanthalia Market	Monday and Friday
02	Aura Market	Sunday and Thursday
03	BotTola Market	Saturday and Tuesday

== Places of interest ==
=== Choilar Chor (Sonneratia Island) ===
Beside the Bishkhali river of Kathalia Upazila, there is an island in Hetalbuniya village named "Choilar Chor". It is an island of about 30.61 acre area. There are a lot of Choila tree (Mangrove Apple Tree) in that island; that's why the island was named after it. There is scenic landscape and picnic spot for tourists.

== Administration ==
Kanthalia Union is the 4th Union Parishad Under Kathalia Upazila.The administrative activities of this union is under Kanthalia Union Parishad. This is included in the 125 No. Electoral Area Jhalakathi-1 of National Parliament.

At present, there is 13 wards under Kanthalia Union.The administrative activities of this union is under Kanthalia Union Parishad.

Villages of Kanthalia Union
Serial No.	Village Name	Ward Number
01	North Aura	01
02	Bara Kanthalia	01
03	Kanthalia	02
04	South Aura	02
05	West Aura	03
06	North Ainolbuniya	04
07	South Ainolbuniya	05
08	Joykhali	06
09	Lebubuniya	07
10	Chingrakhali	07
11	Amribuniya	08
12	Moshabuniya	08
13	Hetalbuniya	09

== Transport ==
=== Roadway ===
Road communication has improved significantly in recent days. People can travel Kanthalia by bus or private car from Jhalokati, Bhandaria, Barisal, Pirojpur directly.

There is bus service from Gabtoli, Sayedabad, Chattogram and Khulna.

=== Waterway ===
Water transport is a major attraction in this area. Numerous rivers and canals force the inhabitants to use boats as the main medium of transportation. People can travel at a cheap cost by boats and various types of engine boats. Kanthalia is famous for beautiful rivers, canals and islands. Tourists can find it enjoyable to travel Kanthalia through boats, launches and steamers. People can travel from main Inland Ports to Kanthalia River Port directly.

== Education ==
According to the Census-2011, the literacy rate of Kanthalia Union is about 75%.

There are 17 primary schools, 3 high schools, and 2 colleges.

== See also ==
- Upazilas of Bangladesh
- Districts of Bangladesh
- Divisions of Bangladesh
