= Shaulajalia Union =

Shaulajalia Union শৌলজালিয়া Union
- Union council
- 3rd Shaulajalia Union Council
- Map Showing Shaulajalia Union in Bangladesh
- Coordinates: 22°26′39.998″N 90°8′11.000″E
- Country: Bangladesh
- Division: Barisal Division
- District: Jhalokati District
- Upazila: Kathalia Upazila
- Union Council Formed: 1973
- Seat of Government: Upazila Parishad

Government
  - Type: Union Council

Area
  - Total: 1,471 ha (3,634 acres)

Population
  - Total: 31,125
  - Density: 2,116/km^{2} (5,482/sq mi)
- Time zone: UTC+6 (BST)
- Website: shaulajaliaup.jhalakathi.gov.bd/

Shaulajalia Union (Bengali:শৌলজালিয়া ইউনিয়ন) is one of the six union councils under Kathalia Upazila of Jhalakati District in the Barishal Division of southern region of Bangladesh.

== Geography ==
Shaulajalia Union is located at 22°26′39.998″N 90°8′11.000″E. Shaulajalia Union is situated at the Kathalia Sadar of Kathalia Upazila.

Shaulajalia has an area of 5,468 hectares.

=== Canals and rivers ===
1. Bishkahli River
2. Talgachia Canal
3. Kochua Molanishi Canal
4. Dulamora Canal
5. Bhandaria Varani Canal
6. Hijoltola Canal
7. Kochua Ponchanda Canal
8. Binapani Itbaria Canal
9. Kochua Kathal Bari Canal
10. Boiragi Canal
11. Chararhater Canal

== Demographics ==
The total population of Shaulajalia Union is 31,125.Among them number of male is 15,464 and number of female is 15,271.Number of total family is 6,333.

=== Village-wise population ===
Village-wise Population of Shaulajalia Union
Name of the village	Total Population	Male	Female
Lotabunia	2520	1210	1310
Kochua	5012	2500	2512
West Shaulajalia	1503	2150	2353
Boltola	4202	2100	2102
Koikhali	2562	1205	1357
South Koikhali	3505	1700	1805
Shaulajalia	3410	1650	1760
Roghuarchor	2850	1400	1450
Talgachia	2410	1150	1260

== Economy ==
=== Market list ===
Markets of Shoulajalia Union
Sl.	Name	Address
1	Dogona Bazar	Vill: Baltala, Post: Dogonahat, Kathalia, Jhalakathi.
2	Binapani Bazar	Vill: Kaikhali, Post: Binapani, Kathalia, Jhalakathi.
3	Kachua Bazar	Vill: Kachua, Post: Kachua, Kathalia, Jhalakathi.
4	Sentarer Hat	Vill: Shouljalia, Post: Shouljalia, Kathalia, Jhalakathi.
5	Sonar Bangla Bazar	Vill: Talgachia, Post: Talgachia, Kathalia, Jhalakathi
6	Charar Hat	Vill: Talgachia, Post: Talgachia, Kathalia, Jhalakathi
7	Latabunia Bazar	Latabubia, Kathalia, Jhalakathi
8	Amratala Bazar	Vill: Talgachia, Post: Talgachia, Kathalia, Jhalakathi
9	Babdaghata Bazar	South Kaikhali, Kathalia, Jhalakathi
10	Mollar Hat	Vill: Baltala, Post: Dogonahat, Kathalia, Jhalakathi.

== Places of interest ==
=== Hakkunnur Darbar Sharif ===
Hakkunnur Darbar Sharif is situated on the bank of Bishkhali River.

=== Choilar Char ===
Choilar Char is An island in the middle of the Bishkhali river.

== Administration ==
Shaulajalia Union is a union parishad under Kathalia Upazila. This is included in the Jhalakathi-1 constituency of National Parliament .

At present, there are 16 villages under Shaulajalia Union. The administrative activities of this union is under Shaulajalia Union Parishad.

== Transportation ==
=== Roadway ===
It is possible to reach Soulajalia Union Council from Kathalia Upazila by bus, rickshaw or auto-rickshaw.

=== Waterway ===
One can reach Soulajalia Union Council by boat or steamer from Betagi Launch Port.

== Education ==
The literacy rate of Shaulajalia Union is about 77%.

== See also ==
- Upazilas of Bangladesh
- Districts of Bangladesh
- Divisions of Bangladesh
