= Awrabunia Union =

Awrabunia Union আওরাবুনিয়া Union
- Union council
- 6th Awrabunia Union Council
- Map Showing Awrabunia Union in Bangladesh
- Coordinates: 22°28′59.999″N 90°9′28.001″E
- Country: Bangladesh
- Division: Barisal Division
- District: Jhalokati District
- Upazila: Kathalia Upazila
- Union Council Formed: 1973
- Seat of Government: Upazila Parishad

Government
  - Type: Union Council

Area
  - Total: 2,036 ha (5,032 acres)

Population
  - Total: 16,901
  - Density: 830.0/km^{2} (2,150/sq mi)
- Time zone: UTC+6 (BST)
- Website: awrabuniaup.jhalakathi.gov.bd/

Awrabunia Union (Bengali:আওরাবুনিয়া ইউনিয়ন) is one of the six union councils under Kathalia Upazila of Jhalakati District in the Barishal Division of southern region of Bangladesh.

== Geography ==
Awrabunia Union is located at 22°28′59.999″N 90°9′28.001″E. Awrabunia Union is situated near the Kathalia Sadar of Kathalia Upazila.

== Area ==
Awrabunia has an area of 5,032 acres.

== Administration ==
=== Administrative Structure ===
Awrabunia Union is the 6th Union Parishad Under Kathalia Upazila.The administrative activities of this union is under Kathalia Union Parishad. This is included in the 125 No. Electoral Area Jhalakathi-1 of National Parliament .

== Administrative Areas ==
At Present, there is 9 villages under Awrabunia Union.The administrative activities of this union is under Awrabunia Union Parishad.

== Demographics ==
According to Census-2011, The total population of Awrabunia Union is 16,901.Among them number of male is 8,227 and number of female is 8,674.Number of total family is 3,923.

== Education ==
According to the Census-2011, the literacy rate of Awrabunia Union is about 95%.

== Places of interest ==
=== Awrabunia Jomadder Bari Masjid ===
Awrabunia Jomadder Bari Masjid is a hundreds year aged Mosque built in Mughal period. Thousands of Muslim says there prayer here till now.

== See also ==
- Upazilas of Bangladesh
- Districts of Bangladesh
- Divisions of Bangladesh
