= Patikhalghata Union =

Union council under Kathalia Upazila, Jhalakati, Barishal, Bangladesh

Patikhalghata Union পাটিখালঘাটা Union
- Union council
- 2nd Patikhalghata Union Council
- Map Showing Patikhalghata Union in Bangladesh
- Coordinates: 22°22′44.000″N 90°2′43.001″E
- Country: Bangladesh
- Division: Barisal Division
- District: Jhalokati District
- Upazila: Kathalia Upazila
- Union Council Formed: 1973
- Seat of Government: Upazila Parishad

Government
  - Type: Union Council

Area
  - Total: 1,786 ha (4,414 acres)

Population
  - Total: 25,044
  - Density: 1,402/km^{2} (3,631/sq mi)
- Time zone: UTC+6 (BST)
- Website: patikhalghataup.jhalakathi.gov.bd/

Patikhalghata Union (Bengali: পাটিখালঘাটা ইউনিয়ন) is one of the six union councils under Kathalia Upazila of Jhalakati District in the Barishal Division of southern region of Bangladesh.

== History ==
There is a saying among the people that, once this area was a river char, a forest and a leafy garden. People from far and wide used to cultivate this leaf, made "Pati" with that and sell them in the market. Later when the people started living here and started cultivating land, they named this area Patikhalghata.

== Geography ==
Patikhalghata Union is located at 22°22′44.000″N 90°2′43.001″E. Patikhalghata Union is situated at the Kathalia Sadar of Kathalia Upazila.

Patikhalghata has an area of 4,414 acres.

=== Canal and river ===
- Halta River
- Bahar Canal
- Mistrir Canal

== Culture ==
=== Language ===
With Linguistic Tradition and Independence the rural language of Barishal attracts people especially. In continuity the people of Patikhalghata speak the language.

== Administration ==
Patikhalghata Union is the 2nd Union Parishad Under Kathalia Upazila. The administrative activities of this union is under Kathalia Union Parishad. This is included in the 125 No. Electoral Area Jhalakathi-1 of National Parliament.

At present, there is 6 villages under Patikhalghata Union. The administrative activities of this union is under Patikhalghata Union Parishad.

== Demographics ==
According to Census-2011, The total population of Patikhalghata Union is 15,777. Among them number of male is 7,709 and number of female is 8,068. Number of total family is 3991.

=== Village-wise population ===
Village wise population of Patikhalghata Union
Name of the Village	Population
Tarabunia	3052
Dutter Poshuribunia	2540
Patikhalghta	2245
Neyamatpura	2900
Morichbunia	3150
Jhorkhali	1825

== Education ==
According to the Census-2011, the literacy rate of Patikhalghata Union is about 53%.

=== Number of educational institutions ===
- Primary School-09
- Madrasa-07
- Non-Gov. Reg. Primary School-03
- High School-04
- Lower Secondary School-01

== Transport ==
The distance from Kathalia Upazila Sadar to Patikhalghata Union Council is 9 km. People can reach Amua from Kathalia by Bus or rickshaw at first. Then they have to board on steamer to reach directly to Patikhalghata Union Council.

== Places of interest ==
- Ashar Alo Jame Masjid

== Markets ==
Name of the markets are:

- Tarabunia Market
- Patikhalghata Market
- Neyamatpura Mollarhat Market
- Morichbunia Market
- Jhorkhali New Market

== See also ==
- Upazilas of Bangladesh
- Districts of Bangladesh
- Divisions of Bangladesh
