= List of disasters in Bangladesh by death toll =

This is a list of disasters in Bangladesh sorted by death toll.

Throughout history, Bangladesh has experienced various types of natural disasters. Most of the natural disasters happen during May to July.

== 100 or more deaths ==
Disaster	Type	Location	Deaths	Date	Notes	Ref.
Bangladesh famine of 1974	Famine					
1970 Bhola cyclone	Cyclone	Bhola	500,000+	12 November 1970	Entire coast of Bangladesh (then called East Pakistan)	
	Cyclone	Bengal	200,000+	1897	A cyclone with a storm-surge of 12.2 metres (40 ft) hit the Meghna River estuary near Chittagong, Barisal, and Noakhali. It caused about 200,000 casualties. The storm also caused epidemic, famine, and vast property damage.	
Great Backerganj Cyclone of 1876	Cyclone	Coast of Backerganj	200,000	1876		
1991 Bangladesh Cyclone	Cyclone	Chittagong	138,866	1991	A cyclone hit the coastal islands and chars near Patuakhali, Barisal, Noakhali and Chittagong. Maximum wind speed reached 110 km/h. The storm surge was 1.9 metres.	
2013 Rana Plaza collapse	Building collapse	Dhaka	1,134	24 April 2013	Collapse of the Rana Plaza, Savar Upazila, Dhaka District, Bangladesh	
1986 Bangladesh MV Shamia ferry incident	Shipwrecking	Meghna River	600	25 May 1986		
MV Salahuddin-2	Shipwrecking	Meghna River	450+	3 May 2002		

== 40 to 99 confirmed deaths ==
Disaster	Type	Location	Deaths	Date	Notes	Ref.
1984 Biman Bangladesh Airlines Fokker F27 crash	Aviation accident	Near Hazrat Shahjalal International Airport	49	5 August 1984		

== See also ==
- List of Bangladesh tropical cyclones
- List of maritime disasters in Bangladesh
- List of aviation accidents and incidents in Bangladesh
