= Amua Union =

Amua Union আমুয়া Union
- Union council
- 3rd Amua Union Council
- Map Showing Amua Union in Bangladesh
- Coordinates: 22°22′44.000″N 90°4′40.001″E
- Country: Bangladesh
- Division: Barisal Division
- District: Jhalokati District
- Upazila: Kathalia Upazila
- Union Council Formed: 1973
- Seat of Government: Upazila Parishad

Government
  - Type: Union Council

Area
  - Total: 2,507 ha (6,194 acres)

Population
  - Total: 24,053
  - Density: 959.6/km^{2} (2,485/sq mi)
- Time zone: UTC+6 (BST)
- Website: amuaup.jhalakathi.gov.bd/

Amua Union (Bengali:আমুয়া ইউনিয়ন) is one of the six union councils under Kathalia Upazila of Jhalakati District in the Barishal Division of southern region of Bangladesh.

== Geography ==
Amua Union is located at 22°22′44.000″N 90°4′40.001″E. Amua Union is situated at the Kathalia Sadar of Kathalia Upazila.

Amua has an area of 6,194 acres.

== Administration ==
Amua Union is the 3rd Union Parishad Under Kathalia Upazila.The administrative activities of this union is under Kathalia Union Parishad. This is included in the 125 No. Electoral Area Jhalakathi-1 of National Parliament.

== Administrative Areas ==
At Present, there is 6 villages under Amua Union.The administrative activities of this union is under Amua Union Parishad.

== Demographics ==
According to Census-2011, The total population of Amua Union is 24,053.Among them number of male is 11,736 and number of female is 12,317.Number of total family is 6,333.

== Education ==
The literacy rate of Amua Union is about 95%.

=== Number of Educational Institution ===
- Primary School-22
- High School -3
- Madrasa-06
- College-01

== Places of interest ==
=== Halta River ===
Amua is situated at the bank of Halta river which is very popular. Many steamers, boats ply from the river. It is at the south of Amua. On the east side of the river there is Upazila Health Complex, Amua Bazar at West, Bamna Ferryghat at south and Amua Union Parishad, Food Storage and Post Office is at the North.

== Notable personalities ==
The Notable Personalities of Amua Union are:

1. Late Dhiren Dutta
2. Late Nurul Huda Sikder
3. Advocate Fazlul Haque
4. Late Motiyar Rohoman Golder
5. Md Shahjahan Golder

== See also ==
- Upazilas of Bangladesh
- Districts of Bangladesh
- Divisions of Bangladesh
