= Chenchrirampur Union =

Chenchrirampur Union চেঁচরী রামপুর Union
- Union council
- 1st Chenchrirampur Union Council
- Map Showing Chenchrirampur Union in Bangladesh
- Coordinates: 22°25′37.999″N 90°4′4.001″E
- Country: Bangladesh
- Division: Barisal Division
- District: Jhalokati District
- Upazila: Kathalia Upazila
- Union Council Formed: 1973
- Seat of Government: Upazila Parishad

Government
  - Type: Union Council

Area
  - Total: 3,416 ha (8,441 acres)

Population
  - Total: 25,044
  - Density: 733.1/km^{2} (1,899/sq mi)
- Time zone: UTC+6 (BST)
- Website: chenchrirampurup.jhalakathi.gov.bd/

Chenchrirampur Union (Bengali: চেঁচরী রামপুর ইউনিয়ন) is one of the six union councils under Kathalia Upazila of Jhalakati District in the Barishal Division of southern region of Bangladesh.

== Geography ==
Chenchrirampur Union is located at 22°25′37.999″N 90°4′4.001″E. Chenchrirampur Union is situated at the Kathalia Sadar of Kathalia Upazila.

Chenchrirampur has an area of 8441 acres.

== Administration ==
Chenchrirampur Union is under Kathalia Upazila.The administrative activities of this union is under Kathalia Union Parishad. This is included in the Jhalakathi-1 constituency of the National Parliament .

At present, there are 8 villages under Chenchrirampur Union. The administrative activities of this union is under Chenchrirampur Union Parishad.

== Demographics ==
According to Census-2011, The total population of Chenchrirampur Union is 25,044.Among them number of male is 12,193 and number of female is 12,851.Number of total family is 6.067.

== Educational ==
According to the Census-2011, the literacy rate of Kathalia Union is about 69%.

=== Number of educational institutions ===
- College-01
- Primary School-16
- Junior School-01
- Community School-01
- Dakhil Madrasa-05
- Reg. Primary School-01
- High School-05
- Primary Madrasa-02
- Technical College-01

== Places of interest ==
=== Doctor Bari Majar ===
Every year there held Annual Orosh and Mahfil.

== See also ==
- Upazilas of Bangladesh
- Districts of Bangladesh
- Divisions of Bangladesh
