= Analbania =

Anailbunia আনইলবুনিয়া Analbunia
- Location in Bangladesh
- Coordinates: 22°24′N 90°7′E
- Country: Bangladesh
- Division: Barisal Division
- District: Jhalokati District
- Upazila: Kathalia
- Union Council: Kathalia Union Council

Government
  - North Analbunia MUP: Muhammad Ayyub Ali Mridha
  - South Analbunia MUP: Muhammad Ruhul Amin

Population (2011)
  - Total: 2,489
  - Ethnicities: Bengalis
  - Religions: Islam
- Time zone: UTC+6 (Bangladesh Time)

Anailbunia (Bengali: আনইলবুনিয়া, romanized: Anôilbuniya), also known as Analbunia (Bengali: আনলবুনিয়া, romanized: Anôlbuniya), is a village located in Kathalia Upazila, Jhalokati District in Bangladesh's southern-central Barisal Division. The total population of Anailbunia is 2489, with 1207 being men and 1279 being women.

== History ==
In late 2020, the village gained repute with the success of Bangabandhu National Youth Award recipient Musammat Shirin Sultana in her multipurpose 6 bigha agro-farm project and training in youth development.

== Administration ==
Anailbunia is divided into North Anailbunia and South Anailbunia, with the former forming the 4th ward of the Kathalia Union and the latter forming the 5th ward of the same Union Parishad. The ward councillors are Muhammad Ayyub Ali Mridha and MSc Muhammad Ruhul Amin respectively.

== Facilities ==
The village is home to the Anailbunia Government Primary School, whose headteacher is Abdus Salam. Mosammat Tanya Sharmin is the principal of the South Anailbunia Community School. The Battala Bazar and Chander Hat Bazar are the two haat bazaars of Anailbunia. There are thirteen mosques in the village, to cater for the Muslim-majority inhabitants:

List of mosques
Name	Imam
North Anailbunia Khan Bari Jame Mosque	Muhammad Mizanur Rahman
North Anailbunia Mukhlisur Rahman Bari Jame Mosque	Muhammad Ali Husayn
North Anailbunia Shiqdar Bari Jame Mosque	Muhammad Abdus Sattar Munshi
North Anailbunia Sharif Bari Jame Mosque	Muhammad Masud Miah
North Anailbunia Mridha Bari Jame Mosque	Muhammad Abdur Rashid
North Anailbunia Moulvi Bari Jame Mosque	Muhammad Shah Jahan
Anailbunia Munshi Bari Mosque	Muhammad Firdaws Khan
Anailbunia Sharif Mosque	Muhammad Altaf Husayn
Chander Hat Bazar Jame Mosque	Muhammad Mukhlisur Rahman
Chander Hat Mridha Bari Mosque	Muhammad Monesur Rahman
Gahur Hawladar Bari Jame Mosque	Muhammad Shaharum Hawladar
Muhammad Moulvi Bari Jame Mosque	Muhammad Abdul Hakim
Battala Bazar Bari Jame Mosque	Muhammad Zahirul Islam
