= 2021 Bangladesh ferry fire =

Jhalokati river disaster

- Date: 24 December 2021
- Time: Around 3 a.m. (BST)
- Location: Sugandha River, near Jhalokati, Jhalokati District, Bangladesh; 22°37′51″N 90°10′55″E
- Cause: Fire on MV Avijan-10
- Deaths: 41-85
- Injuries: 100+
- On board: 800+

On 24 December 2021, the passenger ferry MV Avijan-10 caught fire on the Sugandha River, near the town of Jhalokati, in southern Bangladesh. The incident resulted in at least 40 deaths and more than 100 injuries. Several people were reported missing.

== Background ==
Close to 30 percent of Bangladeshis commute on rivers, especially the lower class. Ferry accidents are common in the country, which are "often blamed on overcrowding or lax safety rules".

== Accident ==
The three-decked MV Avijan-10 was traveling from Dhaka to Barguna, a trip of 250 kilometres (155 mi). The ferry had a capacity of 310 but was carrying 800 passengers, many of whom were returning home for the weekend. The fire broke out off the coast of Jhalokati on the Sugandha River, around 03:00, when many of the passengers were asleep. According to the deputy director of the Fire Service and Civil Defence at Brishal, the blaze started in the engine room and quickly spread to other parts of the ferry.

One of the passengers stated the ferry appeared to have engine problems before the fire. The engine was later filled with smoke. Some passengers jumped into the river and swam to the shore to escape the fire. The Daily Star reported that 15 firefighting units arrived at the scene within 50 minutes of the fire, and the situation was brought under control at 05:20 A dense fog hampered the rescue operations.

According to a local official, the boat had to be anchored on a riverbank of the nearby village of Diakul. Zohar Ali, the chief administrator of the district, stated that 4–5 hours passed before the fire was extinguished. It took another 8 hours for the vessel to cool down.

== Victims ==
Local police chief Moinul Islam stated that 37 bodies were recovered. Most of the victims either died from the fire or drowned during their escape. In addition, 70 injured passengers were hospitalized, seven of whom had severe burns and were in critical condition. The death toll rose to 40 the following day.

By 25 December, authorities buried at least twenty-three unclaimed bodies. A government official told reporters that there was a list of 17 people that were unaccounted for, but that others may not have been reported as missing.

== Investigation ==
Following the incident, a special committee was set up by the government to investigate the fire and report the findings within three days.

According to The Daily Star, the boatmaster failed to properly moor the launch after the engines died, and abandoned the vessel without dropping an anchor. The launch then drifted downstream for over 30 minutes before stopping near Diakul. The main gate of the launch was also locked, preventing people from escaping. Additionally, officials at Barishal office of the Bangladesh Inland Water Transport Authority said the launch was supposed to have a first class master, but had two second class masters instead.

An engine fault was postulated to have been the cause of the fire. The previous two engines on the vessel were replaced by one of the vessel's owners, Hanjalal Sheikh, in November for a lack of fuel efficiency without permission being granted or informing the Shipping Department of the changes. The owner stated he was not aware permission was required. The engine fault was thought to have begun as a minor issue, which then progressed after no one fixed it. Sheikh was arrested on 27 December by the Rapid Action Battalion.

== See also ==
- List of maritime disasters in Bangladesh
- List of shipwrecks of Asia
