= Jahangir Kabir =

Bangladeshi politician

- জাহাঙ্গীর কবীর

Member of Jatiya Sangsad
- In office 7 May 1986 – 27 February 1991
- Succeeded by: Shahjahan Omar
- Constituency: Jhalokati-1

Personal details
- Party: Jatiya Party

Jahangir Kabir (Bengali: জাহাঙ্গীর কবীর) is a Bangladeshi politician and journalist. He was a former member of parliament for Jhalokati-1, as a Jatiya Party candidate.

== Early life and family ==
Kabir was born into a political Bengali Muslim Zamindar family known as the Taluqdars of Chechrirampur in Kathalia, Jhalokati, then under the Backergunge District. The family traced their ancestry to Tendur Khan, a claimed descendant of Sultan Sher Shah Suri, who first settled in Faridpur from Sasaram. Tendur Khan then settled in Chechrirampur, and was given the taluq of Syedpur Pargana. Kabir's genealogy is as follows: Jahangir Kabir, son of Tafazzal Husayn Khan Tota Mia, son of Muazzam Husayn Khan Naya Mia, son of Ahsan Khan, son of Bhola Khan, son of Nasir Khan. His paternal uncle, Nurul Husayn Khan Nanna Mia, was an associate of Huseyn Shaheed Suhrawardy and editor for the All-India Muslim League Volunteers Force.

== Career ==
Kabir was elected to parliament from Jhalokati-1 as a Jatiya Party candidate in 1986 and 1988.
