= Osmanganj Union =

Union of Bhola District

Osmanganj ওসমানগঞ্জ
- Osmanganj Union Parishad
- Location in Bangladesh
- Coordinates: 22°06′31″N 90°44′57″E
- Country: Bangladesh
- Division: Barisal
- District: Bhola
- Upazila: Char Fasson

Government
  - Type: Local Government

Area
  - Total: 8,182 ha (20,220 acres)

Population (2001)
  - Total: 22,877
  - Density: 790/km^{2} (2,000/sq mi)
- Time zone: UTC+6 (BST)
- Postal code: 8340
- Area code: 10 09 25 95
- Geocode: 11283681
- Website: osmangonjup.bhola.gov.bd

Osmanganj Union is a union parishad of Char Fasson Upazila in Bhola District of Bangladesh.

== Size and location ==
The area of Osmanganj Union is 6,122 acres. It is bounded on the south by Jinnagar Union, on the east by Char Fashion Municipality and Aslampur Union and on the west by Aminabad Union.

== Administration ==
Osmanganj Union is No. 1 union parishad under Char Fasson Upazila. Administrative activities of this union are under Char Fashion Police Station. It is part of Bhola-4 constituency 118 of the National Assembly. The villages of this union are:

- Hassanganj
- Osmanganj
- Uttar fashion

== Demographics ==
According to the 2011 census, the total population of Osmanganj Union is 22.7. Of these, 11,442 are males and 11,435 are females. Total families 5,123.

== Education ==
According to the 2011 census, the literacy rate of Osmanganj Union is 56.2%. This union contains:

1. Government primary schools - 5.
2. Regi primary schools - 6.
3. Dakhil Madrasa-4.
4. Ebatedai Madrasa - 12
5. Qawmi Madrasa - 10
6. Ananda School - 16
7. BRAC schools - 30
8. Maktabs adjacent to the mosque - 40
9. College - 2

== Economy ==
The people here are dependent on various cottage industries including agriculture and accordingly its economy is in motion.

== Others ==
- Community clinics - 3
- Union Health Clinic-1.
- Mosques - 35
- Temples - 8

== See also ==
- Unions of Bangladesh
