= Rafiqul Islam Jamal =

Bangladeshi politician

- রফিকুল ইসলাম জামাল

Member of the Bangladesh Parliament for Jhalokati-1
- Incumbent
- Assumed office 17 February 2026
- Preceded by: Shahjahan Omar

Personal details
- Born: January 10, 1964 (age 62)q Rajapur Upazila, Jhalokati District
- Party: Bangladesh Nationalist Party

Rafiqul Islam Jamal is a Bangladeshi politician of the Bangladesh Nationalist Party. He has served as a member of parliament from Jhalokati-1 since 2026.

== Early life ==
Zamal was born on 10 January 1964 in Rajapur Upazila in Jhalokati District.
