= Abdullahpur Union =

Union of Bhola District

Abdullahpur Union আবদুল্লাহপুর ইউনিয়ন
- Union
- 18 No. Abdullahpur Union Parishad
- Location within Bangladesh
- Coordinates: 22°9′22.000″N 90°47′28.000″E
- Country: Bangladesh
- Division: Barisal
- District: Bhola
- Upazila: Char Fasson

Government
  - Type: Local Government
  - Body: Union Parishad
  - Chairman: Al Emran Prince (Bangladesh Awami league)

Area
  - Total: 31.83 km^{2} (12.29 sq mi)

Population (2011)
  - Total: 18,562
  - Density: 580/km^{2} (1,500/sq mi)
  - Male: 9,053
  - Male density: 280/km^{2} (730/sq mi)
  - Female: 9,509
  - Female density: 300/km^{2} (780/sq mi)
- Time zone: UTC+6 (BST)
- Administrative Department code: 10 09 25 13
- Website: abdullahpurup.bhola.gov.bd

Abdullahpur (Bengali: আব্দুল্লাহপুর) is a union territory of Char Fasson Upazila in Bhola district in Bangladesh.

== Area ==
The area of Abdullahpur Union is 7,865 acres.

== Administrative Structure ==
Abubakarpur Union is a union of Char Fasson Upazila. Administrative activities of this union are under Char Fassion police Station. It is part of Bhola-4 constituency 118 of the National Assembly.

== Population Data ==
According to the 2011 census, the total population of Abubakarpur Union is 18,562. Of these, 9,053 are males and 9,509 are females. The total number of families is 3,975.

== Education ==
According to the 2011 census, Abubakarpur Union has an average literacy rate of 43.9%.

== See also ==
- Unions of Bangladesh
- Abubakarpur Union
- Char Madras Union
