= Abhaynil =

- Location in Bangladesh
- Coordinates: 22°35′N 90°17′E
- Country: Bangladesh
- Division: Barisal Division
- District: Jhalokati District
- Time zone: UTC+6 (Bangladesh Time)

Abhaynil is a village in Jhalokati District in the Barisal Division of southern-central Bangladesh.
