= Sugandha River =

Location
- Country: Bangladesh
- Districts: Barisal, Jhalokati

Physical characteristics
- Length: 21 mi (34 km)

Sugandha River is a river in Bangladesh in the Barisal and Jhalokati districts. The length of the river is 21 km, and the average width is 400m. The identification number of the river given by the Bangladesh Water Development Board is River No. 377 in the south-western region, and the flow type is perennial.

== Flow ==
The Sugandha originates from the Kirtankhola River flowing in the Dapadapiya Union area of Nalchiti Upazila in Jhalokati District. The river then flows through Magra, Nalchiti Municipality, Kulkati and Ponabalia Unions and onwards through Gabkhan Dhansindri Union in Jhalokati Sadar Upazila of Jhalokati District and discharges into Bishkhali River. The downstream side is wider than the river upstream. The river is flooded all year round and small boats ply. However, during the Monsoon, the flow of water in the river increases and the river banks are flooded. The river is affected by low tide. This river is recognized as a first class waterway by the Bangladesh Inland Water Transport Authority.

== History ==
In November 2021, a ship exploded at a depot on the river operated by the Padma Oil Company killing one and injuring seven others.

In December 2021, a large ferry fire occurred on the river near the town of Jhalokati, killing 41 people and injuring more than 100 others.

== See also ==
- List of rivers in Bangladesh
