= Pakmahar =

- Location in Bangladesh
- Coordinates: 22°40′N 90°8′E
- Country: Bangladesh
- Division: Barisal Division
- District: Jhalakati District
- Jhalakati Sadar Upozilla: Keora Union
- Time zone: UTC+6 (Bangladesh Time)

Pakmahar is a village in Jhalakati District in the Barisal Division of southwestern Bangladesh.

== See also ==
- List of villages in Bangladesh
