= Dhanshiri River =

Coordinates: 22.5935°N 90.1645°E

- Location of mouth

Location
- Country: Bangladesh
- District: Jhalokati District

The Dhanshiri is located in the Jhalokati District of Bangladesh. Over time, it has become narrower than it once was.

== Significance ==
Local lore suggests that poet Jibanananda Das had a maternal uncle in Bamankathi village, now part of today's Rajapur Upazila. During his childhood visits, he fell in love with the natural beauty of the Dhanshiri River. He poignantly referenced it in his poem "Ābāra āsiba phirē" (I will come back again):

I will come back again to Bengal, to this Dhansiri riverside
Maybe not as a man — but a shalik, or white-crest kite;
Or a dawn crow maybe, new-rice-time, in misty flight
To this jackfruit-tree-shade one Kartik day will glide.
