= Maqsudullah =

Bangladeshi Islamic scholar

Mawlana Hafiz Maqsudullah Pir Saheb Talgachhia
- মকসুদুল্লাহ

Personal life
- Born: 1883 Talgachhia, Jhalakathi, Backergunge District, Bengal Presidency
- Died: 1961 (aged 77–78) Talgachhia, Bakerganj District, East Pakistan
- Resting place: Talgachhia Darbar Sharif
- Education: Kachua Madrasa; Darul Uloom Deoband

Religious life
- Religion: Islam
- Denomination: Sunni
- Jurisprudence: Hanafi
- Tariqa: Chishti
- Movement: Deobandi

Muslim leader
- Teacher: Saeed Ahmad Kalkini; Ali Ahmad Hasanpuri
- Disciple of: Ashraf Ali Thanwi
- Arabic name
- Personal (Ism): Maqṣūd Ullāh مقصود الله
- Patronymic (Nasab): ibn Thanāʾ Ullāh ibn Ḥijr Ullāh بن ثناء الله بن حجر الله
- Epithet (Laqab): Talgasiar Pīr Ṣāḥeb তালগাছিয়ার পীর সাহেব
- Toponymic (Nisba): al-Ghāzī الغازي al-Barīsālī البريسالي

Maqṣūd Ullāh ibn Thanāʾ Ullāh ibn Ḥijr Ullāh al-Ghāzī (Arabic: مقصود الله بن ثناء الله بن حجر الله الغازي; 1883–1961), commonly known as Maqsudullah (Bengali: মকসুদুল্লাহ), was a Bengali Deobandi Islamic scholar best known as the inaugural Pir of Talgasia Darbar Sharif. He was a disciple of Ashraf Ali Thanwi, and founded numerous qaumi madrasas in the Greater Barisal region.

== Early life and family ==
Maqsudullah was born in 1883 to a Bengali Muslim family of Ghazis in the village of Talgasia, Jhalakathi, then located under the Backergunge District of the Bengal Presidency. His father, Moulvi Ghazi Sanaullah, died in 1898 whilst returning from the Hajj pilgrimage and so Maqsudullah was mostly raised by his mother, Amena Khatun, and his paternal grandfather, Moulvi Ghazi Hijrullah.

== Education ==
Maqsudullah completed the memorisation of the Qur'an at an early age. His grandfather then took him to the nearby Kachua Madrasah where he entrusted him to the supervision of Saeed Ahmad of Kalkini. After completing his studies in Kachua, Ahmad instructed Maqsudullah to travel to Hindustan and enrol at the Darul Uloom Deoband seminary. Maqsudullah left for Deoband in 1906, where he spent several years attaining further Islamic studies. Among the other Barisali students at Deoband during his time were Zainul Abedin, Muhammad Yasin, Mansur Ahmad and Fajruddin. Maqsudullah became a student and murid of Ashraf Ali Thanwi. Thanwi later sent him to study under Ali Ahmad of Hasanpur. After spending some time studying in Hasanpur and Saharanpur, Maqsudullah returned to Deoband in 1916 where he received khilafat (spiritual succession) from Thanwi within a few days in the four tariqas.

== Career ==
Maqsudullah returned to Bengal in 1919. He was later appointed as the principal of Kachua Madrasa for many years. He then established the Madrasa-e-Ashrafia Emdadia in his ancestral village of Talgacchia, one of the early qaumi institutions in the Greater Barisal region and based on the Dars-i Nizami curriculum. He also founded a mosque adjacent to the madrasa known as Baitul Mamoor. Maqsudullah then went on to establish many more madrasas in Barisal such as Ashraful Uloom Barisal, Latabunia Madrasa, Kaikhali Madrasa and the Paikkhali Maqsudul Uloom Madrasa in Bhandaria.

On 13 December 1947, a consultation conference was held at the Chawkbazar Jame Ebadullah Mosque presided by Syed Mahmud Mustafa. The conference was attended by the major ulama of Greater Barisal including Maqsudullah of Talgasia who assisted in the establishment of the Mahmudia Madrasa.

== Death ==
Maqsudullah died in 1961, and was buried in the Talgasia Darbar Sharif. He was succeeded as pir by his descendants such as Shahidullah Ashrafi.

== See also ==
- Abdur Rahim (scholar)
- Delwar Hossain Sayeedi
- Nesaruddin Ahmad, founding Pir of Sarsina
- Syed Fazlul Karim, former Pir of Charmonai
