= Bhitabaria Union =

Bhitabaria
- Union
- Location in Bangladesh
- Country: Comilla Bangladesh
- Division: Barisal Division
- District: Pirojpur District
- Upazilas: Bhandaria Upazila

Area
  - Total: 18.77 km^{2} (7.25 sq mi)

Population (2001)
  - Total: 15,361
- Time zone: UTC+6 (BST)

Bhitabaria Union is a union, the smallest administrative body of Bangladesh, located in Bhandaria Upazila, Pirojpur District, Bangladesh. The total population is 15,361.

Village Development Committees in Bhitabaria increased economic development.
