= Shahjahan Omar =

Bangladeshi politician

- শাহজাহান ওমর

Minister of State for Law, Justice and Parlimemtary Affairs
- In office 7 April 2003 – 29 October 2006
- Prime Minister: Khaleda Zia
- Preceded by: Abdus Sattar Bhuiyan
- Succeeded by: M. Fazlul Haque

Member of the Bangladesh Parliament for Jhalokati-1
- In office 10 January 2024 – 6 August 2024
- Preceded by: Bazlul Haque Haroon
- Succeeded by: Rafiqul Islam Jamal
- In office 28 October 2001 – 27 October 2006
- Preceded by: Anwar Hossain Manju
- Succeeded by: Bazlul Haque Haroon
- In office 5 March 1991 – 30 March 1996
- Preceded by: Jahangir Kabir
- Succeeded by: Anwar Hossain Manju

Personal details
- Born: 24 December 1947 (age 78) Rajapur, East Bengal, Pakistan
- Party: Bangladesh Awami League (since 2023)
- Other political affiliations: Bangladesh Nationalist Party (till 2023)
- Awards: Bir Uttom

Military service
- Allegiance: Pakistan (Before 1971); Bangladesh
- Branch/service: Pakistan Army; Bangladesh Army
- Years of service: 1968 - 1974
- Rank: Major
- Unit: Judge Advocate General
- Commands: Company Commander of Sector – IX; Additional JAG of Army Headquarters; JAG of 9th Infantry Division
- Battles/wars: Bangladesh Liberation War

Shahjahan Omar (born 24 December 1947) is a Bangladeshi politician and a former state minister for law. He is a retired major of the Bangladesh Army and was awarded Bir Uttom. He is a four-term Jatiya Sangsad member representing the Jhalokati-1 constituency as a member of the Bangladesh Awami League.

== Early life ==
Omar was born on 24 December 1947 to Lalmon Habib (d. 2006). He passed S.S.C. from Rajapur High School in 1964. In 1966 he passed H.S.C. from Brojomohun College. He was admitted into the University of Dhaka but dropped out in 1967. In 1997 he obtained a Bar at Law degree from Lincoln's Inn.

== Military career ==
He joined the Pakistan Army in 1967. In 1969, he was promoted to the rank of lieutenant. He was posted to Kharian Cantonment. He was promoted to the rank of captain in 1970. He escaped from Pakistan on 14 August 1971 and joined the Liberation War. He was posted to Sector-9. He was awarded Bir Uttam for his bravery in the war. After the war, he joined the Bangladesh Army. He was promoted to the rank of major in 1973. He retired from the army in 1974.

== Political career ==
=== Bangladesh Nationalist Party ===
Omar was elected to the parliament as a candidate of the Bangladesh Nationalist Party from Jhalokati-1 in the general elections of 1979, 1991, 1996, and 2001. He served as the state minister of law in the third Khaleda ministry. In 2001, his supporters attacked minority Hindu populations in Jhalakati-1 to intimidate them from voting against him.

On 27 October 2007, the Anti-Corruption Commission (ACC) sued Omar on corruption charges. On 14 May 2008, he was sentenced to 13 years' imprisonment by a special court in Dhaka. The Bangladesh High Court acquitted him in August 2010. In September 2014, the Bangladesh Supreme Court allowed the ACC to start the process to appeal the High Court verdict.

=== Bangladesh Awami League ===
Omar served as the vice-chairman of BNP. He resigned from the party on 30 November 2023 and, on the same day, earned the nomination from the arch-rival Awami League party to compete as a candidate for the membership of the Jhalokati-1 constituency at the 2024 Bangladeshi general election. Later, he was expelled from all the BNP posts.

After the fall of the Sheikh Hasina-led Awami League government, his residence and car were vandalized by activists of the Bangladesh Nationalist Party. He was arrested by Bangladesh Police after he went to file a complaint against the vandalism. He was then shown arrested in a murder case over the death of a protestor against Sheikh Hasina in police action.

== Personal life ==
Omar is married to Mehjabin Farzana Omar, and they have a son, Adnan Omar.
