= Aslampur Union =

Union of Bhola District

Aslampur Union আছলামপুর ইউনিয়ন
- Union
- 2 No. Aslampur Union Parishad
- Location within Bangladesh
- Country: Bangladesh
- Division: Barisal
- District: Bhola
- Upazila: Char Fasson

Government
  - Type: Local Government
  - Body: Union Council
  - Chairman: AKM Sirajul Islam (Bangladesh Awami league)

Area
  - Total: 33.52 km^{2} (12.94 sq mi)

Population (2011)
  - Total: 35,684
  - Density: 1,100/km^{2} (2,800/sq mi)
  - Male: 17,731
  - Male density: 530/km^{2} (1,400/sq mi)
  - Female: 17,731
  - Female density: 570/km^{2} (1,500/sq mi)
- Demonym: Aslampuri
- Time zone: UTC+6 (BST)
- Postcode: 83 32
- Administrative Department code: 10 09 25 19
- Website: aslampurup.bhola.gov.bd

Aslampur (Bengali: আছলামপুর) is a union territory of Char Fasson Upazila in Bhola district in Bangladesh. It is the second largest union in Char Fasson.

== Area ==
The area of Aslampur Union is 6,284 acres.

== Administrative Structure ==
Aslampur Union is second union in order of administrative numbering of all the unions under Char Fasson Upazila. Administrative activities of this union are under Char Fashion Police Station. It is part of Bhola-4 constituency 118 of the National Assembly.

== Population Data ==
According to the 2011 census, the total population of Aslampur Union is 35,684. Of these, 18,631 are males and 18,953 are females. The total number of families is 6,391.

== Education ==
According to the 2011 census, Aslampur Union has an average literacy rate of 53.6%.

== See also ==
Abubakarpur Union
