= Bazlul Haque Haroon =

Bangladeshi politician

- বজলুল হক হারুন
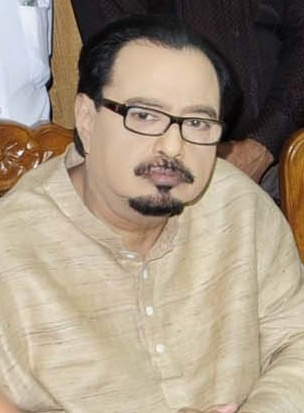
- Haroon in 2018

Member of the Bangladesh Parliament for Jhalokati-1
- In office 29 December 2008 – 30 January 2024
- Preceded by: Shahjahan Omar
- Succeeded by: Shahjahan Omar

Personal details
- Born: 1 March 1954 (age 71)
- Political party: Bangladesh Awami League

Bazlul Haque Haroon (born 1 March 1954) is a Bangladesh Awami League politician and a former Jatiya Sangsad member representing the Jhalokati-1 constituency since 2008.

== Early life ==
Haroon was born on 1 March 1954. He holds B.A. and M.A. degrees.

== Career ==
Haroon was elected to Parliament in 2008 and re-elected on 5 January 2014 from Jhalokati-1 as a Bangladesh Awami League candidate. He is a Member of Board of Directors of Premier Bank Limited.

On 30 November 2023, Haroon lost the party nomination to Shahjahan Omar for the candidacy at the 2023 Bangladeshi general election competing for the Jhalokati-1 constituency.
