= Abubakarpur Union =

Union of Bhola District

Abubakarpur Union আবুবকরপুর ইউনিয়ন
- Union
- 17 No. Abubakarpur Union Parishad
- Location within Bangladesh
- Coordinates: 22°9′22.000″N 90°47′28.000″E
- Country: Bangladesh
- Division: Barisal
- District: Bhola
- Upazila: Char Fasson

Government
  - Type: Local Government
  - Body: Union Council
  - Chairman: Md. Siraj Jomaddar (Bangladesh Awami league)

Area
  - Total: 40.9 km^{2} (15.8 sq mi)

Population (2011)
  - Total: 12,302
  - Density: 300/km^{2} (780/sq mi)
  - Male: 6,032
  - Male density: 140/km^{2} (360/sq mi)
  - Female: 6,270
  - Female density: 160/km^{2} (410/sq mi)
- Time zone: UTC+6 (BST)
- Administrative Department code: 10 09 25 11
- Website: abubakarpurup.bhola.gov.bd

Abubakarpur is a union territory of Char Fasson Upazila in Bhola district in Bangladesh.

== Area ==
The area of Abubakarpur Union is 10,108 acres.

== Administrative structure ==
Abubakarpur Union is a union of Char Fasson Upazila. Administrative activities of this union are under Dular Hat police Station. It is part of Bhola-4 constituency 118 of the National Assembly.

== Population data ==
According to the 2011 census, the total population of Abubakarpur Union is 12,302. Of these, 6,032 are males and 6270 are females. The total number of families is 2,848.

== Education ==
According to the 2011 census, Abubakarpur Union has an average literacy rate of 56.7%.

== See also ==
- Abdullahpur Union
