= MV Shourav =

MV Shourav was a ferry that sunk in the Buriganga river of Bangladesh on 28 February 2008, killing at least 39 people.
