= Char Madraj Union =

Union of Bhola District

Char Madraj Union চর মাদ্রাজ ইউনিয়ন
- Union
- 3 No. Char Madraj Union Parishad
- Location within Bangladesh
- Coordinates: 22°9′22.000″N 90°47′28.000″E
- Country: Bangladesh
- Division: Barisal
- District: Bhola
- Upazila: Char Fasson

Government
  - Type: Local Government
  - Body: Union Council
  - Chairman: Mojammel Hoque Jomaddar (Bangladesh Awami league)

Area
  - Total: 45.1 km^{2} (17.4 sq mi)

Population (2011)
  - Total: 33,229
  - Density: 740/km^{2} (1,900/sq mi)
  - Male: 16,676
  - Male density: 365/km^{2} (950/sq mi)
  - Female: 16,553
  - Female density: 370/km^{2} (960/sq mi)
- Demonym: Madraji
- Time zone: UTC+6 (BST)
- Postcode: 8340
- Administrative Department code: 10 09 25 38
- Website: charmadrajup.bhola.gov.bd

Char Madraj (Bengali: চর মাদ্রাজ) is a union territory of Char Fasson Upazila in Bhola district in Bangladesh.

== Area ==
The area of Char Madraj Union is 11,144 acres.

== Administrative Structure ==
Char Madraj Union is a union of Char Fasson Upazila. Administrative activities of this union are under Char Fasson police Station. It is part of Bhola-4 constituency 118 of the National Assembly.

== Population Data ==
According to the 2011 census, the total population of Char Madraj Union is 33,229. Of these, 16,653 are males and 16,553 are females. The total number of families is 7,045.

== Education ==
According to the 2011 census, Char Madraj Union has an average literacy rate of 40.4%.

== See also ==
- Unions of Bangladesh
