= Sinking of ML Rabit Al Hasan =

2021 maritime incident in Bangladesh

- Date: 4 April 2021; 5 years ago
- Time: 6:00 pm BST
- Location: Shitalakshya River, Bangladesh
- Cause: Collision with MV SKL-3
- Deaths: 35
- Missing: 2

ML Rabit Al Hasan was a Bangladesh double-decker passenger ferry that sank on 4 April 2021 in the Shitalakshya River in Narayanganj District near Dhaka. The ship was carrying more than 50 passengers and crew of which 35 died.

The vessel sank after it collided with the cargo vessel, MV SKL-3, in the Sitalakkhya River. Dhaka Tribune reported that the cargo vessel fled the scene after the collision. The coast guard detained 14 staff and the executor cargo vessel anchored in Meghna River, at Gazaria, Munshiganj district after four days of the incident.
