= Aminabad Union =

Union of Bhola District

Aminabad Union আমিনাবাদ ইউনিয়ন
- Union
- 5 No. Aminabad Union Parishad
- Location within Bangladesh
- Coordinates: 22°10′46.999″N 90°43′5.002″E
- Country: Bangladesh
- Division: Barisal
- District: Bhola
- Upazila: Char Fasson

Government
  - Type: Local Government
  - Body: Union Council
  - Chairman: (Bangladesh Awami league)

Area
  - Total: 2,487 km^{2} (960 sq mi)

Population (2011)
  - Total: 17,461
  - Density: 700/km^{2} (1,800/sq mi)
  - Male: 8,529
  - Male density: 340/km^{2} (880/sq mi)
  - Female: 8,972
  - Female density: 360/km^{2} (930/sq mi)
- Time zone: UTC+6 (BST)
- Postcode: 8340
- Administrative Department code: 10 09 25 15
- Website: aminabadup.bhola.gov.bd

Aminabad is a union territory of Char Fasson Upazila in Bhola district in Bangladesh.

== Area ==
The area of Aminabad Union is 6,145 acres.

== Administrative Structure ==
Aminabad Union is a union of Char Fasson Upazila. Administrative activities of this union are under Char Fasson police Station. It is part of Bhola-4 constituency 118 of the National Assembly.

== Population Data ==
According to the 2011 census, the total population of Aminabad Union is 17,461 Of these, 8,532 are males and 8,971 are females. The total number of families is 3902.

== Education ==
According to the 2011 census, Char Madraj Union has an average literacy rate of 64.9%

== See also ==
- Unions of Bangladesh
