= Amtali Union =

Amtali Union is an administrative subdivision in Bangladesh. It may refer to:

- Amtali Union, Baghaichhari, a union in Rangamati District
- Amtali Union, Matiranga, a union in Khagrachhari District
