= Kathalia Upazila =

Kathalia কাঠালিয়া
- Upazila
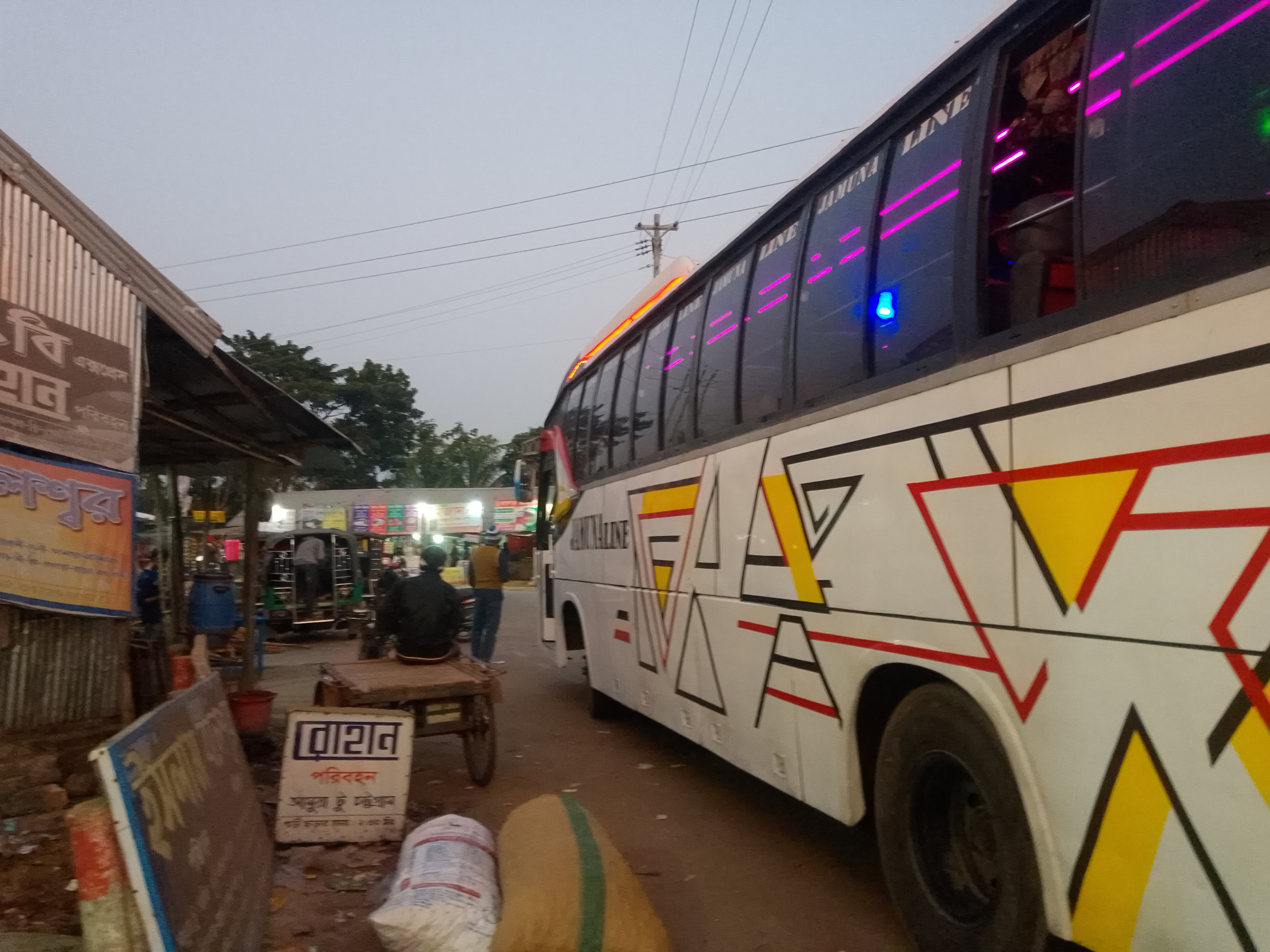
- Amua Zero Point, Kathalia

- Coordinates: 22°24′N 90°7.5′E
- Country: Bangladesh
- Division: Barisal Division
- District: Jhalokati District

Area
  - Total: 152.08 km^{2} (58.72 sq mi)

Population (2022)
  - Total: 111,663
  - Density: 734.24/km^{2} (1,901.7/sq mi)
- Time zone: UTC+6 (BST)
- Postal code: 8430
- Website: kathalia.jhalakathi.gov.bd

Kathalia (Bengali: কাঠালিয়া) is an upazila of Jhalokati District in Barisal Division, Bangladesh.

== Geography ==
Kathalia is located at 22.4000°N 90.1250°E. It has 23,904 households and a total area of 152.08 km^{2}. Kathalia is bounded by Bhandaria upazila of Pirojpur district to the north, Bamna upazila of Barguna district and Mathbaria upazila of Pirojpur to the south, Bishkhali river to the east and Bhandaria upazila and Mathbaria upazila of Pirojpur district to the west. The main river of this upazila is Bishkhali. Numerous canals originating from the Bishkhali river— flowing on the eastern side of the upazila— are spread like a net in this area. Most of the lands of this upazila are low lying which are flooded by the tide of Bishkhali river. Notable bill is Chhonauta.

=== Rivers ===
The notable rivers of Kathalia Upazila are:

- Bishkhali River The main river of this area is Bishkhali River. It is the continuation of the Padma's tributary river named Ichamoti River. The Padma divided into two flows at about 52 km. far from Goalundo Ghat. One of them took the name Ichamoti and by flowing over Faridpur and Madaripur District it falls on Tetulia River at the north–south area of Barishal.It takes the name Kirtonkhola at 5 km. north from Barishal; at Nalchity Upazila it is named Nalchity River. At the point of entering into Jhalakathi Sadar it named Bishkhali.The total length of the river is 96 km. The average width of the river from its origin to first 30 km is about 1 km and the rest is about 2 km. The average depth is about 16m. The river is fully influenced by tide and ebb. Water is collected at Betna, Bamna, Barguna and Patharghata stations to examine the salinity status of the river. It shows erosional tendency and the towns and ports, e.g. Betagi, Amua, Bamna are under threat to its erosion. Bangladesh water development board (BWDB) has constructed an embankment to prevent flood and salinity. Deposition process and char (island) formation is active at various parts of the river. Some of the chars are under settlement and cultivation. The Badankhalikone and Khakdone, two of the offshoots of the Bishkhali are about to die due to lack of sufficient flow. Jhalokati, Betagi, Kathalia, Bamna, Barguna, Patharghata, Phuljhuri are some important places on the north bank of the river.
- Sugondha River

== History ==
=== Naming ===
It is said that during the British rule, the market of national fruit of Bangladesh jackfruit used to be held at Kathalia. That is why it was named Kathalia. However, there are differences of opinion about the naming. In the past, carpenters used to come from different places to collect wood in this area. They were called 'Kathuria'. Many people think that the name Kathalia was taken from that name. Besides, many elders think that Kathalia Upazila has been named after the yellow egg-laden Kathali shrimp found in various canals and rivers of the area.

=== Founding ===
This area was part of Syedpur Pargana during the Mughal period before the British rule. There was a masonry building in Kalakopa village near Aurabunia constructed by Bayram Khan but it was eventually destroyed by river erosion. Kathalia, Bhandaria, Bamna, Betagi, Mathbaria and Bakerganj were under the pargana through a Super of Naib. At one time Kathalia-Pirojpur was under sub-division. At that time Kathalia-Bhandaria was a constituency. Later Jhalokati subdivision was developed and then Kathalia-Jhalokati subdivision came under it and Kathalia-Rajapur was managed as a constituency. At present there was a Jalthana in Amua Union under Kathalia Upazila, among the administrative offices there were food warehouses, hospitals, Sub-Registrar's office at Amua. But later the sub-registry office was shifted to Kathalia Sadar and the food warehouse and hospital existed at Amua. The Jalthana was shifted to Kathalia as there was a nuisance of thieves and robbers, miscreants in the area. In this context, Kathalia police station was established in 1936. Upazila was formed in 1986.

=== Independence War ===
The independence-loving people of Kathalia spontaneously participated in the war in 1971. Through the mass uprising of 1969 and the election of 1970, the then MPs — Md. Enayet Hossain Khan and Md. Nurul Islam Bhandari took part in the war by organizing the people of Kathalia. After the declaration of independence on 26 March 1971, the fighters of Kathalia migrated to India and the Sundarbans and from there formed groups and participated in the war. The Pakistan army fought several battles with the fighters. On 2 November 1971, the fighters attacked the Kathalia police station and took away all the weapons of the police station. On 25 May 1971, 40 people were reportedly killed in a massacre in the Banshbunia area of Amua Union. On 23 June 1971, 29 people were killed in a brutal massacre by the Pak aggressors in the Aurabunia area of Kathalia. Besides, 5 more people were killed in the attack of Pak aggressors in the area adjacent to Chader-Hat Bazar in Kathalia.

== Demographics ==
Religions in Kathalia Upazila (2022)
Religion	Percent
Islam	86.87%
Hinduism	13.11%
Other or not stated	0.02%

According to the 2022 Bangladeshi census, Kanthalia Upazila had 28,903 households and a population of 111,663. 9.49% of the population were under 5 years of age. Kanthalia had a literacy rate (age 7 and over) of 81.69%: 82.54% for males and 80.95% for females, and a sex ratio of 89.95 males for every 100 females. 36,970 (33.11%) lived in urban areas.

According to the 2011 Census of Bangladesh, Kathalia Upazila had 50,315 households and a population of 124,271. 27,049 (21.77%) were under 10 years of age. Kathalia has a literacy rate (age 7 and over) of 68.8%, compared to the national average of 51.8%, and a sex ratio of 1055 females per 1000 males. 10,161 (8.18%) lived in urban areas.

According to the 1991 Bangladesh census, Kathalia had a population of 123,298. Males constitute 50.02% of the population, and females 49.98%. The population aged 18 or over was 63,714. Kathalia has an average literacy rate of 50.9% (7+ years), compared to the national average of 32.4%.

== Administration ==
Kathalia Upazila is divided into six Union Councils: Amua, Awrabunia, Chenchrirampur, Kanthalia, Patikhalghata, and Shaulajalia. The union parishads are subdivided into 47 mauzas and 52 villages.

The chairman of the Upazila is Md. Emadul Haque.

=== Administrative areas ===
Union Councils
Sl. No.	Name of the Union Council	Area(Acre)
1	Chenchrirampur	8441
2	Patikhalghata	4414
3	Amua	6194
4	Kathalia	4324
5	Shoulajalia	8981
6	Awrabunia	5032

=== Villages ===
- Analbania

== Culture ==
=== Tradition ===
Many people visit here to see Kathalia built on the banks of this river in an unknown attraction. Not only them, but also some lovers of Hilsha of Bishkhali are equally attracted.

Turning the page of history, it can be seen that there was a famous zamindar named Tendur Kha in Chechrirampur union of Kathalia. He was a descendant of Sher Shah of Sa Sa Ram in Bihar. He came from Bihar and settled at Chenchrirampur in Kathalia. Various signs of Mughal period are scattered in this upazila. The historic mosque of the Jamaddar house in Awrabunia still stands tall as a symbol of the Mughal period.

=== Language ===
The people of Kathalia Upazila prefer to speak their regional language. Due to its linguistic heritage and uniqueness, the regional language of Barisal attracts the minds of the people in a special way. Due to its continuation, the people of Kathalia speak this regional language. Besides, Jari, Sari, Bhatiali, Murshidi, Lalon Geeti, Punthipath have occupied a special place in the culture of the people of this region; which is the soul of Bengali folk literature.

=== Sports and recreation ===
Due to the traditional reasons, diversity in sports and entertainment can be noticed here. Football, Hadudu, Cricket, Kabaddi, Kanamachi as well as local games are popular. Besides, boat-race is a very popular sport as it is a riverine area.

== Education ==
According to the Census-2011, the literacy rate of Kathalia Upazila is 65.3%.

Number of Educational Institution
Type of the institution	Number
College	3
Secondary School	37
Lower Secondary School	5
Government Primary School	119
Community Primary School	6
Fazil Madrasah	4
Madrasah	30

=== Educational institutions ===
Colleges of Kathalia Upazila.

- Govt. Tofazzal Hossain Manik Mia College
- Shahid Raja Degree College Amua
- Manoswita Mohila Degree College
- Shafiuddin technical college

== Economy ==
Basically, the hat-bazaars are the main center of the economy of the area. The main hats and bazaars are Amua Hat, Amua Matsya Arat, Kathalia Bazar, Aura Gorur Hat, Chencharirampur Kaikhali Hat, Aurabunia Hat, Center Hat etc. The main livelihood of the people of this upazila is agriculture. With the spread of education, many people are now working in various government and non-government jobs including teaching.

=== Natural resources ===
Horizon wide crop fields, clean air and pollution free open reservoirs-canals-marshes, rivers-canals have naturally enriched Kathalia Upazila. The fame of the delicious Hilsa found in the Bishkhali river is world famous. Fish from different canals and marshes are tapas, poya, kathali shrimp, kai, shing, pabda, magur, ayr, boal, etc. found in the river are sent to different parts of the country. Coconut and betel nuts are widely grown in the saline soil of this upazila and are one of the economic crops of the region. There is also a demand for fragrant and thin varieties, milkweed and Rajasail rice in different parts of the country.

=== Agriculture ===
Paddy is one of the important agricultural crops here. Being surrounded by numerous canals and marshes, the cultivable land of this upazila is limited. Most of the land is two or one crop as many lands are inundated with the tidal water of Bishkhali river— flowing through east-south of Kathalia upazila. Agricultural production is also not as desired. Fisheries resources are also decreasing as fishing continues with nets such as current, chargara, net etc. Among the animals, buffalo and cow are significant. Among the fruits, guava, mango and banana are notable. Agricultural production is increasing day by day due to the construction of embankment on Bishkhali river recently and the government continues to provide power tillers, improved seeds, fertilizers and agricultural materials.

=== Business and trading ===
The economy of this upazila is still rural. Mainly agricultural products like paddy, betel nut, coconut and various vegetables and fish from Bishkhali river and various canals are the main driving force of the economy here. Far from medium or heavy industry, no cottage industry exists here. Although not produced in large quantities, betel nut is the main cash crop here. Betel nut, Hilsa and shrimp of Bishkhali River are sent from this area to the other parts of the country. To meet the demand here, vegetables and other food items and daily necessities have to be brought from outer regions.

=== Banking system ===
Due to insufficient branches of the bank and lack of awareness among the locals, money is transacted at high interest rates through informal money lenders and NGO which is adversely affecting the rural economy.

=== Markets ===
List of Markets in Kathalia Upazila
Sl. No.	Name	Area (Acre)	Location
1	Amua Fisheries M arket	0.10	Amua
2	Ghosher Haat	1.65	Chonauta, Amua
3	Koikhali Haat	2.50	Koikhali, Chenchrirampur
4	Awra Haat	0.35	Awra, Kathalia
5	Morichbunia Haat	0.99	Morichbunia, Patikhalghata
6	Sikdar Haat	0.66	North Chenchri, Chenchrirampur
7	Banai Haat	0.74	Chenchrirampur, Kathalia
8	Binapani Haat	1.0227	Shoulajalia, Kathalia
9	Kochua Haat	0.66	Kochua, Shoulajalia
10	Centerer Haat	1.18	Soulajalia, Kathalia
11	Dogona Haat	0.45	Boltola, Shoulajalia
12	Awrabunia Haat	2.19	Awrabunia
13	Kathalia Bazar	0.88	Kathalia Sadar
14	Amua Haat	2.44	Chonauta, Amua
15	Tarabunia Haat	0.60	Patikhalghata

== Transport ==
The distance from the capital city of Dhaka to Kathalia is 226 km. The upazila is located 60 and 43 km south from Barisal and Jhalokati respectively. This upazila can be reached by road from Dhaka via Barisal and Jhalokati. Buses to Kathalia are available from Gabtali and Sayedabad bus stations in Dhaka. Besides, Kathalia can be reached directly from the divisional cities of Barisal, Chittagong and Khulna. Recently, Kathalia-Dhaka-Kathalia BRTC air-conditioned bus service has been launched.

== Notable personalities ==
The notable personalities of this area are:

- Maqsudullah, Islamic scholar and educationist from Talgasia village
- Nachiketa Chakraborty, famous Tollywood singer's family hails from Chenchri Rampur village in Kathalia Upazila

== Places of interest and infrastructures ==
Places of interest and infrastructures of Kathalia Upazila
Sl. No.	Name	Location
1	Masjid of Mughal Age	Awrabunia
2	HokkonNur Darbar Sharif	Shoulajalia
3	Bishkhali River	Kathalia
4	Amua Ferry Ghat	Amua
5	Upazila Parishad Eidgah Maidan	Kathalia
6	Bashbunia Slaughterhouse	Bashbunia
7	Choilar Char	Hetalbunia

=== Health ===
There is a Upazila Health Complex in this area.

== Media ==
No newspaper is published from this upazila. Almost all national dailies published from Dhaka are available by 11:00 am. Various regional newspapers published from Jhalokati and Barisal are available by 9:00 am. At present there is an online based magazine called Kathalia Barta in Kathalia.

== See also ==
- Upazilas of Bangladesh
- Districts of Bangladesh
- Divisions of Bangladesh
