= 1986 Bangladesh MV Shamia ferry incident =

1986 shipwrecking in Bangladesh

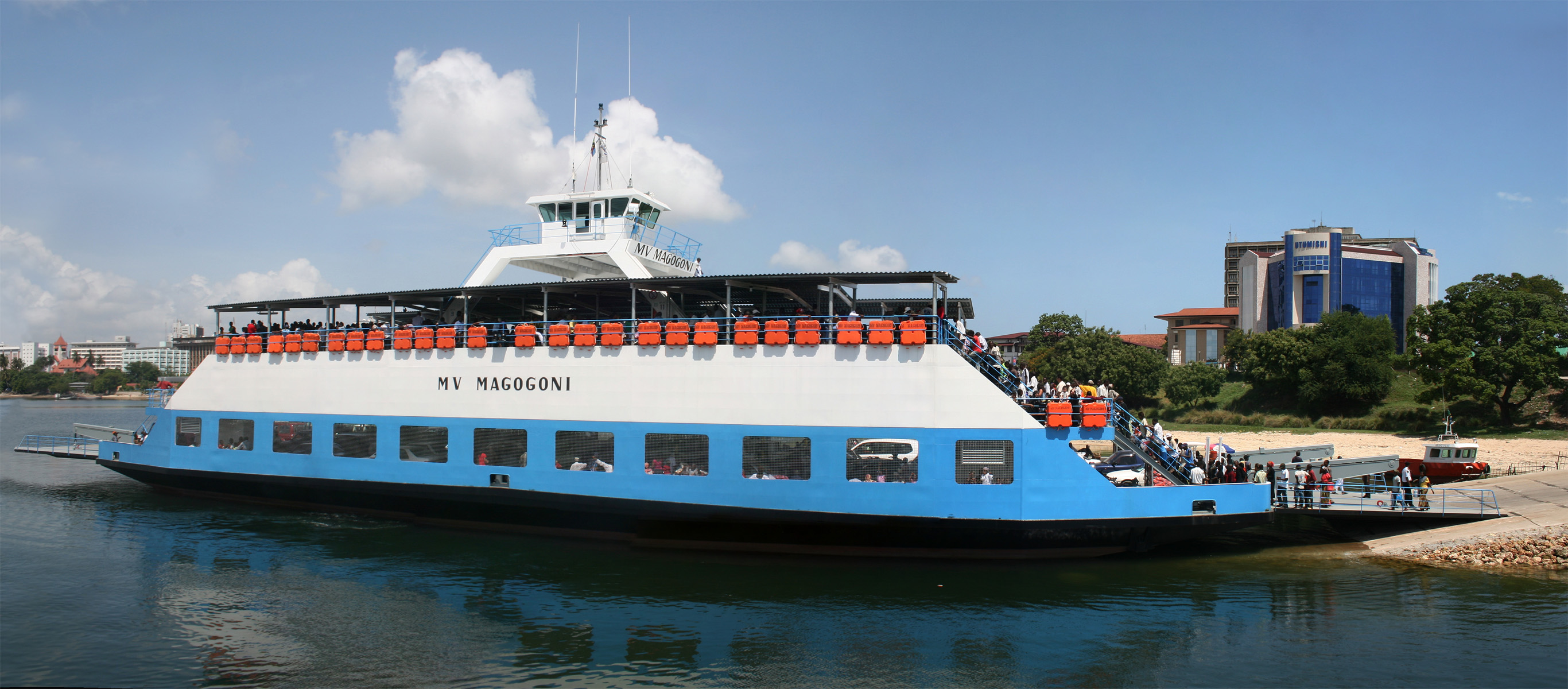
- A ferry being loaded with passengers in Dar es Salaam, Tanzania
- Date: 25 May 1986
- Location: Meghna River, Bangladesh
- Cause: Overloading and severe weather
- Participants: 1,000 – 1,500 passengers and crew
- Outcome: Boat sank
- Deaths: 600

The 1986 Bangladesh MV Shamia ferry incident refers to one of the worst maritime disasters in human history that occurred on 25 May 1986 on the Meghna River in Bangladesh, killing 600 passengers. The incident occurred when the overloaded MV Shamia, a two-decker merchant ship ferry, sank while carrying about 1,000 – 1,500 people from Bhola to Dhaka during stormy weather conditions. Initial reports cited between 40 and 240 dead with 500 missing.

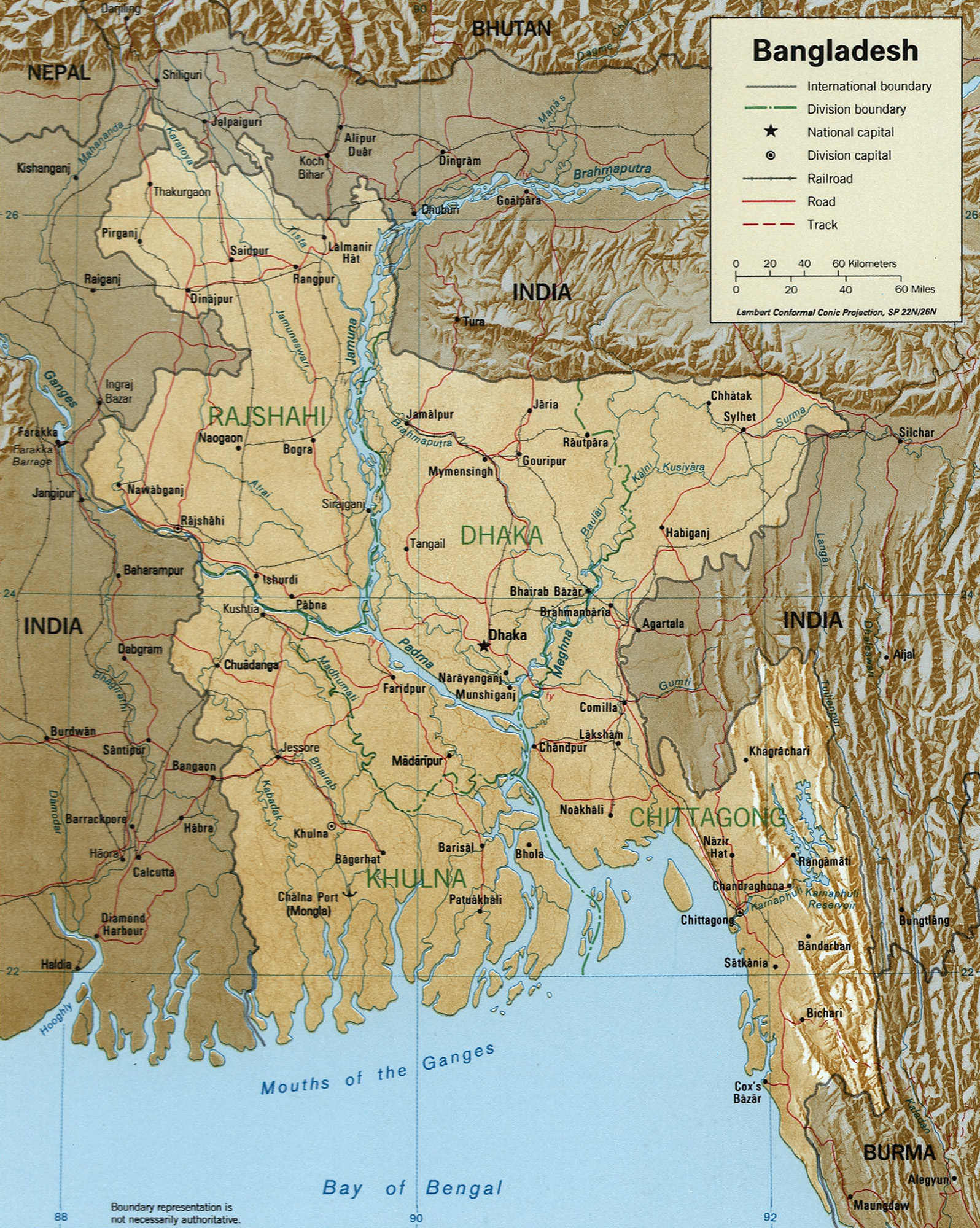
Map of Bangladesh (location of accident approx in the centre)

At the end of Ramadan, a fasting month for Muslims, many people were returning from their home cities to the capital Dhaka, after celebrating the religious holiday of Eid al-Fitr.

== Background ==
It is believed that cyclone heavily affected the capital of Bangladesh, including its adjoining areas at the time of the accident. The ferry Shamia set sail from Bhola to Dhaka with over 1,000 to 1,500 passengers despite having accommodation for 500 passengers only. Shamia capsized when strong winds struck it in one of the widest parts of the Meghna River.

The President of Bangladesh of that time, Hussain Mohammed Ershad, suspended all double-decker boats within Bangladesh jurisdiction and several officials responsible for issuing maritime-fitness certificates, were suspended for allowing the structural-defective ferries to carry passengers.
