= MV Salahuddin-2 =

MV Salahuddin-2 was a ferry that sank in the Meghna River south of Dhaka, Bangladesh, on the night of 3 May 2002, killing more than 450 people. The triple-decked ferry sank in strong winds and river currents near Shatnal, where the Meghna River meets its tributaries and often floods its banks.
