= Jhalokati =

Jhalokati ঝালকাঠি
- Town & District headquarter
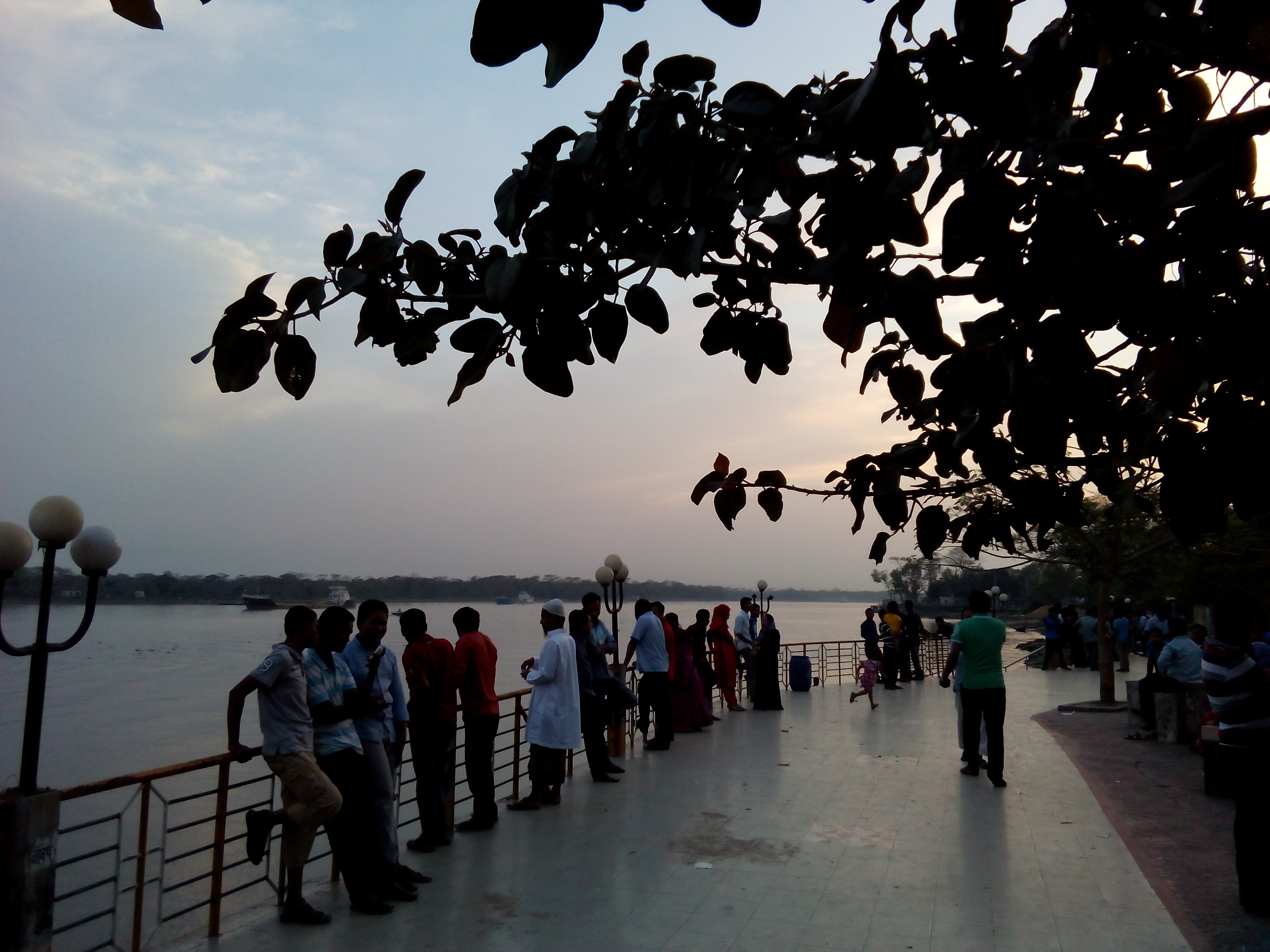
- Pouro Mini Park, Jhalokathi

- Location in Bangladesh Jhalokati (Bangladesh)
- Coordinates: 22.6386°N 90.1993°E
- Country: Bangladesh
- Division: Barisal
- District: Jhalokati
- Upazila: Jhalokati Sadar
- Municipality Established: 1875

Area
  - Total: 16.08 km^{2} (6.21 sq mi)

Population (2011)
  - Total: 54,029
  - Density: 3,360/km^{2} (8,702/sq mi)
- Time zone: UTC+6 (BST)

Jhalokati (Bengali: ঝালকাঠি) is a town in Jhalokati district in Barisal Division in southern Bangladesh. It is the administrative headquarters and the largest town of the district. The town covers an area of 16.08 square kilometres (6.21 sq mi) with a population of 54,029 as of the 2011 census.

== Demographics ==
Religions in Jhalokati (2011)
Religion	Percent
Islam	83.90%
Hinduism	16.07%
Other or not stated	0.03%

According to the 2011 Bangladesh census, Jhalokati Municipality had 12,399 households and a population of 54,029. 10,519 (19.47%) were under 10 years of age. Jhalokati had a literacy rate (age 7 and over) of 77.89%, compared to the national average of 51.8%, and a sex ratio of 963 females per 1000 males.
