= Jhalokati-1 =

Constituency of Bangladesh's Jatiya Sangsad

Coordinates: 22.57°N 90.14°E

- Constituency for the Jatiya Sangsad
- District: Jhalokati District
- Division: Barisal Division
- Electorate: 228,431 (2026)

Current constituency
- Created: 1984
- Party: Bangladesh Nationalist Party
- Member: Rafiqul Islam Jamal
- ← 124 Barisal-6 126 Jhalokati-2 →

Jhalokati-1 is a constituency represented in the Jatiya Sangsad (National Parliament) of Bangladesh since 2026 by Rafiqul Islam Jamal of the Bangladesh Nationalist Party.

== Boundaries ==
The constituency encompasses Kathalia and Rajapur upazilas.

== History ==
The constituency was created in 1984 from the Bakerganj-12 constituency when the former Bakerganj District was split into four districts: Bhola, Bakerganj, Jhalokati, and Pirojpur.

== Members of Parliament ==
Election	Member	Party
1986	Jahangir Kabir	Jatiya Party
1991	Shahjahan Omar	Bangladesh Nationalist Party
Feb 1996	Shahjahan Omar	Bangladesh Nationalist Party
Jun 1996	Anwar Hossain Manju	Jatiya Party
2001	Shahjahan Omar	Bangladesh Nationalist Party
2008	Bazlul Haque Haroon	Awami League
2024	Shahjahan Omar	Awami League
2026	Rafiqul Islam Jamal	Bangladesh Nationalist Party

== Elections ==
=== Elections in the 2020s ===
General Election 2026: Jhalokati-1
Party	Candidate	Votes	%	±%
BNP	Rafiqul Islam Jamal	62,010	49.0	N/A
Jamaat	Foyzul Haque	55,120	43.6	N/A
IAB	Ibrahim	7,744	6.1	N/A
Independent	M Moyeen Alam Firozee	593	0.5	N/A
Independent	Md. Sabbir Ahmed	345	0.3	N/A
JP(E)	Md. Kamruzzaman Khan	321	0.3	N/A
GOP	Md. Shahadat Hossain	132	0.1	N/A
JSD (Rab)	Sohrab Hossain	110	0.1	N/A
Janotar Dol	Md. Jasim Uddin Talukdar	63	0.0	N/A
Majority		6,890	5.4	N/A
Turnout		126,438	55.4	N/A
BNP gain from AL				

=== Elections in the 2010s ===
General Election 2014: Jhalokati-1
Party	Candidate	Votes	%	±%
AL	Bazlul Haque Haroon	90,127	94.7	+38.2
JP(E)	Md. Nasir Uddin	5,071	5.3	N/A
Majority		85,056	89.3	+70.5
Turnout		95,198	61.6	−21.7
AL hold				

=== Elections in the 2000s ===
General Election 2008: Jhalokati-1
Party	Candidate	Votes	%	±%
AL	Bazlul Haque Haroon	64,525	56.5	+36.7
BNP	Rafiqul Islam Jamal	43,098	37.7	−15.2
IAB	Md. Moinul Islam	5,375	4.7	N/A
Independent	A.K.M. Rezaul Karim	598	0.5	N/A
Independent	Maha Alam	353	0.3	N/A
BDB	Mohammad Abul Kasem	122	0.1	N/A
Jatiya Party (M)	Md. Rubel Howlader	121	0.1	−20.8
Majority		21,427	18.8	−13.1
Turnout		114,192	83.3	+19.2
AL gain from BNP				

General Election 2001: Jhalokati-1
Party	Candidate	Votes	%	±%
BNP	Shahjahan Omar	54,513	52.9	+21.2
Jatiya Party (M)	Anwar Hossain Manju	21,609	20.9	N/A
AL	Bazlul Haque Haroon	20,413	19.8	−9.2
IJOF	Mian Masud Zakaria	6,168	6.0	N/A
Quran Darshan Sangstha Bangladesh	S. K. Jasim Uddin	161	0.2	0.0
Independent	Moniruzzaman Golder	90	0.1	N/A
JSD	Sohrab Hossain	86	0.1	N/A
Independent	Sikder Md. Kajal	60	0.1	N/A
Bangladesh Muslim League (Jamir Ali)	Md. A. Satter Hawlader	46	0.0	N/A
Majority		32,904	31.9	+29.6
Turnout		103,146	64.1	−8.8
BNP gain from JP(E)				

=== Elections in the 1990s ===
General Election June 1996: Jhalokati-1
Party	Candidate	Votes	%	±%
JP(E)	Anwar Hossain Manju	27,812	33.9	N/A
BNP	Shahjahan Omar	26,017	31.7	−16.7
AL	Amir Hossain Amu	23,792	29.0	+5.4
IOJ	Nurul Muda	2,964	3.6	−0.8
Jamaat	Moulana Muzzamel Hossain	925	1.1	−1.6
FP	Sohrab Hossain	174	0.2	0.0
Zaker Party	Kabir Sikdar	174	0.2	−0.1
Quran Darshan Sangstha Bangladesh	S. K. Jasim Uddin	137	0.2	N/A
Gano Forum	Kabiruzzaman Mia	76	0.1	N/A
Majority		1,795	2.2	−22.6
Turnout		82,071	72.9	+29.7
JP(E) gain from BNP				

General Election 1991: Jhalokati-1
Party	Candidate	Votes	%	±%
BNP	Shahjahan Omar	33,544	48.4	
AL	Abdul Kuddus	16,357	23.6	
Independent	Nurul Islam Sikder	12,008	17.3	
IOJ	Md. Ali Hossain	3,077	4.4	
Jamaat	Moulana Mozammel Hossain	1,860	2.7	
Bangladesh Janata Party	Haider Miah	1,698	2.4	
Zaker Party	Abdus Sobhan	241	0.3	
JSD	M. A. Hannan	219	0.3	
Independent	Mozammel Hossain	168	0.2	
FP	Sohrab Hossain	123	0.2	
Independent	Golam Kabir Tang.	65	0.1	
Majority		17,187	24.8	
Turnout		69,360	43.2	
BNP gain from JP(E)				
