= Bishkhali River =

Coordinates: 21°59′N 90°00′E

Location
- Country: Bangladesh
- Division: Barisal
- Cities: Jhalokati; Barguna

Physical characteristics
- Source: Sugandha River
- Mouth: Bay of Bengal
- Length: 105 km (65 mi)

The Biskhali is a river of Bangladesh, and a continuation of Sugandha River. The 105 km (65 mi) long Biskhali empties into the Bay of Bengal.
