= Jhalokathi District =

Jhalokathi District ঝালকাঠি জেলা
- District of Bangladesh
- Jhalakathi District
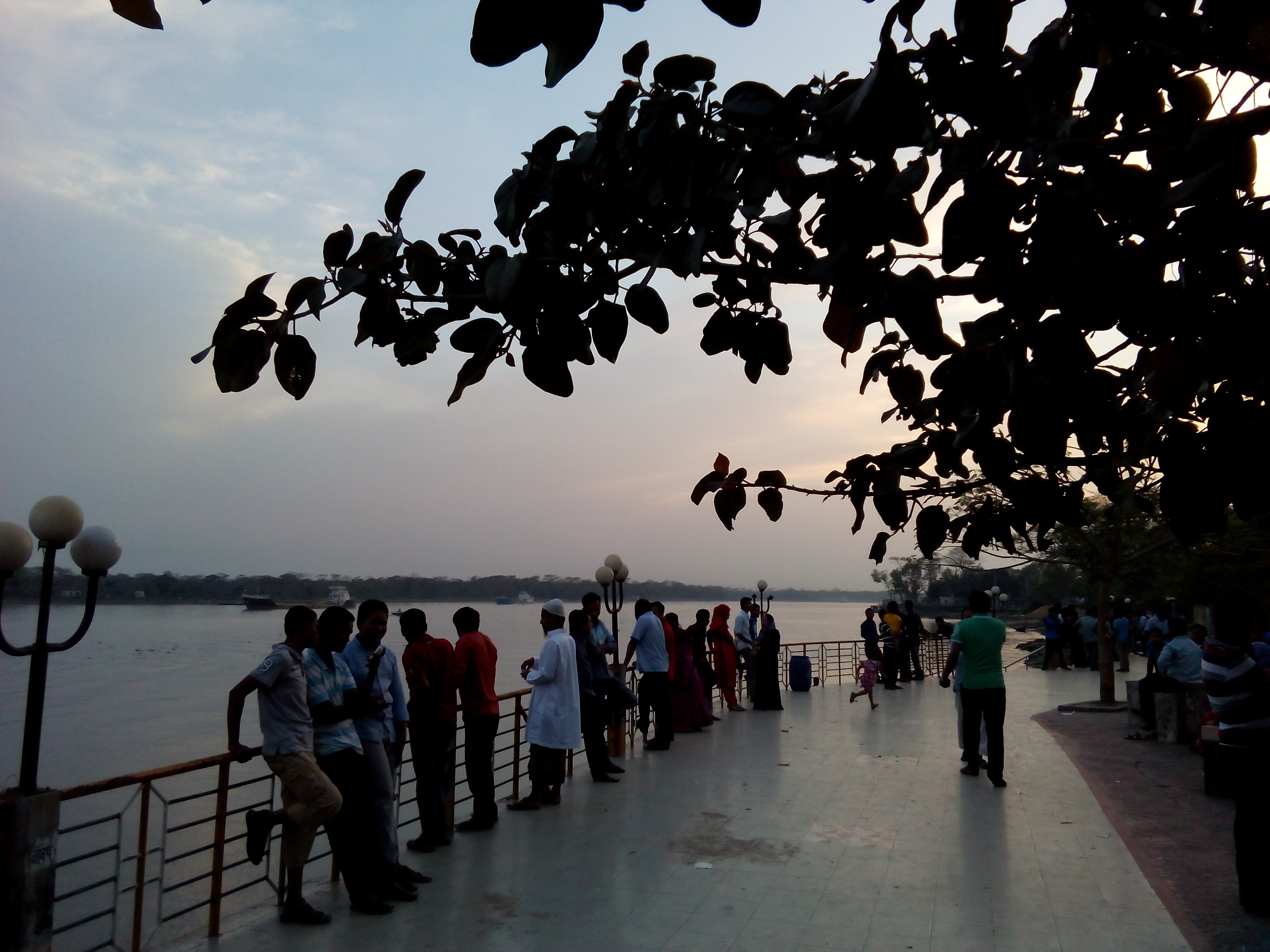
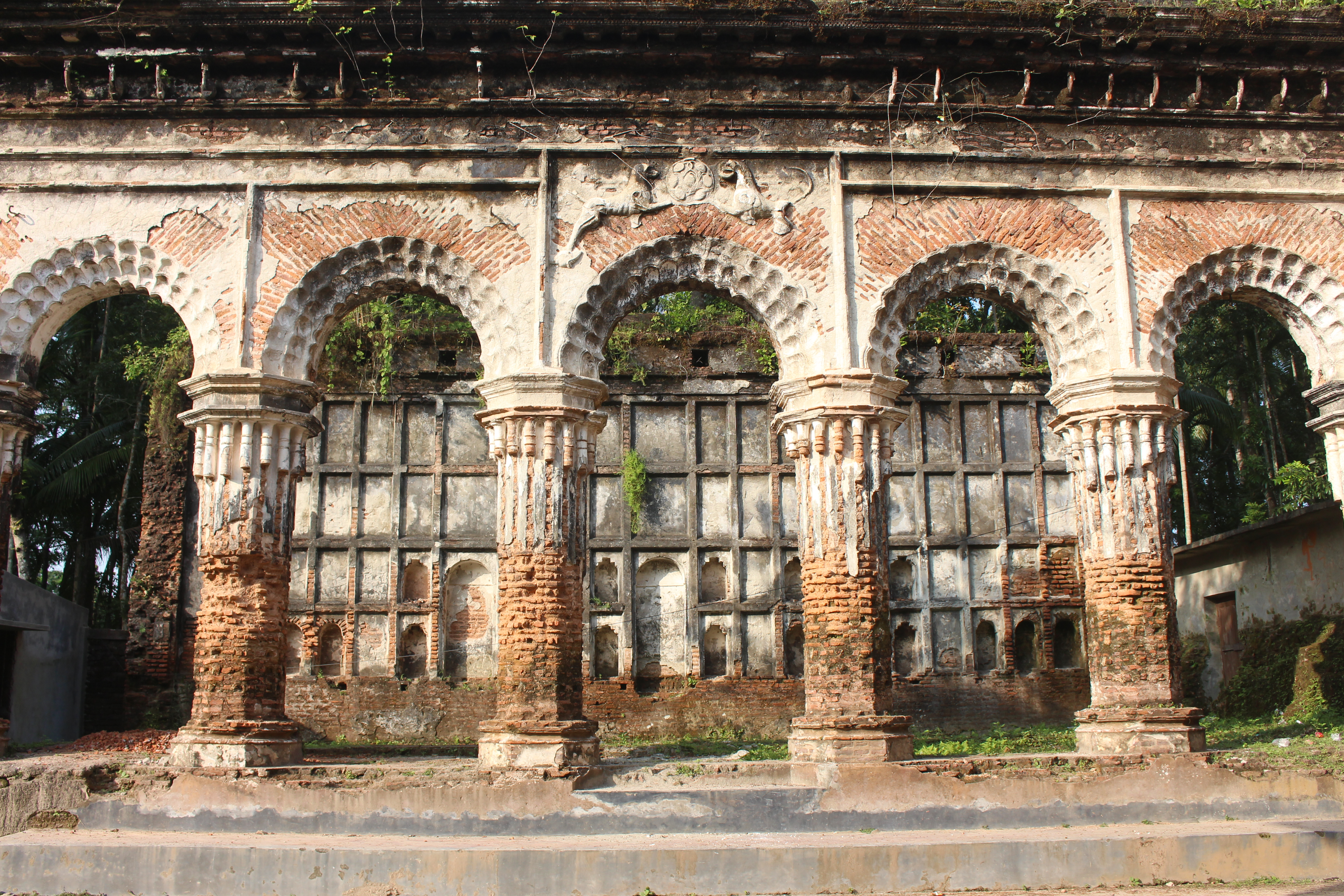
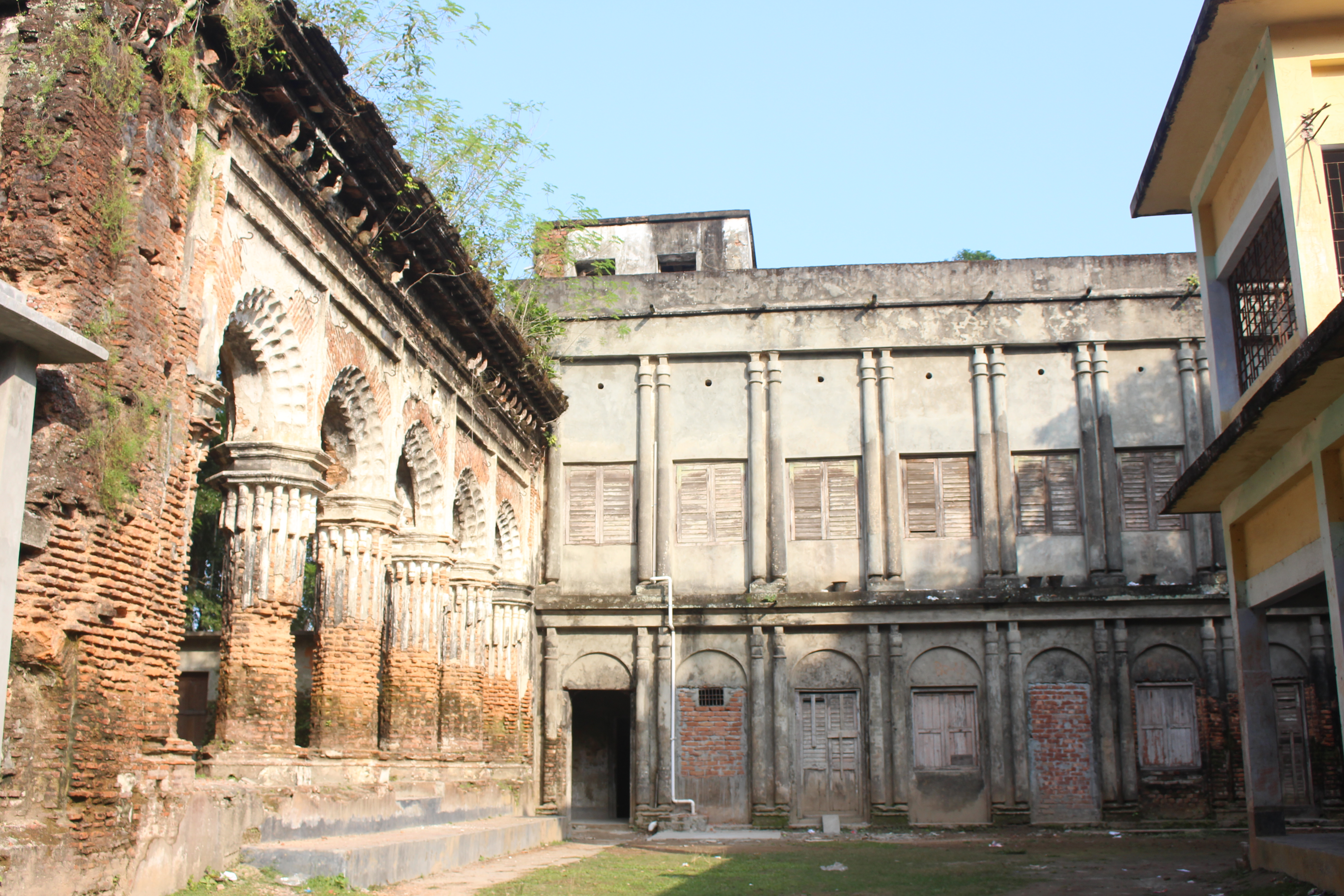
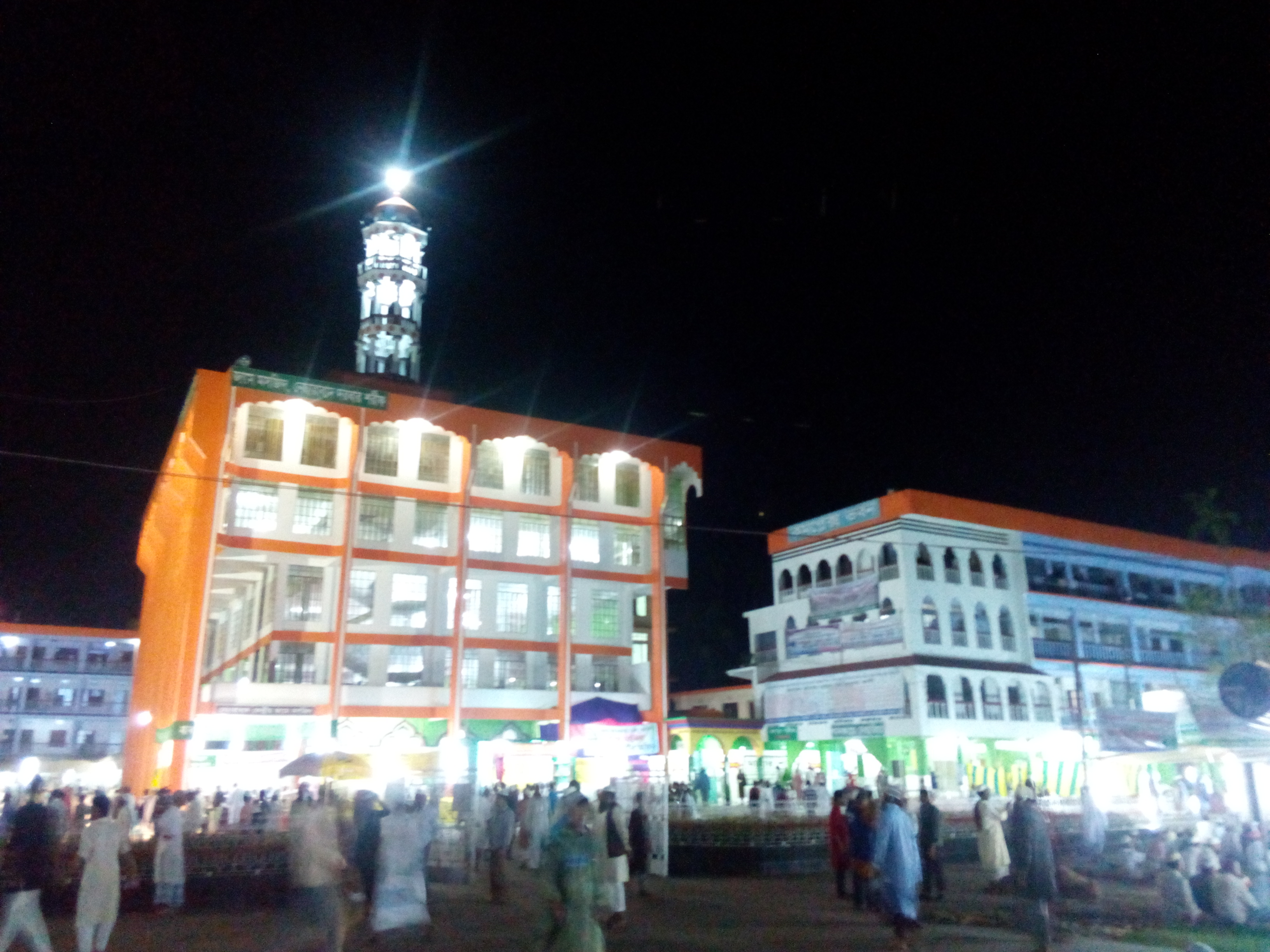
- From top: Jhalokati Sadar Road, Kirtipasha Zamindar Bari Ruins and Jhalokathi N S Kamil Madrasah Complex

- Location of Jhalokati in Bangladesh
- Interactive map of Jhalokathi District
- Coordinates: 22°34′N 90°09′E
- Country: Bangladesh
- Division: Barisal
- Established: 1984
- Headquarters: Jhalokati

Government
  - Deputy Commissioner: Md. Johar Ali

Area
  - Total: 706.76 km^{2} (272.88 sq mi)

Population (2022)
  - Total: 661,160
  - Density: 935.48/km^{2} (2,422.9/sq mi)
- Time zone: UTC+06:00 (BST)
- Postal code: 8400
- Area code: 0498
- ISO 3166 code: BD-25
- HDI (2023): 0.702 high · 4th of 22
- Website: www.jhalakathi.gov.bd

Jhalokathi District, officially Jhalakathi District, (Bengali: ঝালকাঠি জেলা) is a district in southern Bangladesh. It is located in the Barisal Division and covers an area of 758.06 km^{2}. It is bounded by Barisal District to the north, Barguna district to the east and the Bishkhali river in the south, and Pirojpur district to the west. The main rivers in this district are the Bishkhali, Dhanshiri, Gabkhan, Sugandha, Jangalia, Bamanda and Bajitpur. "পেয়ারা আর শীতলপাটি, এই নিয়ে ঝালকাঠি" "(Jhalokathi, The land of tasty Guava and Shitolpati)" is the official motto of the district.

== History ==
Jhalokati subdivision was established in 1972, shortly after the Liberation of Bangladesh. It was turned into a district in 1984. The 2021 Bangladesh ferry fire occurred on the Sugandha River near the town.

== Subdivisions ==
Jhalokati District upazila geocode map

The district is administratively subdivided into 4 upazilas, these are:

1. Jhalokati Sadar Upazila
2. Kathalia Upazila
3. Nalchity Upazila
4. Rajapur Upazila

== Administration ==
District Council Chairman/Administrator: Khan Saifullah Panir

Deputy Commissioner (DC): Md. Johar Ali

== Transportation ==
- Roads & Highways: The district is connected to nearby districts such as Barisal and Pirojpur through regional roads. Local buses are readily available for these destinations. One can also go to Dhaka and other places in the country through the N8 Highway.
- Rural communications: Water transport is a major attraction in Jhalokati district. People can travel at a cheap cost by boats and various types of engine boats. Jhalokati is famous for its beautiful rivers and canals. Tourists can find it enjoyable to travel through boats.

== Demographics ==
=== Population ===
Historical population
Year	Pop.	±% p.a.
1974	496,791	—
1981	583,102	+2.31%
1991	666,139	+1.34%
2001	694,231	+0.41%
2011	682,669	−0.17%
2022	661,160	−0.29%

According to the 2022 Census of Bangladesh, Jhalokati District had 162,401 households and a population of 661,160 with an average 4.02 people per household. Among the population, 121,894 (18.44%) inhabitants were under 10 years of age. The population density was 935 people per km^{2}. Jhalokati District had a literacy rate (age 7 and over) of 83.21%, compared to the national average of 74.80%, and a sex ratio of 1088 females per 1000 males. Approximately, 27.85% of the population lived in urban areas. The ethnic population was 203.

=== Religion ===
Religions in Jhalokati district (2022)
Religion	Percent
Islam	90.69%
Hinduism	9.28%
Other or not stated	0.03%

Religion in present-day Jhalokati district
Religion	1941 (Note: Nalchiti, Jhalokati, Rajapur and Kathalia thanas of erstwhile Bakerganj district)		1981		1991		2001		2011		2022	
Religion	Pop.	%	Pop.	%	Pop.	%	Pop.	%	Pop.	%	Pop.	%
Islam	252,292	64.09%	494,499	84.81%	581,629	87.31%	620,585	89.39%	613,750	89.90%	599,593	90.69%
Hinduism	141,259	35.89%	88,258	15.14%	84,224	12.65%	73,327	10.56%	68,572	10.04%	61,352	9.28%
Others (Note: Including Jainism, Christianity, Buddhism, Zoroastrianism, Judaism, Ad-Dharmis, or not stated)	82	0.02%	345	0.05%	286	0.04%	319	0.05%	347	0.06%	215	0.03%
Total Population	393,633	100%	583,102	100%	666,139	100%	694,231	100%	682,669	100%	661,160	100%

A large majority of the district population is Muslim. It has 2475 mosques, 46 Hindu temples and five Buddhist pagodas. The percentage share of minority Hindus and Christians has seen a decline in absolute numbers since the 1981 census. After partition, many Hindus of the area migrated to West Bengal now in India.

=== Language ===
Most of the local residents speak a native dialect of Bengali, known by fellow countrymen as "Barishailla".

== Notable people ==
- Maqsudullah, Islamic scholar and first Pir of Talgachhia
- Nachiketa Chakraborty, famous Tollywood singer's family hails from Chechri Rampur village in Kathalia Upazila
- Osman Hadi, politician and convener of Inqilab Moncho
- Kabir Ahmed, former international footballer who played for the Pakistan national football team.
- Hazrat Mawlana Azizur Rahman Qaed Saheb huzur , Founder N S complex. Islamic scholar , Pir , Shufi and reformer of Bangladesh.
- Poet Jibana Nanda Dash .

== See also ==
- Districts of Bangladesh
- Barisal Division
