= Union councils of Bangladesh =

Smallest rural administrative unit in Bangladesh

A union council or union parishad, (Note: Bengali: ইউনিয়ন পরিষদ, romanized: iuniẏôn pôriṣôd, IPA: [ˈiu̯ni̯on ˈpoɾiʃɔd̪]) also known as a rural council, rural union, simply union, is the smallest rural administrative and local government unit in Bangladesh, with zila parishads (district councils) being the largest rural authorities and upazila parishads (sub-district council) being the intermediate level.

A union council, headed by a chairperson, consists of nine wards. These wards serve the purpose of electing members for general seats, with three additional seats reserved for women, all of which are directly elected.

Union councils are formed under the Local Government (Union Parishads) Act, 2009. The boundary of each union council is demarcated by the deputy commissioner of the district. Union councils are responsible for various development tasks, including agriculture, education, health, infrastructure, and sanitation. They also oversee administrative duties like birth registration, census activities, and maintaining civil status registers. Additionally, they contribute to maintaining law and order in their areas. As of 2022, there are 4,585 union parishads in Bangladesh. Dhamsana Union is the largest union and Sutalri Union is the smallest union in Bangladesh by population

== History ==
The term union dates back to the 1870 British legislation titled the Village Chowkidari Act which established union panchayats for collecting tax to maintain chowkidars (village police) in Bengal. Later the rural layer of the local government became known as union councils. After independence in 1971, the name of the union council was changed to union panchayat and an administrator was appointed to manage the affairs of the panchayat. In 1973, union panchayat's name reverted to union parishad. A more significant change was brought about in 1976 through the Local Government Ordinance which provided for a union parishad composed of one elected chairman and nine elected members, two nominated women members and two peasant representative members. A major change was initiated through the introduction of the Local Government (Union Parishad) Ordinance in 1983. Under this ordinance, every union council shall have one chairman, nine general members and three women members. The present law dealing with the union councils, i.e. Local Government (Union Parishads) Act, 2009, came into effect on 15 October 2009.

== Election ==
There are nine general members and three women members. The chairman and members are elected by direct election on the basis of adult franchise every five years. Three reserved women members, one for each three wards, are also elected by direct election. The chairman and member candidates must be Bangladeshi citizens having their names in the electoral roll of the respective union or ward. General elections of the union councils are conducted by the Bangladesh Election Commission. Majority members of a union council may bring a motion of no confidence against a member or chairman to the Upazila Nirbahi Officer.

== Powers and functions ==
Every union parishad is a body corporate, having perpetual succession and a common seal, with power to acquire and hold property. The functions with which the union parishads are entrusted by law include the following:

- Maintenance of law and order and assistance to administration for this purpose.
- Adoption and implementation of development schemes in the fields of local economy and society.
- Performing administrative and establishment functions.
- Providing public welfare services.

== Citizen charter ==
Every union council is required to publish a citizen charter describing all the services it provides. The charter includes description, timing, pricing, procedures and the conditions for the services. The remedies for non-compliance with the charter by the council or any individual is also mentioned in the charter itself.

== Funding ==
Every union parishad has a fund known as the union fund consisting of:

- Taxes, rates, fees and other charges levied by the union parishad under the Local Government (Union Parishads) Act 2009;
- Rents and profits payable or accruing to the union parishad from its own property;
- Money received by the union parishad in the performance of its functions;
- Money contributed by individuals or institutions or by any local authority;
- Receipts accruing from the trusts placed under the management of the union parishad;
- Grants made by the government and other authorities;
- Profits accruing from investments; and
- Proceeds from other sources directed by the government.

The chairman and members work full-time and receive a fixed honorarium from the government.

== See also ==
- Administrative geography of Bangladesh
- List of municipal corporations in Bangladesh
- Upazila
- District councils of Bangladesh
- List of unions in Barisal Division
