= Baniakandi Shahi Mosque =

Mosque in Kushita, Bangladesh

Baniakandi Three-Dome Shahi Mosque

Religion
- Affiliation: Islam

Location
- Location: Kumarkhali Upazila, Kushtia District, Bangladesh
- Interactive map of Baniakandi Three-Dome Shahi Mosque
- Coordinates: 23°52′22″N 89°16′11″E

Architecture
- Type: Mosque
- Style: Mughal architecture
- Completed: 1880s

Specifications
- Dome: 3 domes
- Minaret: 1

Baniakandi Three-Dome Shahi Mosque is a Mughal-period architectural monument and historic mosque located in Kushtia District of Bangladesh. The mosque was built in the 1880s in the village of Baniakandi in Kumarkhali Upazila. The mosque bears testimony to the early Muslim historical heritage of Kushtia District. Historian Khondkar Abdul Halim states that the mosque was possibly built during the reign of the Mughal emperor Aurangzeb. It is believed that the mosque was constructed around the same period as the Tebaria Three-Dome Jame Mosque.

== Location ==
The mosque is located in the village of Baniakandi in Kumarkhali Upazila of Kushtia District in the Khulna Division. Another famous mosque named Tebaria Three-Dome Jame Mosque is located nearby.

== Description ==
The mosque is known as the Three-Dome Jame Mosque because it has three domes. It is located in the traditional Khondkar Bari of Baniakandi village and has been managed by the Khondkar family for more than 240 years. However, other local Muslim residents of the village also offer prayers in this mosque.

== See also ==
- Jhaudia Shahi Mosque
- Islamic University Central Mosque
- Tebaria Three-Dome Jame Mosque
