= Tebaria Three-Dome Jame Mosque =

Mosque in Kushtia, Bangladesh

Religion
- Affiliation: Islam

Location
- Location: Tebaria, Kumarkhali Upazila, Kushtia District, Bangladesh
- Interactive map of Tebaria Three-Dome Jame Mosque
- Coordinates: 23.8506977°N 89.2471928°E

Architecture
- Type: Mosque
- Style: Mughal architecture
- Completed: 1880; 146 years ago

Specifications
- Dome: 3 domes
- Minaret: 1

Tebaria Three-Dome Jame Mosque is a historic mosque and an example of Mughal-period architecture located in Kushtia District of Bangladesh. The mosque was built in 1880 in the town of Kumarkhali Upazila in Kushtia District. The mosque bears testimony to the early Muslim historical heritage of Kushtia District. Historian Khondkar Abdul Halim states that the mosque was possibly built during the reign of the Mughal emperor Aurangzeb.

== Location ==
The mosque is located in the village of Tebaria near the town of Kumarkhali Upazila in Kushtia District of Khulna Division. A new Eidgah named Tebaria Eidgah has recently been constructed beside the mosque. Another well-known mosque named Baniakandi Shahi Jame Mosque is also located nearby.

== Description ==
Because the mosque has three domes, it is known as the Three-Dome Jame Mosque. At the time of construction, the founder Haji Alimuddin dedicated the land of the mosque as a waqf in the name of Islam. The descendants of the founder have been serving as the mutawalli (caretakers and administrators) of the mosque for more than 240 years. The current mutawalli of the mosque is Lipu Khondkar. Local residents of the village continue to trust and support their management.

== See also ==
- Jhaudia Shahi Mosque
- Islamic University Central Mosque
