= Hafiz Ibrahim (politician) =

Bangladeshi politician

Member of the Bangladesh Parliament for Bhola-2
- Incumbent
- Assumed office 17 February 2026
- Preceded by: Ali Azam
- In office 10 october 2001 – 29 october 2006
- Preceded by: Tofail Ahmed
- Succeeded by: Tofail Ahmed

Personal details
- Party: Bangladesh Nationalist Party
- Relatives: Giasuddin Al Mamun (brother)

Hafiz Ibrahim is a Bangladeshi politician. He served as a member of parliament from Bhola-2 constituency during 2001–2006. He was a BNP central committee member. He served as a director of state-owned Rupali Bank.

== Career ==
From 1994 to 2003, Ibrahim served as the director of Rupali Bank Limited. He was re-elected to board in 2003 despite Bangladesh Bank seeking an explanation why a director had served more than 6 years in a row at the bank against its rules. Rupali Bank was of the opinion as a state owned Bank that rule did not apply to them. Bangladesh Bank removed him in 2005. Syed Muhammad Yunus, a tubewell businessman, admitted to the Anti Corruption Commission that he embezzled 240 million taka from the bank with the help of Ibrahim.

In February 2007, the Anti-Corruption Commission (ACC) published a list of 50 persons of top corrupt suspects which included Ibrahim's name. After the deadline of 72 hours to submit the wealth statements, Ibrahim was arrested by the joint forces.

In October 2007, ACC investigation found Ibrahim and his younger brother, businessman Giasuddin Al Mamun guilty of illegally amassing Tk 171 crore in the preceding five years.

In May 2007, ACC filed the cases against the couple and a special court indicted the couple in November the same year. He was released on bail from Dhaka Central Jail in February 2009. In October 2011, following an appeal filed by Ibrahim, the High Court acquitted both of them of the corruption charges. But in August 2015, the Supreme Court scrapped those High Court acquittal verdicts.

In December 2008, nomination paper for the election from Bhola-2 constituency of Ibrahim was rejected as he was a convict in criminal cases and accused of total 18 cases.

In August 2011, ACC filed a case against Ibrahim and his wife for laundering $1.75 lakh to Singapore. A Dhaka court in December 2012 granted bail to them. In October 2012, the Supreme Court stayed the money laundering case.

In July 2013, a Barisal court framed charges against Ibrahim in a case filed over misappropriating relief items of corrugated tin.

later in 13th Parliamentary election he has elected MP from Bhola-2 for the second time from Bangladesh nationalist party
