= Bapta =

- Location in Bangladesh
- Coordinates: 22°42′N 90°39′E
- Country: Bangladesh
- Division: Barisal Division
- District: Bhola District
- Time zone: UTC+6 (Bangladesh Time)

Bapta is a village in Bhola Sadar Upazila of Bhola District in the Barisal Division of southern-central Bangladesh. About four-fifths of the village is in Bapta Union, with the remainder being part of Bhola Municipality.
