= Bhola Sadar Upazila =

Bhola Sadar ভোলা সদর
- Upazila
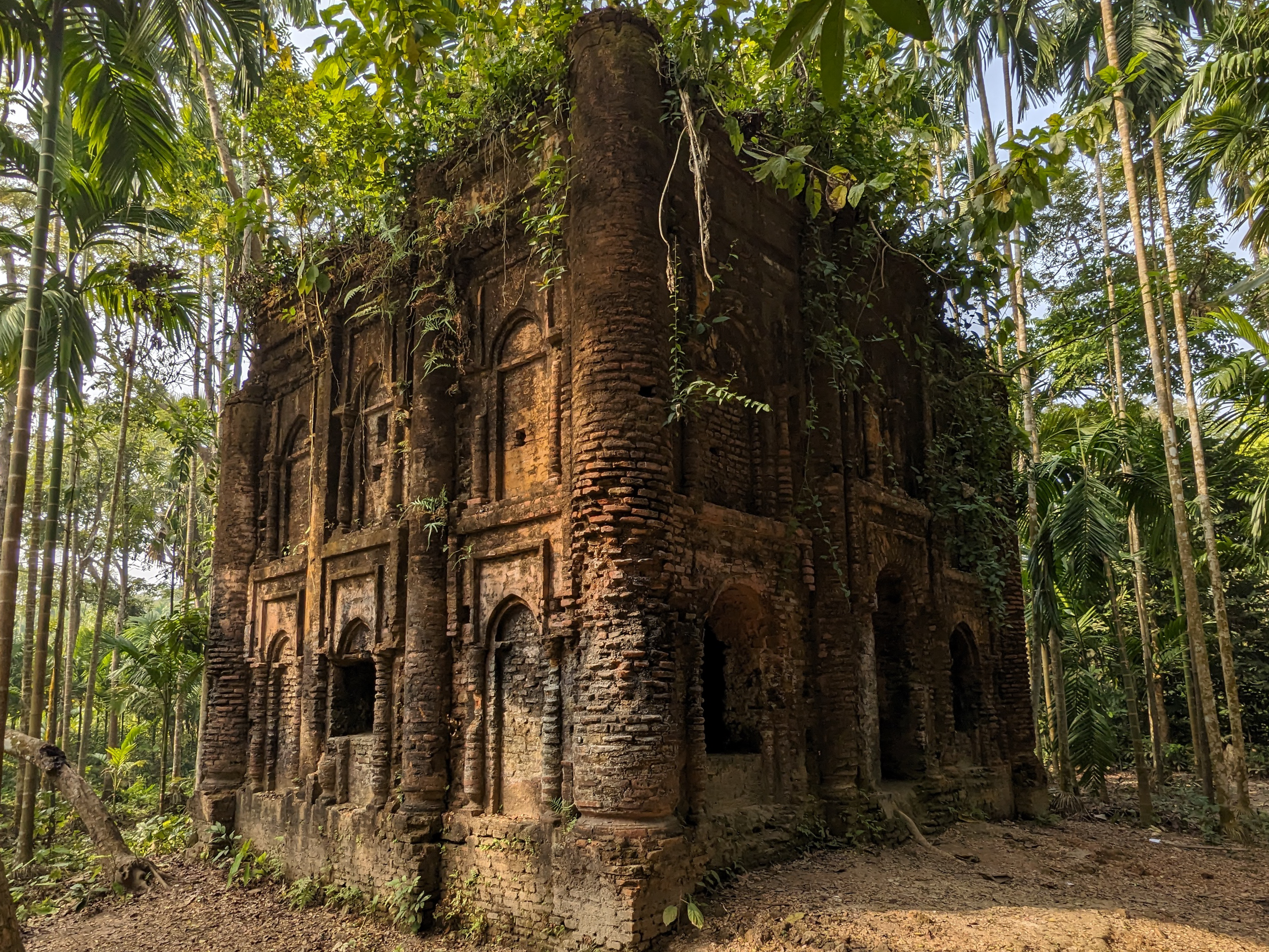
- Mughal-era mosque in South Dighaldi, Bhola Sadar

- Coordinates: 22.686°N 90.638°E
- Country: Bangladesh
- Division: Barisal
- District: Bhola
- Headquarters: Bhola

Area
  - Total: 413.16 km^{2} (159.52 sq mi)
- Elevation: 7 m (23 ft)

Population (2022)
  - Total: 444,838
  - Density: 1,076.7/km^{2} (2,788.6/sq mi)
  - Male: 217,776
  - Female: 227,052
- Time zone: UTC+6 (BST)
- Postal code: 8300
- Area code: 0491
- Website: Official Map of the Bhola Sadar Upazila

Bhola Sadar (Bengali: ভোলা সদর) is an upazila of Bhola District in Barisal Division, Bangladesh. It contains its district headquarters, Bhola.

== Geography ==
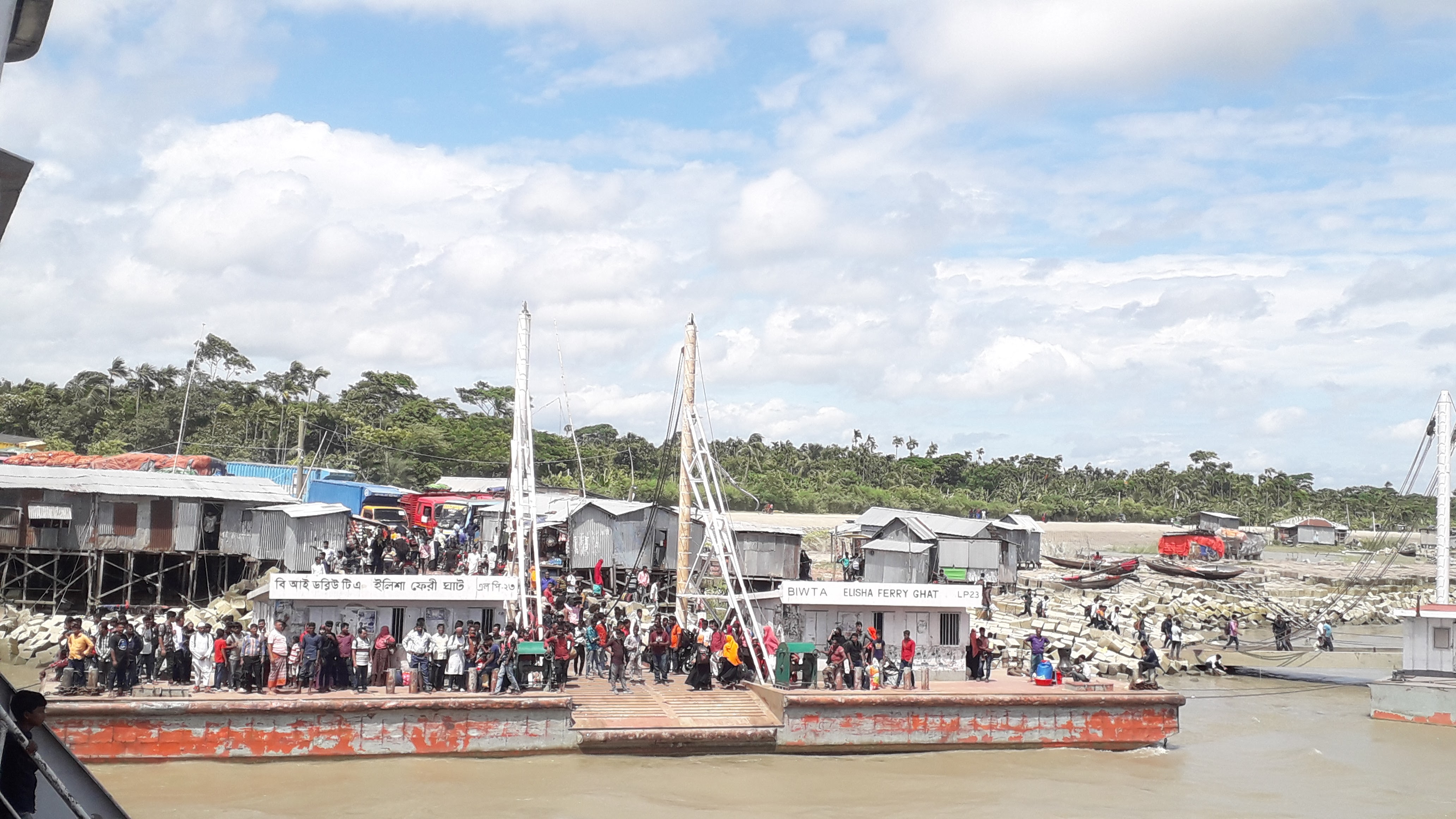
Ilish Ferry, Bhola Sadar

Bhola Sadar is located at 22.6903°N 90.6525°E. It has a total area of 413.16 km^{2} (159.52 sq mi). It is bounded by Mehendiganj, Hizla and Lakshmipur Sadar upazilas on the north, Bauphal and Burhanuddin upazilas on the south, Daulatkhan upazila on the east, Barisal sadar, Mehendiganj and Bakerganj upazilas on the west.

== Demographics ==
Historical population
Year	Pop. (000)	±%
1981	284	—
1991	352	+23.9%
2001	408	+15.9%
2011	431	+5.6%
2022	445	+3.2%
Source: Bangladesh Bureau of Statistics

Religions in Bhola Sadar Upazila (2022)
Religion	Percent
Islam	96.90%
Hinduism	3.08%
Other or not stated	0.02%

Bhola Sadar Upazila mauza geocode map

According to the 2022 Bangladeshi census, Bhola Sadar Upazila had 102,157 households and a population of 444,838. 11.26% of the population were under 5 years of age. Bhola Sadar had a literacy rate (age 7 and over) of 70.41%: 69.99% for males and 70.81% for females, and a sex ratio of 95.91 males for every 100 females. 154,510 (34.73%) lived in urban areas.

According to the 2011 Census of Bangladesh, Bhola Sadar Upazila had 88,068 households and a population of 430,520. 115,195 (26.76%) were under 10 years of age. Bhola Sadar had a literacy rate (age 7 and over) of 45.22%, compared to the national average of 51.8%, and a sex ratio of 1010 females per 1000 males. 87,243 (20.26%) lived in urban areas.

== Administration ==
Bhola Thana was formed in 1842 and it was turned into an upazila on 1 February, 1984.

Bhola Sadar Upazila is divided into Bhola Municipality and 13 union parishads: Alinagor, Bapta, Charshamya, Dakshin Digholdi, Dhania, Ilisha, Kachia, Paschim Ilisa, Razapur, Shibpur, Uttar Digholdi, Vheduria, and Vhelumia. The union parishads are subdivided into 92 mauzas and 108 villages.

Bhola Municipality is subdivided into 9 wards and 19 mahallas.

== Notable residents ==
- Mohammad Mozammel Haq (1883–1976), poet and politician
- Tofail Ahmed, Member of Parliament (MP) for constituency Bakerganj-1 from 1973 to 1975, for Bhola-2 from 1986 to 1988, for Bhola-1 from 1991 to 1996, and for Bhola-2 again from 1996 to 2001 and 2009 until 2014, MP for constituency Bhola-1 again
- Andaleeve Rahman Partho, Member of Parliament for constituency Bhola-1 from 2009 to 2014.
- Sayed Kamaluddin Zafree, Islamic scholar
- Nasir Ahmed, Bengali poet and journalist

== See also ==
- Upazilas of Bangladesh
- Districts of Bangladesh
- Divisions of Bangladesh
- Administrative geography of Bangladesh
