= Nizam Uddin Ahmed =

Nizam Uddian Ahmed may refer to:

- Nizam Uddin Ahmed (Awami League politician) (died 1990), Bangladeshi politician
- Nizam Uddin Ahmed (Bangladesh Nationalist Party politician), Bangladeshi politician
