= Bhola-2 =

Constituency of Bangladesh's Jatiya Sangsad

Coordinates: 22.50°N 90.72°E

- Constituency for the Jatiya Sangsad
- District: Bhola District
- Division: Barisal Division
- Electorate: 395,546 (2026)

Current constituency
- Created: 1984
- Party: Bangladesh Nationalist Party
- Member: Hafiz Ibrahim
- ← 115 Bhola-1 117 Bhola-3 →

Bhola-2 is a constituency represented in the Jatiya Sangsad (National Parliament) of Bangladesh since 2026 by Hafiz Ibrahim of the Bangladesh Nationalist Party.

== Boundaries ==
The constituency encompasses Burhanuddin and Daulatkhan upazilas.

== History ==
The constituency was created in 1984 from a Bakerganj constituency when the former Bakerganj District was split into four districts: Bhola, Bakerganj, Jhalokati, and Pirojpur.

== Members of Parliament ==
Election	Member	Party
1986	Tofail Ahmed	Awami League
1988	Siddiqur Rahman	Jatiya Party
Sep 1991 by-election	Mosharraf Hossain Shahjahan	Bangladesh Nationalist Party
Feb 1996	Nizam Uddin Ahmed	Bangladesh Nationalist Party
Jun 1996	Tofail Ahmed	Awami League
2001	Hafiz Ibrahim	Bangladesh Nationalist Party
2008	Tofail Ahmed	Awami League
2014	Ali Azam	Awami League
2018	Ali Azam	Awami League
2024	Ali Azam	Awami League
2026	Hafiz Ibrahim	Bangladesh Nationalist Party

== Elections ==
=== Elections in the 2020s ===
General Election 2026: Bhola-2
Party	Candidate	Votes	%	±%
BNP	Hafiz Ibrahim	119,085		N/A
Jamaat	Mohammad Fazlul Karim	93,703		N/A
Majority		25,382		N/A
Turnout				N/A
BNP gain from AL				

=== Elections in the 2010s ===
General Election 2014: Bhola-2
Party	Candidate	Votes	%	±%
AL	Ali Azam	156,697	94.8	+38.6
Jatiya Party (M)	Md. Salah Uddin	8,561	5.2	N/A
Majority		148,136	89.6	+76.2
Turnout		165,258	65.2	−18.1
AL hold				

=== Elections in the 2000s ===
General Election 2008: Bhola-2
Party	Candidate	Votes	%	±%
AL	Tofail Ahmed	103,282	56.2	+17.0
BJP	Dr. Ashikur Rahman	78,730	42.9	−16.8
BKA	Abu Jafor Kasemi	679	0.4	N/A
IAB	Md. Yousuf	645	0.4	N/A
Gano Front	Krisok Md. Sadak	319	0.2	N/A
Majority		24,552	13.4	−7.1
Turnout		183,655	83.3	+32.3
AL gain from BNP				

General Election 2001: Bhola-2
Party	Candidate	Votes	%	±%
BNP	Hafiz Ibrahim	82,927	59.7	+17.6
AL	Tofail Ahmed	54,437	39.2	−11.5
IJOF	Md. Jahangir Alam Shikder	513	0.4	N/A
Independent	Md. Morshed Alam	301	0.2	N/A
Independent	Md. Mostafizur Rahman	263	0.2	N/A
Independent	Shah Md. Mosleh Uddin	212	0.2	N/A
Independent	Mir Md. Shahabuddin	203	0.2	N/A
Majority		28,490	20.5	+11.9
Turnout		138,856	51.0	−11.2
BNP hold				

=== Elections in the 1990s ===
General Election June 1996: Bhola-2
Party	Candidate	Votes	%	±%
AL	Tofail Ahmed	48,924	50.7	
BNP	Hafiz Ibrahim	40,643	42.1	
Jamaat	Mohammad Faziul Karim	4,562	4.7	
JP(E)	Mohammad Kaikobad Mian	583	0.6	
IOJ	Md. Abdul Karim	551	0.6	
Islamic Sashantantrik Andolan	Kari Golam Mostofa	495	0.5	
Democratic Republican Party	Md. Salam Uddin	362	0.4	
FP	Mohammad Salah Uddin Talukdar	208	0.2	
Independent	Mir Mohammad Gias Uddin	149	0.2	
Majority		8,281	8.6	
Turnout		96,477	62.2	
AL gain from BNP				

Tofael Ahmed stood for two seats in the 1991 general election: Bhola-1 and Bhola-2. After winning both, he chose to represent the former and quit the latter, triggering a by-election. Mosharraf Hossain Shahjahan of the BNP was elected in a September 1991 by-election.

General Election 1991: Bhola-2
Party	Candidate	Votes	%	±%
AL	Tofail Ahmed	38,626	48.4	
JP(E)	Naziur Rahman Manzur	23,445	29.4	
BNP	Md. Shahidul Haq Chowdhury	8,670	10.9	
Jamaat	Syed Jamal Uddin Zafri	6,546	8.2	
Independent	Md. Siddiq Miah	1,427	1.8	
Jatiya Samajtantrik Dal-JSD	Sk. Farid	366	0.5	
FP	Yusuf Manager	236	0.3	
Zaker Party	Mahbub Miah	208	0.3	
Independent	Selim	176	0.2	
Independent	Mohabbat Jan Chowdhury	107	0.1	
Majority		15,181	19.0	
Turnout		79,807	30.2	
AL gain from				
