= Tofail Ahmed (politician) =

Bangladeshi politician and revolutionary (1943–2026)

- তোফায়েল আহমেদ
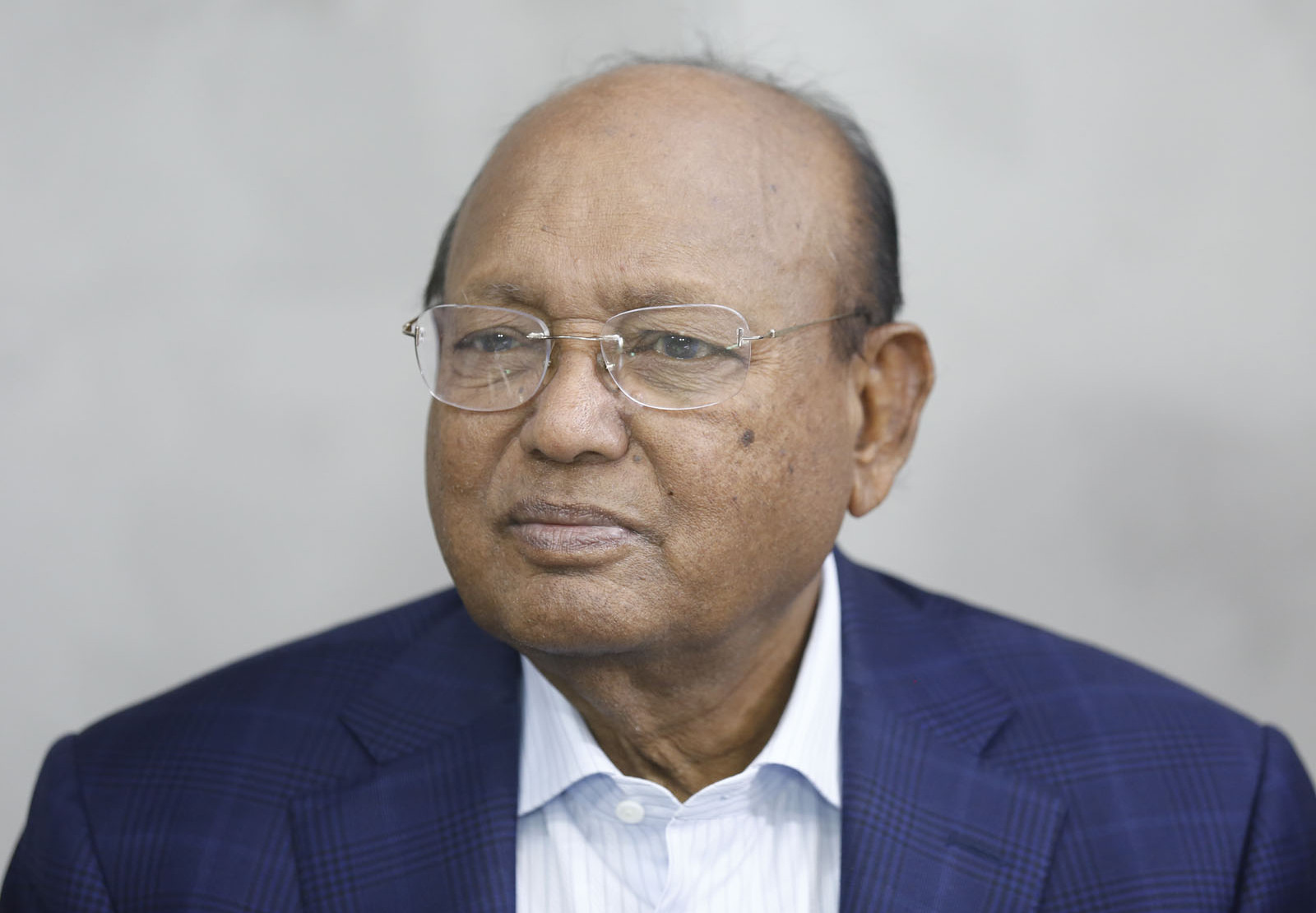
- Ahmed in 2019

Minister of Commerce
- In office 12 January 2014 – 6 January 2019
- Prime Minister: Sheikh Hasina
- Preceded by: GM Quader
- Succeeded by: Tipu Munshi

Minister of Industries
- In office 14 July 1996 – 13 July 2001
- Prime Minister: Sheikh Hasina
- Preceded by: Shamsul Islam Khan
- Succeeded by: Rezaul Karim Mannan

Member of Parliament
- In office 12 January 2014 – 6 August 2024
- Preceded by: Andaleeve Rahman
- Succeeded by: Andaleeve Rahman
- Constituency: Bhola-1
- In office 5 March 1991 – February 1996
- Preceded by: Naziur Rahman Manzur
- Succeeded by: Mosharraf Hossain Shahjahan
- Constituency: Bhola-1
- In office 25 January 2008 – 20 November 2014
- Preceded by: Hafiz Ibrahim
- Succeeded by: Ali Azam
- Constituency: Bhola-2
- In office 14 July 1996 – 13 July 2001
- Preceded by: Mosharraf Hossain Shahjahan
- Succeeded by: Hafiz Ibrahim
- Constituency: Bhola-2
- In office 10 July 1986 – 6 December 1988
- Succeeded by: Mohammad Siddiqur Rahman
- Constituency: Bhola-2
- In office 7 April 1973 – 6 Nov 1975
- Succeeded by: AKM Akhtaruzzaman Alamgir
- Constituency: Bakerganj-1 (now defunct)

Personal details
- Born: 22 October 1943 Koralia, Bhola Island, Backergunge District, Bengal Province, British India (Note: Under present-day Bhola Sadar Upazila, Bhola District, Barishal Division, Bangladesh)
- Died: 1 June 2026 (aged 82) Dhaka, Bangladesh
- Party: Bangladesh Awami League (1970 – 2026)
- Other political affiliations: Bangladesh Krishak Sramik Awami League (1975) All-Party Student Action Committee (1967 – 1969) East Pakistan Students' League (1957 – 1970)
- Parent(s): Moulvi Azhar Ali (father); Fatema Khatun (mother)

Military service
- Allegiance: Bangladesh
- Branch/service: Mujib Bahini
- Years of service: 1970–1972
- Rank: Commander (South-western region)

Tofail Ahmed (22 October 1943 – 1 June 2026) was a Bangladeshi independence activist, Bengali nationalist–Mujibist revolutionary and politician. He played a key role in the 1969 East Pakistan mass uprising and then the Bangladesh Liberation War in 1971. In independent Bangladesh, he was a close confident of Sheikh Mujibur Rahman, and then served as full minister for the ministries of Industries and Commerce under Sheikh Hasina. He was a 8-term Jatiya Sangsad member representing the Bhola-1, Bhola-2 and Bakerganj-1 constituencies during 1973–2024.

== Early life and education ==
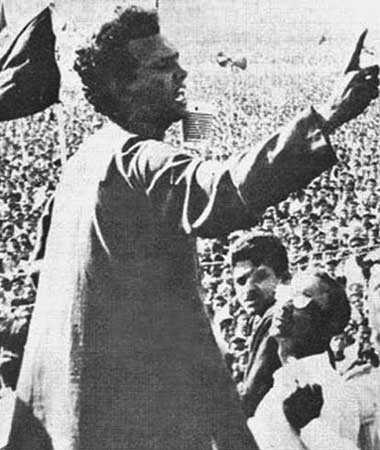
Ahmed making a speech in the 1969 Mass Uprising in Dhaka

Tofail was born on 22nd October 1943 in the village of Koralia in Bhola Island, then a part of the Backergunge District of the Bengal Presidency, to Bengali Muslim parents Moulvi Azhar Ali and Fatema Khatun, who lived in poverty.

He studied at the Bhola Government High School until 1960 and then at the Brojomohun College until 1962. He graduated from the University of Dacca with a Master of Science in Soil science.

== Career ==
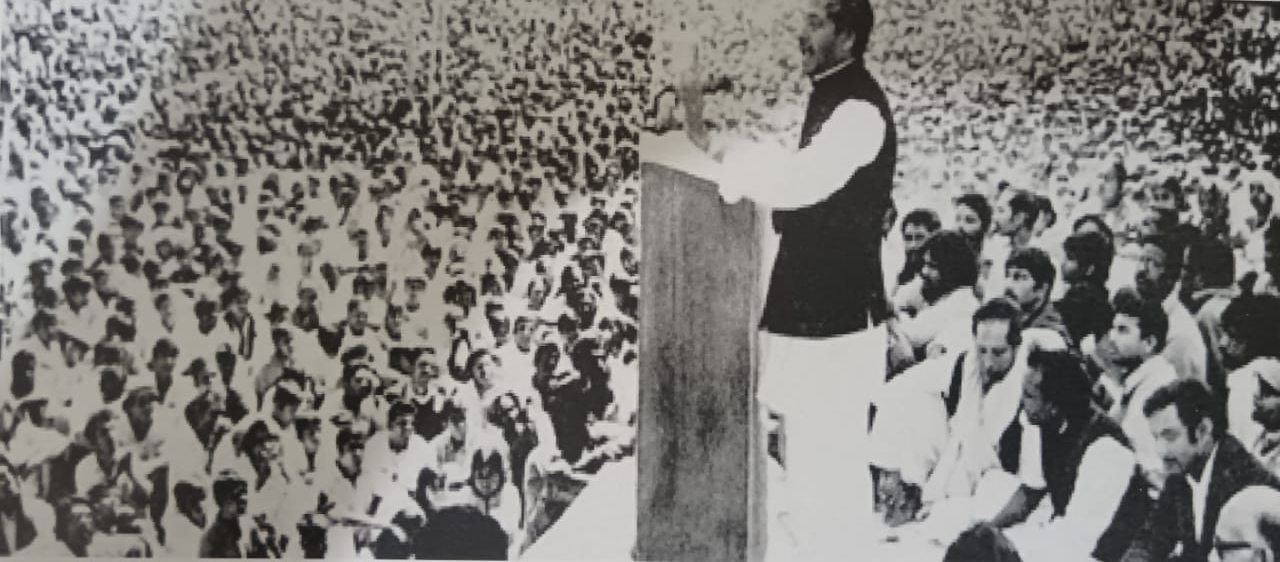
Mujib addressing at the procession of 1969 mass upsurge, where he was recognized as Bangabandhu by Tofail Ahmed

Tofail joined the Awami League in support of the 1966 Six point movement of then party leader Sheikh Mujibur Rahman and was involved in the 1969 mass uprising in East Pakistan as a student leader. He served as the vice-president of Dhaka University Central Students' Union from 1968-1969. In 1970, Ahmed was a political secretary of Sheikh Mujibur Rahman. He was a Bangladeshi independence activist and one of the organisers of Mujib Bahini during the Bangladesh Liberation War in 1971. He was appointed political secretary to Prime Minister Sheikh Mujibur Rahman with the rank of a Minister in 1972 after the war.

After the 15 August 1975 Bangladeshi coup d'état and the assassination of Sheikh Mujibur Rahman, Tofail was detained by the ruling military administration. His Assistant Personal Secretary, Mintu, was tortured to death in custody.

In 1996, prior to the controversial February elections, Tofail was arrested along with Bangladesh Jamaat-e-Islami leader Abdul Quader Mollah under the Special Powers Act. He served as the Minister of Commerce in the Awami League government from July 1996 to January 2001. After winning the controversial 2008 general election, the Awami League formed the government but Tofail was dropped from the cabinet despite being an influential member of the Awami League Presidium.

Tofail was chairman of the Parliamentary Standing Committee on Industries Ministry. He was also a member of the advisory committee of the Awami League. He was elected several times as a member of the Jatiya Sangsad from constituencies in Bhola. He served as the Minister of Commerce again from January 2014 to January 2019. He has faced numerous allegations of corruption while serving as Minister of Commerce from 2014-2019.

Following the fall of the Sheikh Hasina led Awami League government, Tofail's home in Bhola was burned down and vandalised in February 2025. Dhaka Divisional Special Judge Shamima Afroz issued an arrest warrant against him in a 24 year old case in May 2026. His lawyers had requested bail on health grounds but the judge had turned it down.

== Personal life and death ==
Ahmed married Anwara Begum (1950–2025), daughter of Mafizul Haq Taluqdar of Dania, in 1964. They had one daughter, Taslima Ahmed Zaman Munni, who is a doctor. Their son-in-law is Tauhiduzzaman Tuhin, a cardiologist at Square Hospital.

Ahmed died at Square Hospital in Dhaka on 1 June 2026. He was 82.

He was buried with full state honors. His funeral was attended by the general public including leaders of the Bangladesh Nationalist Party and Bangladesh Awami League. However, members of his banned political party, the Awami League, attempted to hold processions and marches using party slogans after his funeral but were stopped and detained by police.

The Jatiya Sangsad expressed condolences on his death.
