= Bhola-1 =

Constituency of Bangladesh's Jatiya Sangsad

Coordinates: 22.69°N 90.65°E

- Constituency for the Jatiya Sangsad
- District: Bhola District
- Division: Barisal Division
- Electorate: 406,567 (2026)

Current constituency
- Created: 1984
- Party: Bangladesh Jatiya Party
- Member: Andaleeve Rahman Partho
- ← 114 Patuakhali-4 116 Bhola-2 →

Bhola-1 is a constituency represented in the Jatiya Sangsad (National Parliament) of Bangladesh since 2026 by Andaleeve Rahman Partho of the Bangladesh Jatiya Party.

== Boundaries ==
The constituency encompasses Bhola Sadar Upazila.

== History ==
The constituency was created in 1984 from the Bakerganj-1 constituency when the former Bakerganj District was split into four districts: Bhola, Bakerganj, Jhalokati, and Pirojpur.

== Members of Parliament ==
Election	Member	Party
1986	Naziur Rahman Manzur	Jatiya Party
1991	Tofail Ahmed	Awami League
Feb 1996	Mosharef Hossain Shahjahan	Bangladesh Nationalist Party
Jun 1996	Vacant	
2001	Mosharef Hossain Shahjahan	Bangladesh Nationalist Party
2008	Andaleeve Rahman Partho	Bangladesh Jatiya Party
2014	Tofail Ahmed	Awami League
2018	Tofail Ahmed	Awami League
2024	Tofail Ahmed	Awami League
2026	Andaleeve Rahman Partho	Bangladesh Jatiya Party

== Elections ==
=== Elections in the 2020s ===
General Election 2026: Bhola-1
Party	Candidate	Votes	%	±%
BJP	Andaleeve Rahman	105,543	49.51	N/A
Jamaat	Md. Nazrul Islam	75,337	35.33	N/A
IAB	Obaidur Rahman	25,245	11.84	N/A
Majority		30,206	14.18	N/A
Turnout		213,201	52.43	N/A
Registered electors		406,567		
BJP gain from AL				

=== Elections in the 2010s ===
General Election 2018: Bhola-1
Party	Candidate	Votes	%	±%
AL	Tofael Ahmed	245,409	94.20	+50.3
IAB	Mawlana Mohammad Yasin	7,801	2.99	N/A
BNP	Golam Nabi Alamgir	7,299	2.80	N/A
Majority		237,608	91.21	+81.9
Turnout		260,509	84.03	+6.6
Registered electors		310,048		
AL hold				

Tofail Ahmed was elected unopposed in the 2014 general election after opposition parties withdrew their candidacies in a boycott of the election.

=== Elections in the 2000s ===
General Election 2008: Bhola-1
Party	Candidate	Votes	%	±%
BJP	Andaleeve Rahman	95,158	53.2	−8.9
AL	Yusuf Hossain Humayun	78,489	43.9	+6.4
IAB	Md. Anisul Haque	3,698	2.1	N/A
BDB	Abu Azam Khan	724	0.4	N/A
Gano Front	Krisok Md. Sadak	484	0.3	N/A
Independent	Tapon Kumar Chakraborty	204	0.1	N/A
Majority		16,669	9.3	−15.2
Turnout		178,757	77.4	+16.2
BJP gain from BNP				

General Election 2001: Bhola-1
Party	Candidate	Votes	%	±%
BNP	Mosharraf Hossain Shahjahan	95,904	62.1	+19.4
AL	Tofail Ahmed	58,010	37.5	−7.3
JSD	Md. Nasir Uddin	313	0.2	N/A
BKSMA	Krisok Md. Sadaq	173	0.1	N/A
Independent	Md. Humayun Kabir	136	0.1	N/A
Majority		37,894	24.5	+22.4
Turnout		154,536	61.2	−5.0
BNP gain from AL				

=== Elections in the 1990s ===
Tofail Ahmed stood for two seats in the June 1996 general election: Bhola-1 and Bhola-2. After winning both, he chose to represent the latter and quit the former, triggering a by-election. The High Court, however, stayed the by-election, and the seat remained vacant for the entire tenure of the seventh parliament.

General Election June 1996: Bhola-1
Party	Candidate	Votes	%	±%
AL	Tofail Ahmed	50,099	44.8	+7.6
BNP	Mosharraf Hossain Shahjahan	47,759	42.7	+17.3
Jamaat	Abu Bakar Siddique	6,071	5.4	+1.9
JP(E)	Maksudur Rahman	4,024	3.6	−28.7
IOJ	Abdul Mannan	2,816	2.5	N/A
Zaker Party	Md. Sahid Alam	604	0.5	+0.2
Gano Forum	Abu Taher	193	0.2	N/A
BKSMA	Krisok Md. Sadak	169	0.1	N/A
FP	A. Hadi Masud	58	0.1	N/A
Majority		2,340	2.1	−2.8
Turnout		111,793	66.2	+18.5
AL hold				

General Election 1991: Bhola-1
Party	Candidate	Votes	%	±%
AL	Tofail Ahmed	36,465	37.2	
JP(E)	Naziur Rahman Manzur	31,644	32.3	
BNP	Mosharraf Hossain Shahjahan	24,922	25.4	
Jamaat	A. F. M. Abdul Hamid	3,382	3.5	
Zaker Party	Abdul Ohab Miah	322	0.3	
Independent	Md. Ali Zinnah	277	0.3	
Independent	Mahmudul Haq Kamal	216	0.3	
BKSMA	Krisok Md. Sadak	213	0.2	
JSD	Md. Shahajahan	179	0.2	
Independent	Abdul Jabbar Hauladar	141	0.1	
Independent	Monsur Helal	132	0.1	
NAP(M)	Md. Shahajahan	100	0.1	
Majority		4,821	4.9	
Turnout		98,003	47.7	
AL gain from JP(E)				
