= Islamic University Central Mosque =

Mosque in Kushtia, Bangladesh

- ইসলামী বিশ্ববিদ্যালয় কেন্দ্রীয় মসজিদ
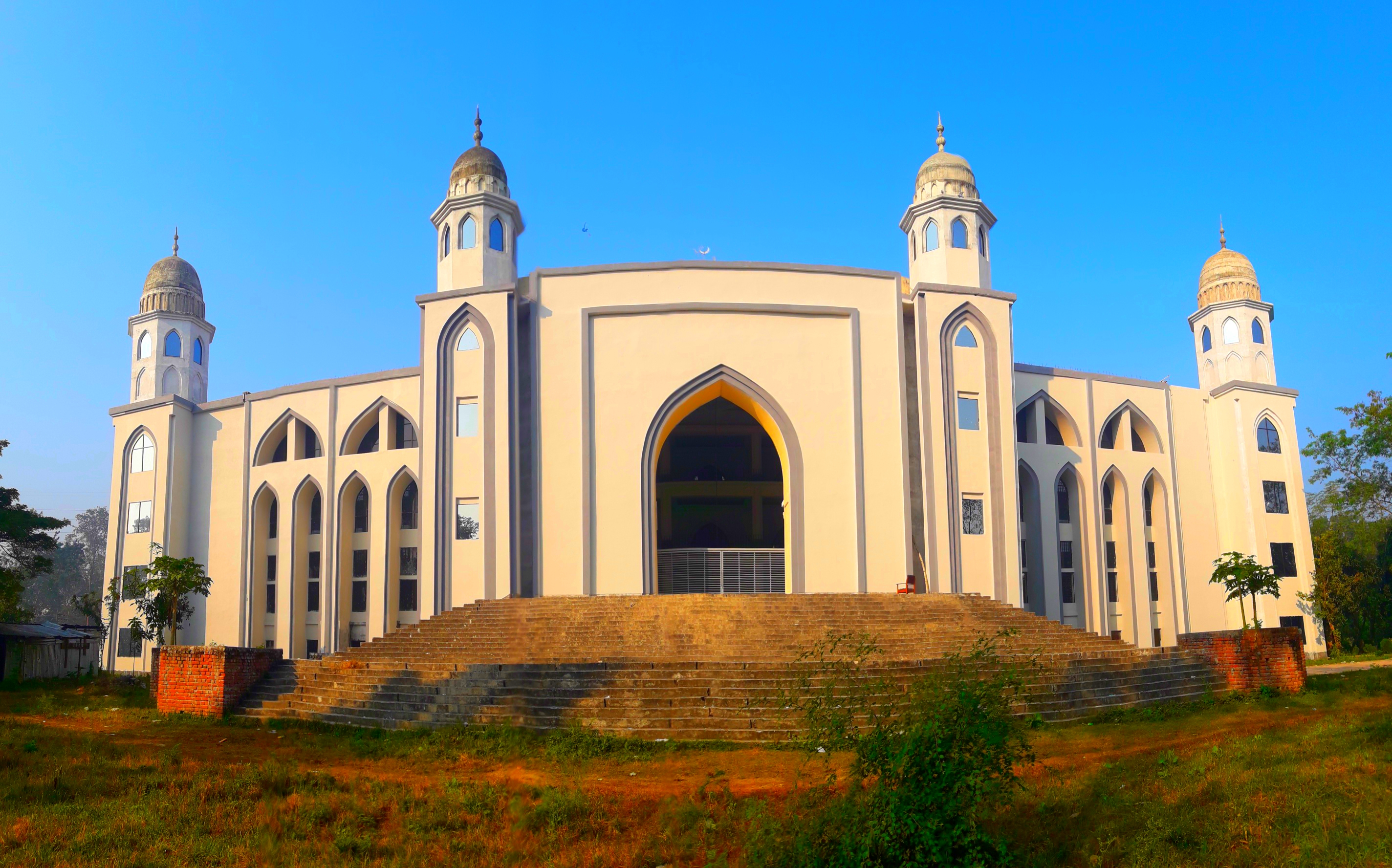

Religion
- Affiliation: Islam
- District: Kushtia District

Location
- Location: IU campus
- Country: Bangladesh
- Interactive map of Islamic University Central Mosque
- Coordinates: 23°43′22″N 89°08′57″E

Architecture
- Funded by: Government of Bangladesh; Government of Saudi Arabia
- Established: 1994; 32 years ago
- Completed: 2017; 9 years ago

Specifications
- Capacity: 17,000
- Dome: 14
- Dome height (outer): 150 ft
- Site area: 5.56 acres (22,500 m^{2})

Islamic University Central Mosque is a mosques in Kushtia District, Bangladesh. It was constructed inside the campus of Islamic University to accommodate students for prayers. It is the third largest mosque in Bangladesh and the largest mosque associated with any educational institution. It can accommodate 17,000 worshippers at the same time. Currently, Ashraf Uddin Khan serves as the khatib and imam of the mosque. Including the central mosque, there are nine mosques in total on the Islamic University campus.

== History ==
Construction of the mosque began around 1994. Initially, the government funded the construction, but due to the mosque’s large scale, foreign donations were later received. These foreign funds became the main driving force for construction. Later, the university administration allegedly misused the allocated funds, and accusations of mismanagement and corruption arose. As a result, foreign donors stopped funding and some funds were recalled, causing delays in construction.

In 2004, after about 36% of construction was completed using government funds, the then Minister of Religious Affairs Mosharraf Hossain Shahjahan inaugurated the mosque and opened it for prayers. No further construction took place for the next 13 years. Later, in 2017, during Vice-Chancellor Rashid Askari’s tenure, some work was completed in two phases at a cost of 55 million BDT.

In September 2021, students raised complaints regarding the sound system, after which a modern sound system was installed with funding from BRAC Net. On 13 June 2022, four fans were stolen after glass windows were broken. Students criticized the security, prompting formation of an investigation committee and enhanced security measures. On 21 April 2023, the US Embassy in Dhaka posted a photo of the mosque on Facebook, praising its exterior design.

== Architecture and structure ==
The mosque is built over 2.25 hectares on campus. It is a four-story square building constructed with ceramic and white marble. Sunlight creates a bright glow on the mosque exterior during the day. The ground floor covers 51,000 sq. ft. The main part of the four-story mosque can accommodate 7,000 worshippers. An additional 10,000 can pray on the front pavement. A 90 ft high dome stands at the front. Currently, the mosque has 14 domes of various sizes.

Four minarets, each 150 ft high, are located around the mosque. There are entrances on three sides, each with a dome above it. Wide pathways connect the mosque to all faculty buildings. A library and research center are proposed in the basement. It is estimated that another 5 crore BDT is needed to complete all construction. The total area of the first, second, and third floors is 7,100 sq. m; the second floor accommodates 3,300 people, the third floor 800, and the fourth floor 2,500, totaling over 6,500 worshippers simultaneously.

== Khatib ==
The mosque has one imam, responsible for the five daily prayers and the Friday Jumu'ah prayer.

- A. S. M. Shoaib Ahmad (1997–2023), died in a road accident.
- Ashraf Uddin Khan (2023–present)

== Facilities ==
In addition to prayers, the central mosque hosts several facilities: an Islamic library and research center, Islamic bank, a cafeteria for staff, and the university press. Female students have a prayer area on the second floor. Although each dormitory has its own mosque, the central mosque is mainly used for Jumu'ah prayers. Annual Eid prayers for local residents and campus members are also held here.

== Gallery ==
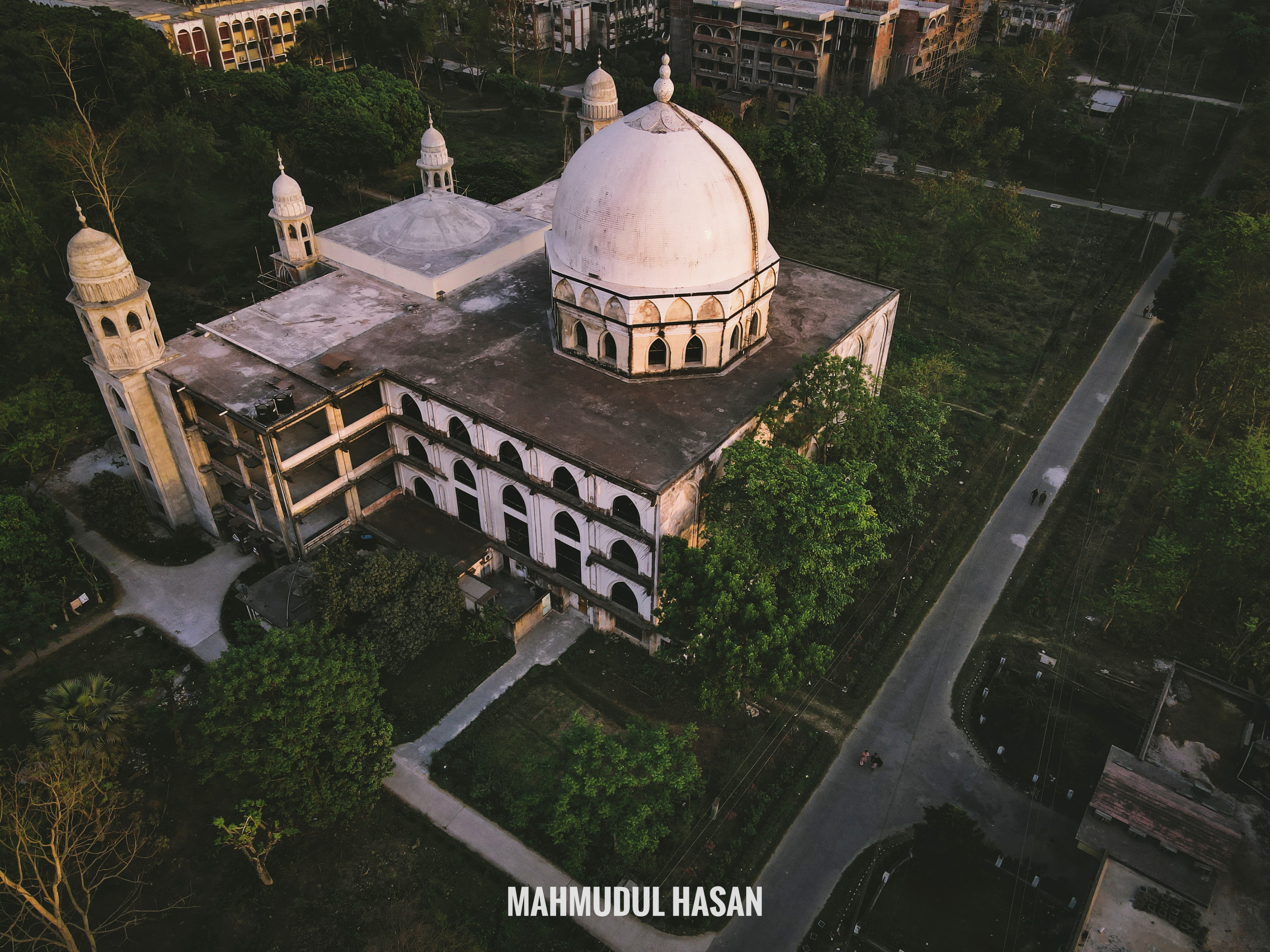
Drone view of IU Mosque

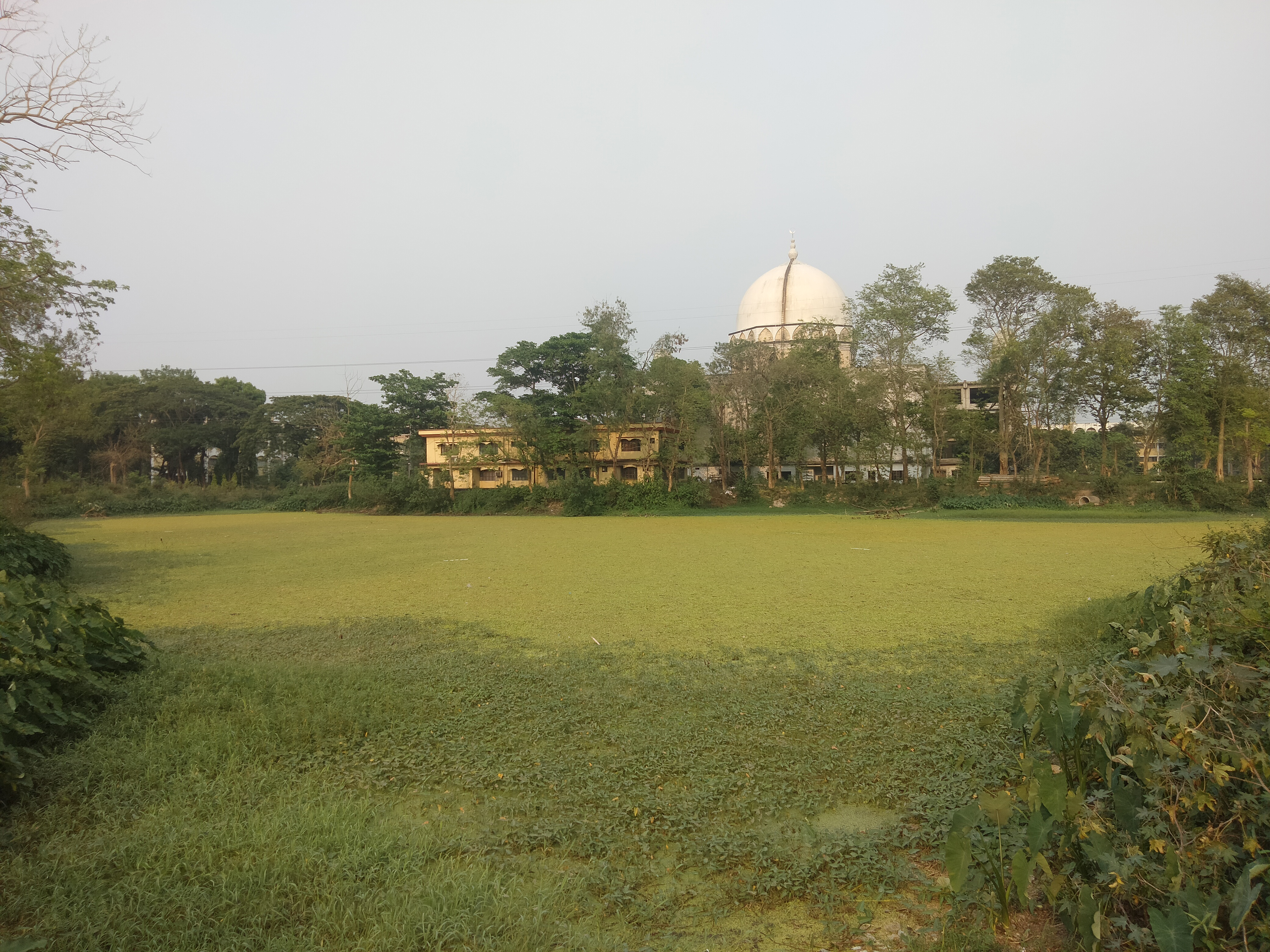
View of mosque minaret from Mofiz Lake

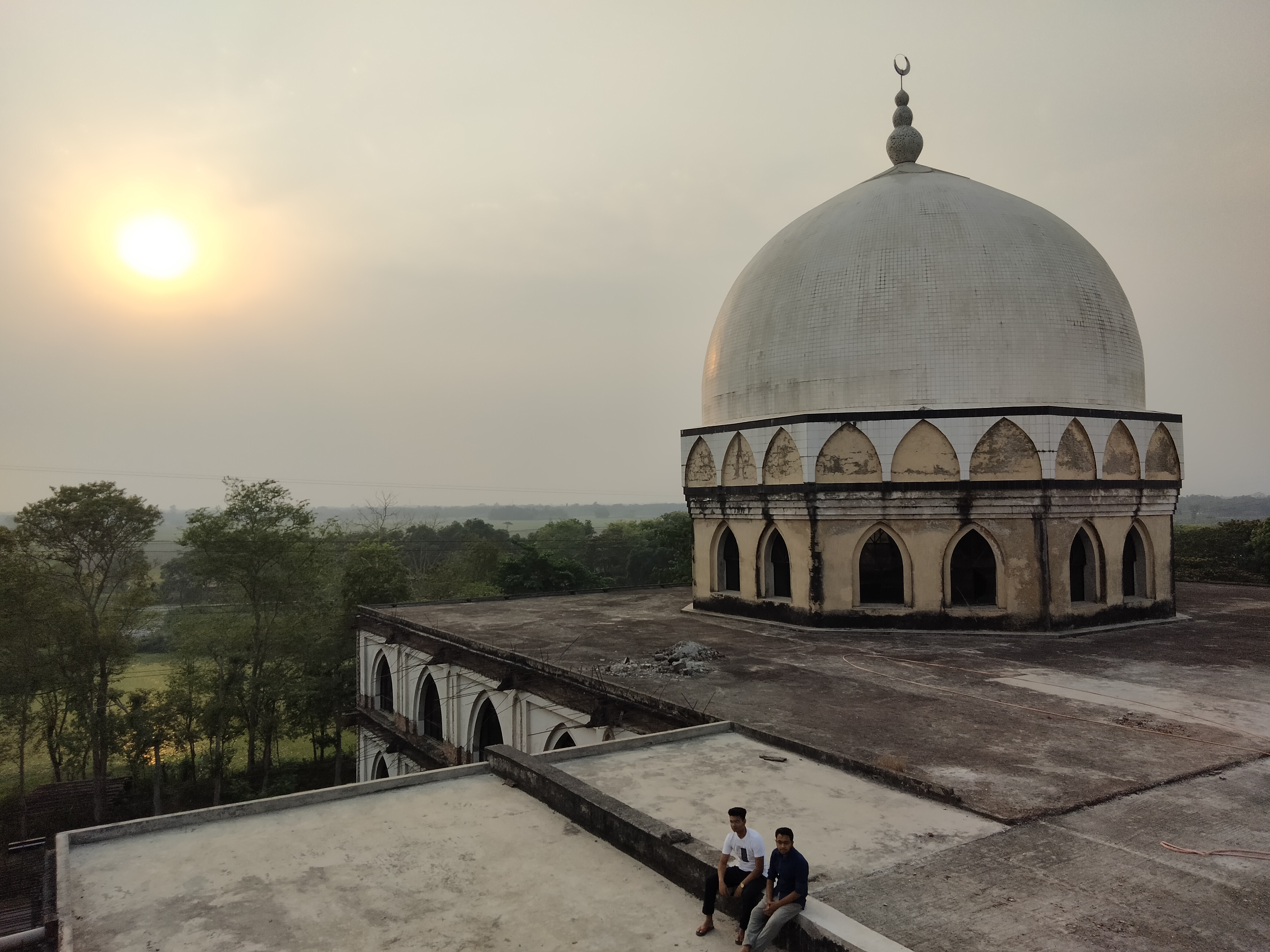
Tall minaret with sunset

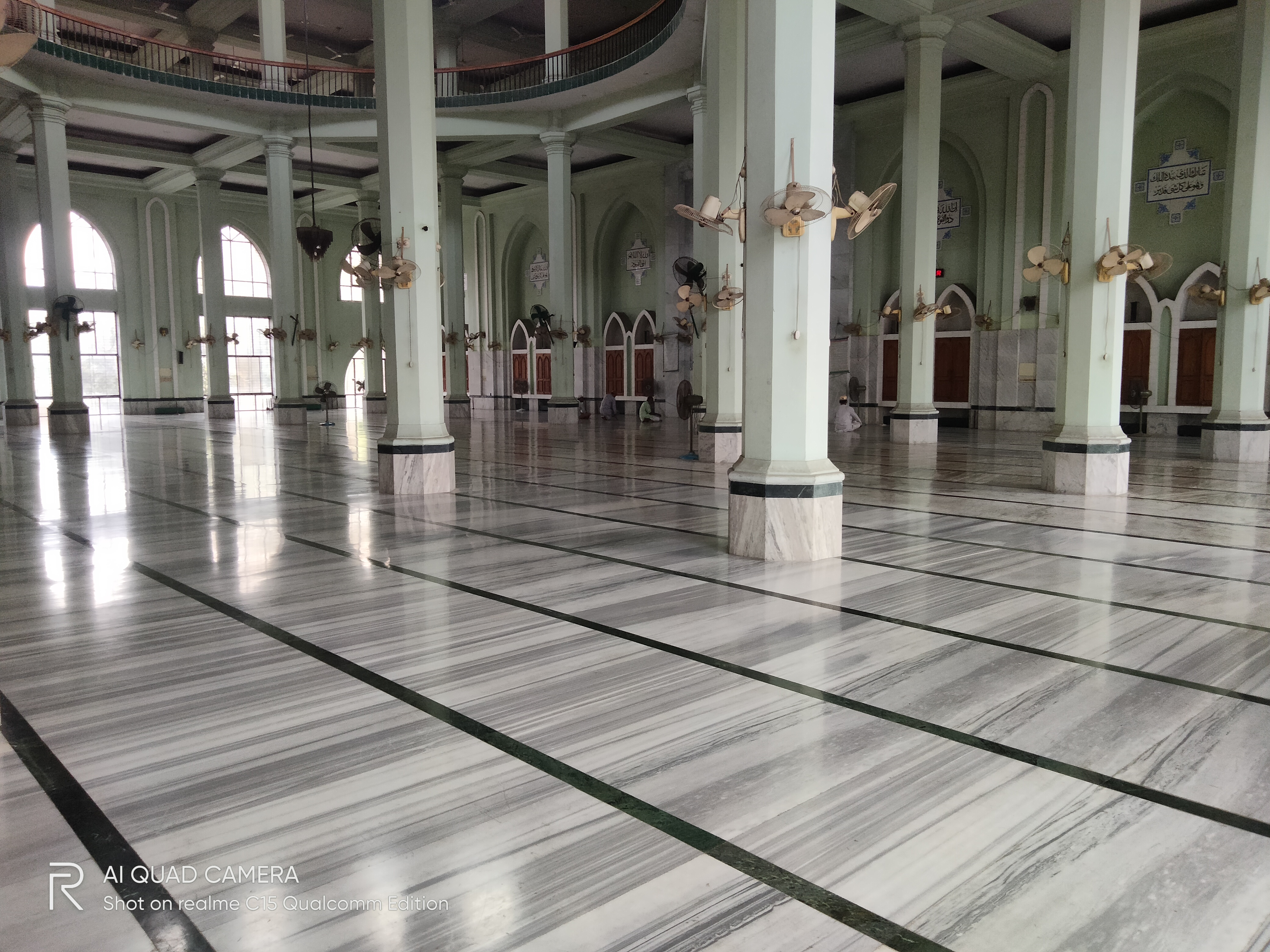
Interior of the mosque

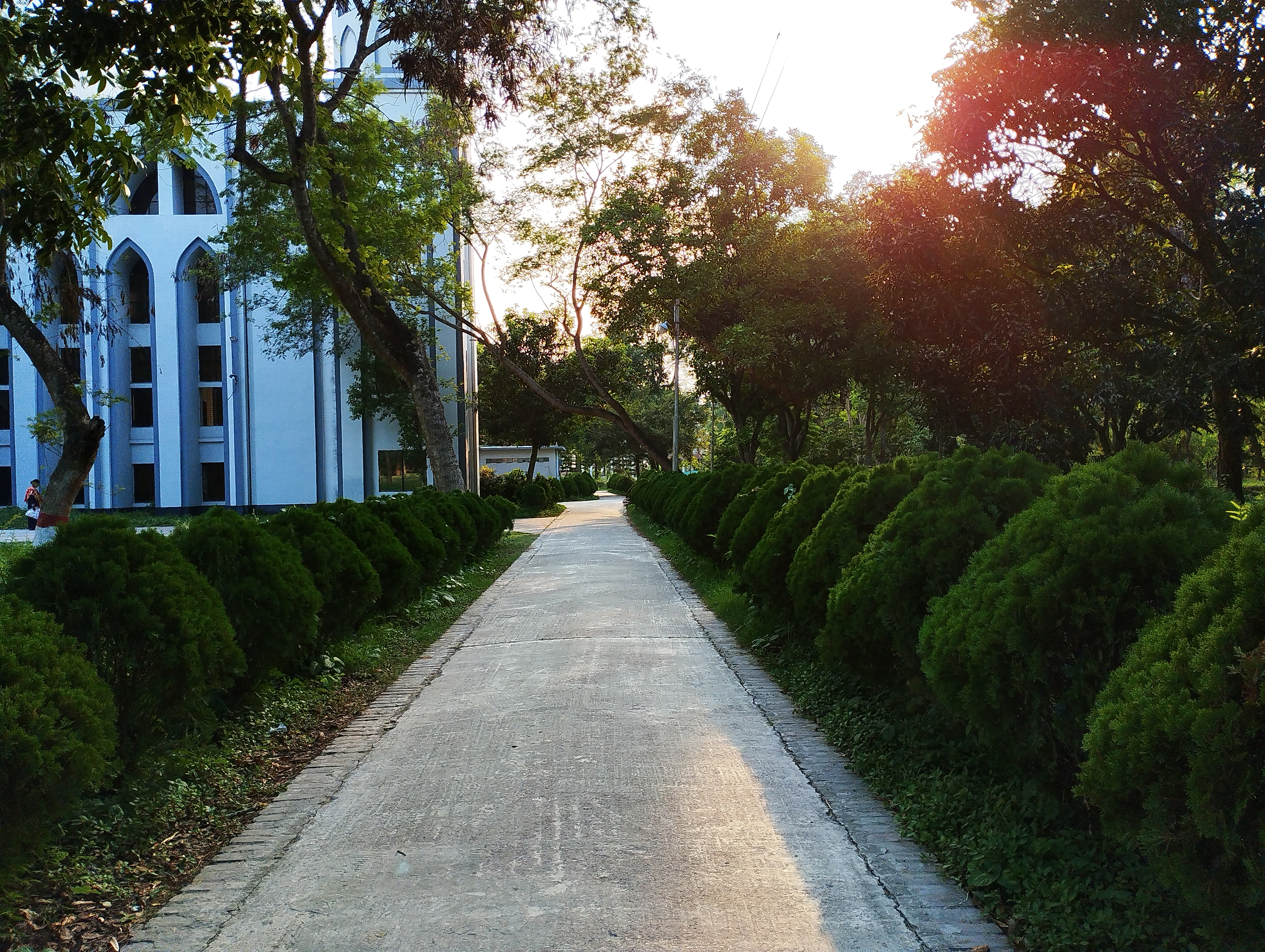
Road adjacent to the mosque

== See also ==
- Jhaudia Shahi Mosque
