= Bangladesh Jatiya Party =

Political party in Bangladesh

Bangladesh Jatiya Party বাংলাদেশ জাতীয় পার্টি
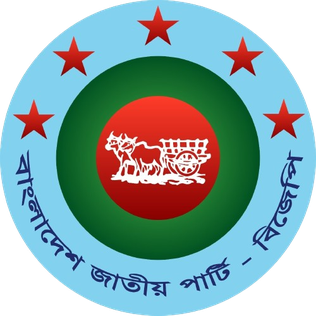
- Abbreviation: BJP
- Chairman: Andaleeve Rahman Partho
- Secretary-General: Abdul Matin Saud
- Founder: Naziur Rahman Manzur
- Split from: Jatiya Party (Ershad)
- Headquarters: 50 D.I.T. Extension Road, Ishtarnabhit, Naya Paltan, Dhaka
- Student wing: Bangladesh Jatiya Chhatra Samaj
- Youth wing: Bangladesh Jatiya Jubo Sanghoti
- Ideology: Bangladeshi nationalism
- Colours: Gold
- Jatiya Sangsad: 1 / 350

Election symbol
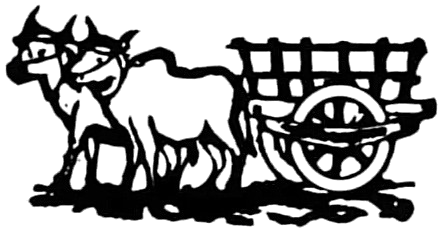
- Cow Cart

Party flag
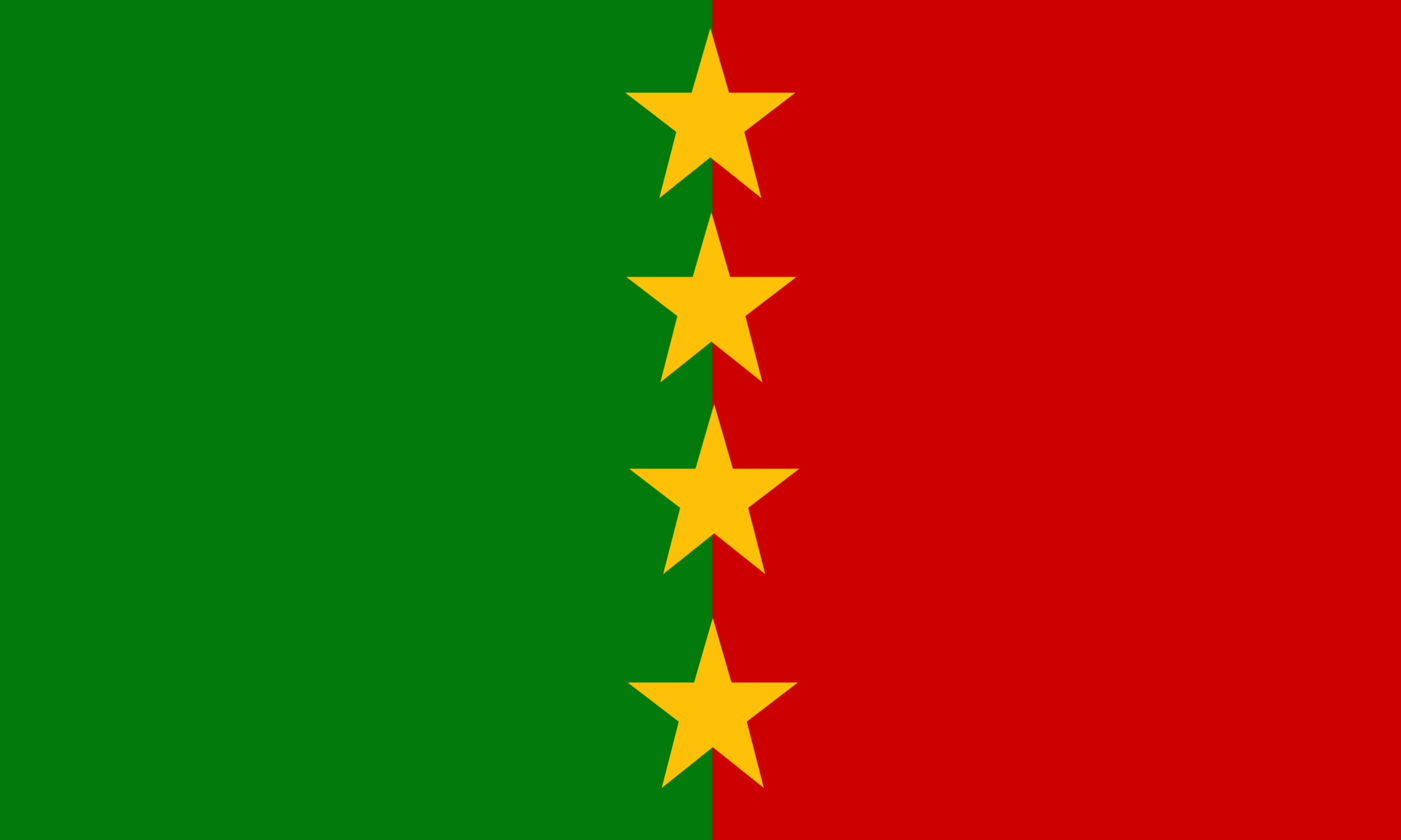

The Bangladesh Jatiya Party (Bengali: বাংলাদেশ জাতীয় পার্টি, lit. 'Bangladesh National Party'), simply known as BJP, is a political party in Bangladesh. It is a splinter group of the original Jatiya Party, founded by the former President Hossain Mohammad Ershad. It was previously known as Jatiya Party (Naziur), after the late party chairman Naziur Rahman Manzur. Manzur was a Mukti Bahini member in the Bangladesh War of Independence of 1971 and served as the local government and rural development minister and mayor of Dhaka City Corporation under Ershad's regime. Manzur also served as the secretary general of the Jatiya Party between 1998 and 2001.

After developing policy differences with Jatiya Party chairman Ershad in early 2001, Manzur formed the Bangladesh Jatiya Party – BJP on 5 August 2001 and maintained the 4-Party Alliance led by Bangladesh Nationalist Party (BNP). The party secured four electoral seats in the 8th National Parliament.

== In 4-party alliance coalition government (2001–2006) ==
On 14 January 2004, the party's chairman Naziur Rahman Manjur reminded BNP chairperson and the then-prime minister Khaleda Zia of her commitment in the parliament to hang the portraits of national leaders, including Sheikh Mujibur Rahman, at government offices. Bangladesh Jamaat-e-Islami secretary-general Ali Ahsan Mohammad Mojaheed objected to Manjur's remarks, saying his party would not support any move to hang Mujib's portrait at government offices. "You are controversial as razakars for your opposition to the Liberation War. You don't have any right to suggest anything about Bangabandhu," an incensed Manjur thundered on hearing Mujahid's comments. Khaleda and other key leaders kept silent, but BNP standing committee member Khandaker Mosharraf Hossain stepped in to restore calm.

The party, on 7 April 2005 blasted the government and the BNP high-ups for harboring extremist elements and establishing an alternative power center at Hawa Bhaban. Addressing an extended meeting of its central committee in the capital, the BJP leaders also came down heavily on the government for the price hike of essential commodities and deaths in the Rapid Action Battalion (RAB) custody. In a resolution, the meeting expressed concern over the 'improper formation' of the 4-Party Alliance government and non-implementation of the pledges spelled out in the election manifesto of the alliance.

It said the alliance's election commitment was to separate the judiciary from the executive, give autonomy to the state-owned radio and television, hold Upazila Parishad elections, create employment and control price of essentials. The BJP leaders were critical of BNP, the coalition leader, for not incorporating all partners in the cabinet where only two Jamaat leaders were included from the three other components of the alliance formed before 2001 polls. Many BJP leaders termed Jamaat a fundamentalist force while party chairman Naziur Rahman Manjur without naming any party said the government must take action against the fundamentalist forces. "BNP is patronising the fundamentalist and extremist forces in the country," Manjur told the meeting expressing serious concern over the growth of religious extremism. He said that instead of establishing Islamic values BNP is extending help to the fundamentalist forces. The BJP leaders also criticised the opposition political parties for creating an anarchic situation in the country through national and international conspiracies. They called upon the government to initiate open dialogue with major political parties on reforms of the election commission and other demands. Leaders of the BJP central committee and 56 district units spoke at the meeting and almost all of them expressed similar views about the coalition government's performances in the last three and a half years. Many BJP leaders demanded that its top brasses take a quick decision whether the party will be with the alliance or not. "BJP is not a leased property of any other party," the BJP chairman said responding to his party leaders' views.

Manjur said, "The government should hold discussions with all on reforms of the existing election system and other demands raised by different quarters." Manjur, also expressed his frustration over the rise of political violence and held all political parties responsible for the situation. He blamed the government for its failure to keep the prices of essentials under control. "People will reject BNP if it fails to reduce the price hikes," he said. Pointing to a senior minister's recent statement about negligible hike in rice price, the BJP chief said, "Don't tell lie about the prices of essentials. Visit the kitchen markets and give statements whether prices have increased or not." Referring to the killings in RAB custody, Manjur said the extra- judicial killings have to be stopped. Several BJP leaders blamed BNP for establishing an alternative power center at Hawa Bhaban. Advocate Abdul Halim from Sylhet said BNP has introduced a dual rule by the Prime Minister's Office and the Hawa Bhaban.

== Current situation ==
At present, the party is registered with the Election Commission of Bangladesh as Bangladesh Jatiya Party-BJP, to differentiate it from the splinter group Bangladesh Jatiya Party formerly led by Mohammad Abdul Matin. The party, at present, is chaired by late Naziur's son, barrister and MP Andaleeve Rahman Partho. Andaleeve along with his younger brother Dr. Ashikur Rahman Shanto contested in the 2008 general election from Bhola-1 and Bhola-2.

On 29 November 2013, Shanto, a member of the party's central committee, cited irreconcilable ideological differences with the party's coalition with the BNP, which then grew to become the 20-Party coalition. Coinciding with his father's pro-Mujib views, he stated in an interview, "I think the time has come for all political parties to leave Jamaat-e-Islam [sic]; I do not want to continue politics with Jamaat...we should not compromise with any undemocratic and anti-Liberation War forces. My father was a freedom fighter. So, I cannot be a part of any alliance that is involved with Jamaat."

Party chair Partho, however, argued, "Ashik does not want to continue with destructive politics and so left the party. But, the country needs brilliant people like him". In May 2019, the party left BNP-led coalition, now the 20-Party Alliance.

== See also ==
- Bangla Jatiya Dal
- List of political parties in Bangladesh
- Bangladesh Nationalist Party
- Bangladesh Jamaat-e-Islami
