= Nasir Ahmed (poet) =

- Born: December 5, 1952 (age 73); Backergunge District, East Bengal, Dominion of Pakistan
- Occupations: Poet, journalist, lyricist
- Awards: Bangla Academy Literary Award (2010)

Nasir Ahmed (born 5 December 1952) is a Bangladeshi poet, journalist, and lyricist. He received the Bangla Academy Literary Award in 2010 for his contribution to poetry.

== Early life and education ==
Nasir Ahmed was born on 5 December 1952 in the village of Alinagar, Bhola Sadar Upazila, Bhola District, now in Bangladesh.

He obtained his postgraduate degree in Bengali from the University of Dhaka.

== Career ==
Nasir Ahmed was enlisted as a first-class lyricist at Radio Bangladesh and Bangladesh Television. He has been involved in journalism since 1977. He began his career with the weekly Ganomukti, and later worked at Dainik Bangla, Dainik Janakantha, Dainik Samakal, and Dainik Bartoman.

On 29 December 2014, he joined Bangladesh Television as a director of the news department. He retired in 2018.

== Literary works ==
1. Rongin Joto Chhora
2. Kobitasamagra-1
3. Protiksha Tomar Jonno
4. Nirbachito Kobita
5. Kobitashotok
6. Nirbachito Premer Kobita
7. Chhora Chhora Megh O Onnanno Golpo
8. Mati O Brishtir Moto
9. Ei Boshonte Tomake
10. Bhalo Thakar Nirdesh Ache
11. Mishe Jabo Tomar Shobuje
12. Tomar Jonno Oninda
13. Nijer Shonge Nijer Kotha
14. Bhalobashar Ei Pothe
15. Jhora Pataar Nrityokola
16. Shrabon-er Dukhopadaboli
17. Gole Jacche Akangkhar Mom
18. Bangabandhu O Bangladesh
19. Akulota Shuvrotar Jonno
20. Tomakei Ashalota
21. Brikkhomongol
22. Ekattorer Padaboli
23. Bidhbosto Shohor Chhere Jete Jete

== Awards ==
- Trayee Padak (1987)
- Kobi Mozammel Haque Padak (1991)
- Bangla Academy Literary Award (2010)
- Bishnu Dey Award
- BACHSAS Award (twice, Drama)
- Lalon Award (Music)
- Michael Madhusudan Dutt Award
- Bangladesh Lekhika Sangha Award
- Standard Educare Gold Medal
- Kabyokola Award
