= Giasuddin Al Mamun =

Bangladeshi politician

Giasuddin Al Mamoon
- গিয়াসউদ্দিন আল মামুন
- Other name: মামুন
- Occupation: Businessman
- Political party: Bangladesh Nationalist Party
- Spouse: Shahina Yasmin
- Relatives: Hafiz Ibrahim (brother); Fabia Mamoon (daughter); Jawwad Mamoon (son); Jannat Mamoon (daughter)

Giasuddin Al Mamun is a Bangladeshi businessman. He is a friend and business partner of Tarique Rahman. Mamun owned the television channel Channel 1.

He was accused in more than 19 cases relating to extortion, corruption, illegal arms possession, and tax evasion.

== Career ==
Mamoon was a school friend of Tarique Rahman. In 1991, he became a businessman with an investment of Tk. 39,000. By 1996, his wealth reached Tk. 33.94 crore with 45 banks accounts in Bangladesh and abroad. He accumulated even more money during the rule of the next BNP-led coalition government from 2001 to 2006 due to his close relations with Tarique Rahman, son of former Prime minister and BNP politician, Begum Khaleda Zia. He earned hundred of crores of taka by selling concrete poles to the Rural Electrification Board via his business firm, Khamba Ltd.

== Charges and convictions ==
Mamun was arrested by the police in 2006 during the 2006–08 Bangladeshi political crisis on an illegal arms case. His house was raided and an illegal revolver was found, because of which he was sentenced to 10 years of imprisonment. The raid came after an official of Abdul Monem Limited filed a case against Mamun for taking Tk. 1.17 crore as extortion. Mamun was prosecuted by the Anti-Corruption Commission (ACC) for acquiring Tk. 101 crore beyond his known source of income in May 2007. In 2008, a court in Dhaka ordered a 10-year prison term for Mamun and 3 years for his wife, Shahina Yasmin, after the charges were proven. Yasmin surrendered to the court in April 2010 and was sent to prison. The High Court acquitted them of the charges in 2012 but the Supreme Court cancelled the High Court verdict in November 2015.

In 2009, Mamun was prosecuted by ACC on a charge of laundering Tk. 204 million to Singapore. In 2011, an FBI agent, Debra Laprevotte, testified against Mamun in court. He was sentenced to seven years in jail and fined Tk. 400 million in November 2013 in a Dhaka court by Third Special Judge Motahar Hossain. His co-defendant, Tarique Rahman, was acquitted. Justice Motahar left the country soon after declaring his verdict.

In July 2016, the High Court reduced Mamun's fine to Tk 200 million. In April 2019, Mamun was further sentenced to 7 years in prison on a money laundering case in which he was convicted of laundering £400 thousand to the United Kingdom.

In June 2022, the Anti-Corruption Commission (ACC) filed a graft case accusing 21 individuals, including Mamun as managing director of One Spinning Mills Ltd. and director AHM Jahangir (alias Abu Hasan Mohammad Jahangir), of embezzling over Tk 32.67 crore from Sonali Bank via a 2004 letter of credit for machinery imports without repayment or mortgage. Mamun was granted bail on 6 August 2024. after the fall of former Prime Minister Sheikh Hasina.

On 5 December 2024, he was acquitted by the high court of Bangladesh in the money laundering case.

== Personal life ==
Mamun was married to Shahina Yeasmin, with whom he has 3 children. She was jailed in 2010 after charges against her of amassing Tk. 9.22 crore illegally were not proven. His brother is Hafiz Ibrahim, a BNP politician from Bhola District. His father, Zainul Abedin, was a former pilot of the Pakistan Air Force. His mother, Mosammat Halima Khatun, died on 25 September 2019 at a hospital in Dhaka.
