= Jhaudia Union =

Jhaudia Union ঝাউদিয়া ইউনিয়ন
- Union
- Jhaudia Union
- Location within Bangladesh
- Coordinates: 23.7723°N 89.0655°E
- Country: Bangladesh
- Division: Khulna
- District: Kushtia
- Upazila: Kushtia Sadar

Area
  - Total: 69.20 km^{2} (26.72 sq mi)

Population (2011)
  - Total: 25,772
  - Density: 372.4/km^{2} (964.6/sq mi)
- Time zone: UTC+6 (BST)
- Website: 9nojhaudiaup.kushtia.gov.bd

Jhaudia Union (Bengali: ঝাউদিয়া ইউনিয়ন) is a union parishad situated at Kushtia Sadar Upazila, in Kushtia District, Khulna Division of Bangladesh. The union has an area of 69.20 square kilometres (26.72 sq mi) and as of 2001 had a population of 25,772. There are 11 villages and 7 mouzas in the union.

== History ==
Jhaudia was listed in the Ain-i-Akbari as a mahal in sarkar Mahmudabad. It was listed with an assessed revenue of 9,125 dams (this translation spells the name "Chhádúiyá or Chháddiya").
