= Nizam Uddin Ahmed (Bhola politician) =

Bangladeshi politician

Member of Bangladesh Parliament
- In office February 1996 – June 1996

Personal details
- Party: Bangladesh Nationalist Party

Nizam Uddin Ahmed is a Bangladesh Nationalist Party politician and a former member of parliament for Bhola-2.

== Career ==
Ahmed was elected to parliament from Bhola-2 as a Bangladesh Nationalist Party candidate in February 1996.
