= Mosharraf Hossain Shahjahan =

Bangladeshi politician

Minister of State for Religious Affairs
- In office 10 October 2001 – 29 October 2006
- Prime Minister: Khaleda Zia
- Preceded by: Abdul Malik
- Succeeded by: Mahbubul Alam

Minister of State for Water Resources
- In office 19 September 1991 – 30 March 1996
- Prime Minister: Khaleda Zia
- Preceded by: Ansar Ali Siddiqui
- Succeeded by: Abdul Mannan Bhuiyan

Member of Parliament
- In office 10 October 2001 – 29 October 2006
- Preceded by: Tofail Ahmed
- Succeeded by: Andaleeve Rahman
- Constituency: Bhola-1
- In office 19 September 1991 – 1 June 1996
- Preceded by: Siddiqur Rahman
- Succeeded by: Tofail Ahmed
- Constituency: Bhola-2
- In office 1979–1986
- Preceded by: Tofail Ahmed
- Succeeded by: Sunil Kumar Gupta
- Constituency: Barisal-1

Personal details
- Born: 19 September 1939 Bhola, Bengal Presidency, British India
- Died: 5 May 2012 (aged 72) Gulshan, Dhaka, Bangladesh
- Party: Bangladesh Nationalist Party

Mosharraf Hossain Shahjahan (19 September 1939 – 5 May 2012) was a Bangladesh Nationalist Party politician and a former member of parliament from Bhola-1. He was elected to parliament 6 times from Bhola. He was a former state minister of religious affairs.

== Birth and early life ==
Shahjahan was born on 19 September 1939 in Bhola District.

== Career ==
Shahjahan joined the Bangladesh Nationalist Party soon after its founding. He became the organizing secretary of Khulna District unit of the party. In 1991 he was made the state minister for water resources in the first cabinet of Prime Minister Khaleda Zia and in 2001 he was appointed state minister of religious affairs in the second cabinet of Khaleda Zia.

== Death ==
Shahjahan died on 5 May 2012 in United Hospital, Dhaka, Bangladesh.
