= Naziur Rahman Manzur =

Bangladeshi politician

- নাজিউর রহমান মঞ্জুর

Minister of Local Government and Rural Development
- In office 10 July 1986 – 6 December 1990
- President: Hussain Muhammad Ershad
- Prime Minister: Ataur Rahman Khan; Mizanur Rahman Chowdhury; Moudud Ahmed; Kazi Zafar Ahmed
- Preceded by: Abdul Halim Chowdhury
- Succeeded by: Abdus Salam Talukder

3rd Mayor of Dhaka
- In office 9 October 1989 – 2 December 1990
- Preceded by: Mohammad Abdul Malek
- Succeeded by: Abul Hasnat

Member of Parliament
- In office 10 July 1986 – 6 December 1990
- Preceded by: Position established
- Succeeded by: Tofail Ahmed
- Constituency: Bhola-1

Personal details
- Born: 15 March 1948 Bhola, East Bengal, Dominion of Pakistan
- Died: 6 April 2008 (aged 60) Dhaka, Bangladesh
- Party: Bangladesh Jatiya Party
- Other political affiliations: Jatiya Party (Ershad)
- Spouse: Sheikh Reba Rahman
- Relations: Sheikh Fazlul Haque Mani (brother-in-law); Sheikh Selim (brother-in-law); Sheikh Helal Uddin (brother-in-law)
- Children: 3, including Partho

Military service
- Branch/service: Mukti Bahini
- Years of service: 1971
- Battles/wars: Bangladesh Liberation War

Naziur Rahman Manzur (Bengali: নাজিউর রহমান মঞ্জুর; 15 March 1948 – 6 April 2008) was a Bangladesh Jatiya Party politician, founding chairman of the party, former government minister in the cabinet of Hussain Mohammad Ershad and the first mayor (elected by commissioners) of Dhaka City Corporation.

== Early life ==
Manzur was born on 15 March 1948 into an esteemed and aristocratic Bengali Muslim family on Bhola Island, situated in what was then the Bakerganj District of East Bengal in the Dominion of Pakistan. His father, Bazlur Rahman Taluqdar, traced his lineage back to Munga Khan, a notable figure who originally hailed from Garmsir in Afghanistan. Their ancestry was linked to the Mughal Emperor Akbar the Great.

In the 18th century, Munga Khan, a powerful established himself in the greater Barisal region of Bengal. His influence and status grew significantly, and his son, Shaykh Muhammad, rose to prominence within the Mughal court, serving as a shiqdar – a distinguished title granted by the emperor himself. This esteemed position not only cemented the family’s status in Bengal but also solidified their ties to the imperial Mughal power. Over time, their family became a well-respected name in the region.

The family's roots extended even deeper into history, originating from the grand aristocracy of Murshidabad – the seat of the Nawabs of Bengal. It was said that their ancestors held a prominent role in the Mughal administration during the height of Bengal's power. However, the political upheavals of the time eventually led the family to migrate southward, where they settled in Balia, retaining their noble status and continuing their legacy of leadership in the region.

== Career ==
In the 1980s he served as a minister in the cabinet of Hossain Mohammad Ershad and was a member of his Jatiya party. In 1999, Ershad had an alliance with the Khaleda Zia led Bangladesh Nationalist party which was the opposition party. Ershad decided to quit the alliance but a fraction of Jatiya Party leaders led by Naziur Rahman Manzur decided to quite the party and remain in the alliance led by Bangladesh Nationalist Party. This fraction became the Bangladesh Jatiya Party.

== Personal life ==
Manzur has three sons. His eldest, Andaleeve Rahman, is the present chairman of the party and a former member of parliament. His second son, Dr. Ashikur Rahman Shanto, resigned from the Jatiya Party in 2013, highlighting differences with Bangladesh Jamaat-e-Islami, which remains a key party in the BNP-led 20-party alliance. His third son is Wasikur Rahman. Manzur is married to Sheikh Reba Rahman. He also has several brothers, including Dr. Azizur Rahman, Mustafizur Rahman, and Mujibur Rahman.

== Death ==
Manzur died on 6 April 2008 in BIRDEM hospital, Dhaka, Bangladesh.
