= Andaleeve Rahman =

Bangladeshi politician

Andaleeve Rahman Partho
- আন্দালিব রহমান পার্থ
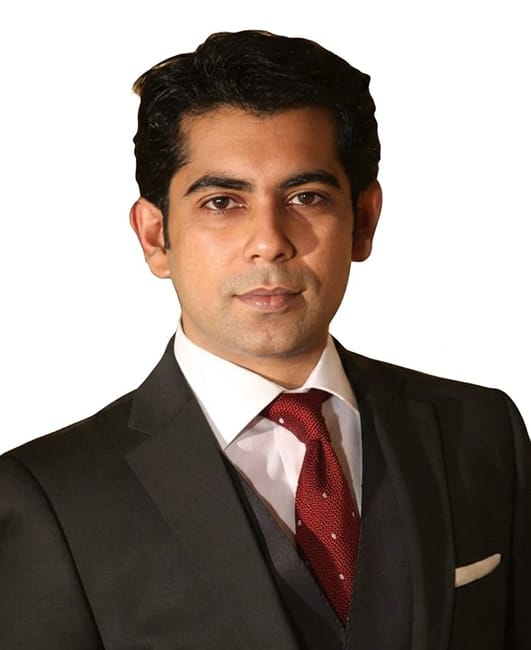
- Official portrait, 2026

Minister of Information and Broadcasting
- Incumbent
- Assumed office 21 August 2026
- Prime Minister: Tarique Rahman
- Preceded by: Zahir Uddin Swapon

Member of the Bangladesh Parliament for Bhola-1
- Incumbent
- Assumed office 17 February 2026
- Preceded by: Tofail Ahmed
- In office 29 December 2008 – 5 January 2014
- Preceded by: Mosharef Hossain Shahjahan
- Succeeded by: Tofail Ahmed

Chairman of the Bangladesh Jatiya Party
- Incumbent
- Assumed office 10 April 2008
- Secretary-General: Abdul Matin Saud
- Preceded by: Naziur Rahman Manzur

Personal details
- Born: 20 April 1974 (age 52) Dhaka, Bangladesh
- Party: Bangladesh Jatiya Party
- Spouse: Sheikh Shaira Rahman
- Children: 3
- Parent: Naziur Rahman Manzur (father)
- Relatives: see Sheikh Family
- Education: University of London
- Occupation: Politician
- Profession: Barrister, teacher

Andaleeve Rahman Partho (Bengali: আন্দালিব রহমান পার্থ, romanized: Āndālib Rôhômān Pārthô; born 20 April 1974) is a Bangladeshi barrister and politician who has served as the leader of the Bangladesh Jatiya Party since 2008 and minister for information and broadcasting since August 2026. A former chairman of the Parliamentary Standing Committee on the Ministry of Law, Justice and Parliamentary Affairs, Partho is also a member of parliament representing the Bhola-1 constituency. He was also the principal of the British School of Law in Dhaka.

== Early life ==
Partho was born on 20 April 1974 in Dhaka, Bangladesh. His father, Naziur Rahman Manzur, was a politician and former minister who served as the founding chairman of the Bangladesh Jatiya Party and as the mayor of Dhaka from 1989 to 1990. They belonged to a Bengali Muslim family of zamindars from Balia in Bhola Island. Through his paternal grandfather Bazlur Rahman, Andaleeve Rahman is a direct descendant of Munga Khan, an eighteenth-century figure who arrived in Bengal from Garmsir in Afghanistan and settled in the village of Saluka in greater Barisal. Khan's son, Shaykh Muhammad, was part of the landed aristocracy in Bhola's Balia and Gazaria areas, where the family established themselves as zamindars.

His mother is Sheikh Reba of the Sheikh family of Tungipara who are deeply involved in Bangladeshi politics and are also a zamindar family from the Faridpur region. They trace their lineage to a Sufi Dervish, Sheikh Abdul Awal, who likely came from Eastern Iran as part of a wider missionary group. Sheikh Mujibur Rahman, a leading figure in the Bangladesh Liberation War and the first president of Bangladesh also hailed from this clan.

Partho first studied at St. Joseph Higher Secondary School before going to London to pursue his LL.B. degree.

== Professional and legal career ==
Rahman passed the Bar Examination at Lincoln's Inn. He then returned to Bangladesh and worked as an apprentice under the supervision of Barrister Rafiqul Haque for five years. He is currently working as a lawyer in Dhaka and serves as principal of the British School of Law in Dhaka.

== Political career ==
Rahman has been actively involved in politics with his father, Naziur Rahman Manzur, for over 25 years. When his father died in April 2008, Rahman was elected chairman of the Bangladesh Jatiya Party. In the 2008 election to the Jatiya Sangsad, Rahman was elected as representative for Bhola-1 as a candidate for the four-party alliance, defeating Awami League candidate Yusuf Hossain Humayun. His party boycotted the 2014 election as part of the 18-Party Alliance led by the BNP. He became a candidate for the unity front and the 25-party alliance in the Dhaka-17 constituency in the 2018 parliamentary elections but lost to Awami League candidate Akbar Hossain Pathan Farooque. He collected nomination papers in Dhaka-17 and Bhola-3 seats.

== Electoral history ==
Year	Election	Constituency Name	Party	Result	Votes gained	Vote share%	Margin
2008	Jatiya Sangsad	Bhola-1	BJP	Won	95,158	53.20%	16,669
2018	Jatiya Sangsad	Dhaka-17	BJP	Lost	38,639	18.72%	125,971
2026	Jatiya Sangsad	Bhola-1	BJP	Won	105,543	49.51%	30,206

== Controversies ==
=== Commentary on Adviser Asif Mahmud ===
In August 2025, during the tenure of the interim government, Partho became the subject of public debate following a social media post concerning government adviser Asif Mahmud. The controversy originated from a press briefing where Adviser Asif Mahmud, responding to questions about his late-night activities, stated that he often went to Neela Market in the Purbachal 300 Feet area to eat duck meat after finishing his work. He further explained that on occasions when he found the market closed, he would go to The Westin Dhaka instead.

In response to the growing discussion, Partho published a post on his verified Facebook page, writing,

Once he searched for rice in the canteen, now he searches for duck in the Westin (Bengali: এক সময় ভাত খুঁজতো ক্যান্টিনে, এখন হাঁস খুঁজে ওয়েস্টিনে, romanized: Ek shomoy bhat khujto canteen-e, ekhon hash khuje Westin-e).

While the comment was widely shared, Partho himself faced a significant backlash. Critics accused him of elitism and snobbery, pointing out that Partho, who comes from a well-known political family, was targeting an adviser with a background in student politics who did not have the same privileged upbringing. This criticism was articulated by figures such as Sarwar Tushar of the National Citizen's Party (NCP), who accused Partho of exhibiting "blatant class hatred" and suggested he could not "accept that a student leader without any family legacy has become a minister of Bangladesh."
