= Ali Azam (Bhola politician) =

Bangladeshi politician (born 1972)

- আলি আজম

Member of the Bangladesh Parliament for Bhola-2
- In office 12 January 2014 – 6 August 2024
- Preceded by: Tofail Ahmed

Personal details
- Born: 3 August 1972 (age 53)
- Party: Bangladesh Awami League
- Occupation: Politician

Ali Azam (born 3 August 1972) is a Bangladesh Awami League politician and a former Jatiya Sangsad member representing the Bhola-2 constituency.

== Career ==
Azam was elected to parliament on 5 January 2014 as a Bangladesh Awami League candidate.

After the fall of the Sheikh Hasina-led Awami League government, the Rapid Action Battalion arrested him from Dhaka in November 2024.
