= Jhaudia Shahi Mosque =

Mosque in Kushtia, Khulna, Bangladesh

- ঝাউদিয়া শাহী মসজিদ
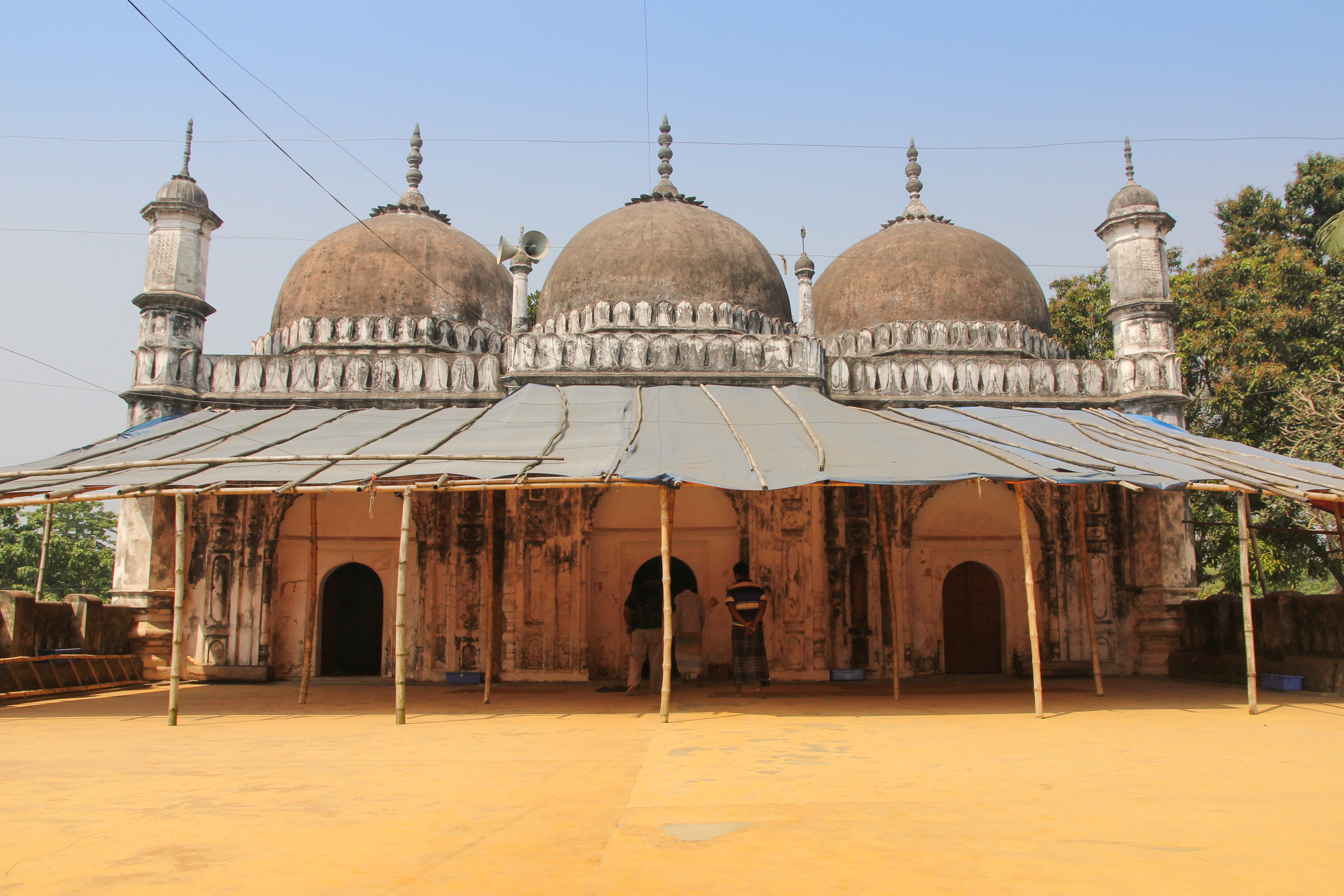

- Location of the mosque in Bangladesh Jhaudia Shahi Mosque (Bangladesh)

Religion
- Affiliation: Islam
- Ecclesiastical or organisational status: Mosque
- Status: Active

Location
- Location: Jhaudia, Kushtia Sadar Upazila, Kushtia District, Khulna Division
- Country: Bangladesh
- Administration: Department of Archaeology
- Coordinates: 23°46′30″N 89°03′19″E

Architecture
- Type: Mosque architecture
- Style: Mughal
- Completed: Mughal era

Specifications
- Length: 14.26 m (46.8 ft)
- Width: 4.6 m (15 ft)
- Dome: Five
- Minaret: Four
- Materials: Limestone; surki

The Jhaudia Shahi Mosque (Bengali: ঝাউদিয়া শাহী মসজিদ) is a mosque and archaeological site, located in Kushtia District of the Khulna Division of Bangladesh. The mosque was named Jhaudia Shahi Masjid according to the name of the village as it is located in Jhaudia village of Jhaudia union. Every Friday people come here from far and wide to fulfill their religious desires. For this, a fair is organized here every Friday by the authorities.

== History ==
Many legends are prevalent among the locals about the Jhaudia Mosque but its exact history is not known. According to legend, Shah Sufi Adari Mia of Iraq built a monastery in the region to spread Islam and he built this mosque at that time. However, according to popular belief, it is also believed that the mosque was built miraculously. Locals also believe that the Sufi saint's grave is next to the mosque.

The entrance of the present mosque mentions that it was built during the Mughal emperor Aurangzeb. But no archeological records have been found about it either. In 1969 it was registered in the list of Bangladesh Archeology Department. It is being supervised by Hasan Ali Chowdhury of Jhaudia village and his family members under the contract of the Directorate of Archaeology. However, currently the mosque is directly managed by the Department of Archaeology (Bangladesh).

== Architecture ==
The main structure of the Jhowdia Mosque consists of three domes and four towering minarets at the four corners. Brick, stone, sand and porcelain have been used in the construction of the mosque.

== Gallery ==
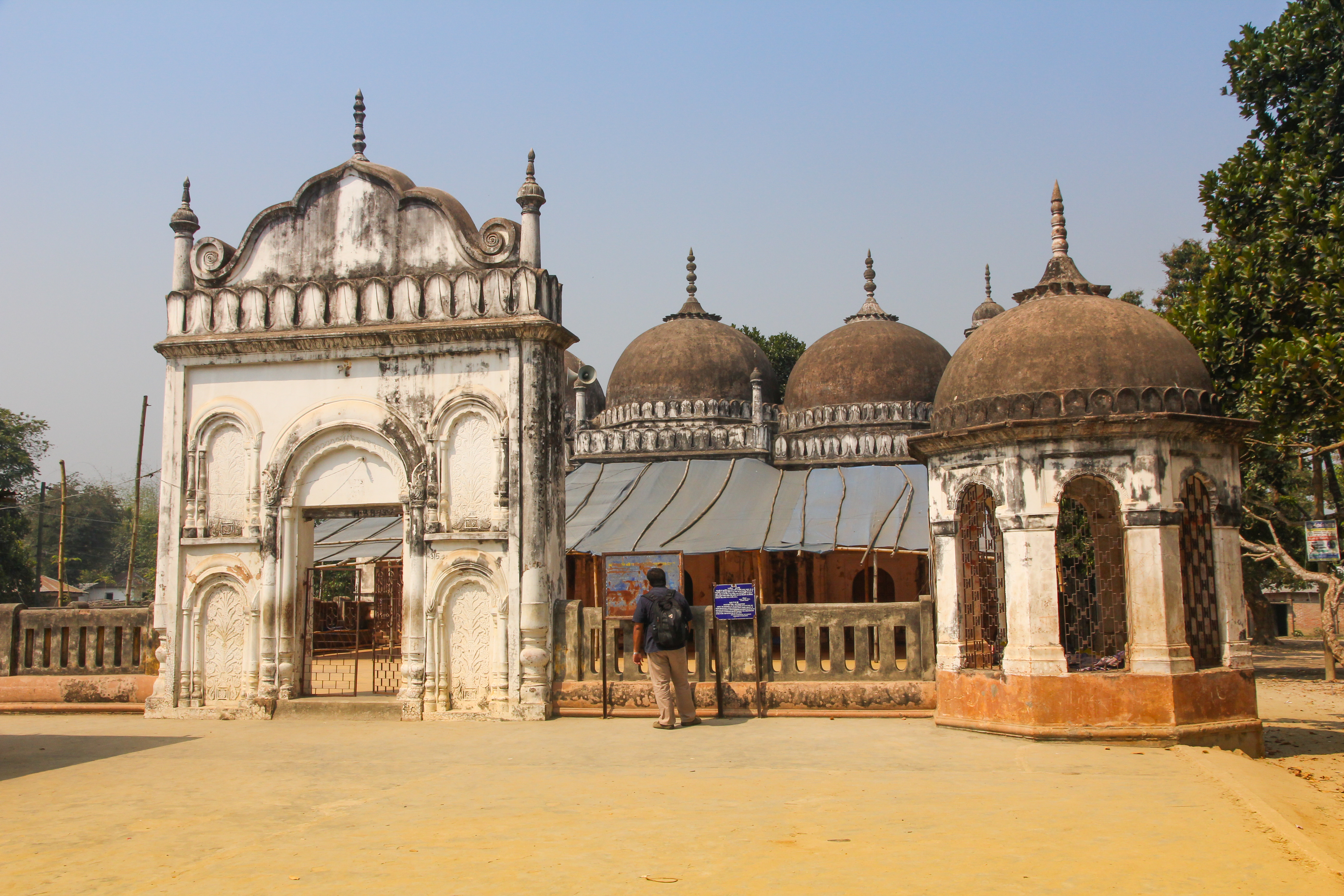

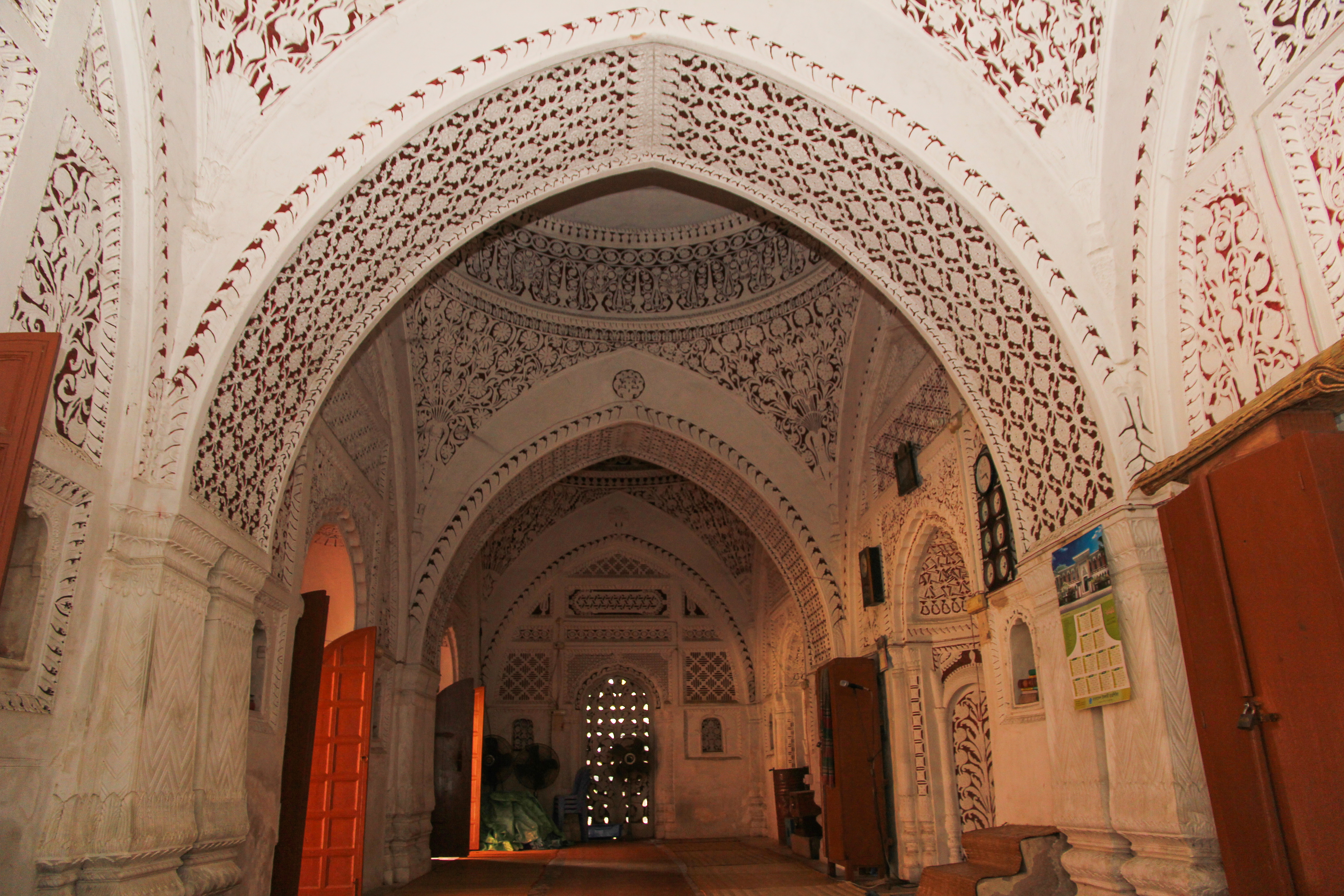

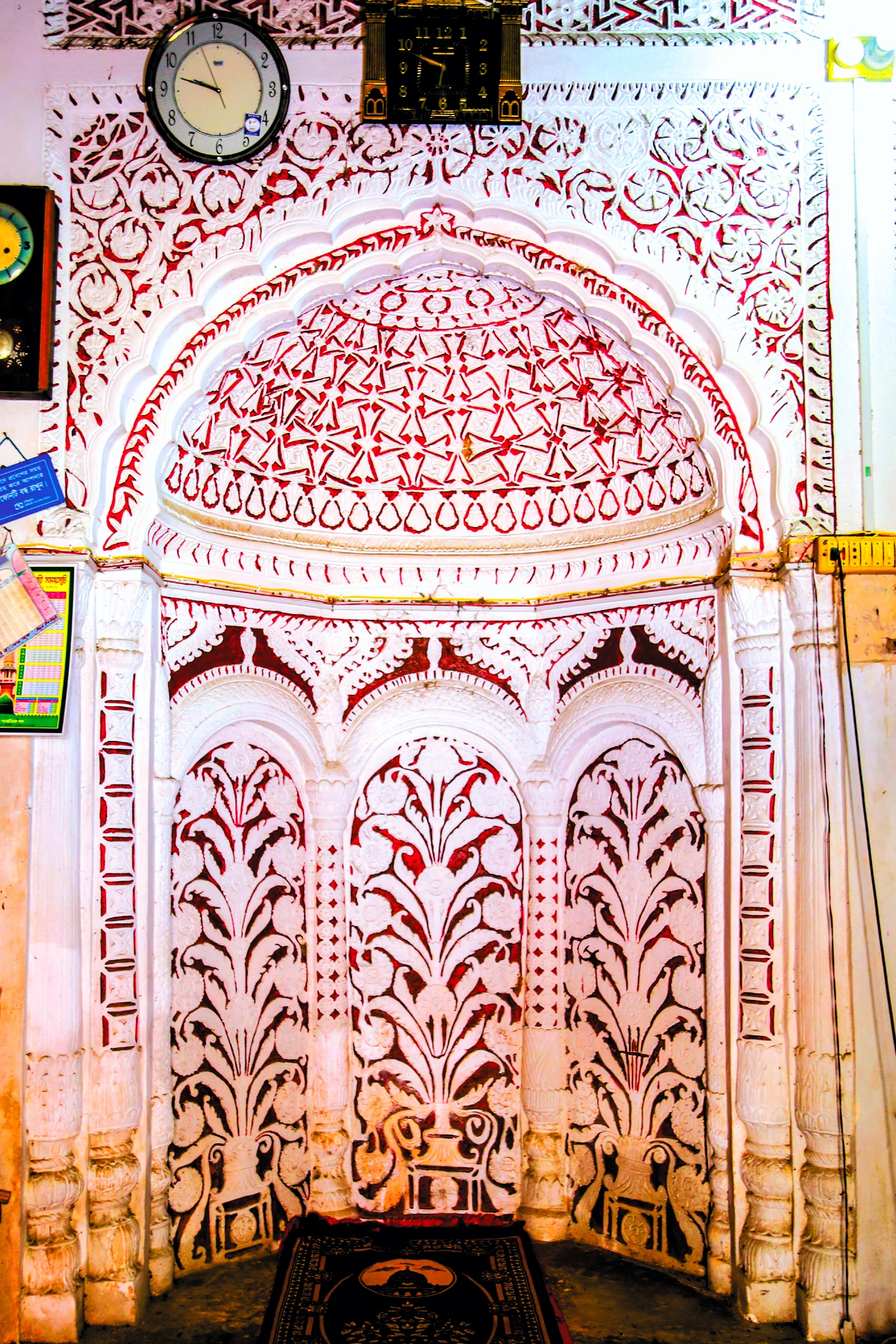

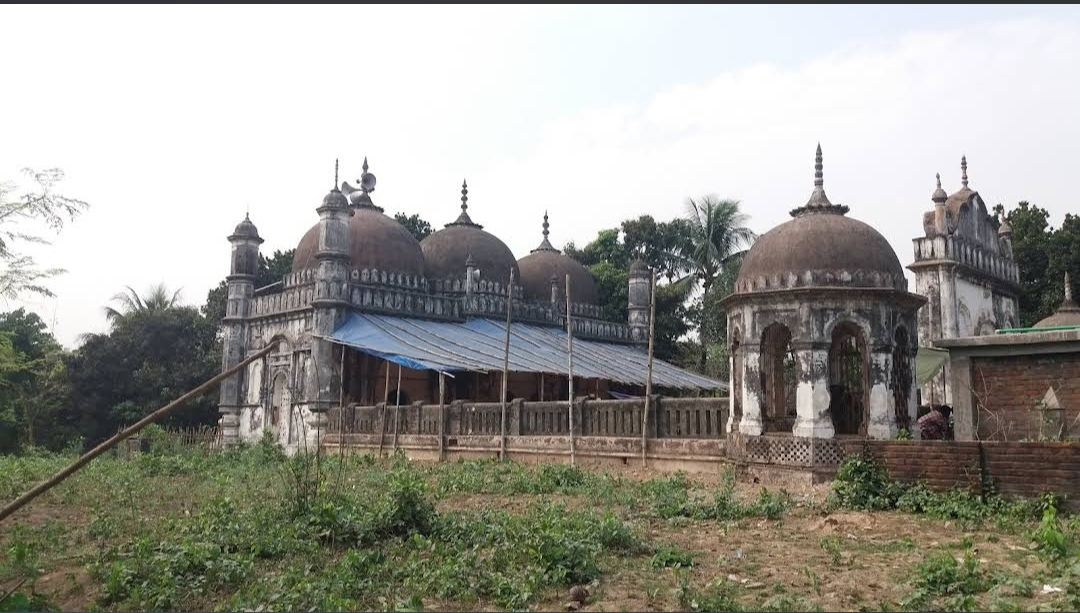

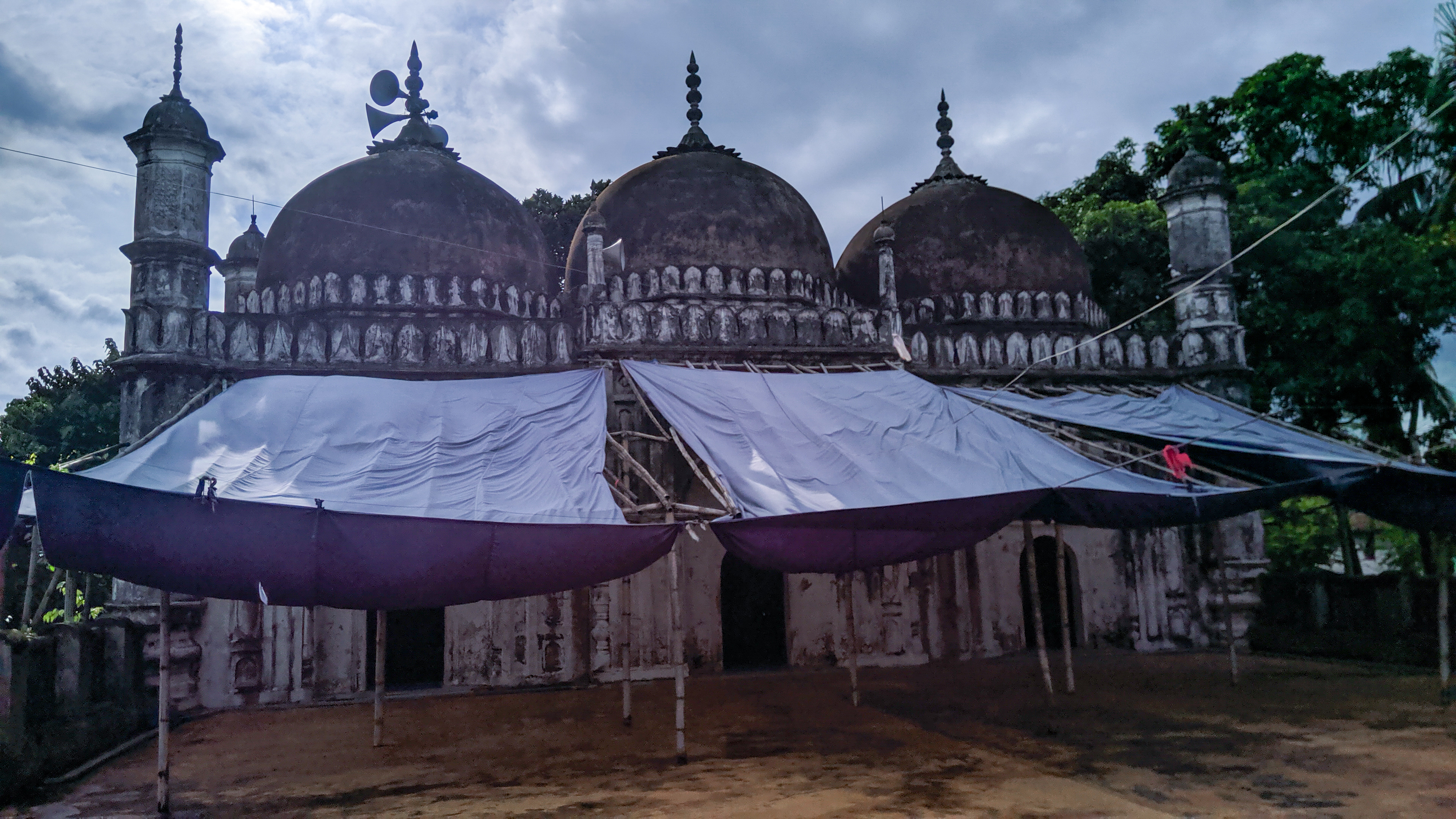

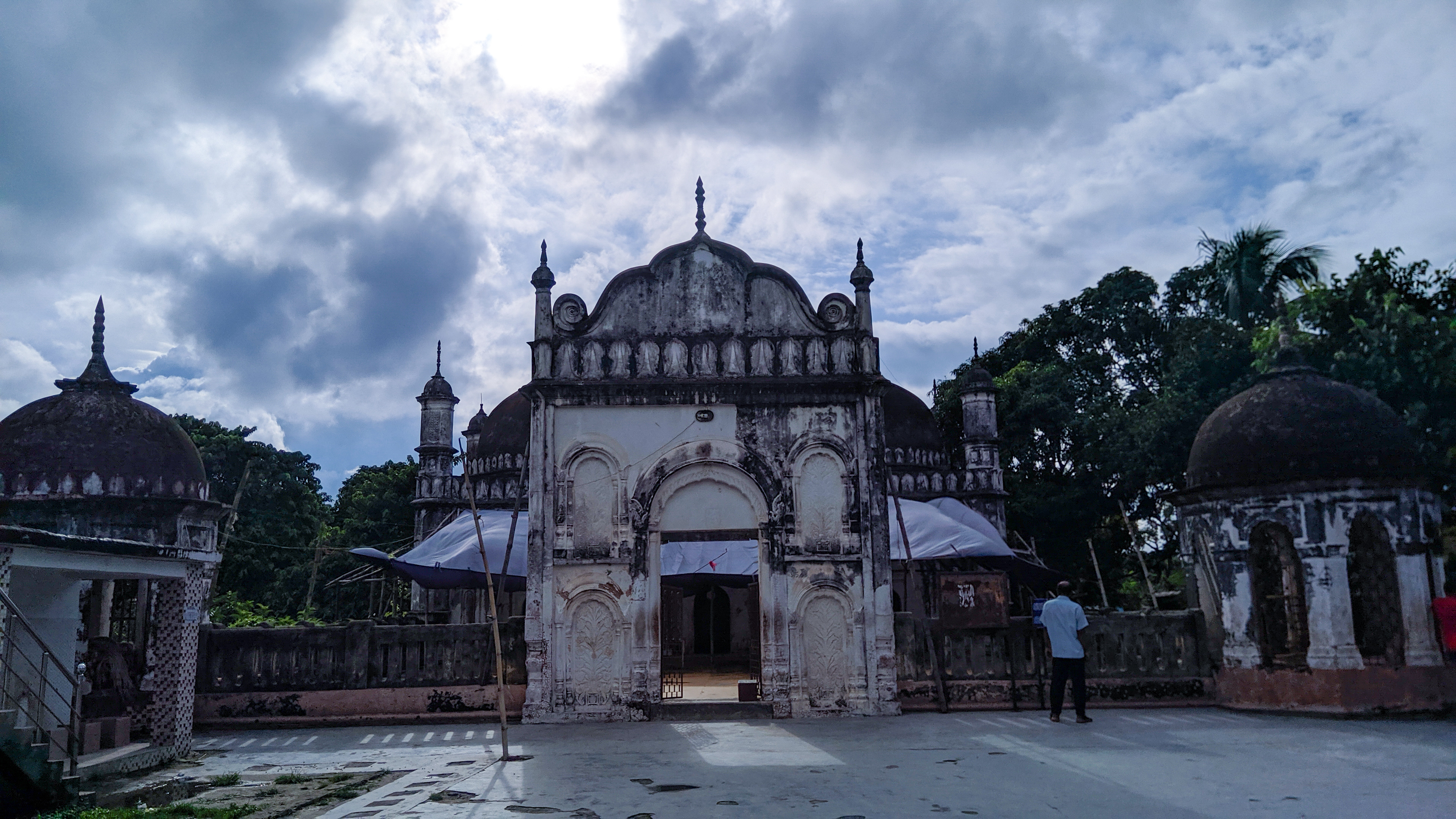

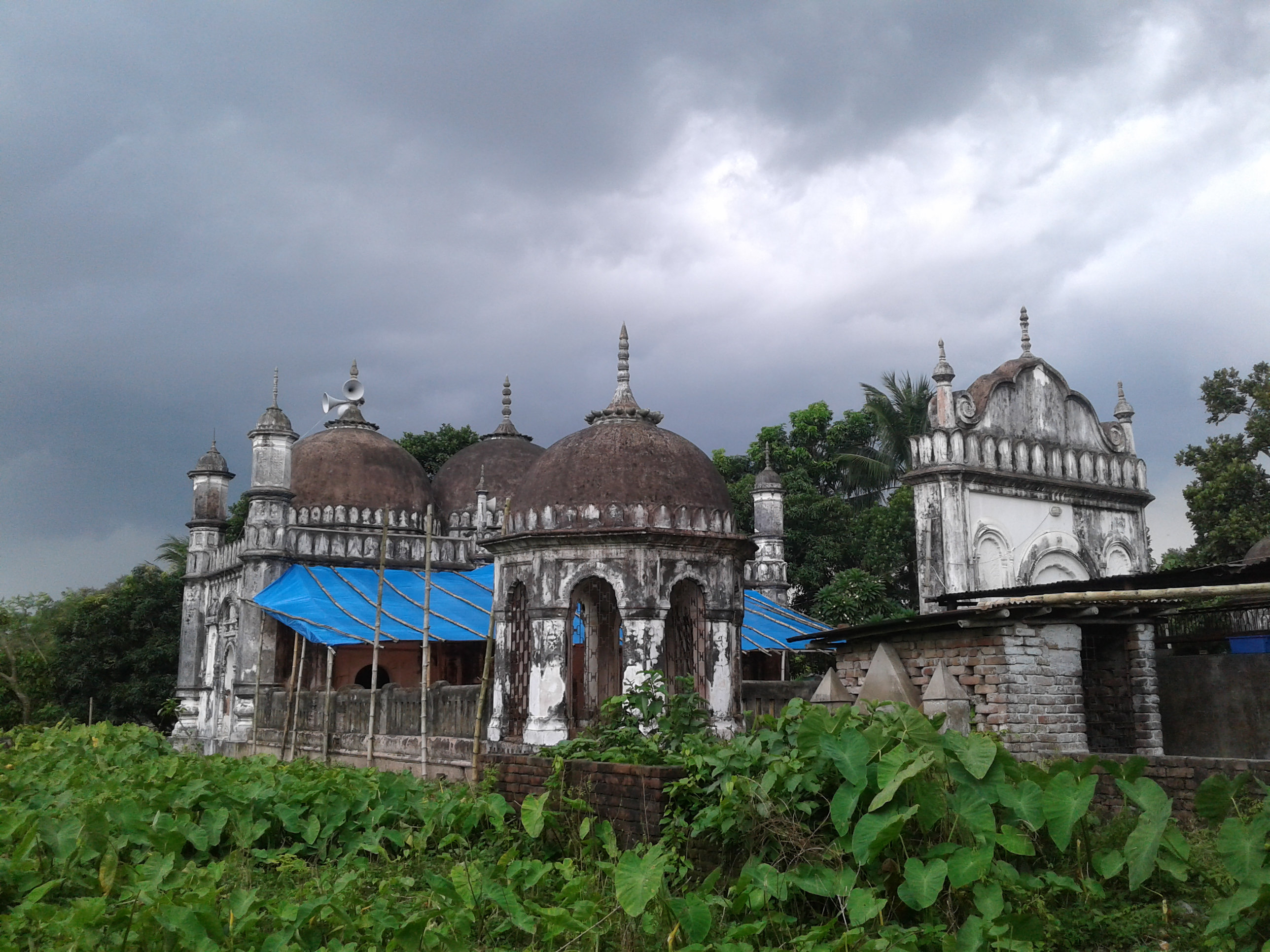

== See also ==
- Islam in Bangladesh
- List of mosques in Bangladesh
