= Jhalokathi N. S. Kamil Madrasah =

Educational institution in Bangladesh

Jhalakati N S Kamil Madrasa
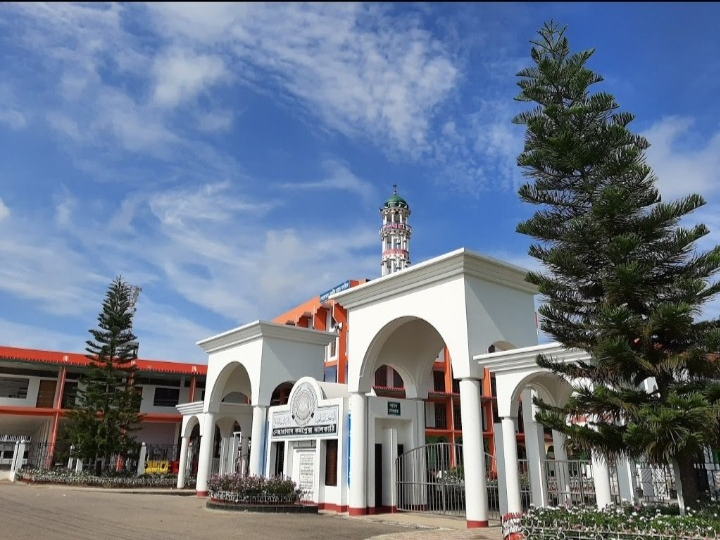
- Type: MPO affiliated
- Established: 1 January 1950
- Founder: Shaikhul Islam Allama Azizur Rahman Nesarabadi Qayed
- Academic affiliations: Islamic University, Bangladesh (2006–2016), Islamic Arabic University (2016–present)
- Principal: Maulana Mufti Gazi Muhammad Shahidul Islam
- Director: Shaikh Maulana Muhammad Khalilur Rahman Nesarabadi
- Students: 7000+
- Location: Jhalokathi, Bangladesh; 22.658071°N 90.195761°E

Jhalkathi N S Kamil Madrasa or Jamiah Salihiyyah Nesarabad is a renowned and nationally recognized educational institution located in Jhalokathi town, Barisal Division, Bangladesh. It is situated in the Basanda area of Jhalokathi District. The madrasa was founded in 1950 by Shaikhul Islam Allama Maulana Muhammad Azizur Rahman Nesarabadi. It offers courses in Dakhil, Alim, Fazil, and Kamil levels. The Dakhil and Alim levels are affiliated with the Bangladesh Madrasah Education Board, while the Fazil and Kamil programs are affiliated with the Islamic Arabic University. The madrasa consistently ranks among the top institutions in the country. Altogether, about 7,000 students study in Dakhil, Alim, Fazil, and Kamil classes.

== History ==
The prominent Islamic scholar Maulana Muhammad Azizur Rahman Qayed founded the institution in 1950 under the name *Furqania Madrasa*. It began as a small Maktab (religious school) in Bashanda village under Jhalokathi Municipality. In 1961, it was upgraded to the Dakhil level and in 1986 to the Kamil (Hadith) level.

Former principal Maulana Muhammad Khalilur Rahman Nesarabad (the only son of Maulana Azizur Rahman Nesarabad) took charge in 1994. Under his leadership and with the cooperation of the governing body, teachers, and guardians, the madrasa underwent major infrastructural improvements and became one of the top Islamic and general education institutions in Bangladesh.

The madrasa was affiliated with Islamic University, Kushtia in 2006 for its Fazil and Kamil degrees and later transferred under the Islamic Arabic University, Dhaka in 2016.

== Academic programs ==
The Dakhil and Alim levels include both science and humanities streams. The Fazil level offers honors in two subjects, while the Kamil level includes departments of Hadith, Tafsir, Fiqh, and Adab. The madrasa also has residential facilities with subject-based instructors who supervise students, funded from the madrasa's own resources.

== Infrastructure ==
=== Nesarabad Darbar Sharif ===
Devotees, well-wishers, and common people used to visit Azizur Rahman Nesarabad seeking guidance, advice, or religious verdicts. To interact with them, he established the *Darbar Sharif* within the madrasa premises. He used to hold public discussions there. The Darbar Sharif still exists today and hosts gatherings where his life and teachings are discussed.

=== Nesarabad Mausoleum ===
Azizur Rahman Nesarabad was buried within the madrasa premises, and his tomb has now become a local attraction. Many visitors come here to pay their respects and pray for him and themselves.

== Facilities ==
The madrasa is equipped with modern facilities. It has a large playground, a mosque, and a library building. The most notable feature is the vast field where students play during leisure time. Its main gate is modeled after that of the Islamic University, Bangladesh in Kushtia.

=== Nesarabad Central Jame Mosque ===
Inside the madrasa stands a large five-story mosque for students' prayers. Residential students are required to perform all five daily prayers there. Thousands of worshippers from different parts of the country attend the weekly Friday congregation.

=== Library Complex ===
The madrasa has a large library open to students, containing books on Islamic history, Bangladeshi history, Islamic politics, economics, and more. Students can read books on-site or borrow them as needed.

== Co-curricular activities ==
The madrasa was founded by the spiritual leader of the Jhalokathi region, Azizur Rahman Nesarabad, who established a Darbar Sharif on the premises during his lifetime. He personally supervised the overall activities of the institution. Every year on February 22 and 23, the annual *Nesarabad Mahfil* is held, attended by hundreds of thousands of devout Muslims from across Bangladesh.

== Alumni ==
- Sharif Osman Bin Hadi (1993–2025), activist, writer and lecturer
