= Keshabpur Bahrul Ulum Kamil Madrasah =

Alia Madrasa Of Khulna Division

Coordinates: 22°54′18″N 89°13′02″E

Location
- Keshabpur Upazila, Altapol; Keshabpur, Khulna Division, 7450; Bangladesh

Information
- Type: Alia Madrasa
- Religious affiliation: Islam
- Established: 1955; 71 years ago
- Founder: Maulana Yusuf (RA.)
- School district: Jashore
- Principal: Mawlana Abdul Hai
- Grades: Dakhil, Alim, and Kamil
- Enrollment: 500
- Language: Arabic, Bangla, and English
- Campus type: Town
- Colors: Turquoise panjabi, white pajama, and a white prayer cap
- Slogan: হে প্রভু আমাকে জ্ঞান দাও
- Nickname: Keshabpur Alia Madrasah
- Affiliation: Bangladesh Madrasah Education Board
- Website: 115885.ebmeb.gov.bd

Keshabpur Bahrul Ulum Kamil Madrasah is a government-approved Alia madrasah located in Keshabpur Upazila of the Jashore District in Bangladesh. The institution provides education at the Dakhil, Alim, and Kamil levels and is known locally as one of the oldest Islamic educational institutions.

== History ==
The madrasah was established in 1955. Initially, it started as a Dakhil madrasah and was later gradually upgraded to the Alim and Kamil levels.

== Academics ==
Approved by the Bangladesh Madrasah Education Board, this madrasa teaches general academic subjects like Bangla, English, and math in addition to Islamic studies such as the Quran, Hadith, Fiqh, and Tafsir. To improve the standard of education, felicitation ceremonies for meritorious students and various cultural and religious events are organized every year.

== Administration ==
The madrasa is administered by a governing body, which includes local public representatives and representatives from the education board. The position of principal is currently held by Maulana Abdul Hai, who took charge in August 2024.

== Location ==
The madrasa is located in the Altapol area of Keshabpur Municipality, Jashore District.

== Achievement ==
During the National Education Week 2024, the madrasa was recognized as the best madrasa in Keshabpur Upazila, and its principal was selected as the Best Head of Institution. Furthermore, many students from the institution's Hifz department graduate each year, earning certification as a Hafiz (one who has memorized the Quran).
