= Satpur Kamil Madrasah =

Madrasa in Sylhet, Bangladesh

Satpur Kamil Madrashah
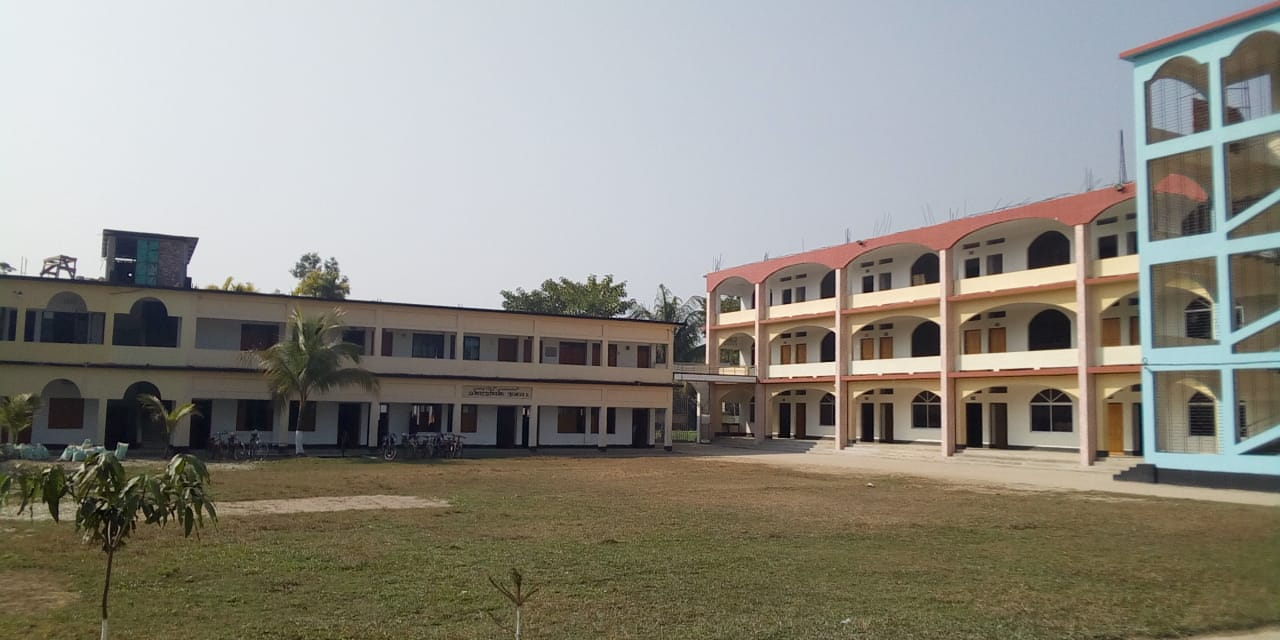

Location
- Satpur, Lamakazi Union, Bishwanath Upazila, Sylhet District; Bangladesh
- Coordinates: 24.9009°N 91.7250°E

Information
- Established: 1948
- Founder: Ghulam Hussain Satpuri
- School code: EIIN 130205
- Enrollment: 1500
- Language: Bangla, Arabic
- Campus size: 4.38 Acres
- Affiliation: Islamic Arabic University

Satpur Kamil Madrasah (Bengali: সৎপুর কামিল মাদ্রাসা, Arabic: المدرسة الكاملية ستفور) is an educational institution situated in Lamakazi at Bishwanath upazila, Sylhet. The madrasah is run under "Alia madrasah" curriculum up to kamil level (M.A. equivalent). In 2017, Honours course was started besides regular curriculum under the affiliation of “Islamic Arabic University“, Dhaka. Among the 4.38 acres of total registered land only 1.65 acres are used as main academic area of the madrasah with current number of students being over 1500. A reconstruction project of the age-old educational building starting in 2016, has recently come to an end.

== History ==
The madrasa was founded by a wali known as Ghulam Husayn Satpuri in his own home in 1948. Ghulam Husayn was a murid of Pir Hamidullah of Qaimganj. After Hamidullah's death, Husayn pledged bay'ah to Abdul Latif Chowdhury Fultali. The first conference was held after Husayn returned from Hajj, and had Hormuz Ullah Shayda as the guest of honour. The site of the madrasa was later changed to the local eidgah. The madrasah started as an Ebtedai (primary) level institution but gradually Dakhil, Alim, Fazil and Kamil levels were recognised by the Madrsah Board accordingly in 1958, 1960, 1962 & 1965. Under the affiliation of "Islamic Arabic university, Dhaka" Honors course in "Al hadis & Islamic studies " was started in 2017.

== See also ==
- Bangladesh Madrasah Education Board
- Education in Bangladesh
- Saheb Qiblah Fultali Rh.
