= Abdul Latif Chowdhury Fultali =

Bangladeshi Islamic scholar

Saheb Qiblah Abdul Latif Chowdhury Fultali
- আব্দুল লতিফ চৌধুরী ফুলতলী
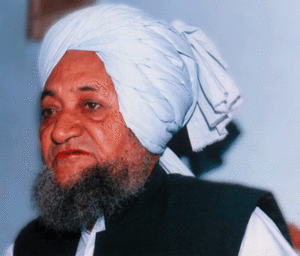

Personal life
- Born: Muhammad Abdul Latif Chowdhury; 25 May 1913 Zakiganj, Assam, British India
- Died: 15 January 2008 (aged 94) Sylhet, Bangladesh
- Resting place: Saheb Bari, Fultali, Zakiganj, Sylhet District
- Spouse: Khadijah Khatun bint Shaykh Muhammad Yaqub Badarpuri, Nihar-un-Nisa bint Abdul Rashid Khan
- Children: 7 sons and 3 daughters including Husam Uddin Chowdhury Fultali
- Notable work(s): Al-Qawlus Sadeed fil Qiraat wat-Tajweed, Muntakhab-us-Siyar, Nalaa-e-Qalandar
- Education: Fultali Alia Madrasa; Rangauti Alia Madrasa; Badarpur Senior Madrasa; Madrash-e-Alia Rampur; Matlaul Uloom Madrasa
- Known for: Ilm-ul-Qirat and Dawah
- Other names: ʿAllāmah; Shams-al-ʿUlamāʾ; Raʾees-al-Qurrāʾ; Quṭb-al-Awliyāʾ
- Relations: Hadhrat Shah Kamal Al-Yemeni (Great Great Grandfather), Hadhrat Shah A'la Bakhsh (Great Grand-Father), Mufti Muhammad Abdul Majid Chowdhury Naqshbandi Mujaddidi (Father), Shaykh Abu Yusuf Muhammad Yaqub Badarpuri (Father-in-law)

Religious life
- Religion: Islam
- Denomination: Sunni
- Jurisprudence: Hanafi
- Tariqa: Qadiri; Chishti (Nizami); Naqshbandi (Mujaddidi); Muhammadi
- Creed: Maturidi

Abdul Latif Chowdhury Fultali (Bengali: আব্দুল লতিফ চৌধুরী ফুলতলী; 25 May 1913 – 16 January 2008), reverentially known as Saheb Qiblah, was a late-twentieth-century Bangladeshi Islamic scholar, mufassir, qāriʾ, poet and orator. As a prolific author, he completed several works in Arabic, Bengali and Urdu including Muntakhab as-Siyār and Anwar as-Sālikīn. His books are part of syllabic studies under the Bangladesh Madrasah Education Board. Fultali was the leading figure of the Islamic Arabic University movement and the demand for fazil and kamil qualifications to be recognized as bachelor's and master's degrees. He is the founder of several influential organisations and institutions in Bangladesh and the United Kingdom such as Anjumane Al Islah, Hazrat Shahjalal Darussunnah Yaqubia Kamil Madrasa and Madrasah-e-Darul Qirat Majidiah.

He was the founder of Darul Hadis Latifiah In London, one of the oldest private Islamic institutes.

== Early life and background ==
Abdul Latif Chowdhury Fultali was born on 25 May 1913, to a noble Bengali Muslim Sufi Shah family in the village of Fultali in Badedeorail pargana, Sylhet district, Bengal Presidency (now in Zakiganj, Bangladesh). His paternal lineage joins to Hadhrat Shah Kamal Al-Yemeni, one of the companions of Shah Jalal, via Hadhrat Shah Muhammad A'la Bakhsh, a sage who contributed to Ahmad Sirhindi's opposition against the Din-i Ilahi of Mughal emperor Akbar. His father was Allamah Mufti Muhammad Abdul Majid Chowdhury Fultali Naqshbandi Mujaddidi, a Hanafi Jurist and Principal of Gangajal Hasania Senior Madrasa.

Allamah Fultali received his basic education from his own family. He was then taught by his distant cousin, Fatir Ali, at the Fultali Alia Madrasa, where he also studied the Qur'an with tajweed under Qari Sa'eed Ali. In 1336 AH (1918 CE), Allamah Fultali became a student at the Rangauti Madrasa in Hailakandi at the request of its principal, Abdur Rashid, who was a student of Fultali's father. After completing higher secondary examinations at Rangauti, Fultali enrolled into the Badarpur Senior Madrasa in Badarpur in 1338 AH (1920 CE), where he studied various Islamic sciences under his murshid Abu Yusuf Muhammad Yaqub Badarpuri. For higher education, Fultali then studied at the Rampur Alia Madrasah in Rampur State at the instruction of Badarpuri. He then enrolled in Matlaul Uloom Madrasah to specialise in Hadith studies under Khalillullah Rampuri and Wajihuddin Rampuri (student of Anwar Shah Kashmiri). He studied there for a few years and obtained first class, first position in the final Hadith exam in 1355 AH (1936 CE). He also attained degrees in tafsir and Islamic jurisprudence.

At the age of 18, Allamah Fultali received ijazah in qira'at and in the Qadiri, Chishti, Naqshbandi and Muhammadi Sufi orders from his spiritual master Mawlana Abu Yusuf Shah Muhammad Yaqub Badarpuri, who was a disciple of Hafiz Ahmad Jaunpuri. He also received an ijazah in Chishti Nizami sub-order from Mawlana Ghulam Mohiuddin Rampuri and an ijazah in Naqshbandi Mujaddidi sub-order from Mawlana Abu Yusuf Shah Muhammad Yaqub Badarpuri. Allamah Fultali received an ijazah in qira'at from his spiritual master Mawlana Abu Yusuf Shah Muhammad Yaqub Badarpuri Bundasili and also from Ustadh-ul-Qurrah Al-Hafiz Shaykh Abd-al-Rauf Karampuri Shahbazpuri. In 1363 AH (1944 CE), he travelled to Mecca where he received ijazah in qira'at from Grand Mufti Ahmad Abdullah Mahmud Al-Hijazi Al-Makki.

== Career ==
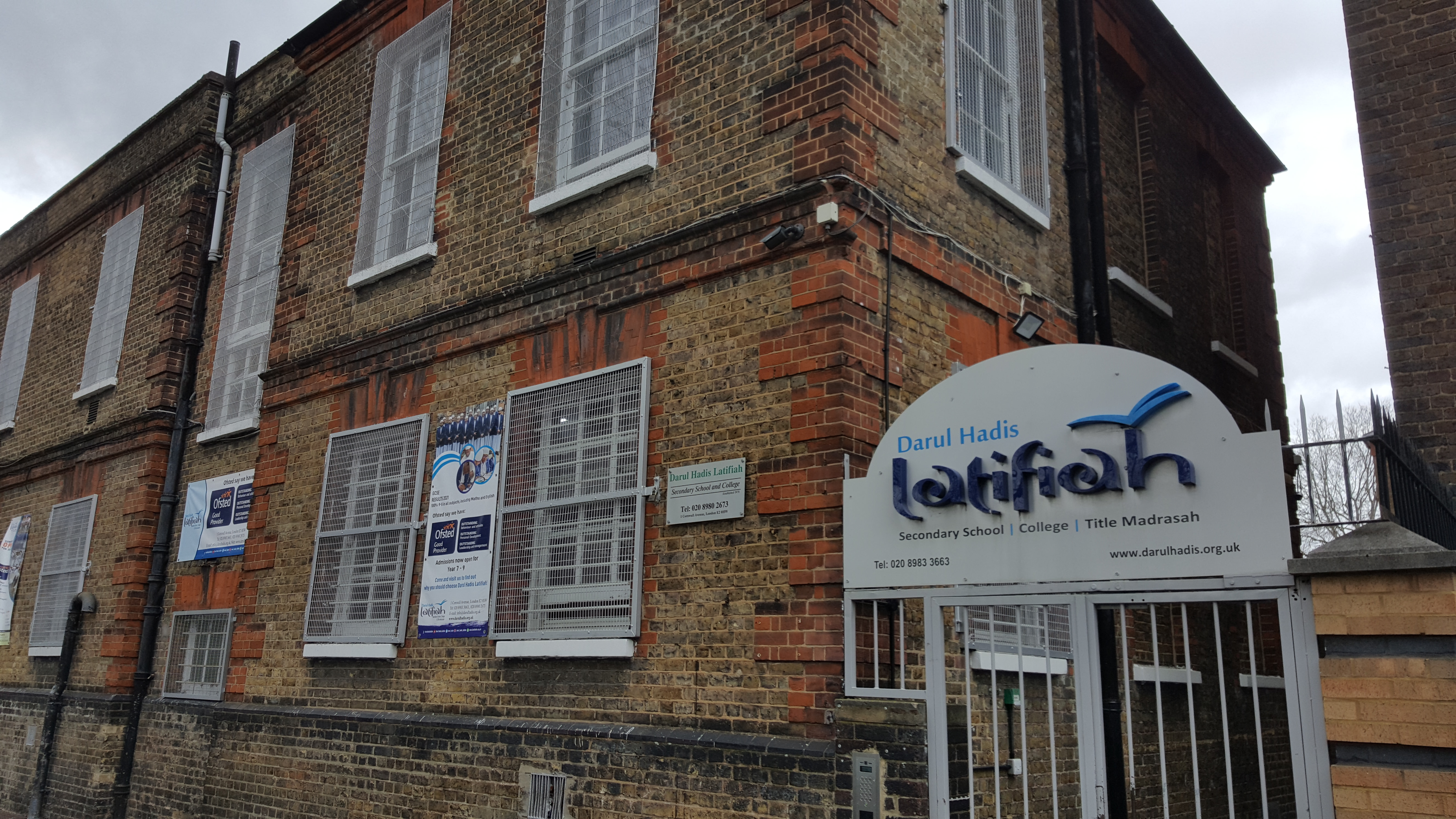
The Madrasah-e-Darul Qirat Majidiah (now Darul Hadis Latifiah) was "one of the very first Islamic educational institutions in London".

In 1940, Allamah Fultali founded the Darul Qirat Majidiah Trust and institutionalized his effort to teach the perfect recitation of the Quran. Now there are more than two thousand branches of the trust throughout the world engaged in educating people in the field of Tajweed.

Mawlana Abd-un-Noor (1880–1963) of Gorkapon in Badarpur was a prominent scholar and Sufi-Saint of that time, who requested Abdul Latif Chowdhury Fultali to visit the mosque conjoined to Adam Khaki's shrine. In 1946, Fultali announced that he would be travelling to Badarpur to give a lesson on qira'at at Adam Khaki's mosque. Abd-an-Nur Gorkaponi and his students purchased a horse for Allamah Fultali to ride on so the journey could be easier. From 1946 to 1950, Allamah Fultali was a teacher at the Badarpur Senior Madrasa. He began teaching Qur'an with tajweed from his own home in 1950. As a result of riots in the 1950s, Fultali briefly migrated to Pakistan. Fultali spent six years as a teacher of Hadith studies at the Gasbari Jamiul Uloom Kamil Madrasah. After that, he taught Sahih al-Bukhari, Sunan al-Nasa'i, Sunan ibn Majah, Sahih al-Tirmidhi, Sunan Abu Dawood, Al-Itqān, Nur al-Anwar, Al-Hidayah and Tafsir al-Jalalayn at the Satpur Alia Madrasa and Isamati Alia Madrasa respectively. He finally returned to Fultali Alia Madrasa, where he taught Hadith until his death.

On 11 May 1967, a conference was held at the Shah Jalal Dargah. A memorandum strictly calling for the prohibition of shirki practices was signed by the leading Islamic scholars from Sylhet including Abdul Latif Chowdhury Fultali, Hormuz Ullah Shayda, Mushahid Ahmad Bayampuri, Ibrahim Chatuli and Nur Uddin Gohorpuri.

During the Bangladesh Liberation War, on 30 July 1971, Fultali attended an anti-independence local peace committee meeting at the Sylhet Registry field, which was also attended by the likes of Ajmal Ali Chowdhury. In the meeting, Fultali urged the public to strictly follow Islamic tenets to protect Pakistan.

In post-independence Bangladesh, he was imprisoned in the Sylhet jail for around 2 years till 1973. During imprisonment, he authored the books At-Tanweer ala at-Tafsir, Muntakhabus Siar, and Nala-e-Qalandar.

Allamah Fultali was the best known and most influential spiritual leader among the British Bangladeshi community. He was based in Bangladesh, but made well-attended visits to the United Kingdom. Among these visits, he established Madrasah-e-Darul Qirat Majidiah in 1978, which has since vastly expanded in London. He was a founder of numerous organisations related to religion, culture and education and a patron to a number of humanitarian and charitable organisations such as Muslim Hands Bangladesh.

In 1983, he established the Hazrat Shahjalal Darussunnah Yaqubia Kamil Madrasa with the assistance of Haji Abdus Subhan Tafadar of Subhanighat, Sylhet.

== Personal life ==
Abdul Latif Chowdhury Fultali married Muhtarama Musammat Khadijah Khatun, daughter of his respected Shaykh and Mentor Abu Yusuf Shah Muhammad Yaqub Badarpuri Bundasili (Hatim Ali), in 1345 BS (1938 CE). He also married Muhtarama Nihar-un-Nisa, the daughter of Muhammad Abdur Rashid Khan of Fultali. He had seven sons and three daughters, they are: Muhammad Imad-ud-Din Chowdhury Fultali, Muhammad Najm-ud-Din Chowdhury Fultali, Mawlana Muhammad Shihab-ud-Din Chowdhury Fultali, Mawlana Mufti Muhammad Ghiyas-ud-Din Chowdhury Fultali, Mawlana Muhammad Qamar-ud-Din Chowdhury Fultali, Mawlana Hafiz Fakhr-ud-Din Chowdhury Fultali, and Mawlana Muhammad Husam Uddin Chowdhury Fultali, Karim-un-Nisa Chowdhury, Mahtab-un-Nisa Chowdhury and Aftab-un-Nisa Chowdhury

== Organisations ==
- Darul Qirat Majidiah Fultali Trust
- Anjumane Al Islah, Bangladesh
- Anjumane Al Islah (1978, branches in Bangladesh, United Kingdom, United States of America)
  - Anjuman-e-Talamiz-e-Islamia (1980, student branch)
  - Anjuman-e-Madaris-e-Arabia (1994, teachers branch)
  - Al Islah Youth Forum, United Kingdom
- Hazrat Shahjalal Darussunnah Yaqubia Kamil Madrasa, Sylhet (1983)
- Madrasah-e-Darul Qirat Majidiah, United Kingdom (1999)
  - Darul Hadis Latifiah Northwest
- Darul Qirat Majidiah, United Kingdom
- Latifiah Qurra Society (Bangladesh, United Kingdom, United States)
- Latifiah Orphanage, Bangladesh
- Ulama Society, United Kingdom
- Yaqubia Hifzul Quran Board (2006)
- Darul Hadith Latifia USA in Bangla Bazaar Jame Masjid, Bronx, New York

== Death and legacy ==
On 16 January 2008 at 2:10 am, Fultali died at his home in Subhanighat, Sylhet due to natural causes. His janazah (Islamic funeral) took place the day after his death following Asr prayer led by his eldest son. Reports in Bangladesh estimate that between 2 and 2.5 million attended his janazah. It is also estimated that further hundreds of thousands of people joined the janazah across the Indian border.

An isaal-e-sawab and mahfil (gathering) is held on the anniversary of Allamah Saheb Qiblah Fultali's death every year at his village in Balai Hawor, Fultali and many other places around the world by his students and followers. His grandson, Prof. Mawlana Ahmad Hasan Chowdhury Fultali (Assistant Professor of Arabic at Dhaka University) was the editor of one memorial book, Allamah Fultali Saheb Qiblah (Ra.) Smarak.

== Books ==
- Al-Qawl as-Sadeed fi al-Qir'at wa at-Tajweed, a comprehensive guide to the rule of correct Qur'anic recitation and an addition of the book by his teacher Al-Faqih Shaykh Ahmad Abdullah Mahmud Al-Hijazi Al-Makki. Composed originally in Urdu, it has been translated in Bengali by his son Murshid-e-Barhaq Allamah Muhammad Imad-ud-Din Chowdhury Fultali and into English by Syed Ajmal Husayn Wasi.
- At-Tanweer ala at-Tafsir, an in-depth elucidation of Surah Al-Baqarah.
- Muntakhab-us Siyar, an Urdu biography of the Islamic prophet Muhammad in three volumes. Translated into Bengali by his son, Mawlana Muhammad Husam-ud-Din Chowdhury Fultali.
- Anwar as-Salikeen, an Urdu work in the field of Tasawwuf, explaining the different stages of the path for the seeker, and elucidating on how to nurture oneself in preparation for the sacred path. Translated into Bengali by his son Murshid-e-Barhaq Allamah Muhammad Imad-ud-Din Chowdhury Fultali.
- Shajara-e-Tayyibah, the names of the spiritual masters of the Qadiri, Chishti, Naqshbandi and Muhammadi Sufi orders.
- Al-Khutbah al-Ya'qubiyyah, a compilation of khutbahs (sermons) in Arabic, including the khutbah for the two 'Eids (Islamic festivals) and the khutbah for Nikah (marriage). Named after his Respected Murshid and Father-in-law, Qutb-ul-Awliya Mawlana Abu Yusuf Shah Muhammad Yaqub Hatim Ali Badarpuri Bundasili (d. 1958 CE).
- Nala-e-Qalandar, an Urdu compilation of ode in veneration of Muhammad and the Awliya.
- Nek A'mal, a work in Bengali, elucidating on good actions and the rewards gained for action upon them.

== See also ==
- Brick Lane Mosque
- Al-Islah Mosque
