= Al-Hera Jamea Islamia Fazil (Degree) Madrasah =

- আলহেরা জামেয়া ইসলামিয়া ফাজিল (ডিগ্রি) মাদরাসা

Location
- Maijbari, Kurban Nagar, Sunamganj Sadar, Sunamganj; Bangladesh; 25.074665°N 91.428337°E

Information
- Former name: Maijbari Islamia Madrasah
- Type: MPO-listed Fazil Madrasah
- Established: 1 January 1966
- Founder: Maulana Md. Abdul Matin (Shaykh-e-Phulbari)
- School code: 19664 (Madrasah Code); MPO Code: 1410052101
- Chairperson: Muhammad Shams Uddin
- Principal: Md. Abul Kalam Azad
- Language: Bengali, Arabic
- Campus: Rural
- Affiliation: Islamic Arabic University; Bangladesh Madrasah Education Board
- Website: Official Website

Al-Hera Jamea Islamia Fazil (Degree) Madrasah (Bengali: আলহেরা জামেয়া ইসলামিয়া ফাজিল (ডিগ্রি) মাদরাসা) is an Islamic educational institution located in the Sunamganj Sadar Upazila of Sunamganj District, Bangladesh. Established in 1966, the madrasah offers both secondary and tertiary Islamic education. It is affiliated with the Islamic Arabic University for its degree programs and the Bangladesh Madrasah Education Board for its secondary levels.

== History ==
The institution was founded on 1 January 1966 with the aim of providing Islamic and general education in the haor regions of Sunamganj. It was established by Maulana Md. Abdul Matin, a local Islamic scholar. Initially, the institution was named Maijbari Islamia Madrasah.

Due to financial difficulties in its early years, the management of the madrasah was transferred to an organization called "Sunamganj Islami Sangstha" in 1992. Following this structural change, it was renamed Al-Hera Jamea Islamia.

=== Academic progression ===
- 1985: Approved for the Ebtedayi (Primary) level by the Bangladesh Madrasah Education Board.
- 2002: Included in the government's Monthly Pay Order (MPO) scheme for the Dakhil (Secondary) level. (Note: The Monthly Pay Order (MPO) is a Bangladeshi government scheme where the state pays the basic salaries of teachers and employees in non-government educational institutions.)
- 2010: Received academic recognition for the Alim (Higher Secondary) level, with MPO enlistment following in 2019.
- 2017: Upgraded to the Fazil level, enabling it to offer undergraduate programs. (Note: In the Bangladesh madrasah education system, 'Fazil' is a three-year undergraduate degree program recognized as equivalent to a Bachelor of Arts (B.A.) degree.) Formal teaching permission was granted by the Islamic Arabic University in 2021.

== Location ==
The madrasah is situated in the village of Maijbari, under the Kurban Nagar Union of Sunamganj Sadar. It is located near the Sunamganj-Doarabazar highway, providing transport access for students from surrounding areas.

== Academic programs ==
The madrasah curriculum combines traditional Islamic theology with standard national education. The levels of study include:

- Ebtedayi: Primary education.
- Dakhil: Equivalent to the Secondary School Certificate (SSC), offering General and Science streams.
- Alim: Equivalent to the Higher Secondary Certificate (HSC).
- Fazil: A three-year undergraduate degree affiliated with the Islamic Arabic University.

The campus includes a science laboratory, a computer lab for ICT training, and a central mosque. In 2022, the institution introduced specialized Hifz (Quran memorization) and Noorani departments for foundational religious studies.

== See also ==
- Education in Bangladesh
- List of educational institutions in Sylhet
