= Fazil examination =

The Fazil examination is a government examination held in Aliya Madrasas in Bangladesh and India. The Fazil exam is an examination equivalent to a degree, sometimes equivalent to a bachelor's degree, in Bangladesh, which is held in a Fazil Madrasa. However, in India, the Fazil exam is considered the standard of the higher secondary level (11th or 12th class). The Fazil exam is common in government-recognized Aliya Madrasas in Bangladesh, India, and Pakistan. The Fazil exam in Bangladesh is held under the Islamic Arabic University and the Fazil exam in India is held under the West Bengal Board of Madrasah Education.

== History ==
Before the transfer of Dhaka Aliya Madrasa to Dhaka in 1947, the Fazil examination of Bangladesh and India was held under the Calcutta Aliya Madrasa. The Fazil examination is currently held under the Islamic Arabic University. It was previously held under the Madrasa Board and the Islamic University. When Madrasa-e-Alia was transferred to Dhaka in 1948, the Fazil examinations of the Madrasa Board were accepted by the Dhaka University. On the recommendation of the Qudrat-e-Khuda Education Commission in 1975, the national curriculum and multi-faceted curriculum were introduced in the Aliya Madrasas controlled by the Madrasa Board. This curriculum was implemented in the Fazil examination held in 1980. According to this education commission, the Fazil examination was declared equivalent to the general higher secondary H.S.C. by including Islamic education in the Fazil category along with the general curriculum.

In 1978, the Senior Madrasa Education System Committee was formed under the leadership of Professor Mustafa Bin Kasim. Under the guidance of this committee, the level of Alia Madrasa education controlled by the Bangladesh Madrasa Board was aligned with the general education level in 1984. The Fazil level was upgraded to a 2-year course, introducing a complete modern education system of Alia Madrasa lasting a total of 16 years. It was through this commission that the government declared the Fazil examination as the general degree standard.

== University affiliation ==
Until 2006, all the examinations of all Aliya Madrasas in Bangladesh were controlled by the Bangladesh Madrasa Education Board. According to the Islamic Universities Amendment Act, 2006, the Fazil (Bachelor's Degree) courses of Aliya Madrasas were planned to be of 2 to 3 years duration. 1,086 Fazil Madrasas (Bachelor's Degree) in Bangladesh were affiliated to the Islamic University of Kushtia. And in some cases, both the Fazil and Kamil examinations are considered equivalent to a full bachelor's degree in general education, in some cases only the Fazil examination is considered equivalent to a bachelor's degree. Islamic University, Kushtia In 2010, a bachelor's degree equivalent course was introduced in 31 notable madrasas in Bangladesh. As a result, students from these 31 madrasas had the opportunity to earn a full bachelor's degree by completing only the bachelor's degree. At that time, the bachelor's degree course was still running in these madrasas.

Then, in 2016, the Islamic Arabic University was established to further modernize madrasa education. And then the Alia madrasas were moved there. In 2016, the Islamic Arabic University introduced undergraduate and postgraduate degrees in 21 more madrasas.
