= Osman Hadi =

Bangladeshi politician and activist (1993–2025)

- ওসমান হাদি
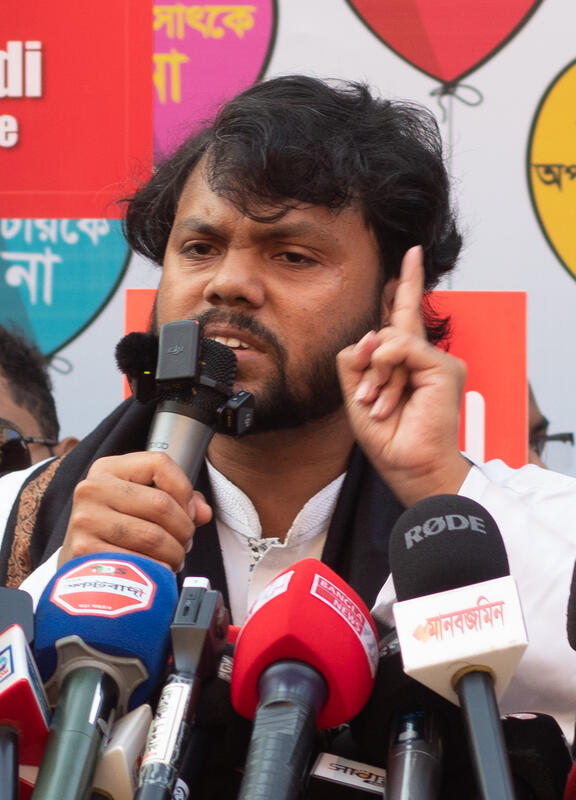
- Hadi speaking in 2025.

Spokesperson of the Inqilab Moncho
- In office 13 August 2024 – 18 December 2025
- Member Secretary: Abdullah Al Jaber
- Preceded by: Office established
- Succeeded by: TBD

Personal details
- Born: Osman Goni; 1 January 1993 Nalchity, Jhalakathi District, Bangladesh
- Died: 18 December 2025 (aged 32) Bukit Merah, Singapore
- Cause of death: Assassination by gunshot
- Resting place: Mausoleum of Kazi Nazrul Islam, Dhaka, Bangladesh; 23.7351422°N 90.3947337°E
- Party: Independent
- Alma mater: Nesarabad Kamil Madrasa; University of Dhaka
- Occupation: Writer; Politician; Activist; Teacher
- Known for: Inqilab Moncho; July Uprising

Sharif Osman Bin Hadi (Note: Bengali: শরিফ ওসমান বিন হাদি) (born Osman Goni; (Note: Bengali: ওসমান গনি) 1 January 1993 – 18 December 2025) was a Bangladeshi political and cultural activist, writer and a teacher. (Note: Multiple references:) He was the co-founder and spokesperson of Inqilab Moncho. After the July Uprising, he became a prominent figure in youth-led movements, noted for his opposition to what he termed "Indian hegemony in Bangladesh", his advocacy regarding the July martyrs, and his participation in the Awami League ban protests. (Note: Multiple references:)

On 12 December 2025, Hadi was shot in the Paltan area of Dhaka. He was airlifted to the Singapore General Hospital on 15 December, where he died three days later. (Note: Multiple references:) His assassination sent shockwaves throughout Bangladesh, leading to widespread national mourning and cementing his legacy as a martyr among the youth and activist communities. The intense public grief over his murder also sparked significant nationwide unrest, underscoring his profound impact and popularity across the country. (Note: Multiple references :)

== Early life ==
Sharif Osman Bin Hadi was born on January 1, 1993 in Nalchity Upazila, Jhalokathi District to Maulana Abdul Hadi and Taslima Hadi. His father was a madrasa teacher and a local imam. The youngest of six siblings, he grew up in a religious environment.

== Education ==
Hadi completed his higher secondary education at Jhalakati N S Kamil Madrasa, passing the Alim examination before enrolling in the Department of Political Science at the University of Dhaka for the 2010–2011 academic session.

== Career ==
Hadi worked as a lecturer in the Department of Business Studies at the University of Scholars, a private university in Dhaka.

== Activism ==
=== July Uprising ===
During the July Uprising, Hadi was a resident of Rampura in Dhaka. He participated in local organizational activities and was a coordinator for the Rampura area.

=== Inqilab Moncho ===
Hadi co-founded the Inqilab Moncho (Bengali: ইনকিলাব মঞ্চ, lit. 'Platform for Revolution') is a political platform and a student group inspired by July Uprising. He served as the founding spokesman. The organization aimed to oppose all forms of domination and establish a justice-based state that protects freedom and sovereignty. Democratic participation, justice, and political accountability were presented as the central principles underpinning the platform.

Inqilab Moncho under Hadi's leadership joined a broader network of youth platforms and alliances calling for accountability for protest-related killings and for a ban on the Awami League. Several reports have identified Inqilab Moncho as part of the "July Unity coalition", a grouping of youth and civil society platforms formed in the aftermath of the July protests. The organization in Bangladesh was outspoken critic of neighboring country India.

Hadi was an active participant in the July Uprising and after the protests, he emerged as one of the visible young organisers demanding accountability for protest-related deaths. He accused certain opposition groups of attempting to dominate the movement and criticised what he characterised as corruption among some youth political leaders.

=== Awami League ban protests ===
Hadi and Inqilab Moncho repeatedly called for the Awami League to be banned "constitutionally" from politics, arguing that the party had been responsible for repression and protest-related killings. At a "martyrs' assembly" in Shahbagh, he urged political parties to include the trial and banning of the Awami League in their election manifestos and announced plans for a "March for Bangladesh" towards the Bangladesh Secretariat if their demands were not met within 100 days.

For the past 14–15 years, fascism has been established in Bangladesh. Thousands of Aynaghars have been set up under the slogan "We don't want justice, we want execution". My sister was raped after being forced to break her fast. In Bangladesh, Begum Khaleda Zia was left untreated, causing her hand to be crippled. Allama Sayedee was brought to the hospital under the guise of medical treatment and was killed. Mushtaq was murdered in prison. An attempt was made to end the life of Michael Chakma. Most recently, our brothers and sisters were shot at from helicopters, their hearts torn apart. This Shahbagh has not only legitimized but also proved the necessity of that term.

— Osman Hadi

In other statements he framed himself and his organisation as being uncompromising opponents of "fascism" and argued that July protesters should not allow the ruling party to regain political legitimacy. In clashes during the National Citizen Party's March to Gopalganj campaign, Hadi used profanities criticising the situation and called for the dissolution of Gopalganj District. Later, amid criticism, he said that his outburst was an 'epic of liberation' and expressed his regret to anyone who may have been offended.

=== Call for a National government ===
On 24 May 2025, Inqilab Moncho held a press conference at the University of Dhaka, where Hadi called for a "National government" inclusive of all anti–Awami League forces, explicitly naming the Bangladesh Nationalist Party, Bangladesh Jamaat-e-Islami, Islami Andolan Bangladesh and others. At a human chain in front of the Bangladesh National Museum in Shahbagh earlier, Hadi announced a continuous sit-in programme with five demands, including the arrest of activist Lucky Akter, investigations into past killings and a ban on the Awami League.

=== Positions on other political parties ===
Hadi commented on wider opposition politics. In a televised discussion he said that "politics is essentially about bargaining" in the context of reported talks between the National Citizen Party and Gono Odhikar Parishad on a possible merger. Hadi publicly criticised other opposition platforms including the National Citizen Party, alleging that they have tried to "monopolise" the July uprising and that some leaders have become corrupt. At a press conference held at the Madhur Canteen of the University of Dhaka in July 2025, Hadi stated that if the Bangladesh Nationalist Party returned to power while continuing what he described as 'old-style' politics, the party would not remain in office for even two years.

=== Public statements and media coverage ===
Hadi frequently uses social media and public speeches to comment on political developments. In July 2025, he demanded the arrest of activist Lucky Akter and called for investigations into alleged massacres. He addressed issues such as alleged "disinformation" about disappeared bodies, arguing that certain campaigns constitute a conspiracy against the state and that mass killings cannot easily be concealed in contemporary Bangladesh.

=== Influence on anti-Indian hegemony ===
Hadi's influence on the discourse of anti-Indian influence in Bangladesh was primarily channeled through his role as the spokesperson of Inqilab Moncho after the 2024 July Revolution. Hadi framed the struggle for democracy in Bangladesh as being intrinsically linked to the removal of perceived external dominance, specifically from India, which he characterized as "Indian hegemony". He argued that the political stability of the previous Awami League administration had been maintained through the strategic support of New Delhi, and he advocated for a "generational rupture" from these established power dynamics.

Under Hadi's leadership, Inqilab Moncho campaigned for the formal banning of the Awami League and demanded the restructuring of bilateral treaties with India to ensure what he termed "justice-based sovereignty" (Insaf). His activism often utilized nationalist and religious motifs to call for total independence from Indian diplomatic and security influence. Hadi gained significant international attention after reportedly releasing a map depicting a "Greater Bangladesh" that included Indian territories in the Northeast and West Bengal, a move that drew sharp criticism from Indian officials while solidifying his status as a radical critic of regional geopolitics in reports of Indian media outlets. After being assassinated in December 2025, his work has become a focal point for renewed anti-India sentiment. Supporters viewed him as being a "martyr of sovereignty", leading to widespread protests and diplomatic tensions between Dhaka and New Delhi.

== Political career ==
In preparation for the 2026 Bangladeshi general election, Hadi announced his candidacy for the Dhaka-8 constituency as an independent politician. He engaged in local campaigning including "consultation meetings" in many neighborhoods. During a campaign, he organized a "van rally" in central Dhaka criticizing incumbent MPs and he pledged to expose corruption if elected.

== Assassination ==
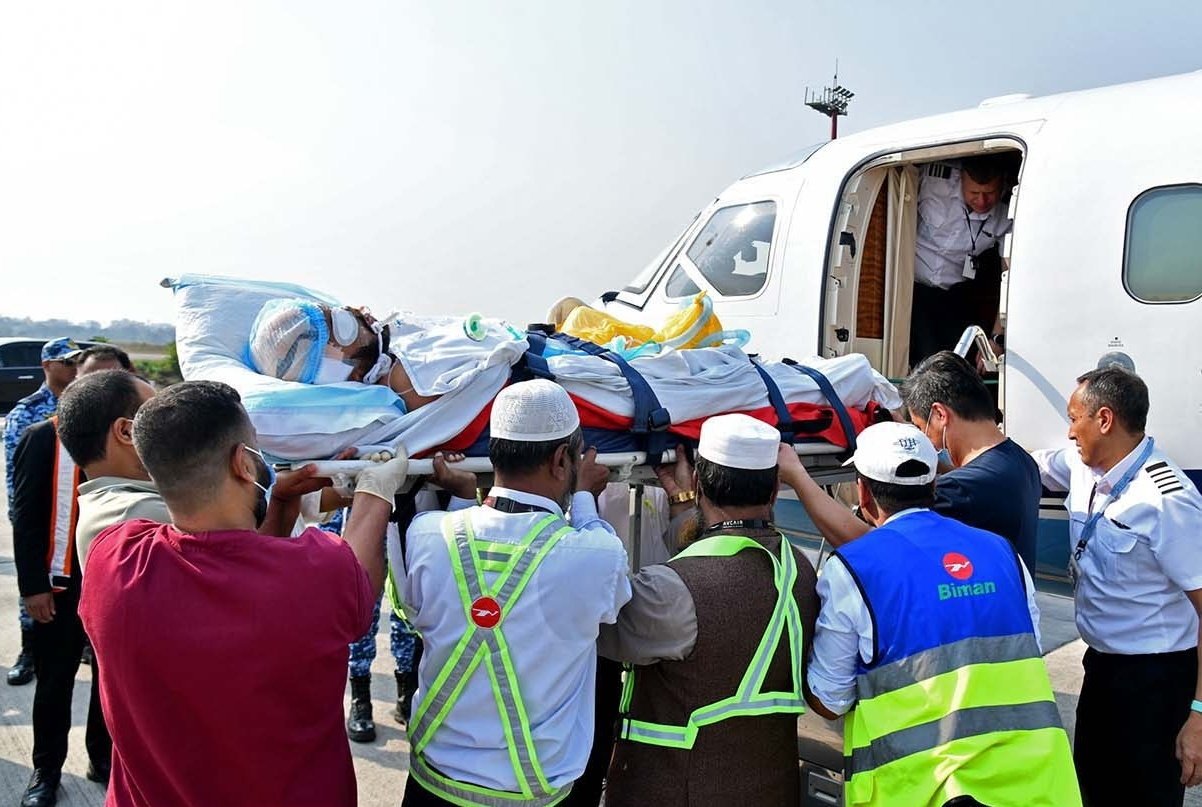
Hadi being transported to Singapore via air ambulance at Hazrat Shahjalal International Airport, Dhaka

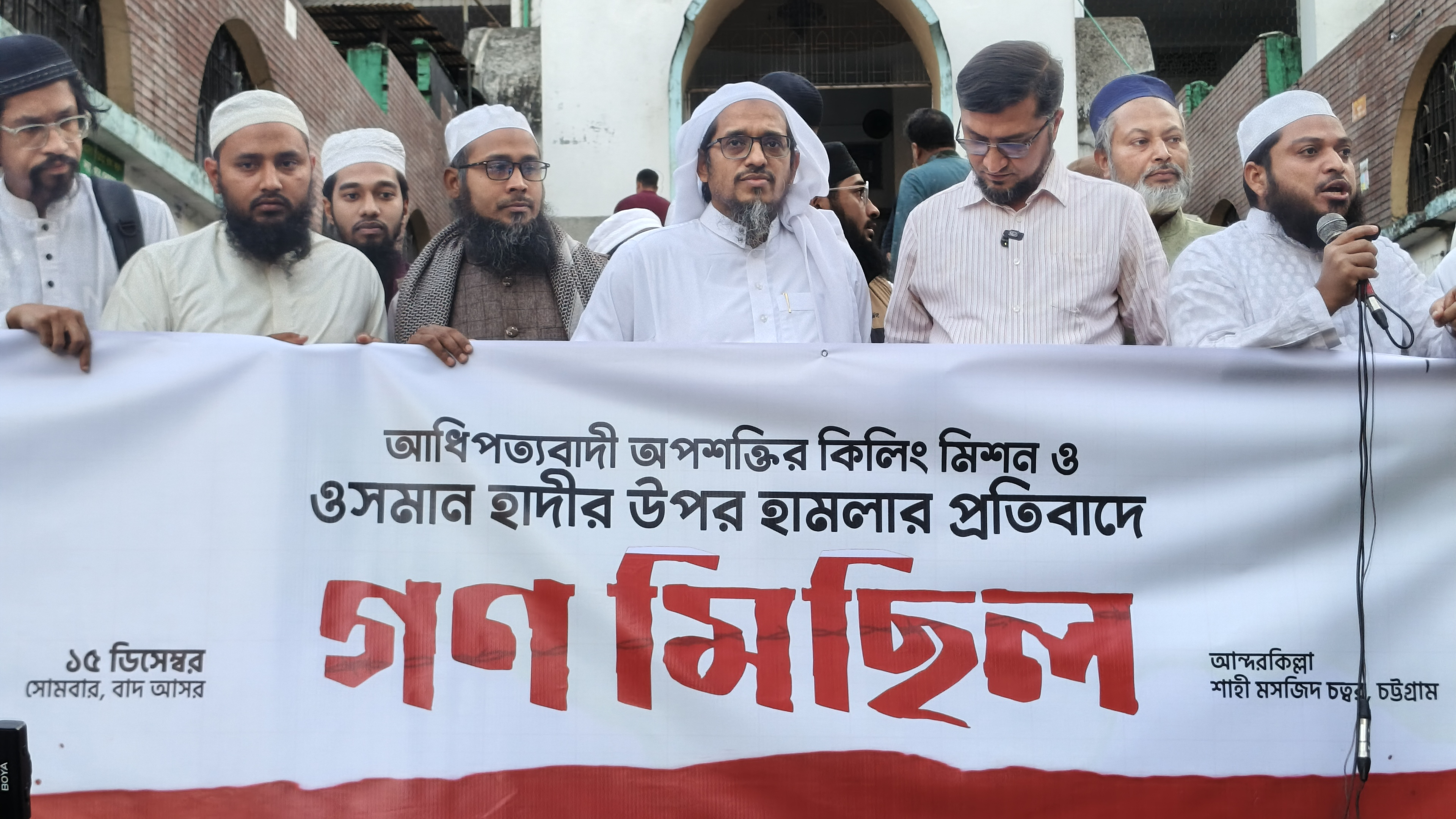
Harun Izhar leads the protest in Andarkilla following the assassination attempt on Hadi

On 12 December 2025, at approximately 2:25 p.m. (BST), Hadi was shot in the head in the Paltan precinct of Dhaka after leaving a mosque. The Dhaka Metropolitan Police reported the attack was conducted by assailants on a motorcycle. Hadi had previously reported receiving death threats.

Hadi was initially treated at Dhaka Medical College Hospital and later transferred to Evercare Hospital Dhaka. On 15 December, he was airlifted to Singapore, to be treated at Singapore General Hospital, where he died on 18 December.

=== Investigation ===
Police identified suspects as Faisal Karim Masud and Alamgir Sheikh, describing them as active members of the Awami League. The Ministry of Home Affairs offered a reward for information. Several arrests were made in connection with the case. On 8 March 2026, Faisal Karim Masud (also known as Daud Khan) and Alamgir Hossain, who were allegedly involved in the plot to assassinate Hadi, were detained by the Special Task Force of the West Bengal Police from a village in West Bengal, near the Bangladesh-India border.

=== Aftermath ===
A day of state mourning was declared by the Government of Bangladesh after his passing. Following the announcement of Hadi's death, unrest broke out in Dhaka. This included attacks on the headquarters of Prothom Alo and The Daily Star, where staff were briefly trapped by arson. The Chhayanaut Sangskriti Bhaban and the remains of the Bangabandhu Memorial Museum were also vandalized.

The violence included anti-Indian sentiment; the National Citizen Party (NCP) demanded the closure of the Indian High Commission. Protests in Chittagong and Rajshahi targeted Indian diplomatic missions, leading Indian authorities to temporarily close visa centers in Rajshahi and Khulna.

On 22 December, Inqilab Moncho warned it would oust the interim government over alleged inaction. Hadi's brother, Omar Hadi, claimed that the authorities were attempting to use the murder to "sabotage" the election, asserting that such efforts would not succeed. He stated that "the interim government cannot avoid responsibility."

On 21 January 2026, the interim government announced plan to provide a total of Tk 20 million to Hadi’s family. Of this amount, Tk 10 million will be allocated by the Ministry of Finance for the purchase of a flat, while the remaining Tk 10 million will be provided from the Chief Adviser’s fund to support the family’s livelihood.

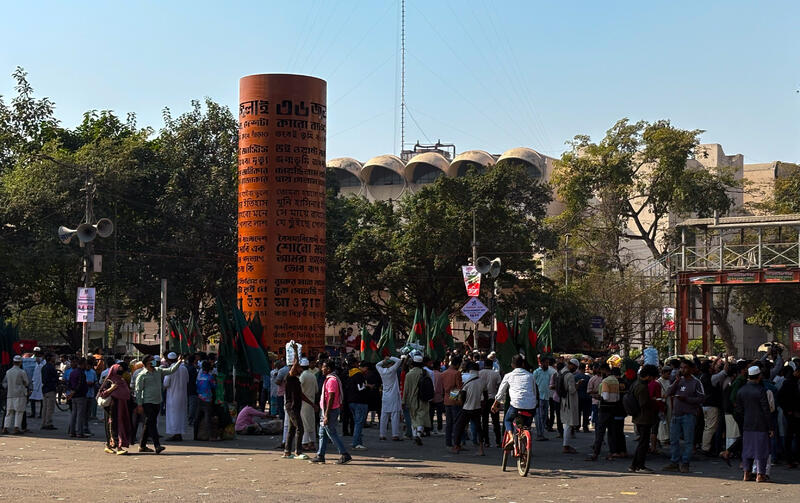
Supporters of Hadi protesting his death in Shahbag, Dhaka

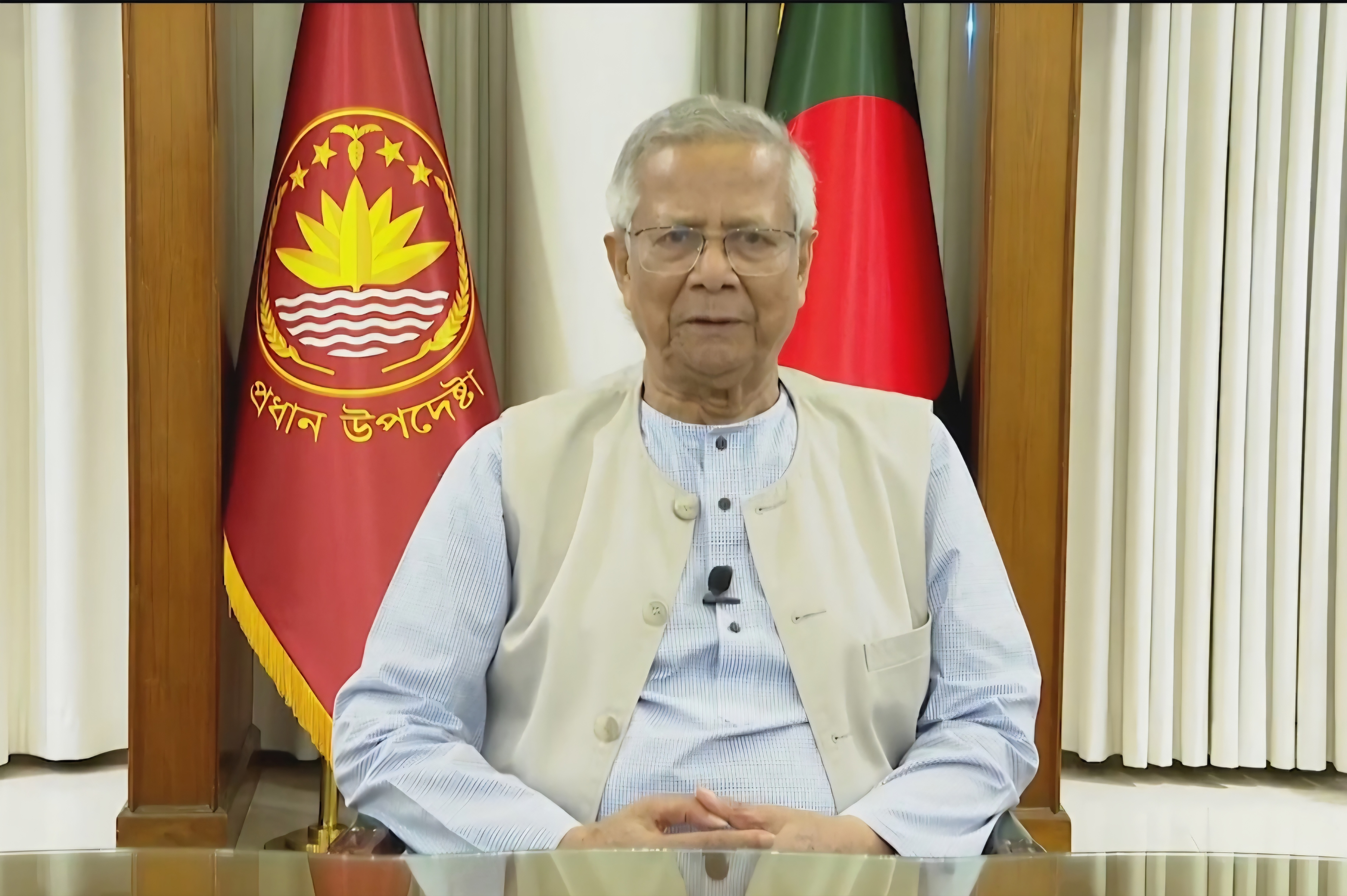
Chief Adviser Muhammad Yunus addressing the nation following the death of Hadi

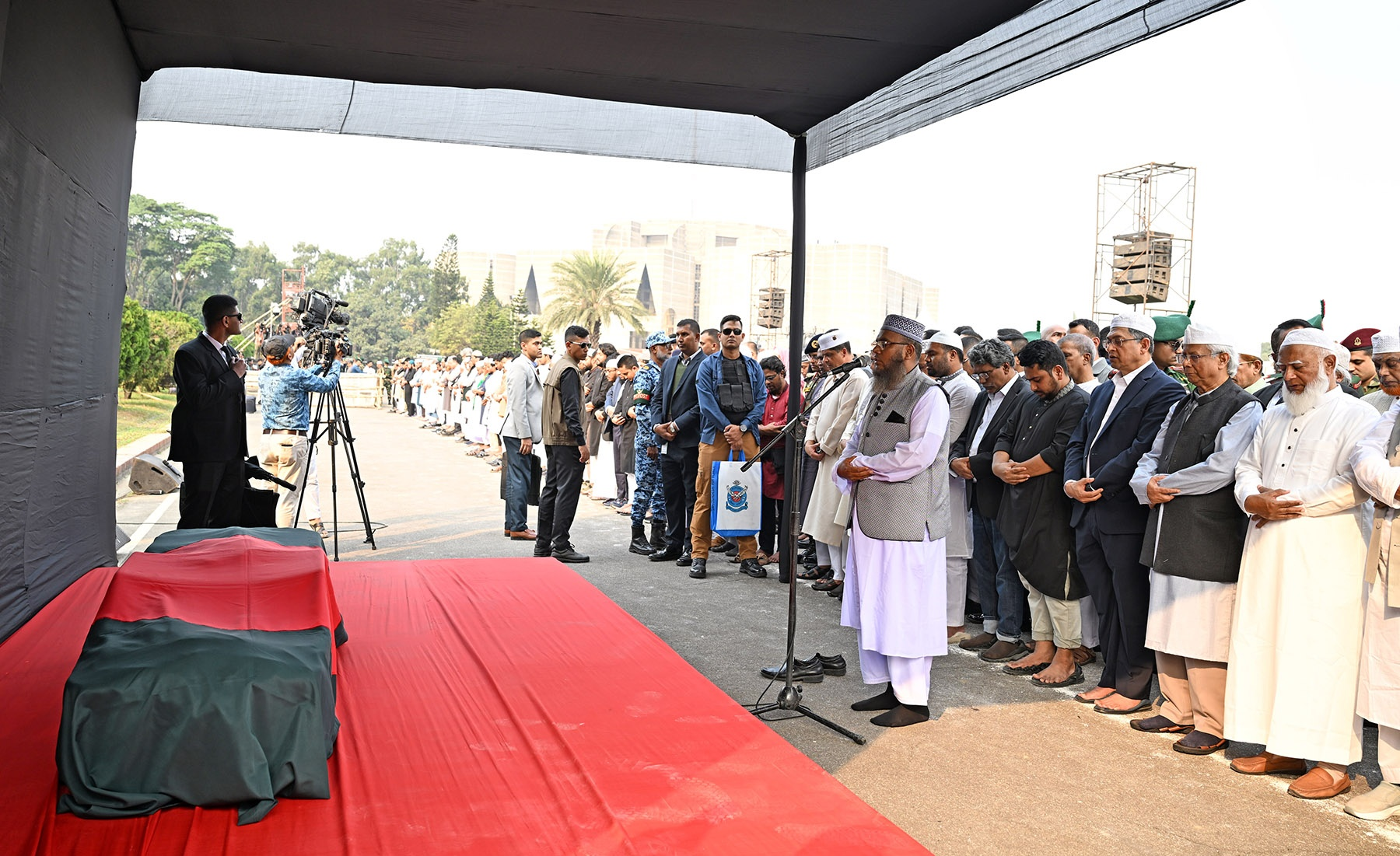
Funeral prayer of Hadi at Jatiya Sangsad Bhaban

=== Reactions ===
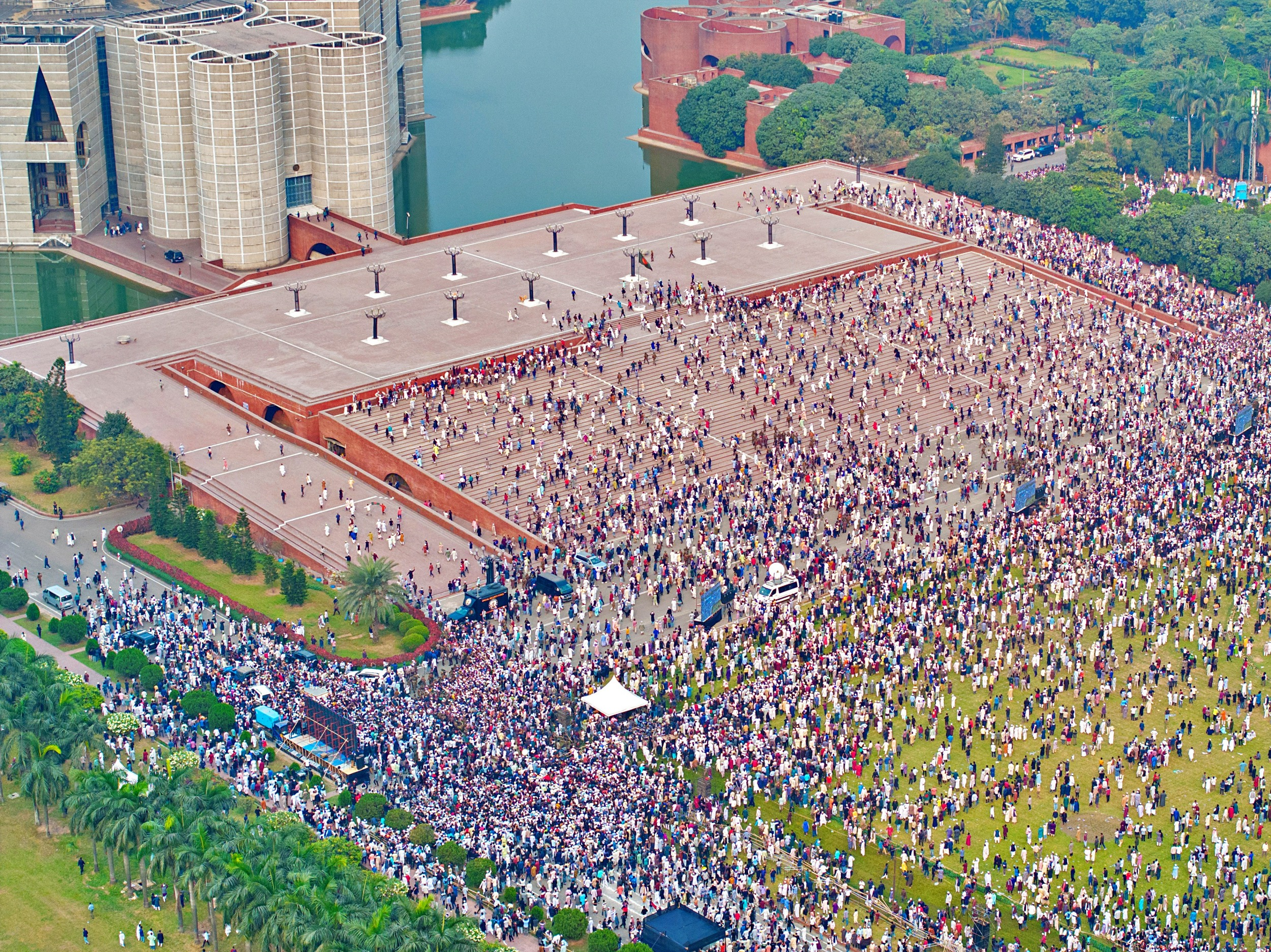
People at the funeral of Hadi at Jatiya Sangsad Bhaban

On 19 December, the European Union and the United States Embassy in Dhaka issued a statement via social media expressing its condolences following the death of Hadi. Pakistan's High Commission Bangladesh also released a statement expressing sorrow and extending condolences on Hadi's death. United Nations Secretary General António Guterres strongly condemned Hadi's assassination and extended condolences to his family, while UN High Commissioner for Human Rights Volker Türk urged calm and called for proper investigations into the killing. The United Nations Human Rights Office expressed concern and called for an impartial investigation.

His funeral prayer was held at the South Plaza of Jatiya Sangsad Bhaban, which was attended by tens of thousands of people. Hundreds of Bangladeshis in Singapore gathered outside Angullia Mosque after at least three Bangladeshi news sites claimed that funeral prayers would be held at the mosque. Both the Bangladeshi High Commission in Singapore and the mosque later issued separate statements on social media to clarify that no such arrangements were made due to "a lack of clearance" and "inaccurate".

Hadi was laid to rest on 20 December, following a Funeral prayer held at the South Plaza of the National Parliament. He was buried at the Mausoleum of Kazi Nazrul Islam, near Dhaka University Central Mosque.

== Controversy ==
After clashes during the National Citizen Party's March to Gopalganj campaign on 16 July 2025, Hadi sharply criticized the situation using profanity, and called for the dissolution of Gopalganj District, which generated widespread controversy and debate among many supporters of the former Awami League government. Later, amid criticism, he described his outburst as an 'epic of liberation' and expressed regret to anyone who may have been offended.

== Works ==
- Sharif, Shimanto (February 2024). লাভায় লালশাক পূবের আকাশ [The Eastern Sky Turned Red Amaranth by Lava] (in Bengali). Dhaka, Bangladesh: Duar Publications.

== See also ==
- Indian influence in Bangladesh
