= Pabna Islamia Madrasah =

Madrasah in Pabna, Bangladesh

Coordinates: 24.0109°N 89.2594°E

- Motto: Allah, increase the light of my knowledge (Bengali: প্রভু আমার জ্ঞানের আলো বাড়িয়ে দাও, Arabic: ربِّ زدنی علماً)
- Established: 1991
- Founders: Darul Aman Trust, Pabna
- Principal: Maulana Iqbal Hussain
- Location: Pabna, 6600, Bangladesh
- Language: Bangla, Arabic, English.
- Website: pim.edu.bd

Pabna Islamia Madrasah, officially Pabna Islamia Fazil Madrasah, is an Islamic religious higher education institution and Alia Madrasah located in Pabna district of Bangladesh. However, the madrasa is better known as its parent institution Darul Aman Trust. In the 2011 entrance examination, the institution was ranked second in the country and ninth in 2014. Maulana Iqbal Hussain is currently the principal of the madrasa.

== History ==
The madrasah was established 16 January 1991, after Alhaj Ashir Uddin Sardar donated 7 and a half bighas of land in Laskarpur Mouza north of Pabna Bus Terminal to the Darul Aman Trust for conducting social activities. Within less than 3 months, a religious educational institution called 'Pabna Islamia Madrasa' was started on that land on the initiative of Darul Aman Trust. Maulana Abdur Rahim was the acting superintendent of the madrasa at the time of its establishment. Later Maulana Abdur Rab was given the responsibility of superintendent of madrasah. Gradually the madrasa was introduced from Ebtedayi and then promoted to Alim level. On the basis of the results obtained in the Dakhil and Alim examinations in 2019, the students of this institution have received the 'Merit and General Scholarship' given by the Bangladesh Madrasa Education Board. In 2020 the central library was established in this madrasa. Maulana Iqbal Hussain is currently the principal of the madrasa.
