= Badedeorail Fultali Kamil Madrasa =

Educational institution in Zakiganj, Bangladesh

- Motto: اقرأ باسم ربك الذي خلق
- Motto in English: Read, in the Name of your Lord who created
- Type: MPO
- Established: 1 January 1920; 106 years ago
- Founder: Fatir Ali
- Academic affiliations: Islamic University, Bangladesh (2006-2016); Islamic Arabic University (from 2016)
- Principal: Muhammad Abdur Rahim
- Board: Bangladesh Madrasah Education Board
- Students: c. 900
- Location: Badedeorail, Zakiganj Upazila, Sylhet District, Bangladesh
- Campus: Rural
- EIIN No.: 130525
- Website: 130525.ebmeb.gov.bd

Badedeorail Fultali Kamil Madrasa (Bengali: বাদেদেওরাইল ফুলতলী কামিল মাদ্রাসা, Arabic: المدرسة العالية ببعض ديورائل فولتلي للكامل) is an Islamic educational institution located in Zakiganj, Sylhet District, Bangladesh. The madrasa was founded in 1920, and is now affiliated with the Islamic Arabic University for degree and honours programmes.

== Location ==
The madrasa is located in the northeasternmost upazila of Bangladesh, Zakiganj, in the village of Badedewrail.

== History ==
The Badedewrail Madrasa was established by Mawlana Fatir Ali who was a descendant of Shah Ala Bakhsh, a notable Bengali Muslim scholar from the Mughal period. Initially, Ali was responsible for the teaching programmes at Badedewrail Mosque, and eventually the project expanded with the building of a separate madrasa. Its establishment was dependent upon the land donations of Asaddar Ali Chowdhury, Ajab Ali Chowdhury, Aqaddas Ali Chowdhury, Sakhayat Ali Chowdhury, Ghiyathuddin Chowdhury and Khurshid Ali Chowdhury. Later on, the madrasa campus was extended through the land donation of Abdul Latif Chowdhury Fultali, who also put much effort into the development of the madrasa.

After Fatir Ali's death, the next principal was Muqaddas Ali Chowdhury of Mansurpur. He was succeeded by Tayyabur Rahman Chowdhury of Balaut, who dedicated his life to the madrasa. In his term, the number of students increased to a great number. On the request of the locals, the next muhtamim was Fatir Ali's paternal uncle Shah Abdul Majid Chowdhury. The latter employed Master Sayyid Ali Chowdhury Mansurpuri, Qari Sayyid Ali Palashpuri and Habibullah Bhadeshwari as teachers at the madrasa. Abdul Majid was succeeded by Muhammad Abdul Wahid Chowdhury, who served a long term.

Although the establishment of the madrasa gained much repute, a while later its progress was disrupted and it likely closed down. After the Partition of India, Abdul Latif Chowdhury returned from Badarpur, Assam back to his home village of Fultali, Zakiganj. Through his efforts and patronship, a new stage of the madrasa's history began. Fultali undertook the role of muhtamim (president) around 1950. In 1959, the madrasa achieved Dakhil (secondary) status from the East Pakistan Madrasah Education Board. In 1975, the madrasa was destroyed by the Kalboishakhi storms. Effectively, Fultali re-established the madrasa. He was succeeded by his second son, Shaykh-ul-Hadith Allamah Muhammad Najm-ud-Din Chowdhury Fultali, after his death.

In 2021, the madrasa organised a centenary celebration and a memorial publication has been completed. The memorial was presented by the president of Bangladesh, Abdul Hamid; the prime minister of Bangladesh, Sheikh Hasina; and several ministers and politicians. The programme was attended by Minister of Planning Muhammad Abdul Mannan, Minister of Environment, Forest and Climate Change Md. Shahab Uddin, former education minister Nurul Islam Nahid, and many others. Notable academics from Egypt, India, and Pakistan were also present.

== Educational facilities ==
In 1977, the madrasa achieved Alim (college) status from the Bangladesh Madrasah Education Board. It achieved Fazil (undergraduate) status in 1989, Kamil Hadith (post-graduate in Hadith studies) status in 1994, and Kamil Tafsir (post-graduate in Quranic exegesis) in 2001. Although the Dakhil and Alim certificates were recognised by the government of Bangladesh as equivalents to SSC and HSC respectively, Fazil and Kamil were not equated with bachelor's degree and master's degree prior to 2006. In 2005, the Fazil and Kamil madrasas demanded that the value of these certificates be recognised. The movement also became active demanding the establishment of an independent Arabic university. In this latter demand, Abdul Latif Chowdhury Fultali led a long march from Sylhet to Dhaka in 2006. In the same year, the government recognised the value of Fazil and Kamil certificates as B.A. and M.A., assigning it under the Islamic University of Bangladesh. In 2010, the government introduced 4-year Fazil courses for 31 madrasas across the country, including the Fultali madrasas. The madrasa is currently under the syllabus of Islamic Arabic University.

== See also ==
- Darul Hadis Latifiah
