= Government Madrasah-e-Alia =

Madrasa in Bangladesh

- Dhaka Alia Madrasah
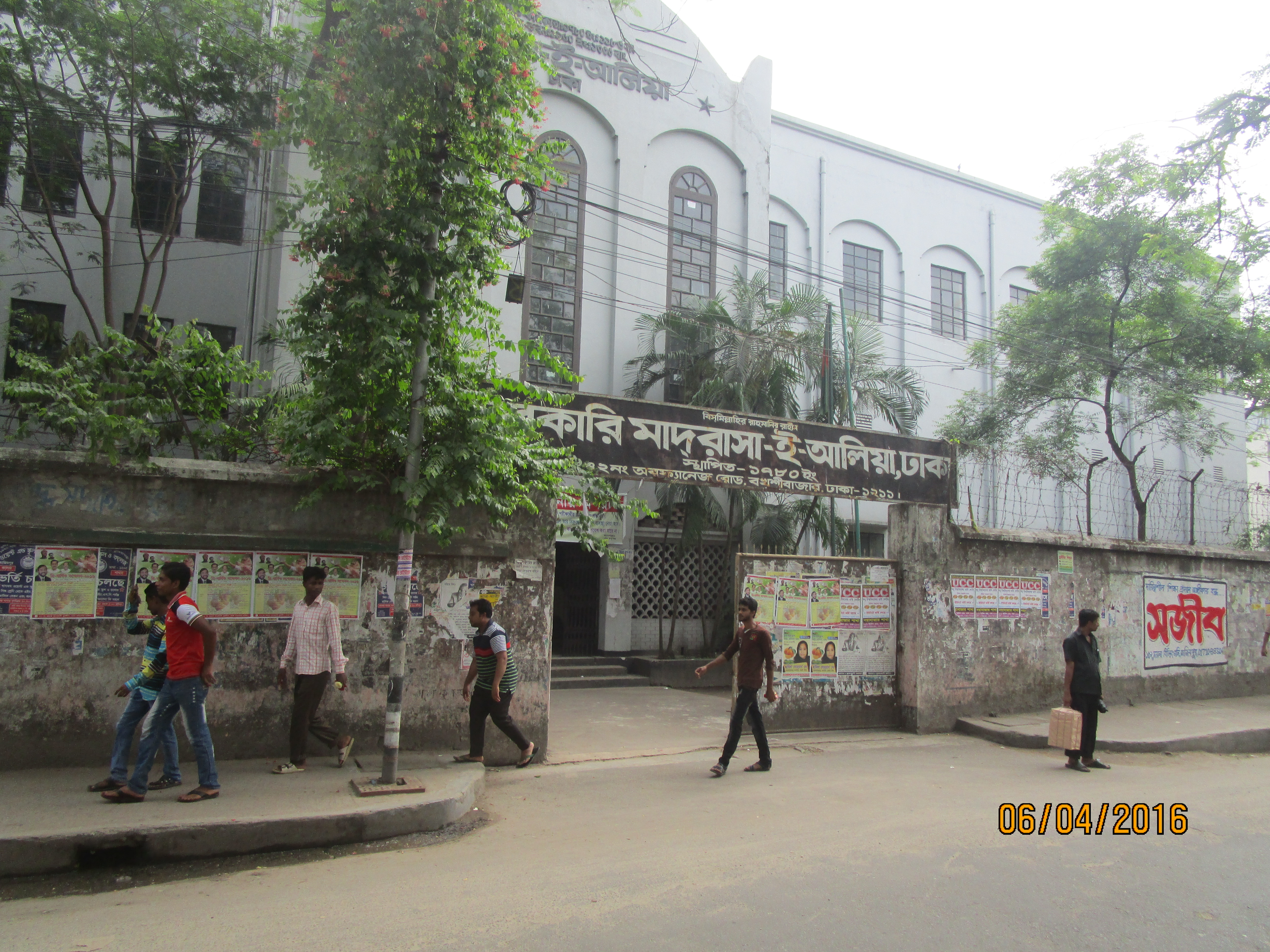
- Type: Islamic university
- Established: 1780
- Affiliations: Bangladesh Madrasah Education Board & Islamic Arabic University
- Rector: Md. Alamgir Rahman
- Location: Bakshibazar, Dhaka, Bangladesh; 23.7227°N 90.3942°E
- Website: www.dhkgovmalia.edu.bd

Government Madrasah-e-Alia (Arabic: المدرسة العالية الحكومية, Bengali: সরকারী মাদ্রাসা-ই-আলিয়া) is a government madrasa located in Bakshibazar, Dhaka, Bangladesh. Since its founding, the madrasah has been playing a significant role in imparting and spreading Islamic education.

== History ==
Alia Madrasah was established in 1780 by British government and formed Madrasah Education Board of Bengal. Madrasah Education was then started formally. Consequently, Madrasah Education was reformed. To materialize this declaration of share-E-Bangla a committee named Moula Box was formed. This committee, along with the advice of establishing a University for Madrasah students, advises in the following way for the entire development of Madrasah Education. In 1947 after the independence of Pakistan, many commissions was formed for the development of Madrasah Education. Among them in 1949 "West Bengal Educational System Reconstruction Committee" and in 1963-64, the name of Arabic University were especially mentionable.

On 4 April 2005, activists of Islami Chhatra Shibir and Jatiyatabadi Chhatra Dal over a stolen phone. Jatiyatabadi Chhatra Dal stated that they would not Shibir to establish "supremacy" in the madrasa.

On 14 April 2011, students of the madrasa clashed with staff of Dhaka Education Board over a road accident between a car and a rickshaw. Ten students of the madrasa were injured and 5 detained by Bangladesh Police.

== Notable staff ==
- Abdur Rahim
- Ayub Ali
- Amimul Ehsan Barkati
- Ubaidul Haq
- Abdur Rahman Kashgari
- Deen Muhammad Khan
- Zafar Ahmad Usmani

== Notable alumni ==
- Khandaker Abdullah Jahangir, former professor at Islamic University, Bangladesh
- Muhiuddin Khan, translator of the Quran
- Muhammad Qudrat-i-Khuda, founder of the Council of Scientific and Industrial Research
- Motiur Rahman Nizami, former leader of Bangladesh Jamaat-e-Islami
- Saifur Rahman Nizami, recipient of the Ekushey Padak
- Abdul Qayum, British scholar
- Habibur Rahman, politician
- AKM Yusuf, Hadith scholar and politician
- Kamaluddin Zafree, founder of Bangladesh Islami University
- Abubakar Muhammad Zakaria, professor at Islamic University, Bangladesh

== See also ==
- Qawmi
- Education in Bangladesh
- Al-Haiatul Ulya Lil-Jamiatil Qawmia Bangladesh
- Bangladesh Qawmi Madrasah Education Board
- Bangladesh Madrasah Education Board
- Islam in Bangladesh
- Bengali Muslims
- Baitul Mukarram
