= Kamaluddin Zafree =

Bangladesh Islamic scholar (born 1945)

Syed Kamaluddin Abdullah Zafree

Personal life
- Born: 5 March 1945 (age 81) Bhola, Bengal Presidency
- Main interest(s): Hadith studies, education
- Occupation: Faqih, academic
- Website: kamaluddinzafree.com

Religious life
- Religion: Islam
- Denomination: Sunni

Muslim leader
- Influenced by: Ibn Baz, Yusuf al-Qaradawi

Sayed Kamaluddin Abdullah Zafree (born 5 March 1945) is an Islamic scholar from Bangladesh. He is the chairman of the board of trustees of Bangladesh Islami University. He is the chairman of the Sharia Council of Prime Islami Life Insurance Limited.

== Birth and Family Background ==
Sayed Kamaluddin Abdullah Zafree was born on 3 March 1945, to a scholarly family in the village of Sayed Auliya in Burhanuddin, Bhola Island. The family trace ancestry to an Arab Islamic preacher, known by locals as Sayed Auliya, who had arrived in South Bengal with his family in the eighteenth century. They were granted two small islands east and west of the coast of Bhola rent-free by the erstwhile jagirdar Agha Baqer Khan, land grants such as this were common for foreign scholars visiting Bengal. Zafree's paternal grandfather, Mufti Sayed Abdul Hadi, was a khalifah of Furfura Sharif's Mohammad Abu Bakr Siddique, a gold medalled graduate of the Calcutta Alia Madrasa and the founder of the local Mirzakalu Islamia Fazil Madrasa. His father, Sayed Abu Zafar Abdullah, was a famed mawlana and the principal of the aforementioned madrasa. Zafree's mother, Fatema Khatun, was the daughter of Alhaj Maqbul Ahmed of Mahadevpur, a khalifah (successor) of the Pir of Kolagachia and acquaintance of Syed Abdul Ghani Madani.

== Early life and education ==
Zafree completed his primary education at the village maktab, before joining the Mirzakalu Islamia Fazil Madrasa whose principal at that time was his father. At an early age, Zafree founded the Namaz Qayem Parishad, which encouraged local youth to establish prayers. In 1956, Zafree enrolled at the Kumradi Darul Uloom Senior Fazil Madrasa in Shibpur, Narsingdi, which was one of the best alia madrasas in East Bengal at the time. Aged only eleven years, Zafree was unable to cope at Kumradi and returned to Mirzakalu Madrasa. He passed his dakhil qualification from Mirzakalu in 1958. He then returned to Kumradi for four years, completing his alim qualification in 1962. Although he spent two more years undertaking the fazil course in Kumradi, he could not take the examinations and was returned home, where he completed the exams at Mirzakalu in 1964.

Zafree then enrolled at the Government Madrasah-e-Alia in Dhaka, for his higher education and kamil degree. However, he became engrossed with numerous responsibilities and was unable to continue his studies there. Due to the critical situation in erstwhile East Pakistan, Zafree joined the Jamiat Ettehadul Ulama presided by Muhammad Abdul Ali, a member of the East Pakistan Provincial Assembly. Despite being a student, Zafree was appointed as the vice-president of the organisation's East Pakistan branch from 1967 to 1968 due to his fluency in both Bengali and Urdu. He was then employed by national radio Radio Pakistan (Dacca Centre) as a host for their Islamic programme, Amader Zindegi (Our Life). It was this role which led to Zafree becoming famous across the country. As a result, the Baitul Musharraf Mosque committee in Mirpur offered him the position of imam and khatib (sermon-giver) at their mosque. Zafree accepted the offer, and became engaged with numerous religious responsibilities which made him unable to continue his studies at Madrasah-e-Alia. In 1971, Muhammad Abdussalam, the founding principal of the Durbati Madinatul Uloom Alia Madrasa in Kaliganj, Gazipur, appointed Zafree as the Second Muhaddith with a wage of 220 takas. Zafree spent two years teaching in Durbati and simultaneously studied for his kamil degree there, graduating first class with honours from the faculty of Hadith in 1973. He studied at the Umm al-Qura University in Makkah after Saudi officials visited his madrasa in 1978.

== Career ==
Zafree was famed for his public religious speeches since his time as a student at Kumradi madrasa in Narsingdi. His popularity increased significantly whilst teaching at Durbati, gaining a growing following in Narsingdi. Zafree subsequently moved to Narsingdi, as a result of numerous invitations from various Muslim leaders there such as Rustam Ali Ashrafi, Ashabuddin Madhu Bhuiyan, Muhammad Jalaluddin, Abdur Rahman Bhuiyan, Tayebuddin Bhuiyab, Tafazzal Husayn, AKM Zainul Abidin, Tota Miah, Shamsher Ali, Shamsuddin Bhuiyan, Shahabuddin Miah, Muhammad Badruzzaman and Mawlana Fazlul Haq.

The aforementioned scholars also appealed to Zafree to help them establish a modern residential Islamic university in Bangladesh. Zafree accepted their proposal and promised to dedicate himself to this task. The first meeting was held on 7 January 1974 at the Brahmandi Mor Jame Masjid (now Baitul Aman Mosque), with Zafree officially becoming a member of the organising committee. The ninth meeting was held on 4 August 1976 in which the inaugural secretary Muhammad Jalaluddin stepped down due to other responsibilities. Subsequently, Zafree was unanimously nominated as the committee's secretary after an initial nomination by Bashir Uddin, backed by Shamsher Ali. The Jamea Quasemia Kamil Madrasa was established in the same year, with Zafree becoming its founding principal.

In 1977, the Jamea Quasemia management committee decided to send Zafree to Saudi Arabia, to perform the Hajj pilgrimage. Zafree also found an opportunity to appeal of the Muslim World League, who responded by gifting 12 lakh takas for the development of the Jamea Quasemia. The funds were used to build the Imam Ibn Taymiyyah building and buy land for the madrasa eidgah. The Saudi ambassador Fouad Abdulhameed Alkhateeb visited the madrasa in 1978, during the annual meeting, and provided assistance in enrolling at the Umm al-Qura University in Makkah, where Zafree studied classical Arabic for two years. During his time there, he also presented Islamic programmes on Radio Jeddah. Abd al-Aziz Ibn Baz, the Grand Mufti of Saudi Arabia, appointed him as his representative in Bangladesh.

In 2006, he founded the Bangladesh Islami University in Dhaka, and serves as the chairman of its governing body. Zafree was also the founder of the Holy Crescent School in Uttara, an Islamic school in line with the British Curriculum.

Zafree appears in ATN Bangla as an advisor in its Islamic programmes section. In addition to Bangladesh and Saudi Arabia, Zafree has toured forty countries. He has visited the United Kingdom where he was invited to numerous public events and radio shows in Manchester and London's Channel S. He has served as an imam and khatib at the East London Mosque, including Eid prayers, and was a chairman of its committee. He was the founding chairman of a mosque during his travels to Austria, with the present imam and khatib being his student Rafiqul Islam Madani. Zafree was one of the founders of the Toronto Islamic Centre in Canada.

=== Finance ===
Zafree has been playing a leading role in the introduction of an interest-free financial system in Bangladesh. He is one of the founding secretaries of the Islami Bank Bangladesh Ltd's Sharia Advisory Council. He is also the chairman of the Central Shariah Council for Islamic Insurance of Bangladesh. Zafree is serving as the chairman of numerous Sharia boards of Bangladeshi life insurance companies as well. Outside of Bangladesh, he was also the chairman of Al-Amin Commercial's Sharia board in Europe.

=== Social activities ===
Zafree was involved in an awareness campaign against AIDS, funded by the United Nations Fund for Population Activities as part of its intervention program involving religious leaders.

Zafree founded and served as the principal of Jamea Quasemia Madrsah.

He founded the Bangladesh Islami University in 2006 and serves as the chairman of its governing body. He is also the chairman of the Central Shariah Council for Islamic Insurance of Bangladesh.

== Views ==
In 2005, at a seminar of Islamic scholars in Dhaka, Zafree and others denounced terrorism in the name of Islam and endorsed the BNP-led government's fight against it.
