= Darul Hadis Latifiah Northwest =

Location
- Plum Street; Oldham, Greater Manchester, OL8 1TJ; England
- Coordinates: 53.5364955°N 2.1291668°W

Information
- Type: Private school
- Religious affiliation: Islam
- Established: 2012
- Local authority: Oldham Council
- Proprietor: Mohammed Abdul Musabbir
- Department for Education URN: 138568 Tables
- Ofsted: Reports
- Principal: Salman Ahmed Chowdhury
- Gender: Boys
- Age range: 11–16
- Enrolment: 88
- Capacity: 110
- Website: www.dhlnw.org.uk

Darul Hadis Latifiah Northwest (Arabic: دار الحديث لطيفية) is an Islamic private school for 11 to 16-year-old boys in Oldham, Greater Manchester, England. It was established in 2012 by parents and community leaders.

== History ==
Darul Hadis Latifiah Northwest was established in 2012 by Maulana Husam Uddin Chowdhury Fultali and his son Maulana Hasan Chowdhury Fultali.

== See also ==
- Badedeorail Fultali Kamil Madrasa
- Darul Hadis Latifiah
