= Kamil degree =

The Kamil examination (Arabic: اختبار كامل) is the highest government exam for Alia Madrasa students in Bangladesh. According to the policy, it is considered equivalent to the post-graduate degree of general education in Bangladesh. In 1907, the British government first allowed the Calcutta Alia Madrasa to open a three-year title class (post-graduate) through the Calcutta Conference. In 1915, Pir Allama Shah Sufi Nesaruddin Ahmad established the first Sarsina Darussunnat Kamil Madrasa in Bangladesh, which is also widely known as Sarshina Madrasa throughout the country. After 1947, this name gradually became popular in Bangladesh as Kamil Class or Kamil Exam. Currently, the number of Kamil Madrasas in Bangladesh is 215 in 2019. All Kamil and Fazil Madrasas in Bangladesh are affiliated with the Islamic Arabic University.

== History ==
Although Madrasa-e-Alia was established in 1780, its highest degree, Kamil, was first held in 1910, at that time known as the Title Class, which is now equivalent to a Master's degree.

In 1927, on the proposal of Shamsul Huda Committee, the unique examination of all the old scheme senior madrasas including Bengal and Assam, along with the Fakhrul Muhaddisin (now Kamil Examination) was held centrally for the first time. At that time, the syllabus of Kamil included the 6 books of Hadith of Sittah, Usulul Hadith, Tafsirul Majmuul Bayan, Tafsirul Bayzabi, Tafsirul Kashshaf, Tafsirul Kabir, Al Fiqh, Usulul Fiqh, Balagat-Mantiq and many other important syllabus. In 1978, on the proposal of the Senior Madrasa Education System Committee, in 1984, the syllabus was changed to align Madrasa education with general education and the Kamil level was made 2 years in duration.

== Affiliation ==
Only students from Kamil Madrasas in Bangladesh can participate in the Kamil examination. In 2006, Kamil Madrasas were included in the Islamic University, Kushtia, to modernize and provide them with equal access to general education. At that time, 198 Kamil (postgraduate) madrasas were affiliated to the university. In 2010, 31 notable madrasas in the country were granted undergraduate equivalent courses, with the Fazil examination being awarded for undergraduate studies and the Kamil examination being awarded for postgraduate studies. In 2016, Alia Madrasa was transferred under the Islamic Arabic University, and undergraduate and postgraduate degrees were introduced in 21 other madrasas. Currently, full bachelor's degrees are awarded in 52 Kamil Madrasas in Bangladesh.
