= Muhammadabad Islamia Alim Madrasah =

Madrasa in Dhaka, Bangladesh

Location
- Dhaka; Bangladesh
- Coordinates: 23.7896°N 90.3600°E

Information
- Type: Alim Madrasa
- Established: 1983
- Principal: Rafiqul Islam
- Enrollment: 500
- Website: muhammadabad.edu.bd

Muhammadabad Islamia Alim Madrasah (Arabic: المدرسة الإسلامية العالمية محمد آباد, Bengali: মুহাম্মদাবাদ ইসলামিয়া আলিম মাদরাসা) is an Alim (higher secondary) madrasa, situated in the Middle Paikpara of Mirpur, Dhaka, Bangladesh. It was established in 1983. It has hostel facility for non-resident students, and various services for poor students. This institute arrange various kinds of cultural programs every year. The principal of this Madrasah, Rafiqul Islam, was awarded the "Best Principal of the Dhaka City" consecutively for three times.

== See also ==
- Bangladesh Madrasah Education Board
