= Alim examination =

School examination in Bangladesh

Alim examination is a government-run exam conducted under the Bangladesh Madrasa Board. This exam has been given the equivalent of Higher Secondary Certificate exam by Bangladesh Education Board. To participate in this exam, students from any Madrasa approved by Bangladesh Madrasa Education Board in Alim class 12th have to pass the test exam and sit for the main exam on the date fixed by the board. At the Alim or higher secondary level, students have the option of choosing either the science or arts department. Students in both departments have to study the Quran, Hadith, and Sharia law. On the other hand, students in the arts department have to study Arabic and Persian languages, and students in the sciences have to study physics, chemistry, and biology, among other subjects.
