= Dakhil examination =

- Administrator: Bangladesh Madrasah Education Board
- Duration: 3 hours
- Score range: 0-100 marks / 0-5 points
- Regions: Bangladesh
- Prerequisites: Must pass the test exam.
- Website: bmeb.gov.bd

Dakhil examination is a government exam for Dakhil Madrasas in Bangladesh. It is conducted under the Bangladesh Madrasah Education Board. This exam has been given the equivalent of the Secondary School Certificate exam by the Bangladesh Government and the Madrasah Education Board. To participate in this exam, students from any madrasa approved by the Bangladesh Madrasa Board in the 10th grade must pass the test exam. And students have to sit for the main exam on the date determined by the board.
