= Azizur Rahman Qayed =

Islamic scholar from Bangladesh

Maulana Azizur Rahman Qayed

Personal life
- Born: 1 January 1911 Nesarabad, Jhalokati District
- Died: April 28, 2008 (aged 97)
- Children: 1
- Education: Charsina Darussunnat Kamil Madrasa, Calcutta Alia Madrasa
- Known for: Islamic scholar, educationist
- Occupation: Academic

Religious life
- Religion: Islam
- Institute: Islami Oikya Sangathan

Muslim leader
- Students: Muhammad Mustafizur Rahman, Delwar Hossain Sayeedi, Maulana Abdur Rob Khan, Akhtar Faruq, Maulana Poet Ruhul Amin Khan, Maulana Shamsuddin, A. R. M. Ali Haidar Murshidi, M. A. Malek, Maulana Md. Amzad Hossain

Maulana Muhammad Azizur Rahman Qayed Nesarabadi (1911–2008) was a prominent Islamic scholar, Sufi leader, and social reformer from Bangladesh. He was popularly known as Qayed Saheb Huzur. He founded the Nesarabad Darbar Sharif and the Jhalakathi N S Kamil Madrasa. He also organized several Islamic movements and introduced the principle of Al-Ittihad Ma’al Ikhtilaf (unity despite differences).

== Birth and early life ==
Azizur Rahman Qayed was born in 1911 in Basanda (present-day Nesarabad) village of Jhalokati District. His father, Mawlavi Mofizur Rahman, was a khalifa of Bahadurpur Darbar and a close associate of Sufi Munshi Meherullah in the historic debates with Christian missionaries during the British era. His grandfather, Qurban Munshi, was buried in Jannatul Mualla. Since Qayed was born in Nesarabad, the suffix Nesarabadi was added to his name.

== Career ==
Qayed began his career as a teacher. From 1943 to 1969, he taught at Charsina Darussunnat Alia Madrasa, where he also served as vice principal. He was regarded as a philosopher, reformer, preacher, advocate of Islamic unity, and a spiritual guide. He also founded and edited the fortnightly Tableegh and the weekly Ishayat.

=== Notable students ===
Some of his prominent students included:

- Muhammad Mustafizur Rahman, former Vice-Chancellor, Islamic University, Kushtia
- Delwar Hossain Sayeedi, Quran commentator
- Maulana Abdur Rob Khan, former principal of Charsina Aliya Madrasa
- Akhtar Faruq, former editor of the Daily Sangram
- Maulana Poet Ruhul Amin Khan, Executive Editor of Daily Inqilab
- Ansar Uddin, University of Dhaka
- Maulana Shamsuddin, former president, Islamic Social Welfare Council, Chittagong
- A. R. M. Ali Haidar Murshidi, University of Dhaka
- M. A. Malek, University of Dhaka
- Fazlur Rahman, University of Dhaka
- Maulana Khaled Saifullah Siddiqui, writer and researcher
- Principal Maulana Salah Uddin, Dhaka Government Alia Madrasa; Khatib of Baitul Mukarram National Mosque
- A. N. M. Abdul Mannan, University of Dhaka
- Maulana Md. Amzad Hossain, former principal, Charsina Aliya Madrasa

== Contributions ==
Qayed devoted his life to uniting Muslims. In 1941, while a student at Calcutta Alia Madrasa, he founded Anjuman al-Islam. In 1945, under the guidance of the Pir of Furfura Sharif, the organization was renamed Hizbullah Jamiyatul Mujahideen. Later, in 1950, under the Pir of Charsina Sharif, it became Jamiyat-e-Hizbullah. Though the names changed, its objectives remained the same. He later declared Shah Abu Zafar Muhammad Saleh of Charsina Sharif as its Amir, while continuing as the founding Nazem-e-Ala.

Qayed introduced the principle of Al-Ittihad Ma’al Ikhtilaf (unity despite differences), which gained popularity. To promote this idea, he founded the Jamiyatul Musliheen. In 1997, he organized the first All-Party Islamic Conference in Bangladesh, held in Jhalokati. He also established numerous educational institutions, including the Jhalokati N.S. Kamil Madrasa, which grew into a large complex with 42 affiliated institutions.

He founded social organizations to protest injustice, resolve disputes, and promote unity, including:

- Hizbullah Darul Qaza (religious arbitration court)
- Student Hizbullah
- Ideal Society Implementation Committee
- Hizbullah Workers’ Association
- Tolabaye Hizbullah
- Hizbullah Anti-Corruption Committee (1973)
- Anjuman-e-Ittihadul Muslimin (1967)
- Bangladesh Hizbullah Jamiyatul Musliheen

== Philosophy ==
Qayed believed that Islam could not thrive through a divided nation. He argued that Muslims should unite despite minor disagreements. He opposed extremism and terrorism, advocating lawful and peaceful movements instead. He encouraged adopting good practices from any faith and admired the spiritual songs of Rabindranath Tagore and Nakul Kumar Biswas.

== Death ==
Azizur Rahman Qayed died on 28 April 2008. Hundreds of thousands attended his funeral at Nesarabad, with estimates of half a million people over a ten-square-kilometer area. He was respected by people of all communities, including Hindus of Jhalokati, who even held special prayers for him during his illness.

== Nesarabad Darbar Sharif ==
The Jamiyatul Musliheen continues under his son, Principal Maulana Khalilur Rahman Nesarabadi. Qayed established a Darbar Sharif at his residence, which became a major religious center. An annual Islamic gathering is held there, attended by hundreds of thousands.

== See also ==
- Syed Ahmad Barelvi
- Nesaruddin Ahmad
- Abu Zafar Mohammad Saleh
