= 2025 Gopalganj clashes =

Political violence in Bangladesh

- Part of Bangladesh post-resignation violence (2024–2026) and Operation Devil Hunt
- Date: 16 July 2025
- Location: Gopalganj, Bangladesh
- Caused by: National Citizen Party's "July Podojatra" and "March to Gopalganj" programme following the demolition of Dhanmondi 32
- Goals: Disruption of the programme; Killings on NCP leadership
- Methods: Arson; Stone pelting; Vandalism; Riots
- Result: Suppressed: Curfew imposed and mass arrest in the town of Gopalganj; Evacuation of the NCP leadership from Gopalganj; Criticism and concern over casualties; Nationwide counter-protests

Parties
Awami League (Note: Activities outlawed since May 2025); Chhatra League (Note: Organization outlawed since August 2024)	Government of Bangladesh; Bangladesh Police; Rapid Action Battalion; Border Guard Bangladesh; Bangladesh Army; National Citizen Party

Lead figures
Sheikh Hasina (Note: Exiled in India since August 2024); Obaidul Quader (Note: Location unknown since August 2024); Saddam Hussain	Muhammad Yunus; (Bangladesh) Jahangir Alam Chowdhury; (Bangladesh) Asif Mahmud; Nahid Islam; Akhter Hossain; Tasnim Jara; Sarjis Alam; Hasnat Abdullah

Casualties
- Deaths: 5 (Note: 4 during the clashes, 1 succumbed to injuries in the hospital. See Casualties.)
- Damage: Gopalganj Poura Park, Gopalganj Central Jail, Chourangee Intersection, and many other places

On 16 July 2025, a group of attackers clashed with the security forces in Gopalganj, Bangladesh, surrounding a rally of the National Citizen Party (NCP) in the city, when the attackers tried to disrupt the programme with violent means. Television footage showed that attackers, alleged by the NCP and the security forces being the Awami League and Chhatra League, armed with sticks and clubs, attacking the police and setting their vehicles on fire. The violence left at least 5 people dead and several more injured.

The violence created an extremely tense atmosphere in the town of Gopalganj. It received widespread condemnation from various parties, including the interim government.

== Background ==
On 1 June 2025, National Citizen Party (NCP) launched a month-long programme Desh Gorte July Podojatra ("July March for Building the Country"), commemorating the year-anniversary of the July Uprising of July-August 2024, which overthrew Sheikh Hasina's authoritarian regime. The march was launched across all districts of Bangladesh as a "part of its drive to position itself as a new force in Bangladeshi politics".

On 16 July, they arrived at the district of Gopalganj, known being a stronghold of the Awami League (AL) since the country's independence. The district is the ancestral home and burial site of Hasina's father and the country's first president, Sheikh Mujibur Rahman. Al Jazeera cited, "Hasina would go on to contest elections from the constituency."

After Hasina's self-imposed exile in the last year, her supporters staged a blockade in the same city on 10 August with the aim of "bringing back Hasina", where they had vandalised and torched an army vehicle in the Dhaka–Khulna highway. The subsequent clashes left many injured, including four members of the army.

Apart from the scheduled programme, NCP Chief Organizer (North) Sarjis Alam had declared a "March to Gopalganj" event on the Facebook.

== Prelude ==
According to the locals, the Awami League members reportedly tried to agitate them through various disinformation and rumors before the NCP's programme.

Before the main clashes, at around 9.30 am (BST), a police vehicle was attacked and set on fire on the Ulpur–Durgapur Road at Khatiyagarh Charpara in the Gopalganj Sadar Upazila. Three police members were injured in the violence. Upon receiving news, around 11.30 am, Upazila Nirbahi Officer (UNO) Md Rakibul Hasan went to visit the spot, where a group of people attacked his vehicle at Kansur area while returning. The driver of his vehicle was injured.

== Clashes ==
Around 1.45 pm, some 200-300 people with sticks and clubs arrived at the Gopalganj Poura Park (municipal park), the venue of the NCP rally, who vandalised the chairs and tore down the banners chanting the "Joy Bangla" slogan. After District Police Superintendent Md Mizanur Rahman arrived, the NCP activists regrouped and, along with police, chased the attackers away.

At around 2.05 pm, central NCP leaders, including Convener Nahid Islam, Member Secretary Akhter Hossain, Senior Joint Member Secretary Tasnim Jara, Chief Organizer (South) Hasnat Abdullah and Chief Organizer (North) Sarjis Alam, arrived at the rally venue and the NCP held a limited rally there.

Around 2.45 pm, as the NCP leadership reached the Launch Ghat area near Gopalganj Government College, attackers regrouped, encircled the NCP members and blocked the police vehicles from all sides. Attackers pelted bricks on the cars of the central leaders of the party. At that moment, the police and the army personnel fired sound grenades and blank shots, attempting to bring the situation under control. The NCP leaders and activists turned their vehicles and left the spot through different route. Law enforcing agencies responded by pursuing the attackers, who had gathered at the nearby Chowrangee intersection, wielding sticks and throwing bricks at police. The police countered with sound grenades and tear gas.

NCP leaders attempted to leave the town, but were brought back in the police and RAB security due to massive attacks. A few moments later, the army reportedly fired some blank bullets to bring the situation under control. To regain control of the volatile situation, police and army personnel, augmented by four platoons of Border Guard Bangladesh (BGB), were deployed across the city.

NCP Secretary Akhter Hossain claimed that "terrorists were announced to be grouped" from mikes of the mosques of the city.

The NCP activists subsequently sought refuge at the Superintendent of the Police's office before being escorted under the army protection across the Mollahat Bridge, the entry point to Bagerhat, at approximately 5.30 pm. NCP leader Hasnat claimed that they weren't feel safe in the police station and the attackers "threatened to burn" them "alive".

=== Government response ===
The interim government deployed military personnel to evacuate NCP leaders. Several leaders from both sides have since called for calm, while others announced further demonstrations.

The interim government imposed a curfew in Gopalganj after the incident and arrested at least 24 people. Some injured were taken to the Dhaka Medical College Hospital, including one rickshaw driver who still had a bullet lodged in his leg.

== Aftermath ==
In the immediate aftermath of the clashes, the Gopalganj Deputy Commissioner Md Kamruzzaman imposed section 144 in the district. Later, the government imposed city-wide curfew in Gopalganj from 8.00 pm until 6.00 pm next day. From 17 July, curfew was imposed for indefinite time, with a break between 11.00 am and 2.00 pm on 18 July due to the Friday prayers. Higher Secondary Certificate (HSC) examination of 17 July was also postponed in the whole district.

The violence ultimately created an extremely tense and overcast atmosphere across the city, with shops in most areas shuttered amidst the clashes. The city of Gopalganj had become quite empty after the evening. Some people were reportedly seen returning home scattered with much panic.

Following the violence, top NCP leaders, including Akhtar, Hasnat, and Sarjis, were evacuated from Gopalganj with the assistance of the army, police, RAB, and BGB. A widely circulated video on social media showed them entering an armoured vehicle of the army. They were later taken to Khulna Circuit House and a local hotel.

== Casualties ==
Gopalganj district civil surgeon Abu Syeed Mohammad Faruk said that four people, all inhabitants of the town of Gopalganj, were killed during the clashes, which was confirmed by the caretaker of the 250 Bedded General Hospital Dr. Jibetish Biswas. The decreased were Dipto Saha, Ramjan Kazi, Sohel Molla and Imon Talukder. They were buried or cremated without postmortem examinations, which has raised serious concerns about the possibility of a cover-up. A Bangladesh Supreme Court lawyer, Jyotirmoy Barua, and rights group Ain o Salish Kendra criticized the decision, saying that autopsies are essential to determine who fired the fatal shots.

On 17 July, a rickshaw-puller name Ramzan Munshi died in the Dhaka Medical College Hospital, who was injured in the clashes.

== Investigations ==
Primary police report accused a group led by Gopalganj Municipal Branch Chhatra League's joint convener Md. Omar Faruq Khan Ripon, Kotalipara Upazila Chhatra League General Secretary Shamim Dariya and Municipal Chhatra League's Mamun responsible for the violence. The report also claimed that a violent mob forcefully took the dead bodies of the violence from the hospital, for which the postmortem examination could not become possible at all. The Ministry of Home Affairs formed a 3-member inquiry committee to investigate the incident.

== Reactions ==
=== Government ===
Chief Adviser of the interim government Muhammad Yunus blamed AL & it's student wing for the violence in an X post and claimed that "preventing young citizens from peacefully holding a rally to commemorate the one-year anniversary of their revolutionary movement is a shameful violation of their fundamental rights".

Adviser Asif Mahmud, in a Facebook post, urged general people of Gopalganj to stay at home "unless it is a matter of life and death". He said that the government was monitoring everything and confirmed the increase of the law enforcers, and threatened the attackers saying: "The terrorists of the banned organisation's will be broken".

Chief Adviser's Office issued a statement, saying, "This heinous act ... will not go unpunished."

=== Political parties ===
Major political parties, including the Bangladesh Nationalist Party (BNP) and Bangladesh Jamaat-e-Islami, condemned the attacks on the NCP rally. In separate statements, the parties termed the attack part of a broader attempt to destabilise the country, undermine the interim government and derail democratic transition; and urged the government to ensure justice and bring the perpetrators to account. Apart from them, Ganatantra Manch, Revolutionary Workers Party of Bangladesh, Socialist Party of Bangladesh, Gono Odhikar Parishad, Amar Bangladesh Party, Islami Andolan Bangladesh, Khelafat Majlis etc. also condemned the attacks.

=== Protests ===
Immediately after the attack, the NCP and the Students Against Discrimination (SAD) activists staged nationwide blockade on major roads, causing several kilometers of traffic congestion on the country's busiest highways. Students organizations like Bangladesh Jatiotabadi Chatradal and Bangladesh Islami Chhatrashibir organized separate protests in the University of Dhaka campus in response to the violence.

The NCP party head Nahid Islam announced a nationwide protest on 17 July against attacks in Gopalganj.

== Impact ==
According to the political analyst Zahed Ur Rahman, the Gopalganj incident questioned the interim government's efficiency of controlling internal violence and conducting the 2026 general election. He also claimed that government ultimately accepted the existence of an "Independent Awami Gopalganj". Apart from this, he claimed that the NCP got some initial advantage from the incident as they received public attention and empathy ahead of the polls, and also pointed out that their leadership also faced public backlash for evacuating the place hiding in an armoured vehicle.

Senior Journalist Mozammel Hossain opined:

If we ask who is most responsible for creating this tense situation, I would say the primary responsibility lies with the NCP, who led the march, [...] There's a real risk of a chain reaction. At a time when the nation is hoping for a peaceful transition, this sort of violence is the last thing we need.

== See also ==
- Criticism of Awami League
- July massacre
