= Secondary School Certificate (Bangladesh) =

Public examination in Bangladesh marking the completion of secondary education

- Acronym: SSC
- Type: Public Examination
- Administrator: Directorate of Secondary and Higher Education
- Score range: 0-100 marks per subject
- Offered: Bangladesh
- Regions: Nationwide (various education boards)
- Languages: Bengali, English
- Prerequisites: Completion of Junior School Certificate
- Website: dshe.gov.bd

The Secondary School Certificate (SSC; Bengali: মাধ্যমিক স্কুল সার্টিফিকেট) is a public examination in Bangladesh, administered by the Board of Intermediate and Secondary Education. It is taken by students after completing 10 years of schooling, at the end of Grade 10. The SSC serves as a academic qualification and is a prerequisite for higher secondary education (Grades 11 and 12). The examination is conducted annually, generally in the months of February or March, and covers a wide range of subjects across several academic streams including science, humanities, and business studies. Successful completion of the SSC allows students to pursue the Higher Secondary Certificate.

== Examination structure ==
The SSC examination in Bangladesh is held annually by the DSHE. The subjects include Bengali, English, General Math, Bangladesh and Global Studies, Religious Studies, and Information and Communication Technology as the mandatory subjects for all groups. Physics, Chemistry, Biology, and Higher Mathematics are for the science group; Accounting, Finance, and Business Entrepreneurship are for the Business Studies group; and History, Civics, Geography, and Economics are for the Humanities group.

== Boards of education ==
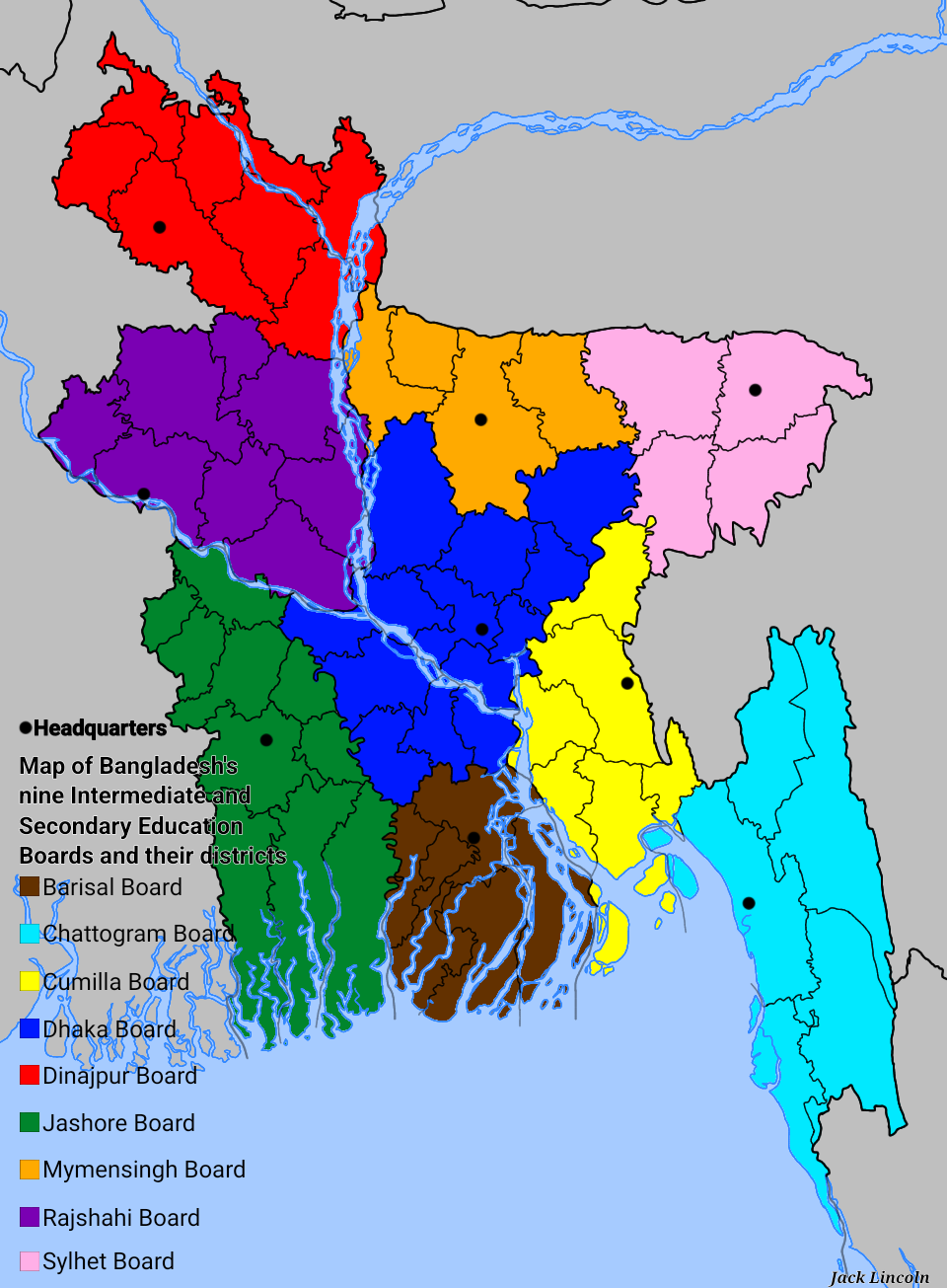
Map of Bangladesh's nine Intermediate and Secondary Education Boards and their districts

The SSC exam is conducted by various regional education boards across Bangladesh. Those are:

- Dhaka Education Board
- Rajshahi Education Board
- Chattogram Education Board
- Jashore Education Board
- Barishal Education Board
- Sylhet Education Board
- Dinajpur Education Board
- Comilla Education Board
- Mymensingh Education Board
- Vocational Education Board

Each board is responsible for organizing the examinations, publishing results, and ensuring the conduct of SSC exams in its jurisdiction.

== Grading system ==
A letter-grading system of publishing results of SSC examination was introduced in 2001. The SSC results are based on a grading system, as follows:

Grading System
Grade	Marks Range (%)	GPA
A+	80% or above	5.00
A	70–79%	4.00
A-	60–69%	3.50
B	50–59%	3.00
C	40–49%	2.00
D	33–39%	1.00
F	Below 33%	0.00

The grades are awarded based on the overall performance in the examinations, and the results determine students' eligibility for the Higher Secondary Certificate (HSC) exam. Students who fail in one or more subjects are required to retake the examination for those subjects in the following year's SSC examination.

== See also ==
- Secondary School Certificate of other countries
- Dakhil examination
- Education in Bangladesh
- List of Education Boards in Bangladesh
