= Bangladesh Islami University =

Private University In Bangladesh

Coordinates: 23.7212°N 90.4287°E

- Type: Private,
- Established: 2005; 21 years ago
- Affiliations: University Grants Commission
- Chancellor: President Hafiz Uddin Ahmad
- Vice-Chancellor: ব্রিগেডিয়ার জেনারেল কে এম সালজার হোসেন (অব.)
- Students: Around 8,000
- Undergraduates: 6,000
- Postgraduates: 2,000
- Location: Dhaka, Bangladesh
- Campus: Green Model Town, Manda, Dhaka.
- Website: biu.ac.bd

Bangladesh Islami University is a private university located at Green Model Town, Block-B, Road-03, in Dhaka, Bangladesh.

== History ==
Bangladesh Islami University was opened in 2006 by Prime Minister Begum Khaleda Zia at the request of Syed Kamaluddin Zafree, a prominent Islamic scholar. Syed Kamaluddin Zafree later became a member of the governing body of the university.

== See also ==
- List of Islamic educational institutions
