= Alia Madrasa =

Islamic education system in the Indian subcontinent

The Alia Madrasa or Alia Madrasa education system is a modern Islamic education system in the Indian subcontinent, combining Islamic and general education, and is considered the oldest education system in the subcontinent since the beginning of British rule in India. In 1780, Warren Hastings, the governor of Fort William in Bengal, introduced this educational system by establishing the Calcutta Alia Madrasa. Later, many madrasas were established in India, Pakistan, and Bangladesh based on the model of this Kolkata Alia Madrasa; these educational institutions are basically called Alia Madrasas.

Alia Madrasa teaches all general subjects including Quran, Hadith, science, mathematics and English. Therefore, Alia Madrasa students can compete in various government job examinations. According to the curriculum, in Aliya Madrasa, 5 years are spent in Ebtedayi or primary education, 5 years in Dakhil or secondary education, 2 years in Alim or higher secondary education, 3 years in Fazil or undergraduate education, and 2 years in Kamil or postgraduate education. In all, a total of 16 years of course are conducted from Ebtedayi to Kamil. Currently, the Ebtedayi, Dakhil, and Alim levels of Alia Madrasa in Bangladesh are affiliated with the Bangladesh Madrasa Education Board, and the Fazil and Kamil levels are affiliated with the Islamic Arabic University.

== History ==
The Calcutta Alia Madrasa, founded by Lord Warren Hastings in 1780, is considered one of the oldest examples of education in the Indian subcontinent. Apart from this, among the unique educational systems, the University of Calcutta was established in 1857 under the English education system and Darul Uloom Deoband in 1866 under the Qaumi education system. Therefore, the Alia Madrasa education system is said to be the oldest in the whole of India.

=== 1780-1914 ===
When the Calcutta Alia Madrasa was established in 1780, committees were formed at various times to reform the syllabus and education of the madrasa. In 1791, the Board of Directors of the Calcutta Madrasa introduced the curriculum and syllabus for the first time. This syllabus was implemented in the Calcutta Alia Madrasa and was also implemented in all the madrasas affiliated to this madrasa in Bengal, Assam, Bihar and Orissa. Then in 1869, a new committee was formed and some amendments were made to the curriculum again. In 1871, the Justice Norman Committee made some changes to the Bengal Madrasa education system. To spread the educational system of Calcutta Madrasa to East Bengal, three government Aliya Madrasas were established in 1873 with the funds of the Mohsin Trust: Dhaka Madrasa (now Kabi Nazrul Government College, Dhaka and Islamia Government High School, Dhaka), Chittagong Madrasa (now Government Haji Muhammad Mohsin College, Chittagong and Haji Muhammad Mohsin Government High School, Chittagong) and Rajshahi Madrasa (now Haji Muhammad Mohsin Government High School, Rajshahi).

The 36 recommendations of the Hunter Committee Report of 1882 were implemented by 1884, bringing about a dynamic change in the education system. In 1907, the Calcutta Conference of the British government allowed the Calcutta Aliya Madrasa to open a three-year title class equivalent to a Master's degree. In 1910, the Mohammedan Education Advisory Committee, formed under the leadership of Principal A.H. Hurley, made some further reforms in the Madrasa education system.

=== 1914-1947 ===
In 1914, the curriculum prepared by the Mohammedan Education Advisory Committee led by Shamsul Ulama Abu Nasr Wahid proposed the Old Scheme and New Scheme Madrasah systems and it was implemented in 1915. Basically, to make Muslim students interested in English education, two types of New Scheme Madrasahs were started, namely Junior and Senior. At that time, junior madrasahs taught up to the fifth grade and senior madrasahs taught up to the 10th grade. The curriculum of these senior madrasahs was made compulsory and included in the government grant. At that time, Muslim students were also interested in learning English to get government jobs, which is why they preferred to study in New Scheme Madrasahs. At that time, the New Scheme education system quickly became popular.

The Shamsul Huda Committee in 1927 recommended the central organization of examinations for the Alim, Fazil and Fakhrul Muhaddisin classes of the Old Scheme Senior Madrasas of Bengal and Assam and proposed the formation of a Madrasa Education Board to organize these central examinations. On the advice of this committee, the subjects of Sihah Sittah (Bukhari Sharif, Muslim Sharif, Nasa'i, Tirmidhi, Ibn Mazah, Abu Dawood), Usulul Hadith, Tafsirul Bayzabi, Tafsirul Kashshaf, Tafsirul Kabir, Tafsirul Majmuul Bayan, Fiqh, Usulul Fiqh, Mantiq, History of Islam etc. were included in the Kamil syllabus.

In 1927, the first Madrasa Education Board was formed under the name of Central Madrasa Education Board, Bangla, at the initiative of Khwaja Kamaluddin Ahmed, a member of Mohammedan Education. The Calcutta Madrasa was affiliated to this education board as a government organization from 1927 to 1979.

The Muslim Education Advisory Committee or Momen Committee of 1931 and the Maula Bakhsh Committee of 1938-40 recommended reforms in Aliya Madrasa education. Also, the recommendations of the Syed Moazzamuddin Hossain Committee for educational reform and development in 1946 were fully accepted. As a result, many important Islamic subjects were included in the syllabus.

=== 1947-1971 ===
Long before 1947, many Aliya Madrasas were established in East Bengal on the model of Calcutta Madrasa. Among these madrasas, Noakhali Karamatia Madrasa (1850), Paikan Madrasa (1860), Sujaul Madrasa (1980), Mithachara Madrasa (1881), Sitakunda Madrasa (1886), Raipur Aliya Madrasa (1886), Faridganj Madrasa (1896), Sylhet Alia Madrasa (1913), Charchina Madrasa (1915) etc. are some of them. Also, before 1947, many government-approved and education board-approved madrasas were present in Bangladesh. Due to the partition of Bengal in 1947, a part of the idol Calcutta Madrasa of Aliya Madrasa was shifted to Dhaka. However, at that time, Dhaka University controlled the board examinations of all Aliya Madrasas in Bangladesh, including Dhaka Alia.

For the education reform of Aliya Madrasas, education commissions such as Mohammad Akram Khan's East Bengal Education System Reorganization Committee in 1949-51, Ashrafuddin Chowdhury Committee in 1956, Ataur Rahman Education Reform Commission in 1957, MM Sharif National Education Commission in 1958, SM Hossain's Islamic Arabic University Committee in 1963, Imamuddin Chowdhury's Madrasa Review Committee in 1969, Qudrat-e-Khuda Education Commission in 1972-73 were formed. Especially after the independence of Bangladesh, an organization called Madrasa Education Reform Organization made various recommendations for the development of Madrasa education in 1973. After the independence of Bangladesh, Alia Madrasas were included in the Dhaka Secondary and Higher Secondary Education Board, and later, when a separate Madrasa Education Board was formed for Madrasas in 1978, the Madrasas were transferred to this board.

As per the recommendations of the Qudrat-e-Khuda Education Commission, the national curriculum and multi-faceted curriculum were introduced in the Aliya Madrasas controlled by the Madrasa Board in 1975. Changes were made in the syllabus of the Alim examination held in 1978 and the Fazil examination held in 1980. According to this education commission, the Fazil examination was made equivalent to the General Education HSC and the Alim examination was made equivalent to the General Education SSC. This commission introduced the science branch in Madrasa education.

In 1978, the Senior Madrasa Education System Committee was formed under the leadership of Professor Mustafa Bin Qasim. Under the guidance of this committee, the level of education of Alia Madrasa controlled by the Bangladesh Madrasa Board was adjusted to the level of general education in 1984. A complete modern education system was introduced for Alia Madrasa, consisting of 5 years of Ebtedayi (primary), 5 years of Dakhil level (secondary), 2 years of Alim level (higher secondary), 2 years of Fazil level (degree) and 2 years of Kamil level (postgraduate), totaling 16 years. The curriculum was changed and the Dakhil examination was made equivalent to S.S.C and the Alim examination was made equivalent to H.S.C.

== University affiliation ==
Until 2006, all examinations of all Aliya Madrasas in Bangladesh were controlled by the Bangladesh Madrasa Education Board. According to the Islamic Universities Amendment Act of 2006, Aliya Madrasas were offered a 3-year Fazil (bachelor's degree) and a 2-year Kamil (postgraduate) course for a total of 5 years, and 1,086 Fazil (bachelor's) and 198 Kamil (postgraduate) madrasas in Bangladesh were affiliated to the Kushtia Islamic University. As a result, both the Fazil and Kamil examinations were equivalent to a full bachelor's degree in general education. In 2010, a graduate-equivalent course was introduced in 31 notable madrasas in Bangladesh, as a result of which only Fazil graduates were awarded a full bachelor's degree, and Kamil graduates were awarded a master's degree.

Then, in 2016, the Islamic Arabic University was established to further modernize madrasa education, and the Alia madrasas were then transferred there. In 2016, undergraduate and postgraduate degrees were introduced in 21 more madrasas.
