= Darul Hadis Latifiah =

- دار الحديث لطيفية
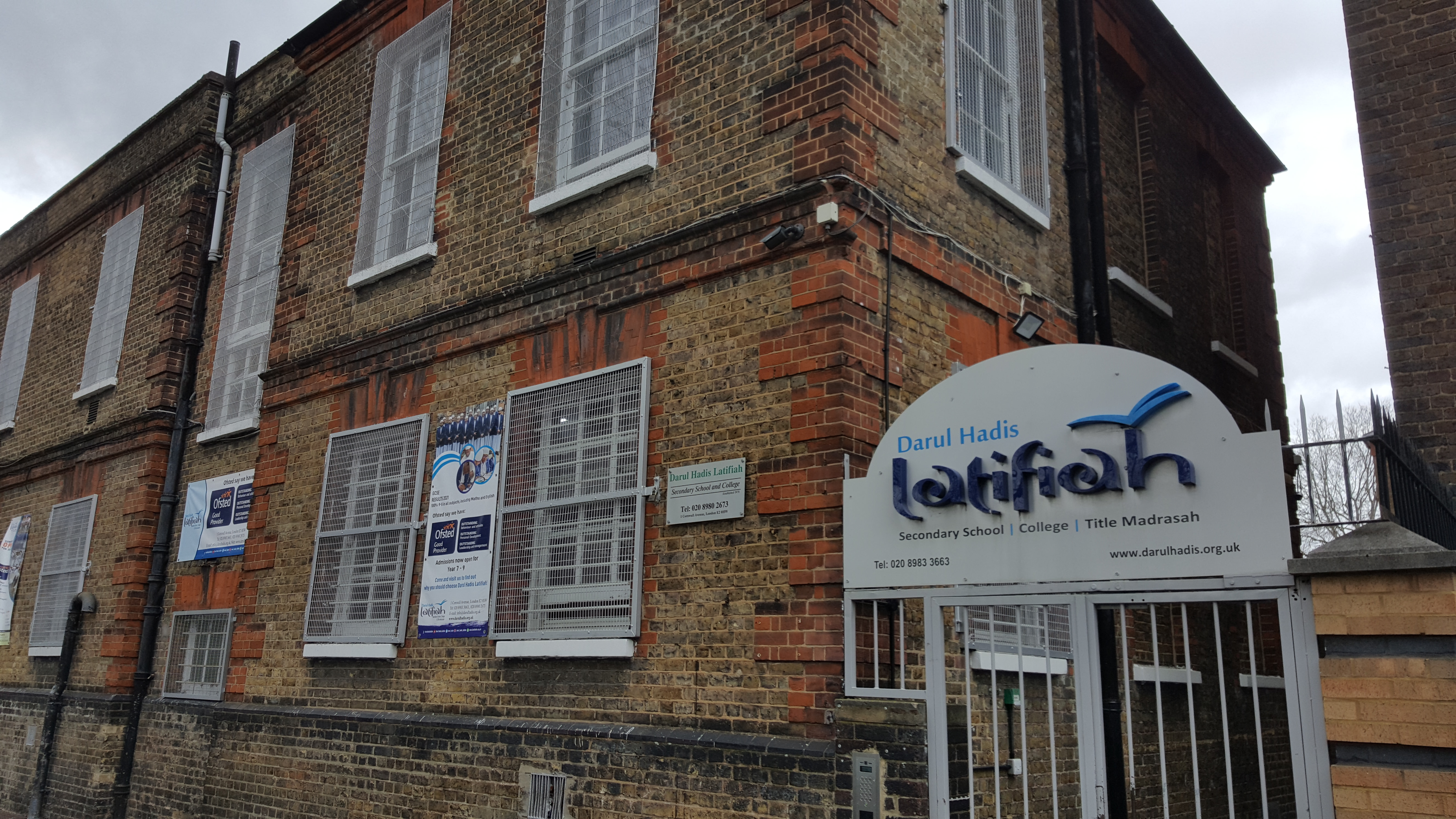

Location
- 1 Cornwall Avenue; Bethnal Green, Greater London, E2 0HW; England; 51.52632°N 0.05332°W

Information
- Former name: Madrasah-e-Darul Qirat Majidiah
- Type: Private school
- Religious affiliation: Islam
- Established: 1999
- Founder: Abdul Latif Chowdhury (Fultali Saheb)
- Local authority: London Borough of Tower Hamlets
- Proprietor: Hafiz Maulana Mohammed Abdul Jalil
- Department for Education URN: 131745 Tables
- Ofsted: Reports
- Principal: Muhammad Hasan Chowdhury
- Gender: Boys
- Age range: 11–20
- Enrolment: 92 (2019)
- Capacity: 300
- Website: www.darulhadis.org.uk

Darul Hadis Latifiah (Arabic: دار الحديث لطيفية), formerly known as Madrasah-e-Darul Qirat Majidiah (Arabic: المدرسة دار القراءات المجيدية), is a secondary (11–20 age range) boys, Islamic, private school and sixth form in Bethnal Green, Greater London, England. It achieved the status of a secondary school in 1999. Parents and community leaders under the guidance of Abdul Latif Chowdhury (Fultali Saheb) led the initial foundation of the madrasa in 1978.

== History ==
Madrasah-e-Darul Qirat Majidiah was established in 1978 by parents and community leaders under the guidance of Abdul Latif Chowdhury Fultali, who named it after his father Shah Abdul Majid Chowdhury. Classes were originally held at a rented property in New Road, London, E1. Through private donations local community leaders raised funds to buy a property in 1981 at 46-48 Cannon Street Road, London, E1 0BH. The present building at 1 Cornwall Avenue, London, E2 0HW was purchased in 2005.

The original madrasa delivered Bengali and Qur'anic classes, on average to students; in excess of 200 and aged between 5 and 16. The classes were weekdays from 5 pm to 7 pm, and weekends from 10 am to 1 pm.

In 1998, the institution was renamed Darul Hadis Latifiah, after its founder, and subsequently established as a secondary school and college, where students receive a full secondary education in line with the National Curriculum as well as being educated in Islamic Studies, Bengali and Urdu.

== See also ==
- Badedeorail Fultali Kamil Madrasa
