= Tasnim Jara =

Bangladeshi politician, physician, and entrepreneur

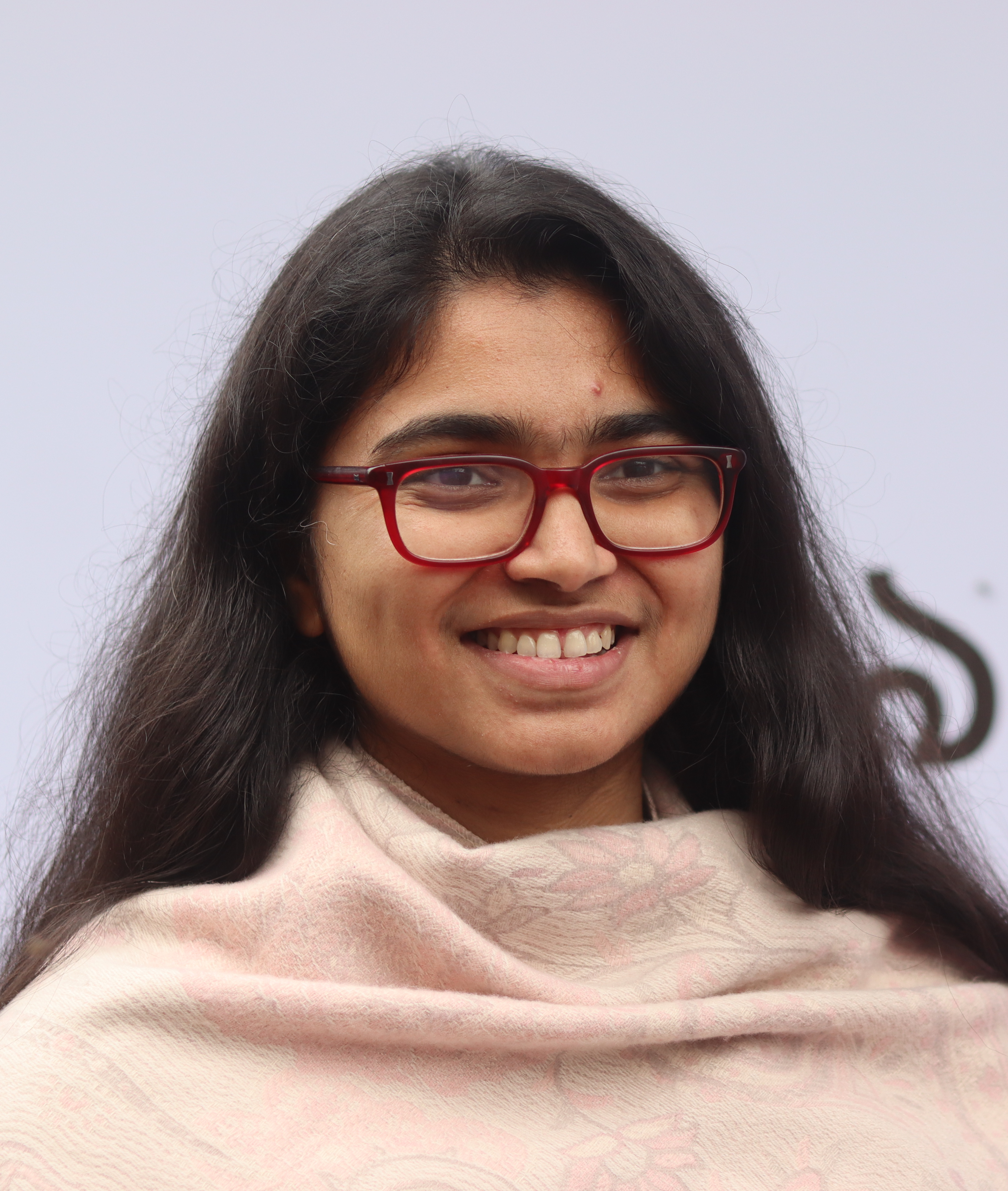
- Jara in 2025

1st Senior Joint Member Secretary of National Citizen Party
- In office 28 February 2025 – 27 December 2025 Serving with Nahida Sarwar Niva
- Convener: Nahid Islam
- Member Secretary: Akhter Hossain
- Preceded by: Post established

Personal details
- Born: 7 October 1994 (age 31) Dhaka, Bangladesh
- Party: Independent
- Other political affiliations: National Citizen Party (2025)
- Spouse: Khaled Saifullah (m. 2016)
- Education: University of Oxford
- Occupation: Physician, politician, entrepreneur
- Website: tasnimjara.com

YouTube information
- Channel: Tasnim Jara
- Years active: 2020–present
- Genre: Medical
- Subscribers: 4.9 million
- Views: 460 million
- Last updated: 27 December 2025

Tasnim Jara (Bengali: তাসনিম জারা; born 7 October 1994) is a Bangladeshi physician, researcher, entrepreneur, social media personality and politician, who has formerly served as the Senior Joint Member Secretary of the National Citizen Party (NCP) before leaving the party in December 2025.

== Early life and education ==
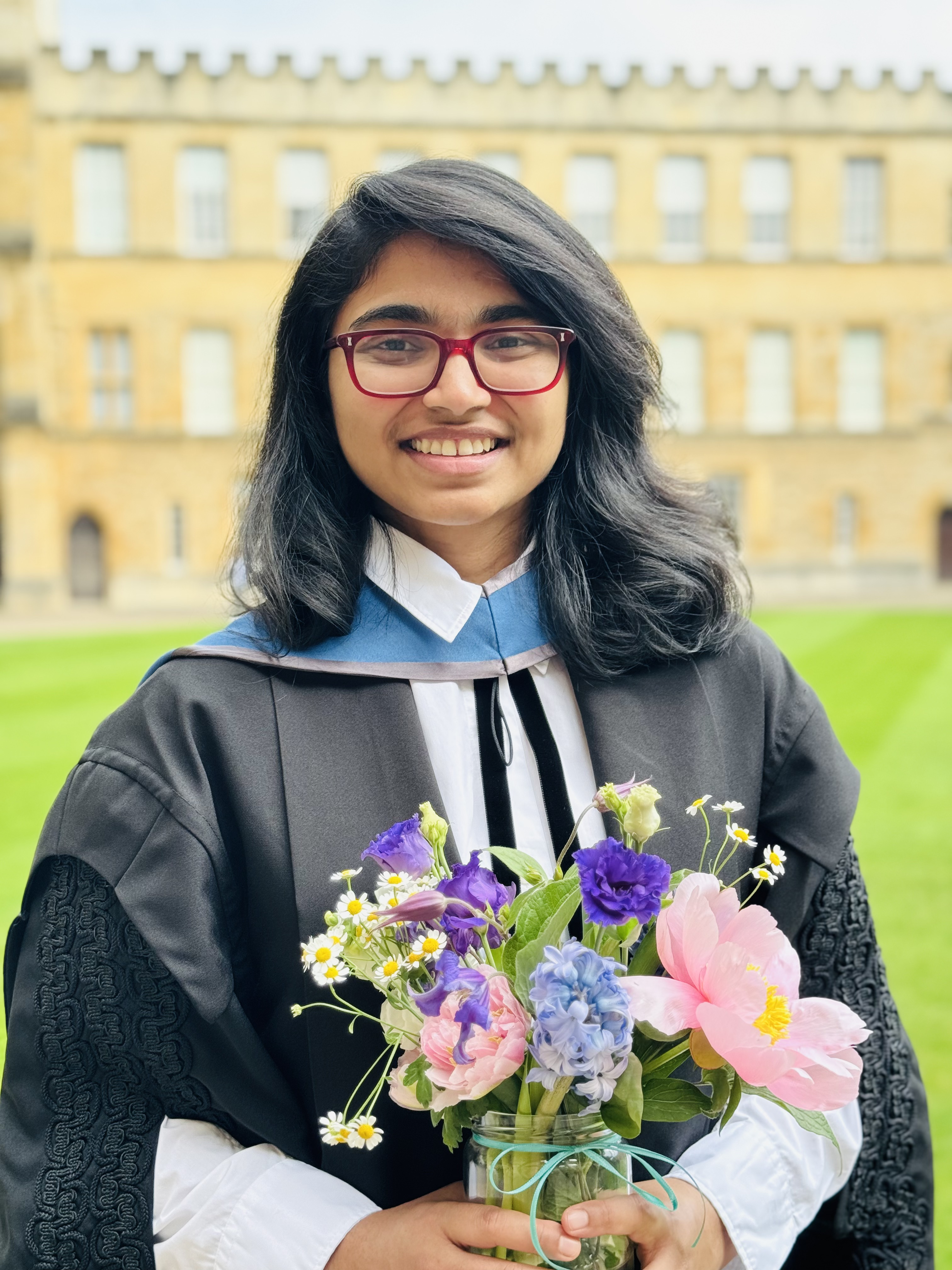
Jara at her University Graduation Ceremony

Tasnim Jara was born and raised in Dhaka, Bangladesh. She completed her Higher Secondary Education at Viqarunnisa Noon School and College. She studied medicine at Dhaka Medical College, where she received her MBBS degree. She later completed a Master's in Evidence-Based Health Care at the University of Oxford.

== Career ==
Jara began her medical career at Dhaka Medical College Hospital. In 2019, she moved to the United Kingdom and worked as an emergency medicine doctor within the NHS.

Since 2021, Jara has been an internal medicine resident at Cambridge University Hospitals. Alongside clinical practice, she has been involved in undergraduate medical education at the University of Cambridge, where she has served as a clinical supervisor.

Jara co-founded Shohay Health, a digital platform providing health information to Bengali-speaking communities. In 2023, she contributed to the development of the Shohay Pregnancy app, which offers week-by-week pregnancy guidance tailored to users in Bangladesh.

As a researcher, she has co-authored articles published in international peer-reviewed journals, including JACC: Cardiovascular Interventions and Frontiers in Global Women's Health.

=== Political career ===
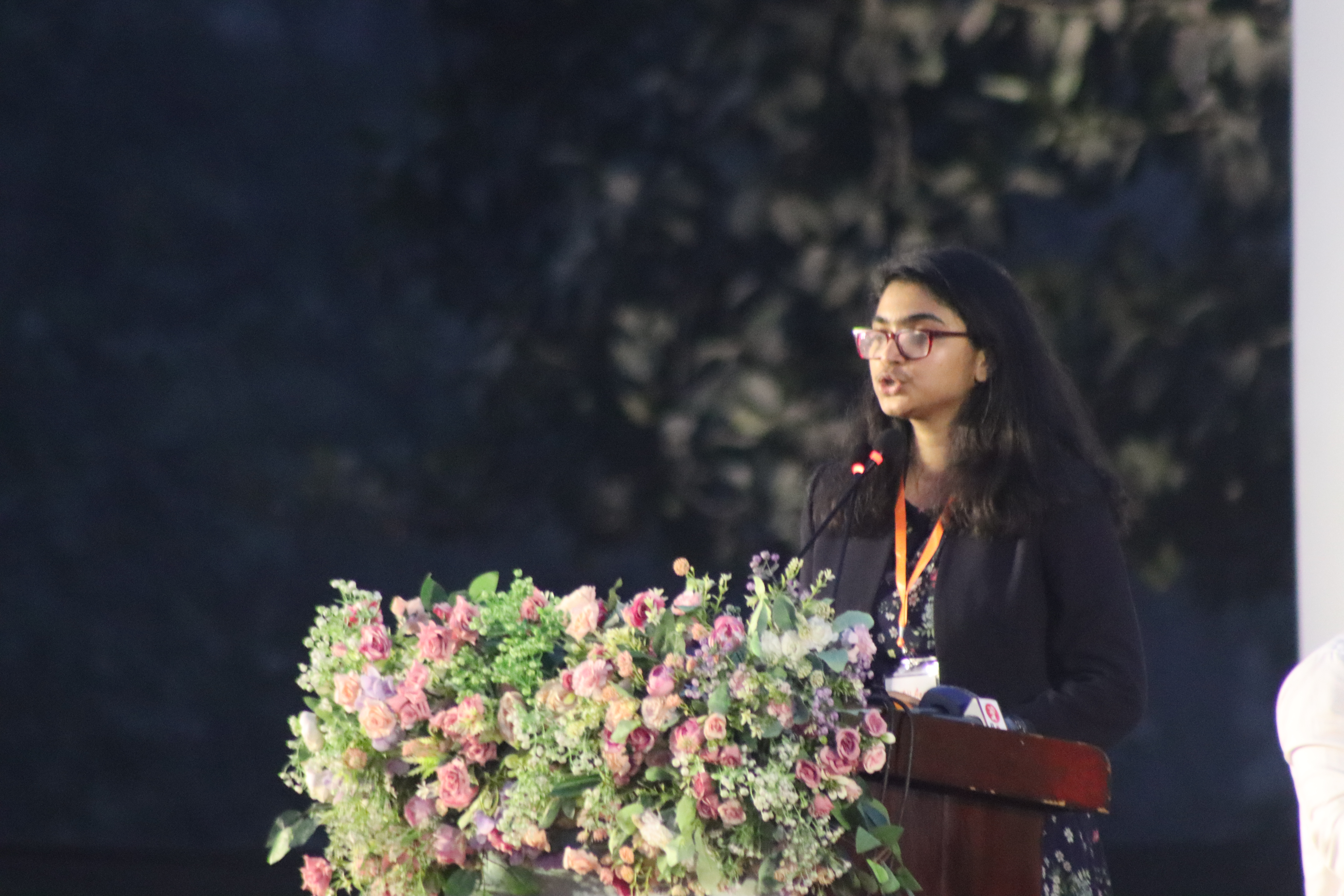
Jara delivering speech in the NCP inauguration ceremony on 28 February 2025

Jara became involved in politics in 2024 through the Jatiya Nagorik Committee (JNC), a citizens' coalition formed after the July uprising. She contributed to establishing the committee's diaspora wing before taking a leadership position in the subsequently formed National Citizen Party (NCP).

As Senior Joint Member Secretary, she was also part of the NCP's Political Council, a ten-member executive body referred to by The Daily Star as the "Super 10."

In her political role, she has publicly advocated for transparency and accountability within the party, including raising concerns about financial disclosures by senior officials.

On December 27, 2025, she resigned from her post as senior joint secretary from NCP.

Jara contested in 2026 general election from Dhaka-9 constituency and lost.

== Activism and social work ==
In 2014, she was elected President of the United Nations Youth Advisory Panel in Bangladesh, advising the United Nations on youth engagement and policy development.

In December 2016, Jara received media attention for her choice of bridal attire. At her wedding reception in Dhaka, she wore a cotton sari inherited from her grandmother, without traditional jewelry or makeup. This decision was reported by several news outlets as a statement against societal pressures on women and generated public discussion.

She has also expressed support for mental health education in schools as a means to address stigma and improve access to care.

At the onset of the COVID-19 pandemic, she began producing Bengali-language health-related videos on social media. Her content, covering topics such as COVID-19 prevention, vaccination education, reproductive health, and mental wellness, has received international media attention, including Financial Times and ITV.

== Recognition and awards ==
In 2021, Jara was featured in a photo mosaic "The Luminaries" created by UK based photography and design studio The People's Picture unveiled at the G7 Global Vaccine Confidence Summit.

Bangladeshi media outlet, The Business Standard, have named her as a "changemaker" in 2021, citing her use of digital platforms to address medical misinformation during the COVID-19 pandemic.

== Personal life ==
Tasnim Jara is married to Khaled Saifullah, a Bangladeshi tech entrepreneur and human rights activist. Saifullah studied human rights law at the University of Oxford and also held a leadership role in the National Citizen Party alongside Jara.
