= Islamic Arabic University =

Public university in Dhaka, Bangladesh

- ইসলামি আরবি বিশ্ববিদ্যালয়
- Other name: IAU
- Type: Public
- Established: 2013; 13 years ago
- Affiliations: University Grants Commission (Bangladesh)
- Chancellor: President Mohammed Shahabuddin
- Vice-Chancellor: Professor Dr. Mohammad Abu Zafar Khan (17 March, 2026-present)
- Location: Mohammadpur Thana, Dhaka District, Bangladesh; 23.7443°N 90.3492°E
- Campus: Urban
- Website: iau.edu.bd
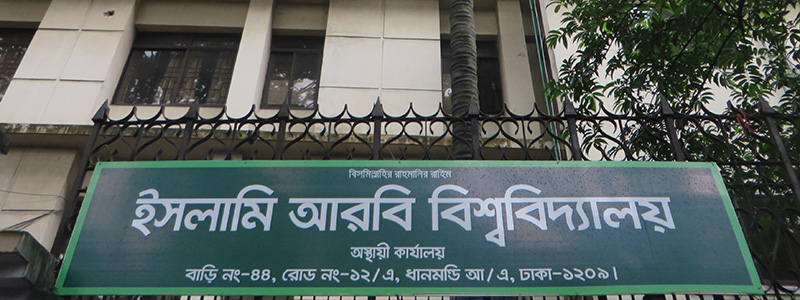

Islamic Arabic University (Bengali: ইসলামি আরবি বিশ্ববিদ্যালয়) is a public university in Mohammadpur Thana of Dhaka, Bangladesh. It operates through a number of fazil (bachelor) and kamil (master) level madrasahs all over Bangladesh instead of a localized campus.

The Islamic Arabic University was authorized by passage in Parliament on 18 September 2013 of the Islamic Arabic University Bill. It supervises all 1,500 fazil (bachelor) and kamil (master) level madrasas in Bangladesh. Initially it was located at the Bangladesh Madrasah Teachers' Training Institute in Gazipur.

== See also ==
- List of Islamic educational institutions
