= Bangladesh Madrasah Education Board =

Government agency

- বাংলাদেশ মাদ্রাসা শিক্ষা বোর্ড; Alia Madrasah Education Board

Board overview
- Formed: 1979; 47 years ago
- Jurisdiction: Government of Bangladesh
- Headquarters: 2 Orphanage Road, Baksibazar, Dhaka
- Board executives: Prof. Muhammad Shah Alamgir, Chairman; Prof. Saleh Ahmad, Registrar
- Parent department: Ministry of Education
- Website: bmeb.gov.bd

Bangladesh Madrasah Education Board (Bengali: বাংলাদেশ মাদ্রাসা শিক্ষা বোর্ড) or Alia Madrasah Education Board started its activity independently in 1979. With the passage of time in Bangladeshi madrasah education several amendments have come to pass. In 1978 humanities and science faculties were included at the Alim (عالِم) level. In 1980 Fazil (فاضل) degrees were granted the same standard of education as Higher Secondary School Certificate (HSC) degrees but this was changed in later years with Dakhil (داخل) level having the equivalency of Secondary School Certificate (SSC) since 1985, and Alim being considered as the HSC equivalent since 1987.

Humanities, science, business and technical education has been included with madrasah education. Meanwhile, a law has been passed for Fazil and Kamil (کامل) levels to be considered equivalent with bachelor's and master's degrees in general education.

== Background ==
Alia Madrasah was established in Calcutta in 1780 by the East India Company through Headteacher Majduddin and this later formed the Madrasah Education Board of Bengal. Madrasah education was then started formally. Late A. K. Fazlul Huqdeclared in a prize giving ceremony in Aliah University in 1939, "I want the spread of Madrasah Education and itshould be modernized and an Islamic Arabic University should be established".

To materialize this declaration of sher-E-Bangla a committee named Moula Box was formed. This committee advises on the development of madrasah education. In 1947, after the independence of Pakistan, many commissions were formed for the development of madrasah education. Among them in 1949 the "West Bengal Educational System Reconstruction Committee" was formed and in 1963-64 the name of Arabic University was mentioned.

In 1971, after the independence of Bangladesh, steps were taken for the modernization of madrasah education. Bengali, mathematics, English, social science, general science were made compulsory. In 1978 the Madrasah Education Board was formed under Ordinance for the Modernization of Madrasah Education. The board has faced difficulties in recruiting teachers for science related classes. In 2017 Bangladesh government removed references to Jihad from books of Madrasah Education Board.

== See also ==
- Qawmi
- Education in Bangladesh
- Al-Haiatul Ulya Lil-Jamiatil Qawmia Bangladesh
- Bangladesh Qawmi Madrasah Education Board
- Islam in Bangladesh
- Religious education
- Charity school
- List of Islamic seminaries
