= Nalchity Upazila =

Nalchity নলছিটি
- Upazila
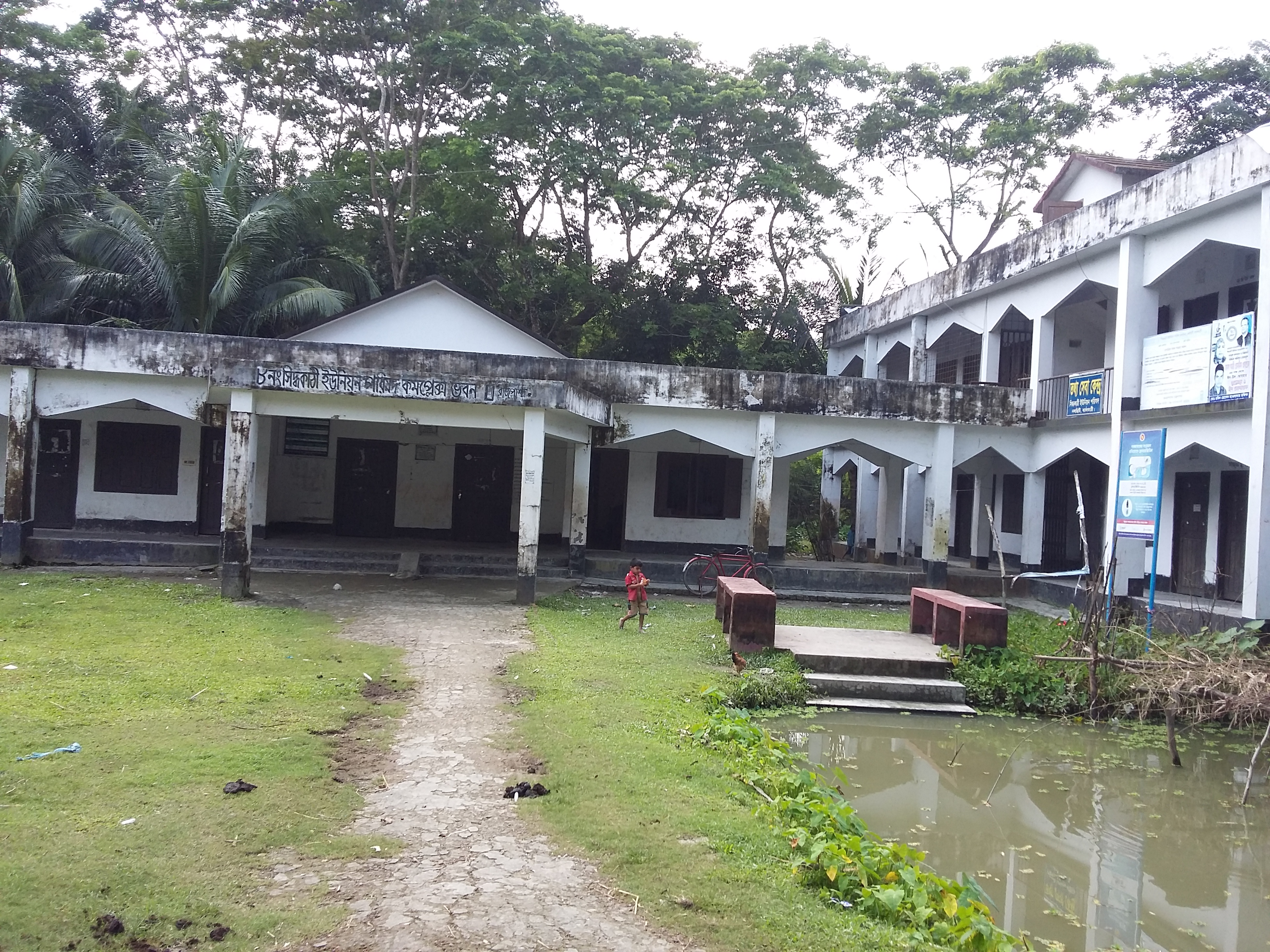
- 8 no. Siddhakathi Union Parishad Complex Building, Nalchity upazia

- Coordinates: 22°37.3′N 90°16.2′E
- Country: Bangladesh
- Division: Barisal Division
- District: Jhalakati District

Area
  - Total: 231.42 km^{2} (89.35 sq mi)

Population (2022)
  - Total: 186,892
  - Density: 807.59/km^{2} (2,091.6/sq mi)
- Time zone: UTC+6 (BST)
- Postal code: 8420
- Area code: 04953
- Website: Official Map of the Nalchity Upazila

Nalchity (Bengali: নলছিটি) is an upazila of Jhalokati District in Barisal Division, Bangladesh.

== History ==
Long prior to this administrative arrangement, Nalchiti had already attained prominence as the principal commercial hub of the region. Contemporary accounts and subsequent scholarly assessments indicate that the area witnessed a steady influx of foreign merchants from diverse lands, reflecting its importance within wider networks of trade. Notably, Chinese traders are understood to have played a significant role in the commerce of salt and betel nut in this locality. Material and toponymic traces of their presence are commonly identified by researchers in the present-day China Bazar of Nalchiti and in the Chinese grave situated near the bus stand.

Some family members of Isa Khan moved from Sarail to Nalchity. Abdul Ghani Khan, a 14th-generation descendant of Isa Khan, is the current head of this branch of the family. The region later became a free looting field and slave trading zone for Magh and Portuguese pirates. In 1654, the Mughal prince Shah Shuja built two forts (Andar Qila and Bahir Qila) in one night in the village of Shujabad to better control the region, and to counter piracy. One was built with mud, and the other with bricks. The ruins of the forts, known as Bhutergarh, are visible from the Barisal-Jhalokati highway. The nearby Mallikpur Jame Mosque is also attributed to Prince Shah Shuja. Another historical site in Nalchity is the ancient Amirabad Khan Bari Mosque established by Khuda Nawaz Khan, and this is rooted in the oral Barisailla folklore tradition due to its connection with the Barisailla legends of Asman Singh of Shujabad.

In 1924, the British authorities established a thana (police administrative headquarters) in Nalchity. The headquarters of Backergunge District was first located in Baraikaran, Nalchity.

The Ponabalia Massacre occurred on 7 March 1927. Twenty Muslim worshippers were killed when the Brigade of Gurkhas, acting under the orders of District Magistrate E. N. Blandy, opened fire at the newly constructed Kulkathi Jame Mosque. The incident sparked widespread mourning across Backergunge, and the martyrs were subsequently interred near the mosque. Contemporary press coverage highlighted the atrocity, and Sher-e-Bangla A. K. Fazlul Huq publicly condemned the Magistrate as 'Bloody Blandy'. Following legal proceedings, families of the martyrs received compensation, and the Kulkathi mosque and graveyard were renovated. In memory of the victims, the local school was renamed Kulkathi Shahidia Secondary School.

During the Bangladesh War of Independence of 1971, the Pakistan Army shot down 13 Bengalis on 13 May. In midnight on 30 June, pro-independence Bengali militants raided the Nalchity Police Station and a fighter, Yunus of Baraiqaran was killed in the clash. The Chachair Battle fought in November 1971 stands as one of the fiercest engagements in southern Bengal. A Mukti Bahini camp at Chachair School, Nalchity, came under attack when Pakistani forces, led by Captain Azmat, advanced on 13 November. Under the command of Captain Shahjahan Omar, the freedom fighters, including local leaders and reinforcements from Barisal and Patuakhali, launched a coordinated counterattack. The battle, which continued until late evening, resulted in significant casualties among Pakistani troops and Razakars, including a Baloch commander. A retaliatory attack on 14 November was repelled by the Mukti Bahini, marking Chachair as the final frontal engagement of Pakistani forces in the area. Nalchity was captured on 8 December. Nalchity Thana was upgraded to an upazila (sub-district) in 1983 as part of President of Bangladesh Hussain Muhammad Ershad's decentralisation programme.

Nalchi Upazila is the second municipality of Bangladesh.

== Geography ==
Nalchity is located at 22.6222°N 90.2708°E. It has a total area of 231.42 km^{2}.

== Demographics ==
Religions in Nalchity Upazila (2022)
Religion	Percent
Islam	95.64%
Hinduism	4.31%
Other or not stated	0.05%

According to the 2022 Bangladeshi census, Nalchity Upazila had 44,524 households and a population of 186,892. 9.38% of the population were under 5 years of age. Nalchity had a literacy rate (age 7 and over) of 83.29%: 84.06% for males and 82.60% for females, and a sex ratio of 90.97 males for every 100 females. 34,316 (18.36%) lived in urban areas.

According to the 2011 Census of Bangladesh, Nalchity Upazila had 43,066 households and a population of 193,556. 43,364 (22.40%) were under 10 years of age. Nalchity has a literacy rate (age 7 and over) of 67.2%, compared to the national average of 51.8%, and a sex ratio of 1051 females per 1000 males. 30,805 (15.92%) lived in urban areas.

According to the 1991 Bangladesh census, Nalchity had a population of 203,563. Males constituted 50.02% of the population, and females 49.98%. The population aged 18 or over was 100,836. Nalchity had an average literacy rate of 47.1% (7+ years), compared to the national average of 32.4%.

== Administration ==
Nalchity Upazila is divided into Nalchity Municipality and ten union parishads: Bhairabpasha, Dapdapia, Kulkati, Kusanghal, Mollahat, Magar, Nachan Mohal, Ranapasha, Siddhakati, and Subidpur. The union parishads are subdivided into 118 mauzas and 138 villages.

Nalchity Municipality is subdivided into 9 wards and 21 mahallas.

The current mayor of Nalchity is Wahed Kabir Khan while the MP of the region is Amir Hossain Amu (2024). Salah Uddin Khan Salim is the Upazila Chairman. The upazila is part of the 4 sub-districts of Jhalakati Zilla Parishad. The current elected chairman of the Zilla Parishad is Adv. Khan Saifullah Panir.

== Tourist attraction ==
- Mallikpur Jame Mosque

== Notable people ==
- Mokim Hossain Howlader (died 1973), politician
- Shamsuddin Abul Kalam (1926-1997), actor and author
- Zulfiker Ali Bhutto (died 2000), politician
- Abul Maqsud Harun-ar-Rashid (1933-2021), physicist and academic
- Golam Mustafa (1934-2003), actor
- Amir Hossain Amu (born 1940), former minister of industries and Grand Alliance coordinator
- Osman Hadi (1997-2025), politician and convener of Inqilab Moncho
- Israt Sultana Elen Bhutto, politician

== See also ==
- Upazilas of Bangladesh
- Districts of Bangladesh
- Divisions of Bangladesh
