= A. M. Harun-ar-Rashid =

Bangladeshi physicist (1933–2021)

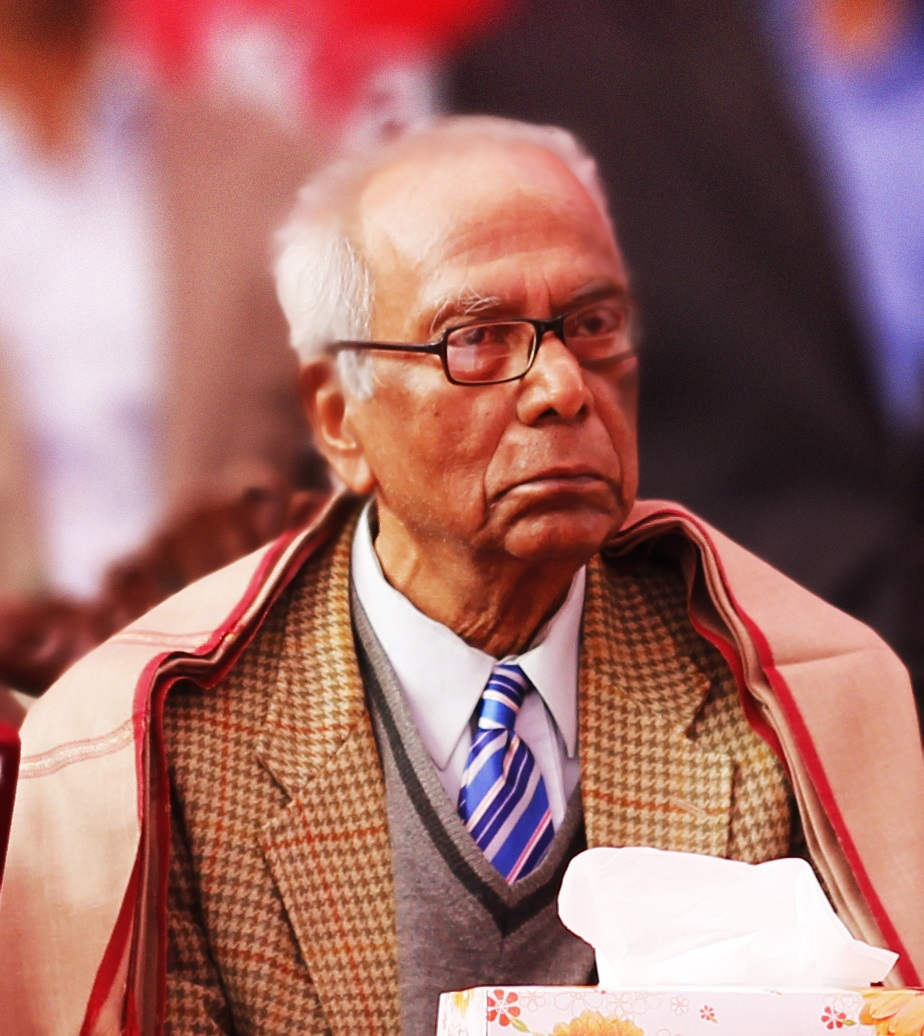
- Rashid in 2015
- Born: 1 May 1933; Barisal district, Bengal Presidency, British India
- Died: 9 October 2021 (aged 88); Dhaka, Bangladesh
- Education: University of Glasgow
- Relatives: Shamsuddin Abul Kalam (maternal uncle)
- Scientific career
- Fields: Physics
- Workplaces: University of Dhaka; University of Texas at Austin; University of California, Los Angeles; University of Islamabad
- Thesis: Low energy K-meson-nucleon scattering and elastic scattering and the elastic scattering of pions by alpha-particles (1961)
- Doctoral advisor: B. H. Bransden

Abul Maqsud Harun-ar-Rashid (1 May 1933 – 9 October 2021) was a Bangladeshi physicist and professor of physics at the University of Dhaka. He was the nephew of actor and writer Shamsuddin Abul Kalam.

== Early life and education ==
Harun-ar-Rashid was born on 1 May 1933 into a Bengali Muslim family in the village of Bahadurpur in Nalchity, Jhalokathi, then part of the Backergunge District of the Bengal Presidency. His father, Maqsud Ali, was the first person from the area to obtain postgraduate education in science.

Harun-ar-Rashid earned his BSc and MSc in physics from the University of Dhaka in 1953 and 1954, respectively. He completed his PhD in theoretical physics from the University of Glasgow in 1960.

While pursuing his doctoral studies at the University of Glasgow, Harun-ar-Rashid participated in the 1960 Scottish Universities’ Summer School on dispersion relations. The school included lectures by physicists such as Geoffrey Chew, J. Hamilton, and Walter Thirring.

== Career ==
Harun-ar-Rashid joined the Department of Physics at the University of Dhaka as a lecturer. He became a full professor in 1972. He founded the Department of Theoretical Physics at the University of Dhaka in 1975 and later served as its chairman. In 1993, he was named Bose Professor of Physics.

From 1967 to 1971, he served as professor of theoretical physics and director of the Institute of Physics at the University of Islamabad.

In January 1967, an International Seminar on Low-Energy Nuclear Physics was held in Dacca (now Dhaka) under the auspices of the Pakistan Atomic Energy Commission. Among the invited participants were Abdus Salam, Brian R. Mottelson, Rudolf Hübner, Walter D. Allen, Dennis E. Alburger, and John B. French. Harun-ar-Rashid, along with Anwar Hossain and Mizanul Islam, later edited the conference proceedings, which were published as Nuclear Structure: Based on Lectures Given at the International Seminar on Low-Energy Nuclear Physics Held at Dacca, 16–25 January 1967 by North-Holland Publishing Company.

In the late 1960s, Harun-ar-Rashid was among the pioneering members of the theoretical physics group at the University of Islamabad (later Quaid-i-Azam University), a research-oriented program inspired by Abdus Salam. Following the independence of Bangladesh, he returned to Dhaka in 1971–72.

He served as the director of the Computer Centre (now the Institute of Information Technology, University of Dhaka) at the University of Dhaka.

He was a visiting professor at the Institute für Theoretische Kernphysik, the International Centre for Theoretical Physics, Imperial College London, the University of Texas at Austin, and the University of California, Los Angeles.

He served as a senior scientific officer and principal scientific officer at the Bangladesh Atomic Energy Commission from 1962 to 1967. He also served as vice-president of the Asiatic Society of Bangladesh from 1992 to 1993.

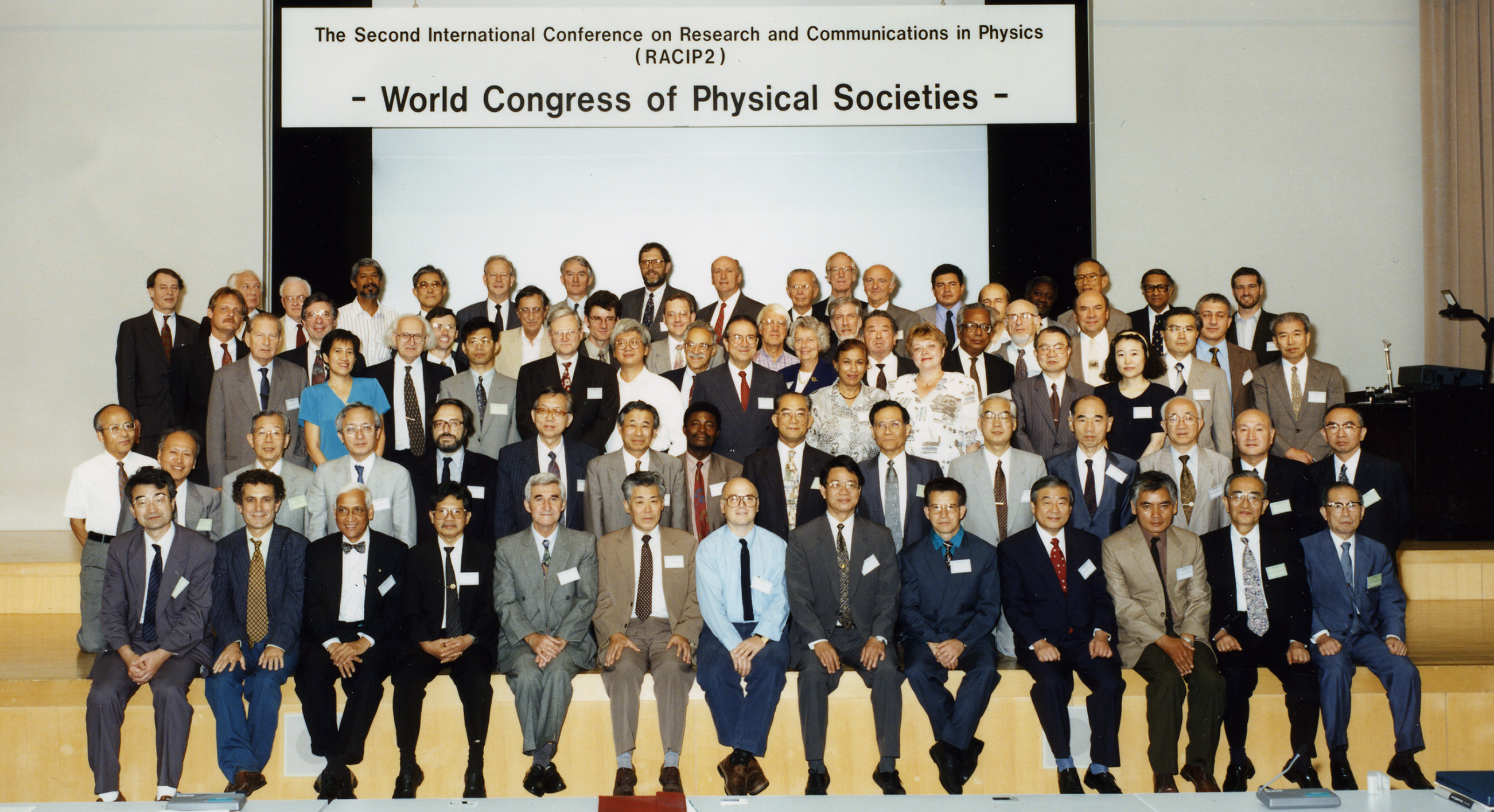
Rashid at the Second International Conference on Research and Communications in Physics

Harun-ar-Rashid was one of the signatories of the 1992 World Scientists' Warning to Humanity.

== Honors and awards ==
- Ekushey Padak (1991)
- Independence Day Award (1999)
- Raja Kalinarayan Scholarship awarded by the University of Dhaka
- Best Science Writer Award by the Government of Bangladesh (2005)
- Star Lifetime Award on Physics (2016)

== Recognition ==
A memorial session titled "Professor A. M. Harun ar Rashid Memorial Session" was held at the International Conference on the Centennial Celebration of Bose–Einstein Statistics (2024).
