= Jhalokati-2 =

Constituency of Bangladesh's Jatiya Sangsad

Coordinates: 22.64°N 90.20°E

- Constituency for the Jatiya Sangsad
- District: Jhalokati District
- Division: Barisal Division
- Electorate: 365,397 (2026)

Current constituency
- Created: 1984
- Party: Bangladesh Nationalist Party
- Member: Israt Sultana Elen Bhutto
- ← 125 Jhalokati-1 127 Pirojpur-1 →

Jhalokati-2 is a constituency represented in the Jatiya Sangsad (National Parliament) of Bangladesh since 2026 by Israt Sultana Elen Bhutto of the Bangladesh Nationalist Party.

== Boundaries ==
The constituency encompasses Jhalokati Sadar and Nalchity upazilas.

== History ==
The constituency was created in 1984 from a Bakerganj constituency when the former Bakerganj District was split into four districts: Bhola, Bakerganj, Jhalokati, and Pirojpur.

== Members of Parliament ==
Election	Member	Party
1986	Zulfiker Ali Bhutto	Jatiya Party
1991	Gazi Aziz Ferdous	Bangladesh Nationalist Party
Feb 1996	Gazi Aziz Ferdous	Bangladesh Nationalist Party
Jun 1996	Zulfiker Ali Bhutto	Jatiya Party
2000 by-election	Amir Hossain Amu	Awami League
2001	Israt Sultana Elen Bhutto	Bangladesh Nationalist Party
2008	Amir Hossain Amu	Awami League
2026	Israt Sultana Elen Bhutto	Bangladesh Nationalist party

== Elections ==
=== Elections in the 2020s ===
General Election 2026: Jhalokati-2
Party	Candidate	Votes	%	±%
BNP	Israt Sultana Elen Bhutto	113,419	53.5	N/A
Jamaat	S M Neamul Karim	70,556	33.3	N/A
IAB	Sirazul Islam Sirazi	24,543	11.6	N/A
Independent	Syed Razzak Ali	3,125	1.5	N/A
GOP	Md. Mahmudul Islam Sagar	212	0.1	N/A
NPP	Forkan Hossain	127	0.1	N/A
JSD (Rab)	Masud Parvez	105	0.0	N/A
Independent	Md. Nuruddin Sardar	77	0.0	N/A
Majority		42,863	20.2	N/A
Turnout		212,164	58.1	N/A
BNP gain from AL				

=== Elections in the 2010s ===
Amir Hossain Amu was re-elected unopposed in the 2014 general election after opposition parties withdrew their candidacies in a boycott of the election.

=== Elections in the 2000s ===
General Election 2008: Jhalokati-2
Party	Candidate	Votes	%	±%
AL	Amir Hossain Amu	104,444	56.5	+21.9
BNP	Israt Sultana Elen Bhutto	73,851	40.0	−18.5
IAB	Muhammad Fokrul Islam	6,407	3.5	N/A
Majority		30,593	16.6	−7.4
Turnout		184,702	84.4	+18.8
AL gain from BNP				

General Election 2001: Jhalokati-2
Party	Candidate	Votes	%	±%
BNP	Israt Sultana Elen Bhutto	92,116	58.5	+28.2
AL	Amir Hossain Amu	54,378	34.6	+9.2
IJOF	Syed Md. Anowar Hossain	10,164	6.5	N/A
JSD	Dulal Saha	234	0.1	N/A
CPB	Abdul Mannan	135	0.1	−0.1
Independent	Syed Moazzem Hussain	101	0.1	N/A
Bangladesh Progressive Party	Abu Syed Molla	81	0.1	N/A
Jatiya Party (M)	Majibur Rahman	70	0.0	N/A
Independent	Gazi Aziz Ferdous	61	0.0	N/A
Majority		37,738	24.0	+17.3
Turnout		157,340	65.5	−9.3
BNP hold				

Zulfiker Ali Bhutto died in May 2000, his widow, Amir Hossain Amu was elected in a July 2000 by-election, defeating Israt Sultana Elen Bhutto.

=== Elections in the 1990s ===
General Election June 1996: Jhalokati-2
Party	Candidate	Votes	%	±%
JP(E)	Zulfiker Ali Bhutto	47,050	37.0	+9.8
BNP	Gazi Aziz Ferdous	38,523	30.3	−6.1
AL	Md. Saeed Anwar Hossain	32,245	25.4	−0.3
IOJ	Golam Mostofa Khan	5,786	4.6	+0.7
Jamaat	Haider Hossain	1,684	1.3	−0.8
Samridhya Bangladesh Andolan	Ali Azim Khan	826	0.7	N/A
Zaker Party	S. M. Fazlul Haque	374	0.3	−0.1
CPB	Abdul Mannan	291	0.2	N/A
Independent	Mozammel Hossain	229	0.2	N/A
NDP	A. K. M. Golam Rabbani	30	0.0	−0.1
Majority		8,527	6.7	−2.5
Turnout		127,038	74.8	+30.3
JP(E) gain from BNP				

General Election 1991: Jhalokati-2
Party	Candidate	Votes	%	±%
BNP	Gazi Aziz Ferdous	43,673	36.4	
JP(E)	Zulfiker Ali Bhutto	32,639	27.2	
AL	Amir Hossain Amu	30,808	25.7	
IOJ	Syed Md. Mosaddeque Millah	4,715	3.9	
Jamaat	Haider Hossain	2,507	2.1	
Bangladesh Janata Party	Faruk Ahmed	1,897	1.6	
Jatiya Biplobi Front	Altaf Hossain Mollah	860	0.7	
Independent	A. Aziz	630	0.5	
Bangladesh Muslim League (Kader)	Abu Bakar Siddique	599	0.5	
Zaker Party	Mostafizur Rahman	474	0.4	
BAKSAL	Akkas H Sarker	405	0.3	
Independent	Kari Md. Shahjahan	291	0.2	
Jatiya Samajtantrik Dal-JSD	A. S. M. Isha	268	0.2	
NDP	Lutfar Rahman	116	0.1	
Majority		11,034	9.2	
Turnout		119,882	44.2	
BNP gain from JP(E)				
