= Amir Hossain Amu =

Bangladeshi politician

- আমির হোসেন আমু
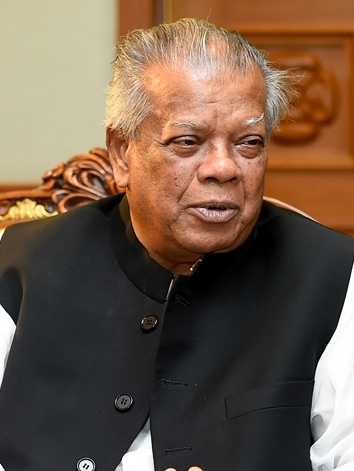
- Amu in 2015

Minister of Industries
- In office 14 January 2014 – December 2019
- Prime Minister: Sheikh Hasina
- Preceded by: Dilip Barua
- Succeeded by: Nurul Majid Mahmud Humayun

Member of the Bangladesh Parliament for Jhalokati-2
- In office 25 January 2009 – 6 August 2024
- Preceded by: Israt Sultana Elen Bhutto

Minister of Food
- In office 29 December 1999 – 15 July 2001
- Prime Minister: Sheikh Hasina
- Preceded by: A. Z. M. Naziruddin

Advisory Council Member of Bangladesh Awami League
- Incumbent
- Assumed office 1 January 2022

Personal details
- Born: 1 January 1940 (age 86) Jhalokati District, Barishal Division, Bangladesh.
- Party: Bangladesh Awami League
- Relatives: Sheikh family of Tungipara (in-laws)
- Education: University of Dhaka

Amir Hossain Amu (Bengali: আমির হোসেন আমু; born 1 January 1940) is a Bangladeshi Politician and Lawyer. He was a Member of Parliament representing the Jhalokati-2 constituency. He also served as the Minister of Food in 1st Hasina Cabinet and Minister of Industries in 2nd Hasina Cabinet. He was the Coordinator and Spokesman for the Awami League-led 14-party Grand Alliance.

== Birth and education ==
Amu was born on 1 January 1940 in Jhalakathi subdivision of Barisal district. His father Mohammad Moazzem Hossain and mother Aklima Khatun. He obtained a BA from Barisal BM College in 1965 and an LLB from Barisal Law College in 1968. He earned a graduation degree in history from the University of Dhaka.

== Career ==
Amu contested the general election in 1991 from Jhalokati-2 as a candidate of the Awami League but came third after Gazi Aziz Ferdous of the Bangladesh Nationalist Party and Zulfiker Ali Bhutto of the Jatiya Party. He had received 30,808 while the winner had received 43,673 votes.

Amu contested the general election in 2001 from Jhalokati-2 as a candidate of the Awami League but lost to Israt Sultana Elen Bhutto of the Bangladesh Nationalist Party. He had received 54,378 votes while she had received 92,116 votes.

On 23 July 2003, Amu's house in Jhalokati District was vandalized by Bangladesh Nationalist Party activists who destroyed the boundary, door, and windows of the house. In December 2003, he failed to address a rally in Munshiganj district marking the triennial council of the party due to road blocks by activists of the governing Bangladesh Nationalist Party.

Amu was injured in the August 2004 Dhaka grenade attack which was an attempted assassination of former prime minister Sheikh Hasina at a rally of the Awami League.

When party president Sheikh Hasina was exiled by the caretaker government of Bangladesh (2006–08), Amu became one of top leaders who preserved and represented the party in her absence. However, he also developed differences with Hasina, criticising her for making a pact with the Islamist Khelafat Majlish party despite the Awami League's policy of secularism, and not discussing it first with other party leaders. Sheikh Hasina in turn criticised Amu for appearing supportive of the caretaker government. Activists of Awami League opposed to reforms attacked followers of Amu at the party office in September 2007. He was removed from the newly reformed central committee of the Awami League in July 2009.

In 2008, Amu was elected to parliament from Jhalokati-2 as a candidate of the Awami League with 104,444 votes while his nearest rival Israt Sultana Elen Bhutto of the Bangladesh Nationalist Party received 73,851.

Amu was re-elected unopposed in the 2014 general election from Jhalokati-2 after opposition parties, including the Bangladesh Nationalist Party, withdrew their candidacies in a boycott of the general election. He was appointed the minister of industries in the third Sheikh Hasina cabinet. He was against leasing land of state owned enterprises to private companies.

Amu represented Prime Minister Sheikh Hasina at the inauguration ceremony of Mamata Banerjee, chief minister of West Bengal, in 2016. In March 2017, a constable of Barisal Metropolitan Police was suspended for taking selfies with Amu while on duty protecting him. In August 2017, he spoke against Chief Justice Surendra Kumar Sinha for his comments against the government in a verdict which scrapped the 16th Amendment to the constitution of Bangladesh.

In 2018, Amu was elected to parliament from Jhalokati-2 as a candidate of the Awami League with 214,937 while his closest rival, Jeba Amina Khan of the Bangladesh Nationalist Party, received 5,982. He was not appointed a minister in the fourth Sheikh Hasina cabinet. In July 2020, Amu was appointed coordinator of the Awami League led 14-Party alliance.

In December 2022, Amu presided over a meeting of the Awami League led 14-Party alliance in which left wing parties in the alliance criticised the Awami League for ignoring their input. Amu reported that the government could not remove Islam as the state religion of Bangladesh due to internal opposition in the Awami League. He is a member of the Advisory Council of the Awami League.

On August 6, 2024, Bangladesh’s parliament was dissolved following the resignation and self-imposed exile of then-Prime Minister Sheikh Hasina. Consequently, Amu lost his parliamentary seat and went into seclusion. The next day, authorities reported the recovery of ৳50,000,000 in cash from Amu's residence in Jhalokathi after the property was set on fire by an unidentified mob. On August 17, the Bangladesh Financial Intelligence Unit froze all bank accounts associated with Amu and his daughter, Sumaiya Hossain. On November 6, Amu was apprehended by the Detective Branch of the Dhaka Metropolitan Police in the West Dhanmondi area of Dhaka. His home in Barisal was burned down and vandalized in February 2025.

== Personal life ==
Amu was married to Feroza Hossain. She died from cancer while under treatment at Mount Elizabeth Hospital, Singapore on 1 November 2007.
