= Shamsuddin Abul Kalam =

- শামসুদ্দিন আবুল কালাম
- Born: Abul Kalam Shamsuddin; 1926; Nalchity, Backergunge District, Bengal Presidency, British India
- Died: 10 January 1997 (aged 70–71); Rome, Italy
- Burial place: Cimitero di Prima Porta, Rome
- Education: Brajamohan College; University of Calcutta
- Spouse: Hosne Ara Biju
- Children: Camellia Mustafa
- Parents: Akram Ali Munshi (father); Meherunnessa Phulmeher (mother)
- Relatives: A. M. Harun-ar-Rashid (nephew)

Shamsuddin Abul Kalam (1926 – 10 January 1997) was an author of Bengali literature from Bangladesh. His most notable work is a novel, Kashboner Konya (1954). He was awarded the 1964 Bangla Academy Literary Award in the novel category. After his migration to Italy in 1959, he also worked on their film industry.

== Background and education ==
Abul Kalam Shamsuddin, known as Kanchan or Kanchu, was born in 1926 in the village of Kamdebpur in Nalchity, Jhalokathi, then part of Backergunge District of Bengal Presidency to Akram Ali Munshi and Meherunnessa Phulmeher. Munshi, a social worker, served as a chairman of the local union credit board and was an acquaintance of Sher-e-Bangla A. K. Fazlul Huq. Munshi was also credited for the construction of an 18-kilometer road from Nalchity to Chamta funded and built by the Backergunge District Board. His paternal grandfather, Zikirullah, descended from the leader Zahir of Kamdebpur. Samsuddin had four sisters, Jahanara Begum, Raushanara Begum, Mumtaz Begum, and Saida Akhtar. Since the Daily Azad editor, Abul Kalam Shamsuddin, had the same name, he adapted to Shamsuddin Abul Kalam in 1955.

Kalam completed his matriculation from Barishal Zilla School in 1941, Intermediate of Arts from Brajamohan College in 1943, and Bachelor of Arts from the University of Calcutta in 1946.

== Career ==
In the early 1940s, Kalam published short stories titled Shaherbanu. Politician Somnath Lahiri wrote a positive review of his work on Shwadhinota. In 1946, Kalam contributed three poems to a collection of poetry, Shaat-Shotero (trans. Seven-Seventeen), co-edited by Professor Shudhangshu Chowdhury, an academic at Brajamohan College.

Kalam was actively involved in the Indian independence movement as a student and was a member of the central committee of the Bengal Student Congress. After the partition in 1947, he initially stayed back in Calcutta. In 1950, Kalam came to Dhaka and joined as an assistant director to the News and Information Secretariat of the government of East Pakistan. He later became the editor of its publication, the Mahe Nao.

In 1953, Kalam published a new collection of stories, Poth Jana Nai and Dheu. Then, in 1955, it was an eight-story collection, Dui Hridoyer Teer, and another collection of twelve short stories, Puin Dalimer Kabya, in 1957.

Kalam's most notable work, a novel, Kashboner Konya, was written by 1948, and published in 1954.

Some of Kalam's works, including a novel written in English language, The Garden of Cane Fruits, have remained unpublished.

Kalam mostly wrote prose fiction which include Anek Diner Asha (1952), Dheu (1953), Path Jana Nai (1953), Dui Hrdayer Tir (1955), Shaher Banu (1957), and Puni Dalimer Kavya (1987). His notable novels were Alamnagarer Upakatha (1954), Kashboner Kanya (1954), Kavchanmala (1961), Jaijongol (1978), Kanchongram (1997).

Kalam permanently migrated to Italy in 1959. He was also involved in the liberation war of Bangladesh in 1971 from Italy. Rome University awarded him the DLitt degree. He produced several documentary films for UNESCO.

Kalam earned a diploma on film from Centro Sperimentale di Cinematografia in Rome. He spent considerable time abroad and played roles in several Italian films, including the role of a university teacher of Sardinia in Man and Wife (1970) along with Alberto Sordi. He was an associate of the film director Victor D Sheafer.

== Personal life and death ==
Kalam was married to Hosne Ara Biju. She was a graduate from Lady Brabourne College and the University of Dhaka, and later worked as a producer at All India Radio, Radio Pakistan, and Bangladesh Betar. They were divorced after their daughter, Camellia Mustafa (d. 2024), was born. Biju later married actor Golam Mustafa (1934–2003) and together she had her second daughter, Suborna Mustafa.

Kalam's nephew, A.M. Harun-ar-Rashid, was an Independence Day Award-winning physicist.

Kalam died on 10 January 1997 in Rome and buried in Cimitero di Prima Porta.

Kalam's Liberation War-based Kanchangram was published in 1998, a year after his death which earned the Bangladesh National Archives and Library award.

== Works ==
In his works, the rural life of Bengali people is seen widely. Emotion and romanticism are widely seen in his works.

=== Novels ===
- Kashboner Konya (The Girl in the Reeds, 1954)
- Dui Mahol (Two Mansions, 1955)
- Kanchonmala (The Gold Necklace, 1956)
- Jibon Kando (The Parts of Life, 1956)
- Jaijongol (The Wilderness, 1978)
- Somudrobasor (Coastal House, 1986)
- Nobanno (The Nobanno Ceremony, 1987)
- Jar Sathe Jar (Who Suits Whom, 1986)
- Moner Moto Thain (A Suitable Place, 1985)
- Kanchongram (The Golden Village, 1997)

=== Story collections ===
- Onek Diner Asha (Hopes of Many Days, 1952)
- Dheu (Waves, 1953)
- Path Jana Nai (Don't Know the Way, 1953)
- Dui Hridoyer Tir (1955)
- Saher Banu (1957)
