= Mallikpur Jame Mosque =

Mosque in Nalchity, Jhalokathi, Bangladesh

Religion
- Affiliation: Islam
- Branch/tradition: Sunni Islam

Location
- Location: Nalchity Upazila, Jhalokathi District, Bangladesh

Architecture
- Type: Mosque
- Style: Mughal architecture
- Completed: 1648

Specifications
- Dome: 1
- Materials: Lime and brick dust (Chun-surki)

Mallikpur Jame Mosque or Mughal Shah Shuja Mosque is an ancient Mughal-style mosque located in Nalchity Upazila of Jhalokathi District, Bangladesh. The mosque is also known as the Mughal Shah Shuja Mosque. It is approximately 400 years old and represents Mughal architectural heritage.

== Location ==
The mosque was built on the southern bank of the Sugandha River, which flows through Nalchity Upazila of Jhalokathi District. It is situated in Mallikpur village, beside the Nalchity–Barisal road, near Nalchity town.

== History ==
The mosque was constructed in Mallikpur during the reign of Mughal Subahdar Shah Shuja. It is believed to have been built in the mid-17th century. In 1648, piracy by Arakanese (Magh) and Portuguese raiders greatly increased in the coastal regions of Barisal. To counter the situation, the Mughal Emperor Shah Jahan sent his son Prince Shah Shuja as the Subahdar of Bengal. During his campaign against the pirates, Shuja constructed this mosque at the request of the local people.

The mosque holds historical importance and is considered a notable example of Mughal architecture. The year 1648 AD is inscribed on the mosque, indicating its construction date.

== Architecture ==
The mosque has a single dome. It is about 30 feet high, and the walls are 32 inches thick. The construction used lime and brick dust (chun-surki), a common material in Mughal-era buildings. Initially, about 30–35 worshippers could pray inside the mosque at once. Later, with the help of local residents, verandas were added on three sides, allowing nearly 100 people to pray together now.
