= New Paltan =

Coordinates: 23.7284°N 90.3806°E

New Paltan (Azimpur Natun Paltan in Dhaka City Corporation records) is near Dhaka's New Market in Azimpur. Several markets and a number of educational institutions (Dhaka University's Institute of Social Welfare and Research and arts faculty, Dhaka College, Government Laboratory High School, Dhaka City College and Eden Mohila College) are nearby. Border Guards Bangladesh headquarters is in neighbouring Pilkhana.

== Location ==
New Paltan is situated within the bigger area known as Azimpur within the Police Station Lalbagh. The locality is butted and bounded by, on the North-Headquarters of BGB, previously known as EPR, during 1947–1971, East Pakistan Civil Armed Forces (EPCAF), during 1971 and then BDR after the independence and popularly known as Pilkhana, On the South Azimpur Road, On the East Azimpur graveyard and On the West Headquarters of BGB. This locality is half a kilometer in length, from North to South and quarter kilometer in breadth, from East to West. At the middle south part of the area, there exists a defunct grave yard known as Iraqi graveyard, which is now used as play ground. Due to the openness of the Iraqi play ground and Azimpur graveyard, the entire locality has an extra advantage of flow of fresh Air, so also comes from the greenery of BGB headquarters, meaning thereby that this locality has ample greenery in one side and ample open space on the other side. This has made New Paltan a unique place for living.

New Paltan is situated mainly on the CS (cadastral survey) Mouza 'Natun Paltaner Line' JL No.222, in the north, which was a big mouza covering the nearby Nilkhet area. The southern part of the locality was situated on differently named Mouza. Later in state acquisition survey (SA) the locality was split into differently named several Mouza, so also done in revisional survey (RS) and also in the recently implemented Dhaka Mahanagar Survey.

== History of New Paltan ==
In the year 1948 AD, there was no locality named New Paltan in this area, which was at that time a village-like area, having few huts with 4/5 families living in a discreet manner with Paddy fields around, in the northern area, although in the southern part there was a thin locality named, it is reported,'Pencil Para' as there was 3/5 family living, engaged in making Chalk Pencil. There was a Mosque near the gate of Azimpur Graveyard, established much earlier and used by the inhabitants of the adjacent area, especially the persons coming to Azimpur Graveyard. At that time One local Dhakaiya Kutti Lady Golenur Khatoon, popularly known as 'Lalur Maa' was owner of vast land at the northern portion of the area, who almost enjoying the status of Zamindar and residing in her thatched hut residence at the northern portion of the area where she was, as her profession, running a tea stall just beside the 3rd gate of the then EPR, which was known as 'Lalur Maar Dokan'. Another Dhakaiya Kutti gentleman Ayub Ali Sardar was also owner of a big chunk of land in the area, but he lived on the other side of the EPR 3rd gate. Janab Ayub Ali Sarder was by profession a Horse operator, who had a number of horses which were being engaged in horse races in the then Race Course of Dhaka, which brought him not only huge money but also different 'medal' from the English horse race lover of the time during the British Administration.

The later renowned personality of the area 'Janab Saiyad Alam Khan' purchased two Bigha land in the year 1948 for Rs.650 per Bigha and erected a one storied residential Building at the center of the paddy field and became the first settler of the new locality named by him 'New Paltan' on the basis of its biggest Mouza name 'Natun Paltaner lane'. On his approach 'Janab Md. Tofazzal Hossain' purchased three Bigha land and also erected his residence. Then came 'Janab Khabiruddin Talukdar', purchasing Nine Bigha Land. Later came 'Janab Md. Amiruddin and Janab Mohammad Hossain and few others and erected their residence. In the year 1949 Janab Abul Hashem Khan purchased six katha land for Rs.350.00 and erected one-storied residence in 1950, by taking loan of Rs.14,000.00 from Newly established House Building Finance Corporation (HBFC). He named his residence as 'Market View' in consonance to under construction Dacca New Market viewable from his residence. Later came his brother Abul Kashem Khan, Zahanara Begum. This trend continued and different gentlemen started purchasing land on the request of earlier settlers such as Mr. Hashem Shaeikh and his brother's Family and erected their residential houses. But there was no lay out of roads at that time and inhabitants used kutcha lanes, which were created automatically by use.

In the year 1962 Dr. Abdul Gaffar Khan MB (Cal), a renowned physician and social worker previously living at Calcutta, on the instance of his younger brother, the earlier settler Janab Abul Hashem Khan, purchased six katha land at the north-western corner of the area, just beside the then East Pakistan Rifles (EPR) boundary, at an amount of Rs.800.00 and on his initiation the initial inhabitants started to lay out the roads of the locality and accordingly the then Dacca Pourashava took over the area and started laying out the infrastructures, including paving the kutcha roads and allocating holding numbers. Accordingly, New Paltan holdings have been started with the holding of Dr. Abdul Gaffar Khan MB (Cal) with allocated number 1.

In the year 1968 the then distributor of Electricity Power Development Board (PDB) laid out an electricity line in the locality and Dhaka Water & Sewerage Authority (WASA) laid water line in the year 1974. The Titas Gas Company laid a gas line in the year 1976 and thence from New Paltan area became full-fledged habitable area. The T&T department gave telephone line to the locality in the year 1980.

== Social establishment ==
Al-Hera Jame Mashjid Complex: At the northern side of the locality, beside BGB gate no.3, a Mashjid Complex is situated under the ownership of Hazi Abdur Rashid Dilliwala Waqf Estate. It has a Hefz Khana and a liillah boarding where currently 70 students are getting Quran-e-hafez training including food and lodging free. A number of utility shops are situated at the ground floor of the mosque.

Uttaran Juba Sangshad: A registered Social welfare association of the local youths named 'Uttaran Juba Sangshad renders social service in the field of clearing Garbage from each residence of the locality in lieu of Tk.20.00 per family. It also observes National Days in a befitting manner and rises to social need in time.

== Utility establishments ==
Deep Tubewell:In the year 2012 the local MP managed to allot a Deep tube-well to be set up at the north-eastern corner of Iraqi play ground, but hampered by legal proceeding. Later after winning the legal battle with so-called Iraqi Association, who are falsely claiming ownership over the Iraqi play ground, the water pump was installed which now serves the long-cherished demand for adequate water supply in the locality.

== Play ground ==
Iraqi Play Ground: At the middle of the locality there exists a vast open field known as 'Iraqi play ground' which is being used as only play grounds for the youngsters of the locality. This field though controlled primarily by the local social welfare organisation Uttaran Juba Shangshad, yet all the local tiny sports organisations use the field as a play ground. This play ground is treated as the only breathing space of the locality where the elderly people stroll in the evening and 'Namaz-e-janaja' of deceased persons are held in this field.

== Commercial enterprises ==
Gold Jewellery: Natun Paltan is well known for its gold jewellery shops and workshops. Along with its main road, besides Azimpur Graveyard, as many as 50 gold jewellery shops along with their workshops are situated.

Furniture Shops: There are a number of furniture shops are situated beside the main road.

Printing Press: 1. Moni Printers $ Packages Ltd, Mr. Gausuddin Khan, Managing Director 2. Allied Printing Press, 185 New Paltan and few more presses.

Kutcha Bazar: There sits a temporary Kutcha Bazar in the morning at the Iraqi play ground where green vegetables, fresh fish, beef and meat, chicken, and other grocery are sold to the local inhabitants.

Meat Shop: A permanent meat shop cater the need of the inhabitants, which situates at the 3rd lane of the locality. But the entire stock finishes by 9 am.

Alam general store: A famous shop in New Palton area.

== Education ==
- Natun Paltan Line High School: EIIN: 108166
- Shahid Manik Adarsha Girls High School
- Ankon Art School
- Prithibi International School
- Madrasha Foyzul Ullom - A large Islamic Educational Institute which is established by Maulana Abu Abdullah. S. Iqbal
