= Institute of Applied Statistics and Data Science, University of Dhaka =

Academic institute of the University of Dhaka

Institute of Applied Statistics and Data Science (IASDS), University of Dhaka
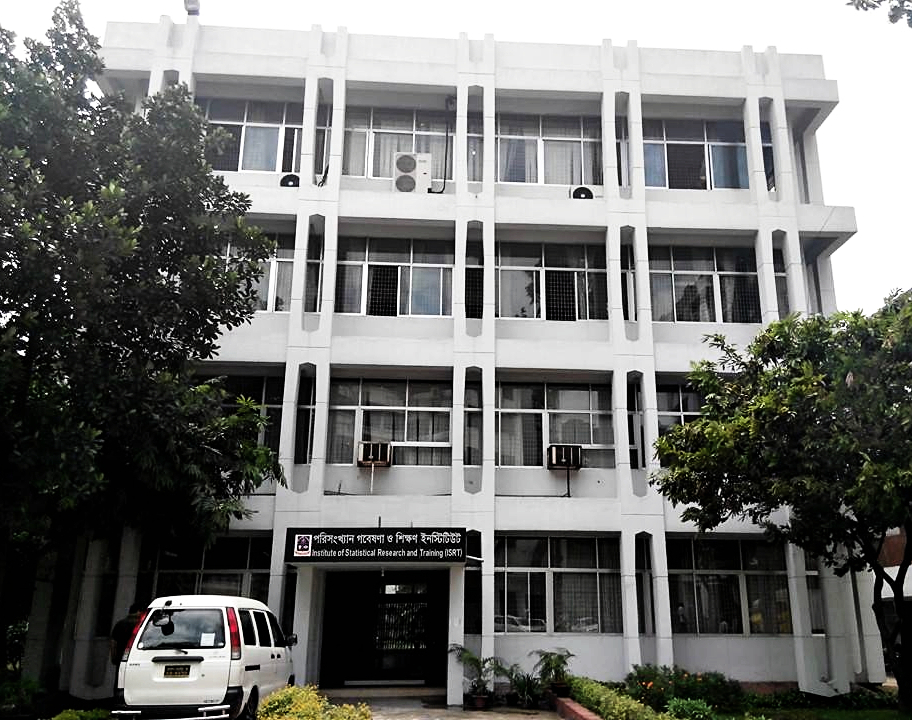
- IASDS, University of Dhaka
- Motto: The Highest Echelon of Academic Excellence
- Type: Educational Institution
- Established: 1964
- Affiliations: University of Dhaka
- Director: Jahida Gulshan
- Founder Director: Qazi Motahar Hossain
- Students: 270
- Location: Dhaka, Bangladesh; 23°43′43.60″N 90°23′54.12″E
- Campus: Urban
- Website: iasds-du.ac.bd

Institute of Applied Statistics and Data Science (IASDS), formerly known as Institute of Statistical Research and Training (ISRT), was established in 1964 by a statute of the University of Dhaka. The institute offers 4 years Bachelor of Science (BS) (Honors) and 1-year MS degree in applied statistics. IASDS also offers PhD and M Phil degrees. IASDS organizes training programs in applied statistics, SPSS and STATA for students in various disciplines, professionals, and academicians. The institute is the publisher of the Journal of Statistical Research (JSR), a bi-annual international journal in statistical sciences, published since 1970. Qazi Motahar Husain was the founding director of IASDS. Dr. Jahida Gulshan is the current director.

== Location ==
IASDS is located adjacent to Khundker Mokarram Hussain Science Building and Institute of Information Technology.

== Academics ==
IASDS offers 4-year bachelor's degree in Applied Statistics and 1-year Masters in Applied Statistics, along with MPhil and Ph.D. in Applied statistics. Students who are interested can seek admission to the bachelor's program after being selected in the admission test under the faculty of science conducted by the University of Dhaka.

IASDS offers short training modules for researchers, practitioners, students, and professionals who need a statistical background as well as computing knowledge with the computer using statistical packages like SPSS, SAS, STATA, and R, SQL. The institute offers various training programs routinely with the availability of the faculty members.

== Journal ==
The institute is the publisher of the Journal of Statistical Research (JSR), a bi-annual international journal in statistical sciences, published since 1970. It publishes original research articles both in theoretical and applied statistics areas.
