= Tahrunessa Abdullah =

Bangladeshi writer and activist

Tahrunessa Ahmed Abdullah
- তাহরুন নেসা আবদুল্লাহ
- Born: 21 April 1937 (age 89); Jessore, Bengal Province, British India
- Education: University of Dhaka; Michigan State University
- Occupation: Development activist
- Spouse: Siraj Kabir Mohammad Abdullah (m. 1970)
- Children: 1

Tahrunessa Ahmed Abdullah (born 21 April 1937) is a Bangladeshi writer and activist. She is notable for her researches and contribution to improve the lives of women in rural Bangladesh through her various levels of involvement with Bangladesh Academy for Rural Development. In 1978, she became the first Bangladeshi to receive the Ramon Magsaysay Award in the community leadership category.

== Early life and education ==
Abdullah was born on 21 April 1937 in the village of Ghoragachha of Jessore District in the then British India. Her father Rafiuddin Ahmed was a lawyer. After completing primary education from Calcutta, Ahmed moved to Dhaka with her family. She then attended Kamrunnesa Government Girls High School and afterwards received a Bachelor of Arts from Eden Girls' College, University of Dhaka, in 1958. She then attended the College of Social Welfare and Research Center (also affiliated with Dhaka University and now an institute called the Institute of Social Welfare and Research), receiving her Master of Arts in the school's first graduating class in 1960. In 1966, Ahmed went to the United States to study at Michigan State University, from which she received a Master of Science in agriculture extension education in 1968. Her thesis was entitled, The Place of Evaluation in Comilla Women's Program. This graduate year was underwritten by the Ford Foundation.

== Career ==
=== Pakistan era ===
Ahmed's first position after graduation was as Executive Officer of the East Pakistan Council for Child Welfare in Dhaka. She organised the Crippled Children's Center. At that time she also wrote the first article on social problems, "School Social Work and Its Scope in East Pakistan." From mid-1961 to 1963 she was district health education officer for the Bureau of Health Education. In pursuit of this interest, she attended, under a US International Cooperation Administration (now United States Agency for International Development) grant, the American University of Beirut, receiving a diploma, with distinction, in public health in 1962.

In 1963, Ahmed joined then Pakistan Academy for Rural Development in Comilla as instructor in charge of the recently instituted Women's Program and in that capacity headed the academy's Women's Education and Home Development Program. The Women's Education and Home Development Program was begun at Comilla Academy in 1962. During her nine years at Comilla, she was responsible for the organisation of village level training programs for women that included adult literacy; health education, sanitation, and nutrition; agricultural extension; creation of cooperatives to promote cottage crafts and other income generating activities. She also developed training courses for government officials on women's problems and health needs in rural East Pakistan (now Bangladesh) and coordinated the overall Comilla Academy training program. For two years she was also in charge of the publication section and for one year served as vice-chairman of the Comilla Khadi Association.

=== Bangladesh era ===
Within this context of crisis Abdullah's experience, a Comilla Academy brought her to the forefront of the rehabilitation of fort after the war. In 1972, she became the director (training) of the National Board of the Bangladesh Women's Rehabilitation and Welfare Foundation. During her two years in this capacity she established the Women' Career Training Institute, the first institution in Bangladesh wholly devoted to career training for women. As the director, Abdullah was involved in the planning, organisation and execution of all training, production and marketing programs of the institute, and exercised administrative and financial supervision, as well.

After 1974, Abdullah served, under a series of Directors General, as Joint Director in charge of the Women's Program, of Bangladesh's Integrated Rural Development Program (IRDP). Her job has been to develop a national plan for integrating rural women into the nation's economic and social development process. She is well aware that unless women are regarded as an integral, functional part of society, their development, and the development of the nation, will be hampered. Since the beginning she has administered and supervised the program and has been responsible for staff training.

From the beginning Abdullah and her colleagues found "misinformation about rural women ... to be extraordinarily pervasive and persistent". The most fundamental area of misinformation concerned the daily activities of the women. Researchers who questioned male villagers about women had been told they work at "nothing" and know "nothing". Rural women were consequently perceived by all levels of society as ignorant, superstitious and without much work except cooking, cleaning and childbearing. Since the urban elite responsible for economic planning was given to understand that women did no agricultural work (and certainly most appear in the fields only under conditions of the most desperate poverty), women were consistently omitted from planning objectives.

Since the Women's Program is part of the Bangladesh population project, Abdullah became a respected voice on the international level on both advancement of women and population planning. In 1975, she attended the Population Planning Communications seminar at the East–West Center, Honolulu; the World Congress for International Women's Year in Berlin, and the International Seminar on Population Communication sponsored by the United Nations Food and Agriculture Organization (FAO) in Colombo, Sri Lanka. The United Nations also invited her in 1976 to be a delegate to the Economic and Social Council of Asia and the Pacific committee meeting on population in Bangkok, and to a UN Expert Group Meeting in New York on the "Establishment of an International Research and Training Institute for the Advancement of Women." In 1977, she was invited by the director general of FAO to attend a meeting of experts on "Integration of Rural Women in Development" in Rome, and the following year she attended a consultancy meeting of the UN International Labor Organization in Geneva on "Women and Rural Development." That same year, she also attended the seminar on Action Research on Women in Rural Development at the University of Sussex, England. For the last three years she has worked as short term consultant to the U.N. Development Program and the U.N. Fund for Population Activities in Lanka, helping the Sri Lanka Mahila Samiti (women's institutes introduced by Dr. Mary H. Rutnam, 1958 Ramon Magsaysay Awardee for Public Service for "her gift of service to the Ceylonese people and example she has set by her full life of dedication as a private citizen the needs of others") develop a production-oriented women's program similar to the one she has developed in Bangladesh.

Abdullah has written more than 15 papers and articles on her work, and co-authored a book, Village Women of Bangladesh: Prospect for Change, written with Sondra Zeidenstein.

== Awards ==
Ahmed was awarded Ramon Magsaysay award for community leadership in 1978 as a recognition of her role in "leading rural Bangladeshi Muslim women from the constraints of purdah toward an equal citizenship and fuller family responsibility" .
