= Delta Research Centre =

Research institutes in Bangladesh

- Formation: June 1991
- Headquarters: Dhaka, Bangladesh
- Region served: Bangladesh
- Official language: Bengali
- Website: Delta Research Centre

Delta Research Centre is an autonomous government research institute under the University of Dhaka system that researches the Bengal delta in Bangladesh and is located in Dhaka, Bangladesh. Bangladesh is made of the largest delta in the world.

== History ==
Delta Research Centre was established in June 1991. It is governed by a Board of Governors which is headed by the Vice Chancellor of the University of Dhaka. The centre researched Open-pit mining in Phulbari coal mine. The centre has faced difficulties into conducting research due to lack of necessary equipments and funds.
