= Renewable Energy Research Centre =

Research institute in Bangladesh

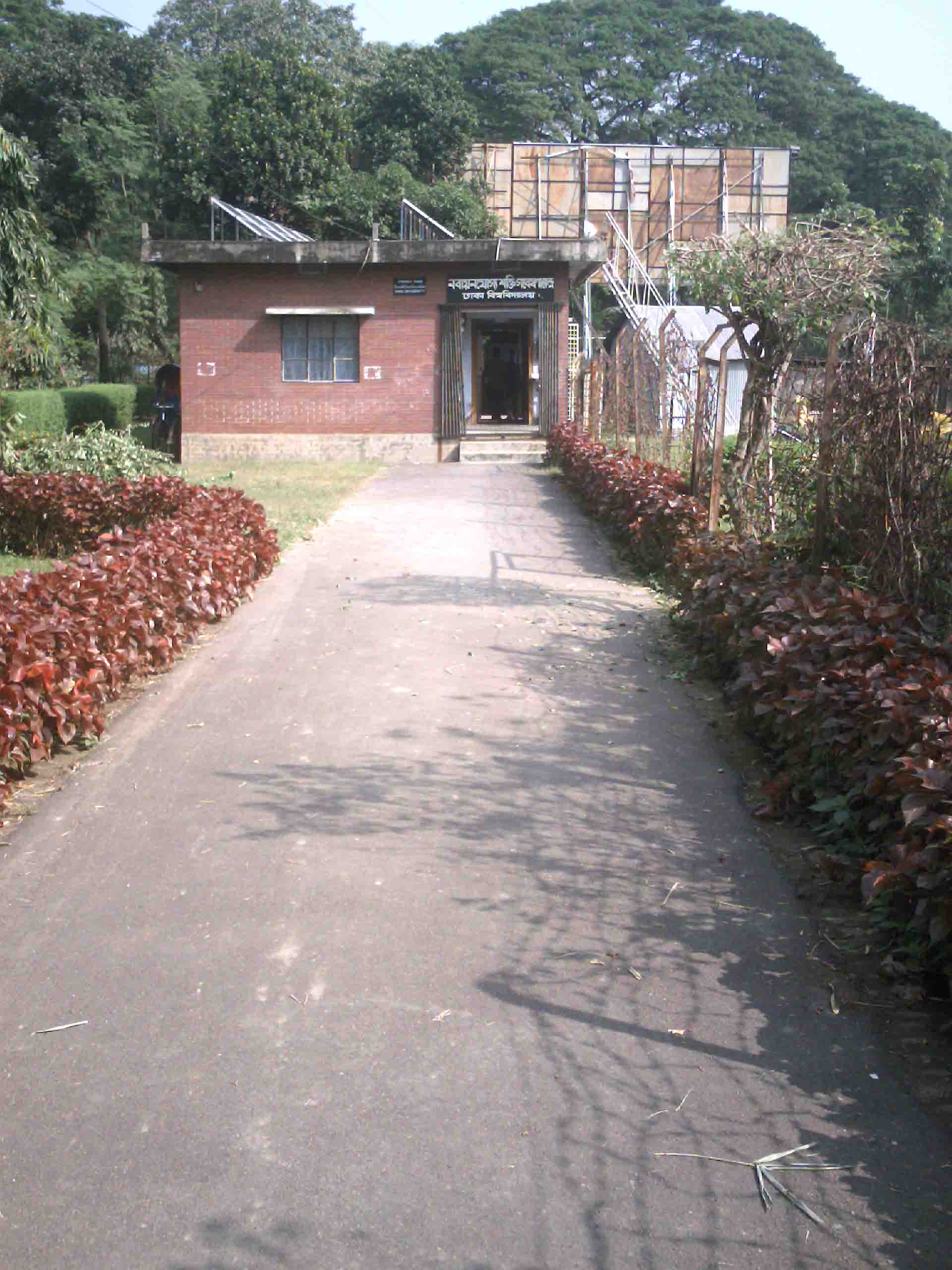
- Renewable Energy Research Center
- Formation: 1986
- Headquarters: University of Dhaka, Dhaka, Bangladesh
- Region served: Bangladesh
- Official language: Bengali
- Website: Renewable Energy Research Centre

Renewable Energy Research Centre is an autonomous national research institute, under the University of Dhaka, that carries out research and plans water resource management projects in Bangladesh and is located in Dhaka, Bangladesh. It has a particular focus on solar energy and works with the Bangladesh Solar Energy Society.

== History ==
Renewable Energy Research Centre was established in 1986 under the Faculty of Science of the University of Dhaka. It is managed by an advisory board that is chaired by the Vice-Chancellor of University of Dhaka. It specialises on solar energy research and provides MSc, MPhil, and PhD degrees. The centre opened an energy park in 1988 on its premises. In 2008 a 1.1 kW rooftop solar grid was installed in the research centre with the financial support of the Ministry of Science and Technology. Renewable Energy Resource Assessment is a project under the Renewable Energy Research Centre and is a project of United Nations Environment Programme.
