= Ponabalia Massacre =

Ponabalia Massacre (Bengali: পোনাবালিয়া হত্যাকান্ড, romanized: Ponabaliẏa Hôttakanḍô) was the mass murder of 20 Bengali Muslims in Ponabalia by members of the Indian Imperial Police on orders of the district magistrate on 7 March 1927.

== History ==
On 7 March 1927, Bengali Hindus were going towards the Ponabalia Shiva temple in a procession on the occasion of Shivaratri in Ponabalia, Nalchity, Jhalokati District, Barisal Division, East Bengal, British India. The procession was singing Sankirtan and beating drums. The processions was passing by a mosque where Muslims were praying. The Muslims asked the Hindus to observe silence, which they refused. The Muslims tried to stop the procession by creating a human barricade. Satindranath Sen, a Satyagraha activist, asked the Hindus to perform Sankirtan louder. The District Magistrate, E. N. Blandy, and Superintendent of Police, Taylor rushed to the scene along with a Police force.

The Muslims were unable to communicate with the British officials, as they did not know English. So they tried to communicate to the officers through hand gestures that they would rather die than have their prayers disturbed. The Hindus who were literate and could speak English, told the officers that the Muslims wanted to kill them. Blandy, misled, ordered the police to fire, killing 20 Muslims. More were wounded. Other reports suggested a Muslim speared a police officer.

== Aftermath ==
Few days later the All Bengal Muslim Conference called for an inquiry commission into the incident. The commission was formed and it submitted a report, which was never published. The incident has been called an evidence of communal disharmony during the post-noncooperation in rural Bengal and was highlighted by the Muslim press.
