= Institute of Social Welfare and Research, University of Dhaka =

Research institute in Bangladesh

Coordinates: 23.7318°N 90.3806°E

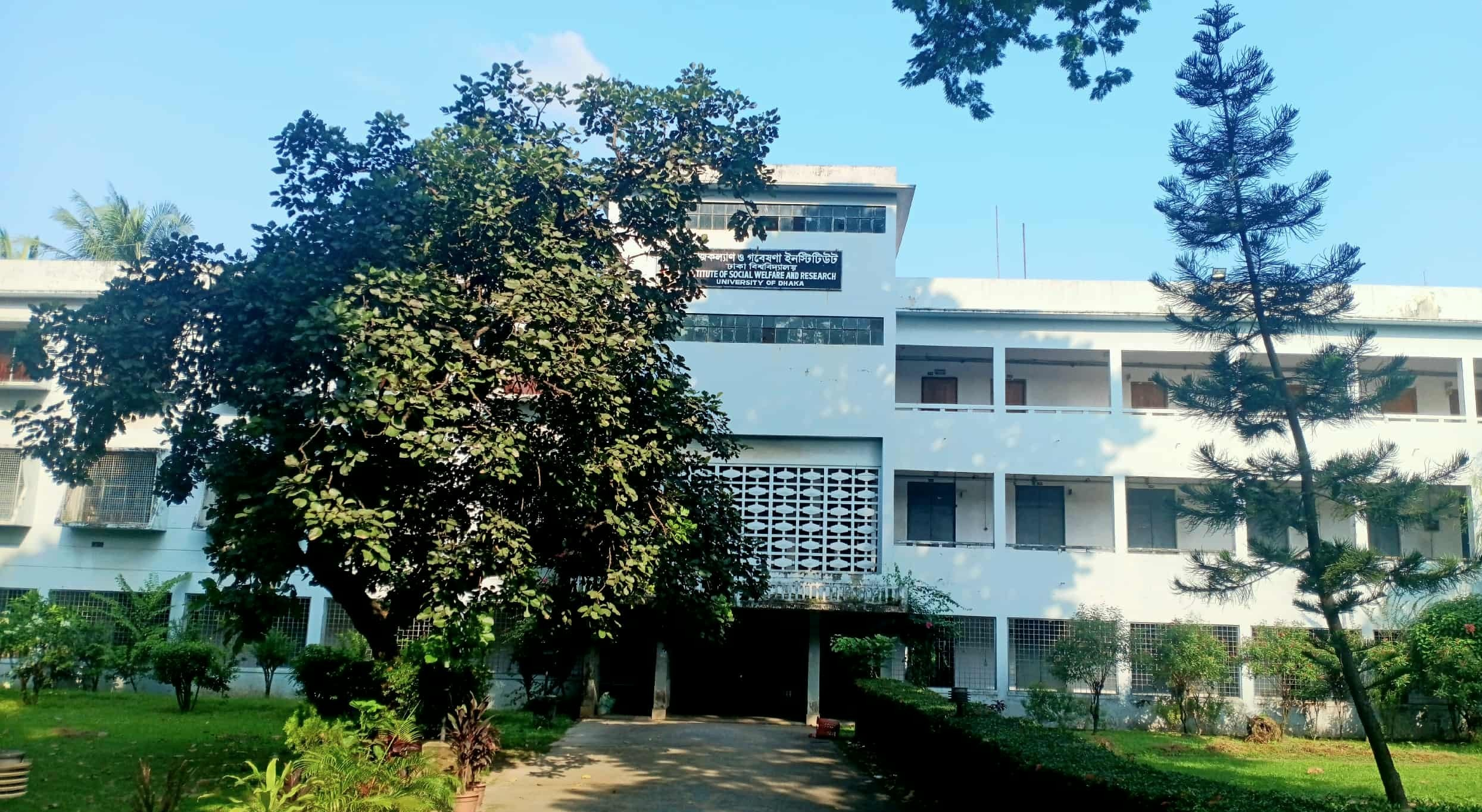
Institute of Social Welfare and Research

Institute of Social Welfare and Research is one of the oldest institutes of the University of Dhaka. It is the apex institution for the social work education in Bangladesh. It offers Graduation, Post-Graduation, M.Phil. and PhD degrees to students in social welfare/social work.

The institute is situated in the New Market area in the capital, adjacent to the gate-3 of Border Guard Bangladesh headquarters. It is situated in the same premises of two female dormitories of the University of Dhaka, Begum Fajilatunnessa Mujib Hall and Bangladesh- Kuwait Maitree Hall and detached from the main campus of the University of Dhaka.

== History ==
The College of Social Welfare and Research Centre was established in 1958 as a constituent college of the University of Dhaka.

Later in 1973, the college was made an institute of the University of Dhaka and renamed as the Institute of Social Welfare and Research. A separate premises was allocated to the institute, where the academic building with one men's and one girls' hostel for the institutes' students were constructed by the end of 1974, where after the academic activity of the Institute commenced in the said premises.

The academic building was attached with a large open field within the premises, which became the only after-noon recreational place for inhabitant of the adjacent residential locality New Paltan. In the years 1997 and 2008 two four storied girls' students halls of the Dhaka University namely Bangladesh Kuwait Maitree Hall and Begum Fajilatunnesa Mujib Hall respectively, were constructed in that field covering the whole area. This had made the entire premises a congested area, destroying the earlier beauty of the premises.

Programs

- BSS Honors Program
- Masters Program
- M. Phil Program
- Ph.D. Program

== Facilities ==
- A K Ahamadulla Library
- Seminar Room
- Cyber Centre
- Social Welfare Canteen

== Publications ==
- Journal of Social Development

== Notable alumni ==
- Colonel Abu Taher, Biruttam, sector commander of the Liberation War of Bangladesh.
- Tahrunessa Abdullah, first Bangladeshi who was awarded Ramon Magsaysay award for community leadership in 1978
- Md. Shahidul Haque, senior secretary, Ministry of Foreign Affairs
- A. K. M. Shahidul Haque, 27th inspector general of Bangladesh Police
- Mohammad Javed Patwary, retired-IGP, ambassador of Bangladesh to Saudi Arabia
