= Skyquake =

Loud sound reported to come from the sky

A skyquake is a phenomenon where a loud sound is reported to originate from the sky. It often manifests as a banging, reoccurring thunderous rumbles (where no storms are active), sonic boom from jet engines (where there are no signs of aircraft), or a horn-like noise. The sound may cause noticeable effects on buildings, including vibration in ceilings or across the walls of a particular room. Those who experience skyquakes typically do not have a clear explanation for what caused them. As a result, they are sometimes perceived as mysterious or supernatural. They have been heard in several locations around the world, typically in areas close to lakes and other bodies of water. Reports of skyquakes have come from the North Sea, the Ganges, Canada, Colombia, Japan, Finland, Vanuatu, Australia, Italy, Ireland, India, The Netherlands, Norway, Tierra del Fuego in Argentina, the United Kingdom, the United States, Mexico, Malaysia (particularly Ipoh) and Indonesia (particularly Jakarta and Java).

== Local names ==
Names (according to area) are:

- Bangladesh: Barisal guns
- France: "bombes de mer," "canons de mer".
- Indonesia: dentuman (lit: "clatter") or suara tembakan meriam (lit: "the sound of cannon fire").
- Italy: "brontidi," "marina," "balza," "lagoni," "bomba," "rombo," "boato," "bonnito," "mugghio," "baturlio," "tromba," "rufa."
- Japan: "uminari" (literally, "cries from the sea")
- Netherlands and Belgium: "mistpoeffers," "zeepoeffers," "zeedoffers," "mistbommen," "gonzen," "balken," "onderaardse geruchten."
- Philippines and Iran: "retumbos"
- United States: "Guns of the Seneca" around Seneca Lake and Cayuga Lake, and Seneca guns in the Southeast US
- Latin America and Spain: "cielomoto"
- Canada: "seefahrts"
- elsewhere: "fog guns," "mistpouffers," "waterguns"

In 1804, they were reportedly heard during the Lewis and Clark Expedition near Great Falls. Meriwether Lewis wrote, “[S]ince our arrival at the falls we have repeatedly witnessed a noise which proceeds from a direction a little to the N. of West as loud and resembling precisely the discharge of a piece of ordinance of 6 pounds at the distance of three miles.” William Clark added in his notes, “…a rumbling like Cannon at a great distance is heard to the west of us; the Cause we Can’t account.”

They have been reported from an Adriatic island in 1824; Western Australia, South Australia and Victoria in Australia; Belgium; frequently on calm summer days in the Bay of Fundy and Passamaquoddy Bay, New Brunswick, Canada; Lough Neagh in Northern Ireland; Scotland; Cedar Keys, Florida; Franklinville, New York in 1896; and northern Georgia in the United States.

== Hypotheses ==
Their origin has not been positively identified. Given the long time that they have been known and reported, but with no proposal experimentally confirmed, it seems likely that they occur for more than one reason. Proposed explanations have been:

- Moderate-sized meteors causing sonic booms as they strike the lower atmosphere.
- Gas explosions, either by ignition or sudden release of trapped deposits:
  - Underwater caves collapsing, and either the released air and/or a wave of water pressure vacuum abruptly arriving at the lake surface.
  - Volcanic eruptions (in places near known volcanic activity).
- Military aircraft surreptitiously creating sonic booms (this origin does not explain these sounds being heard before the advent of supersonic flight, but this entry could be extended to include military cannon-fire practice).
- Earthquakes: Shallow earthquakes can generate sound waves with little ground vibration: The "booming" sound is heard only locally, near the epicenter.
- Avalanches, either natural or human-caused (for avalanche control).
- Weather: Distant thunder, or loud sounds from wind damage.
- Atmospheric ducting of distant thunder or other loud sounds from far off. (Note: "Ducting" is enhanced propagation of sound or radio waves over long distances, through the troposphere, by wave travel that's constrained between distinct air layers.)
- Secondary atmospheric waves from plasma impacts of solar CMEs. CMEs generate plasma shock waves in space, similar to the sonic boom caused by aircraft flying faster than the speed of sound in Earth's atmosphere. The solar wind's equivalent of a sonic boom in the Solar System plasma medium can accelerate protons up to millions of miles per minute – as much as 40 percent of the speed of light. This is a proven source of auroras, but has never yet been shown to be sufficiently forceful and sufficiently abrupt to cause a "boom".
- Possible resonance from solar and/or Earth magnetic activity inducing sounds.
- Breaking waves: A line of breaking waves on a rocky shore is capable of producing booming noises at low frequencies, thereby allowing the sound to travel for longer distances.

== See also ==
- Bell Island Boom, attributed to a lightning superbolt
- List of meteor air bursts
- List of unexplained sounds
- Electrophonic hearing
