= Barisal guns =

19th century sounds in Bangladesh

Barisal guns or fog guns (mistpoeffers (fog dissipators) in Belgium and Netherlands, Seeschießen (sea/lake gunshots) in Germany, brontidi (thunder-alike) or baturlio marinas in Italy) are a series of loud booms heard near the Barisal region of Bangladesh in the 19th century. There are various theories about the origin of the sound. One common explanation is that it was caused by the sound of waves, broken up by local topography, but geological origins have also been proposed. The sound is an example of a skyquake – an unexplained sudden loud sound without corresponding earthquake activity. Similar sounds have been reported in many waterfront communities around the world such as the Ganges Delta and Brahmaputra River delta in Bangladesh, the East Coast and inland Finger Lakes of the United States, as well as areas of the North Sea, the lakes of southern Germany, Japan and Italy; and sometimes away from water, for example, in the American midwest where they have been attributed to cold temperature.

The unexplained source of the phenomenon has drawn mystical interpretations, for example in Theosophical writings.
