= Israt Sultana Elen Bhutto =

Bangladeshi politician

- ইসরাত সুলতানা ইলেন ভুট্টো

Member of Parliament
- Incumbent
- Assumed office 17 February 2026
- Preceded by: Amir Hossain Amu

Personal details
- Party: Bangladesh Nationalist Party
- Spouse: Zulfiker Ali Bhutto

Israt Sultana Elen Bhutto is a Bangladesh Nationalist Party politician and a member of parliament from Jhalokathi-2.

== Career ==
Following the death of her husband, Member of Parliament Zulfiker Ali Bhutto, his widow was elected to represent the Jhalokati-2 constituency during a 2000 by-election. Running as a Bangladesh Nationalist Party (BNP) candidate, she secured the seat and successfully defended it in the 2001 general election by defeating Amir Hossain Amu of the Awami League. She continued her political career and was eventually re-elected to the 13th Bangladeshi Parliament under the BNP banner.

== Lawsuit ==
She faced a 2006 lawsuit from her brother-in-law, Chunnu Mollah—who alleged her involvement in her husband's death
