= Gazi Aziz Ferdous =

Bangladeshi politician

- গাজী আজিজ ফেরদৌস

Member of Parliament

Personal details
- Died: 13 December 2005 Dhaka, Bangladesh
- Party: Bangladesh Nationalist Party

Gazi Aziz Ferdous (died 2005) was a Bangladesh Nationalist Party politician and member of parliament from Jhalokati-2.

== Career ==
Ferdous was elected to parliament from Jhalokati-2 in 1991 and 1996 as a Bangladesh Nationalist Party candidate. He had also served as the Jhalokati Sadar Upazila chairman.

== Death ==
Ferdous died on 13 December 2005 in Dhaka, Dhanmondi, Bangladesh. Died because of a stroke in his sleep on the coach of his daughters apartment.
