= Nalchity =

Town and municipality in Barisal Division

Nalchity নলছিটি
- Town and Municipality
- Nalchity Municipality mahallah geocode map

- Location in Bangladesh
- Coordinates: 22.635°N 90.270°E
- Country: Bangladesh
- Division: Barisal Division
- District: Jhalokati District
- Upazila: Nalchity Upazila

Government
  - Type: Municipality
  - Body: Nalchity Municipality

Area
  - Total: 23.3 km^{2} (9.0 sq mi)

Population (2011)
  - Total: 30,803
  - Density: 1,320/km^{2} (3,420/sq mi)
- Time zone: UTC+6 (BST)

Nalchity (Bengali: নলছিটি) is a town in Jhalokati District in Barisal division, Bangladesh. It is the administrative headquarters and urban centre of Nalchity Upazila.
