= Institute of Information Technology, University of Dhaka =

Institute of Information Technology
- Seal of IIT
- Motto: Professionalism, Excellence, Respect
- Established: 2001 (1985 as Computer Center)
- Director: Dr. B M Mainul Hossain
- Location: Dhaka, Bangladesh; 23.7290°N 90.3983°E
- Website: iit.du.ac.bd

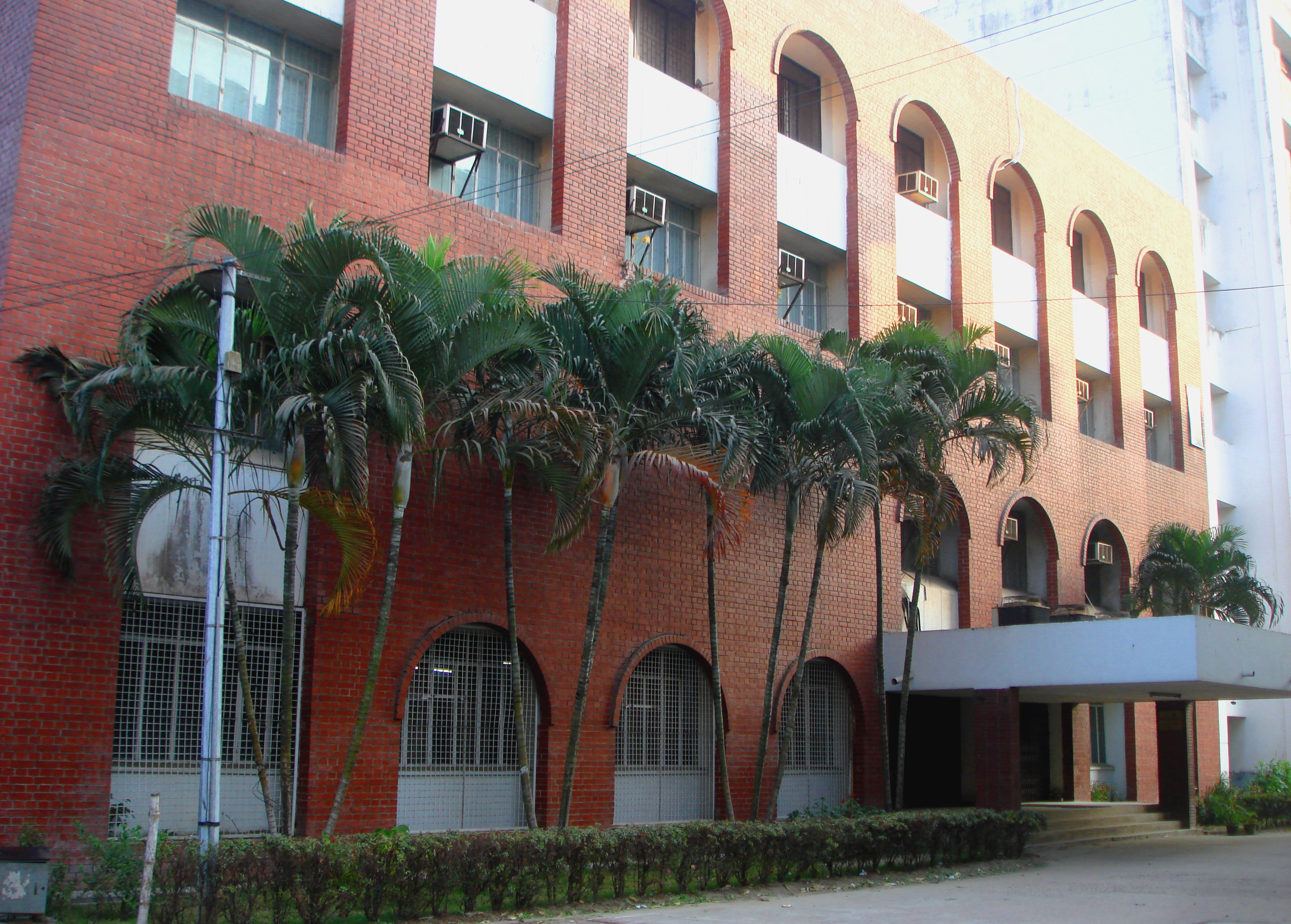
South Facing Frontal View of The Four Storied Building of IIT, DU

Institute of Information Technology, University of Dhaka (IIT, DU) is an educational institution aimed at developing efficient human resource in the field of information technology. IIT currently offers Bachelor of Science in Software Engineering (BSSE), Master of Science in Software Engineering (MSSE), Master's Degree in Information Technology (MIT) and Post Graduate Diploma in Information Technology (PGDIT).

== Establishment ==
In the annual session of June 2001, The Dhaka University Senate established the Institute of Information Technology (IIT) by converting the erstwhile Computer Center (established in 1985). The aim was to train skilled manpower in the field of information technology (IT) and to establish computer network in the university.

== List of directors ==
Name	From	To	Reference
A M Harun ar Rashid^{*}	13-May-1985	29 August 1989	
Ajoy Kumar Roy^{*}	30-Aug-1989	30-Jun-1995	
Md. Lutfar Rahman^{*}	01-Jul-1995	03-Nov-1999	
Ahmed Shafee^{*}	04-Nov-1999	26-Jun-2001	
Ahmed Shafee	27-Jun-2001	24-Jul-2002	
A K M Maqbulur Rahman	31-Jul-2002	29-Jul-2005	
Zerina Begum	30-Jul-2005	29-Jul-2008	
Mohd. Zulfiquar Hafiz	30-Jul-2008	29-Jul-2011	
Md. Mahbubul Alam Joarder	30-Jul-2011	30-Jul-2014	
Kazi Muheymin-Us-Sakib	01-Aug-2014	01-Aug-2017	
Md. Shariful Islam	02-Aug-2017	05-Aug-2020	
Mohammed Shafiul Alam Khan	06-Aug-2020	05-Aug-2023	
B M Mainul Hossain	06-Aug-2023	Present	
