= Zulfiker Ali Bhutto =

Bangladeshi politician

Member of Bangladesh Parliament

Personal details
- Died: May 2000
- Party: Jatiya Party (Ershad)
- Spouse: Israt Sultana Elen Bhutto

Zulfiker Ali Bhutto was a Jatiya Party (Ershad) politician and a former member of parliament for Jhalokati-2.

== Career ==
Bhutto was elected to parliament from Jhalokati-2 as a Jatiya Party candidate in 1986 and 1988.
