= University of Dhaka =

Public university in Dhaka, Bangladesh

- ঢাকা বিশ্ববিদ্যালয়
- Crest of DU
- Other name: DU
- Former name: University of Dacca (1921–1982)
- Motto: শিক্ষাই আলো
- Motto in English: Education is light (Latin: Educere Est Lux)
- Type: Public research university
- Established: 1921; 105 years ago
- Founders: Nawab Sir Khwaja Salimullah Bahadur; Syed Nawab Ali Chowdhury
- Accreditation: UGC, PCB, Bar Council, ACU
- Budget: ৳1035.45 crore (US$84 million) (2025–26)
- Chancellor: President Mirza Fakhrul Islam Alamgir
- Vice-Chancellor: A. B. M. Obaidul Islam
- Academic staff: 2,156+
- Administrative staff: 3,887
- Students: 44,895 (2023)
- Undergraduates: 30,000+
- Postgraduates: 9,362+
- Doctoral students: 974+
- Other students: 269+
- Location: Shahbag, Dhaka, 1000, Bangladesh; 23°43′59″N 90°23′28″E
- Campus: 275.083 acres (111.322 ha); Urban
- Colors: Navy Blue and Red
- Website: www.du.ac.bd

University rankings

Global – Overall
- QS World: =600 (2027)
- THE World: 801-1000 (2026)
- USNWR Global: 604 (2025)

Global – Business and economics
- THE Business and Economics: 501–600 (2026)

Global – Education
- THE Education: 301–400 (2026)

Global – Liberal arts
- THE Social Sciences: 601–800 (2026)

Global – Life sciences and medicine
- THE Clinical and Health: 301–400 (2026)
- THE Life Sciences: 601–800 (2026)

Global – Science and engineering
- THE Computer Science: 601–800 (2026)
- THE Engineering: 501–600 (2026)
- THE Physical Sciences: 601–800 (2026)

Regional – Overall
- QS Asia: 132 (2026)
- THE Asia: 401–500 (2025)

The University of Dhaka (Bengali: ঢাকা বিশ্ববিদ্যালয়), also known as Dhaka University (DU), is a public research university located in Dhaka, Bangladesh. Established in 1921, it is the oldest active university in Bangladesh.

The University of Dhaka was founded in 1921 under the Dacca University Act 1920 of the Indian Legislative Council. The establishment of the university in Dhaka began with 600 acres of land requisitioned by the British government in 1905 following the formation of the new province of East Bengal and Assam with Dhaka as its capital. Part of the land requisitioned belonged to the estate of Nawab Bahadur Sir Khwaja Salimullah. It is modeled after British universities. It is the largest public research university in Bangladesh, with a student body of 46,150 and a faculty of 1,992.

The university has made significant contributions to the modern history of Bangladesh. After the Partition of India, it became the focal point of progressive and democratic movements in Pakistan. Its students and teachers played a very important role in the rise of Bengali nationalism and the independence of Bangladesh in 1971.

Notable alumni include physicist Satyendra Nath Bose, known for Bose–Einstein statistics and the theory of Bose–Einstein condensate; Muhammad Yunus, winner of the 2006 Nobel Peace Prize and pioneer of microcredit; Muhammad Shahidullah; Natyaguru Nurul Momen, pioneer of cultural, sports and theatrical activities of the university (he was both a student and later a teacher at the university); Serajul Islam Choudhury; physicist Mohammad Ataul Karim; 20th-century Bengali poet Buddhadeb Bose; and Sheikh Mujibur Rahman, the country's founding president.

It is the highest-ranked university in Bangladesh according to the QS World University Ranking.

== History ==
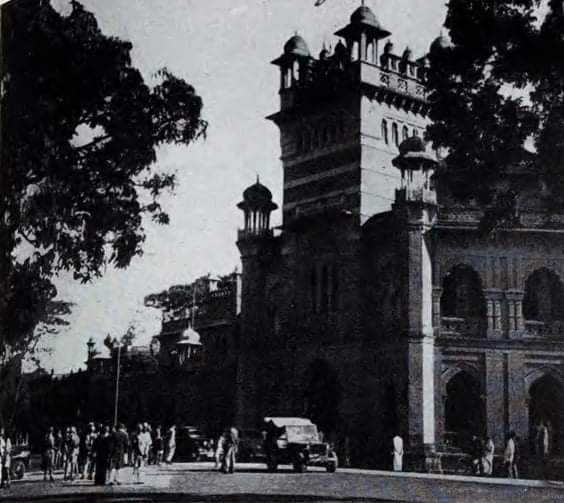
Curzon Hall, the first institute of the University of Dhaka in 1949

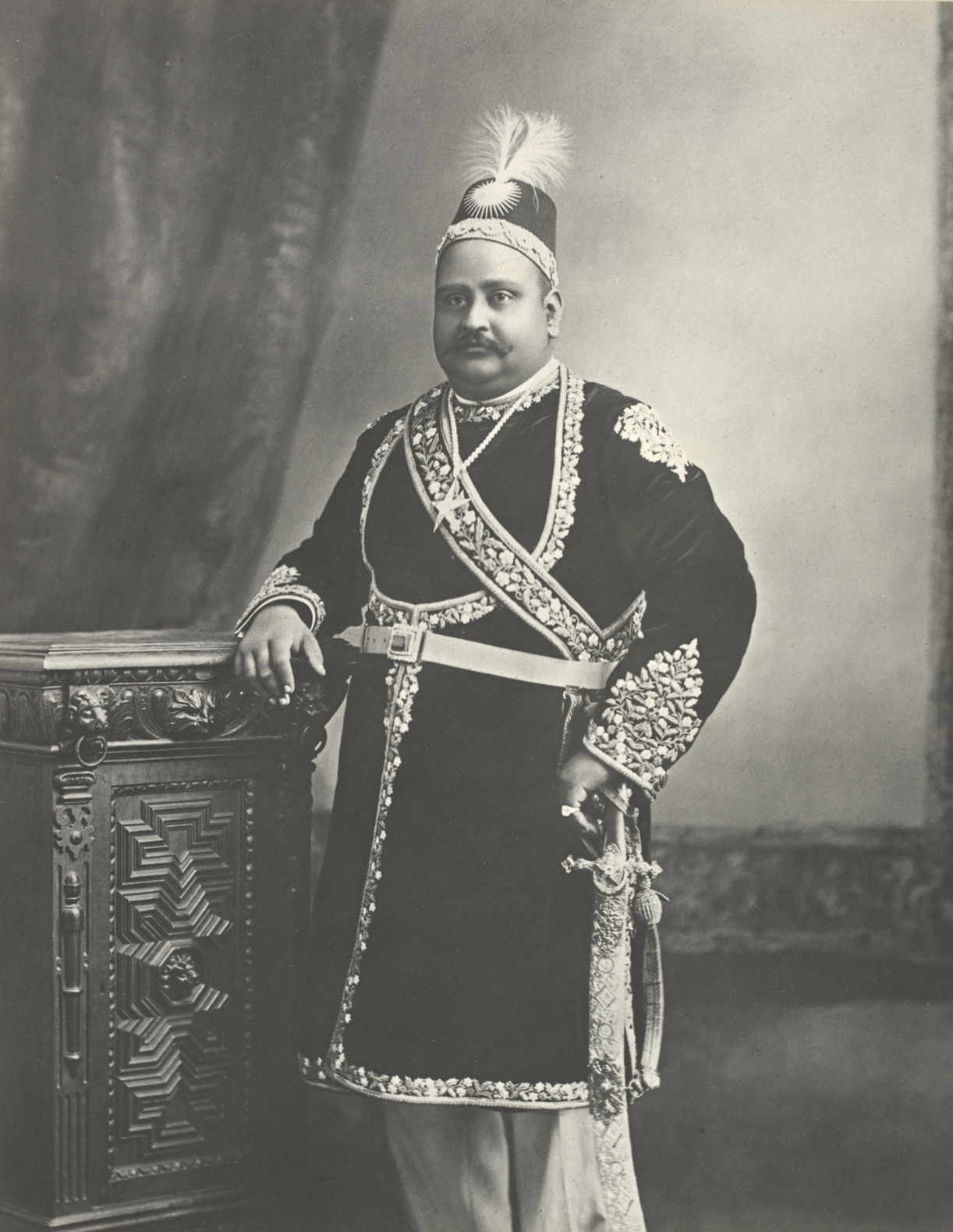
Nawab Bahadur Sir Khwaja Salimullah played a pioneering role in establishing the University of Dhaka and large part of 600 acres of land from his estate were acquired for this purpose.

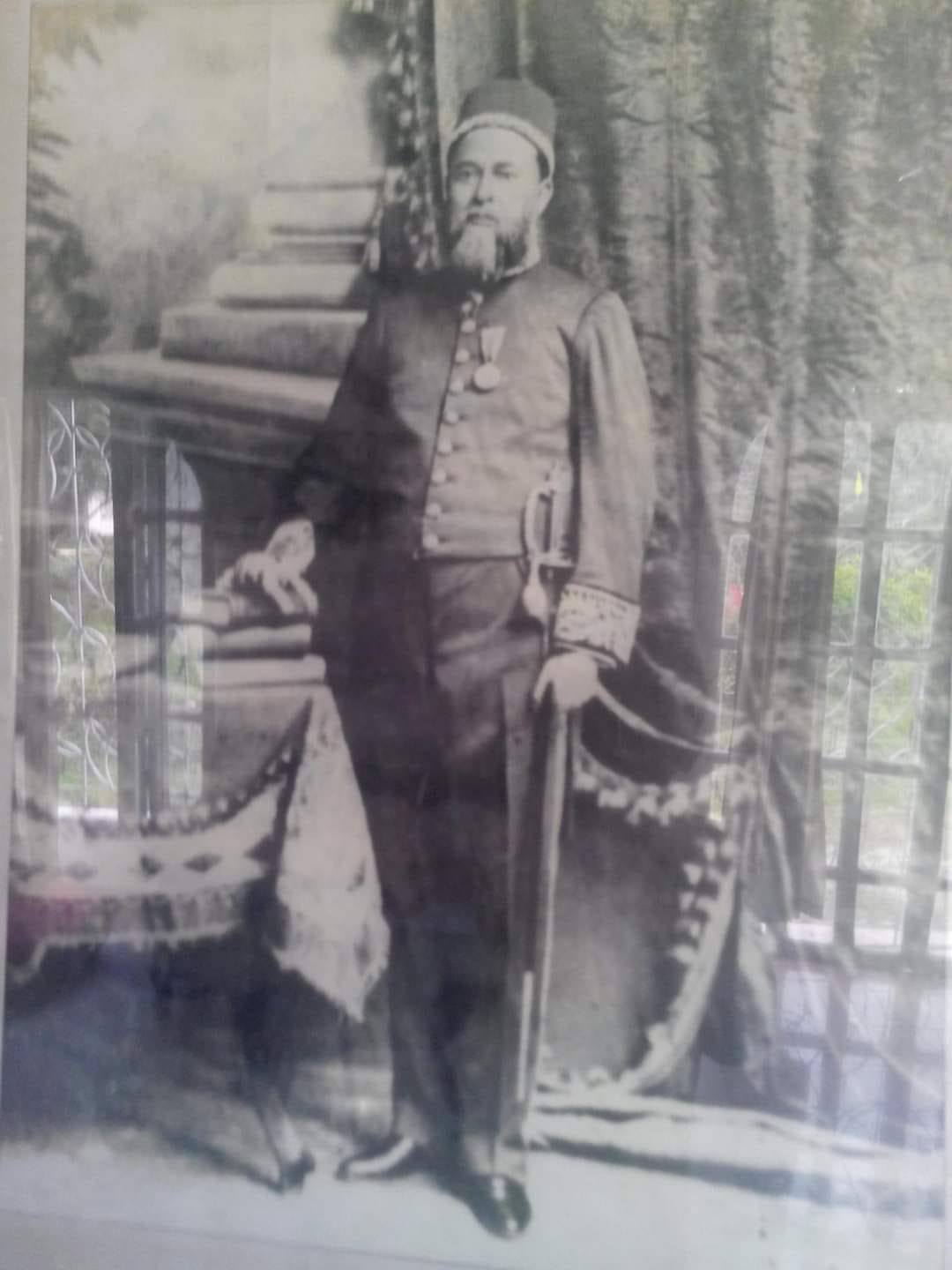
After Nawab Salimullah's death, Syed Nawab Ali Chowdhury continued efforts to set up the university, mortgaging a part of his zamindari estate, donating 35,000 takas for the University of Dhaka and 16,000 takas for scholarships for its students.

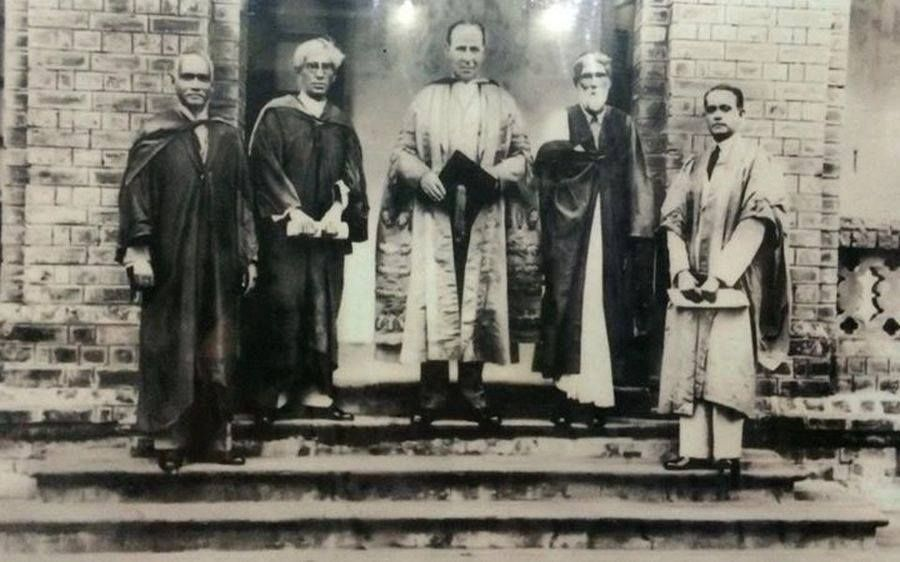
DU Convocation of 1936, (from left) Sir Jadunath Sarkar (historian), Sarat Chandra Chattopadhyay (writer), Sir John Anderson (Chancellor and Governor of Bengal), Acharya Prafulla Chandra Roy (chemist), Sir A F Rahman (Vice-Chancellor)

Before Dhaka University was established, near its grounds were the former buildings of Dhaka College, affiliated with the University of Calcutta. In 1873, the college was relocated to Bahadur Shah Park. Later it transferred to Curzon Hall, which would become the first institute of the university.

The establishment of the university was compensation for the annulment of the 1905 Partition of Bengal. The partition had established the Muslim-majority Eastern Bengal and Assam as a separate province, with Dhaka as its capital. The All-India Muslim League, newly formed in Dhaka, wholeheartedly supported the move.

However, the partition was abolished in 1911 due to severe opposition from the Indian National Congress and Bengali Hindus. Deeply hurt by the decision of the annulment of the partition of Bengal, a Muslim delegation led by Nawab Sir Khwaja Salimullah Bahadur, the then Nawab of Dhaka, demanded a university be set up in Dhaka. To appease the majority Muslim masses of East Bengal, Lord Curzon agreed and declared that a university as a centre of excellence would be established in Dhaka. Khwaja Salimullah, who pioneered the university in Dhaka, 600 acres of land from his estate was acquired for this purpose.

In 1913, public opinion was invited before the university scheme was given its final shape. The Secretary of State approved it in December 1913. The first vice-chancellor of the university, Philip Joseph Hartog, formerly the academic registrar of the University of London for 17 years, was appointed.

Established in 1921 under the Dacca University Act 1920 of the Indian Legislative Council, it is modelled after British universities. Lord Ronaldshay, Governor of Bengal between 1917 and 1922, was its first chancellor. He designated Nawaab Syed Shamsul Huda a life member of the university. On Huda's recommendation, Lord Ronaldshay appointed Ahmad Fazlur Rahman as a provost.

Academic activities started on 1 July 1921 with 847 students along with three faculties: Arts, Science and Law; 12 departments: Sanskrit and Bengali, English, Education, History, Arabic and Islamic Studies, Persian and Urdu, Philosophy, Economics and Politics, Physics, Chemistry, Mathematics, and Law; and three dormitories for students: Salimullah Muslim Hall, Dacca Hall and Jagannath Hall.

In 1936, the university awarded honorary doctorate degrees to Jagadish Chandra Bose, Jadunath Sarkar, Sarat Chandra Chattopadhyay, Allama Iqbal and Rabindranath Tagore.

The university played a significant role in the Bengali language movement when Bengalis united to fight against Urdu being the sole official language in East Pakistan.

Dhaka University was the main place where the movement started, with students joining and protesting against the Pakistan Government. Later, several students were killed at the site where the Shaheed Minar stands today. After the incident, Bengali was established as the official language.

The Dacca University Order, 1973 (President's Order No. 11 of 1973), reconstituted and reorganised the University of Dhaka to improve its teaching, research, and administration following the 1971 War of Independence. Throughout this order, the word Dhaka was substituted for the word Dacca by section 2 of the University Laws (Amendment) Act, 1987 (Act No. XXXVI of 1987).

On 18 July 2024, authorities at the University of Dhaka announced an indefinite closure of the institution after protests demanding reforms in the quota system in government jobs turned violent, leaving at least six people, including three students, dead across the country. However, the university reopened after the resignation of Prime Minister Sheikh Hasina amidst a mass uprising.

== Campus ==
=== Residential facilities ===
There are 23 residence halls for students and dormitories for teachers and university officials.

== Residential halls and hostels ==
The following list is based on the information provided on the official website of the University of Dhaka.

Halls

1. Salimullah Muslim Hall
2. Jagannath Hall
3. Dr. Muhammad Shahidullah Hall
4. Fazlul Huq Muslim Hall
5. Shahid Sergeant Zahurul Haq Hall
6. Ruqayyah Hall
7. Masterda Surja Sen Hall
8. Sir P. J. Hartog International Hall
9. Haji Muhammad Mohsin Hall
10. Shamsun Nahar Hall
11. Kabi Jasimuddin Hall
12. Sir A. F. Rahman Hall
13. Muktijoddha Ziaur Rahman Hall
14. Bangladesh-Kuwait Maitree Hall
15. Amar Ekushey Hall
16. Begum Fazilatun Nesa Mujib Hall
17. Kabi Sufia Kamal Hall
18. Bijoy Ekattor Hall
19. Bangabandhu Sheikh Mujibur Rahman Hall

Hostels

1. Nabab Foyzunnessa Chowdhurani Chhatrinibash
2. IBA Hostel
3. Dr. Qudrat-E-Khuda Hostel
4. Shahid Athlete Sultana Kamal Hostel

=== Libraries ===
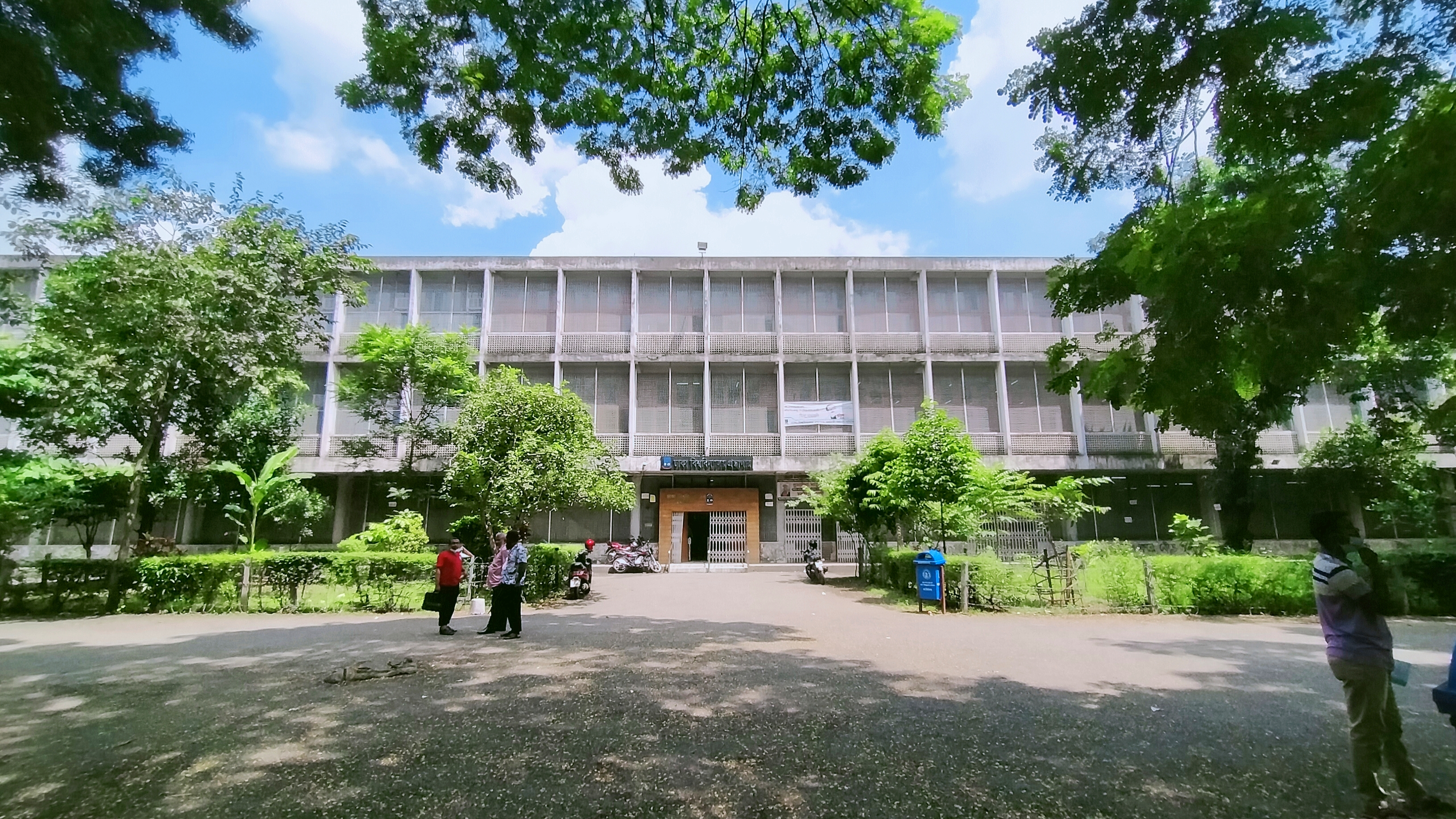
Dhaka University Library

The University Library, housed in three separate buildings, is the largest in Bangladesh. The library holds a collection of more than 617,000 volumes, including bound volumes of periodicals. In addition, it has a collection of over 30,000 manuscripts in other languages and a large number of microfilms, microfiche, and CDs. It subscribes to over 300 foreign journals.

The Dhaka University Library comprises three buildings: the administrative building, the main library building, and the science library building. The administrative building has administrative offices, a book acquisition section, a book processing section, a reprographic section, a bookbinding section, a manuscript section, and a seminar section.

Additionally, the Faculty of Business Studies has an e-library which is the largest of its kind in Asia. This advanced-level e-library is connected with 35 internationally renowned libraries and publication houses in the world. Teachers, students, and researchers can read all journals, books, research papers, and articles of these leading libraries, including the University of Oxford and University of Cambridge libraries, by using the e-library facilities.

This e-library was built in collaboration with Robi Axiata Limited in August 2015. It can accommodate around 1,400 students. The 12,000 square feet (1,100 m^{2}) library has three sections: a computer section, a silent zone, and a discussion zone. Some 7,000 students and 208 teachers of the faculty are directly benefiting from the facility.

=== Health services ===
The Medical Centre of the University of Dhaka, near the Science Annex Building, offers free medical services and free pathological examinations to students, teachers, staff, and their family members. The centre provides service round-the-clock, seven days a week, with 30 doctors working in shifts. The centre has a dental unit, an eye unit, an X-ray department, and two ambulances.

=== Cafeteria ===
There are cafeterias on campus, some of which hold historical and architectural interest. In 1971, Pakistani soldiers killed the owner of the Madhur Canteen.

The Teacher-Student Centre (TSC) has its own cafeteria, while another cafeteria stands on the Dhaka University Snacks (DUS) Chattar. The Science cafeteria was situated behind Curzon Hall but was demolished to construct a new 20-storey building. There is also another snack and lunch place named DU Hut in front of the Department of Sociology. The Faculty of Business Studies has a modern food court for its students.

=== Fuller Road ===
Fuller Road
- Sir Syed Ahmed Road
- Interactive map of Fuller Road
- Namesake: Bampfylde Fuller
- Type: Street
- Maintained by: Dhaka South City Corporation
- Length: 0.95 km (0.59 mi)
- Location: Dhaka
- Postal code: 1000
- North end: Nilkhet Road
- South end: Shahid Minar Road

Fuller Road is a road in Shahbag, Dhaka. The road was named after Bampfylde Fuller, the first lieutenant governor of Eastern Bengal and Assam. In 1967, Dhaka Municipality renamed it Sir Syed Ahmed Road, but it is still widely known as Fuller Road. The road starts from VC Square, where it junctions with Nilkhet Road, and ends at Shadhinota Sangram Monument Square, where it meets Shahid Minar Road.

Landmarks include:

- Vice-Chancellor of the University of Dhaka's residence
- British Council Bangladesh
- Udayan Higher Secondary School
- Salimullah Muslim Hall
- Jagannath Hall

== Faculties and departments ==
The university consists of 13 faculties and 83 departments.

=== Faculty of Arts ===
- Department of Bangla
- Department of English
- Department of Arabic
- Department of Persian Language and Literature
- Department of Urdu
- Department of Sanskrit
- Department of Pali
- Department of Buddhist Studies
- Department of Linguistics
- Department of Philosophy
- Department of History
- Department of Islamic Studies
- Department of Islamic History and Culture
- Department of Information Science and Library Management
- Department of World Religions and Culture
- Department of Theatre and Performance Studies
- Department of Music
- Department of Dance

=== Faculty of Social Sciences ===
- Economics
- Political Science
- International Relations
- Anthropology
- Public Administration
- Mass Communication and Journalism
- Communication Disorders
- Printing and Publication Studies
- Television, Film and Photography
- Sociology
- Development Studies
- Criminology
- Japanese Studies
- Women and Gender Studies
- Peace and Conflict Studies

=== Faculty of Law ===
- Department of Law

=== Faculty of Fine Arts ===
- Ceramics
- Craft
- Drawing and Painting
- Graphic Design
- Oriental Art
- Printmaking
- Sculpture
- History of Art

=== Faculty of Business Studies ===
The Faculty of Business Studies (FBS) was established in 1970 as the Faculty of Commerce. It began its journey with two departments: the Department of Accounting and the Department of Management. Two more departments were created in 1974, and the authority introduced the semester system from the 1977–1978 session. The names of the B.Com and M.Com degrees were changed to BBA and MBA, respectively, during the 1994–1995 session. Following its rebranding as the Faculty of Business Studies, four other departments were added to this faculty over the course of the next 13 years. In 1995, the Faculty of Commerce took its current name and became the Faculty of Business Studies.

Muhammad Abdul Moyeen became the acting dean of the Faculty of Business Studies in May 2020.

Currently, there are nearly 153 teachers, 10 officers, 58 employees, and nearly 6,100 students under the faculty. The departments are as follows:

- Accounting and Information Systems
- Management
- Marketing
- Finance
- Banking and Insurance
- Management Information Systems
- Tourism and Hospitality Management
- International Business
- Organization Strategy and Leadership

=== Faculty of Science ===
- Mathematics
- Applied Mathematics
- Physics
- Chemistry
- Statistics
- Biomedical Physics and Technology
- Theoretical Physics
- Theoretical and Computational Chemistry

=== Faculty of Pharmacy ===
- Pharmacy
- Clinical Pharmacy and Pharmacology
- Pharmaceutical Chemistry
- Pharmaceutical Technology

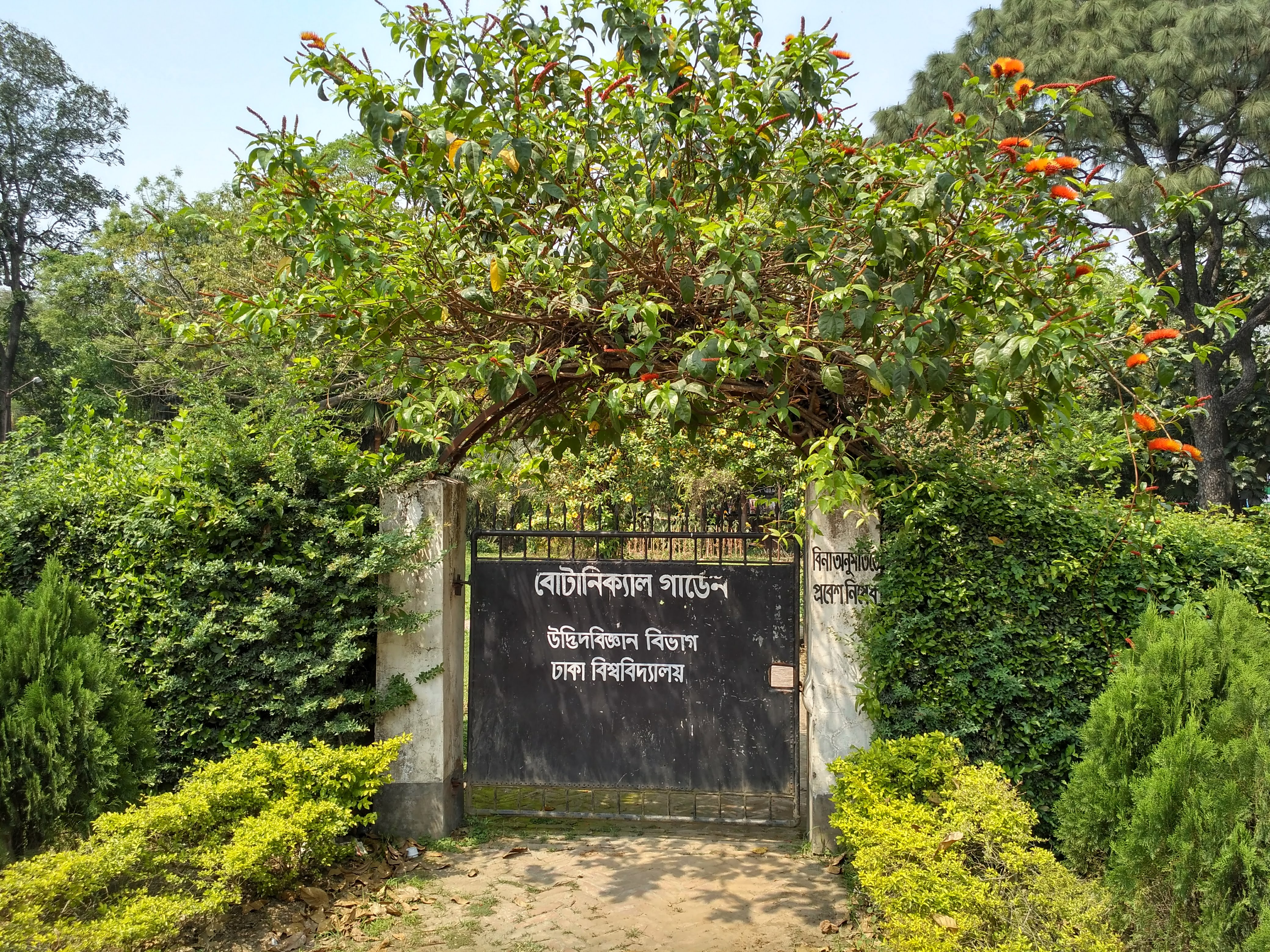
Botanical Garden, Department of Botany

=== Faculty of Biological Sciences ===
- Botany
- Zoology
- Biochemistry and Molecular Biology
- Microbiology
- Psychology
- Clinical Psychology
- Educational psychology
- Genetic Engineering and Biotechnology
- Soil, Water and Environment
- Fisheries

=== Faculty of Earth and Environmental Sciences ===
- Geography and Environment
- Geology
- Oceanography
- Disaster Science and Climate Resilience
- Meteorology

=== Faculty of Engineering and Technology ===
- Electrical and Electronic Engineering
- Applied Chemistry and Chemical Engineering
- Computer Science and Engineering
- Nuclear Engineering
- Robotics and Mechatronics Engineering

=== Faculty of Education ===
- Department of Mechanical Engineering

=== Faculty of Medicine ===
- Department of Medicine and Surgery

=== Faculty of Postgraduate Medical Sciences and Research ===
- Department of Virology

== Research and development facilities ==
=== Institutes of Dhaka University ===
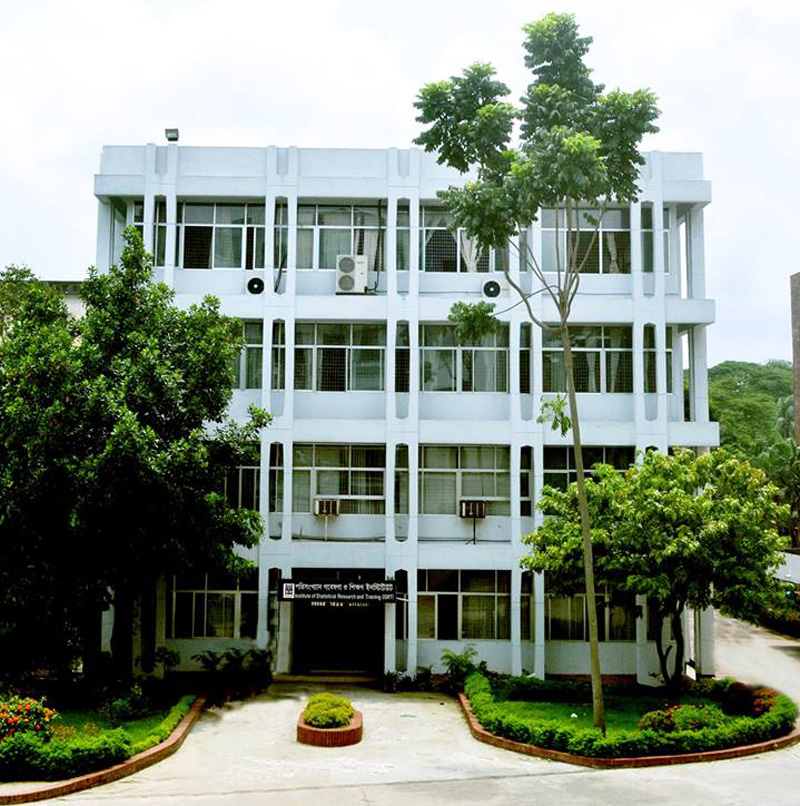
Institute of Statistical Research and Training (ISRT)

1. Education and Research
2. Statistical Research and Training
3. Business Administration
4. Social Welfare and Research
5. Modern Languages
6. Information Technology
7. Energy
8. Disaster Management and Vulnerability Studies
9. Nutrition and Food Science
10. Health Economics
11. Leather Engineering and Technology

=== Research centres ===
1. Bureau of Economic Research
2. Bureau of Business Research
3. Bose Centre for Advanced Study and Research in Natural Sciences
4. Renewable Energy Research Centre
5. Delta Research Centre
6. Material Chemistry Research Lab

== Dhaka Viswavidyalay Patrika ==
Dhaka Viswavidyalay Patrika
- Editor: Serajul Islam Choudhury (1973–1988)
- Categories: Research
- Frequency: Quarterly
- Publisher: University of Dhaka
- First issue: December 1973
- Company: Dhaka University Press
- Country: Bangladesh
- Based in: Dhaka
- Language: Bangla
- Website: official website
- ISSN: 2411-9059 (print); 3006-3078 (web)

Dhaka Viswavidyalay Patrika (Bengali: ঢাকা বিশ্ববিদ্যালয় পত্রিকা; alternate spelling: Dhaka Bishwabiddyaloy Patrika) is an open-access peer-reviewed academic research journal published since 1973 and funded by the University of Dhaka. The scholarly journal publishes research articles written in Bengali on literature, history, religion, philosophy, fine arts, music, business, law, science, social science, biology, economics, and politics. Serajul Islam Choudhury was the founding editor of this journal.

=== Publication history ===
The first issue was published in December 1973. From 1973 to 1976, it was published once a year as an annual publication. From 1977 to 1983, it was published twice a year as a semi-annual. It was published twice in 1984, as June and October issues. Since 1985, the journal has been published regularly in February, June, and October.

=== Review system ===
Researchers are invited to submit two copies of manuscripts on different subjects. In addition to the chief editor, an editorial board selects manuscripts for publication. Selected articles are sent to relevant subject experts for review and, based on their opinion, are published. After its establishment, the paper used to publish the research articles of Dhaka University teachers, researchers, and affiliated college teachers; since 1997, the writings of researchers outside the university have been accepted and published.

== Student life ==
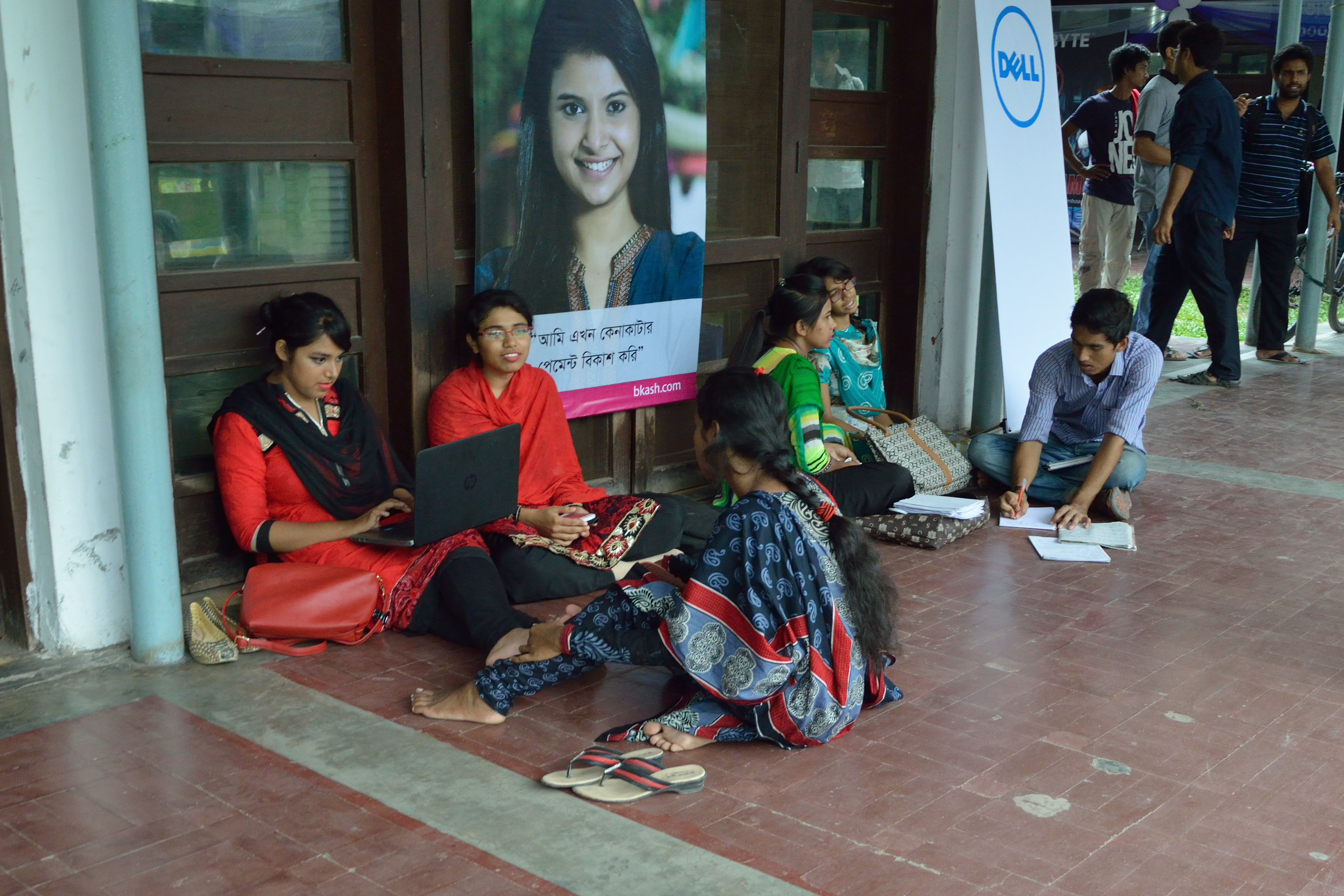
Students gossiping at the Teacher-Student Centre (TSC)

The University of Dhaka organises sports and other extracurricular and recreational activities. The Office of the Director of Physical Education provides three types of programmes:

- Compulsory Physical Education;
- Certificate course in coaching major games and sports; and
- Intramural and extramural programmes.

The University of Dhaka Ground is the official stadium of the University of Dhaka. It hosts many inter-collegiate and intra-collegiate sports tournaments at inter-city and national levels.

=== Intramural and extramural programmes ===
The directorate organises and conducts inter-departmental and inter-hall tournaments, individual hall athletics, Dhaka University athletics, and inter-university games and sports. Students participate in national championships in games and sports for which prior training and coaching are offered.

- Dhaka University football team

=== Dhaka University Central Students' Union ===
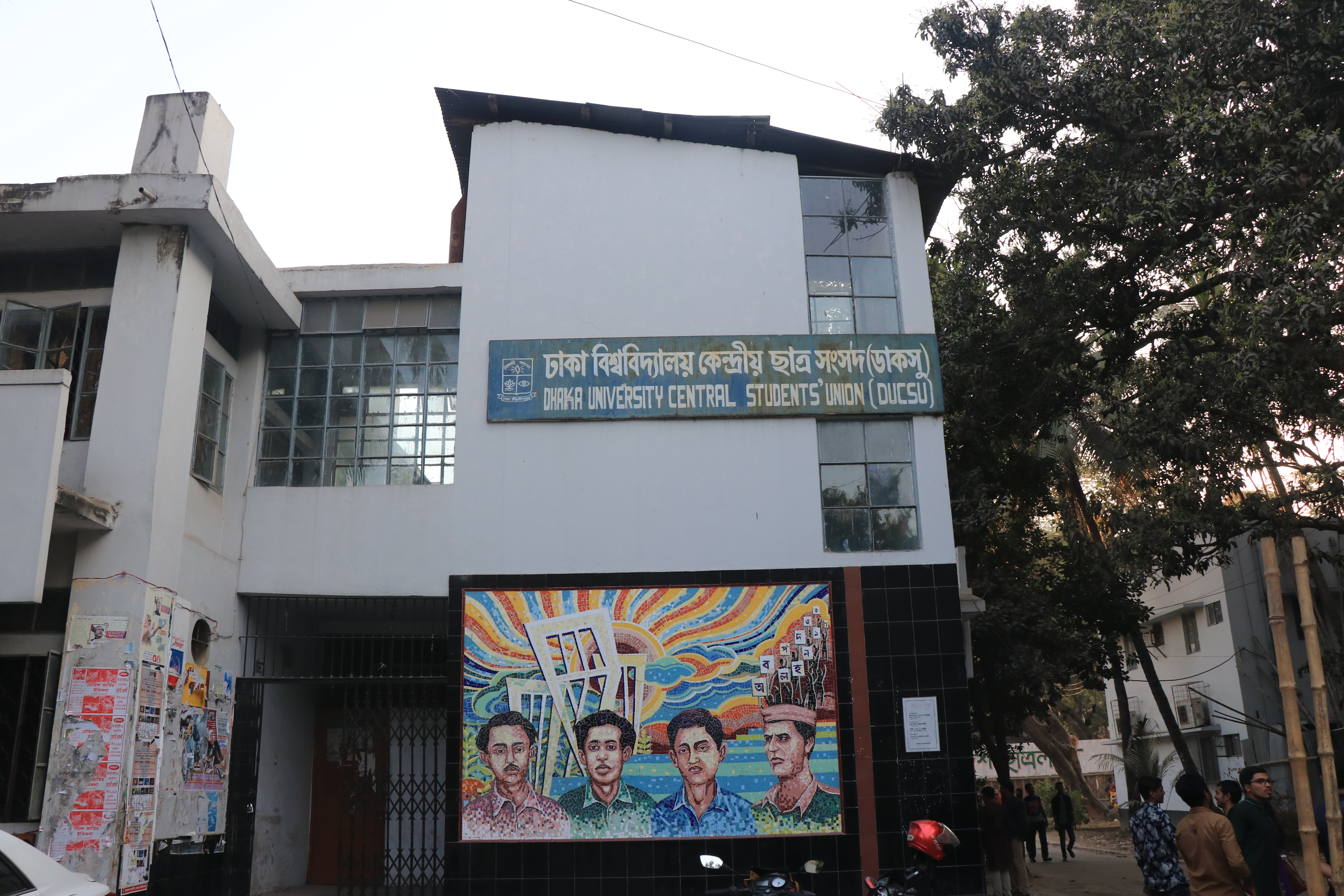
DUCSU HQ

The Dhaka University Central Students' Union is the official students' union of the University of Dhaka. It is better known in Bangladesh as DUCSU. It exists to represent Dhaka University students in the university's decision-making, to act as the voice for students in the national higher education policy debate, and to provide direct services to the student body. It was established in the academic year of 1922–23 as the Dhaka University Student Union. Its first constitution was drafted in its general assembly on 30 October 1925. In 1953, its constitution was amended, and the union was renamed the Dhaka University Central Students' Union. In 2019, the last DUCSU election took place after 29 years. Since then, DUCSU has been working for the welfare of the students.

== Rankings ==
=== International rankings ===
In 2011–12, the University of Dhaka was included in the list of 'Top World Universities' by QS World University Rankings. Out of over 30,000 universities around the world, DU was placed at 551. In 2014–15, the University of Dhaka was ranked 701st by QS World University Rankings (formerly Times Higher Education–QS World University Rankings). In 2015–16, Times Higher Education partnering with Elsevier ranked the university at 654th position among the top 800 globally reputed universities. In September 2015, QS World University Rankings published their 2015 edition of World University Rankings of 2015/16 and ranked DU at 126th position in Asia and in the 701–750 band in the world. In the Times Higher Education 2018 Global University Ranking, the University of Dhaka was placed in the 1001+ position among world universities.

=== Asian level rankings ===
In the 2026 QS Asia University Rankings, the University of Dhaka was ranked 132nd in Asia. Times Higher Education ranked the University of Dhaka in the 191–200 band in the 2016 Asia University Ranking.

In the Best Asian (and Australian) Universities ranking, Asiaweek ranked the University of Dhaka 37th in 1999 and 64th (overall and multi-disciplinary category) out of 77 ranked universities in 2000.

In 2000, the university received a comparatively higher rank in student selectivity (23rd) while receiving lower rankings in academic reputation (74th), faculty resources (59th), research (65th), and financial resources (74th).

According to the subject-specific ranking by the QS World University Rankings by Subject 2015 – English Language & Literature, only two South Asian universities, including the University of Dhaka (ranked 251–300), were included in the rankings.

== Administration ==
=== Vice-chancellors ===
The first vice-chancellor of the university was Philip Hartog. There have been 30 vice-chancellors of the University of Dhaka. The current vice-chancellor is A B M Obaidul Islam.

=== Pro-vice-chancellors ===
- Sayema Haque Bidisha

=== Treasurer ===
- The first honorory Treasurer was J. H. Lindsay ICS. Current Treasurer is M. Jahangir Alam Chowdhury

=== Registrar ===
- The first Registrar was Khan Bahadur Nazir Uddin Ahmad. Current Registrar is Munshi Shams Uddin Ahmed.

=== Controller of Examinations ===
- The first Controller of Examinations was Khan Sahib Abdur Rab Choudhury. Current Controller of Examinations is Dr. Himadri Shekhar Chakraborty

== Controversies ==
On 21 December 2023, the university of Dhaka administration faced pressure from a group demanding cancellation of the transgender quota in the undergraduate program admission test. The administration immediately conceded to their demands and apologized for "promoting transgender ideology." On 03 August 2026, following several incidents involving the formation of mobs against homosexual people in the university campus, the university of Dhaka administration referred to homosexuality as "moral misconduct" and informed media that they plan on introducing a formal policy that specifies disciplinary measures against people accused of homosexuality.

In 2026, during the Eid Al Adha, in a podcast, Minister of State for Primary and Mass Education of Bangladesh Bobby Hajjaj criticized the University of Dhaka, describing it as a coaching centre due to a lack of quality research and plagiarism from teachers. He later withdrew his remarks following protests by DU students.

== See also ==
- List of Islamic educational institutions
- List of universities in Bangladesh
- Association of Commonwealth Universities
- Jahangirnagar University (JU)
- University of Rajshahi (RU)
- University of Chittagong (CU)
