= Mohammad Abdul Haque =

Bangladeshi politician

- মোহম্মদ আব্দুল হক

Minister of Land Administration and Land Reforms
- In office 1985–1986

Member of the Bangladesh Parliament for Sylhet-10
- In office 18 February 1979 – 24 March 1982
- Preceded by: Mohammad Abdul Latif
- Succeeded by: Mahmudur Rahman Majumdar (as Sylhet-5)

Chairman of Road Transport Corporation
- In office 1965–1969

Personal details
- Born: 1 January 1918 Zakiganj, Sylhet District, Assam Province, British India
- Died: 6 April 1996 (aged 78) Dhaka, Bangladesh
- Resting place: Banani, Dhaka
- Party: Janadal Party; Bangladesh Nationalist Party
- Relatives: Fazlul Qadir Chaudhry (brother-in-law); AKM Fazlul Kabir Chowdhury (brother-in-law); H. N. Ashequr Rahman (son-in-law)
- Education: Murari Chand College
- Awards: Sitara-i-Khidmat (1969); Tamgha-i-Pakistan (1963)

Mohammad Abdul Haque (1 January 1918 – 6 April 1996) was a Bangladeshi bureaucrat, author and government minister.

== Early life and education ==
Haque was born on 1 January 1918 in the village of Kamalpur in Zakiganj, Sylhet District in the then Assam Province, British India to Mohammad Sabzan Ali and Sakina Khatun. He graduated from Murari Chand College in 1942 with a Bachelor of Arts in English.

== Career ==
Haque passed the Assam Public Service Commission examination in 1943 and was appointed to the police with the rank of deputy superintendent. He opted to join the Pakistan Police Service after the Partition of India in 1947. He served as the district superintendent of police of Dhaka District, Mymensingh District, Noakhali District, and Rangpur District. In 1959, he was awarded the President Police Medal. In 1960, he was made the additional inspector general of police. He was awarded the Tamgha-i-Pakistan in 1963. From 1965 to 1969, he served as the chairman of the Road Transport Corporation. He received the Sitara-i-Khidmat award from the government of Pakistan in 1969.

Haque founded a hospital after retirement. His hospital served as a shelter for civilians during the Bangladesh Liberation War.

Haque joined politics in the 1970s and was elected to the Jatiya Sangsad in 1979 as an independent candidate. From 1985 to 1986, he served as the Minister of Land Administration and Land Reforms in the cabinet of President Hussain Muhammad Ershad. Although he served as the acting president of the Janadal Party from 1985 to 1986, he retired from politics in 1987. Abdul Haque received the Bhasani Medal and Sher-e-Bangla Medal award for his philanthropic contribution.

== Works ==
Haque has authored several works including:

- Rahugrasta Bangladesh
- Deshta Ki Rasatale Jabe
- Srishtir Sera Shoto Manob
- Daridrya Bimochan
- Yahya’s Master Plan

== Personal life and death ==
Haque was married to Khurshida Haque (d. 2011), a social worker.

Per a 2020 interview in Elle magazine, Haque's granddaughter is an Australian-Canadian writer, poet, artist, and cultural critic, Fariha Róisín. Some have dispusted this claim.

Haque died on 6 April 1996 in Dhaka. He was buried in Banani graveyard and M. A. Haque Foundation was established in his honour.
