= Abdus Salam (Sylhet politician) =

Bangladeshi politician (1906–1999)

Moulvi Abdus Salam

Minister of Revenue in East Pakistan
- In office 1962–1964
- Preceded by: Kafiluddin Chowdhury
- Succeeded by: Fazlul Bari

Member of the East Pakistan Provincial Assembly
- In office 1962–1965
- In office 1957–1958

Member of the Assam Legislative Assembly for Sylhet Sadar-N
- In office 1937–1946
- Preceded by: Abdul Hamid
- Succeeded by: Ibrahim Ali

Personal details
- Born: 11 January 1906 Sylhet District, Eastern Bengal and Assam, British India
- Died: 10 May 1999 (aged 93) Sylhet, Bangladesh
- Party: BML
- Other political affiliations: PMLC (1962–1971); PML (1947–1958); AIML (pre-1947)

Moulvi Abdus Salam (Bengali: আবদুস সালাম; 11 January 1906 – 10 May 1999) was a Bangladeshi politician and member of the Assam Legislative Assembly. He was later a member of the East Bengal Provincial Assembly and the Revenue Minister in East Bengal from 1954 to 1962.

== Early life and education ==
Abdus Salam was born on 11 January 1906 to a Bengali Muslim family in the village of Sonapur in Kanaighat Thana, Sylhet District, Eastern Bengal and Assam, British India. His father's name was Munshi Hazir Ali and mother's name was Alekjan Begum. He completed his primary education from Birdal Primary School in 1918, before proceeding to join the Kanaighat Government Middle English School in 1922. In 1931, he passed first class from Jhingabari Alia Madrasa. He received his Intermediate of Arts in 1933 and Bachelor of Arts in 1936, both from the Murari Chand College in Sylhet. Abdus Salam received his Master of Arts from Aligarh Muslim University.

== Career ==
Abdus Salam was elected as a member of the Assam Legislative Assembly on 19 January 1937, during his days as a student. In 1954, he was appointed as the president of the Sylhet District Muslim League. He successfully won a seat in the East Bengal Legislative Assembly in 1954 as a Muslim League politician as well as becoming the Revenue and Land Administration Minister for East Bengal. During the 1979 Bangladeshi general election, he competed as a Bangladesh Muslim League candidate but was unsuccessful. He was elected as the president of the Bangladesh Muslim League's Sylhet District branch in 1976.

== Death ==
Abdus Salam died in Sylhet on 10 May 1999.
