= Khwaja Nizamuddin Bhuyan =

Bangladeshi officer in the Gonobahini

Khwaja Nizamuddin Bhuiyan BU
- Born: February 19, 1949; Comilla, East Bengal, Pakistan
- Died: September 4, 1971 (aged 22); Sylhet, Bangladesh
- Military career
- Allegiance: Bangladesh
- Branch: Gonobahini
- Commands: Sub Commander of Sector – IV
- Conflicts: Bangladesh Liberation War †
- Awards: Bir Uttom

Khwaja Nizamuddin Bhuiyan (Bengali: খাজা নিজামউদ্দিন ভূইয়া) was a Bangladeshi officer in the Gonobahini who was killed fighting in the Bangladesh Liberation War. He was awarded Bir Uttam, the second-highest military award in Bangladesh. He won the Independence Award in 2023 for his contribution to the field of Independence and Liberation War.

== Early life ==
Bhuiyan was born in Malapara, Comilla, East Pakistan, Pakistan, on 19 February 1949. He graduated from G. M Sen Institute in 1964 and from Comilla Victoria College in 1966. He finished his undergraduate and graduate studies in communication at the University of Dhaka in 1969 and 1970 respectively.

== Career ==
Bhuyan joined InterContinental Dhaka as a controller of accounts. After the start of the Bangladesh Liberation War on 25 March 1971, he decided to join the war effort in April. He went to Indranagar, Agartala, India, to receive military training. He joined the Gonobahini and was appointed captain in Sector 4. He fought a number of guerrilla battles in Sylhet district with the Pakistan Army.

== Death and legacy ==
Bhuyan had a direct confrontation with the Pakistan Army in Atgram Road, Kanaighat, on 4 September 1971. He was killed in the fighting. The Government of Bangladesh awarded him the gallantry award of 'Bir Uttam' posthumously. The Mokimtila Road market was named Nizam Nagar after him. Shaheed Khwaja Nizamuddin Bir Uttam Sarak in Comilla was named after him. Bir Uttam Shaheed Khwaja Nizamuddin Bhuyan Road was named after him in Dhaka.
