= Husam Uddin Chowdhury Fultali =

Bangladeshi Islamic Scholar, Author and Politician

Muhtaram Rahbar Mawlana Muhammad Husam-ud-Din Chowdhury Fultali
- মুহাম্মদ হুসাম উদ্দিন চৌধুরী ফুলতলী
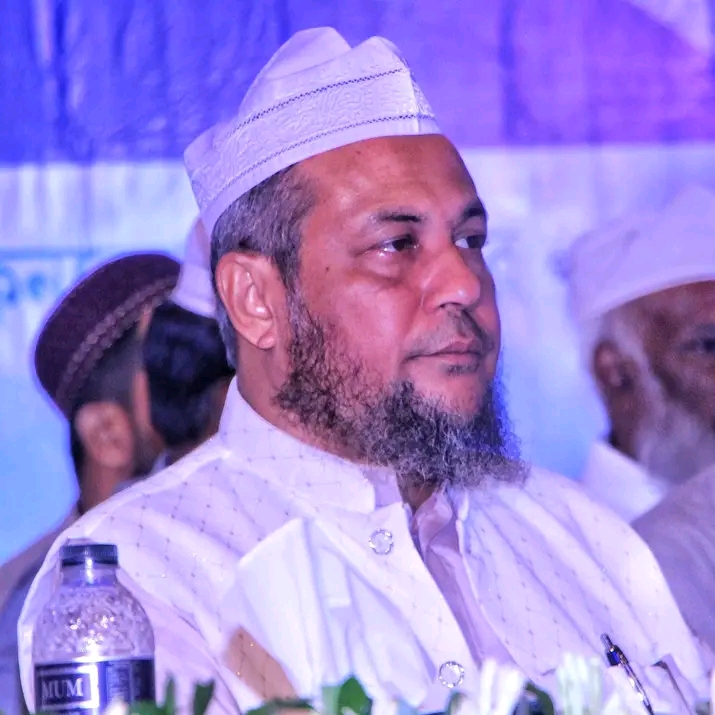

Personal life
- Born: Muhammad Husam-ud-Din Chowdhury; 5 February 1974 (age 52) Zakiganj, Sylhet District, Bangladesh
- Parent(s): Abdul Latif Chowdhury Fultali (Father); Muhtarama Nihar-un-Nisa bint Muhammad Abdul Rashid Khan (Mother)
- Education: Badedeorail Fultali Kamil Madrasa

Religious life
- Religion: Islam
- Denomination: Sunni
- Jurisprudence: Hanafi
- Tariqa: Chishti (Nizami); Naqshbandi (Mujaddidi); Qadri

Muslim leader
- Disciple of: Abdul Latif Chowdhury Fultali

Member of Parliament
- In office 30 January 2024 – 6 August 2024
- Preceded by: Hafiz Ahmed Mazumder
- Succeeded by: Mufti Abul Hasan
- Constituency: Sylhet-5

Mawlana Muhammad Husam-ud-Din Chowdhury (Bengali: মোহাম্মদ হুছামুদ্দীন চৌধুরী ফুলতলী; born 5 February 1974) is a Prominent Bangladeshi Islamic scholar and author. Youngest Son of The Prominent Sufi Saint Shams-ul-Ulama Allamah Muhammad Abdul Latif Chowdhury Fultali (R.A) and Grandson of The Prominent Hanafi Faqih Mufti Mawlana Muhammad Abdul Majid Chowdhury Naqshbandi Mujaddidi (R.A). He was former member of the Bangladesh Parliament from Sylhet-5. Mawlana Muhammad Husam-ud-Din Chowdhury Fultali serves as the President of Bangladesh Anjumane Al Islah (Non-Political Organization).

== Early life and education ==
Mawlana Muhammad Husam-ud-Din Chowdhury Fultali was born on 5 February 1974 to a Bengali Muslim Sufi family in the village of Fultali, located in Zakiganj Sylhet District, Bangladesh. He is the youngest son of the Islamic scholar Allamah Abdul Latif Chowdhury Fultali and was educated at the Badedeorail Fultali Kamil Madrasa.

== Career ==
Mawlana Muhammad Husam-ud-Din Chowdhury Fultali is an Islamic scholar and tours across Bangladesh, India, United States, and the United Kingdom. He has authored several books and is the founding editor of the Parwana monthly magazine.

=== Political career ===
Mawlana Muhammad Husam-ud-Din Chowdhury Fultali is the current president of Bangladesh Anjumane Al Islah and formerly its general secretary. Following the revocation of the special status of Jammu and Kashmir in 2019, he declared that all Indian aggression on Kashmir must be stopped. During an Anjumane Al Islah UK conference in Oldham, Greater Manchester, he called upon the government of Bangladesh to condemn the controversial remarks of Indian politicians about Muhammad.

In the 2018 Bangladeshi general election, Chowdhury endorsed the Bangladesh Awami League-led Grand Alliance on behalf of his organization Bangladesh Anjumane Al Islah.

Mawlana Muhammad Husam-ud-Din Chowdhury Fultali visited the Prime Minister of Bangladesh Sheikh Hasina at the Ganabhaban on 6 December 2023 during the 2024 Bangladeshi general election campaign. He was elected to the Jatiya Sangsad as the MP for Sylhet-5 constituency on 7 January 2024. Fultali lost his position following the dissolution of the 12th Jatiya Sangsad on 6 August 2024 as a result of the July Uprising.

In the 2026 Bangladeshi general election, he officially endorsed BNP nominated MP candidate Khandokar Abdul Muktadir for the Sylhet-1 constituency on behalf of Bangladesh Anjumane Al Islah.
