= Mushahid Ahmad Bayampuri =

Pakistani Bengali Muslim theologian

Allama Muhammad Mushahid Ahmad Bayampuri
- মোহাম্মদ মুশাহিদ আহমদ

Personal life
- Born: 1907 Bayampur, Sylhet District, Assam Province, British Raj
- Died: 7 February 1971 (aged 63–64) Bayampur, Sylhet District, East Pakistan, Pakistan
- Political party: Jamiat Ulema-e-Islam; Convention Muslim League
- Education: Kanaighat Islamia Madrasa; Madrasa Aliya Rampur; Meerut Alia Madrasa; Darul Uloom Deoband

Religious life
- Religion: Islam
- Denomination: Sunni
- Jurisprudence: Hanafi

Muslim leader
- Teacher: Hussain Ahmad Madani, Shah Yaqub Badarpuri
- Influenced: Abu Saeed Muhammad Omar Ali, Alimuddin al-Sylheti, Jubaer Ahmad Ansari, Abdul Karim Kawria, Muhammad Muhibbur Rahman, Muhammad Ilyas Lakipuri, Imdad al-Haque Durlobpuri, Ubaydullah Faruq,

Member of the 3rd National Assembly of Pakistan
- In office 1962–1965
- President: Ayub Khan
- Preceded by: Faizul Hasan
- Succeeded by: Ajmal Ali Choudhury
- Constituency: Sylhet-II

Mushahid Ahmad Bayampuri (Bengali: মুশাহিদ আহমদ বায়মপুরী, Arabic: مشاهد أحمد البايمفوري; 1907–1971) was a late-twentieth century Bengali Islamic Hadith scholar, teacher, writer, jurist, orator and politician. He is often described by Bangladeshi scholars as the Bukhari of Bengal, and Shaykh al-Islam. Bayampuri served as a member of the National Assembly of Pakistan, the professor of Hadith studies at Sylhet Government Alia Madrasah, the principal of Darul Hadith Kanaighat and the president of the Eastern Sylhet Independent Religious Arabic Madrasah Education Board. His numerous works, which covered a range of disciplines in Islamic literature such as Hadith, Tafsir and the political aspects of Islam, were written in the Arabic, Bengali and Urdu languages. Some of his books are part of syllabic studies in the city of Madinah and under the Independent Religious Board of Education.

== Early life and education ==
Muhammad Mushahid Ahmad was born on a Friday in Muharram 1327 AH (1907 CE), in the village of Bayampur in Kanaighat, Sylhet District, a village known for its principled islamic adherence, religious upbringing and home to many scholars. Both of his parents were Sunni Bengalis. His father, Alim bin Danish Mian, was a qari, while his mother, Sufia Begum, was a hafiza known for her piety and modesty. She played a prominent part in her son’s upbringing and early education. He was the second of their three sons, and they were raised by their mother following the death of his father during his childhood. Bayampuri was known among the locals as Kalamanik, a moniker reflecting his notably dark complexion and prominent nose.

Bayampuri was very intelligent from his childhood. Initially, Bayampuri studied the Qur'an, Bengali and Urdu with his mother. At the age of seven years he was then admitted to the village school. At the age of 10, after completing his primary education with great success, he was admitted to the then Kanaighat Islamia Madrasa (now Darul Hadith Kanaighat) and studied in the same madrasa for 7 years where he continued his Islamic studies under a structured curriculum learning the basics of the sciences.

He began his career as a teacher after completing his studies at the madrasa but returned to education later in North India. He studied for five years at the Madrasa Aliya of Rampur State and two years at the Alia Madrasa of Meerut. He wrote two books in this period, which were published under the name of his teacher, one of which was an explanation of Ibn Hajib’s kaafiyah, which was titled Idah al-Matalib. Although he went back to teaching in Bengal after these seven years, Mushahid later enrolled at the Darul Uloom Deoband in Saharanpur in 1936, where he studied Hadith under Hussain Ahmad Madani and other scholars, graduating with a degree whilst getting the highest mark in Hadith studies after one and a half years of studying there. His study on the Sahih of Imam Bukhari was so exceptional that it remarkably demonstrated his depth of knowledge and impressed his seniors, and it is reported that his examination answers on the topic where kept by the university.

In the certificate given to him, Shaykh Hussain Ahmad Madani wrote as a tazkiyyah (praise): “… Mr Muhammad Mushahid, a resident of Kanaighat in Sylhet district, has obtained the highest marks in the highest Jamaat of Hadith of Darul Uloom Deoband, where there were 180 students with special qualifications from outside India and from every district of India. He has been given various awards for being the first in the Jamaat. Allah Almighty has bestowed upon him many great and innate qualities. His intellect is very sharp and bright, his character is advanced and noble, and I have no doubt that he will be successful if given any teaching position

== Career ==
Bayampuri briefly taught at the Lalarchak Primary School before spending seven years in North India. He gave Hadith studies classes at the Alia madrasas of Badarpur and Rampur. Prior to his studies at Deoband, he taught at his local Lalarchar Rahmania Madrasa too.

When he returned to Bengal, he was offered a position as Shaykhul Hadith at the Sylhet Government Alia Madrasah. He also served in this position at the Gachhbari Jamiul Uloom Kamil Madrasa, however during his term here, as he did not get along well with the management, Bayampuri left the madrasa to join the Kanaighat Islamia Madrasa in 1953. He eventually became the principal and Shaykhul Hadith of this madrasa until his death, and renamed it to Darul Uloom Darul Hadith Kanaighat. In order to unite the madrasas of eastern Sylhet (Sylhet and Moulvibazar), he established the Azad Dini Arabic Madrasa Education Board in 1953. He served as the board's president for the rest of his life. The board now has authority over 175 madrasas. In Ramadan, he used to give lectures at the Bandarbazar Jame Mosque from tarawih to suhur.

=== Political career ===
As a student of Hussain Ahmad Madani, Bayampuri rejected the Pakistan Movement and Partition of India. After the independence of Pakistan in 1947, Bayampuri continued to be a part of the Jamiat Ulema-e-Islam. He participated in the 1962 basic elections as an independent candidate, defeating opponent Begum Serajunnessa Choudhury and successfully gaining a seat in the 3rd National Assembly of Pakistan, representing the Sylhet-II constituency.

During his term, he felt that the strength of Islamic parties were even close to the strength needed to change the political landscape. As a result, he joined Ayub Khan's Convention Muslim League for the greater good. He benefitted by taking grants from the government for funding Kanaighat Darul Hadith and the Akuni Madrasa of Sylhet. He lost his seat at the 1965 basic elections to Ajmal Ali Choudhury. At the 1970 Pakistani general elections, Bayampuri competed for the seat as a Jamiat Ulema-e-Islam candidate but failed for a second time.

During his time in parliament, Bayampuri petitioned for the erstwhile Republic of Pakistan to rename itself the Islamic Republic of Pakistan. He also believed that no law should be adopted by Pakistan that goes against the Qur'an and Sunnah. In the face of his demand, the Ayub Cabinet was forced to cancel the anti-Islamic clause from an ordinance. Bayampuri also called for the establishment of an Islamic university in East Pakistan. In one part of his political career, Bayampuri briefly left Pakistan for Assam in India due to political oppression. A Pakistani minister later invited him back to the country after a compromise by the King of Saudi Arabia.

== Works ==
Mushahid Ahmad has written a number of works in Arabic, Urdu and Bengali:

- al-Fatḥ al-Karīm fī Siyāsah an-Nabī al-Amīn (1948, Arabic and Urdu) (Translated into Bengali by Abu Saeed Muhammad Omar Ali as Islamer Raśṭrīyô O Ôrthônoitik Uttôradhikar)
- al-Laṭāʾif ar-Rabbāniyyah fī al-Āyāt al-Qurʾāniyyah
- īdah al-Matālib Sharh Kāfiyatu Ibn Hajib (first published under his teacher)
- al-Ziyadat al-Imānu wa Nuqsānuh
- Mas’alah Qira’a Khalf al-Imām
- Mas’alah Ru’ya al-Hilāl
- al-Furqān bayna al-Ḥaqq wa al-Bāṭil fī ʿIlm at-Taṣawwuf wa al-Iḥsān
- al-Furqān bayna Awliyāʾ ar-Raḥmān wa Awliyāʾ ash-Shayṭān
- al-Burhān fī Istiḥbāb Samāʿ al-Qurʼān
- Dawa al-Haqq (Refutation of Darul Ulum Karachi’s Fatwa on Qiyam al Layl)
- Śôtter Alo (Bengali, 2 volumes)
- Iẓhār-e-Ḥaqq

== Personal life ==
Bayampuri married 10 times and is the father of 11 children.

He completed Hajj three times. He became well known on an extremely broader scale for his scholarship and knowledge on Hadith by Saudi Arabian religious authorities in one of these occasions. During his presence in a Hajj sermon, one of the Imam’s of Makkah and Khatib had made mention of a prophetic narration in which he had erred, it is reported that the Imam had narrated a Hadith from Al-Tabarani whilst mistakenly attributing it to Musnad Ahmad ibn Hanbal, consequently from the crowd, Bayampuri stood up amongst everyone and corrected him. After witnessing this, the Khatib was impressed with the immense knowledge Bayampuri had possessed of the prophetic tradition. After finding out the knowledge Bayampuri possessed in Hadith, the Saudi Arabian Government enabled the King of Saudi Arabia to have the state constitution reviewed by Bayampuri to see where it could be amended. Bayampuri suggested that it be amended at 14 places.

He was requested by the government of Saudi Arabia to stay in the country and take up teaching positions as his knowledge would be of immense benefit. He was also approached by a group of people from the renowned Azhar University of Egypt for the same request. However, after performing istikhara, he had decided not to take up the offers and that it would be befitting for him to go back to his homeland and carry on teaching there. His relationship with the Saudi Government remained strong as he was supported by them for the oppression he faced in exile from his homeland on one occasion.

== Death and legacy ==
Bayampuri died in his village, on the night of Eid al-Adha on 7 February 1971. His janaza was performed by his younger brother Muzzammil Ahmad Bayampuri on Eid day, after the Asr prayer, and he was buried in front of Darul Hadith Kanaighat.

Bayampuri’s name and status as a religious figure, Islamic scholar, and friend of God would further grow after his death due to the many miracles surrounding his death and burial. It was a good sign that he had passed on the 10 days of Dhu al-Hijjah, reported in Islamic tradition as the 10 best and most virtuous days of the Islamic year. He had signalled his death to his loved ones as he indicated that his time was near through the deterioration of his health. He is reported to have repeated numerous times on his deathbed “Al-hiqnee bi al-rafiq al-a’la”, consequently passing on the night of Eid whilst witnessing the Day of Arafah one last time.

It was reported that a strong fragrance had emitted from his grave a few days after he got buried, locals witnessed this and would swarm to his grave, to which the scholars of the village had to supplicate for it to stop in suspicion of Shirk (Islam) and Bid'ah spreading, an incident similar to that of the death of Imam Muhammad al-Bukhari. Bayampuri’s grave was similarly reported to have emitted strong fragrances on two separate occasions after his death as well with locals witnessing, once in 2012, and once in 2020, to which the news spread to various regions of Bangladesh, and scholars approving of such miracle.

Bayampuri is widely remembered and often mentioned in religious lectures by Islamic Scholars in many Islamic seminaries and lectures.

A bridge on the Surma River in Kanaighat Upazila is named after Bayampuri. He has been praised by numerous scholars and is mentioned in various books. During Bayampuri's return from Assam to Sylhet, Hussain Ahmad Madani mentioned that "an enlightenment is going towards Sylhet". Abdul Karim Shaykh-e-Kouria mentioned that if all of the ilm of the scholars of Sylhet District were put together, they would match only up to the knee of Bayampuri.

His son, Sheikhzada Faruq Ahmad, contested in the 1973 Bangladeshi general elections, losing only to Habibur Rahman (Tota Mia).

== Bibliography ==
- Arafat, Nasim (2023). বাংলার ইমাম বুখারী আল্লামা মুশাহিদ বায়মপুরী [The Imam Bukhari of Bengal: Allama Mushahid Bayampuri] (in Bengali). Bangla Bazar, Dhaka: Maktabatul Huda Al Islamia.
- al-Kumillai, Muhammad Hifzur Rahman (2018). الشيخ الفاضل مولانا مشاهد بن القاري علم مِيَان السلهتي. كتاب البدور المضية في تراجم الحنفية (in Arabic). Cairo, Egypt: Dar al-Salih.

== See also ==
- List of Deobandis
