= Liaquat Ali Khan (officer) =

Freedom fighter from Bangladesh

- লিয়াকত আলী খান
- Born: 20 December 1948 (age 77); Bagerhat, East Bengal, Pakistan
- Spouse: Nazma Begum
- Military career
- Allegiance: Pakistan; Bangladesh
- Branch: Pakistan Air Force; Bangladesh Air Force
- Service years: 1964–1975
- Rank: Squadron leader
- Units: No. 27 Squadron PAF; 1st East Bengal Regiment
- Commands: Company Commander of Sector – VIII
- Conflicts: Bangladesh Liberation War
- Awards: Bir Uttom
- Other work: Bangladesh Biman

Liaquat Ali Khan (Bengali: লিয়াকত আলী খান) is a freedom fighter of the Bangladesh Liberation War. The Bangladesh government awarded him the title of Bir Uttom for his bravery in the independence war.

== Birth and education ==
Liaquat Ali Khan was born in Amlapara, Sarai Road, Bagerhat Municipality, Bagerhat District. His father's name was Atahar Ali Khan and his mother's name was Aziza Khatun. His wife's name is Nazma Anwar Begum. They have one daughter and one son.

== Career ==
In 1971, Liaquat Ali Khan was working in Pakistan (then West Pakistan). When the war of liberation started, he came to Bangladesh at the end of May saying that his father was ill. A few days later, he went to India and joined the war of liberation. Shortly afterwards he was promoted to the rank of Adjutant of the 1st East Bengal Regiment of the regular forces. In 1975, in the event of a counter-coup, compulsory retirement from the Bangladesh Air Force was granted. He later worked in the Middle East. He then worked as a pilot in Bangladesh Biman.

Liaquat Ali Khan was given compulsory retirement from the Bangladesh Air Force in 1975, due to a counter-coup. He later worked in the Middle East. After that he worked as a pilot in Bangladesh Biman. Currently working in a private airline.

== Role in the liberation war ==
Gauripur belongs to Kanaighat Upazila (then thana) of Sylhet District. Location of Thana Sadar on the bank of Surma River on Jaintapur-Zakiganj road. On the border of the Indian state of Meghalaya. Due to its location, Kanaighat was militarily important to both the Mukti Bahini and the Pakistan Army in 1971.

Kanaighat was a stronghold of the Pakistan Army. Their 31st Punjab Regiment was engaged in defense. There were also militias and razakars. This was the front line of defense of the Pakistan Army in late November. Because, at that time the front area of Kanaighat was occupied by the freedom fighters of Zakiganj, Atgram and Chargram.

After capturing Zakiganj, Atgram and Chargram, the freedom fighters continued to advance towards Sylhet. Liaquat Ali Khan was in this group of freedom fighters. On November 25, they reached Gauripur, two miles from the Kanaighat police station headquarters. They were divided into several groups. They took up positions at various places in Gauripur for the purpose of attacking Kanaighat.

On the morning of 26 November, the Pakistan Army suddenly attacked a group of freedom fighters (Alpha Company). In such a situation, there is no other way but counter-attack. The freedom fighters bravely faced the onslaught of the Pakistan army. But even after fighting valiantly, their condition became fragile. Captain Mahbubur Rahman was the captain of the affected freedom fighters. He was resolutely fighting the attack with his comrades. But at one stage he was martyred by the Pakistani army. In this situation Liaquat Ali Khan became the captain on the battlefield. At one stage, he was also wounded by enemy bullets.

This battle is described in the statement of Captain Hafizuddin Ahmed (Bir Bikram, later Major). "In the morning, the Pakistani 31st Punjab Regiment attacked our 'A' company position," he said. Company 'A' thwarted the Pakistani attack with utmost determination.

In this battle, 100 soldiers including a major and a captain of the Pakistan Army were killed. On the Bangladeshi side, 10-11 people including Captain Mahbub were martyred and about 20 people were injured. After the martyrdom of Captain Mahbub, Flight Lieutenant Liaquat Ali was appointed the commander of the company. He was a former Pakistan Air Force pilot. He had no previous experience in such infantry. Shortly afterwards he was wounded by enemy bullets. Injured, he fought valiantly for a long time.

Liaquat Ali Khan was awarded the title of Bir Uttam for his courage and valor in the war of liberation. According to the official gazette of 1973, his Heroism Review Number is 73.

== Awards and honors ==
- Bir Uttom

== Footnotes ==
- This article has been translated from the original report titled "তোমাদের এ ঋণ শোধ হবে না" published on 03 June 2012 in The Daily Prothom Alo. The Daily Prothom Alo has released a Creative Commons Attribution-Share-Alike 3.0 international license on Wikipedia (Permitted). The reports were written by Rashedur Rahman (also known as Tara Rahman) on behalf of The Daily Prothom Alo Liberation War Trust.
