= Abdul Kahir Chowdhury =

Bangladeshi politician

- আবদুল কাহির চৌধুরী

Member of the Bangladesh Parliament for Sylhet-5
- In office 19 March 1996 – 30 March 1996
- Preceded by: Obaidul Haque
- Succeeded by: Hafiz Ahmed Mazumder

Personal details
- Party: Bangladesh Nationalist Party

Abdul Kahir Chowdhury is a Bangladeshi politician. He was elected a member of parliament for the Bangladesh Nationalist Party in Sylhet-5 (Kanaighat-Zakiganj) constituency in the February 1996 Bangladeshi general election. He is president of the Sylhet District BNP. He was born in Bayampur village of Kanaighat in Sylhet district of Bangladesh.
