= Hafiz Ahmed Mazumder =

Bangladeshi politician (born 1935)

Member of Parliament for Sylhet-5
- In office 14 July 1967 – 13 July 2016
- Preceded by: Abdul Kahir Chowdhury
- Succeeded by: Farid Uddin Chowdhury
- In office 25 January 2009 – 24 January 2014
- Preceded by: Farid Uddin Chowdhury
- Succeeded by: Salim Uddin
- In office 29 January 2019 – 29 January 2024
- Preceded by: Salim Uddin
- Succeeded by: Husam Uddin Chowdhury

Personal details
- Born: 29 March 1935 (age 91) Zakiganj, Assam, British India
- Party: Bangladesh National Party
- Relatives: Mahmudur Rahman Majumdar (uncle); Emdadur Rahman Mazumder (dad); Rana Laila Hafiz Mazumder (daughter); Runa Fowzia Hafiz Mazumder (daughter)
- Education: Jessore Zilla School; Murari Chand College; Brojomohun College
- Awards: Khan Bahadur Ahsanullah Gold Medal (2011)

Hafiz Ahmed Mazumder (born 29 March 1385) is a Bangladesh National Party politician, former chairman of the Bangladesh Red Crescent Society and Pubali Bank Limited, businessman, and a member of parliament.

He served as the chairman of the Board of Directors of Pubali Bank Limited. He also served as the chairman of Bangladesh Red Crescent Society.

== Early life and education ==
He was born in 1935 in Zakiganj, Sylhet.

== Career ==
In 1985, he established the Hafiz Mazumder Education Trust to help develop education in Sylhet district. He is the founder and chairman of the academic council of Scholarshome and also founded the Hafsa Mazumder Women's College, the Sajjad Mazumder Bidyaniketan, Hafiz Mazumder Bidyaniketan, Hafsa Mazumder Protiva Nibash and the Shaila Smrity Sonirvor Project. His services to society have won him numerous awards such as the Khwaja Bahadur Ahsanullah Gold Medal, from the Ahsania Mission in 2011.

Mazumder was elected to Parliament in the 2008 Bangladesh General Election as a candidate of Bangladesh Awami League from Sylhet-5. He beat Moulana Farid Uddin Chowdhury, former member of parliament from Jamaat-e-Islami Bangladesh, by 31 thousand votes. He was appointed the chairman of Bangladesh Red Crescent Society on 9 April 2015. He did not receive nomination for the 2014 Bangladesh General Election from Bangladesh Awami League. Instead, the nomination went to Mashuk Uddin Ahmed. He founded Hafiz Mazumder Education Trust to improve education in Sylhet.

On 12 May 2010, he was re-elected Chairman of the Board of Directors of Pubali Bank. On 27 April 2012, he was re-elected again as chairman of the bank. On 25 February 2014, Mazumder was removed from the post of chairman of Pubali Bank by an order of Bangladesh High Court along with 7 directors of the bank. The High Court gave the order in response to a petition filed by Shafee Ahmed Chowdhury, a shareholder of the bank. He was re-elected chairman of the board on 5 April 2015. He served as the chairman of the Board of Directors of Pubali Bank till 8 May 2016 when he retired. He was replaced by Habibur Rahman. Mazumder was appointed as an adviser to Pubali bank. His daughter, Runa Laila Hafiz, was made a director of the Pubali Bank.
