= Ghayebi Dighi Mosque =

Former mosque in Zakiganj, Sylhet, Bangladesh

- গায়েবী দিঘী মসজিদ
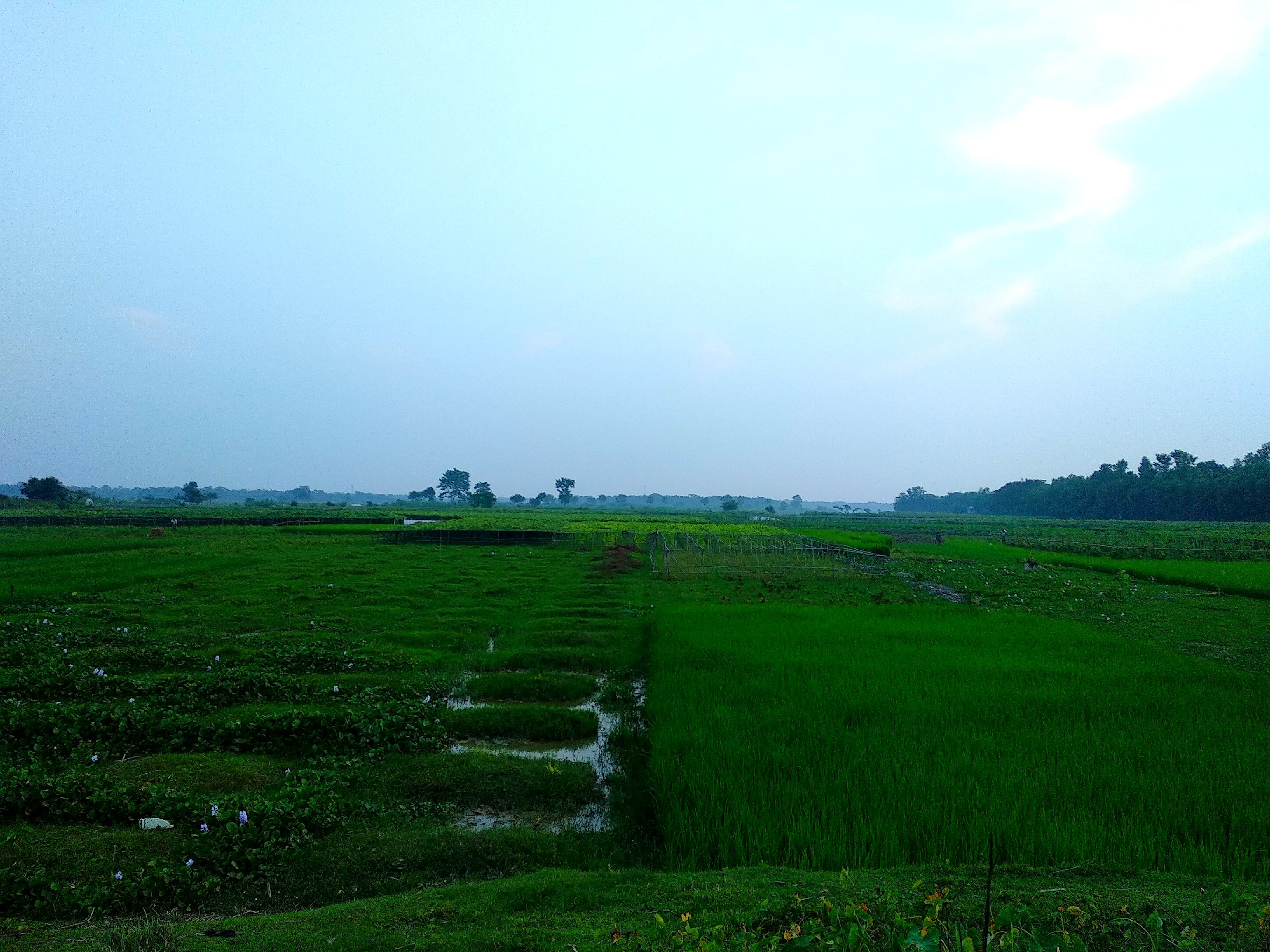

Religion
- Affiliation: Sunni Islam (former)
- Ecclesiastical or organizational status: Mosque (former)
- Status: Inactive (ruinous state)

Location
- Location: Barothakuri, Zakiganj, Sylhet
- Country: Bangladesh

The Ghayebi Dighi Mosque, (Bengali: গায়েবী দিঘী মসজিদ, Arabic: مسجد بركة الغائبي), was an ancient mosque in a ruinous state, located in what is now Barothakuri Union, Zakiganj Upazila in Sylhet District. It is an important site managed by the Department of Archaeology in Bangladesh.

== See also ==
- Islam in Bangladesh
- List of mosques in Bangladesh
- List of archaeological sites in Bangladesh
