= Ajiria Madrasa =

Madrasa in Sylhet, Bangladesh

Coordinates: 22.973°N 90.228°E

Ajiria Alia Madrasa আজিরিয়া আলিয়া মাদরাসা

Location
- Fulbari, Ward 6, Golapganj, Sylhet District; Bangladesh

Information
- Type: Madrasa
- Religious affiliation(s): Islam
- Established: Before 1860; 165 years ago
- Founder: Muhammad Ajiruddin Ahmad
- School board: Bangladesh Madrasah Education Board
- Language: Bengali, Arabic

Ajiria Alia Madrasa (Bengali: আজিরিয়া আলিয়া মাদরাসা, Arabic: المدرسة العالية الأجيرية) is an alia madrasa, situated in Fulbari, Golapganj Upazila, Sylhet District, Bangladesh.

== History ==
The descendants of Mughal statesman and zamindar Mir Hazara established a madrasa in the village of Fulbari. Among his descendants was the 19th-century mystic Shah Abdul Wahhab Choudhury, who headed up the madrasa immediately before it was transformed into its present form. His Sufi background turned the madrasa into a notable centre for the production of literary works in the Sylhet Nagri script, and among the erstwhile students were Sufi poets Shitalong Shah and Ibrahim Ali Tashna.

In 1860, Allama Muhammad Ajiruddin Ahmad Choudhury, a student of Abdul Wahhab Choudhury, used his family wealth to re-endow it and transform it into an Alia Madrasa, related to the style of the Alia Madrasa of Calcutta. From then on it came to be known as Ajiria Alia Madrasa. Ahmad was a renowned Persian-language author, and among his books are Guldasta-i-Aqaid and Aqaid-i-Ajiria (Creed of Ajiria). He also wrote books in Urdu. In the 20th century, Sufi Habibur Rahman Chowdhury became the headmaster. His son, Majd Uddin Chowdhury, was a prominent tea pioneer and former principal of Murari Chand College. He was also the father of Mohius Sunnah Chowdhury, who played a great role in the development of the madrasa.

The madrasa became an important centre for the Pakistan Movement, with key activities from its alumni Abdul Musabbir of Gohorpur, who founded the Sylhet District Muslim Student Association, and Sayad Naziruddin Ahmad of Balikandi. Other notable alumni include Ibrahim Chatuli and Ismail Alam. Notable teachers at the institute include the Deobandi cleric Maulana Abdul Jalil Choudhury, a leading opponent of Partition in the area who would eventually migrate to India in protest at the creation of Pakistan.

== See also ==
- Abdul Matin Chowdhury Shaikh-e-Fulbari
