= Khelafat Majlis =

Far-right political party in Bangladesh

Khelafat Majlis খেলাফত মজলিস
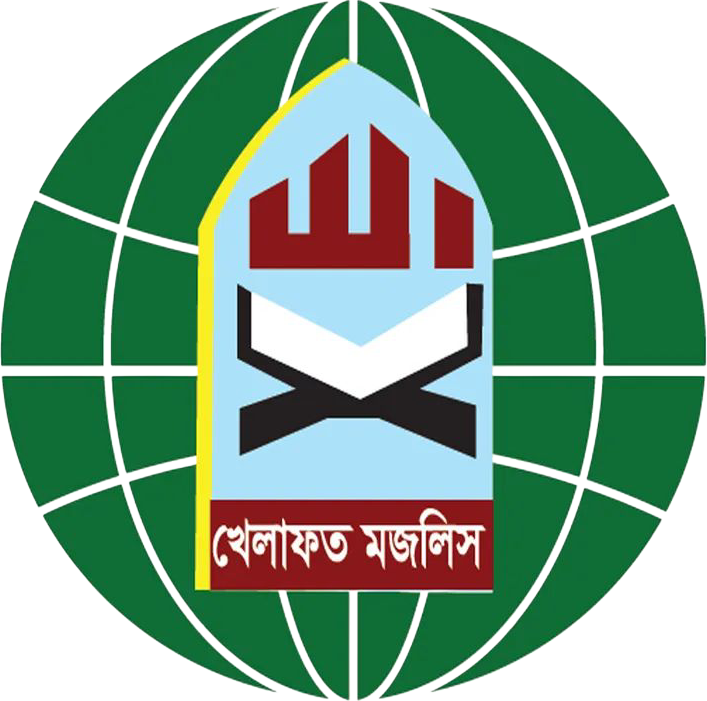
- Abbreviation: KM
- Leader: Abdul Basit Azad
- Secretary-General: Ahmad Abdul Qader
- Founded: 8 December 1989; 36 years ago
- Headquarters: Fayenaz Tower, Flat No. 11/A, 37/2 Purana Paltan (Paltan Calvert Road), Dhaka-1000, Dhaka
- Student wing: Bangladesh Islami Chhatra Majlis
- Youth wing: Khelafat Jubo Majlis
- Ideology: Islamism; Islamic fundamentalism; Pan-Islamism; Caliphatism; Social conservatism; Deobandism
- Political position: Far-right
- National affiliation: None Formerly: 11 Party Alliance (2025–26) 20 Party Alliance (1999–2021)
- Colors: Turquoise
- Bangladesh Parliament: 1 / 350

Election symbol
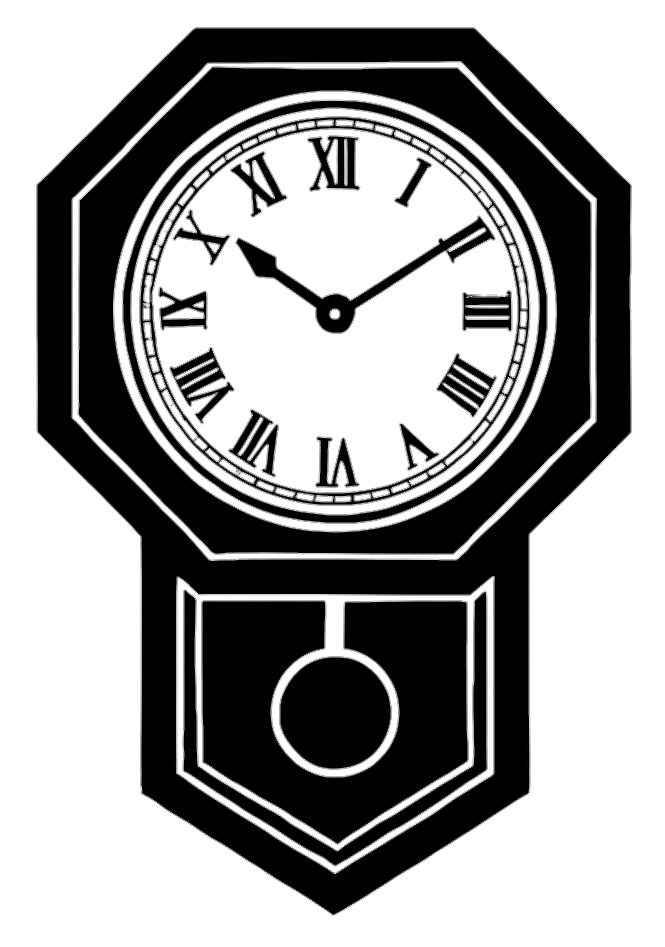
- Wall clock

Party flag
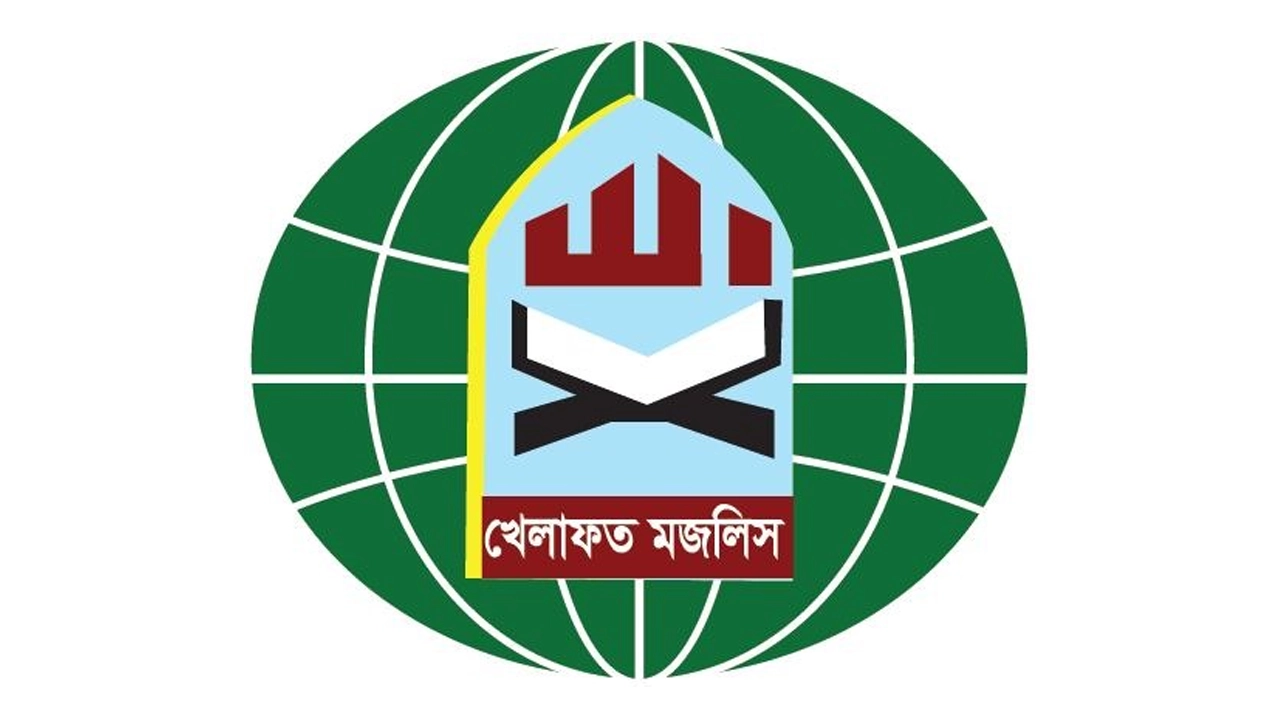

Khelafat Majlis (Bengali: খেলাফত মজলিস) is a far-right Islamist political party in Bangladesh. The party was founded in Dhaka, the capital of Bangladesh in 1989 by Azizul Haque along with Ahmad Abdul Qadir and former leaders of the National Awami Party and Tamaddun Majlish. Since its founding, it has only ever gained one seat in the country's National Parliament.

== History ==
The party was publicly established on 8 December 1989, during a national conference that was held at the IEB Auditorium in Dhaka. It was founded by Azizul Haque, who had left the Khilafat Andolan after the death of its founder, Muhammadullah Hafezzi. The party was founded as a union between Islami Jubo Shibir leader Ahmad Abdul Qadir, a splinter group of Abdul Hamid Khan Bhashani's National Awami Party and Tamaddun Majlish founder Masud Khan. Abdul Gaffar was selected as the party's inaugural amir, with Masud Khan serving as general secretary and Ahmad Abdul Qadir as vice-secretary. Azizul Haque headed the party's Central Guardian Council and shortly replaced Abdul Gaffar as amir, with A. R. M. Abdul Matin and Abdur Rab Yusufi becoming the next secretaries-general. Among the party's early activities were participating in the 1990 Mass Uprising in Bangladesh against President Hussain Muhammad Ershad.

On 22 December 1990, Azizul Haque founded the Islami Oikya Jote; a political alliance of six Islamic parties consisting of his Khelafat Majlis, the Islami Shashontantra Andolan party led by Syed Fazlul Karim, the Nizam-e-Islam Party, the Jamiat Ulema-e-Islam led by Abdul Karim Shaykh-e-Kouria, the Khilafat Andolan led by Ahmadullah Ashraf and the Faraizi Jamaat. The alliance participated in the 1991 Bangladeshi general election, gaining one constituency (Sylhet-5) under Obaidul Haque of the Khelafat Majlis.

As a result of the 1992 Demolition of the Babri Masjid in Ayodhya, India, the Majlis organised a march from Dhaka to Ayodhya on 2 January 1993 and demanded its restoration. The protestors, led by Azizul Haque, reached the border near Khulna, where the Government of Bangladesh blocked off the boundaries and suppressed the march. In the same year, Azizul Haque declared on behalf of the Majlis that India's prime minister Narasimha Rao should not visit India and gave orders to besiege the national airport. Haque was coincidentally arrested for this reason on 9 April 1993, though he was later released on 8 May.

In 2005, the party split into two as Azizul Haque did not agree with joining the BNP-led Four Party Alliance. On 22 May 2005, the Central Majlis-ash-Shura session was held at the Hotel Ruposhi Bangla in Paltan, where the Naib-e-Amir Muhammad Ishaq was elected as the party's amir, and Ahmad Abdul Qadir as the general-secretary.

In conjunction with other Islamist parties, Khilafat Majlis held street protests in the capital, Dhaka condemning Israel for its role in the 2006 Lebanon War. In February 2010, Police in Khulna baton-charged Khilafat Majlis activists who were holding street protests, and arrested five. Khilafat Majlis activists were reportedly protesting the arrest of a central party leader Maulana Shakhawat, who had been arrested by the government. In 2021, the Majlis officially quit the BNP Alliance.

== Aim ==
The Khelafat Majlis seeks the establishment of a state based on Islamic Principles.

== Election results ==
=== Jatiya Sangsad elections ===
Election	Party leader	Votes	%	Seats	+/–	Position	Outcome
2026	Abdul Basit Azad	5,69,730	0.76%	1 / 350	Boycotted	6th	Opposition

== See also ==
- List of Deobandi organisations
