= Ibrahim Ali Tashna =

Bengali Islamic scholar, poet and activist (1872–1931)

Shah Muhammad Ibrahim Ali Tashna

Personal life
- Born: 1872 Kanaighat, Sylhet District
- Died: 11 September 1931 (aged 58–59) Kanaighat, Sylhet District
- Children: Oliur Rahman
- Main interest(s): Hadith, poetry
- Notable work: Agnikuṇḍa
- Relatives: Ismail Alam (brother)

Religious life
- Religion: Islam
- Jurisprudence: Hanafi
- Creed: Sunni

Muslim leader
- Teacher: Hafiz Muhammad Ahmad
- Influenced by: Mahmud Hasan Deobandi Ashraf Ali Thanwi

Shāh Muḥammad Ibrāhīm ʿAlī (Bengali: শাহ মোহাম্মদ ইবরাহীম আলী; 1872 – 11 September 1931) was a Bengali Islamic scholar, poet and activist of the Khilafat Movement. He wrote poetry in the Bengali, Urdu and Persian languages under the pen name of Tashna (Persian: تشنه). His magnum opus Agnikuṇḍa is a compilation of his writings during his imprisonment.

== Early life and family ==
Shah Muhammad Ibrahim Ali was born in 1872, to a Bengali Muslim family in the village of Batiail in Kanaighat, Sylhet District. His father, Mawlana Shah Abdur Rahman Qadri, was a notable mufti by occupation. His elder brother was Ismail Alam. The family was descended from Shah Taqiuddin, a 14th-century Sufi missionary and companion of Shah Jalal.

== Education ==
Ali initially studied at home with his father before enrolling at the Ajiria Madrasa in Fulbari, Golapganj. After completing his education there, he studied at the Darul Uloom Deoband in North India. Ali spent nine years in Deoband, studying under the likes of Fazal Haq Deobandi, Muhammad Munir Nanautavi and Hafiz Muhammad Ahmad.

He was married to Asiya Khatun, and had several children including Oliur Rahman.

== Career ==
Returning to his country, Ali began his career in the sector of Islamic education. In addition to the Imdadul Uloom Umarganj in Kanaighat (est. 1899), Ali established multiple educational institutions such as Sarakerbazar Ahmadiyya Madrasa. At this time, the teaching of tajwid was not prevalent in the Jaintia plains, and so Ali began a tajwid initiative at his madrasa in Umarganj.

In 1902, Ali set off towards Delhi in North India for second time, along with his students. He completed Hadith studies for two years under Nazir Ahmad Deobandi. His teacher noticed his thirst for seeking ilm and thus gave him the epithet of Tashna, meaning thirsty in Persian. It is from this period that he became recognised as Ibrahim Ali Tashna.

Tashna played a significant role in popularising Islamic gatherings (jalsa) in the erstwhile Sylhet district. His first mass gathering event in northern Sylhet took place in 1906, and had tens of thousands of attendees. A popular folk saying emerged as result of the popularity of Tashna and his accomplice's religious gatherings:

ত্রিশ চল্লিশ হাজার লোক হয় এই মহফিলের মাঝে

trish chôllish hazar lok hoy ei môhfiler majhe
ইসলামের ডঙ্কা বাজে- হায় হায়
islamer dôngka baje - hay hay
রঙ্গে ঢঙ্গের ওয়াজ করে কত রঙ্গের উলামায়।

rônge dhônger waz kôre kôtô rônger ulamay.

== Imprisonment and activism ==
Under the instructions of Mahmud Hasan Deobandi, Tashna became actively involved with the Khilafat Movement which sought to restore the Ottoman Caliphate. Tashna used to give public speeches in Bengali and Urdu, and gained this skill through giving khutbahs (Friday sermons) at the Jama Masjid of Delhi. As a result of his association with this movement, the colonial authorities imprisoned Tashna.

On 23 March 1922, the Kanaighat Islamia Madrasa set to host their annual jalsa (presided by Tashna) but the British Raj had outlawed it and declared Section 144 throughout Kanaighat. Tashna and his committee were not fussed by the ban and subsequently violated Section 144 by continuing the jalsa. J. E. Webster, the Commissioner of Surma Valley, sent a police force to the jalsa at 12pm, who began shooting at the masses. The armed British were able to conduct a swift victory, by shooting down six people dead and injuring 38 others.

== Works ==
Tashna wrote several books in Urdu such as Tajvid, Sharh Kafiyyah and Sharh Usul ash-Shashi. He is described as a natural poet, and has written many poems and qasidas in Urdu and Persian, which gained him repute in North India. His writings were regularly published in various periodicals published from North India at that time, and Akbar Allahabadi was among his fans.

It was the period after his imprisonment in which he left the political field to live a more spiritual and secluded life. During this time, Tashna began to write a lot of mysyic poetry in his mother-tongue, Bengali. The Nurer Jhangkar magazine was published by his son from 1934. Agnikuṇḍa was a compilation of songs relating to the longing and love of the Islamic prophet Muhammad, and is regarded as Tashna's magnum opus.

== Death ==
Tashna died in his own home at Kanaighat at the age of 61, on 11 September 1931. He left behind four sons and one daughter.

== See also ==
- List of Deobandis
