= James Leo Ferguson =

Bangladeshi freedom fighter, politician and tea industrialist

- জেমস লিও ফার্গুসন
- Born: Kanaighat, Sylhet
- Other name: Nanka
- Education: Army Burn Hall College; Comilla Cadet College
- Occupations: Politician; Tea industrialist; Freedom fighter
- Years active: 1976–present
- Political party: Bangladesh Awami League

Chairman of Lakshmiprasad Union
- In office 1976–1993

Military service
- Allegiance: Bangladesh
- Branch/service: Mukti Bahini
- Battles/wars: Bangladesh Liberation War
- Website: lakshiprashadpurboup.sylhet.gov.bd

James Leo Ferguson (Bengali: জেমস লিও ফার্গুসন), commonly known by the nickname Nanka, is a Bangladeshi politician, tea industrialist, and freedom fighter. He is the owner of Lobhachhara Tea Estate. Ferguson was elected as a people's representative after the liberation of Bangladesh. From 1976 to 1993, for a stretch of 17 years, he was the chairman of Lakshmiprasad Union, Kanaighat, Sylhet.

== Background ==
Ferguson was born in Kanaighat, Sylhet. He is an Anglo-Indian. His forefathers were from Scotland. His great-grandfather Donald Ferguson had fought in World War I. His grandfather James Arthur Ferguson joined the British army too and took part in World War II. After the Second World War, Arthur Ferguson retired from the army and took up a job at the India Isabella Tea Estate. Leo Ferguson's mother June Ferguson became the manager of the Lobhachhara tea garden. She was the first female tea garden manager in the Indian subcontinent at that time. Later they bought the tea garden.

== Education ==
Ferguson studied at Comilla Cadet College and graduated in 1971. At the end of April that year, he ran away from Comilla and came to Sylhet.

== Participation in the Liberation War ==
Map showing Bangladesh Liberation War Sectors

After returning to Lobhachhara, Ferguson crossed over into India taking his mother's permission. He underwent military training and joined Bangladesh Liberation War. Perhaps the soldier's blood that ran in his veins prompted him to join the liberation war. According to him,

I was born in this land. I fought for this land. My mother inspired me. I fought from August under sub-sector 5. I was a Scotsman and my comrades loved me. They were inspired by the war experiences of my forefathers.

== Personal life ==
In 1982, Leo married a Scottish woman named Quinla. They have two sons. His wife and sons live in London, UK. As a people's representative, he lives in Kanaighat. But they travel back and forth. Ferguson celebrates Victory day of Bangladesh quietly at his tea garden.
