= Abul Hasan (politician) =

Bangladeshi Islamic scholar and politician

Mufti Abul Hasan
- মুফতি আবুল হাসান

Member of the Bangladesh Parliament for Sylhet-5
- Incumbent
- Assumed office 17 February 2026
- Preceded by: Husam Uddin Chowdhury

Personal details
- Born: Muhammad Abul Hasan
- Party: Khelafat Majlis
- Profession: Khatib, teacher

Mufti Abul Hasan is a Bangladeshi Islamic scholar and a politician of Khelafat Majlis. He was elected as a member of parliament in the 13th National Parliamentary Election.

== Career ==
In his professional life, he serves as the khatib of Zakiganj Central Jame Mosque and is also a teacher at Jamia Islamia Darus Sunnah Mohammadia Lamagram Madrasa in Zakiganj.

== Politics ==
He received 75,821 votes with the wall clock symbol as the candidate of Khelafat Majlis nominated by the 11-party alliance in the Sylhet-5 (Zakiganj–Kanaighat) constituency. His nearest rival, Ubaidullah Faruq, central president of Jamiat Ulema-e-Islam Bangladesh, received 69,644 votes with the date palm tree symbol. Abul Hasan won by a margin of 6,177 votes. In this constituency, Mamunur Rashid (Chaksu Mamun) secured third position with 56,369 votes.
