= Kanaighat Upazila =

Kanaighat কানাইঘাট
- Upazila
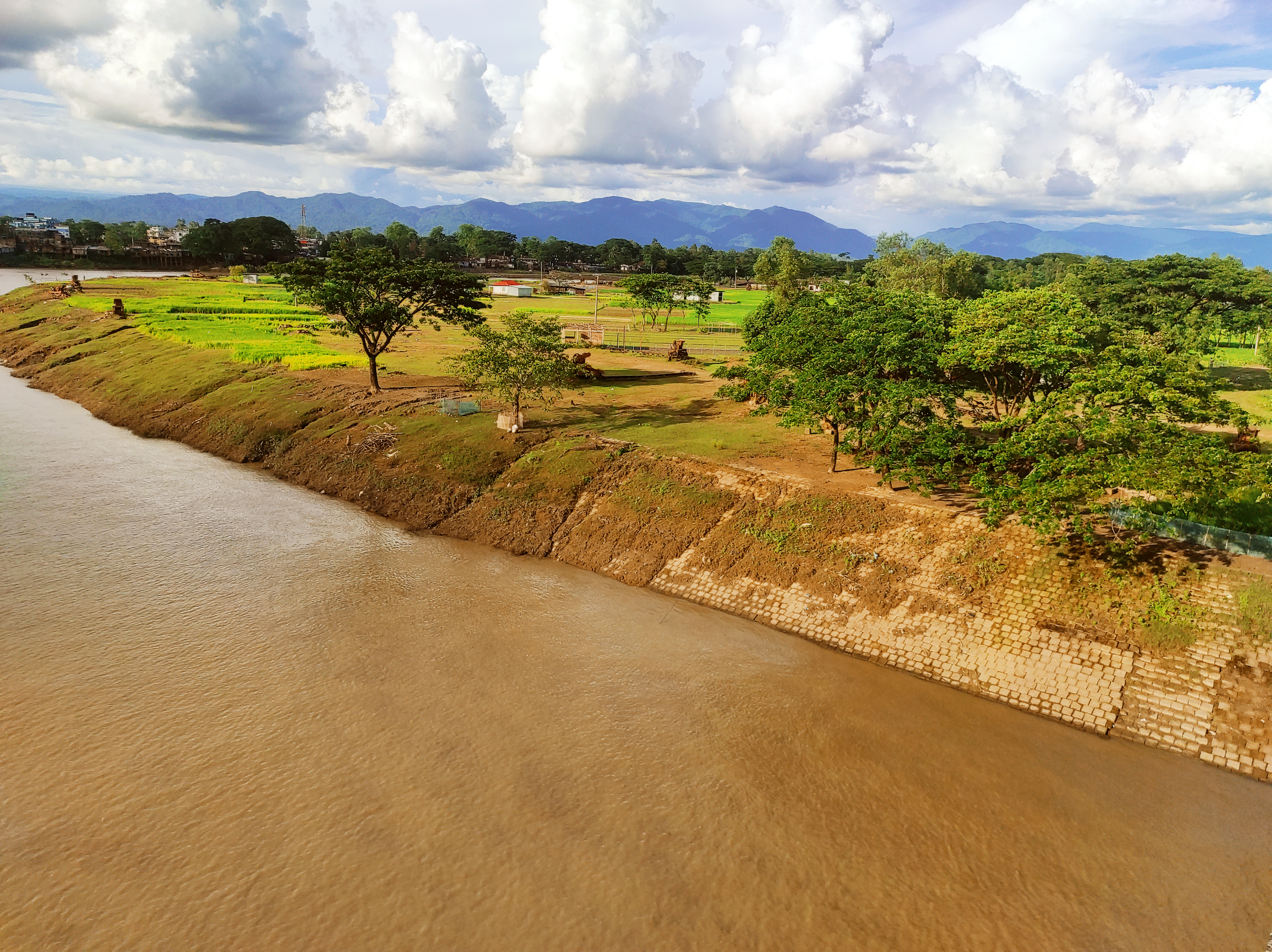
- Surma River in Kanaighat

- Coordinates: 25°1′N 92°14.8′E
- Country: Bangladesh
- Division: Sylhet
- District: Sylhet
- Thana: 1880-1932
- Upazila: 1983

Government
  - MP (Sylhet-5): Mufti Abul Hasan

Area
  - Total: 391.79 km^{2} (151.27 sq mi)

Population (2022)
  - Total: 317,578
  - Density: 810.58/km^{2} (2,099.4/sq mi)
- Demonym: Kanaighati
- Time zone: UTC+6 (BST)
- Postal code: 3180
- Area code: 08220
- Website: kanaighat.sylhet.gov.bd

Kanaighat Upazila mauza geocode map

Kanaighat (Bengali: কানাইঘাট) is an upazila of Sylhet Division of Bangladesh. It is the second-largest upazila (sub-district) of Sylhet District after Gowainghat Upazila. It is named after the town of Kanaighat, which is also the only municipality in the Upazila.

== Etymology ==
There are two theories regarding the naming of Kanaighat. The word ghat in the Bengali language refers to a flight of steps leading down to a river. The Kanaighat Bazar, which the Kanaighat Upazila is named after, sits on the banks of the Surma River. The most popular theory is that there was a boatman (majhi) by the name of Kanai who lived here. Others suggest that it was named after Kanai Chowdhury of Mulagul, who was a powerful courtier in the Jaintia royal court.

== History ==
Kanaighat was formerly under the rule of the Jaintia Kingdom. The British conquered the Jaintia Kingdom on 16 March 1835, finally incorporating its lowland areas into the Sylhet District after 90 years. As a result, the Muslims of Sylhet found the opportunity to start settling in sparsely populated Kanaighat. In order to maintain peace and discipline, the British colonials established a thana (police stationa and administrative headquarters) atop the Jhorna Tila in Lakshipur Mauza of Mulagul Pargana in 1841. The headquarters was moved to Kanaighat Bazar/Sadar in 1880. Establishments of middle schools, madrasas and mosques from 1905 marked the start of an intellectual awakening in Kanaighat, which had a reputation of ignorance due to its long time in the Jaintia Kingdom.

On 23 March 1922, the Kanaighat Islamia Madrasa set to host their annual jalsa (presided by Ibrahim Ali Tashna) but the British Raj had outlawed it and declared Section 144 throughout Kanaighat. Tashna and his committee were not fussed by the ban and subsequently violated Section 144 by continuing the jalsa. J. E. Webster, the Commissioner of Surma Valley, sent a police force to the jalsa at 12pm, who began shooting at the masses. The armed British were able to conduct a swift victory, by shooting down six people dead and injuring 38 others. The six Kanaighatis killed were: Maulvi Abd as-Salam, Muhammad Musa Mia, Abdul Majid, Haji Azizur Rahman and Yasin Mia. The British established a thana (police station and administrative headquarters) in Kanaighat in 1932.

The Kanaighat Community Club was founded in 1961. During the Bangladesh Liberation War of 1971, the Pakistani Army teamed up with Razakars to do a mass killing in Maligram and Gouripur. A memorial was built in Momtazganj. On 4 September 1971, freedom fighter Khwaja Nizamuddin Bhuyan of Comilla fought against the Pakistan Army in Kanaighat for 10 hours. Martyred in Atgram Road, he was laid to rest at Mokimtila. Liaquat Ali Khan (Bir Uttom) of Bagerhat fought and was martyred in Kanaighat's Gouripur in November 1971. Kanaighat was liberated on 4 December 1971 following Pakistani surrender.

On 24 March 1983, the President of Bangladesh, H M Ershad, upgraded Kanaighat's thana status to an upazila as a part of his decentralisation programme. This improved the socio-economic conditions of Kanaighat. The Islamic Library and Public Welfare Association was founded in Mukiganj Bazar (Jhingabari UP) in 1988.The largest Social Organisation কানাইঘাট উপজেলা সমাজ কল্যাণ পরিষদ Established at 2012 by Ahmed Masum

== Geography ==
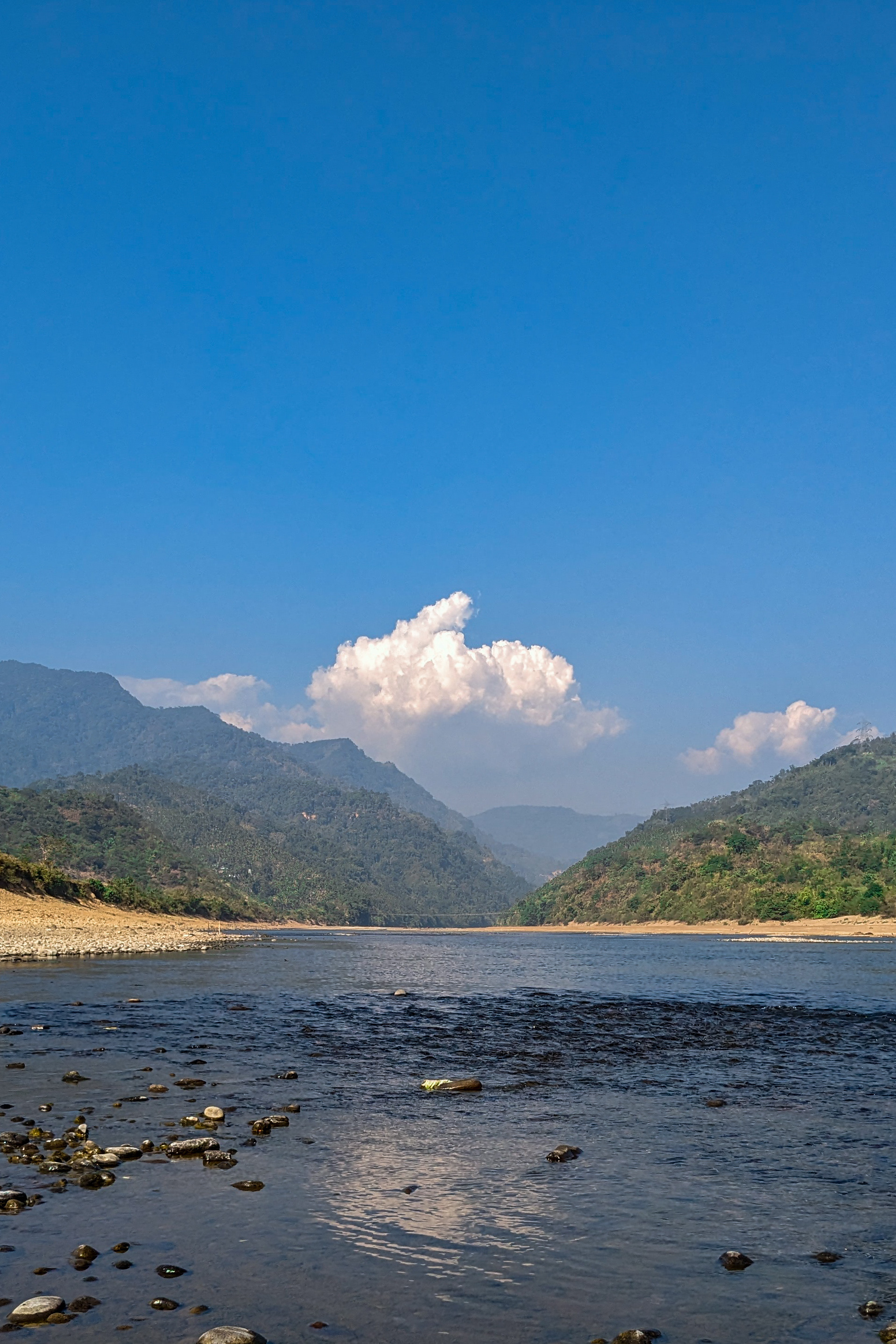
Lovachara

Kanaighat is located at 25.0166°N 92.2472°E and has a total area of 391.79 km^{2}. The Surma River flows through the upazila, and the Lobha River, Dhona River, Deochhai River and Chatal beel are other notable bodies of water in the area. It is bounded by the Indian state of Meghalaya and the Jaintiapur Upazila to its north, Zakiganj and Beanibazar to its south, Meghalaya to its east and Jaintapur and Golapganj to its west.

== Demographics ==
Religions in Kanaighat Upazila (2022)
Religion	Percent
Islam	96.73%
Hinduism	3.20%
Other or not stated	0.07%

According to the 2022 Bangladeshi census, Kanaighat Upazila had 61,680 households and a population of 317,578. 11.67% of the population were under 5 years of age. Kanaighat had a literacy rate (age 7 and over) of 71.56%: 73.20% for males and 70.16% for females, and a sex ratio of 88.15 males for every 100 females. 51,259 (16.14%) lived in urban areas.

According to the 2011 Census of Bangladesh, Kanaighat Upazila had 46,147 households and a population of 263,969. 80,088 (30.34%) were under 10 years of age. Kanaighat had a literacy rate (age 7 and over) of 43.54%, compared to the national average of 51.8%, and a sex ratio of 1041 females per 1000 males. 27,078 (10.26%) lived in urban areas.

At the 2001 Bangladesh census, Kanaighat had a population of about 2,50,000. It has 29568 households. Males constituted 50.49% of the population, and females 49.51%. The population of those aged 18 and older was 85,855.

95% of Kanaighat inhabitants adhere to Islam with Hindu minorities forming 4.10% of the total population. 0.2% of Kanaighatis follow Christianity and Buddhism, and 0.3% follow tribal religions. Almost all inhabitants are ethnic Bengalis, with small minorities of Meitei, Khasi and an Anglo-Indian by the name of James Leo Ferguson.

== Administration ==
Kanaighat Upazila is divided into the Kanaighat Municipality and nine union parishads: Bara Chatul, Dakshin Banigarm, Jhingrabari, Kanaighat, Paschim Lakshmi Prasad, Satbak (Paschim Dighirpar), Purba Lakshmi Prasad, Purba Dighirpar, and Rajaganj. The union parishads are subdivided into 198 mauzas and 264 villages.

Kanaighat Municipality is subdivided into 9 wards and 26 mahallas.

Upazila Chairmen
Name	Term
Alhaj M A Rakib	1985-1990
Ashiq Uddin Chowdhury	1990-1991, 2008–2014, 2014–2019
Alhaj Abdul Mumin Chowdhury	2019-2024

== Education ==
Educational institutions in Kanaighat
Name	Established
Kanaighat Govt.High School	1905
Birdol Noy Mouja (N.M) Academy	1995
Jhingabari Senior Fazil Madrasa	1882
Kanaighat Mansuria Senior Madrasa	1889
Umarganj Imdadul Uloom Madrasa	1898
Gachbari Jamiul Uloom Alia Madrasa	1901
Saraker Bazar Ahmadia Alia Madrasa	1914
Rahimia Alia Madrasa	1940
Kanaighat Government College	1990

== Economy and tourism ==
Kanaighat contains many popular tourist sites. In addition to its tea gardens, it also has the Lobhachhara Patharkoari stone reserves and the Tamabil land port. Out of its 491 mosques, the Kanaighat Jami Mosque is quite notable.

== Notable people ==
- Farid Uddin Chowdhury, teacher, businessman and politician
- Habibur Rahman (Tota Mia), member of parliament of the first Jatiya Sangsad
- James Leo Ferguson, tea planter, was born in Kanaighat.
- Ibrahim Chatuli, scholar, politician and social reformer
- Moulvi Abdus Salam (1928–1991), politician and minister at Pakistan era
- Ismail Alam (1868–1937), Urdu poet and activist
- Oliur Rahman (1916–2006), principal of Umarganj Madrasa
- Ibrahim Ali Tashna, Islamic scholar, multilingual poet and activist
- Mushahid Ahmad Bayampuri (1907–1970), founding principal, Kanaighat Darul Ulum Madrasha
