= Oliur Rahman =

Shah Oliur Rahman
- ওলিউর রহমান

Personal life
- Born: 1916 Batiail, Kanaighat, Sylhet District
- Died: 20 January 2006 (aged 89–90) Kanaighat, Sylhet District, Bangladesh
- Parent: Ibrahim Ali Tashna (father)
- Relatives: Ismail Alam (uncle)

Religious life
- Religion: Islam
- Denomination: Sunni
- Jurisprudence: Hanafi
- Tariqa: Chishti
- Movement: Deobandi

Muslim leader
- Teacher: Ahmed Ali Lahori
- Influenced by: Ashraf Ali Thanwi Athar Ali Muhammadullah Hafezzi

Shah Oliur Rahman (Bengali: শাহ ওলিউর রহমান, Persian: شاه ولی الرحمن; 1916 — 20 January 2006) was a Bangladeshi Islamic scholar, writer, politician and female education activist.

== Early life and education ==
Oliur Rahman was born in 1916 to a Bengali Muslim family in the village of Batiail in Kanaighat, Sylhet District. He was the son of Ibrahim Ali Tashna, an Islamic scholar, and Asiya Khatun. His paternal grandfather, Mawlana Mufti Shah Abdur Rahman Qadri was descended from Shah Taqiuddin, a 14th-century Sufi missionary and companion of Shah Jalal.

His education began at the Umarganj Primary School, and then at Imdadul Uloom Umarganj madrasa established by his father. In 1937, he completed his fazil certification from Gachhbari Jamiul Uloom Kamil Madrasa. The following year, he migrated to the Rampur State where he enrolled at the Rampur Alia Madrasa, completing Hadith studies under Mawlana Abdul Khalil and Quranic exegesis under Ahmed Ali Lahori.

== Career ==
From 1956, Oliur Rahman dedicated his life to teaching and spent the rest of his life as the principal of Imdadul Uloom Umarganj madrasa. He played an important role in strengthening the foundation of Maktab education. In 1968, he founded and directed a Nadiyatul Quran Board training camp; the first of its kind in Sylhet District. He also organised a weekly women's ijtema (Islamic conference) in the same year. He established Madrasatul Banat, one of the first women's madrasa in Sylhet, in 1981. It provided education to women regarding tajwid, further Islamic studies, Bengali literature, mathematics, dictation, morals and handicraft. In 1972, he started the first women's jalsa (Islamic gathering) in Bangladesh. Oliur Rahman wrote several books relating to female education including Islahun Neswan, Taharatun Neswan, Talimun Neswan, Haq Prachar, Islah, Hedayater Dawatnamaand Muslim Mahila Shikkha.

=== Political career ===
Prior to the independence of Pakistan, Oliur Rahman was associated with the All-India Muslim League. After independence, he joined the Nizam-e-Islam Party at the call of his murshid Athar Ali. He also founded two organisations of his own in 1979; Anjuman-e-Islah al-Muslimeen and Ittehad-ul-Ulama.

== Personal life ==
Oliur Rahman first gave bay'ah to Nisar Ali, but after his death, he pledged allegiance to Athar Ali, a student and khalifa (spiritual successor) of Ashraf Ali Thanwi until the latter's death in 1976. He then pledged allegiance to Muhammadullah Hafezzi.

== Death ==
Oliur Rahman died on Friday 20 January 2006 at 10:30pm.

== See also ==
- List of Deobandis
