= Ajmal Ali Choudhury =

Pakistani politician (c.1914–1955)

Ajmal Ali Chowdhury
- আজমল আলী চৌধুরী

Member of the National Assembly of Pakistan
- In office 1965–1969
- President: Ayub Khan, Yahya Khan
- Preceded by: Moulana Mohammad Mushahid
- Constituency: Sylhet-II

Personal details
- Born: 1914 Sylhet, Assam, British India
- Died: December 18, 1971 (aged 54–55) Sylhet, Chittagong, Bangladesh
- Spouse: Bachelor
- Relations: Mahbub Ali Khan (cousin)
- Children: none
- Parent: Amjad Ali Choudhury (father)
- Education: Murari Chand College

Ajmal Ali Choudhury (Bengali: আজমল আলী চৌধুরী, Urdu: اجمل علی چودھری) was a Pakistani politician who served as a Minister of Commerce of Pakistan. He was also a member of the 4th National Assembly of Pakistan. His close relationship with Muhammad Ali Jinnah and contributions during the 1947 Sylhet referendum led to him being known as the Sylhet's Quaid by his supporters. (Note: He was also known by the nickname Sher-e-Sylhet (Lion of Sylhet), a title which has been attributed to others too such as Mahmud Ali.) However, he became heavily criticised after supporting Pakistan during the Bangladesh Liberation War.

== Early life and family ==
Ajmal Ali Choudhury was born into a Bengali Muslim family on Amjad Ali Road in Sylhet of the British Raj's Assam Province. He was noted for his dress sense which consisted of a sherwani with tight-fitting pyjamas and a Jinnah cap.

His father, Khan Bahadur Amjad Ali Choudhury, was a civil advocate who worked in Sylhet as a public prosecutor, and died at court in the 1930s. His mother, Habibunnesa Khanom, was the eldest daughter of Khan Bahadur Dr. Asaddar Ali Khan (1850-1937), Sylhet's first Muslim civil surgeon and the son-in-law of Syed Ameer Ali. A graduate of the Aliah University, Asaddar Ali Khan was also the personal physician to the Bihari Shia lawyer-politician Syed Hasan Imam, the top barrister of Calcutta High Court and leader of the Indian National Congress. Habibunnesa's grandfather, Abid Khan, was the descendant of an Afghan migrant to Bengal. Choudhury's brother, Warith Ali Choudhury, was a member of the Assam Civil Service and a central secretary in the Government of Pakistan. His sister, Khairunnesa Khanom, was a school inspector in eastern Bengal and later the headmistress of Karachi Bengali School. She was married to Ali Ashraf bin Muhammad Nadir of Ambarkhana, a second uncle of Abul Maal Abdul Muhith.

== Education ==
Choudhury was educated in Murari Chand College before proceeding to study at Varanasi in North India. He played a role in the Bengali drama scene of Sylhet.

== Career ==
In 1937, Choudhury joined the All-India Muslim League as a member of its council. He was also a part of the Assam Provincial Muslim League Working Committee and Council. On 3 August 1941, he sent a letter to Muhammad Ali Jinnah informing him of a meeting in Sarada Memorial Hall presided by Moulvi Abdur Rahman in which the Muslims of Sylhet expressed full faith in Jinnah's leadership. In 1944, Choudhury was elected as the Municipal Commissioner and in a letter to Nawab Mohammad Ismail Khan, he mentioned how he was elected as the President of the All-Assam Muslim Students Federation in January. The erstwhile Congress-led Government of Assam arrested him in 1946 for the Muslim League protests opposing the eviction of Muslims in Upper Assam.

During Jinnah's visit to Sylhet, he stayed at Chowdhury's house. After the Independence of Pakistan, Choudhury joined the Working Committee of the East Bengal Muslim League, the Muslim League Mass Contact Committee and the Pakistan Muslim League Council.

Choudhury was a Member of the 4th National Assembly of Pakistan representing Sylhet-II constituency as an independent candidate. A dinner was held in his honour at the residence of Begum Dolly Azad. He also served as the Minister of Industries and Natural Resources, based in Rawalpindi, on 6 July 1968.

== Death ==
Choudhury did not partake in the Bangladesh Liberation War but was a member of the Shanti Committee and favoured Urdu as the national language of Pakistan. In Parliament, he had expressed that language was not the issue, but it was rather the fact that the variant of Bengali was too "Sanskritized". He attended an anti-independence meeting hosted by Dr Abdul Majid at the Sylhet Register Maidan, which was also attended by the likes of Abdul Latif Chowdhury Fultali. He opposed the breakup of Pakistan, mentioning on 22 August 1971 that Sylhet joined Pakistan through a referendum and that it is a sacred duty to maintain the integrity of Pakistan and thwart "Indian conspiracy". On 18 December 1971, after the Independence of Bangladesh, Choudhury was targeted by freedom fighters whilst at the Shah Jalal Dargah near his home in Sylhet town. He was taken to the streets by the Mukti Bahini where he was publicly assassinated and his body was mutilated. The body was left on display outside the Sylhet Government College for three days before his family retrieved it and gave him a burial. The erstwhile Additional Deputy Commissioner of Sylhet, AMM Shawkat Ali, mentioned that Sylhet's administrator Dewan Farid Gazi stated that the newly founded Government of Bangladesh had not authorised for anyone's killing and to take precautionary measures.
