= Ismail Alam =

Urdu poet

Mawlana Abul Aziz Muhammad Ismail Ali
- Title: Alam

Personal life
- Born: 1868
- Died: 1937 (aged approximately 69) Kanaighat, Sylhet District
- Main interest(s): Hadith, poetry
- Notable work(s): Waz Nasihat, Poetry
- Relatives: Ibrahim Ali Tashna (brother); Oliur Rahman (nephew)

Religious life
- Religion: Islam
- Jurisprudence: Hanafi
- Creed: Sunni

Muslim leader
- Influenced by: Ghalib
- Influenced: Anjab Ali Shawq, Salahuddin Yusuf
- Arabic name
- Personal (Ism): Muḥammad Ismāʿīl ʿAlī محمد إسماعيل علي
- Patronymic (Nasab): ibn ʿAbd ar-Raḥmān بن عبد الرحمن
- Teknonymic (Kunya): Abū al-ʿAzīz أبو العزيز
- Epithet (Laqab): Ālam آلم

Abū al-ʿAzīz Muḥammad Ismāʿīl ʿAlī (Bengali: আবুল আজীজ মোহাম্মদ ইসমাঈল আলী; 1868–1937) was a Bengali politician, teacher and activist of the Khilafat Movement. He wrote poetry in Urdu under the pen name of Ālam (Urdu: آلم). His Diwan-i-Alam poem led to the Calcutta Alia Madrasa awarding him the title of Parrot of Bengal in 1910.

== Early life and family ==
Abul Aziz Muhammad Ismail Ali was born in 1868, to a Bengali Muslim family in the village of Batiail in Kanaighat, Sylhet District. His father, Mawlana Shah Abdur Rahman Qadri, was a notable mufti by occupation. His younger brother was the scholar Ibrahim Ali Tashna. The family was descended from Shah Taqiuddin, a 14th-century Sufi missionary and companion of Shah Jalal.

== Education ==
Ismail initially studied at home with his father before studying at the Ajiria Madrasa in Fulbari, Golapganj. After getting good results in Arabic and Persian, he enrolled at the Calcutta Alia Madrasa and graduated in 1897. He was also a murid of Fazlur Rahman Ganj-e-Muradabadi.

== Career ==
Along with his Bengali mother-tongue, Ismail Alam became a confident speaker of Arabic, Persian, and Urdu. This enabled him to play an important role in the subcontinent-wide Khilafat Movement, in addition to writing poetry. He used to judicial work. He also taught Hadith studies at the Madinatul Uloom, Gauripur in Assam, Jhingabari Senior Fazil Madrasa, and Sylhet Government Alia Madrasa.

== Works ==
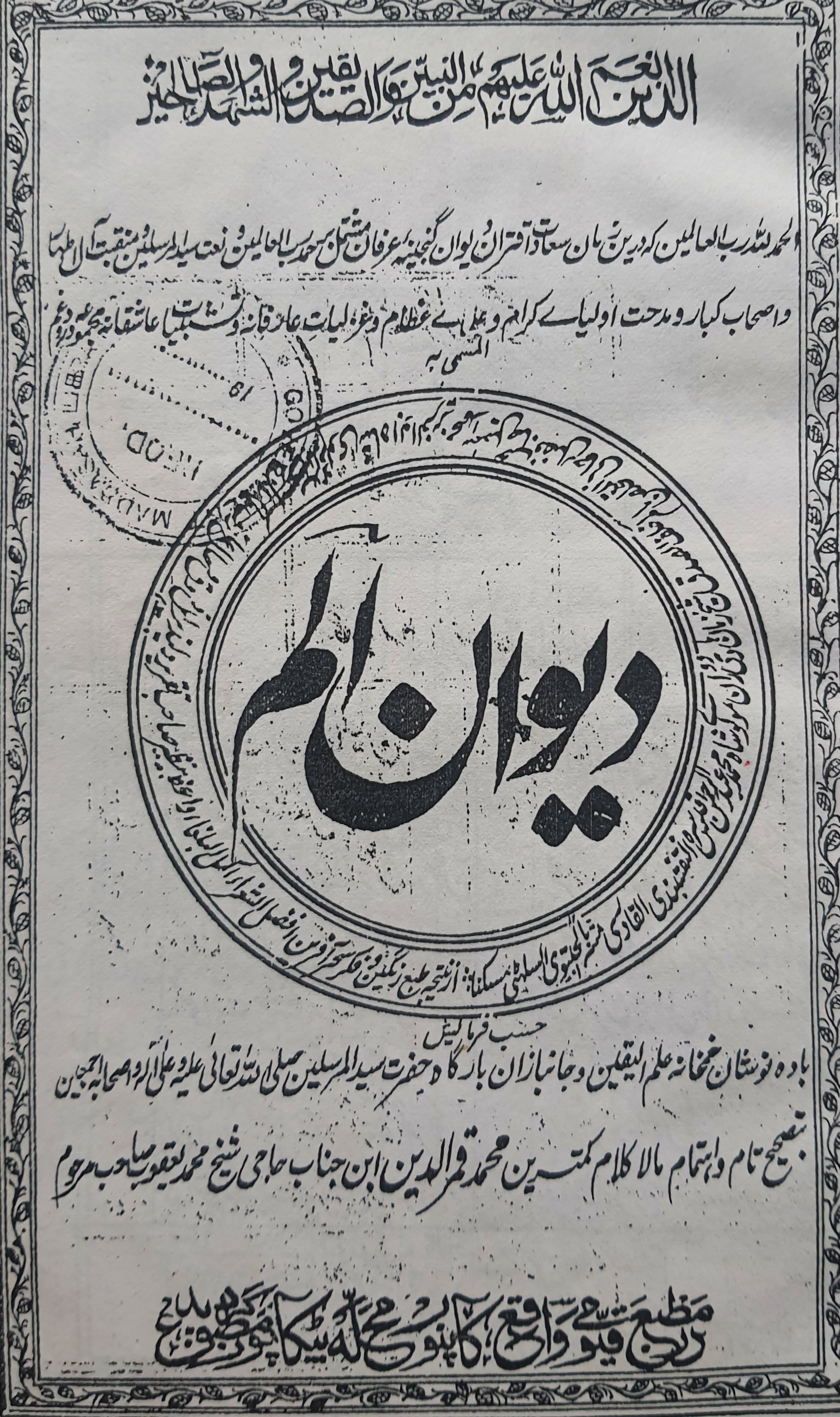
The cover of Diwan-i-Alam, Ismail Alam's magnum opus

Ismail Alam mainly wrote poetry in the Persian and Urdu languages, which was common among the upper-class Muslims of South Asia. His magnum opus, titled Diwan-i-Alam was noticed by William Hamilton Harley, the erstwhile principal of Calcutta Alia Madrasa. Harley awarded Alam the title of Banglar Tota, or the Parrot of Bengal. Alam composed the diwan in 1910 from Kanpur in North India when he was in Qayyumi, Waqiee Mahalla, Tikapur. It contained a sirah and various naʽats dedicated to the Islamic prophet Muhammad. Anjab Ali Shawq, another Urdu poet of Bengal, referred to Alam as his teacher of poetry.

== Death ==
Alam was blind in the last thirteen years of his life. He died in 1937. He was buried in the Sarakerbazar Eidgah graveyard, located 20 miles away from his village in Kanaighat.
