= Obaidul Haque =

Bangladeshi politician

Obaidul Haque Wazirpuri
- ওবায়দুল হক উজ়িরপুরী

Member of the Bangladesh Parliament for Sylhet-5
- In office 27 February 1991 – 1996
- Preceded by: Mahmudur Rahman Majumdar
- Succeeded by: Abdul Kahir Chowdhury

Personal details
- Born: 2 January 1934 Wazirpur, Kholachhora, Zakiganj, Sylhet District, British Raj
- Died: 17 January 2008 (aged 74) Sylhet District, Bangladesh
- Party: Bangladesh Khelafat Majlis
- Other political affiliations: Islami Oikya Jote

Obaidul Haque (Bengali: ওবায়দুল হক; 1934–2008) was a politician, teacher and a member of parliament for Sylhet-5.

== Early life and education ==
Obaid was born on 2 January 1934 into a Bengali Muslim in the village of Wazirpur in Kholachhora Union, Zakiganj, Sylhet District, Bangladesh. He completed his primary education locally, before enrolling as a student at the Dubag Junior High School up until class 8. He then studied at the Ranaping Arabia Hussainia Madrasa in Dhakauttar, Golapganj. After that, he studied at the Ashraful Uloom Madrasa in Bara Katara, Dhaka. In addition to Bengali, Obaid was fluent in Urdu and Arabic.

== Career ==
Obaid began his career as a teacher at the Lalarchak Madrasa in Rajaganj Union, Kanaighat under the instruction of his teacher Riyasat Ali. In 1960, he became a teacher at the Ranaping Arabia Hussainia Madrasa which he continued to do as a teacher of Hadith there until his death. He served as the former co-president of the Befaqul Madarisil Arabia Bangladesh and president of the Azad Deeni Edaraye Talim Bangladesh.

Obaid was elected to parliament from Sylhet-5 as a Islami Oikya Jote candidate in 1991.

== Death ==
Obaid died on 17 January 2008. He was buried near the Wazirpur Jame Mosque in Sheola-Zakiganj Road. His son was Shamsul Haque.
