= Ibrahim Chatuli =

Bangladeshi scholar, politician and social reformer

Moulvi Ibrahim Ali Chatuli Chatuli
- ইব্রাহীম আলী চতুলী

Education Minister of Assam Legislative Council
- In office 1938–1941

Member of the Assam and later the East Bengal Legislative Assembly
- In office 1946–1954
- Preceded by: Moulvi Abdus Salam
- Succeeded by: Mokbul Hossain
- Constituency: Sylhet Sadar-N

Personal life
- Born: 1894 Haratail, Barachatul Union, Kanaighat, Sylhet District, British Raj
- Died: 1984 (aged 89–90) Sylhet, Bangladesh
- Parent: Munshi Abdul Karim (father)
- Political party: Jamiat Ulema-e-Hind

Religious life
- Religion: Islam
- Denomination: Sunni
- Jurisprudence: Hanafi
- Movement: Deobandi

Muslim leader
- Disciple of: Hussain Ahmad Madani

Ibrahim Ali Chatuli ( Arabic: إبراهيم على (جتولي); Bengali: ইব্রাহীম আলী চতুলী; 1894–1984) was a Bangladeshi Islamic scholar, politician and social reformer. He was the Education Minister of Assam Legislative Council, and an elected Member of the Assam Legislative Assembly belonging to the Jamiat Ulema-e-Hind political party. His constituency joined the East Bengal Legislative Assembly after the Partition of India in 1947.

== Early life ==
Ibrahim Ali Chatuli was born in 1894, to a Bengali Muslim family in the village of Haratail in Barachatul Union, Kanaighat, Sylhet District. His father Munshi Abdul Karim was a scholar and poet. He studied at Jhingabari Alia Madrasa in Kanaighat, Ajiria Madrasa in Golapganj and Rampur Madrasa in India. He was a disciple of Hussain Ahmad Madani.

== Career ==
Ibrahim Chatuli was for a long time the Imam (prayer leader) and Khatib of Sylhet Nayasarak Jame Mosque. In 1938 he was elected a Member of the British Parliament from Jamiat Ulema-e-Hind. After that he was the Education Minister of Assam Provincial Council. During the 1946 Indian provincial elections, he was elected as a Member of the Assam Legislative Assembly (MLA) from Jamiat Ulema-e-Hind in the Sylhet Sadar-N constituency. After the Sylhet referendum which incorporated the district into Pakistan, he became a member of the East Bengal Legislative Assembly.

He was the general secretary of the then Ulema-e-Hind in the province of Assam, and a leader of the Indian independence movement.

== Death ==
Chatuli died in 1984.

== See also ==
- List of Deobandis
