= Farid Uddin Chowdhury =

Bangladeshi politician

Personal life
- Born: 25 December 1947 (age 78) Kanaighat, Sylhet District, East Bengal, Dominion of Pakistan
- Died: 13 June 2026 Sylhet
- Education: Sylhet Alia Madrasa; Murari Chand College

Religious life
- Religion: Islam
- Denomination: Sunni
- Jurisprudence: Hanafi
- Movement: Jamaat-e-Islami

Member of the Bangladesh Parliament for Sylhet-5
- In office 2001–2008
- Preceded by: Hafiz Ahmed Mazumder
- Succeeded by: Hafiz Ahmed Mazumder

Personal details
- Party: Bangladesh Jamaat-e-Islami

Farid Uddin Chowdhury (Bengali: ফরিদ উদ্দিন চৌধুরী; born 25 December 1947) is a teacher, politician and businessman. He was the former Member of Parliament for the Sylhet-5 constituency from 2001 to 2008, representing Bangladesh Jamaat-e-Islami.

== Early life and education ==
Chowdhury was born on 25 December 1947 into a Bengali Muslim family in Talbari village, Kanaighat, Sylhet District in East Bengal. His father, Abdul Haq Chowdhury, was a Mawlana. Chowdhury completed his secondary education (dakhil) at the Sylhet Government Alia Madrasah in 1959. He remained in the madrasa where he finished his alim course in 1963, fazil in 1965 and Kamil degree by 1967. He then moved on to study at the Murari Chand College, where he earned his Bachelor of Arts in Bengali language in 1971.

== Career ==
Chowdhury began his career as an imam at the Gohorpur Mosque in Balaganj. He later became the principal of the Shahjalal Jamia School in Mirabazar, Sylhet. He is also a noted businessman in Sylhet, serving as the vice chairman of Al Hamra International Shopping Centre and the chairman of An-Noor Properties Limited.

=== Politics ===
During his time at the Murari Chand College, Chowdhury became the president of the Islami Chatra Sangha, the student-wing of the Bangladesh Jamaat-e-Islami party, and was also a member of its Central Executive Council.

Chowdhury stood up as a candidate of the Bangladesh Jamaat-e-Islami for the elections of 1986, 1991 and 1996 but was unsuccessful. During the 2001 Bangladeshi general election, he was elected to parliament for the Sylhet-5 constituency.

Transferring to the Jatiya Party, Chowdhury lost his seat in the 2008 Bangladeshi general elections.

== Controversy ==
In 2008, Chowdhury was investigated by the International Crimes Tribunal and was accused of being a commander of the Al-Badr paramilitary force. In 2010, he ranked 24th on the list of 40 top war criminals during the Bangladesh Liberation War in 1971. A list was given to the Immigration Police by the Ministry of Home Affairs which also mentioned Chowdhury's name. The Government of Bangladesh also sent lists to various embassies with Chowdhury's name among 40 war criminals.
