= Habibur Rahman (Awami League politician) =

Bangladeshi politician

Advocate Habibur Rahman (Tota Mia)
- হাবিবুর রহমান

Member of the Jatiya Sangsad
- In office 1973–1976
- Succeeded by: Nazim Kamran Choudhury
- Constituency: Sylhet-9

Personal details
- Born: 1919 Ratanpur, Sylhet District, British Raj
- Died: 1978 (aged 58–59) Sylhet District, Bangladesh
- Party: Muslim League (until 1954); Awami League
- Education: Murari Chand College; Dhaka Law College

Habibur Rahman (Bengali: হাবিবুর রহমান; 1919–1978), also known by his daak naam Tota Mia (Bengali: তোতা মিঞা), was a Bangladeshi politician and lawyer. He was a part of the Awami League and was a member of parliament for the Sylhet-9 constituency.

== Early life and education ==
Habibur Rahman was born in 1919, to a Bengali Muslim family in the village of Ratanpur in Chatul Pargana, Kanaighat, North Sylhet, British Raj. His father, Nazir Hatim Ali, was a member of the North Sylhet Board.

His primary education began in his village and in 1932, he enrolled at the Kanaighat MA School. He passed his matriculation with scholarship from Jaintia High School in 1939. After joining Murari Chand College, he passed his Intermediate of Arts in 1941 and his Bachelor of Arts in 1943. In 1945, he obtained his Bachelor of Laws and came first in the exams at Dhaka Law College.

== Career ==
In 1941, Habibur Rahman became a founding member of the Assam Provincial Muslim Students Federation. He was an active member of the Federation until 1945. He started a law business at the Sylhet District Bar in 1946. He was the first lawyer and member of the Sylhet Bar in the Jaintia constituency.

At the 1946 Indian provincial elections, he stood up as an All-India Muslim League candidate for the Jaintia constituency. He lost to Moulvi Ibrahim Ali Chatuli of the Jamiat Ulema-e-Hind. In 1954, Habibur Rahman joined the Awami League and became the president of the party's Sylhet District Committee until his death. He competed in the by-elections of 1956 but was unsuccessful once more. Sheikh Mujibur Rahman appeared at Darbasta Bazar in Jaintiapur to make public connections for him in the service.

Habibur Rahman successfully won a seat in the 1970 Pakistani general elections but did not become a member of the National Assembly of Pakistan due to the outbreak of the Bangladesh Liberation War. The Pakistan Army burnt down his residence in Sylhet town on 26 March 1971. He subsequently left for Shillong in India where he assisted in organising the liberation of northern Sylhet. Following the Surrender of Pakistan, he was elected as the administrator of Sylhet Sadar and played a role in re-establishing law and order in Sylhet. He was finally elected to parliament from Sylhet-9 as an Awami League candidate following the 1973 Bangladeshi general elections.

== Death ==
Habibur Rahman died in 1978 at the age of 59.
