= Cumilla Cadet College =

Military high school in Bangladesh

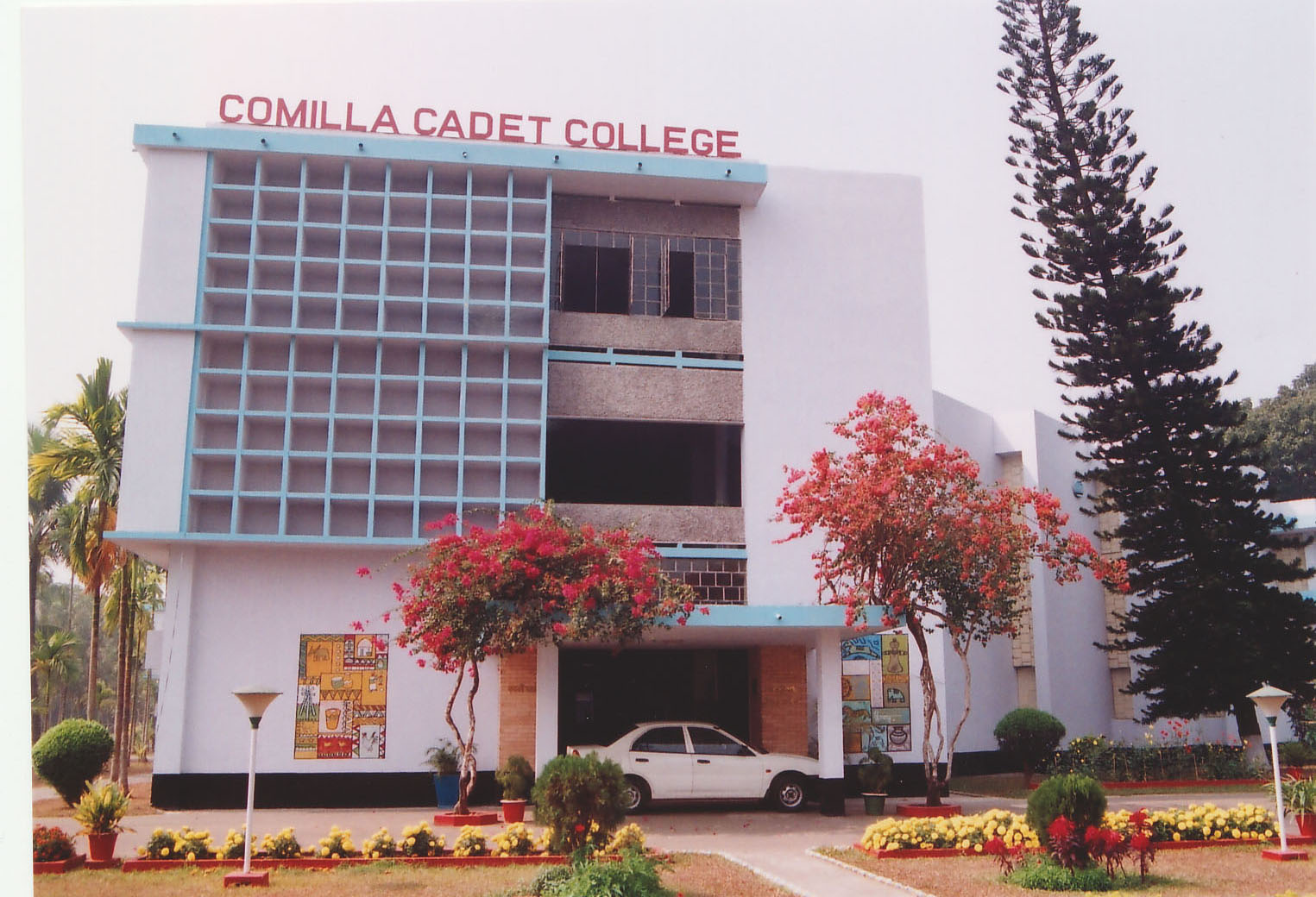
- Academic block

Location
- Kotbari, Comilla; Bangladesh; 23.4289°N 91.1345°E

Information
- Former name: Comilla Residential Model School
- Type: Military high school
- Motto: বাংলা: জ্ঞানই আলো (Knowledge Is Light)
- Established: 1 July 1983
- School board: Board of Intermediate and Secondary Education, Comilla
- Gender: Male
- Language: English
- Campus size: 52 acres (210,000 m^{2})
- EIIN: 133844
- Website: ccc.army.mil.bd

Cumilla Cadet College (Bengali: কুমিল্লা ক্যাডেট কলেজ; CCC) is a residential military high school and college in Comilla, Bangladesh, for boys in grades 7 to 12.

== History ==
Cumilla Cadet College (CCC) was created on 1 July 1983 by converting Comilla Residential Model School, a government boarding school that had been established on the site in 1966. CCC formally opened on 7 April 1984 under founding principal Lt. Col. Nurul Anwar, with 150 cadets in three intakes. In the months that followed, three more intakes brought it to full enrollment.

== Campus ==
The campus is located in Kotbari, Comilla, about 8 kilometres (5.0 mi) southwest of the city center and near the Buddhist archaeological site Shalban Vihara, Bangladesh Academy for Rural Development (BARD), and Comilla University.

The college campus covers an area of 50.74 acres.

== Curriculum ==
Cadet colleges are under the control of the Army. CCC also maintains a separate school and college for girls. Admission starts from seventh grade. At the end of tenth grade, cadets sit the Secondary School Certificate (SSC) examination. Those who pass have the option of continuing into eleventh and twelfth grades.

Students take their SSC and Higher Secondary Certificate (HSC) examinations under the Board of Intermediate and Secondary Education, Comilla. Of the schools under this board, CCC placed among the top ten in terms of SSC and/or HSC results from the early 1990s till date.

== Notable alumni ==
- James Leo Ferguson, freedom fighter and tea industrialist
- Md Jubayer Salehin, ambassador and retired Bangladesh Army officer
- S. M. Moniruzzaman, chairman of the Chittagong Port Authority, completed his HSC in 1987.
- AKM Shamsul Islam, defence adviser to Prime Minister Tarique Rahman, holding the rank of a state minister

== See also ==
- List of educational institutions in Comilla District
