= AKM Shamsul Islam =

Bangladeshi politician, retired army general

- এ.কে.এম. শামছুল ইসলাম
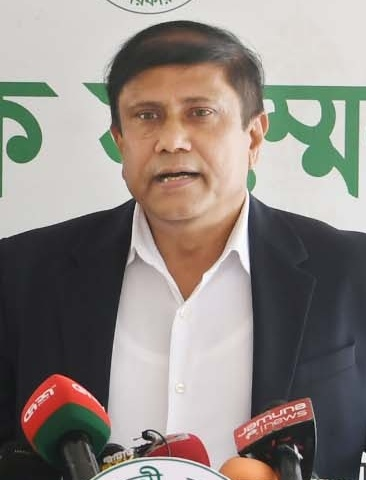
- Islam in 2026

Defence Adviser to the Prime Minister of Bangladesh
- Incumbent
- Assumed office 17 February 2026
- Prime Minister: Tarique Rahman
- Preceded by: Khalilur Rahman (as National Security Adviser)

Personal details
- Born: 20 May 1970 (age 56) Mymensingh District, Bangladesh
- Party: Bangladesh Nationalist Party (BNP)
- Education: PhD in Nuclear Security
- Alma mater: Bangladesh Military Academy; Cumilla Cadet College; Philippine Christian University; Defence Services Command and Staff College; Bangladesh University of Professionals; Armed Forces of the Philippines Command and General Staff College; Jahangirnagar University; Nanjing Artillery Academy; Joint Services Command and Staff College; Bangladesh Open University
- Occupation: Politician, Security Analyst
- Awards: Osmani Gold Medal (BMA); United Nations Medal

Military service
- Branch/service: Bangladesh Army
- Years of service: 1989-2018
- Rank: Brigadier General
- Unit: Regiment of Artillery
- Commands: CO of Medium Regiment Artillery; Brigade Commander of 11th Artillery Brigade; Deputy Contingent Commander, United Nations peacekeeping, MONUSCO; Staff Officer to Force Commander, MONUC; Directing Staff, Defence Services Command and Staff College; Chief Instructor, School of Artillery; Chief Coordinator, Nuclear Security and Physical Protection System Cell (NSPC)
- Battles/wars: MONUC; MONUSCO; Chittagong Hill Tracts conflict

AKM Shamsul Islam (Bengali: এ.কে.এম. শামছুল ইসলাম) is a Bangladeshi politician, retired Bangladesh Army officer, and security analyst. He currently serves as the defence adviser to Prime Minister Tarique Rahman, holding the rank of a state minister. Previously, he was appointed as the chief security officer for Bangladesh Nationalist Party (BNP) chairperson Khaleda Zia and acting chairman Tarique Rahman. He is a member of the Bangladesh Nationalist Party.

== Early life and education ==
Shamsul Islam was born in Nandail Upazila of Mymensingh district. During his school years, he topped the Mymensingh district in Class 8 and received a talent pool scholarship. He passed SSC and HSC examinations from Cumilla Cadet College. He obtained a Bachelor of Science degree being First Class First from Chittagong University. He then obtained a Masters in Defense Studies degree with first class distinction from the Defense Services Command and Staff College and a Masters in Management from the Philippine Christian University with a gold medal. He also obtained a Masters in Military Technology from Bangladesh University of Professionals. He completed his Masters in Defense Studies from Bangladesh Open University. He also completed advanced military and strategic training in Bangladesh, Pakistan, the United Kingdom, China, the Philippines, Russia, and the United States. Later, he obtained a PhD degree in Nuclear Security of Bangladesh from Jahangirnagar University.

== Military career ==
Shamsul Islam was commissioned into the Bangladesh Army in 1989 after completing the 21st long course at the Bangladesh Military Academy. He received Osmani Gold Medal in Bangladesh Military Academy for best academic performance. Shamsul Islam commanded an artillery regiment as well as an artillery brigade. He served in the United Nations Peacekeeping Mission in the Democratic Republic of the Congo (DR Congo) as a Staff Officer to the Force Commander and also as Deputy Contingent Commander. During his deployment as a UN peacekeeper in the Democratic Republic of the Congo (DR Congo), the local people were so fond of him that they held a rally demanding that he be made President of the DR Congo. He also served in Iraq as a Training Specialist and Adviser, contributing to capacity-building and professional development initiatives.

== Political career ==
After retiring from the army, Shamsul Islam joined the Bangladesh Nationalist Party (BNP). In 2025, he sought nomination from the BNP for the Mymensingh-9 (Nandail) constituency in the national elections.

On 17 December 2025, he was appointed as the chief security officer to oversee the security of BNP chairperson Khaleda Zia and acting chairman Tarique Rahman. Following Tarique Rahman's appointment as Prime Minister, Shamsul Islam was made the defence adviser to Prime Minister Tarique Rahman, with the rank of a state minister.
