= Salim Uddin =

Bangladeshi politician

Member of Parliament from Sylhet-5
- In office 29 December 2018 – 5 January 2014
- Preceded by: Hafiz Ahmed Mazumder
- Succeeded by: Hafiz Ahmed Mazumder

Personal details
- Born: 6 April 1960 (age 66) Nalbahar village, Tilpara Union, Beanibazar Upazila, Sylhet, East Pakistan
- Party: Jatiya Party
- Parents: Ashad Uddin (father); Azizun Necha (mother)
- Education: University of Greenwich

Salim Uddin (Bengali: সেলিম উদ্দিন) is a Bangladeshi politician and the former Member of Parliament from Sylhet-5.

== Early life ==
Salim Uddin was born on 6 April 1960 in Nalbahar village of Tilpara Union in Beanibazar Upazila of Sylhet district of then East Pakistan. His father's name is Ashad Uddin and mother's name is Azizun Necha. He completed his undergrad at the University of Greenwich.

== Career ==
Salim Uddin started his political life by joining Jatiya Party in 1996. He is the International Affairs Advisor to Jatiya Party Chairman GM Quader. He is the former president of Sylhet District Jatiya Party.

Uddin was elected to Parliament from Sylhet-5 as a candidate of Jatiya Party in 2014.

In the 9th National Parliament, he served as the Opposition Whip and as a member of the Standing Committee of the National Parliament on Foreign Affairs.

In 2017, there was a viral video of him arguing with a traffic officer after his car tried to enter the wrong way.
