= Gonobahini (1971) =

Civilian component of Mukti Bahini

Gono Bahini (Bengali: গণবাহিনী" People's Army") was a component of the Mukti Bahini, the guerrilla force which fought against the Pakistan Army during the Bangladesh Liberation War in 1971. The Gono Bahini was composed exclusively of civilians.
