= Mahmudur Rahman Majumdar =

Bangladeshi politician (1922-2011)

Mahmudur Rahman Mazumdar

Member of Parliament for Sylhet-5
- In office 1986–1991
- Succeeded by: Obaidul Haque

Personal details
- Born: 25 December 1922 Katigorah, Assam, British India
- Died: 19 December 2011 (aged 88) Dhaka, Bangladesh
- Party: Jatiya Party
- Relations: Hafiz Ahmed Mazumder (nephew)
- Occupation: Politician

Military service
- Allegiance: Bangladesh; Pakistan (Before 1971)
- Branch/service: Pakistan Army; Bangladesh Army
- Years of service: 1949-1974
- Rank: Brigadier General
- Unit: Punjab Regiment; East Bengal Regiment
- Commands: Commandant of East Bengal Regimental Centre; Station Commander, Chittagong
- Battles/wars: Indo-Pakistani War of 1965; Bangladesh Liberation War(as POW)

Mahmudur Rahman Majumdar (25 December 1922-19 December 2011) was a Bangladesh Army brigadier who was the most senior ethnic Bengali officer in East Pakistan during the Bangladesh Liberation War.

== Early life and education ==
Mazumdar was born into a Bengali Muslim family on 25 December 1922 in the village of Chandinagar in Katigora Thana, Cachar district, Assam Province, British Raj. His ancestral home was in the village of Bolramer Chok in Kaskanakpur Union, Zakiganj Upazila, Sylhet District, Bangladesh. His father was Wajid Ali Mazumdar.

After completing his primary and secondary education locally, Mazumdar studied at the Murari Chand College in Sylhet, where he graduated with a Bachelor of Arts.

== Military career ==
In 1947, he joined the Pakistan Army. On 30 July 1949, he was commissioned with the 2nd Graduate Course in the Punjab Regiment of the Pakistan Army. During the Indo-Pakistani War of 1965, he commanded the Sialkot Sector. He earned the status of brigadier in 1969.

== Bangladesh Liberation War ==
Majumdar defected from the Pakistan Army at the start of the Bangladesh Liberation War, when he was the commanding officer of the East Pakistan Regiment Centre After Yahya Khan postponed the assembly session in March, Brigadier Majumdar met a group of Awami League leaders and pledged military support for the creation of Bangladesh. He was in charge of unloading weapons from a ship called MV Swat, and his refusal to do so put him in direct conflict with the army chief, Abdul Hamid Khan, Tikka Khan, and other high officials. Realizing that the Pakistani army aimed to launch a massive strike on the Bengalis, Majumdar secretly devised a plan to launch a pre-emptive strike with the support of the numerous East Bengal Regiments and the East Pakistan Rifles. He conveyed this plan to Sheikh Mujib and Colonel Osmani and assured them of Bengali military superiority at that time. However, Mujib refused to give permission, as he was tricked into believing that Yahya Khan was going to accept a political solution.

He was arrested and charged with treason by the Pakistan Army during the war. In an interview, he stated that Major Generals Khadim Hossain Raja and Mitha Khan tricked him into coming to Dhaka by claiming that Tikka Khan had called an urgent meeting with every senior officer. According to Major General Khadim Hossain Raja, he had tricked Majumdar by asking him to talk to the restive 2 EBR at Joydebpur in his capacity as 'Papa Tiger'. In reality, he was taken to the house of Brigadier Arbab, who he considered a close friend and colleague. Arbab betrayed him by placing him under house arrest.

On March 27, he was officially arrested and taken into custody. He was later brutally tortured in custody. Moreover, his relatives were also captured and tortured. He was forced into signing a confession stating that he had planned a mutiny against the army. Later on, he was transferred to Wana Fort and was eventually repatriated to independent Bangladesh in 1973.

== Political career ==
Majumdar, after retiring from the Bangladesh Army, joined the Jatiya Party. He was elected to parliament from Sylhet twice.

== Awards and decorations ==
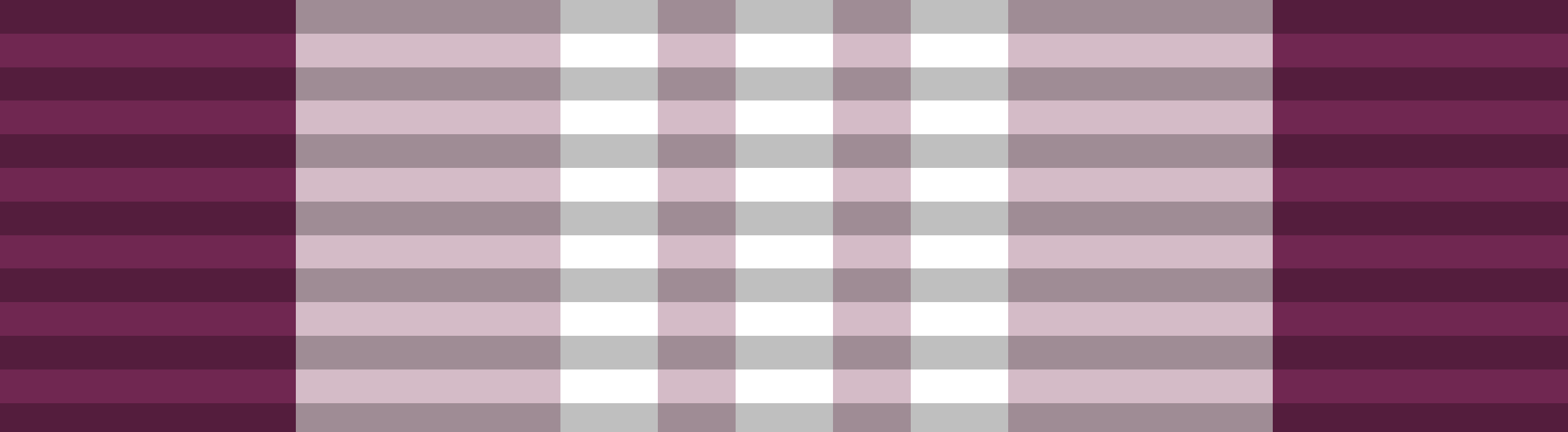

Tamgha-e-Quaid-e-Azam (Medal of the Great Leader)	Sitara-e-Harb 1965 War (War Star 1965)	Tamgha-e-Jang 1965 War (War Medal 1965)	Tamgha-e-Jamhuria (Republic Commemoration Medal) 1956

== Death ==
Mazumdar died on 19 December 2011.
