= Pubali Bank =

Commercial bank in Bangladesh

Pubali Bank PLC.
- Company type: Public limited company
- Industry: Banking; Financial services
- Predecessor: Eastern Mercantile Bank Limited (1959 – 1971)
- Founded: 1959; 67 years ago 1972; 54 years ago (as Pubali Bank)
- Headquarters: 26 Dilkusha Commercial Area, Dhaka, Bangladesh
- Number of locations: 707
- Area served: Bangladesh
- Key people: Monzurur Rahman (Chairman)
- Products: Retail banking; Corporate banking; Mortgage loans; Credit cards; Finance and insurance
- Operating income: ▲ ৳17.718 billion (US$140 million) (2018)
- Net income: ▲ ৳3.627 billion (US$30 million) (2018)
- Total assets: ▲ ৳410.226 billion (US$3.3 billion) (2018)
- Total equity: Transcom Group (stakeholder)
- Website: www.pubalibangla.com

Pubali Bank PLC. (Bengali: পূবালী ব্যাংক পিএলসি.) is the largest commercial bank in Bangladesh. It has more branches than any other autonomous bank in the country. Monzurur Rahman is the present chairman of the bank.

== History ==
Pubali Bank was started in East Pakistan as Eastern Mercantile Bank Limited in 1959 under the Bank Companies Act 1913 by Bengali businessmen. After the independence of Bangladesh in 1971 the bank was nationalized under Bangladesh Bank's (nationalisation) Ordinance and renamed as Pubali Bank.

Subsequently, Pubali Bank was denationalized in the year 1983 as a private bank and renamed as Pubali Bank Limited.

The bank signed a ৳100 million loan agreement with Uttara Finance and Investments Limited in 2007.

In 2009, Pubali Bank had reserves worth ৳88.89 billion. It's non-performing loans went from 18.4 per cent in 2004 to 2.96 per cent.

In February 2014, High Court Division, Supreme Court of Bangladesh removed eight members of the board of directors including chairman Hafiz Ahmed Mazumder for not possessing the minimum required shares in response to a petition filed by Shafee Ahmed Chowdhury, a shareholder of the bank.

৳5 million went missing in the bank's branch in Chittagong in 2016 following which five employees of the bank were arrested. Three employees of the bank in Chittagong were jailed for embezzling ৳128.6 million from the bank. In January, Safiul Alam Khan Chowdhury was appointed managing director of Pubali Bank. In May, Habibur Rahman was appointed chairman of the bank. That's It Fashions Limited, a subsidiary of Ha-Meem Group, announced plans to purchase 11 million shares of Pubali Bank.

In May 2019, Azizul Huq was elected chairman of the Pubali Bank.

In 2021, Bangladesh Securities and Exchange Commission approved ৳5 billion perpetual bonds of the bank. It signed a US$52 million loan agreement with Bank Muscat.

The Pubali Bank donated ৳1 million to Bishwo Shahitto Kendro in October 2022. It received US$50 million from the British International Investment.

== Board of directors ==
Name	Position	Reference
Monzurur Rahman	Chairman	
Moniruddin Ahmed	Director	
Habibur Rahman	Director	
Ahmed Shafi Choudhury	Director	
Fahim Ahmed Faruk Chowdhury	Director	
Rumana Sharif	Director	
M. Kabiruzzaman Yaqub	Director	
Musa Ahmed	Director	
Azizur Rahman	Director	
Md. Abdur Razzak Mondal	Director	
Rana Laila Hafiz	Director	
Mustafa Ahmed	Director	
Shahdeen Malik	Independent Director	
Mohammad Naushad Ali Chowdhury	Independent Director	
Mohammad Ali	Managing Director	
