= Bangladesh Red Crescent Society =

Bangladeshi humanitarian organization

Bangladesh Red Crescent Society (BDRCS)
- বাংলাদেশ রেড ক্রিসেন্ট সোসাইটি
- BDRCS Logo
- Formation: 16 December 1971
- Headquarters: Dhaka, Bangladesh
- Official language: Bengali, English
- President: President Mirza Fakhrul Islam Alamgir
- Chairman: Barrister Md. Abdus Salam
- Vice Chairman: Prof. Dr. Md. Rafiqul Kabir
- Secretary General: Md. Habibur Rahman Khan
- Affiliations: International Red Cross and Red Crescent Movement
- Website: bdrcs.org

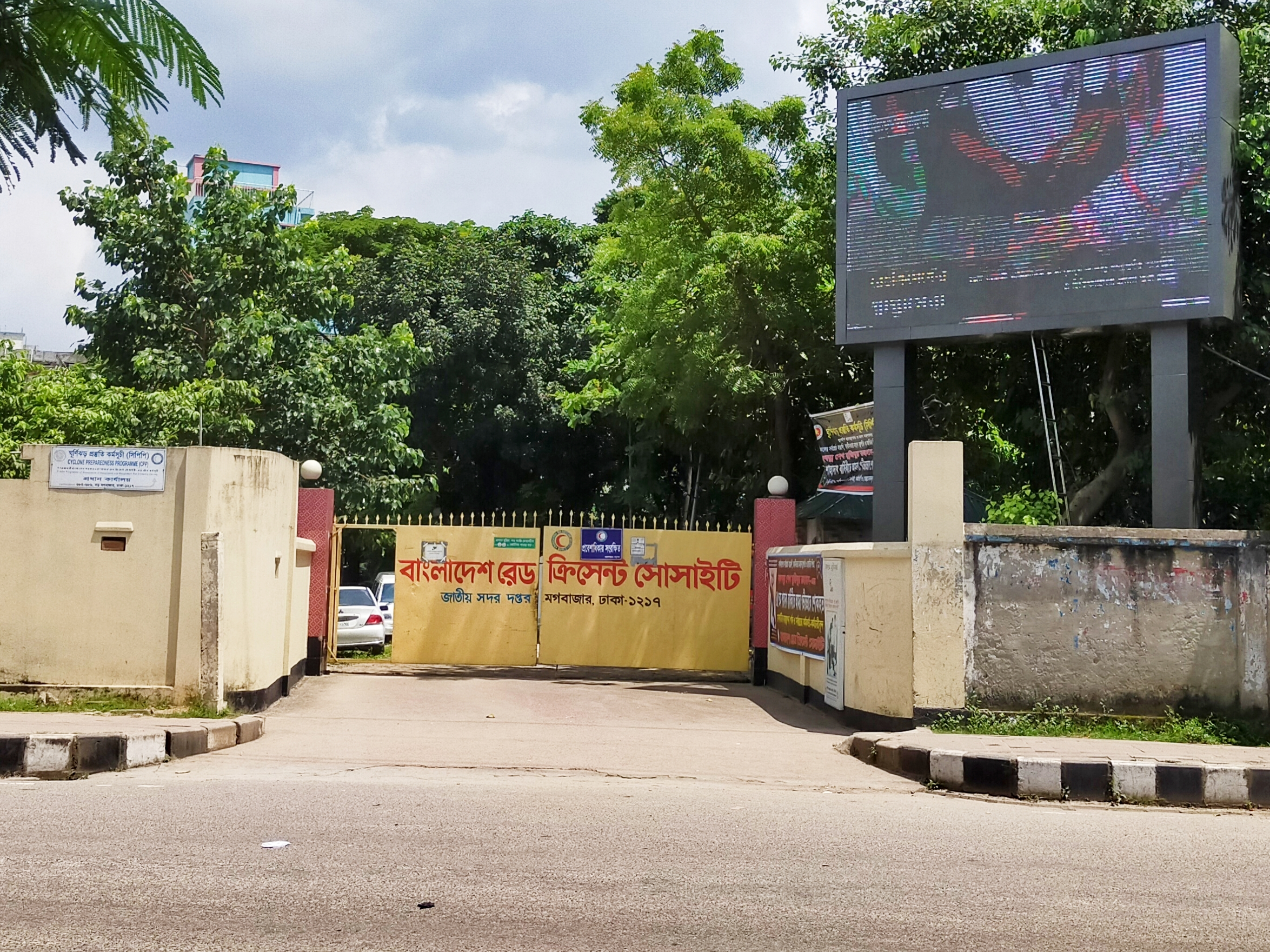
Bangladesh Red Crescent Society, National Headquarters, Dhaka

The Bangladesh Red Crescent Society (BDRCS; Bengali: বাংলাদেশ রেড ক্রিসেন্ট সোসাইটি, romanized: bānlādēśa rēḍa krisēnṭa sōsā'iṭi) is a humanitarian organization and auxiliary to the government of Bangladesh. Formerly consisting of the eastern branches of the Pakistan Red Cross Society, the organization was established in 1973 as the Bangladesh Red Cross Society through the President's Order 26. It changed its name to Bangladesh Red Crescent Society in 1988 while the country adopted Islam as the constitutional religion. It has its headquarters in Dhaka and also has 68 units. A unit is constituted in each of the 64 districts and in the metropolitan cities of Dhaka. Chittagong, Rajshahi, and Khulna. The society has played an instrumental role in relief and rehabilitation during floods, cyclones, and other natural disasters, which are frequent in various parts of Bangladesh. They are also one of the largest sources of blood donation throughout the country.

== Organizational structure ==
The president of Bangladesh is the head of the Bangladesh Red Crescent Society by designation. Under his supervision, a managing board runs the organization.

=== Management ===
The managing board consists of 15 members. There is a chairman, a vice-chairman, a treasurer, and 12 general board members. As of June 2022, the current postholders are:

- Chairman: Barrister Md. Abdus Salam
- Vice-chairman: Prof. Dr. Md. Rafiqul Kabir
- Secretarty General: Md. Habibur Rahman Khan
- Treasurer: Dr. Abu Md. Mofakhkharul Islam (Rana)

Under the managing board, there are 2 divisional chiefs and 19 directors responsible for each of the departments that run the organization. This senior management is presided over by a secretary general and a deputy secretary general. The current secretary general of BDRCS is Md. Habibur Rahman Khan, and the current deputy secretary general is Md. Ehsan-E-Elahi.

== See also ==
- List of Red Cross and Red Crescent Societies
- International Red Cross and Red Crescent Movement
- International Federation of Red Cross and Red Crescent Societies
- Emblems of the International Red Cross and Red Crescent Movement
