= Sylhet-5 =

Constituency of Bangladesh's Jatiya Sangsad

Coordinates: 25.01°N 92.26°E

- Constituency for the Jatiya Sangsad
- District: Sylhet District
- Division: Sylhet Division
- Electorate: 428,748 (2026)

Current constituency
- Created: 1973
- Party: Khelafat Majlis
- Member: Mufti Abul Hasan
- ← 232 Sylhet-4 234 Sylhet-6 →

Sylhet-5 is a constituency represented in the Jatiya Sangsad (National Parliament) of Bangladesh since 2026 by Mufti Abul Hasan of the Khelafat Majlis.

== Boundaries ==
The constituency encompasses Kanaighat and Zakiganj upazilas.

== History ==
The constituency was created for the first general elections in newly independent Bangladesh, held in 1973.

== Members of Parliament ==
Election	Member	Party
1973	A. Zahur Miah	Independent
1979	Abul Hasnat Md. Abdul Hai	Jatiya Party
Major Boundary Changes
1986	Mahmudur Rahman Majumdar	Jatiya Party
1988	Mahmudur Rahman Majumdar	Jatiya Party
1991	Obaidul Haque	Islami Oikya Jote
Feb 1996	Abdul Kahir Chowdhury	Bangladesh Nationalist Party
Jun 1996	Hafiz Ahmed Mazumder	Awami League
2001	Farid Uddin Chowdhury	Bangladesh Jamaat-e-Islami
2008	Hafiz Ahmed Mazumder	Awami League
2014	Salim Uddin	Jatiya Party (Ershad)
2018	Hafiz Ahmed Mazumder	Awami League
2024	Husam Uddin Chowdhury	Independent
2026	Mufti Abul Hasan	Khelafat Majlis

== Elections ==
=== Elections in the 2020s ===
General Election 2026: Sylhet-5 (Note: The results given by The Business Standard are incomplete.)
Party	Candidate	Votes	%	±%
Khelafat Majlis	Mufti Abul Hasan	79,355	38.4	N/A
JUI	Ubaidullah Farooq	69,774	33.7	N/A
Independent	Mamunur Rashid	57,251	27.7	N/A
BML	Md. Bilal Uddin	372	0.2	N/A
Majority		9,581	4.6	N/A
Turnout		206,752	48.2	N/A
Registered electors		428,748		
Khelafat Majlis gain from Independent				

=== Elections in the 2010s ===
Salim Uddin was elected unopposed in the 2014 general election after opposition parties withdrew their candidacies in a boycott of the election.

=== Elections in the 2000s ===
General Election 2008: Sylhet-5
Party	Candidate	Votes	%	±%
AL	Hafiz Ahmed Mazumder	109,690	54.7	+21.3
JP(E)	Farid Uddin Choudhury	78,061	38.9	N/A
Jamiat Ulema-e-Islam Bangladesh	Ubydullah Faruk	8,946	4.5	N/A
Independent	Kutub Uddin Ahmed Sikder	2,599	1.3	+1.1
KSJL	Oliur Rahman	829	0.4	N/A
Independent	Zobayer Ahmed Chowdhury	331	0.2	N/A
Majority		31,629	15.8	+0.1
Turnout		200,456	82.1	+16.1
AL gain from Jamaat				

General Election 2001: Sylhet-5
Party	Candidate	Votes	%	±%
Jamaat	Farid Uddin Chowdhury	77,750	49.1	+25
AL	Hafiz Ahmed Mazumder	52,885	33.4	+8.2
IJOF	M. R. Haq	23,538	14.9	N/A
Jatiya Party (M)	Nazma Akter Chowdhury	3,389	2.1	N/A
Independent	Kutub Uddin Ahmed Sikder	388	0.2	N/A
Independent	M. A. Matin Chowdhury	317	0.2	N/A
Majority		24,865	15.7	+14.5
Turnout		158,267	66.0	+3.6
Jamaat gain from AL				

=== Elections in the 1990s ===
General Election June 1996: Sylhet-5
Party	Candidate	Votes	%	±%
AL	Hafiz Ahmed Mazumder	29,483	25.2	+3.5
Jamaat	Farid Uddin Chowdhury	28,120	24.1	+7.3
JP(E)	Md. Abdul Rakib	15,054	12.9	−1.8
Sammilita Sangram Parishad	Md. Habibur Rahman	14,356	12.3	N/A
Jamiat Ulema-e-Islam Bangladesh	Alim Uddin	13,325	11.4	N/A
IOJ	Obaidul Haque	10,425	8.9	−20.1
BNP	M. A. Matin Chowdhury	4,860	4.2	−11.9
Jatiya Samajtantrik Dal-JSD	A. T. M. Abdul Mustaqim	455	0.4	−0.3
Zaker Party	Khaja Moin Uddin Ahmed	364	0.3	−0.3
Independent	Md. Mohiuddin Ahmed	237	0.2	N/A
Jatiya Janata Party (Nurul Islam)	Md. Atikur Rahman	212	0.2	N/A
Majority		1,363	1.2	−4.4
Turnout		116,891	62.4	+18.5
AL gain from BNP				

General Election 1991: Sylhet-5
Party	Candidate	Votes	%	±%
IOJ	Obaidul Haque	26,267	29.0	
AL	Hafiz Ahmed Mazumder	19,682	21.7	
Jamaat	Farid Uddin Chowdhury	15,207	16.8	
BNP	Harris Chowdhury	14,596	16.1	
JP(E)	M. A. Matin Chowdhury	13,298	14.7	
Jatiya Samajtantrik Dal-JSD	A. T. M. Abdul Muntakim	632	0.7	
Zaker Party	Md. Abdul Karim	523	0.6	
JSD	Md. Mohiuddin Ahmed	388	0.4	
Majority		6,585	5.6	
Turnout		90,593	43.9	
IOJ gain from JP(E)				
