= Zakiganj Upazila =

Zakiganj জকিগঞ্জ
- Upazila
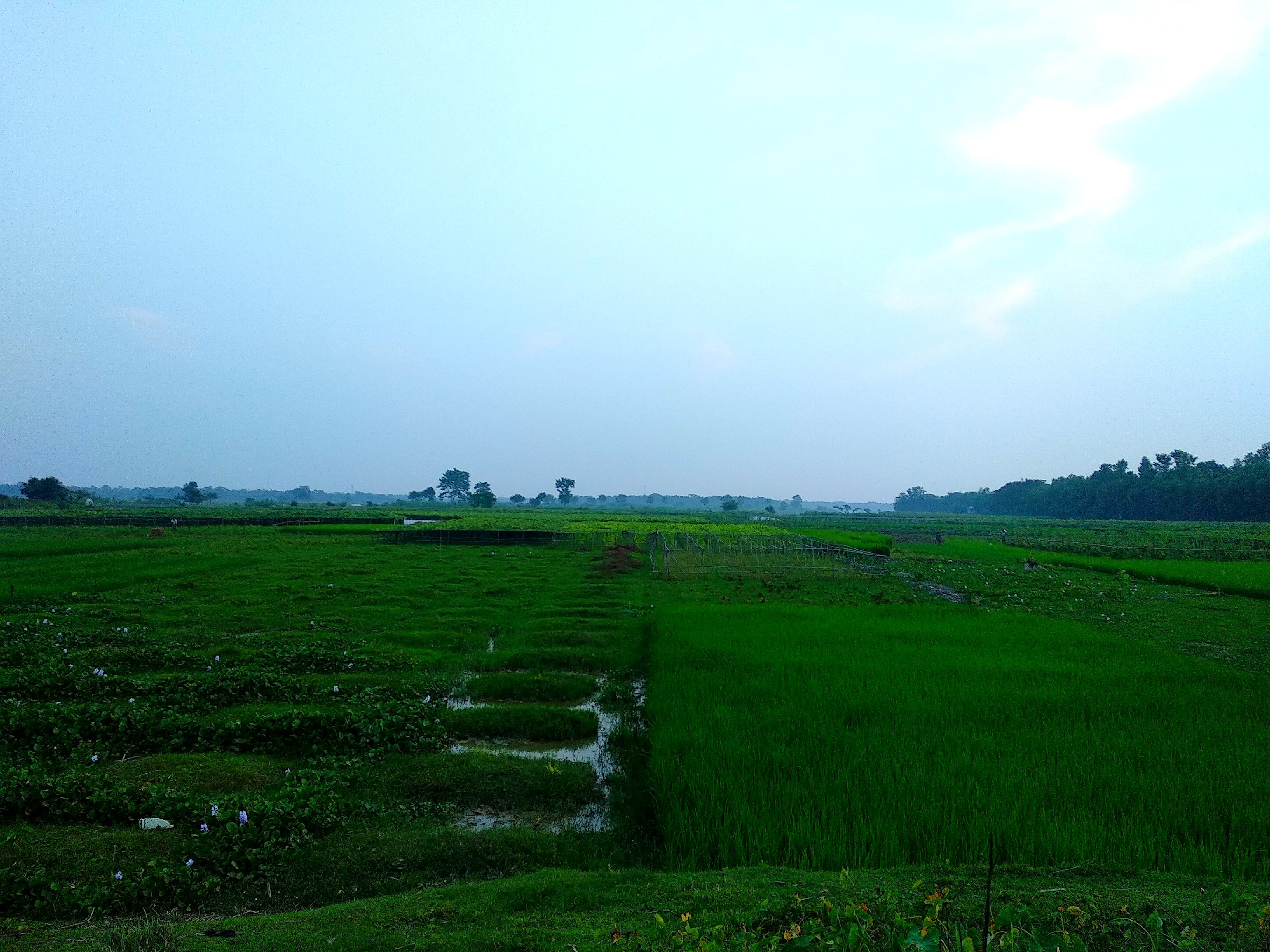
- Fields in Zakiganj

- Coordinates: 24°52.7′N 92°22.3′E
- Country: Bangladesh
- Division: Sylhet
- District: Sylhet

Area
  - Total: 265.68 km^{2} (102.58 sq mi)

Population (2022)
  - Total: 267,317
  - Density: 1,006.2/km^{2} (2,605.9/sq mi)
- Demonym(s): Zakiganji, Zokigonji, Zokigoinji
- Time zone: UTC+6 (BST)
- Postal code: 3190
- Area code: 08232
- Website: Website

Zakiganj (Bengali: জকিগঞ্জ) is an upazila of Sylhet District in Sylhet Division, Bangladesh.

Zakiganj Upazila mauza geocode map

== History ==
There are a few theories behind the name of Zakiganj. The first is that it is derived from Shah Zaki, a pir who established a khanqah on the banks of the Kushiyara River. A ganj, a Perso-Bengali suffix meaning 'marketplace' or 'neighbourhood', was then set up around the khanqah. In memory of Shah Zaki, nearby places are named Pirerkhal and the village Pirerchok. Another theory is that it is named after a man named Ghulam Zaki Majumdar, whose brother Karim Majumdar is who Karimganj district is said to have been named after.

Zakiganj was established as a thana in 1947 and was previously a part of the greater Karimganj district. Along with Karimganj, Zakiganj was to be a part of the Dominion of India, but this was prevented by a delegation led by Sheikh Mujibur Rahman. In the aftermath of the Bangladesh Liberation War of 1971, mass graves were found in Atgram Bazar and Kaliganj Bazar. Zakiganj became an upazila on 1 August 1983.

A 17th-century stone inscription was found in the Ghayebi Dighi Masjid in Barothakuri, and it is now on display at the Bangladesh National Museum.

== Geography ==
Zakiganj is located at 24.8778°N 92.3722°E. It has a total area of 265.68 km^{2} (102.58 sq mi).

It is situated on the north bank of the Kushiyara River, opposite Karimganj town of Assam, India.

== Demographics ==
Religions in Zakiganj Upazila (2022)
Religion	Percent
Islam	90.49%
Hinduism	9.50%
Other or not stated	0.01%

According to the 2022 Bangladeshi census, Zakiganj Upazila had 50,236 households and a population of 267,317. 11.00% of the population were under 5 years of age. Zakiganj had a literacy rate (age 7 and over) of 76.25%: 78.46% for males and 74.24% for females, and a sex ratio of 92.78 males for every 100 females. 51,413 (19.23%) lived in urban areas.

According to the 2011 Census of Bangladesh, Zakiganj Upazila had 40,548 households and a population of 237,137. 65,802 (27.75%) were under 10 years of age. Zakiganj had a literacy rate (age 7 and over) of 49.39%, compared to the national average of 51.8%, and a sex ratio of 1,021 females per 1,000 males. 20,806 (8.77%) lived in urban areas.

As of the 1991 Bangladesh census, Zakiganj has a population of 174,038. Males constitute 50.55% of the population, and females 49.45%. This upazila's eighteen-and-up population is 85,935. Zakiganj has an average literacy rate of 30.8% (7+ years), and the national average of 32.4% literate. 81.47% of people of Zakiganj were Muslim, 18.47% were Hindu, and 0.05% were Buddhist, Christian, and others.

== Points of interest ==
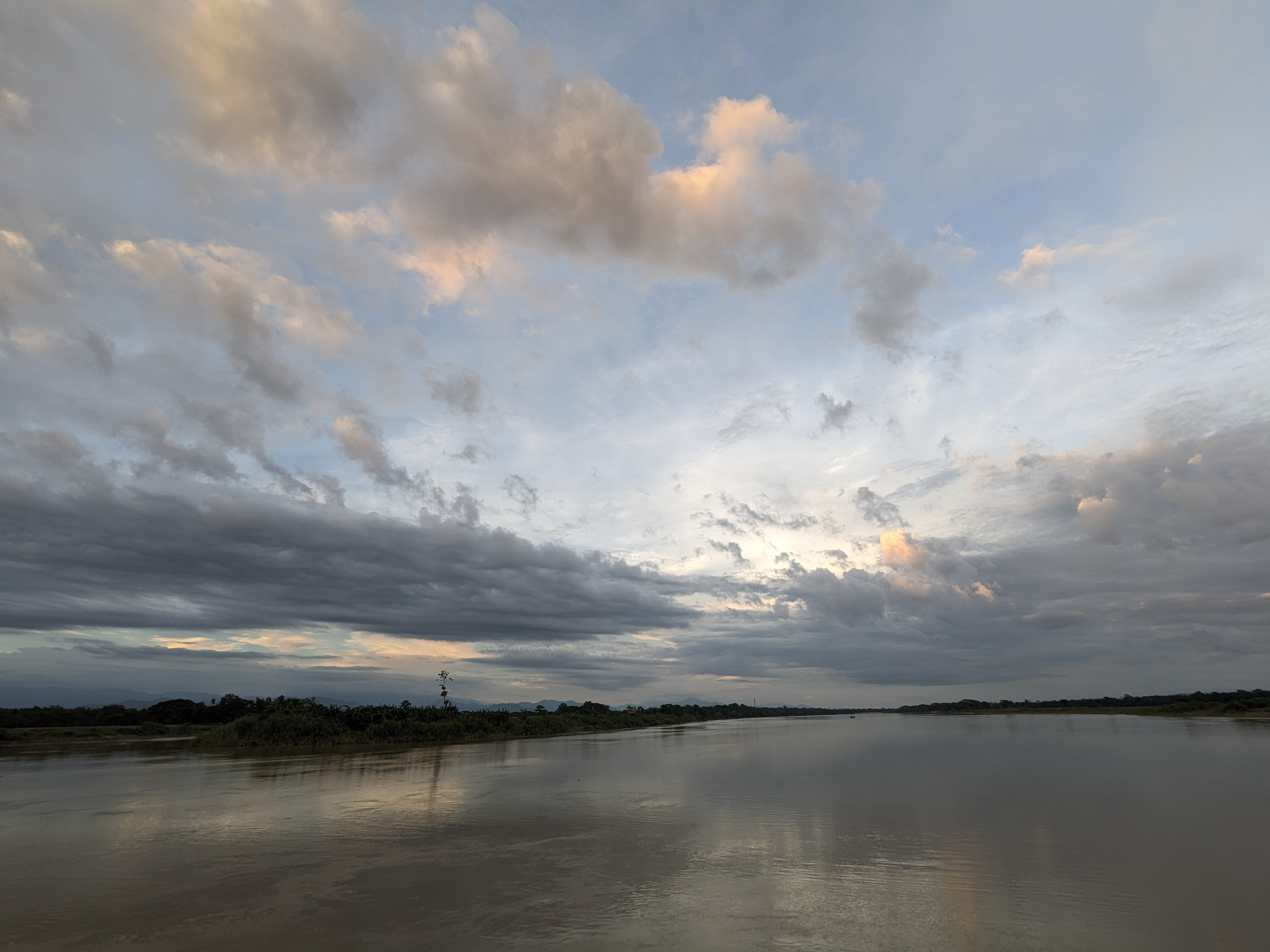
Derivation of Kushiyara River and Surma River from Barak River of India

- Derivation of two rivers (Kushiyara River and Surma River) from the Barak River of India
- Customs wharfage
- Hills of Atgram

== Administration ==
Zakiganj Upazila is divided into Zakiganj Municipality and nine union parishads: Barahal, Barathakuri, Birorsri, Kajalshar, Khaskanakpur, Kolachora, Manikpur, Sultanpur, and Zakiganj. The union parishads are subdivided into 108 mauzas and 278 villages.

Zakiganj Municipality is subdivided into 9 wards and 25 mahallas.

=== Upazila chairmen ===
List of chairmen
Number	Name	Term
01	Alhaj Shabbir Ahmad	
02	Alhaj Iqbal Ahmed Tapadar	
03	Arafat Ahmed Chowdhury	

== Notable people ==
- Abdul Kahir Chowdhury, Bangladesh Nationalist Party politician
- Abdul Latif Chowdhury Fultali,Sufi
- Akhlaq Choudhury, British High Court judge
- Hafiz Ahmed Mazumder, chairman of the Pubali Bank Board of Directors and Bangladesh Red Crescent Society
- Mahmudur Rahman Majumdar, brigadier
- Mohammad Abdul Haque, bureaucrat
- Obaidul Haque, Islamic teacher and politician
- Salman Shah, mainstream film actor
- Ubaidul Haq, former khatib of Baitul Mukarram

== See also ==
- Upazilas of Bangladesh
- Districts of Bangladesh
- Divisions of Bangladesh
- Administrative geography of Bangladesh
- Demographics of Bangladesh
