= Dhaka Central University =

Public university in Dhaka, Bangladesh

- ঢাকা কেন্দ্রীয় বিশ্ববিদ্যালয়
- Crest of Dhaka Central University
- Other name: Dhaka Kendriyo Bishwobiddaloy
- Motto: Learn, Create, Inspire
- Type: Public
- Established: February 8, 2026; 9 months ago
- Accreditation: UGC
- Budget: ৳24.92 crore (US$2.0 million) (2026-2027)
- Chancellor: President of Bangladesh
- Vice-Chancellor: Md. Lutfor Rahaman
- Students: 113,288+ (2025-2026)
- Undergraduates: 101,977+
- Postgraduates: 11,311+
- Location: Old Copyright Building (3rd Floor), 32, Justice S. M. Morshed Sarani, Agargaon, Sher-e-Bangla Nagar, Dhaka-1207 (Temporary office), Bangladesh; 23.775858°N 90.375550°E
- Campus: 75.72 acres (30.64 ha); Urban (7 College of Dhaka)
- Language: Bengali, English
- Nickname: DCU
- Mascot: Rising Sun 🌅
- Website: dcu.ac.bd

Dhaka Central University (DCU; Bengali: ঢাকা কেন্দ্রীয় বিশ্ববিদ্যালয়) is a public federal university in Dhaka, Bangladesh. It was established through the merger of seven prominent government colleges in the capital city. Under the provisions of the ordinance, it is the fifth autonomous public university in Bangladesh. Dhaka Central University was established by an ordinance promulgated on 8 February 2026. The ordinance was subsequently approved by the Parliament of Bangladesh as a bill on 10 April 2026.

== History ==
The decision to form the university was made by the University Grants Commission (UGC) following prolonged demands from students for better administration and academic management.

In February 2017, the government of Bangladesh affiliated seven major public colleges with the University of Dhaka to improve the standard of higher education and introduce a modern curriculum. These colleges had previously been under Dhaka University before being transferred to the National University in 1992. However, challenges in administration and inefficiencies led to student protests beginning in October 2023. In response, the government formed a special committee in December 2023 to assess the feasibility of establishing a new independent university.

In early 2025, students of Government Titumir College intensified their demand for the institution's upgrade to a university. Beginning in late January, they organized hunger strikes and road blockades, notably obstructing the Mohakhali–Gulshan road. The protests focused solely on achieving university status for Titumir College. The Ministry of Education acknowledged the concerns but emphasized the need for a thorough evaluation. Following assurances from government representatives, the students suspended their protests.

Clashes between Dhaka University and college students in January 2025 worsened the situation. Dhaka University decided to sever ties with the colleges, effective from the 2024–25 academic session. While existing students remained under DU's administration, an expert committee formed by the Ministry of Education in December 2024 was tasked with overseeing the transition.

On 16 March 2025, the UGC finalized the name Dhaka Central University (DCU) during a meeting held at its headquarters in Agargaon, Dhaka. The proposed name was to be submitted to the Ministry of Education for approval, followed by endorsement from the advisory council and formal issuance of an ordinance by the President of Bangladesh.

On 17 July 2025, Dhaka Central University received permission to start the admission process. On 8 February 2026, Government published ordinance regarding the Dhaka Central University. On April 10, 2026, the Bangladeshi Parliament subsequently passed the ordinance as a bill.

== Structure ==
Watermark of Dhaka Central University

Dhaka Central University is planned to be established at a separate permanent site. Until the construction of its permanent campus is completed, the university will conduct its academic and administrative activities on a temporary basis using rented buildings and facilities.

Seven government colleges in Dhaka will operate as the university's Attached Colleges. Under this arrangement, the colleges will retain their own names, infrastructure, and control over their movable and immovable properties. At the same time, Dhaka Central University will conduct its own academic programmes at the Attached Colleges.

Students will be admitted through a centralized admission test and may enrol either at the main campus or at one of the Attached Colleges. The university will also centrally administer MPhil and PhD programmes at the Attached Colleges, while providing faculty development and advanced training for academic staff. In addition, residential halls, student union elections, and a Teachers–Students Centre (TSC) are also planned.

== Administration ==
=== Administrator ===
Until the appointment of a vice-chancellor, Professor A. K. M. Elias, principal of Dhaka College and interim administrator of the seven colleges affiliated with the University of Dhaka, also served as the administrator of Dhaka Central University.

Administrators of Dhaka Central University
No.	Name	Assumed office	Left office
1	A. K. M. Elias	2025	2026

=== Vice-chancellors ===
The following individuals have served as vice-chancellors of Dhaka Central University:

No.	Name	Assumed office	Left office
1	A. S. Md. Abdul Haseeb	15 February 2026	16 March 2026
2	Md. Nurul Islam	16 March 2026	26 September 2026
3	Md. Lutfor Rahaman	27 September 2026	Incumbent

== Academic campuses ==
The following seven government colleges are attached to Dhaka Central University. The attached colleges will operate as the university's academic campuses:

Dhaka Central University
Coat of arms	Campus	Founded	Gender	College website
	Dhaka College	20 November 1841	Men's campus	dhakacollege.edu.bd
	Eden Mohila College	1873	Women's campus	emc.edu.bd
	Government Titumir College	7 May 1968	Coeducational campus	titumircollege.gov.bd
	Government Bangla College	20 June 1962	Coeducational campus	sarkaribanglacollege.gov.bd
	Begum Badrunnesa Government Girls' College	1948	Women's campus	www.bbggc.gov.bd
	Kabi Nazrul Government College	1874	Coeducational campus	kabinazrulcollege.gov.bd
	Government Shaheed Suhrawardy College	11 November 1949	Coeducational campus	gssc.college.gov.bd

== Gallery ==
Dhaka College campus

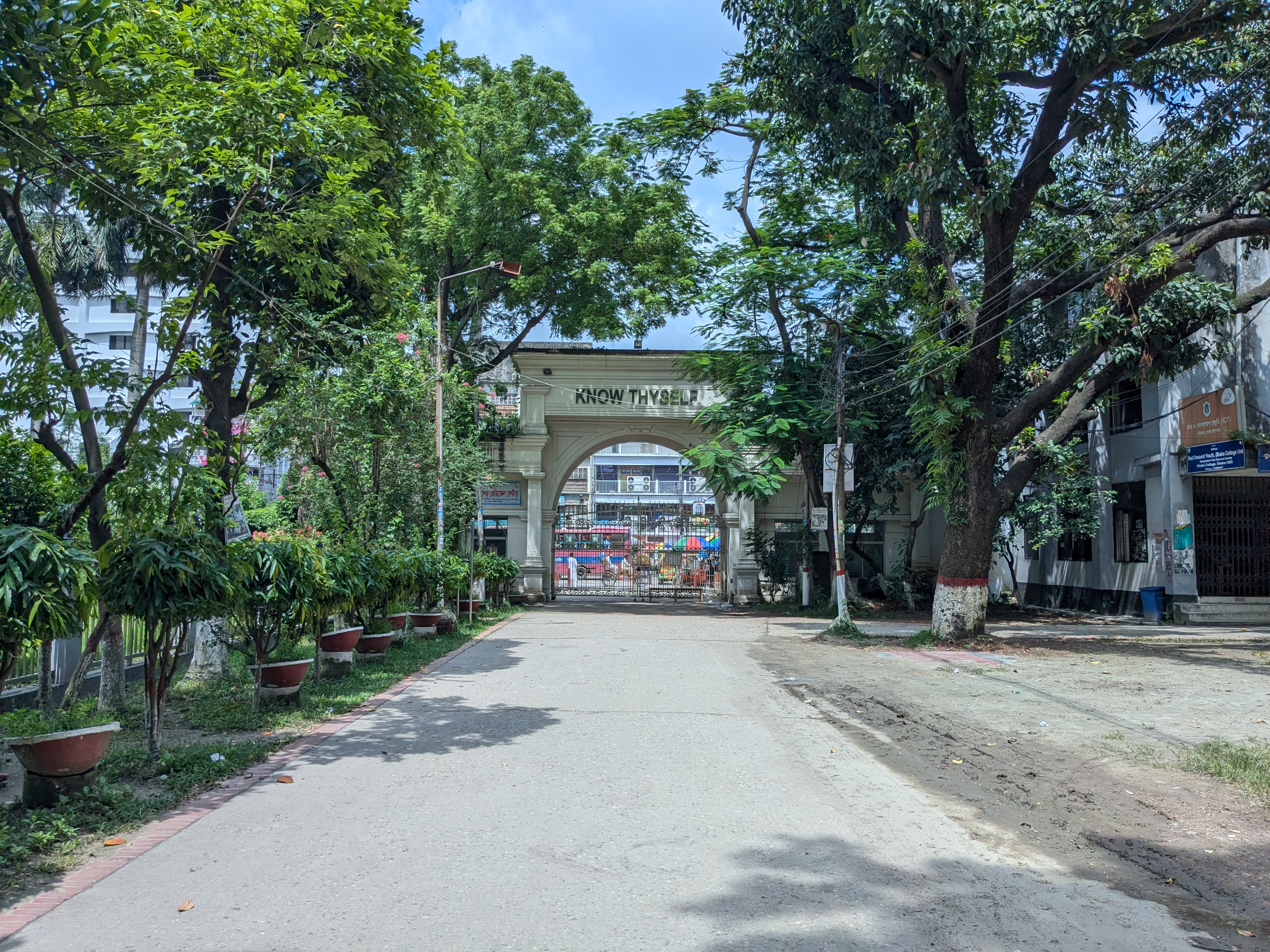
Dhaka Central University (exit of Dhaka College Campus).

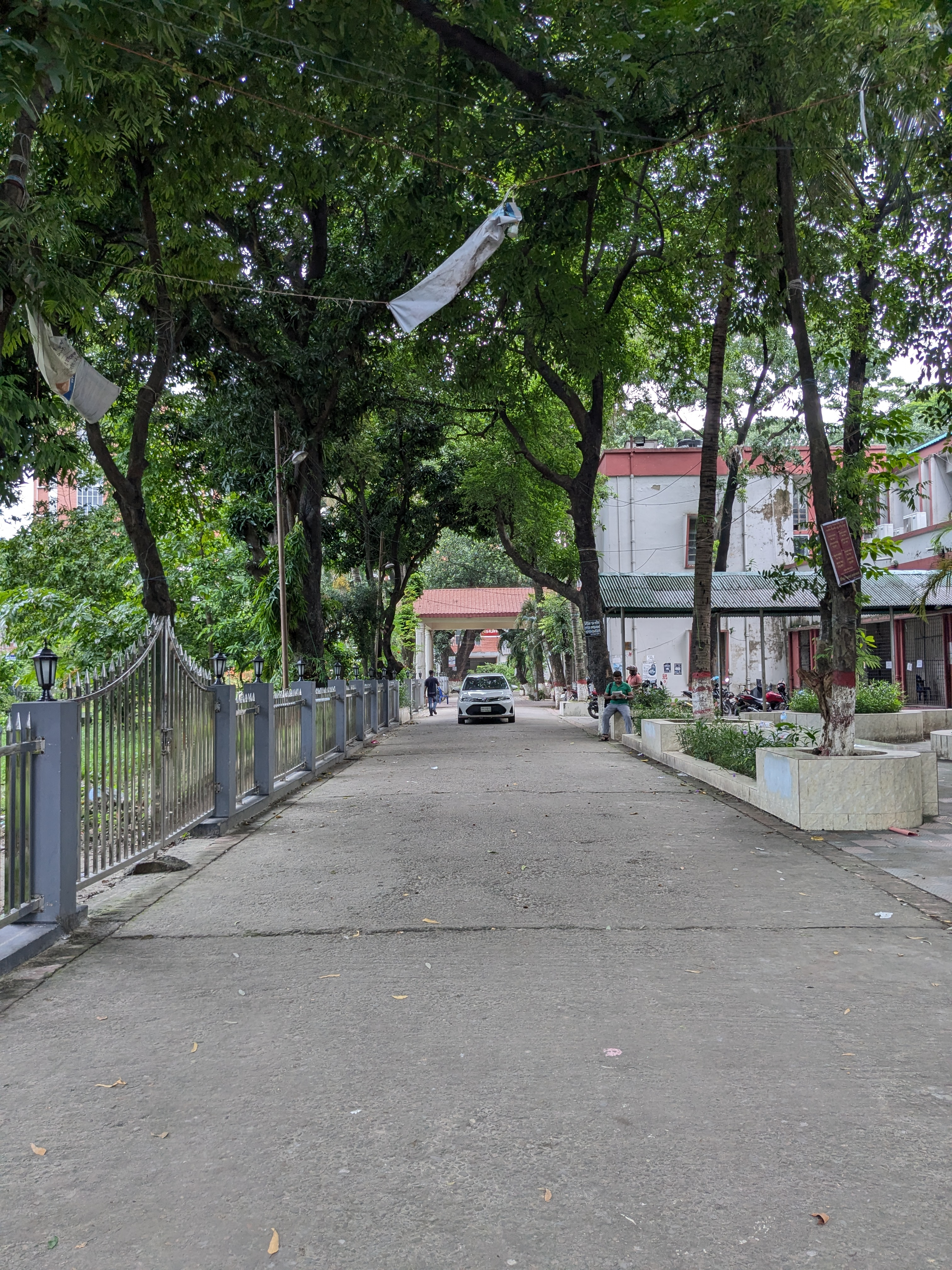
Dhaka Central University (street of the administrative building of Dhaka College Campus).

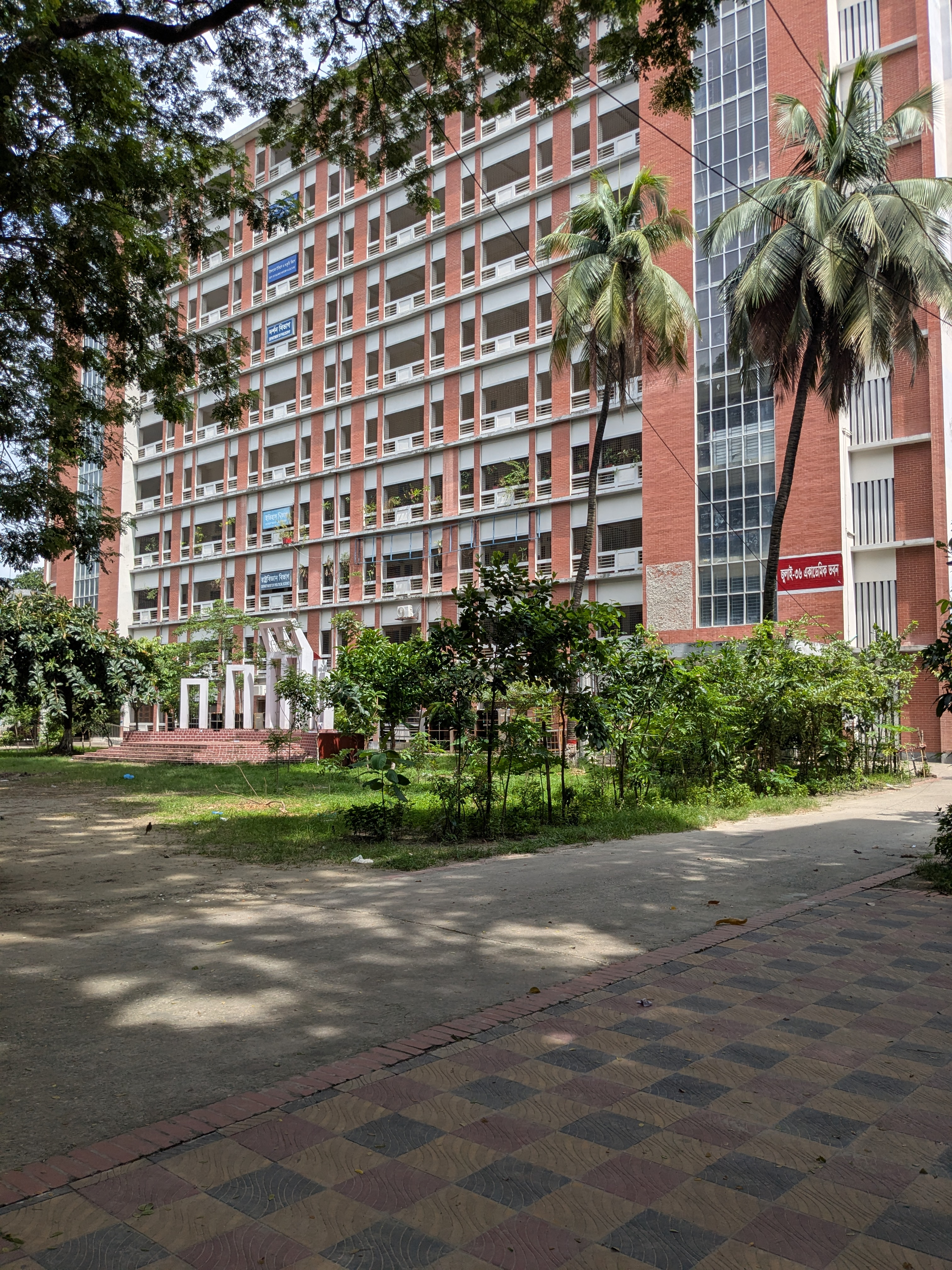
Dhaka Central University (Dhaka College Campus) July 36 Building.

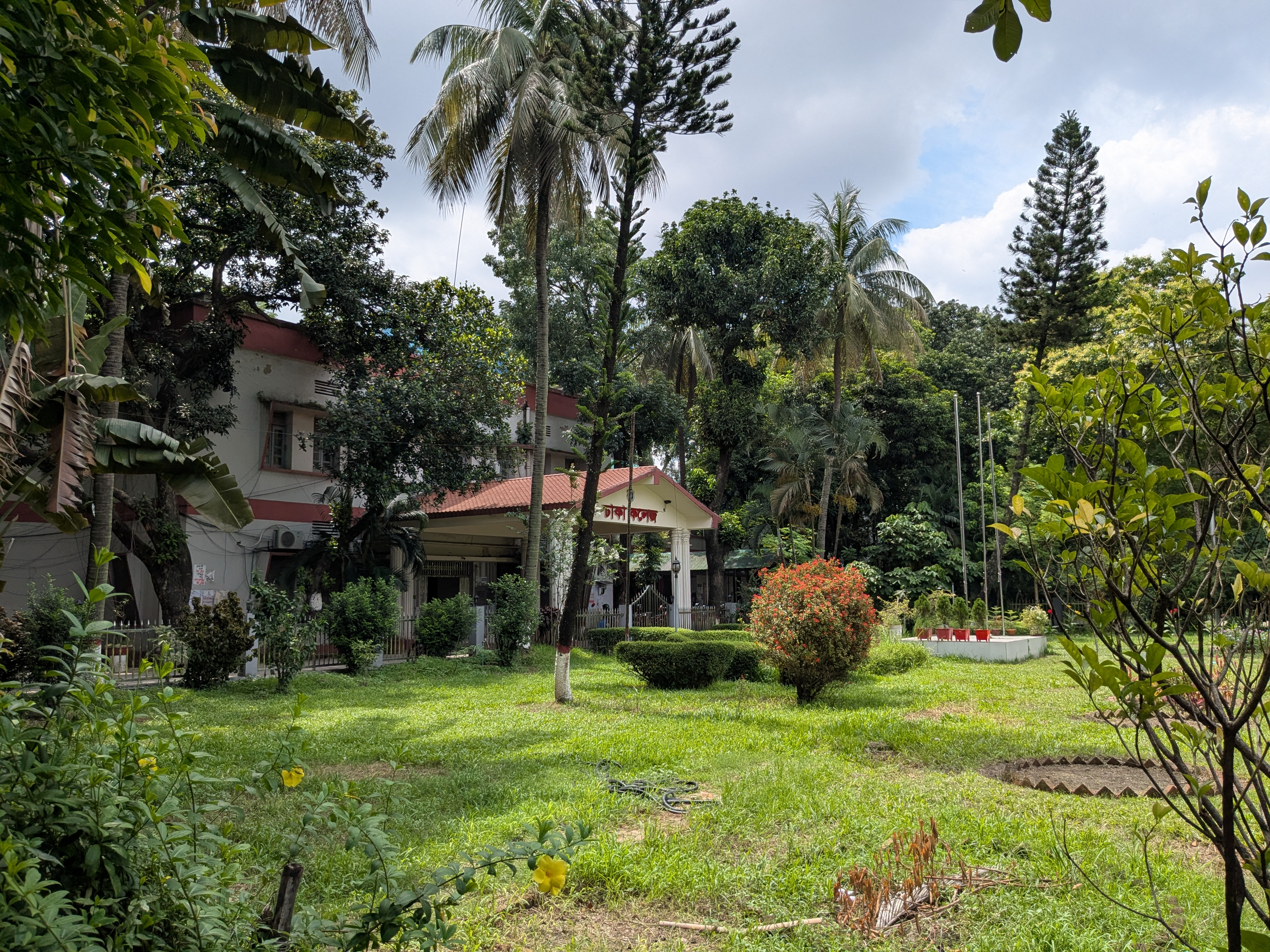
Administrative Building of the Dhaka College Campus of Dhaka Central University.

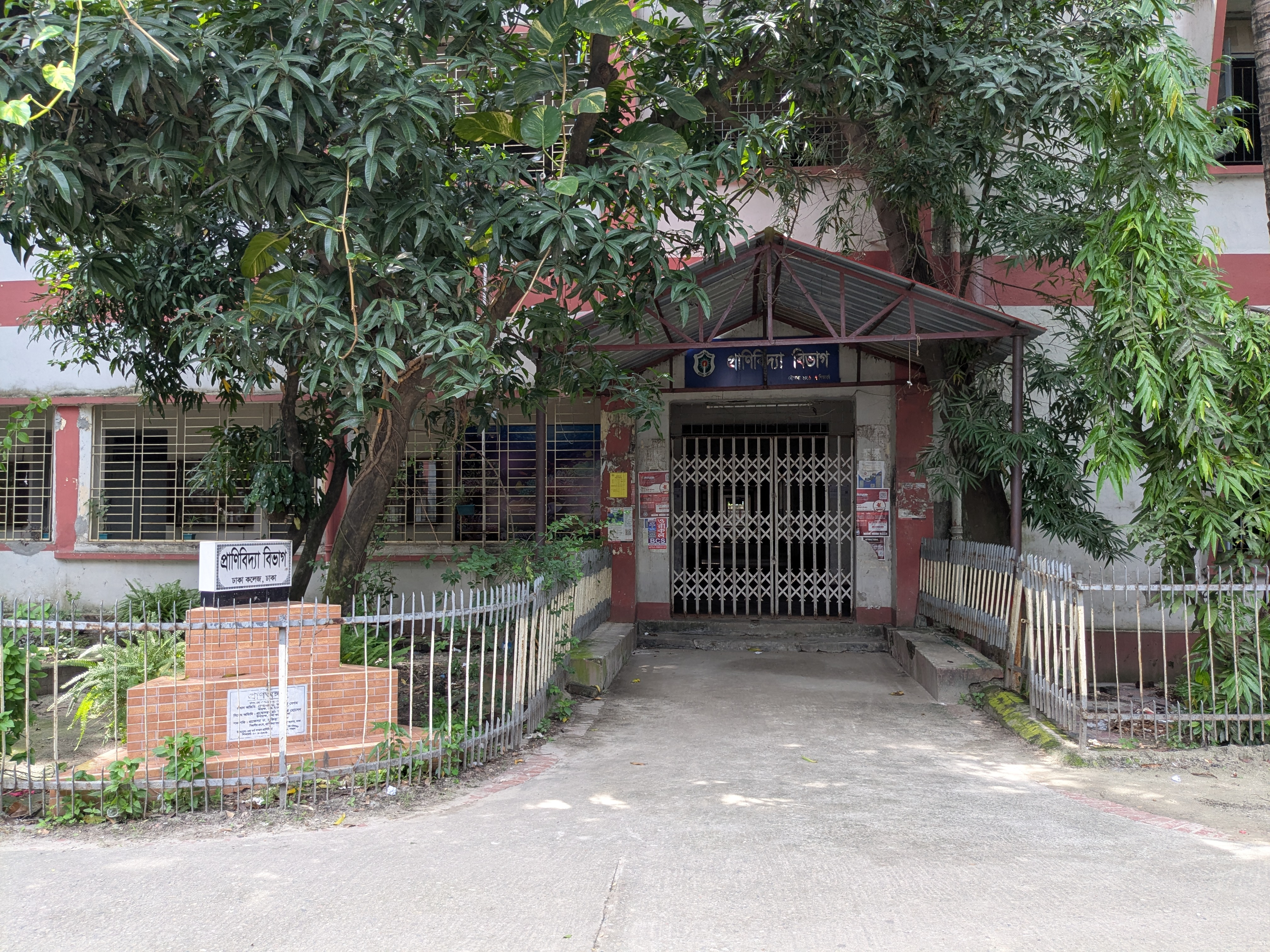
Department of Zoology in the Mul Bhaban (Main Academic Building), Dhaka College Campus, Dhaka Central University.

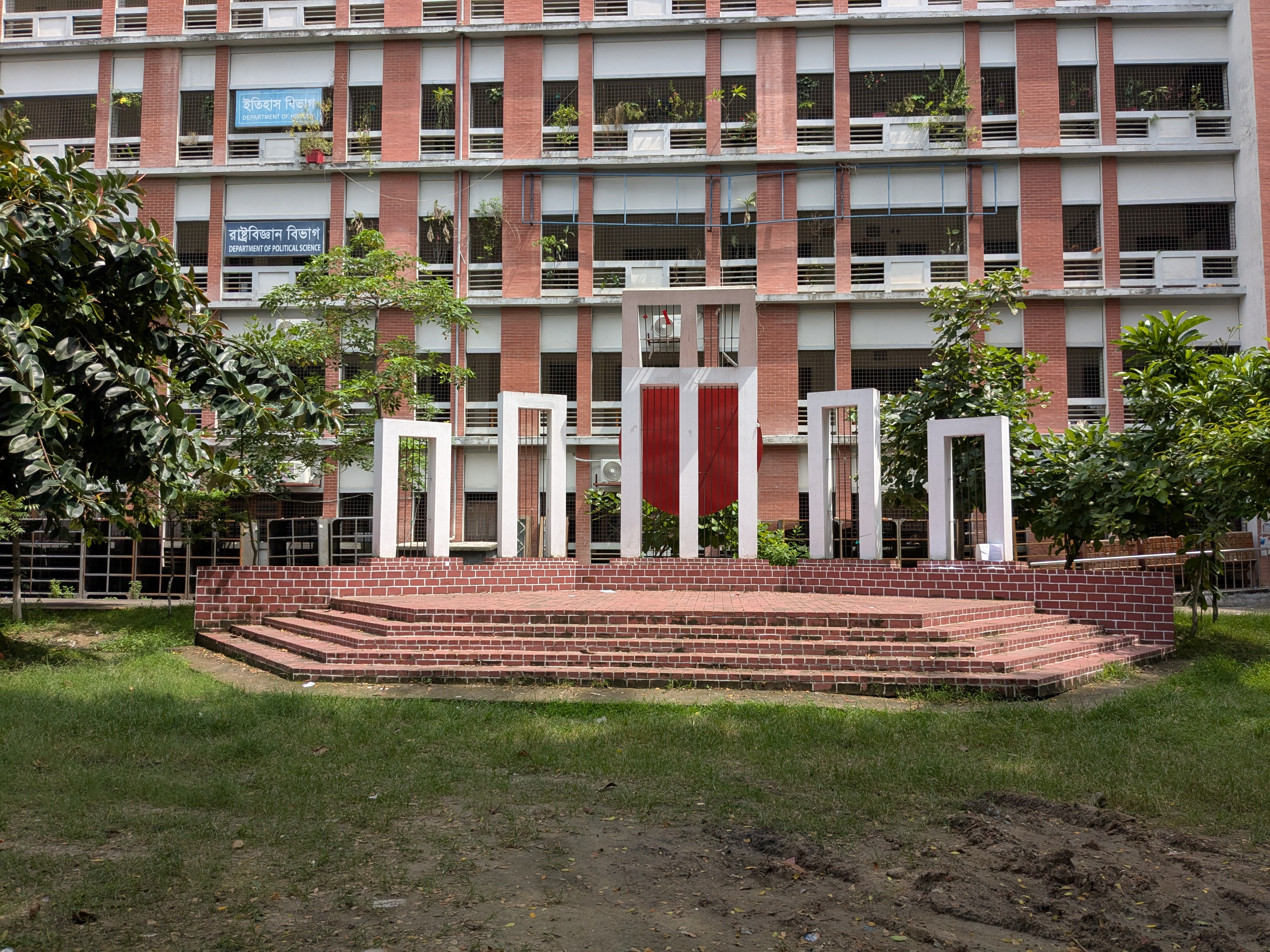
Shaheed Minar at the Dhaka College Campus of Dhaka Central University.

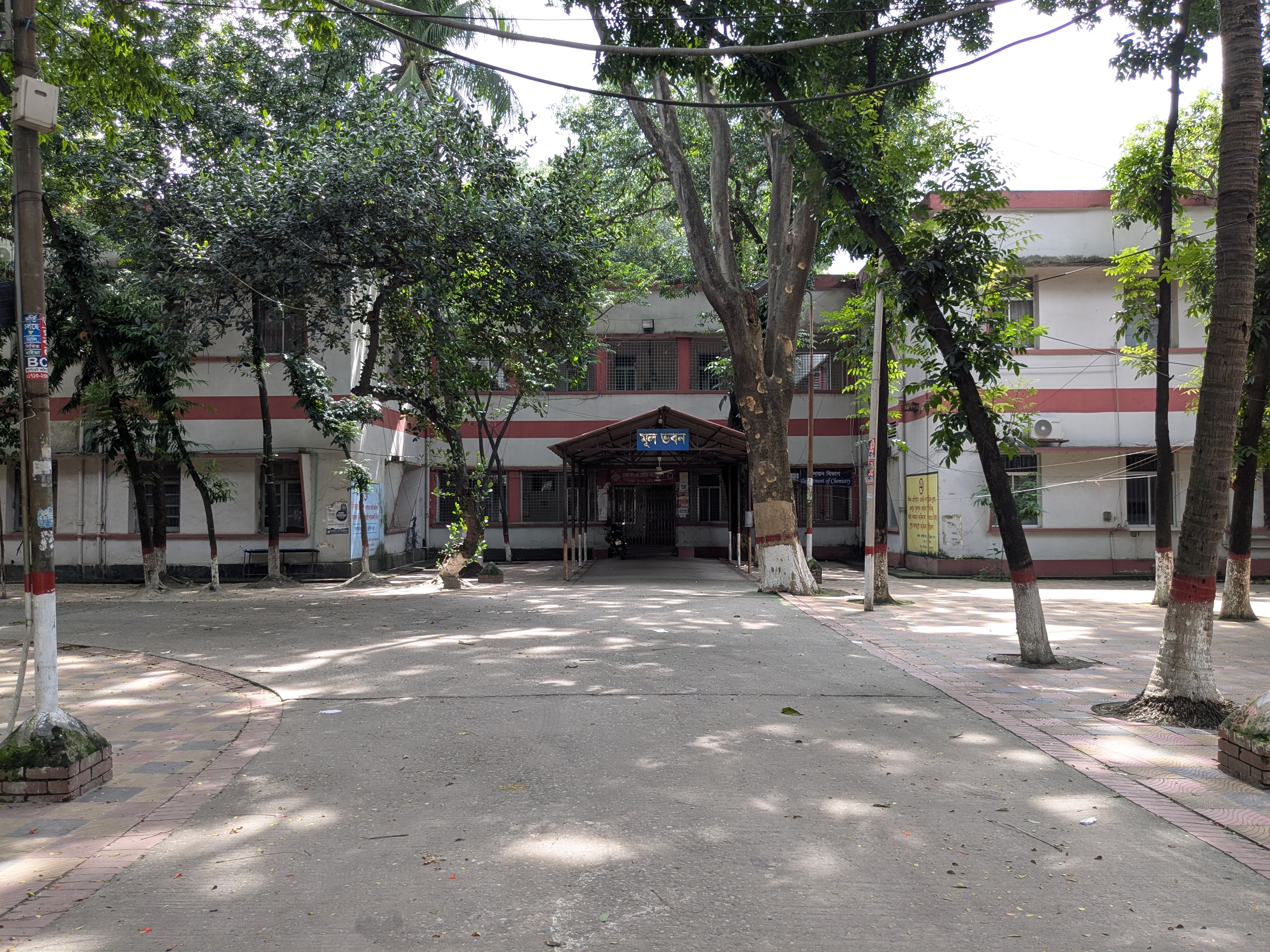
Mul Bhaban (Main Academic Building) of the Dhaka College Campus of Dhaka Central University.

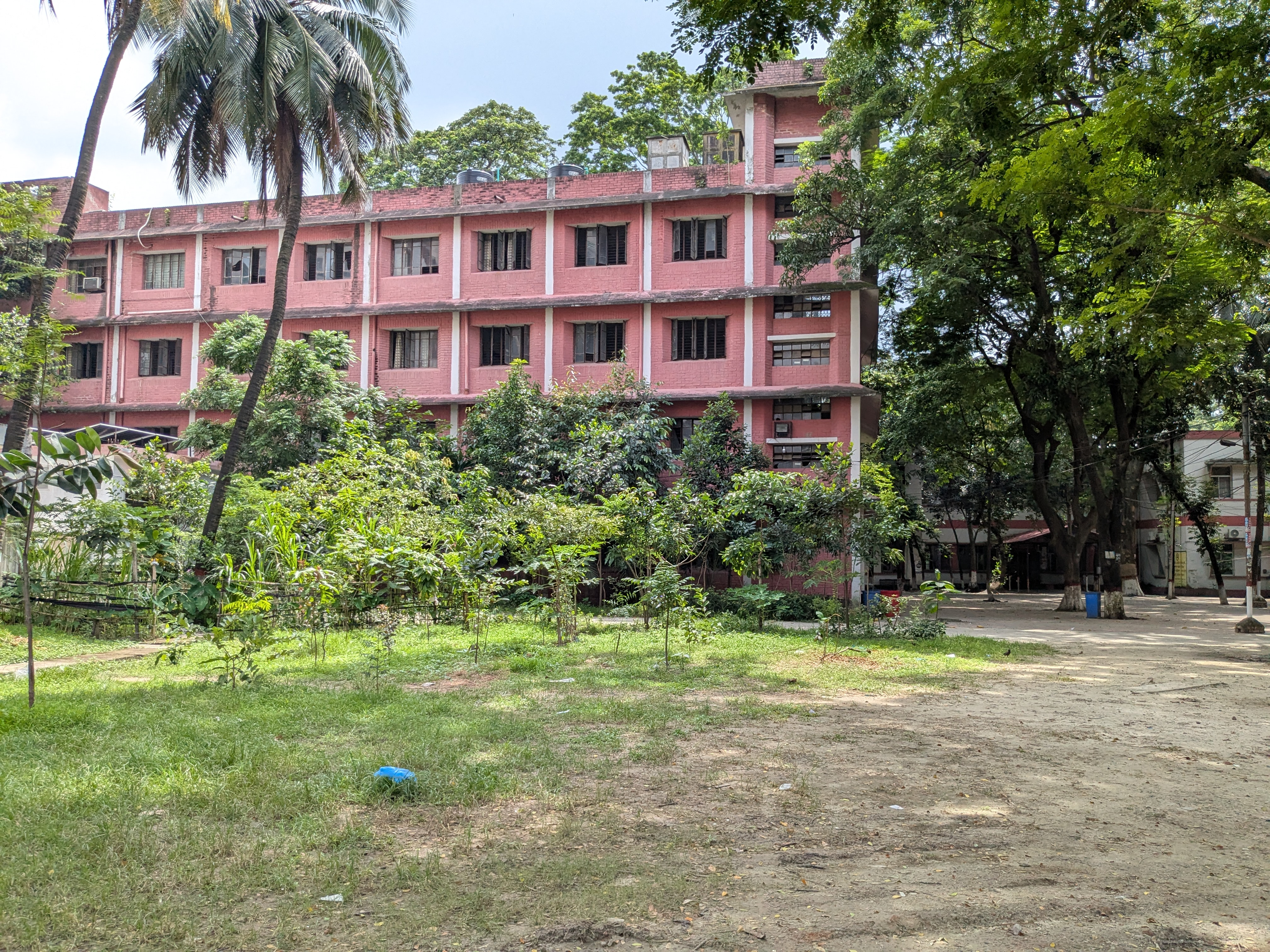
Building of the Departments of Botany and Philosophy at the Dhaka College Campus of Dhaka Central University.

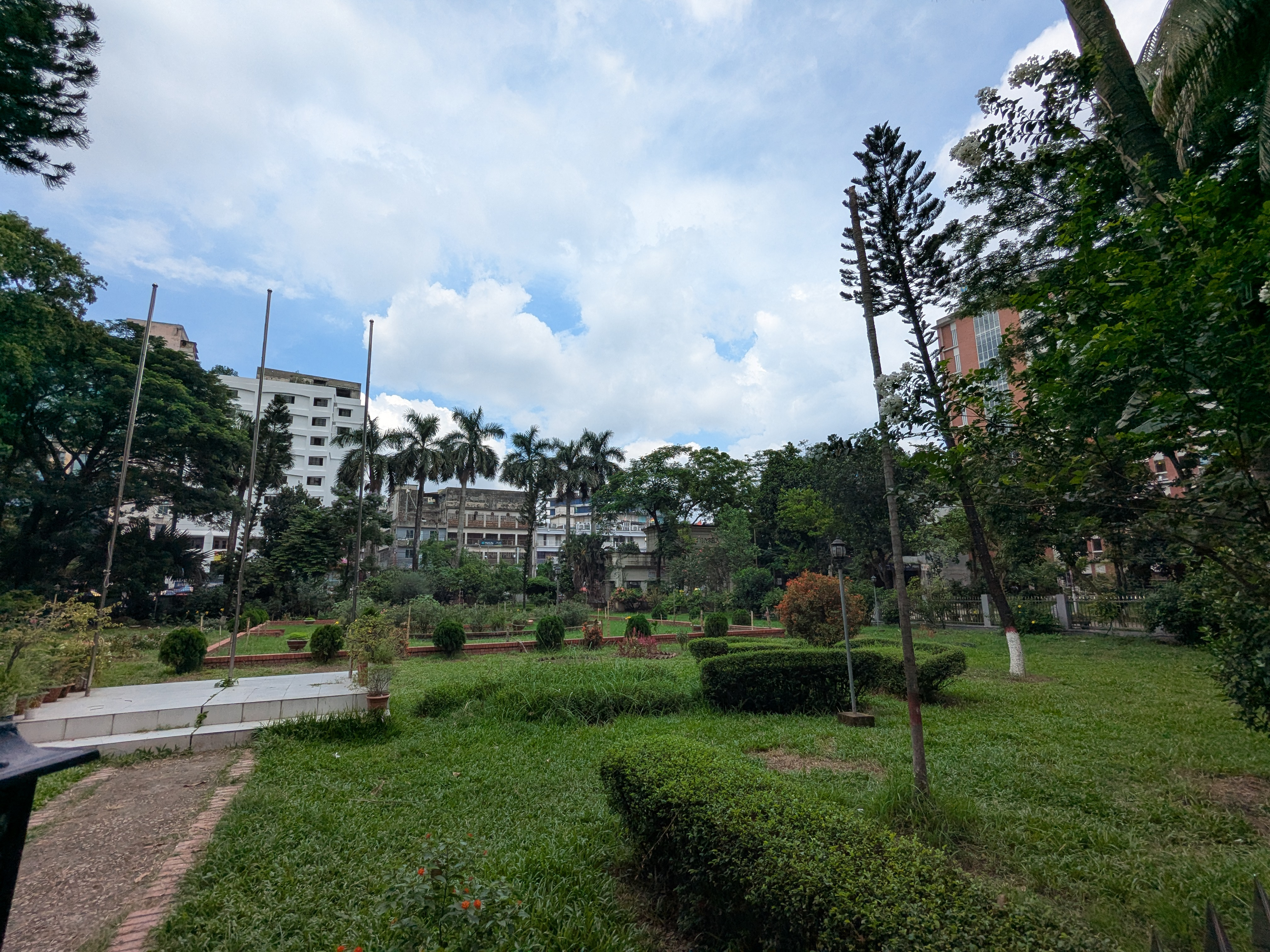
Flag stand at the Dhaka College Campus of Dhaka Central University.

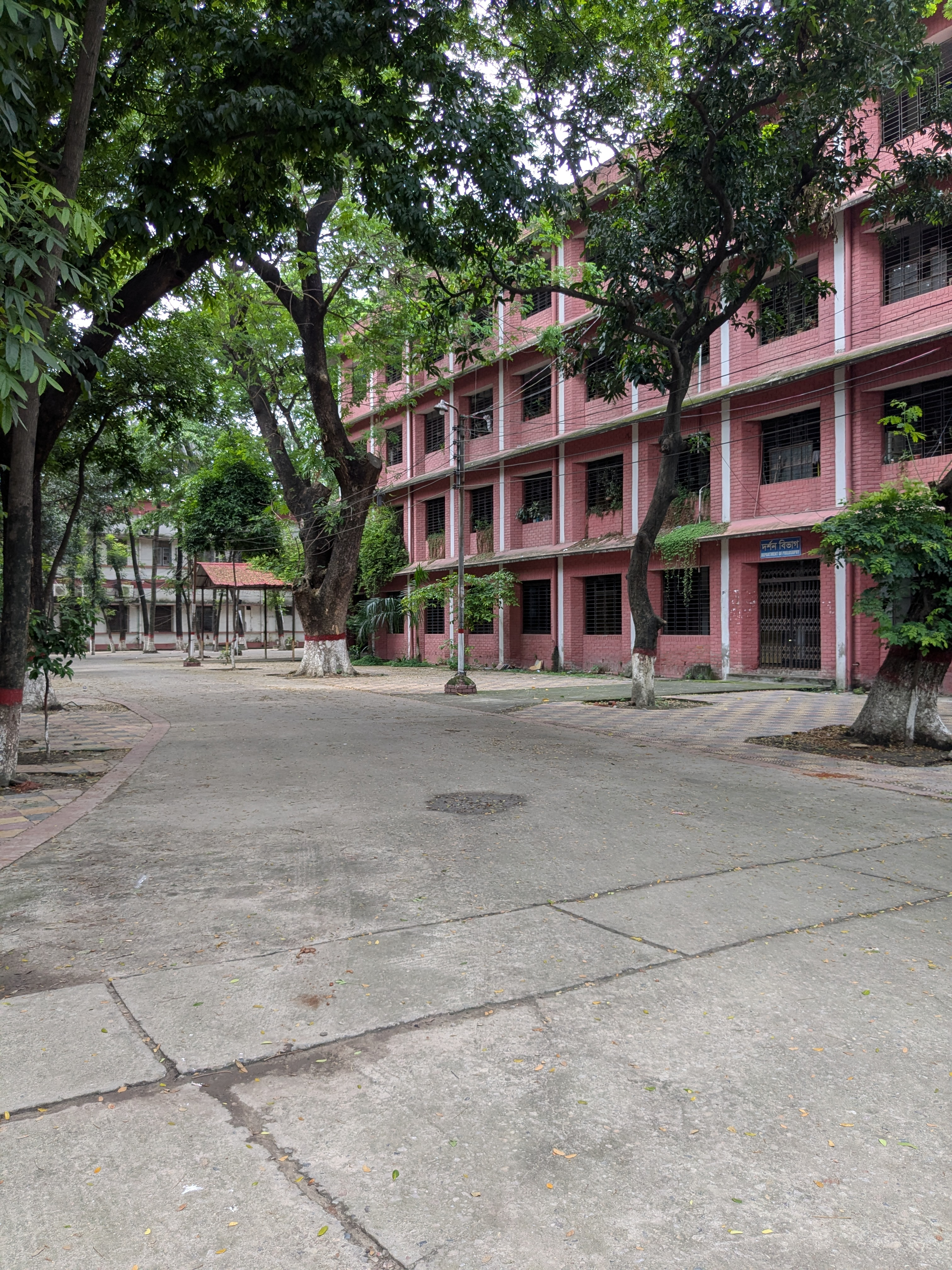
July Square at the Dhaka College Campus of Dhaka Central University.

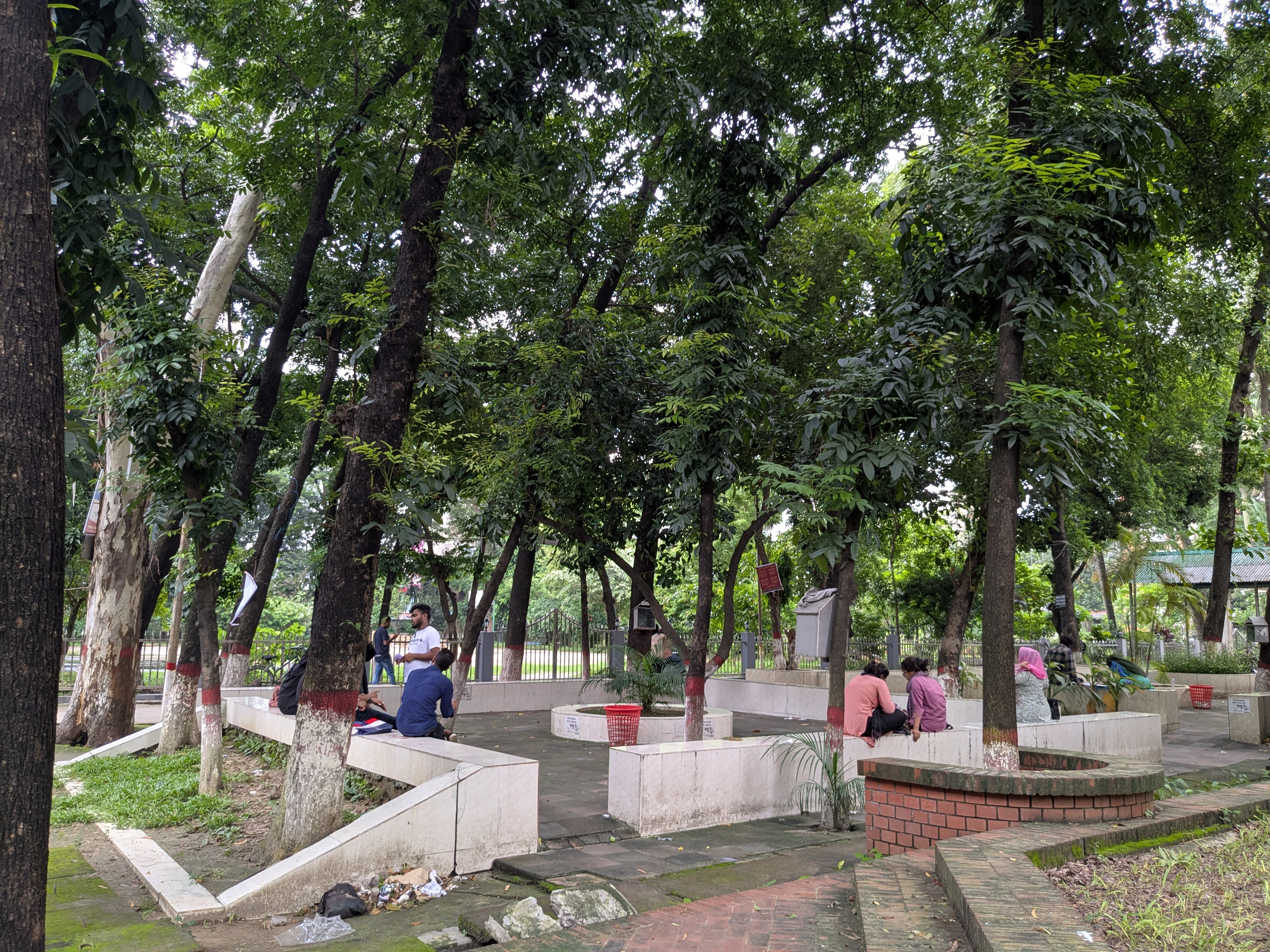
Bijoy Chattar at the Dhaka College Campus of Dhaka Central University.

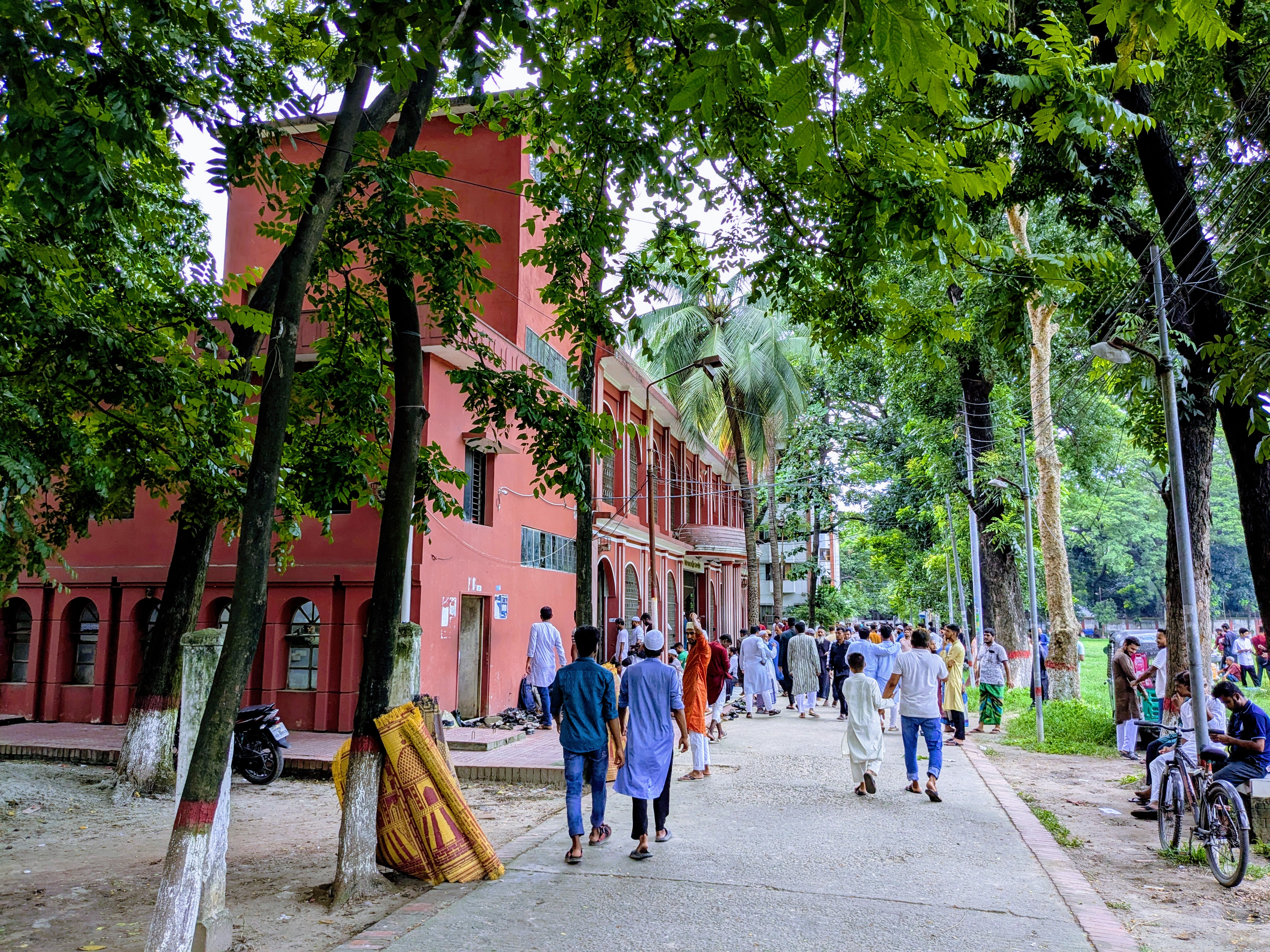
Central Mosque of the Dhaka College Campus of Dhaka Central University.

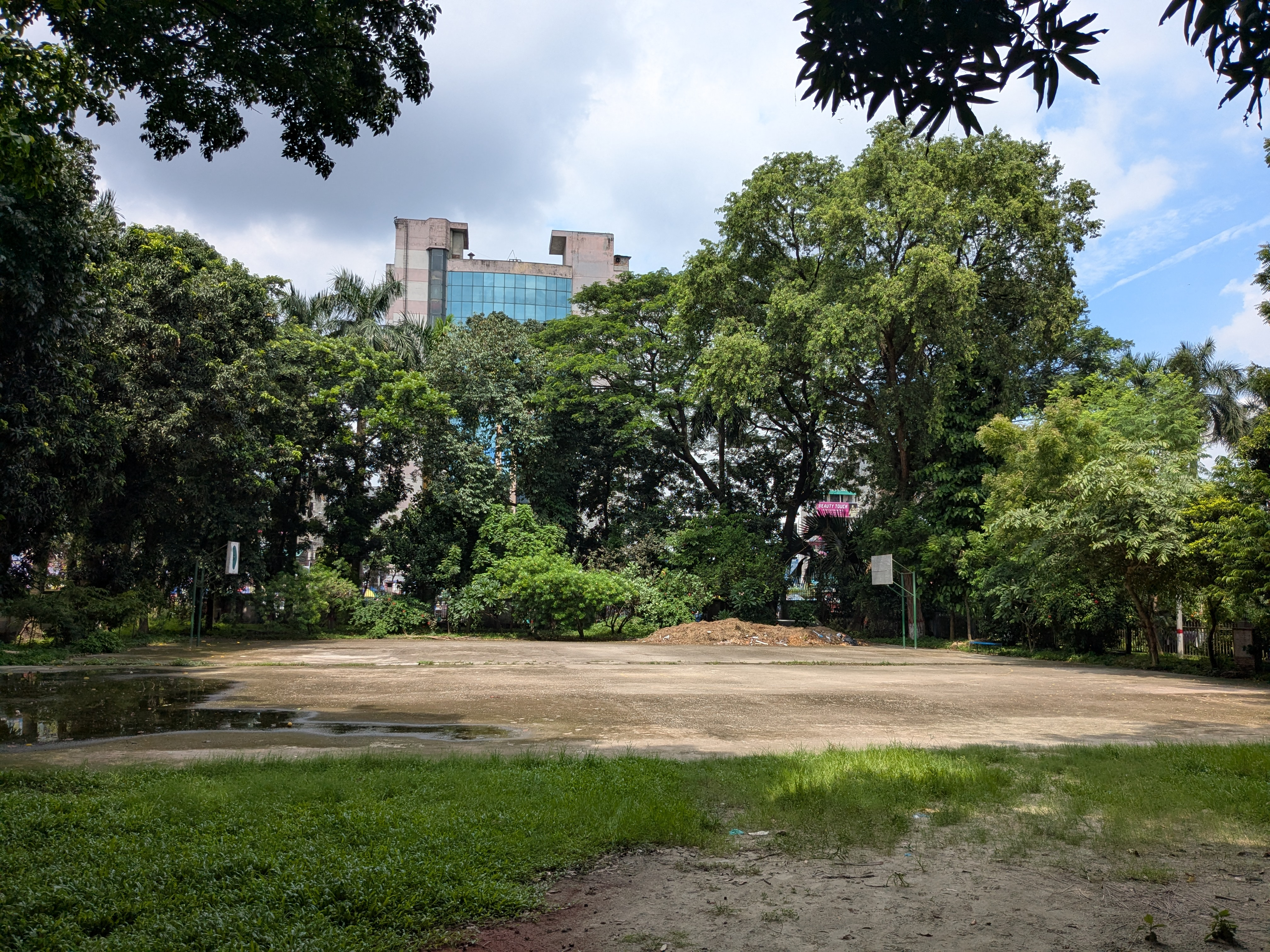
Tennis court at the Dhaka College Campus of Dhaka Central University.

Eden Campus

Main entrance of Dhaka Central University (Eden Campus).

Joyita-71 sculpture at Dhaka Central University (Eden Campus).

Academic cum Examination Building of Dhaka Central University (Eden Campus).

Academic Building of Dhaka Central University (Eden Campus).

Building 5 of Dhaka Central University (Eden Campus).

Shed corridor at Dhaka Central University (Eden Campus).

Post box at Dhaka Central University (Eden Campus).

BNCC Building at Dhaka Central University (Eden Campus).

Library building of Dhaka Central University (Eden Campus).

Basketball court at Dhaka Central University (Eden Campus).

Basketball court 2 at Dhaka Central University (Eden Campus).

A gulmohar tree at Dhaka Central University (Eden Campus).

Pondside and Bangamata Sheikh Fazilatunnesa Mujib Hall at Dhaka Central University (Eden Campus).

Area surrounding the pond and playground at Dhaka Central University (Eden Campus).

Walkway beside the pond at Dhaka Central University (Eden Campus).

Main Gate 1 of Hazrat Aisha Siddika (RA) Female Students' Hostel at Dhaka Central University (Eden Campus).

Main Gate 2 of Hazrat Aisha Siddika (RA) Female Students' Hostel at Dhaka Central University (Eden Campus).

Shaheed Minar at Dhaka Central University (Eden Campus).

Government ambulance at Dhaka Central University (Eden Campus).

Corridor of the Department of History at Dhaka Central University (Eden Campus).

Corridor 1 of the Academic Building at Dhaka Central University (Eden Campus).

Corridor 2 of the Academic Building at Dhaka Central University (Eden Campus).

Zebunnesa Female Students' Hall at Dhaka Central University (Eden Campus).

Interior of Zebunnesa Female Students' Hall at Dhaka Central University (Eden Campus).

Building 2 and the flagstand at Dhaka Central University (Eden Campus).

Pillar of the Quest for Knowledge at Dhaka Central University (Eden Campus).

Motto pillar at Dhaka Central University (Eden Campus).

Mural in the vicinity of Dhaka Central University (Eden Campus).

Mural on the outer boundary wall adjacent to Dhaka Central University (Eden Campus).

Hazrat Rabia Basri (RA) Female Students' Hall at Dhaka Central University (Eden Campus).

An old abandoned bus at Dhaka Central University (Eden Campus).

Titumir campus

The administrative building and the new science building of Dhaka Central University (Titumir Campus).

Shaheed Barkat Auditorium of Dhaka Central University (Titumir Campus).

Dhaka Central University (gate exit of Titumir Campus).

Dhaka Central University (Titumir Campus) Inner Gate.

Bishwakabi Bhaban of Dhaka Central University (Titumir Campus).

Dhaka Central University (Titumir Campus) Arts Building.

Dhaka Central University (Titumir Campus)–Pallikabi Bhaban.

Dhaka Central University (Titumir Campus)–Bidrohi Kabi Bhaban.

Dhaka Central University (Titumir Campus) Students' Union and Department of Physical Education Building.

The facade of the Jama Masjid, Dhaka Central University (Titumir Campus).

Dhaka Central University (Titumir Campus) Jame Mosque.

Inside the Bishwakabi Bhaban of Dhaka Central University (Titumir Campus).

Dhaka Central University (Titumir Campus) the Poets of Love and Rebellion Rabindra-Nazrul Mancha.

Dhaka Central University (Titumir Campus) Shaheed Minar.

Dhaka Central University (Titumir Campus) Open Stage.

Dhaka Central University (Titumir Campus), Old Science Building.

Department of Psychology, Dhaka Central University (Titumir Campus).

Dhaka Central University (Titumir Campus), Departments of Chemistry and Zoology, Old Science Building.

Interior of the Old Science Building at Dhaka Central University (Titumir Campus).

Dhaka Central University (Titumir Campus) Library.

Dhaka Central University (Titumir Campus) Primary Healthcare, Mental Health Center, and Rover Scout Center.

Dhaka Central University (Titumir College Campus) Botanical Garden.

Dhaka Central University (Titumir Campus), Koraitola.

Dhaka Central University (Titumir Campus) Staff Accommodation.

Dhaka Central University (Titumir Campus) Flag Stand.

Dhaka Central University (Titumir Campus) Playground.

Student Hall gate of Dhaka Central University (Titumir Campus).

Dhaka Central University (Titumir Campus) Shaheed Mamun Hall.

Dhaka Central University (Titumir Campus)–Akkachur Rahman Akhi Hall.

Dhaka Central University (Titumir Campus) Female Students' Hall Gate.

Dhaka Central University (Titumir Campus) Aparajita Female Students' Hall.

Dhaka Central University (Titumir Campus) Sufia Kamal Female Students' Hall.

Siraj Female Students' Hall of Dhaka Central University (Titumir Campus).

Dhaka Central University (Titumir Campus) Bansherkella Cafeteria.

Dhaka Central University (Titumir Campus) Badhon Office.

Dhaka Central University (Titumir Campus) skyline.

The "Samparka" bus of Dhaka Central University (Titumir Campus).

Dhaka Central University (Titumir Campus) Bus Garage.

Bangla College campus

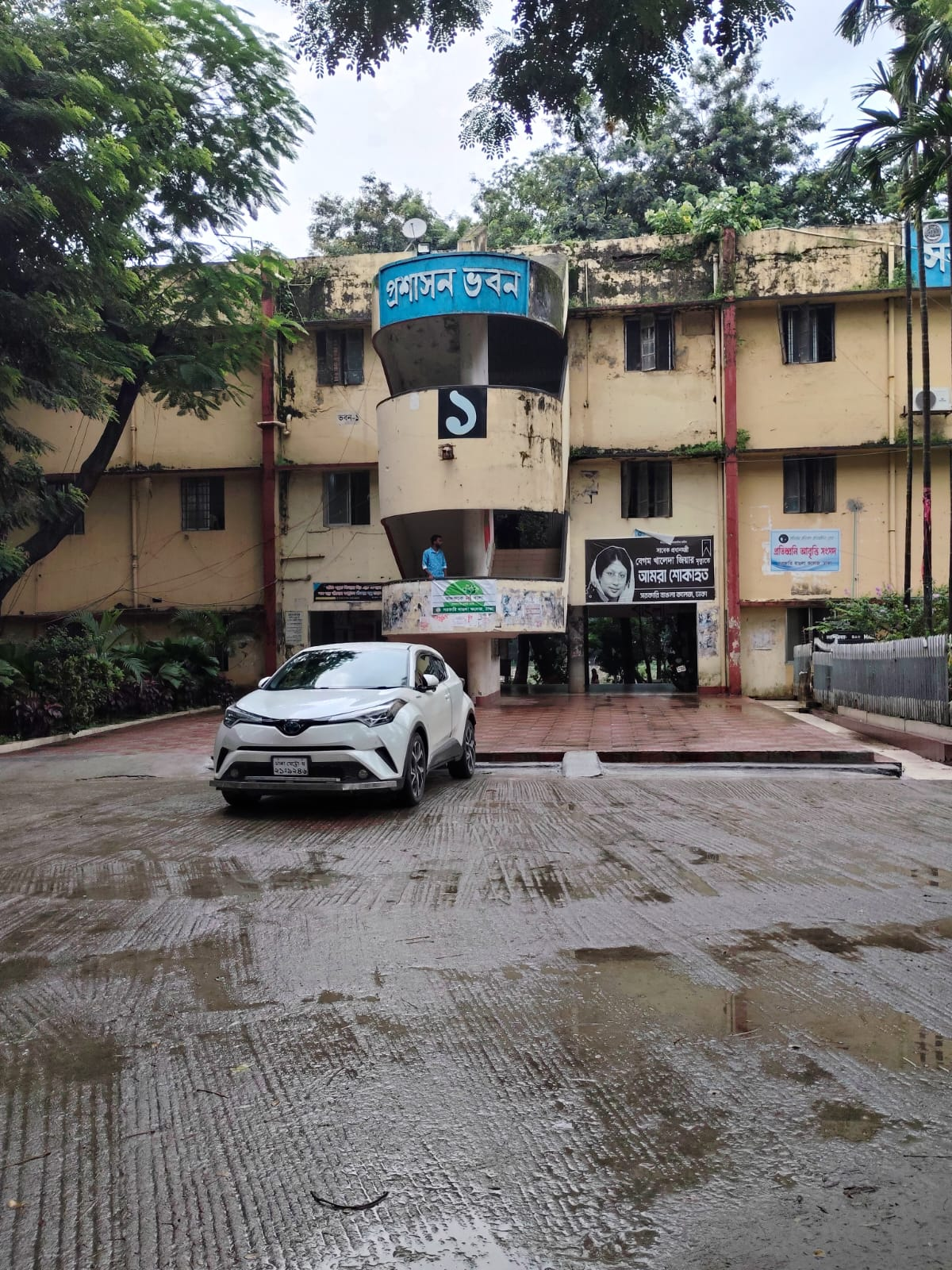
The facade of Dhaka Central University (Bangla College Campus) Administrative Building-1.

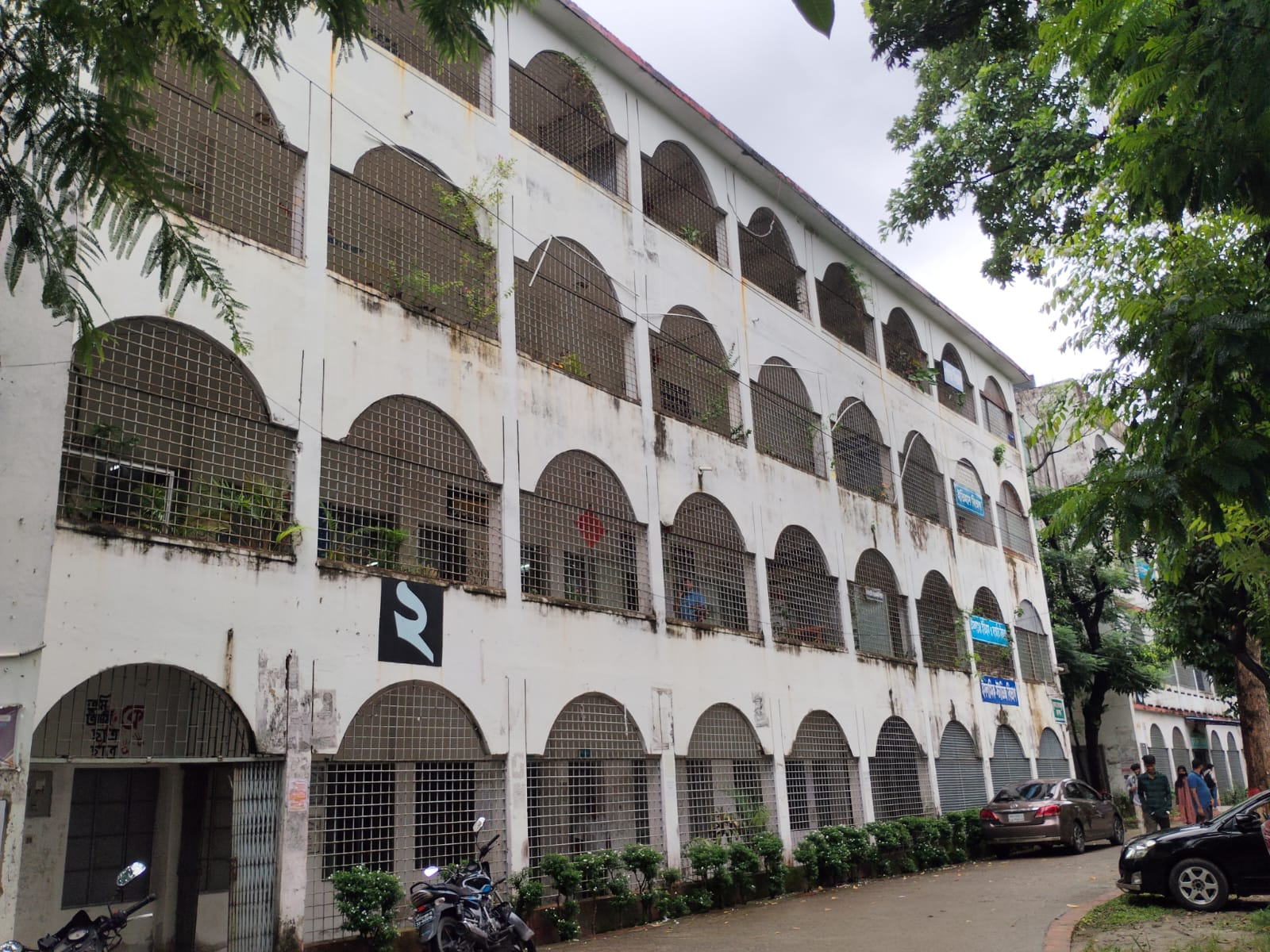
Dhaka Central University (Bangla College Campus) Academic Building-2.

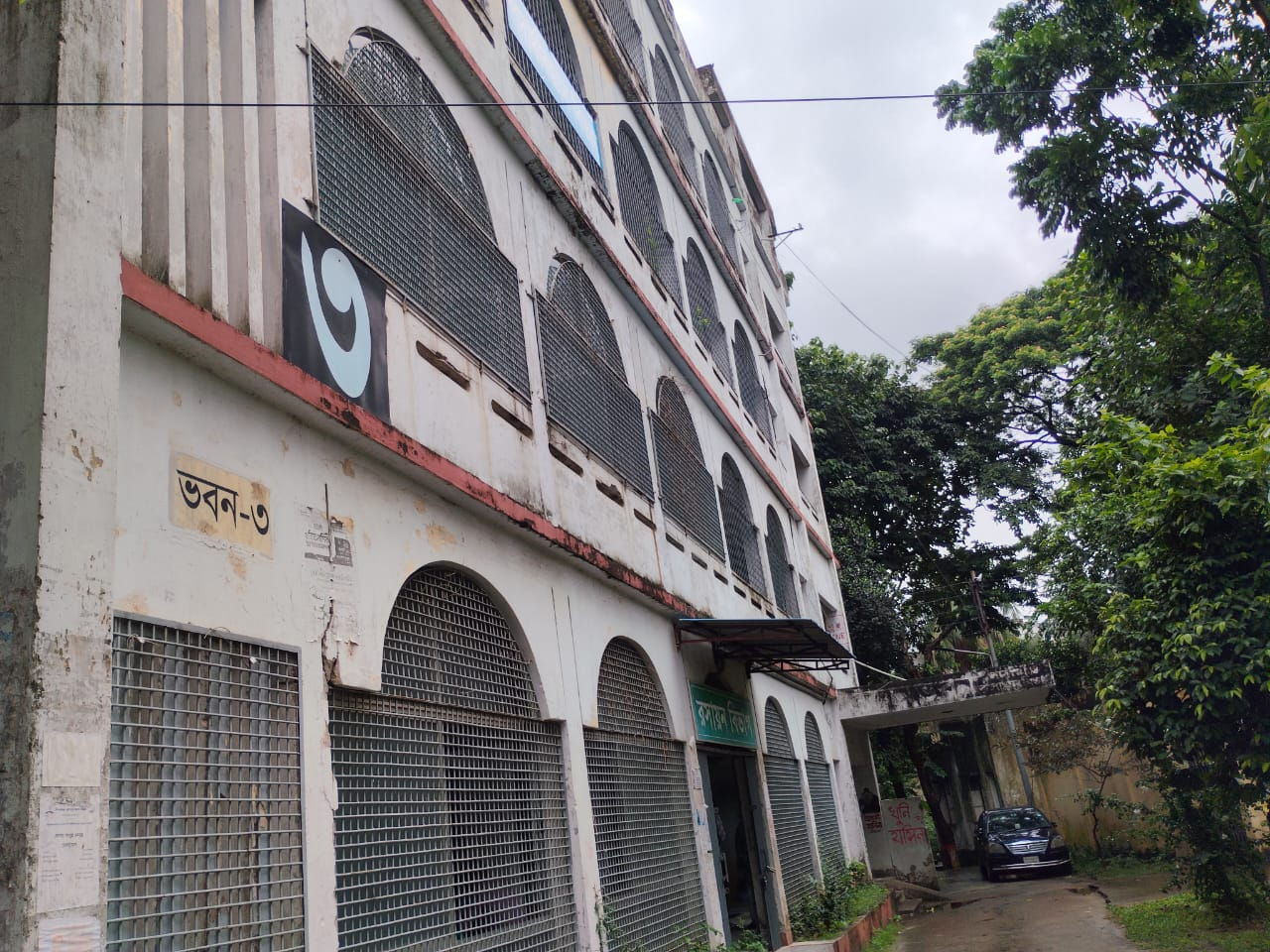
Dhaka Central University (Bangla College Campus) Academic Building-3.

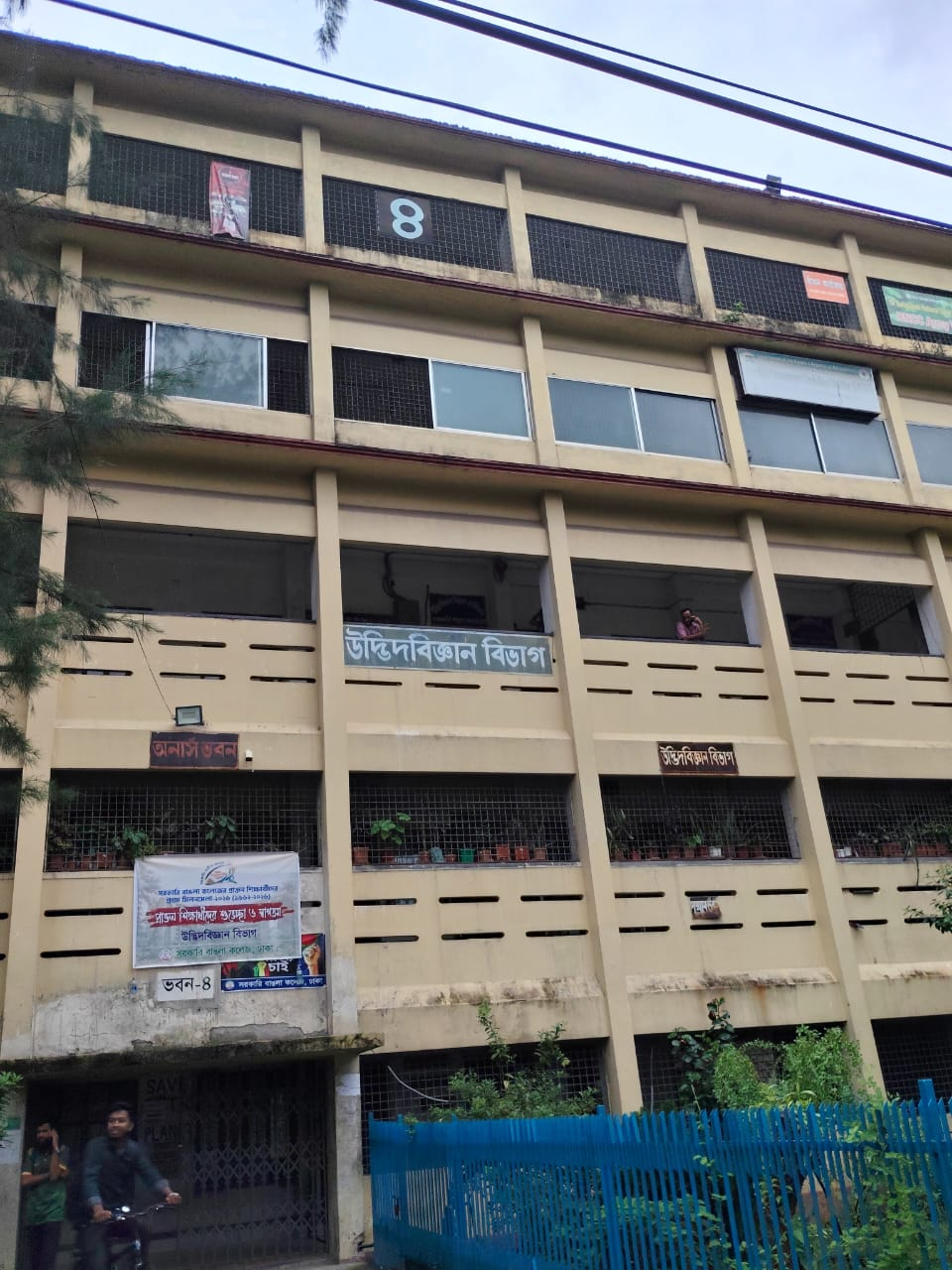
The main gate of the Department of Botany (Building No. 4) of Dhaka Central University (Bangla College Campus).

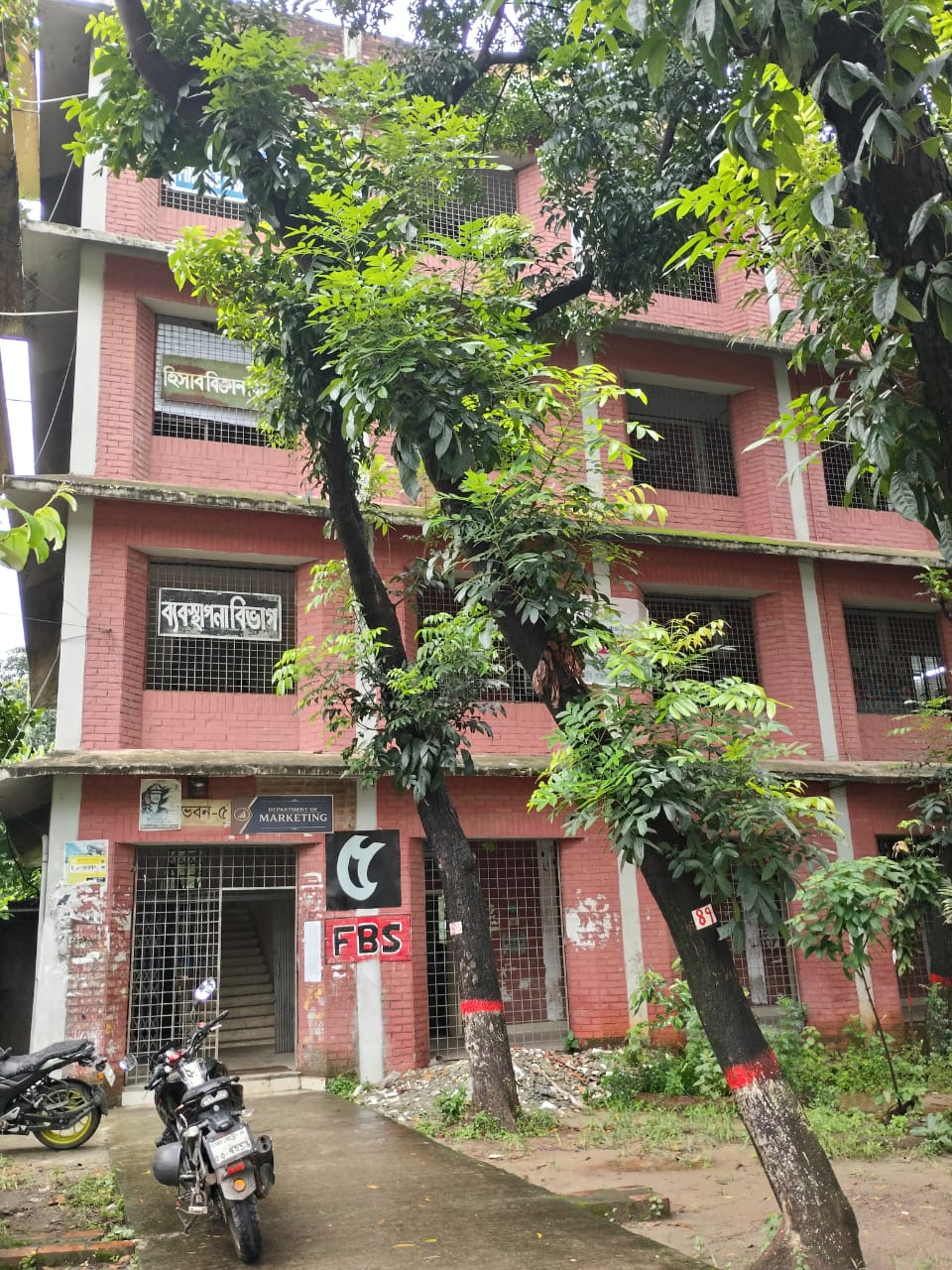
Dhaka Central University (Bangla College Campus) Academic Building-5.

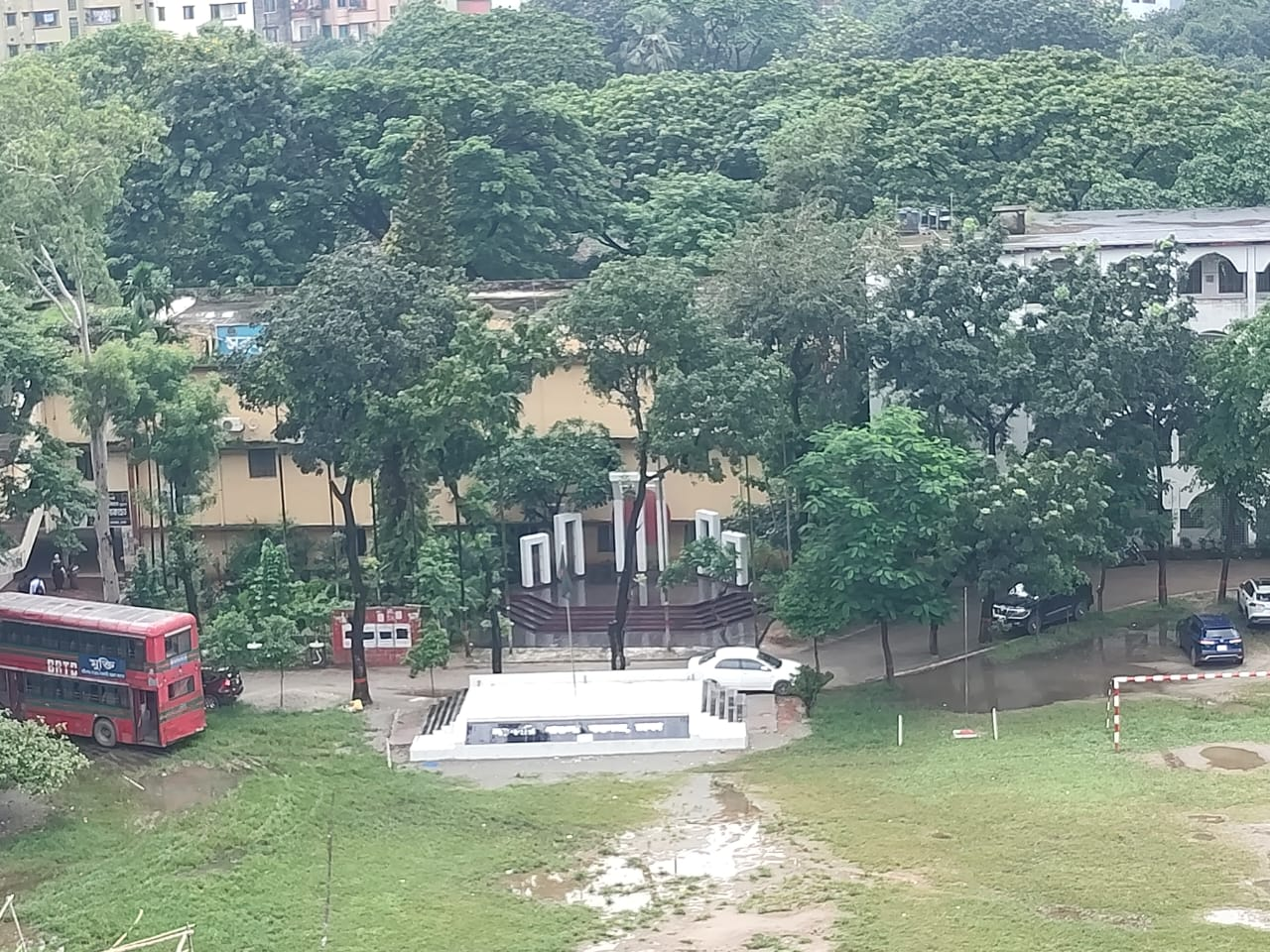
Shaheed Minar of Dhaka Central University (Bangla College Campus).

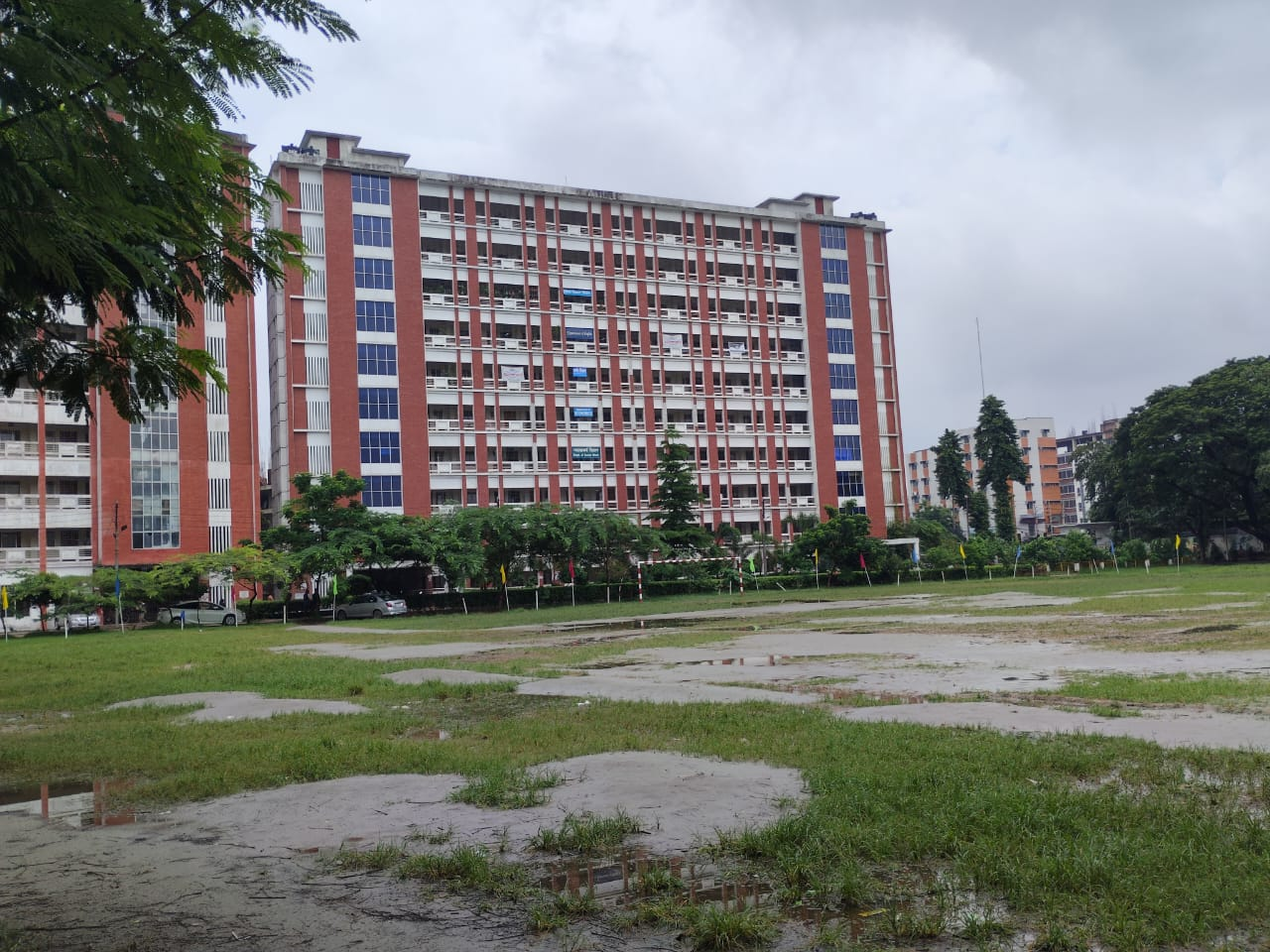
View of Academic Building-8 from Central Field, Dhaka Central University (Bangla College Campus).

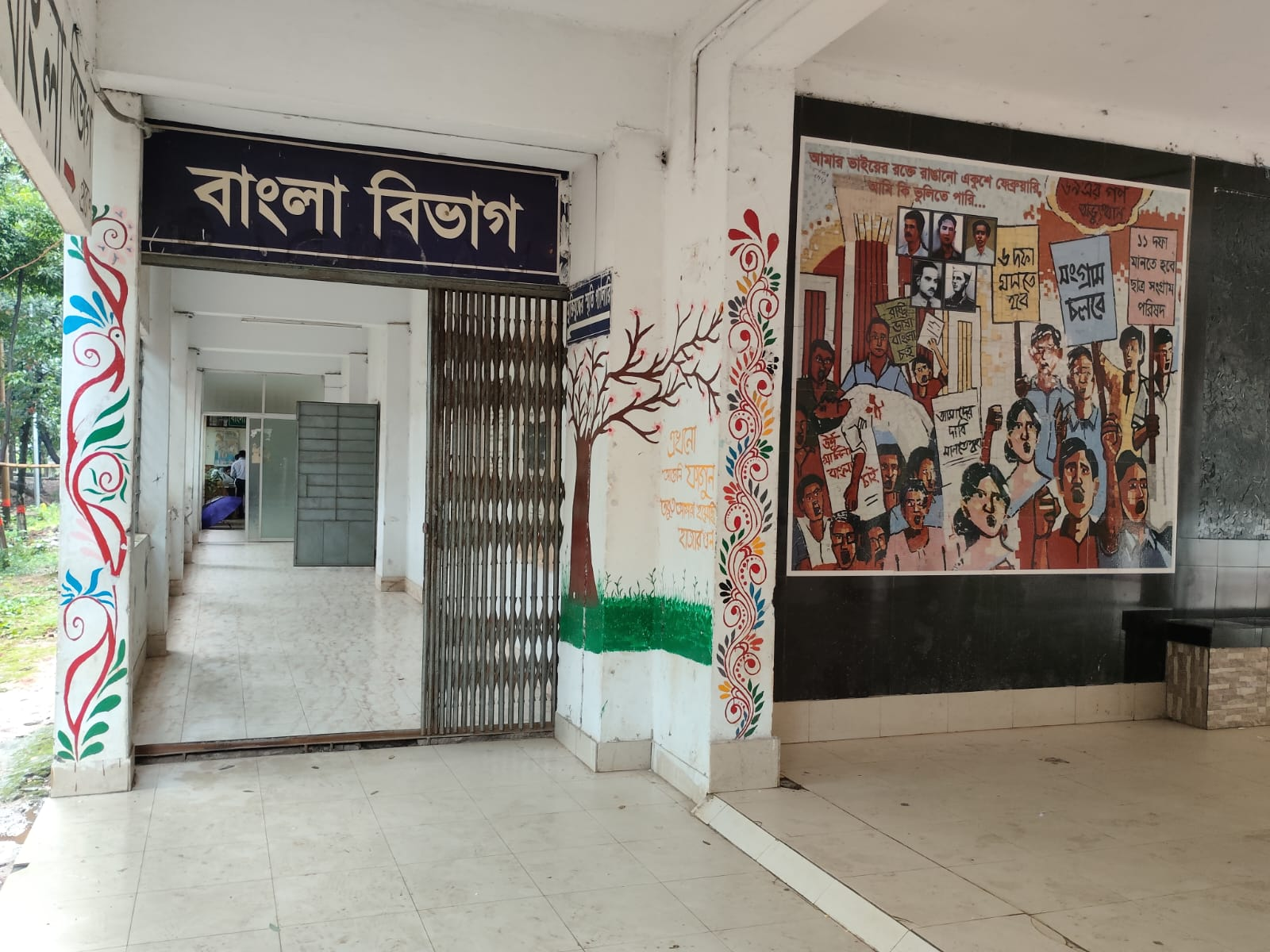
Bangla Department of Dhaka Central University (Bangla College Campus).

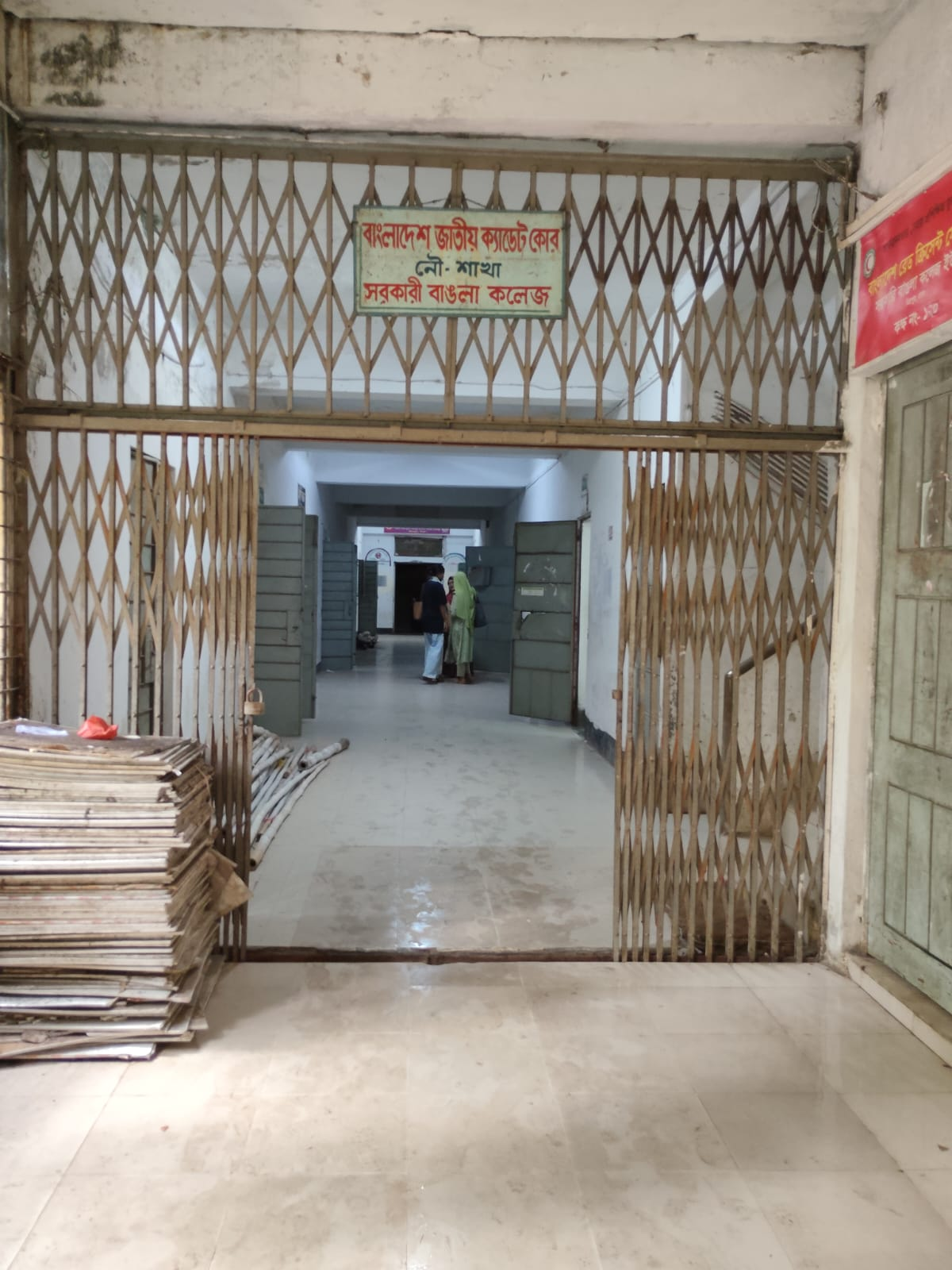
BNCC building of Dhaka Central University (Bangla College Campus).

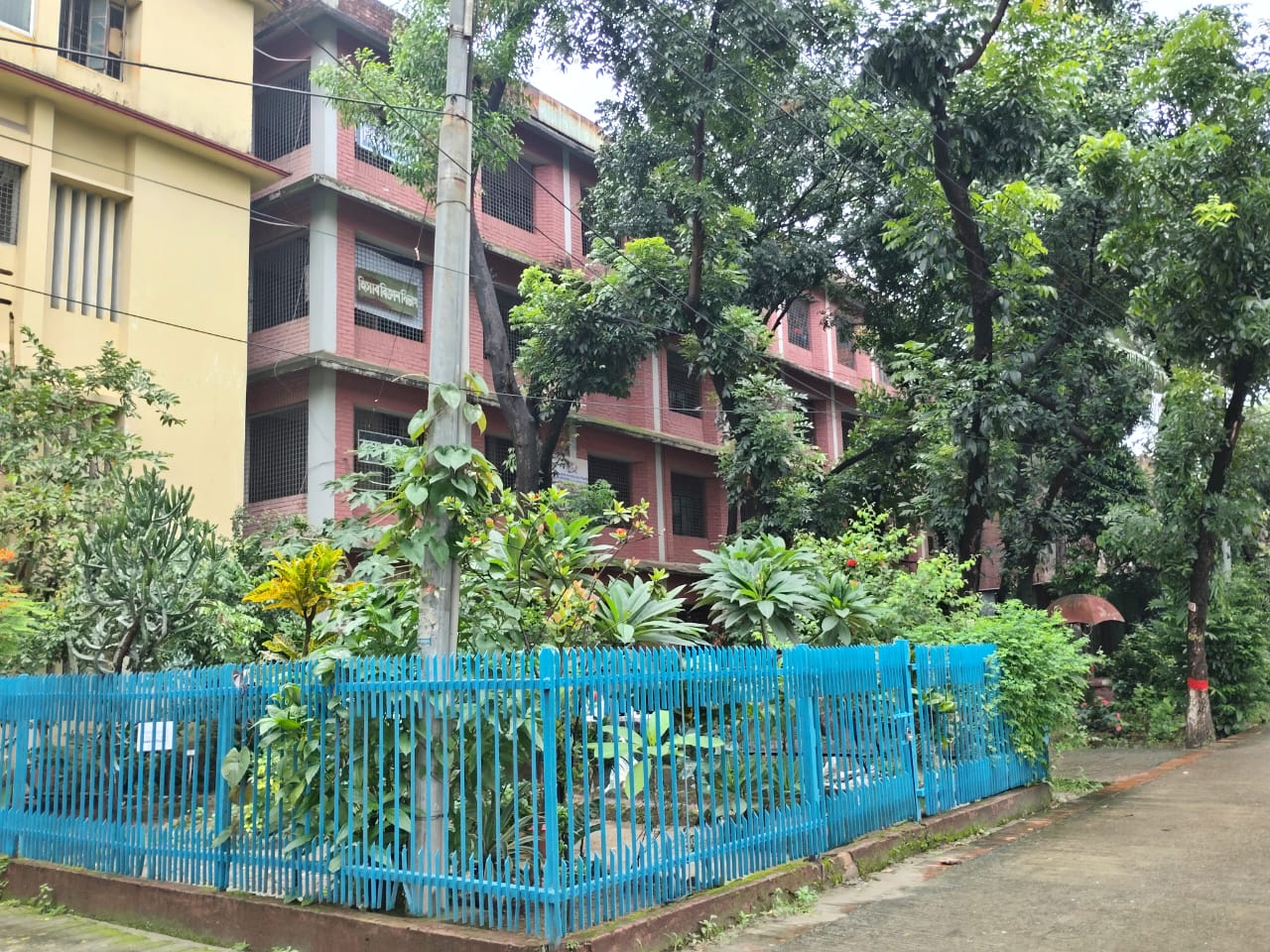
Department of Botany, Dhaka Central University (Bangla College Campus).

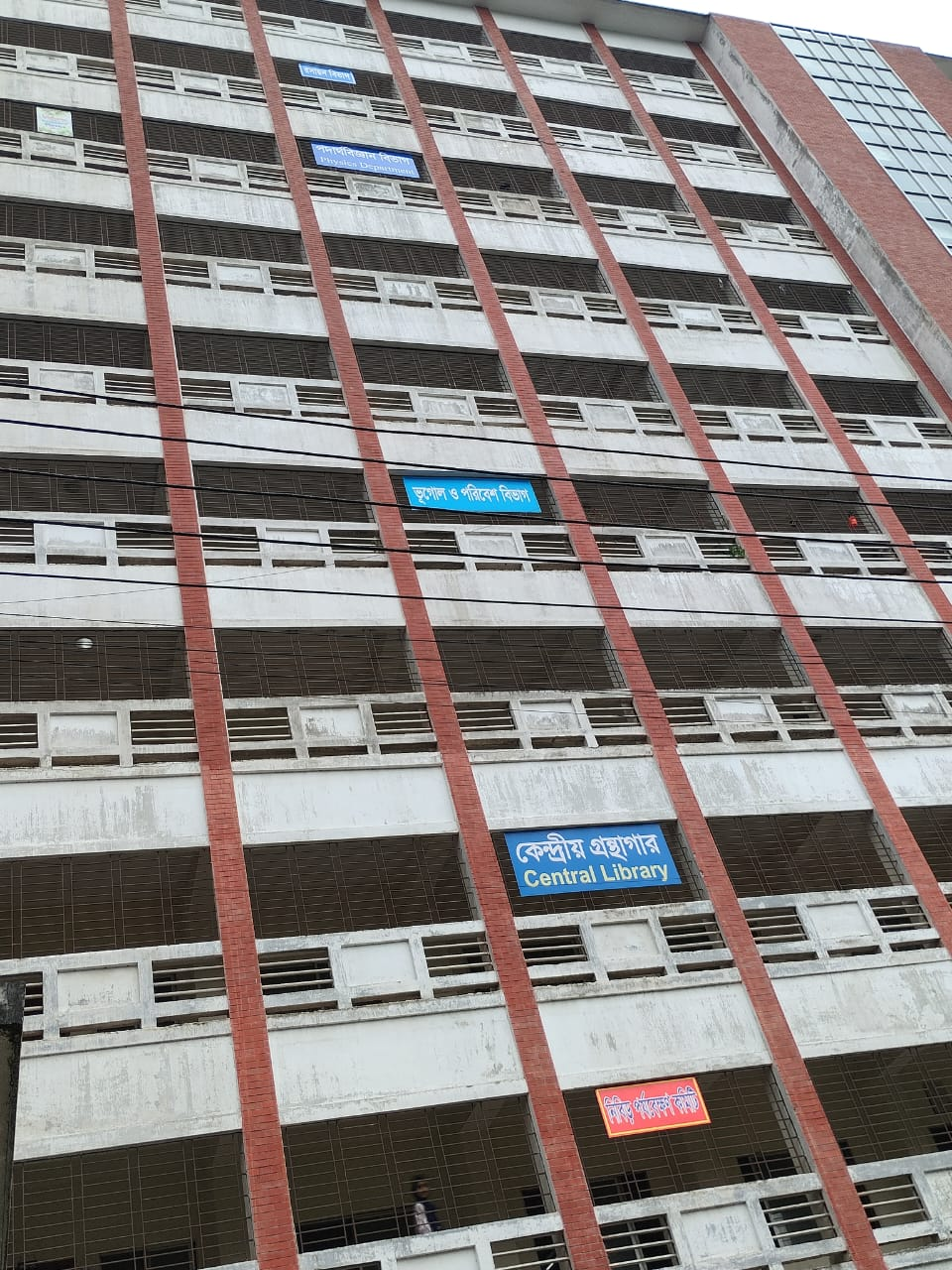
Dhaka Central University (Bangla College Campus) Library.

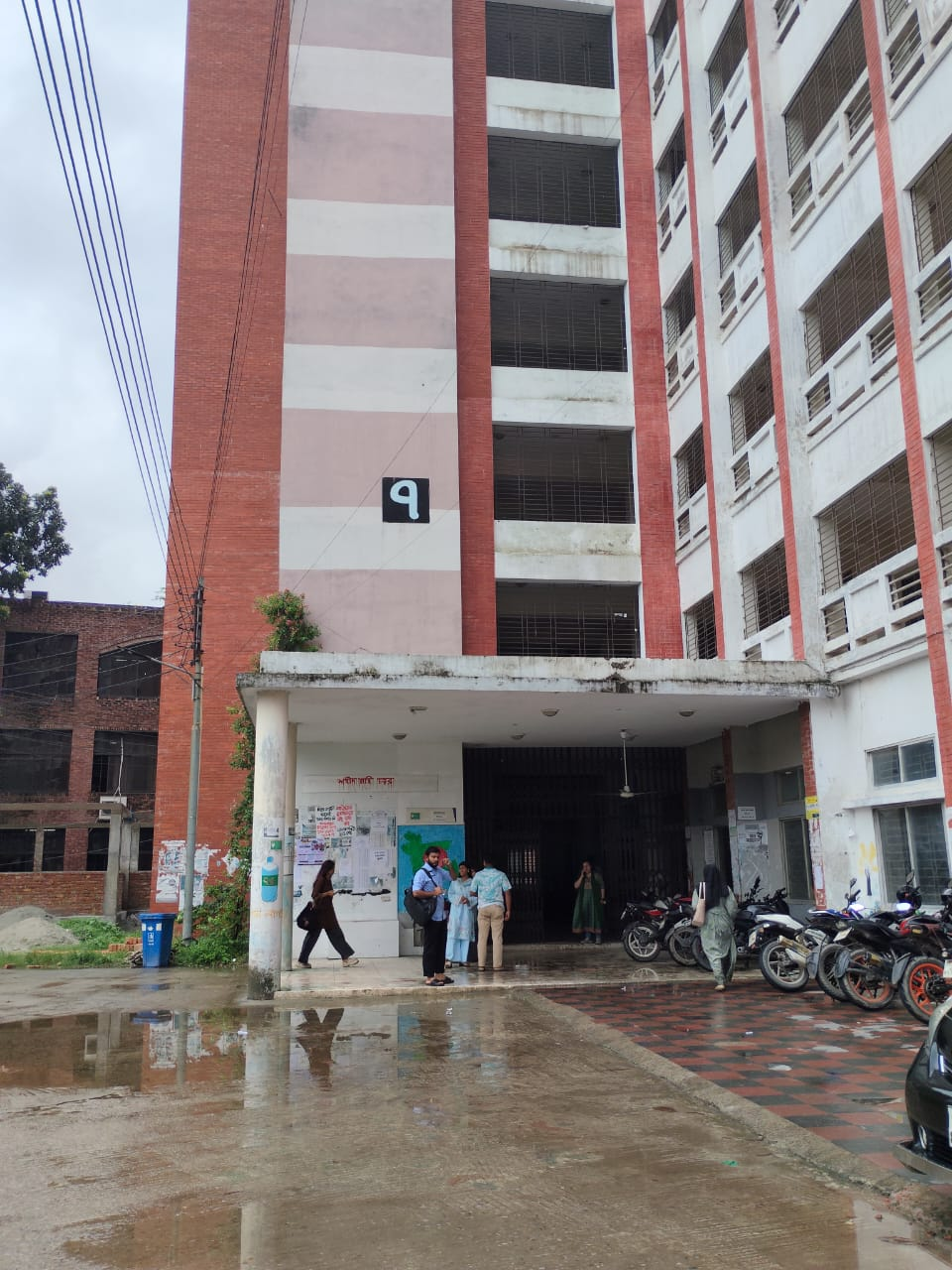
Dhaka Central University (Bangla College Campus) Academic Building-7 Entrance.

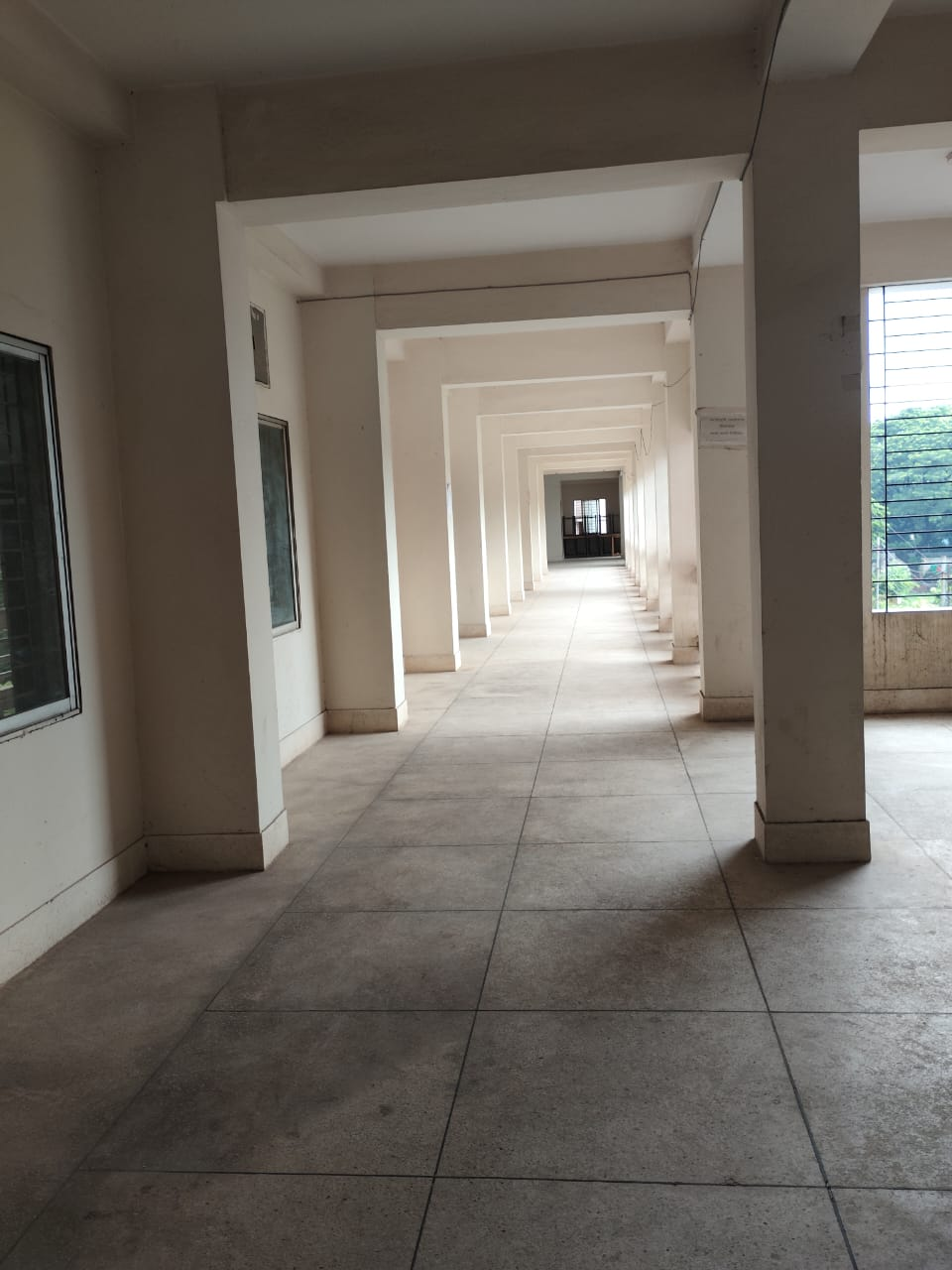
Dhaka Central University (Bangla College Campus) Academic Building-8's internal infrastructure.

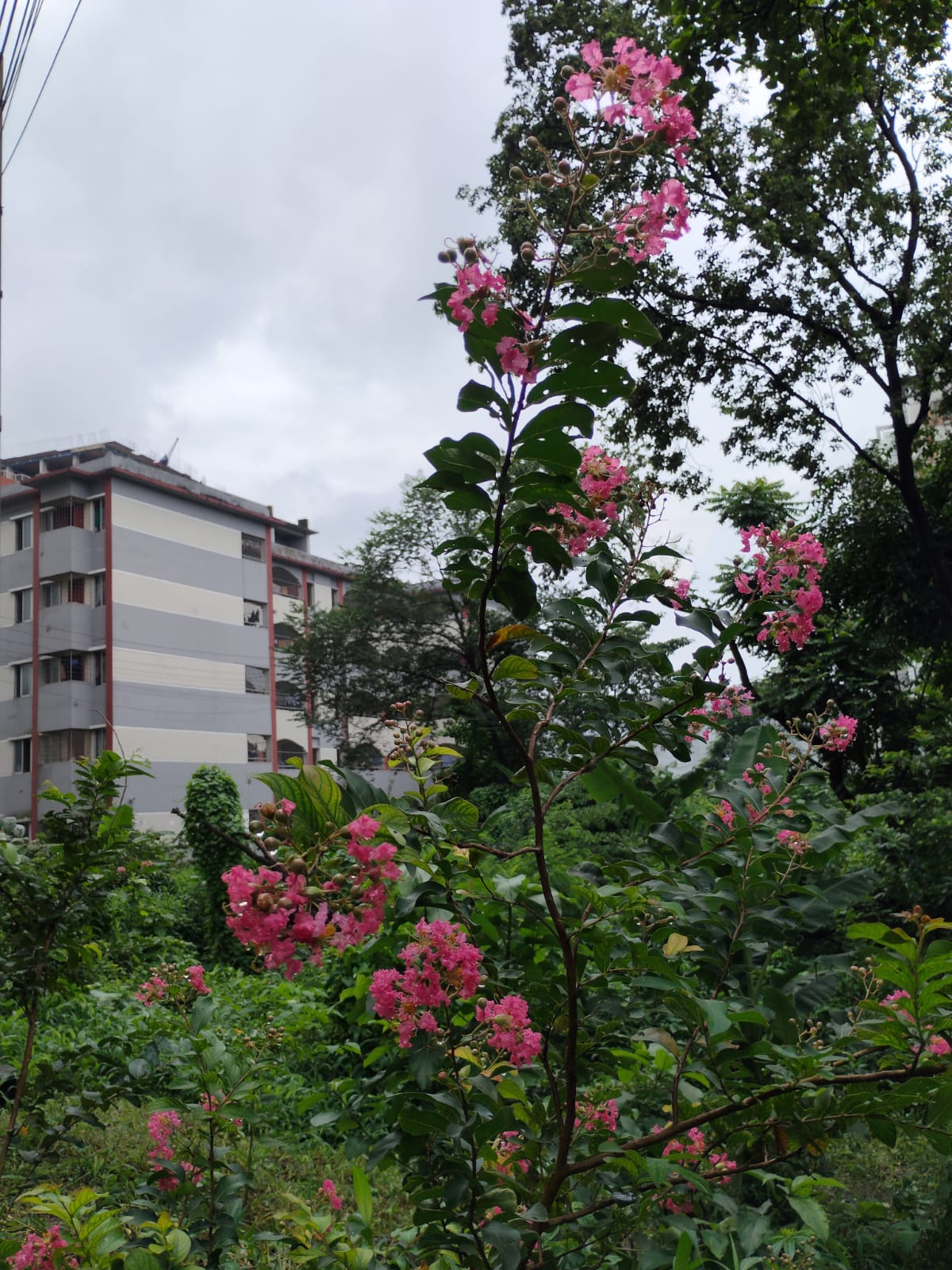
Dhaka Central University (Bangla College Campus) Shahid Sagar Hall.

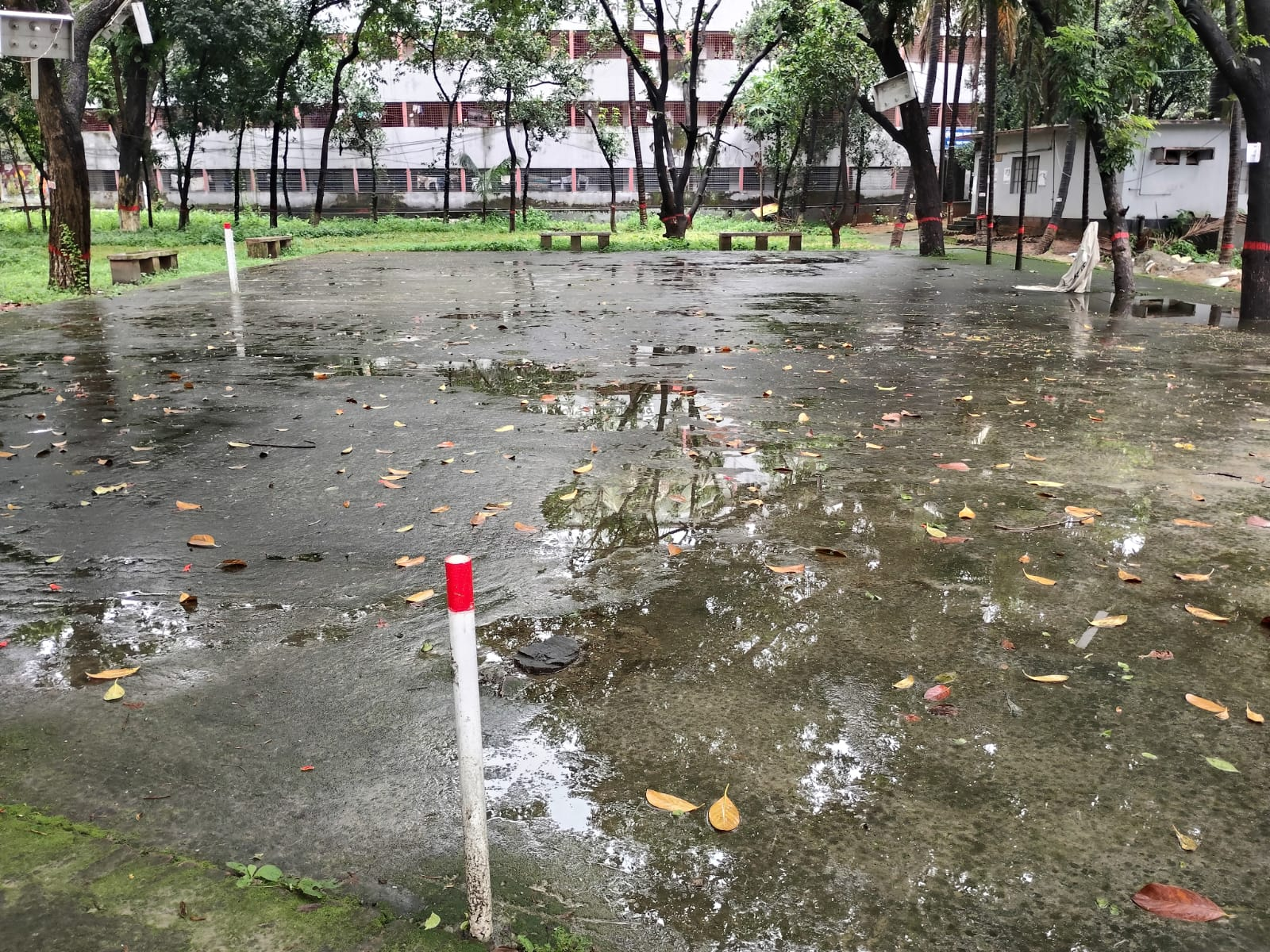
Dhaka Central University (Bangla College Campus) Tennis Square.

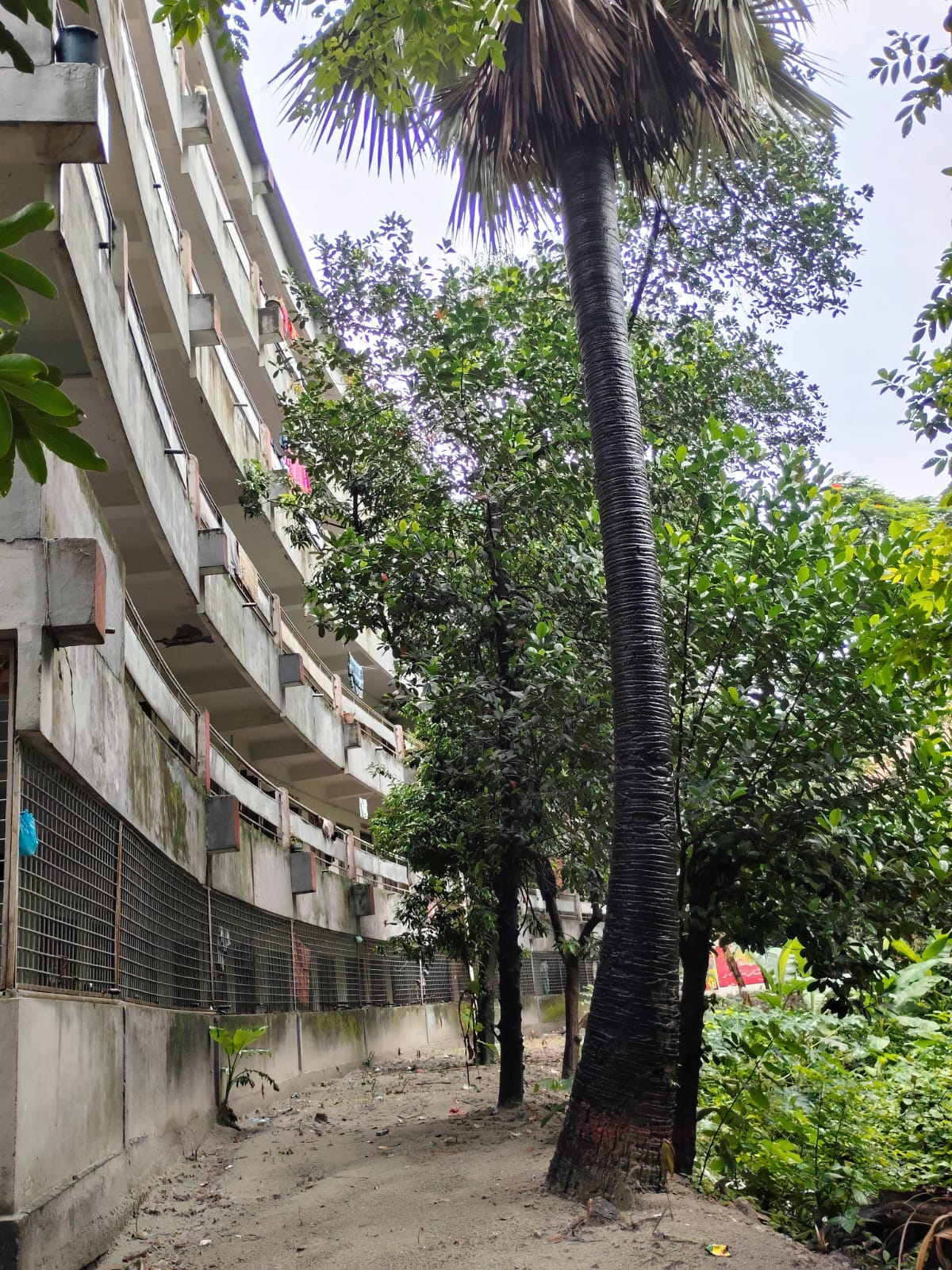
The back view of Principal Abul Kashem Hall of Dhaka Central University (Bangla College Campus).

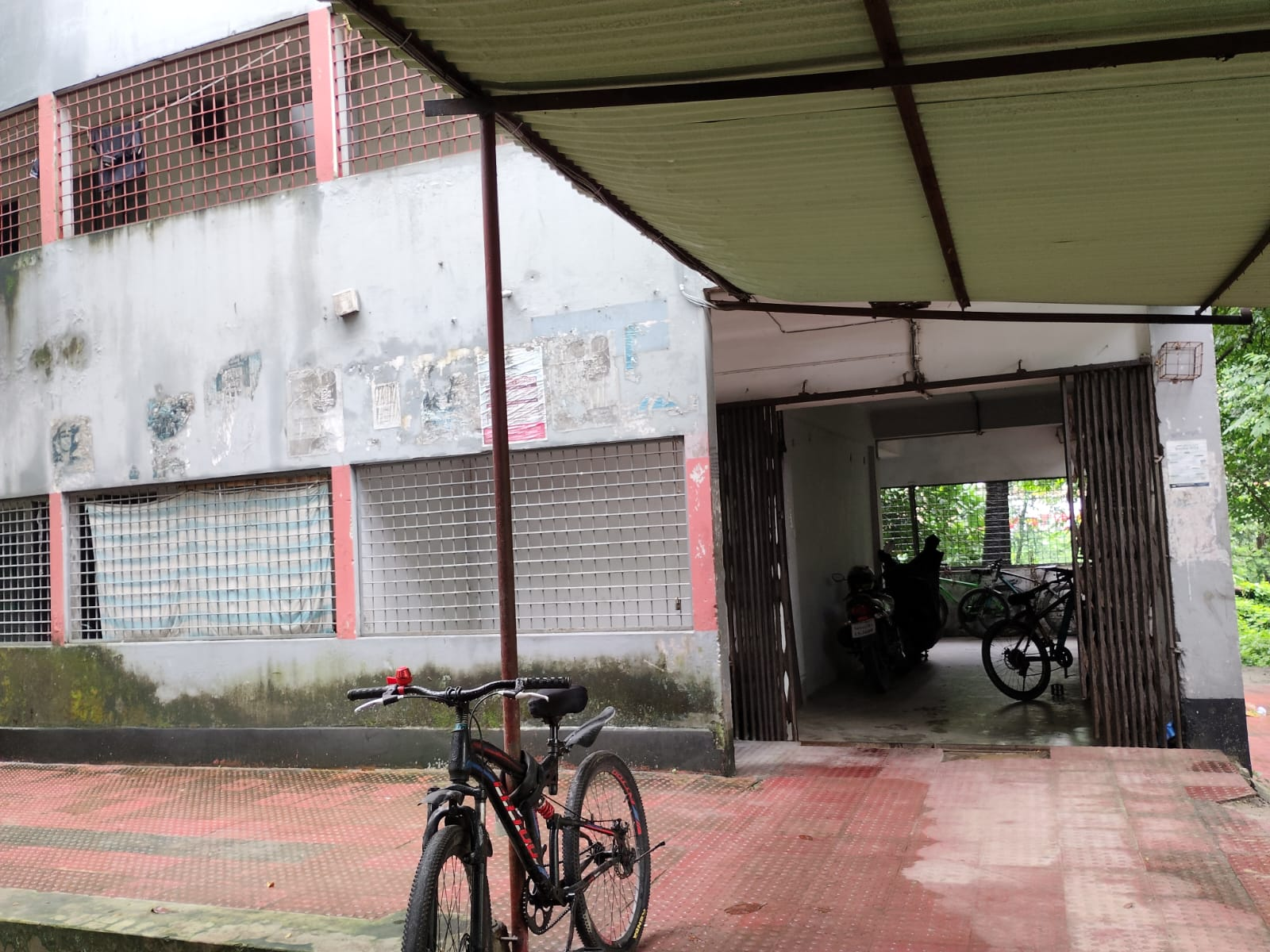
Reading room of Principal Abul Kashem Hall of Dhaka Central University (Bangla College Campus).

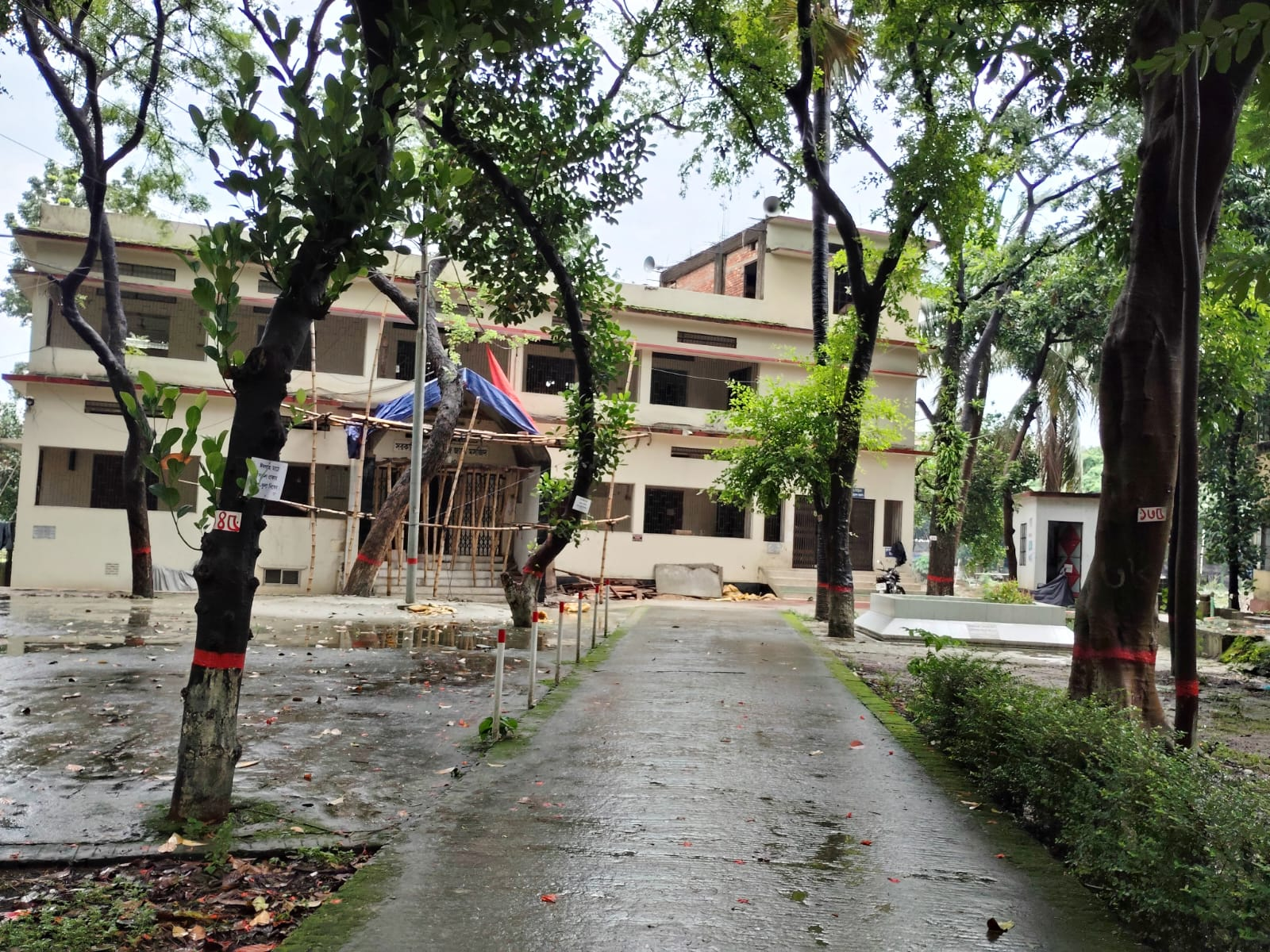
Mosque of Dhaka Central University (Bangla College Campus).

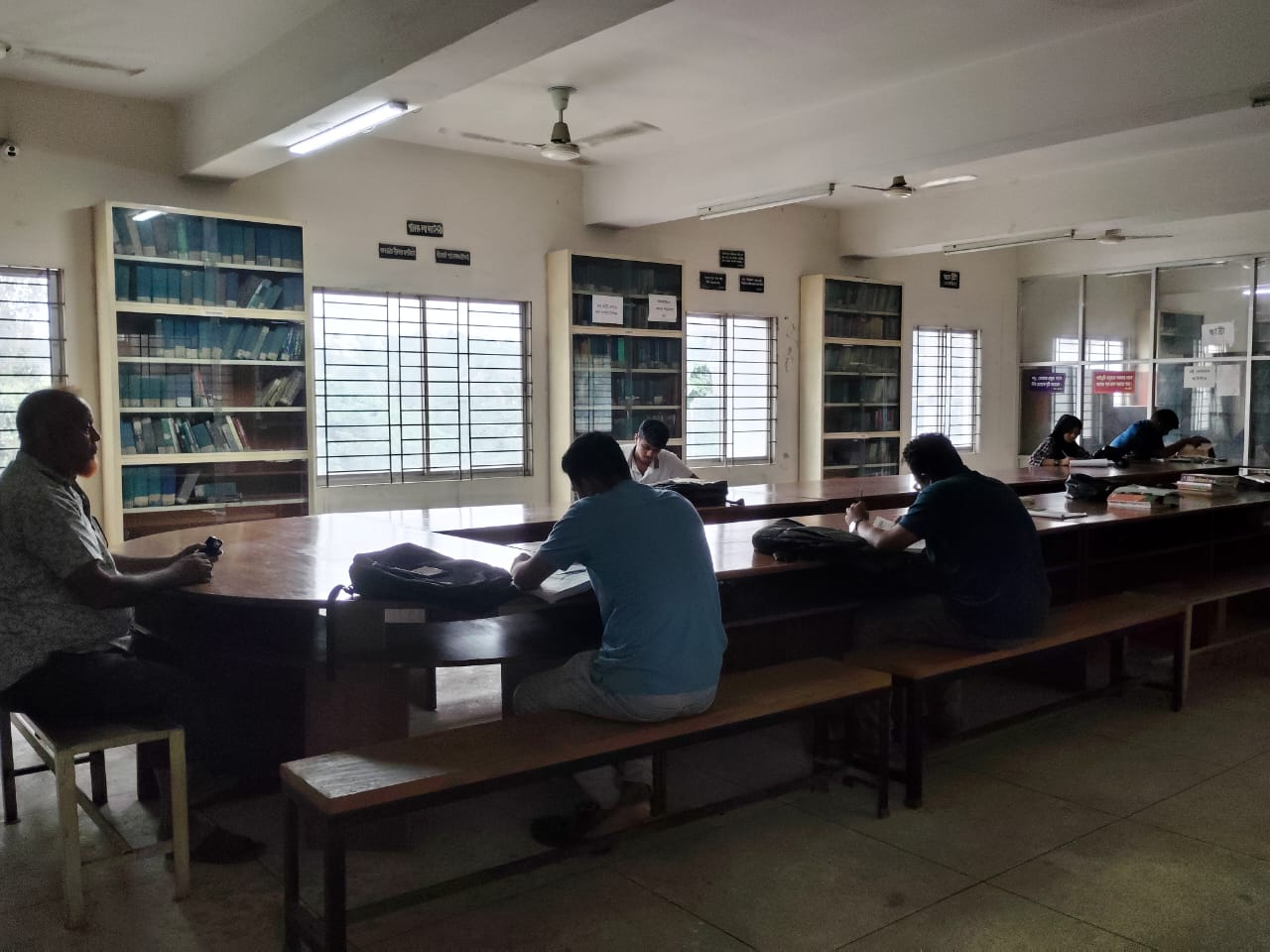
Dhaka Central University (Bangla College Campus) Library Reading Room.

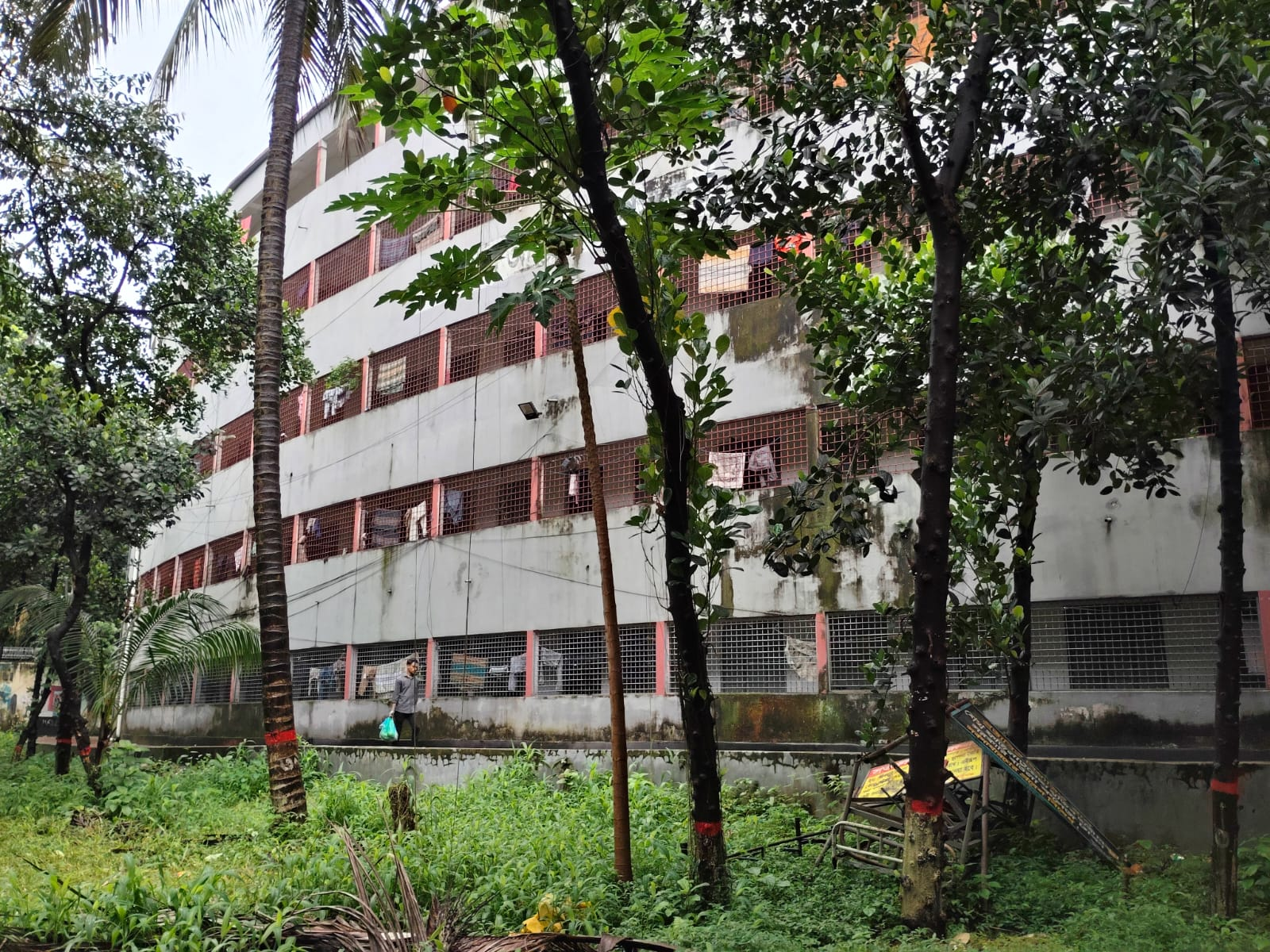
Dhaka Central University (Bangla College Campus) Principal Abul Kashem Hall.

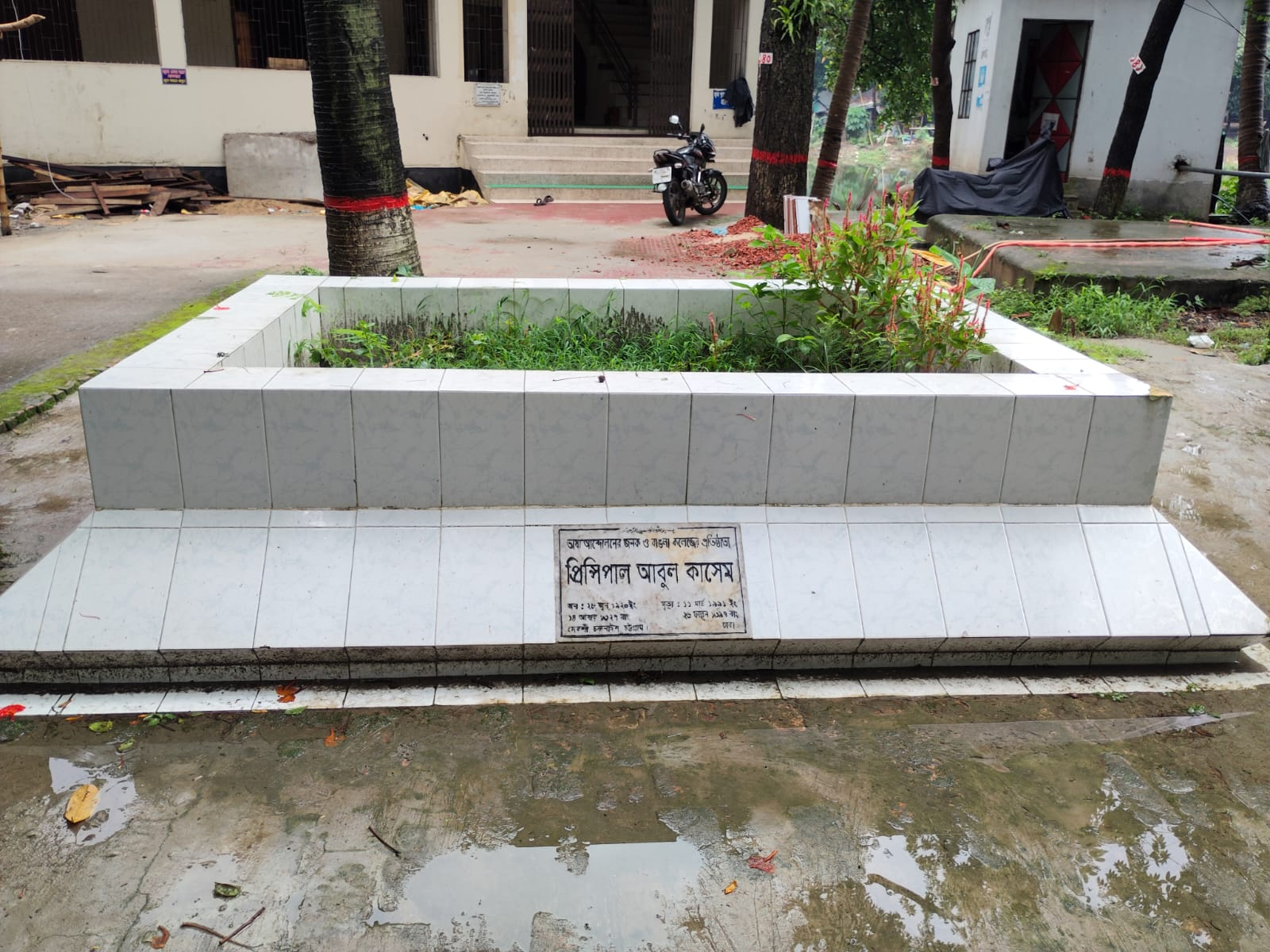
Grave of Principal Abul Kashem, Founder of the Bangla College Campus, Dhaka Central University.

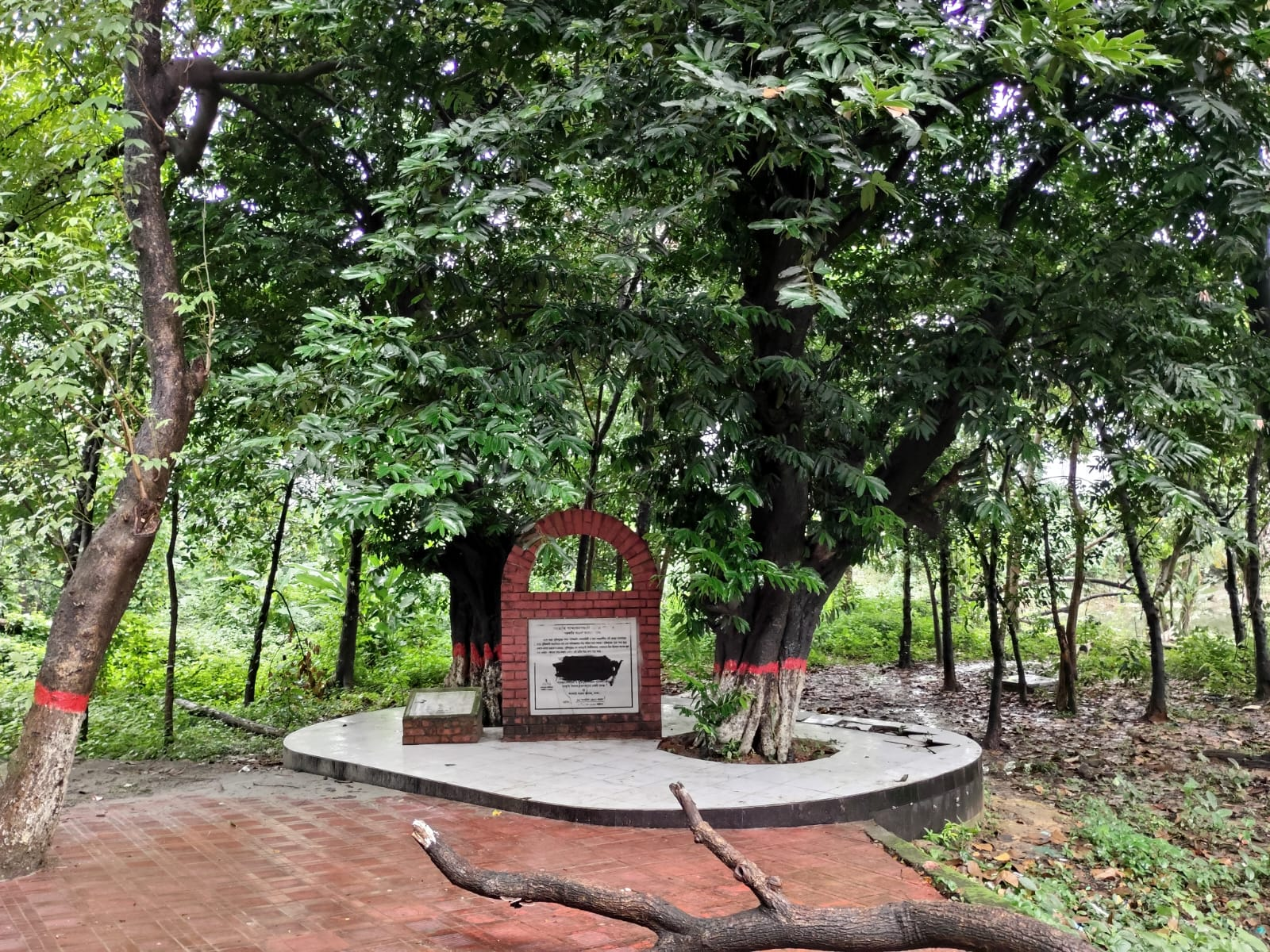
Martyrs' Memorial Site–1, Bangla College Campus, Dhaka Central University.

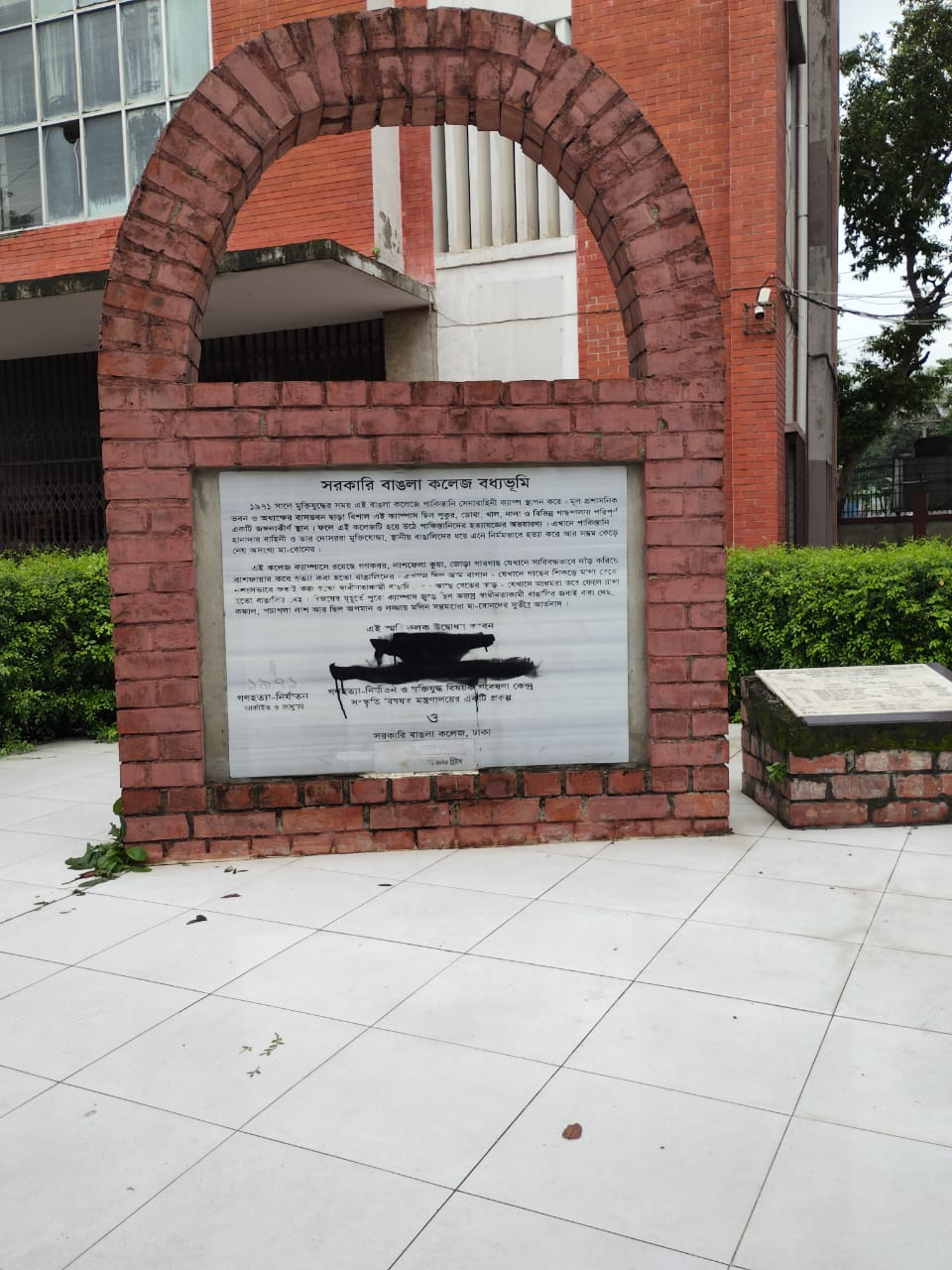
Second Mass Killing Site, Bangla College Campus, Dhaka Central University.

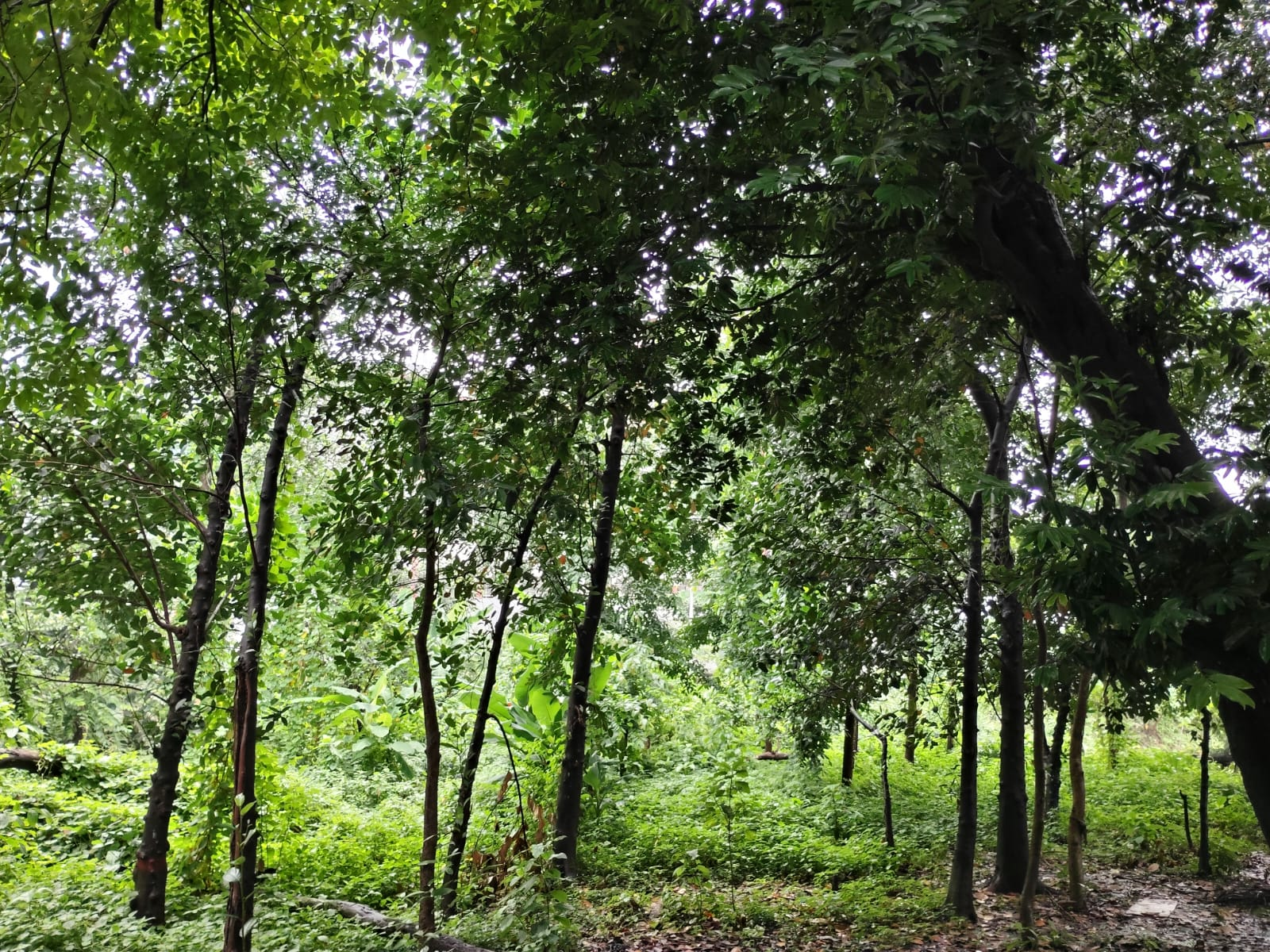
Dhaka Central University (Bangla College Campus) Aranyak.

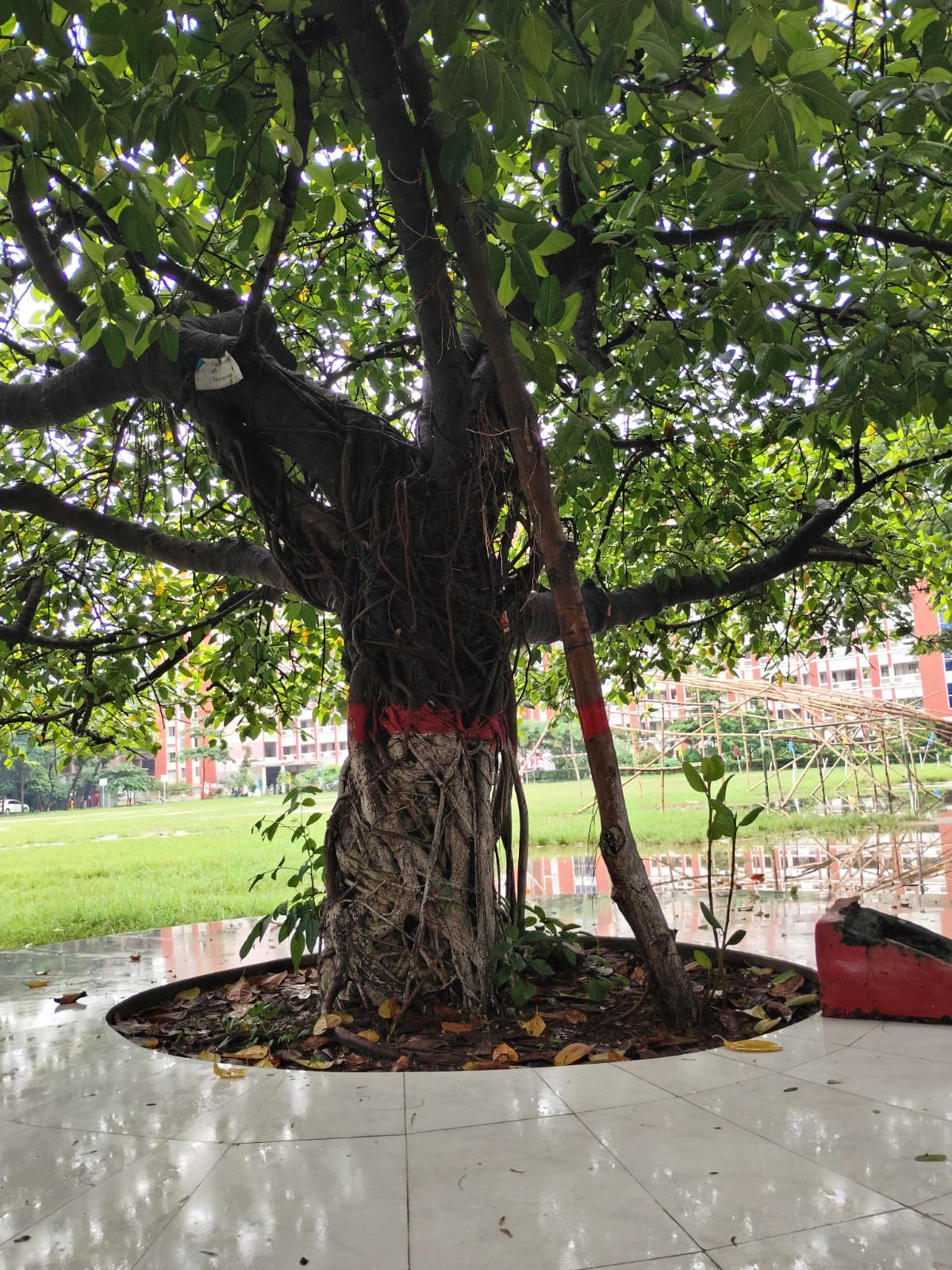
Dhaka Central University (Bangla College Campus) Battala.

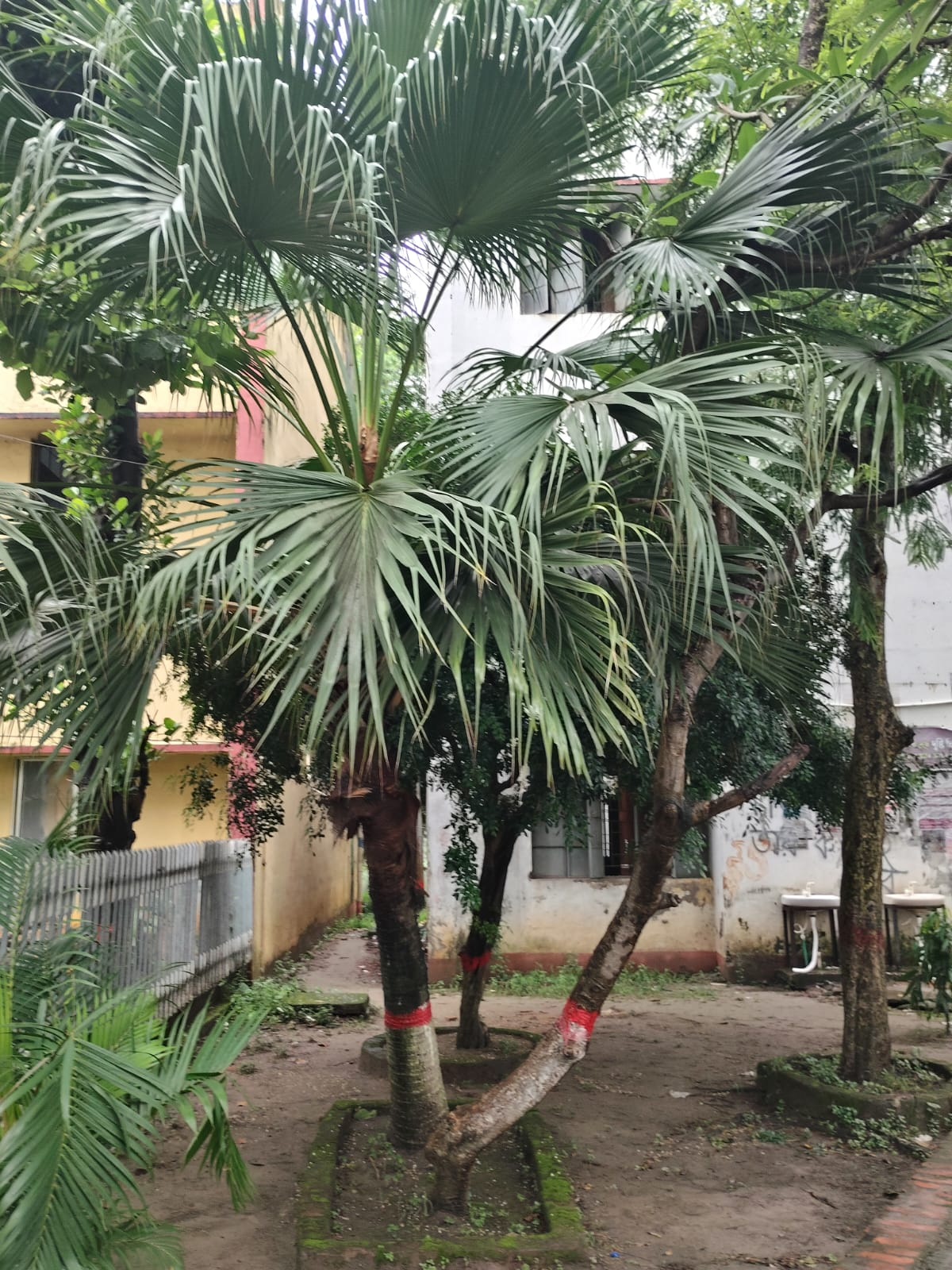
Dhaka Central University (Bangla College Campus) Jibanananda Banalata Chattar.

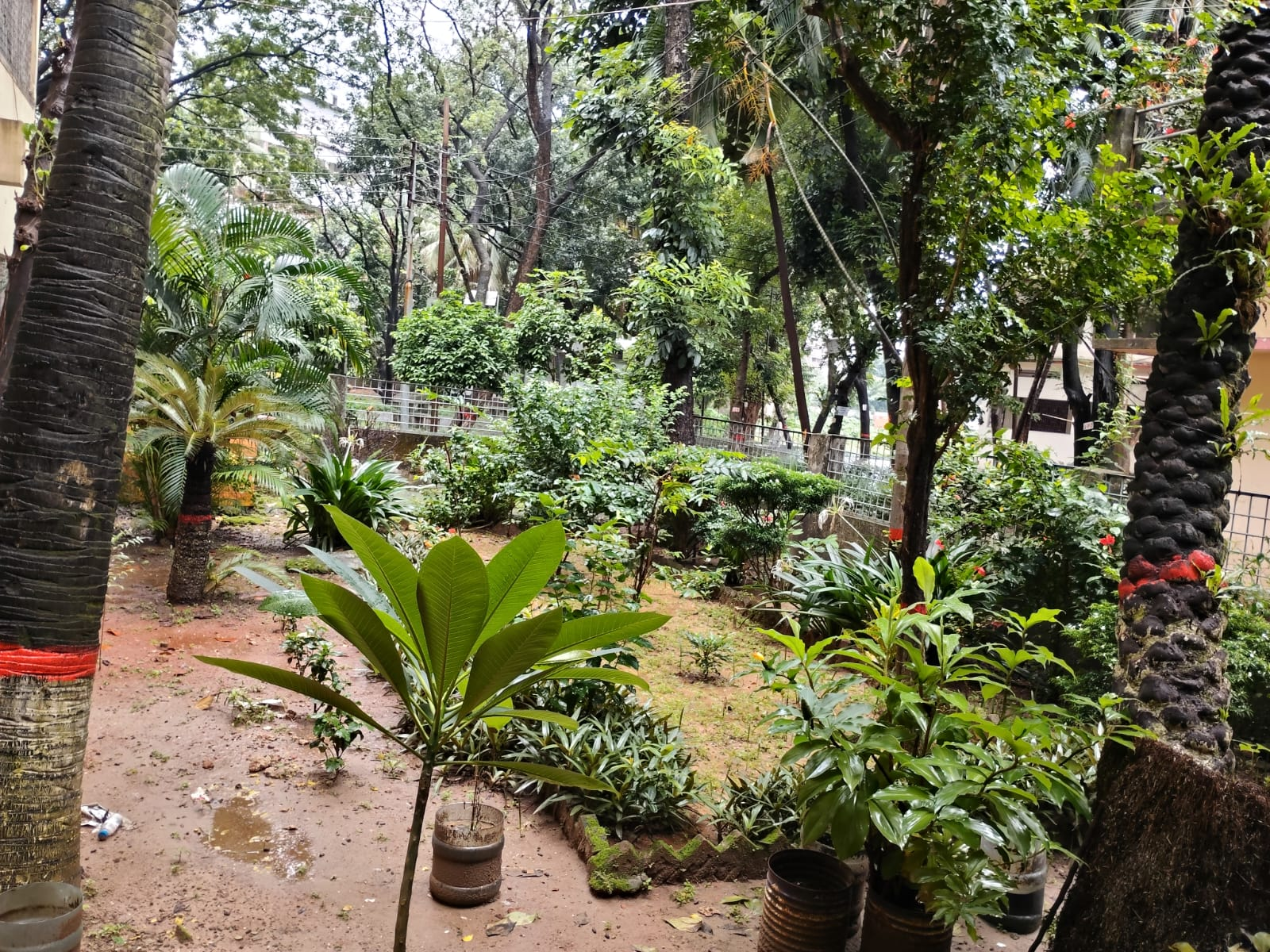
Garden of the Zoology Department of Dhaka Central University (Bangla College Campus).

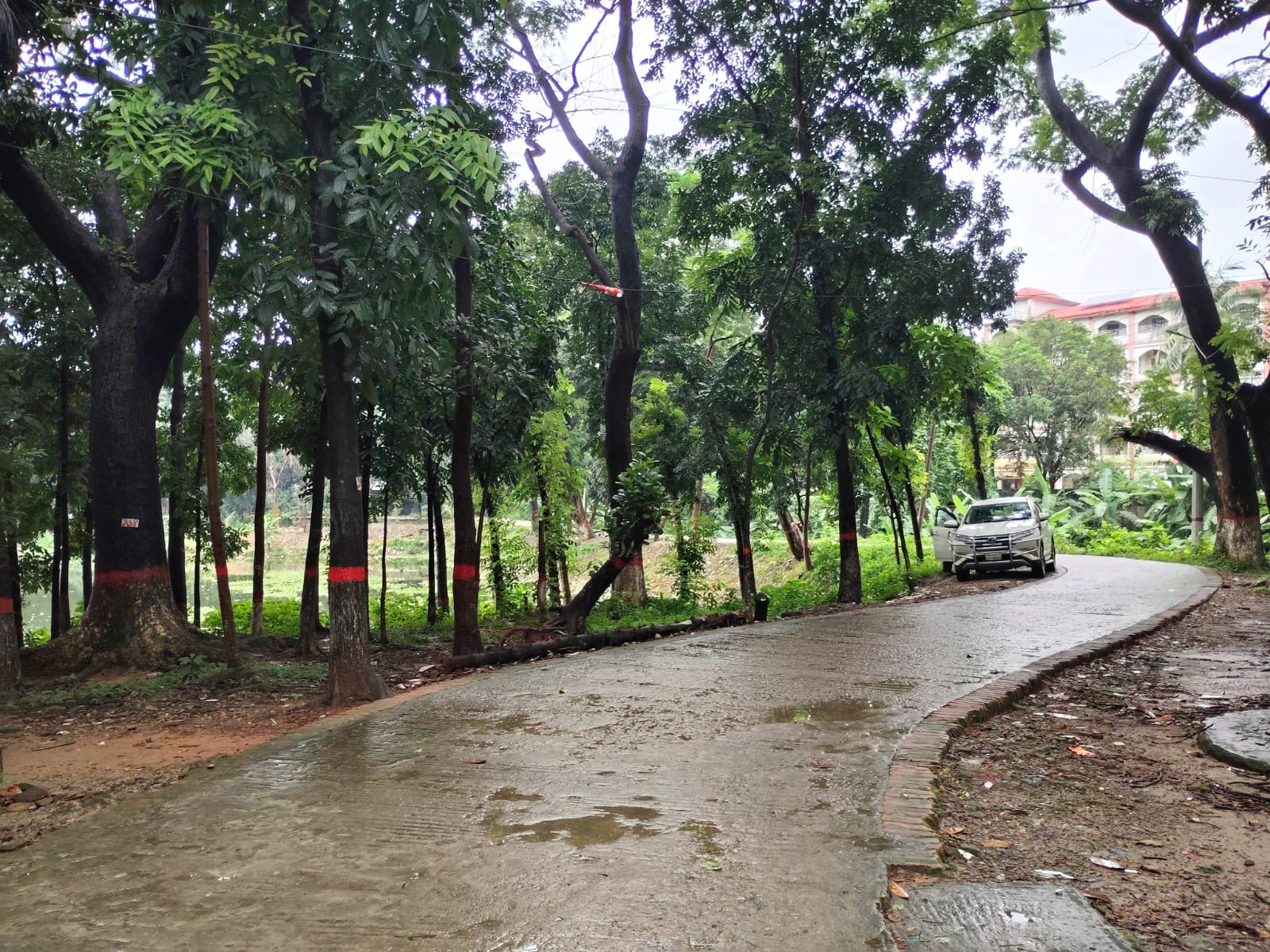
Love Road of Dhaka Central University (Bangla College Campus).

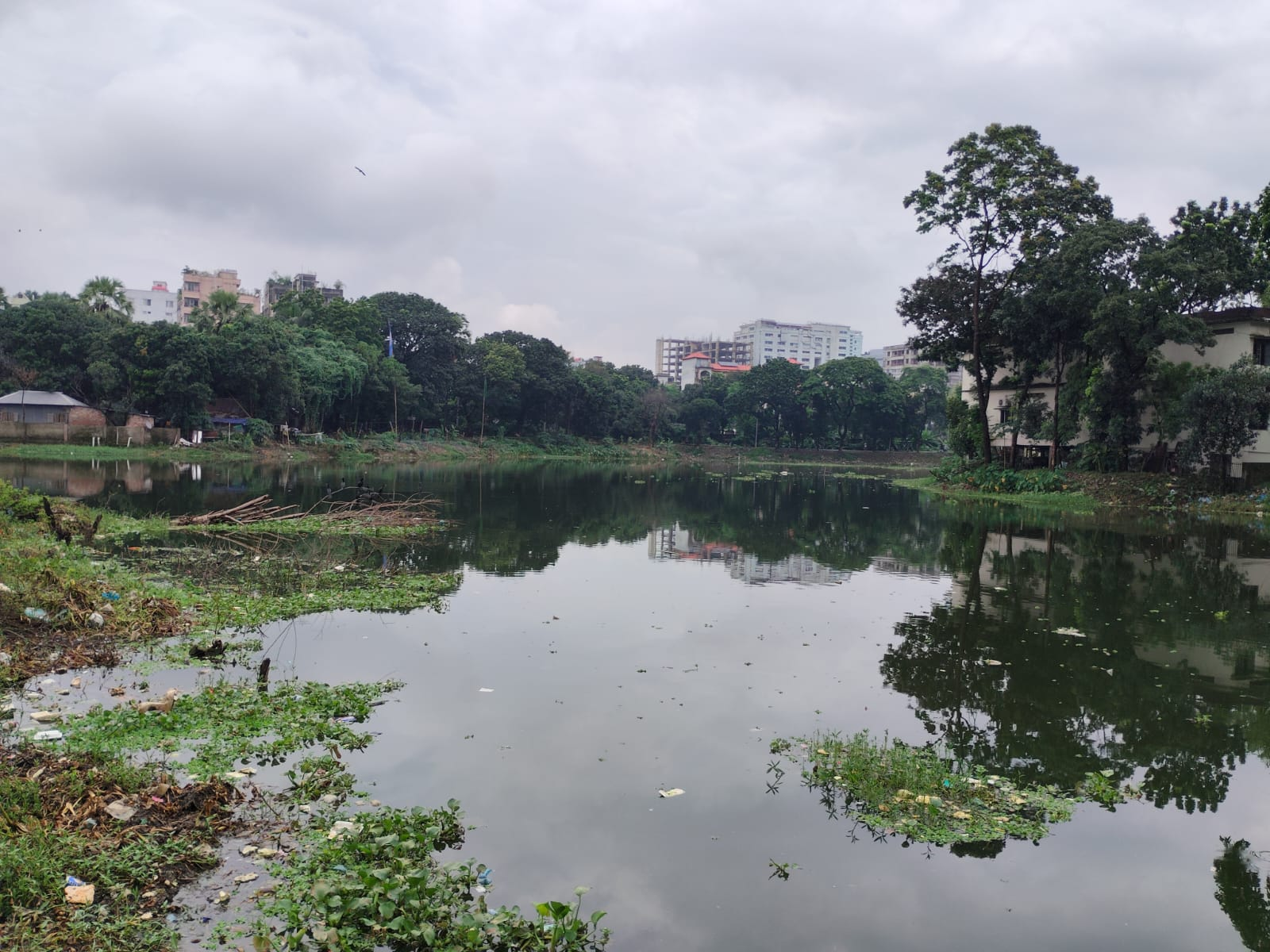
Lake of Dhaka Central University (Bangla College Campus).

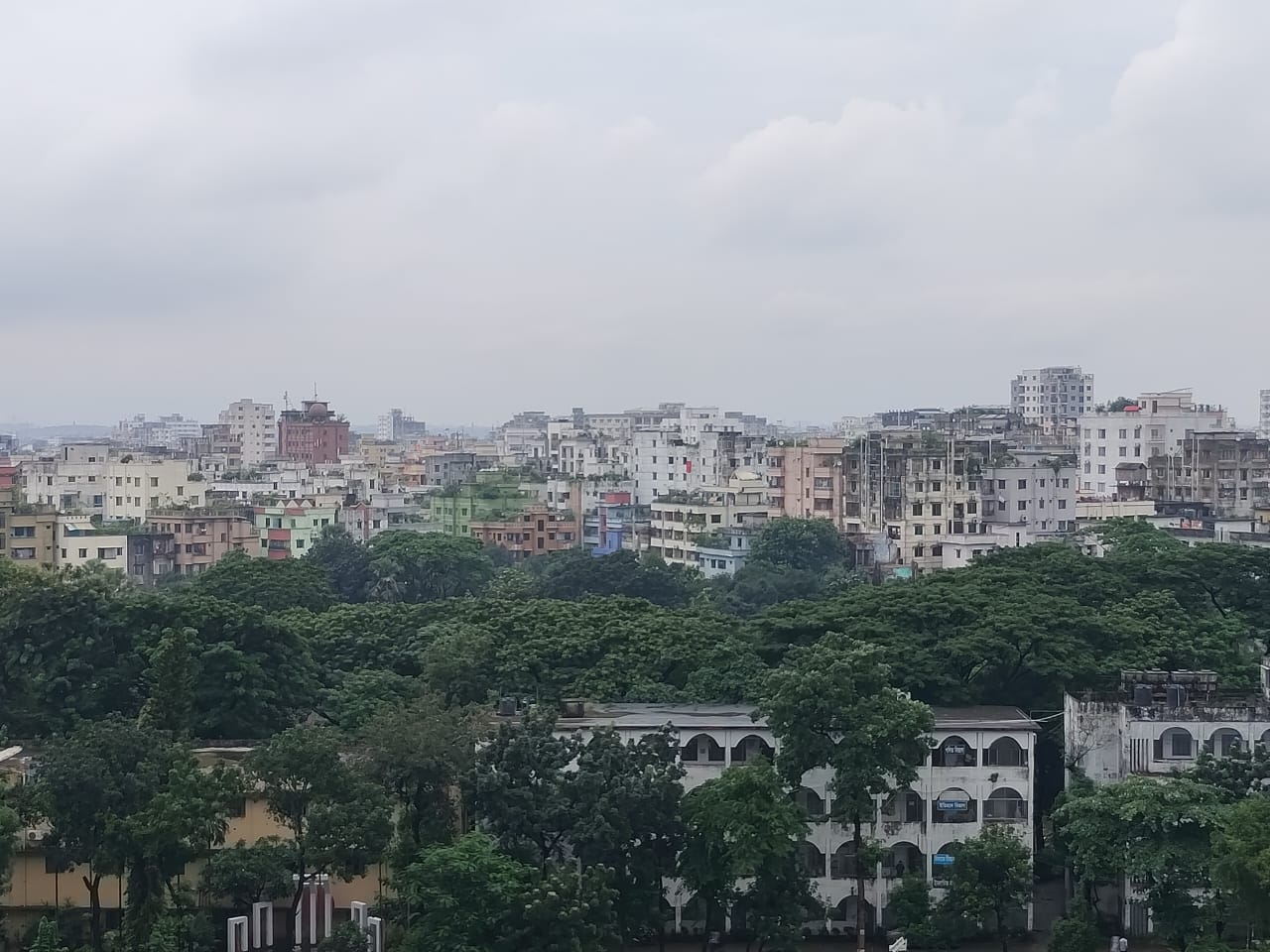
Skyline of Dhaka Central University (Bangla College Campus).

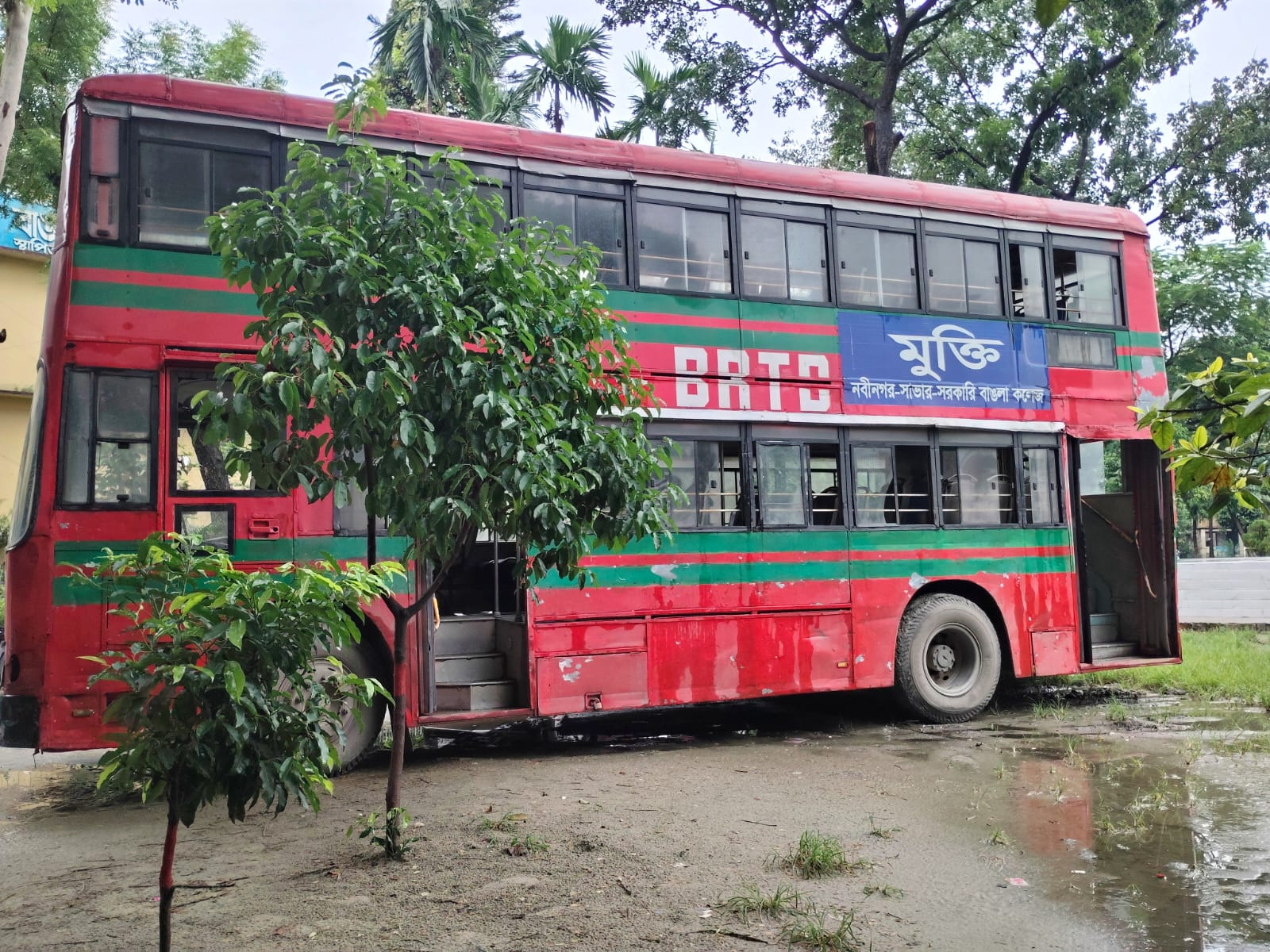
Dhaka Central University (Bangla College Campus) bus Mukti.

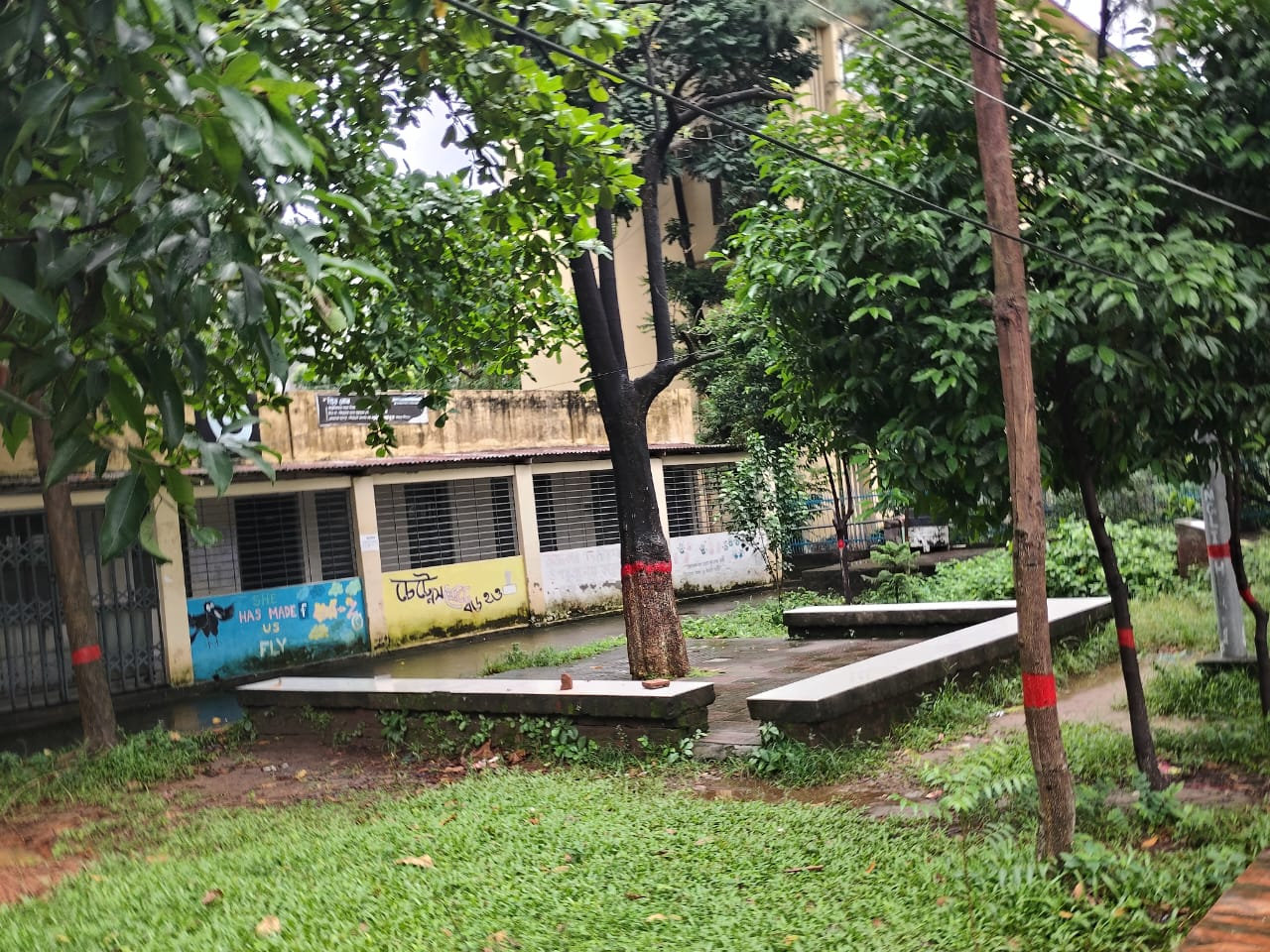
Open Stage (Chatim Tala), Bangla College Campus, Dhaka Central University.

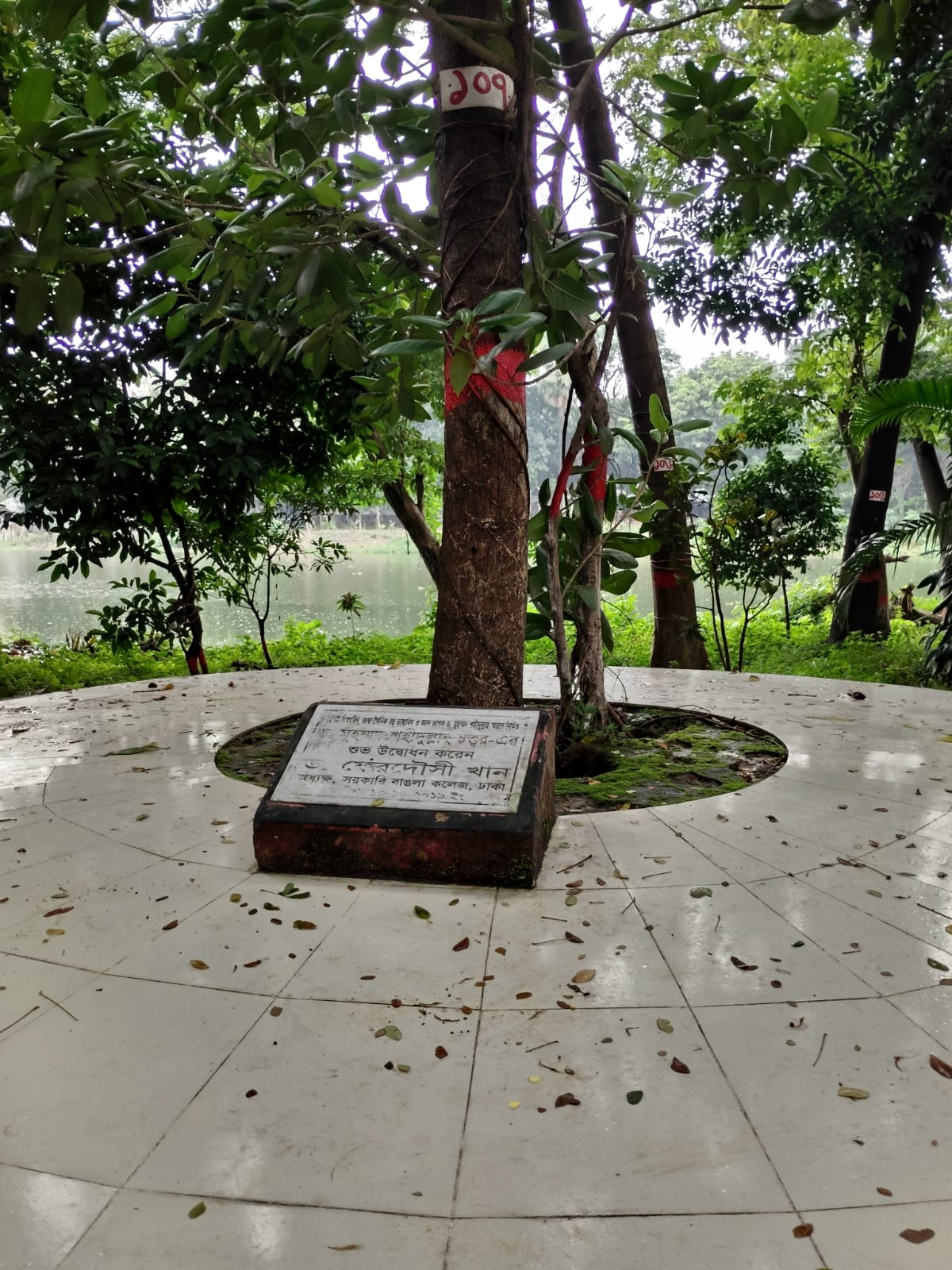
Dhaka Central University (Bangla College Campus) Shahidullah Chattar.

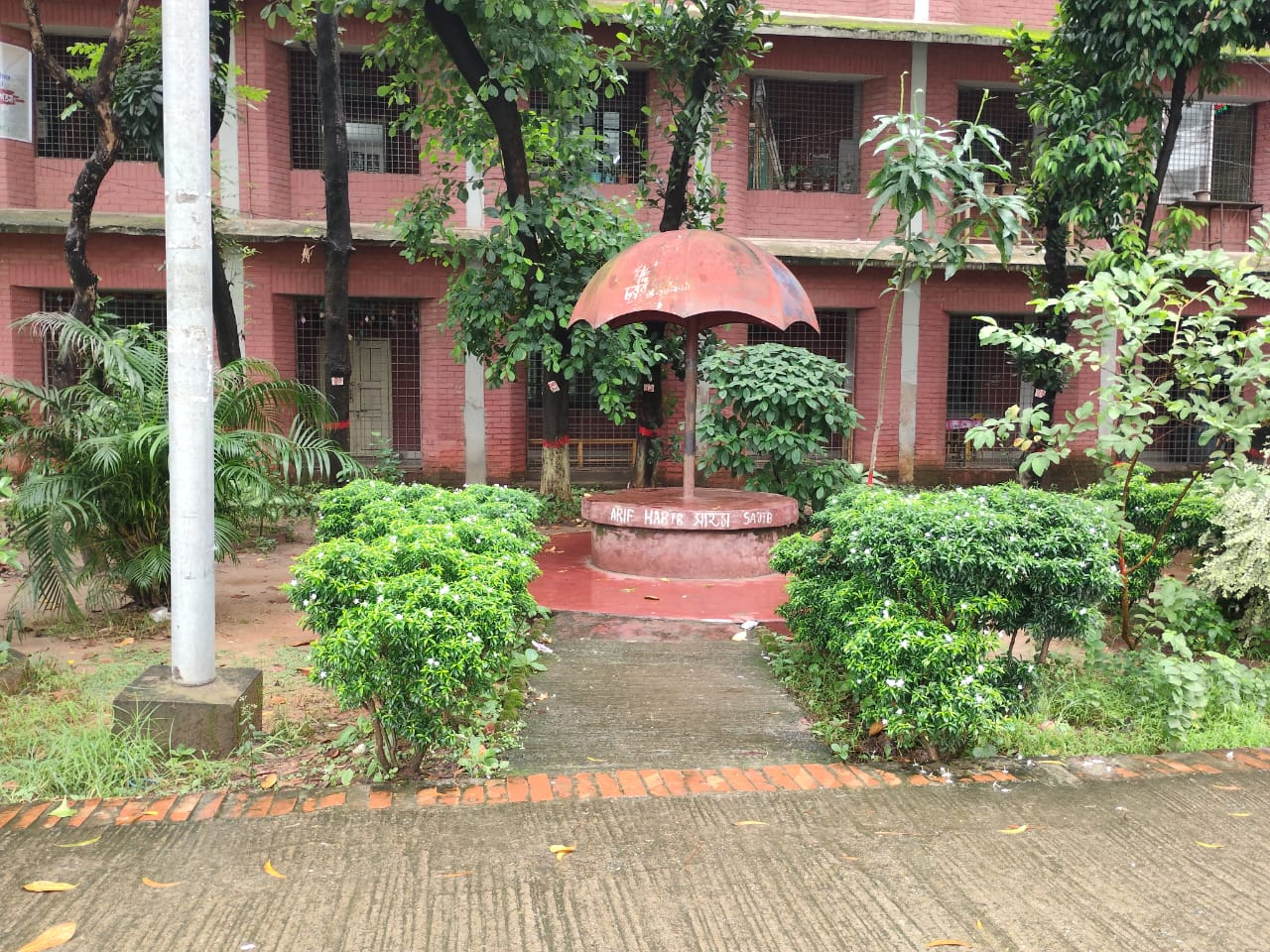
Dhaka Central University (Bangla College Campus) Santiniketan.

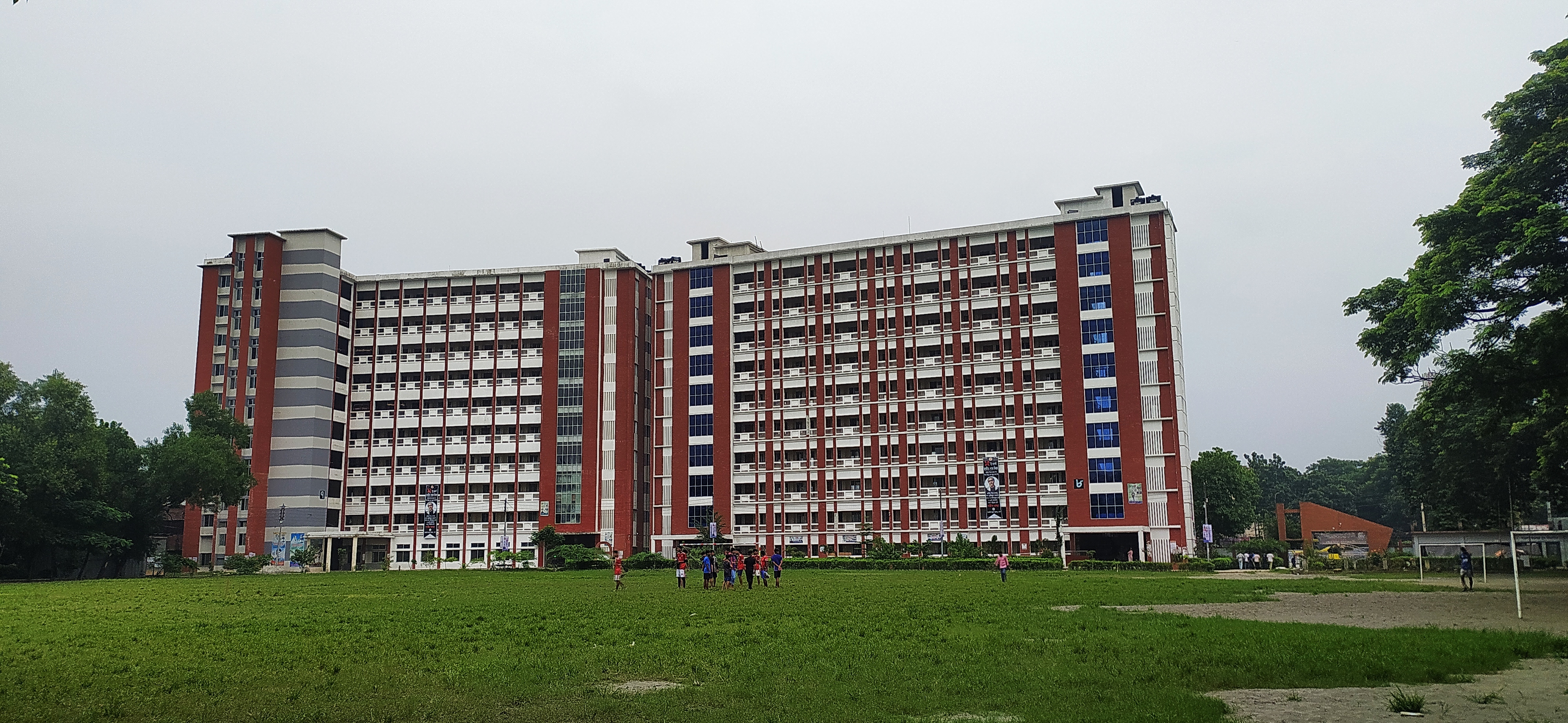
Dhaka Central University (Bangla College Campus) Building No. 7/8.

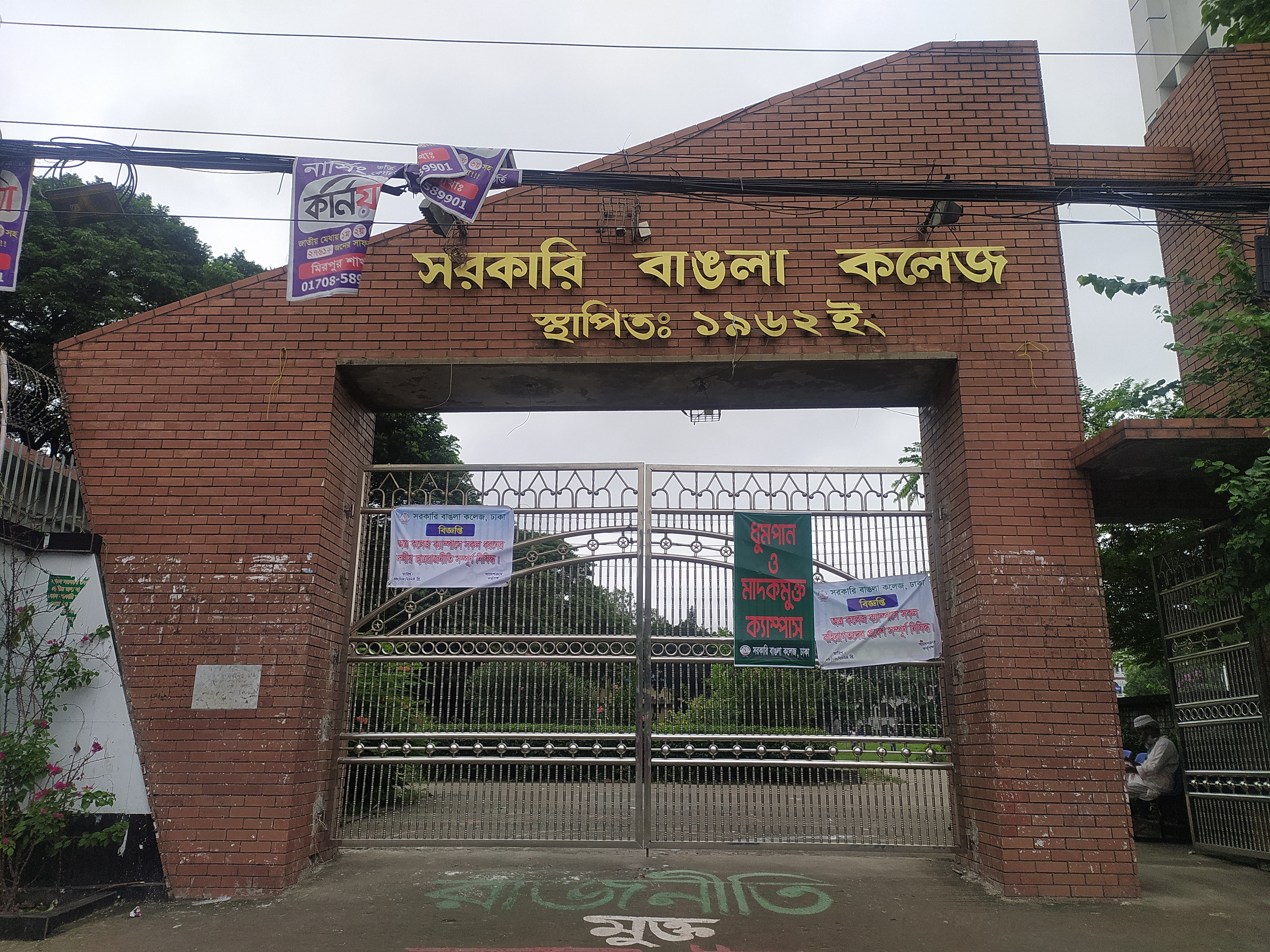
Dhaka Central University (Bangla College Campus) Main gate.

Badrunnesa campus

Front view of the Academic Building of Dhaka Central University (Badrunnesa Campus).

The second Academic Building of Dhaka Central University (Badrunnesa Campus).

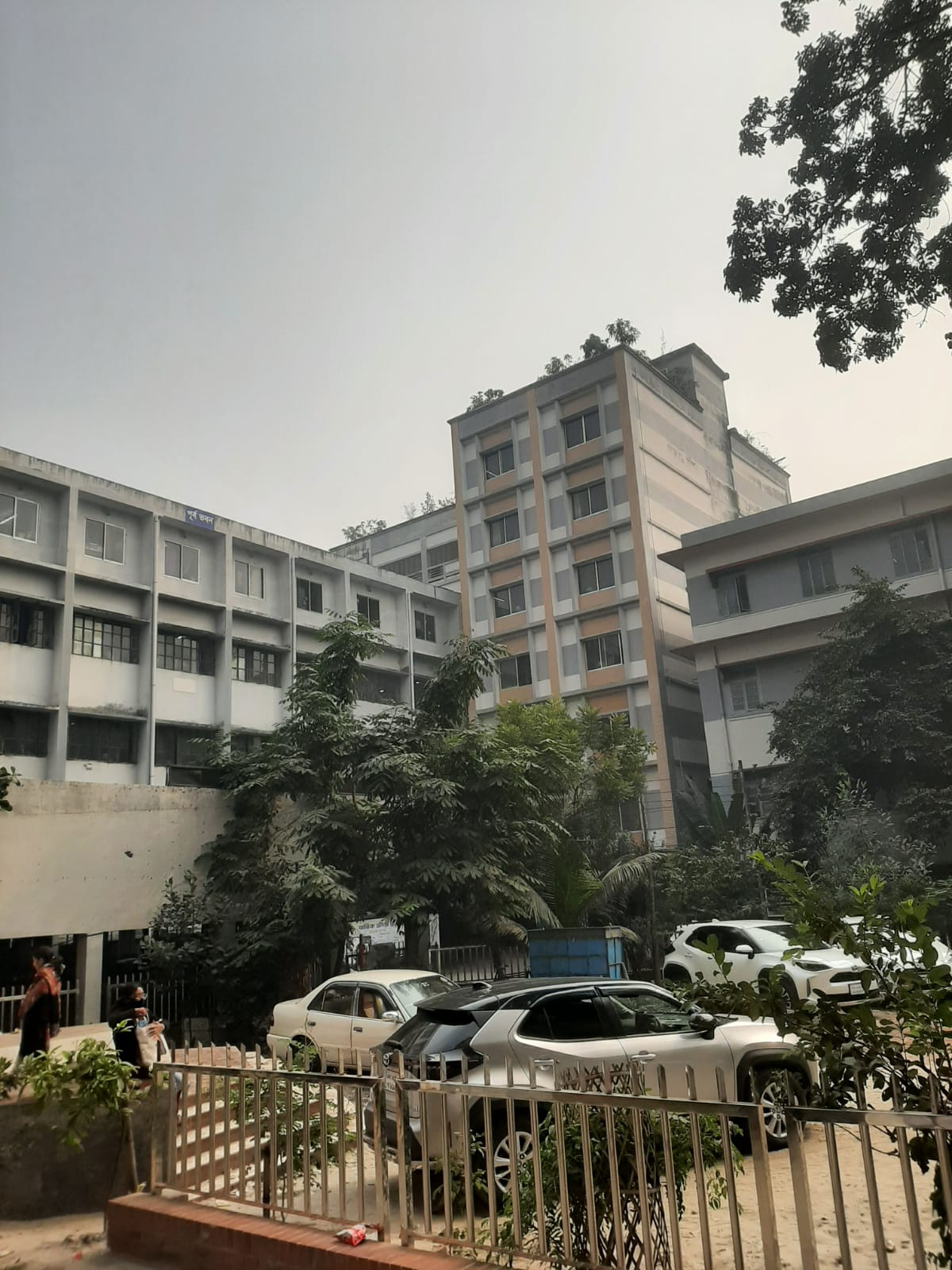
Dhaka Central University (Badrunnesa College Campus) Shaheed Minar premises.

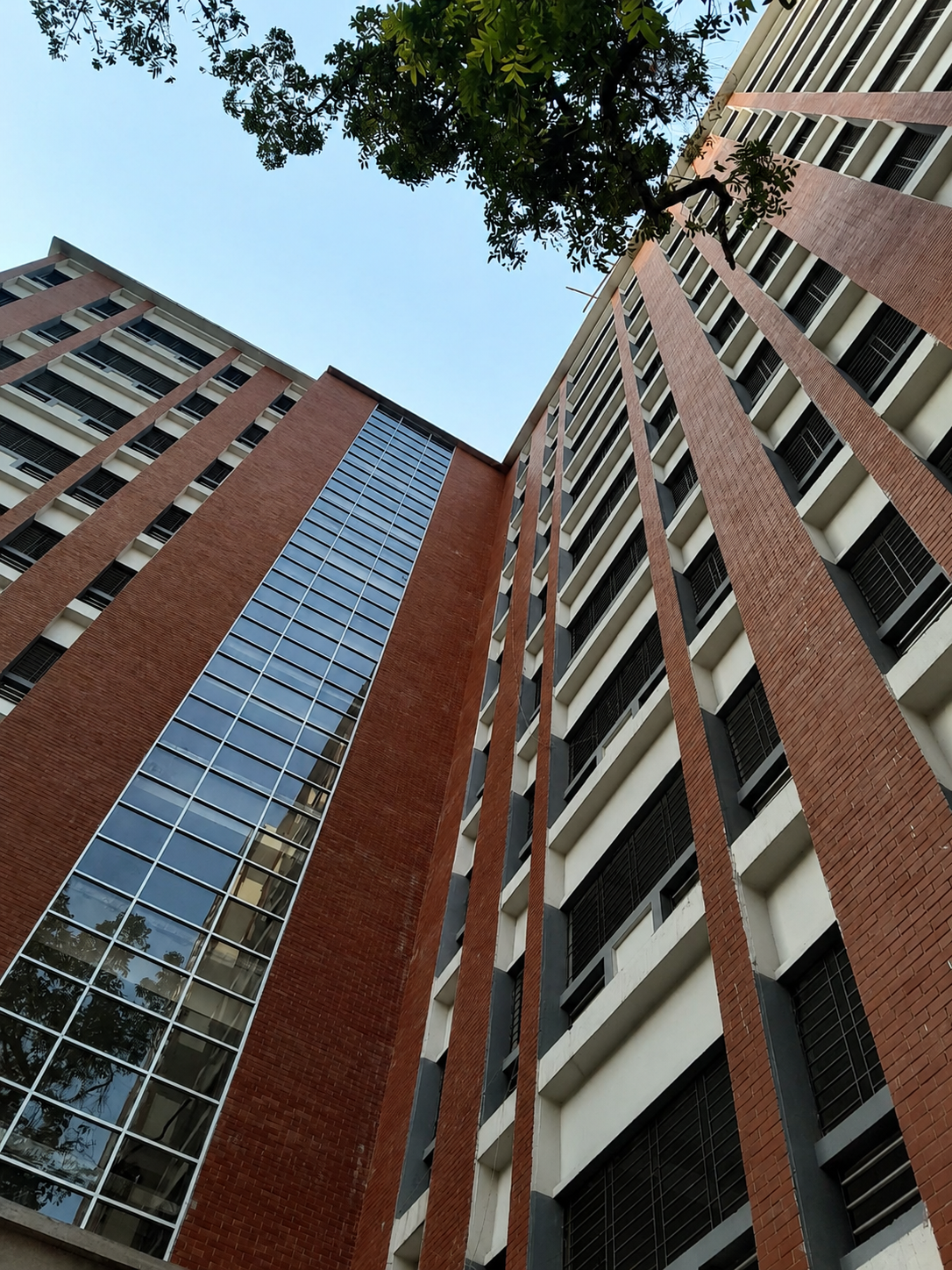
Dhaka Central University (Badrunnesa College Campus) Academic Building.

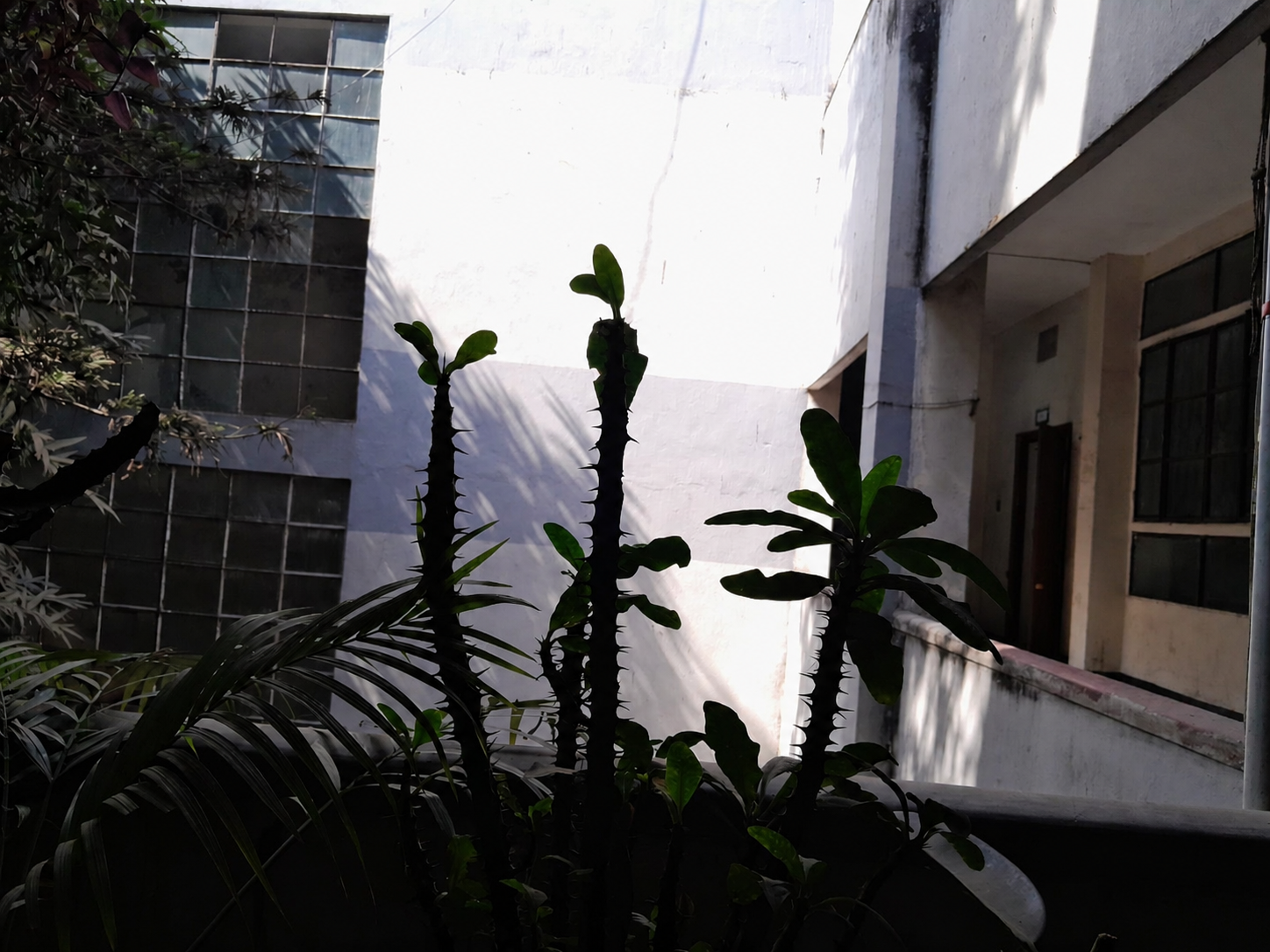
Dhaka Central University (Badrunnesa College Campus) Botany Department premises.

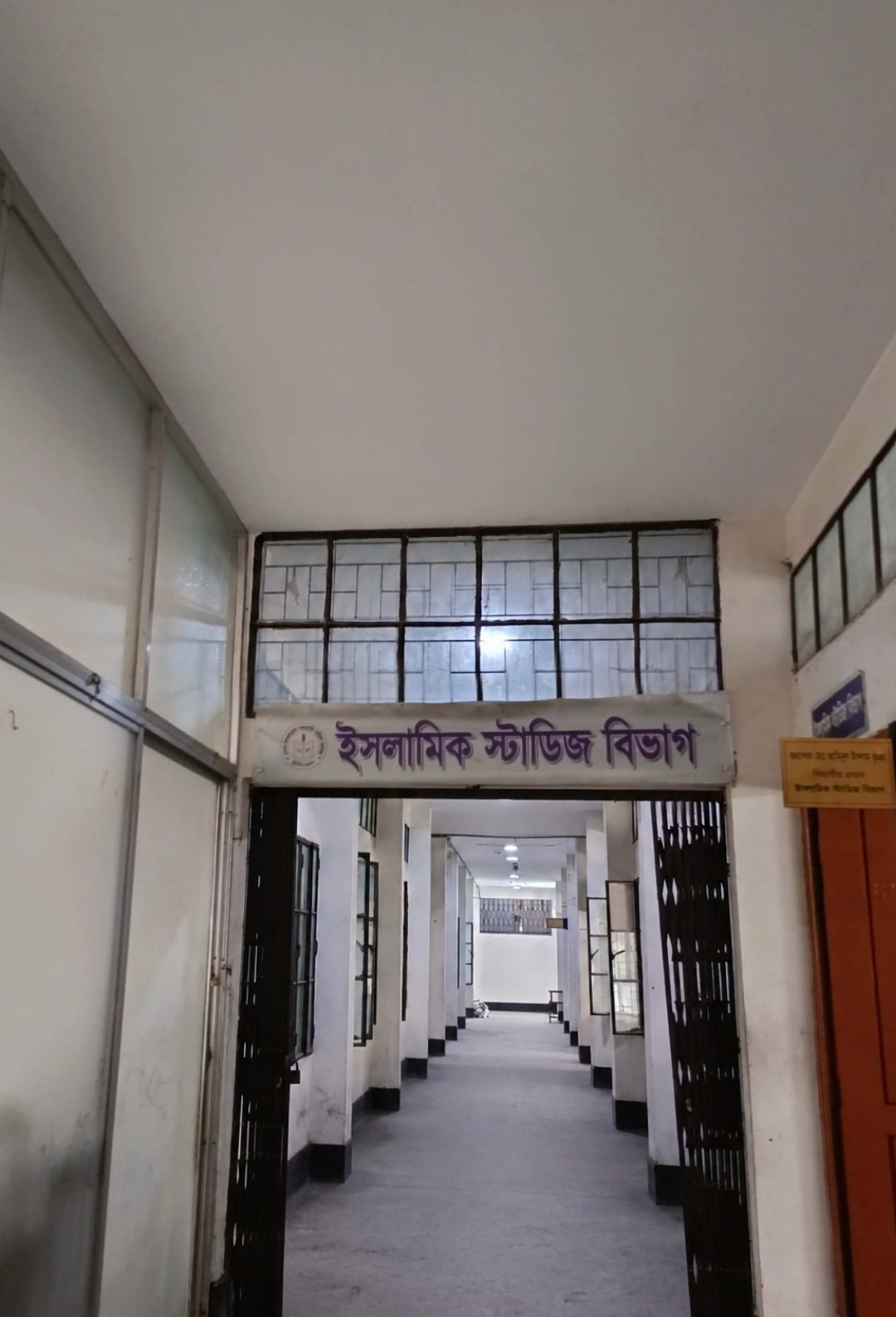
Dhaka Central University (Badrunnesa College Campus) Department of Islamic Studies.

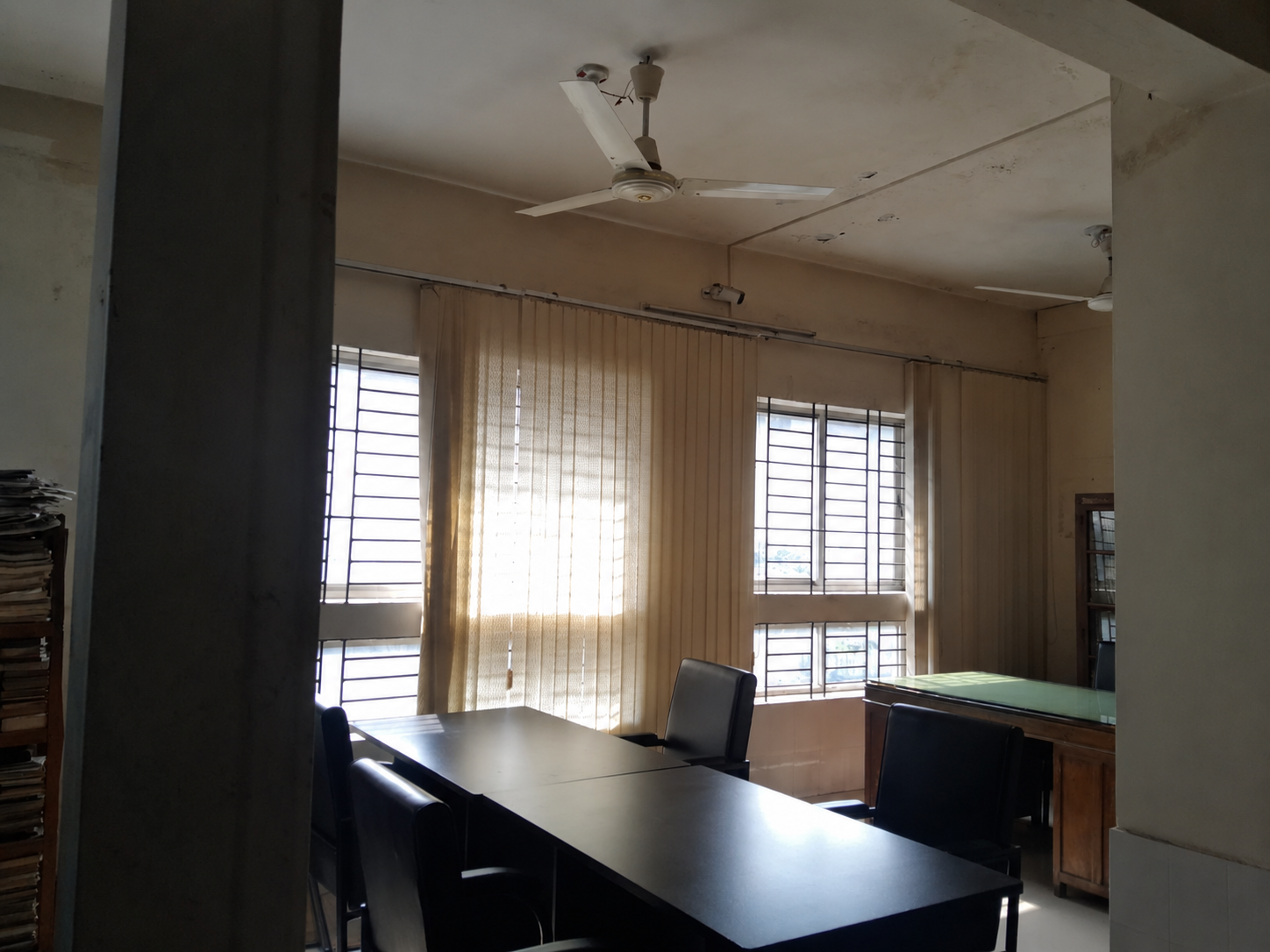
Dhaka Central University (Badrunnesa College Campus) Libraries Teachers' Corner.

Suhrawardy campus

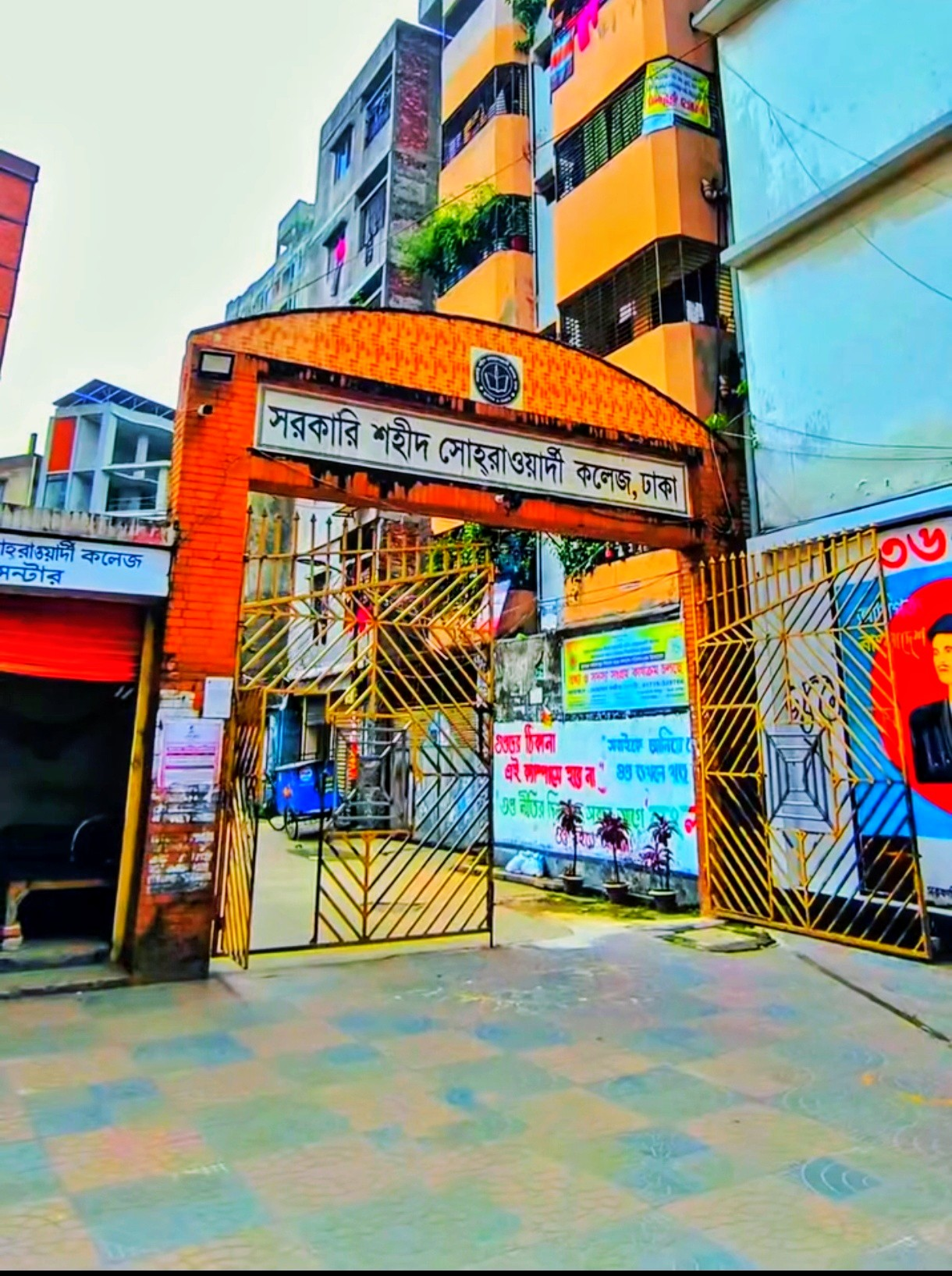
The main gate of Dhaka Central University (Suhrawardy College Campus).

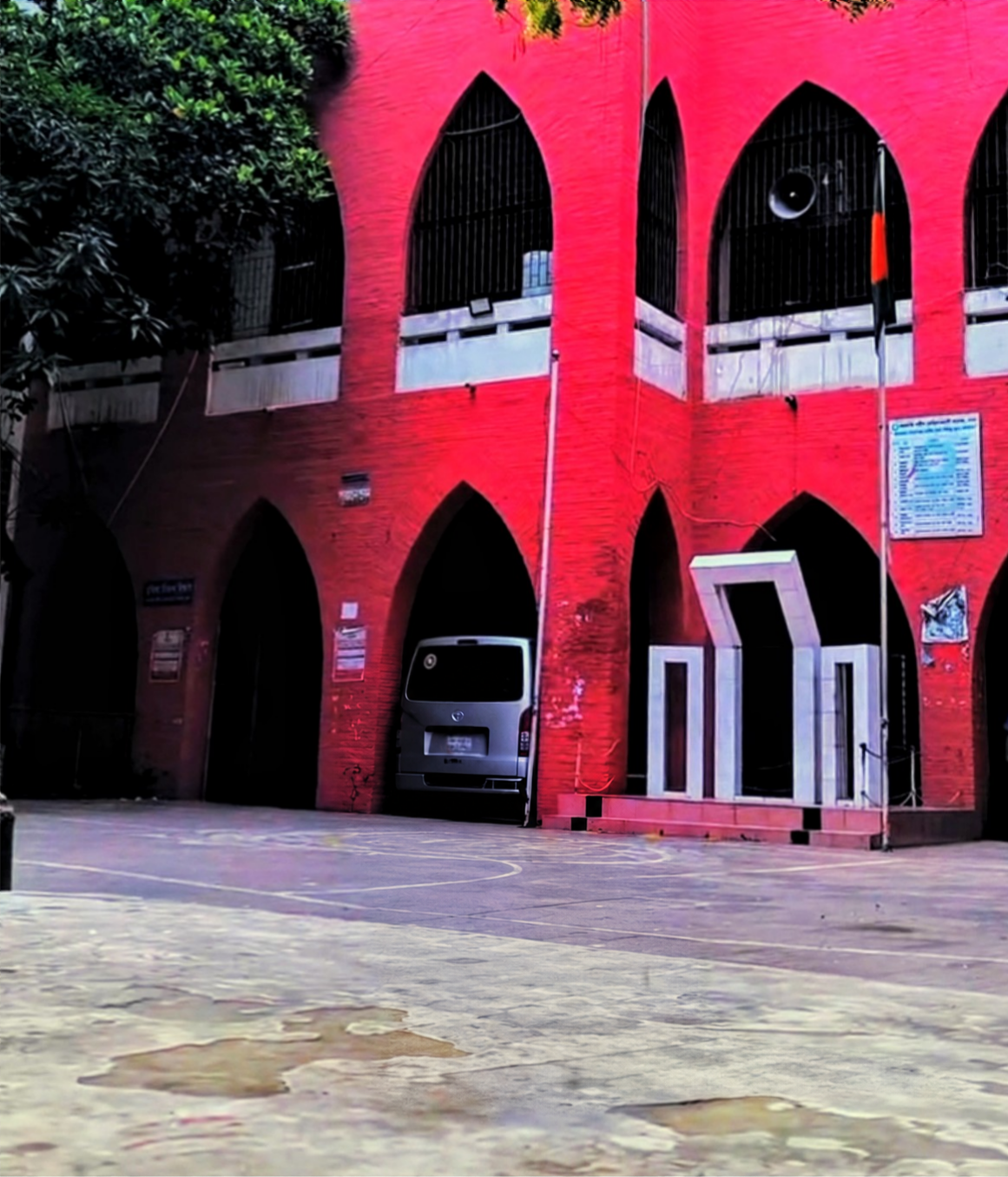
Shaheed Minar of Dhaka Central University (Suhrawardy College Campus).

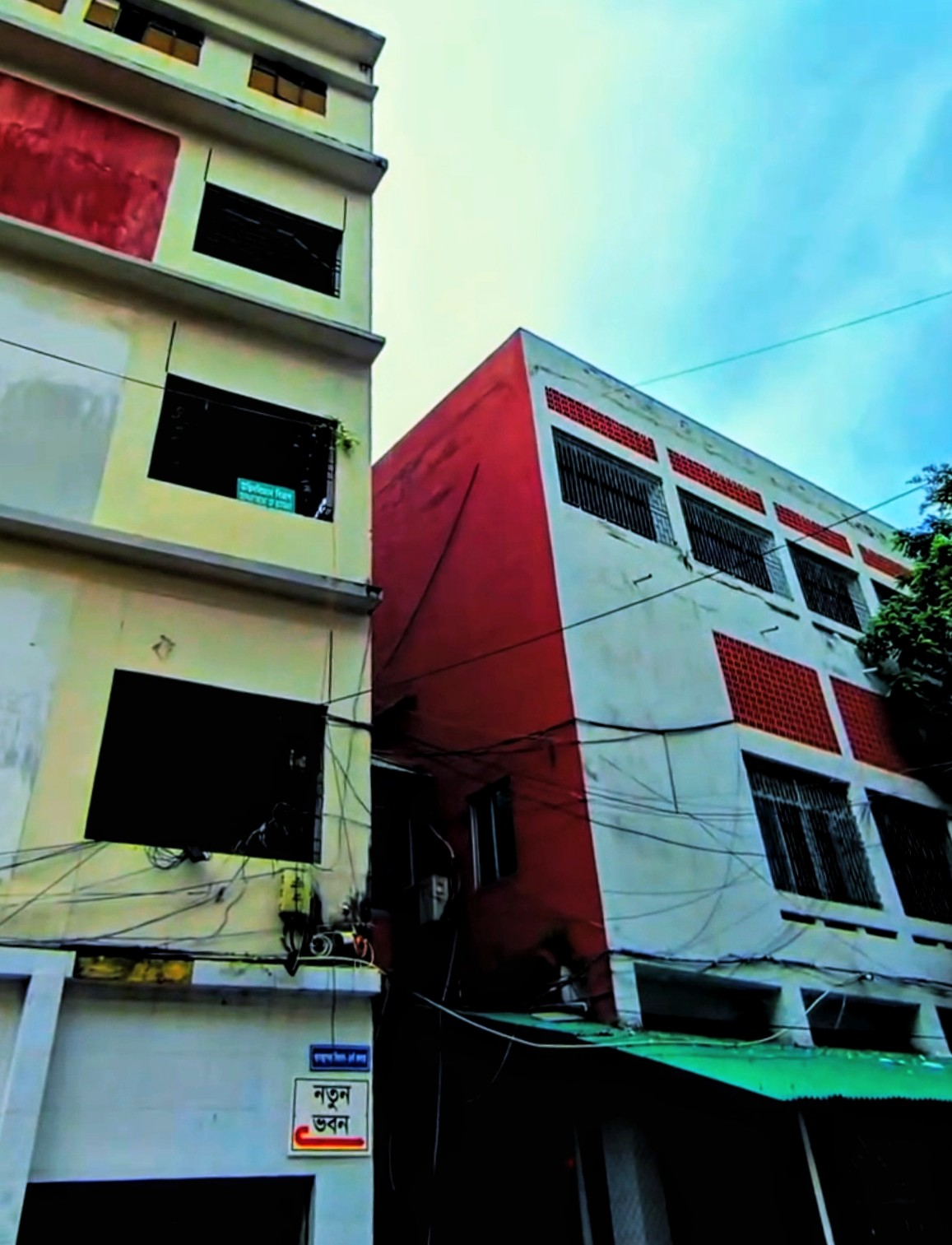
New building of Dhaka Central University (Suhrawardy College Campus).

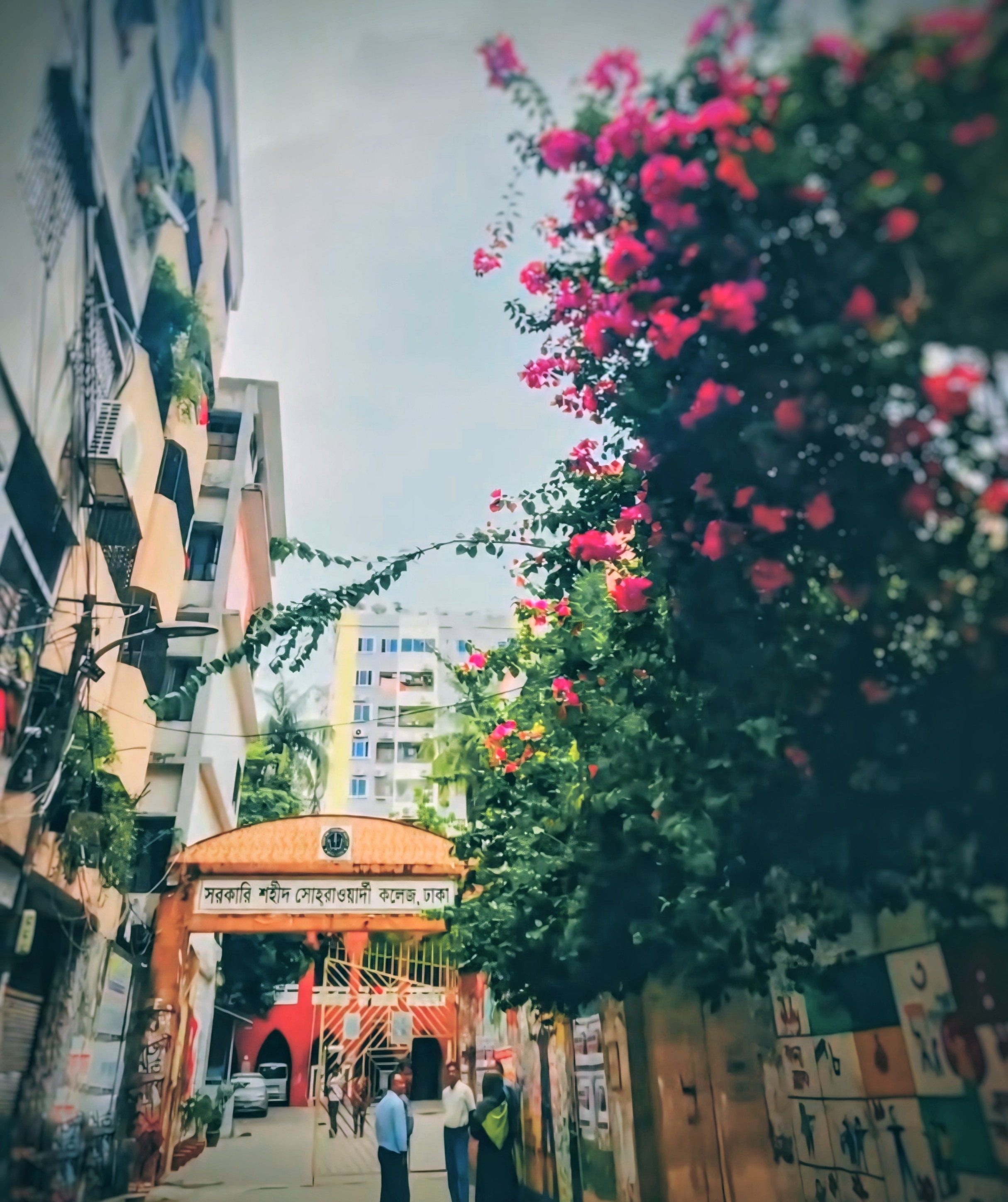
Entrance to Dhaka Central University (Suhrawardy College Campus).

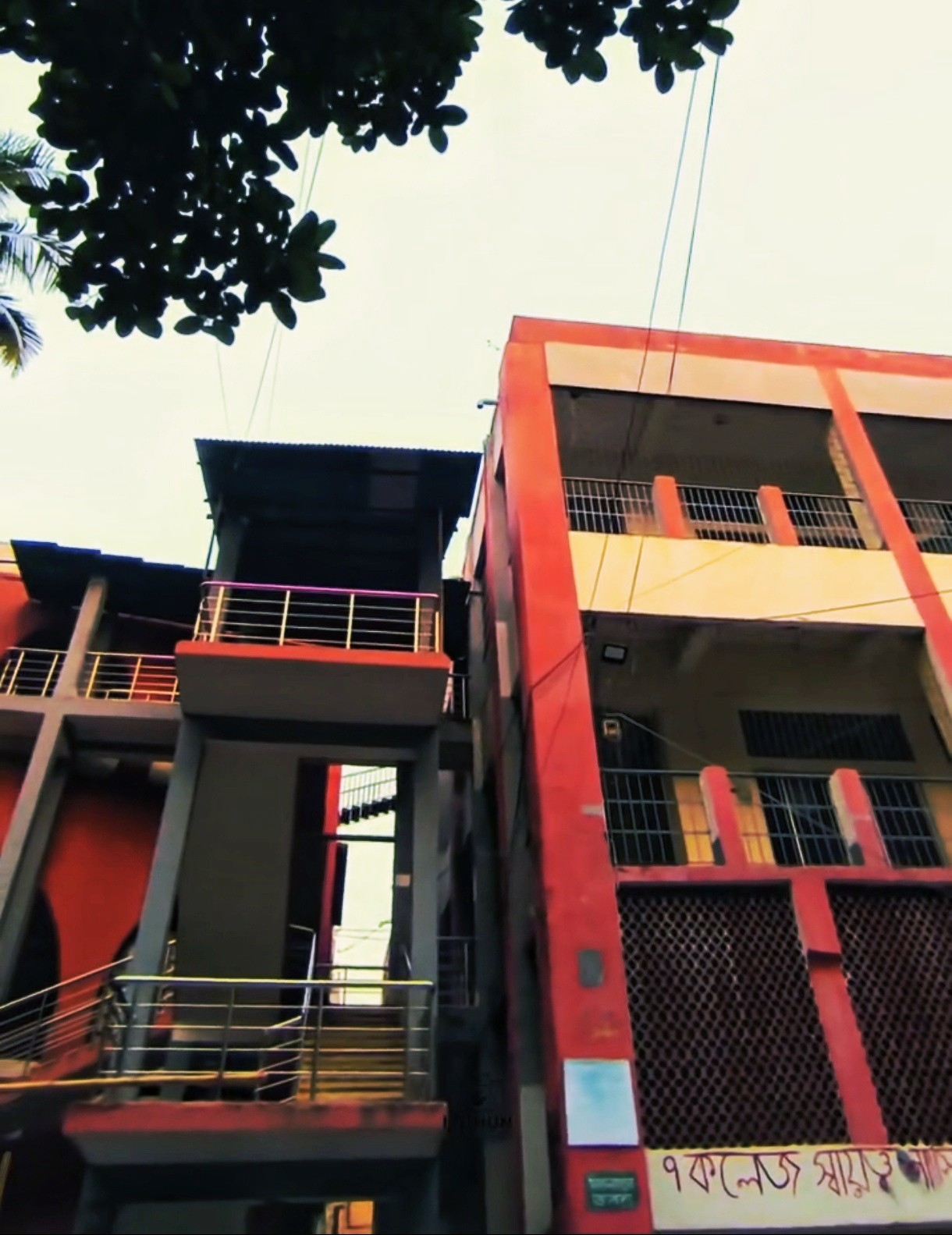
Auditorium building of Dhaka Central University (Suhrawardy College Campus).

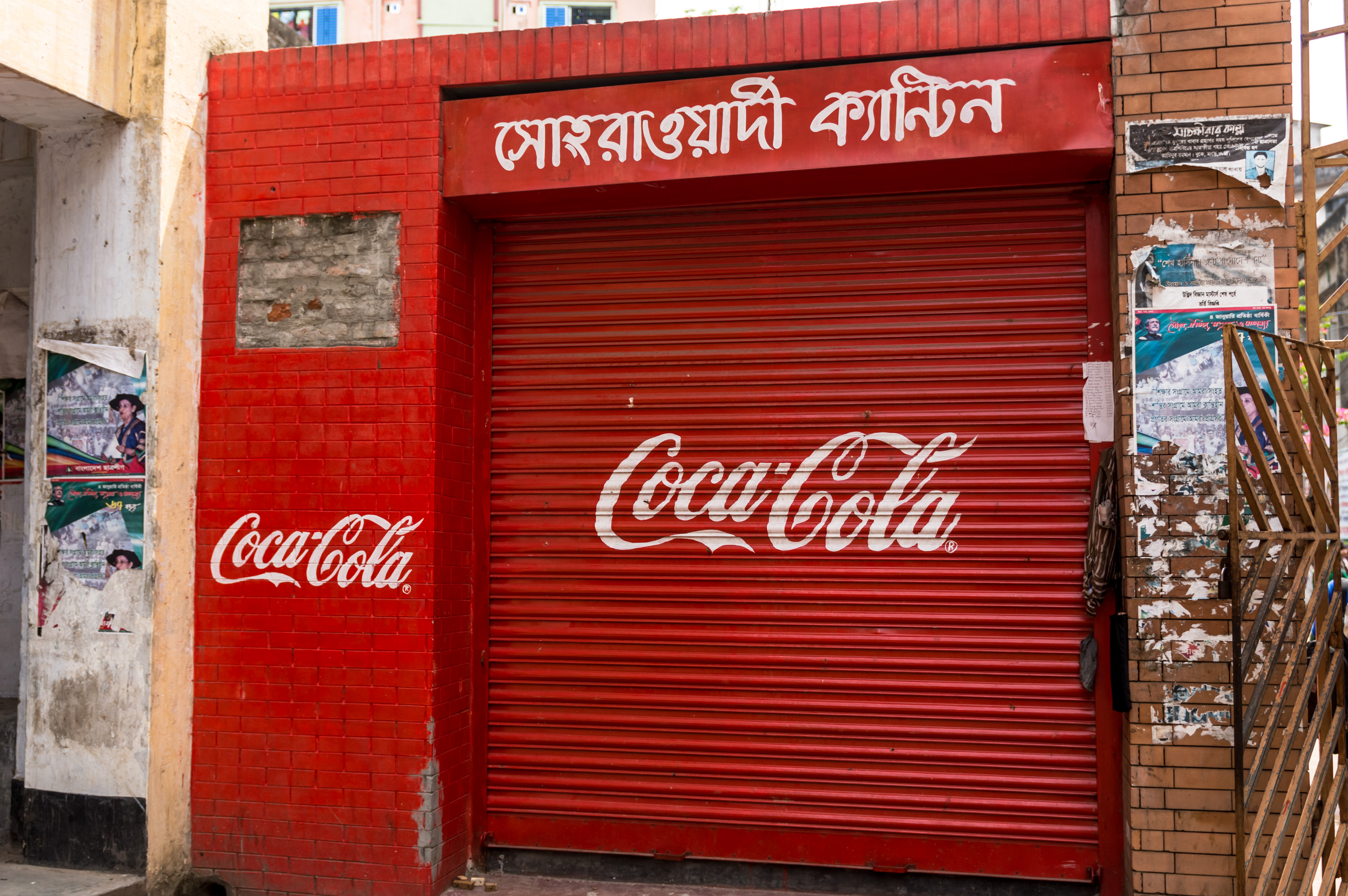
Dhaka Central University (Shaheed Suhrawardy College Campus) Canteen.

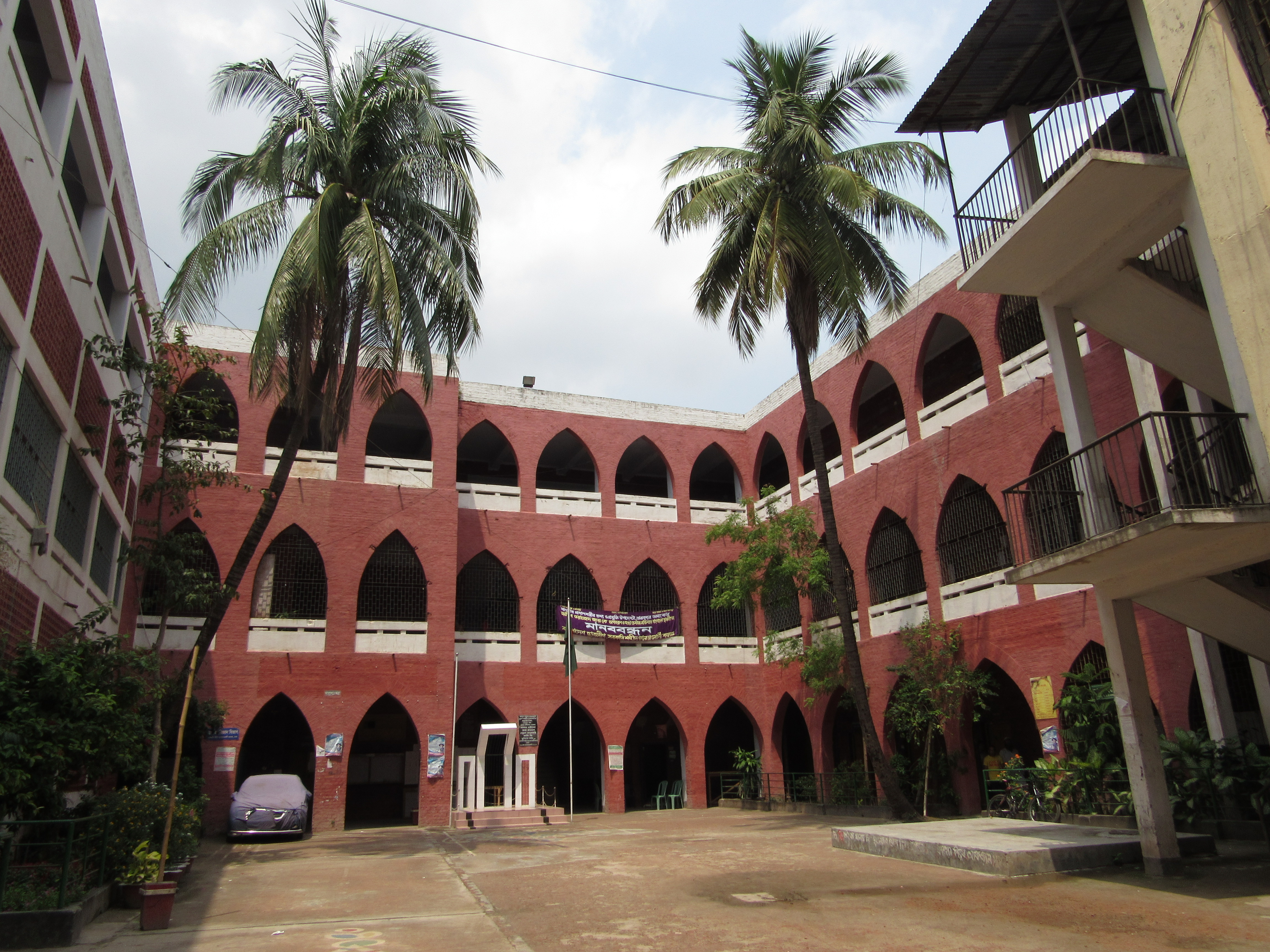
The main campus of Dhaka Central University (Suhrawardy College Campus).

== See also ==
- Education in Bangladesh
- Universities in Bangladesh
- List of universities in Bangladesh
