= Shaheed Minar (Jahangirnagar University) =

Monument in Jahangirnagar University

Coordinates: 23.7338159°N 90.3923407°E

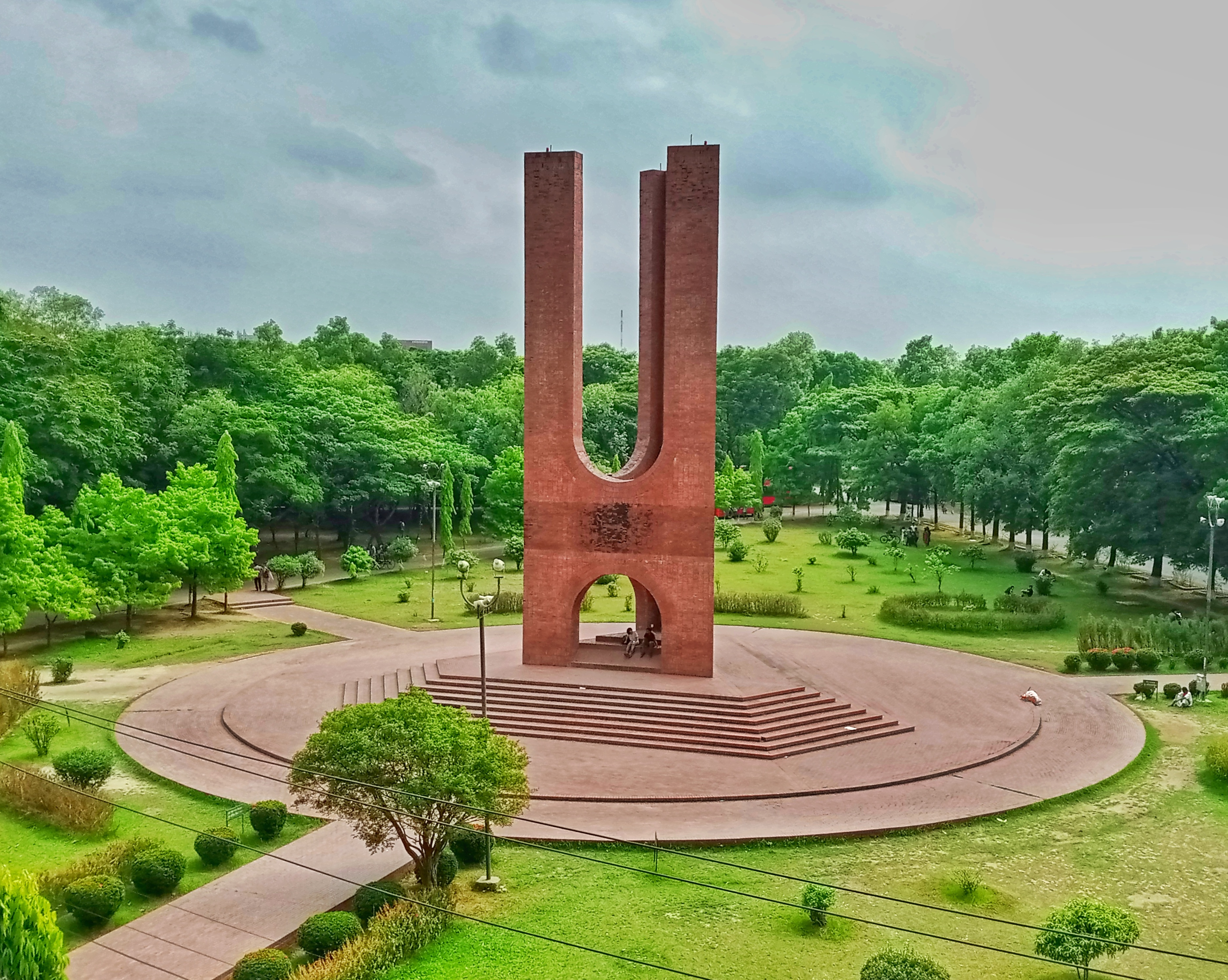
- The tallest Shaheed Minar in Bangladesh is located at Jahangirnagar University.
- Artist: Rabiul Hussain
- Year: 2008
- Subject: Bengali language movement
- Dimensions: 2,200 cm (71 ft); 1,600 cm diameter (52 ft)
- Location: Jahangirnagar University, Savar Upazila, Dhaka District, Bangladesh

The Jahangirnagar University Shaheed Minar (Bengali: জাহাঙ্গীরনগর বিশ্ববিদ্যালয় শহীদ মিনার) is a memorial monument. The Bengali Language Movement remains an enduring source of inspiration and a formative achievement in the history of Bangladesh. Embedded in that movement was the aspiration for independence, which changed the course of history and culminated in the Bangladesh Liberation War. The architectural design of Jahangirnagar University's central Shaheed Minar seeks to honour and dignify these pivotal moments in Bangladesh's national history.

== Description ==
Considering 1952 as the foundation of all achievements, the base platform has a diameter of 52 feet, and in honour of 1971, the height of the three open-sky-reaching columns above the platform is 71 feet. To pay tribute to eight years that marked Bangladesh's post-partition struggle for freedom — 1947, 1952, 1954, 1962, 1966, 1969, 1970, and 1971 — eight steps are incorporated into the base platform as a symbol of continuity. The monument's triangular, rigid-structured tower commemorates the heroic deeds of those national heroes who fought and died for the mother tongue and the homeland.

The monument was designed by architect Rabiul Hussain. It was inaugurated on 13 February 2008 by the then vice‑chancellor, Professor Dr. Khandaker Mustahidur Rahman.

== Gallery ==
=== Outside ===
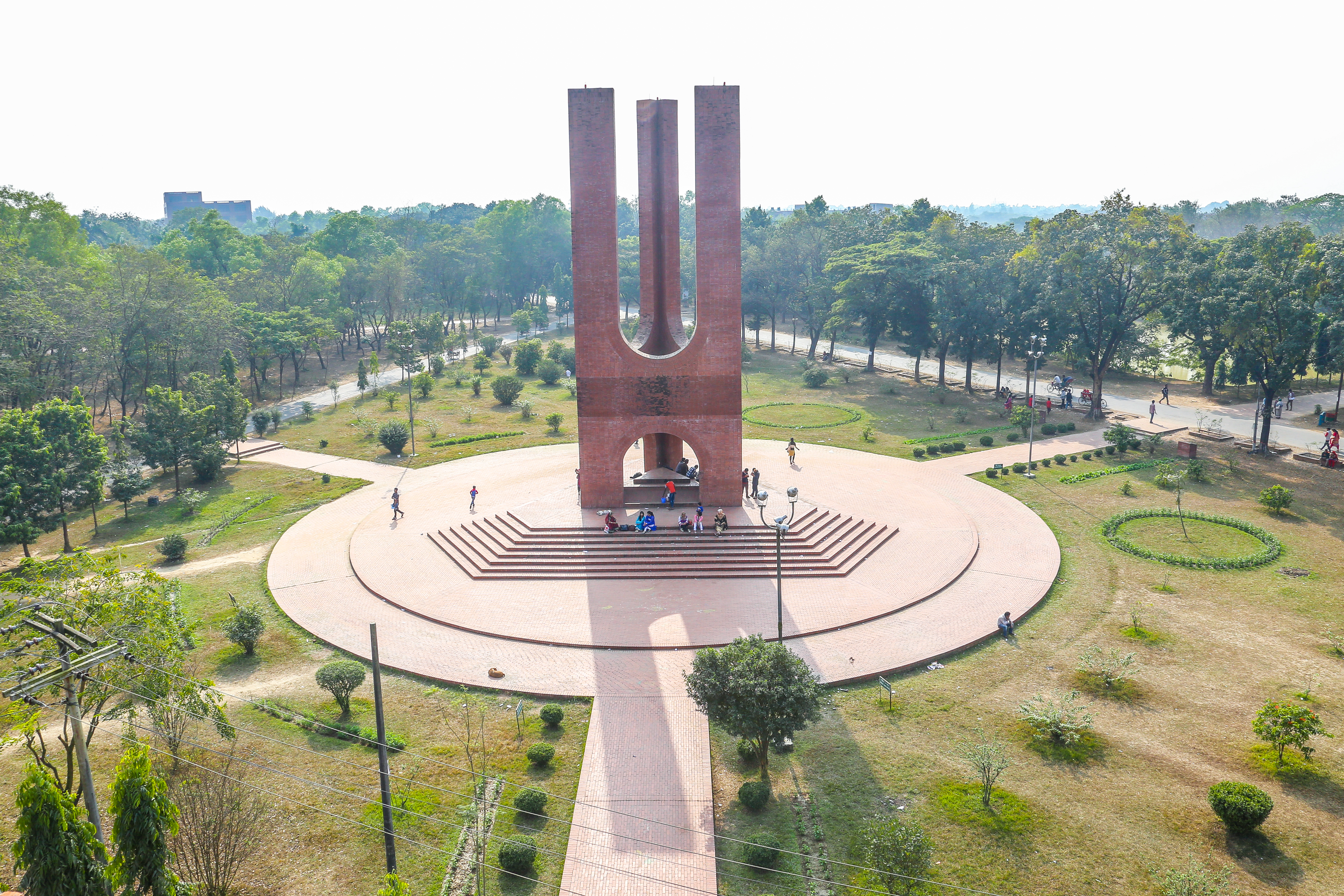

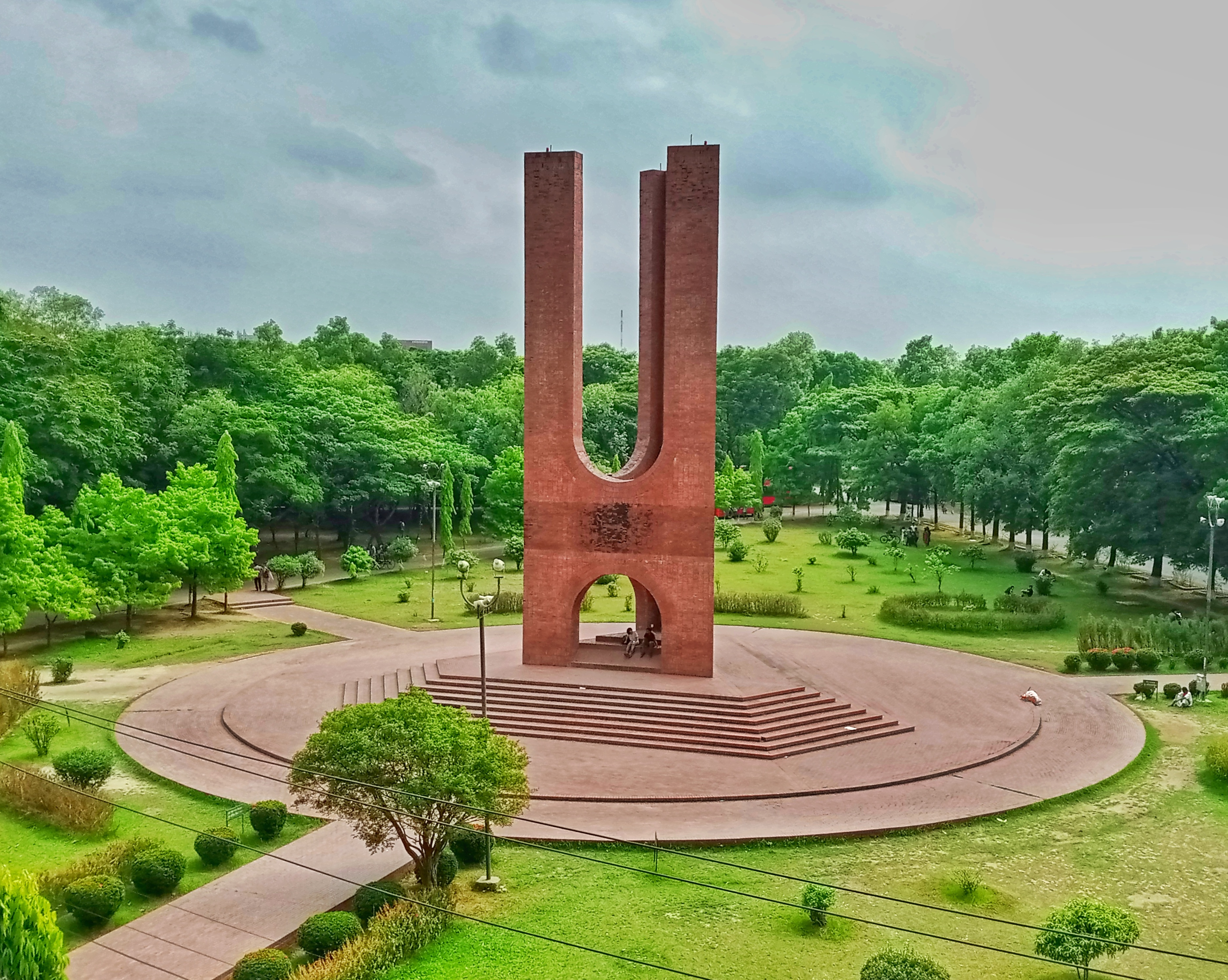

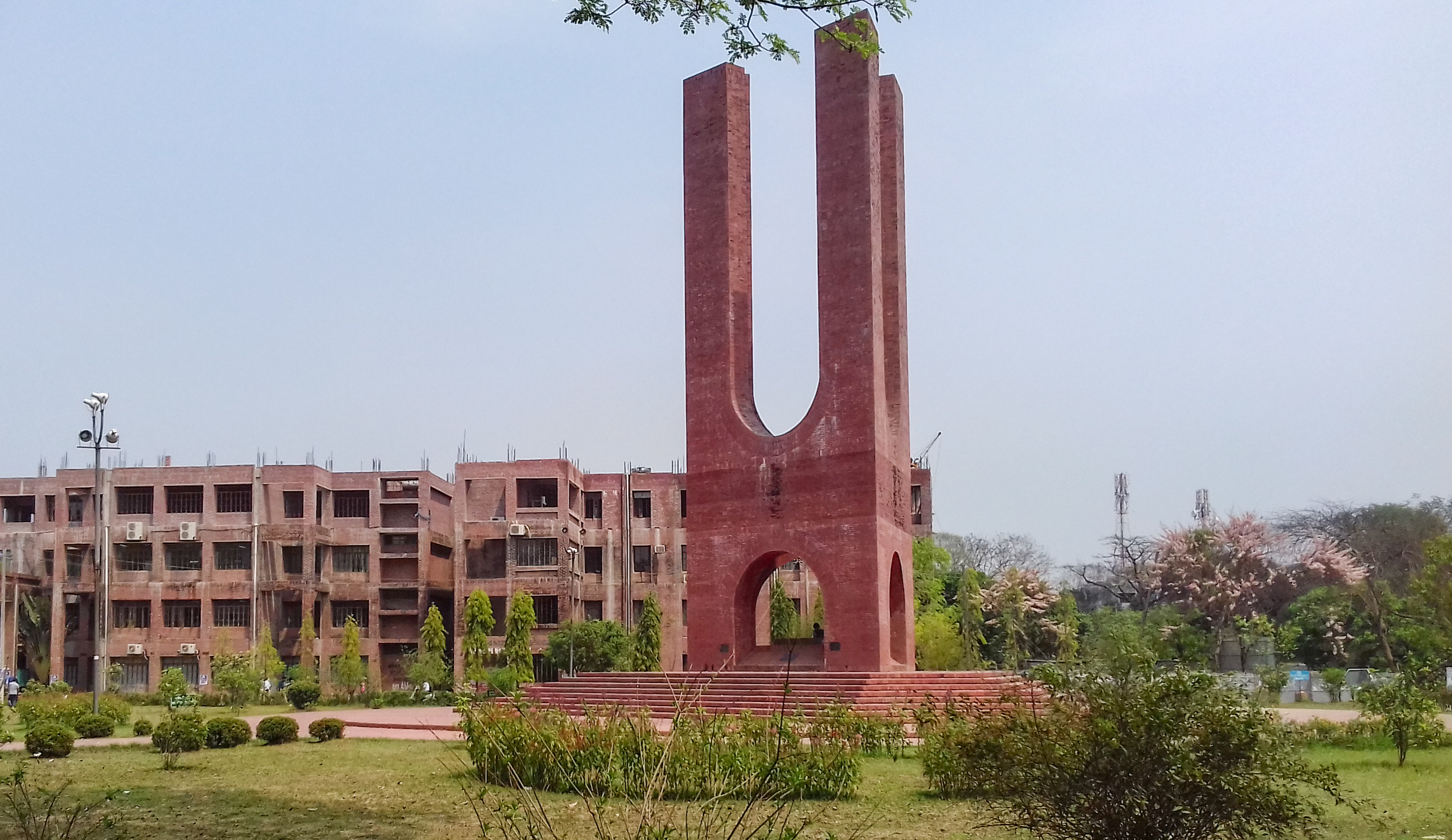

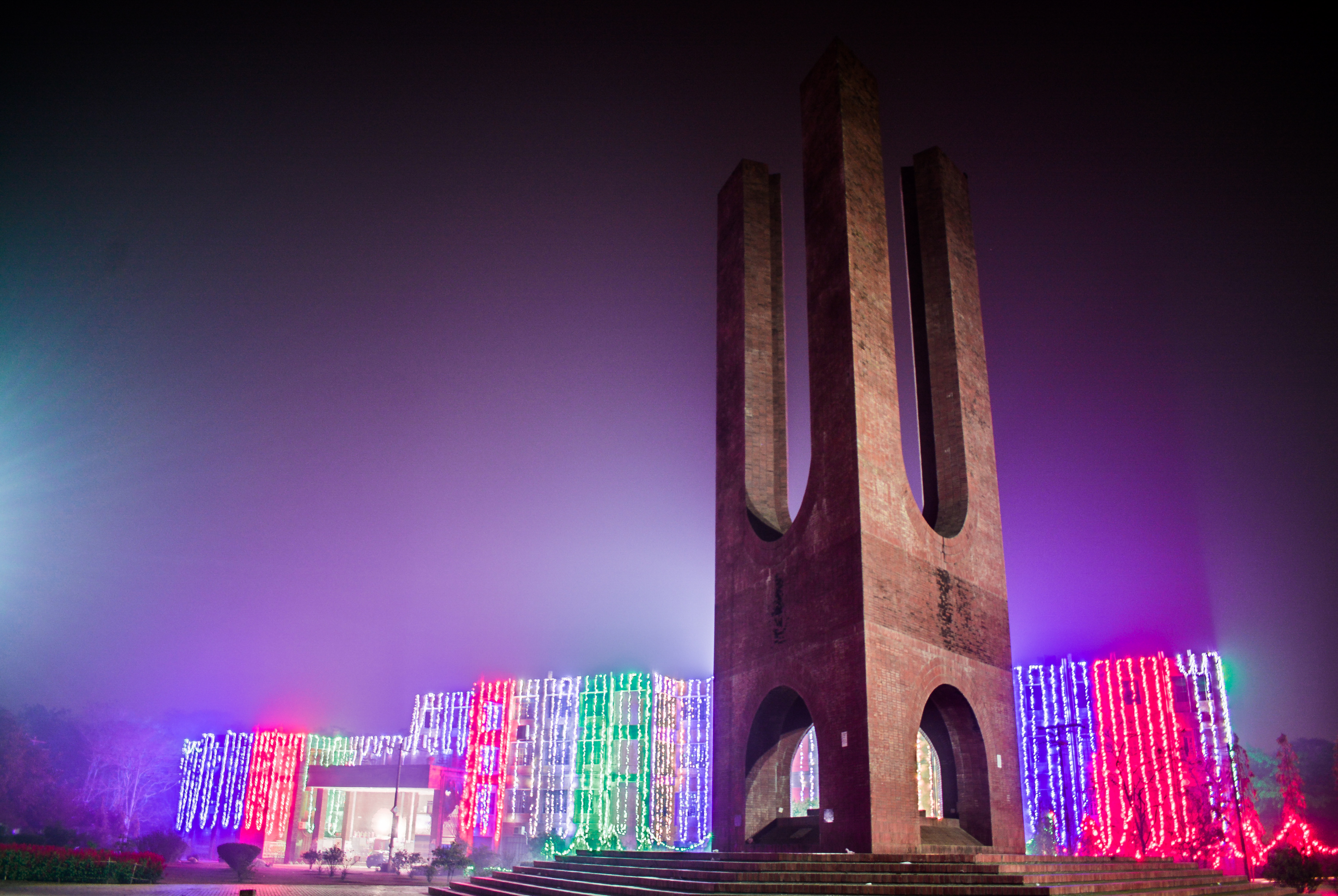

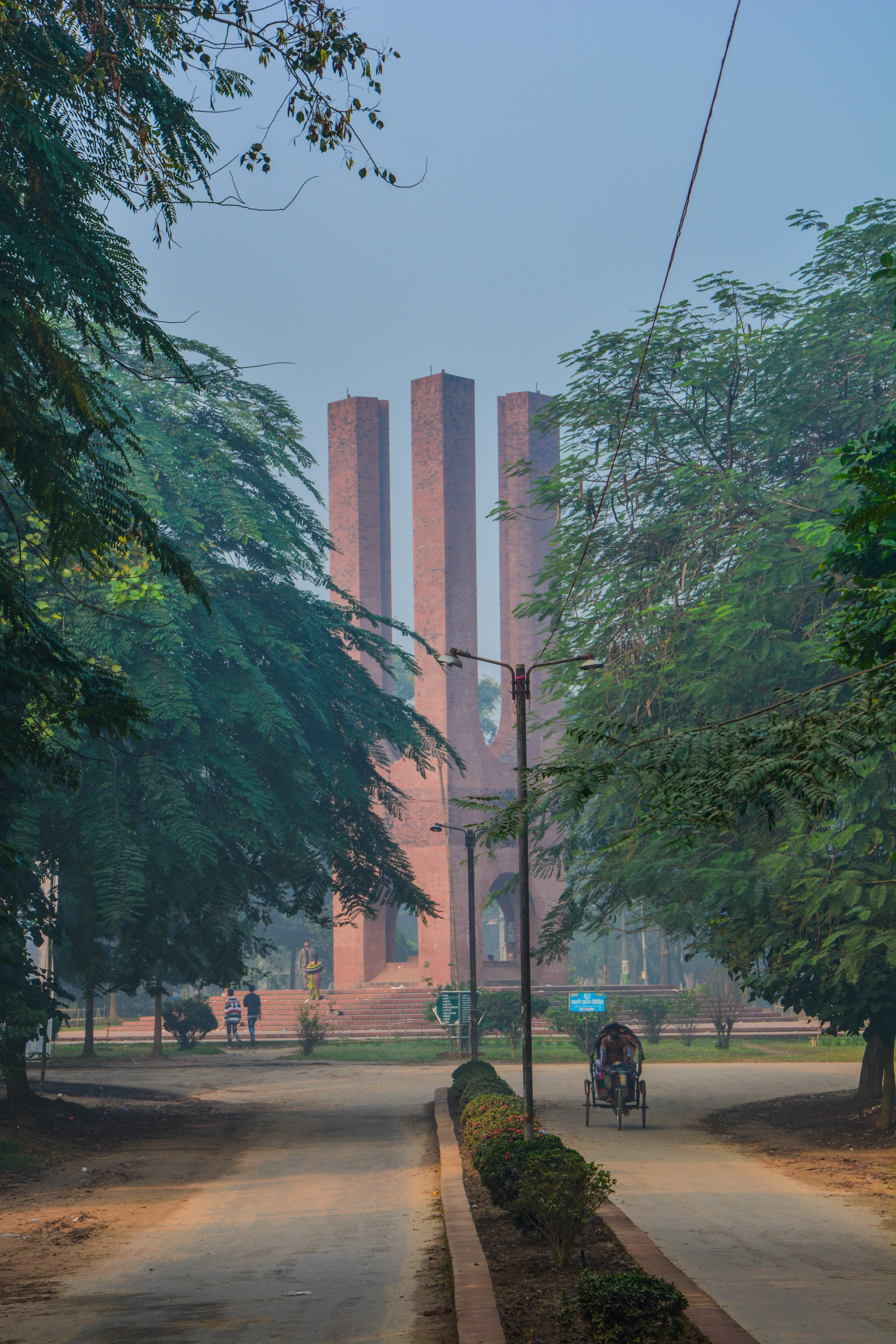

=== Inside ===
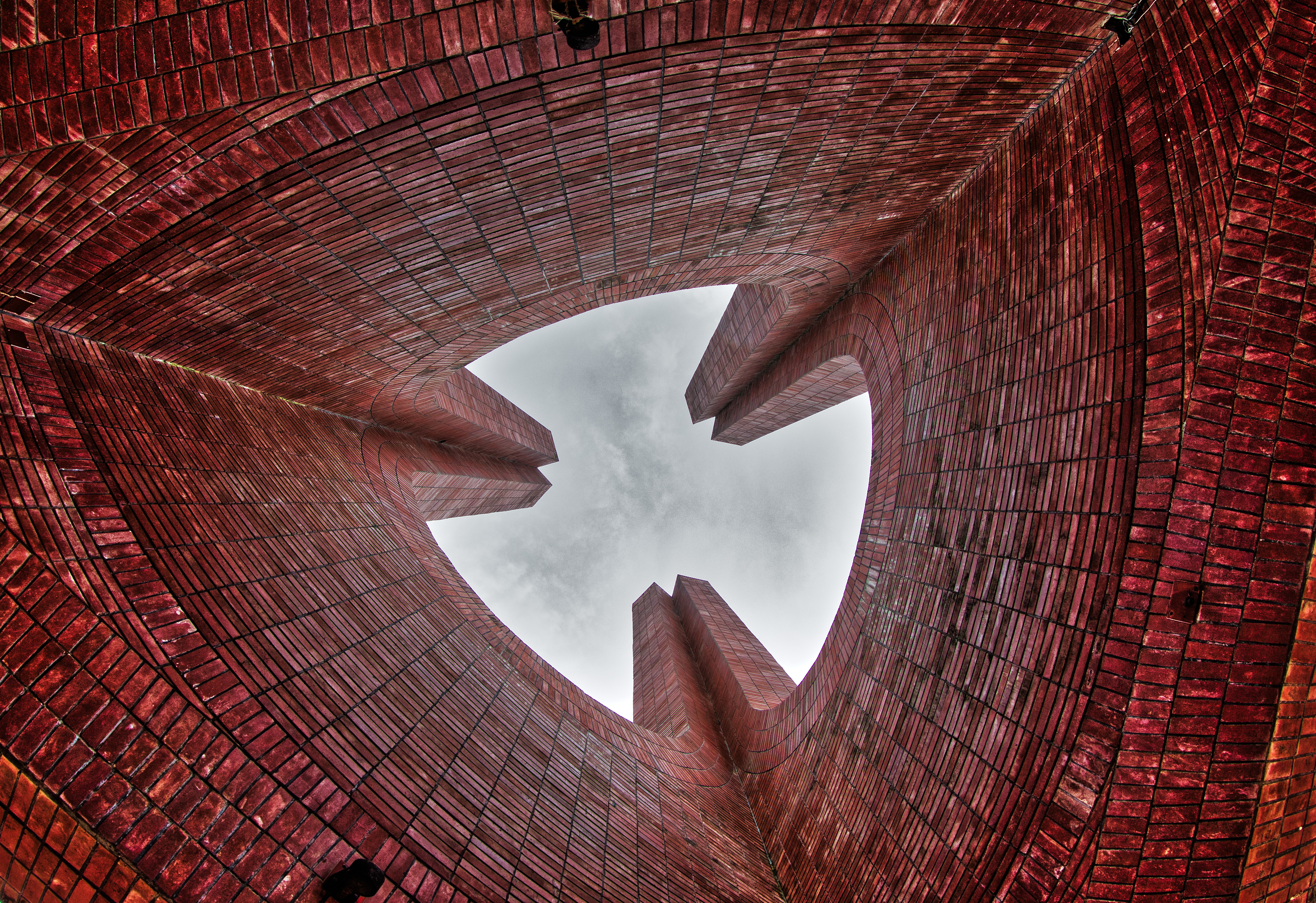

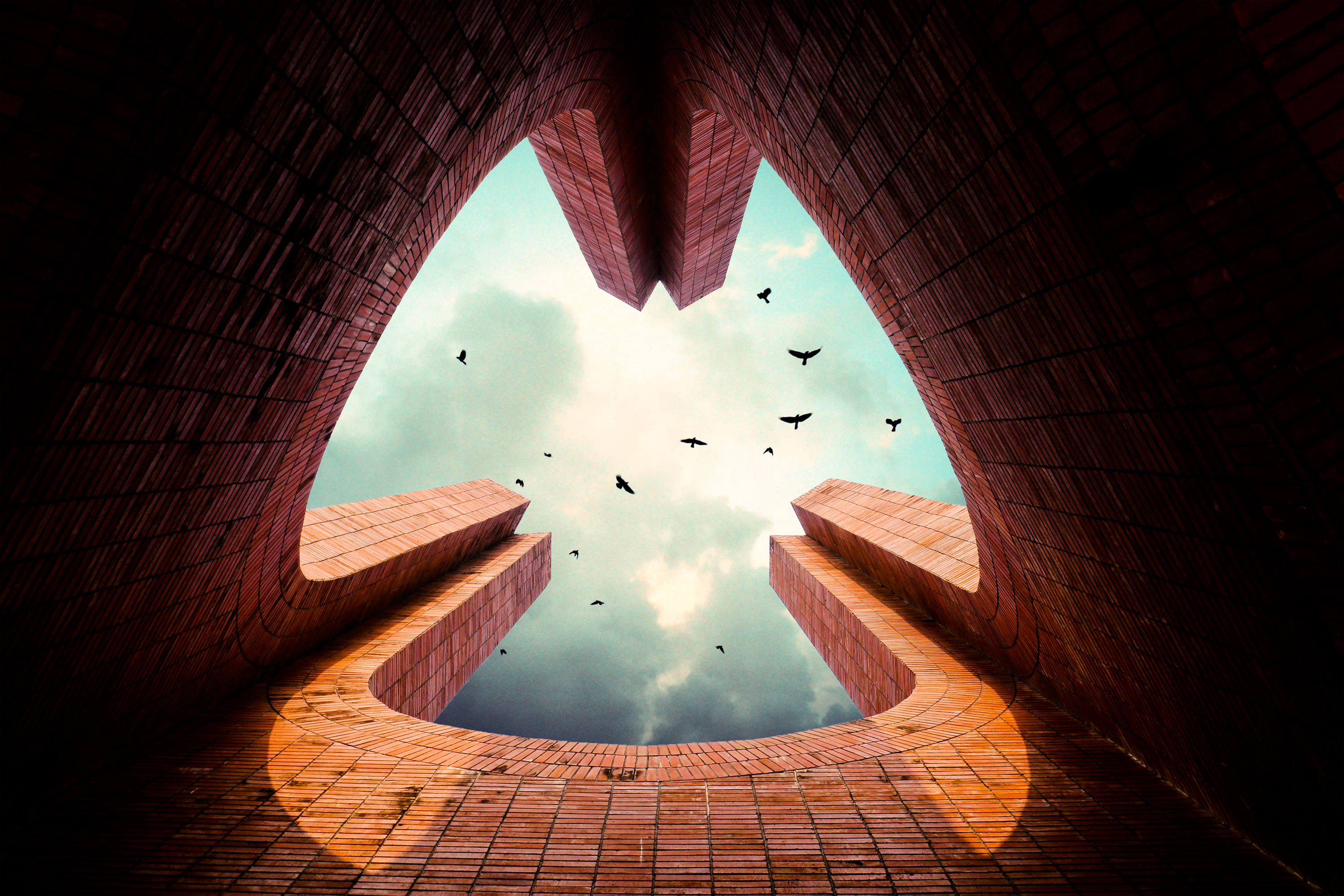

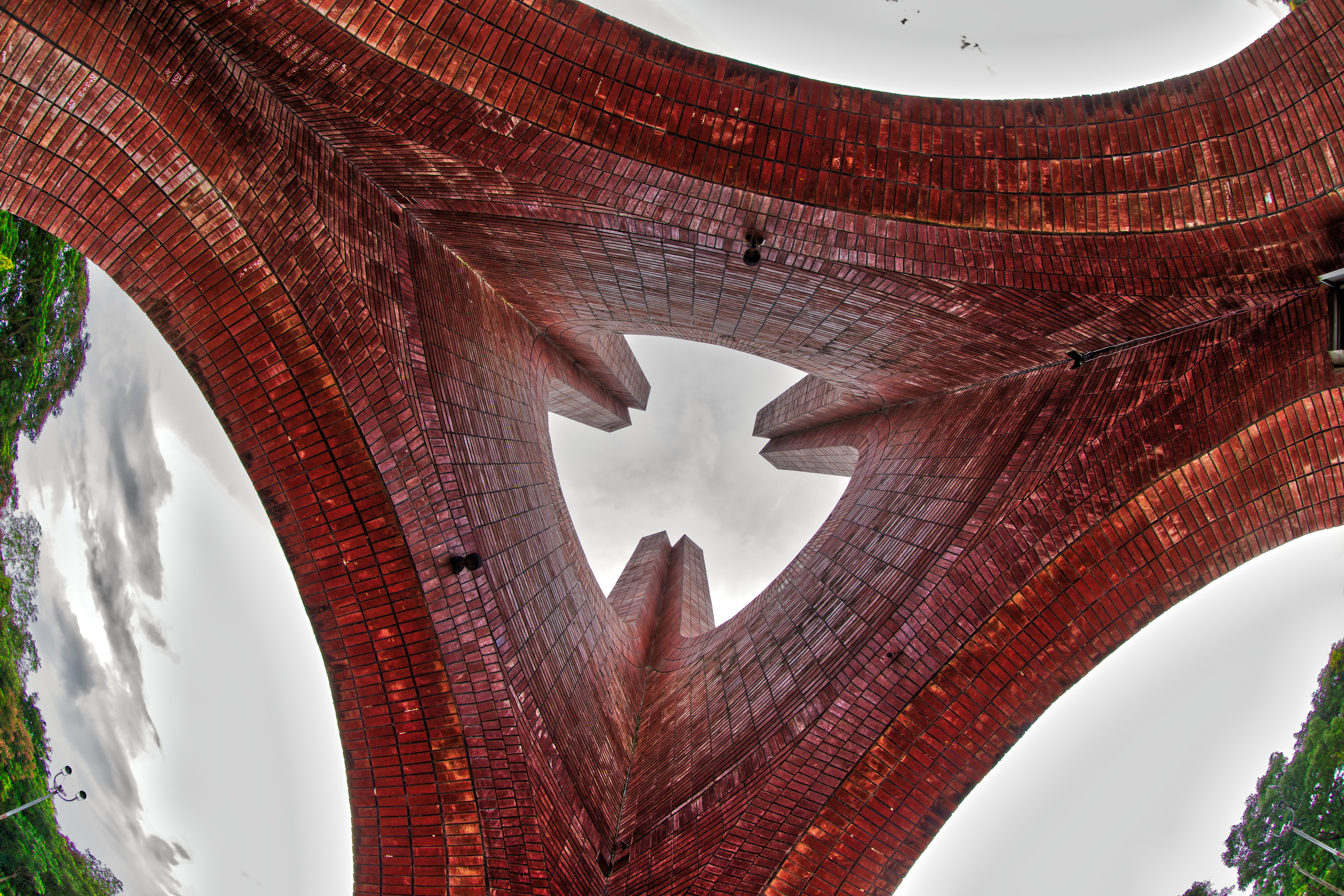

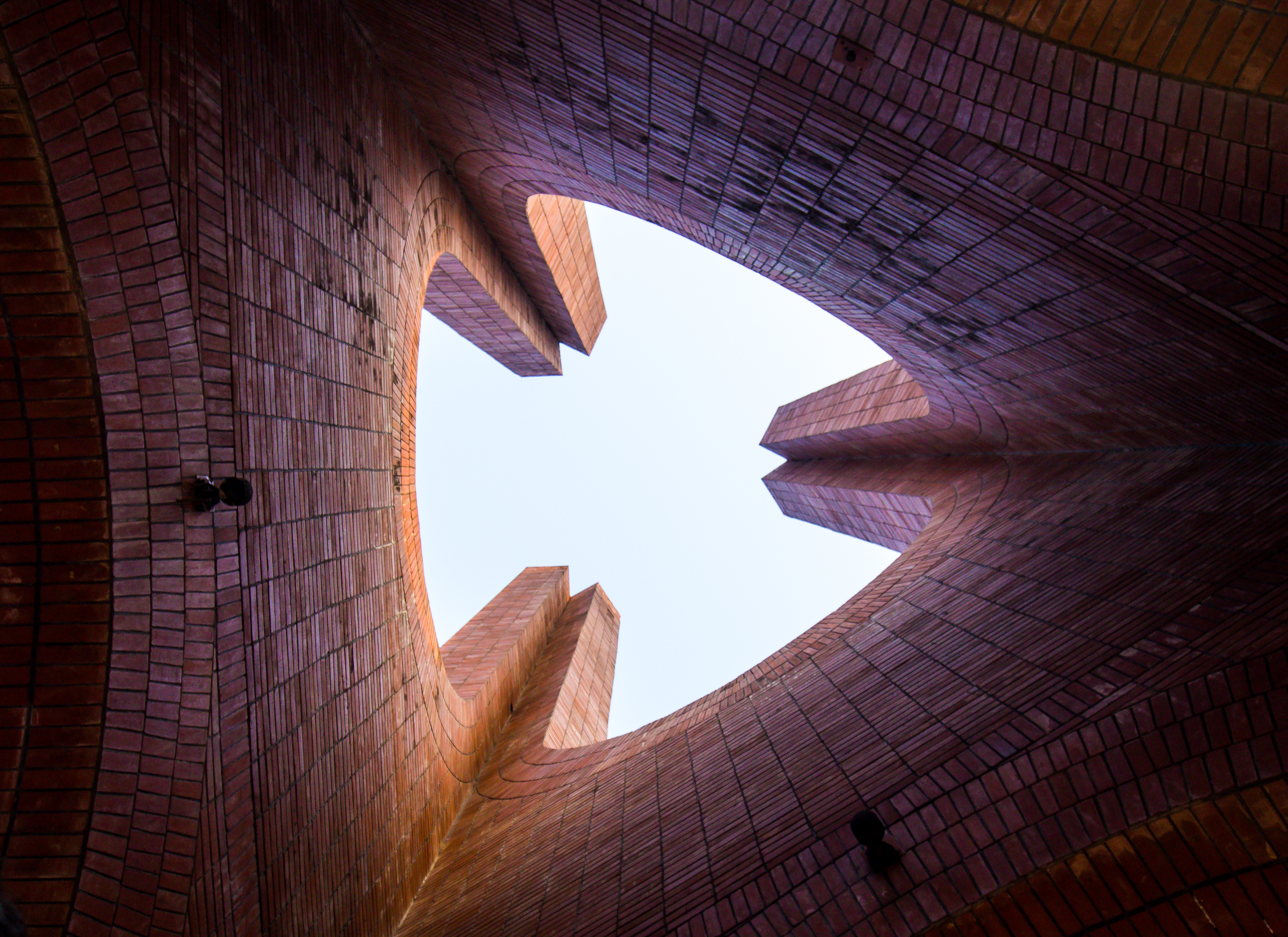

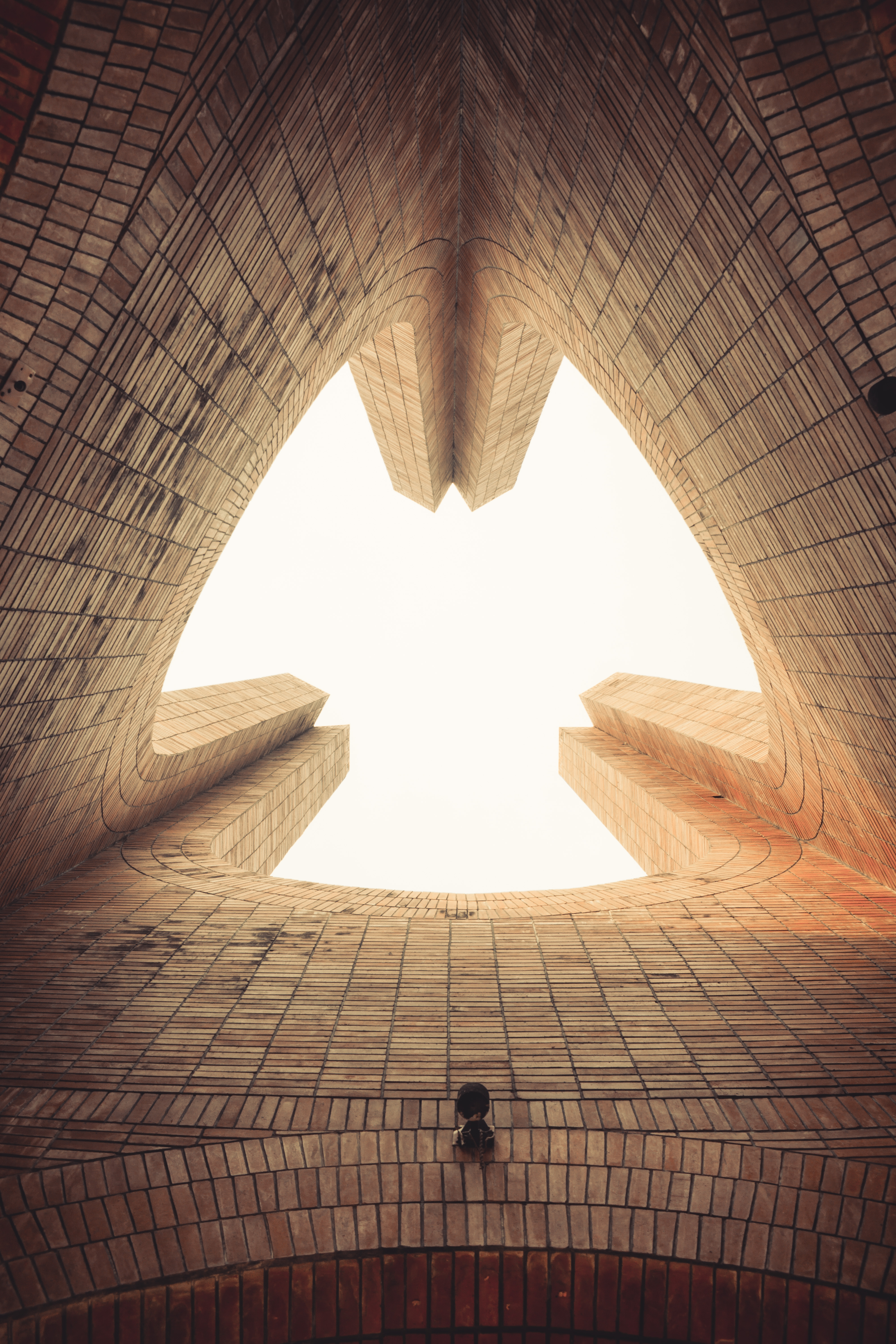
