= Jasimuddin (disambiguation) =

Jasimuddin is a Bengali masculine given name and may refer to:

- Jasimuddin (1903–1976), poet
  - Hasna Jasimuddin (born 1943), writer, environmentalist and politician
- Jasim Uddin Ahmed (1933–2022), language activist, nuclear physicist, poet and author
- Abul Khayer Jashim Uddin (1945–1998),
- Kazi Jasimuddin Ahmed Joshi (born 1963), footballer and coach
- Jashim Uddin Ahammed (born 1977), Bangladeshi politician from Chittagong
- Md Jasimuddin (born 1995), cricketer from Bandarban
- Jasim Uddin Ahmed, Vice-Chancellor of Jahangirnagar University
- Jasimuddin Rahmani, chief of Ansarullah Bangla Team, an affiliate of Al-Qaeda in Bangladesh
- Mohammad Jashimuddin (politician), Bangladeshi politician and a former Jatiya Sangsad member from Bhola-3
- Md. Jashim Uddin, Bangladeshi diplomat
- Gazi Jasim Uddin, chief of the Industrial Police

== See also ==
- Jasim
