= Jahangirnagar University =

Public university in Bangladesh

- জাহাঙ্গীরনগর বিশ্ববিদ্যালয়
- Logo of Jahangirnagar University
- Former name: Jahangirnagar Muslim University (1971-1973)
- Type: Public, research university
- Established: 20 August 1970; 56 years ago (formally launched in 12 January 1971; 55 years ago)
- Accreditation: UGC; PCB
- Budget: ৳348.70 crore (US$28 million) (2026-27)
- Chancellor: President Mirza Fakhrul Islam Alamgir
- Vice-Chancellor: Md. Nurul Islam
- Pro Vice-Chancellor (Academic): M Mahfuzur Rahman
- Academic staff: 836 (2019) professorial faculty
- Administrative staff: 2,018 (2018)
- Students: 17,212 (2019)
- Undergraduates: 10,788 (2018)
- Postgraduates: 2,235 (2018)
- Doctoral students: 1,962 (2018)
- Location: Pathalia Union, Savar Upazila, Dhaka District, Bangladesh; 23.8824°N 90.2671°E
- Campus: 697.56 acres (2.8 km^{2}); Suburban
- Colors: Peacock blue
- Mascot: Lotus 🪷
- Website: www.juniv.edu

University rankings

Global – Overall
- QS World: 1401+ (2027)
- THE World: 801-1000 (2026)
- USNWR Global: 1238 (2026-2027)

Global – Liberal arts
- THE Social Sciences: 801-1000 (2026)

Global – Life sciences and medicine
- THE Life Sciences: 601-800 (2026)

Global – Science and engineering
- THE Computer Science: 401-500 (2026)
- THE Physical Sciences: 801-1000 (2026)

Regional – Overall
- QS Asia: 304 (2026)
- THE Asia: 351-400 (2025)

Jahangirnagar University (Bengali: জাহাঙ্গীরনগর বিশ্ববিদ্যালয়, abbreviated as JU; initially started as Jahangirnagar Muslim University; Bengali: জাহাঙ্গীরনগর মুসলিম বিশ্ববিদ্যালয়) is a fully residential public research university located in Savar, Dhaka, Bangladesh. As one of the five autonomous universities in the country, it is the fourth-oldest generalized public university and the fourth-largest university in Bangladesh.

Jahangirnagar University was established in East Pakistan by The Jahangirnagar Muslim University Ordinance, 1970 of the Government of Pakistan, which was amended by The Jahangirnagar Muslim University Act, 1973 of the government of independent Bangladesh to form the modern university.

Jahangirnagar University offers undergraduate, graduate and doctoral programs in various disciplines, including arts, humanities, social science, natural science, biological science, business studies, law and engineering. It has produced several notable alumni who have contributed to the development of research, literature, education, culture and sports in Bangladesh. Jahangirnagar University is the sole fully residential university in Bangladesh, and is also renowned for the varied wildlife inhabiting its vast campus, hosting 126 species of native birds alongside 69 species of migratory birds.

The university has 36 departments under 6 faculties including the faculty of mathematical and physical sciences, faculty of social sciences, faculty of arts and humanities, faculty of biological sciences, and faculty of business administration and faculty of law and justice. It has several academic and research institutes including institute of Information technology, institute of Remote sensing and GIS, institute of Business administration, institute of Comparative literature and culture, Wazed Miah science research center, Wildlife conservation and research center, and Butterfly park and research center.

== History ==
Jahangirnagar was the former name of Dhaka. The Mughal city of Dhaka was named Jahangirnagar (City of Jahangir) in honour of the erstwhile ruling Mughal Emperor Jahangir by Islam Khan in 1610.

Jahangirnagar University was established on 20 August 1970, but formally launched on 12 January 1971 under the Jahangirnagar Muslim University Ordinance, 1970 and this day is observed as University Day. Initially, it was named Jahangirnagar Muslim University, and the plan was to operate the university like Aligarh Muslim University. But after the independence of Bangladesh, its name changed to Jahangirnagar University under the Jahangirnagar University Act' 1973.

Its first vice-chancellor, Mafizuddin Ahmed (PhD in chemistry, Penn State) took up office on 24 September 1970. The 150 students in the first batch were enrolled in four departments: Economics, Geography, Mathematics, and Statistics. Its formal inauguration was delayed until 12 January 1971, when the university was launched by Rear Admiral S. M. Ahsan, the chancellor.

Its first project Director was Surat Ali Khan, Chemistry PhD/DIC from the Imperial College of London. He was a champion of women's education, as he himself had four daughters who led successful careers. He envisioned dormitories for women allowing them the same facilities as their male classmates. Khan went on to serve as the Educational and Cultural Attaché from the Bangladeshi/ East Pakistani Government to the United States Government in Washington DC.

=== Jahangirnagar University Act of 1973 ===
ACT NO. XXXIV OF 1973, an act to repeal the Jahangirnagar Muslim University Ordinance, 1970 and to provide for reconstitution and reorganisation of the Jahangirnagar Muslim University.

== Campus ==
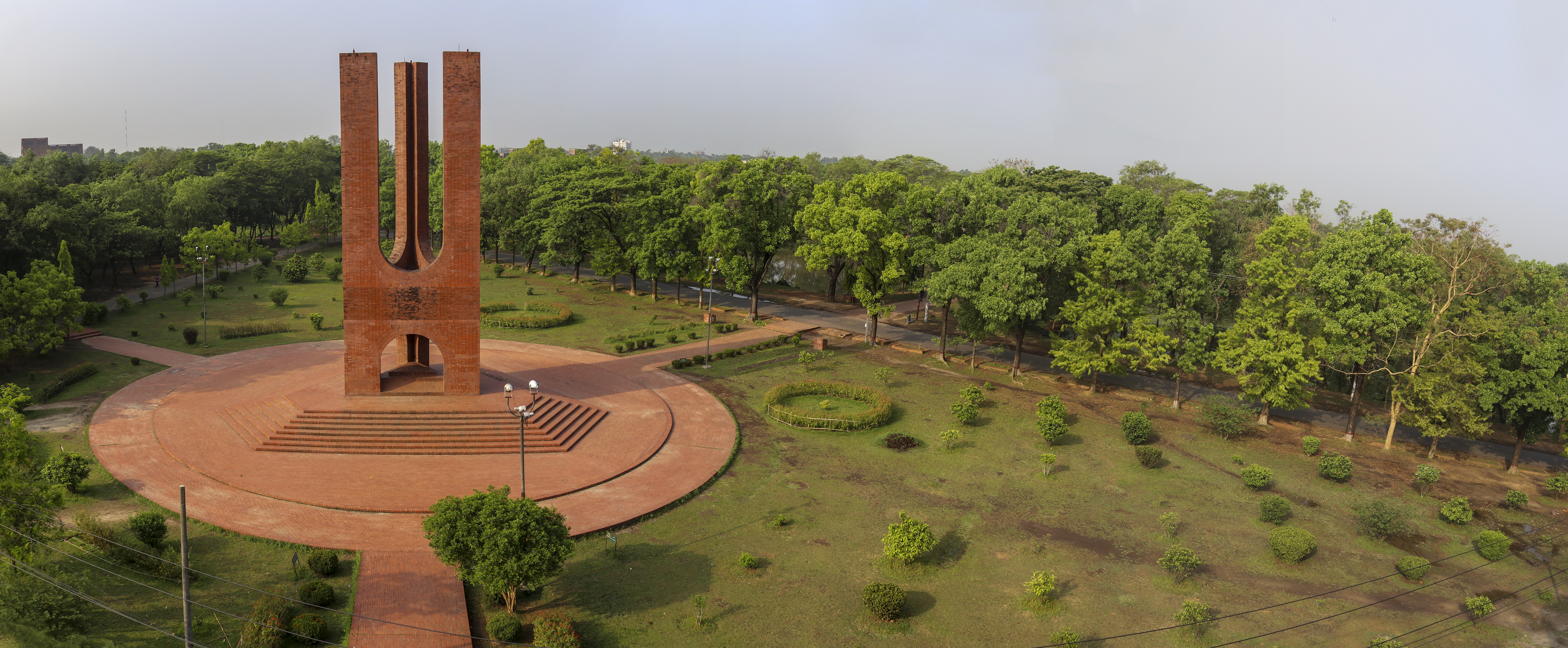
The Shaheed Minar of Jahangirnagar University is the tallest Shaheed Minar in Bangladesh

The university stands on the west side of the Asian Highway, popularly known as the Dhaka–Aricha highway, and is 32 kilometres away from the capital. Spread over an area of 697.56 acres (2.8 km^{2}), the campus is surrounded by the Bangladesh Public Administration Training Centre (BPATC) on the south, and the Savar Cantonment on the northeast, on the north of which is the National Monument (Jatiyo Smriti Soudho) and a large dairy farm on the east. JU is considered to have one of the most beautiful campus in Bangladesh. The topography of the land with its gentle rise and plains is pleasing to the eyes. The water features sprawled around the campus make an excellent habitat for the winter birds that flock in every year in the thousands and consequently, it is a site frequented by many bird watchers. On 19 January 2017, the university arranged a bird fair in its Zahir Rayhan auditorium. The Shahid Minar (martyrs' monument) of JU is the tallest in Bangladesh, 71 feet high and made of ceramic bricks on a base 52 feet in circumference. The height signifies the war of independence fought in 1971 and the circumference refers to the language movement of 1952. It is designed by architect Robiul Hossain.

== Administration ==
The university is an autonomous body managed by an executive council known as 'The Syndicate'. Its statutes need ratification by the university senate, which meets at least once a year to do the same. The Senate passes the university's annual budget, reviews its academic matters, and elects a panel of three nominees for the position of its vice-chancellor once every four years. The selection and appointment are made by the president of Bangladesh, who is the chancellor of the university. The chancellor also appoints the pro-vice-chancellor and the treasurer of the university.

=== List of vice-chancellors ===
The first vice chancellor, Mafizuddin Ahmed, was appointed in 1970.

Name	Duration
Mafizuddin Ahmed	(1970–1972)
Syed Ali Ahsan	(1972–1975)
Muhammad Enamul Haq	(1975–1976)
Zillur Rahman Siddiqui	(1976–1984) Kamal Uddin Ahmed [educationist] (1984 - 1988)
Mohammad Noman	(1988)
Kazi Saleh Ahmed	(1988–1993)
Amirul Islam Chowdhury	(1993–1994)
Alauddin Ahammad	(1998–1999)
Abdul Bayes	(1999–2001)
Jasim Uddin Ahmed	(2001–2004)
Khondokar Mustahidur Rahman (d. 2021)	(2004–2007)
Muhammad Muniruzzaman	(2009)
Shariff Enamul Kabir	(2010–2012)
M. Anwar Hossain	(2012–2014)
M A Matin	(23 January 2014 – 2 March 2014)
Farzana Islam	(2014–2022)
Md Nurul Alam	(13 September 2022 – 7 August 2024)
Mohammad Kamrul Ahsan	(8 September 2024 – 26 September 2026)
Md. Nurul Islam	(26 September 2026 - Present)

== Academics ==
Jahangirnagar University is the only university in Bangladesh that preserves about 50% of the total seats for female students.

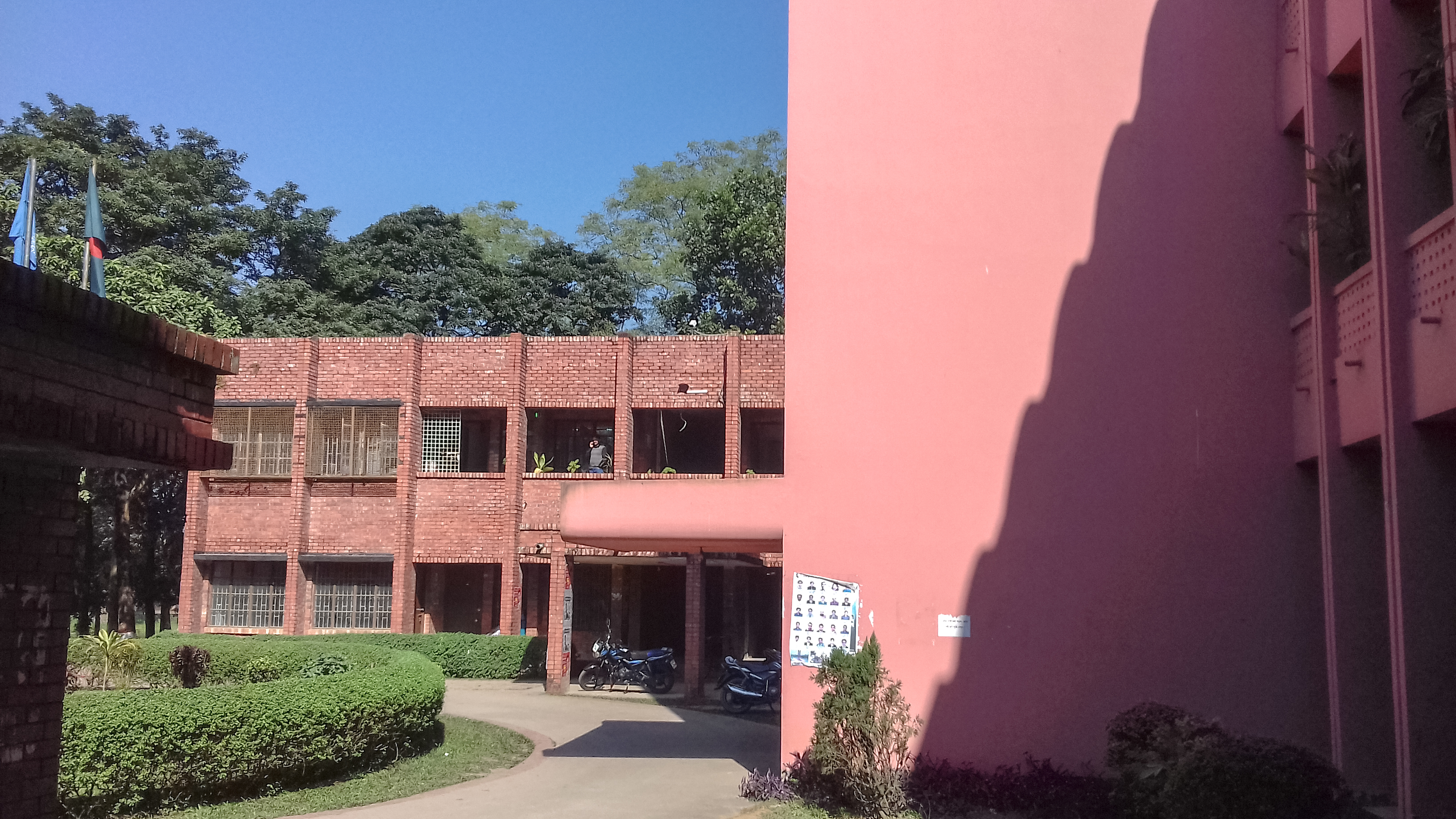
Administrative Building

=== Faculties ===
There are 36 departments under six faculties.

==== Faculty of Mathematical and Physical Sciences ====
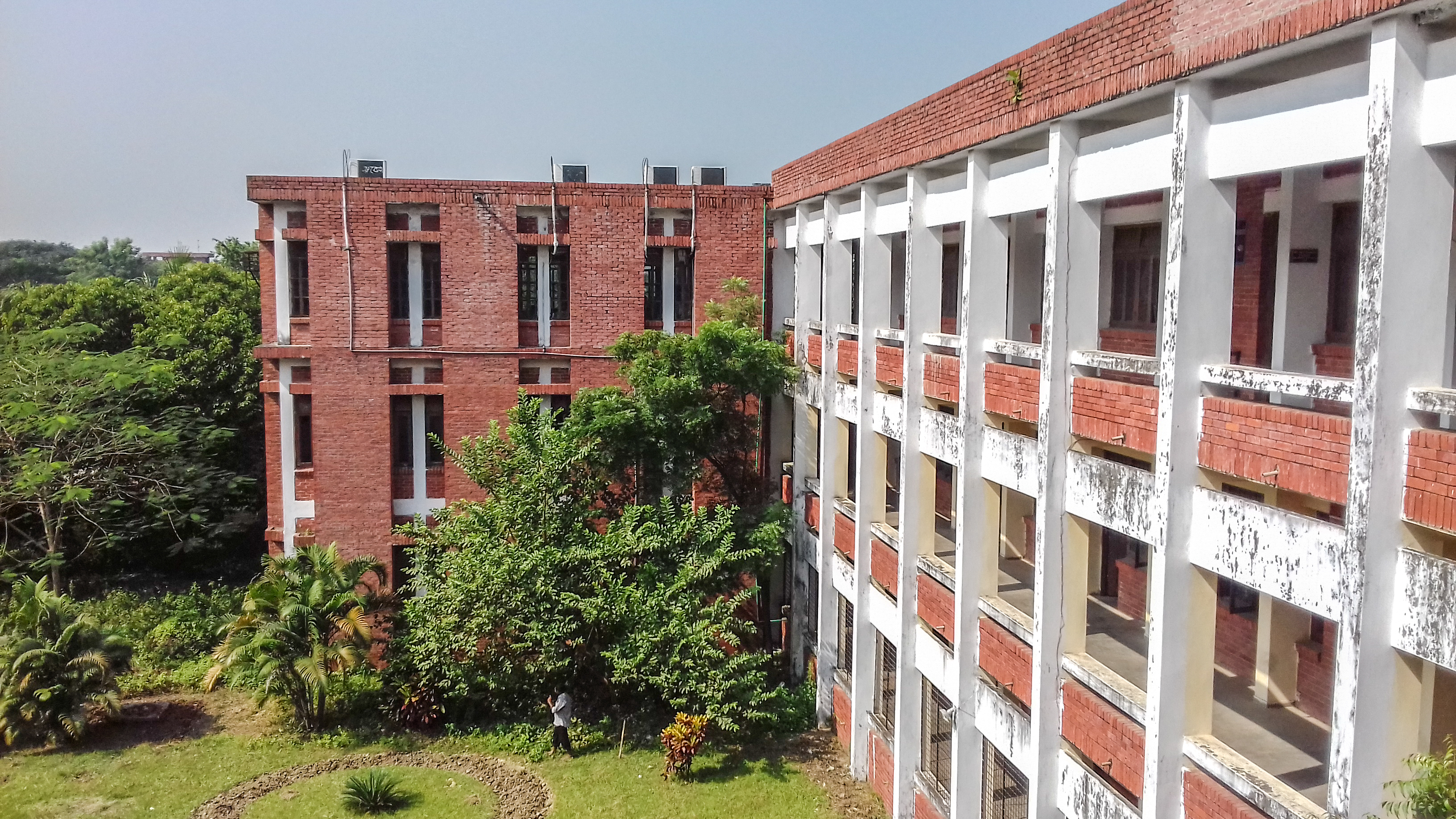
Department of Physics

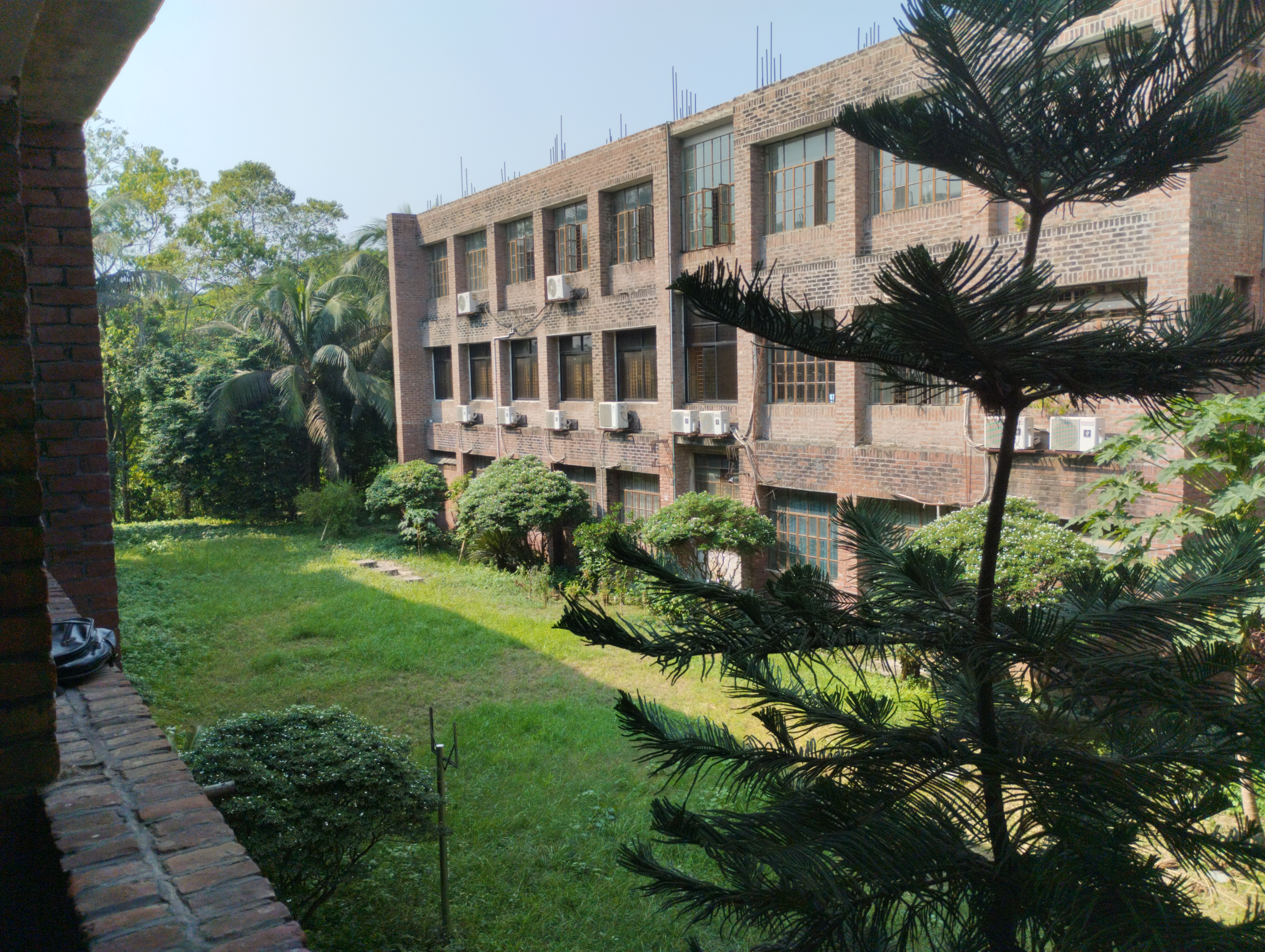
Department of CSE

Dean: Farid Ahmed

- Department of Chemistry
- Department of Computer Science and Engineering
- Department of Environmental Sciences
- Department of Geological Sciences
- Department of Mathematics
- Department of Physics
- Department of Statistics and Data Science

==== Faculty of Social Sciences ====
Dean: Bashir Ahmed

- Department of Anthropology
- Department of Economics
- Department of Geography and Environment
- Department of Government and Politics
- Department of Public Administration
- Department of Urban and Regional Planning

==== Faculty of Arts and Humanities ====
Dean: Md. Mozammel Hoque

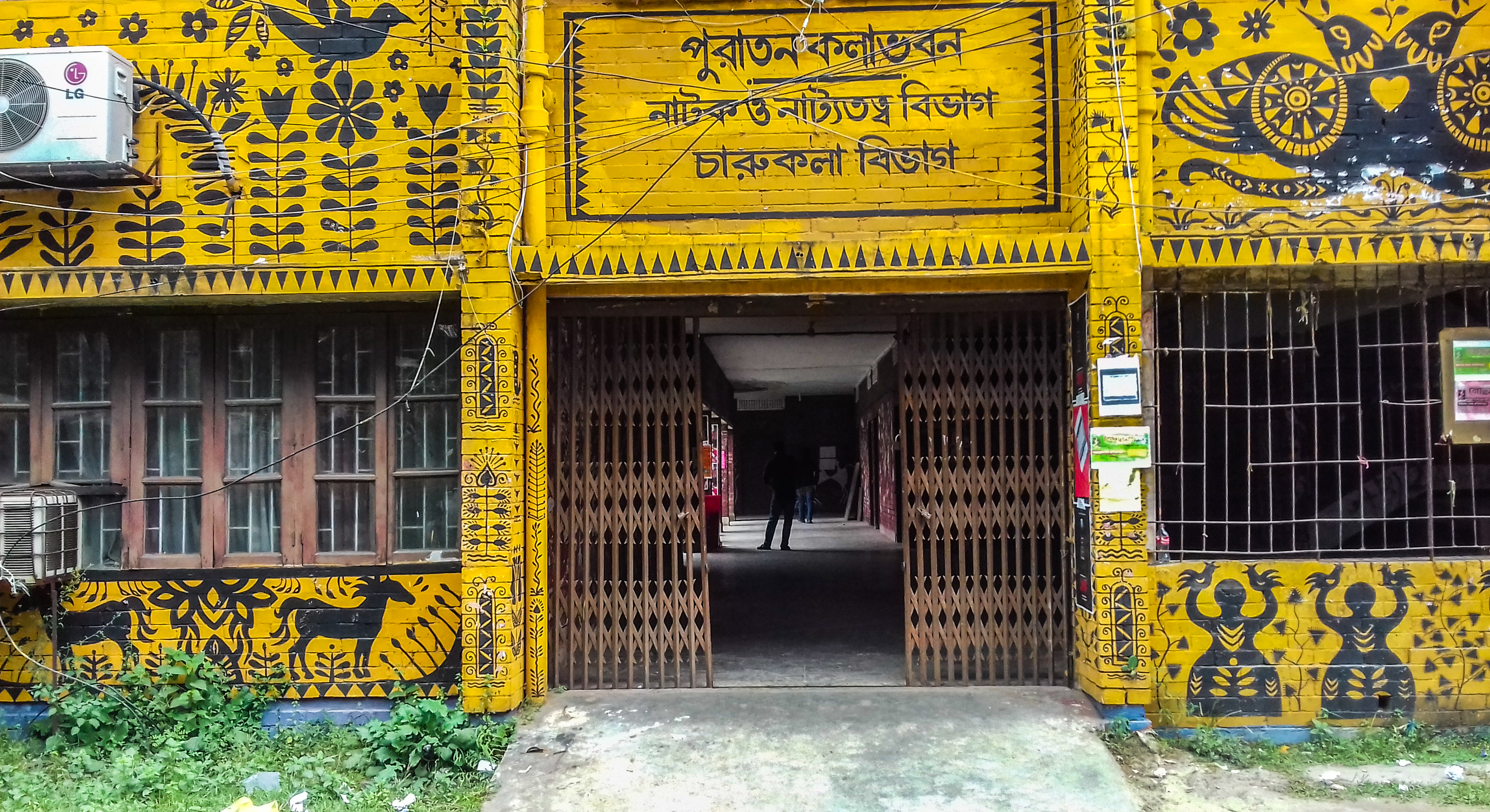
Department of Drama and Dramatics

- Department of Archaeology
- Department of Bangla
- Department of English
- Department of Drama and Dramatics
- Department of Fine Arts
- Department of History
- Department of International Relations
- Department of Journalism and Media Studies
- Department of Philosophy

==== Faculty of Biological Sciences ====
Dean: Mafruhi Sattar

- Department of Botany
- Department of Biochemistry and Molecular Biology
- Department of Biotechnology and Genetic Engineering
- Department of Microbiology
- Department of Pharmacy
- Department of Public Health and Informatics
- Department of Zoology

==== Faculty of Business Studies ====
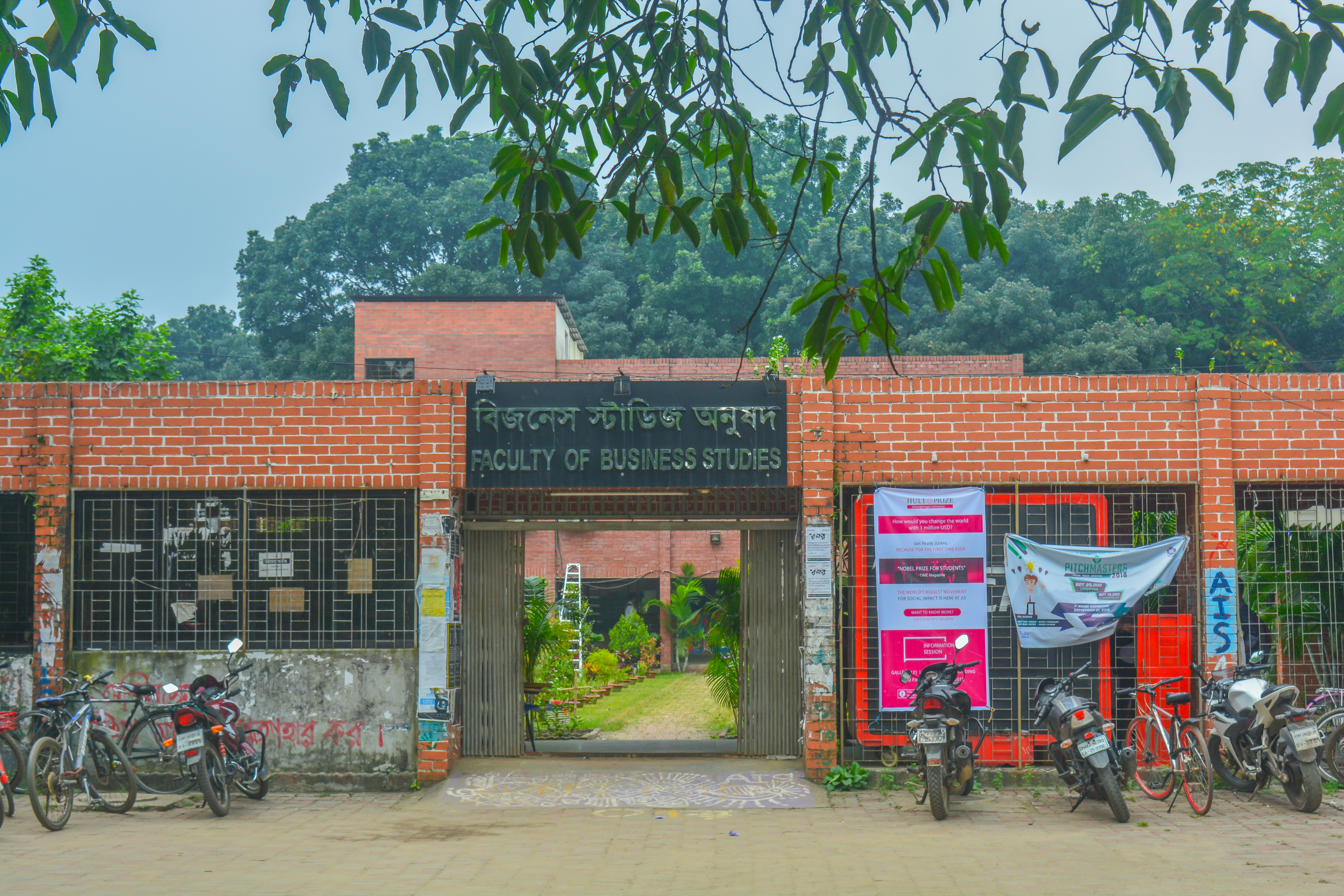
Faculty of Business Studies

Dean: Abu Sayef Md Muntaquimul Bari Chowdhuri

- Department of Accounting and Information Systems
- Department of Finance and Banking
- Department of Marketing
- Department of Management Studies

==== Faculty of Law ====
Dean: MD. Robiul Islam PhD

- Department of Law and Justice

=== Institutes ===
There are four institutes for specialised research and training:

- Institute of Business Administration (E Unit) Jahangirnagar University (IBA-JU) started as the university's Department of Business Administration (DBA) in 1991. This institute is the first in Bangladesh to offer an undergraduate degree in business. It offers a four-year course of study leading to a Bachelor of Business Administration (BBA) degree, and an eighteen-month post-graduate Master of Business Administration (MBA) program. Since May 2012, there is a Master of Business Administration program for the professionals in weekdays. As of October 2015, the institute admits 50 students every year to its undergraduate programme. IBA-JU offers : Banking and Finance, Marketing, Human Resource Management, Accounting and Information Systems, Management Information Systems, Quantitative Business Analysis, Development Management, International Business as major IBA-JU has seven student organisations such as Infusion-The Cultural Club of IBA-JU, Communic, IBA-JU Business Club, IBA-JU Social Welfare Club, Envision:IBA-JU Photography Club, IBA-JU Sports Club and IBA-JU Debating Club.
- Institute of Information Technology(A Unit) was established in 2009.
- Institute of Comparative Literature and Culture(C Unit)
- Institute of Remote Sensing and GIS provides postgraduate degrees.

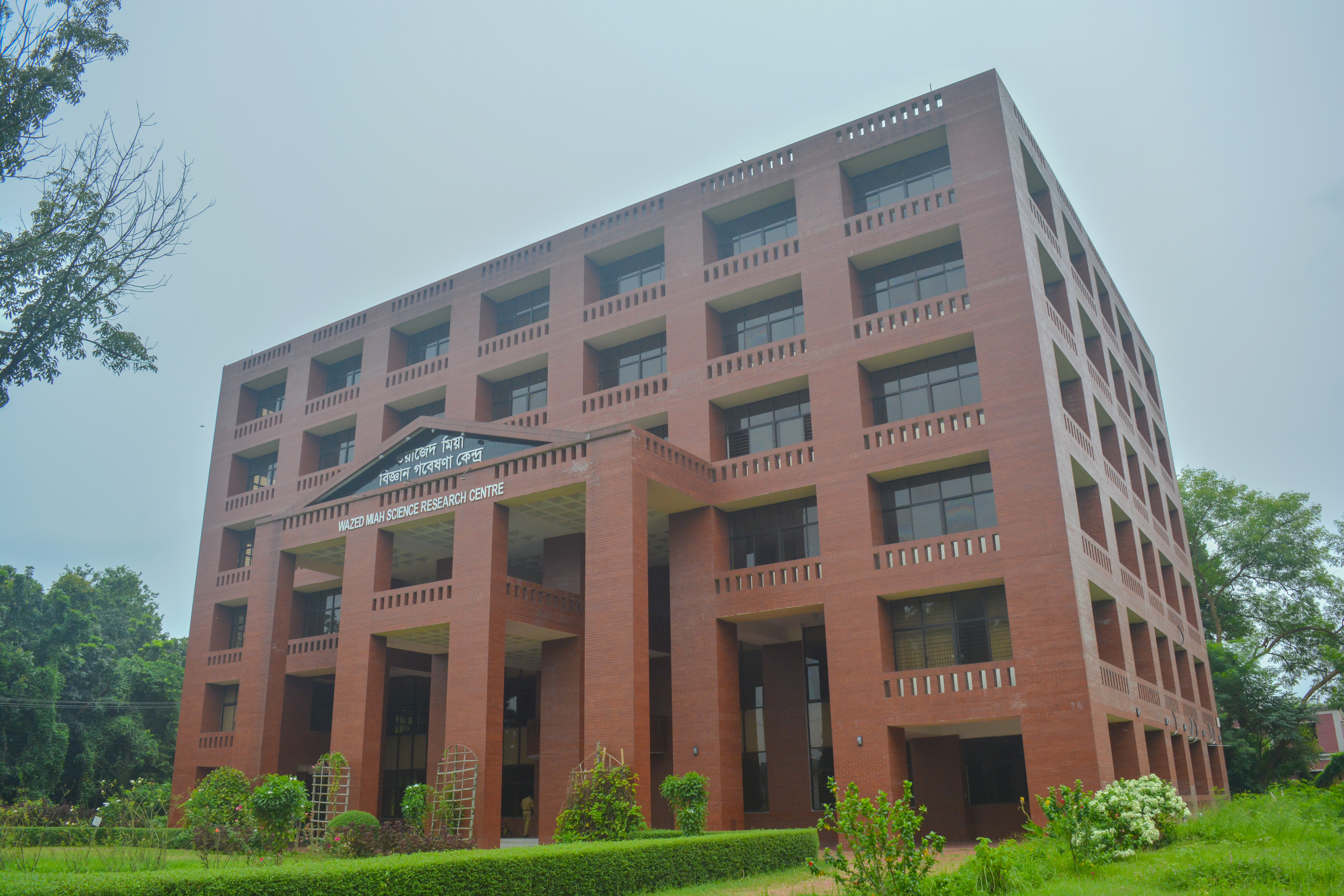
Wazed Miah Science Research Centre

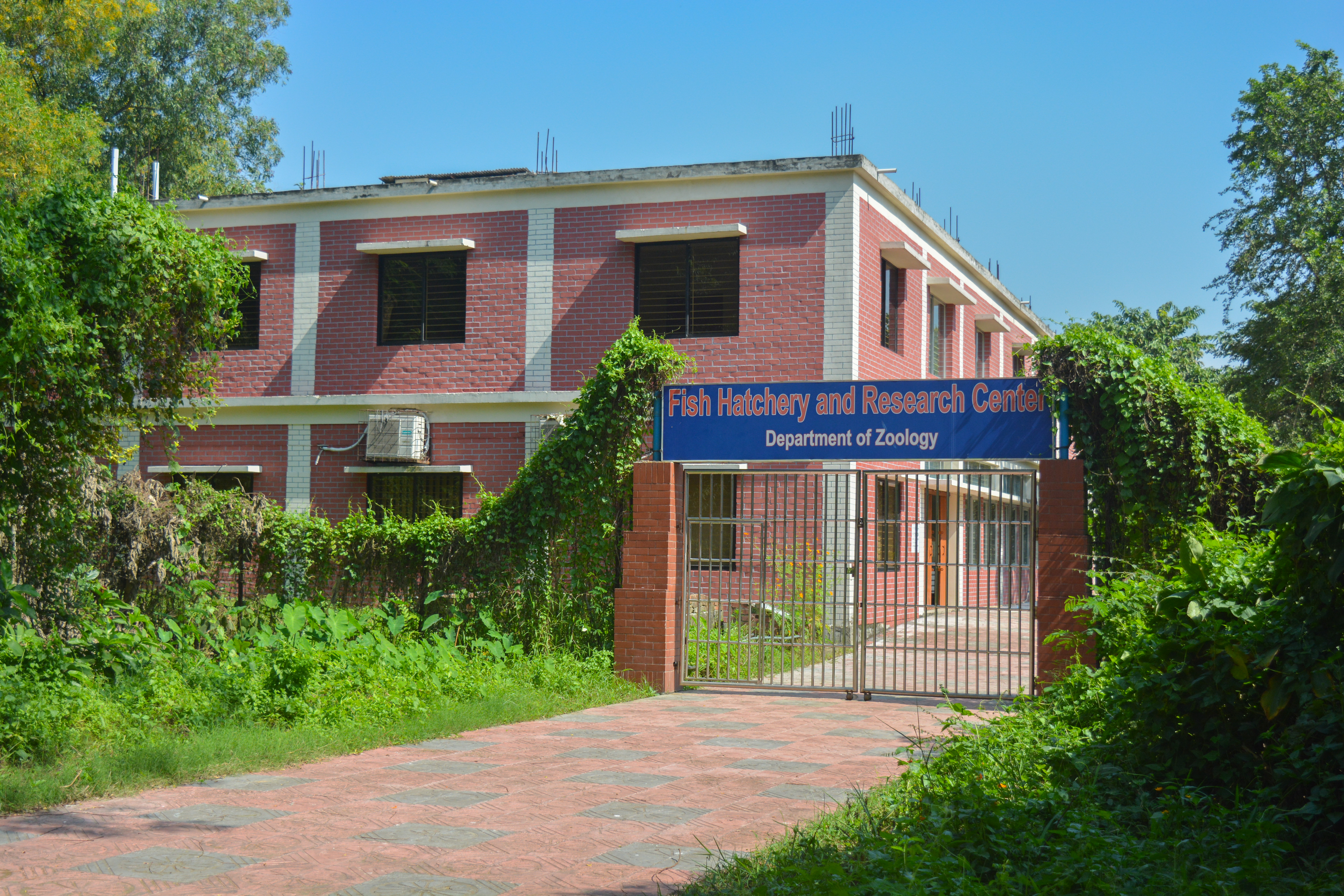
Fish Hatchery and Research Center

=== Research ===
Jahangirnagar University is illustrating a notable growth in scientific progression over the years. In 2022, 722 Scopus-indexed publications were recorded by the JU teachers and students which is almost 3.6 folds compared to what it was in 2017. According to SCOPUS database, almost 6.7 thousand articles are recorded from this institution (till October, 2025), where the most contributing fields of research were Physics, Computer science, Medicine, Engineering, Chemistry, Environmental Science, Material Science, Biochemistry, Genetics, and Molecular Biology consists of almost 65% of the total research took place in JU till 2024. Academically, JU also provides graduate degrees like Mphil and PhD in most of the departments. The Wazed Miah Science Research centre consists of numerous modern equipments for scientific research including spectroscopes, microscopes, HPLC, water sample analyser and so on. The butterfly park is the home of almost 110 species of butterflies which is established with a vision to research on biodiversity, breeding, and role of butterflies on environment. The university also arranges butterfly fair to spread awareness among children and mass people, and also showcases the diverse species present in JU. The Wari-Bateshwar historical archaeological site was one of the most notable findings from the archaeology department of Jahangirnagar University. The traces of human presence and man-made materials dating back some 1,000-1,200 years have been found in the world's largest coastal mangrove forest Sundarbans is also one of the prominent hypothesis made by the archaeological research group led by Sufi Mostafizur Rahman.

=== Rankings ===
From 2023, in Times Higher Education World University Rankings, JU was placed between 801-1000th among the best global universities and ranked first in Bangladesh in 2023-24. In 2023, JU placed 351-400 position in Times Higher Education Asian University Ranking, the leading university in Bangladesh; and that improved further again in to 301-350 among Asian universities (2024) and placed at first in Bangladesh. The research quality score of JU was 71.9 during this period, which is the 2nd highest among Bangladeshi universities, and the highest among ranked public universities. In terms of teaching, it also stood 2nd with a score of 24.9 in Bangladesh. In subject ranking of the same ranking during 2024, JU ranked 501-600th globally in physical sciences (2024), 401-500th globally in 2025, and 301-350th in social sciences. In QS rankings, JU was placed between 1201-1400th among the top global universities and 351-400th among best Asian universities, 90th among the best Southern Asia universities.

The QS World University Rankings ranked university 294th in Asia in 2025.

Jahangirnagar University Rankings
Ranking Organization	Rank
QS World	1201-1400th
QS Southern Asia	90th
THE World	801-1000th
THE Asia	301-350th

== Student life ==
With 21 residential halls, Jahangirnagar University is mandated to provide residential accommodation to every student with separate halls for female students. Each hall has its own administration system headed by a provost and is equipped with facilities such as playgrounds, rooms for indoor games, dining halls, etc.

=== Halls/dorms ===
==== Halls for male students ====
- Al Beruni Hall: the oldest dormitory of the campus, named after Abū Rayḥān al-Bīrūnī; it has an extension building.It was built in 1971
- Mir Mosharrof Hossain Hall: named after Mir Mosharraf Hossain, noted for its beautiful butterfly-shaped architecture. The 2nd Male hall and established on 1991
- A. F. M. Kamaluddin Hall: named after one of the ex-vice-chancellors of Jahangirnagar University A.F.M. Kamaluddin, a geographer, who died on duty.
- Shaheed Salam Barkat Hall: named after Abdus Salam and Abul Barkat two language martyrs of the Bengali language movement,
- Shahid Rafiq Jabbar Hall: named after another two language martyrs of Bengali language movement, Rafiq Uddin Ahmed and Abdul Jabbar.
- Maulana Bhashani Hall: named after Maulana Abdul Hamid Khan Bhashani.
- Sher-e-Bangla AK Fazlul Haque Hall: named after A. K. Fazlul Huq.
- Bishwakabi Rabindranath Tagore Hall: named after kobiguru Rabindranath Tagore.
- Nawab Salimullah Hall: named after Nawab Sir Khwaja Salimullah Bahadur, The forth Nawab of Dhaka.
- Shaheed Tajuddin Ahmad Hall : named after Tajuddin Ahmed, the first Prime Minister of Bangladesh.
- Jatiya Kabi Kazi Nazrul Islam Hall : named after national poet Kazi Nazrul Islam.

==== Halls for female students ====
- Nawab Faizunnesa Hall: named after the educator Nawab Faizunnesa Choudhurani (1834–1903).
- Fajilatunnesa Hall: named after the first Bengali female graduate in mathematics from University of Dhaka. The original hall became unusable due to its poor condition, prompting the relocation of students to a new hall with the same name.
- Jahanara Imam Hall: named after Jahanara Imam.
- Pritilata Hall: named after Pritilata Waddedar.
- Begum Khaleda Zia Hall: named after Khaleda Zia, former prime minister of Bangladesh.
- July 24 Jagoroni Hall: named after the July Revolution
- Sufia Kamal Hall: named after kobi Sufia Kamal, a famous poet and a political activist.
- Shaheed Felani Khatun Hall: named after Felani Khatun
- Rokeya Hall: named after Begum Rokeya.
- Bir Protik Taramon Bibi Hall: named after Bir Protik Taramon Bibi, female freedom fighter of Bangladesh.

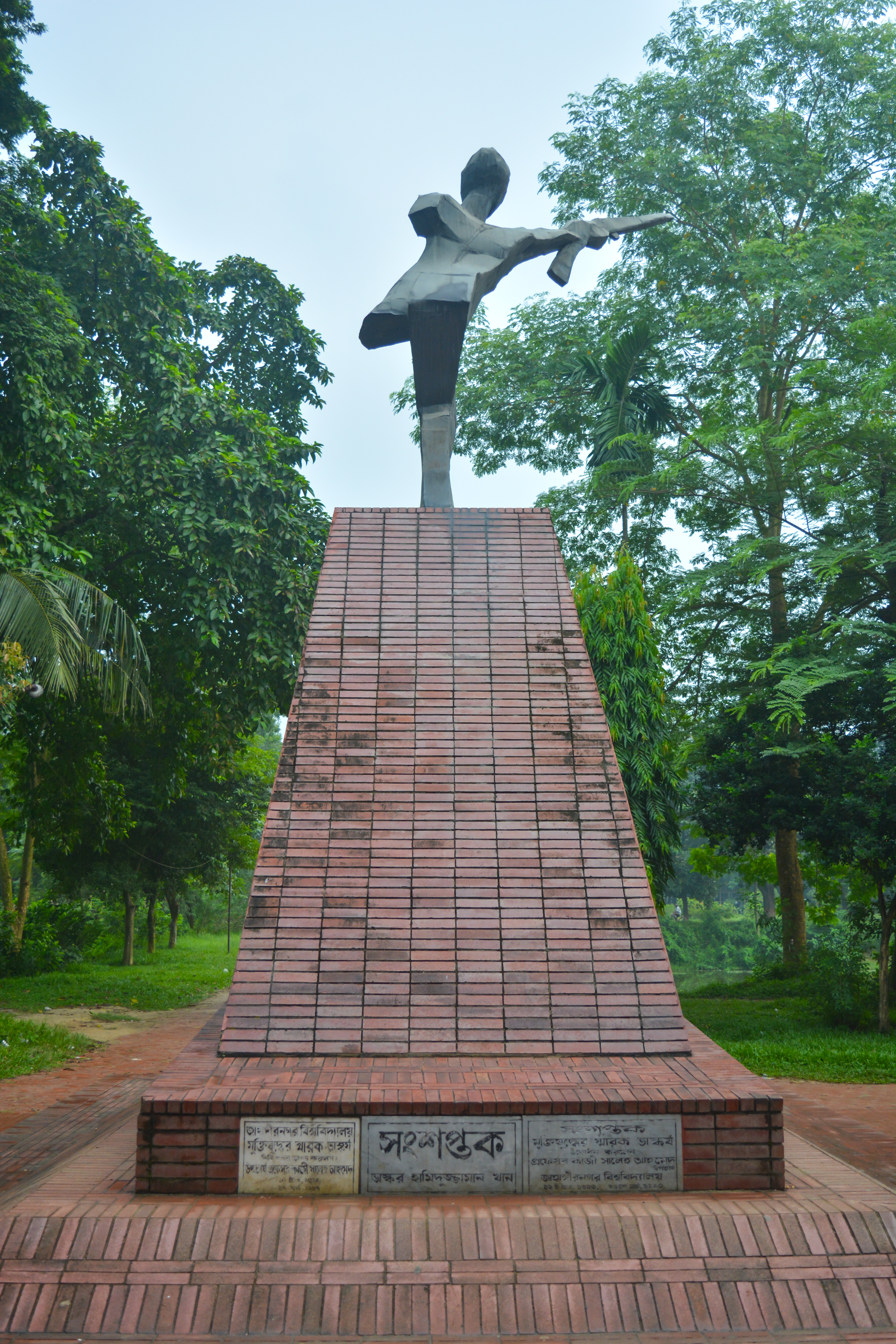
Central Library Gate

=== Central Library ===
Established in 1985, the JU library is equipped with a huge collection of books. Located behind a monument of "Sangshaptak" (সংশপ্তক), the library is conveniently placed between the main academic buildings and the dormitories. The entire area has Wi-Fi coverage. There are more than 110,000 books, 14,000 hardbound journals, and 22,000 online journals in the library. The library can accommodate over 500 students at a time. There is a cyber centre on the premises. Airy with ample glass openings, the library is an elegant piece of architecture.

=== TSC ===
The teachers-student centre has a prime role in improving the relationship between the teachers and the students of the campus. It is a cultural hub for the university. The offices of several cultural organizations are located here, where they practice for the cultural programs and rehearse. Indoor games like carrom, table tennis, and chess are available. Moreover, the language learning centre is also located here, where short courses are offered for university students to learn several foreign languages. Different cultural groups usually perform drama and cultural programs at Muktomacha. Shaptam Chayamancha is a great attraction for students at leisure period.

=== Zahir Raihan Auditorium ===
The "Zahir Raihan Auditorium", located in the TSC complex, is named after Zahir Raihan, a famous Bangladeshi novelist, writer, and filmmaker. There is also a seminar hall for seminars, meetings, and cultural programmes. The auditorium has 1500 seats, while the seminar hall can accommodate 250 people. It is an auditorium fully equipped for drama, cultural activities, international conferences, and other similar events.

=== Sculptures and architecture ===
The highest monument commemorating the language movement is situated in Jahangirnagar University. This sculpture is named Amar Ekushey. Muktomoncho, a platform which was established and named after the great artist Selim Al Deen, the inaugurator of the department of drama and dramatics at JU. The sequential red-brick built stairs in front of the stage provides a captivating sight where audiences sit and enjoy the programs. Different cultural groups, artists usually perform here frequently. The Sangsaptak is the sculpture which holds the untold stories of the Liberation War. The 15-feet high bronze sculpture was installed in 1990 in front of the university's central library. It was built by the eminent sculptor Hamiduzzaman Khan, whose intention was to uphold the spirit of the 1971 Liberation War. A Shaheed Minar designed by architect Robiul Hossain was erected in front of the Arts Building in 2008 to commemorate the deaths that took place during the Bengali language movement. It is the tallest Shaheed Minar in the country.

=== Other spots ===
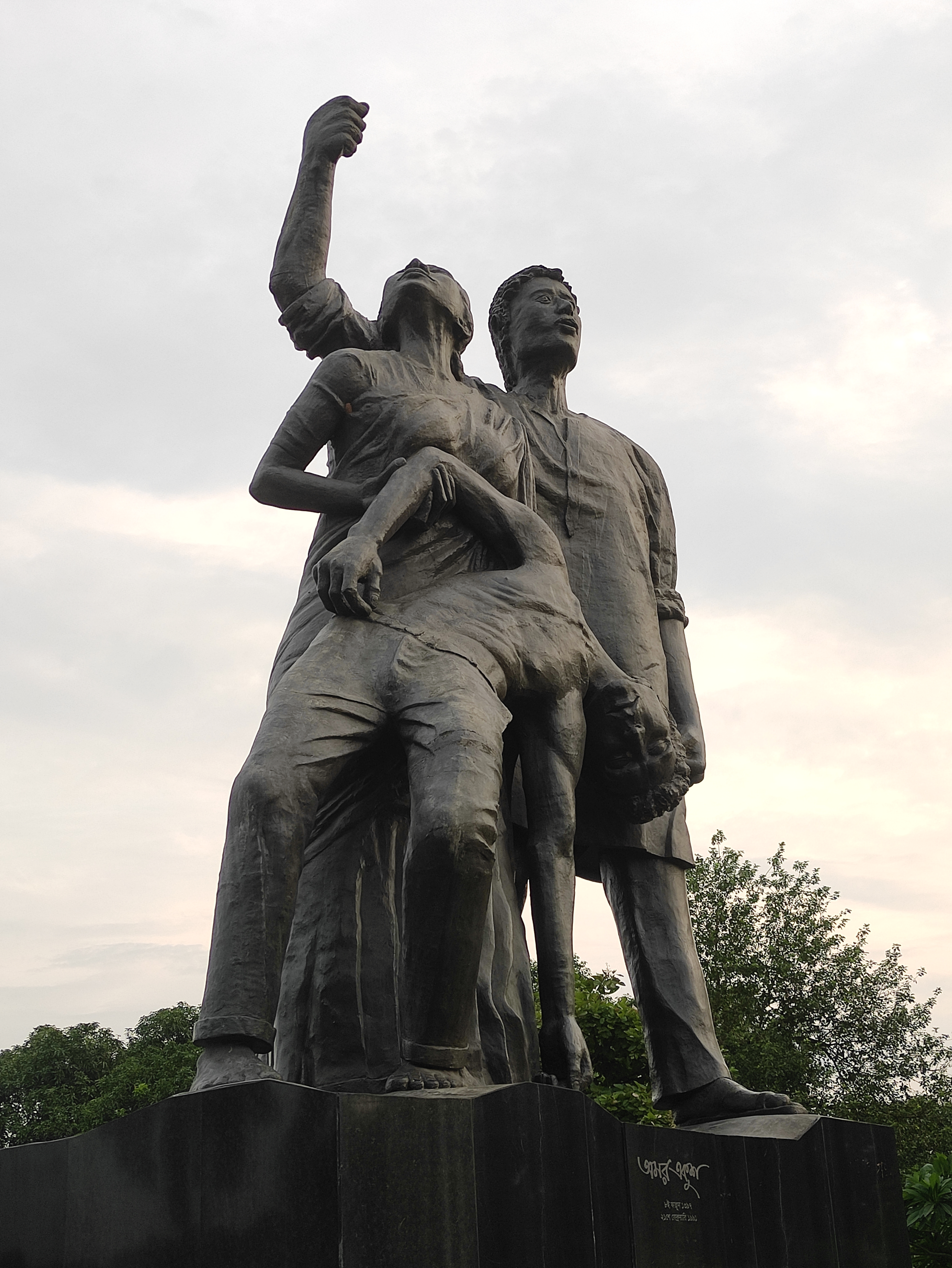
Amar Ekushey (monument) from front up close

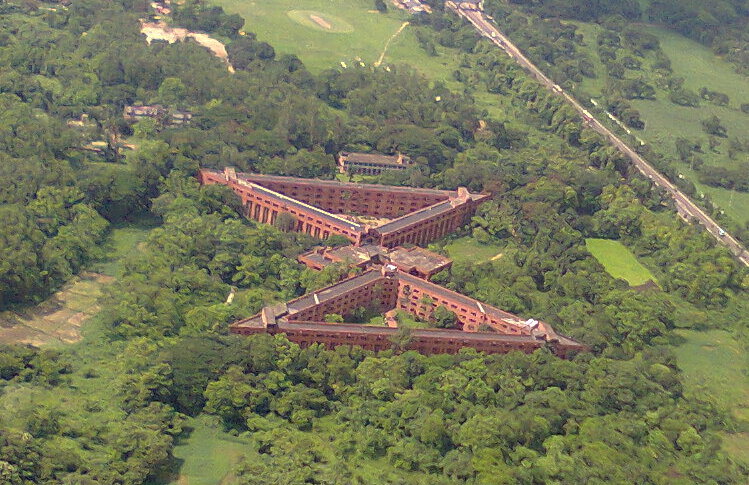
Mir Mosharraf Hossain Hall

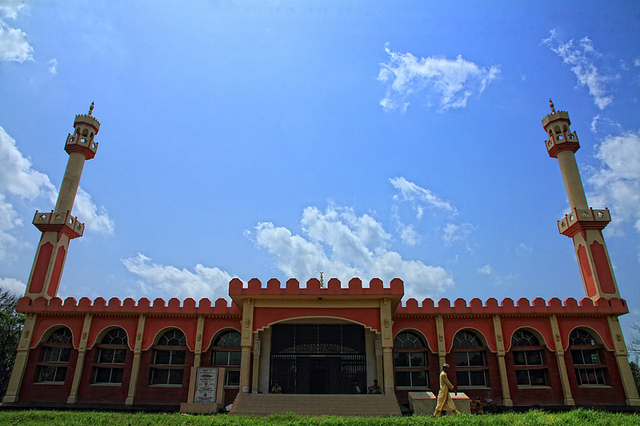
Central Mosque

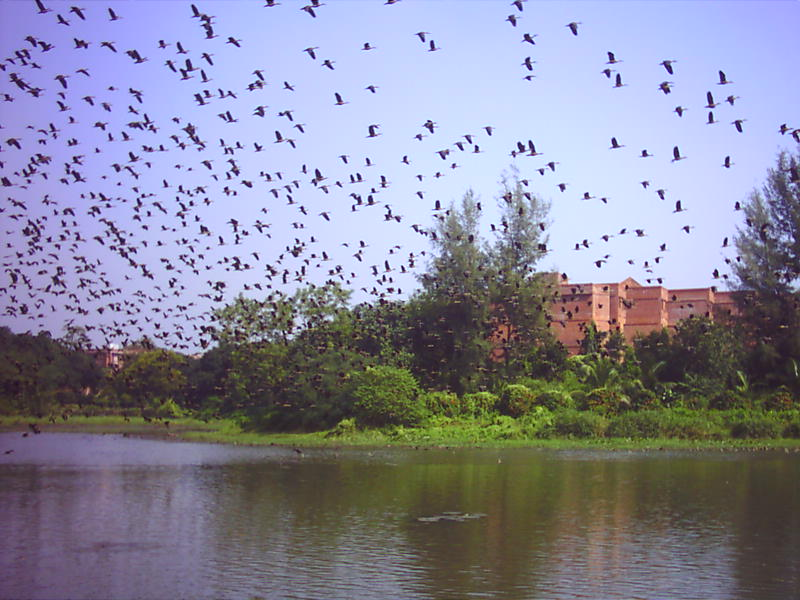
Migratory birds over water

The cafeteria is located behind the Amar Ekushey monument. The whole campus features trees and 12-13 lakes, hosting migratory birds every winter. Facilities include a central play ground and a central Mosque located near the main entrance. Popular food spots on campus includes Bot Tola and Tarzan Point. There is also a large swimming pool, but it has been abandoned. "Monpura", named after an island in Bangladesh, is situated behind the botanical garden and features elevated terrain alongside a lake. Another notable spot, London Bridge, lies at the juncture of two expansive lakes, along the pathway leading to the registrar building serving as site for watching migratory birds within the campus, . Access to campus is provided by several gates including, dairy gate (the main and the most popular), Joy Bangla gate (also known as Prantik gate), and Mir Mosharraf Hossain Hall gate.

== Notable people ==
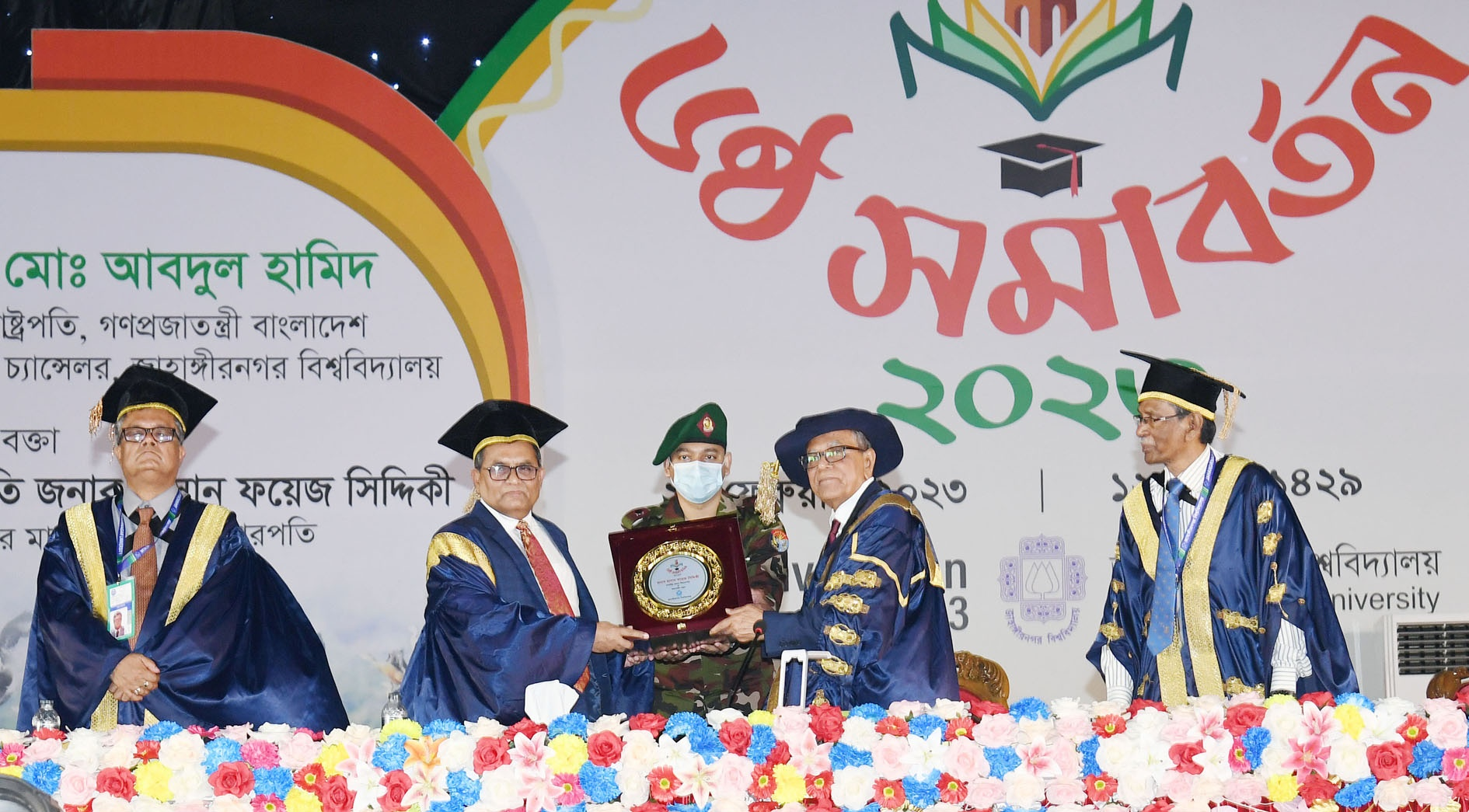
Former chief justice of Bangladesh, Hasan Foez Siddique being awarded by former president and chancellor of the university, Mohammad Abdul Hamid at the 4th convocation.

=== Alumni ===
- Faruque Ahmed, theatre and television actor
- Kafil Ahmed, poet, singer, and painter of Bangladesh of contemporary age
- Azam Ali, scientist known for having developed a wound dressing
- AKM Enamul Haque Shamim, former MP of Bangladesh and former deputy minister of water resource
- Arindam Banik, IMI Kolkata Director
- Selim Al Deen, playwright and theatrical artist
- Shariff Enamul Kabir, chemist and former VC of JU
- Abdul Hannan Chowdhury, academic, Vice-chancellor of North South University and Chairman of Grameen Bank
- Humayun Faridi, theatrical performer
- C. Emdad Haque, academic, environmentalist, and author
- Fahmida Khatun, policy analyst and economist
- A A Mamun, famous plasma scientist
- Shibli Mohammad, dancer and choreographer
- Mashrafe Bin Mortaza, former MP of Bangladesh and ODI captain of Bangladesh National Cricket team
- Mohammad Rafiq, poet awarded Bangla Academy Literary Award in 1987 and Ekushey Padak in 2010
- Mushfiqur Rahim, national cricket team player and former captain of the team
- Mohammad Mahfizur Rahman, competed in the 50 m freestyle event at the 2012 and 2016 Summer Olympics
- Mohammad Salahuddin, former national team cricketer and national team coach
- Shahiduzzaman Selim, theatre, television and film actor
- Soumitra Sekhar Dey, leading Bengali linguist, educationist, and writer
- Mehedi Haque, Bengali cartoonist, editor
- Mubarak Ahmed Khan, winner of the Independence Award

=== Faculty ===
- Syed Ali Ahsan, national professor
- Shariff Enamul Kabir, university administrator
- Mustafa Nurul Islam, national professor and former director general of Bangla Academy
- Hayat Mamud, essayist-poet
- Abdullah Al Mamun, Friedrich Wilhelm Bessel Research Award-winning physicist
- Anu Muhammad, economist and anthropologist
- Mohammad Rafiq, poet awarded Bangla Academy Literary Award in 1987 and Ekushey Padak in 2010
- Syed Safiullah, environmental scientist
- Zillur Rahman Siddiqui, Shwadhinota Puroshkar winning professor
- Jasim Uddin Ahmed FRSC (London) was awarded Ekushey Padak for his significant contribution in education in 2006.

== Convocation ==
The first convocation of JU was held in 1997. Then the second, third, fourth, and fifth convocations took place during 2001, 2006, 2010, and 2015, respectively. The 6th convocation took place almost 8 years later, on 25 February 2023, where more than 15 thousand students participated. The acting vice-chancellor during the 6th convocation was Nurul Alam, and the chief guest was the chancellor and former president of Bangladesh, Mohammad Abdul Hamid.

== See also ==
- Bangladesh University of Engineering and Technology (BUET)
- University of Dhaka (DU)
- University of Rajshahi (RU)
- University of Chittagong (CU)
