= Ali Azam =

Ali Azam may refer to:

- Ali Azam (Comilla politician) (born 1959), Bangladesh Awami League politician
- Ali Azam (Barisal politician) (bonr 1972), Bangladesh Awami League politician

== See also ==
- Azam Ali (born 1970), Iranian musician
- Azam Ali (scientist), Bangladeshi scientist
