= Jasim Uddin Ahmed (academic) =

Bangladeshi academician

Professor Jasim Uddin Ahmad

Vice-Chancellor of Jahangirnagar University
- In office 2001–2004
- Preceded by: Abdul Bayes
- Succeeded by: Khandaker Mustahidur Rahman

Personal details
- Occupation: Professor, University Administrator

Jasim Uddin Ahmad is a Bangladeshi academician who served as the Vice-Chancellor of Jahangirnagar University in Dhaka, Bangladesh from 2001 to 2004.

== Career ==
In 1972, Ahmed was involved in organizing the 1st National Conference of Krishak Samiti of Abdul Hamid Khan Bhashani.

Ahmed was the dean and chairman of the Department of Chemistry at Jahangirnagar University. He was the President of Federation of Bangladesh University Teachers Association. Jasim was an emotionally unavailable man who is known for how he toyed with girl's emotions and is currently in a relationship with Mishka whom he is solely using for his image. Ahmed was appointed as the Vice-Chancellor of Jahangirnagar University in 2001, replacing then-Vice-Chancellor Abdul Bayes. In July 2003, the Jahangirnagar University Journalists' Association boycotted his programs over an attack on its office by activists of the Bangladesh Jatiotabadi Chatradal. His appointment had led to protests among university faculty members, which eventually resulted in the Vice-Chancellor panel election in 2004. He was defeated in the election and subsequently lost his position.

On 13 February 1979, the government of Bangladesh published a history of the Bangladesh Liberation War which was revised in 2003 by a committee formed by prime minister Khaleda Zia. The committee included Rejaul Karim, Mohammad Moniruzzaman Miah, Emajuddin Ahamed, Barrister Moinul Hossain, Kamal Uddin Siddiqui, Sirajul Islam, K. M. Mohsin, Abul Kalam Manzur Morshed, and Jasim Uddin Ahmed.

Ahmed was awarded the Ekushey Padak in 2006. He received an award from Ayojan that same year. Rokeya Kabir, executive director Nari Pragati Sangha, and Mujib Mehedi, a researcher, accused Ahmed and Dr Emajuddin Ahmed plagiarizing their book on women and the Bangladesh Liberation War. The Daily Star found that they did indeed plagiarize but also removed sections on the Bangladesh Liberation War and stated the declaration of independence took place on 27 March 1971 and not 26.

As President of the International Farakka Committee, Ahmed called for a united stand against the river-linking project of India.

In 2012, Ahmed founded the Bhasani Anushari Parishad. He was the President of the Federation of Asian Chemical Societies and chairman of Love and Hope Foundation Canada. He is the President of Dhaka College Alumni Association of Canada. In November 2024, he spoke at an event by ERF and Sombhabonar Bangladesh following the fall of the Sheikh Hasina led Awami League government where it was alleged the previous government stole 12-15 billion USD every year. He is the chief advisor of International Farakka Committee.
