= Shariff Enamul Kabir =

Bangladeshi academic

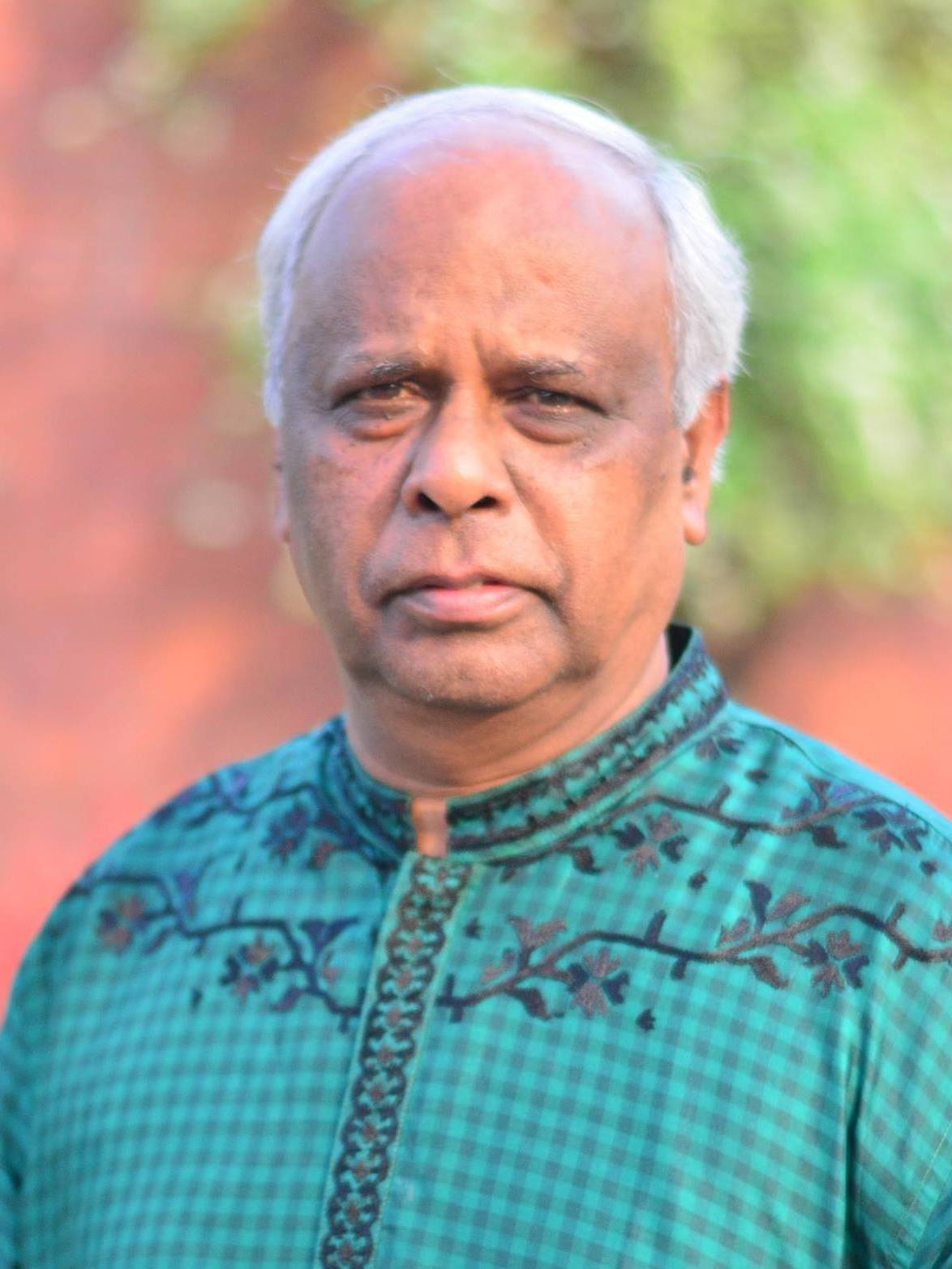

Vice Chancellor of Jahangirnagar University
- In office 24 February 2009 – May 2012
- Succeeded by: M. Anwar Hossain

Personal details
- Born: 28 February 1955 (age 71) Gopalganj District, East Pakistan, Pakistan
- Education: Jahangirnagar University, University College London

Shariff Enamul Kabir (born 28 February 1955) is a Bangladeshi academic who served as the vice-chancellor of Jahangirnagar University from 24 February 2009 until May 2012.

== Early life and education ==
Kabir was born on 28 February 1955 in Gopalganj District, East Pakistan, Pakistan. He has published more than three hundred articles in different journals. He has been an elected fellow of the Bangladesh Academy of Sciences since 1999.

Kabir completed his master's from the Department of Chemistry at Jahangirnagar University in 1979. He obtained his Ph.D. in Cluster Chemistry from University College London.

== Career ==
Kabir was a lecturer at the Jahangirnagar University from 1979 to 1983. He was an associate professor from 1987 to 1992 when he was promoted to professor. He established the Wazed Mia Science Research Institute at the university.

Kabir served as the vice-chancellor of Jahangirnagar University from 24 February 2009 until May 2012. In 2011, Bangladesh Chhatra League leaders from Gopalganj took over dormitories of the university with alleged support of Kabir. He was forced to resign after a student was killed by Bangladesh Chhatra League. There was protests against Kabir with students alleging he preferred officials and students who like him were also from Gopalganj District; also the home district of Prime Minister Sheikh Hasina. He was an Awami League leader of Gopalganj District. He is a former president of Jahangirnagar University Teachers Association.

Kabir was the vice-president of Bangladesh Association for the Advancement of Sciences. He is a former General Secretary of the Bangladesh Chemical Society.

Kabir was the president of Bangabandhu Parishad at Jahangirnagar University for 20 years. He served as a member of the Senate and Syndicate of Jahangirnagar University. He served as an Independent Director of the board of directors of Sonar Bangla Insurance Limited led by Sheikh Kabir Hossain.

On 25 November 2021, Kabir was appointed an UGC Professor by the University Grants Commission for a two-year term.

== Awards ==
- Bangladesh Academy of Sciences Gold Medal (1998) (Physical Sciences, Senior Group)
- Jahangirnagar University Prize of books (1979)
- University Grants Commission Award (Two Times)
- Academy of Science Gold Medal (Senior Group) in 1998
