= Kafil Ahmed =

Bangladeshi poet

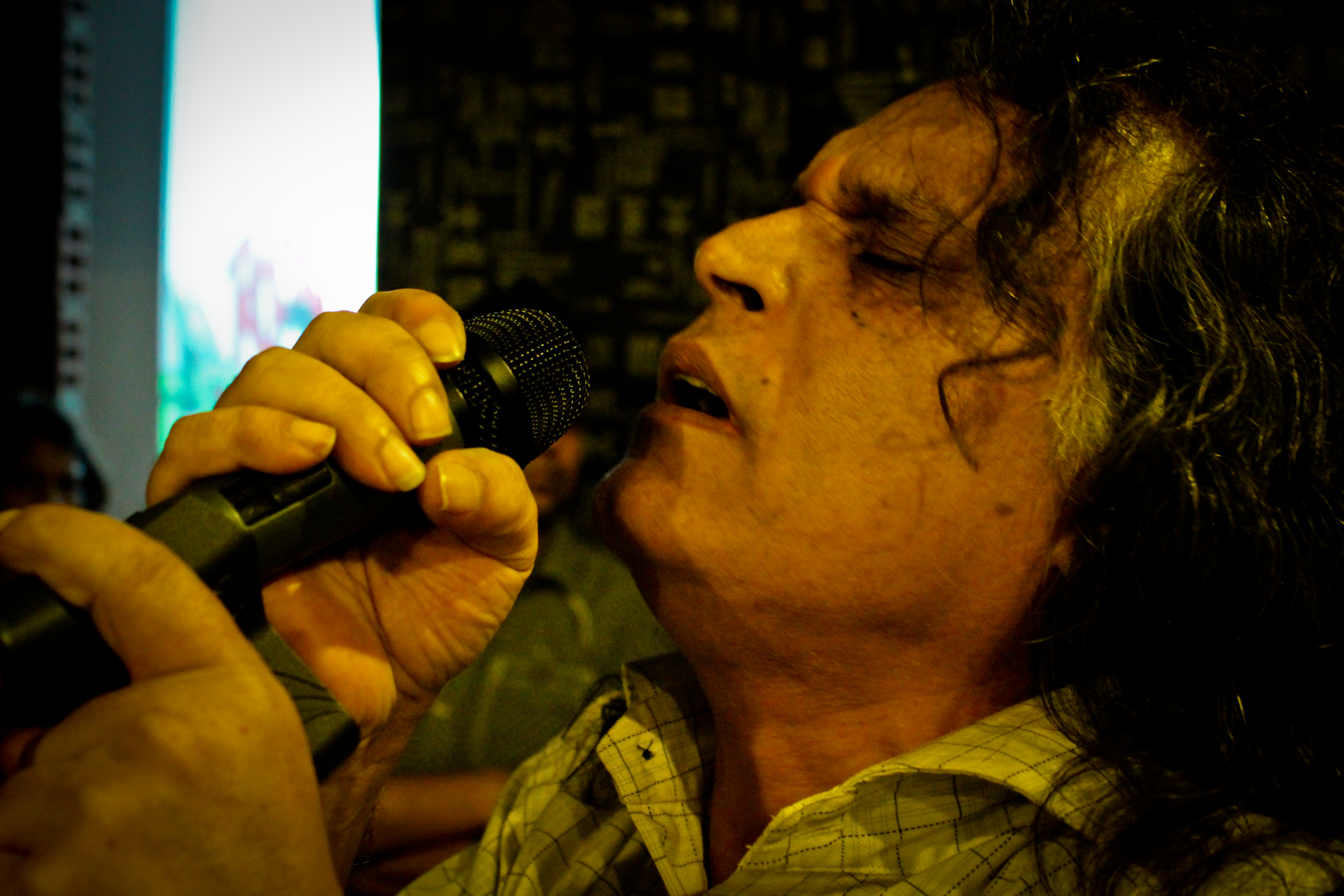
- Born: 1 September 1962 (age 64); Kishoreganj, East Pakistan
- Occupation: Musician
- Known for: Bengali folk music

Kafil Ahmed (Bengali: কফিল আহমেদ; born 1 September 1962) is a contemporary Bangladeshi poet and singer-songwriter. He is particularly known for his work in the songs for all beings, a new type of Bangla soul music.

== Early life and education ==
Kalif had publications in various literature magazines, literature supplements and other forms of non-traditional media.

Kafil was born on 1 September 1962 at Kishoreganj in East Pakistan (present-day Bangladesh). He belongs to a progressive farming family. His father, Abdur Rahman Maru Sarkar, was a social worker and an inspirational figure, as well as an organizer of the progressive farmers' movement. Maleka Akhter is his mother. Kafil Ahmed did his bachelor in English linguistics and literature from Jahangirnagar University. He is one of the organizers of 'Mon Kohuar Gaan and Sarbapran Sangskritik Shakti". He published his first collection of poetry "Junction" as a student. The book was published by Brintok Publishers in 1987.

== Career ==
A self-taught musician, Kafil's musical work started with adding tunes to the years old Chorjageeti in the 1990s. The live performance in different parts of the country of the age-old rhymes was along with instruments and drama. The performance also included songs from his own creation and arrangement. In 2002, Kafil's first collection of his written songs entitled Mighty power in wings of feather, Maya in the eyes of cows was released from Ghorautra Production, Dhaka. The album consisted of tracks such as Mesh your soul with the other one, Fire Eater, Fire Sleeper and Stands a horse with a broken neck. The album is considered one of the pioneers in the trend of new songs in Bangla music by rejuvenating the thousand-years-old trend of Shomogeet and Gonoshongeet.
