= Mohammad Noman (educationist) =

- Died: 6 September 1996
- Education: MA (English)
- Alma mater: University of Dhaka
- Occupations: university academic, principal

Mohammad Noman (died on 6 September 1996) was a Bangladeshi academic. He was awarded Ekushey Padak in 1994 by the government of Bangladesh for his contribution to education.

== Education and career ==
Noman completed his bachelor's degree and master's from the department of English at the University of Dhaka.

Noman debuted his teaching career as a lecturer in the University of Dhaka at the department of English. He then moved to government service and joined Chittagong College in 1951 and then to Rajshahi College in 1952. He was transferred to Dhaka College in 1954 and stayed in the position until 1985. He worked at Murari Chand College in Sylhet during 1960–1962. He served as the principal of Dhaka College for five years.

Noman was appointed the treasurer and vice-chancellor of Jahangirnagar University.

== Awards ==
- Presidential Gold Medal (1970)
- Ekushey Padak (1994)
