= C. Emdad Haque =

Canadian academic

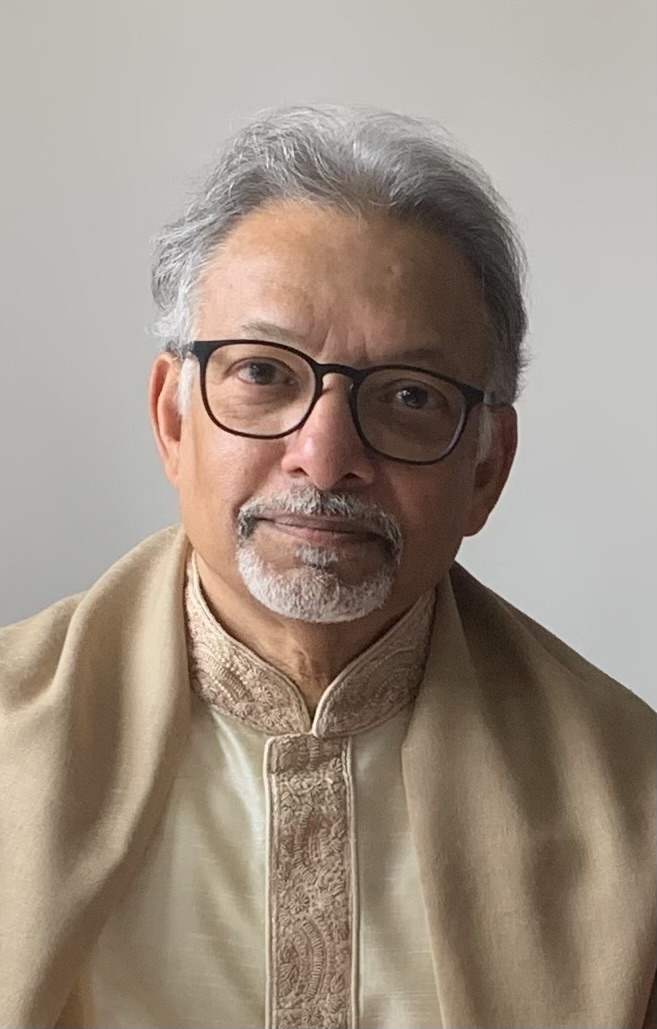
- Born: June 27, 1954 (age 72); Dhaka, Bangladesh
- Occupations: Academic, environmentalist, and author

Academic background
- Education: BA Hons in Environment and Geography; MA in Environment and Geography; PhD in Resource and Environmental Management
- Alma mater: Jahangirnagar University, Bangladesh; University of Manitoba, Canada
- Thesis: (1988)

Academic work
- Institutions: University of Manitoba; Natural Resources Institute, University of Manitoba
- Main interests: Natural hazards and disasters risk assessment environmental management social epidemiology policy analysis
- Notable works: Hazards in a Fickle Environment: Bangladesh (1997); Mitigation of Natural Hazards and Disasters: International Perspectives (2005)

C. Emdad Haque is a Canadian academic, environmentalist, and author. He is a professor in the Natural Resources Institute of the Clayton H. Riddell Faculty of Environment, Earth, and Resources at the University of Manitoba and Chief Technical Advisor at the Bangabandhu Centre of Bangladesh Studies in Canada.

Haque's research interests primarily focus on resource and environmental management, with a particular emphasis on human health and water resource management, hazard and disaster management, environmental risk assessment, social epidemiology, and policy analysis. He has authored nine books, including Mitigation of Natural Hazards and Disasters: International Perspectives and Disaster Risk and Vulnerability: Mitigation through Mobilizing Communities and Partnerships and has published over 200 articles. In addition, he is the founding member of the International Disaster Management Professional Association and the founder-president of the Canadian Risk and Hazards Network – CRHNet.

== Early career and education ==
Haque earned his Baccalaureate degree in 1976, and his master's degree in 1978, both in Environment and Geography from Jahangirnagar University, Bangladesh. From 1978 to 1980 he served as a Research Fellow at the Bangladesh Institute for Developmental Studies and received a master's degree from the Geography Department of the University of Manitoba with a secondary interest in Anthropology in 1982. In 1984, he began his academic career as a lecturer in the Department of Geography at Jahangirnagar University.

Haque completed his Ph.D. with a specialization in Environmental and Resource Management in 1988 from the University of Manitoba and held the position of an assistant professor at Jahangirnagar University from 1988 to 1989. He served as a Research Associate at the Disaster Research Institute at the University of Manitoba as well. He received a fellowship at the Queen Elizabeth House as a visiting research fellow of the University of Oxford, UK from 1996 to 1997, and a [https://www.fulbright.ca/ Fulbright Visiting Research notjing else from the Canada USA Fulbright Foundation in 2008.

== Career ==
Following his Ph.D., Haque held a brief appointment as a lecturer in the Department of Applied Geography at Toronto Metropolitan University from 1988 to 1989. He was then appointed as an assistant professor in the Department of Geography at Brandon University and became a professor in 1999. Since 2001, he has been holding an appointment as a professor in the Natural Resources Institute of the Clayton H. Riddell Faculty of Environment, Earth, and Resources at the University of Manitoba, Canada, and since 2001 as Chief Technical Advisor at the Bangabandhu Centre of Bangladesh Studies in Canada.

Haque has been the chair at the Department of Geography and Acting Dean of the Faculty of Sciences at Brandon University as well as a Graduate Program Coordinator and director of the Natural Resources Institute (NRI) at the University of Manitoba. He has also been a member of the Canadian national delegation at the 2005 United Nations Hyogo World Conference on DRR, which formulated the Hyogo Framework for Action (2005–2015) globally.

== Research ==
Haque is most known for his work in natural hazards and disaster risk and vulnerability, mitigation of natural hazards, and social and ecological dimensions of environmental hazards. His projects have dealt with understanding societal and ecological processes in disasters and their mitigation, with broader applications to sustainable development, resilience and adaptation, management of social-ecological systems, and climate change.

=== Ecology and society ===
Haque's research has focused on the interrelationships between the biophysical environment and human society. In his book, Disaster Risk and Vulnerability: Mitigation through Mobilizing Communities and Partnerships, he evaluated the impact of natural disasters and economic stability and emphasized the significance of human collaboration and organizational efforts in effectively managing and mitigating disasters. He investigated the human adjustment systems within the Brahmaputra-Jamuna floodplain and examined the social and cultural dynamics involved in the resettlement of displaced individuals. In related research, he conducted a survey to analyze the behavior of people regarding cyclone warnings and found a lack in the effectiveness of existing warning systems. Together with David Hutton, he recognized recurring patterns of psychosocial coping and adaptation exhibited by displaced individuals in the flood plains of Bangladesh and highlighted the significance of community aspects and people's capacity to mitigate, enhance coping mechanisms, responds effectively, and recover resiliently from environmental extremes. He argued that "technological fix" as a means of physically preventing floods could potentially endanger the long-term sustainability of both the floodplain ecology and sociocultural resources of Bangladesh. In addition, he examined household risk factors, as well as the prevalence, abundance, and distribution of immature Aedes aegypti and Aedes albopictus mosquitoes. He explored the association between these mosquitoes and socioeconomic and ecological factors, both at the urban zonal and household levels within the city of Dhaka, Bangladesh.

=== Disaster risk reduction ===
Haque has worked in disaster risk reduction and identified several factors that primarily influence it and can help manage disasters. Highlighting the significant role of human dimensions, particularly their awareness and decision-making behavior, as influential factors in the rising losses caused by disasters, he emphasized in his book Mitigation of Natural Hazards and Disaster: International Perspectives that addressing human, social, and physical vulnerability through disaster mitigation can effectively contribute to both adaptation plans and sustainability objectives. In a collaborative study with Mahed-Ul-Islam Choudhury, they proposed the need of designing a multifaceted intervention aimed at sensitizing the population about disaster risks, with the goal of improving adaptive capacity.

Haque analyzed the coping and adaptation strategies employed by local communities in response to cyclones and storm surges and determined how transformative learning and risk-mitigation contribute to the development of community resilience against climate-induced disasters. He further studied various disaster management policies formulated by the government of Bangladesh, India, Sri Lanka, Brazil, and Canada and explained why disaster risk reduction requires a reorientation based on a foundation built on Indigenous and local knowledge, social learning, and narrative ways of knowing.

=== Sustainability ===
Haque's research primarily aims to evaluate risk factors, develop strategies for establishing a sustainable environment, and proposing various ways to mitigate them. He presented an evaluation of the existing knowledge and research on different types of natural hazards in Canada in his book titled An Assessment of Natural Hazards and Disasters in Canada. Moreover, he introduced an approach to addressing hazards from an ethics-ecological standpoint. He addressed the gaps in knowledge and understanding of policies, programs, and measures that can be applied to natural hazards and highlighted their impacts in an era of climate change and examined the factors influencing the collection and disposal of household recyclable and the effectiveness of institutional strategies to induce residents' participation in such a program. Developing an analytical framework, he provided a systematic approach for the formulation of sustainable energy strategies. Furthermore, he recognized the crucial role played by the implementation of an institutional initiative for innovative oyster-rearing techniques, along with the establishment of local-level organizations, in harmonizing conservation efforts. Additionally, he explained the importance of continuous research in preventing and mitigating natural disasters, emphasizing the need for an integrative approach that incorporates scientific, societal, and indigenous dimensions to effectively deal with people's risk and vulnerability to environmental hazards.

=== Creative work and film ===
Haque has been engaged in mobilizing his research findings and raising environmental awareness among the public in Canada and internationally through various means including films, mass and social media, and community forums. He produced, co-wrote, and co-directed with M.S. Rony, a docudrama film titled Dream Weavers, which won the Royal Reel Award in the environmental film competition at the 2015 Canada International Film Festival in Vancouver, Canada. A Bengali version of the film titled Putul Kotha premiered in Dhaka, Bangladesh on 9 April 2017.

== Awards and honors ==
- 1995 – Jalal Ahmed Gold Medal, Anwara Aziz Foundation
- 2003 – John H. Warkentin Award, Canadian Association of Geographers
- 2008 – Fulbright Award (Visiting Research Chair), Fulbright Foundation (USA)

== Bibliography ==
=== Selected books ===
- Hazards in a Fickle Environment: Bangladesh (1997) ISBN 0-7923-4869-9
- An Assessment of Natural Hazards and Disasters in Canada (2003) ISBN 1-4020-1179-2
- Mitigation of Natural Hazards and Disasters: International Perspectives (2005) ISBN 978-9048167968
- Disaster Risk and Vulnerability: Mitigation through Mobilizing Communities and Partnerships (2012) ISBN 978-0773539921

=== Selected articles ===
- Ross, Helen; Haque, C. Emdad; Berkes, Fikret (April 2024). "Transmission of knowledge and social learning for disaster risk reduction and building resilience: A Delphi study". Sustainable Development. 32 (2): 1525–1537. doi:10.1002/sd.2685.
- Haque, C. Emdad; Jakariya, Md. (27 June 2023). "Bengal Delta, Charland Formation, and Riparian Hazards: Why Is a Flexible Planning Approach Needed for Deltaic Systems?". Water. 15 (13): 2373. Bibcode:2023Water..15.2373H. doi:10.3390/w15132373.
- Hutton, D., & Haque, C. E. (2004). Human vulnerability, dislocation and resettlement: adaptation processes of river-bank erosion-induced displacees in Bangladesh. Disasters, 28(1), 41–62.
- Haque, C. E., & Etkin, D. (2007). People and community as constituent parts of hazards: the significance of societal dimensions in hazards analysis. Natural Hazards, 41, 271–282.
- Liming, H., Haque, C. E., & Barg, S. (2008). Public policy discourse, planning and measures toward sustainable energy strategies in Canada, Renewable and Sustainable Energy Reviews, 12(1), 91–115.
- Dhar-Chowdhury, P., Haque, C. E., Driedger, M. (2012). Public versus expert knowledge and perception of climate change-induced heat wave risk: A modified mental odel approach. Journal of Risk Research, 15(2), 149–168.
- Dhar-Chowdhury, P., Paul, K. K., Haque, C. E., Hossain, S., Lindsay, L. R., Dibernardo, A., ... & Drebot, M. A. (2017). Dengue seroprevalence, seroconversion and risk factors in Dhaka, Bangladesh. PLoS neglected tropical diseases, 11(3), e0005475.
- Uddin, M S., Haque, C. E., & Khan, M. N. (2020). Good governance and local level policy implementation for disaster-risk-reduction: Actual, perceptual and contested perspectives in coastal communities in Bangladesh. Disaster Prevention and Management. 30(2), 94–111,
- Choudhury, M-U-I., Haque, C. E., Nishat, A. & Byrne, S. 2021. Social learning for building community resilience to cyclone: Role of indigenous and local knowledge, power, and institutions in coastal Bangladesh. Ecology and Society, 26(1), 5.
- Haque, C. E., Berkes, F., Fernandez-Llamazares, A., Ross, H., Chapin III, F.S., Doberstein, B., ...& Hutton, D. (2022). Disaster Prevention and Management, 31(4), 335–348.
