= Kazi Saleh Ahmed =

Bangladeshi academic

Kazi Saleh Ahmed was a Bangladeshi academic, professor of statistics and data science; and the former vice-chancellor of the Jahangirnagar University. He was a member and vice-president of Bangladesh Paribesh Andolon.

== Career ==
From 1988 to 1993, Ahmed was the vice-chancellor of Jahangirnagar University. He resigned after some activists of the Jatiatabadi Chhatra Dal, student front of the ruling Bangladesh Nationalist Party, attacked teachers of the University.

Ahmed was the principal investigator of the Education Watch 2006 report. He was a member of a search committee formed by the Ministry of Education in 2008 to appoint vice-chancellors to public universities. He was the founding president of the Dhaka University Statistics Department Alumni Association.

Ahmed was an advisory member of the Jahangirnagar University Department of Statistics Alumni Association. He was a member of Bangladesh Paribesh Andolon. He was the chairman of Foundation for Research on Educational Planning and Development. He was a member of Human Rights Federation.

== Personal life ==
Ahmed's daughter, Meherun Ahmed, is the Dean of the School of Business and Entrepreneurship of the Independent University, Bangladesh.

== Death ==
Ahmed died on 25 June 2024 in Dhanmondi, Dhaka at the age of 83. Vice-Chancellor of Jahangirnagar University Md Nurul Alam and the Jahangirnagar University Department of Statistics Alumni Association expressed shock at his death. Jahangir University lowered flags across campus for one day of mourning.
