= Jahangirnagar University Swimming pool =

Swimming venue in Dhaka, Bangladesh

- Interactive map of Jahangirnagar University Swimming pool
- Location: Dhaka - 1342
- Coordinates: 23.8741°N 90.2656°E
- Owner: Jahangirnagar University
- Operator: Physical Education Department

Construction
- Cost: ৳ 42 lakh

Jahangirnagar University Swimming Pool, built in 1978, is a swimming sports competition hosting and training swimming pool. It is located in the South of the University Gymnasium. Unlike most sports swimming pools in Bangladesh, it is not affiliated to the National Sports Council. The overall maintenance of the pool is under the management of the physical education department of the university.

== History ==
Construction of the swimming pool began in 1978. 42 lakh Bangladeshi taka was allocated for the construction of the project. Although the main reservoir was constructed, the spectator gallery and swimmers' rest and changing rooms were left untouched from original design. The pool was usable for 8 years since construction. Due to faulty construction, the pool water used to rapidly drained, resulting in, the water supply being cut off from 1996. It is now abandoned.

== Hosting ==
This pool hosted several inter-department swimming competition before being abandoned.

== Wall paints and graffiti ==
After 2016, students of Fine arts, painted several thematic art works and graffities around the wall of the pool. Painting includes famous comic characters like Minions, Batman and Spiderman. As well as popular Bangladeshi cartoon character Tokai. 60 students involve in painting to transform the abandon pool into an open air art-walk.
