= Azam Ali (scientist) =

Bangladeshi scientist

- আজম আলী
- Education: Jahangirnagar University; Universiti Sains Malaysia
- Scientific career
- Workplaces: Pohang University of Science and Technology; University of North Carolina at Charlotte; University of Otago; AgResearch

Azam Ali is a Bangladeshi scientist known internationally as biomaterials and bioengineering experts for having developed a wound dressing, which earned him the Bayer Innovators Award in 2010.

== Education ==
Ali obtained his bachelor's and master's in chemistry from Jahangirnagar University in 1988 and 1991 respectively. In 2000, he obtained a Ph.D. degree in polymer science and engineering and nanotechnology from the Universiti Sains Malaysia.

== Career ==
Ali joined the Materials Science and Engineering department of Pohang University of Science and Technology as a post-doctoral research fellow in 2000. He joined the Chemistry department of the University of North Carolina at Charlotte in October 2000 and worked till July 2003 as a post-doctoral research fellow. There he conducted research on nano photoresist synthesis, photolithography, polymeric/biopolymeric biomaterials development, tissue engineering, materials and biomaterial characterisation. He spent years working in various institutes in Malaysia (Malaysian Palm Oil Board), Japan (JAERI), South Korea (POSTECH). He worked as a senior scientist and biomaterials research leader at AgResearch from July 2003 to April 2013. In 2013, he joined as a senior lecturer at the University of Otago, Dunedin Campus. Currently he works as associate Professor and Director, Bioengineering program and Centre for Bioengineering & Nanomedecine (Dunedin Hub).

== Scientific publications ==
Ali has authored over 123 publications in scientific journals. Ali was one of three authors of an article published in 2017 in Spectrochimica Acta Part A: Molecular and Biomolecular Spectroscopy, which was withdrawn after the Editors concluded that the acceptance of this article was based upon the positive advice of at least one illegitimate reviewer report. The report was submitted from an email account which was provided to the journal as a suggested reviewer during the submission of the article. Although purportedly a real reviewer account, the Editors concluded that this was not of an appropriate, independent reviewer. Journal records also indicated that a non-genuine email address was provided for the corresponding co-author and the individual listed as the corresponding co-author did not receive any correspondence from the journal throughout the submission process.

== Membership ==
- American Chemical Society
- Materials Research Society
