= Rabiul Hussain =

Bangladeshi poet and architect (1943–2019)

- Born: 31 January 1943; Jhenaidah, Bengal Presidency, British India
- Died: 26 November 2019 (aged 76); Dhaka, Bangladesh
- Education: Bangladesh University of Engineering and Technology
- Awards: Bangla Academy Literary Award (2009); Ekushey Padak (2018)

Rabiul Hussain (31 January 1943 – 26 November 2019) was a Bangladeshi poet and architect. He was one of the trustees of the Bangladesh Liberation War Museum. He was awarded Bangla Academy Literary Award in 2009 for poetry. In recognition of his contribution to Bengali language and literature, the government of Bangladesh awarded him the country's second highest civilian award Ekushey Padak in 2018.

== Early life ==
Rabiul was born on 31 January 1943 in Ratidanga village of Shailkupa Thana in Jhenaidah Subdivision. He grew up in Kushtia. He completed his secondary education from Kushtia Muslim High School and higher secondary education from Kushtia College. He was later admitted to the then East Pakistan University of Engineering and Technology (now Bangladesh University of Engineering and Technology). In 1968, he obtained a bachelor's degree in architecture from the same university.

== Awards ==
- Bangla Academy Literary Award (2009)
- Ekushey Padak (2018)
