= M. Anwar Hossain =

Bangladeshi scientist, writer, and politician

M Anwar Hossain
- মো. আনোয়ার হোসেন
- Born: 20 August 1949 (age 77); Sylhet, East Bengal, Pakistan
- Education: University of Dhaka; Kyoto University
- Scientific career
- Workplaces: University of Dhaka; Kyoto University; Kyoto Prefectural University; Purdue University; Japan Advanced Institute of Science and Technology; Jahangirnagar University; North South University

M Anwar Hossain (born 20 August 1949) is a Bangladeshi scientist, writer, and politician. He is a professor at the Department of Biochemistry and Molecular Biology of University of Dhaka and a member of the Standing Committee of the Jatiya Samajtantrik Dal. He was the 14th vice chancellor of Jahangirnagar University and the former president of the Dhaka University Teachers' Association (DUTA) and Bangladesh Society of Biochemistry and Molecular Biology. Hossain was a freedom fighter of the Bangladesh Liberation War of 1971 during which he served as a staff officer of sector 11. Hossain has been detained and imprisoned twice by military rulers of Bangladesh and has been described by Senator Edward Kennedy as a 'prisoner of conscience'.

== Family and early life ==
Hossain was born in the Juri Station of Sylhet on 20 August 1949 to his parents Mohiuddin Ahmed and Begum Ashrafunnessa. Mohiuddin who began his career as an apprentice of the British Railway was serving as station master of Juri when Anwar was born. Anwar had three sisters and eight brothers. Eight of the eleven brothers and sisters actively participated in the Liberation War of Bangladesh in 1971. Four of Anwar's brothers, Lt. Colonel Abu Taher, Abu Yusuf Khan, Shakhawat Hossain Bahar and Waresat Hussain Belal, were awarded the Bir Uttam, Bir Bikram, Bir Protik and Bir Protik respectively.

== Career ==
=== Academic ===
Anwar obtained his bachelor's and master's from the Department of Biochemistry and Molecular Biology at the University of Dhaka in 1971 and 1972 respectively. He did his MSc thesis under the supervision of Kamaluddin Ahmad. Anwar joined Department of Biochemistry and Molecular Biology at the University of Dhaka as a lecturer on 1 January 1975. In 1982 Anwar was awarded a Monbukagakusho Scholarship with which he pursued doctoral studies at Kyoto University, Japan under the supervision of Kozi Asada. His Ph.D. thesis was titled "Photosynthesis: Plant's Defence Mechanism Against Photo-Oxidative Damage” and was awarded the degree in 1985. He became an assistant professor at 1985 and associate professor at 1990. From 1994 to till date he is working as a selection grade professor in the Department of Biochemistry and Molecular Biology, University of Dhaka. He was Chairman of the Department from 2001 to 2003. Hossain was elected as Dean of the Biological Sciences and the Founding Project Director of Dhaka University's Department of Biotechnology and Genetic Engineering. Currently he is also teaching in Biochemistry and Microbiology Department in North South University. He has, in the past, served as the elected General Secretary and President of the Dhaka University Teachers' Association (DUTA) for multiple terms. Hossain was elected as the vice-chancellor of Jahangirnagar University (JU) on 17 July 2012, a position which he served till January 2014.

=== Research ===
Hossain has conducted research with world renowned plant scientists, among whom are Joseph C. Arthur Distinguished Professor of Plant Physiology and Emeritus Professor of Botany and Plant Pathology of Purdue University Thomas K Hodges, Japanese plant physiologist and Professor Emeritus of Kyoto University Kozi Asada, former president of the Australian Academy of Science Jim Peacock and Professor Kamaluddin Ahmad. With over 1400 citations, Hossain is one of the most cited plant scientists in Bangladesh. His works have appeared in premier scientific journals including the Journal of Biological Chemistry, Plant Physiology, Plant Molecular Biology and Plant and Cell Physiology. Hossain serves in the Editorial Board of Bioresearch Communications. After his PhD he returned to Bangladesh for 2–3 years, and then again went to Kyoto Prefectural University as a part of a Biotechnology Career Fellowship Program (1987–1990). This time he studied plant genetic engineering.

From 1991 to 1994 and 1995–1996 he worked at Purdue University, USA and Kyoto University, Japan respectively as visiting scientist (full-time professor) during which he worked for developing submergence (flood) tolerant rice.

After the fall of the Sheikh Hasina led Awami League government, Hossain was assaulted outside Shahjalal International Airport on 9 August 2024. The attackers allegedly said, "You spoke against Jamaat. We're going to slit your throat." In May 2025, an attempted murder case was filed against him over a student of Alia Madrasa getting injured in Old Dhaka during protests against former Prime Minister Sheikh Hasina in August 2024.

== Awards ==
1. Japanese Monbusho Scholarship in 1982
2. University Grants Commission (UGC) Award 1985 for the research paper entitled, 'Monodehydroascorbate reductase from cucumber is a flavin adenine dinucleotide enzyme' which was adjudged as the best publication in 1985 in fundamental research in the field of Biological Sciences in Bangladesh.
3. The Rockefeller Foundation Biotechnology Career Fellowship in 1987.
4. The Rockefeller Foundation Visiting Scientist Fellowship in 1991.
5. Justice Ibrahim Gold Medal for the year 1993 for outstanding research in Biological Sciences.
6. Visiting professorship in Kyoto University, Japan in 1995.

== Literature ==
Hossain's columns have appeared in leading national dailies such as bdnews24, Janakantha, Kaler Kantho, and Samakal. He has written four books.
