= Khandaker Mustahidur Rahman =

Bangladeshi academic (1949-2021)

Professor Khondkar Mustahidur Rahman

Vice-Chancellor

Jahangirnagar University
- In office 2004–2008
- Preceded by: Jasim Uddin Ahmed
- Succeeded by: Md. Moniruzzaman

Personal details
- Born: 1949 Brahmanbaria, Bangladesh
- Died: August 2021 (aged 71–72)
- Education: University of Dhaka; University of Islamabad
- Occupation: Professor, University Administrator

Khondkar Mustahidur Rahman (1949 – August 20, 2021) was a Bangladeshi academic, professor of the economics, and vice-chancellor of Jahangirnagar University.

== Early life ==
Rahman was born in 1949 in Bilkenduai village, Brahmanbaria. His father, Khondkar Shamsur Rahman, was a minister in the then East Pakistan government.

Rahman completed his SSC and HSC at the Dhaka Collegiate School in 1964 and 1965 respectively. He studied at the University of Dhaka, and graduated with a master's in economics from the University of Islamabad in 1969. As an active member of the Students' Union, he played a significant role in the 1969 Mass Uprising. He finished his PhD in 1973.

== Career ==
On 4 January 1971, Rahman joined the Department of Economics at Jahangirnagar University as a lecturer, being one of the first six teachers at the university. He conducted the university's first economics class on 12 January 1971, marking the beginning of academic activities at Jahangirnagar University. He remained engaged in teaching in the Economics Department until his retirement.

Rahman served as the Vice-Chancellor of Jahangirnagar University from 2004 to 2008. Rahman was a member of the Bangladesh Sammilito Peshajibi Parishad, a professional body linked to the Bangladesh Nationalist Party.

== Personal life ==
Rahman's daughter, Tasmina Rahman, is a lecturer of pharmacy at Jahangirnagar University.

== Death ==
Rahman died on 20 August 2021 in Dhaka while undergoing treatment at Islami Bank General Hospital for COVID-19. Mirza Fakhrul Islam Alamgir, general secretary of the Bangladesh Nationalist Party, expressed shock at his death.
