= Jasim Uddin Ahmed =

Bangladeshi language activist (1933–2022)

- Born: January 1, 1933; Galiarchar, Daudkandi, Presidency of Fort William in Bengal, British Raj
- Died: September 21, 2022 (aged 89); Bangkok, Thailand
- Education: Ph.D.University of Michigan, Ann Arbor, M.S.University of Rochester
- Awards: Ekushey Padak (2016)

Jasim Uddin Ahmed (1 January 1933 – 21 September 2022) was a Bangladeshi language activist, nuclear physicist, poet and author. He received the Ekushey Padak award in 2016 for his contribution to the Language Movement.

== Biography ==
Ahmed was born on 1 January 1933 in Galiarchar, Daudkandi of Comilla. He was an integral part of the Language Movement while a student at Dhaka University. He was on the front line of the protest rallies on 21 February 1952. During these demonstrations, the police opened fire on the crowd, and Abul Barkat, who was standing beside him, was fatally shot.

Ahmed started his academic career at Dhaka College in 1956 before moving to the United States for his M.S. at the University of Rochester, and his Ph.D. at the University of Michigan. He joined the Atomic Energy Centre, Dhaka in 1963 and moved to the International Atomic Energy Agency in Vienna, Austria in 1970. He eventually became the head of the Nuclear Radiation Security Department of the institution. He retired from the post in 1994.

Ahmed has written about 36 books, and received the Ekushey Padak in 2016 for his contribution to the Language Movement. He made a special appearance on a television drama titled Noishobdo Joddha which was broadcast on 19 February 2016 on ATN Bangla.

== Death ==
Ahmed died on 21 September 2022 in Bangkok Hospital, Thailand.
