= Syedpur, Jagannathpur =

Syedpur সৈয়দপুর
- Village
- Location within Bangladesh
- Coordinates: 24.758723°N 91.592572°E
- Country: Bangladesh
- Division: Sylhet
- District: Sunamganj
- Upazila: Jagannathpur
- Union Council: 7 No. Syedpur-Shaharpara Union Parishad)
- Time zone: UTC+6 (BST)
- Postal code: 3061
- Website: https://www.syedpur.net

Syedpur (Bengali: সৈয়দপুর), is a historic and prominent village located in the Jagannathpur Upazila, Sunamganj District. It is recognized as the largest village in the Sunamganj District and is noted for its deep spiritual heritage, academic contributions, and complex lineage systems. The village is named after its founder Syed Shamsuddin, a descendant of the Islamic prophet Muhammad through Husayn Ibn Ali. Syed Shamsuddin was also a disciple of Shah Jalal, who arrived here in the 14th century.

== Etymology ==
The village was originally known as Krishnapur. Following the arrival of the Sufi saint Hazrat Syed Shah Shamsuddin (r) in the 14th century, the village was renamed Syedpur, adopting the first part of the saint's name.

== History ==
Ancient and Medieval Periods Historically, the region was part of the Lauṛ Kingdom, which was once larger than the neighboring Jaintia and Gaur kingdoms. During the 12th century, a provincial administrator named Vijay Manikya declared independence from Lauṛ, establishing the kingdom of Pandua (modern-day Pedua, where the Jagannathpur health center is located).

In 1303 AD (703 Hijri), the Sufi saint Hazrat Shah Jalal arrived in Sylhet with 360 companions. Under his direction, eight saints traveled to Jagannathpur to spread Islamic teachings. These eight included Hazrat Syed Shah Shamsuddin (r), who settled in Syedpur. Local lore records the marriage of Shah Shamsuddin to Malati (renamed Maleka), a local woman who converted to Islam following a miraculous event

Administrative Evolution Under the revenue reforms of Murshid Kuli Khan in 1722, Syedpur became part of Atuajan Pargana. During the British colonial era, a major revenue survey known as the "Hustabodh" survey (1788–90) was conducted under Resident Magistrate John Willes. This survey bypassed large zamindars to settle land directly with occupants, dividing Syedpur into eleven ancestral "Taluks". In 1877, it became part of the newly created Sunamganj Mohkuma (sub-division).

== Administration and Lineages ==
The social structure of Syedpur is defined by its eleven Taluks, ten of which belong to the descendants of Hazrat Shah Shamsuddin. These descendants predominantly trace their lineage through his two sons, Syed Shah Hossain and Syed Shah Mohammad.

- The Eleven Taluks:
  - Taluk 23–32: Designated for the Syed branches (including families like the Chowdhury of Taluk 23).
  - Taluk 33 (Md. Shafi Beg): The only non-Syed taluk, settled by the Mirza or Beg family.
- Other Lineages:
  - Secondary Syed Branches: Descendants of Shah Shamsuddin’s brothers, Hazrat Tajuddin and Hazrat Ruknuddin (the latter's lineage includes the poet Pir Syed Shahnoor).
  - Syed Phul (Samarkandi) Lineage: Descendants of Hazrat Syed Omar Samarkandi, another companion of Shah Jalal.
  - Non-Syed Clans: Significant families include the Sheikh (Qureshi), Mallick, Khan, Shikdar, and the Haji Bari (descendants of Shaykh Mazum).

== Education ==
=== High school ===
- Syedpur Pilot High School: Founded in 1963 through community efforts, it was initially staffed by volunteers who taught without salary

=== College ===
- Syedpur Adarsha College
- Syedpur Shamsia Alia Madrasa: Founded in 1903, it is one of the oldest religious institutions in the district
- Syedpur Hafizia Husainiya Arabia Madrasah: Established in 1940, it is a major center for higher Islamic studies (Dawra-e-Hadith)

== Notable people ==
- Syeda Shahar Banu (1914-1983), language activist.
- Dr. Sirajul Islam Quraishi: The first individual from the village to earn a PhD
- Maulana Syed Jamilul Huq: A leader in the Khilafat Movement and the first Chairman of the local Union Council
- Pir Syed Shahnoor: A 19th-century mystic poet and author of the Sufi text Noor Nasihat
- Master Syed Hafizur Rahman: The first Muslim graduate from Jagannathpur Thana
- Syed Shahadat Hossain: A celebrated novelist and former editor of the Daily Azad
- Syed Abdul Jabbar (Tera Shah): A legendary Baul and mystic poet of the mid-20th century

== See also ==
- Islampur
- Shaharpara
- Syedpur Shaharpara Union
