= Shaharpara =

Village in Sylhet Division, Bangladesh

Coordinates: 24.75°N 91.62°E

Shaharpara (Bengali: শাহারপাড়া) is a village of historical importance in the south-eastern part of Sunamganj District, Bangladesh. It was founded in 1315 CE by Shah Kamal Quhafah and his disciples. It is approximately one hour drive away from the city of Sylhet and also from Sunamganj. The village is at the heart of the Sylhet Division and nestles on the bank of the river Ratna.

It is located about two hours' drive from Sylhet city and Sunamganj and about an hour's drive from Jagannathpur Upazila. The traditional village of Shaharpara is bordered by Balampur and Buriya villages to the south, Shapati Haor to the north, Tilak to the east, and Audat village to the west.

== Etymology ==
The name Shaharpara derived from the title of its founder, Shah Kamal. 'Shah' means 'monarch', 'ar' (variant of 'er') means 'of' and 'para' means 'village' or 'footstep'; Shaharpara is a compound of Shah, ar and para (Shah+ar+para=Shaharpara), which is attributed to the footsteps of Shah Kamal Quhafah. Literal meaning of Shaharpara is 'footsteps of Shah', referring to the footsteps of Shah Kamal. It was when Shah Kamal Quhafah alighted himself on an island to survey the terrain for settlement and when a settlement was established, it inherited the phrase 'Shaharpara' as an honour for the settlement and ascription to Shah Kamal Quhafah.

== Origin of Shaharpara ==
Shaharpara is a village that nestles on the bank of river Ratna in Syedpur Shaharpara Union Parishad, Jagannathpur upazila, Sunamganj district, Sylhet Division of Bangladesh. In 1315 CE, Shah Kamal Quhafah established a settlement on a group of islands in Ratnang Sea. Nowadays, it lies on the bank of river Ratna (river Ratna is a remnant of erstwhile Ratnang Sea). The settlement of Shah Kamal Quhafah became an epicentre for spiritual occurrence, academic and esoteric learning. Gradually, it transformed into a mega village enticing a number of adjoining islets when they transmuted into hamlets: Kamalshahi, Tilak, Mirpur, Muftirchawk, Nurainpur, Lalarchar, Kurikiyar and Noagaon. From ancient to medieval periods, Jagannathpur upazila and all of its bordering upazilas were submerged in a vast sea by the name of Ratnag.

=== Kamalshahi ===
Kamalshahi (Bengali: কামালশাহী), a.k.a. Kamalshah, was founded by Shah Muazzamuddin Qureshi and it was named in honour of his father, Shah Kamal Quhafah. Kamalshahi was the capital of Muazzamabad and centre of academic and esoteric learning. At present, Kamalshahi has lost its past grandeur, but mausoleums of Shah Kamal Quhafa, his wife and children are sites for historical and archaeological interests.

=== Tilak ===
Tilak (Bengali: তিলক্) was a settlement established by kith and kin of ‘Moi’ or ‘Mai’, who was a female disciple of Shah Kamal Quhafah. Family and friends of Moi came to Shaharpara from Moi’erchar or Moiyarchar in southwest of Sylhet and they established a settlement on an islet of Shaharpara archipelago, which later came to be known as 'Tilak', as Moi's family belong to a Brahmanic denomination that required them wearing a mark on their forehead called, tilak, and the settlement later derived its name from that insignia on their forehead. At present, Tilak is considered as a hamlet of Greater Shaharpara.

=== Muftirchawk ===
Muftirchawk (Bengali: মুফতিরচক) was an estate of Mufti Da’eem Uddin Qureshi of Mullah Barhi and it was named after his appellation of mufti. Mufti Da’eem Uddin Qureshi returned to Shaharpara on vacations and married his paternal cousin. Descendants of Mufti Da’eem Uddin Qureshi have settled in Dargah Mahalla, Sylhet. Mufti Da’eem Uddin Qureshi's eldest son, Maulana Zia Uddin Qureshi, was a philanthropist, who founded the very first school in Sylhet.

=== Nurainpur ===
Nurainpur (Bengali: নুরাইনপুর) is a hamlet within the periphery of Shaharpara; it was established by Shah Nurain Uddin Qureshi and thus named after him. Shah Nurain Uddin Qureshi was a descendant of Shah Kamal Quhafah; he was a social activist, who dedicated most of his life for welfare of people and societal improvement.

=== Mirpur ===
Mirpur (Bengali: মিরপুর) hosted a garrison from the formation of Muazzamabad until it was annexed and absorbed by the Mughal Empire of Delhi.

=== Consanguinity ===
People of Shaharpara are related to each other; this is because most of them have descended from three sons of Shah Kamal Quḥāfah and their surnames are Shah, Khwaja, Kamali or Kamaly, Qureshi, Mufti and Siddiqui after their ancestor Shah Kamal Quḥāfah, who settled on the bank of river Ratna and founded a village that was named "Shaharpara" (derived from his first name). Family ties and relations with other clans are strikingly similar to that of the Arab tribes. Descendants of Shah Kamal Quhafah have extended to five families: Mullah Family, Baglar Family and Shahjee Family in Shaharpara, Qureshi Family in Patli and Mufti Family in Sylhet Dargah Mahallah. Maulana Shah Shamsuddin Qureshi, who was a descendant of Shah Kamal Quhafah, established the Qureshi Family in Patli and Maulana Shah Zia Uddin, another descendant of Shah Kamal Quhafah, established the Mufti Family in Dargah Mahallah, Sylhet. Today the Kamali population stands at approximately 5000 and most of them have immigrated to western countries for a better life, but they maintain a website that aims to bring the clan members together.

== History ==
Hazrat Shah Kamal Kohafah, his wife and 12 companions, along with his disciples, set out for the Sunamganj border in June 1315 AD. Due to adverse weather conditions, the journey was halted at a place called Moiarchar or Moirchar and they preached religion in that area for many days, focusing on the Moiarchar area. After staying here for a few days, they resumed their journey; however, due to adverse weather conditions, they cancelled the northward journey and continued to move west. The place where they took a break was named after Hazrat Shah Kamal Kohafah, which is now within Kamal Bazaar and Bishwanath Upazila. Reaching Kamal Bazaar, they preached the word of religion there for a few days. Finally, Hazrat Shah Kamal Kohafah discovered an island-shaped high ground (small island) in the area near the shore of the Ratnag Sea, went ashore and anchored there, later he established a shelter on that high ground. That land settlement gradually became a village. The village was named 'Shaharpara' after Hazrat Shah Kamal Kohafah. At that time, there was a huge Ratnakar in the western part of the Sylhet division; islands newly emerging from the rocks on the shore of that Ratnakar were formed and eventually those islands were transformed into villages.

The names of the 12 companions and disciples of the saint are mentioned below: 1. Syed Shamsuddin – in Mokampara, Syedpur village, Jagannathpur upazila, Sunamganj district; 2. Syed Tajuddin – in Tajpur village, Balaganj upazila, Sylhet district; 3. Syed Bahauddin – in Mukan Bazar, Golabganj upazila, Sylhet district; 4. Syed Rukunuddin – in Kadam Hati, Moulbi Bazar district; 5. Shah Jalaluddin – in Kusipur or Kuskipur, Balaganj upazila, Sylhet district; 6. Syed Ziauddin – in Mukan Bazar, Golabganj upazila, Sylhet district; 7. Shah Kala Manik – in Manihara village, Jagannathpur upazila, Sunamganj district; 8. Shah Kalu Pir – in Pirergaon, Jagannathpur upazila, Sunamganj district; 9. Shah Chand – in Chandavrang village of Bishwanath upazila of Sylhet district; 10. Shah Shamsuddin Bihari – in Atghar village of Jagannathpur upazila of Sunamganj district; 11. Shah Daor Bakhsh Khatib – in Daorshahi or Daorai village; and 12. Shah Faizullah – in Faizi or Feji village. All these Sufi saints used to preach the word of religion from their Shaharpara asana. As a result, Shaharparai became the center of Islam and Islam spread throughout Sunamganj and Mymensingh districts from this Shaharpara. As a result of their tireless efforts, the people of the Gabor and Nireshwar communities came to believe in one God. By lineage

The descendants of Hazrat Shah Kamal Uddin Kohafah (Rah) are settled in three or four places in Sylhet division of Bangladesh. Namely, they have settled in Shaharpara, Patli Aurangabad and Dargah Mahallah areas. Outside Bangladesh, the people of this lineage have settled permanently in these countries after migrating to Yokta Rajya and Yoktarashta. The first son of Hazrat Shah Kamal Uddin Kohafah (Rah) was Hazrat Shah Jalal Uddin Qureshi (Rah), the second son was Hazrat Shah Jamal Uddin Qureshi (Rah) and the third son was Hazrat Shah Moazzam Uddin alias Rukan Uddin Qureshi (Rah). The first son has no lineage, the second son's subordinate descendants are the people of six tribes of Shaharpara. Respectively: 1. Molla Goshti, 2. Shahji Goshti, 3. Bagla clan, 4. Sadrdi clan, 5. Sheikh Bahadi clan, 6/ Sheikh Farid clan.

Khadim clan is the descendant of Shah Kamal Uddin Kohafah (RA)'s younger son Rukunuddin alias Moazzam Uddin. In addition, there are descendants of Shah Kamal Uddin Kohafah (RA) in Shaharpara. Many are descendants of Shah Kamal Uddin Rah through their mother's right through marriage.

Note: In accordance with the name of Hazrat Shah Kamal Uddin Kohafah (RA), the people of the above-mentioned clans and lineages write Kamali after their names

== Economy ==
Greater Shaharpara has a number of markets, emporiums and bazaar where people from neighbouring villages and beyond trade. Shaharpara Bazaar is largest amongst other bazaar in the area.

== Education ==
Shaharpara has a number of primary schools, one seminary by the name of Shah Kamal Madrasa and one high school by the name of Shaharpara Shah Kamal High School.

== See also ==
- List of villages in Bangladesh
- Jagannathpur Upazila
- Syedpur Shaharpara Union
- Budhrail
- Islampur, Jagannathpur
