= Mohammad Kamrul Ahsan =

Bangladeshi academic

- মোহাম্মদ কামরুল আহসান
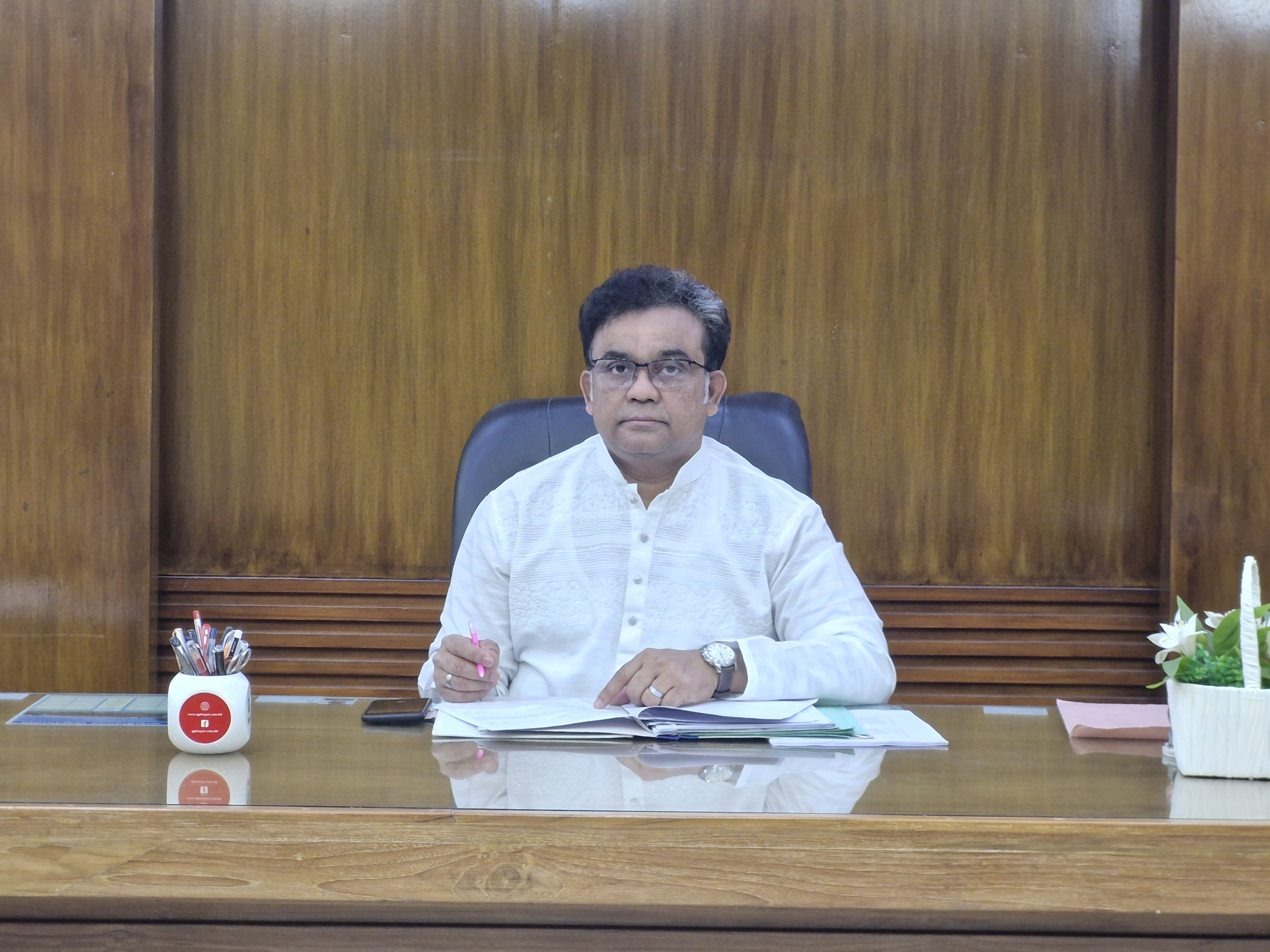
- Ahsan in 2025

Vice-Chancellor of Jahangirnagar University
- In office 8 September 2024 – 26 September 2026
- Preceded by: Md. Nurul Alam
- Succeeded by: Md. Nurul Islam

Personal details
- Born: 20 January 1969 (age 57) Lakshmipur, East Pakistan, Pakistan
- Education: Jahangirnagar University (BA, MA); Sofia University (MA); Cardiff University (PhD)
- Occupation: Academic

Mohammad Kamrul Ahsan (born 20 January 1969) is a Bangladeshi academic. He is a professor in the Department of Philosophy and former Vice-Chancellor of Jahangirnagar University.

== Early life and education ==
Kamrul Ahsan was born on 20 January 1969 in Lakshmipur, Bangladesh, to Mohammad Abdus Sobhan and Mahfuza Begum. He completed his Secondary School Certificate (SSC) from Aruail Bohumukhi High School, Brahmanbaria, and his Higher Secondary Certificate (HSC) from Ramganj Government College, Lakshmipur.

Ahsan earned his bachelor's degree in 1989 and a master's degree in 1990, both from the Department of Philosophy at Jahangirnagar University. In 2000, he obtained a second master's degree from Sofia University, Bulgaria, and later earned his PhD from Cardiff University, UK, in 2013.

== Career ==
Ahsan began his academic career as a lecturer in the Department of Philosophy at Jahangirnagar University in 1993. He was promoted to assistant professor in 1997, associate professor in 2003, and full professor in 2013. Throughout his tenure, he has held various administrative positions, including membership on the Senate, Syndicate, and Academic Council. He served as the Provost of Begum Khaleda Zia Hall, Chairman of the Department of Philosophy, and General Secretary of the Teachers' Association. He was the President of the Jatiyatabadi Shikkhak Forum, a pro-Bangladesh Nationalist Party teachers organization.

On 5 September 2024, Ahsan was appointed as the Vice-Chancellor of Jahangirnagar University and assumed office on 8 September 2024.

Ahsan is a member of the Asiatic Society of Bangladesh. He served as the General Secretary of the Bangladesh Philosophical Association and as the president of the Jahangirnagar University unit of the Nationalist Teachers’ Forum.
