= Akhtar Imam =

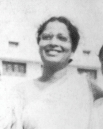
- Imam in 1954
- Born: 30 December 1917; Dhaka, Bengal Presidency, British India
- Died: 22 June 2009 (aged 91); Dhaka, Bangladesh
- Education: Bethune College; University of Dhaka; University College London

Akhtar Imam (Bengali: আখতার ইমাম; 30 December 1917 – 22 June 2009) was a Bangladeshi educationist, feminist and social activist.

== Early life ==
Imam was born on 30 December 1917 in Narinda, Old Dhaka. She completed her matriculation and intermediate exams from Eden Girl's High School and Intermediate College, Dhaka in 1933 and 1935 respectively. In 1937, she completed her honors in philosophy from Bethune College of Calcutta University. She was awarded the Gangamani Devi Medal for being first in her batch. In 1946, she finished her master's degree in philosophy from the University of Dhaka. In 1952 she was awarded a scholarship from the Bengal Muslim Education Fund by the Pakistan Government in 1952 to pursue higher education outside the country. She completed her masters in philosophy at the University College London under the tutelage of A. J. Ayer and S. V. Keeling. From 1963 to 1965 she conducted further research in philosophy at the University of Nottingham.

== Career ==
After completing her studies she joined her old alma mater, Eden College, as a lecturer. She taught there from the mid-1940s to 1956. She transferred to Dhaka College as a professor. She was the first female professor of Dhaka College and would go one to become the first female head of a department in the college. In 1953, she joined the University of Dhaka as a part-time teacher at the philosophy department. She became the first female teacher of the university. She was also selected as Reader in the department of philosophy in 1956. On 1 September 1956, she became the first permanent provost of Rokeya Hall, the women's dormitory in the same university.

In 1968, she became the first female head of the philosophy department. In 1968, she was elected general president of the Pakistan Philosophical Congress in its 15th session, the first woman to be hold that position. She was also the secretary and treasurer for one term. She was the first convener of Bangladesh Philosophical Association and a member of Bangladesh Philosophical Congress. She served as the president of 'Bangladesh Lekhika Shangha' for three years. She was the president of Hemantika, a charity for the welfare of senior women. She had written a number of books on philosophy.

== Personal life ==
Imam had three children. Her husband died when she was 25 years old. Imam died on 22 June 2009. Her name was etched on the Wall of Honour at the Royal Society of Medicine in London.
