= Md. Nurul Alam =

Bangladeshi academic

- নূরুল আলম

Vice-chancellor of Jahangirnagar University
- In office 13 September 2022 – 7 August 2024
- Preceded by: Farzana Islam
- Succeeded by: Mohammad Kamrul Ahsan

Personal details
- Born: 1957 (age 68–69) Dhamrai, East Pakistan, Pakistan
- Education: Jahangirnagar University (Ph.D.)

Md. Nurul Alam is a Bangladeshi academic and a former Vice-chancellor of Jahangirnagar University served during 2022–2024. He is a professor of physics at the same university. He served as the Jahangirnagar University Teachers' Association president for three terms.

== Early life ==
Alam was born in 1957 in Dhamrai Upazila, Dhaka District, East Pakistan, Pakistan. He did his bachelor's degree and masters in physics at Jahangirnagar University in 1976 and 1977 respectively. He did his PhD in economics in 1996 at Jahangirnagar University.

== Career ==
Alam was a research fellow from 1 December 1980 to 30 November 1981 of the Department of Physics at Jahangirnagar University. On 28 April 1982, Alam became a lecturer at Jahangirnagar University. He was promoted to assistant professor on 1 July 1986. He was promoted to associate professor on 1 September 1992. He was promoted to professor on 3 October 1997 and appointed to the academic council. From 28 May 1998 to 20 November 2001, he was the Provost of Mir Mosharraf Hossain Hall.

Alam served as the Jahangirnagar University Teachers' Association president from January 2005 to December 2005. He was the Controller of Examination from 7 July 2008 to 19 July 2010. From 28 July 2009 to 11 June 2010, he was the Principal of Jahangirnagar University School and College. He served as the Jahangirnagar University Teachers' Association president from January 2011 to December 2011. From July 2011 to July 2012, he was the President of the Federation of Bangladesh University Teachers Association.

Alam was appointed Pro-Vice-Chancellor of Jahangirnagar University on 14 August 2016. Alam served as the Jahangirnagar University Teachers' Association president from 1 March 2018 to 30 December 2018.

Alam was appointed Vice-Chancellor of Jahangirnagar University in September 2022 by President Mohammad Abdul Hamid. He replaced Farzana Islam as Vice-Chancellor. He was sent a legal notice asking him to step down due to him being overage. In November 2022, Mohammad Ali Akand Mamun, a former Botany professor, lodged a complaint with the Anti-Corruption Commission against Alam. He opened a new Cell Culture and Synthetic Biology Lab at the university.
