= A S M Abdul Haseeb =

Bangladeshi academic and 1st Vice-Chancellor of the Dhaka Central University

A S Md. Abdul Haseeb

Vice-Chancellor of Dhaka Central University
- In office 15 February 2026 – 16 March 2026
- Chancellor: Mohammed Shahabuddin
- Preceded by: Office established
- Succeeded by: Md. Nurul Islam

Personal details
- Born: c. 1961 Bangladesh
- Education: KU Leuven
- Occupation: Professor, university administrator

A S Md. Abdul Haseeb is a professor in the Department of Nanomaterials and Ceramic Engineering at the Bangladesh University of Engineering and Technology. He was appointed as the first Vice-Chancellor of Dhaka Central University.

== Education ==
Abdul Haseeb received his bachelor's and master's degrees in metallurgical engineering from the Bangladesh University of Engineering and Technology (BUET) in 1984 and 1986, respectively. He later completed a PhD in materials engineering from KU Leuven in Belgium in 1992.

== Career ==
From December 2006 to June 2022, Haseeb served as a professor in the Department of mechanical engineering at the University of Malaya in Kuala Lumpur, Malaysia. At the same university, he was the dean of the Innovative Industry and Sustainability Research Cluster under the Institute of Research Management and Monitoring from 2013 to 2022.

In 2021, he also served as the acting associate vice-chancellor (industry and community engagement) of the University of Malaya. Earlier, he served as the head of the Department of Mechanical Engineering at the University of Malaya and as a professor and head of the Department of Materials and Metallurgical Engineering at the Bangladesh University of Engineering and Technology (BUET).

In 2026, he was appointed as the first vice-chancellor of Dhaka Central University, which was established as the fifth autonomous university in Dhaka.

=== Research interests ===
His main research areas include semiconducting oxide–based nanostructures, gas sensing technologies, electronic packaging materials, and the degradation of materials in harsh environments.

== Professional memberships ==
He is a Fellow of the Institution of Mechanical Engineers (United Kingdom) and a Chartered Engineer of the Engineering Council. He is also a member of the U.S.-based The Minerals, Metals & Materials Society (TMS) and the Institute of Electrical and Electronics Engineers (IEEE).

== Editorial activities ==
He is the editor-in-chief of the Elsevier-published Encyclopedia of Materials: Electronics. He is also the founding editor-in-chief of the Journal of Research Governance and Management and serves as a regional editor of the Taylor & Francis journal Advances in Materials and Processing Technologies (AMPT). In addition, he is a member of the editorial board of the ASEAN Engineering Journal.

== Fellowships and international recognition ==
As part of his international recognition in research, he has received several fellowships in different countries. These include the European Research Fellowship at the Department of Materials, University of Oxford, United Kingdom, in 2006; the Alexander von Humboldt Fellowship at the Karlsruhe Institute of Technology in Germany in 2005; the JSPS invited Research Fellowship at Kyushu University in Japan in 1999; and a Visiting Research Fellowship at the Institute of Theoretical and Applied Physical Chemistry of the National University of La Plata in Argentina in 1998.
