= Md. Nurul Islam (academic) =

Bangladeshi academic

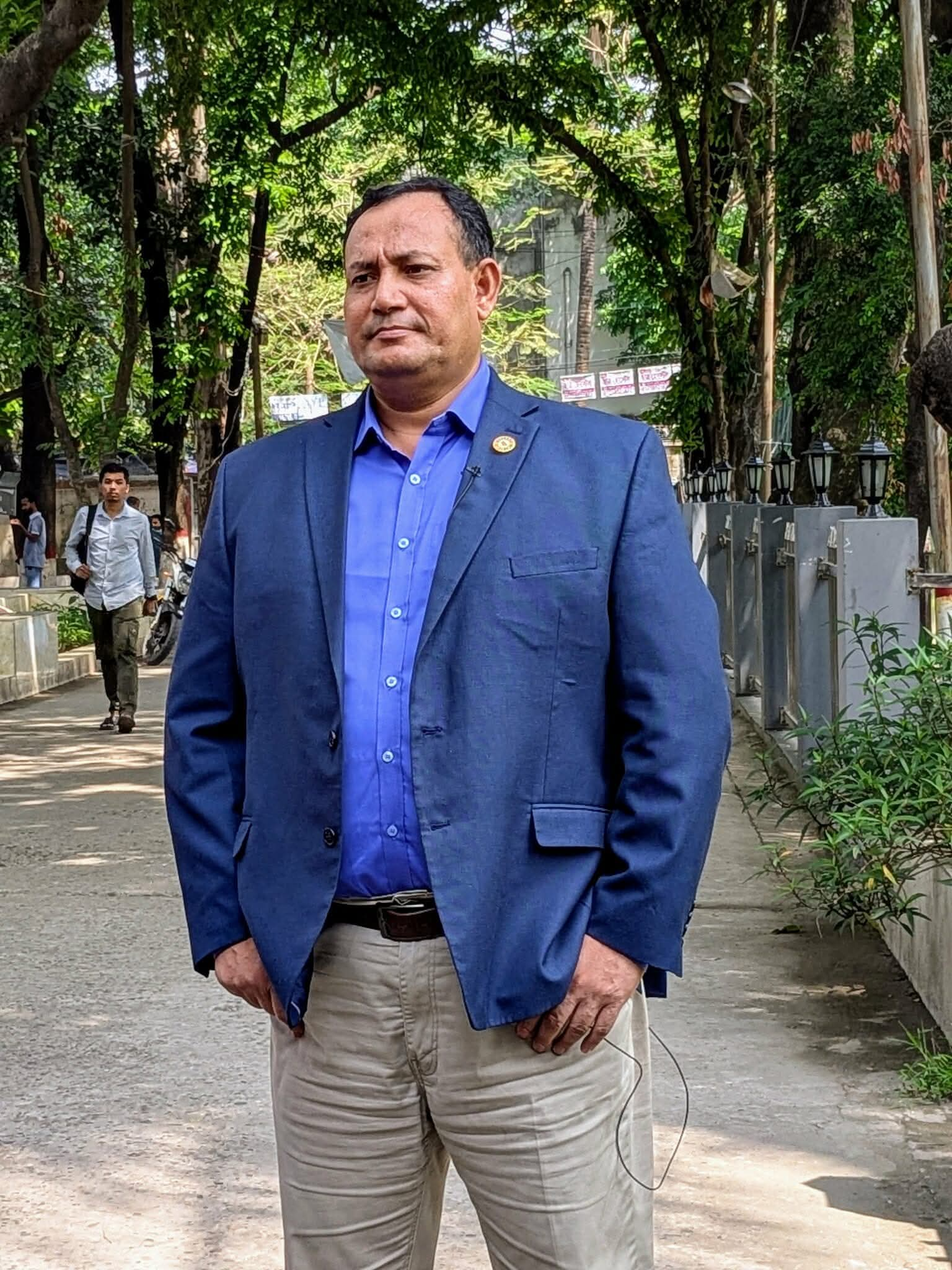
- Nurul Islam speaking on Dhaka College campus in 2026

Vice-Chancellor

Jahangirnagar University
- Incumbent
- Assumed office 26 September 2026
- Chancellor: Mirza Fakhrul Islam Alamgir
- Preceded by: Mohammad Kamrul Ahsan

Vice-Chancellor of Dhaka Central University
- In office 16 March 2026 – 26 September 2026
- Chancellor: Mohammed Shahabuddin; Mirza Fakhrul Islam Alamgir
- Preceded by: A S M Abdul Haseeb
- Succeeded by: Md. Lutfor Rahaman

Pro-Vice-Chancellor of National University of Bangladesh
- In office 03 November 2024 – 16 March 2026

Personal details
- Born: December 20, 1971 (age 54) Rajshahi, Bangladesh
- Education: Jahangirnagar University; University of Nottingham; University of Salzburg; Asian Institute of Technology
- Occupation: Professor, university administrator
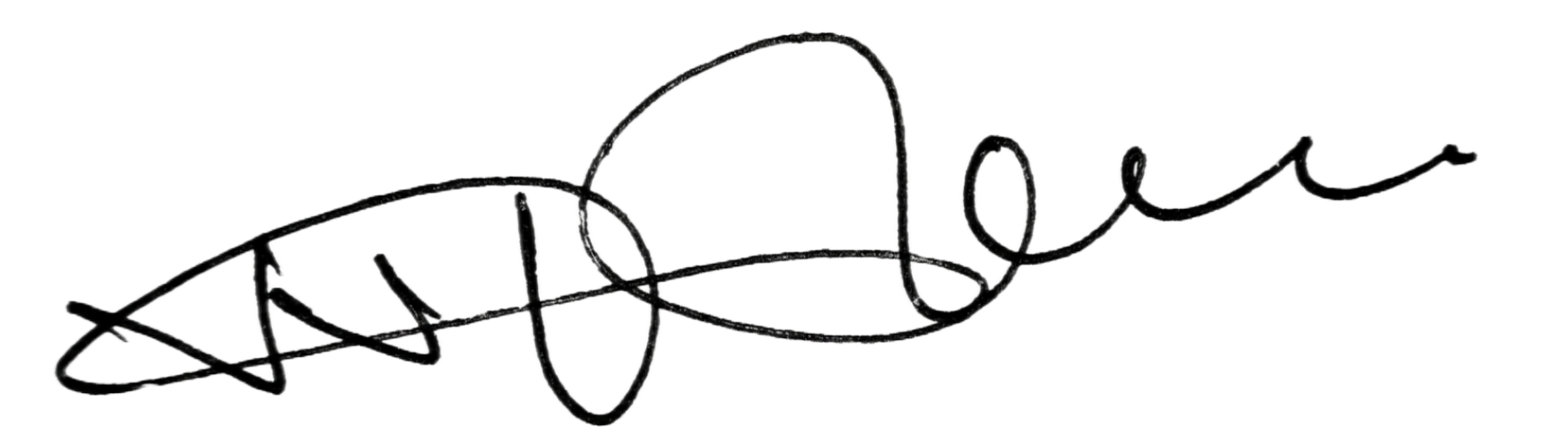
- Signature

Md. Nurul Islam (born 20 December 1971) is a Bangladeshi academic and university administrator. He is a professor in the Department of Geography and Environment at Jahangirnagar University, the current Vice-Chancellor of Jahangirnagar University. He was the second Vice-Chancellor of Dhaka Central University.

He previously served as Pro-Vice-Chancellor of the National University of Bangladesh from 3 November 2024 to 16 March 2026.

== Early life and education ==
Nurul Islam completed his Bachelor of Science (Honours) and Master of Science degrees in Geography and Environment from Jahangirnagar University, graduating with first-class results in both degrees. He later obtained a PhD from the University of Nottingham in the United Kingdom. He also completed postdoctoral research at the Flood Risk Management Research Consortium. Additionally, he received advanced training in Geographic Information Systems (GIS), remote sensing, and Environmental Impact Assessment (EIA) from the University of Salzburg in Austria, the Bose Institute in India, and the Asian Institute of Technology (AIT) in Thailand.

== Career ==
Nurul Islam began his academic career as a lecturer in the Department of Geography at University of Rajshahi and the University of Chittagong. He later joined the Department of Geography and Environment at Jahangirnagar University, where he was appointed as a professor. He also served as the Pro-Vice-Chancellor of the National University of Bangladesh. He was later appointed as the Vice-Chancellor of Dhaka Central University. Additionally, he is an honorary faculty member at the University of Nottingham in the United Kingdom.

Islam is the general secretary of the Pro-Bangladesh Nationalist Party Nationalist Teachers’ Forum unit in Jahangirnagar University.
