= Farzana Islam =

Vice-chancellor of Jahangirnagar University
- In office 2 March 2014 – 2 March 2022
- Preceded by: M. Anwar Hossain
- Succeeded by: Md. Nurul Alam

Personal details
- Born: 1957 (age 68–69) Bhedarganj Upazila, Shariatpur District, East Pakistan, Pakistan
- Education: Ph.D. (anthropology); University of Dhaka; University of Sussex
- Occupation: Academic
- Awards: Anannya Top Ten Awards (2014)

Farzana Islam (born 1957) is a Bangladeshi academic. She is a former vice-chancellor of Jahangirnagar University during 2014-2022. In 2014, she became the first female vice-chancellor of a public university in Bangladesh. She was one of the most controversial vice chancellor. She allegedly accused of different irregularities and corruption by both Students and Teachers. They also published a book. The 224-page book features reports on different irregularities and corruptions published in different newspapers.

== Education and career ==
Islam completed her master's degree in sociology from the University of Dhaka in 1980. She then joined Chittagong University as a lecturer of the Department of Sociology in 1982. In 1983, she was awarded a Commonwealth scholarship to pursue a second master's degree in the United Kingdom. However, she failed to complete her second MA. In 1986, she joined the Department of Anthropology of Jahangirnagar University. She earned her Ph.D. degree from the University of Sussex in 2001.

In March 2014, President of Bangladesh, Abdul Hamid, appointed Islam as the vice-chancellor of Jahangirnagar University. Farzana Islam made AL Advisory Council members at Awami League’s 22nd national council.

== Awards ==
- Anannya Top Ten Awards (2014)
