= Dewan Mohammad Azraf =

Bangladeshi academic (1908–1999)

- দেওয়ান মোহাম্মদ আজরফ
- Born: 25 October 1906; Teghoria, East Bengal and Assam, British India
- Died: 1 November 1999 (aged 93); Dhaka, Bangladesh
- Relatives: Hason Raja (grandfather)
- Awards: Ekushey Padak

Education
- Education: Murari Chand College; University of Dhaka

Dewan Mohammad Azraf (Bengali: দেওয়ান মোহাম্মদ আজরফ; 1908–1999) was a Bengali philosopher, teacher, author, politician, journalist and activist. In 1993, he was honoured as a National Professor in Bangladesh. He was also a supporter of the Bengali language movement. For his support of the movement, he was dismissed from the post of the principal of Sunamganj College in 1954, the same year he was promoted to the post. His support was particularly influential when he edited the Nao Belal in 1948. He was actively involved with Kaikobad Sahitya Majlish (1972–99).

Influenced by the thought of Muhammad Iqbal, he has been described as "a prolific writer" who "produced sixty monographs, over 1,000 articles in Bangla and English, 109 novels, poems, songs, and ninety short stories. His works range from literature, arts, music, and religion to philosophy."

== Early life ==
Azraf was born on 1 January 1908 into Teghoria, Sunamganj, Eastern Bengal and Assam, British Raj (now, Sylhet Division, Bangladesh) in the home of his maternal grandfather, the poet Hason Raja. He completed his schooling at the Middle English School in Duhalia. He passed BA with distinction from Murari Chand College, Sylhet in 1930 and received MA in philosophy from the University of Dhaka in 1932. As a college student, he was able get Kazi Nazrul Islam to visit Sylhet.

== Career ==
Azraf joined Sunamganj College as a teacher in 1948. Promoted to principal in 1954, he was dismissed from Sunamganj College the same year for supporting the Bengali language movement. After his dismissal, he taught at various colleges. In 1967, he was appointed the principal of Abujar Ghifari College in Dhaka, where he served till 1980. He taught part-time at the departments of philosophy and Islamic studies of the University of Dhaka from 1973 to 1990.

A supporter of Abdul Hamid Khan Bhasani, he joined the Muslim League in 1946 in protest of the treatment of Muslim immigrants in Assam, and afterward was elected to the Assam Provincial Committee. He also served 10 months of a prison sentence for violation of Section 144. He helped the formation of the Kendriya Muslim Sahitya Sangsad unit in Sylhet and served as its president from 1940 to 1943. He was a member, as well as a treasurer for some time, of the Pakistan Philosophical Congress. From 1984 to 1989, he served as the president of the Bangladesh Philosophical Association.

== Critical reception ==
Poet and researcher Musa Al Hafiz remarked about Azraf: "The central theme of Azraf’s thought was humanity and human life. He perceived human beings as vessels of immense power and potential. He envisioned a renaissance of the inner strength and beauty inherent in the human soul. His concept of the human being was that of an elevated individual. In this regard, he did not follow Kant’s theory of the 'superman'. Although he closely observed and analyzed Immanuel Kant, he found a significant gap between Kant’s 'ideal man' and his own conception of the 'ideal man'. Nevertheless, many aspects of Kant’s philosophy appealed to him. He shared a deep kinship with Muhammad Iqbal’s concept of the self (Khudi). It could be said that he pitched his intellectual tent close to Iqbal’s domain. In many ways, his tone resonated with Iqbal’s."

== Death ==
Azraf died on 1 November 1999 at a hospital in Dhaka. He was later laid to rest at the family graveyard in his native village of Panail

== Bibliography ==
Some of his notable publications include:

=== Bengali ===
- Jībôn sômôsyār sômādhāne Islām (Islam as a solution to problems in life), articles on Islamic doctrines
- Hāsôn Rājā, 1854-1922, study of the life and works of the famous Bengali poet Hason Raja
- Sileṭe Islām (Islam in Sylhet), study on the advent and spread of Islam in Sylhet District, Bangladesh
- Ithihāse upekkhita ekṭi côritrô. Hashrata Ābuzôr Gifārīr jībônālekkhā o bôiplôbik kôrmadhārā (A neglected character in history), on the Islamic figure of Abu Dhar al-Ghifari
- Itihāser dhārā, on the history of philosophy
- Dhôrmô o dôrśôn (Religion and philosophy), essays on philosophy
- Sonā jhôrā dinguli, autobiography depicting the author's vast experience of life
- Kôbir dôrśôn, articles, mainly on Sir Muhammad Iqbal
- Bôktitter bikash, on self-improvement and psychology
- Tômôdduner bikash
- Sôtyer sôinik abuzor (Soldier of Truth Abu Dhar), on Abu Dhar al-Ghifari
- Nôtun Surjô (New Sun), storybook
- Islami andolôn juge juge (Islamic movements by era)
- Islam o manôbôtabad (Islam and humanism)
- Sôndhani dristite islam
- Amader jatiyôtabad (Our nationalism)
- Otit jibôner smriti (Memories of past life)
- Nôya zindegi (New life), novel
- Bigyan o dôrshôn (Science and philosophy)

=== English ===
- The back-ground of the culture of Muslim Bengal
- Science and revelation
- Philosophy of history
- Islamic movement : its origin, growth and development

== Awards ==
- Independence Day Award
- Ekushey Padak (1992)
- International Muslim Solidarity Prize
- Islamic Foundation Prize
- Srijnan Atish Dipankar Prize
