= Teghoria, Bangladesh =

Coordinates: 24.741911°N 91.585953°E

Teghoria তেঘরীয়া Teghoriya
- Village
- Interactive map of Teghoria
- Country: Bangladesh
- Division: Sylhet
- District: Sunamganj
- Upazila: Jagannathpur
- Union Parishad: Syedpur Shaharpara
- Ward: 5

Population
  - Total: 1,862

Teghoria (Bengali: তেঘরীয়া) is a village in the south-eastern part of Sunamganj District, Bangladesh. It is located in the fifth ward of Jagannathpur Upazila's Syedpur Shaharpara Union and nestles on the bank of the river Magura. It has a total population of 1,862 people; 973 being men and 899 being women.

== History ==
Teghoria was home to three prominent Sheikh Taluqdar families many centuries ago. The village was named as such; Te meaning three (prefix) and ghor meaning house - the village of the three homes.

== Education ==
Villagers send their children to the local Teghoriya Government Primary School which hosts 250 students. The Teghoriya Jame Masjid is also a notable large religious institution in the village.

== Notable people ==
- Dewan Mohammad Azraf, philosopher, writer, teacher and activist

== See also ==
- List of villages in Bangladesh
- Jagannathpur Upazila
- Syedpur Shaharpara Union
