= Budhrail =

Budhrail বুধরাইল
- Village
- Interactive map of Budhrail
- Coordinates: 24°44′35″N 91°35′40″E
- Country: Bangladesh
- Division: Sylhet Division
- District: Sunamganj District
- Upazila: Jagannathpur Upazila
- Union: Syedpur Shaharpara Union

Area
  - Total: 2.85 km^{2} (1.10 sq mi)

Population (2011)
  - Total: 2,281
- Time zone: UTC+6 (BST)

Budhrail (Bengali: বুধরাইল) is a village located in Syedpur Shaharpara Union of Jagannathpur Upazila, Sunamganj District, in the Sylhet Division of Bangladesh. It lies along the banks of the River Ratna and is part of the historically and culturally rich Sylhet region.

== Geography ==
Budhrail village is located at 24°44′34.703″N 91°35′41.662″E, covering a total area of 1.135 km^{2}. It is surrounded by Syedpur to the north, Islampur and Anuchand to the south, Sunathonpur and Shaharpara to the east, and Muradabad, Syedpur, and Thegoria to the west.

== History ==
Budhrail forms part of the Syedpur Shaharpara Union Council and shares deep cultural ties with neighbouring villages such as Shaharpara and Syedpur. Like much of the Sylhet region, the area developed as an agrarian settlement near river systems, with farming and trade shaping its local identity.

== Demographics ==
According to the 2011 Bangladesh census, Budhrail had a population of approximately 2,281 people. The majority of the inhabitants are Bengali Muslims, with a small number of other ethnic groups represented. The literacy rate and living standards have improved over the years, influenced by foreign remittances and access to education.

== Economy and livelihood ==
The economy of Budhrail is largely based on agriculture, small-scale businesses, and foreign remittances. Many villagers work in farming, fishing, and livestock rearing, which remain the traditional sources of income for most households. Seasonal crops and rice cultivation are the principal agricultural activities, supported by the fertile land along the River Ratna.

In recent decades, foreign remittances have become a vital part of the local economy, particularly from the United Kingdom. A significant number of residents from Budhrail have migrated abroad and settled in cities such as London, Birmingham, Oldham, Derby, and Luton, forming part of the wider British Bangladeshi and Sylheti diaspora. These expatriates regularly send money to their families, contributing substantially to household incomes, education, and community infrastructure projects.

This flow of remittances has transformed the socio-economic structure of Budhrail. Many families have built modern houses, improved access to education, and established small enterprises with funds sent from abroad. However, the village’s growing dependence on remittances also means that its economy can be affected by global economic fluctuations and immigration policies in destination countries.

== Education ==
Budhrail hosts several educational institutions:

- Budhrail Government Primary School – one of the oldest primary schools in the region, reportedly established in 1795.
- Budhrail Darul Ulum Madrasa – a local Islamic educational institution.
- A government health centre serves the community, providing primary medical care.

== Religion and culture ==
The majority of the population follows Islam. The village has several mosques, including:

- Budhrail Jame Masjid
- Uttar (North) Budhrail Jame Masjid

Cultural life in Budhrail reflects the traditions of rural Sylhet, with communal gatherings, religious festivals, and strong ties to expatriate family members abroad.

== Transport ==
Budhrail is accessible by road from Sylhet and Sunamganj, being about one hour’s drive from Sylhet city and roughly ninety minutes from Sunamganj town. Local roads connect the village to nearby unions and marketplaces. River routes are occasionally used for transport and fishing activities.

== Development and challenges ==
The village faces typical rural development challenges, including road infrastructure, healthcare access, and vulnerability to flooding due to its proximity to haor wetlands. Despite these challenges, remittance income and community initiatives have led to improvements in housing, sanitation, and education.

== Gallery ==
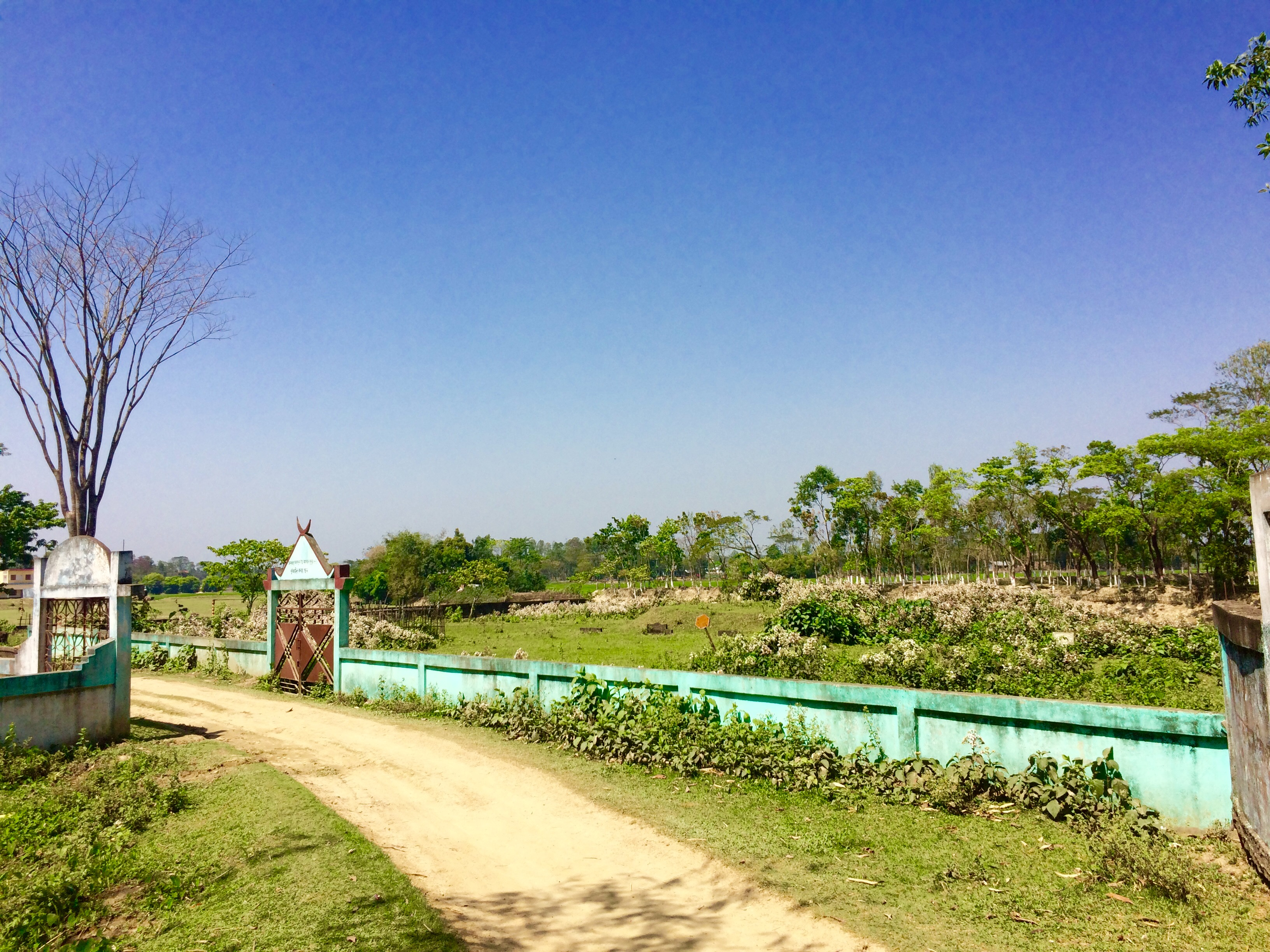
View of Budhrail Koborstan

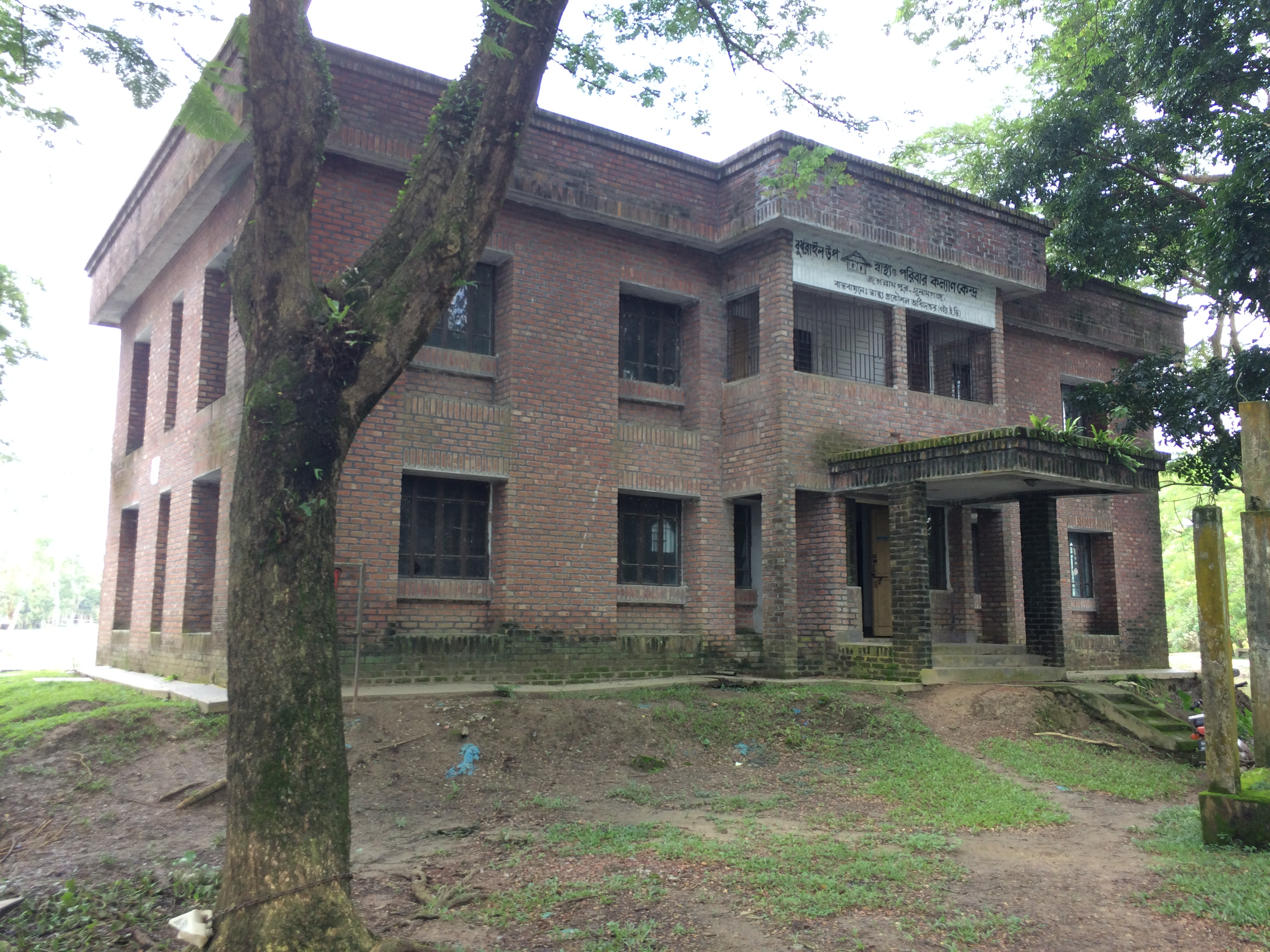
Budhrail Govt. health center

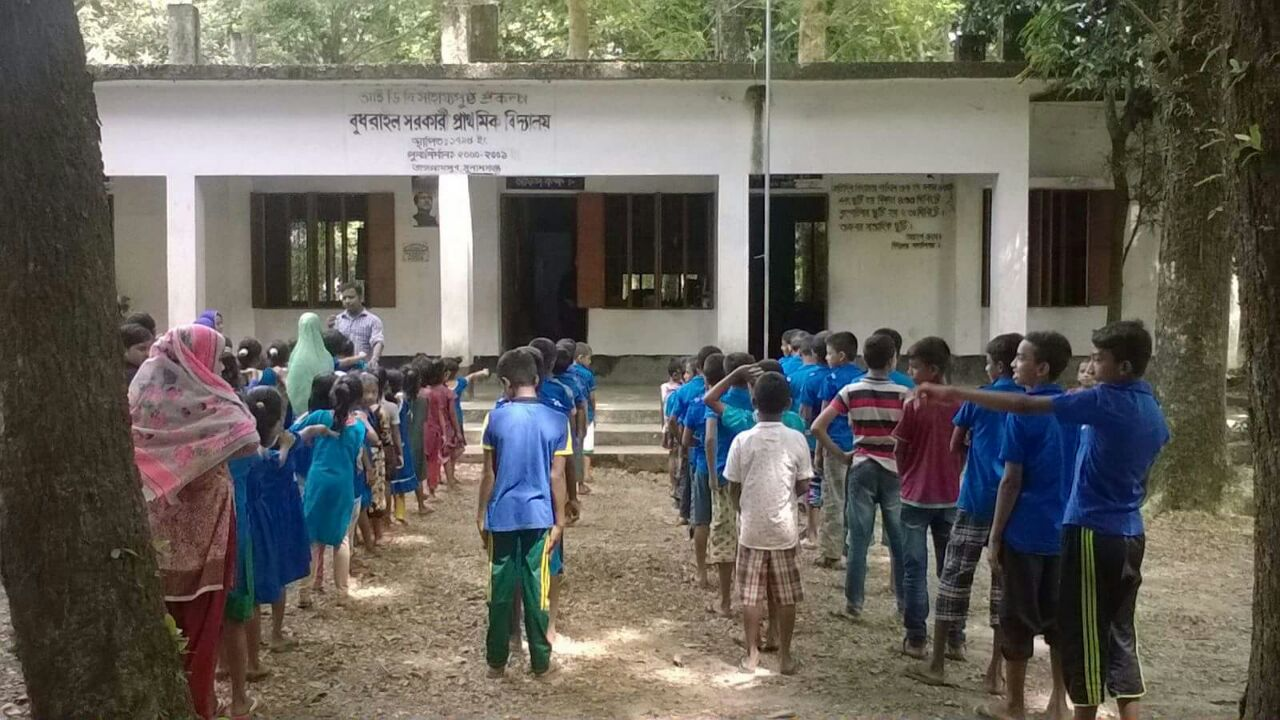
Physical training session of Budhrail primary School

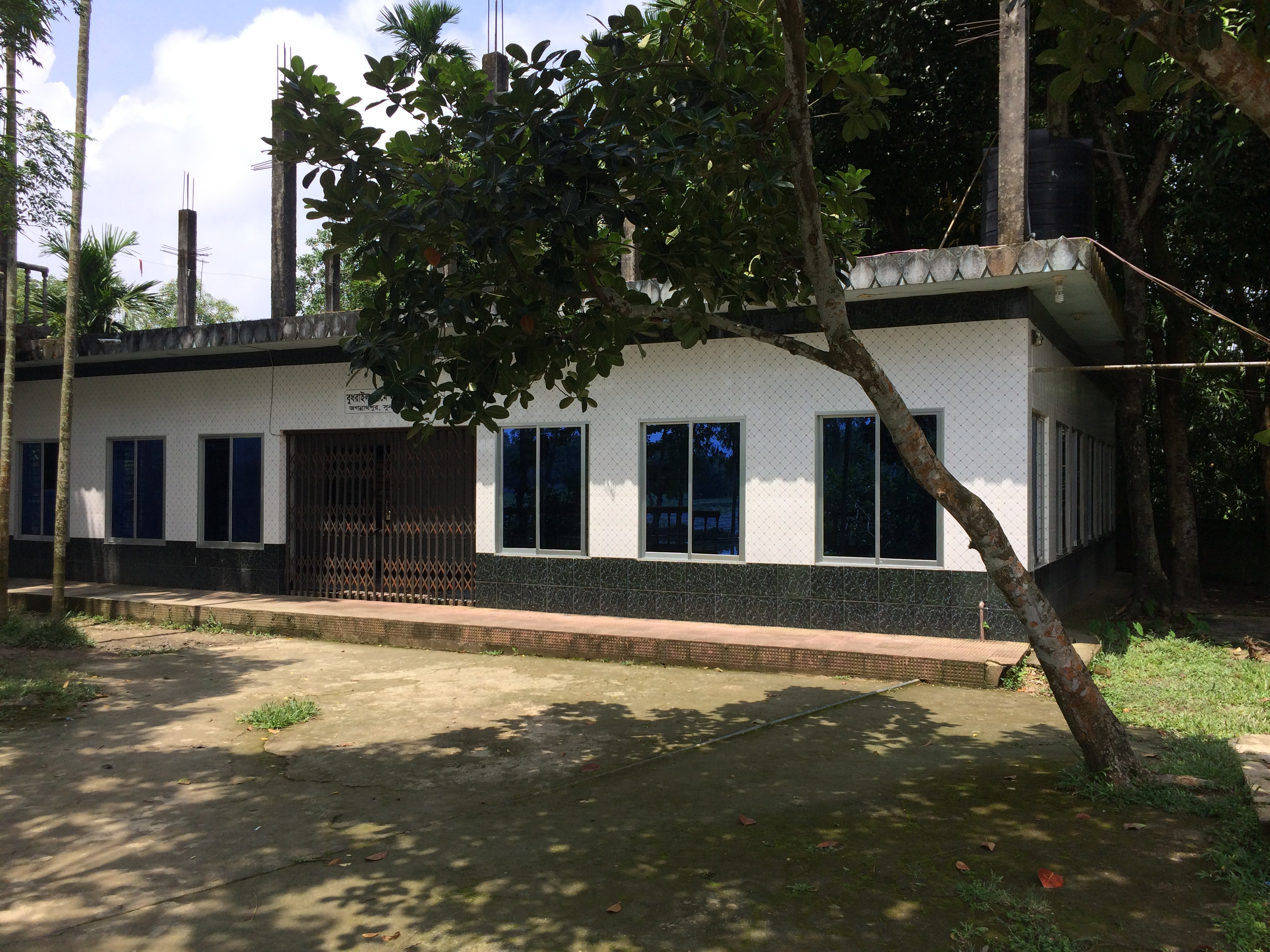
Budhrail Jame Mosjid

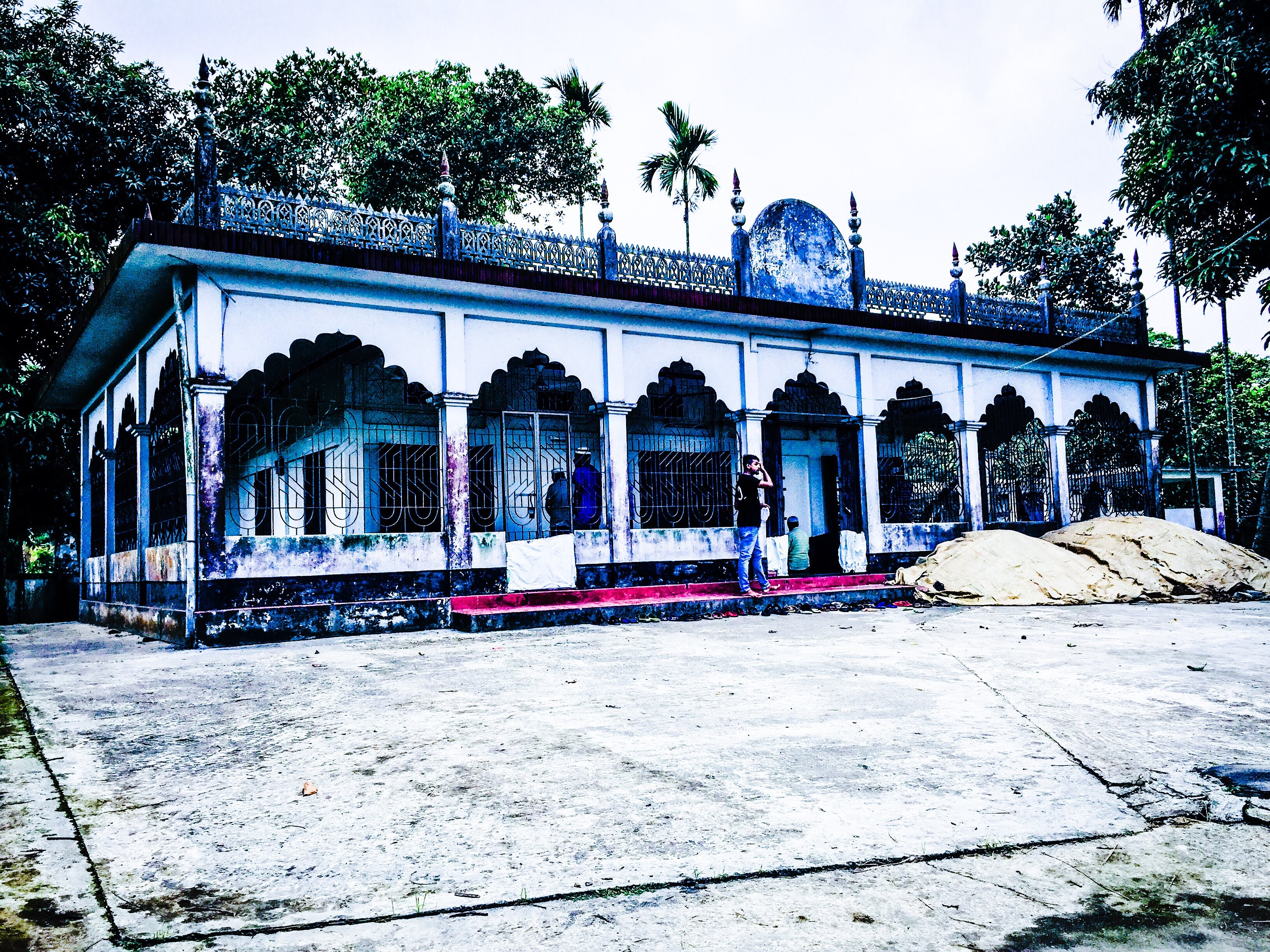
Uttar Budhrail Jame Mosjid on an evening

== See also ==
- List of villages in Bangladesh
- Syedpur Shaharpara Union
- Jagannathpur Upazila
- Sunamganj District
- Sylhet Division
- British Bangladeshis
- Sylheti people
