= Syedpur Shaharpara Union =

Syedpur Shaharpara Union সৈয়দপুর শাহারপাড়া ইউনিয়ন
- Union Council
- 7 No. Syedpur Shaharpara Union Council
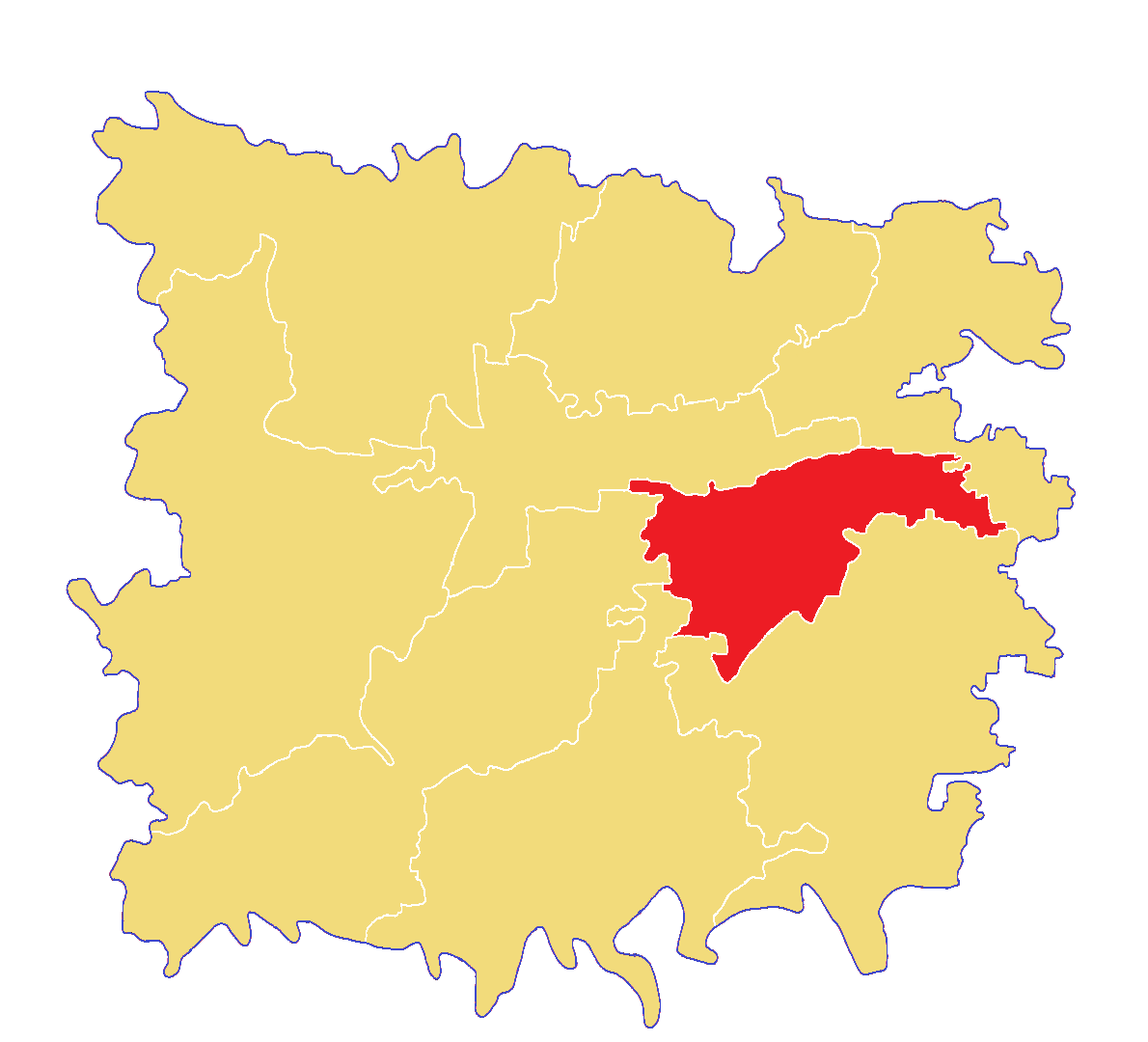

- Location in Bangladesh
- Coordinates: 24°45′10.572″N 91°35′47.009″E

Population (1996)
  - Total: 23,882
- Demonym(s): Syedpuri, Jagannathpuri, Sylheti
- Postal code: 3061
- Website: http://syedpurshaharparaup.sunamganj.gov.bd/

Syedpur Shaharpara Union Parishad (Bengali: সৈয়দপুর শাহারপাড়া) is a union council under Jagannathpur Upazila of Sunamganj District in the division of Sylhet, Bangladesh. It is located 6 kilometres south-east of Jagannathpur Upazila.

== Administration ==
Syedpur Shaharpara Union Parishad is one of the most populous union Parishad in the Sylhet Division. This union Parishad has 9 wards and 41 villages. See below the list of villages.

- Islampur
- Sunatonpur
- Teghoria
- Novagaon
- Shaharpara
- Tilok also spelt Tilak
- Pirergaon
- Budhrail
- Syedpur
- Boalgaon
- Ahmadabad
- Audot
- Muradabad
- Ulur chon
- Condi Hedayetpur
- Chituliya
- Chak Tilok also spelt Chawk Tilak aka Lalar Chawk
- Jalalabad
- Kamalshahi
- Fatehpur
- Karimpur
- Kurikiyar
- Mirpur
- Muftir Chak also spelt Muftir Chawk
- Mani Hara
- Nurainpur
- Rasoolpur also spelt Rasulpur
- Kurihal
- Tola Khal
- Harikuna
- Agunkona
- Ishankona
- Mallikpara
- Lambahati

== Representatives ==
The complete list of Chairman of Syedpur Shaharpara up.
SN	Name	Term of office
01	Maulana Syed Jamilul Haque	1961-1965
02	Rakesh Chandra Vottacharjo	1965-1966
03	Abdur Rouf Kamali	1967-1970
04	Abdul Jalil Tahshildhar	1971
05	Md. Abdul Khalik	1972-1977
06	Syed Abdul Hannan	1977-1984
07	Syed Ahadujjaman (Gous Miah)	1984-1987
08	Syed Afruj Hossain	1988-1993
09	Lutfur Rahman Kamali	1998-
10	Md. Abdul Ahad	1999-2002
11	Abdul Bari	2002
12	Alhaj Ataur Rahman	2003-2008
13	Syed Shila Miah	2008-2011
14	Mohammad Abul Hasan	2011-2016
15	Tayeb Miah Kamali	2016–2021
16	Mohammad Abul Hasan	2022-Present

== Political System ==
Syedpur-Shaharpara Union Parishad has nine council members from all nine wards. They are elected representative of their wards to the Union Council. Election is held every 5 years and members are elected by universal adult franchise. Current Chairman of Syedpur-Shaharpara Union Parishad is Taiyab Miah Kamali, who is popularly known as Taiyab Chairman.

== Education ==
Syedpur Shaharpara Union Parishad has

- 23 Primary school
- 20 Govt. Primary school
- 3 High school
- 1 College
- 4 Madrasa

== Notable people ==
- Syeda Shahar Banu (1914-1983), language activist

== See also ==
- Islampur
- Shaharpara
- Jagannathpur Upazila
- Shah Jalal High School
