= Islampur, Jagannathpur =

Islampur ইসলামপুর
- Village
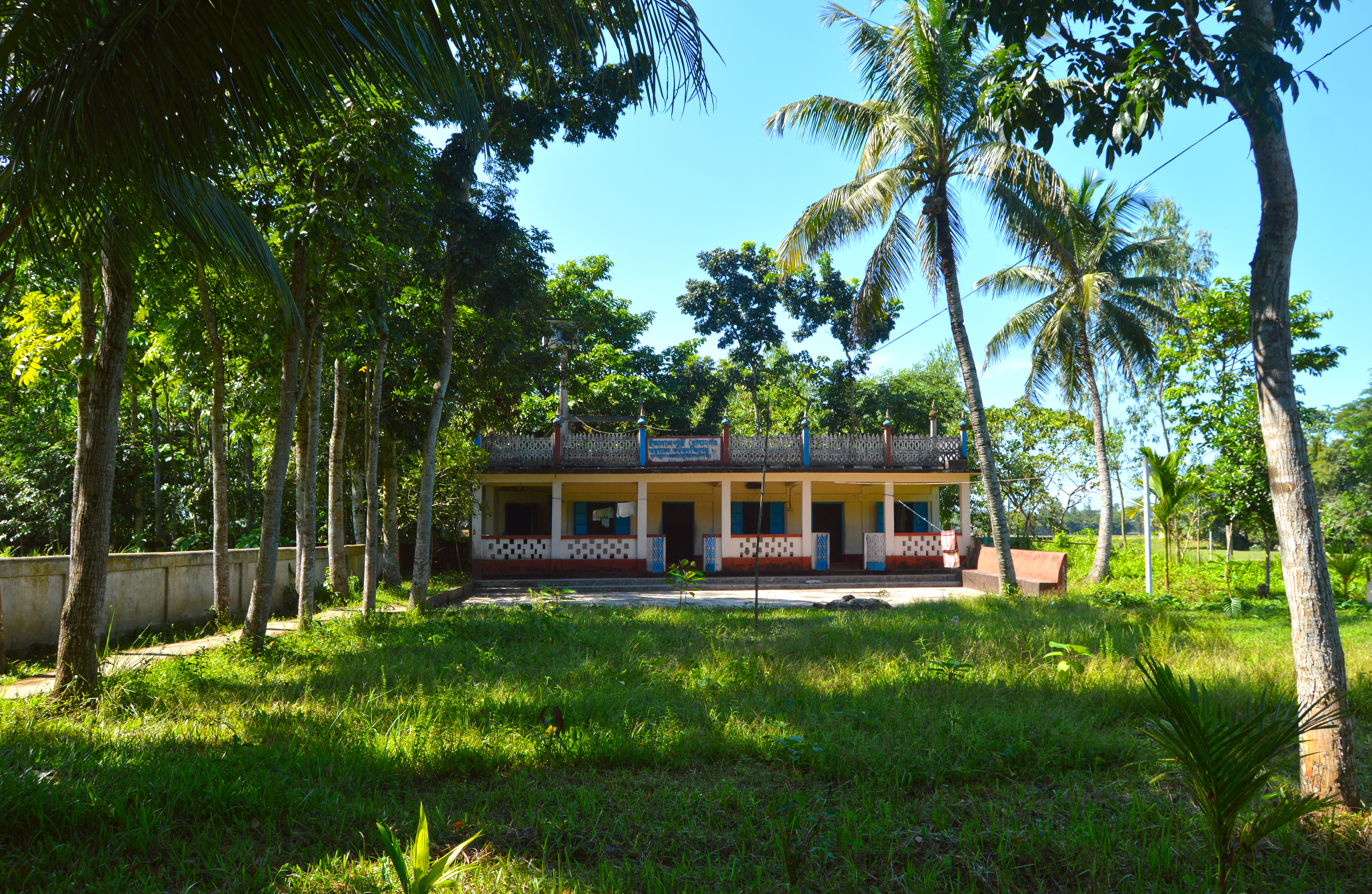
- Islampur Jame Masjid

- Location of Islampur in Bangladesh
- Coordinates: 24°44′7.529″N 91°35′37.148″E
- Country: Bangladesh
- Division: Sylhet
- District: Sunamganj
- Upazila: Jagannathpur
- Union Council: No. 07 Syedpur Shaharpara Union Parishad (Ward Number - 06)

Government
  - Ward Member: Shahin Ahmed

Area
  - Total: 1.135 km^{2} (0.438 sq mi)

Population (2011)
  - Total: 993
  - Density: 875/km^{2} (2,270/sq mi)
- Time zone: UTC+6 (BST)
- Postal code: 3061
- Website: islampur.org

Islampur (Bengali: ইসলামপুর), formerly known as Brahmangaon (Bengali: ব্রাহ্মণগাঁও, romanized: Brahmongaon), is a village in Syedpur Shaharpara Union of Jagannathpur Upazila in the district of Sunamganj, Sylhet, Bangladesh.

== History ==
=== Islampur Jame Masjid ===
In the 18th century, a Mosque was established on the west side of the village, which was named "Islampur Jame Masjid", with the consent of all to address the needs of the people. At that time there was no mosque in the village other than that of the neighbouring village Syedpur. Historical sources suggest that the village is named after the mosque. However, it is disputed.

== Demographics ==
According to the Population Census 2011 performed by Bangladesh Bureau of Statistics, the total population here is 993. There are 165 households in total.

== Geography ==
Islampur is located at 24°44′7.529″N 91°35′37.148″E. The total area of the village is 1.135 square kilometres (0.438 sq mi). Islampur village is bordering with Budhrail and Shaharpara on the north, Shewra and Alagdi on the south, Sunathonpur and Patkura on the east, Gosh Gaon and Teghoria on the west.

== Mouza ==
It has two Mouza: Brahmangaon and Sunatonpur.

== Etymology ==
"Islampur" is a combination of two words: Islam and pur. Islam is derived from the Arabic root "Salema", which literally means peace, purity, submission and obedience. And pur means village or city. So, "Islampur" means the village of peace.

== Education ==
=== Primary school ===
- Anuchandra Govt. Primary School
- Sunatonpur Govt. Primary School

=== Secondary school ===
- Shah Jalal High School
- Syedpur Pilot High School

=== College ===
- Syedpur Adarsha College

== Languages ==
The local people speak Bengali. Bangla and English languages are taught in schools. And, the educated section of the population can understand and speak English.

== Picture Gallery ==
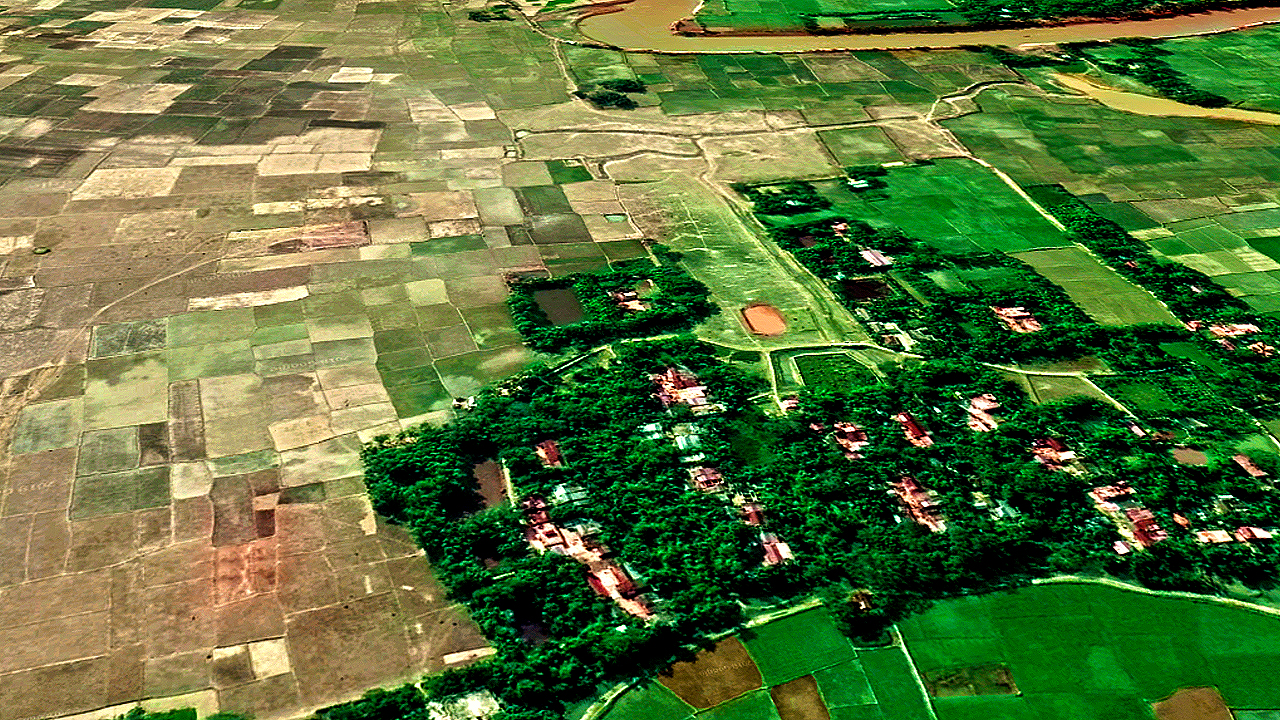
Bird's eye view

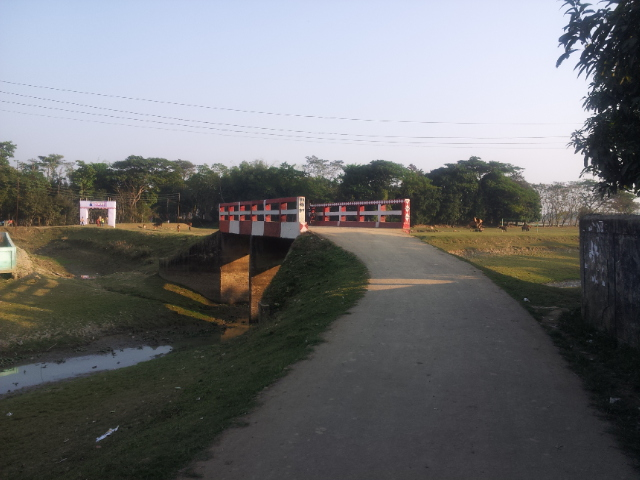
Bridge

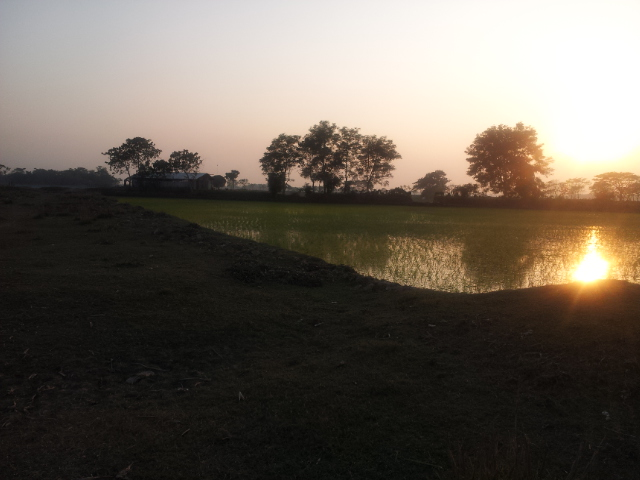
Sunset

== See also ==
- List of villages in Bangladesh
- Syedpur Shaharpara Union
