= Bangladesh Philosophical Association =

Research institute in Bangladesh

- Formation: 1972
- Headquarters: Dhaka, Bangladesh
- Region served: Bangladesh
- Official language: Bengali

Bangladesh Philosophical Association is an association of philosophers in Bangladesh. It carries out philosophical research and promotes the study of humanities. It is located in Dhaka.

== History ==
On 2 January 1972, following the Independence of Bangladesh in 1971, the members of the Pakistan Philosophical Congress who resided in Bangladesh meet in Dhaka under the leadership of Dewan Mohammad Azraf. He was the acting chairperson and treasurer of the first meeting Bangladesh Philosophical Association. The meeting also created the 15 member organising body of the association. Syed Abdul Hai was the first General Secretary of the Association.

The first general meeting of the association was held on 28 January 1973. The executive committee of the association was formed, Mohammad Saidur Rahman was the President and Abdul Jalil the general secretary. The association published Darshan, meaning philosophy in Bengali, a trimonthly magazine. The association held the first national convention of philosophy in Bangladesh in 1974. It was inaugurated by the President of Bangladesh Mohammad Mohammadullah.
